= University of Michigan Detroit Center =

Community outreach center

Coordinates: 42°20′52.2″N 83°03′31.1″W

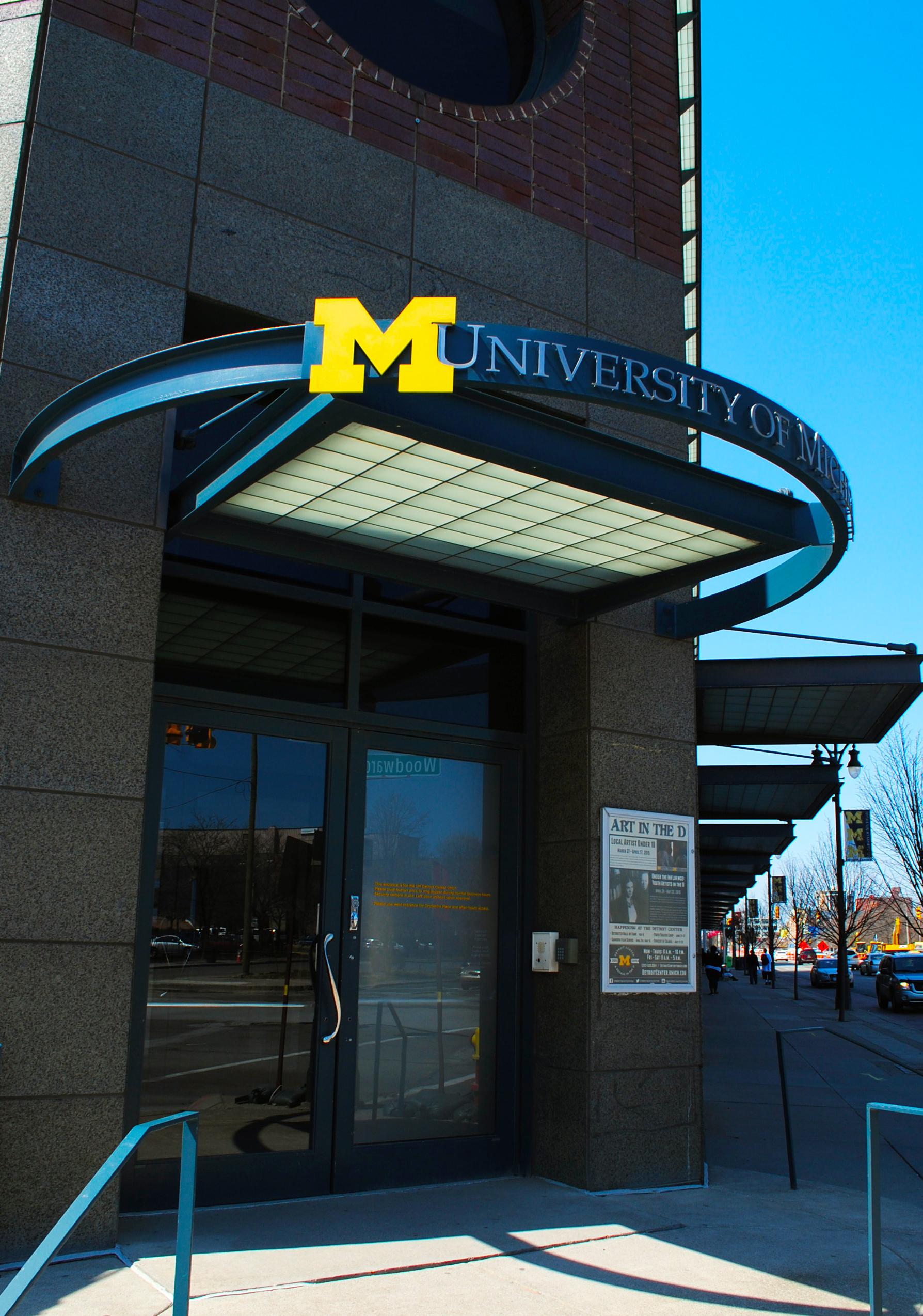
- Motto: Connecting the University and Detroit
- Type: Public
- Established: September 21, 2005 (20 years ago)
- Location: Detroit, MI, U.S.
- Website: detroit.umich.edu

The University of Michigan Detroit Center (UMDC, U-M Detroit Center or Detroit Center) is a community outreach center, meeting/events facility, and academic home base for University of Michigan units, located in Midtown Detroit.

The facility serves as a home base to more than 50 university staff and faculty members from the campuses of the University of Michigan and University of Michigan–Dearborn.

== History ==
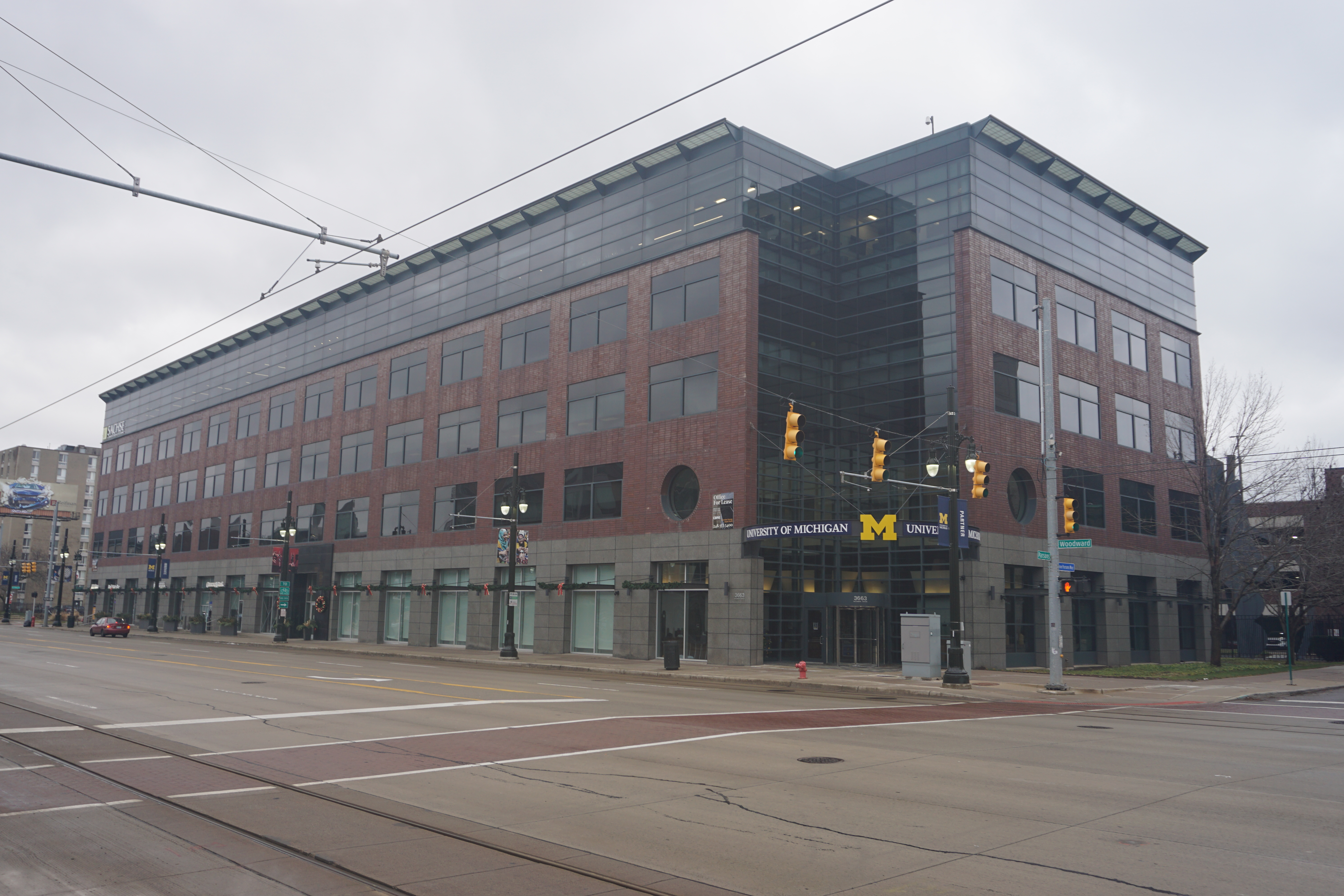
University of Michigan Detroit Center in December 2021

To meet the increasing needs of office space and a facility to host meetings and events in the City of Detroit, the University of Michigan opened the U-M Detroit Center on September 21, 2005. As a home base to University of Michigan faculty, staff and students, the 26,122-square-foot (2,426.8 m^{2}) facility occupies the ground floor of Orchestra Place on Woodward Avenue, located next to Detroit Symphony Orchestra. The renovated space was laid out and designed by University of Michigan alumnus Bill Grindatti under the guidance of former Taubman College Dean Douglas Kelbaugh. Taubman graduate Mashawnta Armstrong designed the street banners, while Art & Design students Nolan Loh and Mai Truong created the window signage.

In 2017, the Orchestra Place Building (3663 Woodward), which houses the Detroit Center, was sold to Broder & Sachse. A new lease agreement between Broder & Sachse and the University of Michigan included the Detroit Center moving to the opposite end of the building on the ground floor.

In 2021, it was announced that the Detroit Center would move to the Rackham building in Midtown Detroit following the completion of a $40 million renovation.

== University partners ==
The University of Michigan Detroit Center serves as a home-base to 17 academic units from the University of Michigan and University of Michigan-Dearborn campuses. Academic units located at the Detroit Center are active participants in Detroit-based research projects and/or facilitate events geared towards the Detroit and great Detroit communities.

- College of Engineering
- College of Literature, Science, and the Arts
- Department of Neurology
- Department of Psychology
- Detroit Admissions Office
- Environmental Health Sciences Center
- Ginsberg Center for Community Service and Learning
- Medical School
- Residential College
- School of Education
- School of Nursing
- School of Public Health
- School of Social Work
- School of Social Work Technical Assistance Center
- Taubman College of Architecture and Urban Planning
- University Libraries
- University of Michigan-Dearborn

== Community partners ==
The University of Michigan works with a wide variety of Detroit organizations to carry out its various projects, many of which utilize the services and resources of the Detroit Center. As a result, the Detroit Center helps facilitate a symbiotic relationship between the university and local partners to carry out research and community services.

- Brightmoor Community Center
- Capuchin Soup Kitchen
- Communities In Schools
- Community Development Advocates of Detroit
- Community Health and Social Services Center
- Detroit Area Schools
- Detroit Department of Health and Wellness Promotion
- Detroit Hispanic Development Corporation
- Detroit Neighborhood Partnership East
- Detroiters Working for Environmental Justice
- Friends of Parkside
- Henry Ford Health System
- Inc/Warren-Conner Development Coalition
- Latino Family Services
- Neighborhood Service Organization
- Rebuilding Communities
- Southwest Detroit Community Benefits Coalition
- Southwest Detroit Environmental Vision
- The Institute for Population Health
- The Kresge Foundation

== Programs & Initiatives ==
The U-M Detroit Center has developed programming initiatives, which take advantage of University and community resources. Ongoing programming initiatives include:

- Distinctly Detroit Podcast - a podcast exploring the crossover of U of M community members living and working in Detroit.
- U-M Detroiter Hall of Fame – With the inaugural Hall of Fame class inducted in 2013, this exhibit celebrates Detroit natives who have graduated from the University of Michigan and made recognized national or global contributions to their disciplines. The 2013 class featured a discussion with inductees and actor David Alan Grier and journalist Robin Givhan.
- Concert of Colors Outdoor Stage – Each summer since 2011, the Detroit Center has partnered with the Michigan State University Detroit Center to run two days of world music programming (approximately 18 acts) for the “Concert of Colors” festival - the largest free music festival in Detroit.
- Annual Martin Luther King, Jr. Symposium – Each year the Detroit Center simulcasts the keynote address and provides a panel featuring local community panelists discussing a topic complementing the symposium theme.
- Semester in Detroit Speaker Series - The Detroit Center is the co-sponsor of Semester in Detroit lectures and workshops engaging students and community members on contemporary topics including Detroit politics, culture and the economy.
- Noel Night – A community partnership with the MSU Detroit Center, Whole Foods-Detroit, Great Lakes Coffee, and Detroit School of Arts, the Detroit Center hosts a presentation of holiday music and activities for Midtown Detroit’s seasonal celebration, Noel Night.

PAST PROGRAM OFFERINGS

- Chinese Cultural Arts Programs - With the Confucius Institutes of U-M and Wayne State University, the Detroit Center has hosted and facilitated performances in Detroit featuring the Liaoning University Musical Troupe (2012) and China Conservatory of Music (2013).
- Youth Theatre Fellows Program – The Detroit Center conducts a summer theatre camp for high school students. For the 2014 camp, the Detroit Center has secured a commitment to partner with WSU’s Department of Theatre and Dance to assist with the facilitation of design workshops.
- Sounds of the Season – From 2011-2016, the Detroit Center offered a seasonal music program and luncheon for community seniors.
- Sankofa Film Series – Co-sponsored with U-M Dearborn, the Detroit Center provided a film series with facilitated discussions regarding African American cultural arts from 2011-2017.
- Local Music Workshops – In May and August from 2012-2015, the Detroit Center sponsored music workshops with noted musicians and musicologists to complement Detroit’s Electronic Music (Movement) and Jazz Festivals.
- 50th Anniversary of Freedom Walk – The Detroit Center organized a group of 65 students, alumni, and community members to join marchers commemorating the 50th Anniversary of the historic Detroit Freedom Walk.
- Work Detroit Gallery Exhibits - With the Penny W. Stamps School of Art & Design, the Detroit Center annually sponsors a major gallery exhibition at the Center’s Work Detroit Gallery. Past programs have included a show featuring Jon Lockard paintings, a tribute to the Martin Luther King Jr. Memorial, and an exhibition of the work of local Detroit artists. This latter show addressed social concerns within Detroit's African American community by exploring topics of identity, territory, protest, sexuality and transition.
- School Partnerships: Detroit School of Arts – Student performers provided entertainment for various events throughout the academic year, such as Noel Night and Sounds of the Season. The Detroit Center sponsored 90 students and chaperones to attend the “Race” exhibit at the University’s Museum of Natural History. The Detroit Center also hosted students at the Detroit Center for 1) a student Town Hall meeting with Senator Carl Levin, and 2) artist-led workshops related to Detroit 21 – a Work Detroit gallery exhibition. Burton Elementary School – Since 2011, a staff member served as a Reading Corps volunteer for 2 students each year at Burton Elementary School (1 hour per week for the academic year). Plymouth Educational Center – Over a 13-month period, the Detroit Center organized volunteers to relabel, shelve and catalog books for a K-8 charter school’s formerly dormant library. Various Schools – Detroit Center staff have provided lectures/workshops and coaching of students on an ad hoc basis for K-12 schools in Metro Detroit area.
- Thanksgiving Day Parade Watch Party – In partnership with the U-M Alumni Association.

COMMUNITY SERVICE PROJECTS

- United Way
- St. Patrick Food Pantry – Food Drive
- ACCESS Adult Literacy Program – Book Drive
- Midtown Detroit Clean-Up Day Coalition for Temporary Shelter – Fund Drive
- St. Leo’s Parish & Soup Kitchen – Coat Drive

REGIONAL MEMBERSHIPS

- The Detroit Center is an active member of Midtown Detroit Inc., Culture Source (a regional culture and arts support organization), Metro Detroit Visitors and Convention Bureau, and the WTVS-TV Community Advisory Panel.

== Detroit Connector ==
The Detroit Connector provides transportation between Ann Arbor, Dearborn and Detroit in support of curricular, co-curricular, research, service-learning and community service opportunities. The service is available to U-M faculty, staff and students, as well as the general public. With initial funding from the Provost Office’s Transforming Learning for the Third Century grant, the Detroit Connector began service in September 2013 as a free, pilot shuttle that was co-managed by the U-M Detroit Center and LSA Semester in Detroit program. Following a successful trial period, the Provost Office affirmed its support of the system.

Upon the public announcement of the MDetroit Center Connector in September 2013, this service made local and regional headlines in digital/print and broadcast news.

In December 2013, a University of Michigan student-made video highlighting the MDCC was featured on Deadline Detroit.

In September 2015, the service was rebranded the "Detroit Connector" in an attempt to connect more broadly between the University of Michigan and the City of Detroit.

On October 23, 2017, the University of Michigan's Detroit Connector service announced that it was expanding service to seven days a week, which also included availability to the general public. The service will cost $400,000 and is part of the University commitment to making U-M more accessible for all in the metro Detroit region.

For fiscal year 2017, the Detroit Connector is managed by the Office of Diversity, Equity & Inclusion and operated by Michigan flyer.

The Detroit Connector was discontinued in 2020 following the announcement that it would be replaced by a new service called D2A2. The D2A2 bus service is sponsored by the Ann Arbor Area Transportation Authority (AAATA), which is independent of the University.
