= Midtown Detroit =

- Cultural center and neighborhood
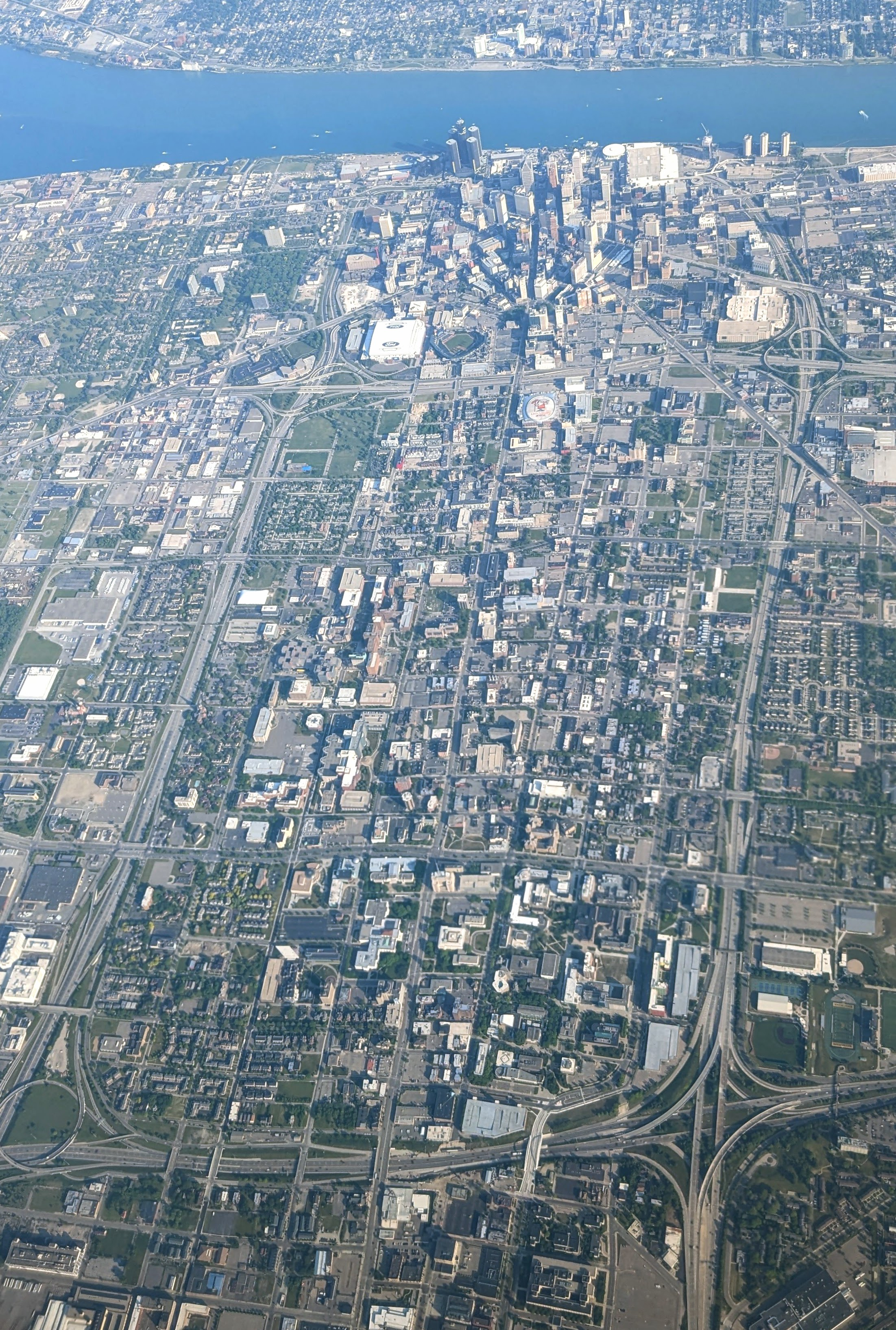
- Midtown Detroit, encircled by freeways
- Interactive map of Midtown Detroit
- Coordinates: 42°21′2″N 83°3′34″W
- Country: United States
- State: Michigan
- County: Wayne
- City: Detroit

Area
  - Total: 2.09 sq mi (5.4 km^{2})
  - Land: 2.09 sq mi (5.4 km^{2})
  - Water: 0.00 sq mi (0 km^{2})

Population (2010)
  - Total: 14,550
  - Density: 6,961.28/sq mi (2,687.77/km^{2})
- Time zone: UTC-5 (Eastern Standard Time (North America))
  - Summer (DST): UTC-4 (Eastern Daylight Time (North America))

Midtown Detroit is a commercial and residential district located along the east and west side of Woodward Avenue, north of Downtown Detroit, and south of the New Center area. The area includes several historic districts. In addition, it is a residential area for 14,550 people and covers 2.09 mi^{2} (5.4 km^{2}). The community area of neighborhoods is bounded by the Chrysler Freeway (I-75) on the east, the Lodge Freeway (M-10) on the west, the Edsel Ford Freeway (I-94) on the north, and the Fisher Freeway (I-75) on the south.

== Overview ==
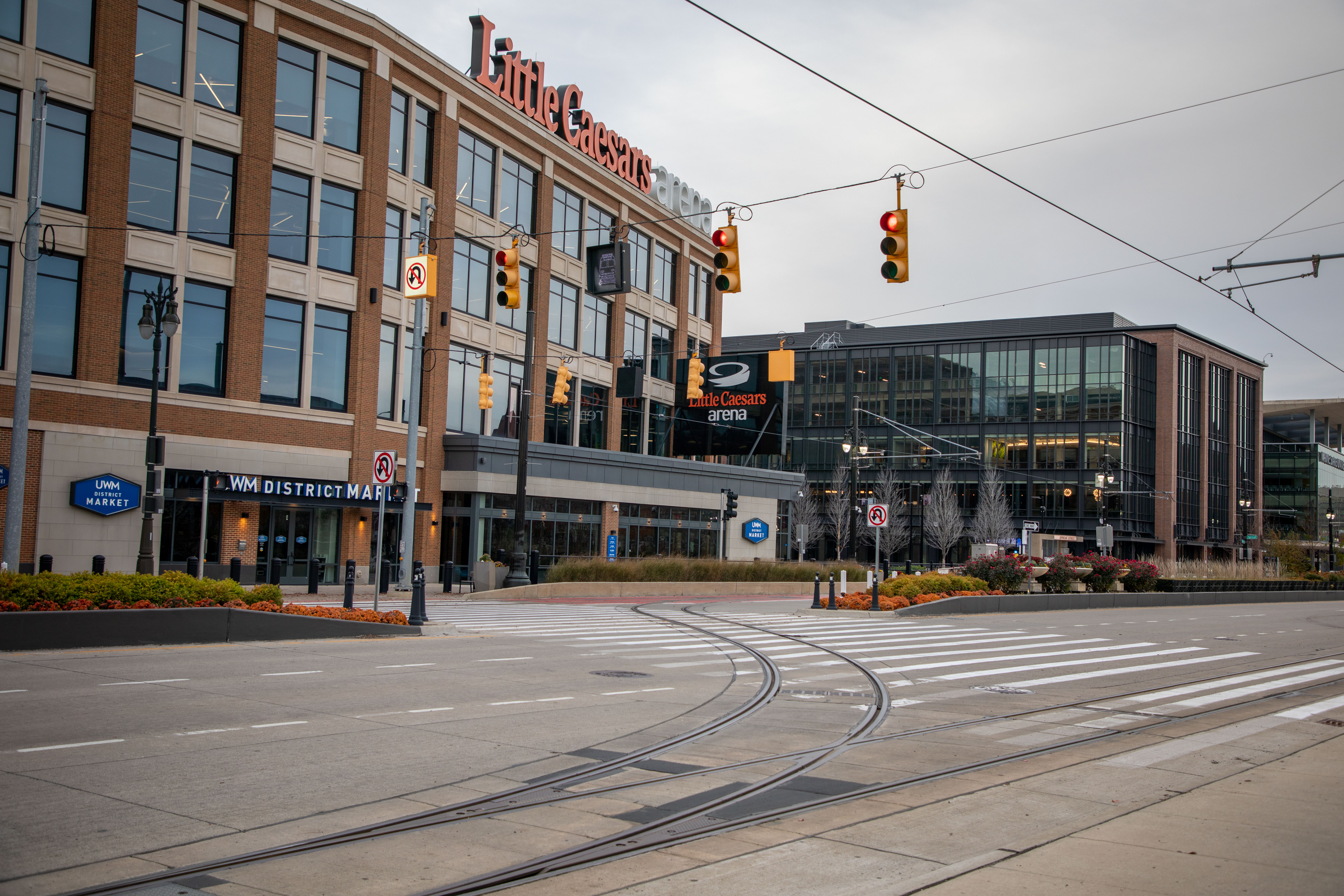
Little Caesars Arena

The Midtown area is a general mixed-use community area of neighborhoods containing successive waves of development that have transformed the area multiple times since it was first platted. The neighborhoods are dominated by the thoroughfare of Woodward Avenue, which runs north and south through the heart of Midtown. This neighborhood was previously known as Cass Corridor and many Detroiters continue to refer to it as such.

Woodward Avenue, running north and south through the center of the neighborhood, is primarily inhabited by commercial businesses, public-oriented/cultural institutions, and religious buildings. The heart of the cultural center (the Detroit Public Library Main Branch and the Detroit Institute of Arts) is located directly on Woodward in the northern part of Midtown.

The north part of Midtown west of Woodward Avenue is dominated by Wayne State University, whose campus subsumes nearly the entire northwest portion of Midtown north of Warren Avenue and west of Woodward. Wayne State University's campus covers 203 acres (0.82 km^{2}) in the northwestern section of Midtown. Wayne's campus is irregular, and parts extend south of Warren (notably Old Main) and north of I-94, out of Midtown and into the New Center neighborhood. Additionally, Wayne's athletic facilities are west of the Lodge Freeway. Wayne is one of Michigan's three research institutions and serves over 32,000 students.

The first portion of what later became Wayne State University was the Detroit Medical College, which was founded in 1868. The school of education was begun in 1881. In 1896, Old Main was built as Detroit's Central High School. College classes were added in 1913, and these Liberal Arts classes evolved into Detroit Junior College in 1917. The school began offering four-year degrees in 1923 and graduate courses were added in 1930. Three years later, the previously disparate colleges were united under one administration into Wayne University. In 1956, the school was renamed Wayne State University.

Since the early 1940s, Wayne State University, backed by the City Planning Commission, has shaped the development of the surrounding area through its plan for growth. The availability of urban redevelopment grants beginning in the 1950s became an important funding resource for expansion of the university. The size of the campus has continued to expand, with the University constructing new buildings as well as repurposing older buildings located in the area. As of fall 2015, nearly 30,000 students were enrolled at Wayne State: over 18,000 undergraduate students and over 8,000 graduate students, with the remainder enrolled in professional programs.

The Art Center (or Cultural Center) is centered on the Cultural Center Historic District: the Detroit Public Library Main Branch, the Detroit Institute of Arts, and the Horace H. Rackham Education Memorial Building. The district contains several cultural attractions.

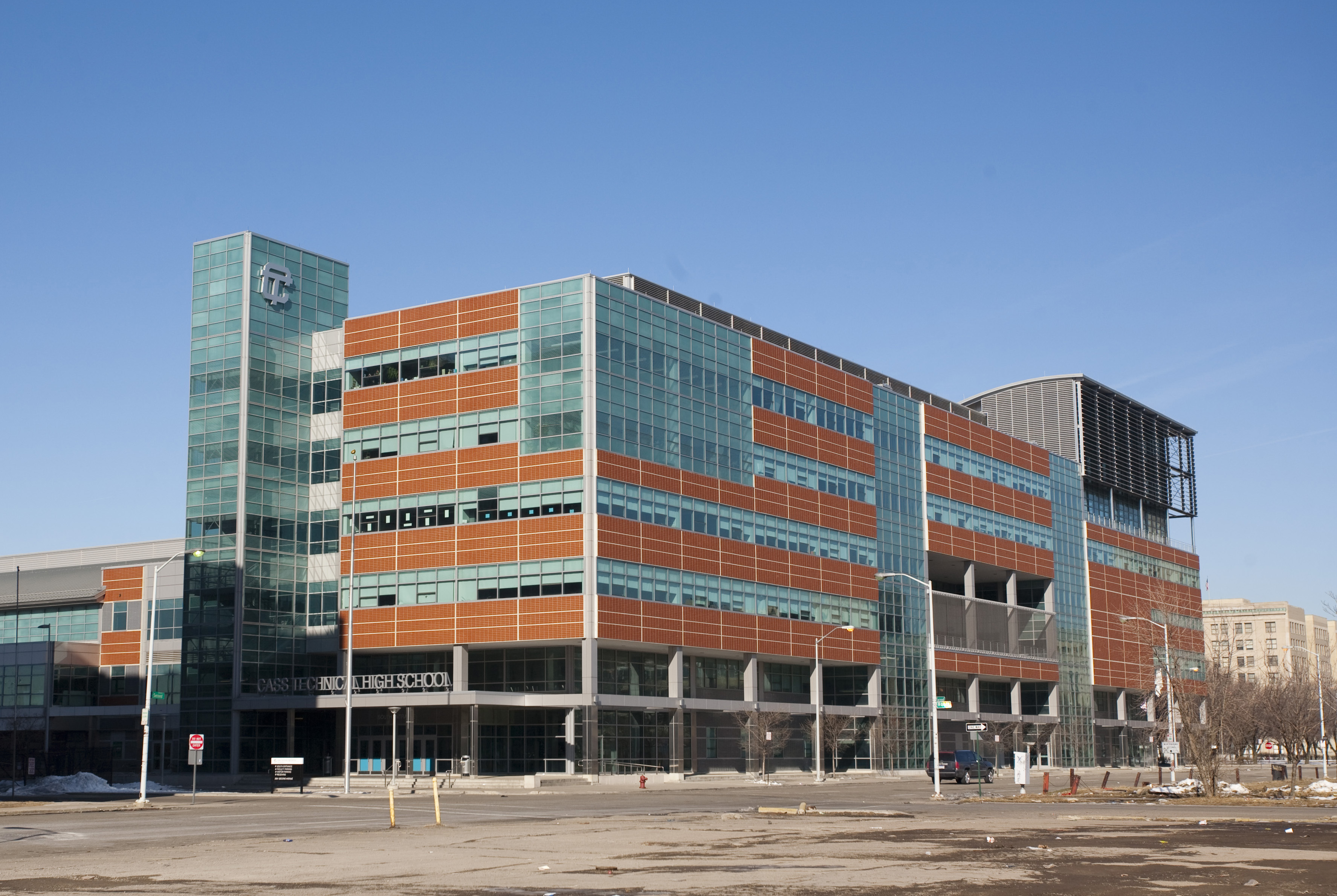
Cass Technical High School

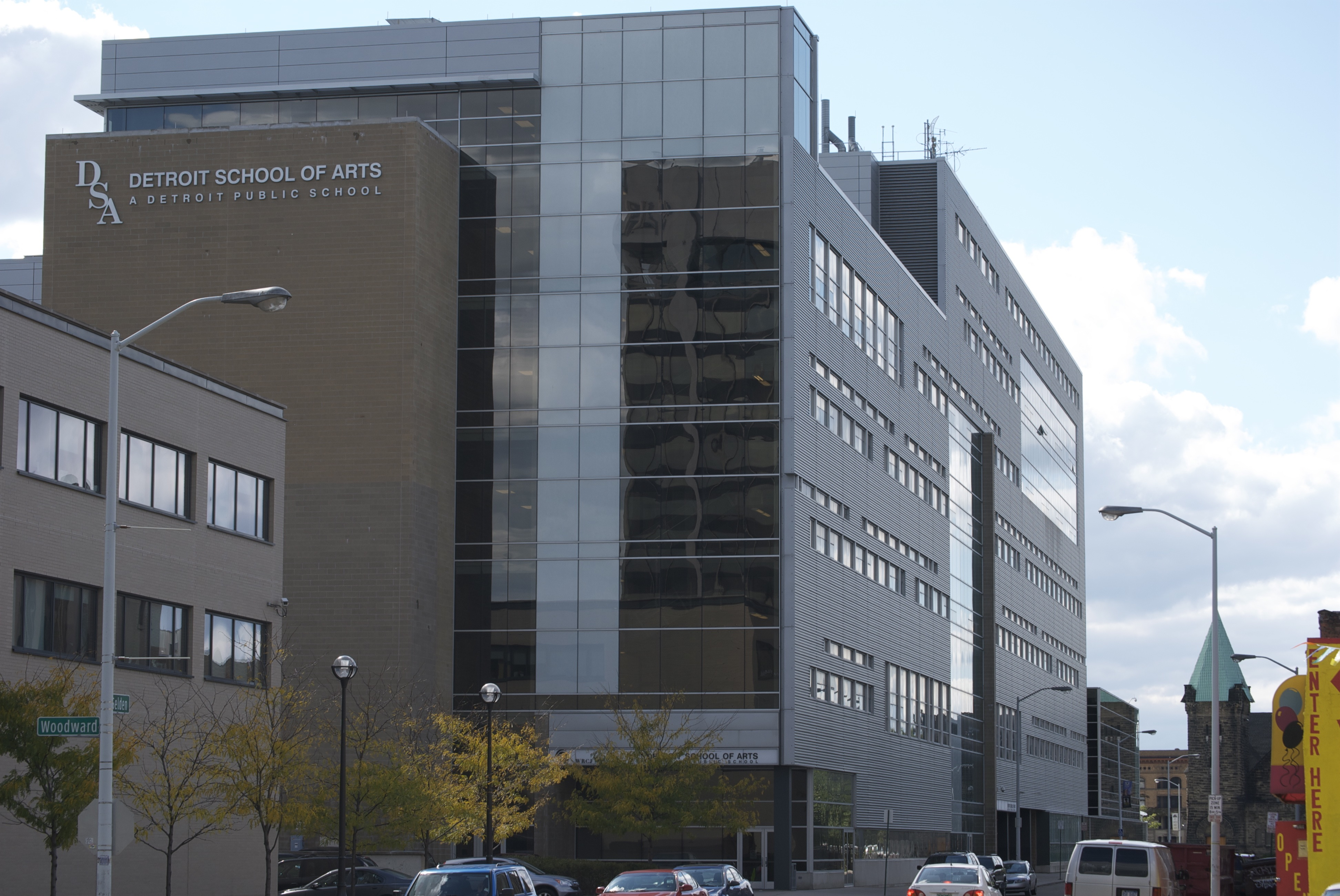
Detroit School Of Arts High School

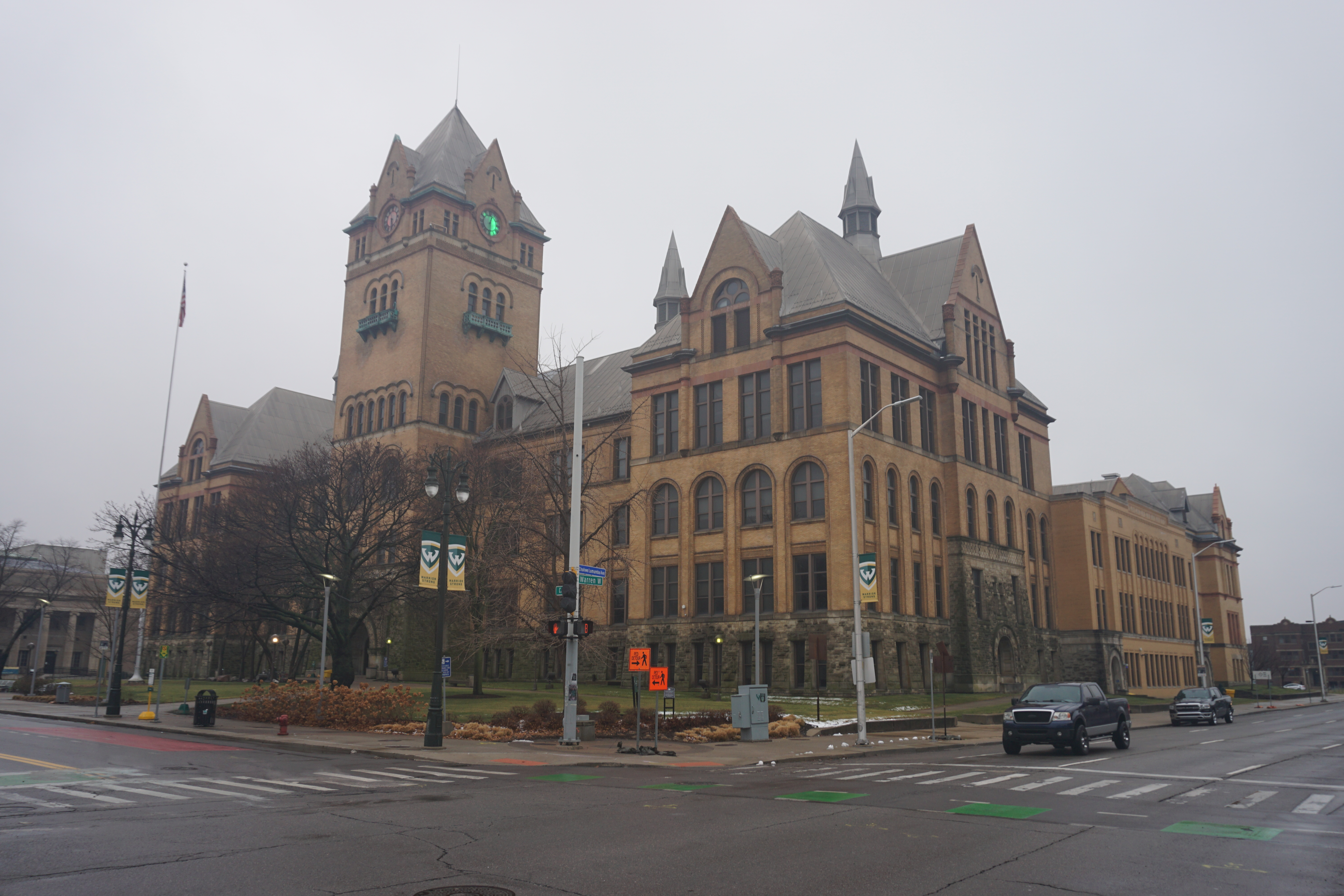
Wayne State University Old Main

The library and art museum were built in the 1920s, heralding a City Beautiful movement in Detroit that aimed to establish the area along Woodward as the cultural center of the city. Wayne State University, then housed in the former Central High School, began offering four-year degrees. These institutions formed a core area that attracted other public-oriented institutions to the area, including several music schools, the Merrill-Palmer Institute, the Detroit Historical Museum, and the College for Creative Studies. The Charles H. Wright Museum of African American History, the Detroit Science Center, and the Museum of Contemporary Art Detroit also are located in the Art Center area.

The Art Center portion of Midtown also contains substantial residential areas, including the East Ferry Avenue Historic District and scattered late-19th century homes to the east of the Detroit Institute of Art. These neighborhoods have been infilled with townhomes and other residential developments and revitalizations.

South of Wayne State University, the North Cass (or Cass Farm) area contains a substantial number of multi-unit apartment houses, many mixed with earlier single-family homes. This area has been heavily influenced by the expansion of Wayne State, with some of WSU's campus extending into the northern section of North Cass, and much of the residential housing stock taken up by Wayne students.

There are also a number of commercial buildings, particularly along the Cass Corridor just west of Woodward. Many of these support commercial businesses, and an independent retail study by the University Cultural Center Association has shown that the number of independent retail outlets in Midtown Detroit is increasing. The north Cass section also has a smattering of industrial buildings dating from the automotive heyday of Detroit. Many of these, such as the Willys Overland building, have been or are being converted into residential loft space.

The Detroit Medical Center was organized in 1985 as a union among several hospitals: Harper University Hospital, Grace Hospital, Hutzel Women's Hospital, and Children's Hospital of Michigan. With the addition of other hospitals, such as Detroit Receiving Hospital, the campus of the DMC and its adjacent partner institutions (the Karmanos Cancer Institute and the John D. Dingell Veteran's Administration Hospital Center) now takes up most of the area between Mack Avenue on the south, Warren Avenue on the north, John R. on the west, and Beaubien on the east.

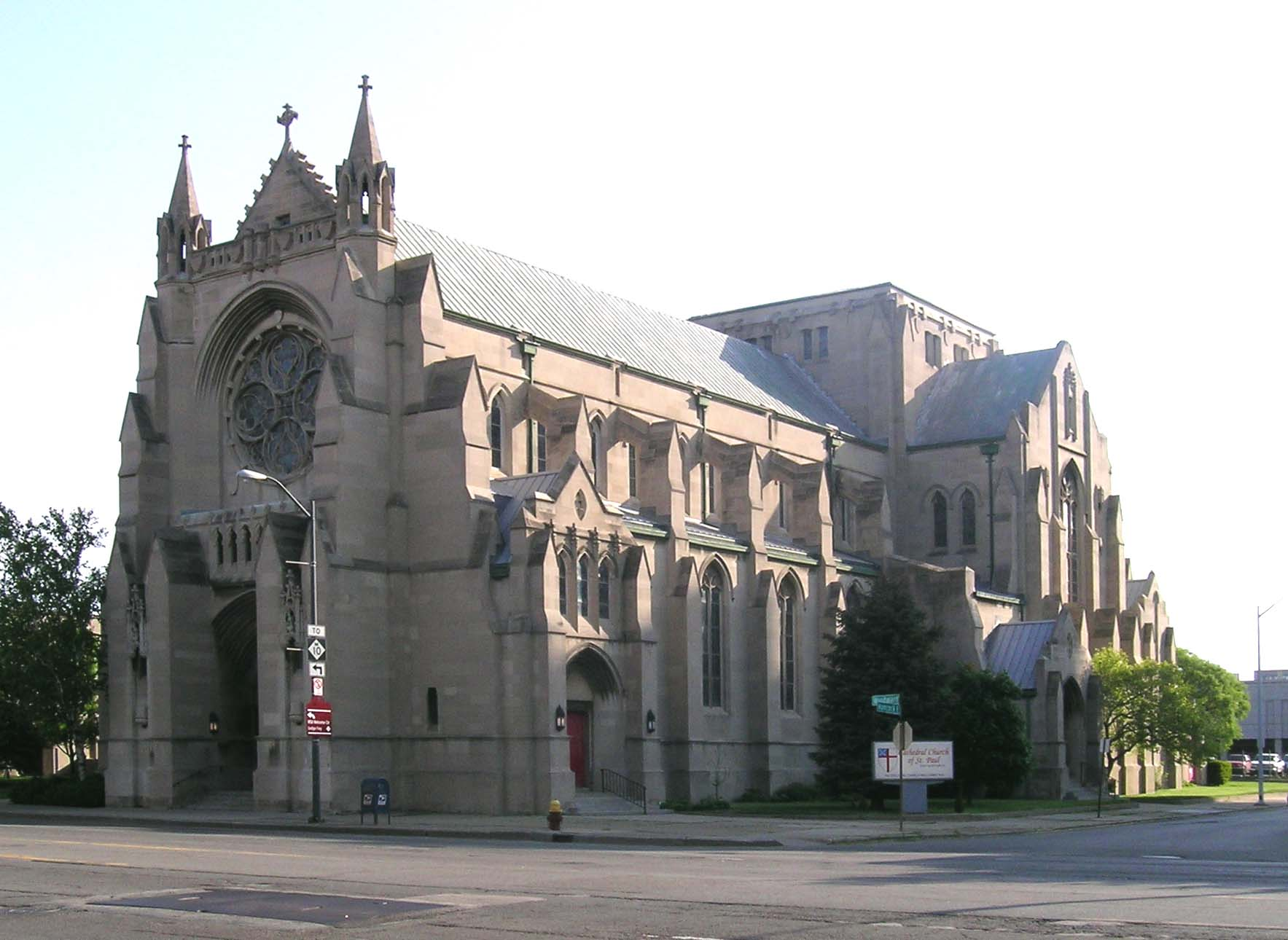
Cathedral Church of St. Paul on Woodward Avenue

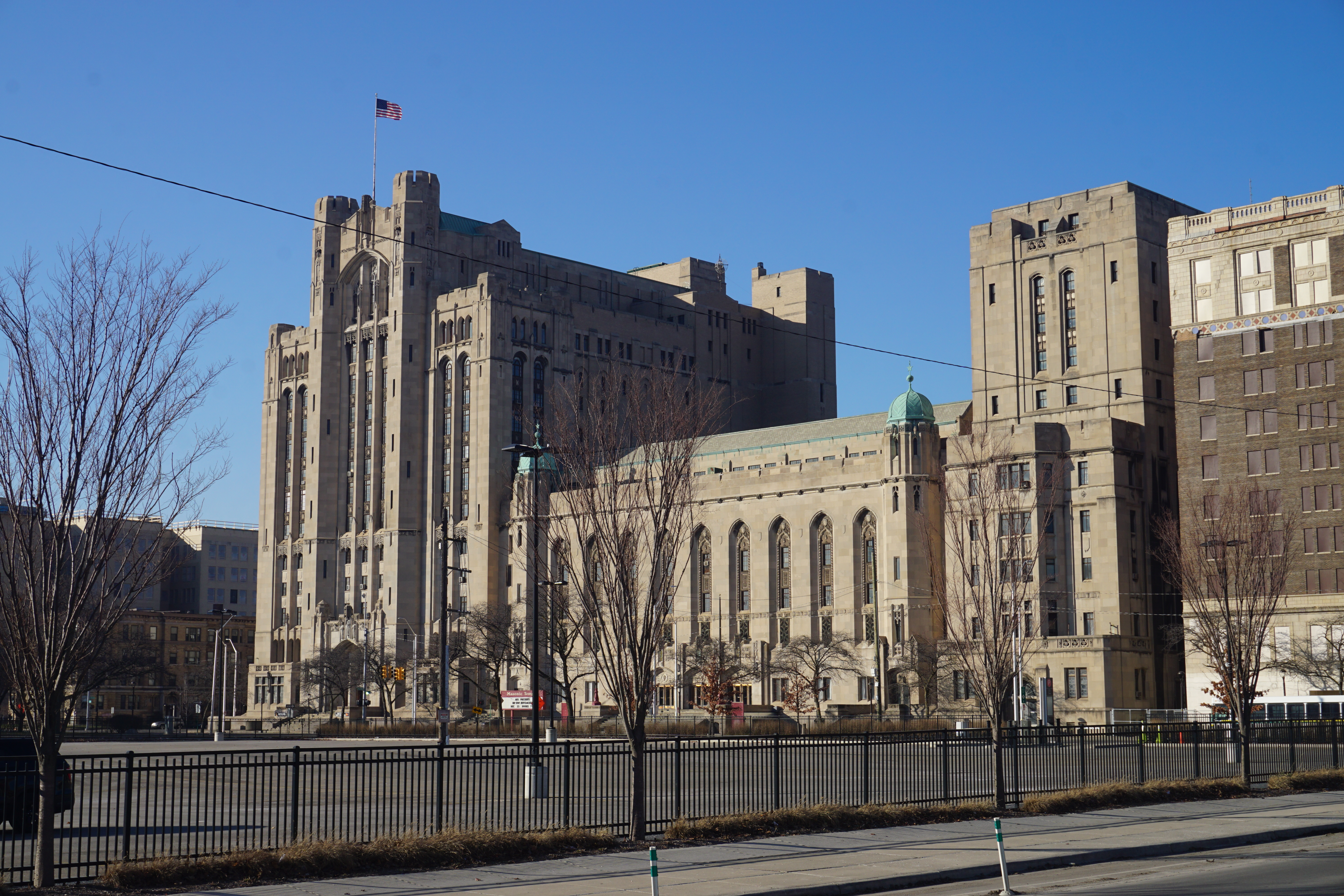
Detroit Masonic Temple

Harper Hospital was founded in 1863, receiving its first patients, Civil War soldiers, in 1864. Two years later it opened as a general hospital. In 1882 a new hospital building was constructed on what is now the campus of the DMC. Additional buildings were constructed in 1913 and 1928. Hutzel Women's Hospital, founded in 1868, was Detroit's second hospital. Grace Hospital was founded in 1883, and Children's Hospital was founded three years later. Detroit Receiving was founded in 1915, and moved to its present location in 1980.

In 2012, two major construction projects were begun in New Center, the Henry Ford Health System started the first phase of a $500 million, 300-acre revitalization project, with the construction of a new $30 million, 275,000-square-foot, Medical Distribution Center for Cardinal Health, Inc. and Wayne State University started construction on a new $93 million, 207,000-square-foot, Integrative Biosciences Center (IBio). As many as 500 researchers and staff will work out of the IBio Center.

South of Martin Luther King Jr Boulevard, the area of Midtown around Cass Park is at a substantial distance from both the downtown core and the influence of Wayne State. The area around Cass Park proper is anchored by Cass Technical High School and the Detroit Masonic Temple, but the portion near Woodward Avenue and the once-fashionable Park Avenue district are awaiting redevelopment.

The Brush Park district proper runs from Mack Avenue to the Fisher freeway, and extends east and west from Woodward Avenue to Beaubien Street.

Brush Park was developed beginning in the 1850s as a residential neighborhood for Detroit's elite citizens. Construction peaked in the 1870s and 1880s; one of the last homes built was constructed in 1906 by architect Albert Kahn for his personal use. Early residents of Brush Park included lumber baron David Whitney Jr., his daughter Grace Whitney Evans, Joseph L. Hudson, founder of the eponymous department store, lumber baron Lucien Moore, banker Frederick Butler, and dry goods manufacturer Ransom Gillis. During the 19th century, around 300 homes were built in Brush Park, including 70 Victorian mansions. The neighborhood is currently experiencing restoration of its historic homes; at present, about 80 original structures remain in the area. Brush Park's revival began in the 1990s and has accelerated recently. A number of the older mansions have been restored, and more have been stabilized. In addition, new condominiums have been built in the southern part of Brush Park, near the Fisher Freeway.

In the far southeastern corner of Midtown, to the east of Beaubien and Brush Park proper, the now-demolished Brewster-Douglass Housing Projects were located near the Chrysler Freeway. Midtown contains within its boundaries a number of historic districts and neighborhoods.

=== Districts ===
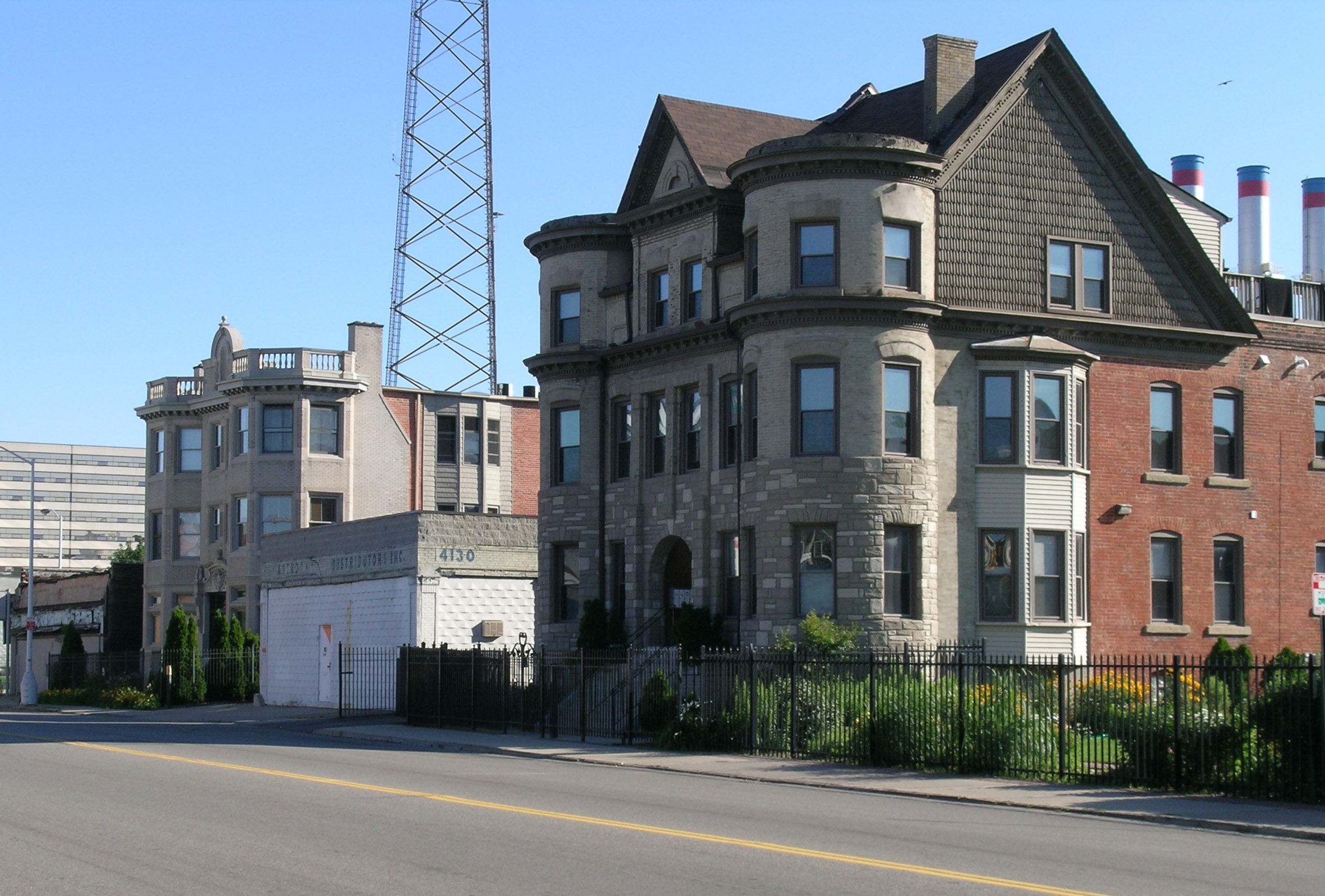
Cass Avenue north of Alexandrine

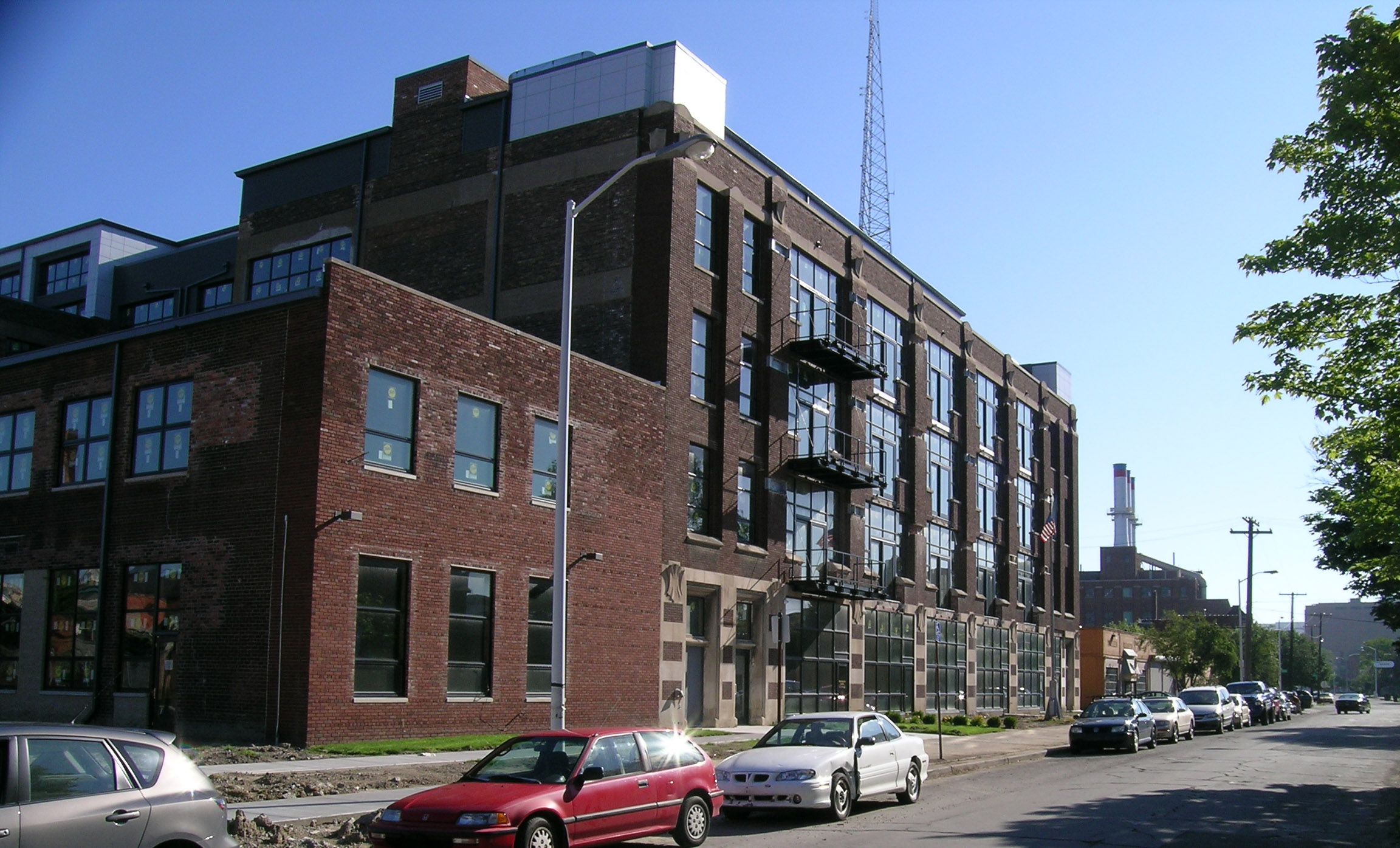
Willis Overland Lofts, on Willis looking east

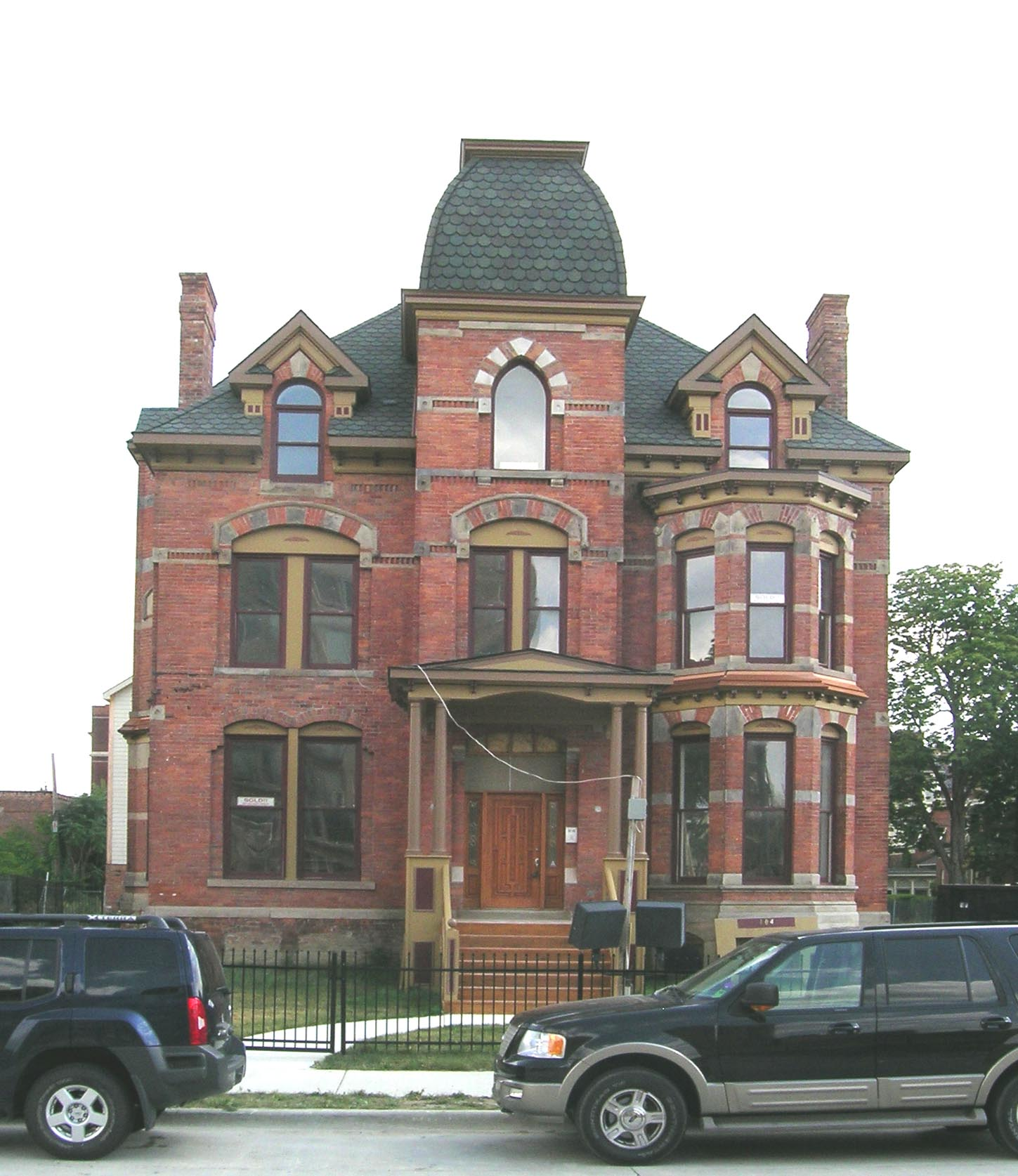
Restoration in 2006 of the Lucien Moore House (1885) in Brush Park

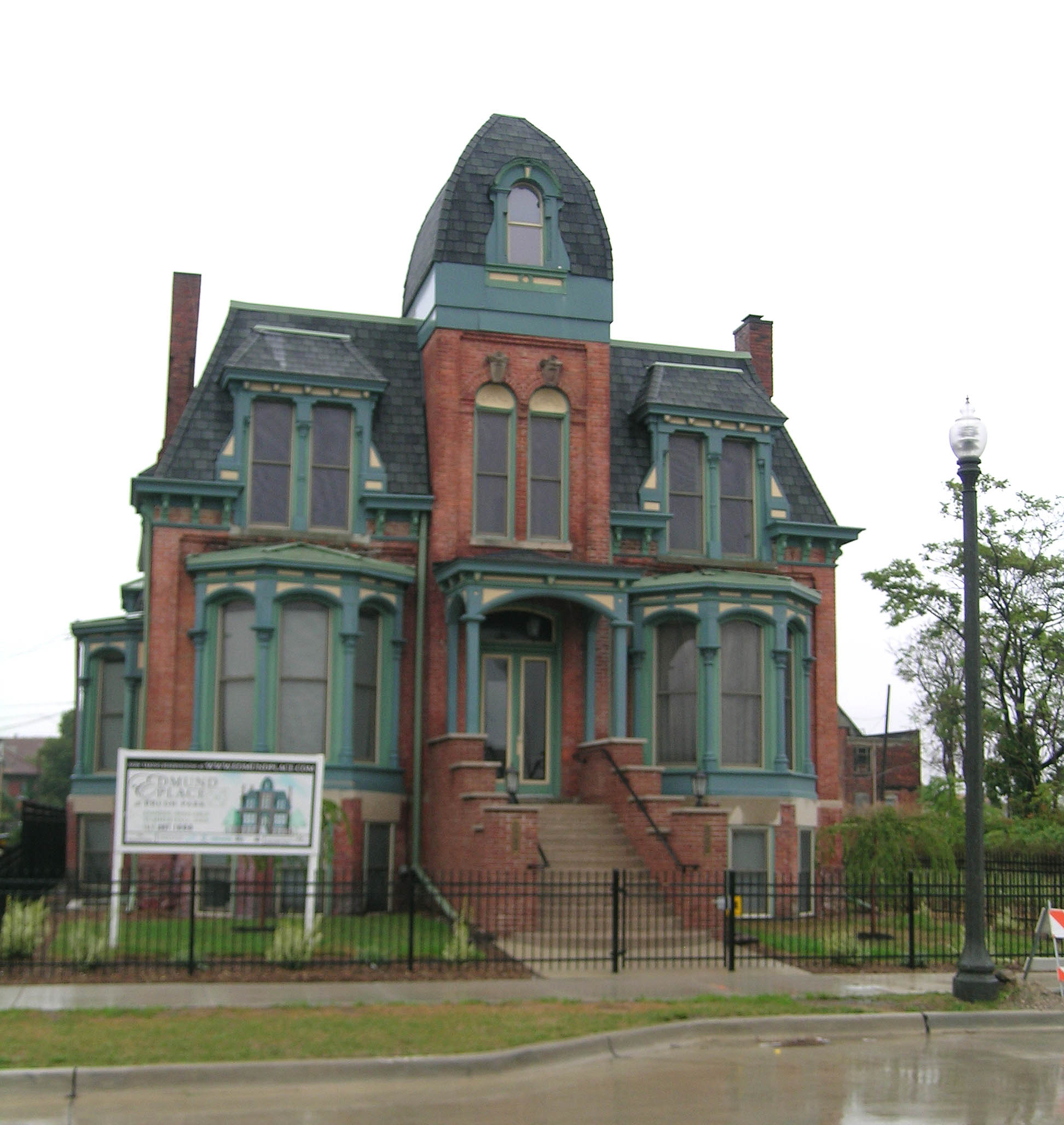
Frederick Butler House in Brush Park

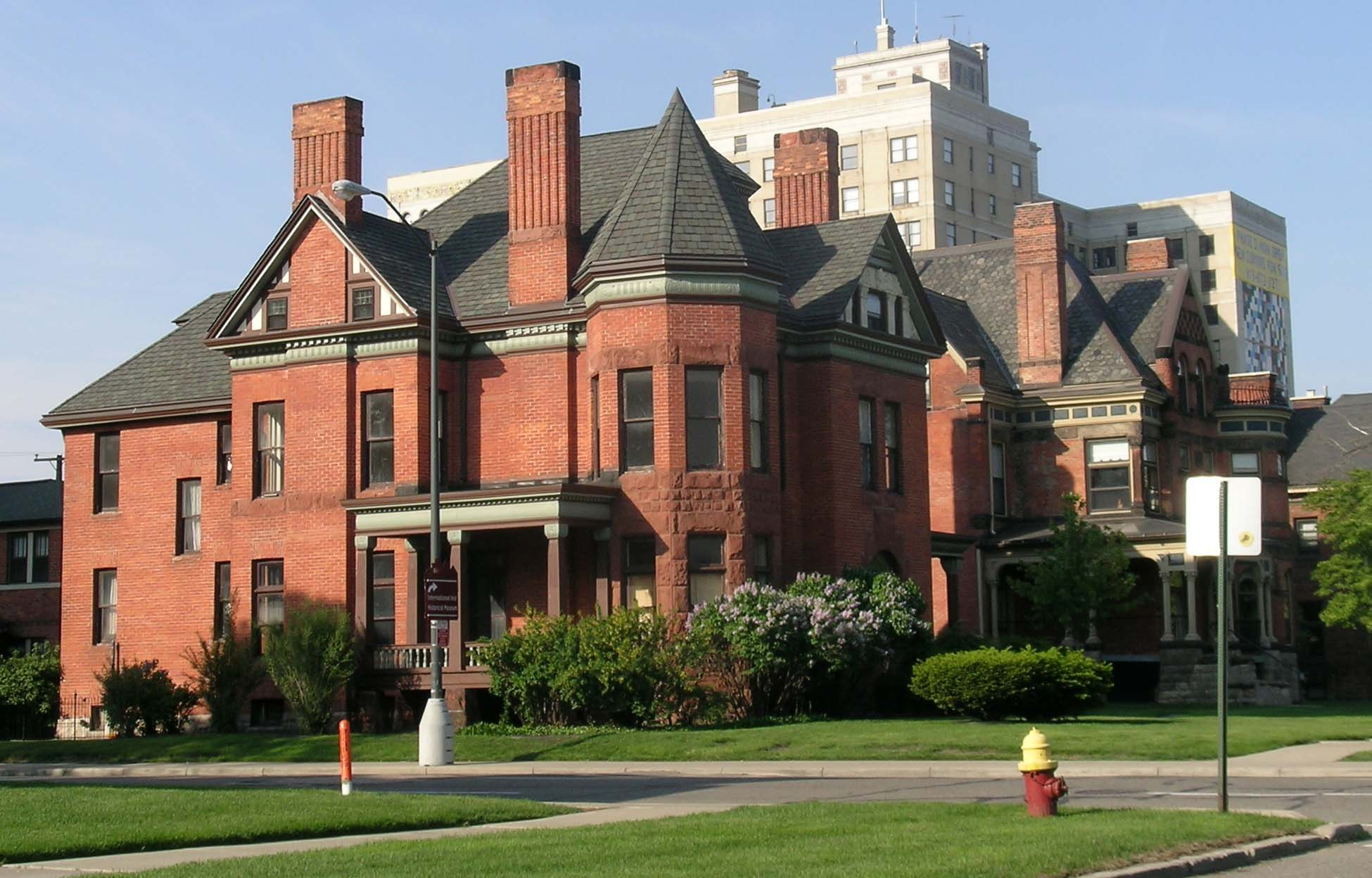
Restored Victorian homes on East Ferry Avenue

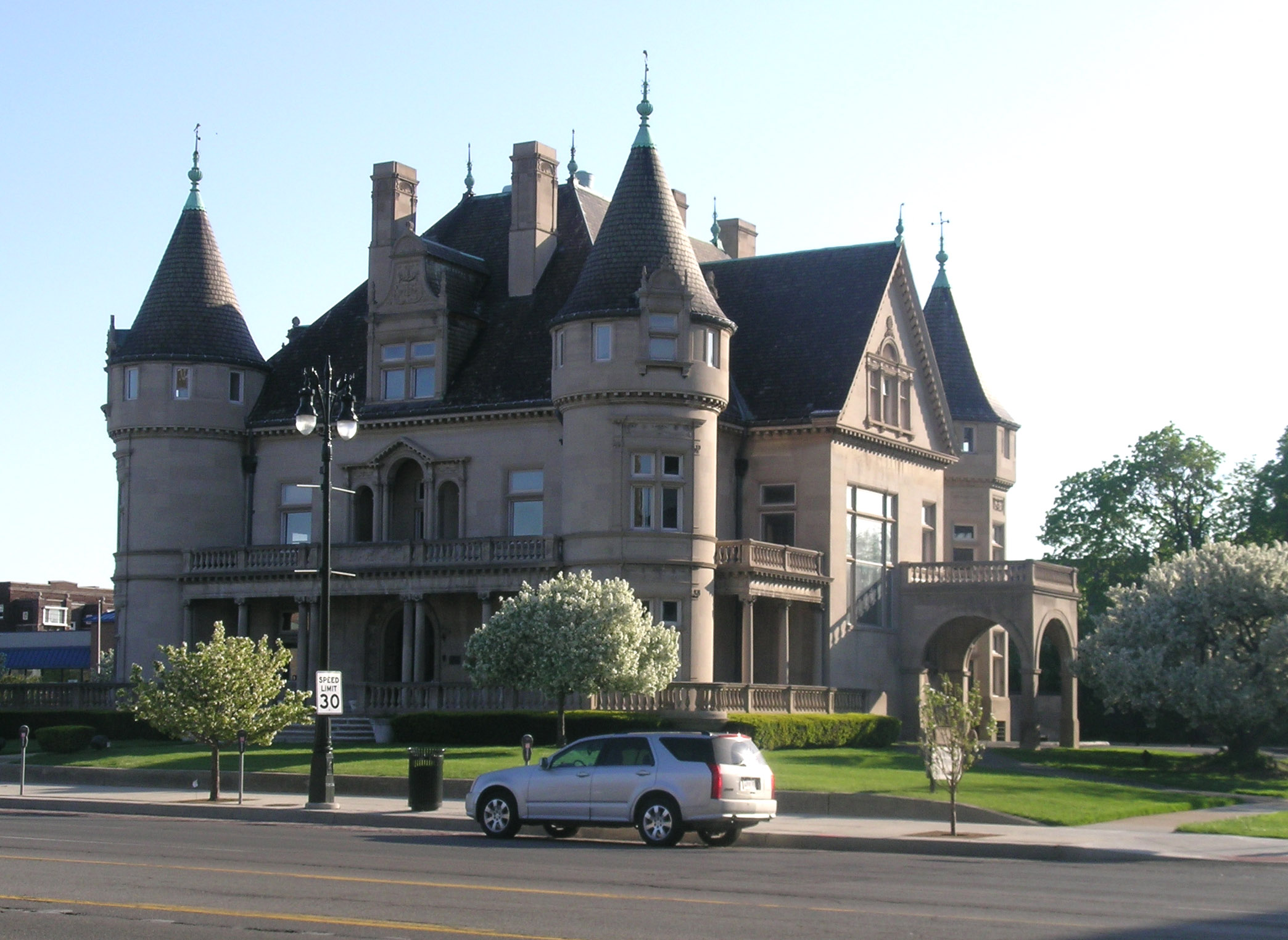
Col. Frank J. Hecker House in the East Ferry Avenue Historic District

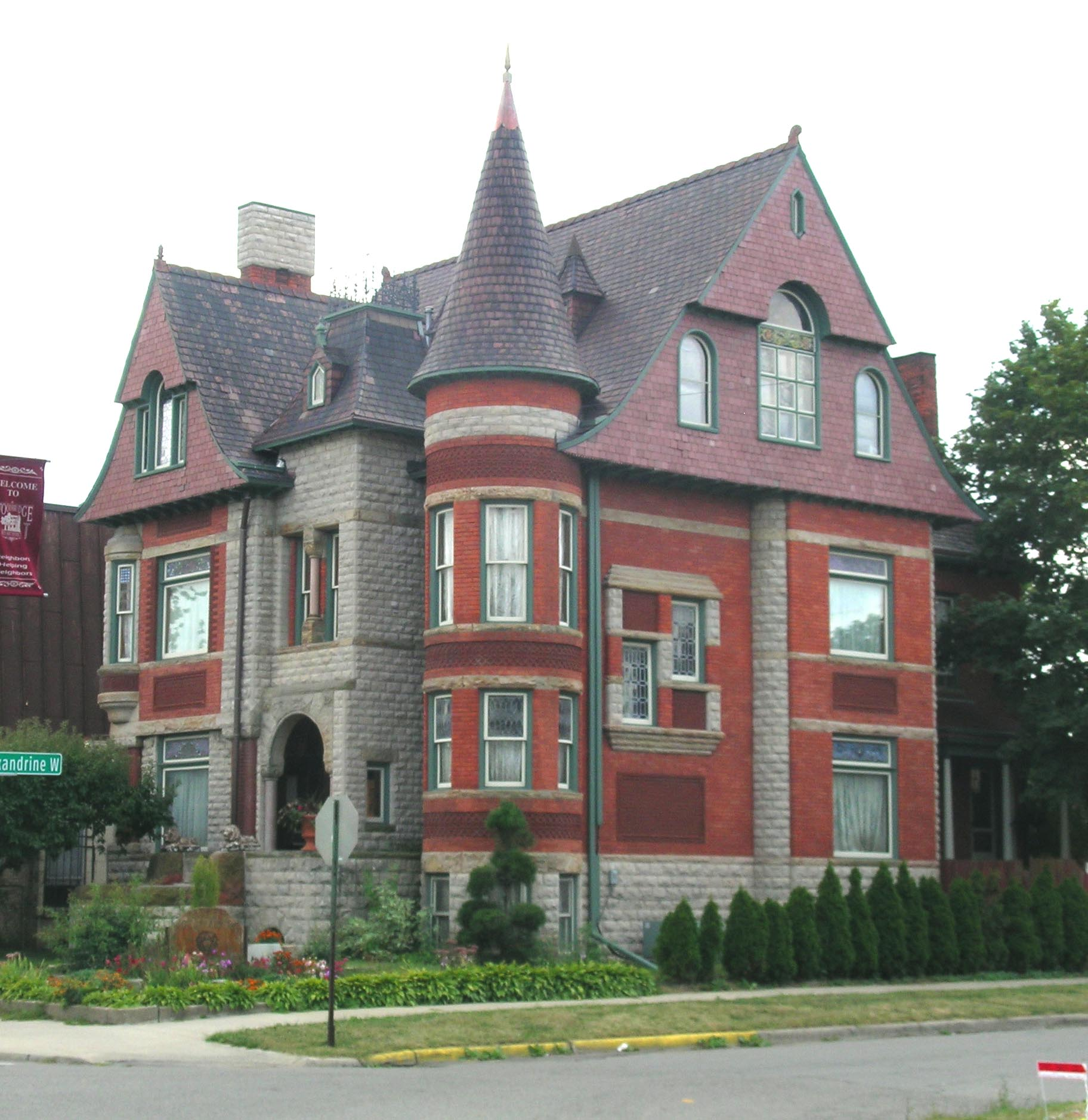
Hunter House in Woodbridge

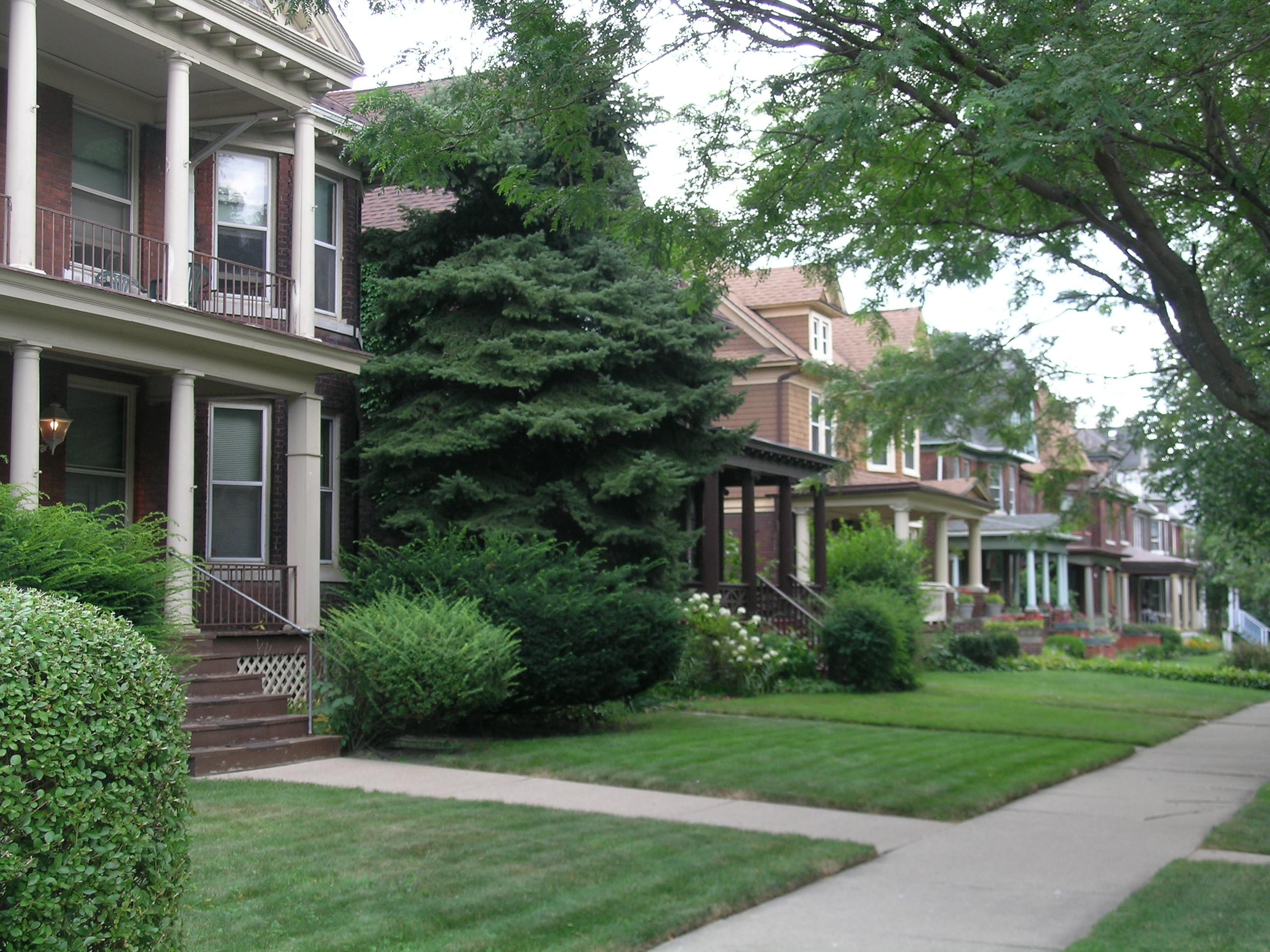
Homes on Avery in Woodbridge

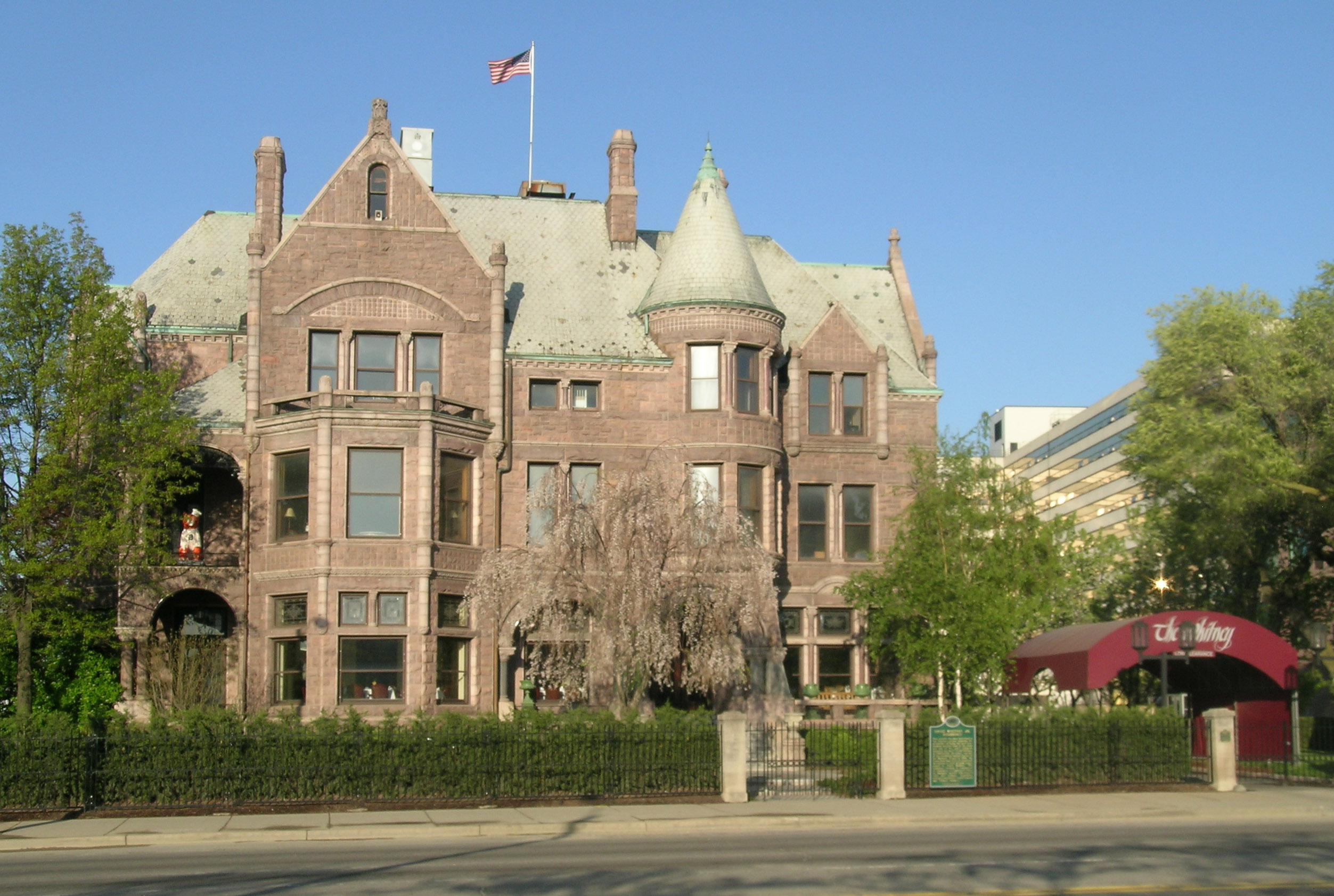
David Whitney House on Woodward Avenue

Name	Image	Location	Summary
Brush Park / Woodward East		Bounded by Alfred, Edmund, Watson, Brush and John R. Sts. 42°20′43″N 83°3′9″W	Brush Park is the 22-block area bounded by Mack to the north, Woodward to the west, Beaubien to the east, and the Fisher Freeway to the south. The Woodward East Historic District, located within the locally designated Brush Park neighborhood, is particularly known for the High Victorian style residences constructed for Detroit's wealthiest citizens. Although many of the once-grand houses have been demolished in recent years, those remaining exhibit a variety of Victorian style subtypes and architectural details.
Cass Corridor		The Cass Corridor is bounded by Woodward Ave. to the East, West Grand Blvd. to the North, the John C. Lodge Freeway to the West, and the Fisher Freeway serves as its southern terminus in Downtown Detroit.	Originally home to some of Detroit's wealthiest residents from the late 19th to mid 20th century, it developed as the hub of urban arts and culture in Detroit. Wayne State University expanded in the area to encompass much of the original Cass Corridor. Little Caesars Arena, the new home of both the Detroit Red Wings and the Detroit Pistons, is in this area.
Cass Park Historic District		Temple, Ledyard, and 2nd at Cass Park; 42°20′28″N 83°3′35″W	This historic district surrounds Cass Park itself, and contains over 20 buildings including apartments, a hotel, the Detroit Masonic Temple, the S. S. Kresge World Headquarters, and Cass Technical High School.
Cass-Davenport Historic District		Roughly bounded Cass Ave., Davenport, and Martin Luther King Jr. Boulevard; 42°20′46″N 83°3′40″W	The Cass-Davenport Historic District includes four apartment buildings near the corner of Cass Avenue and Martin Luther King Boulevard. Two are typical of the small-scale, luxurious apartment buildings built in Detroit near the start of the 20th century and two are typical of the large-scale, high-density apartment buildings constructed between 1915 and 1930.
Cultural Center Historic District		5200, 5201 Woodward Ave., and 100 Farnsworth Ave. 42°21′31″N 83°3′57″W	Woodward Avenue passes through the Cultural Center Historic District which includes: the Detroit Public Library Main Branch, the Detroit Institute of Arts, and the Horace H. Rackham Education Memorial Building.
East Ferry Avenue Historic District		E. Ferry Ave. 42°21′42″N 83°3′56″W	In the mid-1880s, D. M. Ferry platted his seed farm near Woodward into residential lots. East Ferry Avenue was quickly settled by prosperous middle and upper middle class Detroit residents. Although Woodward Avenue has since been redeveloped into primarily commercial property, the mansions and upscale housing on East Ferry survives. The district includes the separately-designated Col. Frank J. Hecker House and the Charles Lang Freer House.
Midtown Woodward Historic District		2951–3424 Woodward Ave., 14 Charlotte St., 10 and 25 PeterboroSt. 42°20′43.5″N 83°3′23.5″W	The Midtown Woodward Historic District spans two blocks along Woodward Avenue, and contains three Alber Kahn-designed structures—the Addison Hotel, Kahn Print Shop, and the Temple Beth-El—in addition to the C. Howard Crane-designed Fine Arts Theatre.
Sugar Hill Historic District		East Forest, Garfield, and East Canfield, between Woodward Avenue on the west and John R. on the east.	An art gallery is located on Forest Ave. On Canfield, one historic properties was recently refurbished into luxury loft condos and office space.
University–Cultural Center		Bounded by the Chrysler Freeway (I-75) on the east, the Lodge Freeway (M-10) on the west, the Grand Trunk Railroad tracks on the north, and Selden Street, Parsons Street, East Willis Street, and East Warren Avenue on the south.42°21′35″N 83°4′9″W	Structures in this Multiple Resource Area are located within Midtown. The section of the University–Cultural Center just beyond Midtown contains the New Amsterdam Historic District and the Piquette Avenue Industrial Historic District.
Warren-Prentis Historic District		Bounded by Woodward, Warren, 3rd, and the alley south of Prentis; 42°21′15″N 83°4′4″W	This district contains a mix of building styles. Upper-class Detroit citizens built single-family homes in the area in 1880–1895. During the same time, apartment living became more popular, and duplexes and small apartment buildings were constructed in the 1890s through the first part of the 20th century. Commercial development was added to the mix in the years after World War I.
Wayne State University		4735–4841 Cass Ave. 42°21′16″N 83°4′2″W	Wayne State is a large university in the heart of Midtown. The Detroit Medical Center and many notable buildings are in the area including the Queen Anne style Mackenzie House, the Hilberry Theater, and Old Main.
West Canfield Historic District		Canfield Ave. between 2nd and 3rd Sts.; also 3rd Ave. between Canfield and Calumet; 42°21′3″N 83°4′4″W	The West Canfield Historic district is located on a primarily residential block of Canfield. Homes in the district are examples of Queen Anne architecture that have remained nearly unchanged since the late 19th century. A boundary increase (added 1997-09-22) added buildings on Third Avenue between Canfield and Calumet to the district.
Willis-Selden Historic District		Bounded by the alley north of W. Willis, Woodward, the alley south of Selden, and 3rd Ave. 42°20′57″N 83°3′52″W	The Willis-Selden Historic District includes a large number of commercial buildings and high-density apartment buildings built in the early 1900s to service Detroit's booming auto economy.

=== Historic structures ===
In addition to the buildings within historic districts, there are numerous historically significant structures located within Midtown. Many of these structures are listed on the National Register of Historic Places, and include structures from three multiple property submissions: the University–Cultural Center Multiple Resource Area Phases I and II, and the Cass Farm Multiple Property Submission. These structures include:

- Churches (First Unitarian Church of Detroit, First Presbyterian Church, Temple Beth-El (Bonstelle Theatre), Chapel of St. Theresa-the Little Flower, Cass Avenue Methodist Episcopal Church, First Congregational Church, Cathedral Church of St. Paul, and Saint Andrew's Memorial Episcopal Church. St. Albertus, St. Josaphat's, and Sweetest Heart of Mary Roman Catholic Churches are adjacent to the East side of Midtown across I-75).
- Clubs (Detroit Masonic Temple, Scarab Club).
- Office and commercial buildings (Metropolitan Center for High Technology, Maccabees Building, Architects Building, Detroit-Columbia Central Office Building, Graybar Electric Company Building, Cass Motor Sales, The Russell).
- Public structures (Orchestra Hall, Garden Bowl, Majestic Theater, Dunbar Hospital).
- Residential buildings (Garfield Lofts, Milner Arms Apartments, League of Catholic Women Building, Coronado Apartments, Helen Newberry Nurses Home, Stuberstone Lofts, Thompson Home, Santa Fe Apartments, Chatsworth Apartments, The Wardell, Belcrest Apartments, Verona Apartments, Lancaster and Waumbek Apartments, Eddystone, 2643 Park Avenue, Hadley Hall).
- Schools (The Clay School, Sts. Peter and Paul Academy, Jefferson Intermediate School).
- Single-family homes (John Harvey House, Bernard Ginsburg House, Elisha Taylor House, Hudson-Evans House, Albert Kahn House, Robert M. and Matilda (Kitch) Grindley House, David Whitney House, Perry McAdow House, William C. Boydell House, Mulford T. Hunter House, George W. Loomer House, Samuel L. Smith House, Herman Strasburg House, Charles Lang Freer House, Col. Frank J. Hecker House, Thomas S. Sprague House).
- Utility buildings (Detroit Edison Company Willis Avenue Station).

== History ==
=== 1800–1870 ===
The area that is now Midtown was first platted after the disastrous 1805 fire in Detroit, when the United States Congress authorized the platting of a new village at Detroit. Land titles were granted to settle remaining uncertainty over the ownership of some parcels, which was in part due to the then fairly recent departure of British colonial forces. During this platting, congress authorized the platting of land north of Detroit on both sides of the main thoroughfare, Woodward Avenue. These lots were known as the "Park Lots."

The section of Midtown to the west of the Park Lots is known as the "Cass Farm" area, after the name of one of the original ribbon farms that ran north from the river through the area. The original Cass Farm ran between what is now Cass Avenue and Third Avenue. In 1816, Lewis Cass purchased the ribbon farm. The property was gradually developed over the years, with the sections closest to the river being developed first. By the time Cass died in 1866, a few of the blocks north of Martin Luther King Boulevard had just been platted. Cass's children continued to plat the area after his death. Two more farms ran through Midtown west of Woodward: the Jones/Crane Farm, named for De Garmo Jones, onetime mayor of Detroit, which was located between what is now Third Avenue and the alley east of Fourth Street; and the Forsythe Farm, located between what is now Fourth Street and the Lodge Freeway.

To the east of the Park Lots, the ribbon farm running through the midtown area was owned by John Askin, an Irish trader. Askin's daughter Adelaide married Elijah Brush, the scion of the well-known Brush family of Detroit; the farm passed on to the couple and eventually their son Edmund. Edmund Brush began subdividing the farm in the latter half of the 19th century.

Despite the early date of the platting of the Park Lots, development of the area was slow at first, as early 19th century growth in Detroit occurred primarily east and west of Woodward, along Fort Street and Jefferson Avenue. Even into the 1840s, only a handful of buildings, presumably farm structures, were located in the area. The first east-west street in what is now Brush Park, in the southern section of Midtown, was not opened until 1852.

It wasn't until during the Civil War, as the downtown district became more business-oriented, that northern Woodward Avenue began to be developed. Construction turned the area that is now Midtown into a primarily upscale, quiet residential district, far from the hustle of the city center. Urban development of the area accelerated in 1870, when the population of Detroit was nearly 80,000. Streetcar lines established in the 1860s allowed residents to more conveniently travel from the Midtown area to downtown.

=== 1870–1910 ===
The West Canfield Historic District, platted in 1871, was one of the first recorded subdivisions in the area. The district features large and expensive lots, and many prominent Detroiters settled on the block. A severe depression slowed development, but it picked up again in the late 1870s. The period from 1880 to 1895 brought a boom in the construction of elegant single-family and duplex homes in the Midtown area. The lots on Woodward were the most expensive and featured the most opulent homes; the lots immediately off the main street were soon filled with the homes of Detroit's upper class. School and religious buildings were also constructed in the area.

As Detroit grew, the demand for apartment housing also grew; beginning in 1895, the construction in the Cass Farm area began to focus more on small apartment buildings. This was particularly true in the last portion of the district to be developed, the section south of Warren between Cass and Third. Here a number of small-scale apartment buildings were constructed around the start of the 20th century.

=== 1910–1930 ===
As the city continued to expand, the character of the neighborhood changed. Even before World War I, the congestion along Woodward precipitated a change from upper-class housing to commercial ventures. The rise of the automobile made more distant neighborhoods such as Boston-Edison and Indian Village easily accessible from the center of Detroit, and families of means moved out of the stately houses along Woodward and in Brush Park.

The construction of Orchestra Hall heralded a City Beautiful movement that turned much of the area into public-oriented space; the idea of turning Midtown into a cultural mecca continued with the construction of the library and the DIA in the 1920s.

The rise of the automobile also changed the area. Midtown's proximity to the automotive plants in the Milwaukee Junction area made it ideal for housing auto workers. During the 1910s and 1920s, larger apartment buildings were constructed in the area, and many remaining single-family homes were converted into boardinghouses. Commercial usage also increased in the area, particularly in automotive-related sectors: showrooms, service stations, and part supply businesses.

=== 1930–present ===
The Great Depression heralded a downturn for the Midtown area. Newly constructed buildings fell into foreclosure, and many of the formerly well-paid auto workers living in the area were out of work. By the time the recovery from World War II stimulated the economy, industry had relocated to the suburbs, and the area gradually became more residential.

During the Great Depression, many of the older mansions were subdivided into apartments, and as demand for housing fell after World War II.

In the 1950s, demolition of out-moded houses and businesses began, a practice that extended into the 1980s. Wayne State University also began to have more influence in the area, rehabilitating old buildings and building new ones in the northwestern section of the neighborhood. The current boundaries of Midtown were also delineated when the interstate freeways through Detroit were built, particularly the Chrysler Freeway (I-75) on the east, the Lodge Freeway (M-10) on the west, the Edsel Ford Freeway (I-94) on the north, and the Fisher Freeway (I-75) on the south. The Chrysler followed the course of Hastings Street, the center of African-American life in Detroit at the time. To house displaced residents, the Brewster-Douglass Housing Projects were built in the far east of the Midtown area, near the Chrysler and what once had been the thriving Hastings Street community.

As the focus shifted to revitalization in the 1990s, more structures in the area have been refurbished, by Wayne State, other public groups, and by private parties.

In September 2005 the company Lovio George Inc., located at Forest and Third in Detroit, revealed a new logo for Midtown Detroit.

In 2011, Midtown's apartment buildings were 94% occupied.

== Economy ==
Midtown Detroit is home the Detroit Medical Center, the largest private employer in the city of Detroit with more than 12,000 employees. The DMC has more than 2,000 licensed beds and 3,000 affiliated physicians. The DMC is the affiliated clinical research site for medical program at Wayne State University, the nation's fourth largest medical school. On March 19, 2010, Vanguard Health Systems announced plans to invest nearly $1.5 B in Detroit Medical Center, including $850 M for expansion and renovation, and $417 M to retire debts, pending approval of its acquisition.

The newspaper Metro Times moved to the Arnold E. Frank Building in Midtown in 2017.

== Demographics ==
In 2016, an estimated 20,000 people lived in Midtown Detroit, a 7 percent increase since 2013.

The neighborhood has one of the lowest crime rates in city, in part due to its relationship with the Wayne State University Police who patrol the neighborhood in addition to the Detroit Police. From 2008 to 2015, crime decreased 52 percent in Midtown compared to 18 percent in the city overall.

Midtown Detroit – Racial and ethnic composition. Midtown Detroit includes all census tracts that are located inside the freeways that border Midtown. Hispanics/Latinos may be of any race.
Race / Ethnicity (NH = Non-Hispanic)	Pop 2000	Pop 2010	Pop 2020	% 2000	% 2010	% 2020
White alone (NH)	3,132	3,488	5,633	18.56%	23.97%	33.29%
Black or African American alone (NH)	11,708	9,117	8,457	69.37%	62.66%	49.98%
Native American or Alaska Native alone (NH)	76	61	48	0.45%	0.42%	0.28%
Asian alone (NH)	1,285	1,112	1,630	7.61%	7.64%	9.63%
Native Hawaiian or Pacific Islander alone (NH)	6	3	10	0.04%	0.02%	0.06%
Other race alone (NH)	30	24	120	0.18%	0.16%	0.71%
Mixed race or Multiracial (NH)	319	435	572	1.89%	2.99%	3.38%
Hispanic or Latino (any race)	321	310	451	1.96%	2.13%	2.67%
Total	16,877	14,550	16,921	100.00%	100.00%	100.00%

== Education ==
=== Colleges and universities ===
Wayne State University is located in Midtown. The College for Creative Studies is also located in Midtown and is one of the top art schools in the country. Additionally, the University of Michigan Detroit Center and Michigan State University Detroit Center are both located in the Midtown district.

=== Primary and secondary schools ===
The area is zoned to Detroit Public Schools. At one time DPS had its headquarters in the Maccabees Building in Midtown. In 2002 the district paid the owner of the Fisher Building $24.1 million in so the district could occupy five floors in the building; the Fisher Building in the New Center area now serves as the DPS headquarters.

Three K-8 schools, Golightly and Spain in Midtown and Edmonson outside of Midtown, serve portions of Midtown. All residents are zoned to Martin Luther King High School, outside of Midtown.

The DPS magnet schools Cass Technical High School and Detroit School of Arts are also in Midtown.

Midtown also houses two campuses of the University Prep Schools charter school system:

- University Prep Academy Middle School
- University Prep Science & Math Middle School

=== History of schools ===
Prior to its closure, Murray-Wright High School served Midtown Detroit. At one point in the first decade of the 21st century a portion of Midtown was served by Dewey PK-8 for elementary school, while a portion was served by Edmonson Elementary. Two separate portions of Midtown were served by Golightly K-8 and Spain PK-8 for elementary school. At one point in the first decade of the 21st century a portion of Midtown was served by Dewey PK-8 for middle school, while another section was served by Sherrard PK-8 for middle school; during that time Spain PK-8 served the rest of Midtown. Previously Malcolm X K-8 in Midtown and Burton K-8 outside of Midtown served portions of Midtown.

Prior to its 2012 closure, the Detroit Day School for the Deaf was located adjacent to Midtown.

=== Public libraries ===
Detroit Public Library operates the Main Library in Midtown. The current library facility opened on March 21, 1921. The extension wings of the facility opened on June 23, 1963.

== See also ==
- Corktown
- New Center
- North Corktown
