= Old Main (Wayne State University) =

Academic building in Detroit, Michigan, U.S.

- U.S. Historic district – Contributing property
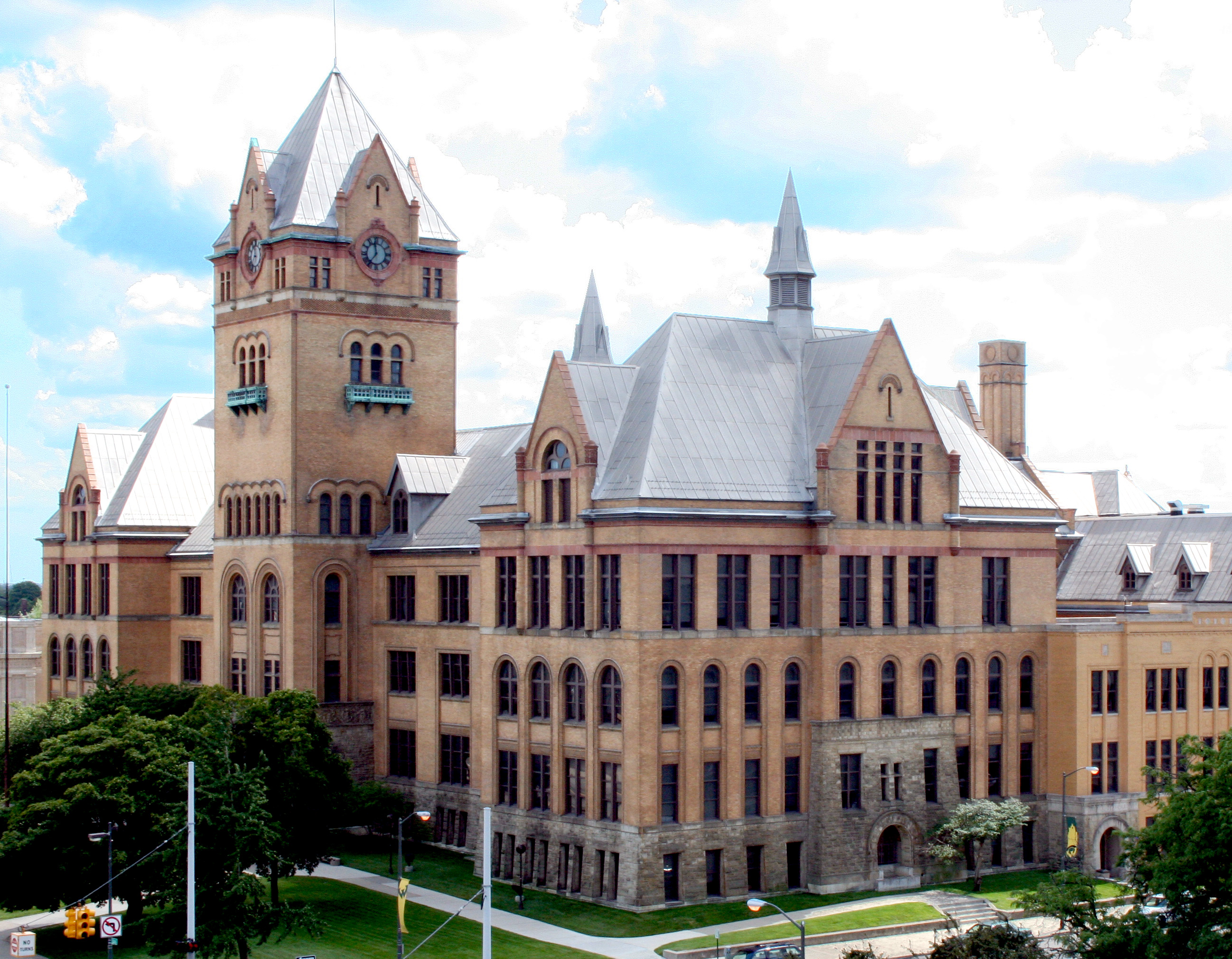
- Interactive map of Old Main
- Location: 4841 Cass Avenue, Detroit, Michigan, U.S.
- Coordinates: 42°21′18.61″N 83°4′0.50″W
- Built: 1895
- Architects: Malcomson & Higginbotham; Field, Hinchman & Smith
- Architectural style: Romanesque Revival, Queen Anne
- Part of: Wayne State University Buildings (ID78001524)
- Added to NRHP: June 23, 1978

Old Main is an academic building on the campus of Wayne State University. It is located at 4841 Cass Avenue in Midtown Detroit, Michigan, United States, on Wayne's main campus.

== Location ==
Old Main is located on the southwest corner of the intersection of Cass and Warren Ave. in the busy Midtown area of Detroit. Old Main is situated at the southern end of the main campus of Wayne State University, across Warren from the Science Building and just north of the college's Hilberry Theater. It stands approximately 1.5 miles north of downtown Detroit, one block west of the city's main street, Woodward Avenue, and within less than a mile of three of Detroit's major freeways, the Chrysler (I-75), the Lodge (M-10), and the Ford (I-94).

== History ==
The building now known as Old Main was originally built as Detroit's Central High School. Construction of the building began on December 13, 1894. It was built over a three-year period out of brick and limestone quarried from the land directly in front of it. The structure was designed by architects Malcomson & Higginbotham and contained 103 classrooms, laboratories, offices, and space for 2,000 students. The building cost $573,345.13, most of which was paid for by state appropriations and an emergency building fund campaign.

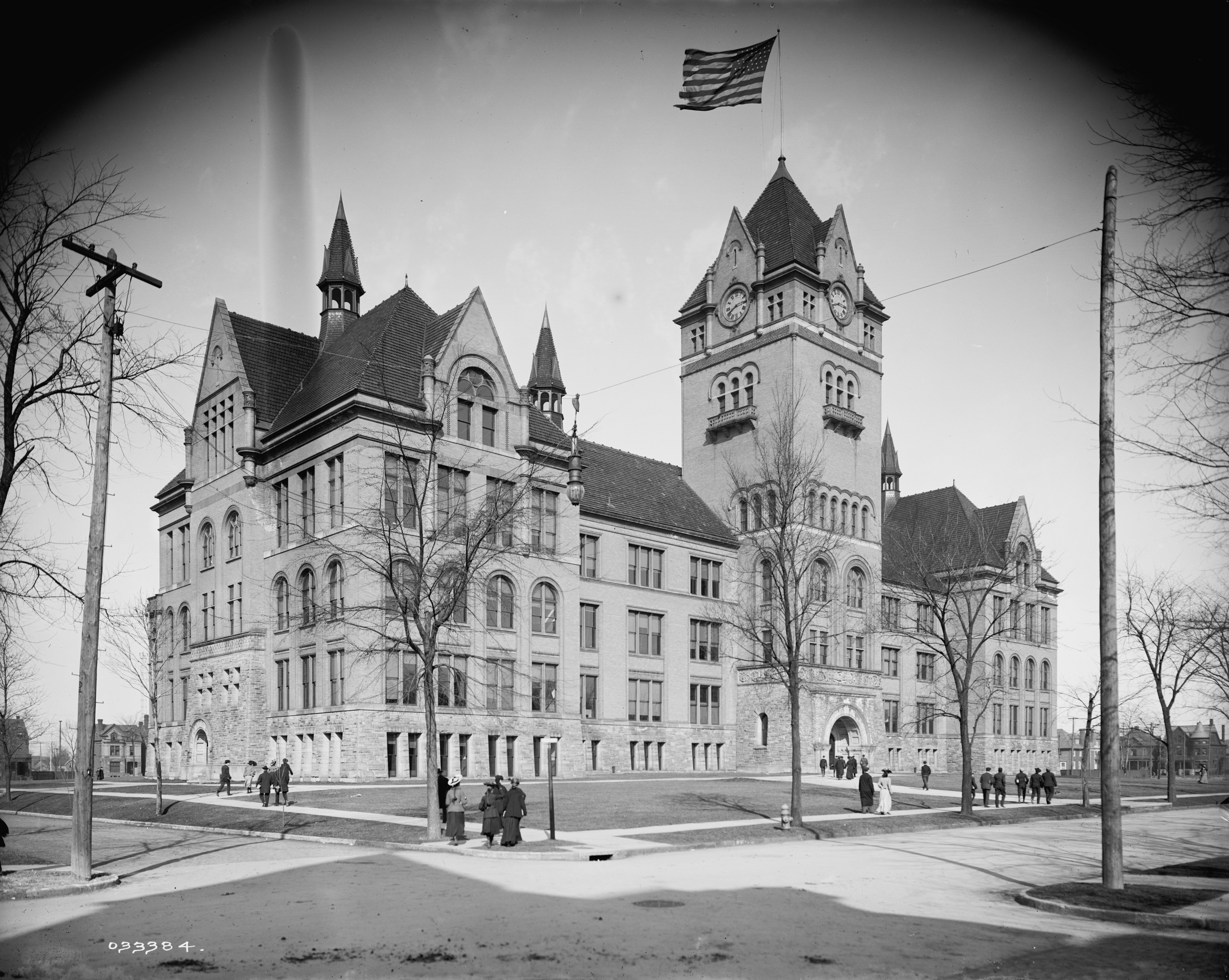
Central High School (Old Main), c. 1904

Central High School moved to this new location from its previous home in the former Michigan State Capitol building in downtown Detroit's Capitol Park, which had burned down in 1893. Central High began classes here in 1896 as the building neared completion. As the number of students grew, a large wing was added to the rear of the building in 1908. In 1913 the high school began offering some college-level courses, and in 1917 the new two-year Detroit Junior College began to operate in the building. In 1923 this would become the four-year degree granting College of the City of Detroit, one of the main precursor institutions of today's Wayne State University.

By 1926 the building had become overcrowded and Central High School was moved to its present location at 2425 Tuxedo St. The building was then given over entirely to the college and was renamed as the Main Building. As the college has grown around it and evolved, first to Wayne University in 1934, and then to Wayne State University in 1956, the building came to be affectionately known as "Old Main".

As time has passed, many modifications and repairs have been made to the aging structure. During the 1930s and 1940s, new walls, rooms, and other changes were made inside the building. The clock in the tower was replaced in 1934, along with the rest of the building's clocks that were linked to it. The building was enlarged with a new wing along the Warren Ave. side in 1937. By the 1980s though, falling ceilings, peeling paint, vandalism, a fire, plumbing failures, leaking roofs, and deferred maintenance had taken their toll on Old Main. To remedy the situation Wayne State University launched a fund raising campaign in 1995, and later sought state assistance. As a result, large-scale renovations of the structure were begun that year. Electrical and mechanical systems were replaced, and much of the building restored to its original look.

Today, the renovated Old Main serves as the home of the College of Liberal Arts and Sciences of Wayne State University as well as accommodating many other classes in a wide variety of subjects. Old Main now reflects the university's history, growth and development, and is widely seen as the symbol of Wayne State University.

== Departments ==
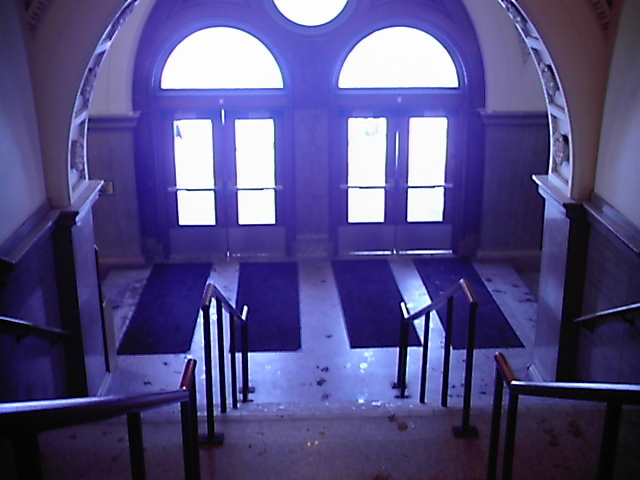
The Main Entrance

- Planetarium (Basement)

Department of Geology (Basement)

- Office of the Department of Geology
- Mineralogy/Petrology Lab
- Audio Tutorial Lab (Geology 1010 Lab)
- Structural/Geomorphology Lab
- Mineral Collections

Museum of Anthropology (1st floor)

- Map Room
- Library
- Museum office
- Archaeology Laboratory

Department of Music (1st floor)

- Schaver Music Recital hall
- Recording Studio

College of Liberal Arts and Sciences (2nd Floor)

College of Fine Performing and Communication Arts (2nd Floor)

- Maggie Allesee Department of Dance
- Department of Art and Art History (Partial)

College of Fine Performing and Communication Arts
Fashion and Design (2nd Floor)

- Textile Lab
- Clothing Design
- Dorothea June Grossbart Historic Costume Collection

Department of Art and Art History (2nd Floor)

- Interior Design
- Interiors Library
- Interior Studio
- Interior Lighting Lab
- Fibers
- Fiber Dye Lab
- Weaving Studio
- Fiber Studio

Department of Music (2nd Floor)

- Music Technology Lab
- Piano Lab
- Prof. Poole Memorial Orchestral Library
- Large Ensemble Rehearsal Room
- Jazz Rehearsal Room

Department of Art and Art History (3rd Floor)

- Painting
- Drawing
- Graphic Design
- Interdisciplinary Electronic Arts

Department of Theatre (3rd Floor)

- Computer Labs
- Two Theatre Movement Studios
- Design Studios

Department of Dance (3rd Floor)

- Dance Studios
- Music Department Practice Rooms (4th Floor)

Department of Film and Media Arts & Studies (4th Floor)

- Editing Suites
- TV Studio & Control Room

Department of Photography (4th Floor)

- Photography Computer Lab
- Photography Studios
- Photography Dark Room
- Photography Lab

== See also ==
- Wayne State University Buildings
