= Clay Office and Conference Center =

Historic building in Detroit, Michigan, US

- Clay School
- U.S. National Register of Historic Places
- Michigan State Historic Site
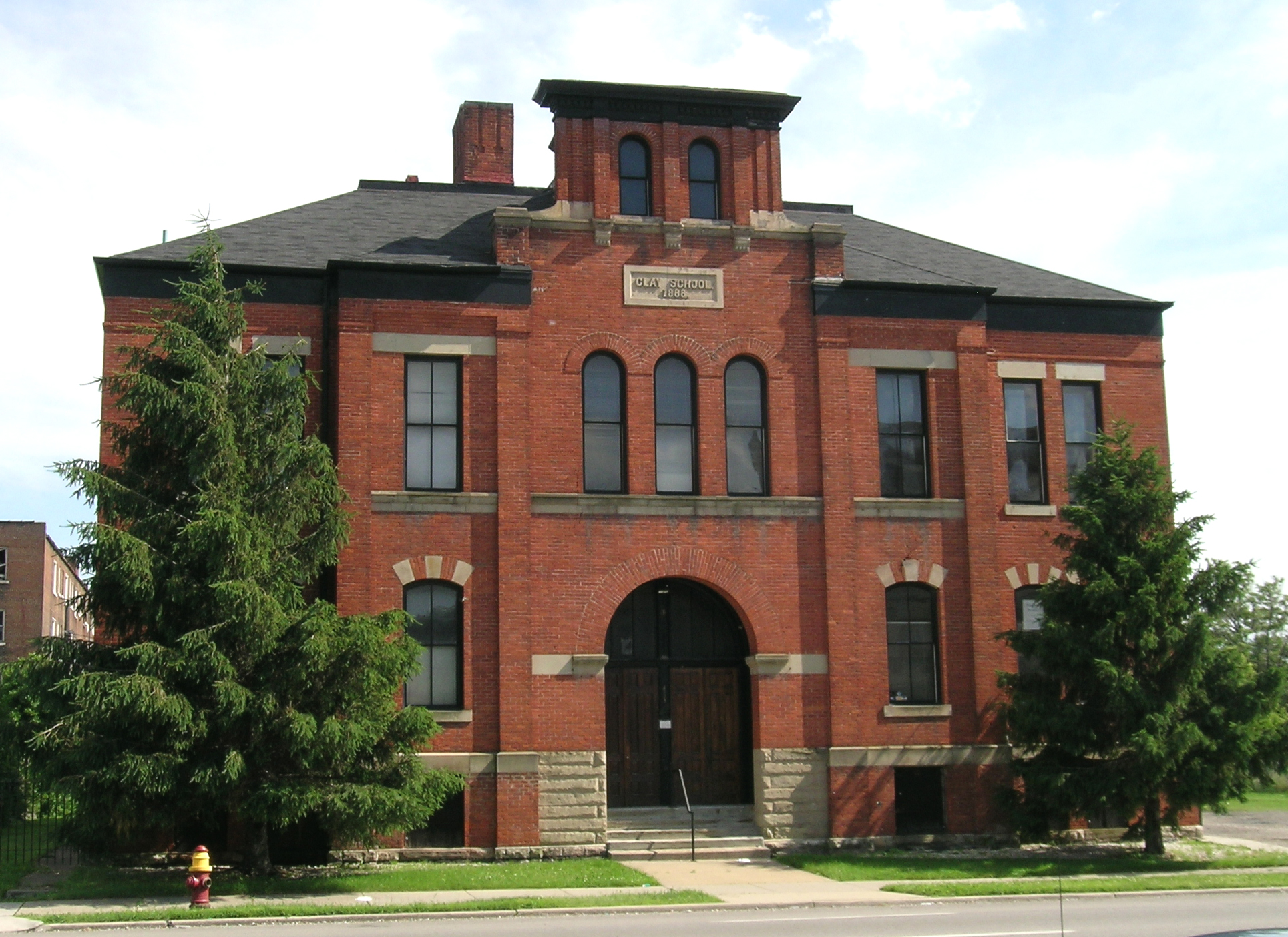
- Interactive map
- Location: 453 Martin Luther King, Jr. Boulevard; Detroit, Michigan
- Coordinates: 42°20′42″N 83°3′42″W
- Built: 1888
- Architect: J.B. Tarleton
- Architectural style: Late Victorian
- NRHP reference No.: 82002913

Significant dates
- Added to NRHP: July 8, 1982
- Designated MSHS: September 8, 1982

The Clay Office and Conference Center is a renovated office complex formerly known as the Clay School. It is located at 453 Martin Luther King, Jr. Boulevard in Midtown Detroit, Michigan. It is the oldest school building in the city of Detroit. It was listed on the National Register of Historic Places and designated a Michigan State Historic Site in 1982.

== History ==
In 1873, a frame schoolhouse was built at this location to serve the children living in the area. In 1888, the frame school was moved to the north side of the city and replaced by the current structure. The building was designed by architect J.B. Tarleton, who served as the architect for the Detroit Board of Education from 1884 to 1890. This is the only school he designed that is still standing.

The building served as an elementary school until 1923. For the next eight years, it was a center for boys with discipline problems, and it was later used as headquarters for vocational study and as administrative offices for the Practical Nursing Center. In 1981, the building was sold to a developer, who converted the building into office space.

== Architecture ==
The Clay School is a two-story brick structure, measuring 72 feet by 80 feet, with a high basement and hipped roof. The basement is marked at the top with a line of exterior stones. The front facade has a central pavilion with an arched entryway decorated in stone. The central projecting tower was originally topped with a wooden cupola, which was removed in the 1970s.

Inside, the first and second floors each contain four classrooms with coat rooms. The basement level contains the boiler room and bathrooms. The interior contains the original trim, including beaded wainscoting in the hallways, wooden classroom doors with transoms, molded window and door trim, high baseboards and hardwood floors.
