= Wayne State University Buildings =

Historic district in Michigan, United States

- U.S. National Register of Historic Places
- U.S. Historic district
- Michigan State Historic Site
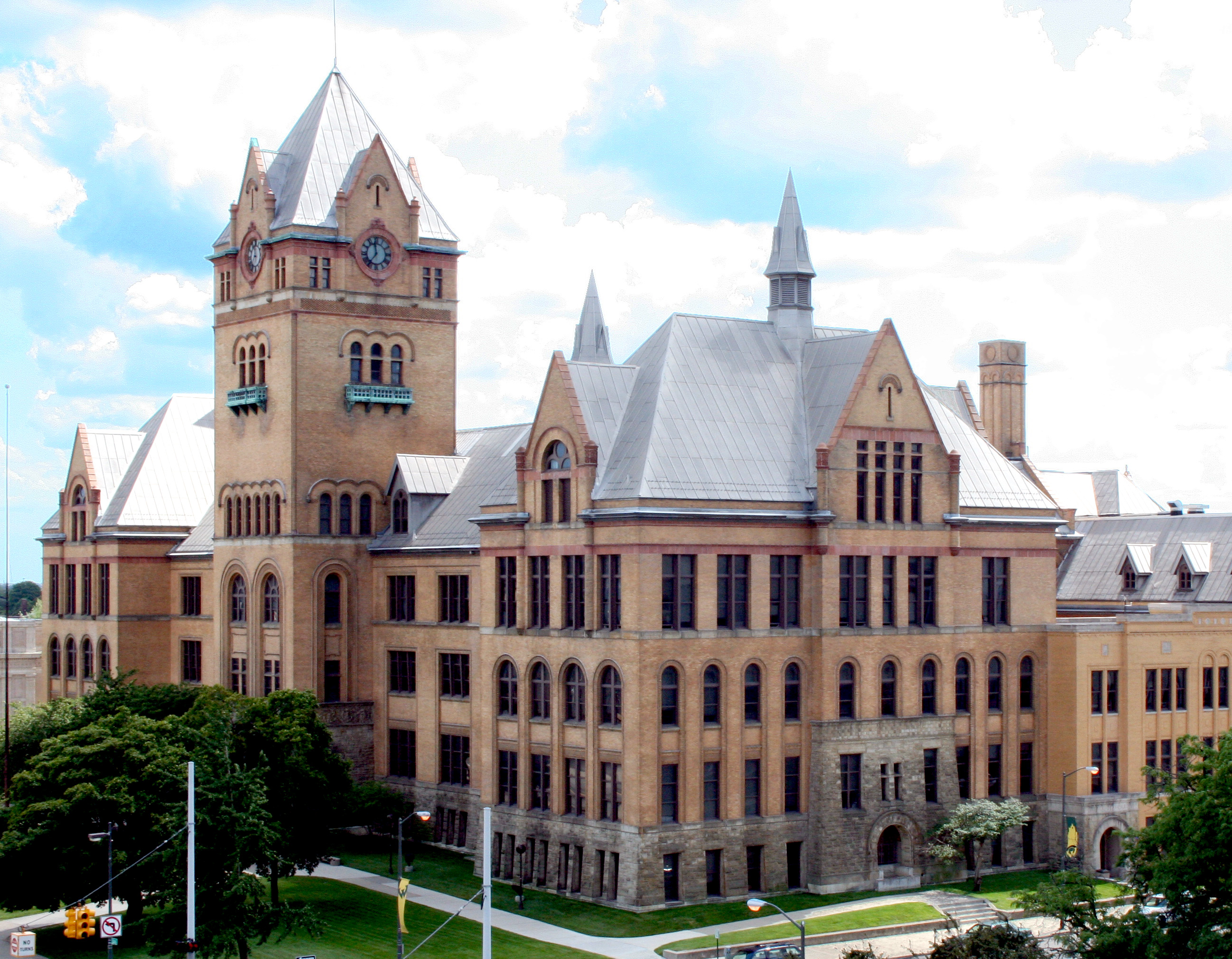
- Old Main on WSU campus
- Interactive map
- Location: Detroit, Michigan, U.S.
- Coordinates: 42°21′16″N 83°4′2″W
- Built: 1895
- Architect: Malcomson & Higginbotham; Field, Hinchman & Smith
- Architectural style: Neoclassical, Queen Anne
- NRHP reference No.: 78001524

Significant dates
- Added to NRHP: June 23, 1978
- Designated MSHS: January 19, 1957

The Wayne State University historic district consists of three buildings on 4735-4841 Cass Avenue in Midtown Detroit, Michigan: the Mackenzie House (4735 Cass), Hilberry Theatre (4743 Cass), and Old Main (4841 Cass), all on the campus of Wayne State University. The buildings were designated a Michigan State Historic Site in 1957 and listed on the National Register of Historic Places in 1978.

== Mackenzie House ==
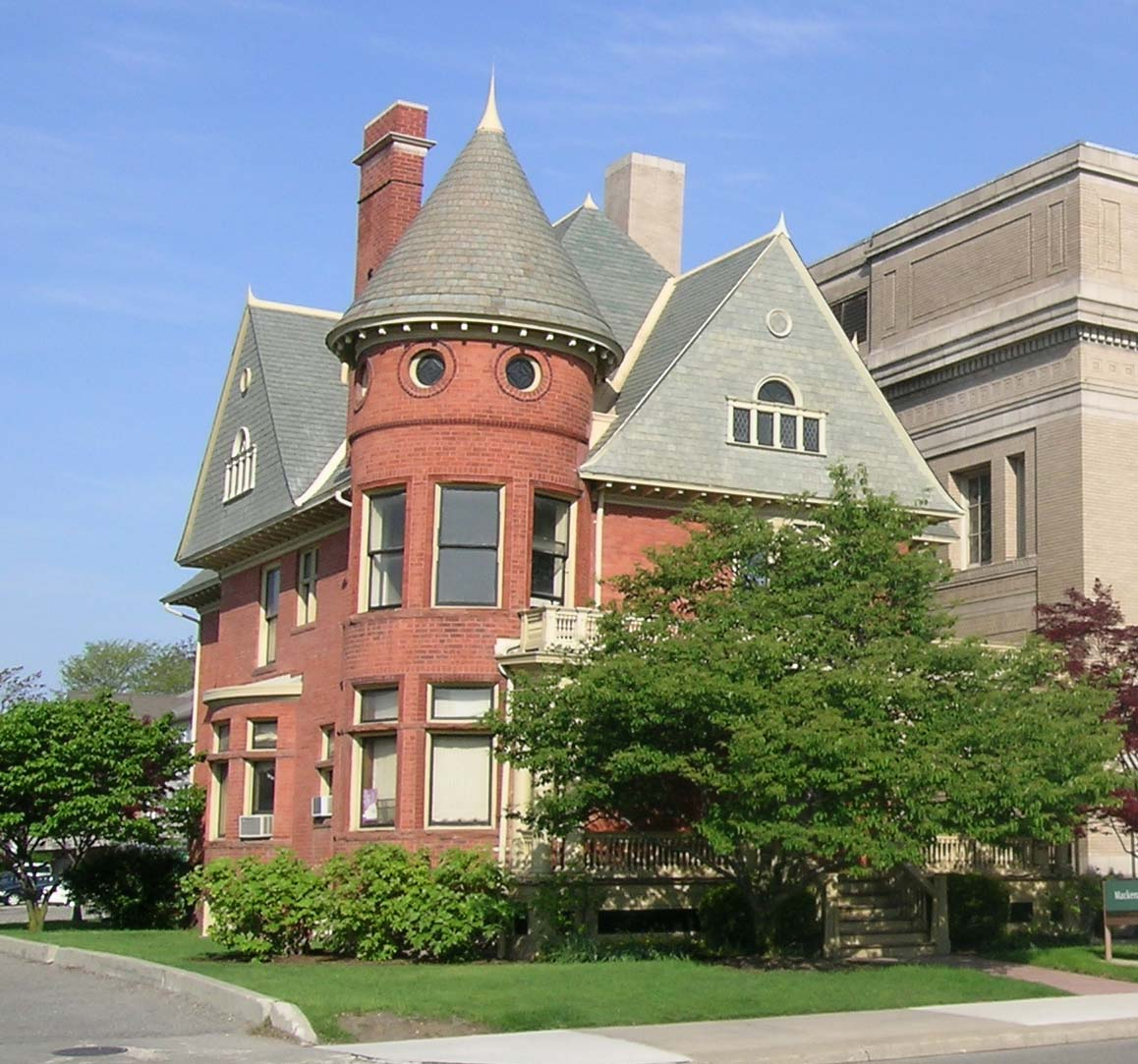
Mackenzie House (the Hilberry Theatre is to the right)

The Mackenzie House is a Queen Anne house designed by Malcomson and Higginbotham and built in 1895. The original occupant was Detroit banker Frank Blackman. In 1906, David Mackenzie, principal of Central High School and founder of the College of the City of Detroit, moved into the house, where he lived until his death. His widow, Esther, continued living there until 1935. After Esther moved out, Wayne State University acquired the house, using it as the headquarters of the Women's Guild. It later provided office space for a number of other entities in the university.

In the mid-1970s, the Mackenzie House was slated for demolition, until a group of Wayne State students protested. Their successful effort created a new organization, Preservation Wayne. The building now serves as the offices of the organization, renamed Preservation Detroit. In 2018, plans were made to move the house to a new location within the same block to make room for the Hilberry Gateway Performance Project. The house was moved in April 2019.

The Mackenzie House is a two-and-a-half-story red brick structure with a prominent round tower with a conical turret on one corner of the facade. A large wooden porch wraps around the opposing corner and shelters the front entrance. The building has a slate hipped roof with gables.

== Hilberry Theatre ==
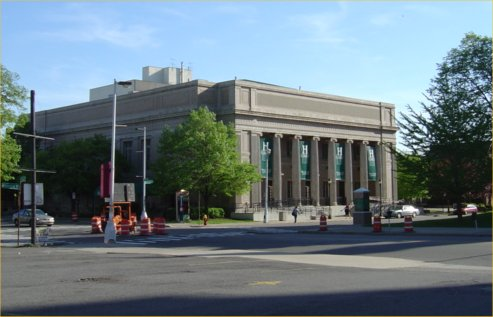
Hilberry Theatre

The Hilberry Theatre was designed by the architectural firm of Field, Hinchman and Smith (predecessor of Smith, Hinchman and Grylls) and built in 1916-17 as the First Church of Christ Scientist. The auditorium was designed to seat more than 1,500 congregants. The Christian Science congregation used the building until 1961, when they sold it to Wayne State University. Wayne State remodeled the interior to create a theatre to seat 532 people, serving as a repertory theater. The building was re-christened in honor of Clarence B. Hilberry, the fourth president of WSU, and reopened in January 1964. The university continues to use the building to house its repertory theatre. In 2018, ground was broken on a major expansion project, the Hilberry Gateway Performance Complex.

The Hilberry Theatre is a large rectangular two-story neoclassical building measuring 125 feet by 150 feet. The front facade is of a Roman temple design with six fluted ionic columns flanked by two half columns supporting an entablature. Behind the columns are seven recessed bays with alternating doors and windows on the first floor and windows above on the second. The two floors are separated by a belt course. The side facade facing Cass is of a similar form as the front facade.

== Old Main ==
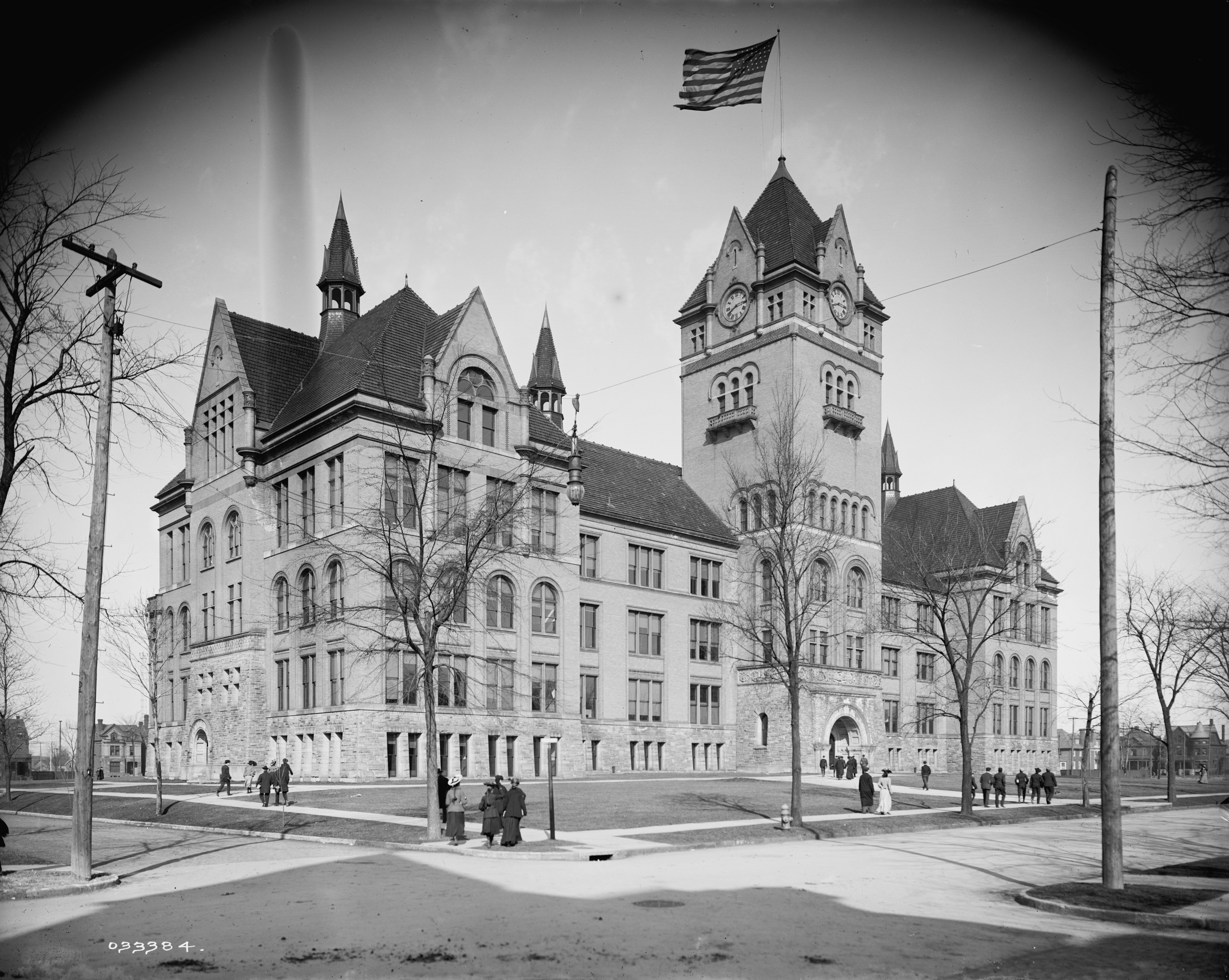
Old Main, c. 1904

Old Main was designed by Malcomson and Higginbotham and built between 1895 and 1896. It originally housed Detroit's Central High School. The original building plan had 103 rooms arranged in a "T" shape with an auditorium that seated over 2,000 people. In 1908, a wing containing gymnasiums, laboratories and shops was added.

The function of the building began to change in 1917, when Detroit Junior College opened its doors in the building. The enrollment in the college grew, crowding the building and the high school still housed there. In 1923, the College of the City of Detroit (CCD) replaced the Detroit Junior College, crowding the building even more. Finally, in 1926, Central High School moved out of the building, leaving CCD as the primary occupant, along with a smaller College High School. In 1928, the latter closed, leaving CCD as the sole tenant. Five years later, Wayne State University was formed, uniting CCD with a College of Pharmacy, the Detroit Medical College, the Detroit Teachers' College, a law school, and a graduate school. A large wing on Warren Avenue was added in 1937. The building continued to serve Wayne State, and in 1994 received major renovations and a new addition.

Old Main was originally a T-shaped structure, but subsequent additions have enlarged the floor plan. The original building has a blue Bedford limestone base with Berea sandstone on the first floor. The upper three and one half stories are made of buff pressed brick. The main facade has a protruding square tower. The main entrance, located at the base of the tower, is through an elaborately carved Romanesque arch. The top of the tower includes a clock on each face.

== See also ==
- University–Cultural Center Multiple Resource Area
