= Museum of Contemporary Art Detroit =

Coordinates: 42.3527°N 83.0607°W

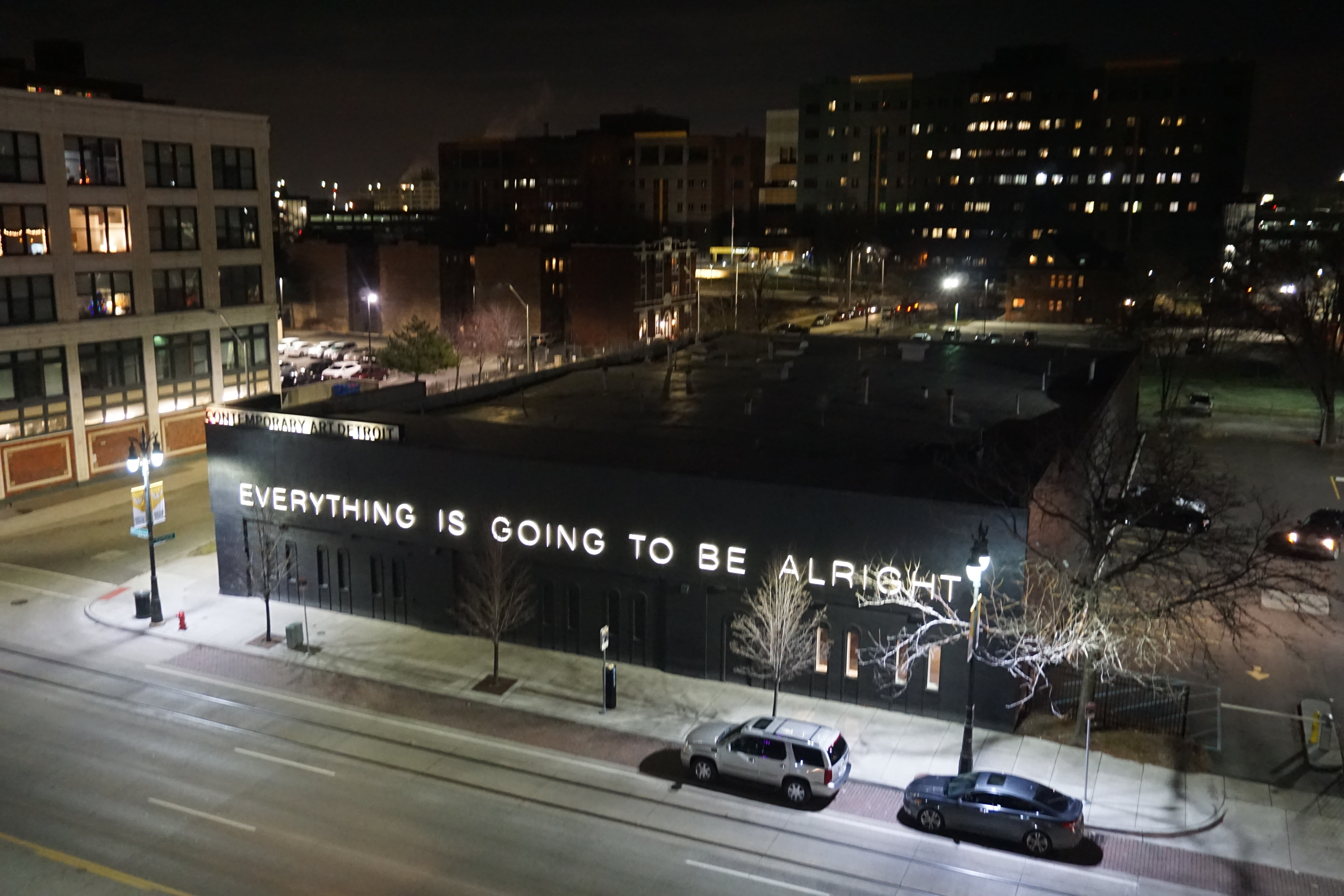

- Location within Wayne County, Michigan
- Established: 2006
- Location: Midtown, Detroit, Michigan, US
- Type: Contemporary art museum
- Public transit access: QLine Canfield; DDOT 4
- Website: mocadetroit.org

The Museum of Contemporary Art Detroit (MOCAD) is a non-collecting contemporary art museum located in the city's Midtown area of Detroit.

MOCAD is housed in a 22,000-square-foot (2,000 m^{2}) building, a converted former auto dealership designed by Albert Kahn. The architecture of the building was left intentionally raw and unfinished.

== History ==
The museum was founded by Julia Reyes Taubman.

=== Exhibitions ===
Its first exhibition, Meditations in an Emergency, started on October 28, 2006. It was curated by Klaus Kertess, and included work by Tabaimo, Kara Walker, Nari Ward, and others. The second exhibition which ran from February to April 2007 was "Shrinking Cities" a largely conceptual exhibition dealing with population loss and shifting urban concentrations all over the world, with Detroit being a main focus of the exhibition. Their third exhibition, which ran until July 2007 was titled "Stuff: The International Collection of Burt Aaron." It was an exhibit of the personal collection of renowned Michigan collector Burt Aaron.

In 2013, the museum exhibited Mike Kelley's "Mobile Homestead".

== Programming history ==
MOCAD has hosted musical, literary and artistic events. Artists and musicians such as Roy Ayers, Amp Fiddler, Dan Deacon's Round Robin, Michael Yonkers, Marlon Magas, Pink Reason, and Roscoe Mitchell; writers like John Giorno and Bill Berkson; and performance artists such as Jody Oberfelder, Will Power and Pat Oleszko have been featured at MOCAD.
