= David D. Mackenzie =

American academic (1860–1926)

David D. Mackenzie (1860–1926) was a Michigan educator and administrator. Mackenzie was born in Detroit on May 28, 1860; he attended Capitol High School and the University of Michigan.

== Biography ==
By 1881, David Mackenzie had earned his teaching credentials and a Master's degree. Throughout much of the 1880s, Mackenzie taught at the elementary and secondary level in Flint, Michigan; by 1888, he had been promoted to the position of Superintendent. During 1892, Mackenzie moved to west Michigan where he served twelve years as Superintendent of Muskegon Schools.

In 1904, David Mackenzie came back to Detroit as the new Principal of Central High School. By 1913, under Mackenzie's direction, a one-year, college-level premedical curriculum was established at Central High - the first junior college curriculum organized in Michigan. In 1916, the program was extended to two-years, and in 1917 the state legislature approved Mackenzie's plans for establishing the Detroit Junior College.

In 1919, David Mackenzie – then Principal of Detroit Central High School and Detroit Junior College – was officially appointed first Dean of the college that he had helped originate. With Mackenzie at the helm, Detroit Junior College became the third largest institution of higher learning in Michigan. The college was granted four-year degree status in 1923, becoming the College of the City of Detroit; David L. Mackenzie continued as Dean until his death in 1926. In 1934, the College was renamed Wayne University; it became officially known as Wayne State University in 1956.

== Memorial ==
In 1928, the Detroit Board of Education dedicated its newest high school to the memory of David Mackenzie. The three-story structure, located at 9275 Wyoming Street, on the city's west side, closed its doors for the last time in June 2007; it was demolished in 2012.

== See also ==
- Mackenzie House
- Mackenzie High School
