= Architects Building =

- U.S. National Register of Historic Places
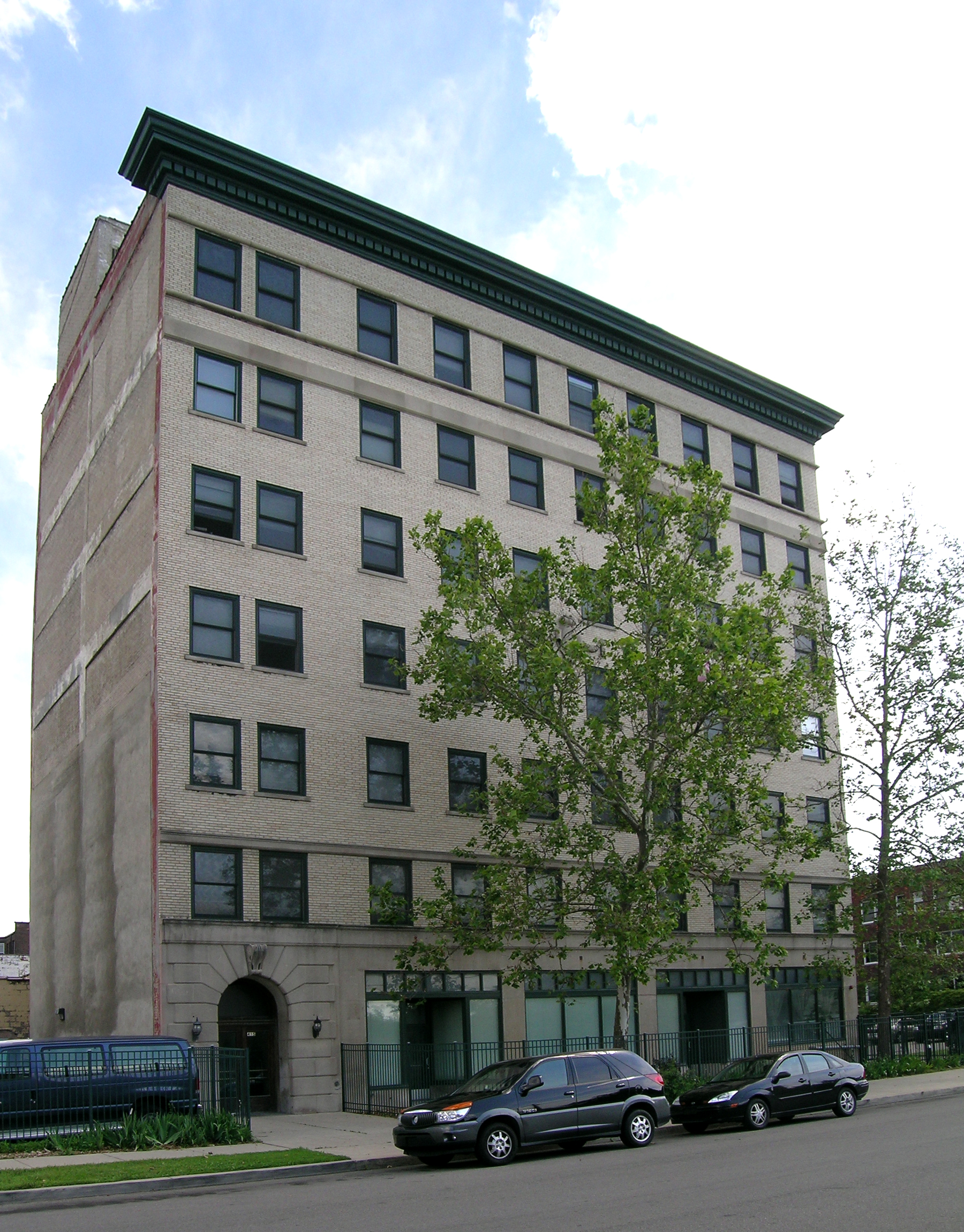
- Interactive map
- Location: 415 Brainard Street; Detroit, Michigan
- Coordinates: 42°20′48″N 83°3′43″W
- Built: 1924
- Architect: Richard H. Marr
- Architectural style: Classical Revival
- NRHP reference No.: 95000531
- Added to NRHP: May 04, 1995

The Architects Building is an office building located at 415 Brainard Street in Midtown Detroit, Michigan. It was listed on the National Register of Historic Places in 1995.

== History ==
The Architects Building is a seven-story building erected in 1924 by Thomas J. Thompson, a man involved with the hotel and restaurant trade. Thompson hired Richard H. Marr, a well-known Detroit architect, to design the building. Its original purpose was to provide space for all architectural professionals and trades in one building. When the Architects Building opened, 25 firms had space in the building, including Marr and architect Marcus R. Burrowes.

However, the Great Depression was hard on the building. In 1933, only three architects remained in the building, and in 1936 Thompson' estate (he had died in 1928) lost the building to foreclosure. After 1940 both Marr and Burrowes moved out, and the building's association with the field of architecture seems to have ended. In 1950, the building was renamed the Contractor's Storage Building, and in 1974, it was purchased by the Salvation Army. In 1985, it was purchased by the Cass Corridor Neighborhood Development Corporation.

== Description and significance ==
The Architects Building is a seven-story Neo-Classical Revival commercial building, built with a reinforced concrete frame, faced with buff brick, and trimmed in stone. It is the tallest building in the immediate vicinity, and despite the sweeping changes elsewhere in the neighborhood, the exterior is in good condition. The first floor lobby, the most significant area within the building, is still in good condition and looks much as it was designed.

== Current use ==
In 1999, the CCNDC renovated the building and turned it into 27 apartments for low-income residents.
