= Girls Catholic Central High School =

Girls' Catholic Central High School
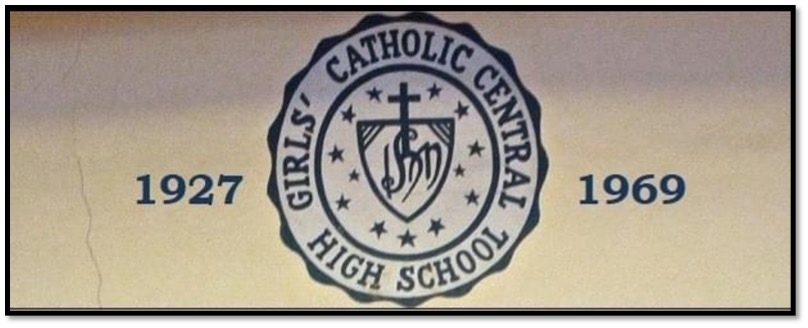

Location
- 58 Parsons Street; Detroit, Michigan; United States

Information
- Other name: GCC
- Type: Private non-boarding Catholic high school
- Established: 1893
- Founder: Sisters, Servants of the Immaculate Heart of Mary
- Closed: 1969
- Chaplain: Priests of CICM Order
- Faculty: 14 (12 IHM Sisters, 2 lay teachers)
- Grades: 9-12
- Gender: Female
- Enrollment: 320
- Colors: Navy blue and White
- Accreditation: North Central Association
- Newspaper: The Centribune
- Yearbook: The Centravue

Girls' Catholic Central High School (GCC) was a private, non-boarding college preparatory secondary school for girls grades 9 through 12 located in midtown Detroit, Michigan.

== History ==
In September 1893, four IHM Sisters (Sisters, Servants of the Immaculate Heart of Mary) opened a school called St. Patrick's, at Cathedral parish in Detroit. After several years as St. Patrick's Grade School and Saints Peter and Paul Academy, the building was renamed Catholic Central High School for Girls and converted to a high school curriculum in the school year 1927-28. The first graduate was recorded on June 22, 1899.

Thereafter, the school, under its new name, Girls’ Catholic Central High School, and under the auspices of the Archdiocese of Detroit, was administered by the IHM Sisters, Priests of the CICM order. It was accredited by the North Central Association Commission on Accreditation. The tuition-based academic program required entrance exams and maintained selective admission standards for prospective students.

Many students traveled from considerable distances, not only from Detroit, Hamtramck and Highland Park but also suburbs including Ferndale, Grosse Pointe, and Livonia. Although the student body was predominantly white for many years, the social changes of the late 1950s and early 1960s began to bring about the enrollment of a small number of students of color.

Located on a side street in mid-town Detroit, the three-story school building is built in the Gothic Revival style. The school is located near the Orchestra Hall building where the Detroit Symphony Orchestra rehearses. Music from the Orchestra Hall can be heard during afternoon classes.

== Academics ==
The college preparatory curriculum offered the required and elective courses at each grade level in Religion, English, Mathematics, Science, Social Studies, Foreign Language (Latin I, II, III), Business (Typing, Shorthand), and Physical Education.

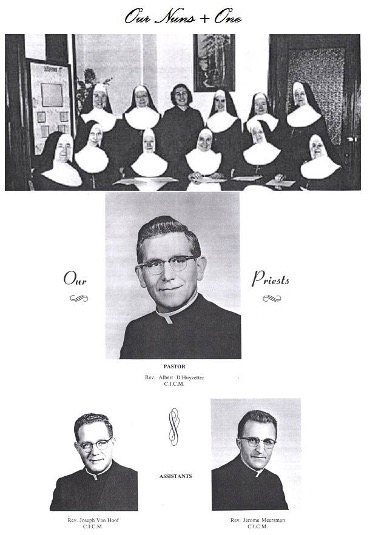
Faculty

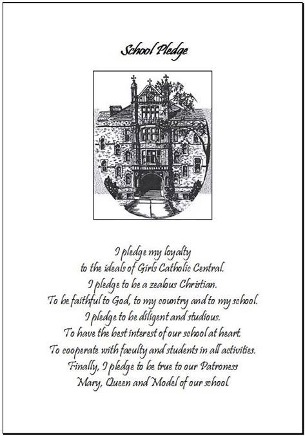
Pledge

== Religion ==
St. Thérèse the Little Flower, and Patroness The Virgin Mary were inspiration of Christian life in the Roman Catholic tradition. In addition to IHM Sisters faculty members, Diocesan priests of the CICM order also held regular religion classes. The academic program was accompanied by mandatory strict adherence to deeply religious values and devotion to the Catholic faith and Church rituals. Prior to the beginning of classes each morning, Mass was attended at the Chapel of St. Theresa-the Little Flower, which was adjacent to the school building, and the Sacrament of Confession was offered weekly.

== 1969 to 2025 ==
Girls’ Catholic Central High School held its final graduation ceremony and closed its doors for the last time in 1969. In 1973, Sister Mary Watson, O.P. (1934–2021) of the Racine Dominican order repurposed the vacant school building to begin what later became the St. Patrick Senior Center, a community-based meal and support program for seniors affiliated with St. Patrick’s Church. So, she initiated a free meal program for senior parishioners of St. Patrick's Church, which is located next door. And with the support and blessing of the Church's pastor, Rev. Thomas J. Duffey, (1924-2007), Sister Mary worked, raising funds and seeking out grants in order to grow her ministry. Soon, as word spread around the Cass Corridor community, the need for the services being offered was confirmed. Today, approaching 50 years of service to Detroit seniors, St. Patrick Senior Center has grown and expanded tremendously, and under the leadership of executive director SaTrice Coleman-Betts, offers a host of senior services for people over the age of 55.

== Notable alumna ==
- Toi Derricotte (1958) — poet, memoirist
