= Willis–Selden Historic District =

Historic district in Michigan, United States

- U.S. National Register of Historic Places
- U.S. Historic district
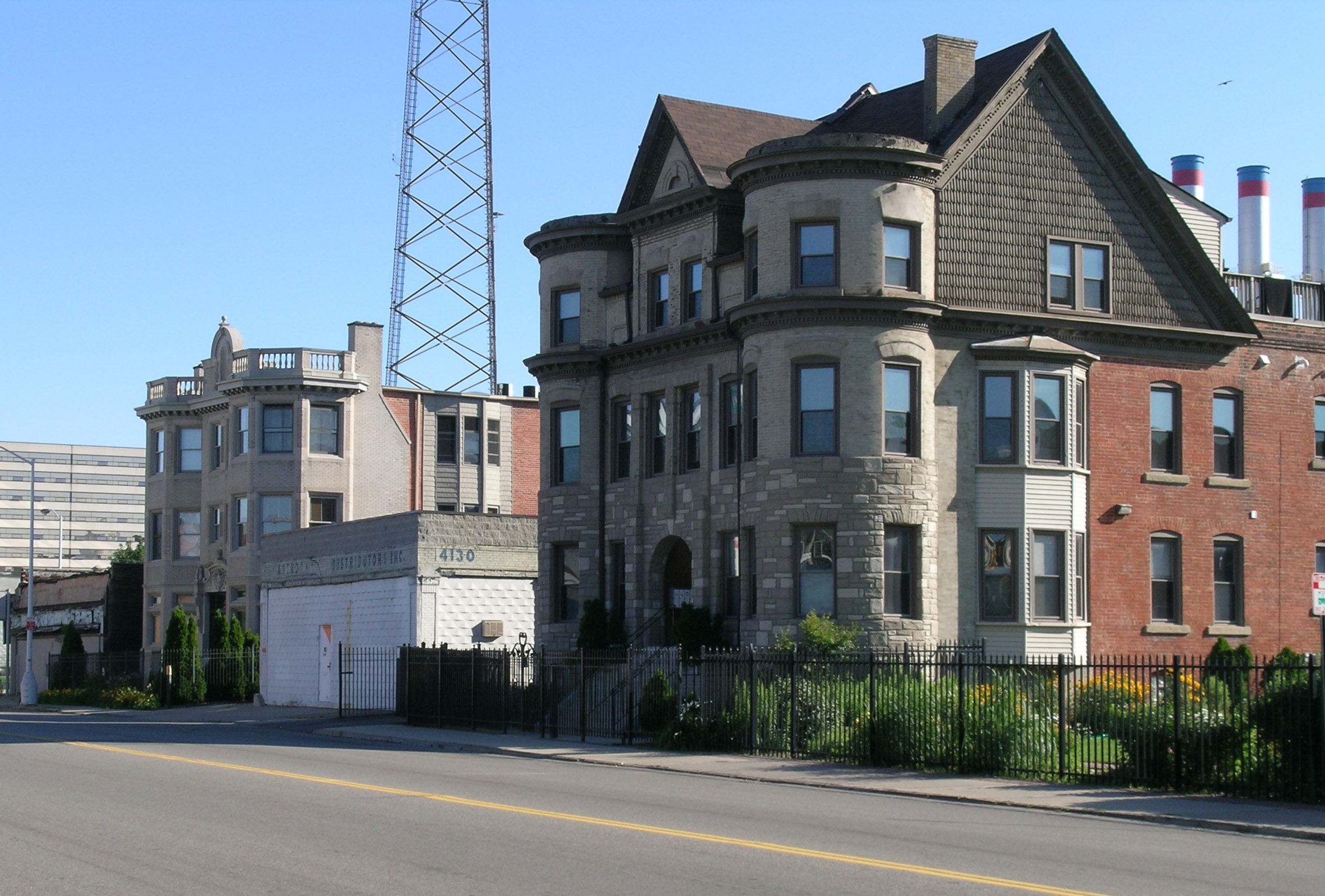
- Cass Avenue, north of Alexandrine
- Interactive map
- Location: Detroit, Michigan, U.S.
- Coordinates: 42°20′57″N 83°3′52″W
- Built: 1870
- Architect: multiple
- Architectural style: Colonial Revival, Beaux Arts, Early Commercial
- MPS: Cass Farm MPS
- NRHP reference No.: 97001478
- Added to NRHP: December 01, 1997

The Willis–Selden Historic District is a historic district located in Detroit, Michigan, consisting of three streets: Willis, Alexandrine, and Selden, Running from Woodward Avenue on the east to Third Avenue on the west. The district was listed on the National Register of Historic Places in 1997.

== History ==
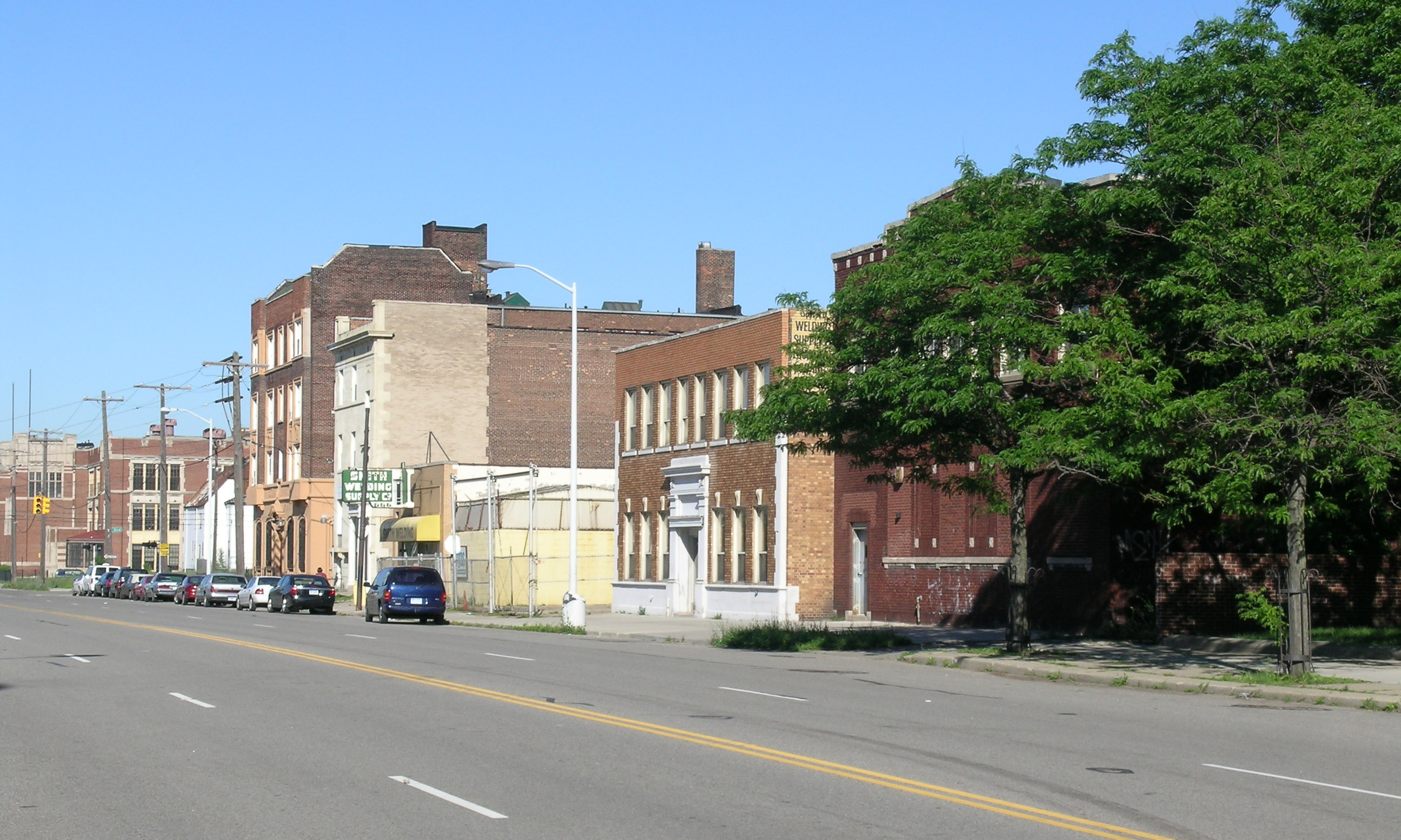
Selden Street between Second and Third. Taken from in front of the Coronado Apartments.

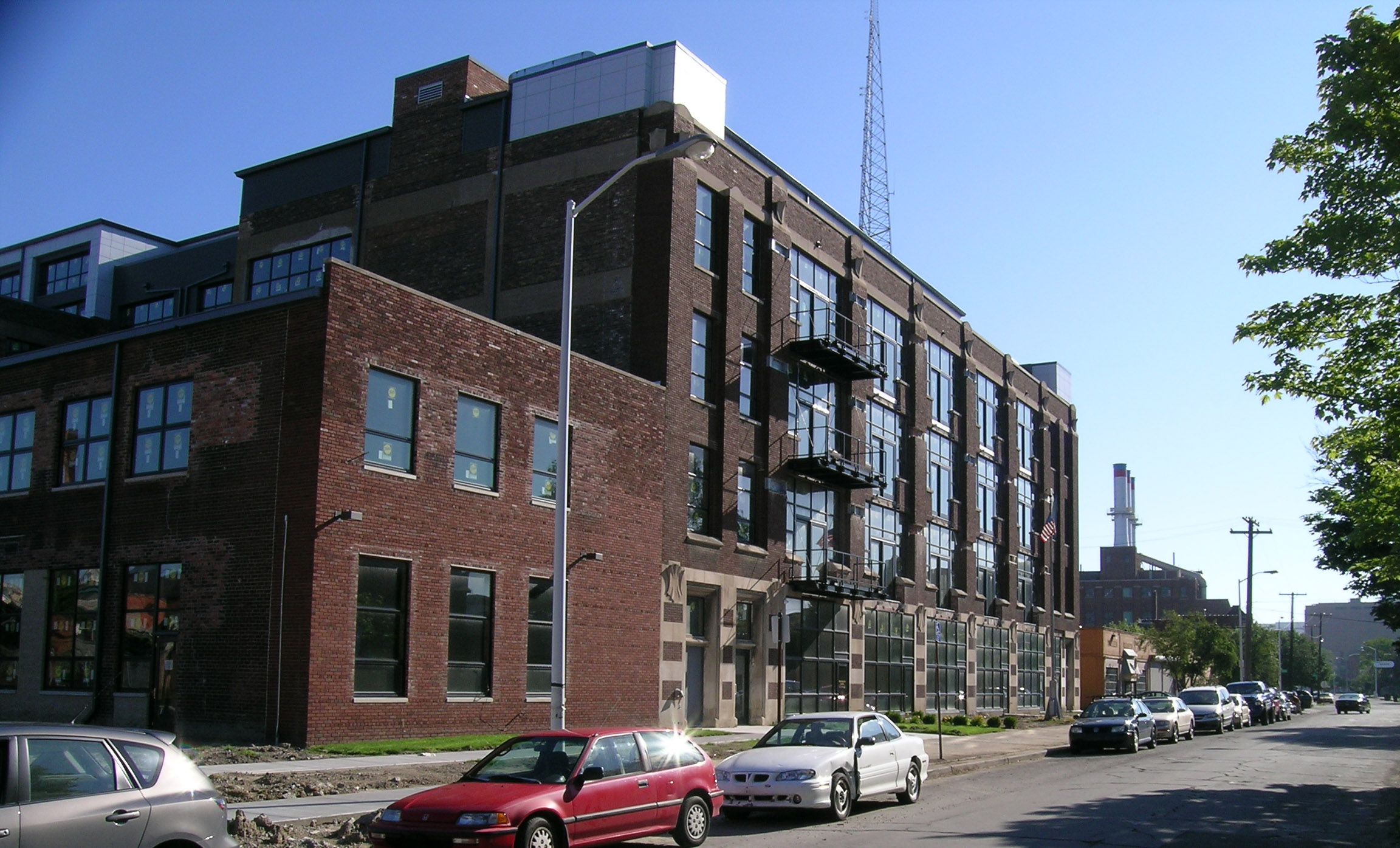
Willis Overland Lofts, on Willis looking east.

The land forming the Willis–Selden Historic District was originally the Park Lots, the Cass Farm, and the Jones/Crane Farm. These parcels were subdivided in the late 1800s. Due in part to the growth of Detroit during the 1860s and generous lot sizes, the Willis–Selden District became a popular area for development, particularly for the relatively wealthy professional class.

In the early twentieth century, the district became home to auto industry suppliers, once again due to its location and large lots. Forty-one percent of commercial buildings in the district built between 1910 and 1930 were auto-related. In addition, large, high-density apartments were constructed to meet the demands of the huge influx of auto workers into Detroit. However, the Great Depression had a marked impact on the industry and on the Willis–Selden Historic District, sending it into decline.

== Buildings ==
Of the buildings located within the district, a number a historically significant in their own right. These include:

- Detroit-Columbia Central Office Building (52 Selden)
- Cass Avenue Methodist Episcopal Church (3901 Cass Avenue, at Selden)
- Coronado Apartments (3751-73 Second Avenue, at Selden)
- Stuber-Stone Building (4221-4229 Cass Avenue, at Willis)
- Detroit Edison Company Willis Avenue Station (50 W. Willis)
