= Detroit–Columbia Central Office Building =

- U.S. National Register of Historic Places
- U.S. Historic district – Contributing property
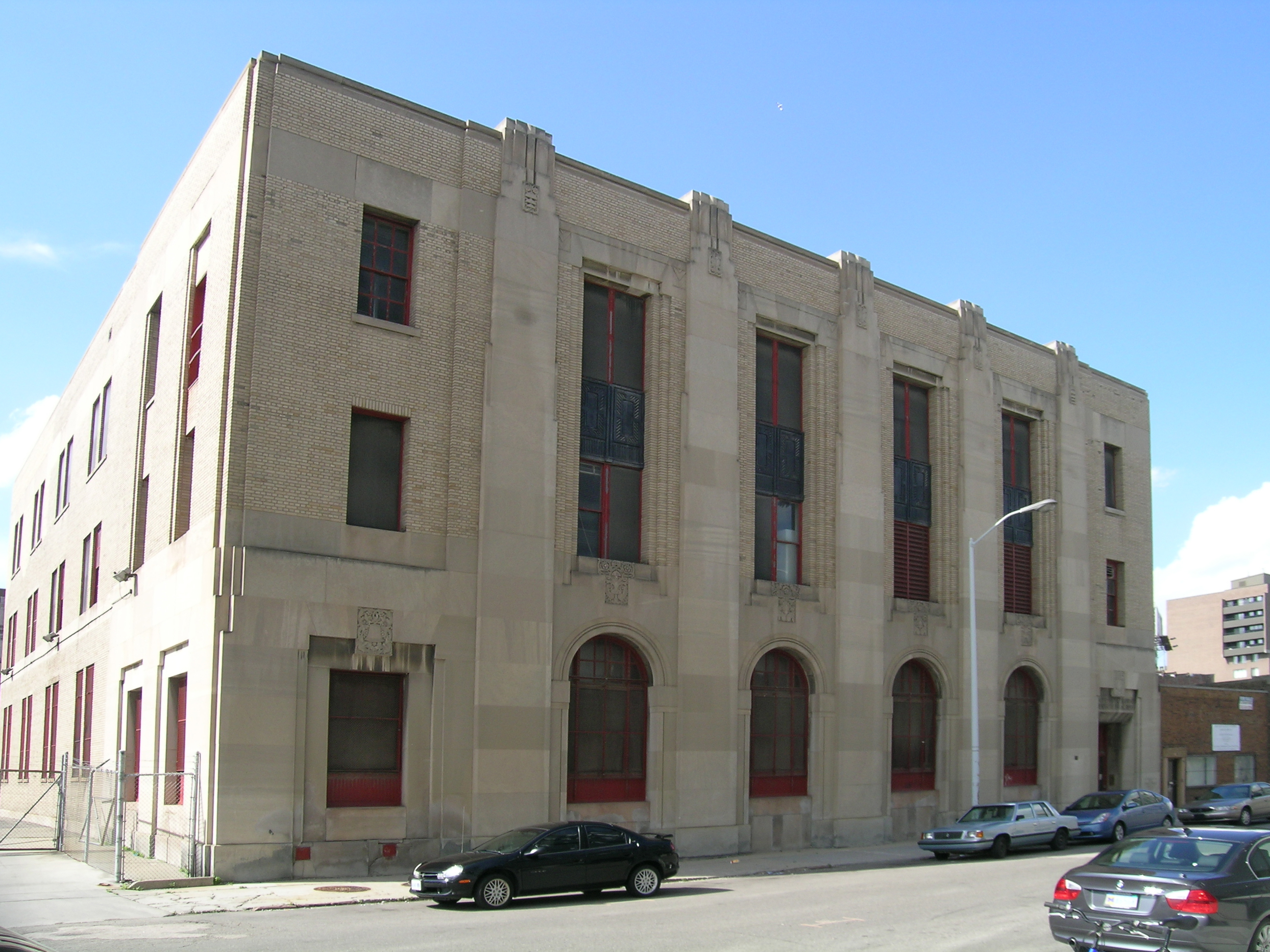
- Interactive map
- Location: 52 Selden Street; Detroit, Michigan
- Coordinates: 42°20′57.34″N 83°3′38.28″W
- Built: 1927
- Architect: Smith, Hinchman, & Grylls
- Architectural style: Modern Movement, Art Deco
- Part of: Willis-Selden Historic District (ID97001478)
- MPS: Cass Farm MPS
- NRHP reference No.: 97001098

Significant dates
- Added to NRHP: September 22, 1997
- Designated CP: December 01, 1997

The Detroit–Columbia Central Office Building is a building located at 52 Selden Street in Midtown Detroit, Michigan. It is also known as the Michigan Bell Telephone Exchange. The building was listed on the National Register of Historic Places in 1997.

== History ==
The Detroit–Columbia Central Office Building was commissioned by the Michigan Bell Telephone Company in 1927 at a cost of $1.2 million. The building was designed by Smith, Hinchman, & Grylls, and construction was completed in November 1928. The "dial system" office building, built to relieve the function of earlier "manual" exchanges, originally served around 7000 telephone customers in the central Woodward Avenue district of the city. The building is still owned by AT&T, a successor company of Michigan Bell.

== Description ==
The Detroit–Columbia Central Office Building is a rectangular three-story Art Deco building constructed of steel and reinforced concrete and faced with brick and limestone. The building measures 105 feet wide by 116 feet deep by 64 feet tall. The first floor is faced with limestone; the limestone continues upward in the shape of five pilasters dividing the facade into six bays. The upper floors between the pilasters are faced with light brown brick.

The entrance is located in the eastern bay, and is topped with a carved panel. An identical panel also tops a slight recess located in the western bay to match the entryway. The other four bays contain semi-round arched openings with subdivided windows on the ground floor. Two-story rectangular openings above contain one group of windows on each floor.

On the interior, the basement contains a cable vault, a battery room and the heating plant. The first and second floors contain the switching equipment, and the third floor contains operating rooms.

== See also ==
- AT&T Michigan Headquarters
