= West Canfield Historic District =

Historic district in Michigan, United States

- U.S. National Register of Historic Places
- U.S. Historic district
- Michigan State Historic Site
- House on West Canfield in 2025
- Interactive map
- Location: Detroit, Michigan, U.S.
- Coordinates: 42°21′3″N 83°4′4″W
- Built: 1871
- Architectural style: Queen Anne
- MPS: Cass Farm MPS (boundary increase only)
- NRHP reference No.: 71000433 (original); 97001092 (increase)

Significant dates
- Added to NRHP: May 27, 1971
- Boundary increase: September 22, 1997
- Designated MSHS: November 6, 1970

The West Canfield Historic District is a neighborhood historic district located primarily on Canfield Avenue between Second and Third Streets in Detroit, Michigan. A boundary increase enlarged the district to include buildings on Third Avenue between Canfield and Calumet. The district was designated a Michigan State Historic Site in 1970 and listed on the National Register of Historic Places in 1971; a boundary increase was added in 1997. The revitalized 1870s era neighborhood is one of the residential areas surrounding the city's Cultural Center Historic District in Midtown. Nearby, East Canfield Avenue leads to the Detroit Medical Center complex, the Romanesque Revival styled St. Josaphat's Catholic Church, and the Gothic revival styled Sweetest Heart of Mary Catholic Church.

== History ==
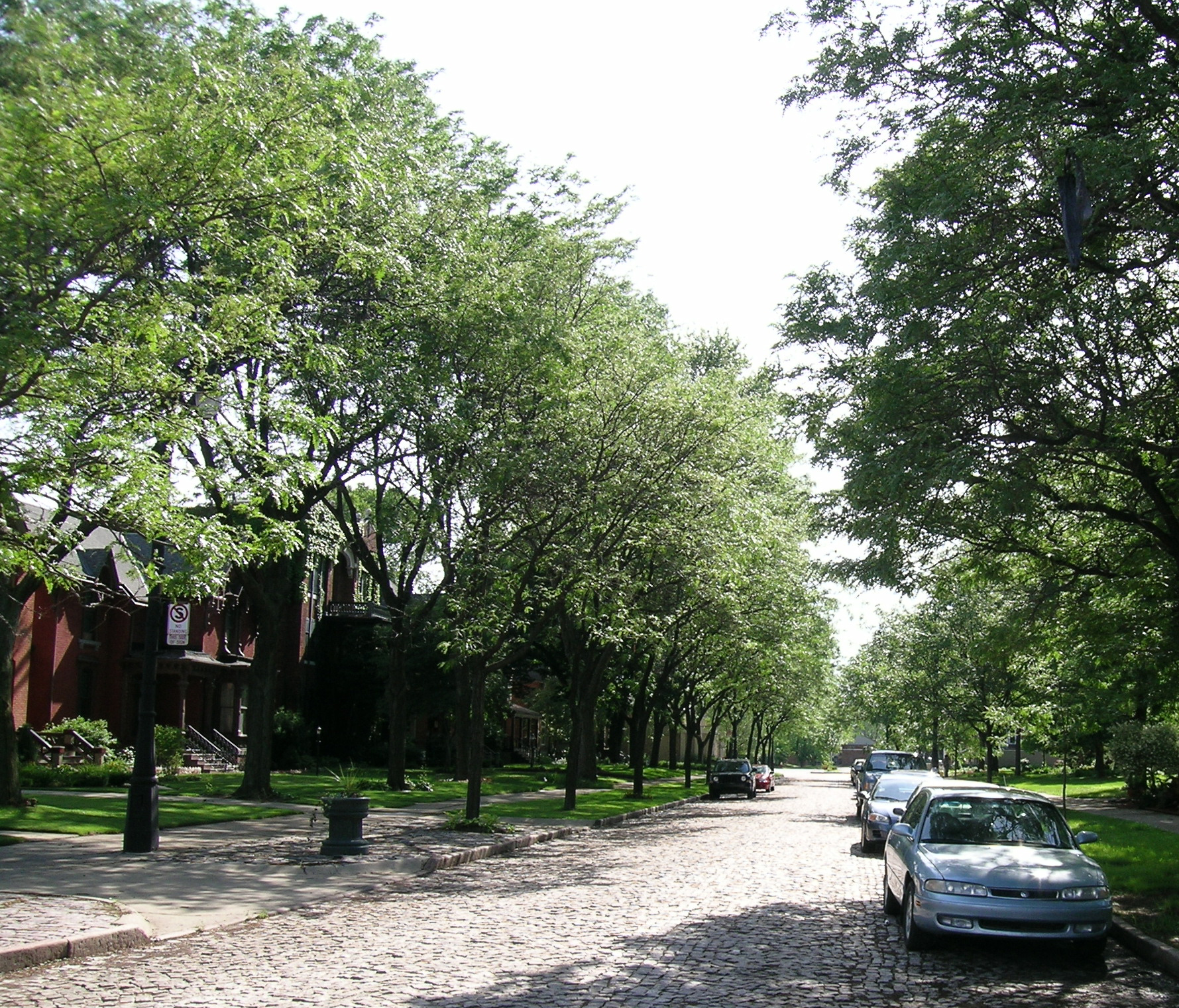
West Canfield streetscape

The area around the West Canfield Historic District was once owned by Lewis Cass, an early governor of Michigan. When he died in 1866, his two daughters inherited his holdings. Three years later, they divided the property, with Cass's daughter Mary receiving the portion where the West Canfield Historic District is now located. Mary's husband was Captain August Canfield, a graduate of West Point and a major investor in the construction of the ship canal at Sault Ste. Marie. In 1871, Mary Cass Canfield subdivided her land, naming Canfield Avenue in honor of her husband.

The street was populated by prosperous attorneys, physicians, dentists, architects, and other professionals. Construction continued into the 1880s. The street remained a prime residential location in Detroit for decades. In the 1930s, the Great Depression led to a decline in the neighborhood. In the 1960s, the neighborhood was revitalized and the historic streetscape was restored. New residents have continued to maintain and revitalize the vibrant Midtown neighborhood in the 21st century.

== Architecture ==
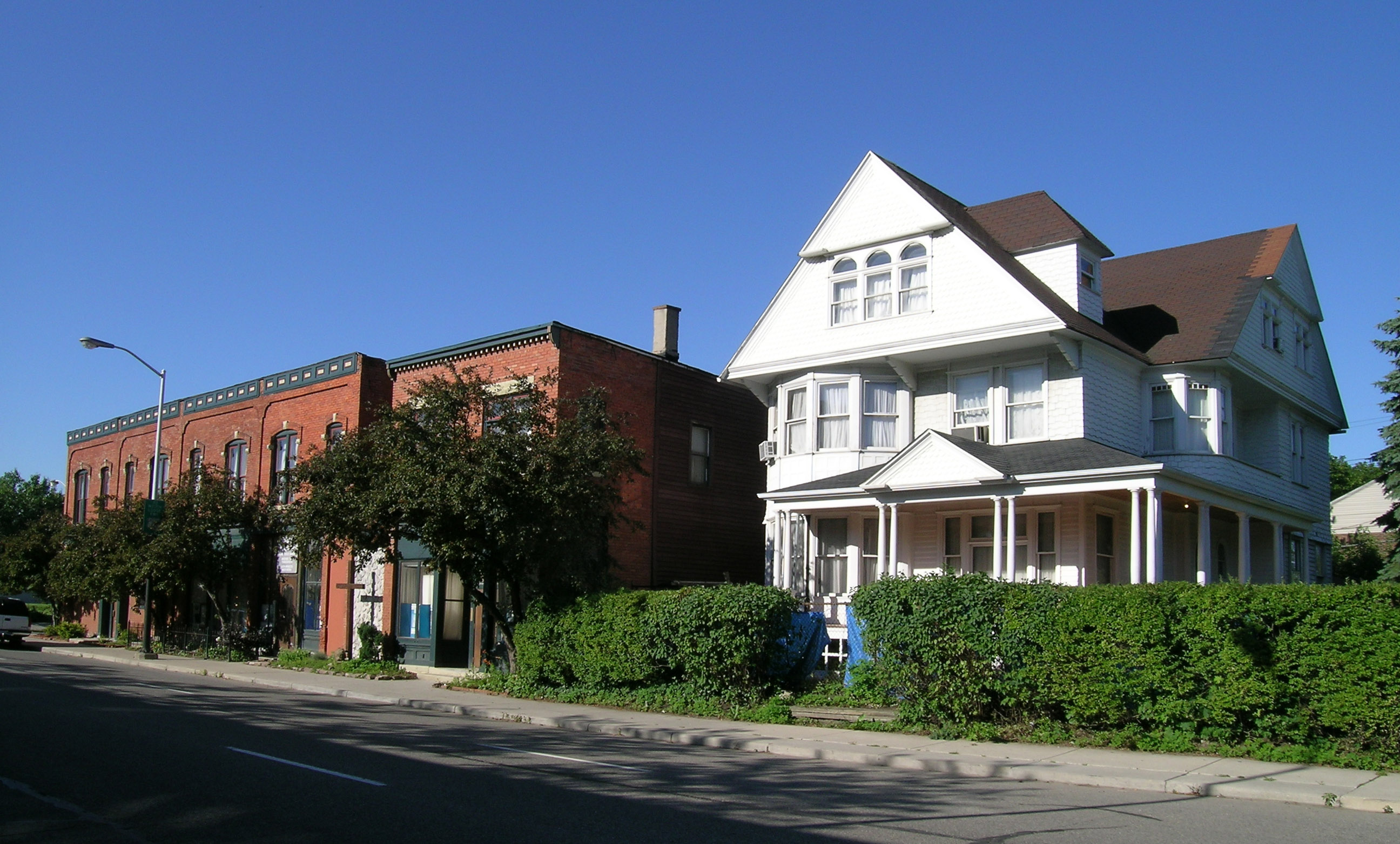
Buildings included in the boundary increase of West Canfield Historic District

In the early 1870s, numerous brick Queen Anne homes were constructed along Canfield, on spacious lots with generous setbacks. The original platting specified that each lot would measure 50 by 190 feet, and that there would be "a 30 foot setback for sidewalk, shrubbery, and ornamental purposes."

In the early 1980s, the street was narrowed and returned to its original 1870s design with granite pavers, reproduction street lamps were installed, trees were planted, and grassy medians were added. In 1970, the District received state and local historical designation, the first district so recognized in the city. The district was placed on the National Register of Historic Places the following year. In 1997, District was expanded to include three buildings on Third Street: one additional Queen Anne style residence and two Victorian commercial buildings. In the new millennium, the vibrant neighborhood has experienced many renovations.

== Gallery ==
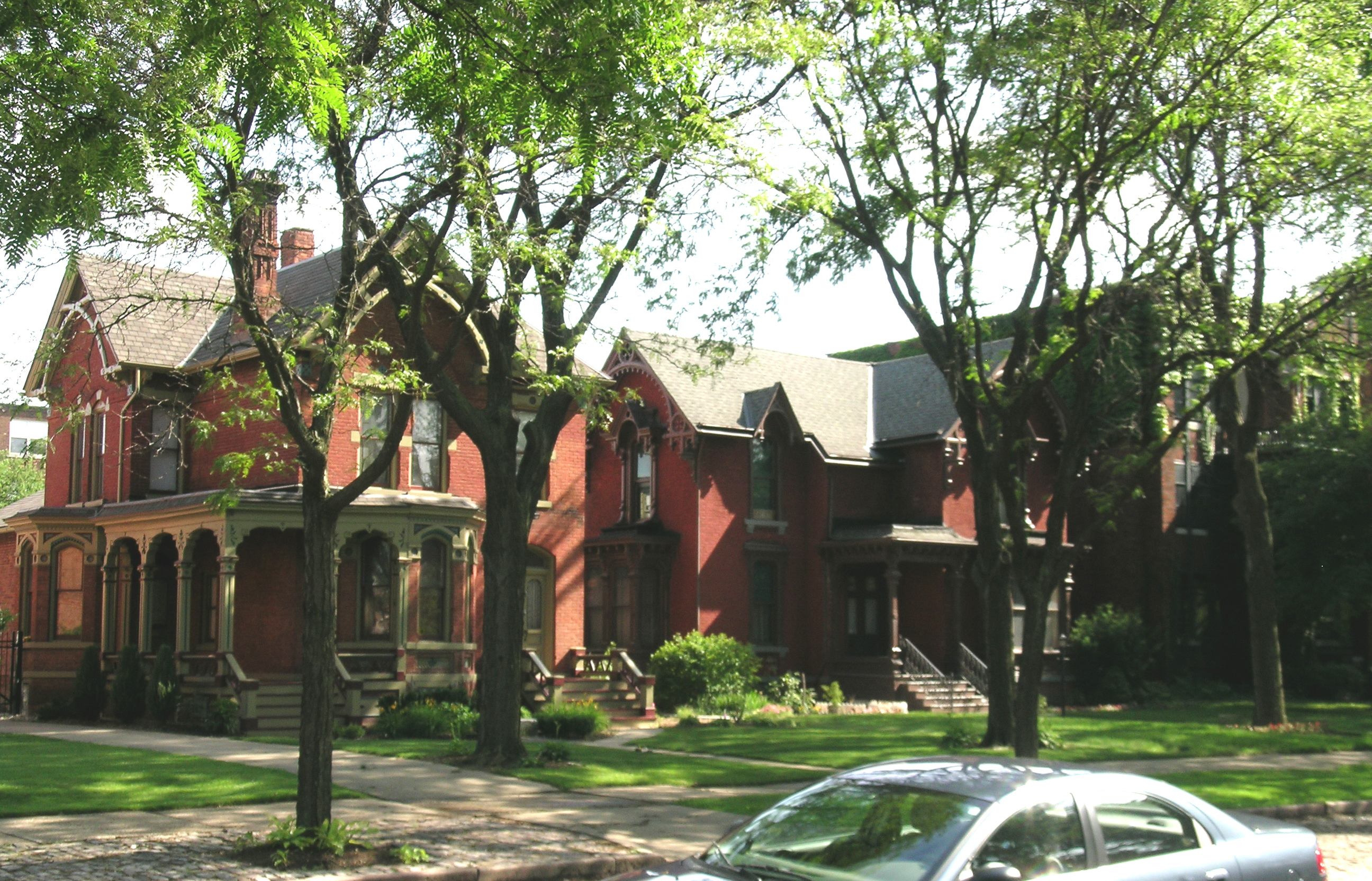
Houses on West Canfield

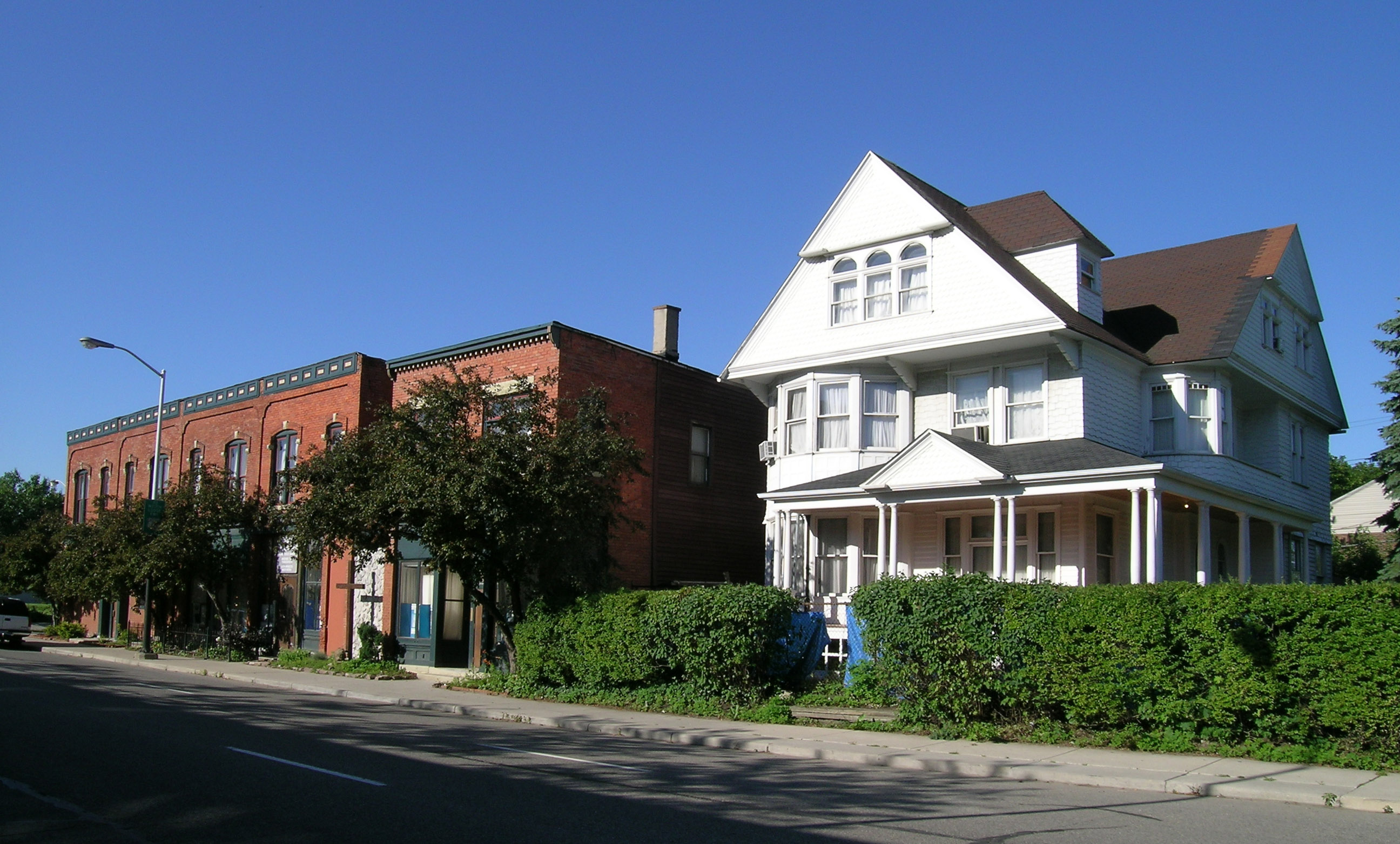
Buildings included in the boundary increase of West Canfield Historic District

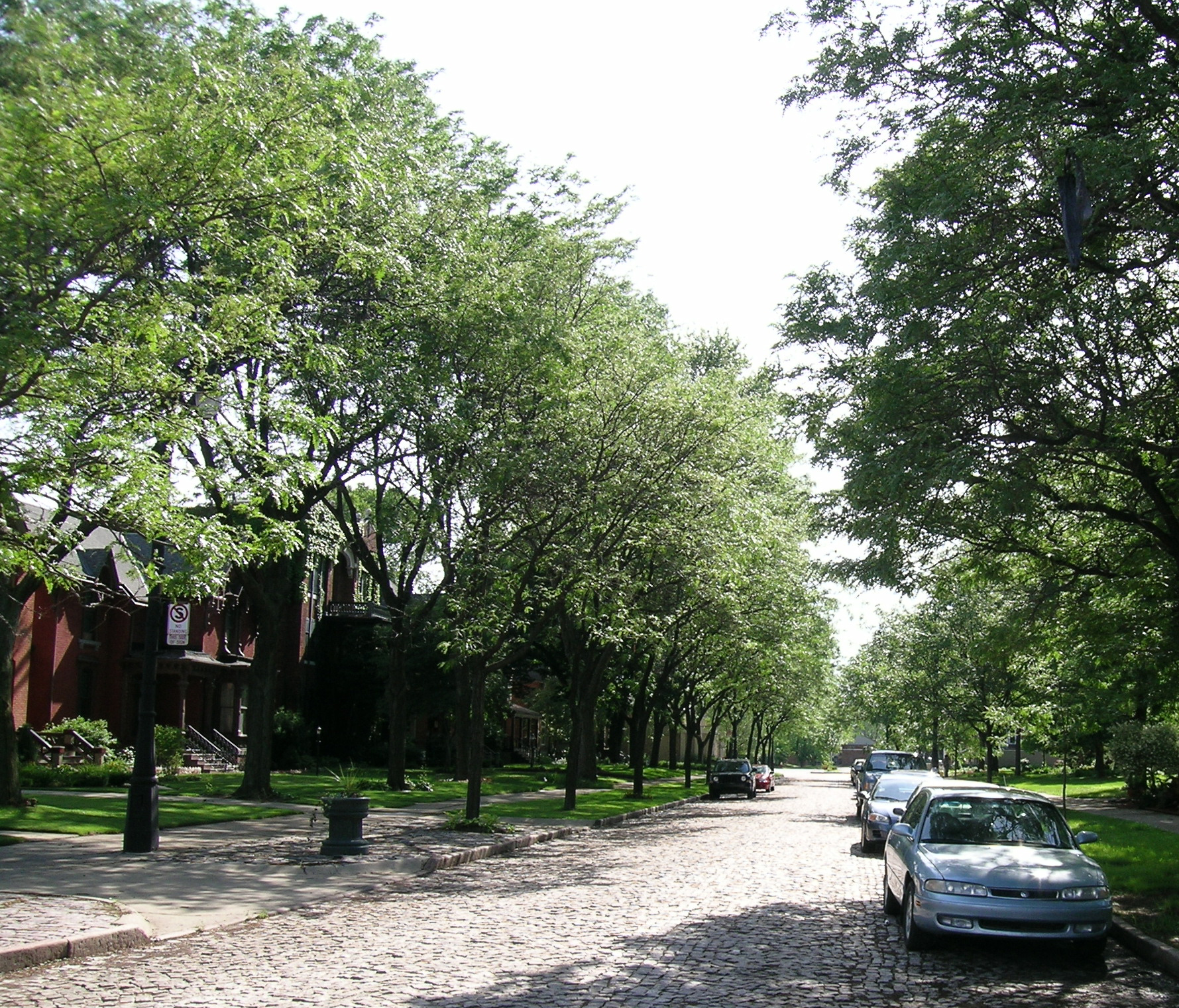
West Canfield streetscape

House on West Canfield

House on West Canfield

House on West Canfield

Houses on West Canfield

House on West Canfield
