= Robert M. and Matilda (Kitch) Grindley House =

Historic house in Michigan, United States

- U.S. National Register of Historic Places
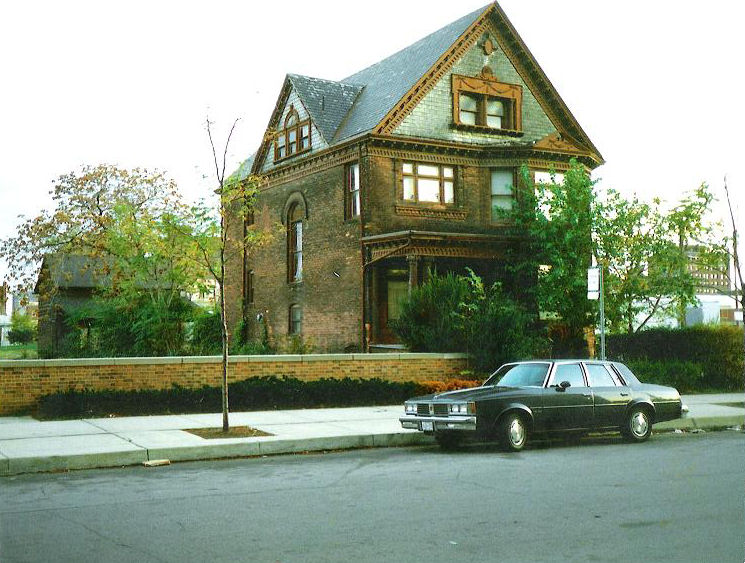
- 123 Parsons before it was demolished
- Interactive map
- Location: 123 Parsons Street; Detroit, Michigan
- Coordinates: 42°20′51″N 83°3′39″W
- Architect: Putnam and Moore
- Architectural style: Colonial Revival
- Demolished: 1998
- MPS: Cass Farm MPS
- NRHP reference No.: 97001475
- Added to NRHP: December 01, 1997

The Robert M. and Matilda (Kitch) Grindley House was a private residence located at 123 Parsons Street in Detroit, Michigan. It was listed on the National Register of Historic Places in 1997, but was subsequently demolished.

== Significance ==
The Robert and Matilda Kitch Grindley House was constructed in 1897 as a single-family dwelling for the Grindley family. The house is significant because of its association with the Grindley family. Three of the Grindleys (Robert McBride, Sarah, and Joseph) made significant contributions to the surrounding community, including participating in various churches and in the social development of local youth.

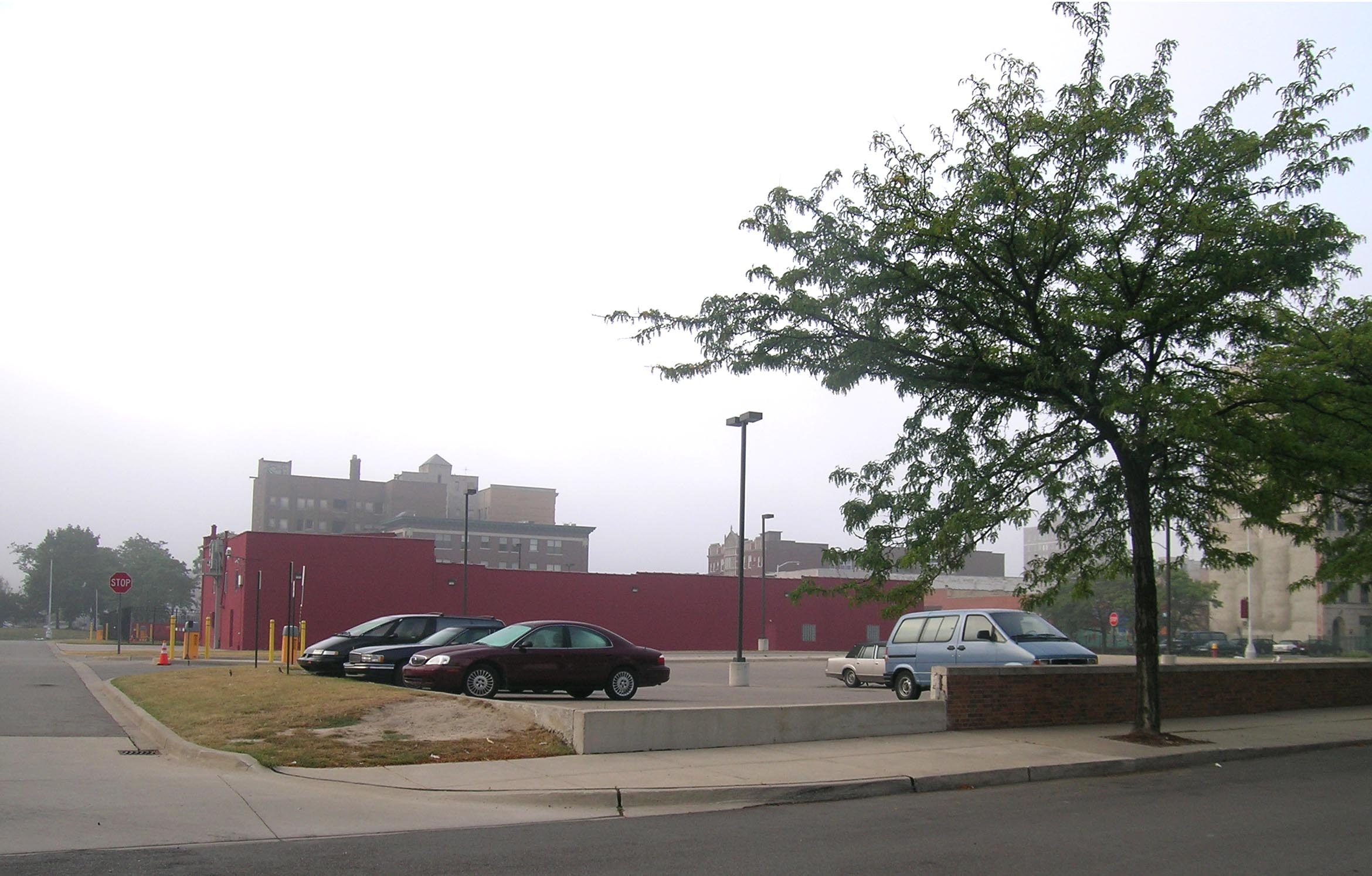
Parking lot where this building once stood, photographed in 2008

Robert McBride Grindley married Matilda Kitch in 1891. Robert was president of City & Suburban Homes Company, Ltd., and was involved in much of the subdivision of what is now Detroit's western and northwestern sections. The company helped manufacturers locate plant sites, found temporary and permanent homes for their workers, and pioneered and an easy payment plan, enabling hundreds of people to buy their own homes. Robert was also a key influence in the establishment of the Boys Club of Detroit and was a Charter Member of the Detroit Board of Commerce. He died in 1946.

Sarah A. Grindley opened several Sunday schools and a camp, and was godmother to many children whose fathers were factory workers. She died in 1945. Joseph Grindley was known as a philanthropist; he founded a camp for under-privileged children and worked with a number of children's clubs. When Joseph died in 1961, the Grindley home was sold out of the family to Harold and Marie Corbett, which they left to their daughter Charlene Corbett in 1986, and was later sold to The Detroit Symphony Orchestra Hall, in 1997. The Detroit Symphony Orchestra Hall decided to demolish the home to make room for a parking structure in 1998.

== Description ==
The house was a 2 1/2-story brick building, built in a Colonial Revival style with Classical detailing. The large gable on the front façade was covered in slate, and embellished with console brackets, scalloped trim, a carved oculus encircled by a frame and voussoirs, and a large two-part lattice window. The window was originally contained in an ornate surround, with a sill supported by modillions, colonettes, and a lintel with carved swags topped with a shell motif. Side dormers with a central lunette, also faced with slate, crossed the slate roof.
