= League of Catholic Women Building =

- U.S. National Register of Historic Places
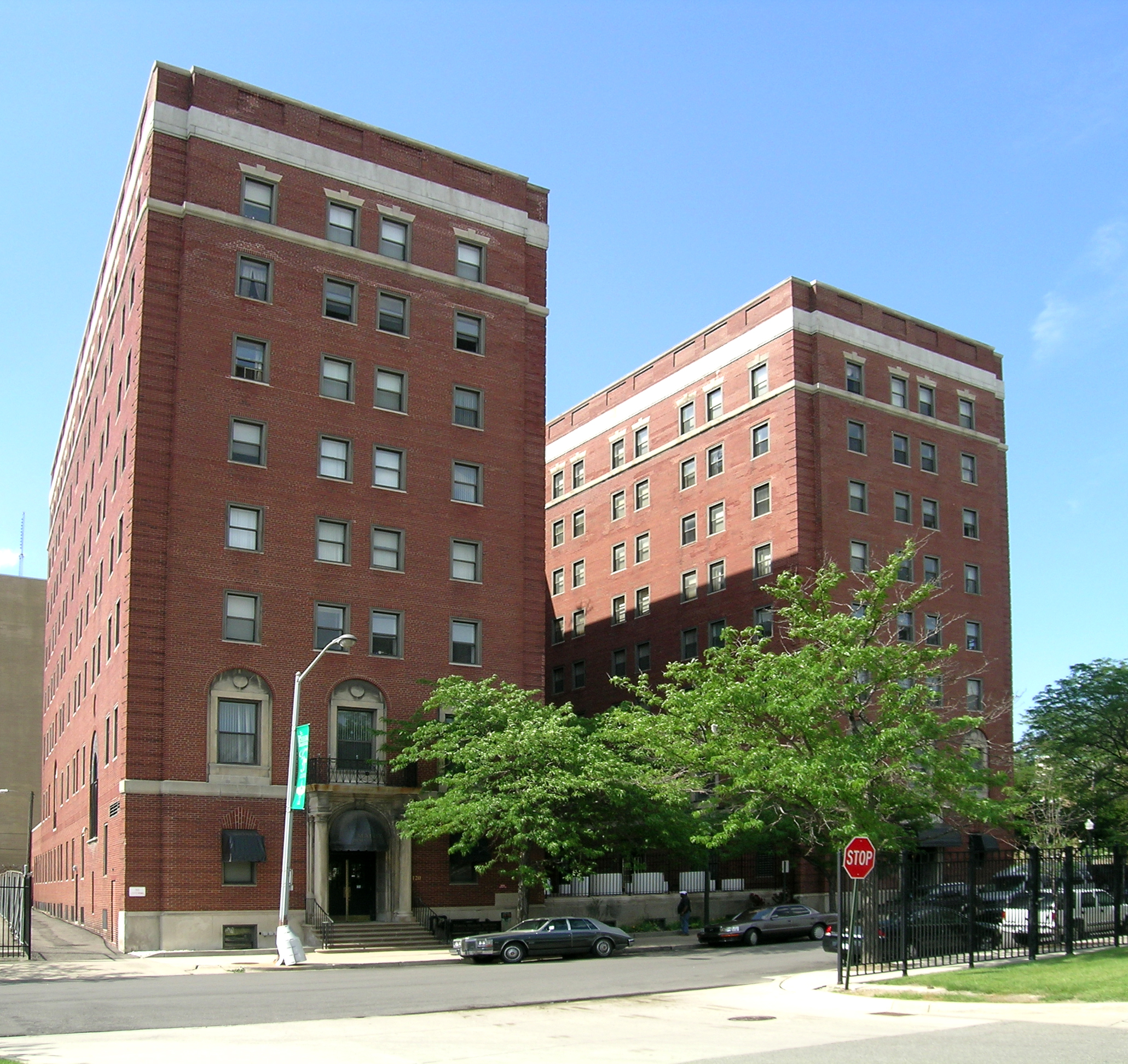
- Interactive map
- Location: 100 Parsons Street; Detroit, Michigan
- Coordinates: 42°20′52″N 83°3′41″W
- Built: 1927
- Architect: Smith, Hinchman & Grylls
- Architectural style: Late 19th And 20th Century Revivals, Colonial Revival
- MPS: Cass Farm MPS
- NRHP reference No.: 97001093
- Added to NRHP: September 22, 1997

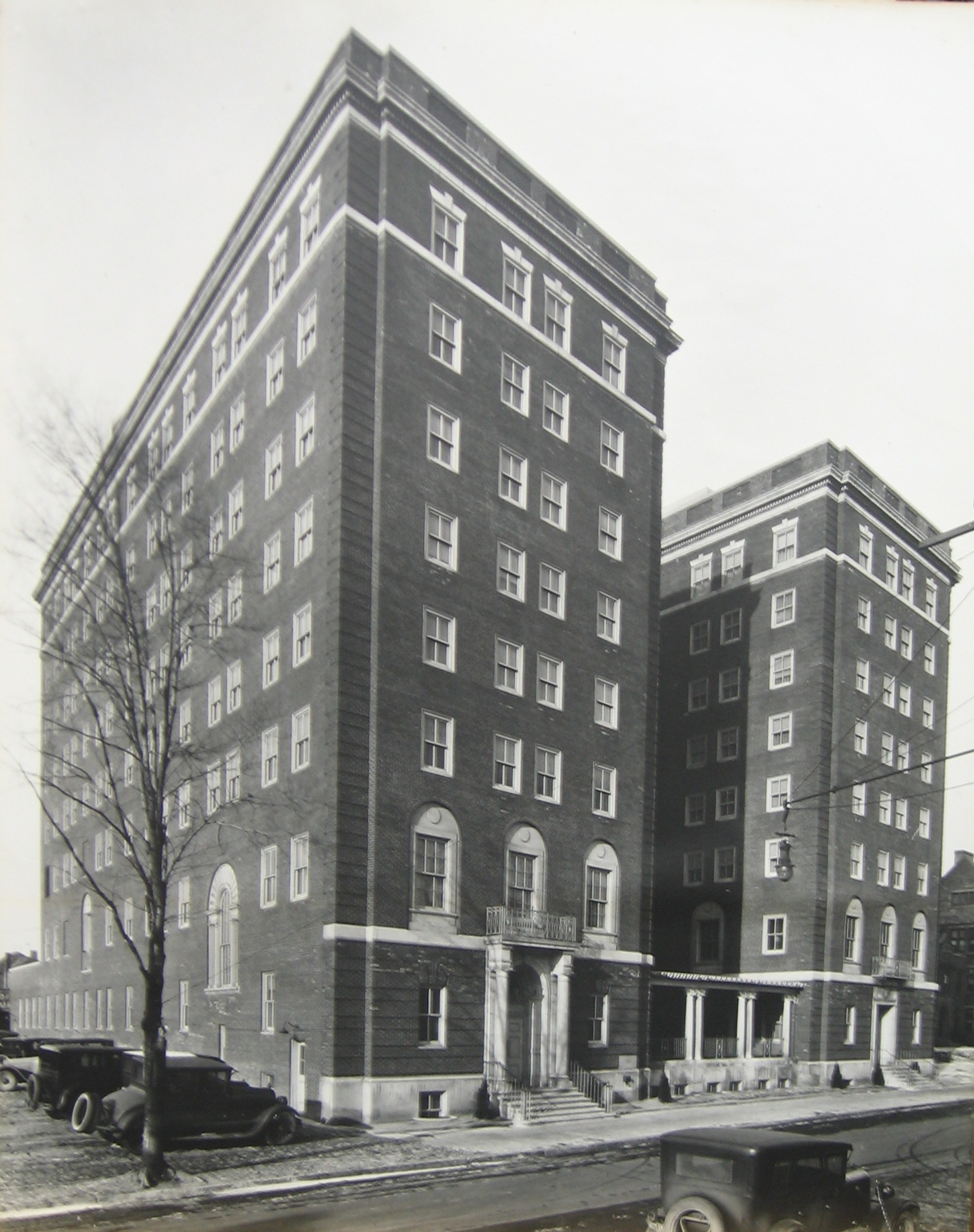
League of Catholic Women Casgrain Hall 1927

The League of Catholic Women Building is located at 100 Parsons Street in Midtown Detroit, Michigan. It is also known as Casgrain Hall or the Activities Building. The building was listed on the National Register of Historic Places in 1997.

== History ==
In 1906, a group of women from all over Detroit associated with the Catholic Church organized the Weinman Club as a charitable organization, dedicated to providing assistance to immigrants flooding into Detroit. In 1911, the club was renamed the Catholic Settlement Association, and in 1915 it was reorganized and again renamed the League of Catholic Women. As immigration was curtailed in the 1920s, the League shifted focus to assisting single young women who were seeking employment in the city.

== Building ==
When this building was constructed, the League spent over $1,000,000, raised by a membership numbering some 12,000 women. The League named the building Casgrain Hall in honor of the League's founder, Anastasia Casgrain.

The building originally provided accommodations for 250 women. These women were between the ages of 18 and 30 and earned less than $150 per month. The building also housed the League's offices, and included a cafeteria, a chapel, library, ballroom, auditorium and a rooftop garden.

== Later use ==
Over time, the aims of the League changed, as they opened community centers and neighborhood services. In the 1960s, the League began providing housing to women attending Wayne State University's School of Nursing. In 1972, the League repaired and improved the building. In 1982, the building was converted into 82 apartment units for low-income elderly and/or handicapped with Section 8 rent subsidies.

In 1994, the organization officially changed its name from the League of Catholic Women to Metro Matrix Human Services. The League of Catholic Women continued as a division of Metro Matrix, and in the early 2000's changed its name to Matrix Human Services. Matrix continues to operate as one of the largest and best known non-profits serving the City of Detroit. Matrix stopped operating from this building in 2018. http://www.matrixhumanservices.org
