= Cass–Davenport Historic District =

Historic district in Michigan, United States

- U.S. National Register of Historic Places
- U.S. Historic district
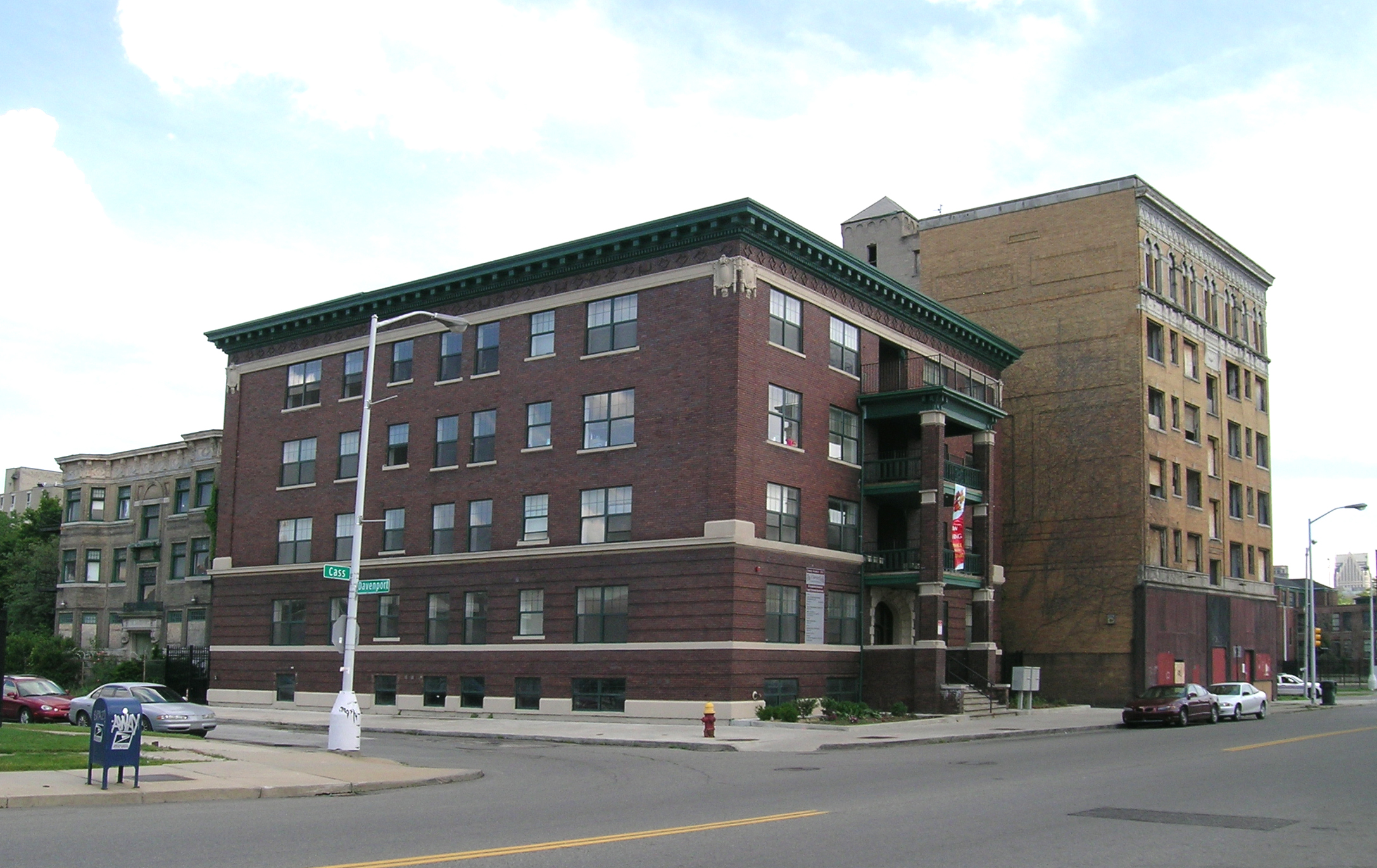
- Davenport, Chesterfield, and Naomi Apartments
- Interactive map
- Location: Detroit, Michigan, U.S.
- Coordinates: 42°20′46″N 83°3′40″W
- Built: 1905
- Architect: Baxter & O'Dell; Putnam & Moore
- Architectural style: Late 19th And 20th Century Revivals, Tudor Revival, Beaux-Arts
- MPS: Cass Farm MPS
- NRHP reference No.: 97001100
- Added to NRHP: September 22, 1997

The Cass–Davenport Historic District is a historic district containing four apartment buildings in Detroit, Michigan, roughly bounded by Cass Avenue, Davenport Street, and Martin Luther King, Jr. Boulevard. The district was listed on the National Register of Historic Places in 1997. The Milner Arms Apartments (originally known as the Hotel Stevenson) abuts, but is not within, the district.

== History ==
The four apartment buildings within this district represent the change in apartment building design in the city of Detroit: from the small luxury apartment buildings constructed just after the turn of the twentieth century to the large scale apartment buildings constructed between 1915 and 1930.

Two of the four apartment buildings, the Davenport Apartment Building and the Chesterfield Apartments, were constructed by Theodore F. Shotwell during the first phase of apartment construction. These apartment buildings were small in scale, and included a small number of spacious units, designed to attract upper- and upper-middle class tenants. In 1905, Shotwell purchased land for the two buildings, and commissioned the masonry contracting and building firm of Putnam & Moore to erect the seven-unit Davenport Apartment at a cost of $10,500. In 1911, Shotwell began construction on the Chesterfield, at a cost of $26,000. The first tenants of the two buildings were lawyers, executives, and widows.

As the automotive industry brought a population boom to the city of Detroit, demand for housing increased substantially. In response, apartment buildings were constructed that were larger scale, high density buildings, with many smaller and more utilitarian apartments to appeal to the primarily middle-class workers looking for housing. The remaining two apartments in this district were constructed in this time period. In 1924, John and George Pouroujalian hired architect John Bergman to design the Aderna Court Apartments, which were built for approximately $119,000. The Aderna Court contained retail space on the first floor in addition to apartments above, and some of the first commercial tenants included a beauty shop, laundry, and tavern. Also in 1924, the firm of Pollmar and Ropes designed the Naomi Apartments, which were valued at $447,000 upon completion.

Of the four, only the Aderna Court Apartments have been continuously occupied. However, as of 2006, the Chesterfield has been redeveloped and is again open. The Davenport and Naomi Apartments have also been slated for redevelopment.

== Description ==
The district includes four apartment buildings near the corner of Cass Avenue and Martin Luther King, Jr. Boulevard: These buildings are all three to six stories tall and are constructed of brick with limestone or cast stone details. The group of buildings reflect a change in apartment building design in Detroit: starting with the small scale, luxurious apartment buildings built near the turn of the 20th century and continuing to the large scale, high density apartment buildings constructed between 1915 and 1930.

These buildings are:

=== Davenport Apartments, 149 Davenport ===
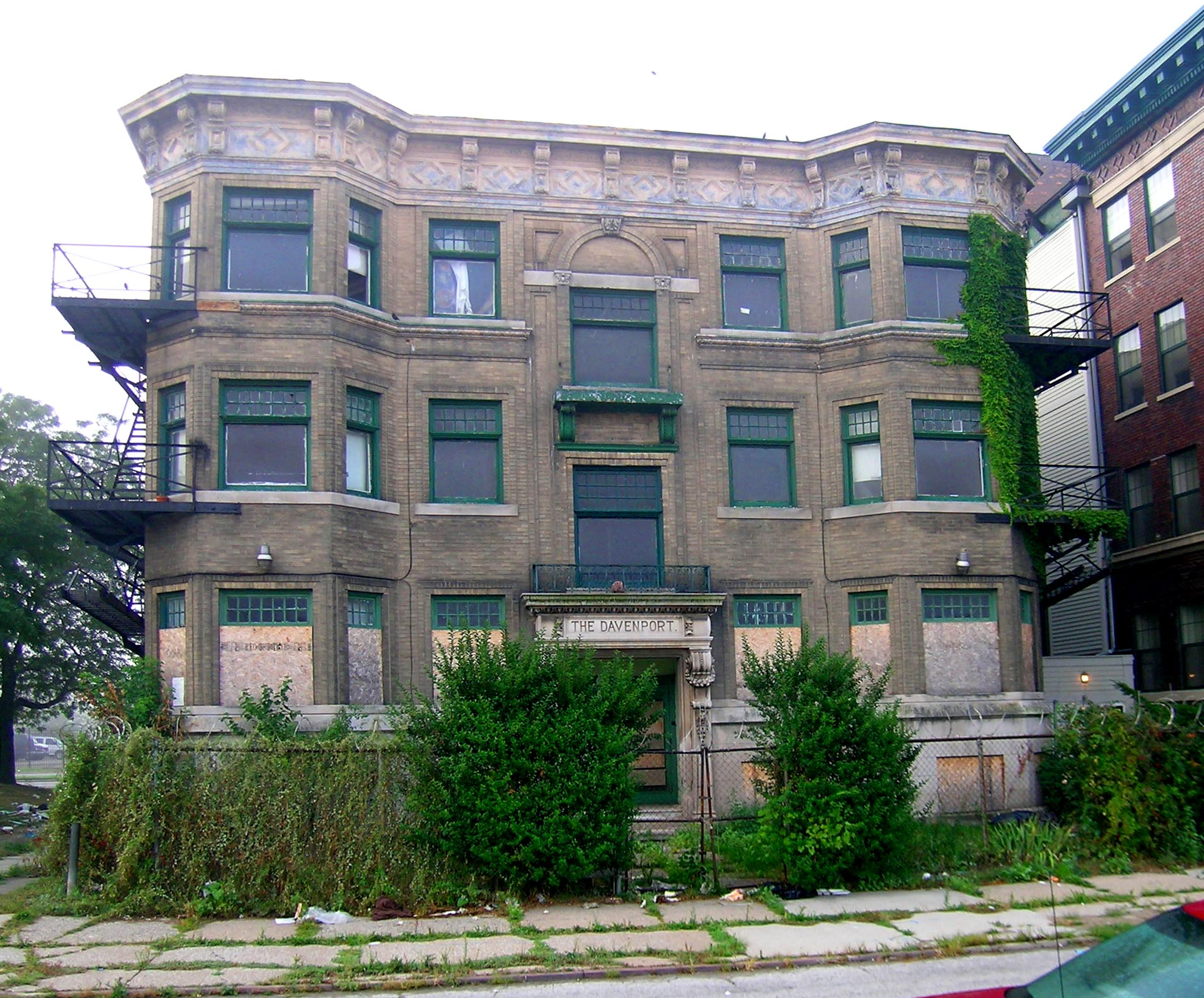
The Davenport Apartments Before Renovation and Restoration

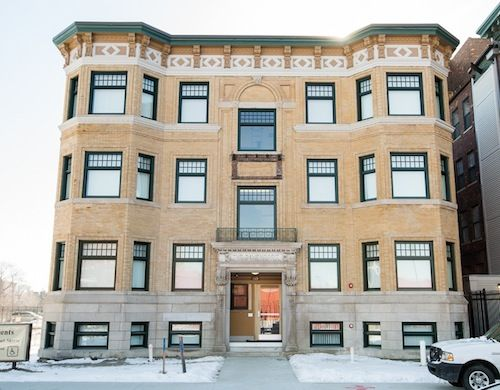
The Davenport Apartments After Renovation and Restoration

The Davenport Apartment is a Beaux-Arts, apartment building, constructed in 1905 by Putnam and Moore. The small building measures 50 feet by 55 feet. The facade is symmetric, with a masonry-clad ground floor. The center entrance is surrounded by masonry, with a cornice above and balconet below the second story window. Multi-sided bay windows run the height of the building at the corners of the front facade. The windows across the front have large lower panes and subdivided transoms above.

=== Chesterfield Apartments (Bon Rea Apartments), ===
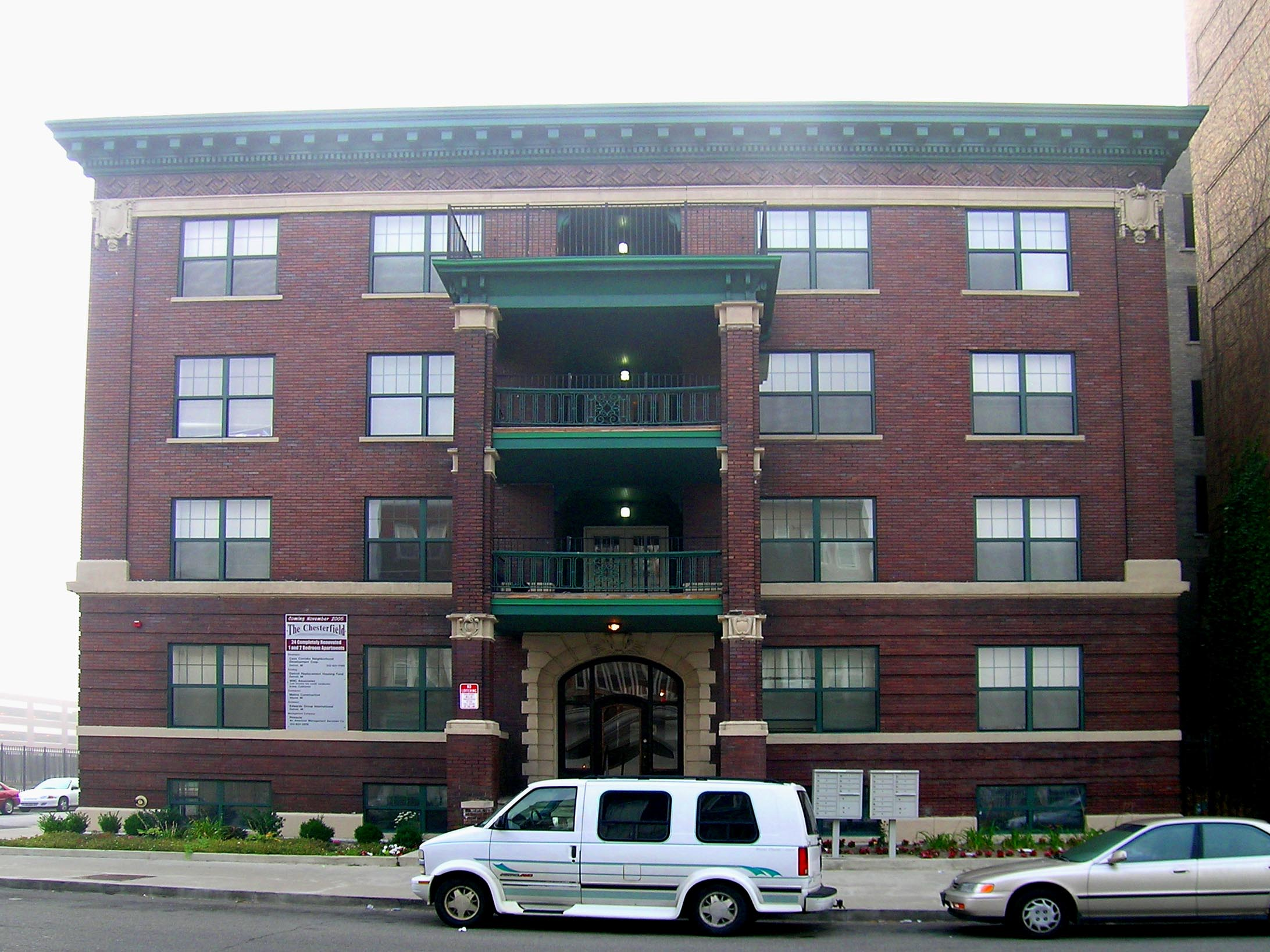

The Chesterfield Apartments is a Classical Revival, apartment building, constructed in 1911, and designed by Baxter and O'Dell. The four-story building sits on a raised basements, and measures 70 feet by 80 feet, The facade is symmetric, and contains a central three story, monumental portico with square brick piers and ornamental iron railings. The portico contains porches on the upper floors. The bays flanking the center contain groupings of paired windows on stone sills. Two stone stringcourses separate the first and second floors, and separate the fourth floor from the large cornice above.

=== Aderna Court Apartments (Wayne Court Apartments), 3527 Cass ===
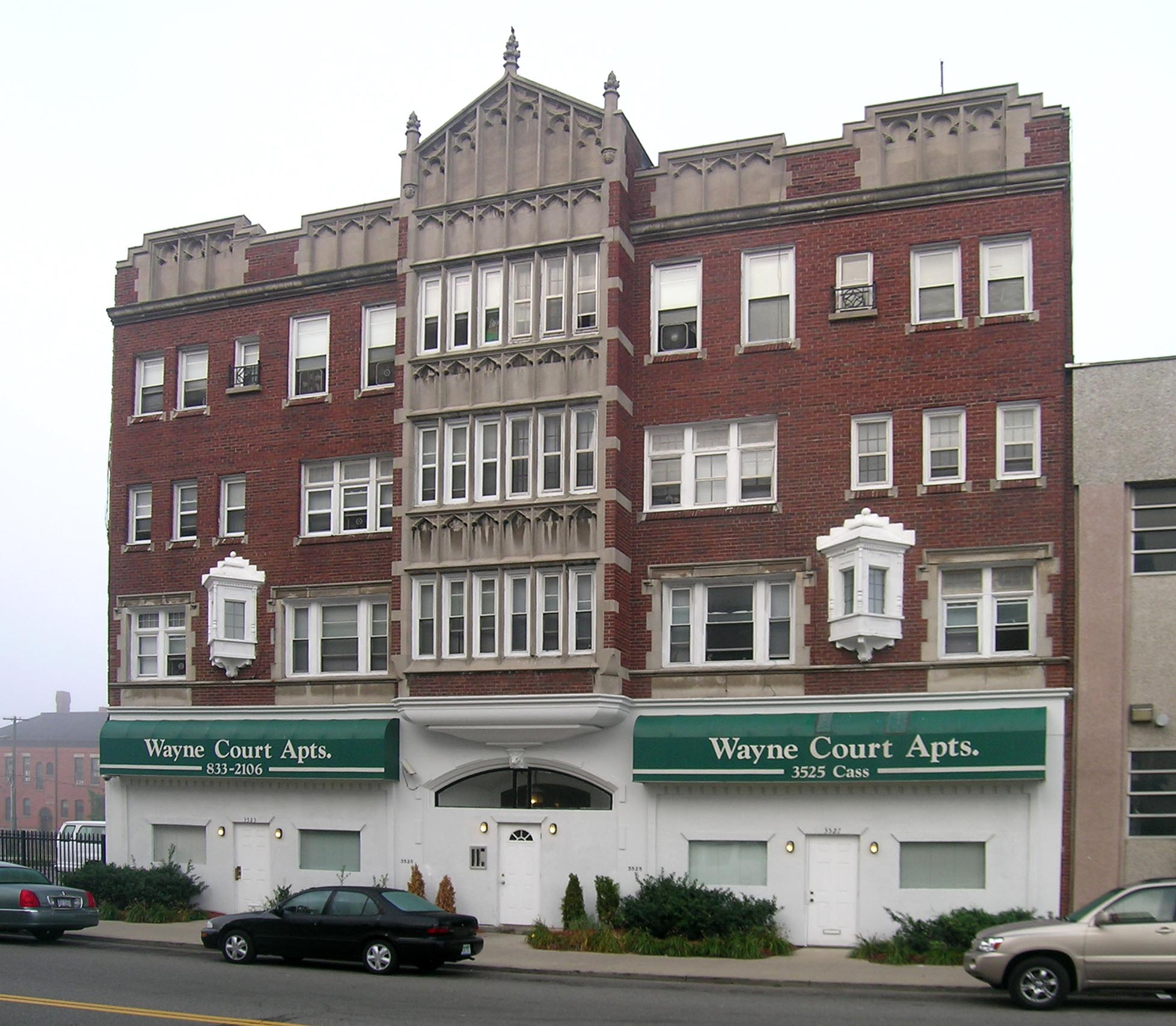

The Aderna Court Apartments is a Tudor Revival apartment building, constructed in 1924, and designed by John Bergman. It is a four-story brick building with a flat roof, measuring 67 feet by 136 feet. The first floor is stone faced, and contains storefront openings. The sides have two light courts each. The front facade is symmetrical, and divided into three bays. The narrower center bay holds the entrance, above which the bay projects slightly outward, forming a three-story tall oriel window. To each side of the central bay are a variety of window openings.

=== Naomi Apartments (Cass Plaza Apartments), 3550 Cass ===
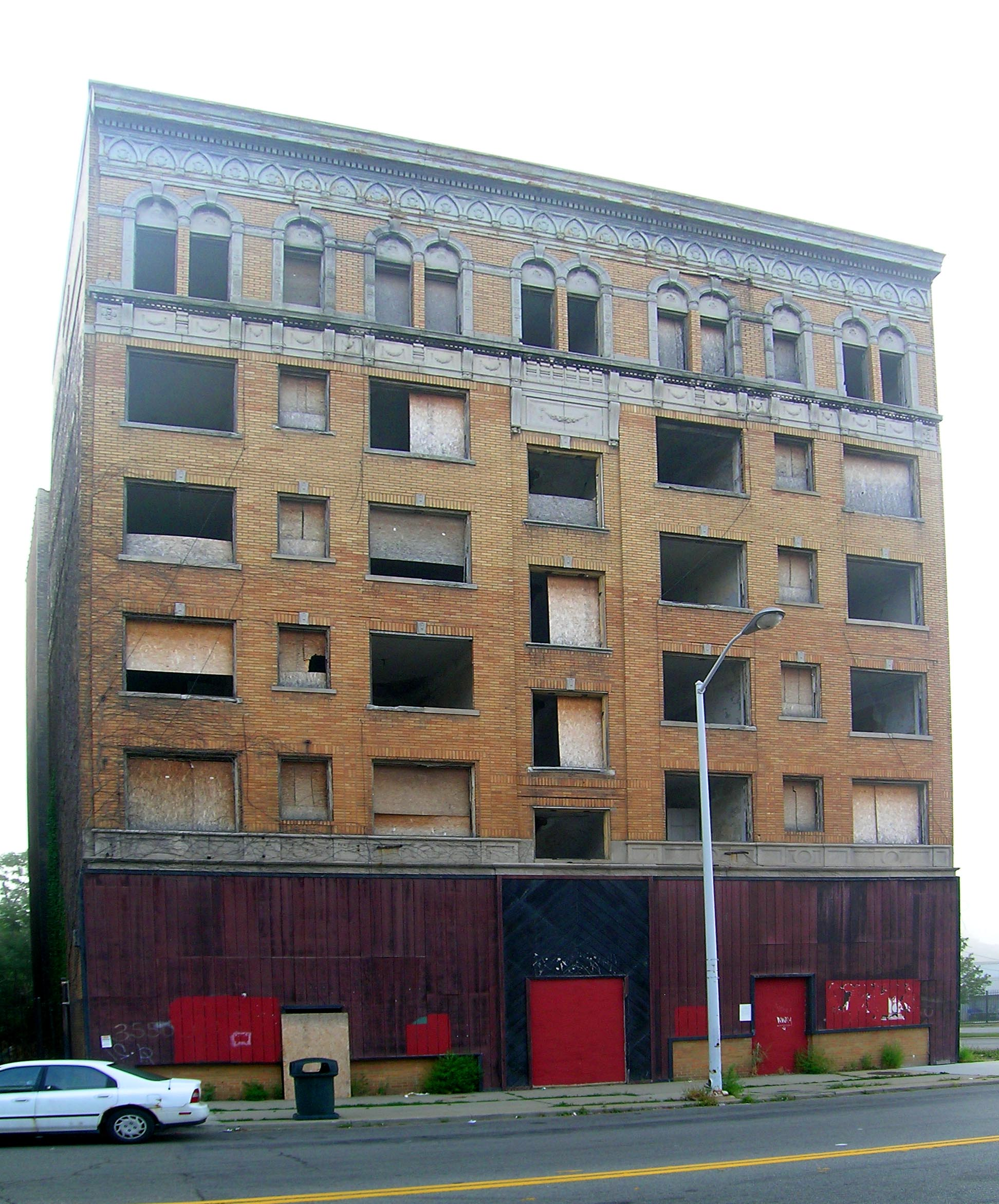
Cass Plaza Apartments Before Renovation and Restoration

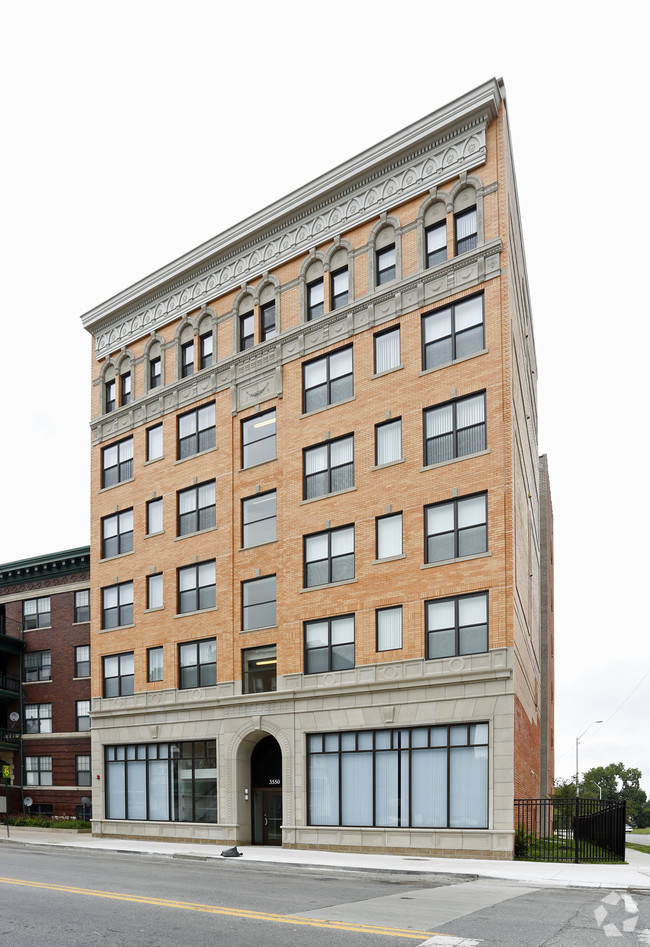
Cass Plaza Apartments After Renovation and Restoration

The Naomi Apartments is an Italian Renaissance apartment building, constructed in 1924 and designed by Pollmar and Ropes. It is a six-story brick structure measuring 60 feet by 166 feet. The facade is symmetrical, with a stone-covered first floor and stringcourse above, separating it from the upper floors. The windows are regularly arranged, with a flat arch overtop. The sixth floor has ornate arched window openings, with a cornice frieze below the floor and another decorative cornice above. The building has undergone $17 million renovation and restoration beginning in 2014 and has reopened in 2017.

== See also ==
- Cass Corridor
- Cass Park Historic District
