= Milner Arms Apartments =

- Milner Arms Apartments (Hotel Stevenson)
- U.S. National Register of Historic Places
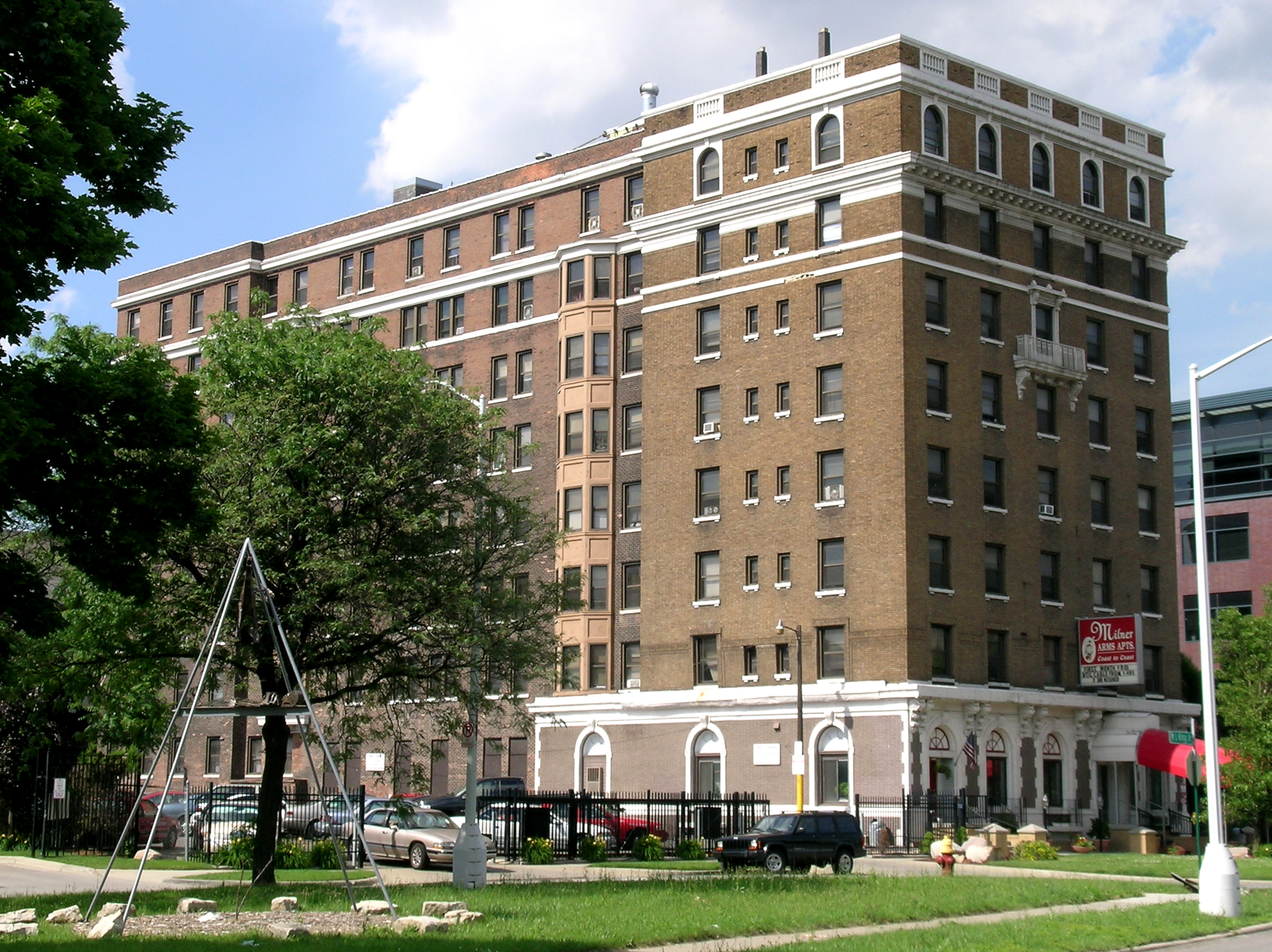
- View from Martin Luther King, Jr. Blvd.
- Interactive map
- Location: 40 Davenport Street; Detroit, Michigan
- Coordinates: 42°20′50″N 83°3′33″W
- Built: 1913
- Architect: Joseph P. Jogerst
- Architectural style: Late 19th And 20th Century Revivals, Georgian Revival
- MPS: Cass Farm MPS
- NRHP reference No.: 97001095
- Added to NRHP: September 22, 1997

The Milner Arms Apartments, originally known as the Hotel Stevenson, is a high rise building located at 40 Davenport Street in Midtown Detroit, Michigan; it was listed on the National Register of Historic Places in 1997. It is adjacent to, but not part of, the Cass-Davenport Historic District.

== History ==
Early in the 20th century, Charles Hugh Stevenson (1869-1943), his brother-in-law, Richard J. Helson (1868-1914), and his father-in-law, Richard Helson (1839-1919), founded the Davenport Realty Company. Charles Hugh Stevenson attended LeHigh University (Civil Engineering) and George Washington University (1896, LL.M, 1898, D.C.L.), was employed by U.S. Fish Commission 1891–1909, a lawyer and writer, and was internationally recognized for work in the hotel industry.

In 1913, the Davenport Realty Company built the Hotel Stevenson, commonly referred to by local newspapers as the Stevenson Hotel (named for Charles Hugh Stevenson). The hotel architect was Joseph P. Jogerst.

The advertisement for the Stevenson Hotel in the 1920 edition of the Official Hotel Red Book and Directory described the hotel as, "A quiet, luxurious place to live for a day, a week or a year. One, two, three room suites. Handsome appointments. Fireproof. Near the business and shopping districts. Splendid service, excellent cuisine and moderate prices make an irresistible combination for persons who know. Tourists and families are especially welcome. Garage."

The building was sold to the Milner Hotel Chain, which changed its name to the Taft Hotel, and later to the Milner Arms Apartments. In 2016, the building was sold to Broder & Sachse Real Estate Services, Inc. It is still in operation as an apartment building.

== Description ==
The Milner Arms is an eight-story rectangular Georgian Revival steel frame apartment building clad with brick. The facade is symmetric, with the exception of the first floor. The first floor contains five arched openings with masonry quoins; the second is the entrance. A projecting cornice with brackets separates the first floor from the upper stories. Floors two through seven have identical double hung single pane windows. There is a narrow belt course between floors six and seven, and the windows on the seventh floor have continuous sills. A heavy cornice separates the seventh and eighth floors. The eighth floor windows are arched, and a balustrade above caps the facade.

The Milner Arms contains a total of 93 apartments. Sixty-eight are studio apartments, ranging from 250 to 600 square feet. Twenty-two are one-bedroom units of about 800 square feet, and the remaining three are two-bedroom units of about 1,020 square feet.
