= Cass Farm Multiple Property Submission =

- U.S. National Register of Historic Places
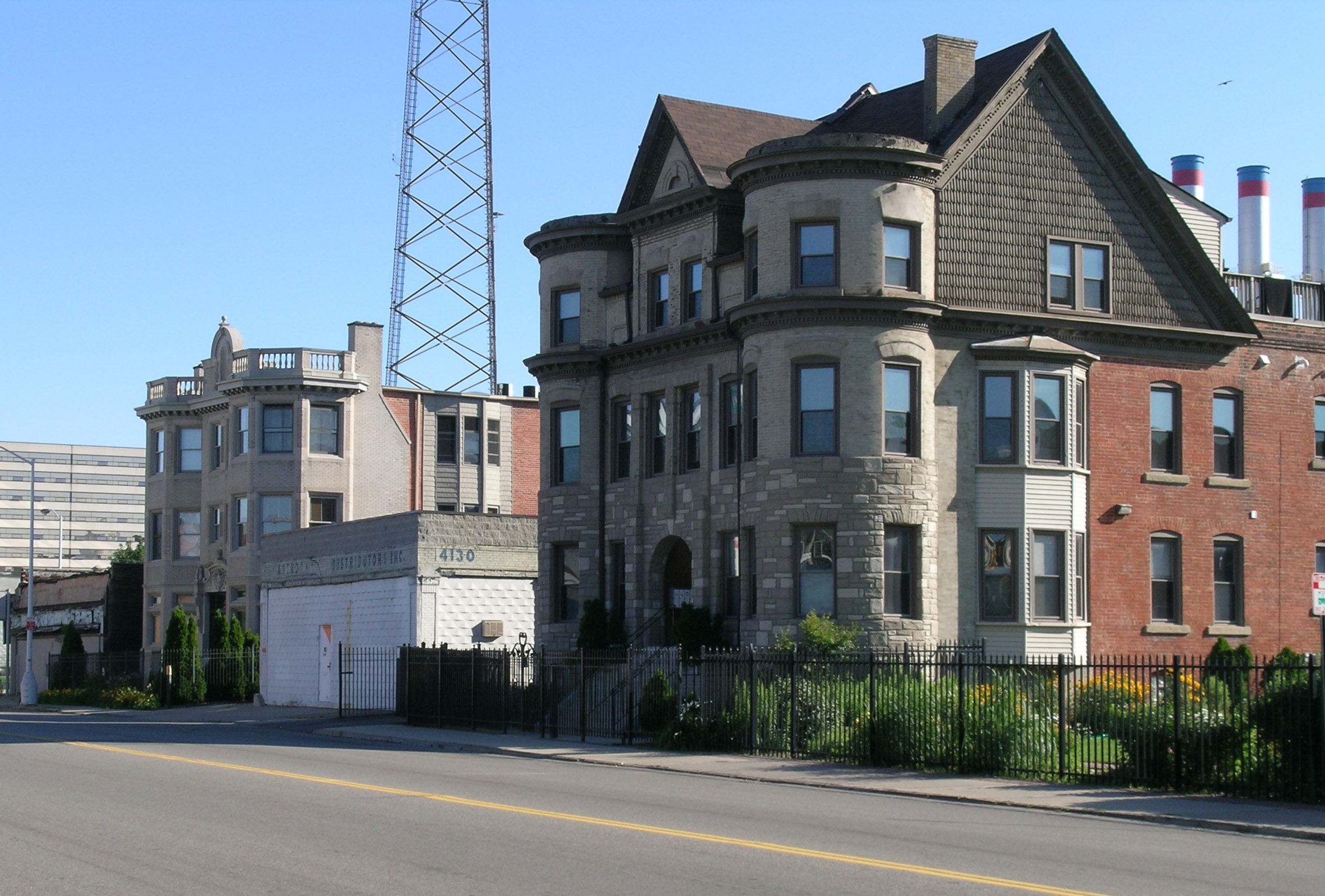
- Cass Avenue, north of Alexandrine, in the Willis-Selden Historic District
- Location: Detroit, Michigan, United States
- Coordinates: 42°20′57″N 83°3′52″W
- Built: 1870–1927
- Architect: Baxter & O'Dell, Putnam & Moore; Leon Coquard; Detroit Edison Company; Donaldson and Meier; C.F. Haglin & Sons; Smith, Hinchman, & Grylls; et al
- Architectural style: Colonial Revival, Beaux Arts, Early Commercial
- MPS: Cass Farm MPS
- NRHP reference No.: 97001092, 97001093, 97001095 - 97001101, 97001475, 97001477, 97001478
- Added to NRHP: December 1, 1997

The Cass Farm MPS is a US multiple property submission to the National Register of Historic Places which was approved on December 1, 1997. The structures included are all located in Midtown, in the Cass Farm area in Detroit, Michigan, USA. The Cass Farm area is defined as occupying the space between Woodward Avenue on the east, the Lodge Freeway on the west, Warren Avenue on the north, and Martin Luther King Jr. Boulevard on the south.

== History ==
=== 1800 - 1870 ===
The Cass Farm area spans portions of four original plattings. These include the rear portions of three original ribbon farms (the Cass Farm, the Jones/Crane Farm, and the Forsyth Farm), as well as a section of the Park Lots between Woodward and Cass.

The Park Lots were originally platted after the disastrous 1805 fire in Detroit. After the fire, the United States Congress authorized the platting of a new village at Detroit. Land titles were granted to settle remaining uncertainty over the ownership of some parcels, which was in part due to the then fairly recent departure of British colonial forces. During this platting, the land on both sides of the main thoroughfare, Woodward Avenue, was set aside, with congress authorizing the platting of the Park Lots. Development of the area, however, only started in the 1860s.

Cass Farm ran between what is now Cass Avenue and Third Avenue. In 1816, Lewis Cass purchased the ribbon farm. The property was gradually developed over the years, with the sections closest to the river being developed first. By the time Cass died in 1866, a few of the blocks north of Martin Luther King Boulevard had just been platted. Cass's children continued to plat the area after his death.

The Jones/Crane Farm was located between what is now Third Avenue and the alley east of Fourth Street. De Garmo Jones, onetime mayor of Detroit, received the property in 1823. The rear portion of the ribbon farm changed owners multiple times until Flavius JB Crane purchased it in 1854, when he began platting it.

The Forsythe Farm was located between what is now Fourth Street and the Lodge Freeway. John Forsythe purchased the property in 1829; it was later subdivided multiple times, with various owners eventually platting the property.

Development of the area was relatively slow. In the early part of the 19th century, residential growth in Detroit occurred primarily east and west of Woodward, along Fort Street and Jefferson Avenue; the areas near Cass Farm were still predominantly rural in nature. Urban development of the area did not really begin until 1870, when the population of Detroit was nearly 80,000. Streetcar lines established in the 1860s allowed residents to more conveniently travel from the Cass Farm area to downtown.

=== 1870 - 1910 ===
The West Canfield Historic District, platted in 1871, was one of the first recorded subdivisions in the area. The district features large and expensive lots, and many prominent Detroiters settled on the block. A severe depression slowed development, but it picked up again in the late 1870s. The period from 1880 to 1895 brought a boom in the construction of elegant single-family and duplex homes in the Cass Farm area. The lots on Woodward were the most expensive and featured the most opulent homes; the lots immediately off the main street were soon filled with the homes of Detroit's upper class. School and religious buildings were also constructed in the area.

As Detroit grew, the demand for apartment housing also grew; beginning in 1895, the construction in the Cass Farm area began to focus more on small apartment buildings. This was particularly true in the last portion of the district to be developed, the section south of Warren between Cass and Third. Here a number of small-scale apartment buildings were constructed around the turn of the 20th century.

=== 1910 - 1940 ===
As the city continued to expand, the character of the neighborhood changed. Even before World War I, the congestion along Woodward precipitated a change from upper-class housing to commercial ventures. The construction of Orchestra Hall heralded a City Beautiful movement that turned much of the area into public-oriented space.

The rise of the automobile also changed the area. Cass Farm's proximity to the automotive plants in the Milwaukee Junction area made it ideal for housing auto workers. During the 1910s and 1920s, larger apartment buildings were constructed in the area, and many remaining single-family homes were converted into boardinghouses. Commercial usage also increased in the area, particularly in automotive-related sectors: showrooms, service stations, and part supply businesses.

=== 1930 - onward ===
The Great Depression heralded the beginning of a long decline for the Cass Farm area. Newly constructed buildings fell into foreclosure, and many of the formerly well-paid auto workers living in the area were out of work. By the time the industrial recovery from World War II stimulated the economy, industry had relocated to the suburbs, and the economic recovery for the most part passed the area by.

In the 1950s, widespread demolition of houses and businesses began, a practice that extended into the 1980s. Wayne State University also began to have more influence in the area, rehabilitating old buildings and building new ones. As the focus shifted to urban rehabilitation in the 1990s, more structures in the area have been refurbished, by Wayne State, other public groups, and by private parties.

== Structures in the Cass Farm MPS ==
There are twelve structures and districts in the Cass Farm MPS; these are shown below. The structures are from all periods of development of the area.

Resource Name	Image	Address	Built	Architect	Note
Cass-Davenport Historic District		Bounded Cass Ave., Davenport, and Martin Luther King Jr. Blvd	1905–1924	Baxter & O'Dell; Putnam & Moore	
Chapel of St. Theresa-the Little Flower		46 Parsons Street	1926	Donaldson and Meier	
Detroit Edison Company Willis Avenue Station		50 West Willis	1916	Detroit Edison Company	
Detroit-Columbia Central Office Building		52 Selden Street	1927	Smith, Hinchman, & Grylls	
Graybar Electric Company Building		55 West Canfield	1926	C.F. Haglin & Sons	
Hotel Stevenson		40 Davenport Street	1913	Joseph P. Jogerst	Now known as the Milner Arms .
Robert M. and Matilda (Kitch) Grindley House		123 Parsons Street	1897	Putnam and Moore	
League of Catholic Women Building		100 Parsons Street	1927	Smith, Hinchman & Grylls	
Sts. Peter and Paul Academy		64 Parsons Street	1892	Leon Coquard	Currently known as the St. Patrick Senior Center
Warren-Prentis Historic District		Prentis, Forest, Hancock, & south side of Warren, from Woodward to Third Avenue	1880–1895	Multiple	
West Canfield Historic District (Boundary Increase)		Third Street, south of Canfield	1871	Unknown	
Willis-Selden Historic District		Willis, Alexandrine, and Selden, from Woodward to Third Avenue	1870	Multiple	

These structures represent the range of construction in the Cass Farm area. The earliest structures are in the West Canfield Historic District boundary increase; these structures include both a Victorian private home and two Victorian commercial structures, among the earliest in the neighborhood. The Robert M. and Matilda (Kitch) Grindley House (now unfortunately demolished) was another 19th-century single-family home, dating from the time when the Cass Farm area was still primarily upscale residential.

The Warren-Prentis Historic District is primarily a mix of early private homes and small apartment buildings that moved into the neighborhood around the turn of the 20th century. Around the same time, the Sts. Peter and Paul Academy was built to serve the growing population of the neighborhood.

The Willis-Selden Historic District primarily contains somewhat later structures, demonstrating the mix of small apartments and the commercial buildings that entered the district as the automobile industry grew importance. Another commercial building is the Graybar Electric Company Building. Near the same time, increasing infrastructure requirements made the Detroit Edison Company Willis Avenue Station and the Detroit-Columbia Central Office Building necessary for the neighborhood.

Finally, the Cass-Davenport Historic District shows a mix of small apartment buildings and the later, larger apartment buildings that were built in the 1920s, as space in the city became more valuable. Another large apartment building, the Hotel Stevenson, is also included in the MPS, as is the League of Catholic Women Building, built to house the influx of young unmarried women coming to the city. The Chapel of St. Theresa-the Little Flower was also built about this time.
