= Coronado Apartments =

- U.S. National Register of Historic Places
- U.S. Historic district – Contributing property
- Michigan State Historic Site
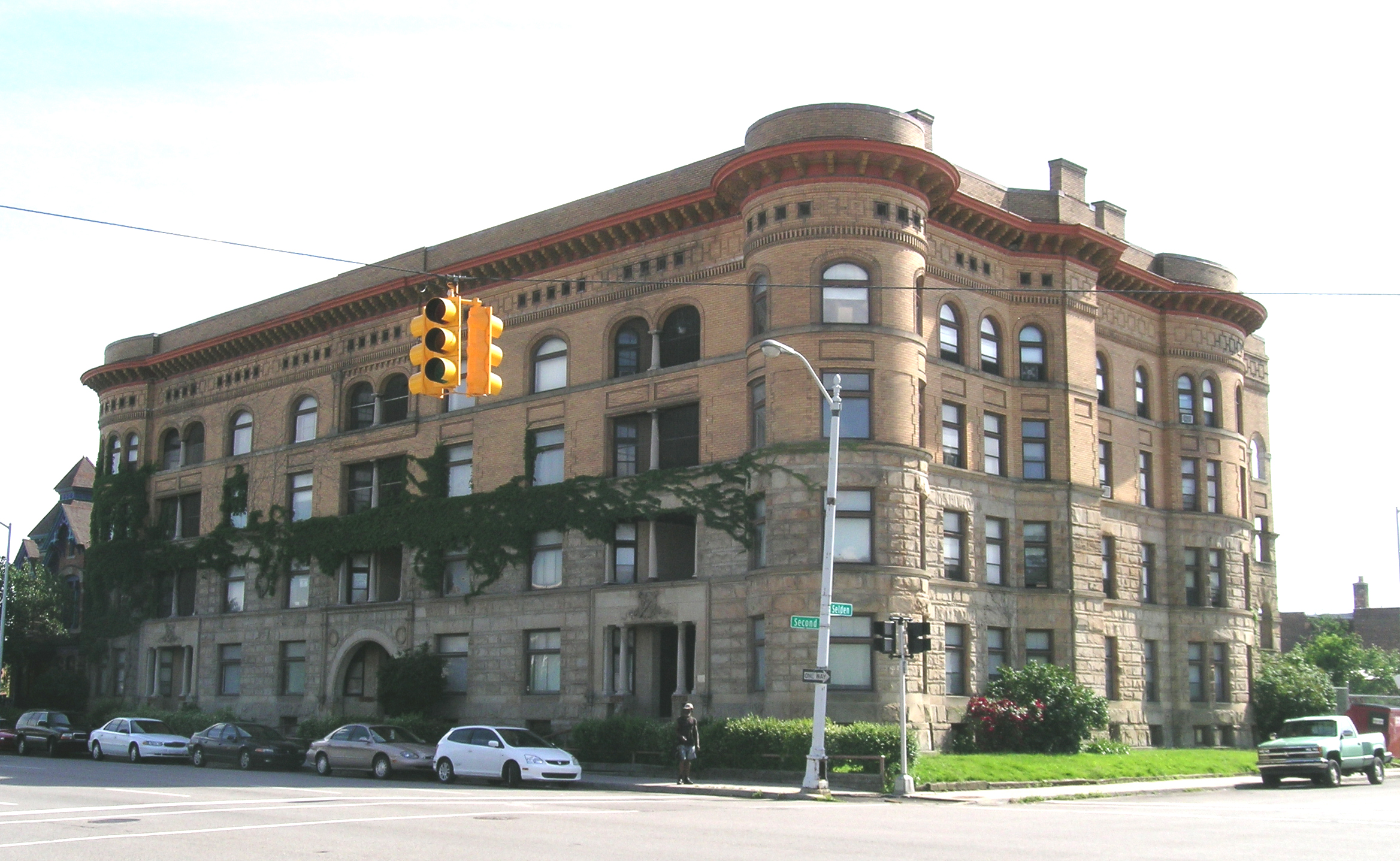
- Interactive map
- Location: 3751-73 Second Avenue; Detroit, Michigan
- Coordinates: 42°20′49″N 83°3′52″W
- Built: 1894
- Architect: William S. Joy
- Architectural style: Romanesque Revival
- Part of: Willis-Selden Historic District (ID97001478)
- NRHP reference No.: 82002897

Significant dates
- Added to NRHP: April 22, 1982
- Designated CP: December 01, 1997
- Designated MSHS: October 2, 1980

The Coronado Apartments is an apartment building located on 3751–73 Second Avenue (on the corner of Second and Selden) in Midtown Detroit, Michigan. It was designated a Michigan State Historic Site in 1980 and listed on the National Register of Historic Places in 1982.

== History ==
The Coronado Apartments were built in 1894 by George D. Nutt, a prominent Detroit builder, and the architectural firm of William S. Joy & Company. The building was one of the first apartment buildings in Detroit built for affluent middle class citizens at a time when apartment living was just becoming socially acceptable. The Coronado remained a fashionable address until the 1930s, when declining demand for large apartments, and increased demand for smaller units, led the Coronados owners to divide the formerly spacious apartments in two. No further renovation was done until 1982, when the owners began a restoration and remodeling project.

== Architecture ==
The Coronado is a four-story Romanesque apartment building built on a high basement. It is constructed of yellow brick and rusticated sandstone with a flat roof and architecturally designed elevations on both the Second and Selden avenues sides. The Second Avenue façade is primarily symmetrical, with three entrances and open loggias on the floors above each. The façade is terminated at the south end by a curved bay window and at the north (Selden) corner by a round turret. The building is divided horizontally, with rusticated sandstone forming the outer walls up through the second story, and yellow brick above. A broad cornice and wide panelled brick frieze, pierced with ventilation holes, tops the building.
