= Saints Peter and Paul Academy =

- Sts. Peter and Paul Academy
- U.S. National Register of Historic Places
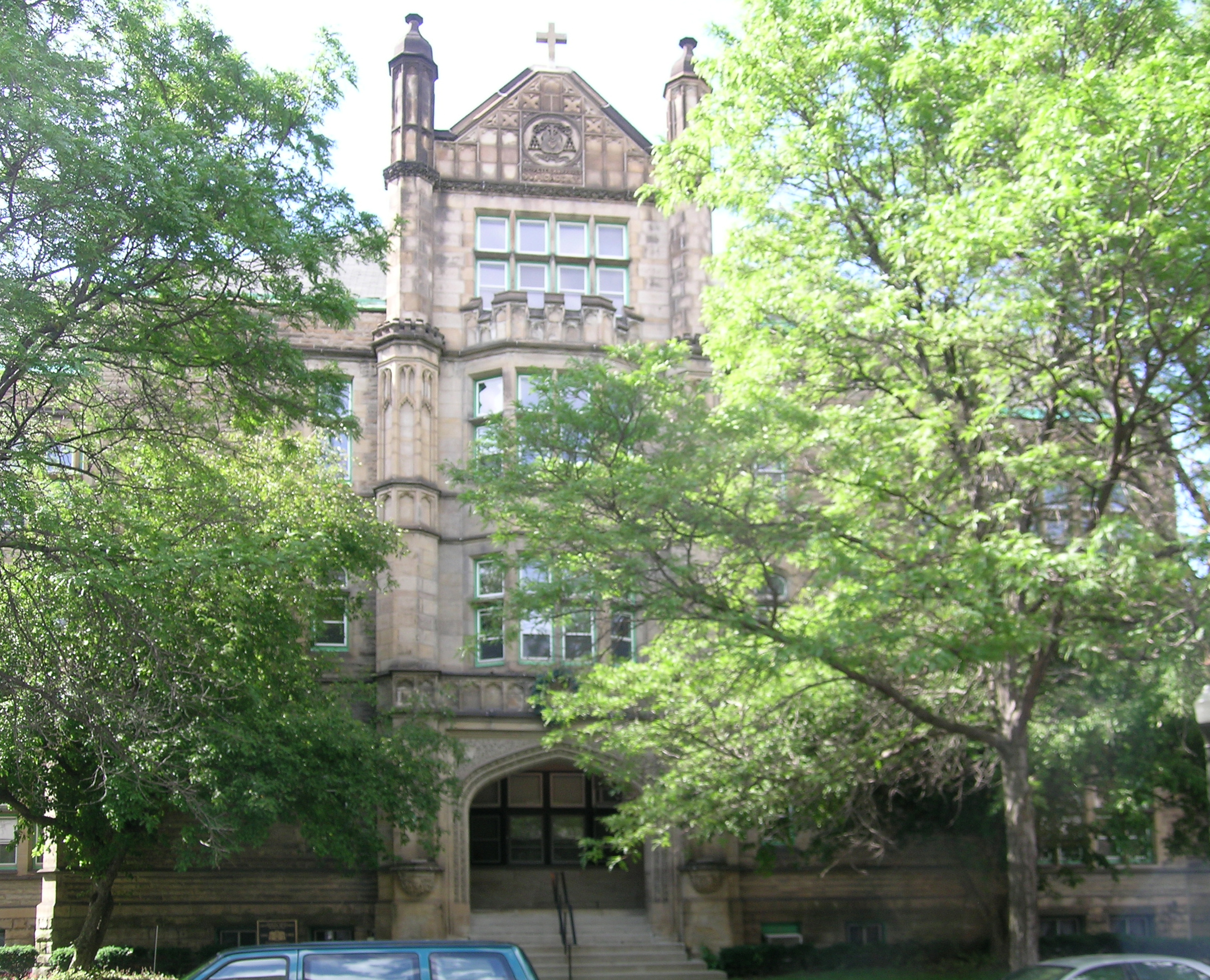
- Interactive map
- Location: 64 Parsons Street; Detroit, Michigan
- Coordinates: 42°20′54″N 83°3′37″W
- Built: 1892
- Architect: Leon Coquard
- Architectural style: Gothic Revival
- MPS: Cass Farm MPS
- NRHP reference No.: 97001101
- Added to NRHP: September 22, 1997

Sts. Peter and Paul Academy is a Catholic school building located at 64 Parsons Street in Midtown Detroit, Michigan. It currently serves as the St. Patrick Senior Center. It was listed on the National Register of Historic Places in 1997.

== History ==
St. Patrick Parish began in 1862, in response to the influx of Irish Catholics into Detroit. By 1880, St. Patrick had become one of Detroit's largest and wealthiest parishes, and in 1890 the parish name was changed to "Sts. Peter and Paul." In 1892, to serve the children of the community, a school was built on Parsons.

From the time it opened in 1893 until 1969, the school functioned as a co-ed grade school and a high school for girls. The parish resumed its original name of St. Patrick in 1938, and the high school was renamed "Immaculata High School". The high school was soon renamed again as "Girls’ Catholic Central High School", and the grade school was renamed "St. Patrick’s Grade School"; both names stuck until the school was closed in 1969.

After the closing, the school was vacant for three years, until re-opening as the "St. Patrick Senior Center." The organization has continued to the present day, providing hot meals, health care, transportation assistance, and educational classes for the elderly, in association with the next-door St. Patrick Church.

== See also ==
- Archdiocese of Detroit
