= Stuber–Stone Building =

Historic building in Detroit, Michigan, USA

- U.S. National Register of Historic Places
- U.S. Historic district – Contributing property
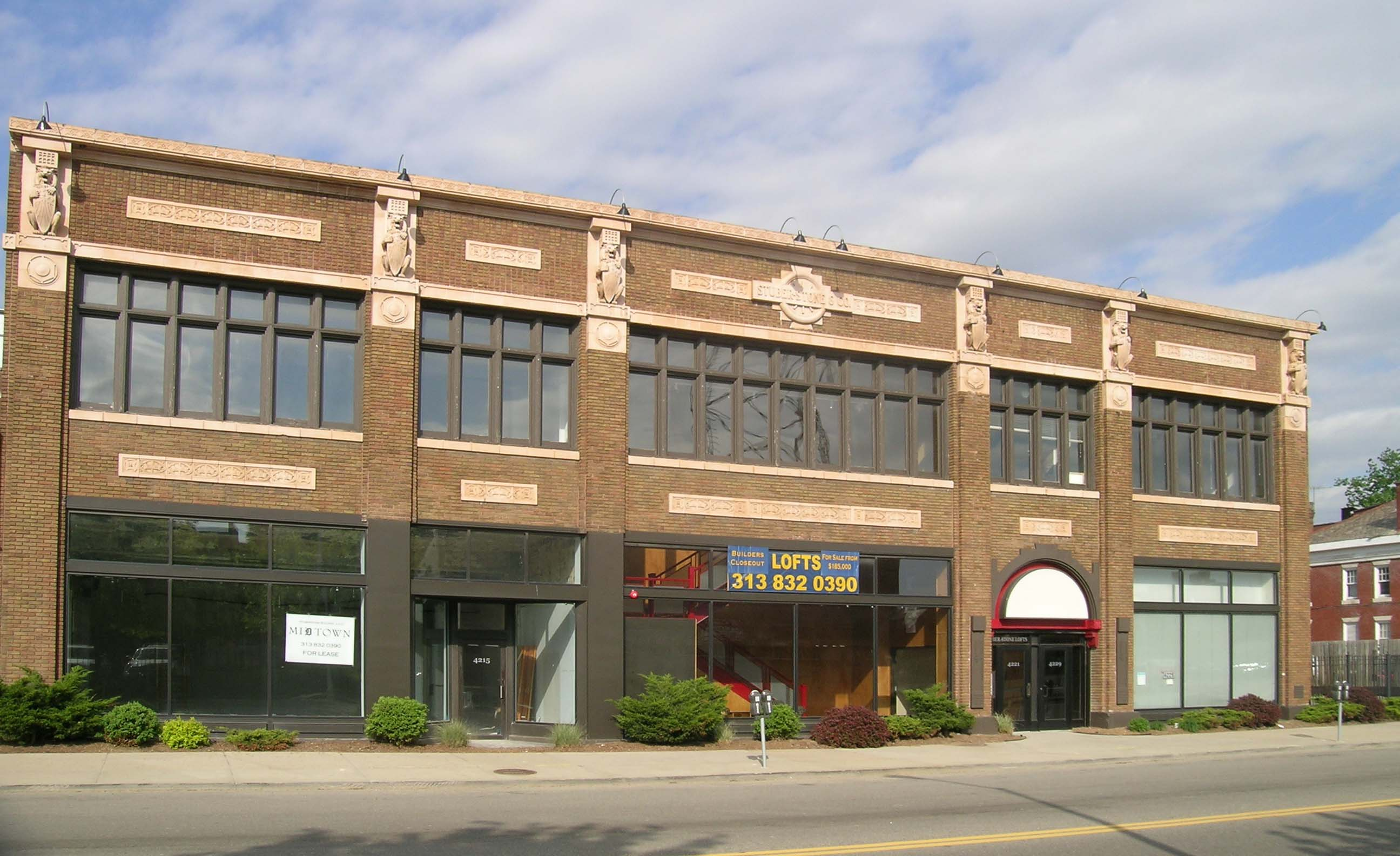
- Interactive map
- Location: 4221–4229 Cass Avenue; Detroit, Michigan
- Coordinates: 42°21′2.68″N 83°3′50.82″W
- Built: 1916
- Architect: A. J. Smith Construction Co.
- Architectural style: Sullivanesque
- Part of: Willis-Selden Historic District (ID97001478)
- NRHP reference No.: 96000369

Significant dates
- Added to NRHP: April 04, 1996
- Designated CP: December 01, 1997

The Stuber–Stone Building is located at 4221–4229 Cass Avenue in Detroit, Michigan. It was listed on the National Register of Historic Places in 1996. It is now known as the Stuberstone Lofts.

== History ==
The Stuber–Stone building was built in 1916 by developer David W. Simmons. It had two separate entrances, and originally was subdivided to house multiple tenants. The building initially housed the automobile dealership of Stuber–Stone & Company, who sold Columbia Motors (founded in Detroit by William E. Metzger) and Abbott-Detroit cars. Stuber–Stone was founded in 1917 by Edwin W. Stuber, Norman T. Stone and Otto R. Neumann. The company occupied the occupied 4221-4227 Cass portion of the building, with the Rotary Tire Service Company (owned by Stuber) occupying 4229 Cass.

In 1919, Owen Tire and Auto Supply Company replaced Rotary Tire, and in 1924, the Hupmobile dealership of D. E. Meyer Company moved into the building, replacing Stuber–Stone. In 1930, Jordan Distributors, Inc. who distributed Jordan Motor Cars, moved in. A series of other automobile dealers and parts suppliers occupied portions of the building into the 1940s.

== Description ==
The Stuber–Stone building is a two-story brick Sullivanesque commercial building measuring 100 feet by 150 feet. The main facade is divided into five bays two-story piers, with three wider bays containing storefronts in the center and on each end, and two narrower bays containing entrances interspersed. The right-hand entrance has an arched opening trimmed in limestone, and rectangular terra cotta panels are located on the piers flanking the entrance. The first and second floors are divided by a wide decorative spandrel.

On the second floor, each of the bays contains a bank of tall, narrow, windows, with nine in the central bay, four in the narrower entry bays, and six in the outer bays. Decorative terra cotta panels are placed above and below the windows. The upper panel in the central bay of the building contains a circular medallion in the shape of a wheel, with a Stuber–Stone & Co. name plate. Each pier separating the bays is topped with a lion figurine perched on its hind legs and holding a shield. The main facade's design wraps around onto some of the right-hand elevation; the remainder of the building exterior is industrial in character.
