= Graybar Electric Company Building =

- U.S. National Register of Historic Places
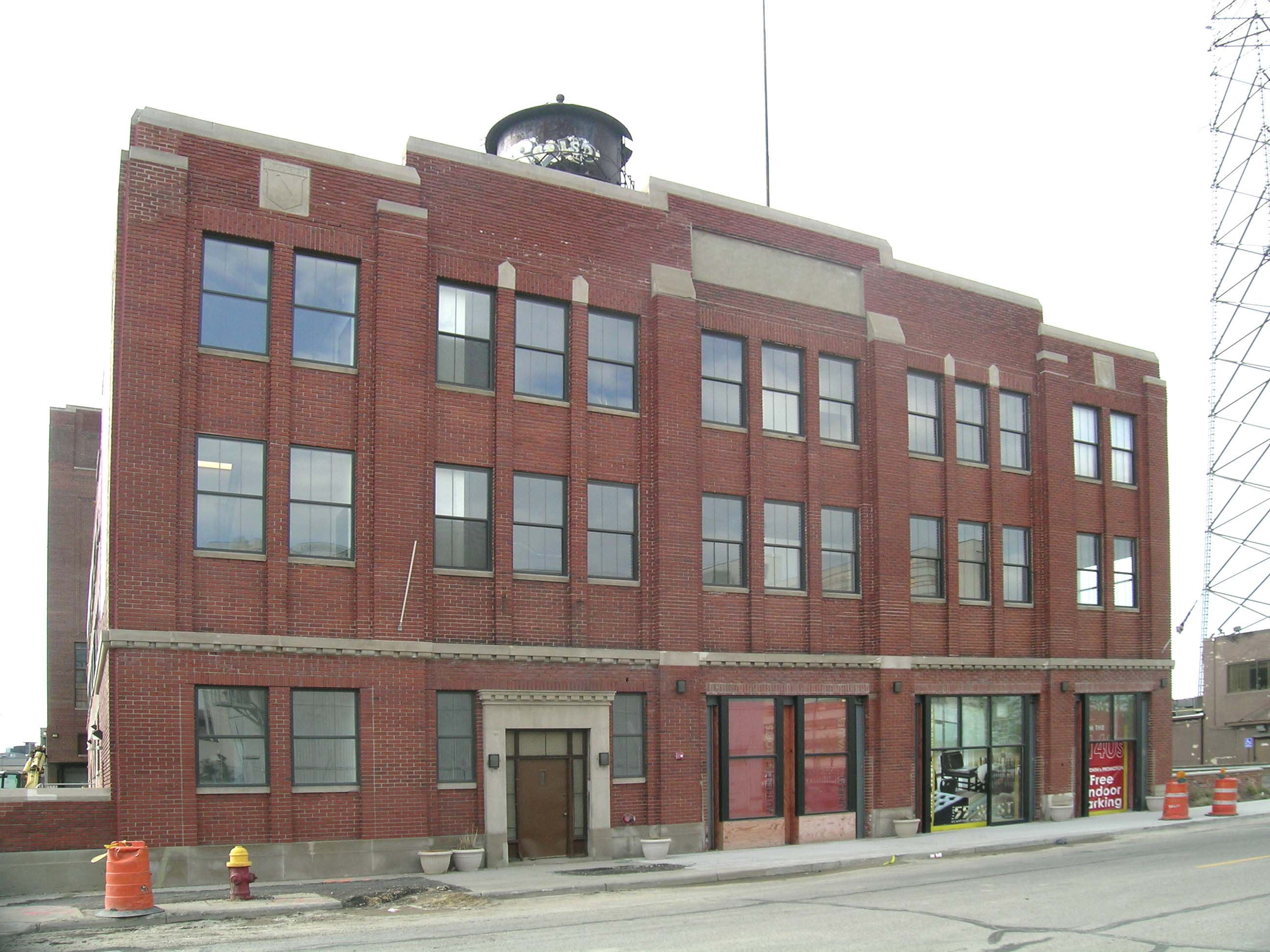
- Interactive map
- Location: 55 West Canfield Street; Detroit, Michigan
- Coordinates: 42°21′8″N 83°3′45″W
- Built: 1926
- Built by: C.F. Haglin & Sons
- MPS: Cass Farm MPS
- NRHP reference No.: 97001096
- Added to NRHP: September 22, 1997

The Graybar Electric Company Building is located at 55 West Canfield Street in Midtown Detroit, Michigan. This warehouse building was rented to the Graybar Electric Company from 1926 into the 1940s. It was listed on the National Register of Historic Places in 1997.

== History ==
The Graybar Electric Company was founded in 1869 in Cleveland, Ohio to sell communications equipment to the public. The company was instantly successful and soon Anson Stager, General Superintendent of the Western Union Telegraph Company, bought in and moved the company to Chicago. In 1872 the business was incorporated as the Western Electric Manufacturing Company. The company grew rapidly after the 1875 invention of the telephone, becoming more involved with manufacturing telephone apparatus, as well continuing to manufacture and distribute a range of electrical equipment.

By 1926, Western Electric was so enormous that it spun off a separate entity specifically to handle the distribution of electrical supplies and equipment. This new entity was named Graybar, echoing the company's original 1869 name. The new company was immediately the country's leading wholesaler of electrical supplies and equipment, with 59 distributing houses across the US. This building in Detroit was constructed in 1926 by C.F. Haglin & Sons for the Graybar Electric Company. Haglin leased the building to Graybar, who occupied the building well into the 1940s. The building later was used by the Detroit Board of Education as their Audio-Visual Department. In 2000, the building was converted into loft space.

== Description ==
The Graybar Electric Company Building is a three-story, brick and concrete, industrial style building, originally constructed to house offices and warehouse space. The brick front facade is symmetrical, divided into bays by brick piers which rise from a stone string course between the first and second stories. The piers terminate in a stepped parapet, with both parapet and pier tops made from cast stone. The entrance is off center, with garage door openings to one side. Windows on the upper floors are grouped between the piers, with three windows per bay on the inner bays and two windows per bay on the outer bays. Above each outer bay is a cast stone panel bearing a shield.
