= Willis Avenue Station =

- U.S. National Register of Historic Places
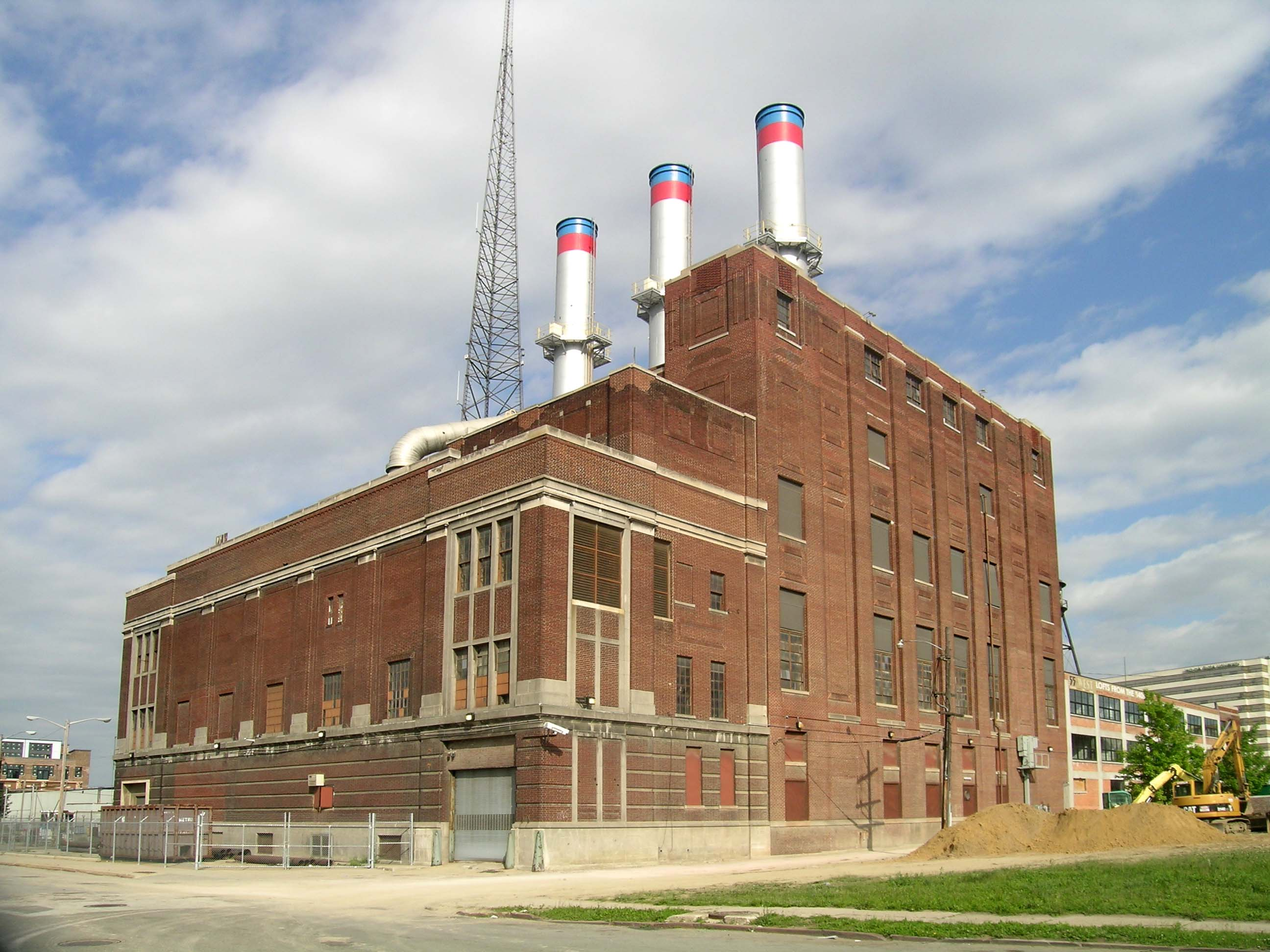
- Interactive map
- Location: 50 West Willis Street; Detroit, Michigan
- Coordinates: 42°21′5.6″N 83°3′43.41″W
- Built: 1916
- Architect: Detroit Edison Company
- Architectural style: Late 19th And 20th Century Revivals, Colonial Revival
- MPS: Cass Farm MPS
- NRHP reference No.: 97001097
- Added to NRHP: September 22, 1997

The Willis Avenue Station is a steam production plant used in Detroit's district steam heating system. The plant is located at 50 West Willis Street, near Woodward Avenue, in the center of the city's Midtown Detroit neighborhood. Built and owned by the Detroit Edison Company, it was listed on the National Register of Historic Places in 1997.

== History ==
Detroit Edison was organized in 1903 to build and operate electric plants in Detroit. The Willis Avenue station was the first steam power substation used by Detroit Edison for the production of steam heat. Three other plants serve the central heating district of Detroit.

When the plant first went on line in 1904, there were 3,000 feet (910 m) of mains in place, serving only 12 customers. During the summer of that year, an additional 10,000 feet (3,000 m) of mains were constructed, and the infrastructure was increased as the years passed. By the mid-1940s, there were 42 miles (68 km) of underground mains and serving approximately 1,650 customers. During that time, the Willis Avenue Plant was updated and altered numerous times to serve the heating needs of the community, especially between 1916-1927. The station continues to serve the Cass Farm Survey Area.

=== Henry Ford ===
This station in located near the original location of an electric generating sub-station owned and operated by the Edison Illuminating Company. It began operation in 1886. Henry Ford began his career with the Edison Illuminating Company on September 25, 1891 assigned to this substation as a Steam Engineer, working the 6:00pm to 6:00am shift.

== See also ==
- Holly Steam Combination Company
