= Chapel of St. Theresa–the Little Flower =

Historic church in Michigan, United States

- U.S. National Register of Historic Places
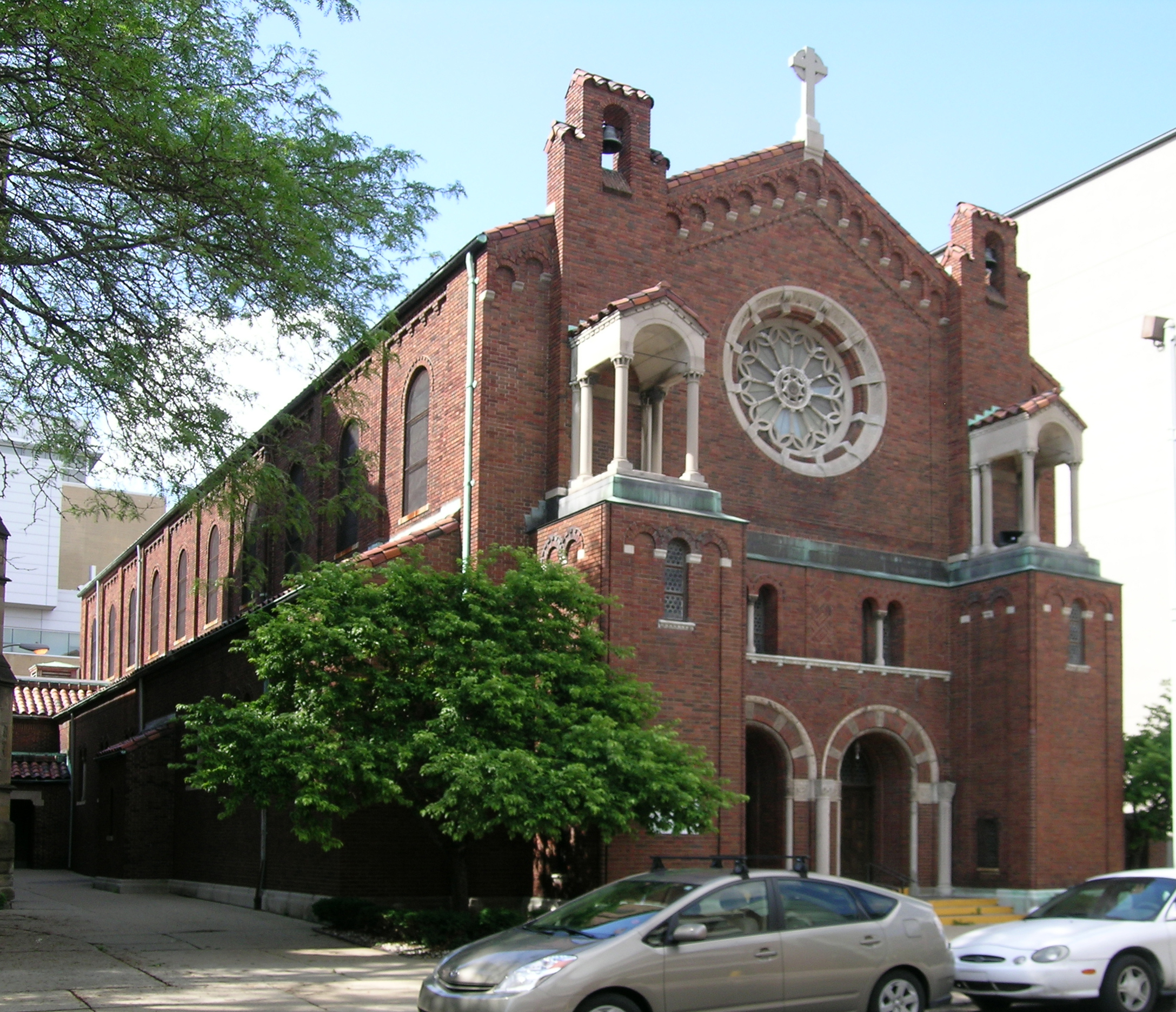
- Interactive map
- Location: 58 Parsons Street; Detroit, Michigan
- Coordinates: 42°20′54″N 83°3′36″W
- Built: 1926
- Architect: Donaldson and Meier
- Architectural style: Late 19th And 20th Century Revivals, Late Victorian, Romanesque Revival
- Demolished: 2023
- MPS: Cass Farm MPS
- NRHP reference No.: 97001099
- Added to NRHP: September 22, 1997

The Chapel of St. Theresa–the Little Flower was a church located at 58 Parsons Street in Midtown Detroit, Michigan. It was later known as St. Patrick Church. The building was listed on the National Register of Historic Places in 1997, and demolished in September 2023.

== History ==
St. Patrick Parish began in 1862 in response to the influx of Irish Catholics into Detroit. The parish built a chapel on Adelaide near John R. Street, which was eventually expanded into a church. St. Patrick's became one of Detroit's largest and wealthiest parishes, although the church was never one of Detroit's largest or most impressive. In 1890, the church was named the cathedral of the diocese and was renamed in honor of Sts. Peter and Paul as the prior cathedral church on East Jefferson had been. Bishop Caspar Borgess gave the old Sts. Peter and Paul to the Jesuits in 1877 after he moved to the new cathedral. In 1892, to serve the children of the community, the Sts. Peter and Paul Academy was built on Parsons west of Woodward, which was some distance away from the main church.

By the 1920s the streets in the area had become so busy that the trek from church to school was considered unsafe for children going to school Masses. As a remedy, the parish constructed the Chapel of St. Theresa, the Little Flower in 1926, naming the chapel after Thérèse de Lisieux. In 1938, the cathedral function was transferred to Blessed Sacrament parish and St. Patrick's reverted to its original name. As the years passed, the area around the original St. Patrick church steadily declined, and more activities were held in the chapel and school. All activities were moved to Parsons Street in the 1980s and the old church was given to a community group. Essentially abandoned for a number of years, it was then vandalized and eventually burned in 1992.

Due to declining membership, Archbishop Allen Vigneron announced May 8, 2015, that the parish would dissolve May 25. The archdiocese said it would retain the structure in the hope that the parish could be reactivated at a future date due to revitalization of the area, however this did not happen.

Demolition of the Chapel on Parsons Street began on September 22, 2023.

== Architecture ==
The chapel was in the Romanesque Revival style with a basilica floorplan. It was constructed of red brick with limestone accents and a red tile roof. The entrance was recessed in twin arches framed by square bays. The bays were each topped by a limestone portico consisting of a barrel vault supported by four Corinthian columns. The gabled roofs of the porticoes were covered with red tile matching the other portions of the roof. Above the entry doors on the clerestory level were small arched windows and above the clerestory was a small rose window. Above the porticos were two small campanario each holding a bell.

== See also ==
- Archdiocese of Detroit
