= Hilberry =

Hilberry is a surname. Notable people with the surname include:

- Conrad Hilberry (1928–2017), American poet and author
- Norman Hilberry (1899–1986), American physicist

== See also ==
- Hilberry Gateway, performing arts theatre
- Hilberry Theatre, auditorium
- Malcolm Hilbery (1883–1965), British judge
