= Midtown Woodward Historic District =

Historic district in Michigan, United States

- U.S. National Register of Historic Places
- U.S. Historic district
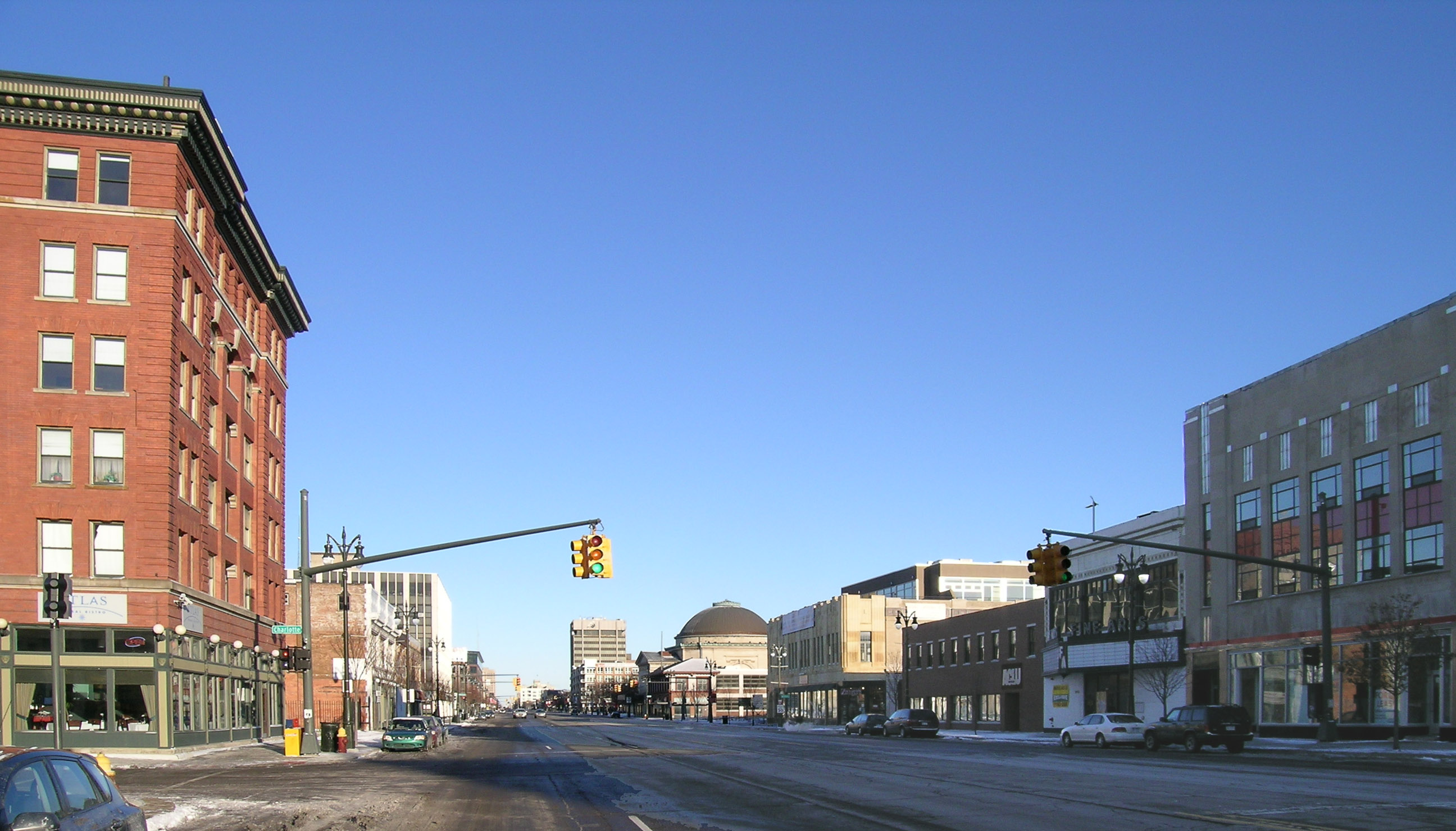
- Looking north along Woodward
- Interactive map
- Location: 2951-3424 Woodward Ave., 14 Charlotte St., 10 and 25 Peterboro St., Detroit, Michigan, U.S.
- Coordinates: 42°20′43.5″N 83°3′23.5″W
- Area: 8.7 acres (3.5 ha)
- Architect: Albert Kahn, C. Howard Crane, various
- NRHP reference No.: 08001106
- Added to NRHP: November 26, 2008

The Midtown Woodward Historic District is a historic district located along Woodward Avenue in Detroit, Michigan. Structures in the district are located between 2951 and 3424 Woodward Avenue, and include structures on the corner of Charlotte Street (14 Charlotte Street) and Peterboro Street (10 and 25 Peterboro Street). The district was admitted to the National Register of Historic Places in 2008.

== Structures ==
The district spans two blocks along Woodward Avenue in Midtown Detroit. Significant structures in the district include a number of architect-designed buildings. Some of these are:

=== Addison Hotel ===
The Addison Hotel, currently known as the Addison Apartments, is located at 14 Charlotte. The structure, designed by Albert Kahn, was built in 1905 and originally featured 50 luxury apartments that were later changed in the 1920s to accommodate 113 hotel rooms. The hotel originally had a large open penthouse used for gambling and serving liquor during the Prohibition, as well as a hidden tunnel leading to three adjacent store on Woodward Avenue used by the hotel owners as an escape tunnel during the Prohibition. The structure is currently being restored to feature 40 apartments.

=== Fine Arts Theatre ===
The Fine Arts Theatre is located at 2952 Woodward. The theatre, with 582 seats, was designed by C. Howard Crane. It opened in 1914 as the Addison, and closed in 1980.

=== Crystal Ballroom ===
The Crystal Ballroom is located at 3100 Woodward; the building is currently known as the Crystal Lofts and the current ground-floor tenant is Zacarro's Market. The ballroom was built in 1919. The facade of the original building was altered (likely in 1936 when Woodward Avenue was widened) to add the Art Deco elements apparent on the front. In 2005, the building was redeveloped with retail space on the ground floor and 16 residential units above on the second floor.

=== Kahn Print Shop ===
Albert Kahn designed this structure at 3408-3414 Woodward Avenue in 1912; it was built in 1919 as a print shop. After sitting vacant for decades, it has been redeveloped into retail space.

=== Bonstelle Theatre ===
Wayne State University's Bonstelle Theatre is located at 3424 Woodward at the north end of the district; it was originally the Temple Beth El. At the turn of the 20th century, Rabbi Leo M. Franklin of Detroit's Temple Beth El led the push for the construction of a new temple building. He hired architect Albert Kahn, a member of the congregation, to design the building. Groundbreaking began on November 25, 1901, with the ceremonial cornerstone laid on April 23, 1902. The first services were held in the chapel on January 24, 1903, and the formal dedication was held on September 18–19 of the same year.

=== Detroit Historical Museum ===
The museum is located at 5401 Woodward Avenue. It records the history of the Detroit area including the cobblestone streets, 19th Century stores, auto assembly line, toy trains, fur trading from the 18th Century, and more. In 2023, the Museum began hosting Black History Month events. The goal of the event was to inform the public about the accomplishments of Detroit's black entrepreneurs.

== Gallery ==
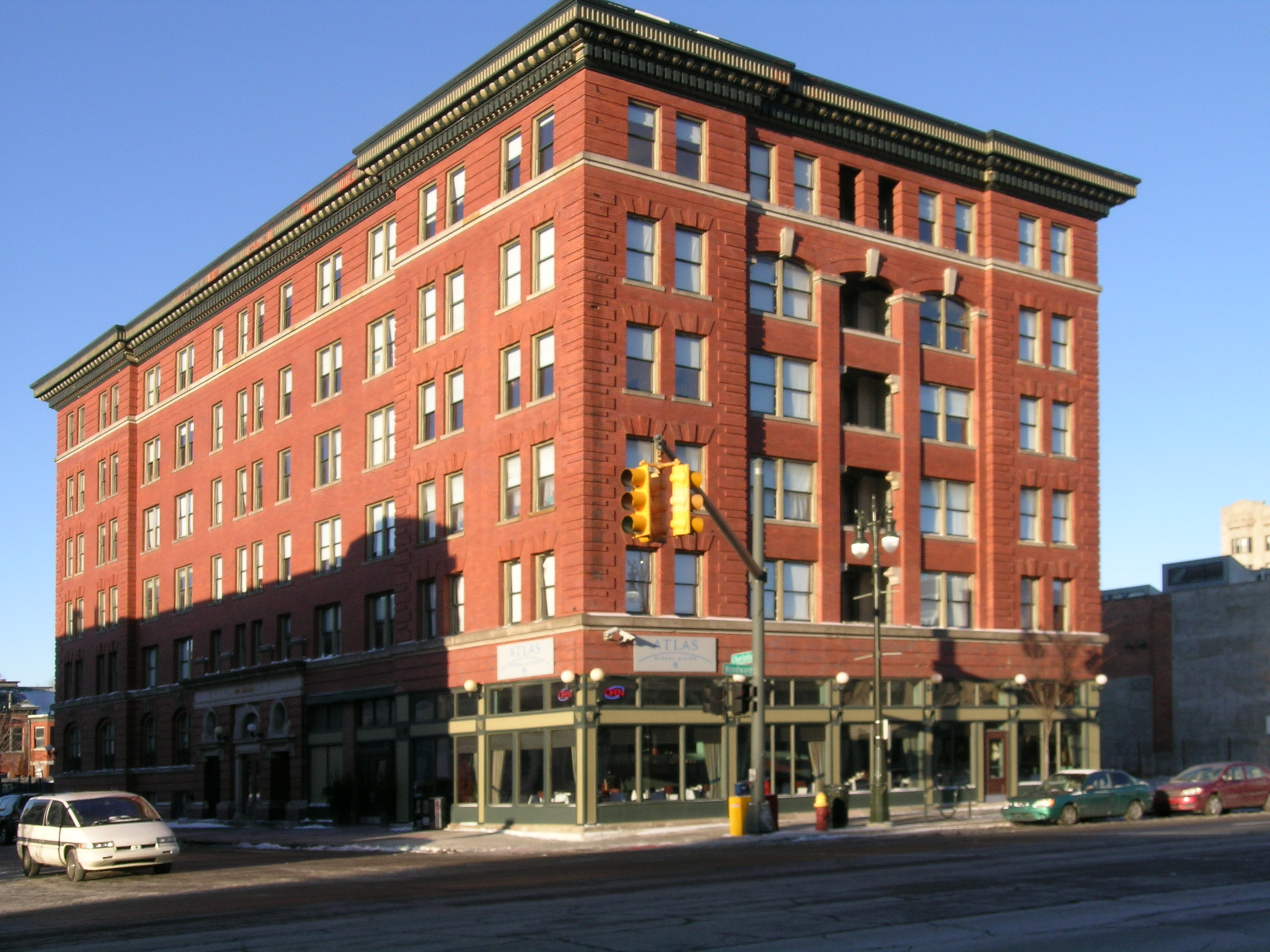
Addison Hotel

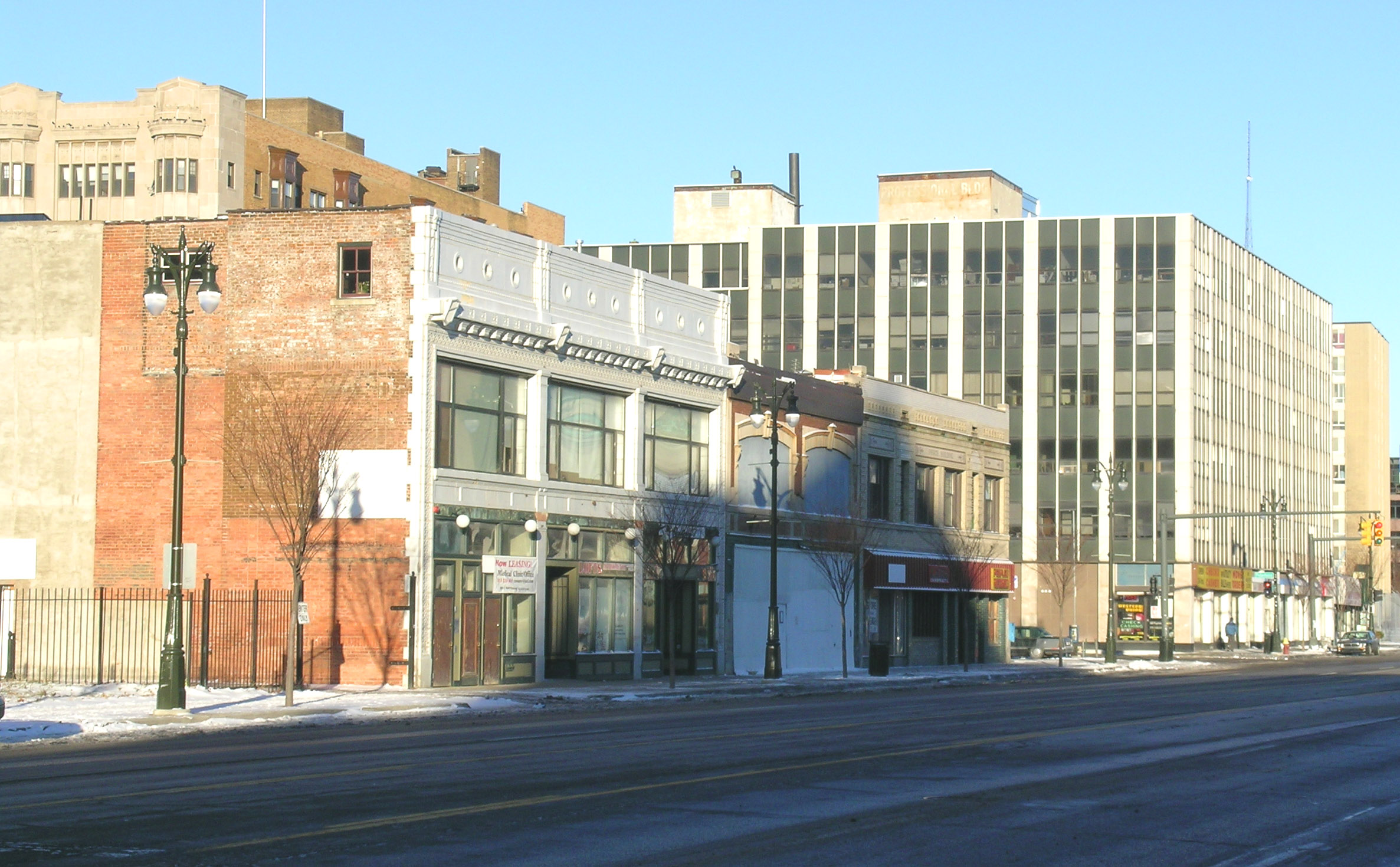
West side of Woodward

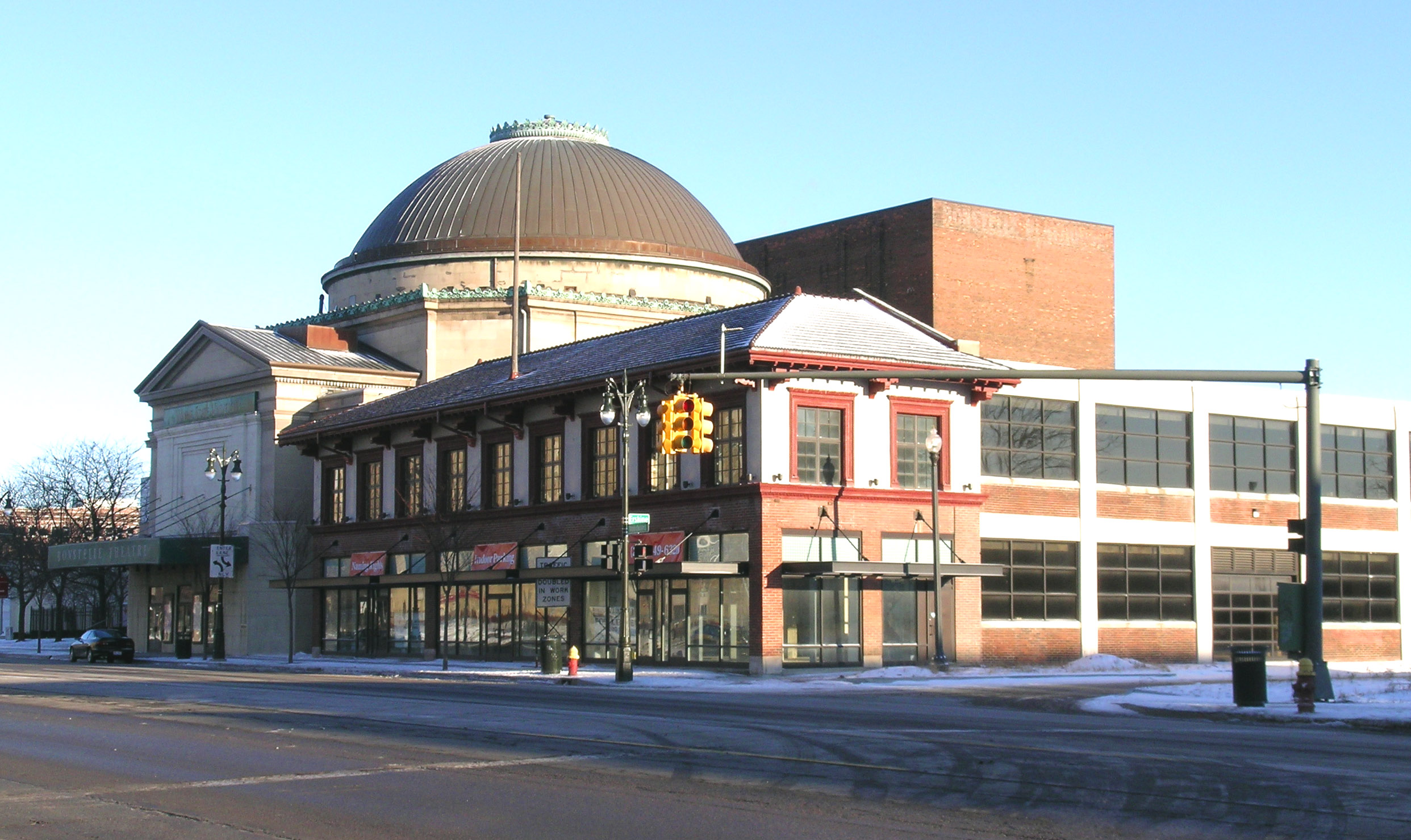
East side of Woodward (Temple Beth El and Kahn Print Shop)

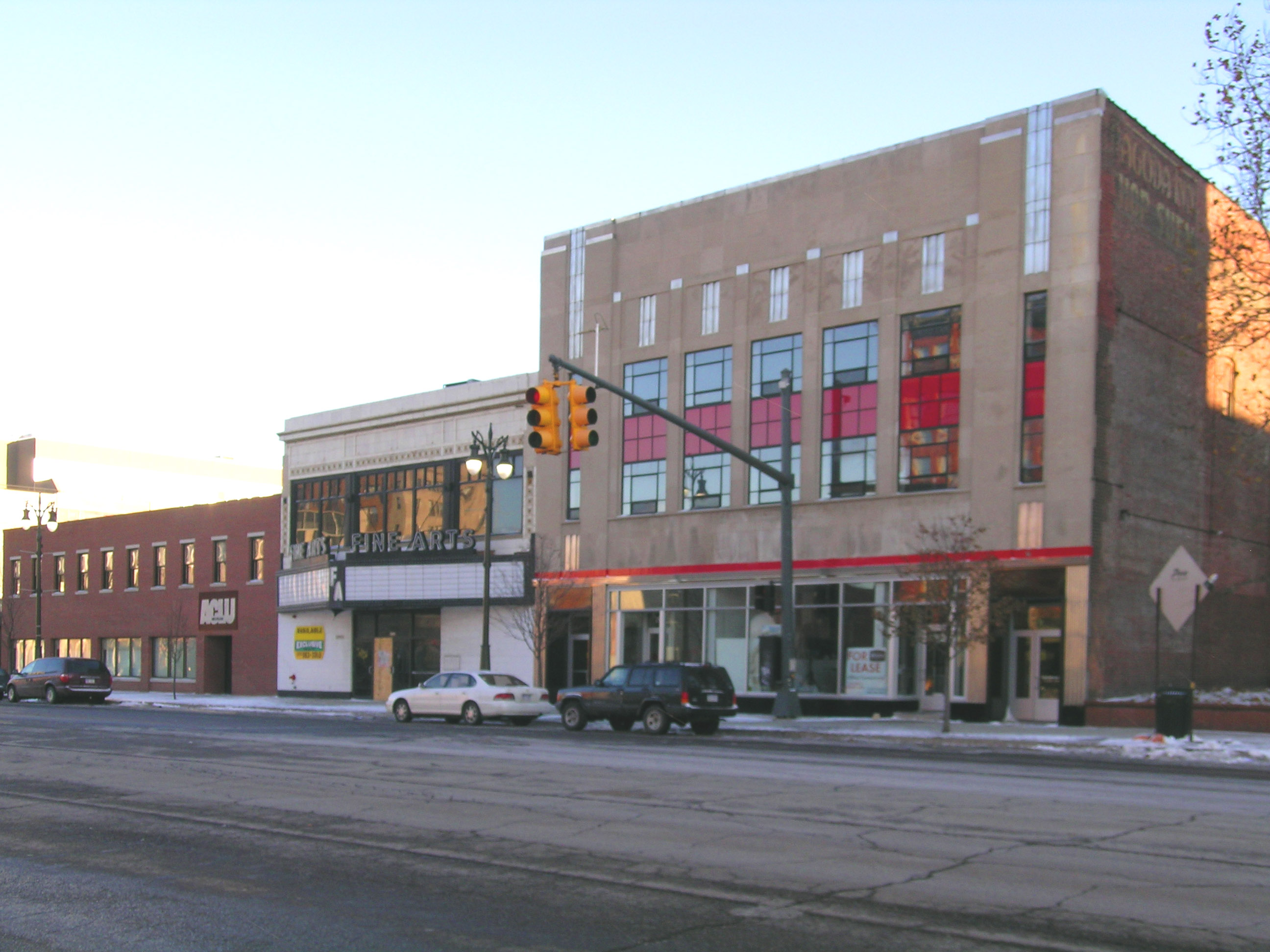
East side of Woodward (the Fine Arts Theatre is in the center)

== See also ==
- List of buildings located along Woodward Avenue, Detroit
- Lower Woodward Avenue Historic District
- Midtown Detroit
- Religious Structures of Woodward Avenue Thematic Resource
