= Bethel Community Transformation Center =

- Temple Beth-El
- U.S. National Register of Historic Places
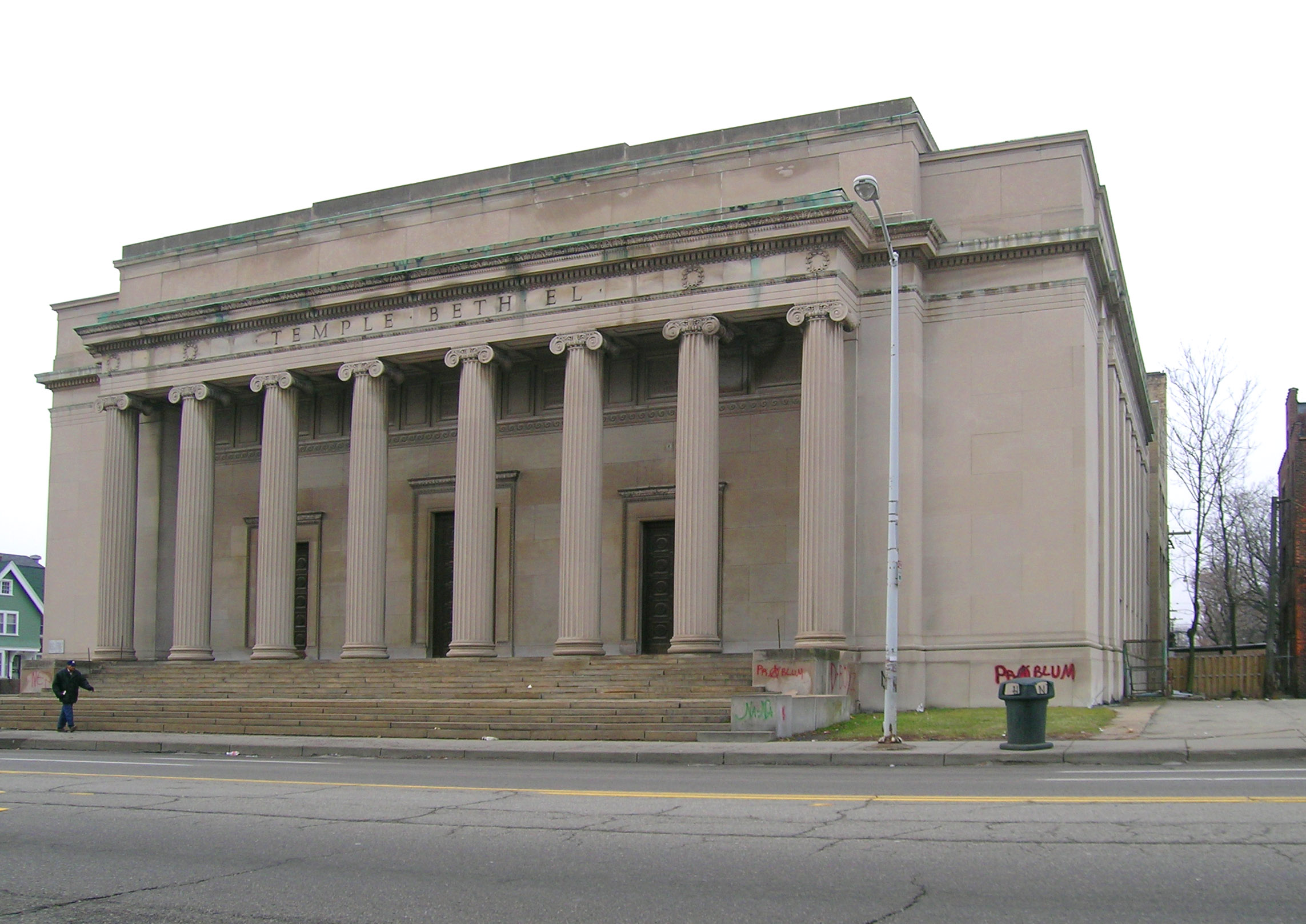
- Interactive map
- Location: 8801 Woodward Avenue; Detroit, Michigan
- Coordinates: 42°22′49.82″N 83°4′51.55″W
- Built: 1921
- Architect: Albert Kahn
- Architectural style: Neoclassical
- MPS: Religious Structures of Woodward Avenue TR
- NRHP reference No.: 82002912
- Added to NRHP: August 3, 1982

The former Temple Beth-El is a historic building located at 8801 Woodward Avenue (Woodward at Gladstone) in Detroit, Michigan. It was built in 1921 and listed on the National Register of Historic Places in 1982.

== Architecture ==
In 1921 Detroit's Temple Beth El, under Rabbi Leo M. Franklin's leadership, had outgrown its previous building at Woodward and Eliot. In addition, many members of the congregation had moved to areas such as Boston-Edison and Atkinson Avenue that did not proscribe Jewish residents. The congregation obtained a parcel of land near these neighborhoods at Woodward and Gladstone and engaged congregant Albert Kahn to design a new temple. The cornerstone for the new building was laid on September 20, 1921, with the dedication on November 10–12, 1922.

The Kahn-designed temple is a classical, flat-roofed structure built from limestone. On the facade facing Woodward, eight ionic columns form an enormous porch and frame three large pairs of doors. Along the facade facing Gladstone, eight tall, narrow are framed by massive piers.

== History ==
In early 1974, the Beth El congregation moved again, this time to Bloomfield Hills, and the building was sold to the Lighthouse Tabernacle, becoming known as the Lighthouse Cathedral. Little Rock Baptist Church owned the building from 2008 until 2014 and used it as a community center. In 2008, it was occupied by the Citadel of Faith Covenant Church. In June 2010, the church became occupied by The Community Church of Christ, under the leadership of Pastor R.A. Cranford. In October 2013, Breakers Covenant Church International began leasing space for their worship services under the leadership of Pastor Aramis D. Hinds Sr. As of October 2014, Breakers Covenant Church International is now the new owner of this property.

As of 2017 the Detroit Beth El building is now known as the Bethel Community Transformation Center, owned by a multiracial and multireligious board of trustees which plans to make the building a theater, multi-religion center, and community center.

== Murals ==
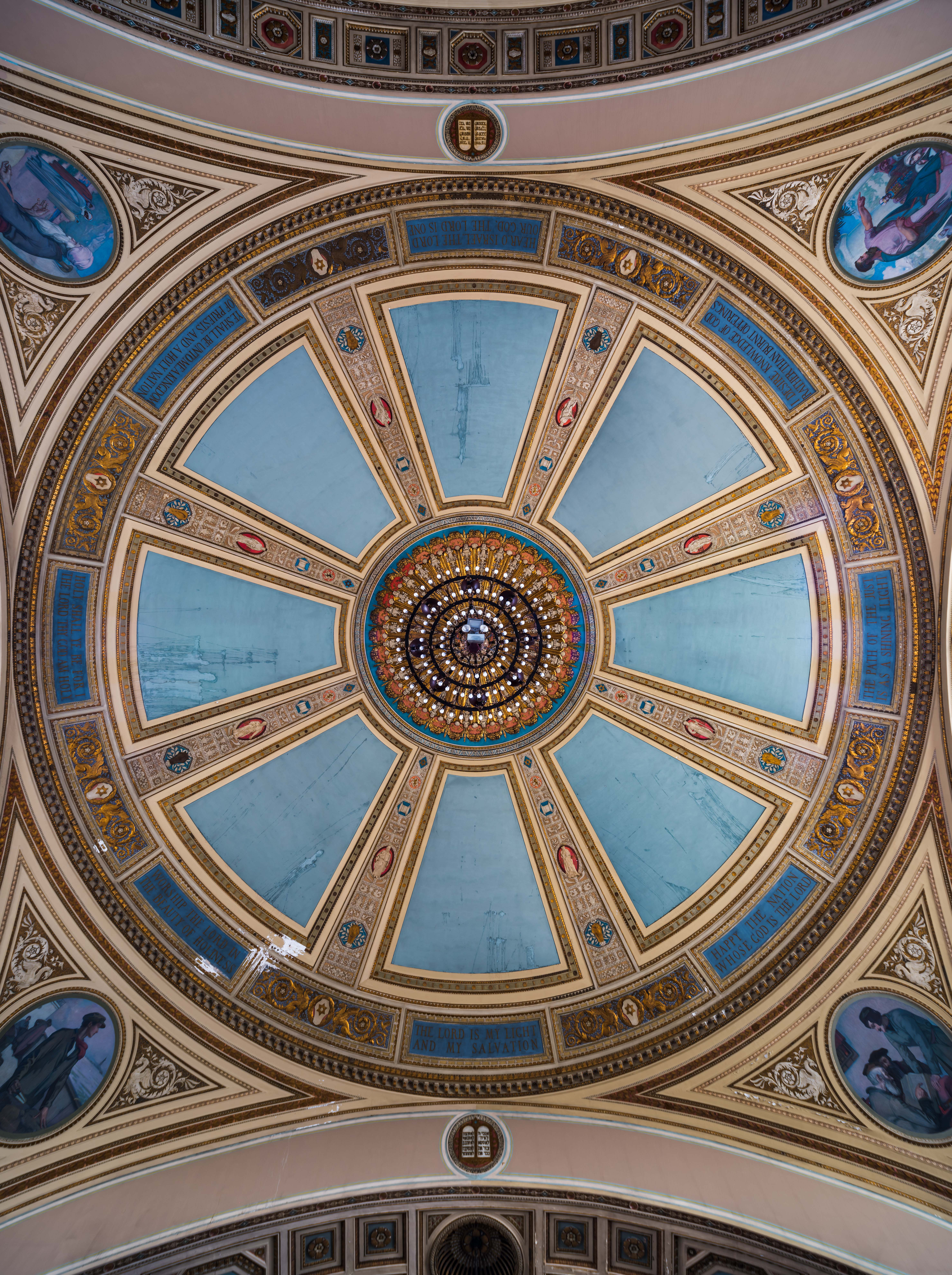

Four murals were dedicated in the Beth El Temple in 1925 and still survive today, each measuring 8 feet 3 inches in diameter.

The paintings were done by artist Myron Barlow, who got his start in art in Detroit, and became an expatriate artist in France. Barlow maintained his ties to Detroit. It was mentioned that he looked at the work of Giovanni Battista Tiepolo in France, and he himself painted ceilings in Paris. Barlow's four paintings were painted on canvas in France and then brought to the United States by him, to be installed in the temple.

The four paintings were written about in The Advocate in 1925. They include The Patriarch in which Abraham welcomes three strangers, The Prophet in which 11 figures react to the words of a prophet, a painting of older European Jews from the middle ages teaching the young, and The Immigrant depicting an immigrant with prayer book passing the Statue of Liberty.

Barlow had a family connection to the temple. In his mother's obituary, Beth El temple was listed as the one she attended, although she didn't live to see the paintings because she died in 1910.

=== Murals in the Bethel Community Transformation Center in Detroit, painted by Myron Barlow ===
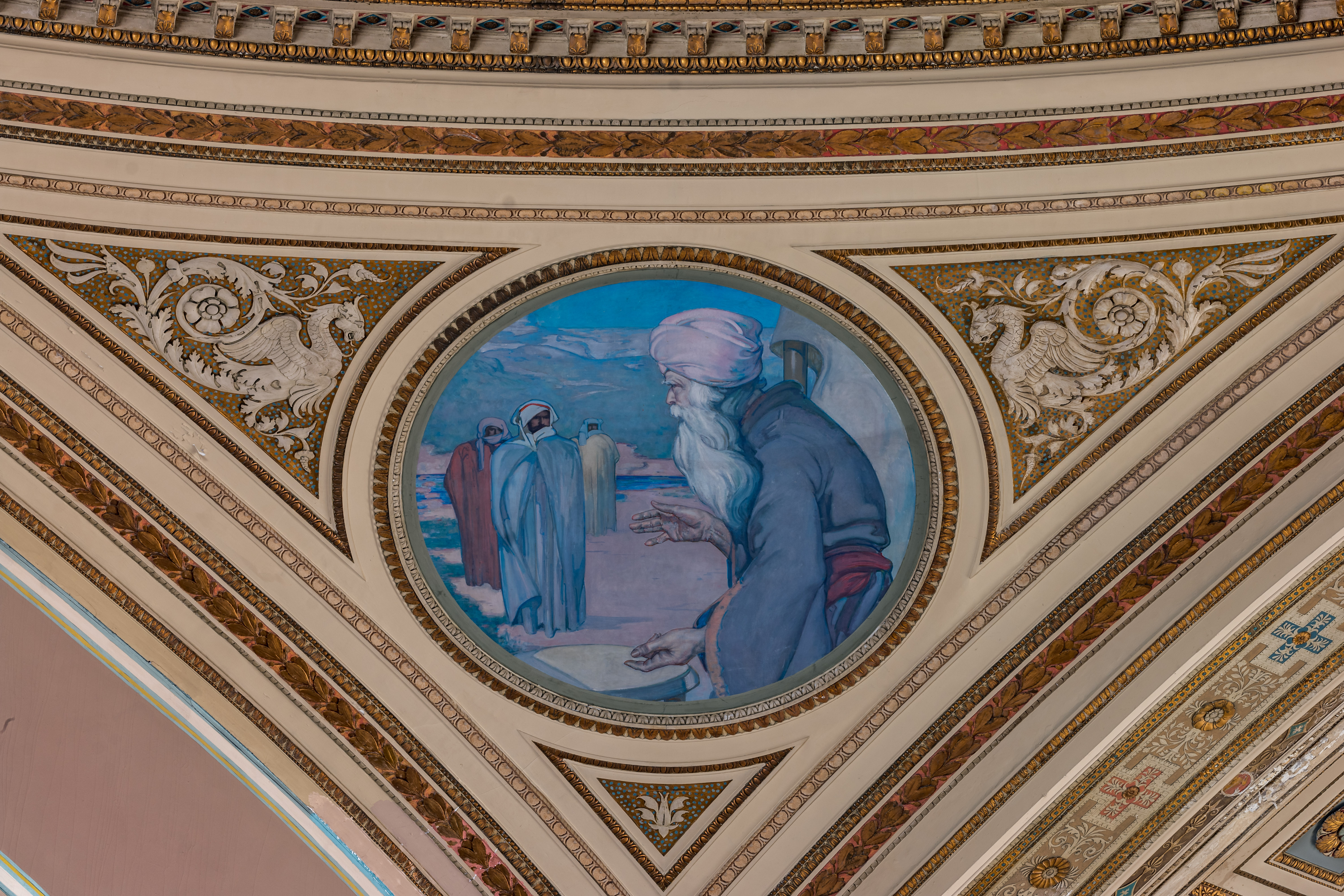
The Patriarch depicting Abraham

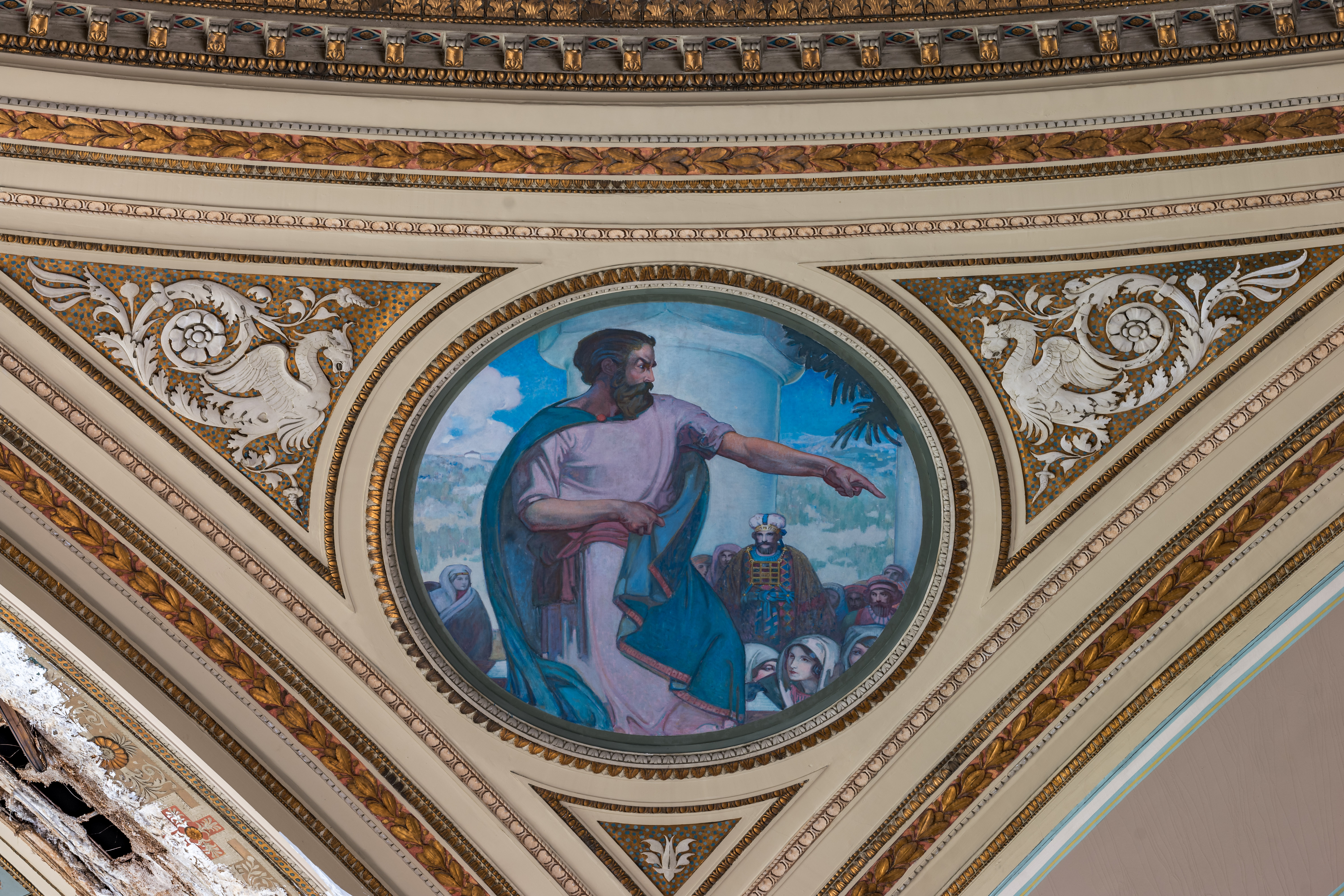
The Prophet

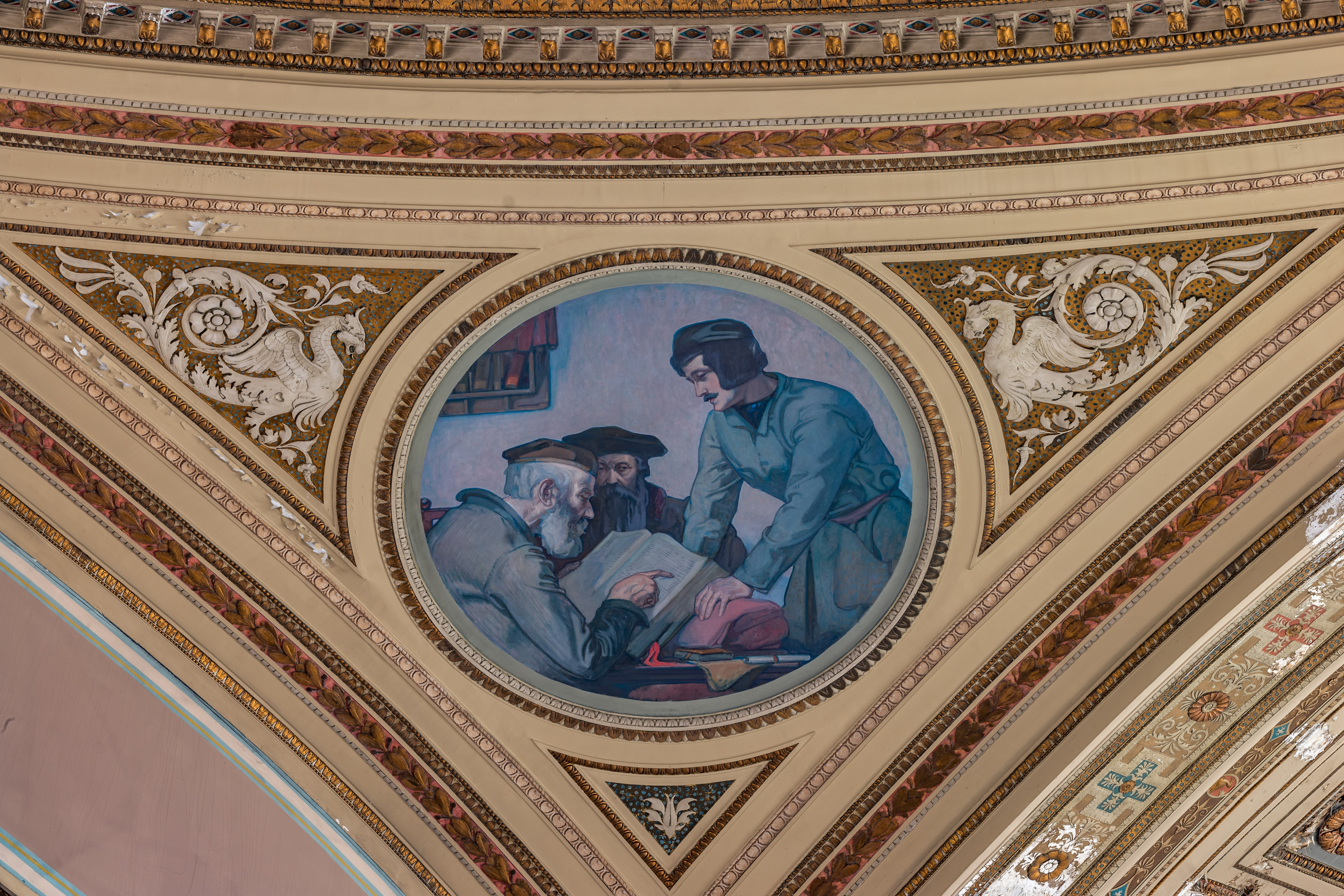
European Jews teaching during middle ages

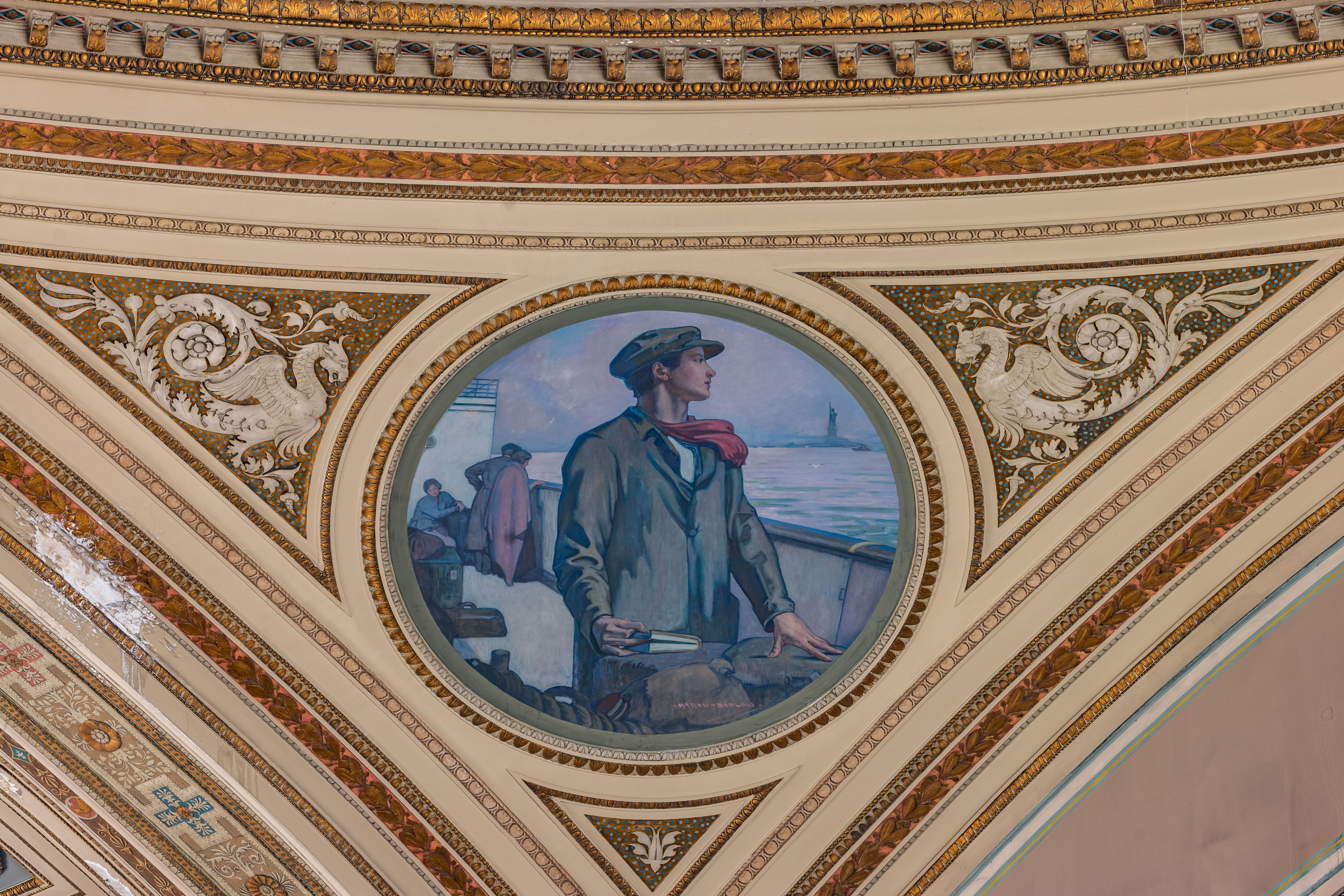
The Immigrant
