= Bonstelle Theatre =

United States historic place in Detroit, Michigan

- Temple Beth-El
- U.S. National Register of Historic Places
- U.S. Historic district – Contributing property
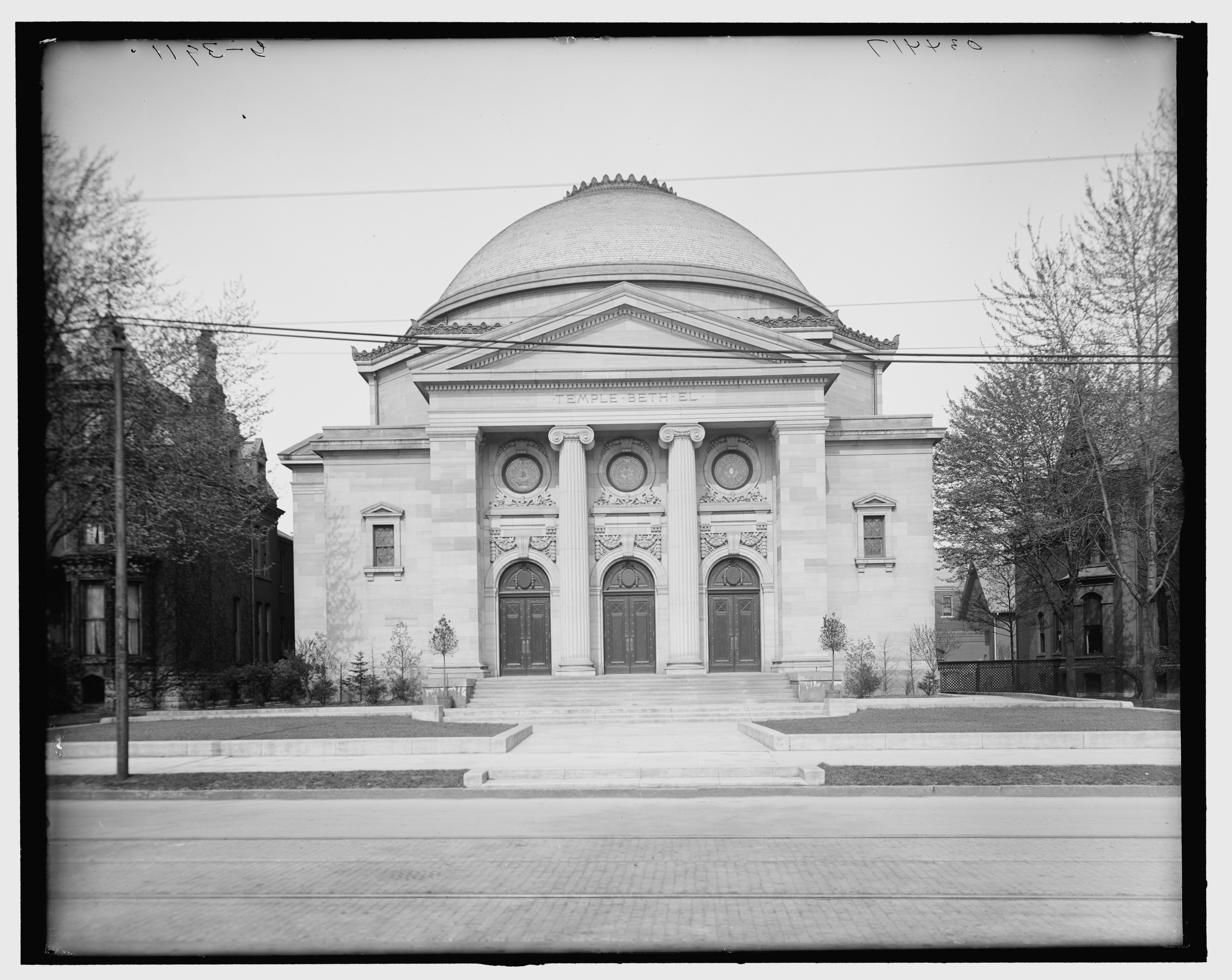
- The theater as Temple Beth-El in 1905; this facade was restored in 2025
- Interactive map
- Location: 3424 Woodward Avenue; Detroit, Michigan
- Coordinates: 42°20′45.92″N 83°3′24.86″W
- Built: 1902
- Architect: Albert Kahn; C. Howard Crane
- Architectural style: Beaux-Arts
- Part of: Midtown Woodward Historic District (ID08001106)
- MPS: Religious Structures of Woodward Ave. TR
- NRHP reference No.: 82002911

Significant dates
- Added to NRHP: August 3, 1982
- Designated CP: November 26, 2008

The Bonstelle Theatre is an events space and former synagogue located in the Midtown Woodward Historic District of Detroit, Michigan. It was built in 1902 as the Temple Beth-El, a synagogue serving the eponymous reform Jewish congregation, by Albert Kahn. After the construction of a new synagogue in 1922, the building became a theater, which was eventually sold to Wayne State University, which occupied it until 2020. After a thorough renovation, the building was converted to an multi-use event space attached to a new AC Hotel in 2025. The building, as Temple Beth-El, was listed on the National Register of Historic Places in 1982.

== Construction ==
When Rabbi Leo M. Franklin first began leading services at Detroit's Temple Beth El in 1899, he felt that the construction of a new temple building on Detroit's "Piety Row" stretch of Woodward would increase the visibility and prestige of Detroit's Jewish community. Accordingly, in October 1900, the congregation held a special meeting at which it was decided to build a new temple. The congregation purchased a site for the new temple in April of the next year and engaged member Albert Kahn to design the structure. Groundbreaking took place on November 25, 1901, with the ceremonial cornerstone laid on April 23, 1902. The first services were held in the chapel on January 24, 1903, and the formal dedication was held on September 18–19 of the same year.

== Building ==
The temple is a Beaux-Arts structure influenced primarily by Roman and Greek temples. Architect Albert Kahn's exterior design for Temple Beth-El has been compared closely to the Pantheon in Rome. There is a prominent dome over the main area of the temple, with gabled wings on the north and south. A pedimented extension on the front once extended into a porch; the front section of the building was lost when the city widened Woodward Avenue in 1936.

== Later use ==
When the Temple Beth El congregation constructed a new building farther north along Woodward in 1922, they sold the building at Woodward and Eliot to Jessie Bonstelle for $500,000. Bonstelle hired architect C. Howard Crane to convert the building into a theater, and named the resulting building the Bonstelle Playhouse. Myron G. Barlow was reported to be responsible for directing interior decoration in "Italian style." In 1928, the Bonstelle Playhouse became the Detroit Civic Theatre, and in the 1930s, the Mayfair Motion Picture Theater. In 1951, Wayne State University rented the facility as a performance space for its theater company, and purchased it outright in 1956, renaming it the Bonstelle Theatre in honor of Jessie Bonstelle.

In 2019, the University reached an agreement to lease the theatre to Detroit-based development firm The Roxbury Group. The Bonstelle was expected to host Mary Poppins as its final performance in April 2020, which was cancelled due to the COVID-19 pandemic. As a result, the final performance by Wayne State University in the Bonstelle was A Christmas Carol in December 2019. Wayne State University's theater performances are now produced and performed at the newly constructed Hilberry Gateway. The Bonstelle was renovated and integrated into an adjacent hotel by AC Hotels, which opened in 2025. The renovation resulted in the removal of the theater-era facade, and the restoration of Kahn's original synagogue facade. The original synagogue-theater space is now an events venue owned by and connected to the hotel.

== Gallery ==
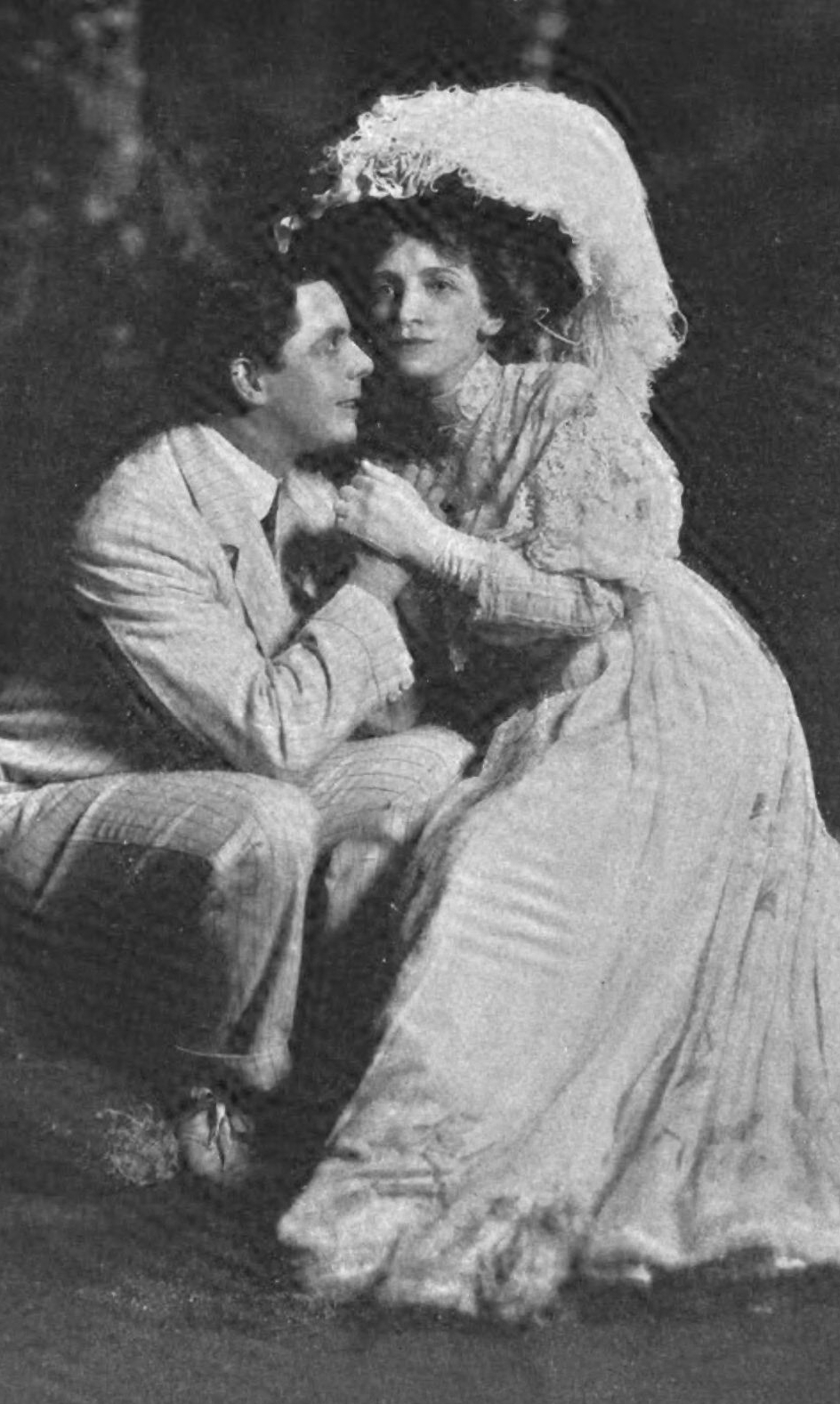
Jessie Bonstelle in 1908

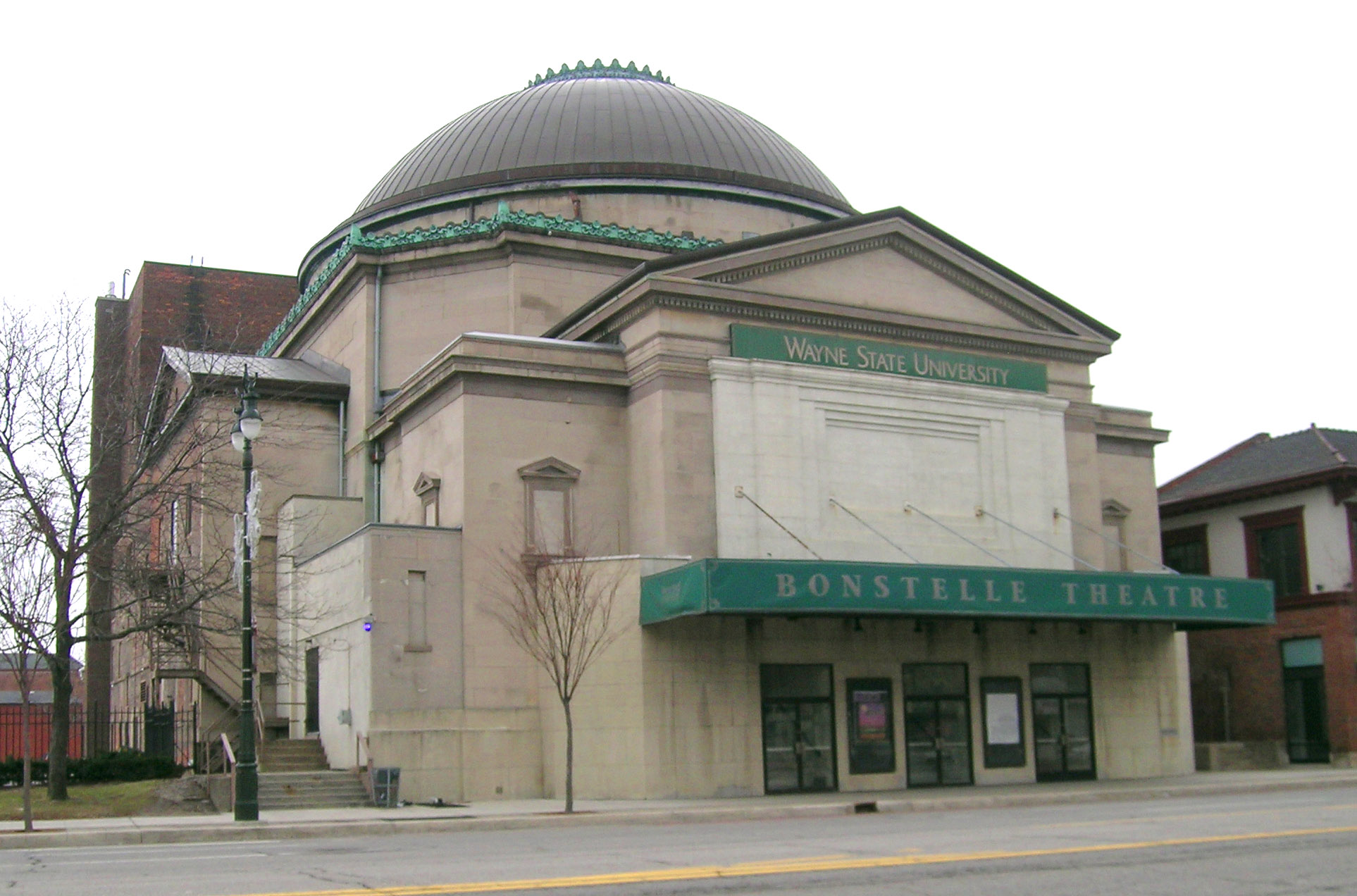
The Bonstelle Theatre in 2008

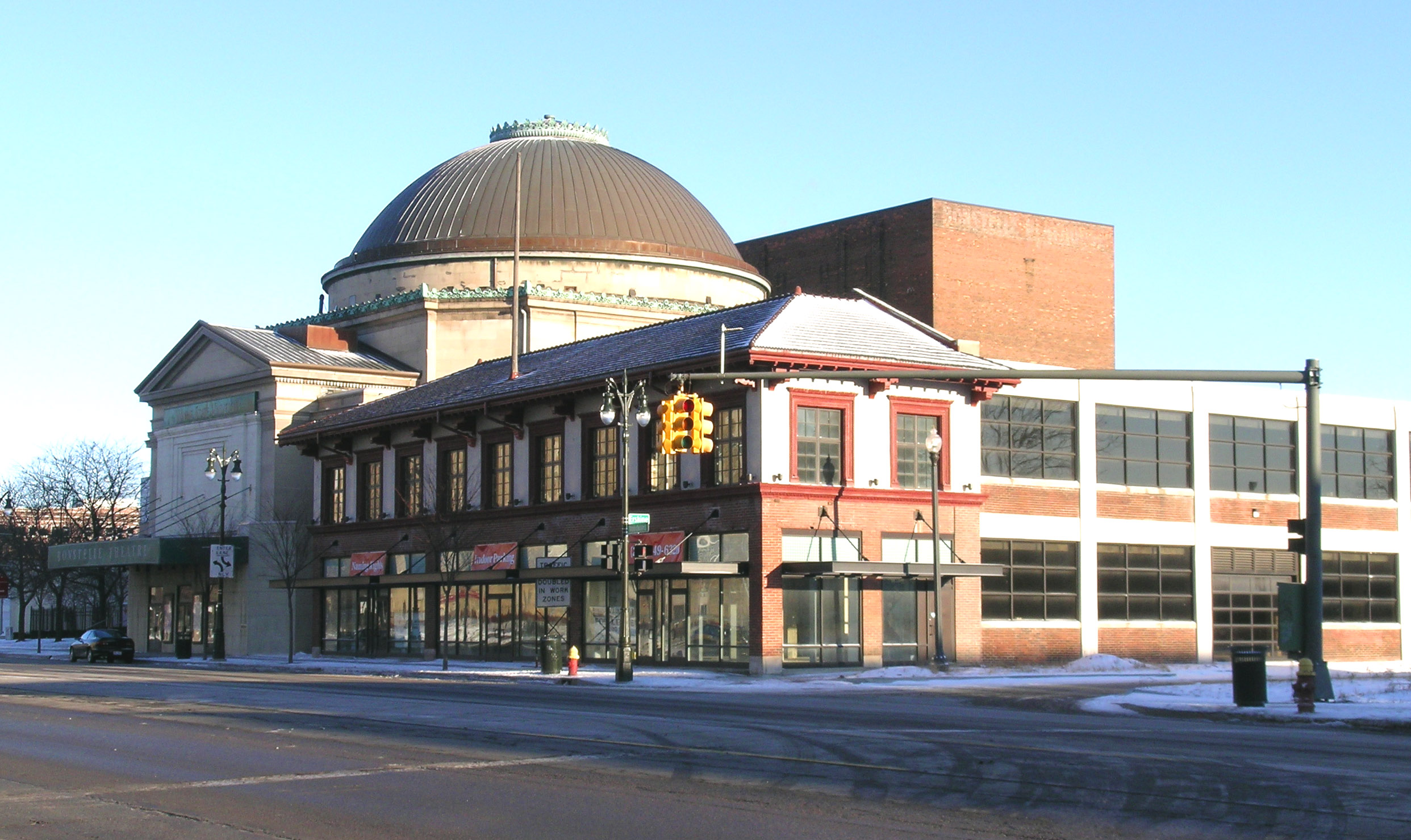
The Bonstelle viewed from the south in 2008

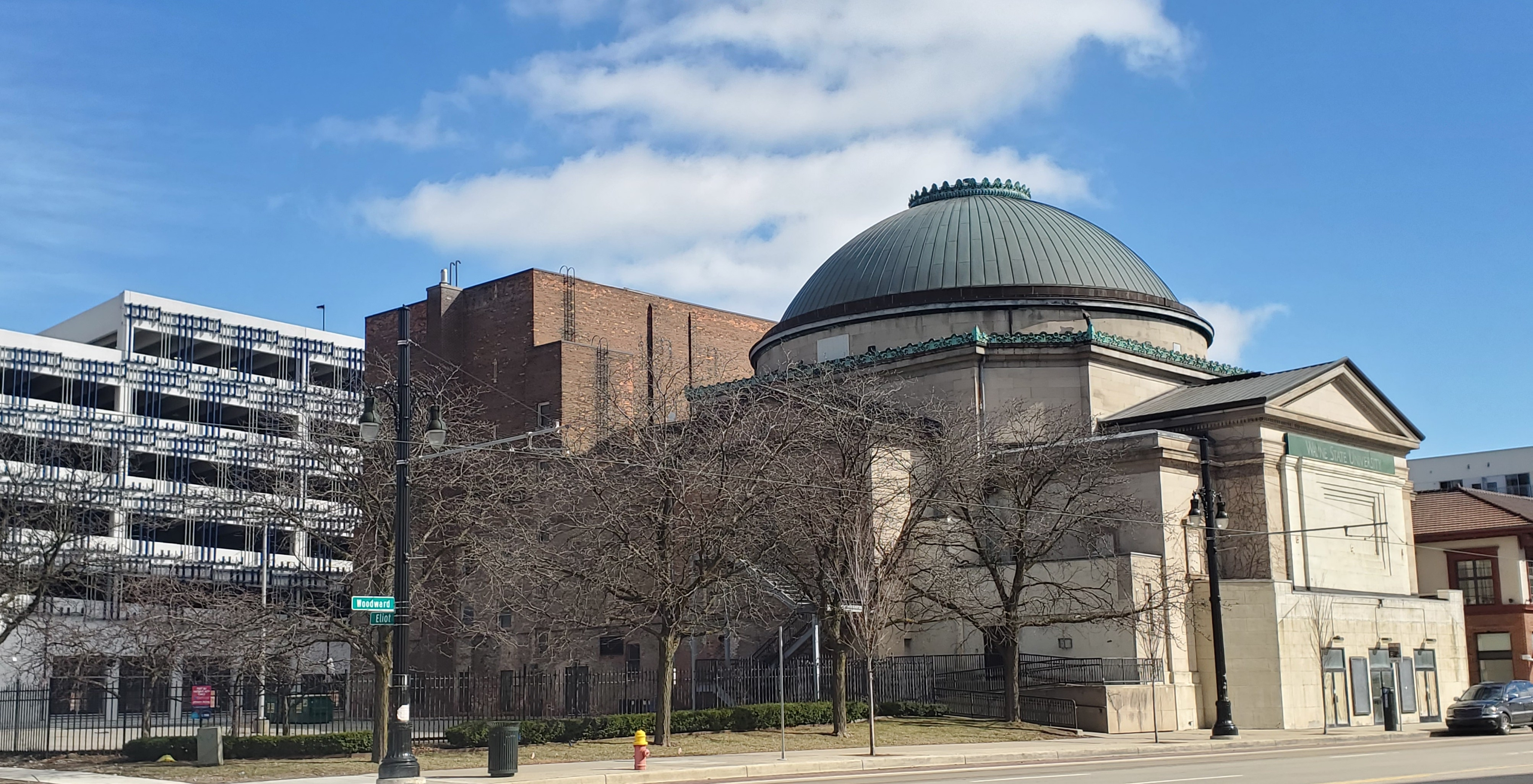
The Bonstelle in 2023, after its closure, with the site of the future hotel to the left

== See also ==
- History of the Jews in Metro Detroit
