= Temple Beth El (Detroit) =

Reform synagogue in Michigan, United States

Temple Beth-El
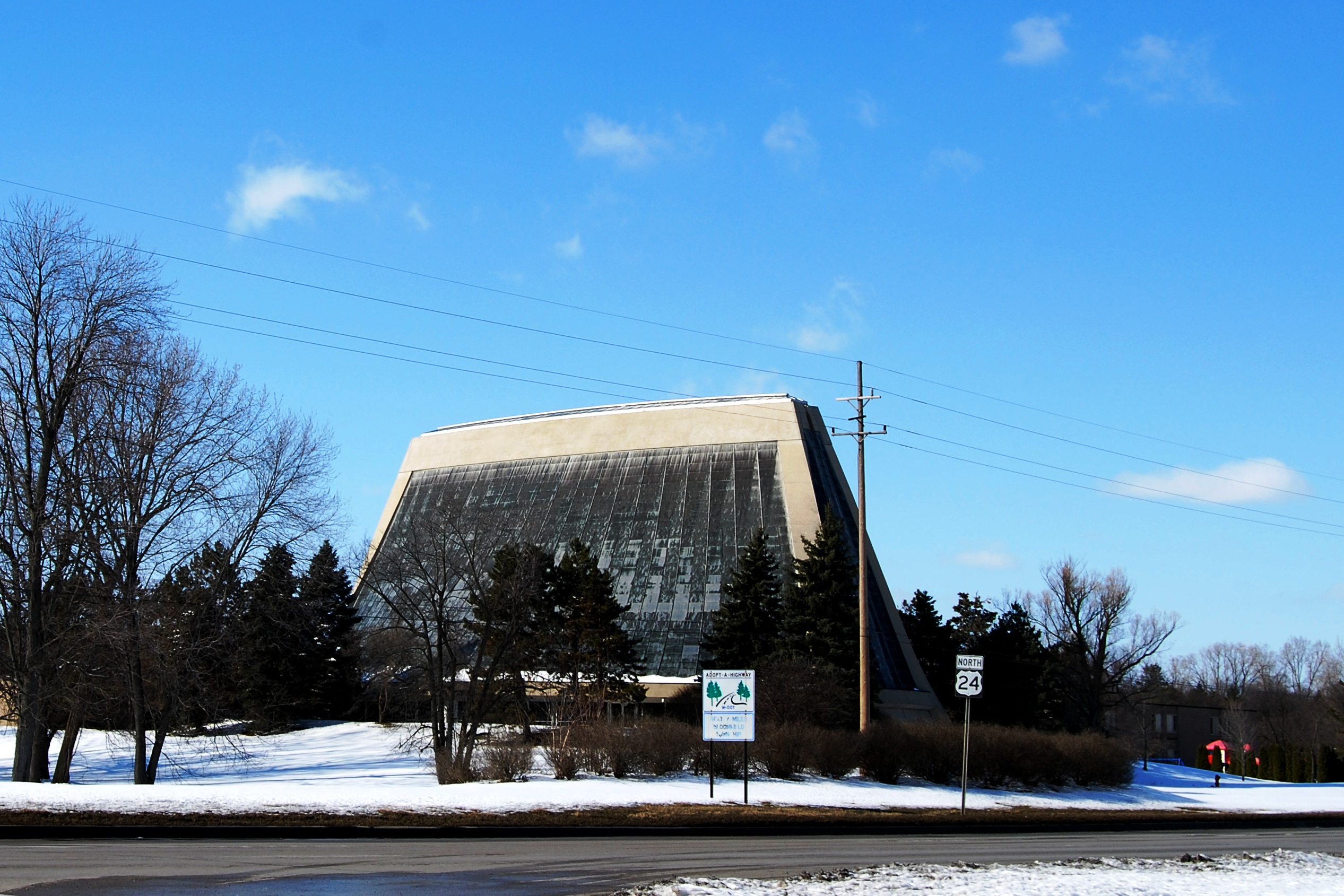
- The 1973 synagogue building, in 2008

- Location in Michigan

Religion
- Affiliation: Reform Judaism
- Ecclesiastical or organizational status: Synagogue
- Leadership: Rabbi Mark Miller; Rabbi Megan Brudney (Associate)
- Status: Active

Location
- Location: 7400 Telegraph Road, Bloomfield Township, Oakland County, Michigan 48301
- Country: United States
- Interactive map of Temple Beth-El
- Coordinates: 42°31′54″N 83°17′10″W

Architecture
- Architects: Albert Kahn (1902 and 1922); Minoru Yamasaki (1973)
- Type: Synagogue
- Style: Beaux-Arts (1902); Neoclassical (1922); Modernist (1973)
- Established: 1850 (as a congregation)
- Completed: 1867 (Washington Boulevard); 1902 (3424 Woodward Avenue); 1922 (8801 Woodward Avenue); 1973 (Telegraph Road)

Website
- tbeonline.org
- Temple Beth-El (1902)
- U.S. National Register of Historic Places
- U.S. Historic district – Contributing property
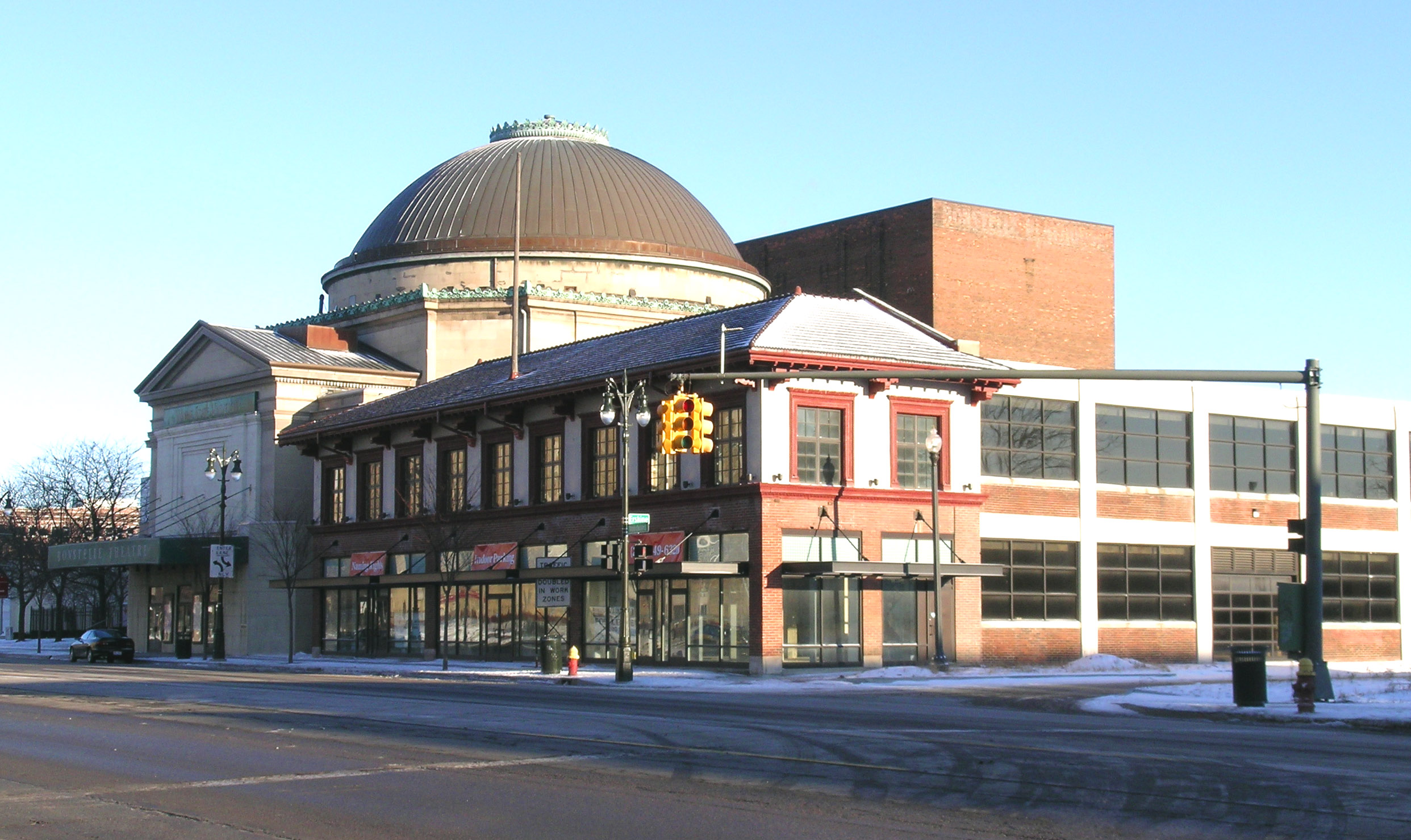
- 1902 former synagogue
- Interactive map
- Location: 3424 Woodward Avenue, Detroit, Michigan
- Coordinates: 42°20′45.92″N 83°3′24.86″W
- Built: 1902
- Architect: Albert Kahn; C. Howard Crane
- Architectural style: Beaux-Arts
- Part of: Midtown Woodward Historic District (ID08001106)
- MPS: Religious Structures of Woodward Ave. TR
- NRHP reference No.: 82002911

Significant dates
- Added to NRHP: August 3, 1982
- Designated CP: November 26, 2008
- Temple Beth-El (1922)
- U.S. National Register of Historic Places
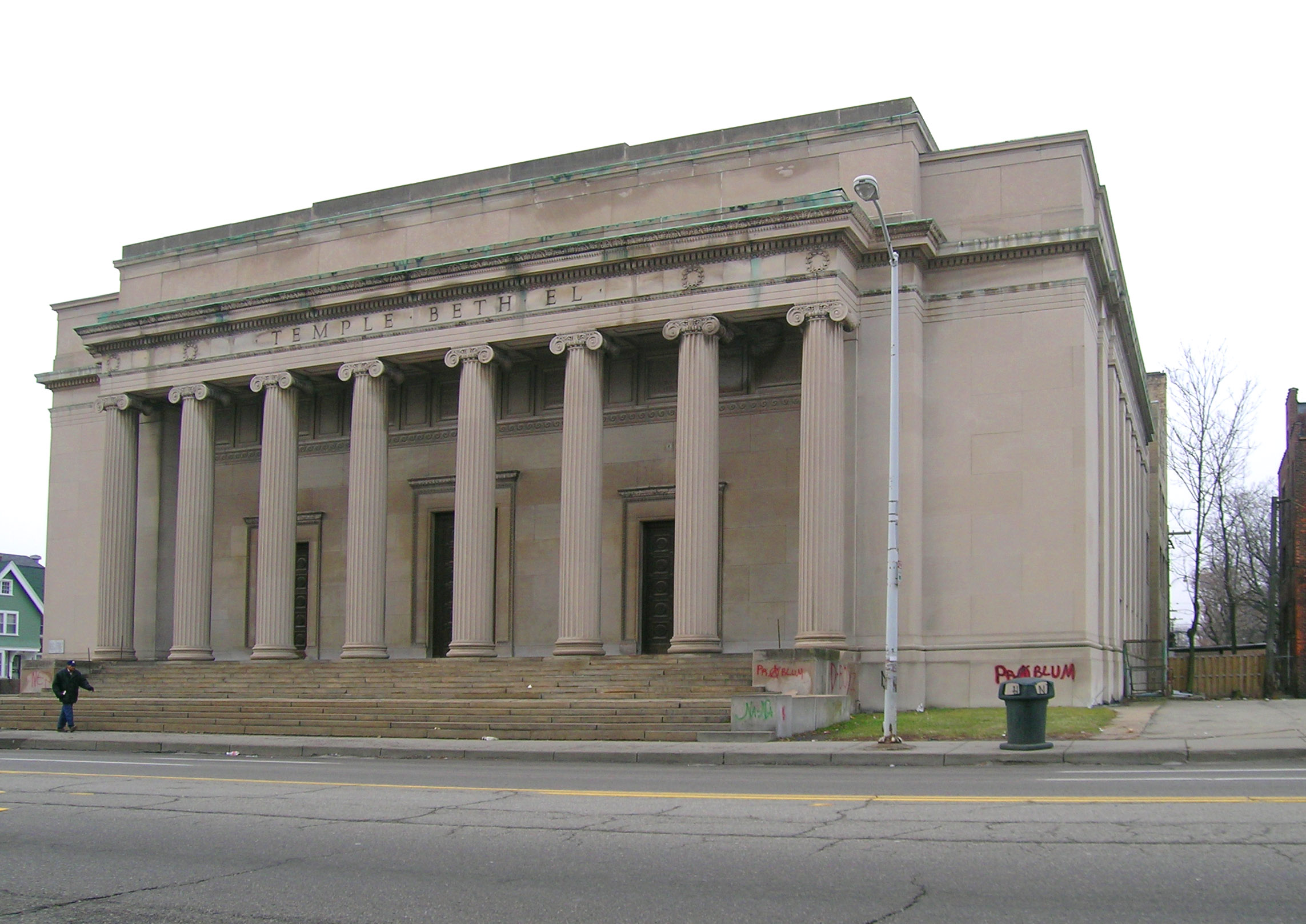
- 1922 former synagogue
- Interactive map
- Location: 8801 Woodward Avenue, Detroit, Michigan
- Coordinates: 42°22′49.82″N 83°4′51.55″W
- Built: 1921-1922
- Architect: Albert Kahn
- Architectural style: Neoclassical
- MPS: Religious Structures of Woodward Avenue TR
- NRHP reference No.: 82002912
- Added to NRHP: August 3, 1982

Temple Beth El is a Reform synagogue located in Bloomfield Township, Oakland County, Michigan, United States. Beth El was founded in 1850 in the city of Detroit, and is the oldest Jewish congregation in Michigan. Temple Beth El was a founding member of the Union for Reform Judaism (originally the Union of American Hebrew Congregations) in 1873, and hosted the meeting in 1889 during which the Central Conference of American Rabbis was established.

In 1982, its two former buildings in Detroit, at 3424 and 8801 Woodward Avenue, were listed on the National Register of Historic Places.

== Early years ==
In 1850, Sarah and Isaac Cozens arrived in Detroit and moved into a house near the corner of Congress and St. Antoine streets. At the time, there were only 60 Jews in Detroit (out of a population of over 21,000) and no synagogues. Sarah urged her co-religionists to establish a congregation, and on September 22, 1850, twelve Jewish families came together at the Cozens's home to found the "Beth El Society", commemorated by a Michigan Historical Marker at this site. The congregation engaged the services of Rabbi Samuel Marcus of New York.

Rabbi Marcus conducted services in the Orthodox mode, first in the Cozens's home and later in a room above a store on Jefferson Avenue. In 1851, the congregation legally incorporated, and adopted its first constitution the following year. In 1854, Rabbi Marcus died of cholera, and the congregation chose Rabbi Leibman Adler, the father of Chicago School architect, Dankmar Adler, as his successor. Rabbi Adler fostered the temple's involvement the Underground Railroad. Fanny Butzel Heineman, Emil S. Heineman, and Mark Sloman were among the people who helped freedom seekers who crossed the Detroit River into Windsor, Ontario from 1854 to 1861.

In 1856, the congregation adopted a new set of by-laws including a number of innovations from the then-emerging Reform Judaism. Although the congregation was slowly growing, due in part to the influx of Jews to Detroit, some members of the congregation were unhappy with the reforms. In 1860, the new by-laws were debated and re-affirmed. However, the introduction of music into the worship service in 1861 caused a split, with 17 of the more Orthodox members of the congregation leaving to form Congregation Shaarey Zedek. The remaining congregants adopted another set of by-laws in 1862, introducing greater reforms.

Temple Beth El was one of the thirty-four congregations involved in the founding of the Union of American Hebrew Congregations in 1873, and immediately became officially affiliated with the organization. In 1889, Beth El hosted the Eleventh Council of the Union of American Hebrew Congregations, at which the Central Conference of American Rabbis was founded.

In 1861, the congregation moved into a new temple on Rivard Street. In 1867, it purchased a spacious building on Washington Boulevard and Clifford Street, where services were held until 1903. A number of rabbis served at Beth El, none remained for long until Louis Grossmann, the tenth rabbi, arrived in 1884, immediately after his graduation from Hebrew Union College. Grossmann was the first American-born rabbi of Beth El, and he organized a number of reforms, including the adoption of the Union Prayer Book.

== Leo M. Franklin years ==
Rabbi Grossmann resigned in 1898, and the congregation hired Leo M. Franklin, a young Rabbi from Omaha and another Hebrew Union graduate. The choice proved fortuitous, as Franklin served the congregation for over forty years. Franklin organized the United Jewish Charities (an umbrella organization to coordinate philanthropic activities), began the Woman's Auxiliary Association (later the Sisterhood of Temple Beth El), and assumed editorship of the Jewish American, Detroit's first English-Jewish weekly. He also instituted an interdenominational community Thanksgiving service and established a student congregation (the forerunner of the Hillel Society) at the University of Michigan.

Under Franklin's leadership, Temple Beth El grew rapidly. In 1902, the congregation authorized a new building on Woodward Avenue near Eliot Street. The building was designed by the young (and then relatively unknown) Beth El congregant Albert Kahn. Beth El used this building until 1922 when it was sold for use as a theater and remodeled by architect C. Howard Crane. It currently houses Wayne State University's Bonstelle Theatre. In 1922, the congregation of over 800 families moved to another Albert Kahn structure at Woodward and Gladstone. The building currently houses the Bethel Community Transformation Center.

== Later years ==
Rabbi Franklin retired in 1941 and was replaced by B. Benedict Glazer. After Glazer's untimely death in 1952, the congregation elected Richard C. Hertz as leader who served until 1982.

Once again, in 1973, the membership outgrew its facilities. With the movement of many of the congregants to the northern suburbs, Beth El built a new temple in Bloomfield Township at Telegraph and 14 Mile Roads. The facility was designed by Minoru Yamasaki.

== Present day ==
Temple Beth El currently has a membership of approximately 1,000 families and is led by Senior Rabbi Mark Miller, Associate Rabbi Megan Brudney, and Cantor Rachel Gottlieb Kalmowitz. The Temple remains at the forefront of current trends in Jewish worship and program, innovative lifelong education, and a commitment to interfaith relations and active work in the broader community.

== Architecture ==
Temple Beth El has been the congregation for two well-known architects. The first is Albert Kahn, who designed both the 1902 and 1922 temple buildings.

Minoru Yamasaki's firm designed the 1973 temple building. The firm also designed the ill-fated Pruitt-Igoe complex in St. Louis, Missouri, and the World Trade Center in New York City. According to the congregation, the World Trade Center towers and the Beth El temple were being designed at the same time, and the models for both were physically adjacent to each other while they were being refined and constructed. Yamasaki was said to have designed the current Temple Beth El in Bloomfield Hills to resemble a tent as early temporary Jewish Synagogues during the Jewish Exodus from Egypt were located in tents. The current Temple Beth El has many architectural features for which Yamasaki is known for; including poured concrete pillars, a natural skylight running the length of the building and large windows at ground level accommodating views of the surrounding natural landscape. Yamasaki has been credited for giving Latvian architect Gunnar Birkerts his start, which has resulted in numerous award-winning projects, many of which are around Ann Arbor, Michigan and Corning, New York.

== Notable members ==
- Dankmar Adler, architect and co-principal of Adler & Sullivan, a Chicago architectural firm
- Albert Kahn, architect who designed the 1902 and 1922 synagogues

== See also ==
- Bethel Community Transformation Center, 1922 former synagogue, now community center
- Bonstelle Theatre, 1902 former synagogue, now theater
- History of the Jews in Metro Detroit
