= Hilberry Gateway =

Performing arts center in Detroit, Michigan, U.S.

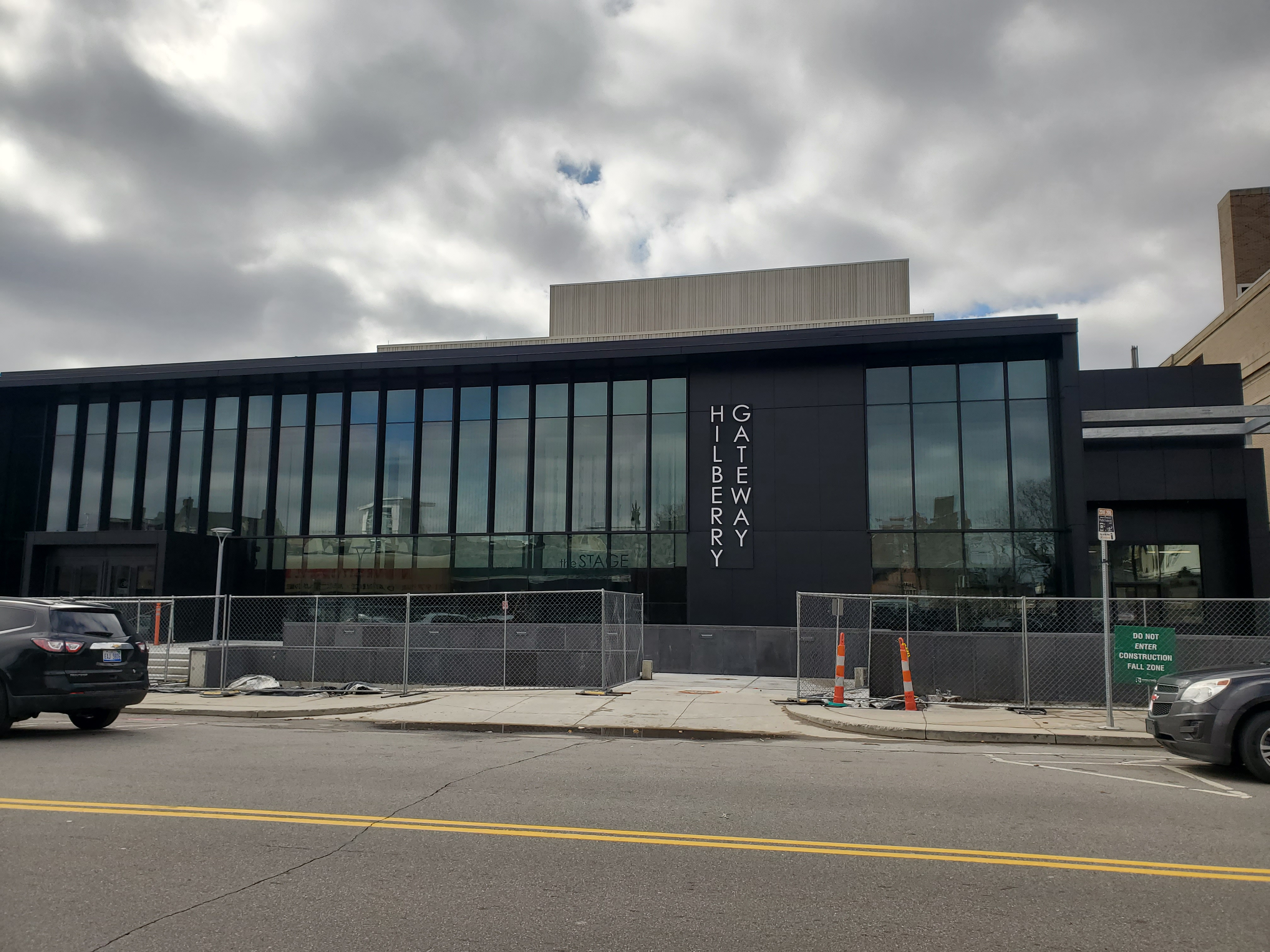
- Front view of the theater, during final stages of construction
- Interactive map of Hilberry Gateway
- Address: 4715 Cass Ave; Detroit, Michigan; United States
- Coordinates: 42°21′14″N 83°03′58″W
- Owner: Wayne State University
- Public transit: QLine Warren Avenue; DDOT 8, 16, 42; SMART FAST Woodward 461, 462

Construction
- Groundbreaking: 2018
- Opened: April 7, 2023

The Hilberry Gateway is a performing arts center on the campus of Wayne State University in Detroit, Michigan, United States. The complex is the home of theatre and jazz performances presented by the Maggie Allesee Department of Theatre and Dance, succeeding the Bonstelle Theatre and incorporating the renovated Hilberry Theatre.

The project was in planning as early as 2010 and received funding in 2018. The theater opened with the Maggie Allesee Department of Theatre and Dance production of Cabaret in April 2023.

== History ==
The Hilberry Gateway succeeds two earlier performance venues in Midtown Detroit, the Bonstelle Theatre and the Hilberry Theatre. Both venues were built as houses of worship in the early 20th century and converted to theaters decades later. Scenic and costume shops were located in a separate facility, complicating the logistics of productions in both theaters. The university also highlighted the Hilberry Theatre's uncomfortable seating and climate controls in its planning for the new performance venues.

Design work on the complex began in 2016. The university's Board of Governors approved $65 million in funding for the project in 2018 after over eight years of planning. The facility was initially expected to open in fall 2022.

== Performance spaces ==
=== Proscenium theater ===
The 550-seat proscenium theater features a 3,200 ft^{2} (297 m^{2}) stage, with a sprung floor for dance performances, and an orchestra lift for musicals. The theater opened in April 2023 with a production of Cabaret.

=== Studio Theater ===
The 250-seat, 50 by 60 ft (15 by 18 m) black box theater is the most flexible performance space in the complex. The space features a tension grid for flexibility in configuring overhead equipment.

The Studio Theater opened in May 2023 with the Sarah Ruhl adaptation of Orlando.

=== Gretchen C. Valade Jazz Center ===
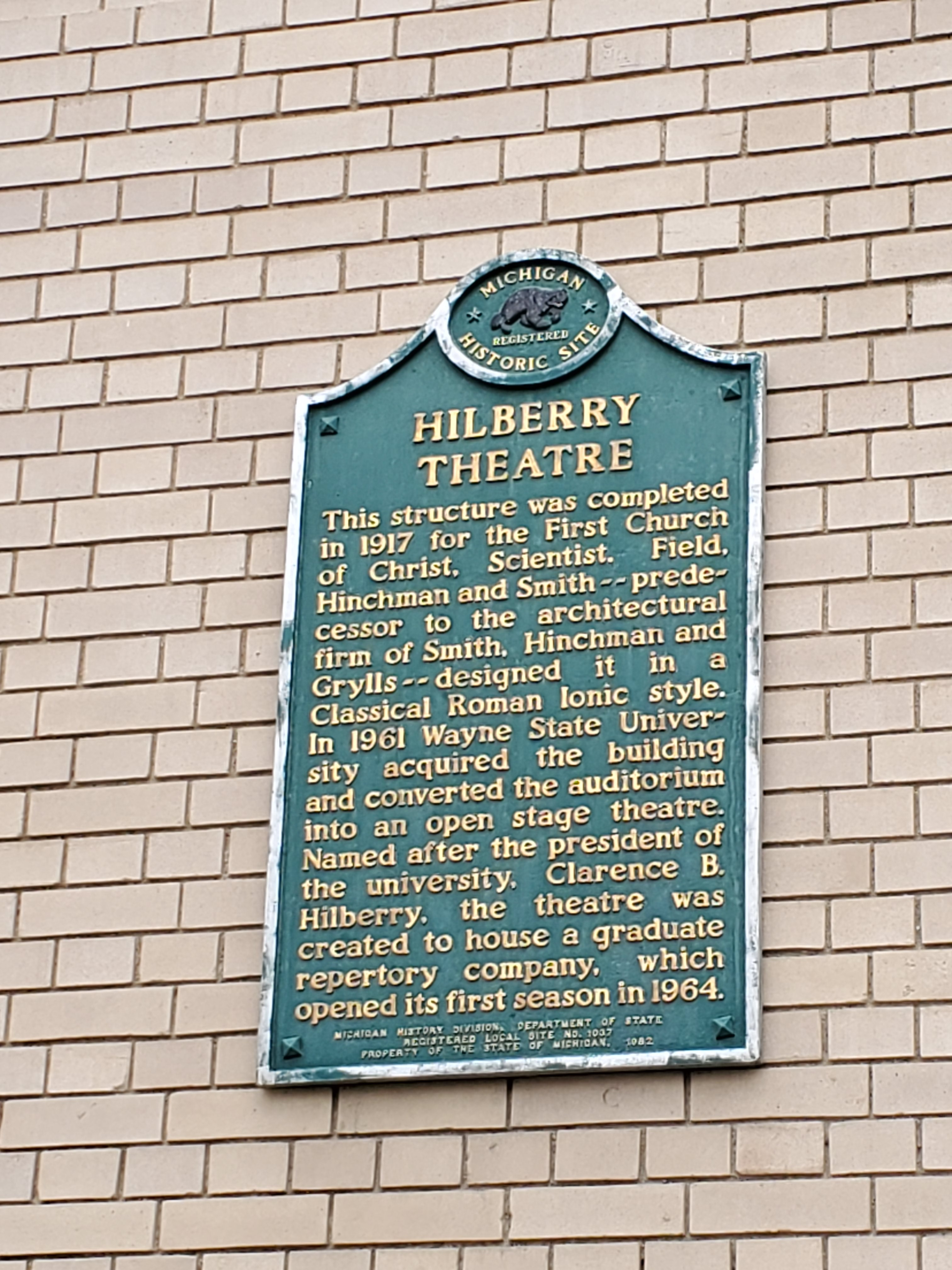
Hilberry Theatre historical marker, on the west-facing wall of the building

The Gretchen C. Valade Jazz Center is the oldest portion of the complex, as a major renovation of the existing Hilberry Theatre. The Valade Jazz Center will be a 350-seat performance hall, featuring revised acoustics, seating, and support spaces. The Valade Jazz Center is named after the late Gretchen C. Valade, longtime patron of the Detroit Jazz Festival, and major supporter of the Hilberry Gateway construction.

The building was constructed as the First Church of Christ, Scientist in 1917 in the Roman Ionic style, and is a contributing property to the Wayne State University Buildings historic district. The building's life as a theatre began when the university purchased the building in 1961, reopening it in 1964 with a repertory season of four plays by William Shakespeare. The Hilberry closed in 2022, after 58 years, with a production of The Merry Wives of Windsor.

=== Production Wing ===
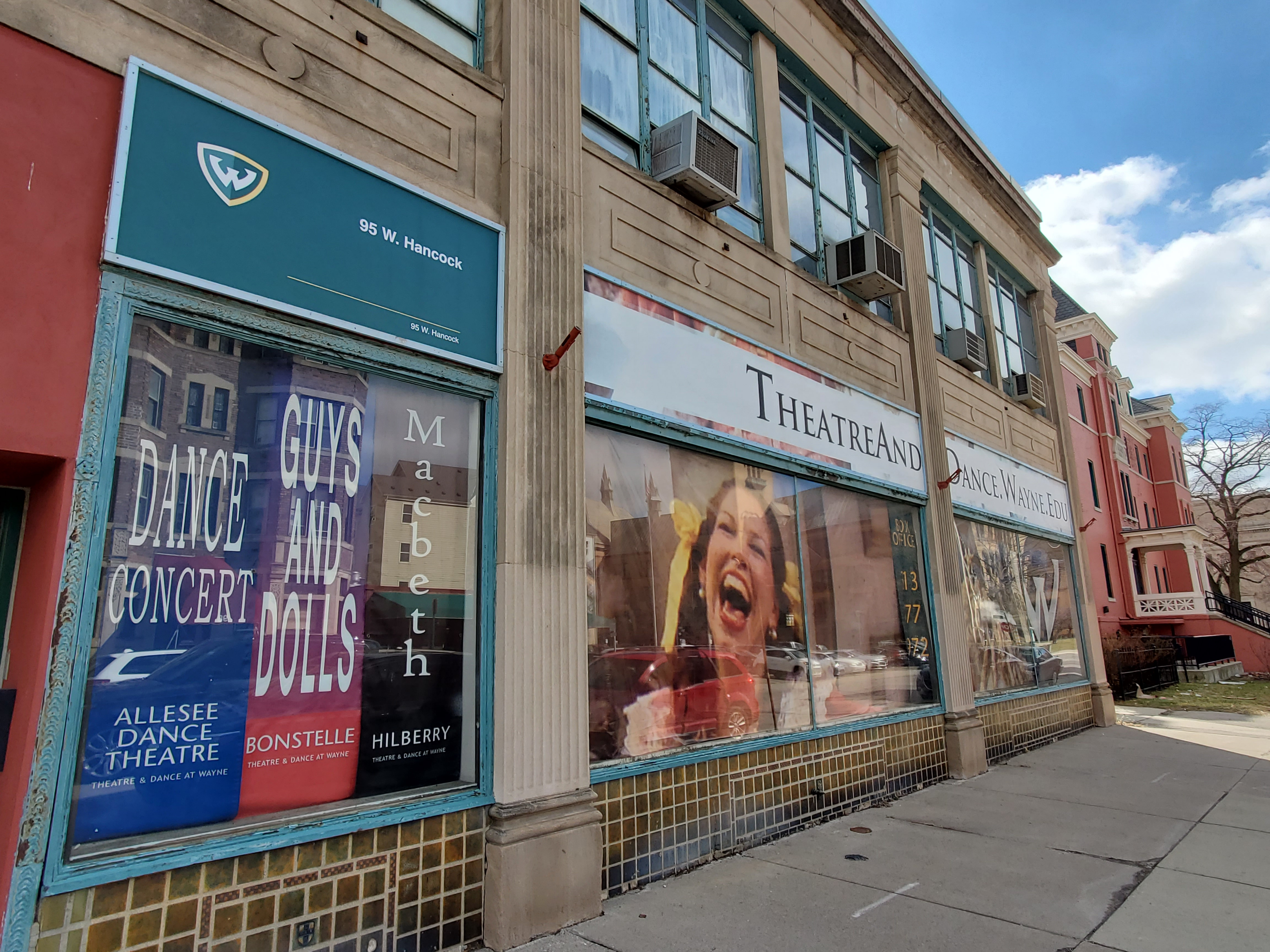
The former scenic and costume shop at 95 West Hancock St, replaced by the Production Wing

The 22,800 ft^{2} (2,120 m^{2}) Production Wing houses fully-equipped costume, scenic, lighting, and properties shops, a design studio, dressing rooms, and offices. The Production Wing is located behind the proscenium theater's stage, with direct connections to the black box theater. The Production Wing replaces an offsite scenic and costume shop at 95 West Hancock St.

== Construction ==
An integral part of the project was the relocation of the historic David Mackenzie House, the residence of the university's first president. The relocation was accomplished in 2019 over the course of three days, moving the house to another location on the same block.

The newly constructed portions of the complex were built using precast concrete to accommodate the logistical challenges of building on the site.
