= Hilberry Theatre =

Auditorium in Detroit, Michigan, U.S.

- U.S. Historic district – Contributing property
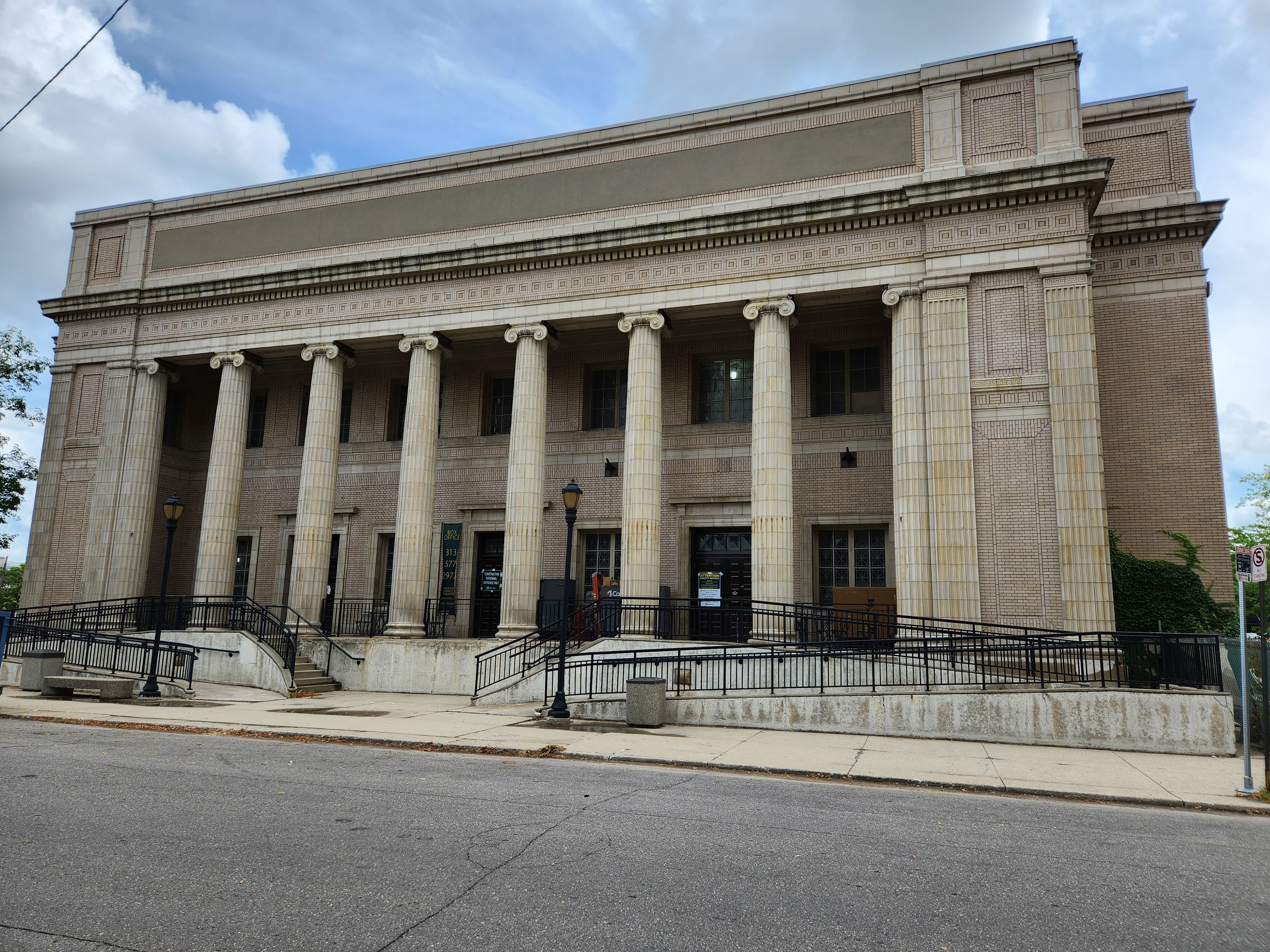
- Seen in 2023, during renovations

- Location within Michigan
- Location: 4743 Cass Avenue; Detroit, Michigan, U.S.
- Coordinates: 42°21′15″N 83°3′57.4″W
- Built: 1917
- Architect: Field, Hinchman & Smith
- Architectural style: Neoclassical
- Part of: Wayne State University Buildings (ID78001524)
- Designated CP: June 23, 1978

The Hilberry Theatre is a 534-seat auditorium located at 4743 Cass Avenue in Midtown Detroit, Michigan, United States. Created in 1963, the Hilberry served as the theatre space for approximately 40-50 graduate students pursuing degrees in theatre fields at the Wayne State University main campus.

In December, 2022, the Hilberry closed its doors for renovations. Its successor for live theatrical performances is the adjacent Hilberry Gateway, which opened in April 2023. The Hilberry Theatre will be renovated as the Gretchen C. Valade Jazz Center, a leading performance venue designed specifically for jazz.

== History ==
In February 1917, the First Church of Christ Scientist was built on the corner of Cass Avenue and Hancock Street, in the heart of Midtown Detroit. The Christian Scientists of Detroit were a growing community in need of a location to hold their services. The building held up to 1,512 members and included a 60-foot stage and 22 rooms. Later on in 1961, it was purchased and remodeled by Wayne State University. The price was $250,000.

The building was renamed the Hilberry Theatre, after Wayne State's president from 1952 to 1965, the former English professor Clarence B. Hilberry. It reopened in January 1964; theatre professor Leonard Leone was instrumental in the effort.

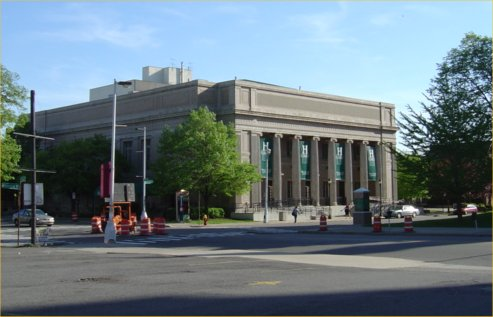
Hilberry Theatre, ca. 2006

The first play performed at the Hilberry Theatre was called Shakespeare 400, in honor of the 400th anniversary of William Shakespeare's birth. Today, the Hilberry Theatre is one of three different historic buildings now used for classes by Wayne State students. The Hilberry was also considered to be one of the best training grounds for new and upcoming actors/actresses, directors, designers, and stage managers in the US.

In December 2022, the Hilberry Theatre closed its doors for renovations. The final play to grace the stage at the Hilberry was The Merry Wives of Windsor, an homage to the history of the building as a world class training of classic and contemporary artists.

The Hilberry is currently undergoing renovations and will soon reopen as the Gretchen C. Valade Jazz Center, establishing a new home for Wayne State University's lauded jazz program. The theatre will undergo renovations that include a new audience chamber, acoustically designed to optimize the jazz experience, and a new seating configuration for a total of 350 seats. Renovations will also include updates to restrooms, the lobby and dressing rooms. Below the main lobby, the Valade will boast a new Underground Jazz Cafe.

== Memorable productions ==
John Osborne's controversial drama about Martin Luther (Luther), was performed in 1972. Beyond the Horizon, by Eugene O'Neill, was performed in 1995.

Jerry Crawford, professor at the University of Nevada, and co-author Joan Snyder used photographs of several Hilberry productions as illustrations and examples of good performance values in their 1977 book Acting, in Person and in Style. The Wayne State productions of Oedipus the King, Wild Oats, Life of Galileo, and The Caucasian Chalk Circle are included in the often-reprinted textbook.

== Architecture ==
The Hilberry Theatre was originally constructed in 1916–1917 by the architectural firm Field, Hinchman & Smith as the First Church of Christ Scientist.

Designed in a Neoclassical architecture and Ionic style, the Hilberry is a low rise building with an estimated height of 41.55 feet and consists of two floors, as well as a basement. The Hilberry has an Ionic style colonnade on the exterior of the building facing Hancock Street and its masonry is made to resemble that of marble. The exterior door frames are surrounded in classical moldings and the facade facing Cass Avenue is designed in similar manner and serves as the main entrance to the theatre.

On June 16, 1961, Wayne State University purchased the church building and remodeled its 60-foot stage and 1,512 seated auditorium into a 532 seated theater. The open stage theatre was designed using a Roman and Elizabethan approach. A traditional stage with backdrop and doors, a center performance stage, and elevated area surrounding the seating area. The theatre opened in 1964 to house a graduate repertory company.

The Hilberry is currently undergoing renovations and will soon reopen as the Gretchen C. Valade Jazz Center.

== See also ==
- Wayne State University Buildings
- Performing arts in Detroit
