= Leo M. Franklin =

Rabbi

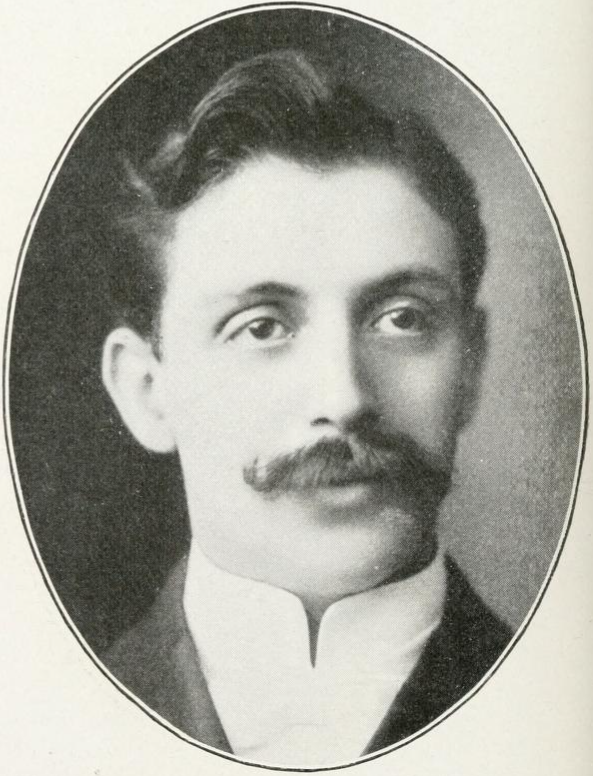
- Born: March 5, 1870; Cambridge City, Indiana, U.S.
- Died: August 8, 1948 (aged 78); Detroit, Michigan, U.S.
- Occupation: Religion
- Spouse: Hattie Oberfelder
- Children: Ruth, Margaret, and Leo Franklin
- Parent(s): Michael H. and Rachel L. Franklin

Leo Morris Franklin (March 5, 1870 – August 8, 1948) was an influential Reform rabbi from Detroit, who headed Temple Beth El from 1899 to 1941.

== Early life ==
Leo M. Franklin was born on March 5, 1870, in Cambridge City, Indiana, to Michael H. and Rachel Levy Franklin. When Franklin was four, his family moved to Cincinnati, where he attended public school. As a teenager, Franklin attended both the University of Cincinnati and Hebrew Union College simultaneously. In 1892, he graduated Phi Beta Kappa from Cincinnati; in the same year, he graduated from Hebrew Union (as the only member of his class), and was ordained as a rabbi. He was immediately invited to serve the Temple Israel in Omaha, Nebraska.

== Temple Israel, Omaha ==
On September 1, 1892, Franklin assumed his duties at Temple Israel. He immediately began advocating changes to strengthen Reform Judaism in his congregation, suggesting the adoption of the Union Prayer Book and the ritual endorsed by the Central Conference of American Rabbis. The congregation adopted his suggestions enthusiastically. However, due to a business recession in the early 1890s, temple income slowly decreased, and the congregation at Temple Israel shrank (from 114 to 84). Despite circumstances, Franklin was able to augment the Temple Building fund, slated for the construction of a new building to house the congregation. The congregation re-elected him to a five-year term in 1896, with a ringing endorsement.

On July 15, 1896, Franklin married Hattie Oberfelder; the ceremony was performed at her parents' house in Chicago. The couple's first daughter, Ruth, was born in Omaha.

During his tenure in Omaha, Franklin reached out beyond the congregation of Temple Israel. He organized a Reform congregation in Lincoln, Nebraska, established a normal school for religious instructors, edited the official publication of the Omaha Humane Society, and was active in many other educational and charitable activities. In addition, he delivered sermons at other congregations, including spending a week in Sioux City, Iowa.

Due to his ministrations and other activities, including contributions to various periodicals, Franklin garnered a reputation as one of the more promising young Reform ministers. In 1898, Franklin was invited to deliver a sermon in Detroit. His speech was received with such approval that Detroit's Temple Beth El immediately invited him to serve as their rabbi, replacing the recently departed Dr. Louis Grossmann. Franklin pondered the matter, and, sensing a greater opportunity in Detroit, accepted Temple Beth El's offer. He left Omaha in January 1899 on cordial terms, keeping in contact with the Omaha congregation for years later.

== Temple Beth El, Detroit, 1899–1920 ==
Franklin preached his first sermon as Rabbi of Beth El at the Washington Boulevard temple on January 27, 1899. He again began by advocating changes. The congregation passed a new constitution later that year, and, in November 1899, Franklin organized the United Jewish Charities, an umbrella organization to coordinate the philanthropic activities of the currently-existing Beth El Hebrew Relief Society, Hebrew Ladies' Sewing Society, Self-Help Circle, and Jewish Relief Society. In 1901, Franklin organized the Woman's Auxiliary Association (later the Sisterhood of Temple Beth El), and assumed editorship of the Jewish American, Detroit's first English-Jewish weekly.

Franklin thought a new temple on Detroit's "Piety Row" along Woodward would serve the congregation by increasing the visibility of the Jewish faith. He convinced the Beth El congregation to build a new temple. They purchased land on Woodward near Eliot and engaged George Mason as an architect; Mason was aided by the young (and then relatively unknown) Beth El congregant Albert Kahn. The cornerstone of the building was laid in 1902 and the first service was held in the new Temple in January 1903. Beth El used this building until 1922; it is currently Wayne State University's Bonstelle Theater.

While in Detroit, Franklin's family expanded. In addition to Ruth, born in Omaha, Hattie Franklin gave birth to another daughter, Margaret, and a son, Leo.

Franklin introduced more changes over the next few years, including holding services on Sunday morning (in addition to Saturday morning), unassigned seating, and an exchange of pulpits with out-of-town rabbis. He reached out to Orthodox and Conservative congregations, instituted an interdenominational community Thanksgiving service, and spoke often at church groups to attempt to bridge the gap between Jews and non-Jews. Franklin was a popular Rabbi, the Temple congregation increased from 136 members in 1899 (Franklin's first year in the pulpit) to 422 in 1910. In 1917, Beth El was the third largest Reform congregation in the country.

Franklin reached out to younger Jews, establishing an annual service for students of the University of Michigan in 1912, and establishing a student congregation (the forerunner of the Hillel Society) at the University of Michigan in 1914. As a result, the Central Conference of American Rabbis and the Union of American Hebrew Congregations created a Joint Commission on Religious Work in Universities, naming Franklin as the chair. Franklin was named president of the Central Conference of American Rabbis in 1919.

== Leo Franklin and Henry Ford ==
An accidental result of Franklin's prominence in Detroit was his relationship with Henry Ford. In the early 1910s, Ford and Franklin lived on the same block of Edison Avenue (and were, along with Horace Rackham, the first three residents of the block). Ford would occasionally stop and chat with Franklin on his way to the Ford Piquette Avenue Plant, and entertained Franklin in his home on social occasions. In 1913, Ford asked Albert Kahn (who, as well as being a Beth El congregant, had worked for Ford) to approach Franklin on Ford's behalf and offer him the use of a customized Model T for use on his pastoral rounds. Ford chose Kahn as an intermediary "lest [Franklin] would misunderstand his motive." Franklin, however, accepted Ford's offer, and Ford presented him with a new car every year for several years, even after Ford had moved to Dearborn.

However, in 1920, Ford began publishing a series of antisemitic "International Jew" articles in his paper, The Dearborn Independent. The articles took Franklin (and most of his Jewish colleagues) by surprise. Franklin believed Ford was, at heart, a good man and an ally; he wrote: "Such venom could only some from a Jew-hater of the lowest type, and here it was appearing in a newspaper owned and controlled by one whom the Jews had counted among their friends. It was veritably a bolt out of the blue."

Franklin was a member of the local Anti-Defamation League. As a friend of Ford's, and having easy access to his office, Franklin was delegated to discuss the matter with Ford. He paid Ford a visit and was on the verge of convincing him to issue at least a partial retraction when an intemperate telegram from Louis B. Marshall, president of the American Jewish Committee, hardened Ford's stance. Franklin left the meeting in disappointment, upset with Marshall's lack of tact (as Marshall was upset with Franklin's naivete). When the Independent continued to publish antisemitic articles, Franklin returned his latest customized Model T, with a letter of protest to Ford. Within days, Ford phoned Franklin, genuinely surprised that "good" Jews—like Franklin—would be opposed to what had been written. He did not, however, cease publishing the Independent.

That day came much later: in 1927, Ford endured a libel trial over the Independent that caused him to close the paper and issue a public apology. Franklin immediately wrote Ford, reminding him of their conversation seven years earlier but accepting his apology. Franklin did not, as some of his colleagues suggested, immediately approach Ford for a monetary example of his contrition. Instead, he preferred to keep Ford in his debt, saying, "let us be the creditors while he remains our debtor."

However, The International Jew, published in book form in the early 1920s, was still in print, and Ford did not respond to Franklin's requests to halt printing. Relations between the two men remained frosty, and they didn't directly communicate until 1938. Smarting from the fallout over his acceptance of a Grand Cross of the German Eagle from Nazi Germany, Ford asked Franklin to disseminate the message that he wished to hire displaced European Jews. Franklin worked with Ford to craft a message decrying the treatment of Jews and delivered the missive to Detroit's newspapers. Upon publication, antisemitic activists such as Father Charles Coughlin questioned its authenticity. Franklin was outraged, but Ford never publicly backed the statement.

== Temple Beth El, Detroit, 1920–1948 ==
Meanwhile, in the early 1920s, Beth El was outgrowing the temple that had been constructed in 1902; the congregation had grown and many had moved north into neighborhoods such as Boston-Edison (where Franklin himself lived). In 1921, Albert Kahn was contracted as the architect for a new temple, located on Woodward and Gladstone. The new temple (now the Bethel Community Transformation Center) was dedicated in November 1922. In that same year, Franklin was elected by the congregation to a life tenure.

Beth El and Franklin continued to evolve. In 1925, the By-Laws of the congregation were amended to provide that the wife of a congregation member could become a member in her own right. That same year, weekly broadcasts of services over WWJ were instituted. Franklin also wrote and published multiple books, including The Rabbi, the Man and His Message; The Road to Understanding Between Christian and Jew; and An Outline History of Congregation Beth El, Detroit, Michigan. By 1926, the congregation numbered over 1400 members.

Franklin continued to be involved in numerous activities within the congregation and beyond. He was a trustee of the Detroit Symphony Orchestra and the Detroit Civic Theatre, and was on the board of the Detroit Public Library, acting as president in 1932, 1938, and 1944. He also served on the boards of the Fine Arts Society, the Board of Commerce, the Greater Detroit Motion Picture Council, the Detroit Historical Society, the Wrangler's Club, the Ford Republic, the League of Nations Association of Detroit, and the Citizens Housing and Planning Association. In addition, Franklin was active as an officer on the Michigan Humane Society for many years. He received an honorary Doctor of Law degrees from the University of Detroit (a Catholic institution) in 1923 and Wayne State University in 1939, and an honorary Doctor of Divinity from his alma mater, Hebrew Union College, in 1939.

In 1941, Franklin retired from active ministry, succeeded by B. Benedict Glazer. The Board of Trustees bestowed on him the title of "rabbi emeritus," and he continued to be involved in the congregation.

On August 8, 1948, Leo Franklin died. The archives of the Temple Beth El are named in his honor.
