= List of buildings on Woodward Avenue =

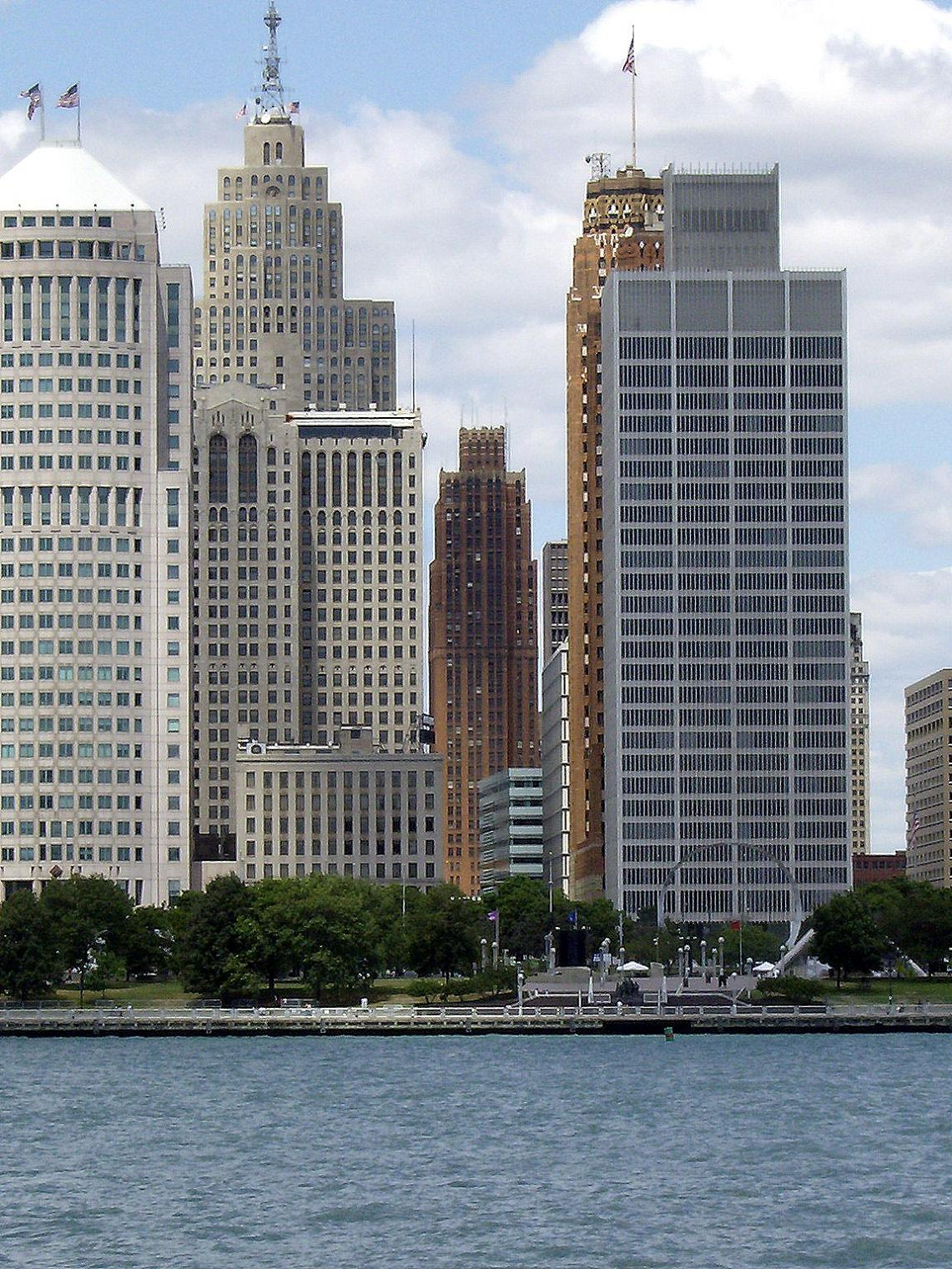
Detroit Financial District viewed from the International Riverfront.

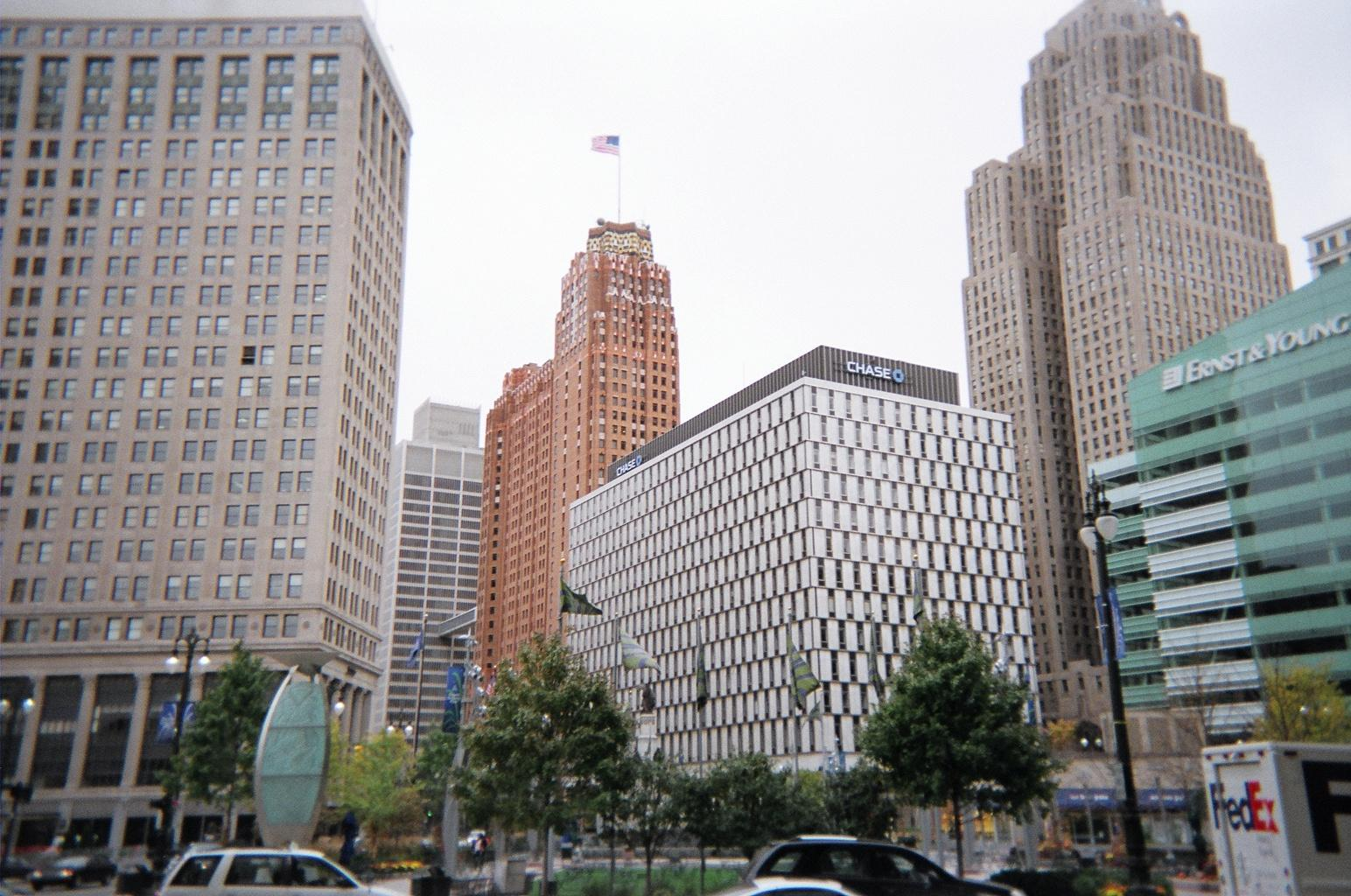
Detroit Financial District.

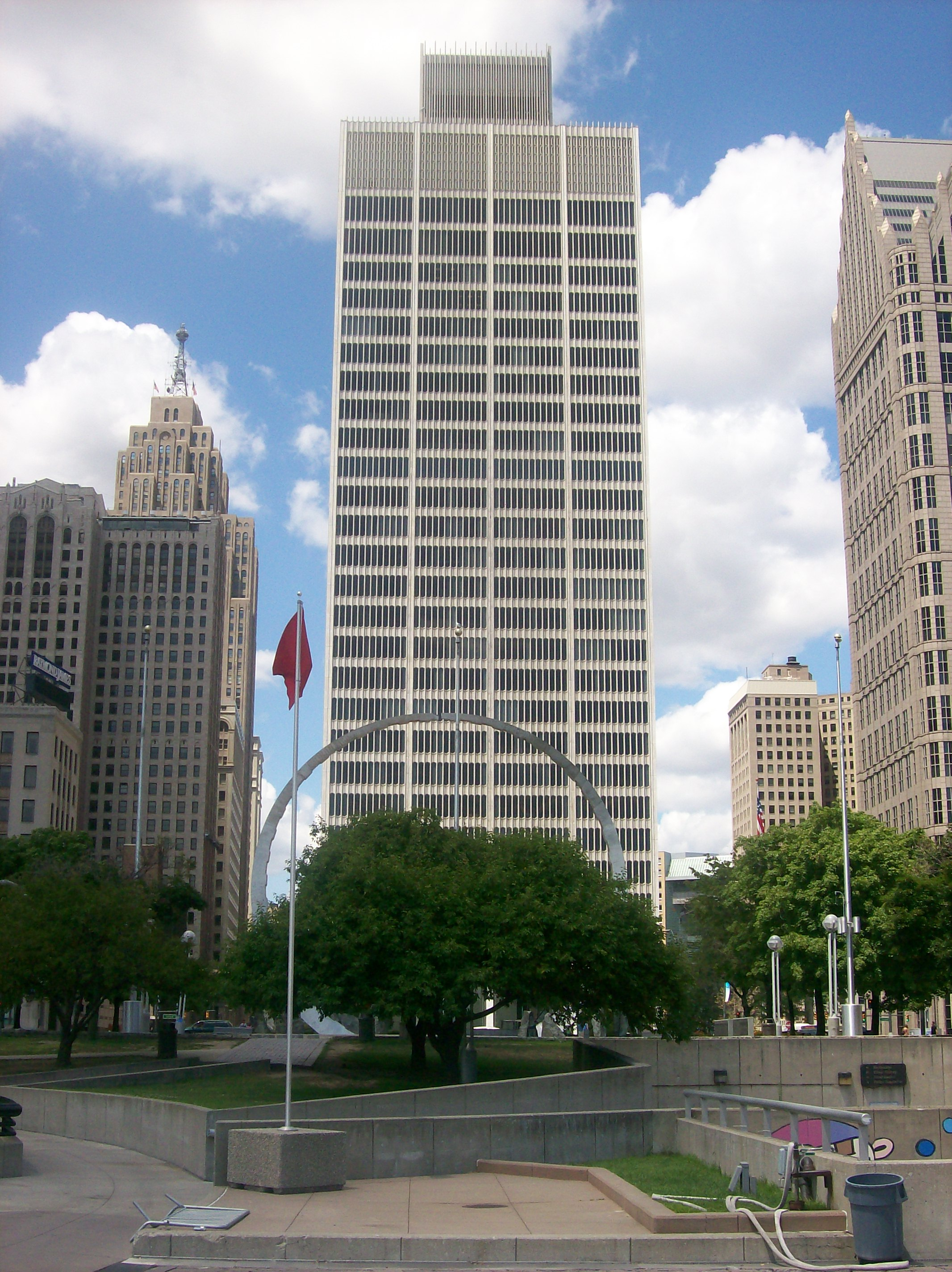
One Woodward Avenue.

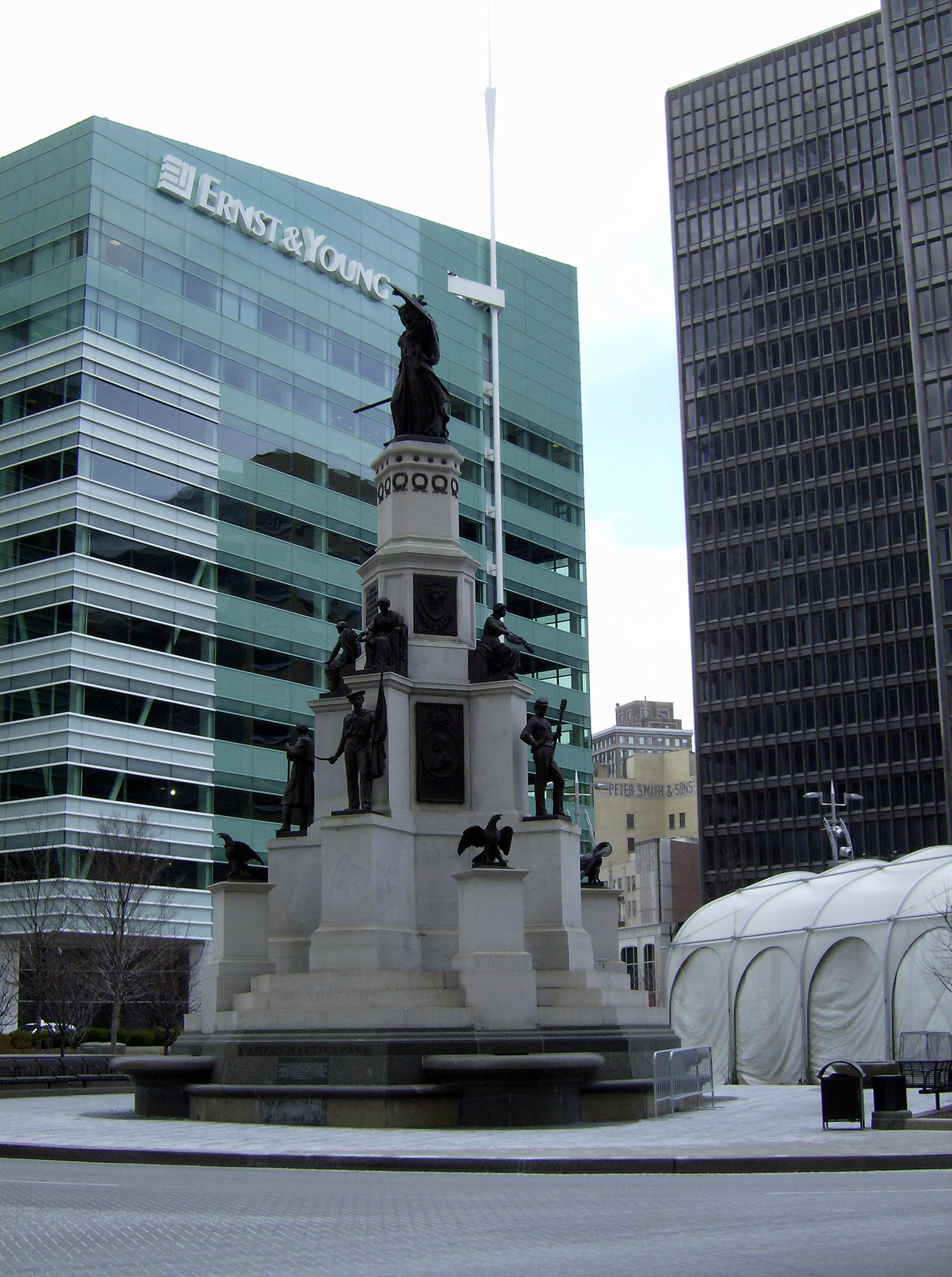
Campus Martius Park.

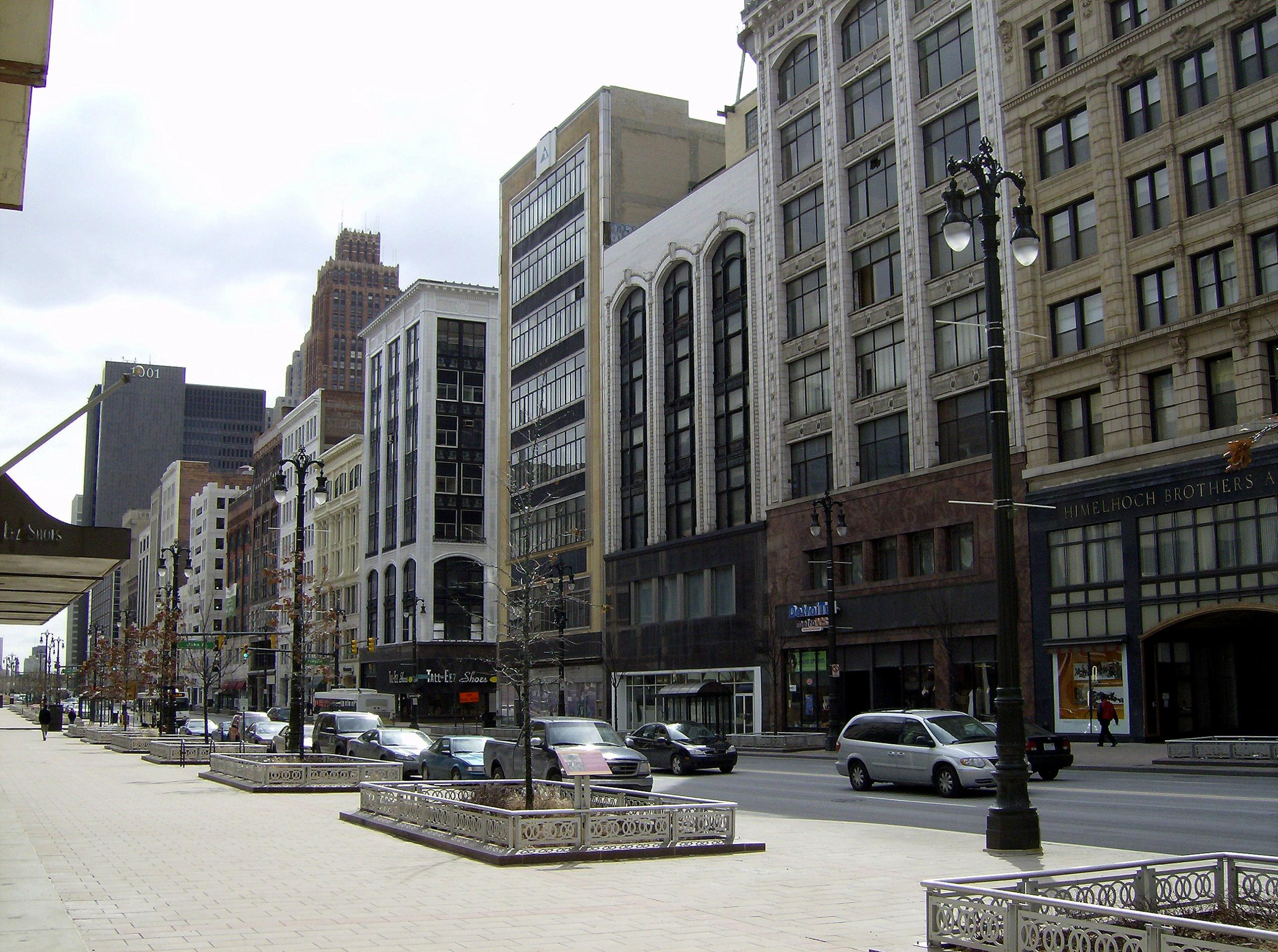
Historic Merchant's Row on Woodward between Campus Martius Park and Grand Circus Park in downtown Detroit, just south of the David Whitney Building.

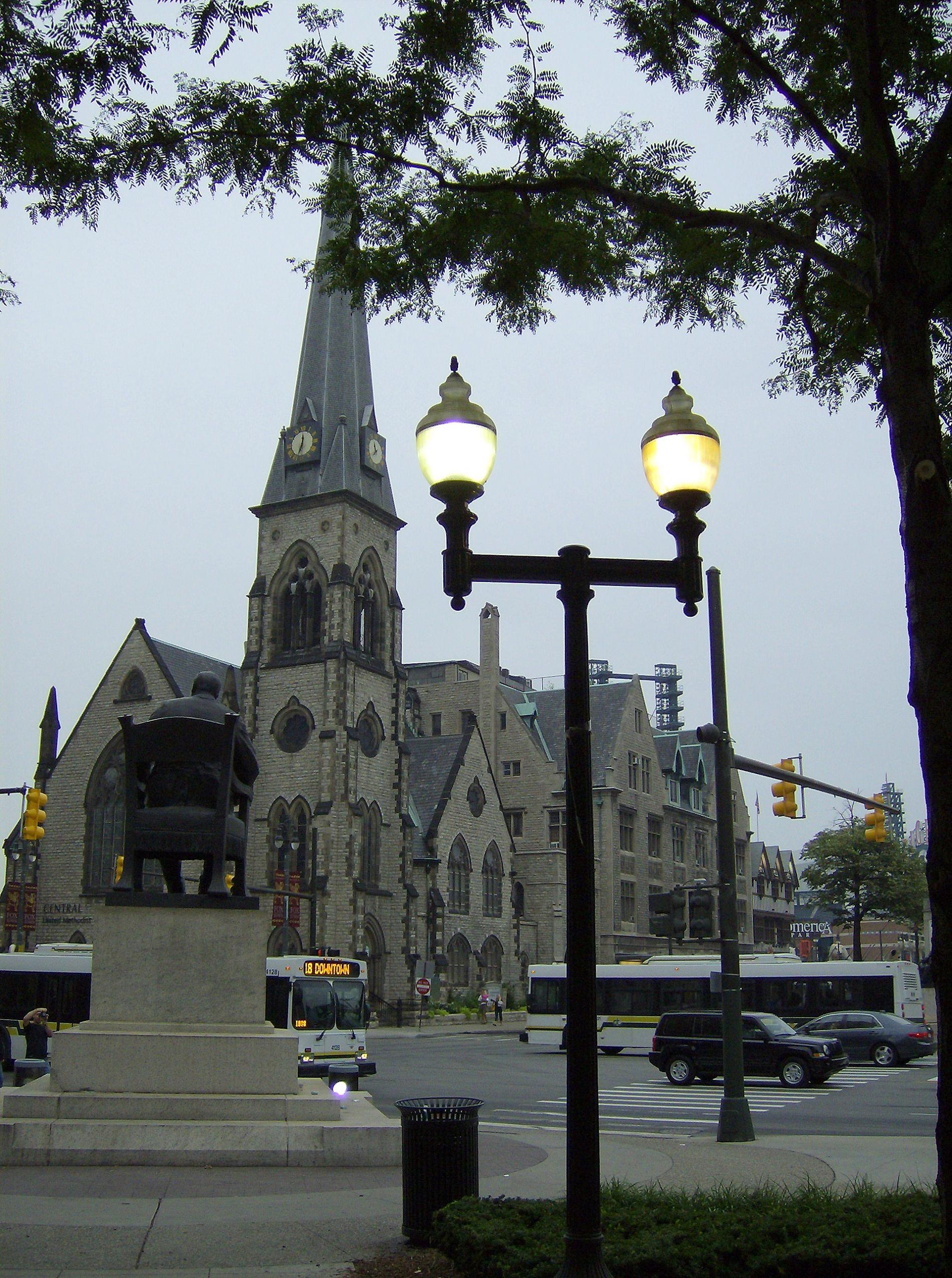
Central United Methodist Church.

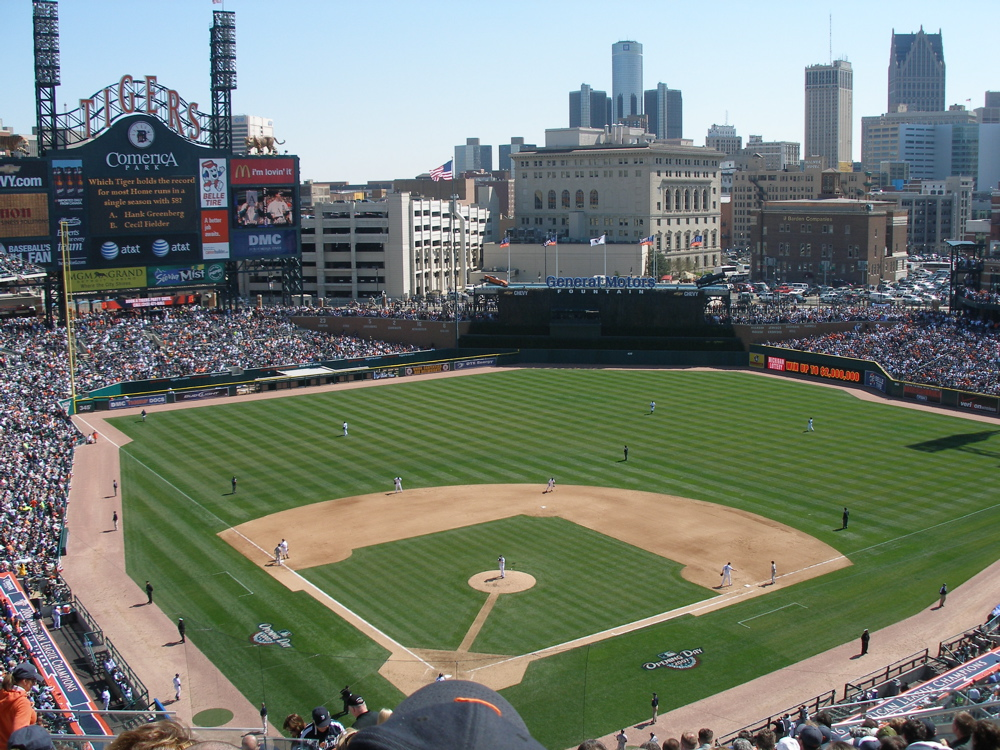
Comerica Park.

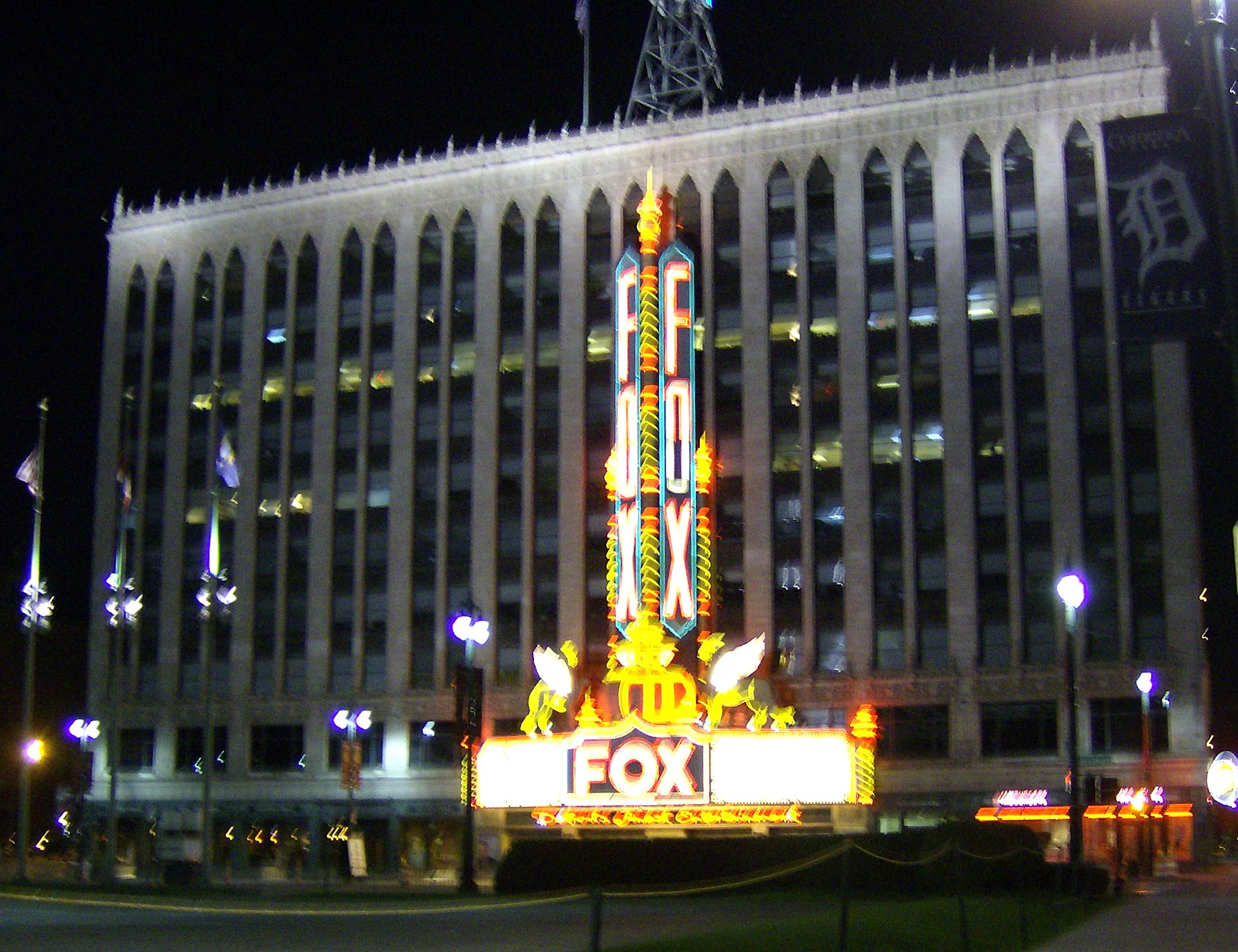
Fox Theatre lights up 'Foxtown' in downtown Detroit

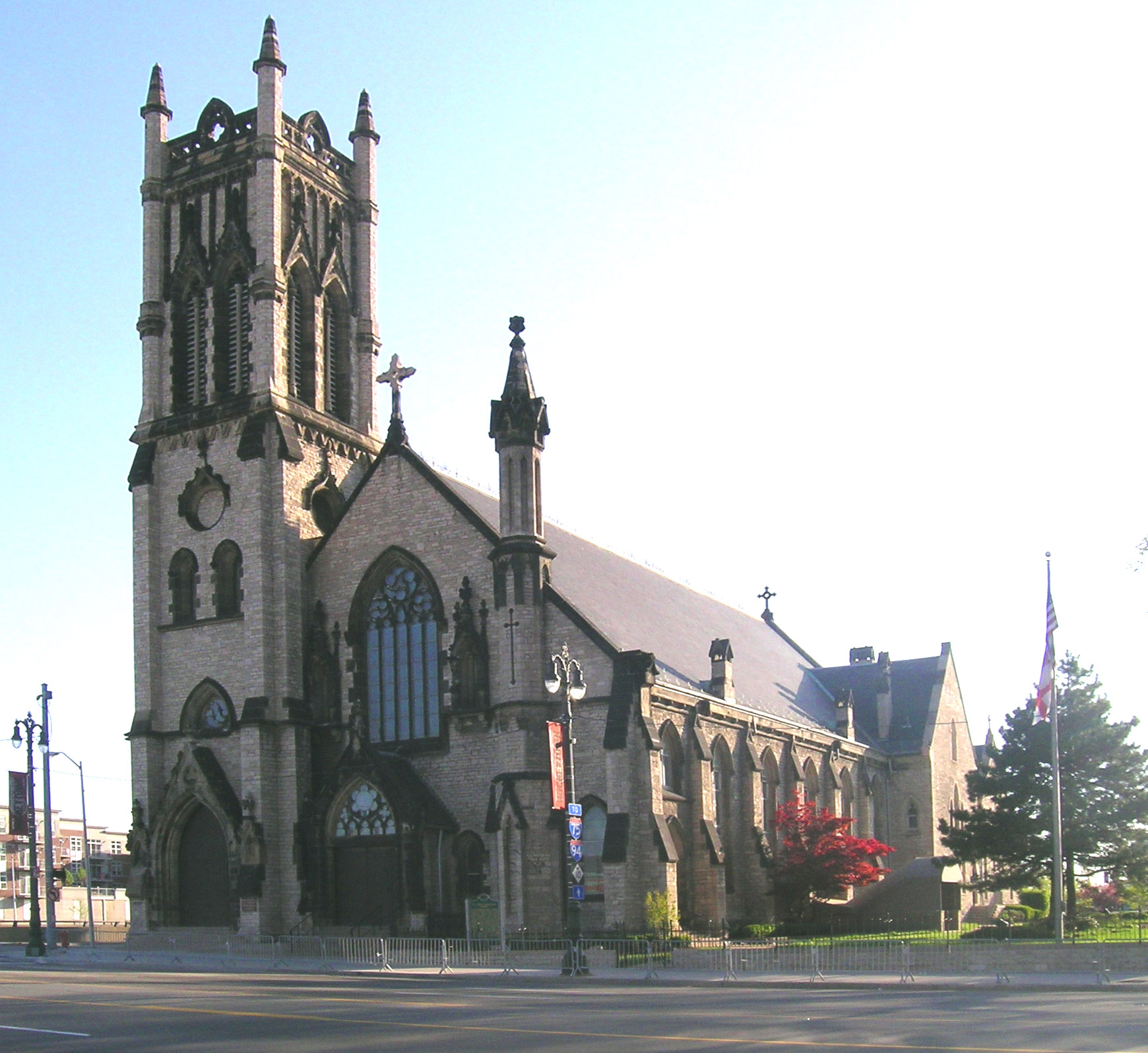
St. John's Episcopal Church

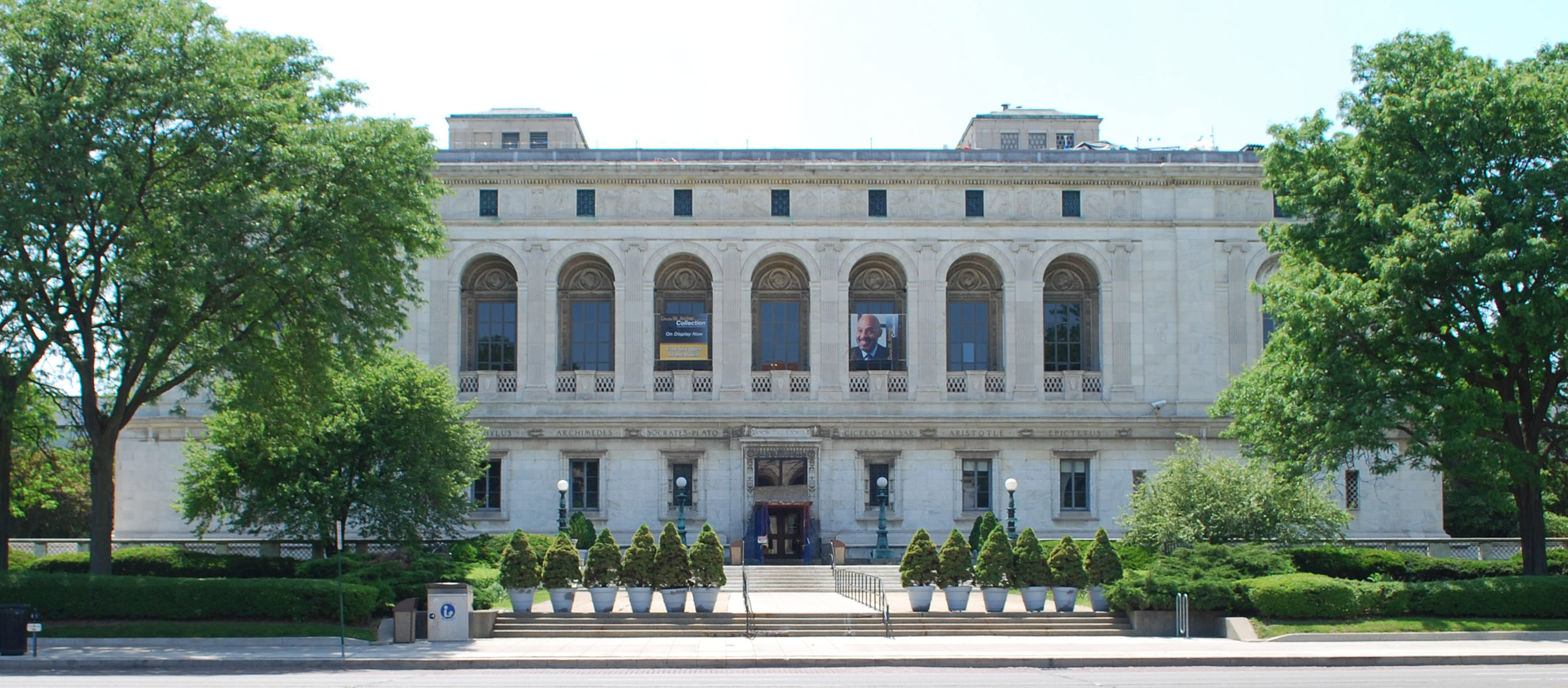
Detroit Public Library.

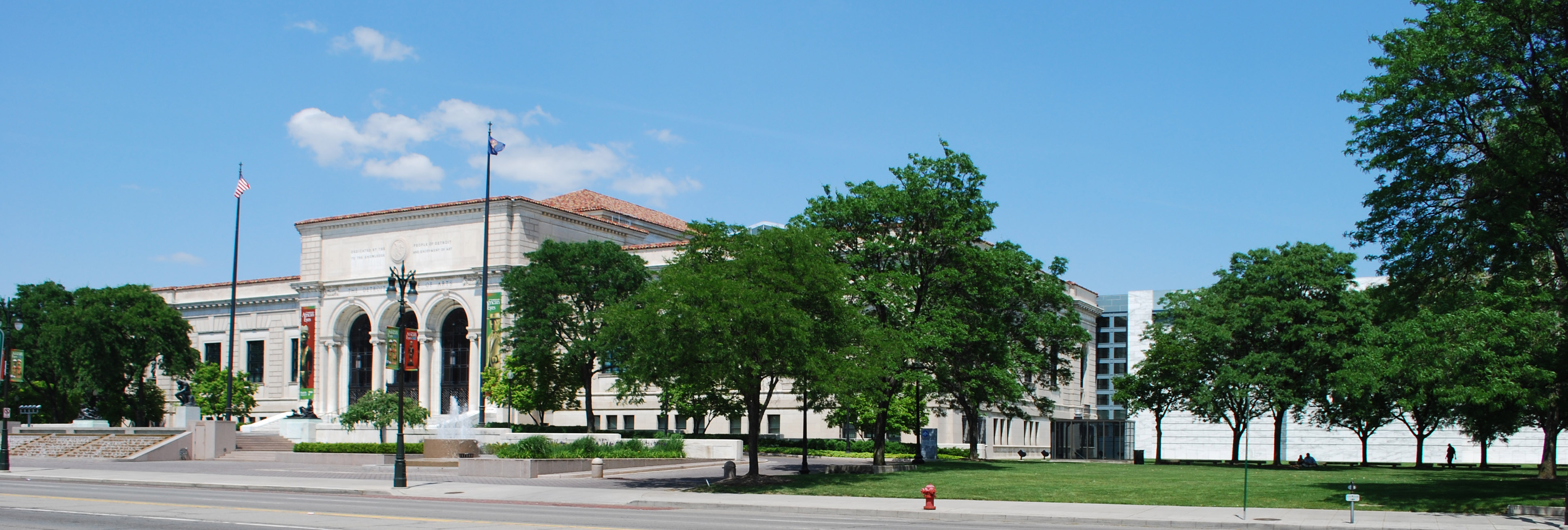
Detroit Institute of Arts.

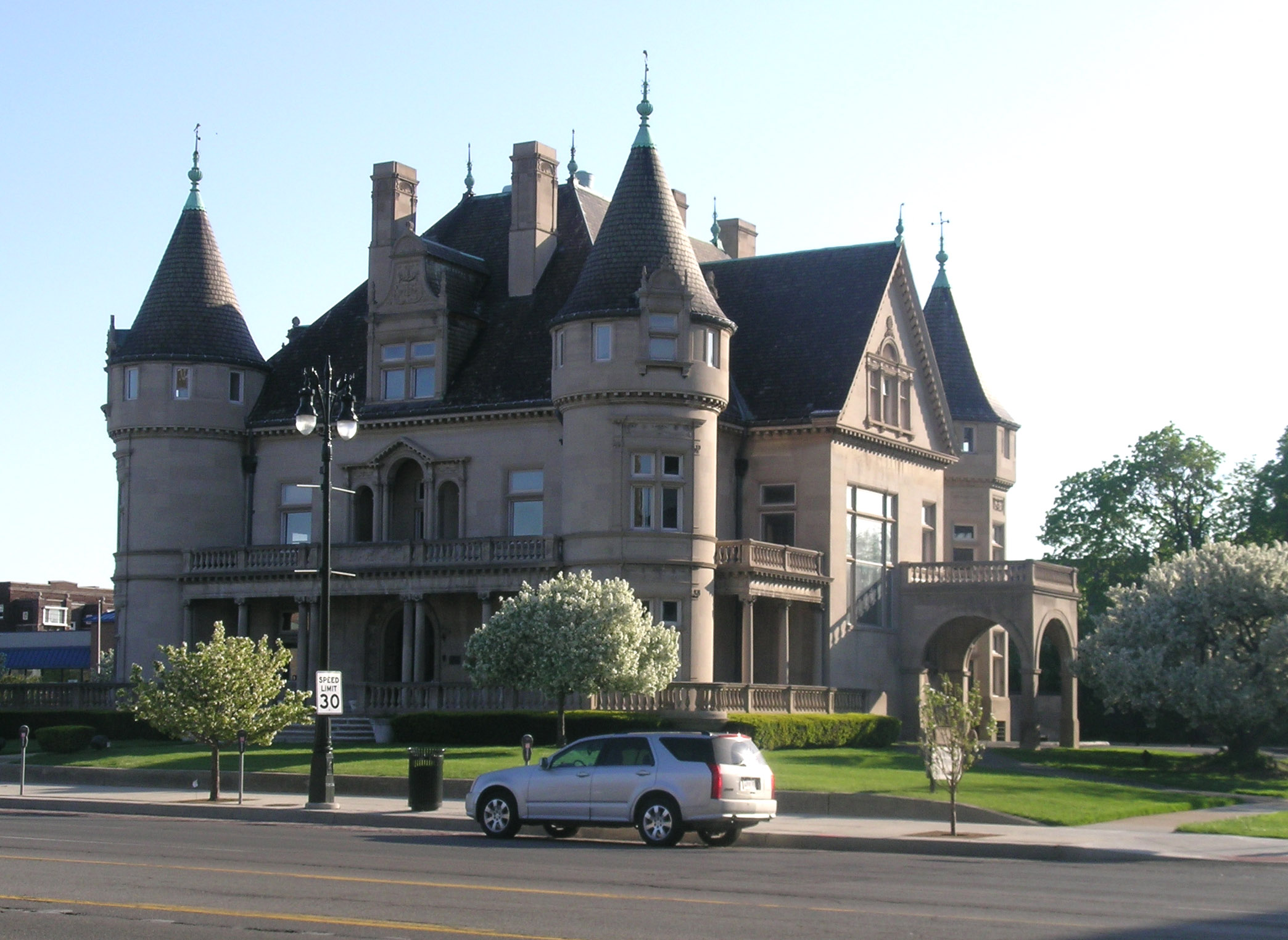
Col. Frank J. Hecker House (1891), 5510 Woodward, designed by Louis Kamper after Château de Chenonceaux.

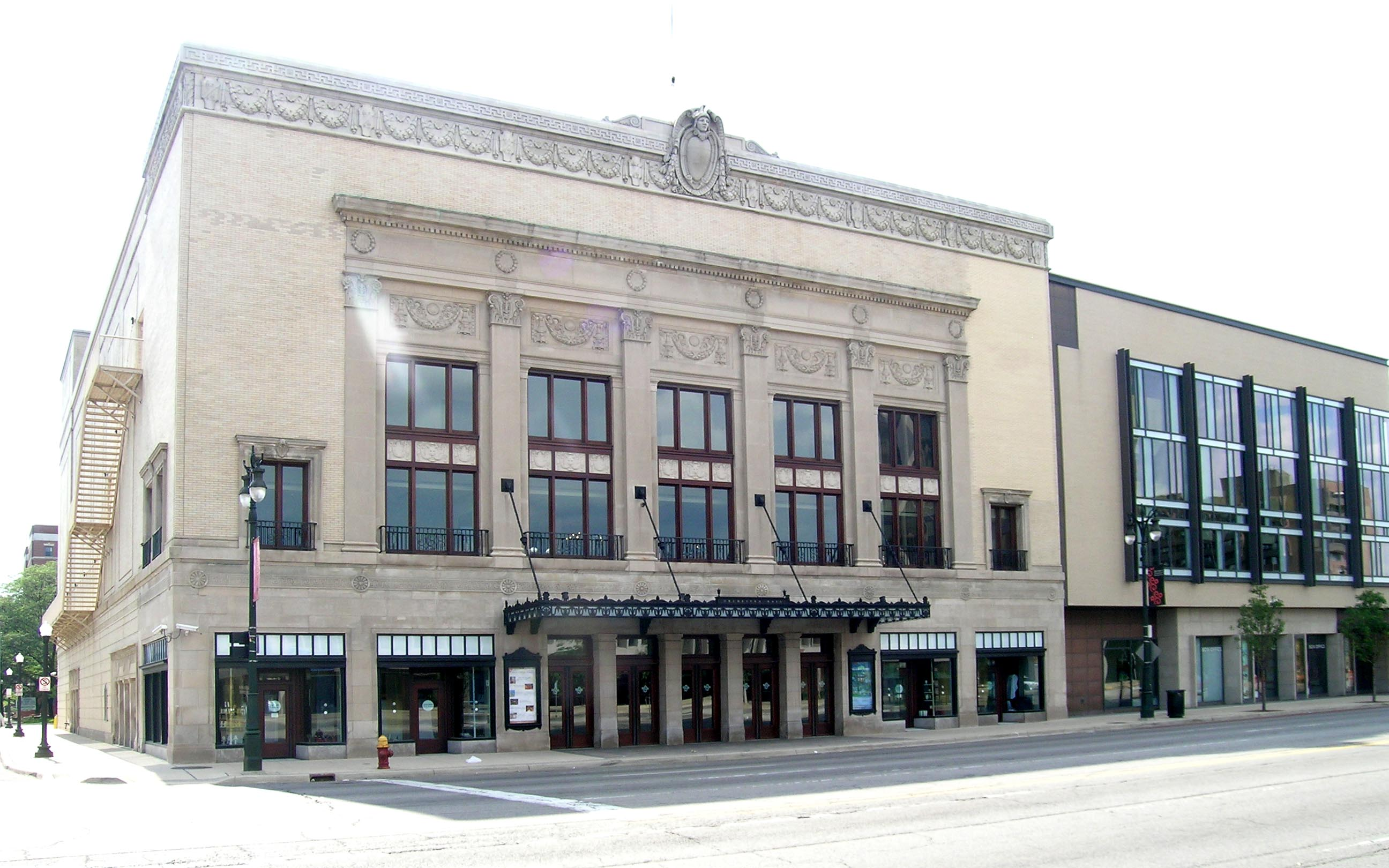
Orchestra Hall.

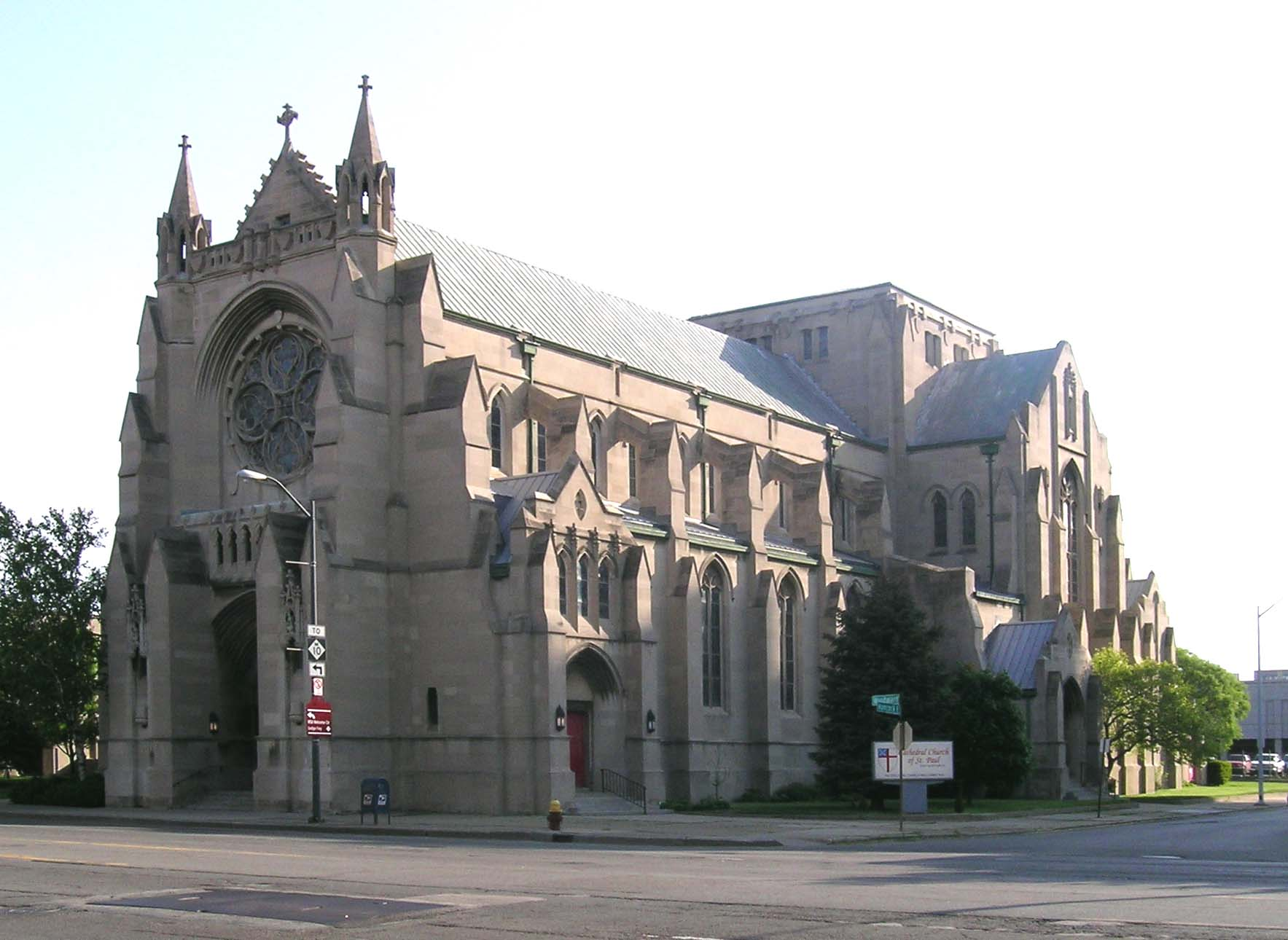
Cathedral Church of St. Paul.

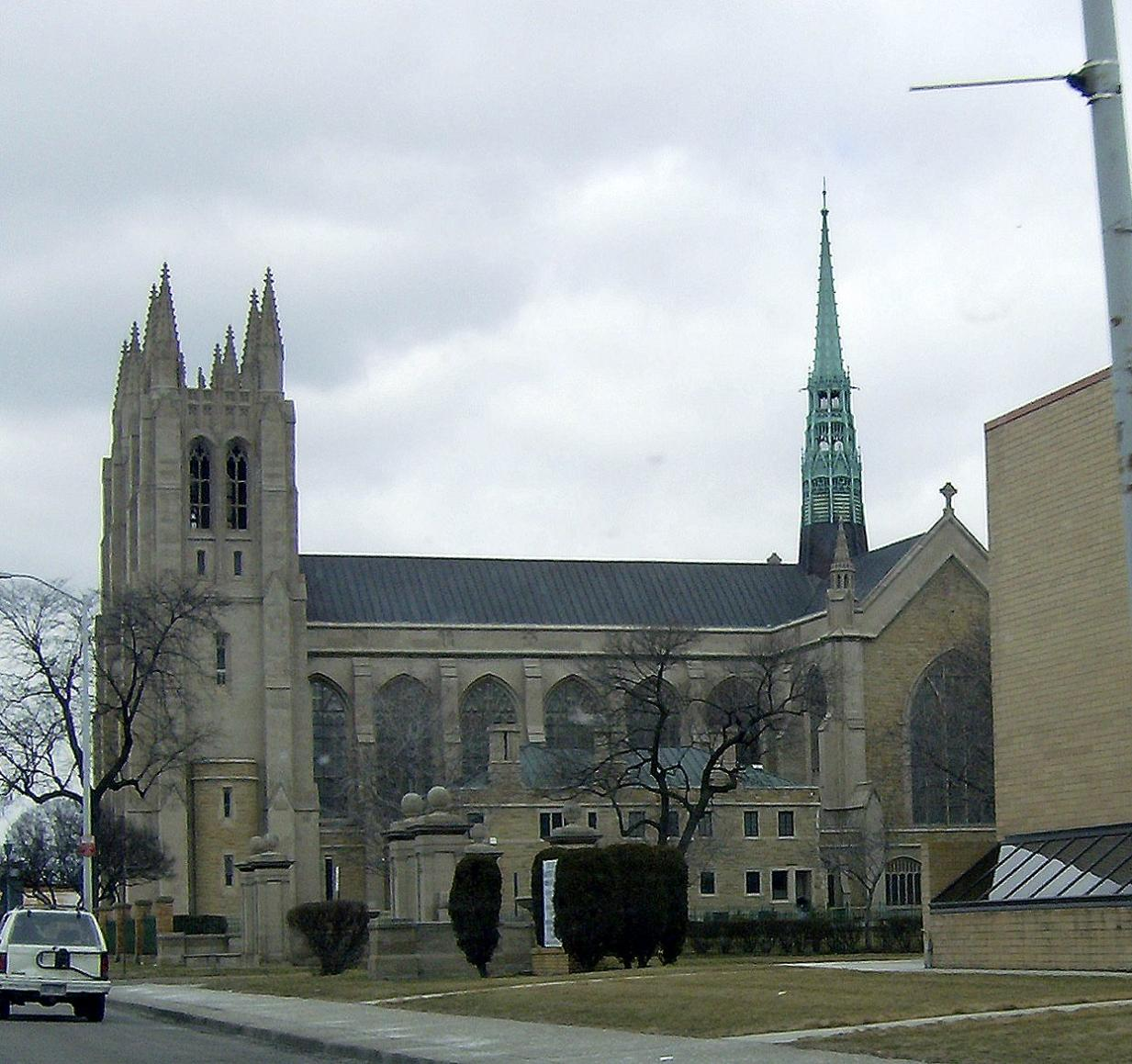
Cathedral of the Most Blessed Sacrament.

The list below shows the information on the buildings along Woodward Avenue in Detroit, Michigan. This list begins at Woodward's southern terminus at the Detroit River and proceeds north to the Detroit city limits at Eight Mile Road, also known as M-102.

Address	Name		Use	Built	Style	Floors	Notes
Address	West side of street	East side of street	Use	Built	Style	Floors	Notes
Detroit River/Hart Plaza contains Horace E. Dodge and Son Memorial Fountain, designed by Isamu Noguchi, and Noguchi's Pylon Tower
Jefferson Avenue; Joe Louis' Fist
1 Woodward Avenue	One Woodward Avenue		Office building	1962	Modern	29	designed by Yamasaki Associates, designers of the now-destroyed World Trade Center in New York City. Has 28 above-ground floors, one basement floor.
2 Woodward Avenue		Coleman A. Young Municipal Center	City hall and courthouse	1954	International	21	20 above-ground floors, one basement floor; Spirit of Detroit Sculpture at the entrance
Larned Street
500 Griswold Street	Guardian Building		Office building	1929	Art Deco	40	Known as the "Cathedral of Finance"
500 Woodward Avenue		One Detroit Center	Office building	1993	Gothic Revival, postmodern	45	43 above-ground floors, two basement floors; one of two planned towers
501 Woodward	Detroit Federal Savings and Loan Building		Office building	1971	Modern	5	Constructed on a lot "left-over" after Woodward was widened in the 1950s
Congress Street
600 Woodward Avenue		Vinton Building	Office building	1916	Neoclassical	14	12 above-ground floors, two basement floors
608 Woodward Avenue		Martin Limbach Hardware Store Building	retail/restaurant	1877	Victorian Commercial	5	
611 Griswold Street	The Qube		Office building	1959	Modern	14	Previously the National Bank of Detroit Building, Bank One Tower and Chase Tower, but commonly called the "Cheese Grater Building" due to its appearance, stands at the location of Detroit's first skyscraper, the Hammond Building
660 Woodward Avenue		First National Building	Office building	1922	Neoclassical	28	26 above-ground floors, 2 below-ground floors
West Fort Street | Cadillac Square
Campus Martius Park
777 Woodward Avenue	One Kennedy Square		Office building	2006	Modern	13	10 above-ground floors, three below-ground floors
Michigan Avenue | Monroe Street
One Campus Martius		Compuware World Headquarters	Office building	2003	Modern	20	18 above-ground floors, two below-ground floors
1001 Woodward Avenue	1001 Woodward		Mixed-use skyscraper	1965	International	25	23 above-ground floors, two mechanical floors, previously known as the First Federal Savings Building
1075 Woodward Avenue	1001 Woodward Parking Garage		Parking garage	2006	Modern	12	
Gratiot Avenue | State Street
1206 Woodward Avenue		Former site of J. L. Hudson Department Store and Addition	Office building, department store	1923–1946	Chicago School	33	29 above-ground floors, four below-ground floors
Grand River Avenue
1403 Woodward Avenue	Elliott Building		Apartment building	1894	Renaissance Revival	6	The structure was originally built as a retail building
1447 Woodward Avenue	Frank & Seder Building		Apartment building	1881	Chicago School	6	The building was the tallest in the state when built
Clifford Street | John R Street
1500 Woodward Avenue		Wright-Kay Building	mixed use	1891	Queen Anne	6	Originally known as the Schwankovsky Temple of Music; occupied 1920-78 by Wright-Kay Jewelers currently, a nightclub and residences
1545 Woodward Avenue	Himelhoch Apartments		Apartment building	1901	Renaissance Revival	8	The structure was originally built as an office and retail building, the Washington Arcade, and was later leased to upscale women's department store Himelhoch's from 1923 to 1977
1553 Woodward Avenue	David Whitney Building		Residential/Hotel	1915	Renaissance revival	19	The building underwent a $92 million renovation between 2013 and 2014
10 Witherell Street		David Broderick Tower	Apartment building	1928	Chicago School, Beaux-Arts	35	2 basement floors; converted to apartments in 2012
Park Avenue | Witherell Street
Grand Circus Park contains the Thomas Edison Memorial Fountain, monuments to mayors William C. Maybury and Hazen S. Pingree and a fountain honoring Governor Russell Alger by Daniel Chester French.
1600-1601 Woodward Avenue		Grand Circus Park Garage	Parking garage	1957	unknown	-2	The underground garage was built under the two portions of the park in 1957. The eastern portion accommodates 250 cars and the western portion accommodates 540.
Adams Street
10 West Adams Street	Fyfe Building		Apartment Building	1919	Gothic Revival	14	Constructed as offices and retail; later converted to apartments with retail space at street level
23 East Adams Street		Central United Methodist Church	Methodist Church	1867, 1930	Gothic Revival	6	
Elizabeth Street
2115 Woodward Avenue	The Fillmore Detroit (formerly State/Palms Theatre) / Palms Building		Theatre/Nightclub with Offices	1925	Gothic Revival	12	Building housing the theatre is named the Palms Building
2125 Woodward Avenue	Little Caesars world headquarters expansion		Office Building	2018 (est.)	Modern	9	
Columbia Street
2211 Woodward Avenue	Fox Theatre		Theatre and Offices	1928	Art Deco	10	Largest "Fox Theatre" in United States
Montcalm Street
2301 Woodward	City Theatre		Restaurant/Theatre	2004	Modern	3	
2326 Woodward	St. John's Episcopal Church		Episcopal Church	1861	Gothic Revival	3	
Fisher Freeway (Interstate 75)
2645 Woodward	Little Caesars Arena		Arena and Offices	2017	Modern	4	
Unknown addresses		Brush Park	subdivision	1800s	Victorian	NA	
3424 Woodward		Bonstelle Theatre	Theatre	1903	Beaux-Arts, Neoclassical		Home of Temple Beth El until 1922 when the congregation moved to 8801 Woodward and the building was converted to a theatre; purchased by Wayne State University in 1956.
100 East Mack Avenue		Red Cross of Southeast Michigan	health center, offices	1973	Modern	3	
Martin Luther King, Jr. Boulevard | Mack Avenue
3501 Woodward Avenue	Orchestra Tower		Apartment building		Modern	11	
3663 Woodward Avenue	Orchestra Place		Offices/Classrooms	1997	Modern	5	Part of the Orchestra Place Complex, which includes the 6-floor Detroit School of Arts. Houses offices for the University of Michigan Detroit Centre, Detroit Medical Centre, and Detroit School of Arts.
Parsons Street
3711 Woodward Avenue	Orchestra Hall (Max M. Fisher Music Center)		Concert hall	1919, 2003	Italianate, Modern	4	Home of the Detroit Symphony Orchestra
3800 Woodward Avenue		Professional Plaza Tower	Apartment building	1964–66	International Style	12	Currently under renovation
Alexandrine Street
4 East Alexandrine		Bicentennial Tower	Apartment building	1976	Modern	12	
3390 John R		Detroit Medical Center	Hospital Complex	1921–1997	various	>10	Complex of six hospitals, affiliated clinics, partner institutions and Wayne State University Medical School
4126 Woodward		Majestic Theatre	Theatre, Bowling Lanes, restaurant	1915, 1934	Art Deco	3	
Canfield Street
4221 Woodward Avenue	David Whitney House		restaurant	1894	Romanesque Revival	3	Constructed as a residence, previously housed offices, converted to a restaurant in 1986
4501 Woodward Avenue	Studio 1 Apartments		apartment building	2007	modern	5	Constructed in partnership with Wayne State University; features one and two bedroom apartments on the upper floors with retail at street level
4612 Woodward Avenue		Edwin S. George Building	apartment building	1908, 1914		5	The structure was renamed the Garfield Building in 1914
Forest Avenue
33 East Forest		First Congregational Church	Congregational church	1891	Romanesque Revival/Byzantine		
Hancock Street
4800 Woodward		Cathedral Church of St. Paul	Episcopal church, school	1905, 1951	Gothic Revival		
Warren Avenue
100 East Farnsworth		Rackham Memorial Building	University classrooms and offices	1938	Art Deco	3	Home of the University of Michigan Horace H. Rackham School of Graduate Studies
5035 Woodward Avenue	Samuel L. Smith House		Offices	1889	Queen Anne	4	Part of Wayne State University
5057 Woodward Avenue	Maccabees Building		Offices, classrooms	1927	Art Deco, Romanesque Revival	15	Part of Wayne State University
5200 Woodward Avenue		Detroit Institute of Arts	Art museum	1927, 1966, 1971, 2007	Beaux-Arts, Renaissance Revival	5?	Second-largest municipally owned museum in the United States
5201 Woodward Avenue	Detroit Public Library		Library	1921, 1963	Renaissance Revival, International	5	
Kirby Street
5401 Woodward Avenue	Detroit Historical Museum		museum	1951	International	4	Has two floors of galleries above ground and one below; the third floor houses administrative offices
15 East Kirby Street		The Park Shelton	condominiums	1926	Chicago school, Italianate	12	Opened as a residential hotel; converted to apartments in the 1970s and to condominiums in 2004
Ferry Street
5510 Woodward Avenue		Col. Frank J. Hecker House	offices	1888	French Châteauesque	3	Served as residence to the Hecker family until 1947 and a music store until 1990, restored and converted to offices in 1990
71 East Ferry Avenue		Charles Lang Freer House	offices	1887	Queen Anne; Shingle Style	3	Freer was business partner of Frank Hecker; the structure originally housed the Peacock Room by James McNeill Whistler; Has housed offices for Merrill-Palmer Institute since 1923
Edsel Ford Freeway (Interstate 94)
5930 Woodward Avenue		Our Lady of the Rosary Church	Roman Catholic Church	1896, 1907	Romanesque Revival	2	Constructed as St. Joseph's Episcopal Church in 1896 and purchased by a Catholic congregation in 1907
11 West Baltimore Avenue	Detroit Amtrak station		Train station	1988			
Grand Boulevard; Site of first traffic light in Michigan
Chandler Street| Delaware Street
8000 Woodward Avenue		Metropolitan United Methodist Church	Church	1926	Gothic Revival	7 (bell tower)	Houses the second largest pipe organ in Michigan
Philadelphia Street
8501 Woodward Avenue		Woodward Avenue Presbyterian Church	vacant	1911	Gothic Revival		
8801 Woodward Avenue		Bethel Community Transformation Center	Church	1921–1922	Neoclassical		Home of congregation of Temple Beth El until 1974
Boston Boulevard
9944 Woodward Avenue		Cathedral of the Most Blessed Sacrament	church	1913–1951	Gothic Revival		Sanctuary completed in 1930 and selected as cathedral in 1937; towers and facade completed in 1951
Davison Freeway (M-8)
91 Manchester Avenue		Highland Park Ford Plant	Automobile plant	1908–1910	Unknown (Industrial)	4	Currently stores documents and artifacts from the Henry Ford Museum, as the plant has not been in use since 1978 (activity shifted to the River Rouge Complex in the 1920s, trim activity continued until 1978)
West McNichols Road
19013 Woodward	Palmer Park		Park and Golf course	1924	Unknown	?	U.S. Senator Thomas Witherell Palmer donated 140-acre (57 ha) to establish the park in 1893 that now encompasses 296-acre (120 ha) and houses a golf course, picnic areas, playgrounds, a log cabin and a fountain honoring local businessman Charles Merrill
West Seven Mile Road
19807 Woodward		Evergreen Cemetery	Cemetery	1905	Unknown	2 (mausoleum)	
19975 Woodward	Woodlawn Cemetery		Cemetery	1895	Gothic Revival	2 (mausoleum)	
West State Fair Avenue
1120 West State Fair Avenue		Michigan State Fairgrounds Coliseum	Michigan State Fair fairgrounds	1922	Italianate	3	
West Eight Mile Road (M-102)

== See also ==
- Detroit Financial District
- Lower Woodward Avenue Historic District
- Midtown Woodward Historic District
- Religious Structures of Woodward Avenue Thematic Resource
