= Frank & Seder Building =

Frank & Seder Building may refer to:

- Frank & Seder Building (Detroit)
- Frank & Seder Building (Pittsburgh)
