= Lower Woodward Avenue Historic District =

Historic district in Michigan, United States

- U.S. National Register of Historic Places
- U.S. Historic district
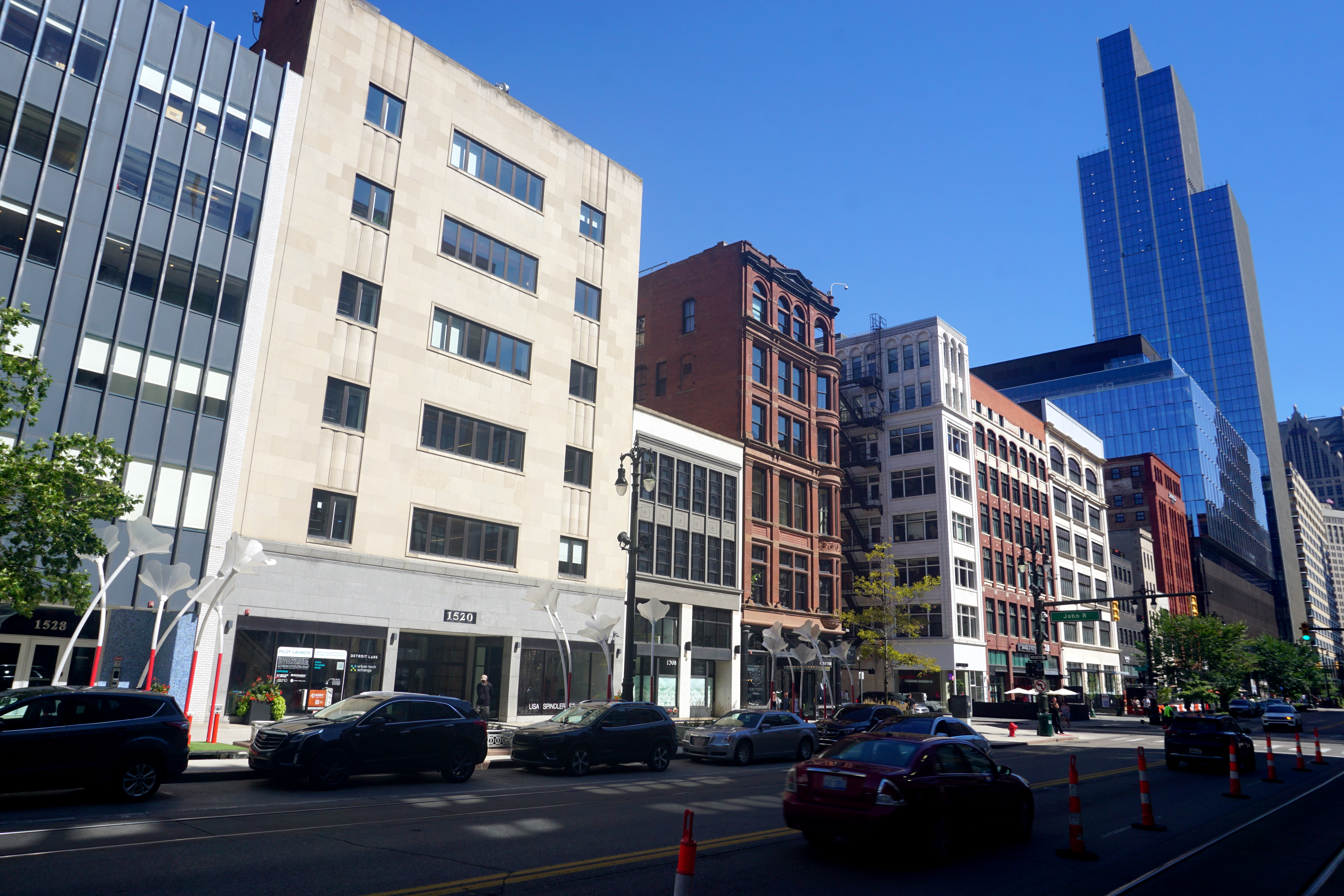
- Detroit's Historic Merchant's Row along Woodward Avenue
- Interactive map
- Location: Detroit, Michigan, U.S.
- Coordinates: 42°20′3″N 83°2′56″W
- Architect: Albert Kahn, Gordon W. Lloyd, et al.
- Architectural style: Early Commercial, Late Victorian
- NRHP reference No.: 99000051
- Added to NRHP: February 12, 1999

The Lower Woodward Avenue Historic District, also known as Merchant's Row, is a mixed-use retail, commercial, and residential district in downtown Detroit, Michigan, located between Campus Martius Park and Grand Circus Park Historic District at 1201 through 1449 Woodward Avenue (two blocks between State Street to Clifford Street) and 1400 through 1456 Woodward Avenue (one block between Grand River Avenue and Clifford Street). The district was listed on the National Register of Historic Places in 1999.

== History ==
The Lower Woodward Avenue Historic District contains thirty-four commercial buildings built at the end of the nineteenth century and the beginning of the twentieth, many by architects. By the 1920s, this area of the city was one of the most active shopping districts in the nation; in 1925, the State and Woodward intersection was the most active pedestrian crossing corner in the U.S.

Many famous and historic Detroit businesses either began or had flagship stores in or near the district, including Vernors, Sanders Confectionery, Winkelman's, S.S. Kresge Co., F. W. Woolworth Company, and Hudson's. In 2011, the Forbes Company which owns the upscale Somerset Collection mall in the suburb of Troy debuted a group of seasonal pop-up mini-shops called Somerset Collection CityLoft on Merchant's Row as part of 'Downtown Detroit Days', generally open the last Thursday through Saturday of the month from June through August, and occasionally September. Michigan-based outdoor outfitter Moosejaw has opened a Detroit location along Merchant's Row at 1275 Woodward Avenue. The Elliott Building located at 1403 Woodward Ave. began re-development in July 2016 and was opened to residential tenants in December 2017.

Major retailers have started moving into spaces that recently were empty. Under Armour, Nike, Warby Parker, Bonobos, John Varvatos, and Lululemon Athletica all have a presence on lower Woodward Avenue. Shinola is currently redeveloping and constructing a new Shinola-themed hotel at 1400 Woodward. G-Star Raw plans on opening a store along Woodward sometime in 2018. Dan Gilbert has started construction on a skyscraper (yet to be named) at the Hudson's department store site. It's set to be completed by 2022. He is also responsible for purchasing and renovating many of the buildings these retailers have moved into.

=== Elliott Building ===
Architect: Wilson Brothers & Company of Philadelphia Original address: 207-211 Woodward Ave. The Elliott Building is listed on the National Register of Historic Places as a contributing building in the Lower Woodward Avenue Historic District.

The Elliott Building was added to the northwest corner of Grand River Ave and Woodward Avenue. (Barns Block) in 1894 at the cost of about $80,000. The 6-story building, designed with distinctive red brick and red terra cotta is located on the site of the home of Detroit's first Mayor, General John R. Williams. John R. Street was named in his honor. Where once a white picket fence surrounded the mayor's home, the Elliott Building was constructed to house the mercantile business run by William H. Elliott. The building served as the locale of The William H. Elliott Dry Goods Store which provided carpets, draperies, and children's clothing until 1909. In 1910, William H. Elliott Company consolidated with the Taylor-Woolfenden Company under the name of Elliott-Taylor-Woolfenden Company and operated in the building until a new building was erected on the southwest corner of Woodward Ave. and Henry St. in May 1911.

S. S. Kresge Corporation’s operated in the Elliott Building starting in the late teens as a "25 cent to $1" green front store. This Kresge location carried higher-priced merchandise compared to the nearby Kresge Store #1 (a 5 and 10 cent store at 1201 Woodward Ave.). In 1939 after a modernization, the store changed to a "5 cent to $1" store. In 1951, a "root beer department" was installed. The S.S. Kresge Co.’s located in the Elliott Building closed December 31, 1959 after an inability to negotiate a new lease. In 1961-1969 a portion of the basement was used as a gym/health center. Butler's Shoes was located in the northern storefront in the late 1970s. Later in the ‘70's, a women's clothing chain House of Nine occupied the 2nd floor. The last tenant in the building was Eastern Wigs and Beauty Supply who occupied the first floor until September 1997. Today ownership belongs to Elliott Building, LLC. The building began re-development in July 2016 and was expected to complete in early 2017. The Elliott Building will contain twenty-three one and two bedroom apartments ranging from approximately 700 square feet to nearly 2,000 square feet. The six apartments that are at the rear of the building will have balconies. The four apartments that occupy the 6th floor will be 2-story. Approximately 16,000 square-feet of retail space will occupy the first floor, basement and sub-basement.

== Construction ==
Most of the structures in the district are of steel frame construction with a front windowed facade finished with brownstone, white brick, white terra cotta, or red brick. They all stand wall-to-wall, filling the lot lines and fronting directly on the sidewalk. Most were originally designed to house retail on the first floor and offices on the upper floors.

== Gallery ==
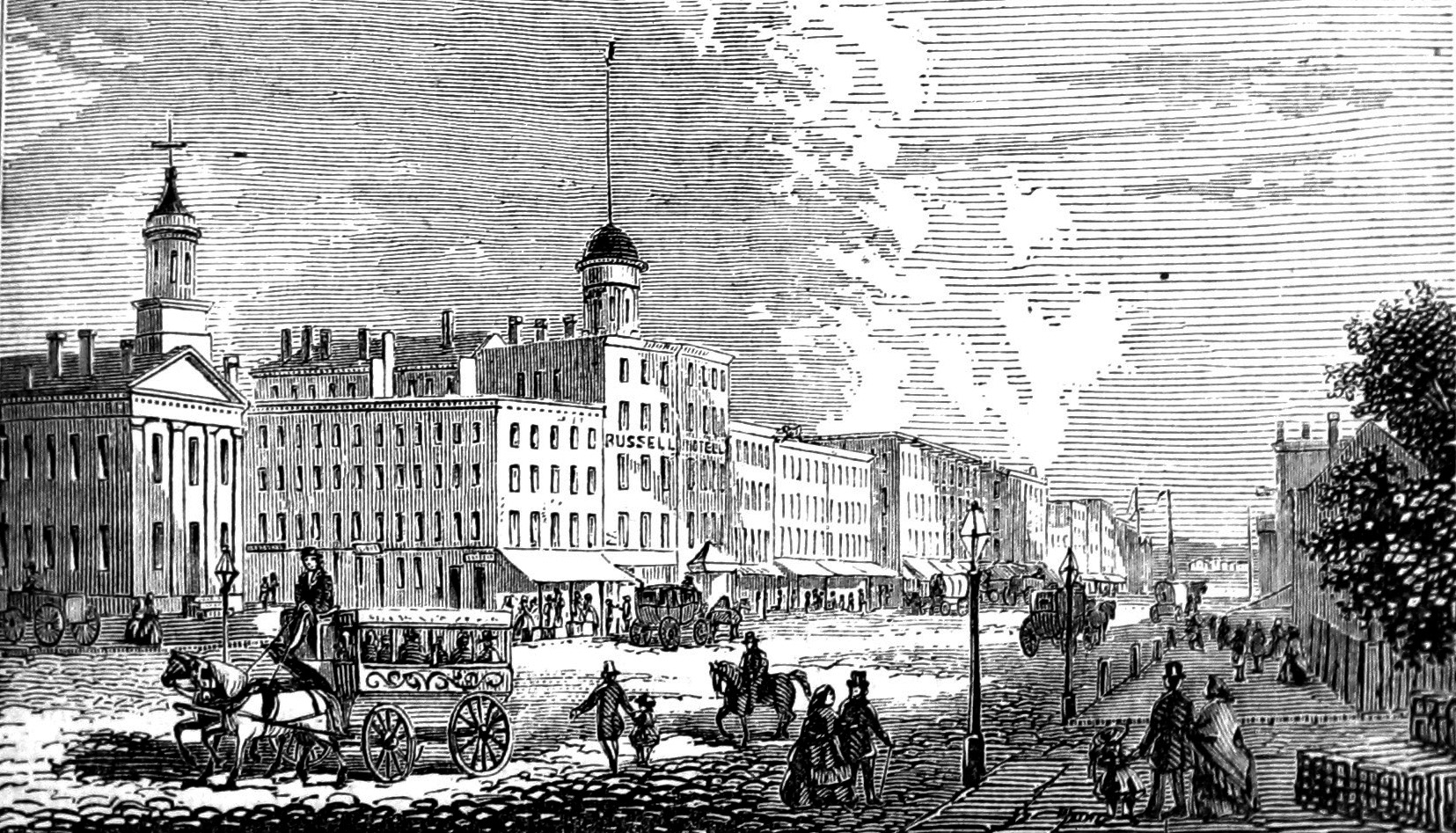
Woodward Avenue shopping district, 1865

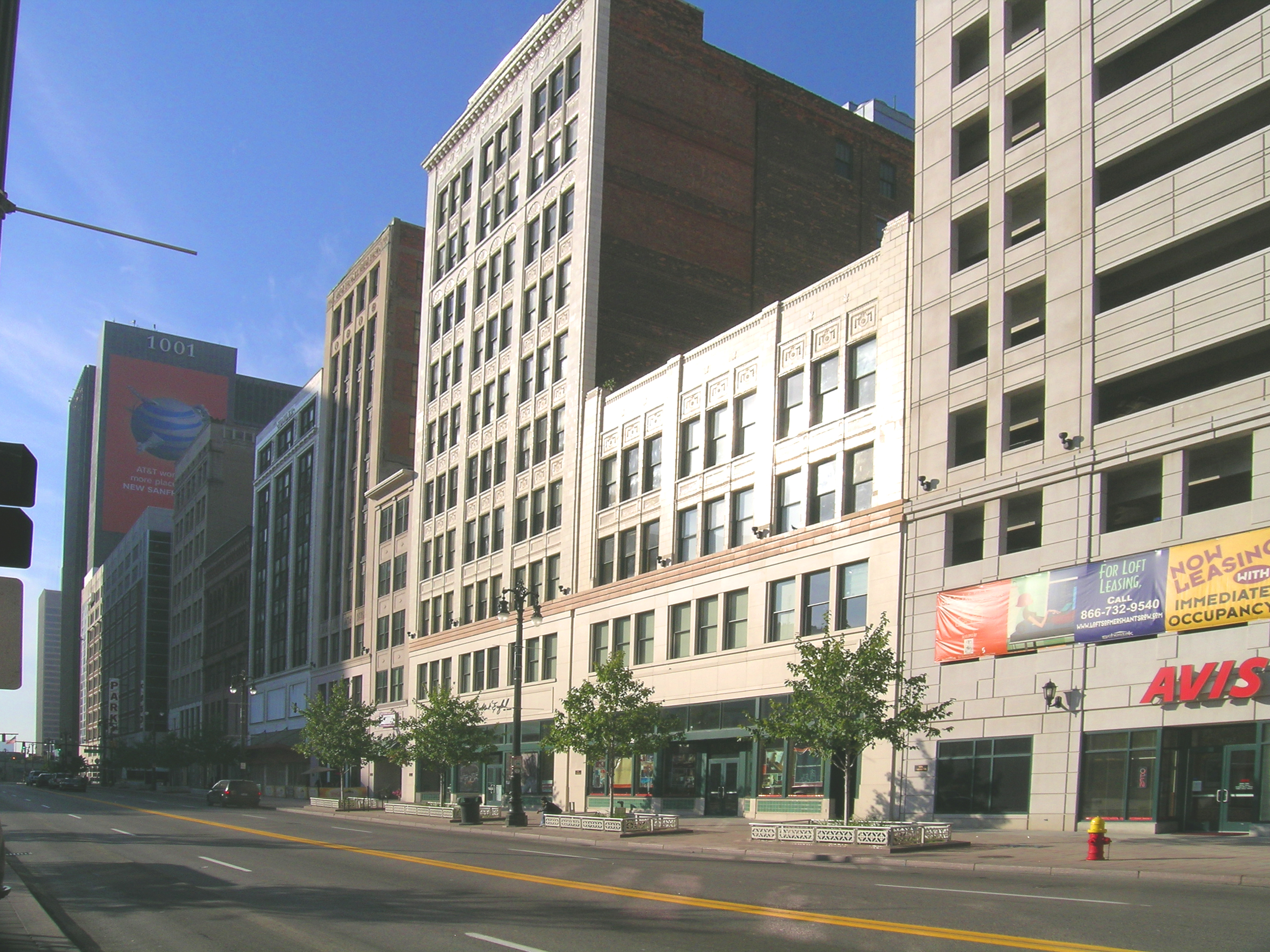
1201-1399 Woodward (between State Street and Grand River Avenue)

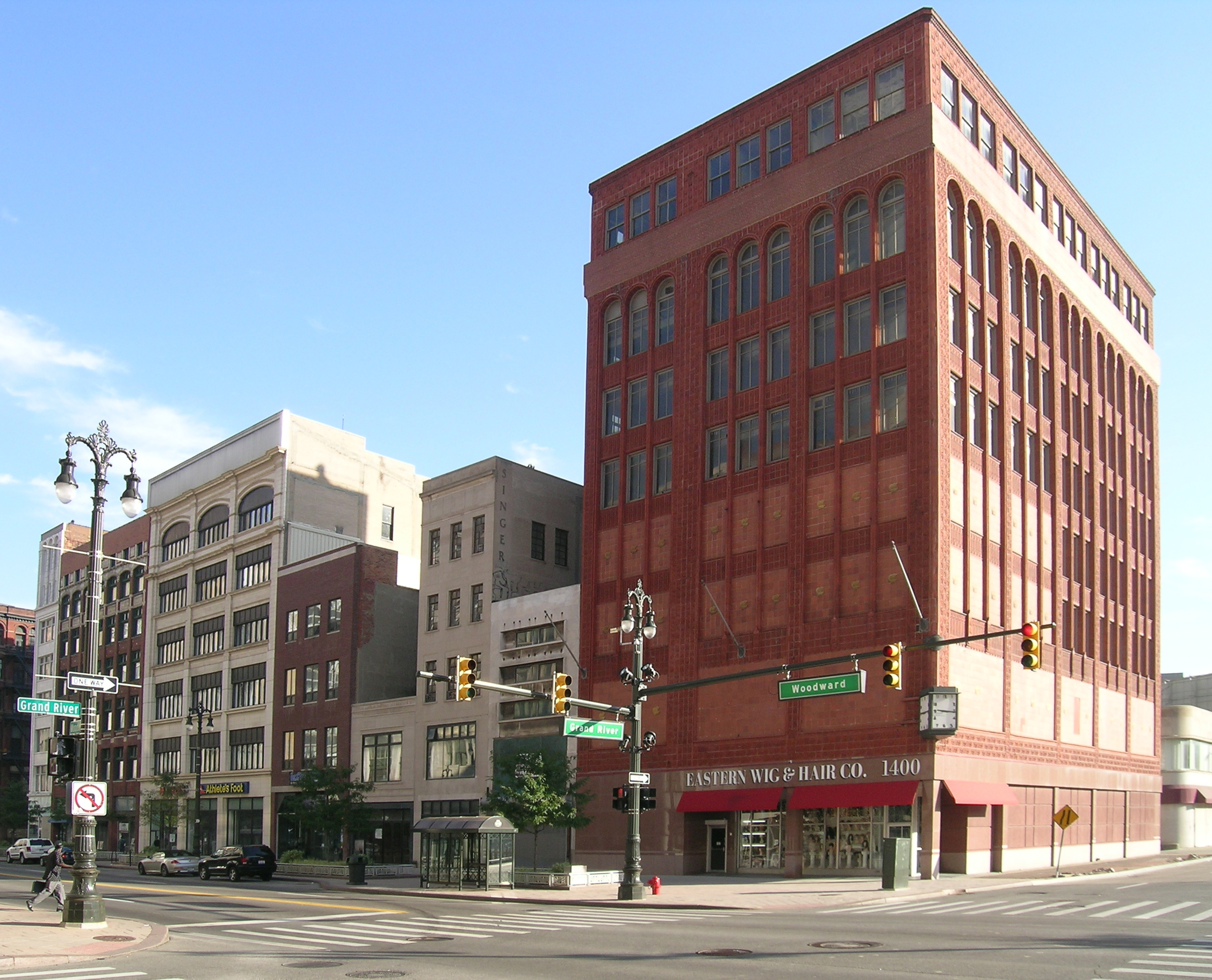
1400-1456 Woodward (between Grand River Avenue and Clifford Street)

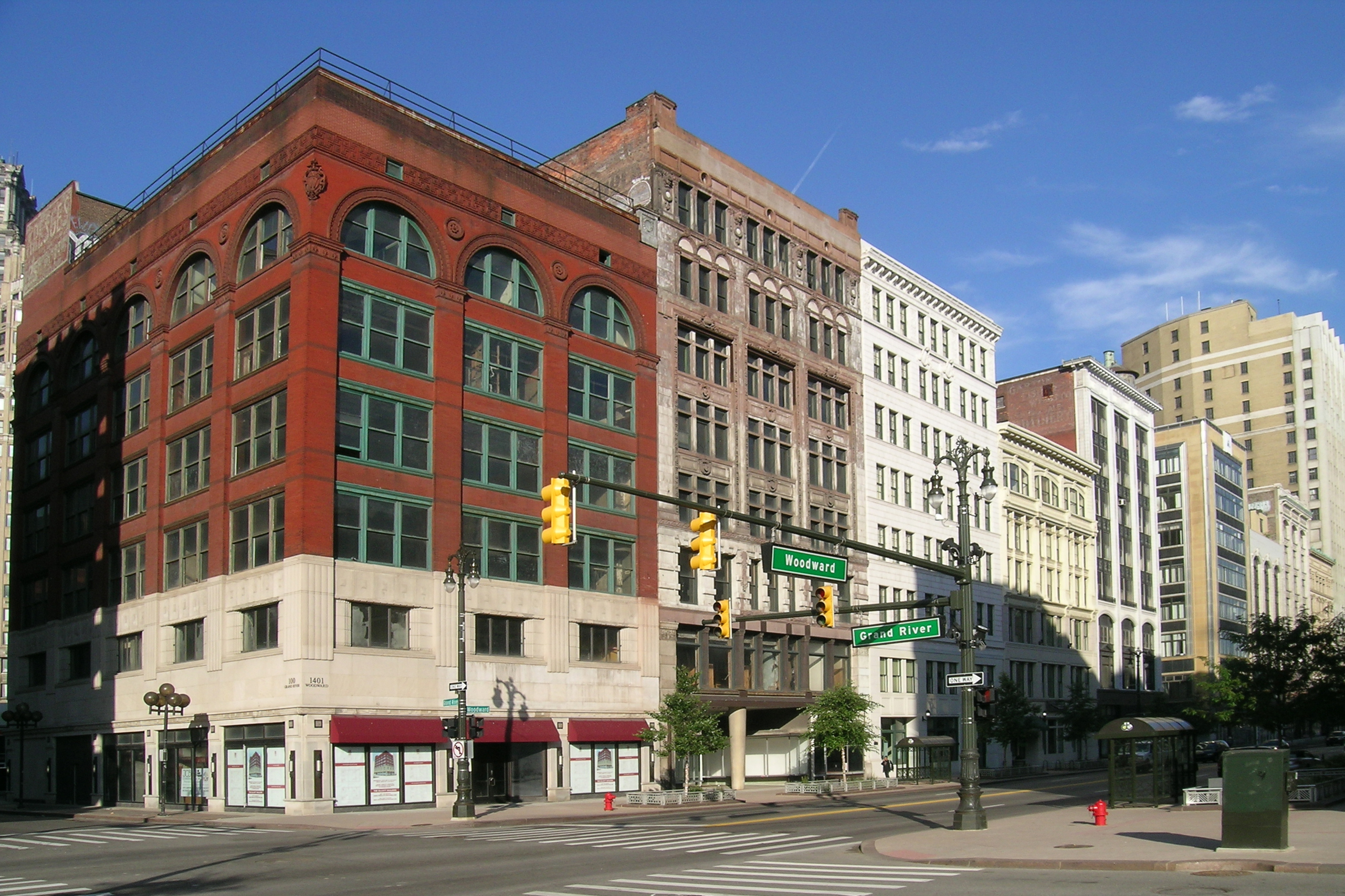
1401-1449 Woodward (between Grand River Avenue and Clifford Street)

== See also ==
- Frank & Seder Building
- J. L. Hudson Department Store and Addition
- List of buildings located along Woodward Avenue, Detroit
