= Pittsburgh Central Downtown Historic District =

Historic district in Pennsylvania, United States

- Pittsburgh Central Downtown; Historic District
- U.S. National Register of Historic Places
- U.S. Historic district
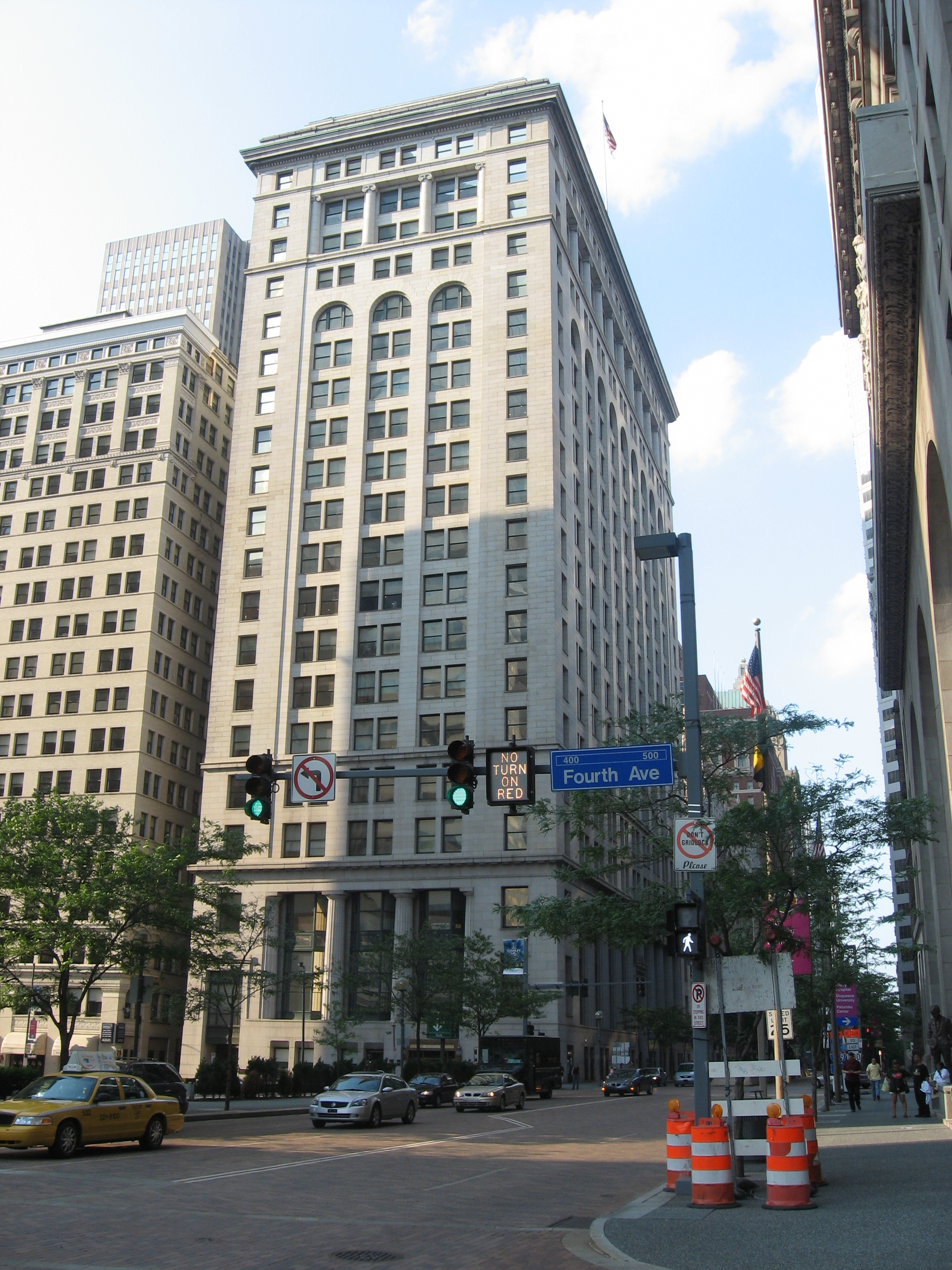
- The Frick Building

- Location within Pennsylvania
- Location: Roughly bounded by Liberty Avenue, Grant Street, Forbes Avenue, and Wood Street, Pittsburgh, Pennsylvania
- Coordinates: 40°26′29″N 79°59′50″W
- Architect: Multiple
- Architectural style: Art Deco, Late Victorian, Gothic Revival
- NRHP reference No.: 85003216 and 13000251
- Added to NRHP: December 17, 1985 (original) and May 2, 2013 (increase)

The Pittsburgh Central Downtown Historic District is a historic district in the Central Business District of Pittsburgh, Pennsylvania, United States. It is composed of multiple late eighteenth-century buildings which illustrate "Pittsburgh's emergence during that period as a preeminent industrial and business center," according to Hyman Myers, the former chair of the Pennsylvania Historic Preservation Board.

Bounded by Wood Street, Forbes Avenue, Grant Street, and Liberty Avenue, it was listed on the National Register of Historic Places on December 17, 1985. Its boundaries were expanded on May 2, 2013.

== History ==
Listed on the National Register of Historic Places on December 17, 1985, the original Pittsburgh Central Downtown Historic District was composed of twenty-six buildings, twenty of which were considered contributing, including a few small former residences built in the mid-19th century.

The Frick Building and U.S. Post Office and Courthouse are contributing properties and were also listed separately on the National Register of Historic Places.

Other notable contributing properties include the Gulf Tower, the William Penn Hotel, the Oliver Building, Mellon Square, the August Wilson Center, the Federal Reserve Bank Branch, the Frank & Seder Building, the Koppers Building and Trinity Cathedral.

The district's boundaries were expanded on May 2, 2013.
