= Himelhoch's =

Department store

Himelhoch's was a department store in Michigan, United States. Wolf Himelhoch was a Jewish-Latvian emigrant from Courland, part of the Russian Empire that is now Latvia. He started the company in the 1870s in the Michigan Thumb, selling merchandise on a pushcart between Caro and Bay City. Wolf opened a store in Caro in 1876, later expanded by his father Israel and three uncles. Recognizing the demand for high-end women's fashion in Detroit, the family opened a small store on Woodward Avenue in Detroit in 1907. In 1923, they moved to the seven-story NRHP-listed Washington Arcade Building at 1545 Woodward Avenue designed by architect Albert Kahn, with marble-faced walls on the third story, and mahogany floors on the third and fifth floors. Himelhoch's opened branches in Birmingham, Michigan (1950), Grosse Pointe (1952), and Northland Center in Southfield (1954). However, due to the dispersal of sales across multiple branches, Himelhoch's found itself unable to keep an inventory of luxury goods or take risks stocking new trendy items. resulting in an ever more conservative product selection. The chain lost momentum over time, closing the bridal, shoe, children's, fur, and cosmetics departments. In 1979, Himelhoch's filed for Chapter 11 bankruptcy and closed their stores. The Detroit flagship building is now an apartment building, the Himelhoch Apartments. The last CEO of the brick-and-mortar stores, Charles Himelhoch, who held that position for three decades, died in 2020. Carol Himelhoch is now president of Himelhoch's which reopened in 2018 as an online luxury clothing retailer.
