= Frank & Seder Building (Pittsburgh) =

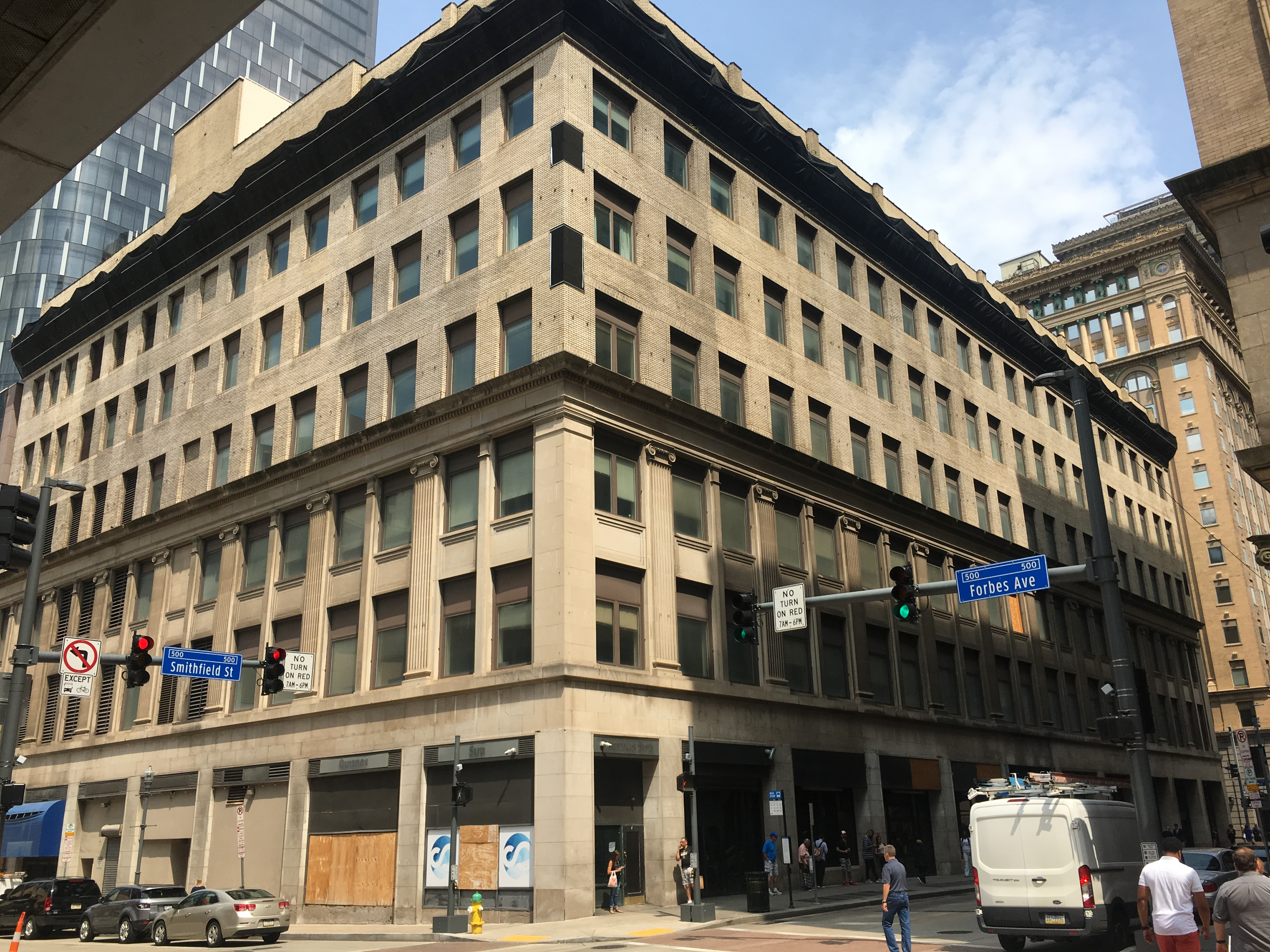
- Former names: Frank & Seder Department Store Building

General information
- Status: Completed
- Type: Commercial
- Architectural style: Classical Revival
- Location: 441 Smithfield Street; Pittsburgh, Pennsylvania, U.S.
- Coordinates: 40.4396°N 79.9991°W
- Completed: May 21, 1918
- Owner: Stark Enterprises
- Operator: Stark Enterprises

Height
- Roof: 30 m (98 ft)

Technical details
- Floor count: 7
- Floor area: 286,000 sq ft (26,600 m^{2})

Design and construction
- Architects: Charles Bickel, MacClure & Spahr, and William E. Snaman
- Developer: Frank & Seder Department Store

The Frank & Seder Building is a 30-metre (98 ft), 7-story, former department store building completed in 1918 on Smithfield Street in downtown Pittsburgh, Pennsylvania, United States. The building is a contributing structure in the Pittsburgh Central Downtown Historic District.

As of 2019, the historic building is being renovated as a mixed-use facility, Smith & Fifth, with 40 apartments on the upper two levels, 160,000 square feet (15,000 m^{2}) of office space, and 25,000 square feet (2,300 m^{2}) of retail space spread over the first 2 floors, and underground parking.

== Frank & Seder ==
Russian Jewish immigrants Isaac Seder and Jacob H. Frank started a wholesale women's wear business in the early 1900s, then switched to retail, opening a downtown Pittsburgh store in 1907. The business grew, expanding into a department store, and adding locations in New York City, Philadelphia and Detroit.

The Pittsburgh Frank & Seder building was expanded in 1913. On January 27, 1917 a fire engulfed the retail shopping district in downtown Pittsburgh bordered by Wood St, Forbes Ave, Smithfield St, and 5th Ave. The Frank & Seder department store at 344 Fifth Avenue was completely destroyed, the Grand Opera House, the Hilton Clothing Company and a dozen other businesses were significantly damaged. The Frank & Seder building damages were valued at $600,000, total losses were valued at $4 million. Even though Frank & Seder sustained a complete loss of the building they had been in since 1907, construction of a new building began shortly after and was completed in 1918.

Several labor organizations staged strikes, accompanied by violence, against Frank & Seder and four other major Pittsburgh retailers from 1953 to 1954.

National Department Stores acquired the Frank & Seder group of stores in 1923, including Frank & Seder, Inc. (Pittsburgh); Lewin-Nieman Co. (Pittsburgh); Fink Co. (Philadelphia); Frank A Seder Co. of Philadelphia and Frank & Seder Co. of Detroit.

The Pittsburgh Frank & Seder store closed in 1958.

== Redevelopment history ==
In May 2012 Oxford Development Company, then owner of the Frank & Seder building, unveiled plans to replace the building with a 33-story, $238 million tower named 350 Fifth Ave (updating the current 441 Smithfield address).

Oxford revised the project twice, in 2014 reducing the height to 20 stories and in early 2015 changing to 29 stories with eight stories of parking and a $200 million budget. Although Pittsburgh had an office occupancy rate over 94% at the time, Oxford was unable to secure the two large tenants of over 150,000 square feet (14,000 m^{2}) to start construction on the proposed 532,000 square feet (49,400 m^{2}) tower.

Oxford eventually abandoned the project and sold the building to Stark Enterprises in January 2017 for $10.4 million. Stark plans a $63 million redevelopment of the building into 160,000 square feet (15,000 m^{2}) of office space spread over three floors, with 40 apartments on the upper two levels, and 25,000 square feet (2,300 m^{2}) of retail space spread over the first 2 floors, and underground parking. The project was announced as Icon on Smithfield, but was changed to Smith & Fifth in 2019.

== See also ==
- Frank & Seder Building (Detroit)
