= Professional Plaza Tower =

- U.S. National Register of Historic Places
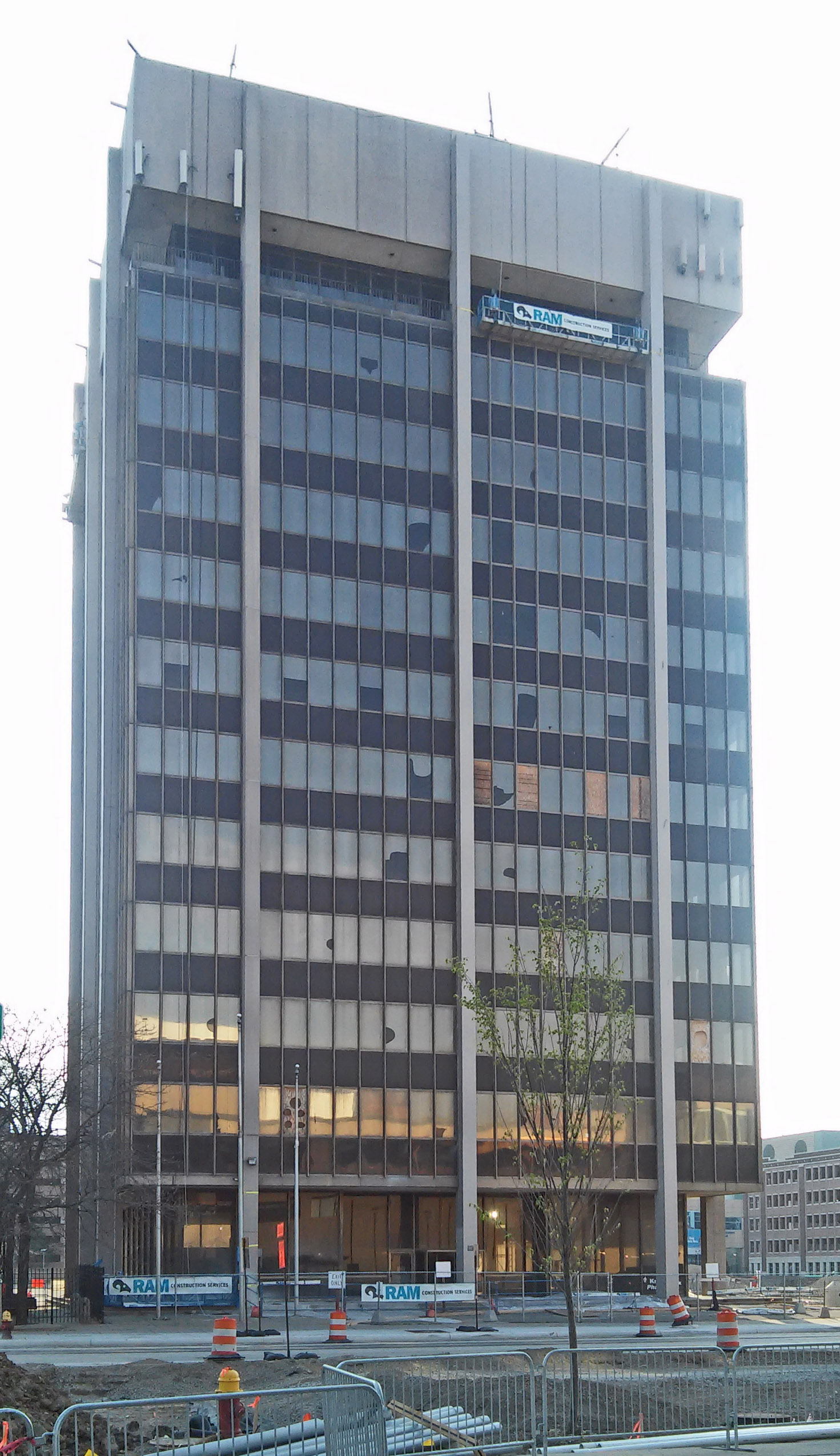
- Interactive map
- Location: 3800 Woodward Avenue; Detroit, Michigan
- Coordinates: 42°20′58″N 83°03′33″W
- Built: 1964–66
- Architect: Crane and Gorwic
- Architectural style: International Style
- NRHP reference No.: 16000182
- Added to NRHP: April 19, 2016

The Professional Plaza Tower, also known as the 'Hammer and Nail' building due to its two iconic illuminated signs (now removed), is a high-rise building located at 3800 Woodward Avenue in Midtown Detroit, Michigan. It was listed on the National Register of Historic Places in 2016.

== History ==
The Professional Plaza Tower was built as part of the ambitious Detroit Medical Center urban renewal plan carried out in the 1960s. The project, which envisioned a peripheral ring of residential and commercial buildings, including three neighboring twelve-story towers, surrounding the central hospital complex, was never fully realized; however the Professional Plaza Tower, constructed between 1964 and 1966 to house the offices of physicians, surgeons, and dentists, succeeded in bringing medical professionals back into the city, and rapidly established itself as an anchor to the Medical Center.

The tower went vacant in 2014, when its last tenants moved out. Slated for demolition, it was bought by Detroit-based Roxbury Group in January 2015, and reopened in October 2017 after a $22 million renovation which turned it into a 72-unit residential apartment with ground floor retail.

== Architecture ==
The tower stands twelve stories high and has a square footprint. It was designed by architects Gerald Crane and Norbert Gorwic in the International Style. The largely unaltered exterior consists of a glass and aluminum curtain wall, punctuated on each of the four sides with three concrete columns extending from the base to the roof. The first and twelfth floors are recessed, and the penthouse is faced with precast concrete panels. The main feature of the building were two neon signs, each consisting of three hammers and a nail, displayed on the penthouse walls of the north and south façades. The signs were installed in the 1980s, when the Carpenters Union occupied the top two floors of the tower, and taken down in 2016: one was returned to the Union, while the other was restored and is now displayed in the building's lobby.
