= Frank & Seder Building (Detroit) =

Lofts of Merchants Row
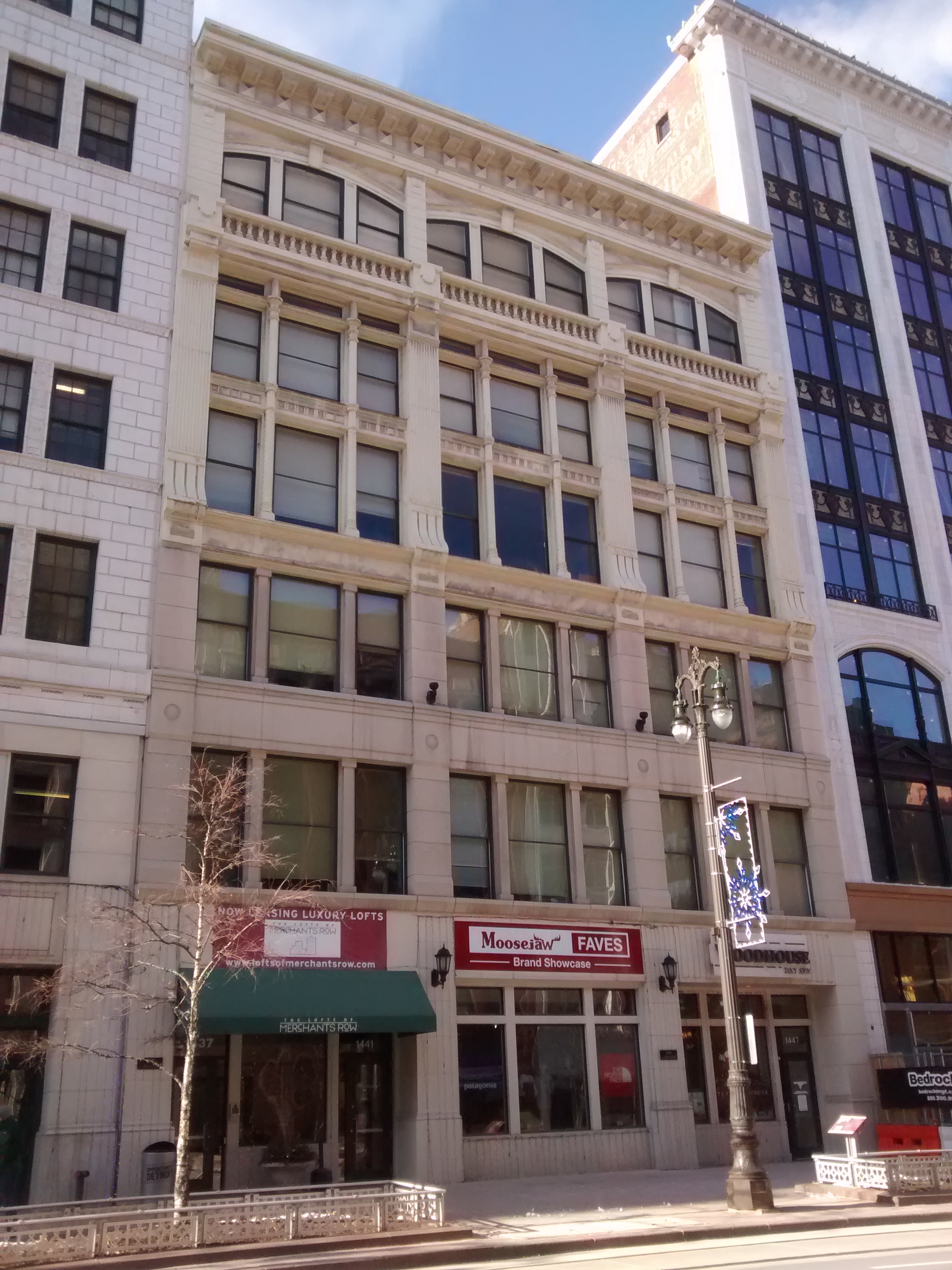
- Former names: Frank & Seder Department Store Building

General information
- Status: Completed
- Type: Residential condominium
- Architectural style: Chicago school
- Location: 1447 Woodward Avenue; Detroit, Michigan
- Coordinates: 42.33463°N 83.04958°W
- Completed: 1881

Height
- Roof: 41 m (135 ft)

Technical details
- Floor count: 6

Design and construction
- Architect: Kramer Design Group (renovation)

Other information
- Number of units: 28

The Lofts of Merchants Row, formerly the Frank & Seder Department Store Building, is a 41 m (135 ft) 6-storey high-rise completed in 1891 on Woodward Avenue in downtown Detroit, Michigan. The building was the tallest in the state when built, and later joined with the larger addition directly to the south in 1921. The upper part of the facade is cast iron, reputedly the last such facade in Detroit.

== Frank & Seder ==
Russian Jewish immigrants Isaac Seder and Jacob H. Frank started a wholesale women's wear business in the early 1900s, then switched to retail, opening a downtown Pittsburgh store in 1907. The business grew, expanding into a department store, and adding locations in New York City, Philadelphia and Detroit.

The Pittsburgh Frank & Seder was expanded in 1913, but destroyed by fire in 1917 at a loss of $600,000; its replacement was completed in 1918.

The first Frank & Seder Philadelphia store opened in 1915, reopened in 1925 with 250,000 ft^{2} (23,000 m^{2}), and was joined by a 60,000 ft^{2} (5,600 m^{2}) branch store for women's wear in 1929. F&S built an eight-story Detroit store on Woodward Avenue with 180-foot frontage and financial capital of $3,000,000; "one unit" of the store opened in April 1921 while construction was apparently ongoing. An initial design called for a 12-story building, 120 by 150 feet, reinforced concrete, brick, and steel.

National Department Stores acquired the Frank & Seder group of stores in 1923, including Frank & Seder, Inc. (Pittsburgh); Lewin-Nieman Co. (Pittsburgh); Fink Co. (Philadelphia); Frank A Seder Co. of Philadelphia and Frank & Seder Co. of Detroit.

In 1921, Frank & Seder leased store space (five floors and basement) of the Marbridge Building at 34th Street and 6th Avenue, New York City, made available in September of that year.

The Detroit store became the subject of a sit-down strike in 1937 when 11 men entered in the evening, then called for the store's 550 employees to protest labor conditions, related to the widespread strikes taking place at Detroit automakers and suppliers during the previous week. After 300 police, the state governor, and city mayor arrived on scene and the 43 remaining sitters were evicted, warrants were issued for their arrest, some of whom were revealed to have criminal records.

The Philadelphia branch store was closed in 1949 after losing its lease to a competing store. In 1950, the Philadelphia main store offered free Saturday afternoon shorts, cartoons, and full-length movies for children, as a babysitting service for shoppers, and later the same year, sponsored the WCAU-TV broadcast of TV Spelling B.

The chain closed its Detroit store in 1951, and its remaining Philadelphia store in 1953. Several labor organizations staged strikes, accompanied by violence, against Frank & Seder and four other major Pittsburgh retailers from 1953 to 1954. These actions were ruled by the NLRB to be violations of the 1935 National Labor Relations Act. The protests, and the development of suburban shopping centers, imposed financial difficulties on F&S. The Pittsburgh Frank & Seder store closed in 1958, and still stands at the corner of Fifth Avenue and Smithfield St. The Philadelphia store was demolished for a parking garage in 1959.

== See also ==
- Frank & Seder Building (Pittsburgh)
