= Kales Building =

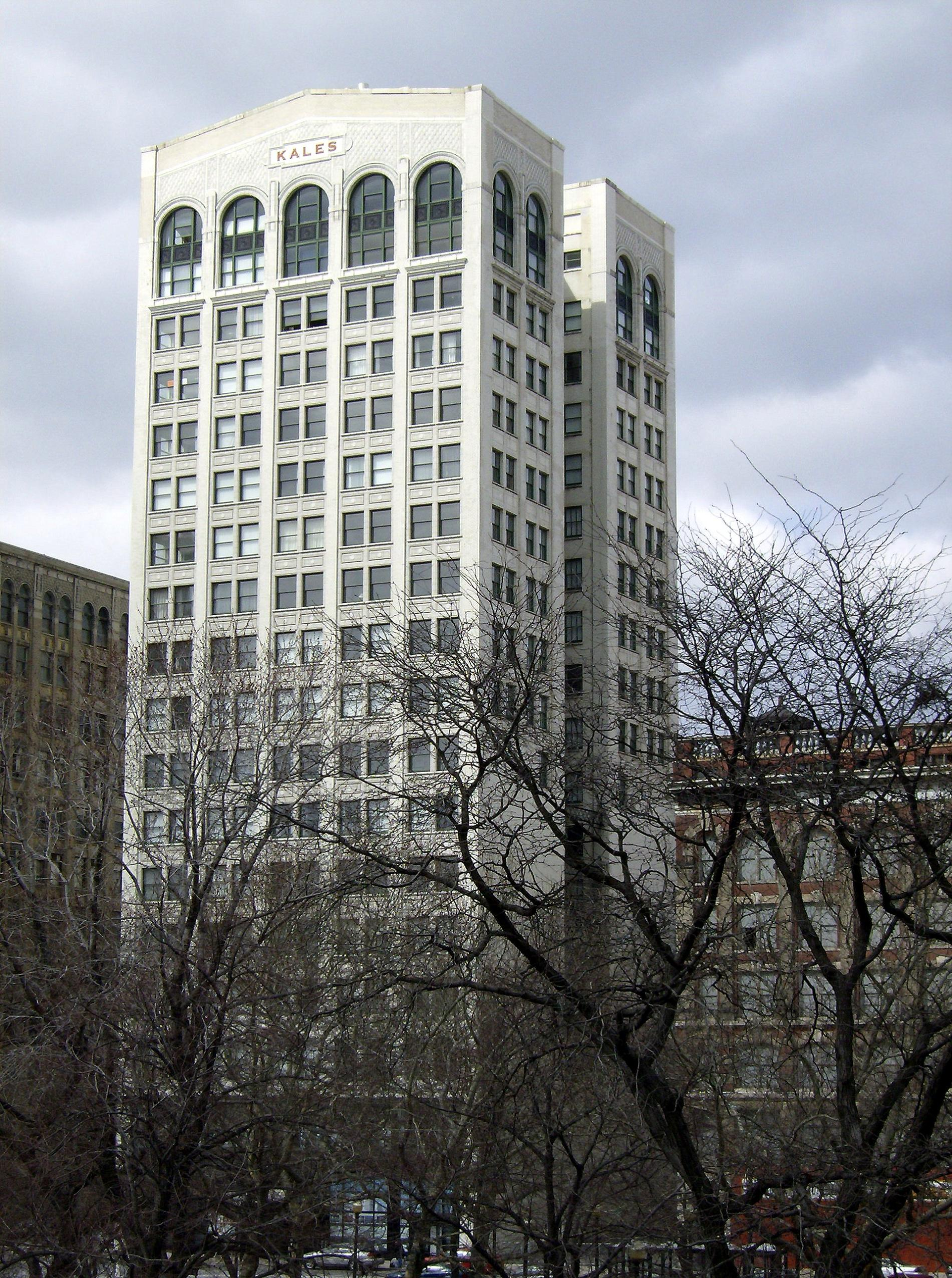
- Interactive map of the Kales Building area

General information
- Type: residential
- Architectural style: Neo-Classical; Neo-Renaissance
- Location: 76 West Adams; Detroit, Michigan
- Coordinates: 42°20′12″N 83°03′09″W
- Completed: 1914
- Renovated: 2003–2004

Height
- Roof: 258 ft (79 m)

Technical details
- Floor count: 18

Design and construction
- Architect: Albert Kahn

Other information
- Public transit: Grand Circus Park; Grand Circus; SMART FAST Woodward 461, 462; DDOT 4 D2A2
- Kales Building
- U.S. Historic district – Contributing property
- Part of: Grand Circus Park Historic District (ID83000894)
- Designated CP: February 28, 1983

The Kales Building is a high-rise apartment building in downtown Detroit, Michigan. It is located 76 West Adams at the northeast corner of Adams Avenue West and Park Avenue, across from Grand Circus Park, in the Foxtown neighborhood, just north of Downtown. The building was designed by Albert Kahn and constructed in 1914, and stands at 18 floors, with one basement floor, for a total of 19 floors in height. It was originally named the Kresge Building and it was given its current name in 1930. Kahn went beyond the typical Chicago School and styled the Kales Building with a clean-lined detail façade with Neo-classical and Renaissance revival elements such as the hipped roof and arched upper windows.

== History ==
When completed in 1914, the Kales Building housed the headquarters of the S.S. Kresge Company, forerunner of retailing giant Kmart. Kresge only occupied 9 of the 18 floors. The rest of the floors were leased out to doctors and dentists and the storefronts included a pharmacy. S.S. Kresge Co. moved out of the building in 1930 for a new headquarters at Cass Park and the old headquarters remained a prime location for medical offices. The last tenant, New York Custom Shoe Shop owned by Antonio Bava, moved out of the building in 1986 and it sat vacant until its restoration in 2004.

== Redevelopment ==
In the 1990s, plans were brought up for the future Ford Field and Comerica Park on the west side of Woodward. Demolition of the Kales Building was considered to make space for parking. The building's future was put in limbo when the proposed stadiums were shifted to the opposite side of Woodward. Then the city requested the Greater Downtown Partnership to try to sell the property to developers. During the summer of 1999 the GDP held 'request for proposals' for the Kales and the nearby Statler Hotel to attract bids from developers planning to redevelop the building into loft apartments. The renovation was announced thereafter and initial cleanup work began in 2000.

The Kales Building was renovated in 2003-2004 into 117 residential units with ground-level retail.
