= Metropolitan Center for High Technology =

- S. S. Kresge World Headquarters
- U.S. National Register of Historic Places
- U.S. Historic district – Contributing property
- Michigan State Historic Site
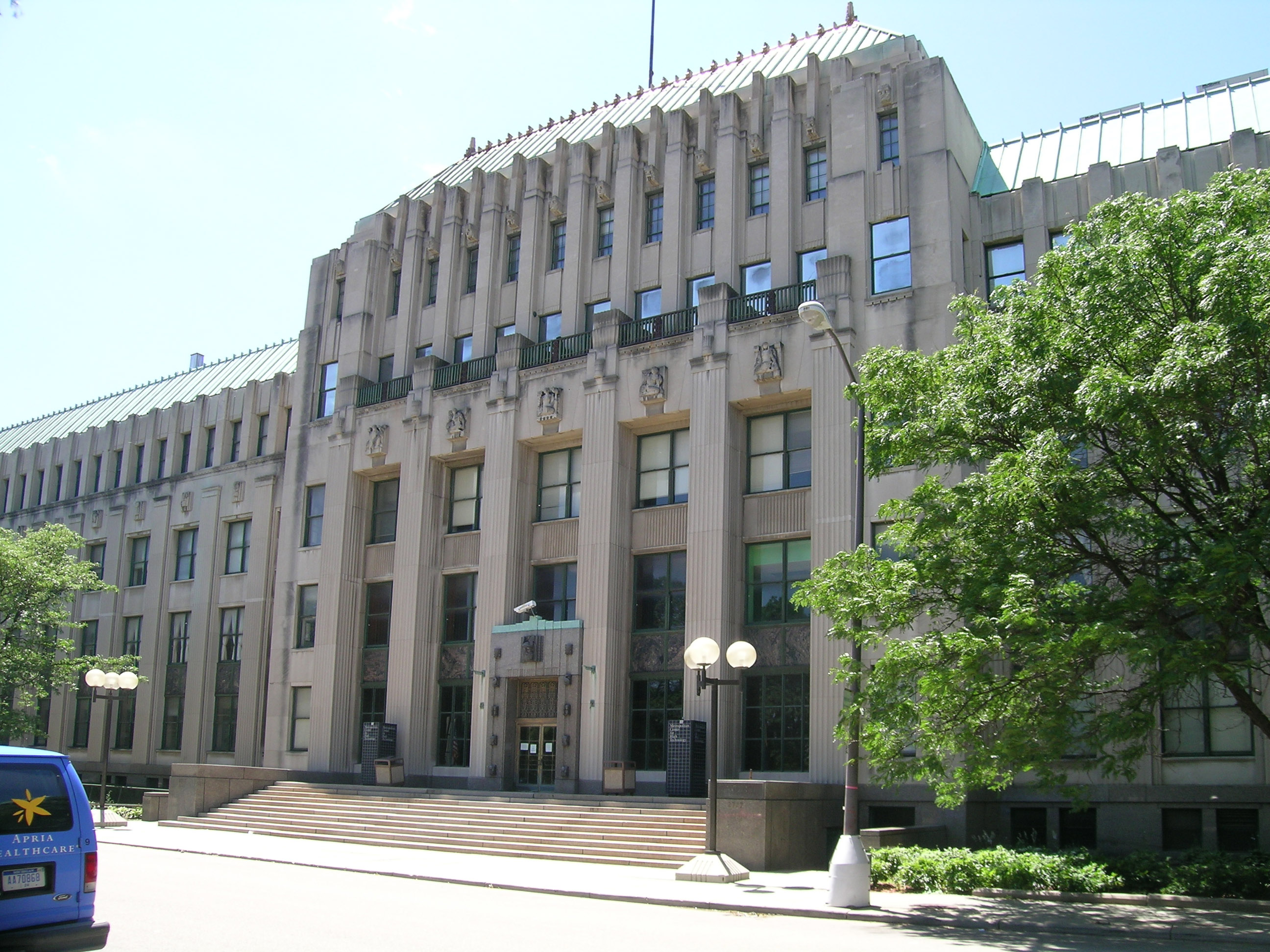
- Interactive map
- Location: 2727 Second Avenue; Detroit, Michigan
- Coordinates: 42°20′24″N 83°3′43″W
- Built: 1927
- Architect: Albert Kahn
- Architectural style: Art Deco
- Part of: Cass Park Historic District (ID04001580)
- NRHP reference No.: 79001175
- MSHS No.: P25153

Significant dates
- Added to NRHP: December 19, 1979
- Designated MSHS: August 3, 1979

The Metropolitan Center for High Technology, formerly S. S. Kresge World Headquarters, is an office building located at 2727 Second Avenue in Midtown Detroit, Michigan. It was listed on the National Register of Historic Places and designated a Michigan State Historic Site in 1979. The office building is now part of Wayne State University and used as a business incubator for startup companies.

== History ==
Sebastian S. Kresge was a prosperous traveling salesman when, in 1884, he purchased a part interest in two retail stores. One of them was located in Detroit; Kresge moved to the city and soon gained control of a five and dime retail store on Woodward. Kresge applied his own name to the store, and by 1899 was beginning to build a chain of five-and-dimes. By 1912, the chain had expanded to 85 Kresge stores.

Kresge incorporated his business, and set about constructing an impressive office building as its headquarters. He commissioned Albert Kahn to design an 18-story building, now known as the Kales Building, at Adams and Park. Kresge's prospered during World War I, and after the war it had begun to outgrow its home.

Kresge again hired Kahn to design a larger headquarters, this time located on Second at Cass Park, spacious enough to provide office facilities for 1,200 Kresge employees. The resulting building, completed in 1927, is unique for its horizontal massing as opposed to the vertical lines of the more common skyscraper, and won awards for its outstanding architecture.

== Description ==
The Kresge World Headquarters is a limestone-faced building, constructed in the shape of a large E with the wings pointing away from the park. It covers a city block, and has 250,000 square feet (23,000 m^{2}) of office space. The central pavilion facing Cass Park is five-and-a-half stories; the wings are only four stories. The building is a mix of styles, with the standing-seam copper Mansard roof decorated with terra cotta cresting reminiscent of Second Empire style, and the clean lines of the facade clearly Art Deco in origin.

The ordered rows of windows emphasize the horizontal, while the classical Doric pilasters at the entrance emphasize the vertical. A bandcourse separates the fourth floor from the lower levels, and the floors above have smaller windows that nevertheless resemble the lower-tier windows.

The interior uses polished granite for the entrance with inlaid walnut paneling.

Kresge used these offices until the firm moved to suburban Troy in 1972. For some years after that, the building was used by the Detroit Institute of Technology. The building is part of Wayne State University, and has been used in part as an incubator for tech start-up firms known as the Metropolitan Center for High Technology. Offices for some Wayne State departments are located in this building.
