= Cass Park Historic District =

Historic district in Michigan, United States

- U.S. National Register of Historic Places
- U.S. Historic district
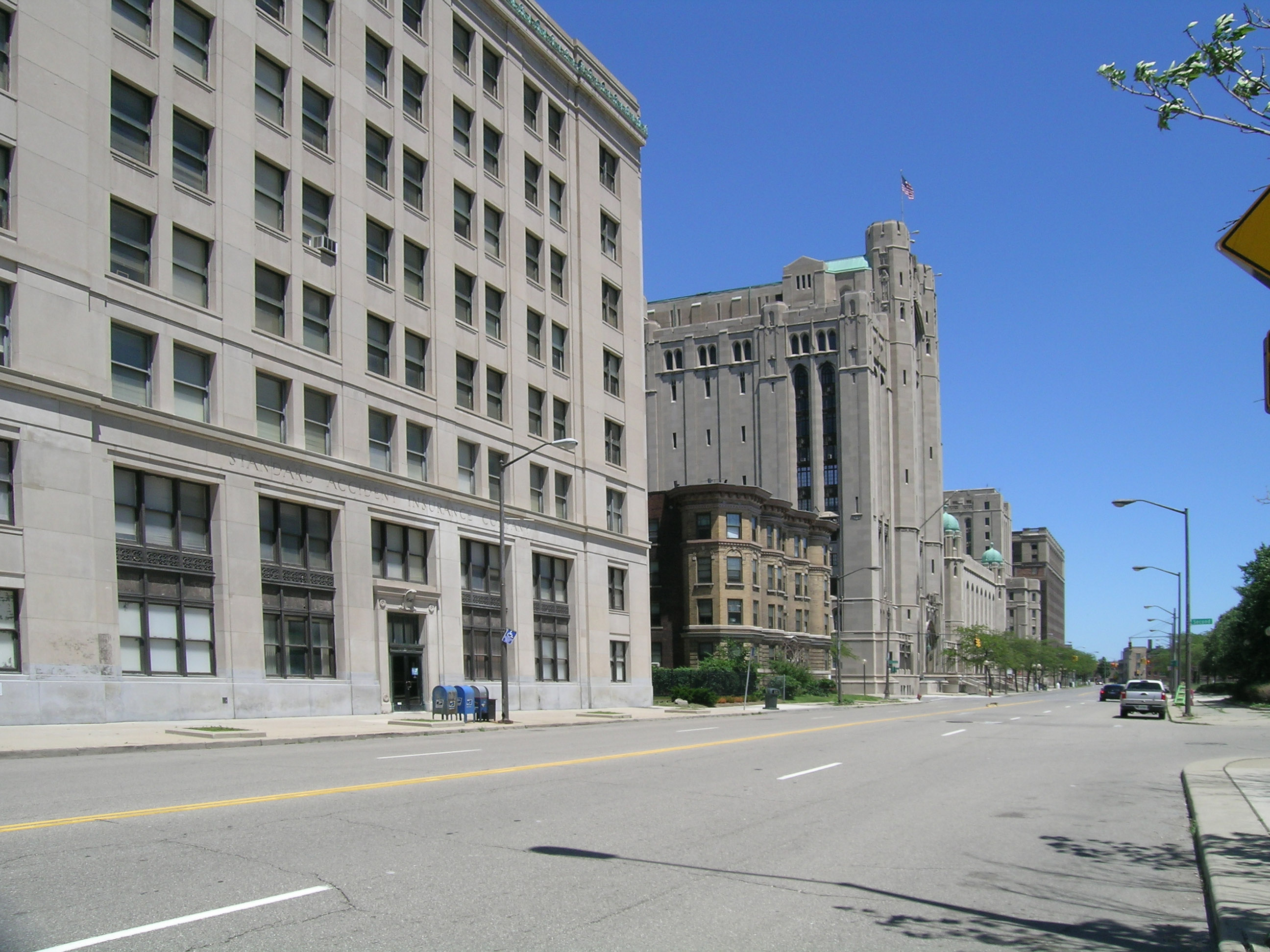
- Temple Street north of Cass Park. The Detroit Masonic Temple is in the midground
- Interactive map
- Location: Temple, Ledyard, and 2nd Sts, Detroit, Michigan, U.S.
- Coordinates: 42°20′25″N 83°3′35″W
- Architect: Ellington & Weston; et al.
- Architectural style: Classical Revival, Art Deco
- NRHP reference No.: 04001580
- Added to NRHP: February 2, 2005

The Cass Park Historic District is a historic district in Midtown Detroit, Michigan, consisting of 25 buildings along the streets of Temple, Ledyard, and 2nd, surrounding Cass Park. It was listed on the National Register of Historic Places in 2005 and designated a city of Detroit historic district in 2016.

== History ==
The area surrounding Cass Park was originally laid out as part of a French ribbon farm extending from the Detroit River. Lewis Cass, the park's namesake, purchased the farm in 1816 when he moved to the area. He constructed a house on Larned Street between First and Second Avenues, and in 1840 a larger house on the northwest corner of Fort and Cass Streets. Starting in 1836, Cass began subdividing his land, platting lots between Larned and the river. Over the next 30 years, Cass platted more northerly sections of his claim. The area that now encompasses the Cass Park Historic District began to be sold as lots after 1859. In 1860, Cass deeded a section of land to the city of Detroit, bounded by Second, Ledyard, Cass and Bagg (now Temple), to be used as a public park.

In 1863, the Detroit City Railway Company began streetcar service Along Woodward Avenue, only a few blocks away from Cass Park. The streetcar service spurred development northward along Woodward, including the Cass Park area. The area soon became a fashionable suburb of the city. In 1875, the city landscaped Cass Park, planting a number of new trees. By the 1880s, some of Detroit's most prominent citizens lived along the park, including James Vernor, E. W. Voigt, and John H. Avery. Avery's house at 457 Ledyard is the only residence remaining from this period within the district.

The Cass Park area continued to be a fashionable address into the 1900s. However, the 1890s saw the introduction of upscale apartment buildings. In 1895, the Alhambra Flats at 100–112 Temple and The Marlborouh Flats 2537 Second (demolished in 1940s) was constructed, followed in 1905 by the Cromwell Flats at 2942 Second, and in 1908 by the Ansonia Flats at 2909 Second. As Detroit continued developing, apartment buildings with smaller but more numerous units began to appear, including the Manhattan Apartments at 2966 Second in 1905, and the Altadena Apartments at 2952 Second in 1911. This marked a transformation of the Cass Park area, as the single family homes surrounding the park were replaced with apartment buildings to house the city's expanding population. By 1925, a number of new apartment buildings had been constructed.

In addition, by the early 1920s, the business development of the city center reached into the Cass Park area, with businesses constructing their headquarters near the park. The first one of these was the Standard Accident Insurance Company, who built their headquarters at 640 Temple in 1921. Also by 1920, the city's Freemasonry had purchased a plot of land on what is now Temple Avenue to construct a new building, replacing the lodge on Lafayette which the organizations had outgrown. Construction on the Detroit Masonic Temple, the largest building in the district, began in 1920 and was completed in 1926. The Knights of Pythias followed suit, building a headquarters adjacent to the Masonic Temple in 1926. In 1927, the S. S. Kresge Corporation built its World Headquarters along the park.

Smaller businesses located along the more heavily traveled Cass Avenue near the Park. A number of structures were constructed in this area, including a commercial building housing the Lasky Corporation at 146–166 Temple in 1923, the Will Mar Garage at 131 Temple in 1924, and a film exchange building at 479 Ledyard in 1936. During World War II the city's exploding population caused apartment owners in the area to subdivide their units to house the influx of workers.

After the war, the Cass Park area declined economically, with the apartment buildings being further divided into substandard units. Many buildings fell into disrepair or were abandoned. During the 1950s-1970s the Cass Park area became one of the most economically depressed neighborhoods of the city, and a number of charitable organizations moved into the area. In 1955, the Episcopal Diocese of Detroit constructed the Mariners Inn at 445 Ledyard as a shelter and treatment center for alcoholic sailors. The construction of Interstate 75 in Michigan, cutting off the park from downtown, hastened the decline of the neighborhood. Businesses moved into the suburbs, and the buildings left behind were taken over by nonprofit organizations, abandoned, or razed.

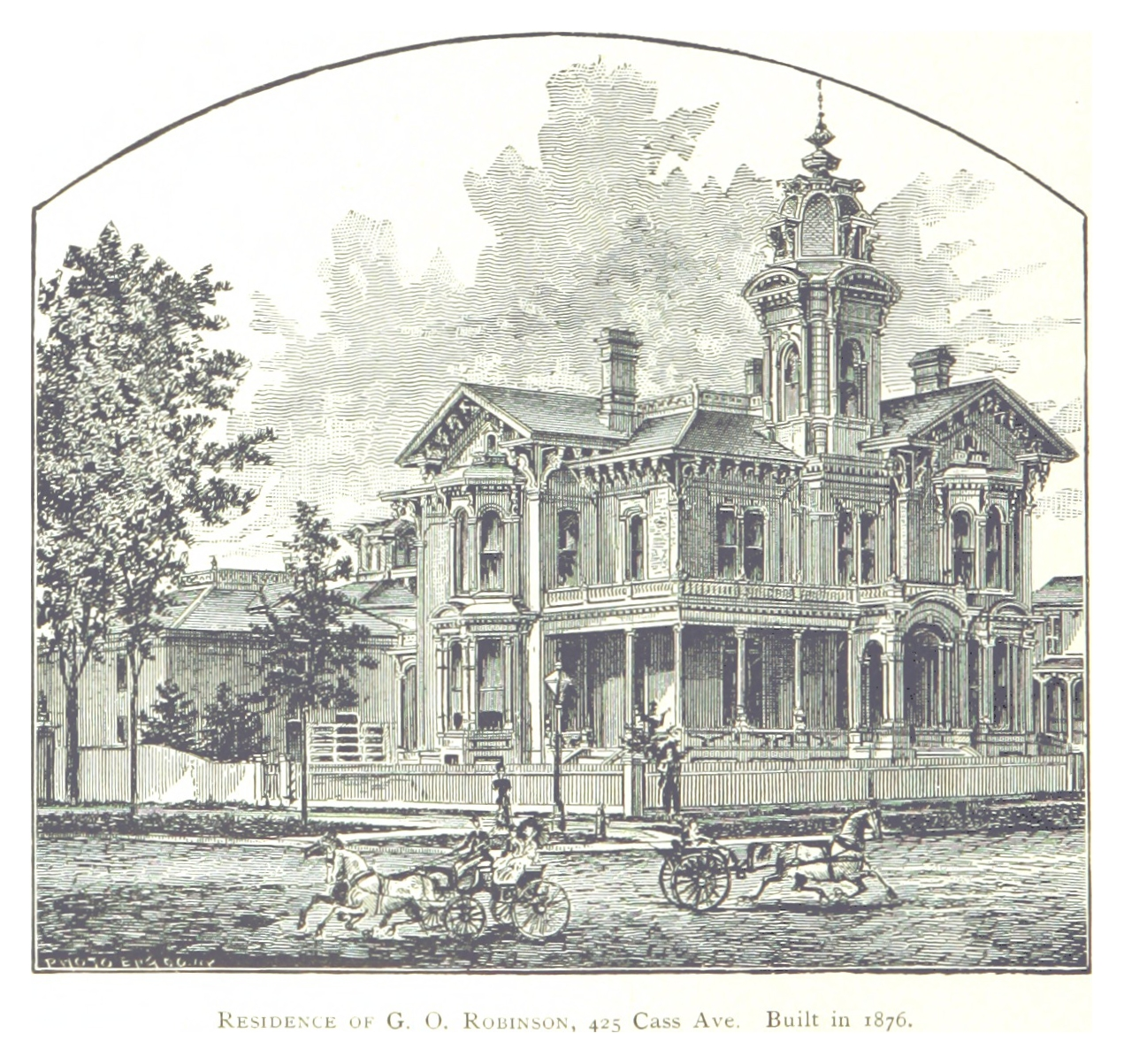
Residence of George Orville Robinson in the north corner of Cass and Ledyard, was built in 1876 and designed by Henry T Brush, was demolished in 1940s.

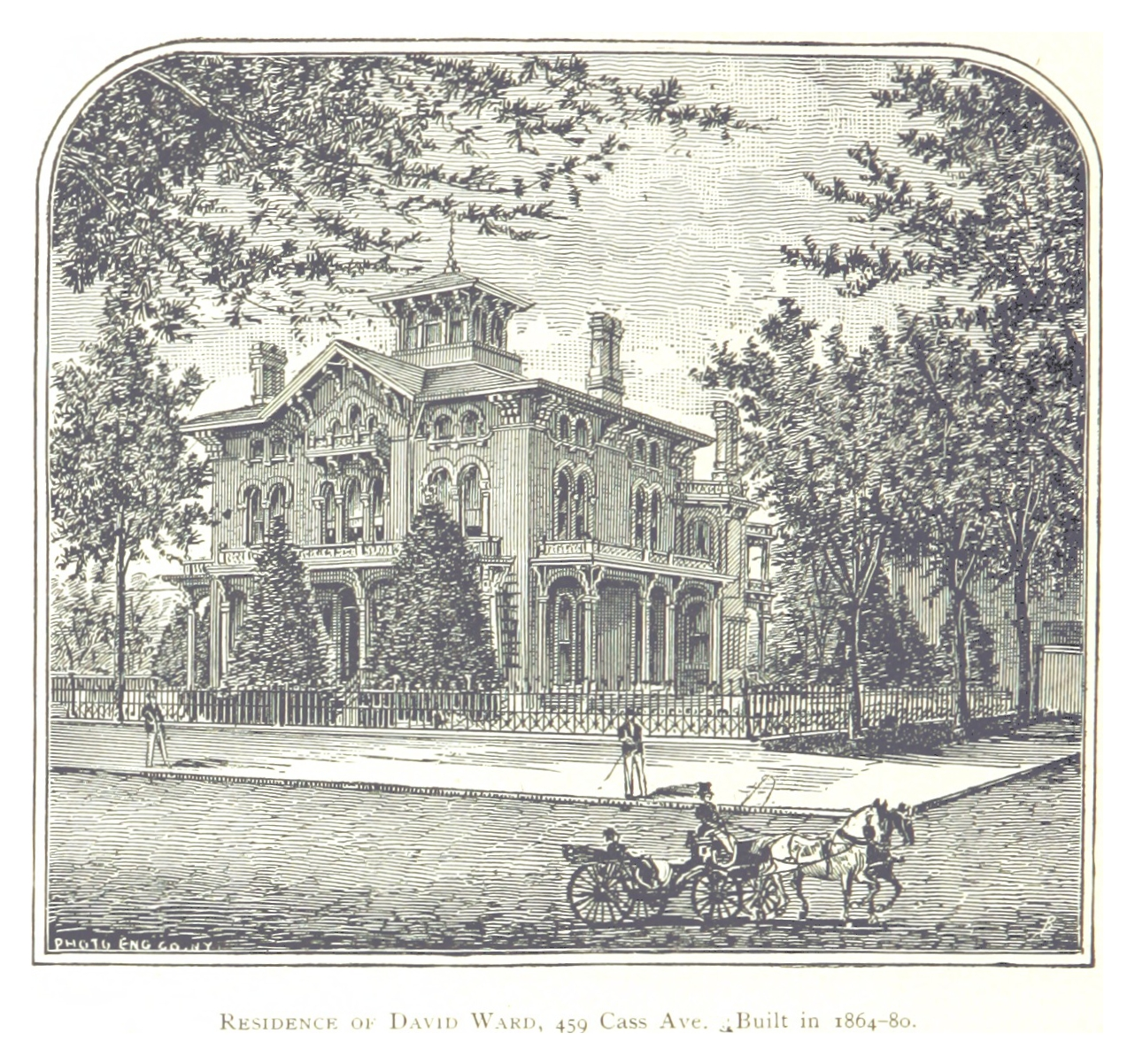
Residence of David Ward in the southwest corner of Cass and Temple, was built in 1864 and demolished in 1940s.

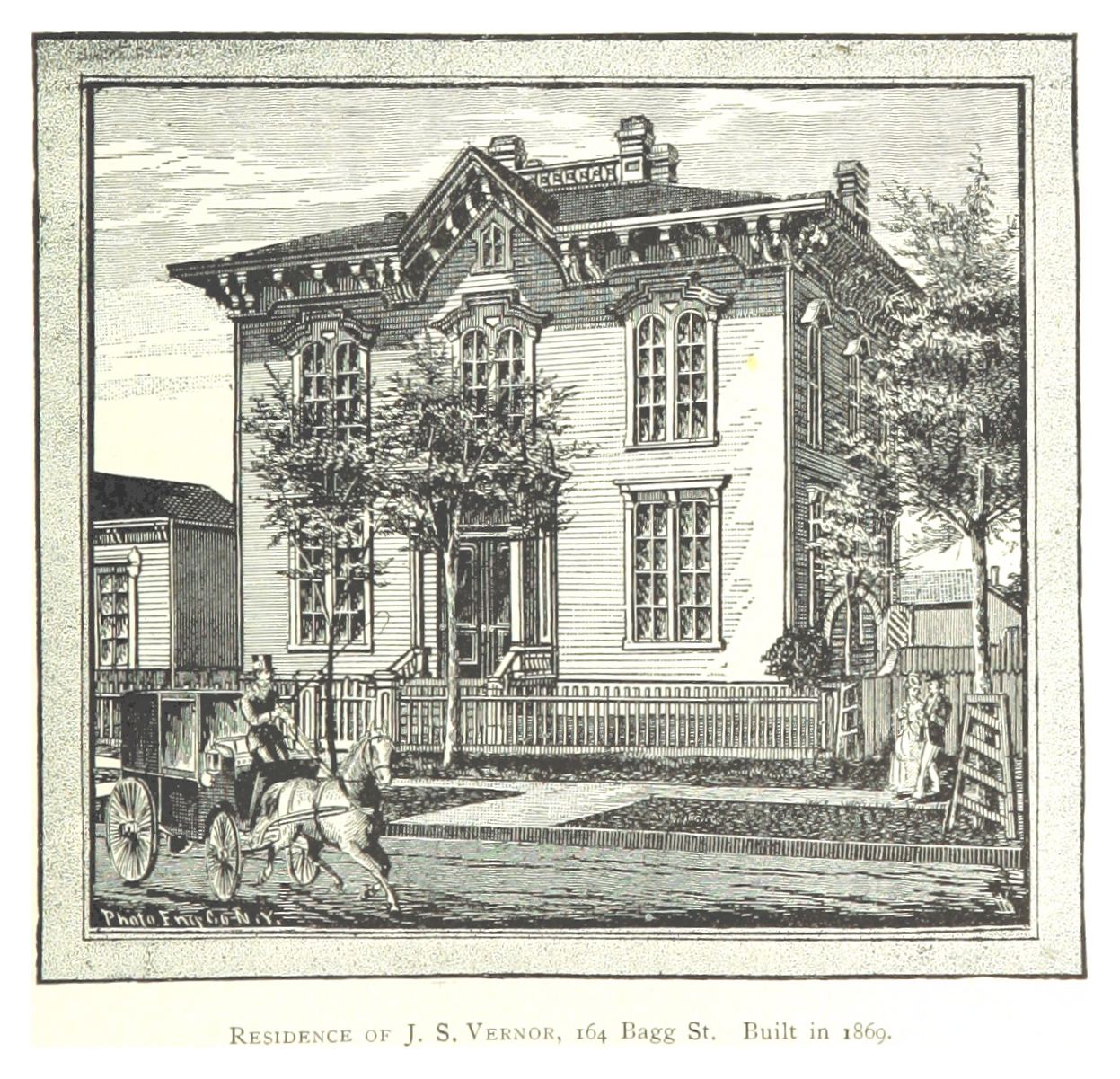
Residence of James S Vernor, 648 Temple, built in 1869 and demolished in 1920.

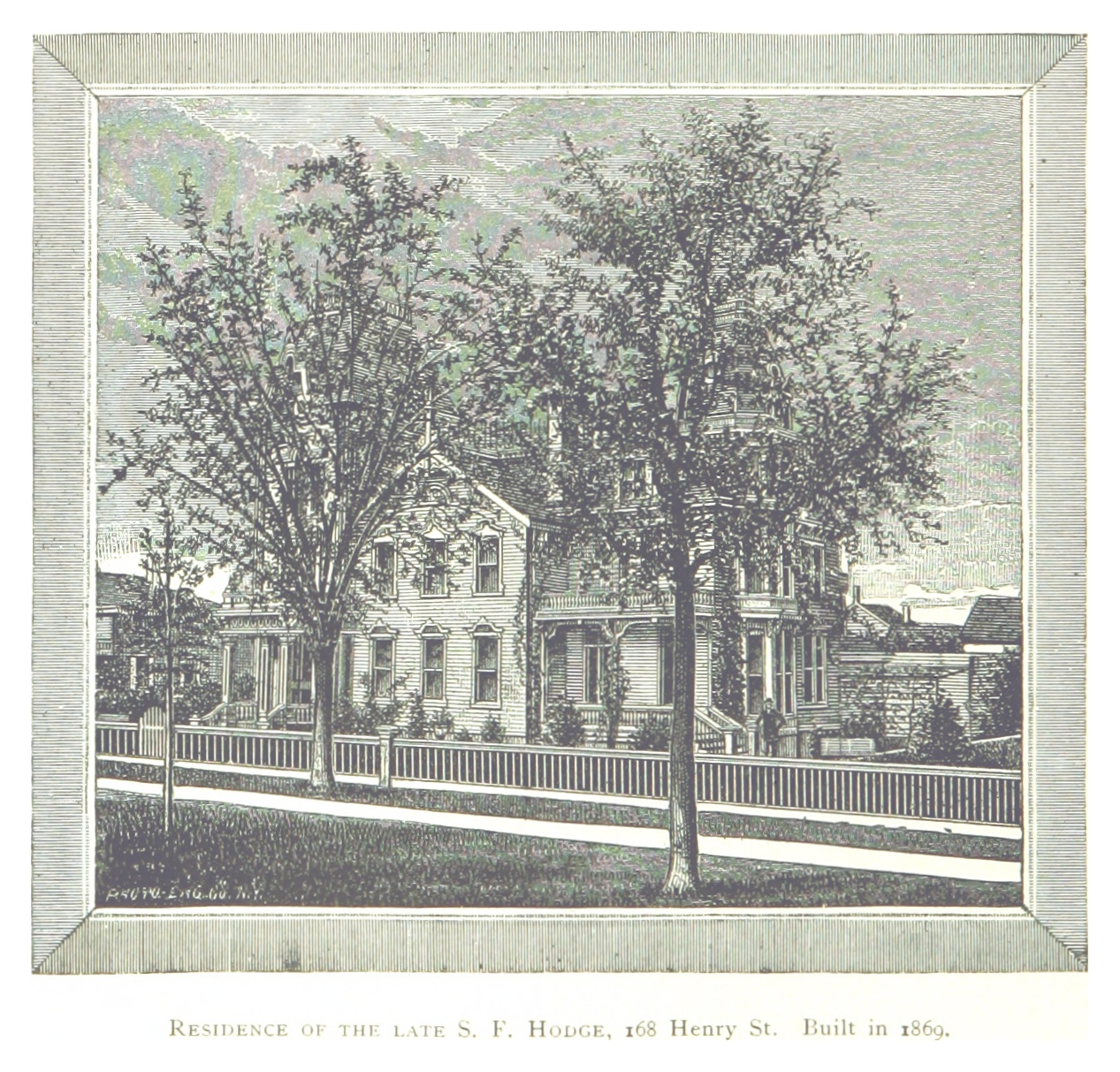
Residence of S.F Hodges in 628 Henry, was built in 1869 and demolished in 1928/29.

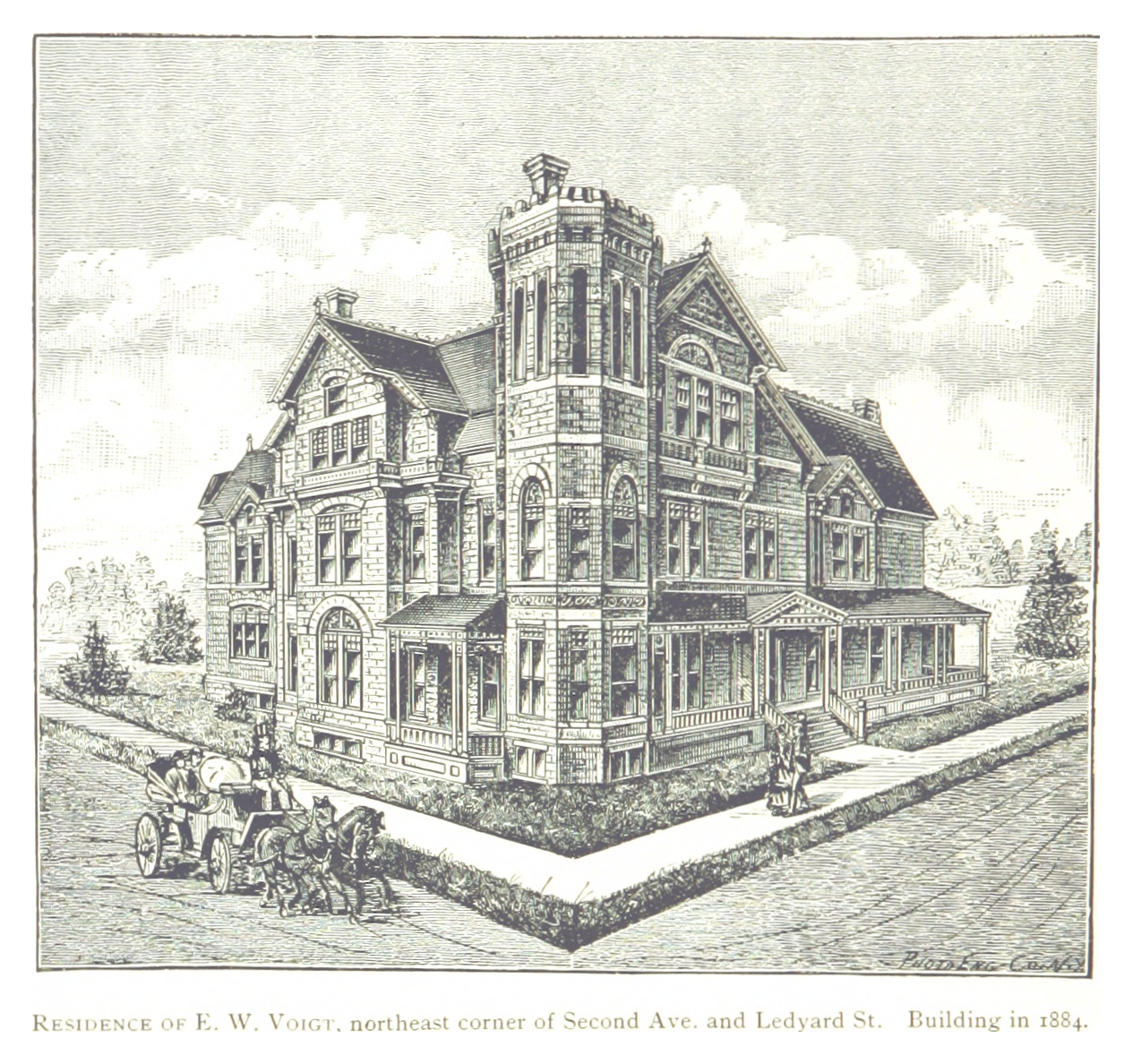
Residence of Edward W Voigt, in the southeast corner of Second and Ledyard, was built in 1884 and designed by Julius Hess, was demolished in 1955.

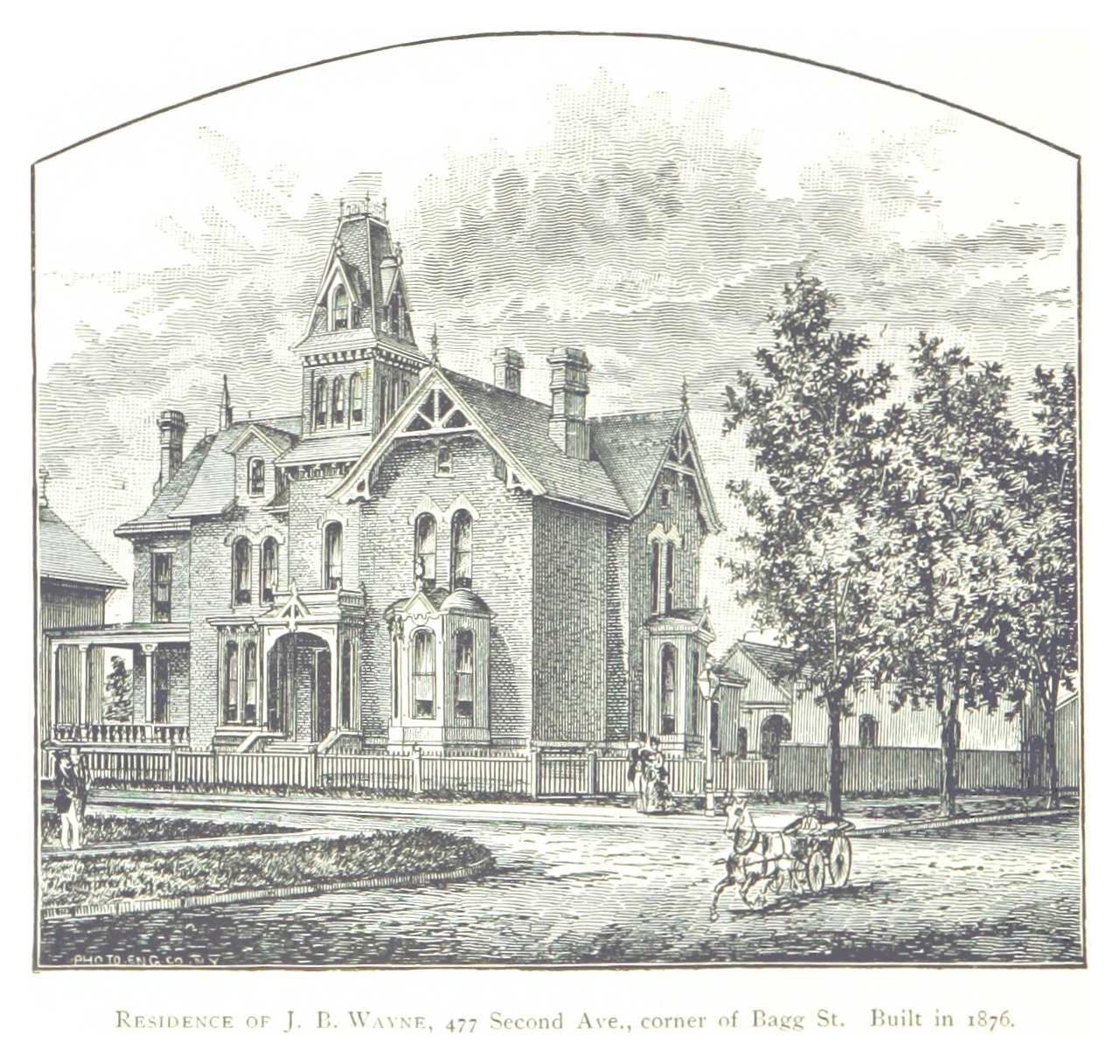
Residence of John B Wayne, in 2781 Second, was built in 1876 and demolished in 1929 for the Kresge Building.

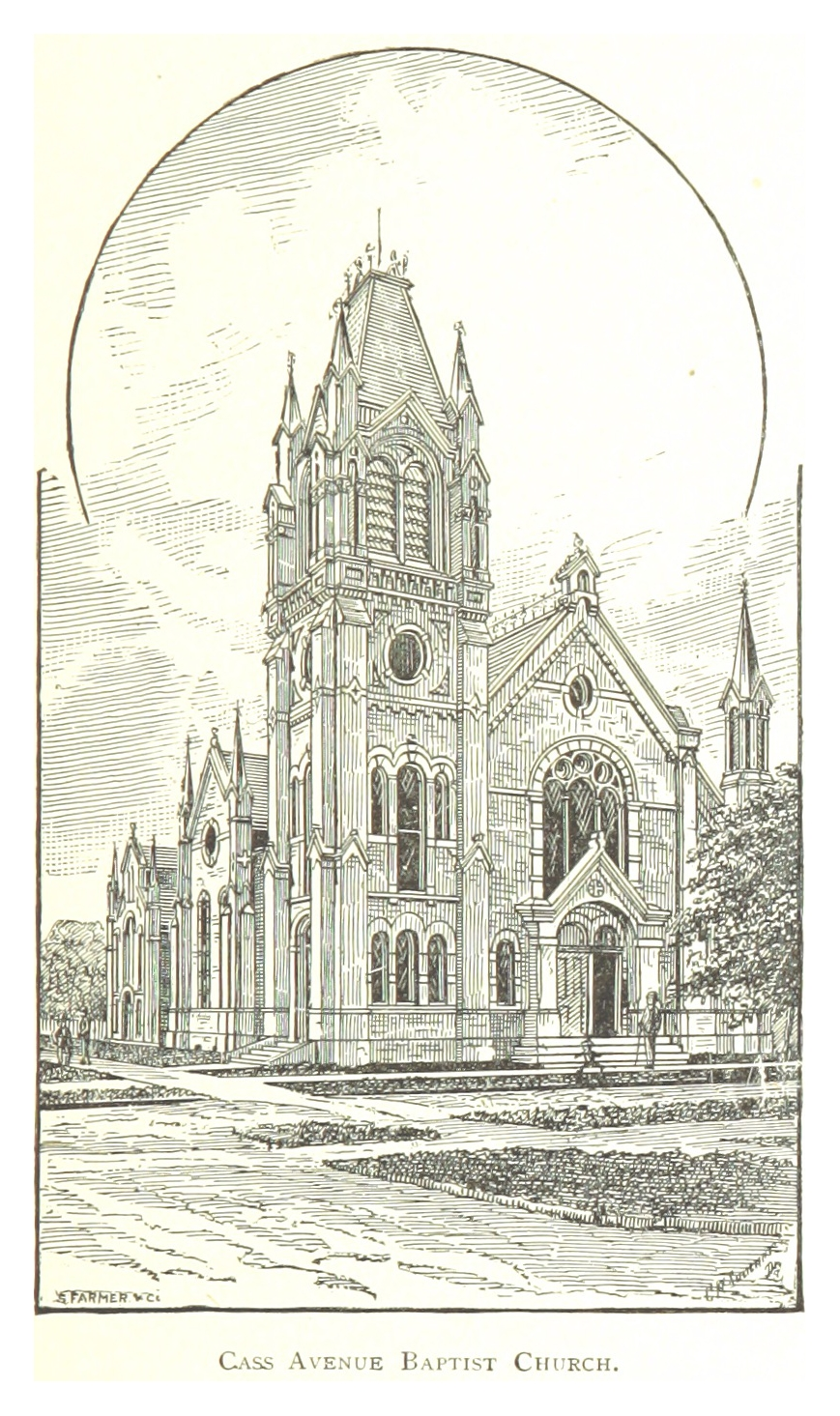
Cass Avenue Baptist Church, built in 1873 and designed by Mortimer L Smith, was demolished in 1925 for the Fort Wayne Hotel.

== Description ==
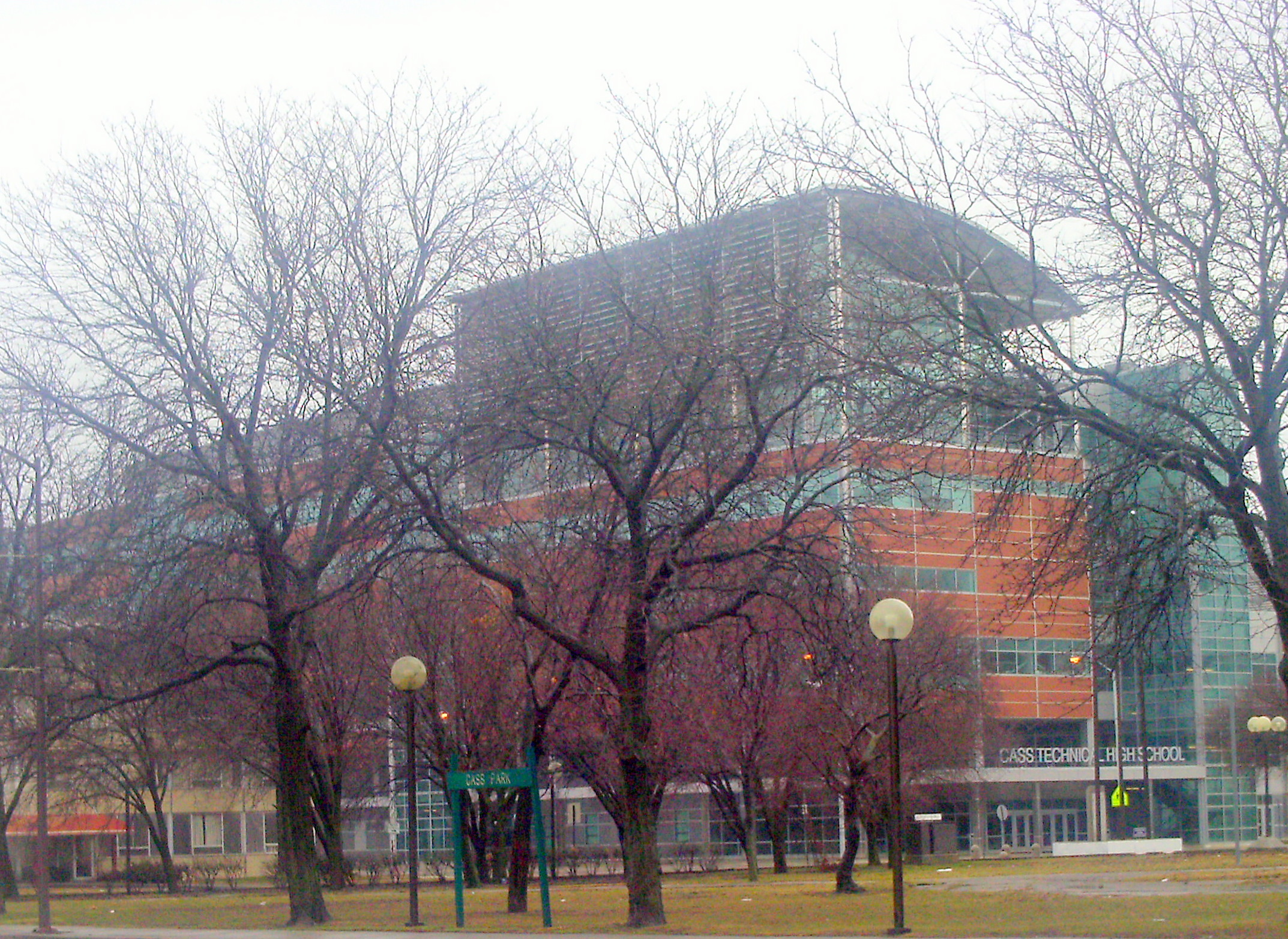
Cass Tech from across Cass Park

The Cass Park Historic District includes Cass Park, a formal square with angled paths and scattered statues, as well as various commercial headquarters buildings, apartment buildings, the monumental Detroit Masonic Temple and other structures surrounding the park. Cass Park is a landscaped green space, containing abundant trees, park benches and modern, multi-color playground equipment. A fountain was once in the center of the park. A statue of Robert Burns, sculpted by George Anderson Lawson in 1921, is located at the north side of the park, facing the Masonic Temple. The new Cass Technical High School is located just to the south of the park, and various other buildings, all of which are contained within this historic district, surround and frame the park space.

The national designation includes 25 buildings, two of which are demolished (the Adams Apartments and Williams Apartments) and two of which are classified as non-contributing to the district (Park Plaza and the Cass Park Baptist Center). The city of Detroit designation includes 19 of the 25 buildings included in the national designation, excepting the four demolished and non-contributing structures, as well as the Mariners Inn and the Will Mar Garage. Two of the buildings in the district (the S.S. Kresge Company Headquarters and the Detroit Masonic Temple) are individually listed on the National Register of Historic Places.

The buildings in the district include:

=== South of Cass Park ===
- Mariners Inn, 445 Ledyard: This two-story, rectangular brick office building was designed by architect Charles Vogel for the Episcopal Church to house sailors who had substance abuse problems. It was constructed in 1955 and is still in use. The Mariner's Inn is not included in the city historic district designation.
- John H. Avery House, 457 Ledyard: This 3 1/2-story, three-bay-wide, red-brick Italianate house with a flat roof was constructed in 1878, with the upper floor likely added in about 1905. It was constructed for prominent businessman John H. Avery, son of lumber baron Newell Avery. It is one of the few remaining single family homes in the area and the only one in the district. The front facade has elaborate carved stone hoods over the first and second floor windows, with a denticulated stringcourse separating the lower floors from the later third floor addition.
- Michigan Chronicle, 479 Ledyard: This two-story, three-bay, brick office building was constructed in 1936 by builder H.G. Winter as a film exchange building. In the 1960s the building became the home of the Michigan Chronicle, the first paper in Detroit owned and operated by African Americans. The building has an Art Moderne limestone facade with large metal-framed windows separated by ridged vertical piers.
- Park Plaza, 2560 Second: This four-story building was constructed in 1956, A.J. Etkin as the Park Plaza Motor Hotel, containing 10 ten apartments and 58 single rooms. In 1971, the building was converted to the Park Plaza Home for the Aged and an addition was constructed. The facade is white brick, with red brick in end walls. The Park Plaza is a non-contributing structure, and is not included in the city historic district designation.

=== West of Cass Park ===
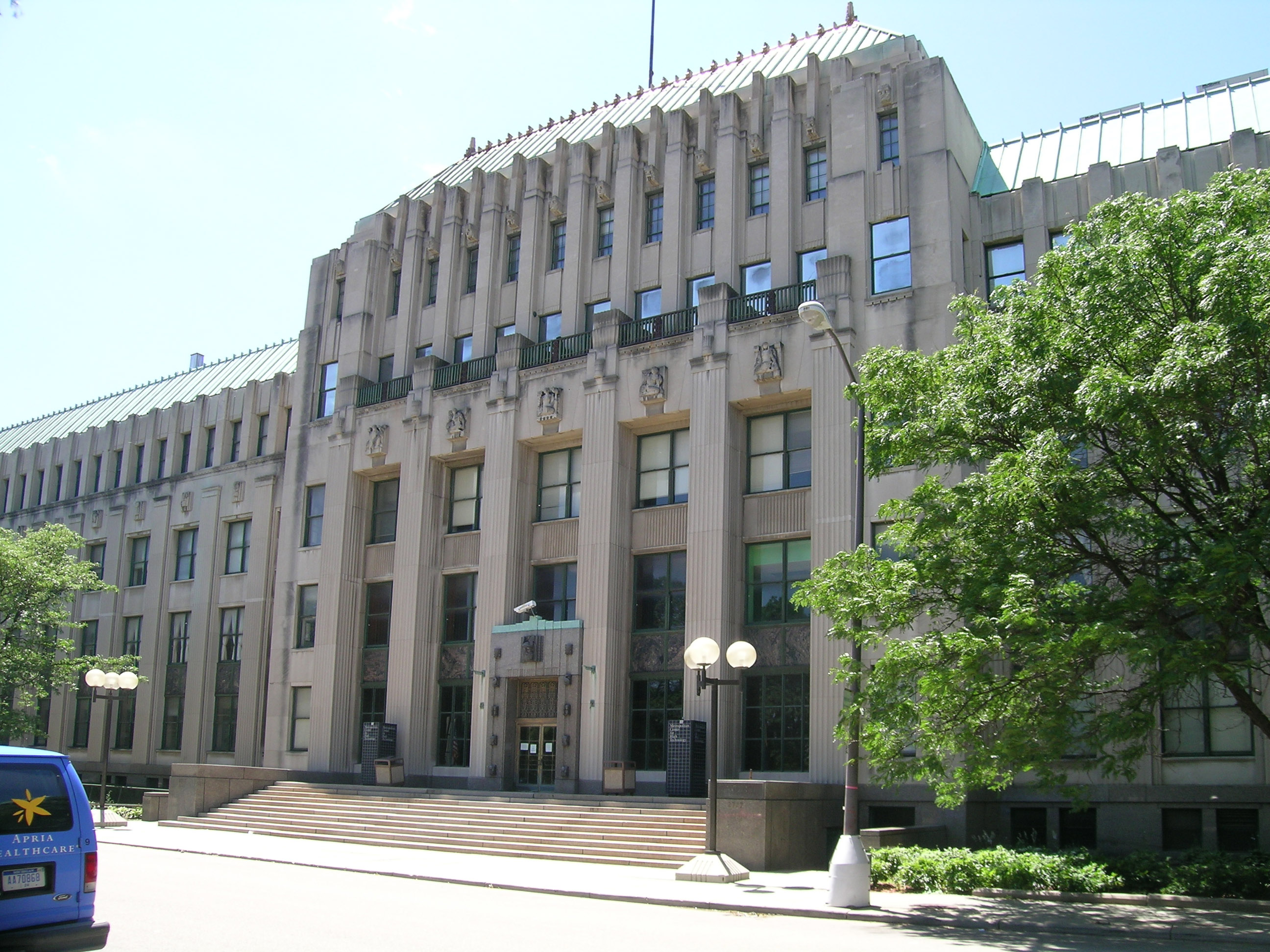
S. S. Kresge World Headquarters

- S.S. Kresge Company / Metropolitan Center for High Technology, 2727 Second: This is a 5 1/2-story, brick and limestone Art Deco office building designed by Albert Kahn and built in 1928–30. Kresge used these offices until the firm moved to suburban Troy in 1972. For some years after that, the building was used by the Detroit Institute of Technology. The broad facade fronts on the entire western side of Cass Park. The symmetric building has a projecting 5 1/2-story central section flanked by four-story wings with projecting ends.

=== East of Cass Park ===
- Cass Park Baptist Center, 2700 Second: This is a two-story yellow brick building with a recessed corner entrance constructed in 1966. The Cass Park Baptist Center is a non-contributing structure, and is not included in the city historic district designation. It was demolished in 2017
- Cass Park Apartments, 2714 Second: This 4 1/2-story brown brick apartment building, three bays wide, was constructed in 1914, and originally contained 37 units. The vernacular Georgian Revival / Arts and Crafts facade has a central portico running the height of the building, tiered with balconies.
- Adams Apartments/Martin Apartments, 2764 Second: This was a 4 1/2-story, three-bay, brown brick apartment building constructed in 1916 and holding 36 units. The center bay, recessed between flanking bays, held an arched entryway. The Adams Apartments has been demolished, and is not included in the city historic district designation. It was demolished in 2005.

=== North of Cass Park ===
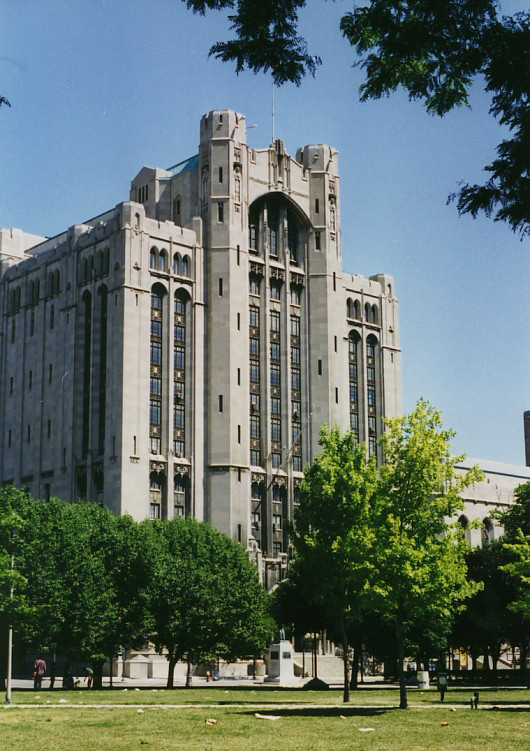
Detroit Masonic Temple

- Fort Wayne Hotel / American Hotel, 400–426 Temple : This 11-story, brown-brick and terra cotta building was designed by Ellington and Weston and constructed in 1926 as a lodge headquarters and hotel for the Knights of Pythias. The first and second floors are finished in smooth ashlar and a decorative string of red and blue terra cotta tiles separate the ninth and tenth stories. The upper two stories have decorative stone surrounds.
- William Apartments / Temple Towers, 439 Temple: This 6 1/2-story, U-shaped, brown brick and masonry apartment building was designed by Joseph P. Jogerst, and constructed in 1915. It originally held 60 units. The basement level was concrete block, the first floor was faced with smooth ashlar, and the upper floors had two three-sided window. bays. The William Apartments has been demolished, and is not included in the city historic district designation. It was demolished in 2006.
- Detroit Masonic Temple, 500 Temple: This English Gothic building was designed by George D. Mason, and construction began in 1922. It is the largest Masonic Temple in the world, extremely ornate and structurally complex. The Temple consists of three separate buildings, unified by their exterior details: the fourteen-story Ritualistic Building, the ten-story Shrine Club, and the seven-story Auditorium Building connecting the other two. All three buildings are sheathed in Indiana limestone sculptural details by Corrado Parducci.
- Standard Accident Insurance Building / Wayne County Department of Social Services, 640 Temple: This eight-story, seven-bay, Classical Revival brick and stone office building was designed by Albert Kahn and constructed in 1920. The first and second floors have sets of three double hung windows separated by stone pilasters. The upper floors have sets of two 1/1 double hung windows.
- Ansonia Flats / Ansonia Apartments, 2901–23 Second: This 4 1/2-story yellow brick apartment building was constructed in 1908, and originally held 20 luxury units. It is divided into three separate sections with three separate entrances. Two entrances are on Second and the third is on Temple. The Georgian Revival facade contains multiple bays, giving it an undulating form. The Temple facade has three bow front bays with a semi-octagonal corner bay. The Second facade has three round bays and one square bay.
- Boulevard Hotel, 2931–33 Second: This 3 1/2-story, brown brick apartment building, was constructed in 1924, and originally had 36 units. The Craftsman-style structure is five bays wide, with a central entrance bay flanked by two projecting bays topped by Flemish gables.
- Cromwell Flats / Cromwell Apartments, 2942 Second: This 3 1/2-story brown brick apartment building was designed by Almon C. Varney and constructed in 1904. The building is three bays wide, with a central entrance bay flanked by three-sided window bays containing alternating bands of brick and stone. The Cromwell is one of three buildings, along with the Altadena Apartments and Manhattan Apartments, that located together and constructed with closely matching setback and design.
- Altadena Apartments, 2952–58 Second: This 4 1/2-story, brown brick apartment building was designed by Pollmar & Ropes and constructed in 1911. It originally contained 12 units. It has two entrances, and two three-sided window bays running from the second to the fourth floor on each end of the building.
- Manhattan Apartments, 2966–72 Second: This 4 1/2-story, brown brick apartment building was designed by Pollmar & Ropes and constructed in 1905. It has a center entrance bay flanked by two three-sided window bays running from the second to the fourth floor. Design details include metal spandrels painted green within the window bays, a cornice with quatrefoil inset details, and a battlemented parapet.
- Wilburne Apartments, 487 Charlotte: This 3 1/2-story, three-bay, yellow brick apartment building contains 32 units, and is now known as the Vernon Murphy Apartments. It was constructed in 1916 in a Renaissance Revival and Arts and Crafts style, with a recessed, arched entrance, and a wide hipped roof supported by brackets and rafter tails.

=== On / East of Cass Avenue ===
- Temple Bar, 2906–14 Cass Avenue: A single-story brick commercial building constructed in 1925. The storefront was updated in 1941 with a streamlined Art Moderne look. The front facade has two entrance doorways set back between curved glass block windows.
- 2930 Cass Avenue: A three-story brown brick commercial building with four bays, constructed in 1915 by Albert G. Riesterer to house his drug store. Ten apartments were located on the upper floors. The first floor has a storefront and entrance to the upstairs apartments; there are identical fanlights in the transom above the storefront and above the apartment entrance. Panels of green tile line the parapet at the top of the building.
- 2949 Cass Avenue: This two-story, three-bay, reinforced concrete commercial building faced with red brick was designed by Albert Kahn and built in 1922 as a film exchange building. The three bays are divided by projecting piers.
- Alhambra Flats / The Embassy, 100–112 Temple: This six-story, brick and stone, Romanesque Revival apartment building, was designed by William S Joy and constructed in 1895. The first and second floors of the main facades are faced with rock-faced stone, while the upped floors are faced with pink brick. Entryways are covered with heavy rounded arches. The second through sixth floors have rounded bays on the corners and a three-sided bay in the center of the south facade, along with a bay consisting of recessed open porches in each facade.
- Will Mar Garage, 131 Temple: This two-story brick and reinforced concrete garage was constructed in 1924. It has a central entrance flanked by large window openings, and a truck bay at the building end. Will Mar Garage is not included in the city historic district designation. It was demolished in 2017.
- The Alden, 145 Temple: This 3 1/2-story brick Renaissance Revival apartment building was constructed in 1922 by George P. Rogers. The original building contained 22 units, but an addition constructed six months later held an additional 20 units. The limestone front facade contains a Classic door surround with stylized columns. The first floor has arched window openings with French doors.
- 146–166 Temple: This three-story, reinforced concrete Classical Revival commercial building was constructed in 1923. The first floor contains storefronts, while the window groups in the floors above are separated by pilasters that span both stories.

== See also ==
- Cass Corridor
- Cass-Davenport Historic District
