= Architecture of metropolitan Detroit =

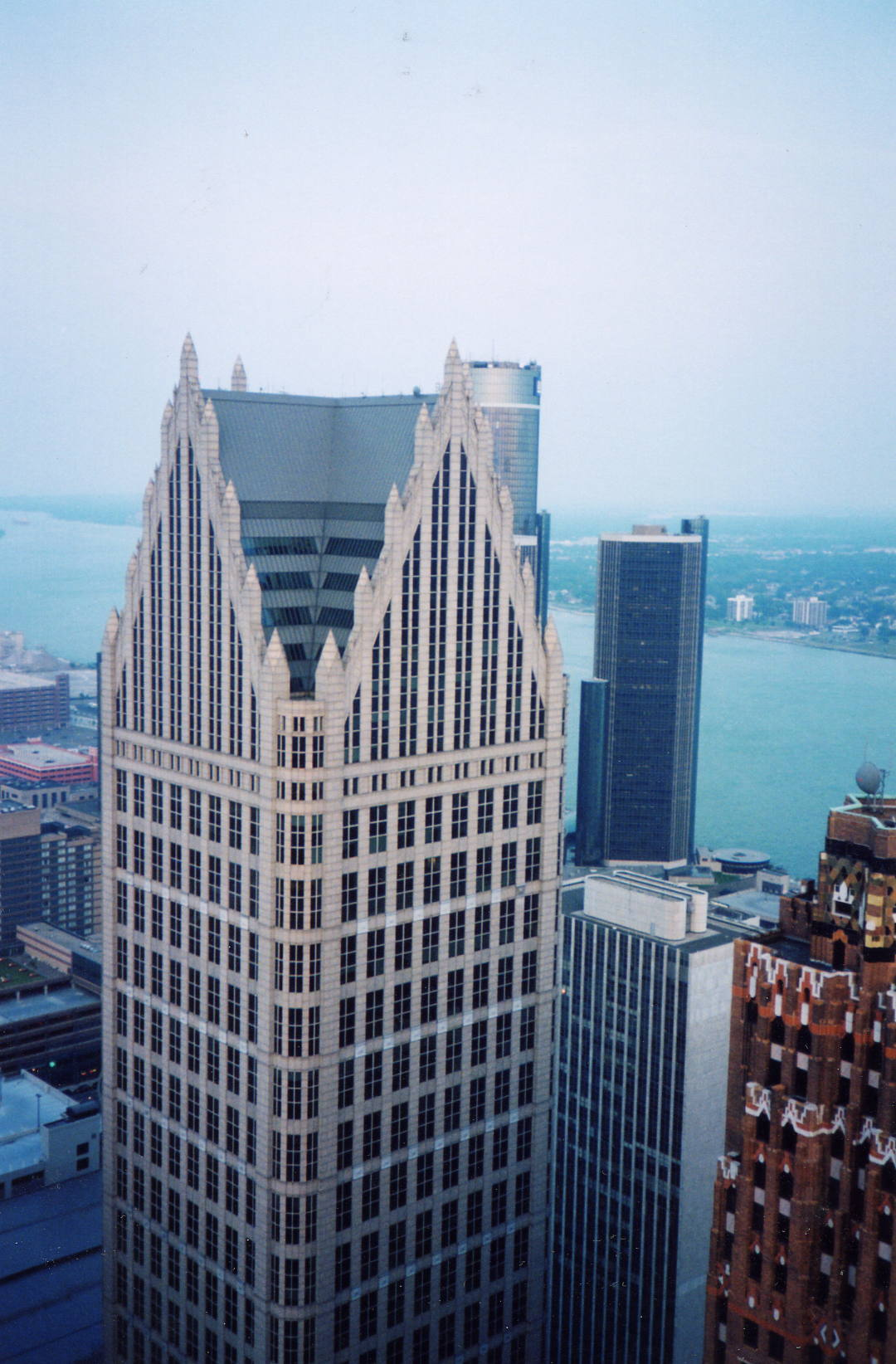
One Detroit Center by John Burgee and Philip C. Johnson.

The architecture of metropolitan Detroit continues to attract the attention of architects and preservationists alike. With one of the world's recognizable skylines, Detroit's waterfront panorama shows a variety of architectural styles. The post-modern neogothic spires of One Detroit Center refer to designs of the city's historic Art Deco skyscrapers. Together with the Renaissance Center, they form the city's distinctive skyline.

Detroit's architecture is recognized as being among the finest in the U.S. Detroit has one of the largest surviving collections of late-19th- and early-20th-century buildings in the U.S. Because of the city's economic difficulties, the National Trust for Historic Preservation has listed many of Detroit's skyscrapers and buildings as some of America's most endangered landmarks.

The suburbs contain some significant contemporary architecture and several historic estates.

== Skyscrapers ==
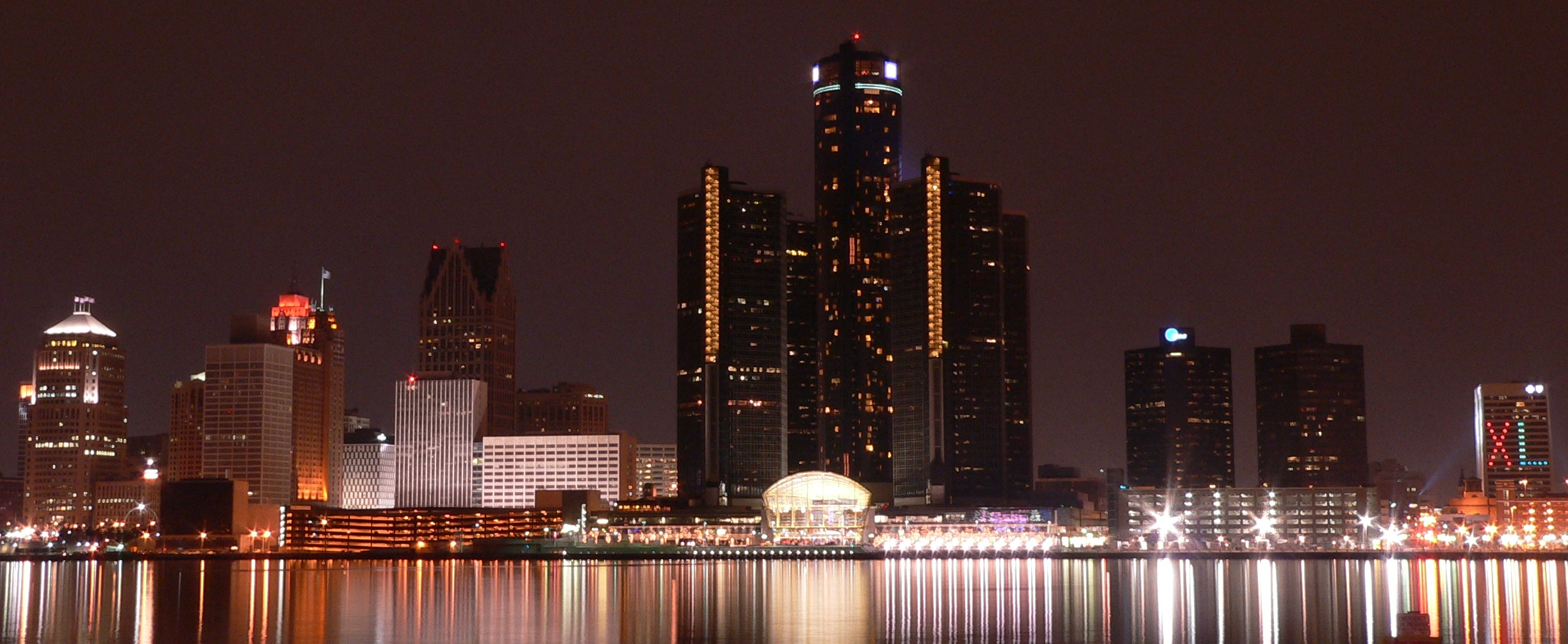
Skyline along the Detroit International Riverfront

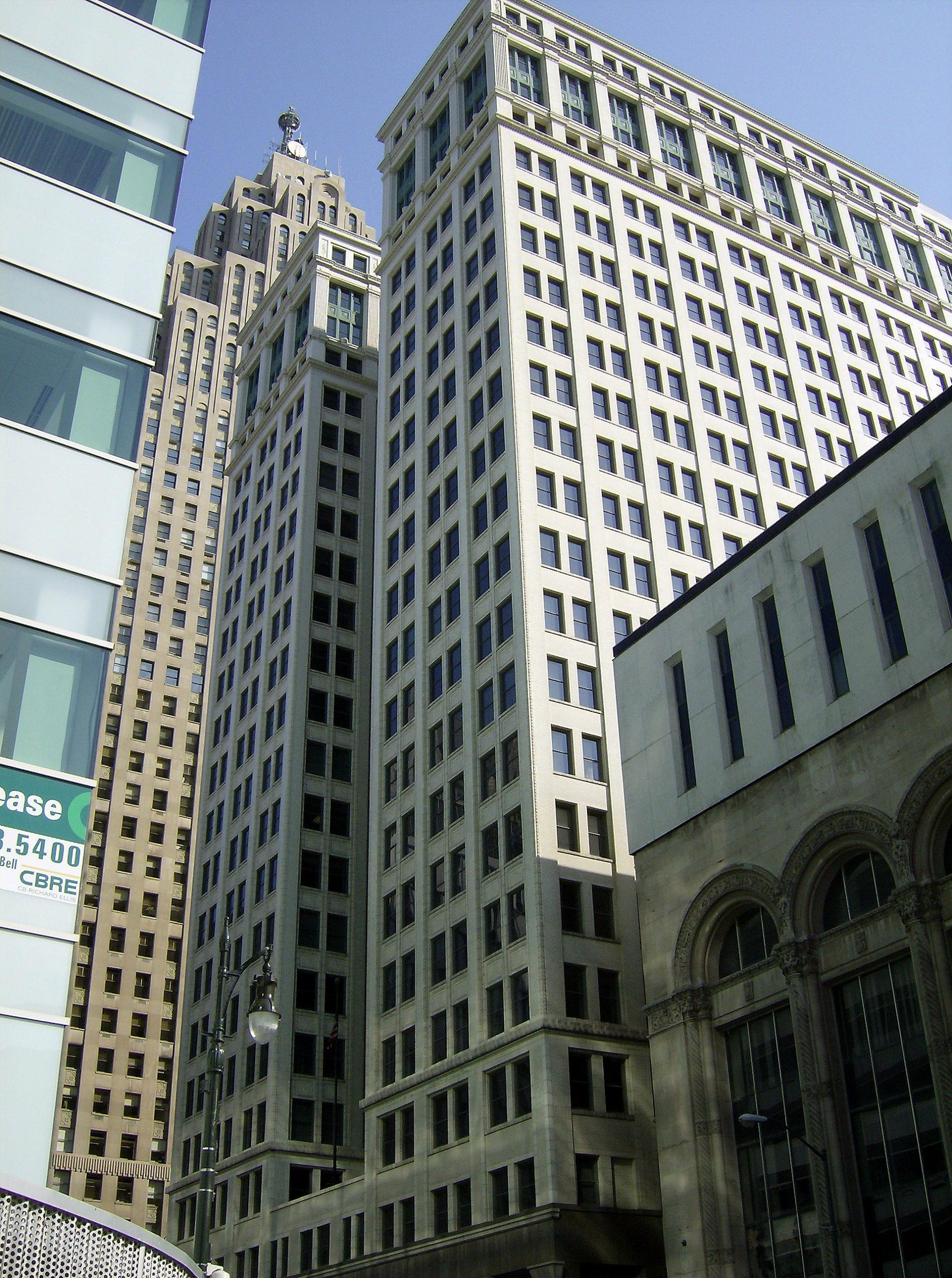
Neoclassical Chrysler House (1912) by Daniel Burnham in the Detroit Financial District

In the 1880s, Gilded Age architects such as Wilson Eyre Gordon Lloyd, Harry J. Rill, Henry T Brush, Julius Hess, John V Smith, Elijah E Myers, Alamon C Varney, Mortimer L Smith, Peter Dederich, Joseph e MiIls and the firms Donaldson & Meier, Malcomson & Higginbotham and Mason & Rice who had designed churches and residences in the most exclusive neighborhoods (Woodward Avenue, Brush Park, Jefferson Avenue and W Fort Street), turned their attention to office and commercial buildings. They designed some of Detroit's ornately stone-carved 19th-century tall buildings, many of which are still standing. Eyre was commissioned to design The Detroit Club at 712 Cass Ave (1891) Lloyd's Romanesque six-story iron-framed Wright-Kay (1891) at 1500 Woodward Ave and his R. H. Traver Building (1889) at 1211 Woodward are prime examples. The Wright-Kay, or Schwankovsky Building, was among the first to have an electric elevator. Rill designed the ornate Beaux-Arts facade of Detroit Cornice and Slate (1897) at 733 Antoine. The six-story Romanesque Globe Tobacco Building (1888) at 407 E. Fort, built by Alexander Chapoton, is another of the city's early surviving commercial buildings. Detroit's Victorian-styled Randolph Street Historic District contains some of the city's oldest surviving commercial buildings. The commercial building at 1244 Randolph Street dates from the 1840s, a rare survivor from the Antebellum period. Most of Detroit's expansion and development took place later.

At 12 stories, the steel-framed United Way Community Services Building (1895), at 1212 Griswold, originally known as the Chamber of Commerce Building, qualifies as Detroit's oldest existing skyscraper. The 10-story Hammond Building (1889), now demolished, is considered the city's first historic skyscraper. The Qube in the Detroit Financial District was developed on the Hammond Building site.

The city has numerous architecturally significant late-19th- and early-20th-century buildings and skyscrapers. Daniel Burnham, Louis Kamper, and the Smith Hinchman & Grylls firm are among the architects who designed some of the city's other important skyscrapers at the turn of the century which endure today. Burnham's three remaining Detroit skyscraper designs are the Neo-Classical styled Chrysler House (1912) — renovated in 2002, and the Neo-Renaissance Whitney (1915) and Ford (1909) buildings. Among their early projects, Smith Hinchman & Grylls designed the Neo-Gothic R.H. Fyfe Building (1919) at Woodward and Adams, now converted to a residential high-rise.

Detroit has preserved numerous historic buildings that are listed on the National Register of Historic Places. The city has many historic structures needing restoration. The most significant of these is the Michigan Central Station (1913) by Warren & Wetmore and Reed & Stem; it was bought by Ford in 2018 and is to be the center of a major multi-use development.

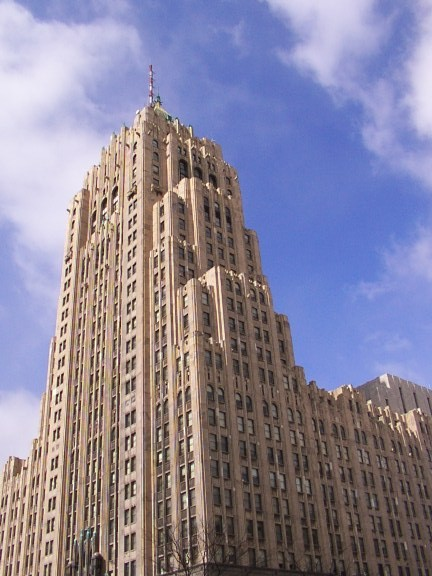
Fisher Building (pictured) and nearby Cadillac Place are designated National Historic Landmarks in the City's New Center area, both were designed by Albert Kahn.

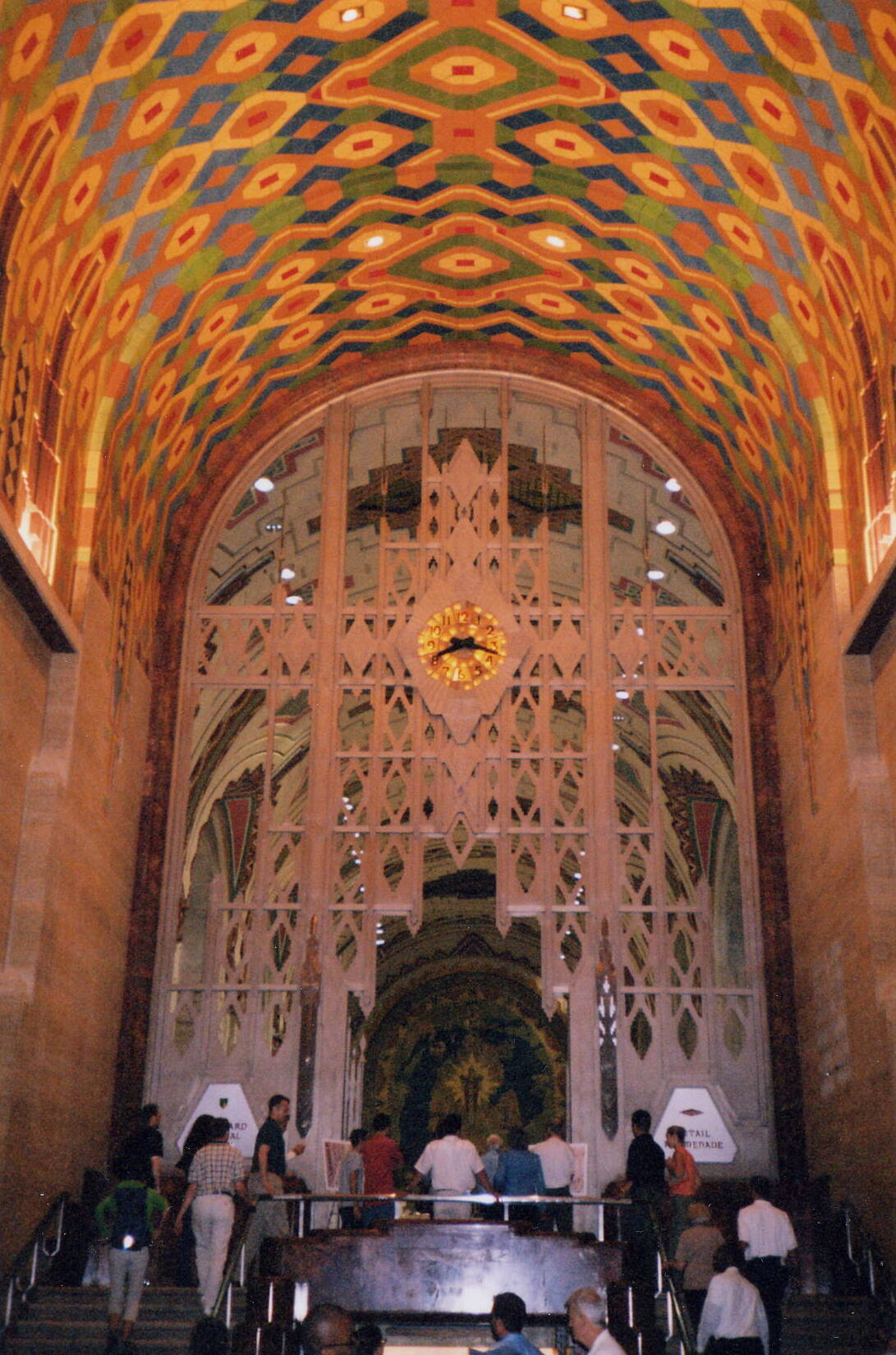
The Guardian Building, a National Historic Landmark by Wirt Rowland.

During the Roaring Twenties, Detroit's historic skyline arose. Louis Kamper designed the ornate Neo-Renaissance styled Book-Cadillac Hotel (1924), which was the world's tallest hotel when it opened.

The city's architectural legacy is rich in Art Deco style, with buildings constructed during the boom years of the 1920s. Joseph L. Hudson, the department store magnate, had commissioned architect Hugh Ferriss to produce a series of renderings depicting new buildings for the city skyline. Hudson's Department Store window displayed the Ferriss drawings to commemorate its fiftieth anniversary, and to celebrate the opening in 1927 of a new building for the Detroit Institute of Arts, a Beaux-Arts, Italian Renaissance-styled structure. Other architects created designs inspired by the Hugh Ferriss concepts, which included the Guardian Building, the David Stott Building, the J.L Hudson Building, and others.

Albert Kahn Associates designed what is now Cadillac Place (1923) for General Motors, featuring Neo-Classical architecture. Kahn, sometimes called the "architect of Detroit", originally worked for John Scott, who designed the Wayne County Building (1897). It opened as the second-largest office building in the world.

The seven Fisher brothers, who owned the automotive company Fisher Body, essentially gave architect Kahn a blank check to design and build the "most beautiful building in the world." This was the Fisher Building (1927) which, with its detailed work, has been called the city's "largest art object." Its opulent three-story, barrel-vaulted lobby is constructed with forty different kinds of marble. Albert Kahn Associates chief architect for the Fisher Building was Joseph Nathaniel French. The Fisher Building and Cadillac Place are among the National Historic Landmarks in Detroit anchoring the city's historic New Center.

Architect Wirt C. Rowland played an integral role in crafting the city's historic skyline with his designs for the Buhl, Penobscot, and Guardian buildings. Rowland's design for the Buhl Building (1925) included a Gothic Revival design, with a blend of Romanesque accents. Renowned Art Deco skyscrapers include Rowland's Penobscot (1928) and Guardian (1929), and John M. Donaldson's David Stott Building (1929). Architectural tiles made from Pewabic Pottery by American ceramist Mary Chase Perry Stratton are a prominent feature in the Guardian Building's facade and decor.

=== Tallest buildings ===
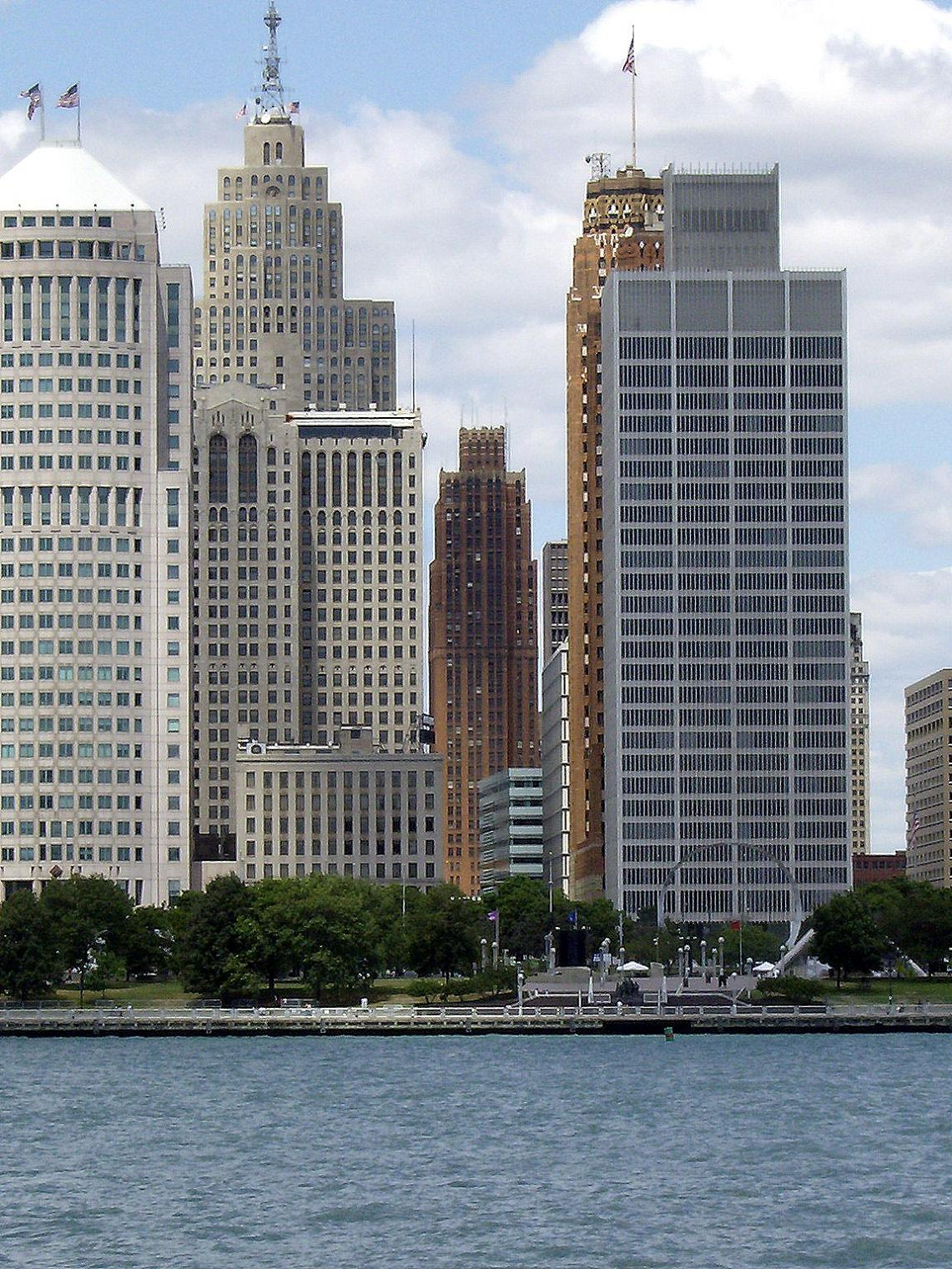
The Detroit Financial District contains buildings by architect Wirt Rowland including the Penobscot, Buhl, and Guardian.

Rank	Building	Height	Stories	Built	Notes
1	Detroit Marriott at the Renaissance Center	727 feet (222 m)	73	1977
2	One Detroit Center	619 feet (189 m)	43	1993
3	Penobscot Building	565 feet (172 m)	47	1928
T-4	Renaissance Center Tower 100	522 feet (159 m)	39	1977
T-4	Renaissance Center Tower 200	522 feet (159 m)	39	1977
T-4	Renaissance Center Tower 300	522 feet (159 m)	39	1977
T-4	Renaissance Center Tower 400	522 feet (159 m)	39	1977
8	Guardian Building	496 feet (151 m)	40	1929
9	Book Tower	475 feet (145 m)	38	1926
10	150 West Jefferson	455 feet (139 m)	26	1989

=== Contemporary highlights ===
The Detroit area also contains prominent skyscrapers designed in the Modern, Postmodern, and Contemporary Modern architectural styles. With the notable exception of the 1001 Woodward (1965) building, Detroit's skyscrapers show less influence by the Chicago school of architecture and are more eastern in character. Minoru Yamasaki designed Detroit's One Woodward Avenue (1962) in the Modern architectural style, following it with his similar, award-winning design for New York City's World Trade Center towers (1973-2001). Today, the city's contemporary skyscrapers stand beside restored historic ones. One Detroit Center (1993) and its neogothic spires is considered a fine example of post modern architecture by architects Philip Johnson and John Burgee, referring to Wirt Rowland's historic Penobscot Building (1928), both located in the heart of the Financial District's wireless Internet zone.

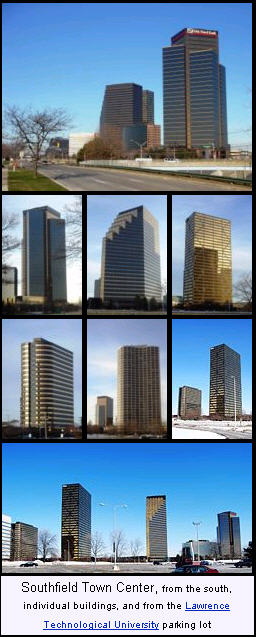

The office market in Metro Detroit is one of the nation's largest. with 147.88 million square feet (13,739,000 m^{2}). The Renaissance Center, with 5.552 million square feet (515,800 m^{2}), and the Southfield Town Center, with 2.2 million square feet (204,400 m^{2}), are large-scale examples of Contemporary Modern skyscraper complexes. Each mixed-use complex is an interconnected group of skyscrapers termed a "city within a city."

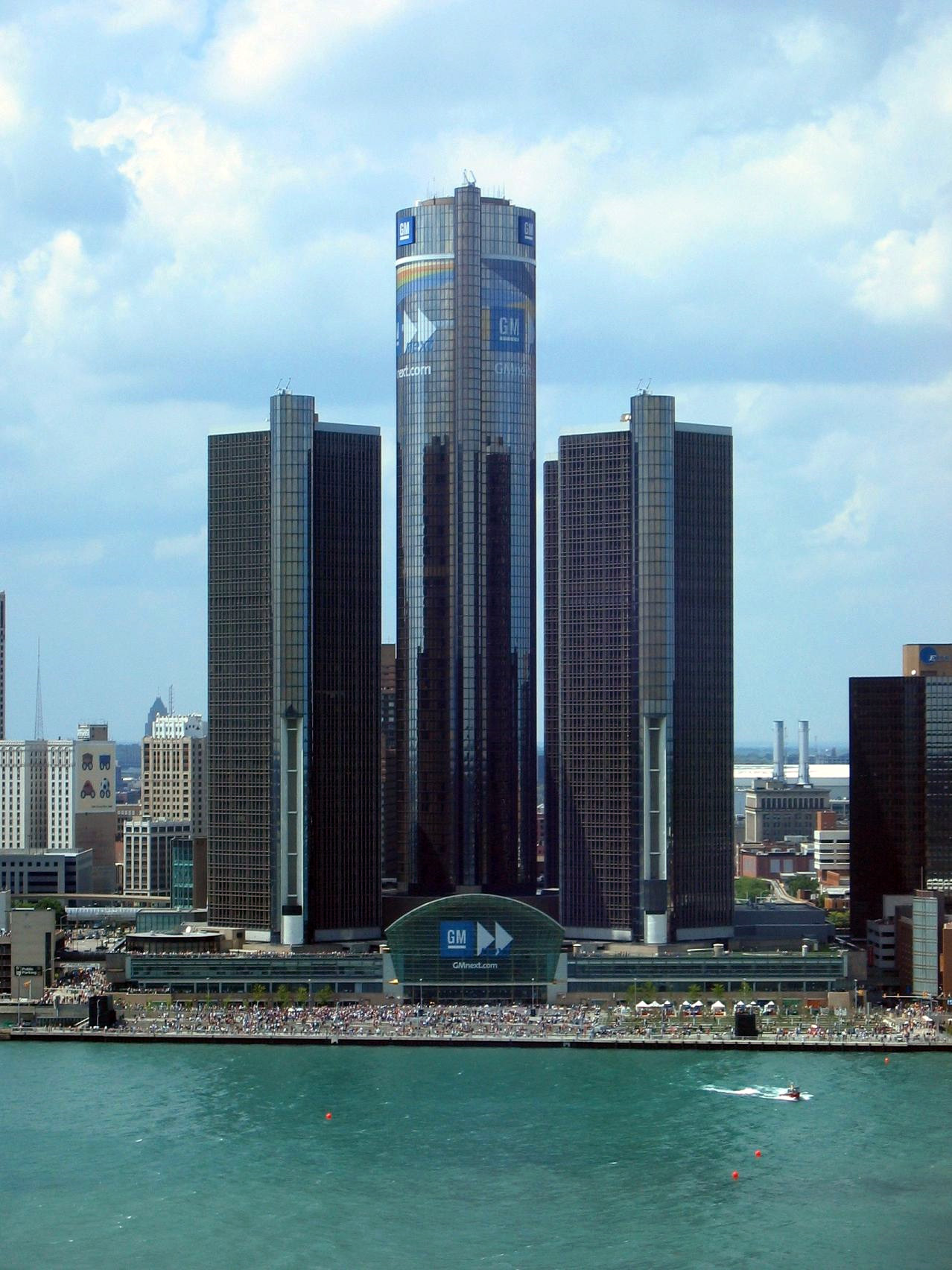
The Renaissance Center by John Portman on the International Riverfront, GM Wintergarden by Skidmore, Owings & Merrill.

The construction of the Renaissance Center in Downtown Detroit marked a new era for the city's architecture. In the 1970s, Detroit Renaissance, chaired by Henry Ford II, commissioned highly regarded architect John Portman to design an enormous skyscraper complex called the Renaissance Center in hopes of increasing the attraction of city living for middle and upper-class residents. Some left because of court-ordered busing to integrate schools that were de facto segregated based on residential patterns. Portman had hoped to halt the exodus.

Portman expanded on his earlier design for the Peachtree Plaza Hotel in Atlanta when designing the Renaissance Center in Detroit. He contributed to the popularity of the skyscraper hotel. (See Portman's Bonaventure Hotel in Los Angeles). In the ensuing decades, the Renaissance Center expanded to join the city's restored historic art deco skyscrapers in forming the current skyline.

In 1924, Detroit's Book-Cadillac opened as the world's tallest hotel (it is now a re-developed Westin Book-Cadillac Hotel). Completion of the first phase of the Renaissance Center in 1977 restored this distinction to the city. The Renaissance Center's central tower opened with a flagship hotel, the tallest in the world, and a conference center with the world's largest rooftop restaurant. As of 2012 the hotel is Marriott International's largest in the United States, with 1,298 rooms. Though it is no longer the world's tallest hotel, it remains the tallest all-hotel skyscraper in the Western Hemisphere. The Westin hotel and conference center at the Southfield Town Center is across from Lawrence Technological University.

Stemming the flight of capital from the city proved difficult, however, as the suburban office market continued to grow, notably in Southfield and Troy. The Southfield Town Center, constructed from 1975 to 1989, became easy to recognize with its marque of five golden glass skyscrapers. It attracted tenants in competition with the Renaissance Center as Metro Detroit's office market continued its suburban expansion.

Portman designed the Renaissance Center with interior spaces, yet secure. It quickly became a symbol of the city of Detroit. In 1996, the Renaissance Center's design changed when General Motors purchased the entire complex for its new headquarters. The $500-million makeover of the complex included a $100-million renovation of the hotel. A new front door Wintergarden (2003) provides waterfront views and expanded retail space. Prior to completion of its renovation in 2003, some had criticized its circular corridors as confusing. Construction of a lighted glass walkway now facilitates ease of navigation encircling the interior mezzanine. A pedestrian-friendly glass entry way has replaced the former concrete berms along Jefferson Avenue.

The city, together with the Riverfront Conservancy, undertook another major project planned at $559-million along the Detroit International Riverfront to construct a three-mile (5 km) riverfront promenade park along the east river from Hart Plaza and the Renaissance Center to the Belle Isle bridge. Detroit Wayne County Port Authority added the Dock of Detroit (2005), a state of the art cruise ship dock on Hart Plaza near the Renaissance Center. A two-mile (3 km) extension along the west river will take the riverfront promenade park from Hart Plaza to the Ambassador Bridge (1929) for a total of five miles (8 km) of parkway from bridge to bridge. Michigan constructed its first urban state park, the William G. Milliken State Park and Harbor (2003). Three contemporary high-rise casino resort hotels in Detroit include the MGM Grand Detroit (2007) by SmithGroup, Motor City Casino (2007), and the 30-story Hollywood Casino (2009). A fourth contemporary high-rise casino resort hotel, Caesars Windsor (1998/2008), is visible from the International Riverfront.

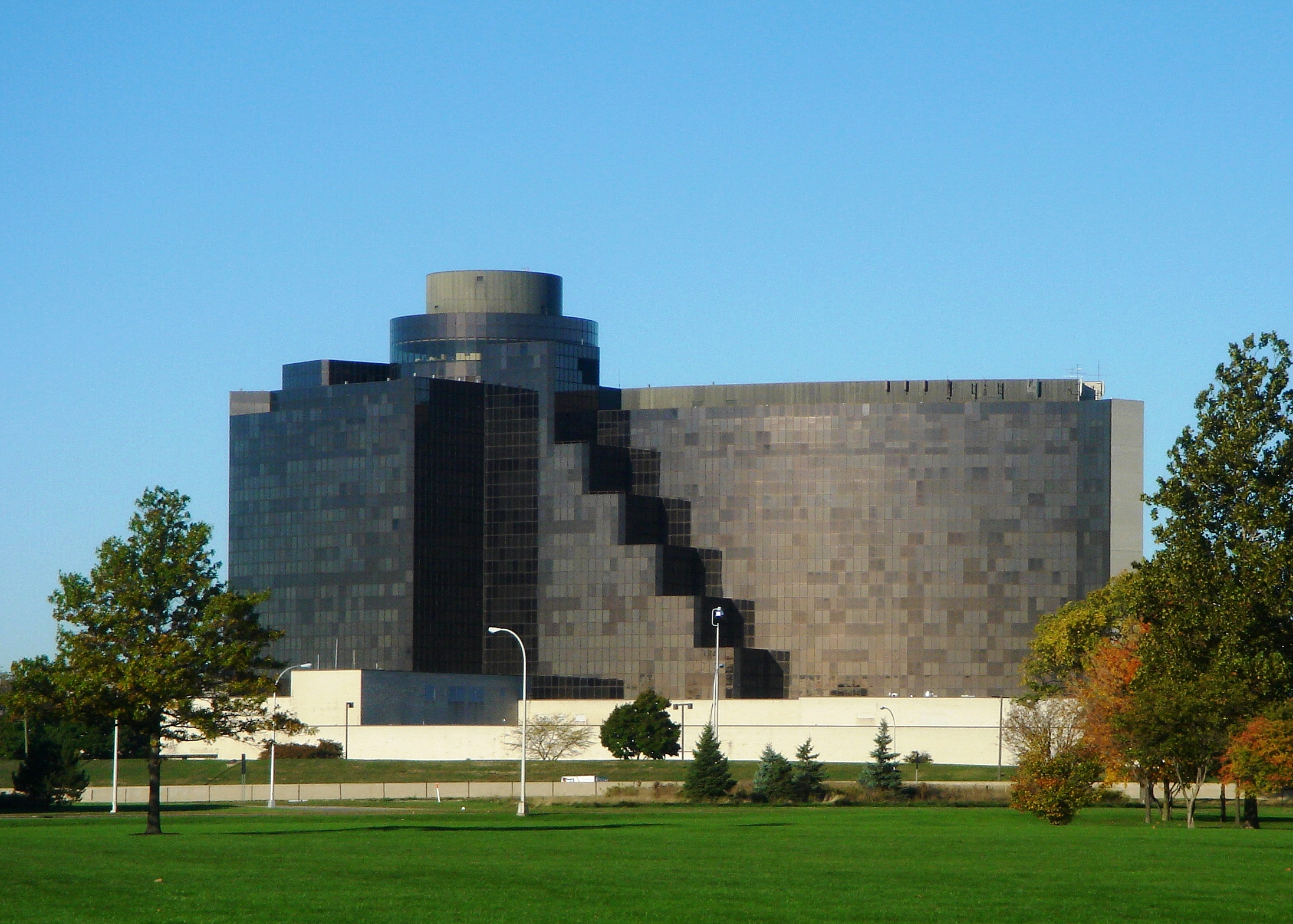
Dearborn's Adoba Hotel by Charles Luckman.

Besides the Town Center skyscrapers, Southfield's modern towers include the 26-story American Center (1975) by the SmithGroup and One Towne Square (1992) by Rossetti with 21-stories. Other notable centers of commerce in the area are Dearborn, Troy, and Auburn Hills. Dearborn contains the world headquarters of the Ford Motor Company. Dearborn's 14-story luxury Adoba Hotel (1976) with its contemporary arced design by Charles Luckman is among the region's conference centers, with 772 rooms. Rossetti designed Dearborn's modern Ritz-Carlton Hotel (1988) along with the complementary Fairlane Plaza North and South (1990) as well as the Parklane Towers (1973). Troy has a large number of office buildings, many of which are situated along the corridor of Big Beaver Road. The tallest of these is the Top of Troy (1975) building, a 27-story triangular tower. Troy also contains what is generally considered to be the most upscale shopping center in the region, the Somerset Collection.

The suburb of Auburn Hills is home to the 15-story Chrysler Headquarters and Technology Center with its 5.3 million square feet (490,000 m^{2}) on 504 acres (2.04 km^{2}). CRSS Architects designed the Chrysler Technology Center (1993) in a cross-axial formation where its elongated atrium topped concourses converge with an octagonal radiant skylight at its center. The SmithGroup designed the attached contemporary Chrysler Headquarters (1996) tower in golden glass crowned with the pentastar emblem. The nearby The Palace of Auburn Hills (1988) by Rosetti was a sports arena that served as a prototype for many others of its kind. The Palace was demolished in 2020 after sitting vacant for nearly 3 years with plans for the 110-acre site to be used for mixed use research and technology park.

=== Future development ===
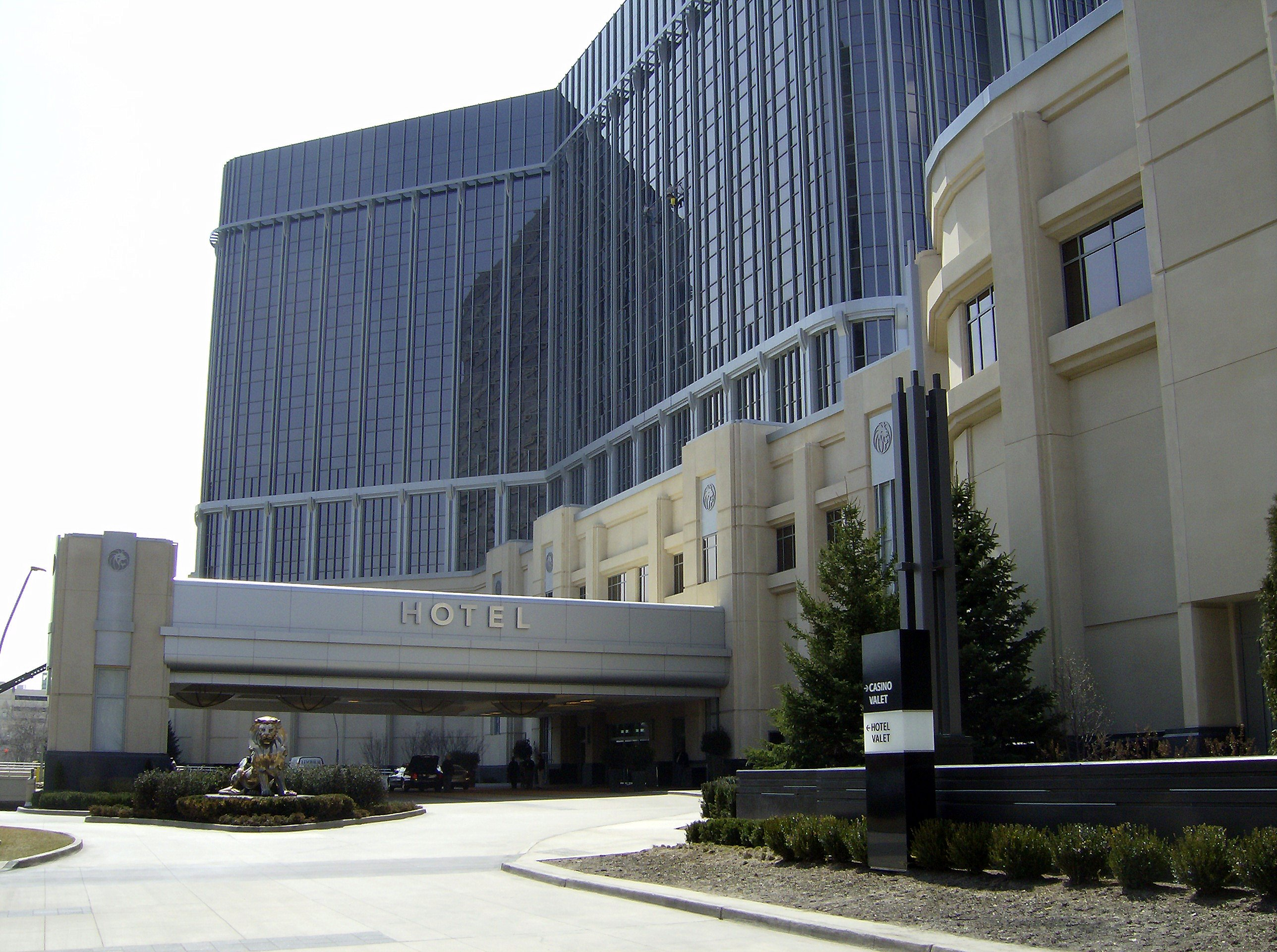
MGM Grand Detroit completed in 2007.

Between 1996 and 2006, downtown Detroit attracted more than $15 billion in new investment from private and public sectors. In 2011, Quicken Loans moved its company headquarters to downtown Detroit, consolidating suburban offices, a move considered to be of high importance to city planners to reestablish the historic downtown. Quicken Loans purchased office buildings in downtown Detroit and has considered new sites for new construction at the former Statler on Grand Circus Park and the former Hudson's location. Plans for a major residential and retail development adjacent to the Renaissance Center have been announced. In 2009, DTE unveiled a $50 million transformation of the landscape around its downtown headquarters into an urban oasis with parks, walkways, and a reflecting pool adjacent to the MGM Grand Detroit. Many residential lofts and high rises are under construction in the Detroit area. Renovation of historic buildings is a source of new development for the city of Detroit. The Inn at Ferry Street in the East Ferry Avenue Historic District and the Inn at 97 Winder in the Brush Park Historic District are examples of a successful Midtown restoration projects. Other historic restoration projects in Detroit include developments in the Midtown area, the Doubletree Guest Suites Fort Shelby, and the Westin Book-Cadillac Hotel. The QLine, which opened in 2017, serves as a link between the Detroit People Mover downtown and the future Ann Arbor–Detroit Regional Rail with access to DDOT and SMART buses.

In January 2008, the City of Detroit unveiled a concept for a new Cadillac Centre, a $150 million mixed-use residential entertainment-retail complex attached to the Cadillac Tower. Architect Anthony Caradonna designed the Cadillac Centre concept in the postmodern architectural genre known as deconstructivism similar to the Guggenheim Museum Bilbao. The 24-story steel and glass twin-towers complex to be located on Campus Martius has been placed on indefinite hold. The futuristic Cadillac Centre would be located in Detroit's historic Monroe block, once a collection of eight antebellum commercial buildings cleared in 1990. The Pavilions of Troy, a $380 million mixed-use complex, is concept planned for the suburban city of Troy. Metro Detroit is second largest source of architectural and engineering job opportunities in the U.S. The University of Michigan, the University of Detroit Mercy, and Lawrence Technological University offer architectural degree programs.

== Landmarks and monuments ==
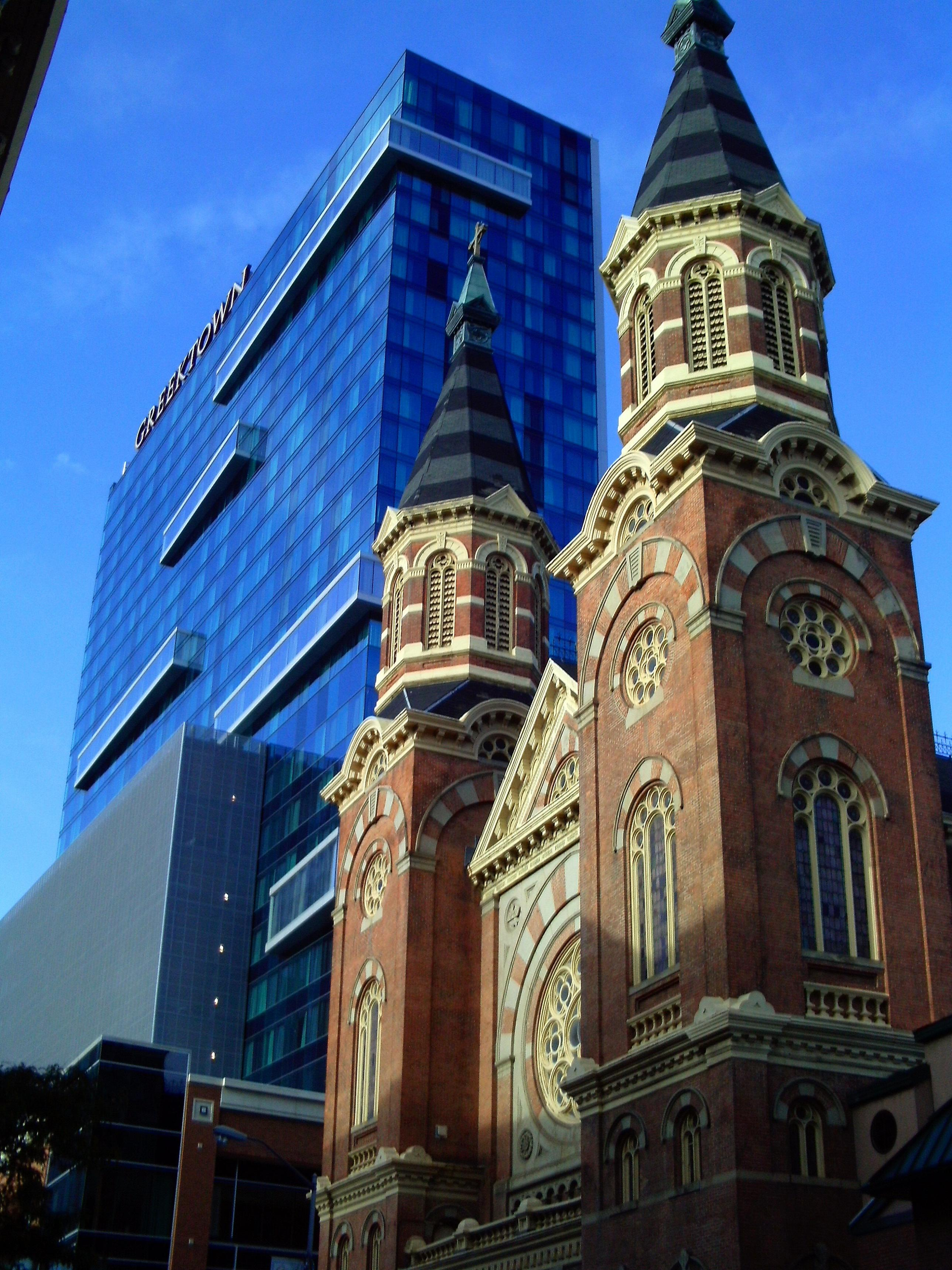
Romanesque style St. Mary Roman Catholic Church (1885) by architect Peter Dederichs in Greektown.

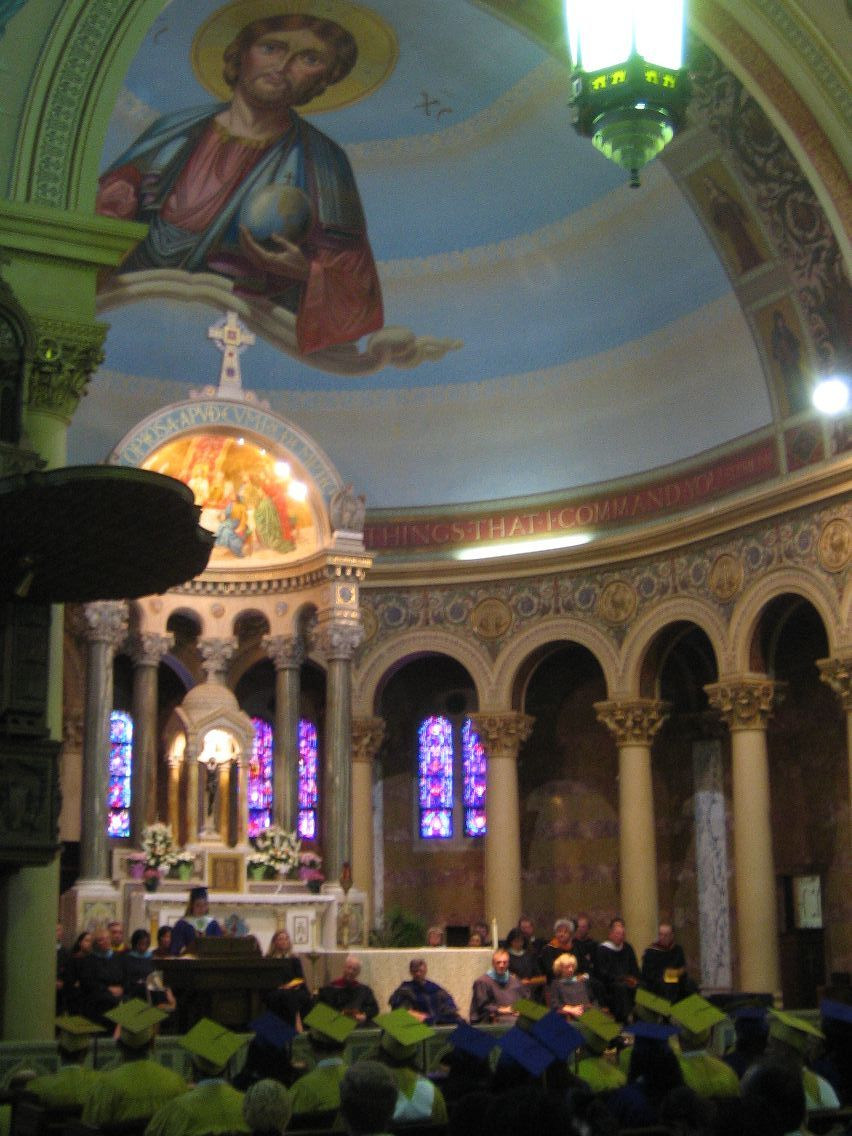
Most Holy Redeemer Church (1922) in Detroit by Donaldson and Meier

Founded in 1701, Detroit contains the second oldest Roman Catholic parish in the United States. Consequently, Metro Detroit's many churches and cathedrals, though too numerous to list, are among its architectural gems and sites in the National Register of Historic Places. Churches dominated the city's post Civil War era skyline. The Gothic Revival architecture of Ste. Anne de Detroit Catholic Church (1887) by Alert E. French and Leon Coquard includes flying buttresses, displaying the French influence. Ste. Anne's displays the oldest stained glass in the city, located near the Ambassador Bridge. The Gothic styled St. Joseph Church (1873/1883) in the Eastern Market-Lafayette Park neighborhood by Francis G. Himpler is an authentic German Catholic Parish and an important site listed in the National Register of Historic Places, noted for its architecture and stained glass. In another German parish, Peter Dederichs designed the Pisan Romanesque styled Old St. Mary's Church (1885) in Greektown. The Gothic Revival cathedral styled Sweetest Heart of Mary (1893) in the Forest Park neighborhood area by Spier and Rohns is the largest Roman Catholic Church in Detroit.

The Gothic Revival styled Cathedral of the Most Blessed Sacrament (1915) and the Cathedral Church of St. Paul (1911) by Ralph Adams Cram are both located along Woodward Avenue. Sculptor Corrado Parducci's work adorns many of Detroit's churches including the Cathedral of the Most Blessed Sacrament and the St. Aloysius Church (1930) in the Washington Boulevard Historic District. Among his Detroit projects, Gordon W. Lloyd designed the Christ Church (1863) at 960 E. Jefferson Avenue. Detroit's First Presbyterian Church (1891) is a fine example of Richardsonian Romanesque style by George D. Mason and Zachariah Rice. The Fort Street Presbyterian Church (1855), designed in a Victorian Gothic style with a steeple that rises 265 ft (81 m), is among the tallest churches in the United States.

The large concentration of Poles in the metropolitan Detroit resulted in a number of ornate churches in the Polish Cathedral style designed by noted architects. Henry Engelbert designed the Gothic styled St. Albertus (1885), Detroit's first Polish Catholic parish. Harry J. Rill designed St. Hedwig's (1915) and the Baroque styled St. Stanislaus (1913). Donaldson and Meier designed St. Hyacinth's (1924). Ralph Adams Cram designed the ornate Gothic styled St. Florian's Church (1928) at 2626 Poland Street in Hamtramck. Joseph G. Kastler and William B.N. Hunter designed the Victorian styled St. Josaphat's (1901) which has spires that line-up with the Renaissance Center towers when approaching the city on Interstate 75. The Historical Society at the Detroit Historical Museum provides information on tours of the area's many historic churches. The historic Beaubien House (c. 1851) at 553 East Jefferson houses the Michigan Society of Architects.

=== Campus Martius ===
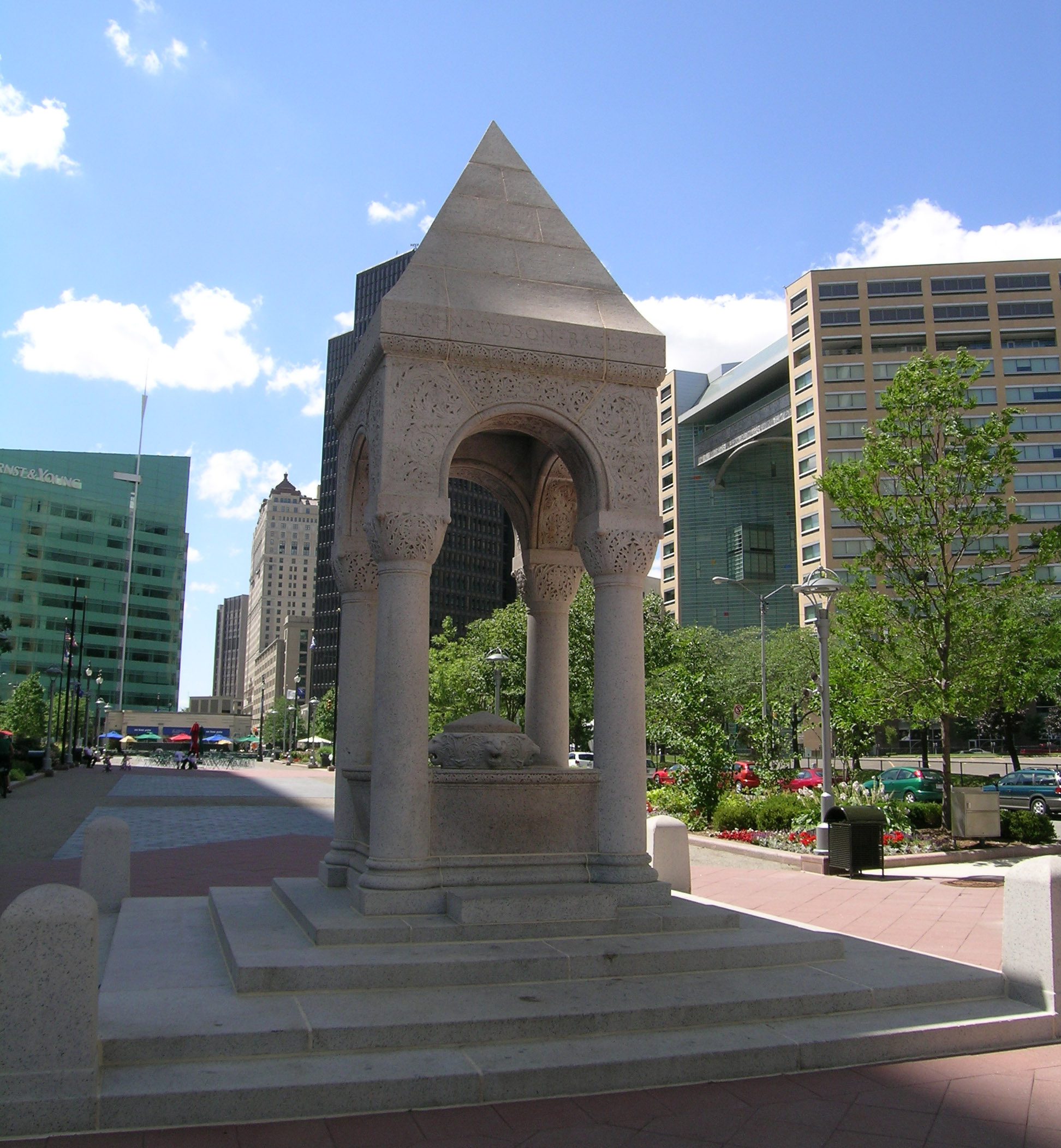
Bagley Memorial Fountain by Henry Hobson Richardson on Cadillac Square facing Campus Martius.

The city and its surrounding area have numerous monuments by noted architects and sculptors along tree-lined boulevards and parks just some of which are noted. Campus Martius is a park at the encircled confluence of Woodward and Michigan Avenues. It serves as one of the city's central gathering places for events. The park disappeared in the 1900s as the downtown reconfigured to accommodate increased vehicular traffic. In 2004, the city restored the park with traffic circle. Granite waterfalls are at the western edge of the north and south sitting gardens. The park has two stages for live entertainment. Greenways and flowering botanical gardens fan out from Woodward Fountain, the centerpiece of Campus Martius, which can jet water over 100 feet (30 m) into the air, while the Bagley Memorial Fountain sits nearby on Cadillac Square. Grand Circus is on Woodward Avenue, down the street.

Hart Plaza, along the riverfront, was designed to replace Campus Martius as a focal point. Yet Hart Plaza is a primarily hard-surfaced area, many residents came to lament the lack of true park space in the city's downtown area. This led to calls to rebuild Campus Martius. Compuware World Headquarters overlooks the reconstructed traffic circle surrounding Campus Martius Park with the historic Michigan Soldiers' and Sailors' Monument of the American Civil War by Randolph Rogers. The old Detroit City Hall (1861) was demolished in 1961. It was built by Alexander Chapoton of one of the city's oldest French families. The Queen Anne style Alexander Chapoton House (c. 1870) stands at 511 Beaubien.

=== Grand Circus ===
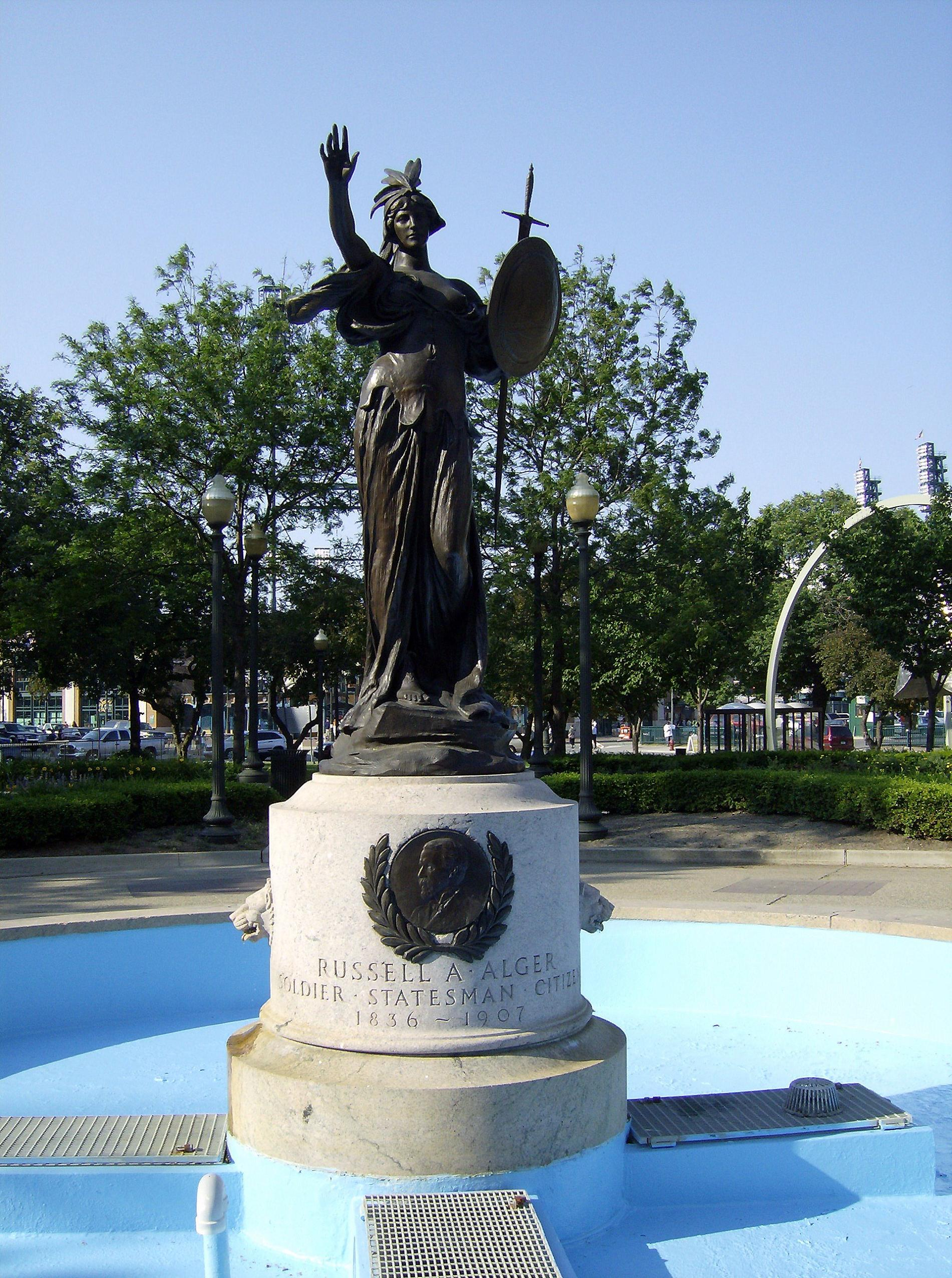
Russell Alger Fountain in Grand Circus by Daniel French and Henry Bacon.

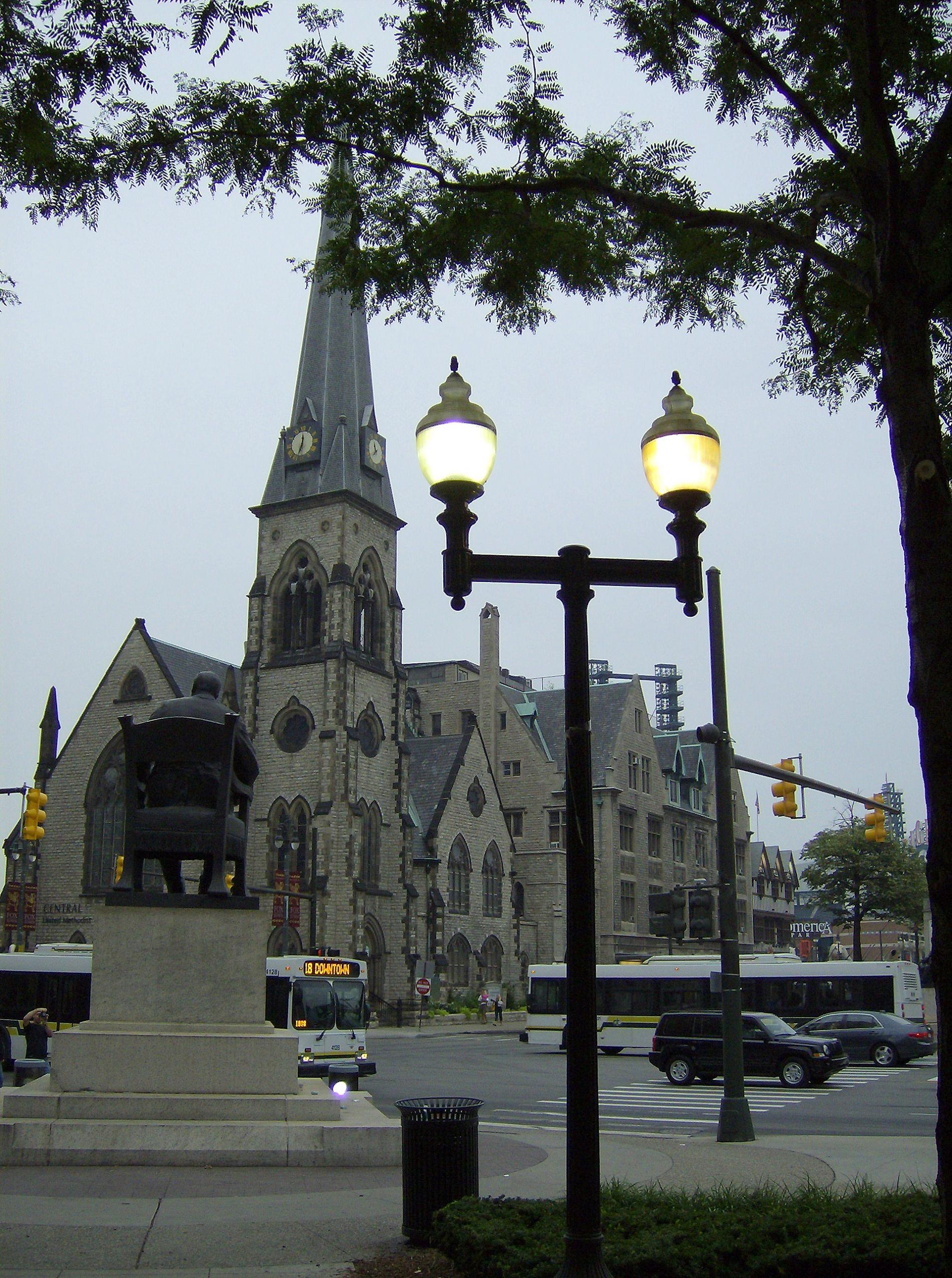
Victorian Gothic, Central United Methodist Church (1866) overlooks Grand Circus.

In 1805, Detroit experienced a devastating fire, which destroyed most of the city's French colonial architecture. Shortly afterward, Father Gabriel Richard said, Speramus meliora; resurget cineribus, meaning, We hope for better things; it will arise from the ashes, which became the city's official motto. For Detroit, Justice Augustus B. Woodward devised a plan similar to Pierre Charles L'Enfant's design for Washington, D.C. Detroit's monumental avenues and traffic circles fan out in a Baroque styled radial fashion from Grand Circus Park in the heart of the city's theater district.

Detroit's performance centers and theatres emanate from the Grand Circus Park Historic District and continue along Woodward Avenue toward the Fisher Theatre in the city's New Center. The ornate Fox Theatre (1928), by C. Howard Crane, near the Grand Circus is a National Historic Landmark which was fully restored in 1988. Crane also designed the Orchestra Hall along Woodward which is home to the Detroit Symphony Orchestra. In Gothic revival design, St. John's Episcopal Church (1861) stands across from the Fox Theatre and beside Comerica Park along with Woodward Avenue's vintage street lights. Restored in 1996, the Detroit Opera House (1922), by Crane, faces Grand Circus Park. The grounds include antique statuary and old-fashioned water fountains. Architect Henry Bacon designed the Russell Alger Memorial Fountain (1921) in Grand Circus Park. The Russell Alger Memorial Fountain contains a classic Roman figure symbolizing Michigan by renowned American sculptor Daniel French.

=== Neo-Renaissance and Neo-Classical ===
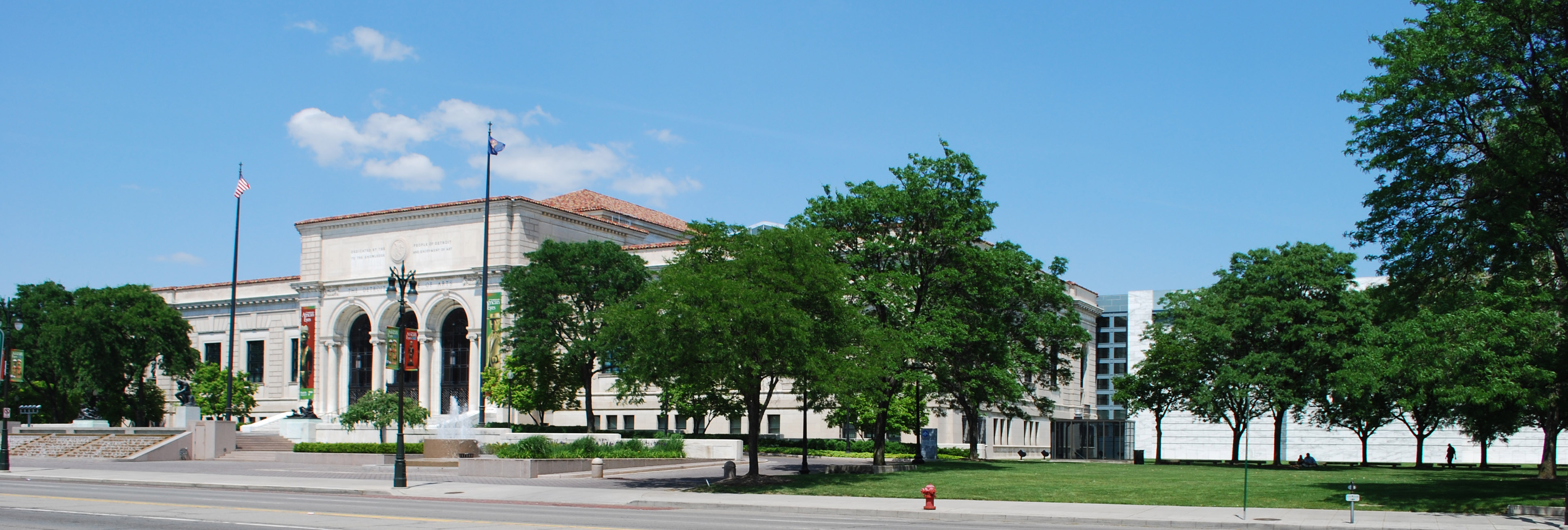
Detroit Institute of Arts by Paul Philippe Cret, with 2007 renovation and expansion by Michael Graves.

In the late 19th century, Detroit was called the Paris of the West for its architecture and open public spaces, in keeping with the City Beautiful movement. Architects John and Arthur Scott designed the Wayne County Building (1897) in downtown Detroit. Expense was not a factor in construction of its lavish design. Topped with bronze quadrigas by J. Massey Rhind and an Anthony Wayne pediment by Edward Wagner, it may be America's finest surviving example of Roman Baroque architecture with a blend of Beaux-Arts. Stanford White, architect of Newport, Rhode Island's Rosecliff mansion, designed Detroit's Neoclassical Savoyard Centre (1900) at 151 Fort St. Belle Isle Park provides panoramic views of city skyline along the Detroit International Riverfront.

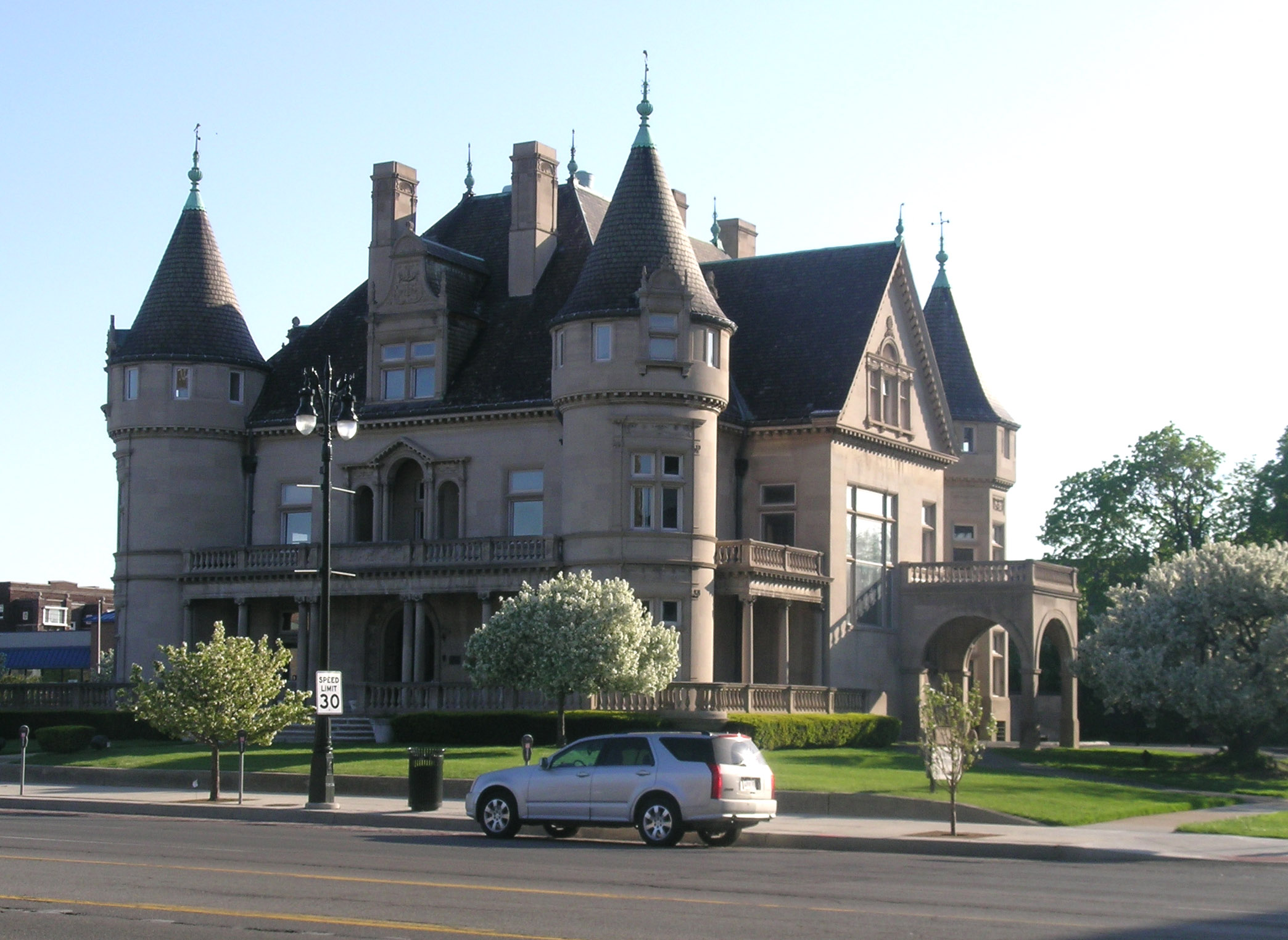
Col. Frank J. Hecker House (1891), 5510 Woodward, designed by Louis Kamper after Château de Chenonceaux.

The French-American architect Paul Philippe Cret designed the Detroit Institute of Arts which includes a 1,150-seat theatre in the Detroit's Cultural Center Historic District. Cret was educated at the École des Beaux-Arts in Lyon then in Paris, and came to the United States in 1903 to teach at the University of Pennsylvania. Cret was also the architect of the Folger Shakespeare Library in Washington, D.C. Michael Graves designed the 2007 renovation and expansion of the Detroit Institute of Arts with its exterior covered in white marble. Harley, Ellington and Day designed the marble Neoclassical Horace Rackham Education Memorial Building (1941) also within the Cultural Center Historic District.

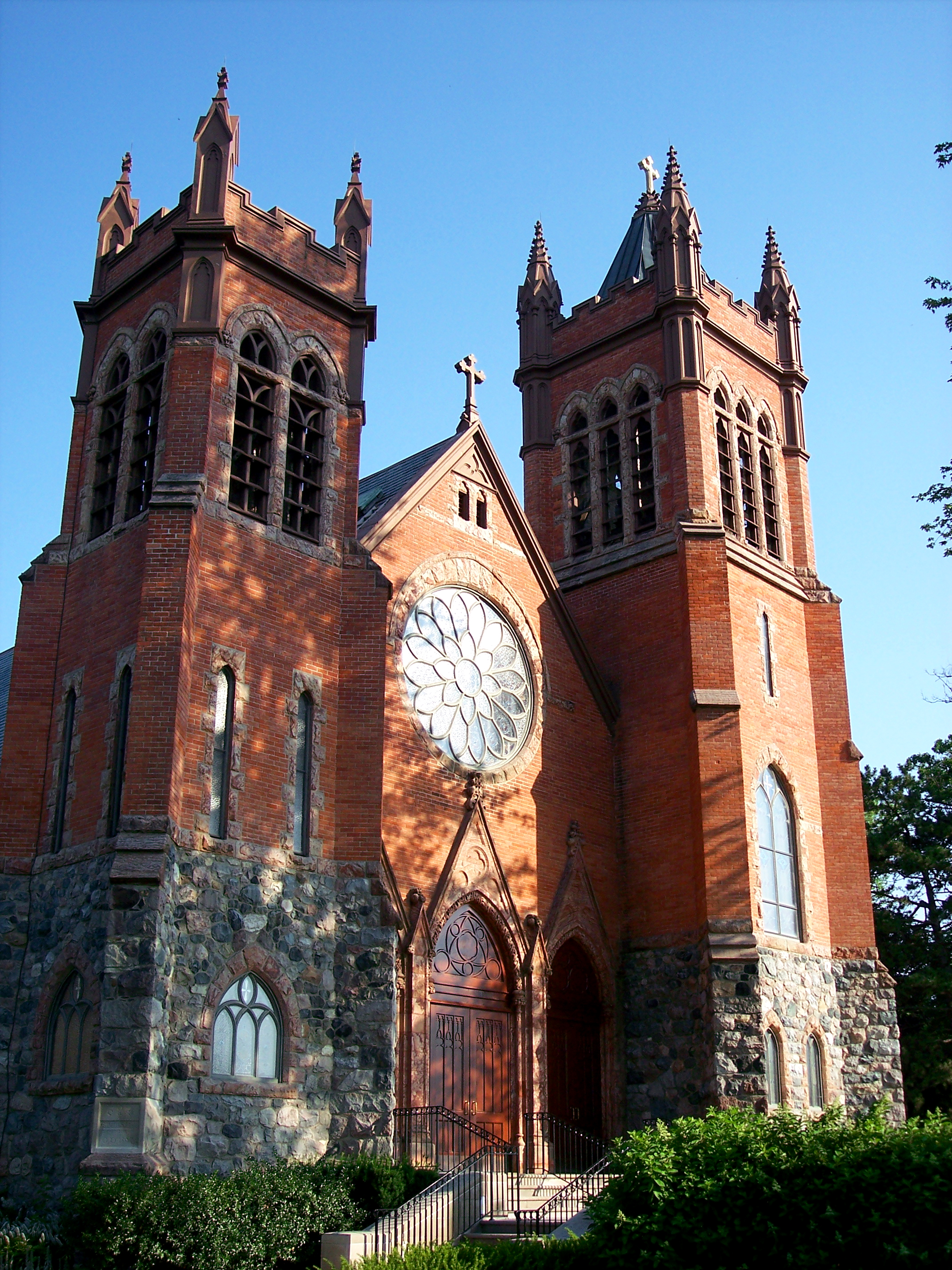
French Gothic styled St. Paul Catholic Church (1899) in Grosse Pointe is among Metro Detroit's many historic churches.

The Detroit area is home to light houses, yacht clubs, and many unique monuments. Examples include the Grosse Pointe Yacht Club (1929) and the Beaux-Arts Hurlbut Memorial Gate (1894) at Waterworks Park. The Detroit Historical Society has compiled an incomplete list with more than 122 public sculptures and monuments just near the downtown area, while Detroit1701 lists many additional downtown monuments. Architects such as Cass Gilbert who designed the United States Supreme Court in Washington, D.C. also designed the marble Detroit Public Library (1921) in the Cultural Center Historic District and Belle Isle's exquisite marble James Scott Memorial Fountain. Frederick Olmsted, landscape architect of New York City's Central Park, designed Detroit's 982-acre (3.97 km^{2}) Belle Isle park. Marshall Fredericks' sculptures, which include the Spirit of Detroit, may be seen throughout the metropolitan area. Sculptor Corrado Parducci's work adorns many notable Metro Detroit buildings such as the Meadowbrook Hall mansion, the Guardian Building, the Buhl Building (1925), the Penobscot Building, the Fisher Building and the David Stott Building.

Metro Detroit's many architecturally significant landmarks extend beyond the city and include the French Gothic St. Paul on the Lake Catholic Church (1899) by Harry J. Rill in Grosse Pointe Farms, Kirk in the Hills Presbyterian (1958) in Bloomfield Hills by Wirt C. Rowland, and Christ Church Cranbrook (1928) by Bertram Goodhue in Bloomfield Hills.

Eliel Saarinen was the architect for the Cranbrook Educational Community in the Metro Detroit suburb of Bloomfield Hills. Eliel's son, the famed modernist Eero Saarinen, designed a complex of buildings in the suburb of Warren, Michigan for General Motors known as the GM Technical Center. Sculptor Carl Milles' numerous works in Metro Detroit include those at Cranbrook Educational Community in Bloomfield Hills, Michigan such as Mermaids & Tritons Fountain (1930), Sven Hedin on a Camel (1932), Jonah and the Whale Fountain (1932), Orpheus Fountain (1936), and the Spirit of Transportation (1952) at the Detroit Civic Center.

== Residential architecture ==
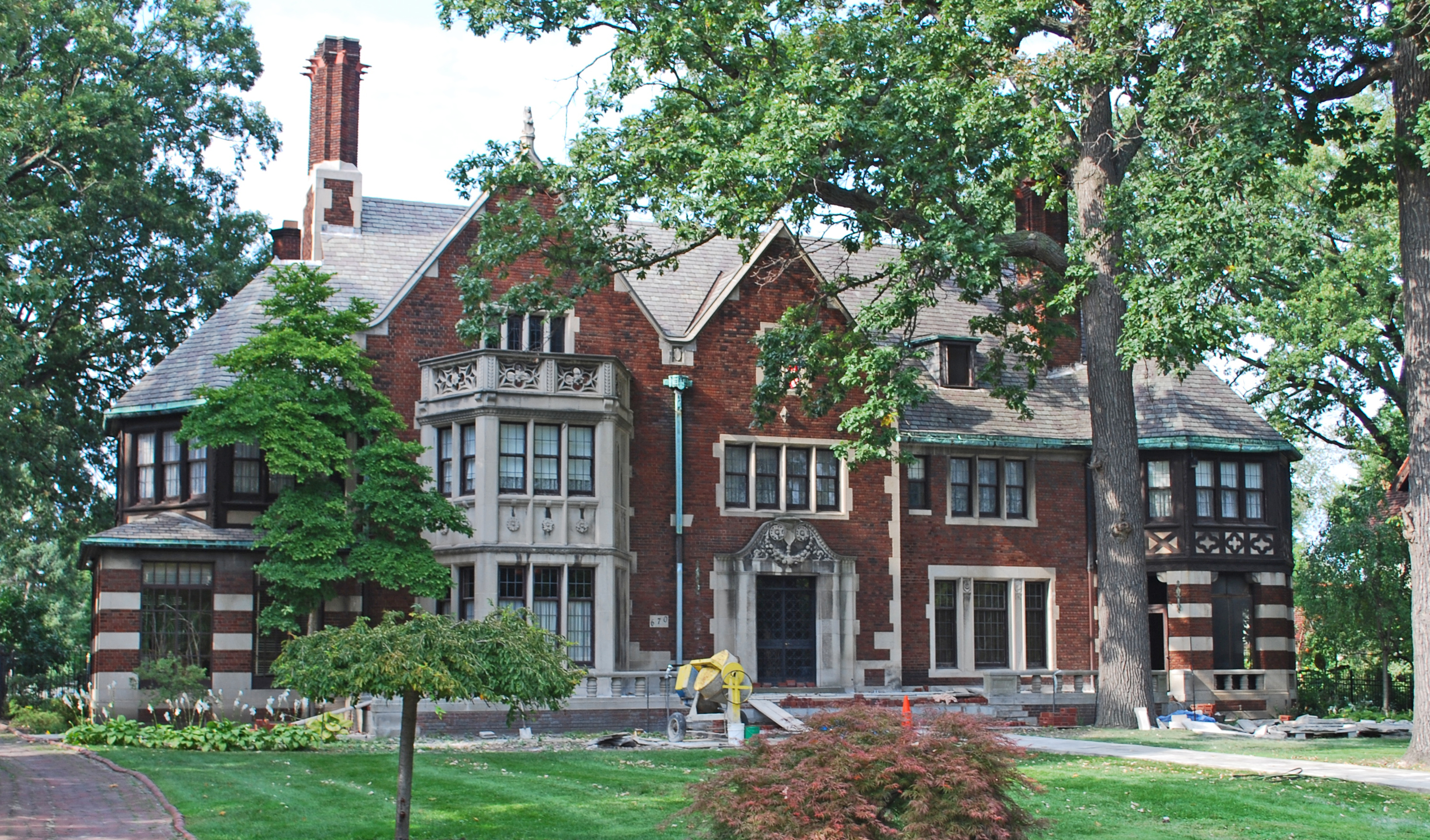
Tudor revival style mansion of Charles T. Fisher, president of Fisher Body corporation in Detroit's Boston-Edison Historic District designed by architect George Mason.

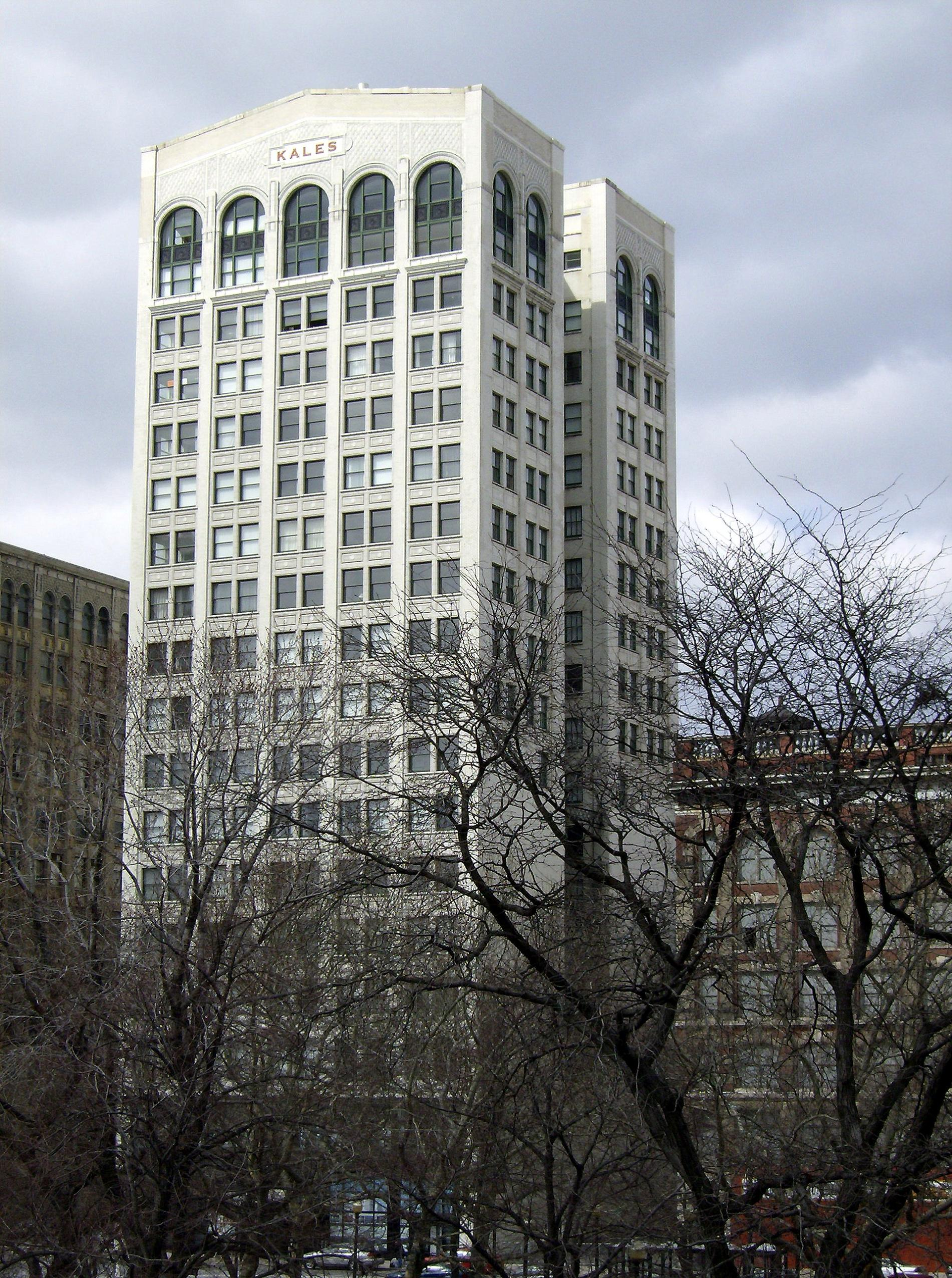
The Park Avenue Historic District contains various renovations. Originally designed by Albert Kahn, developers converted the Kales Building into a residential high-rise with retail in 2004.

Downtown and New Center areas contain high-rise buildings, while the majority of the surrounding city consists of low-rise structures and single-family homes. The city's neighborhoods constructed prior to World War II feature the architecture of the times with wood frame and brick houses, larger brick homes in middle-class neighborhoods, and ornate mansions throughout the city's many historic districts and nearby suburbs such as Grosse Pointe. The oldest city neighborhoods are along the Woodward and Jefferson corridors, while newer city neighborhoods are found in the west and northeast.

High-rise residential buildings are found in neighborhoods along the International Riverfront and East Jefferson Avenue residential area extending toward Grosse Pointe and the Palmer Park neighborhood West of Woodward on the city's North end. Ludwig Mies van der Rohe designed a residential development for Detroit's East side Lafayette Park (1958–1965), including three high-rise residential buildings and over 200 townhouses. A successful 78-acre (320,000 m^{2}) urban renewal project, this development is the largest concentration of buildings designed by Mies van der Rohe in the world. Lafayette Park is near the architecturally significant St. Joseph's Catholic Church and the Eastern Market Historic District. The East side contains many architecturally distinctive homes such as those in the Indian Village and East Jefferson Avenue.

Some of the oldest extant working-class neighborhoods include those in the Southwest such as Corktown, established by Irish immigrants and those in the middle-class West Vernor-Junction area. The Southwest is seeing redevelopment and construction of new homes and condos due in part to the city's expanding Mexicantown area surrounding Clark Park, which is near the architecturally significant Most Holy Redeemer Church and Ste. Anne de Detroit Catholic Church.

Detroit neighborhood historic districts contain notable residential architecture from the Gilded Age. Many architecturally significant late-19th- and early-20th-century mansions have been restored, such as those in Midtown's Brush Park neighborhood. The West Canfield, Woodbridge, and East Ferry Avenue neighborhoods are examples of Midtown's restored French Renaissance Revival, Second Empire, Romanesque, and Queen Anne architecture. Noted architect Gordon W. Lloyd designed the David Whitney House (1894) constructed with a jasper stone exterior. The Whitney House is now a fine restaurant at 4421 Woodward Avenue in Midtown. The East Canfield area nearby contains the Gothic Revival styled Sweetest Heart of Mary Catholic Church.

Arden Park-East Boston (a National Historic district comprising Arden Park Boulevard and East Boston Boulevard, running for three blocks east of Woodward near the New Center Area) is noted for mansions built by the industrial giants of the 1910s and 1920s. Residents included the Dodge Brothers, J. L. Hudson, and Fred Fisher, the founder of Fisher Body. Fisher's residence on Arden Park (George D. Mason, 1918, with additions in 1923) is constructed of Indiana limestone in the Italian Villa style. It features elaborate stone carvings and intricate ironwork and was the subject of a 1926 "Fortune Magazine" discussion of "the harmony of materials and proportion in residential architecture." The nearby Boston-Edison neighborhood (comprising four residential blocks west of Woodward) features several Kahn residences, including the Benjamin Siegal residence (1915), the James Couzens house (1910), and one of Kahn's rare stucco residences, the Ernest Venn house (1908). Additional architecturally significant homes in the neighborhood include the Sebastian S. Kresge house, the Berry Gordy house, and one of the Henry Ford houses. Many architecturally distinctive homes are also located near the University of Detroit Mercy on the city's North end such as those in Palmer Woods and Sherwood Forest historic districts. The Cathedral of the Most Blessed Sacrament is located near this corridor along Woodward Avenue.

Detroit's heritage includes works by Frank Lloyd Wright who had participated in the initial design for Henry Ford's Fair Lane Estate, a National Historic Landmark in Dearborn. Frank Lloyd Wright also designed the Dorothy H. Turkel House at 2760 West Seven Mile Rd., the Gregor S. and Elizabeth B. Affleck House at 1925 N. Woodward Ave., the Melvyn Maxwell and Sara Stein Smith House at 5045 Ponvalley Rd., and the Carlton D. Wall House at 12305 Beck Rd. in Plymouth Township.

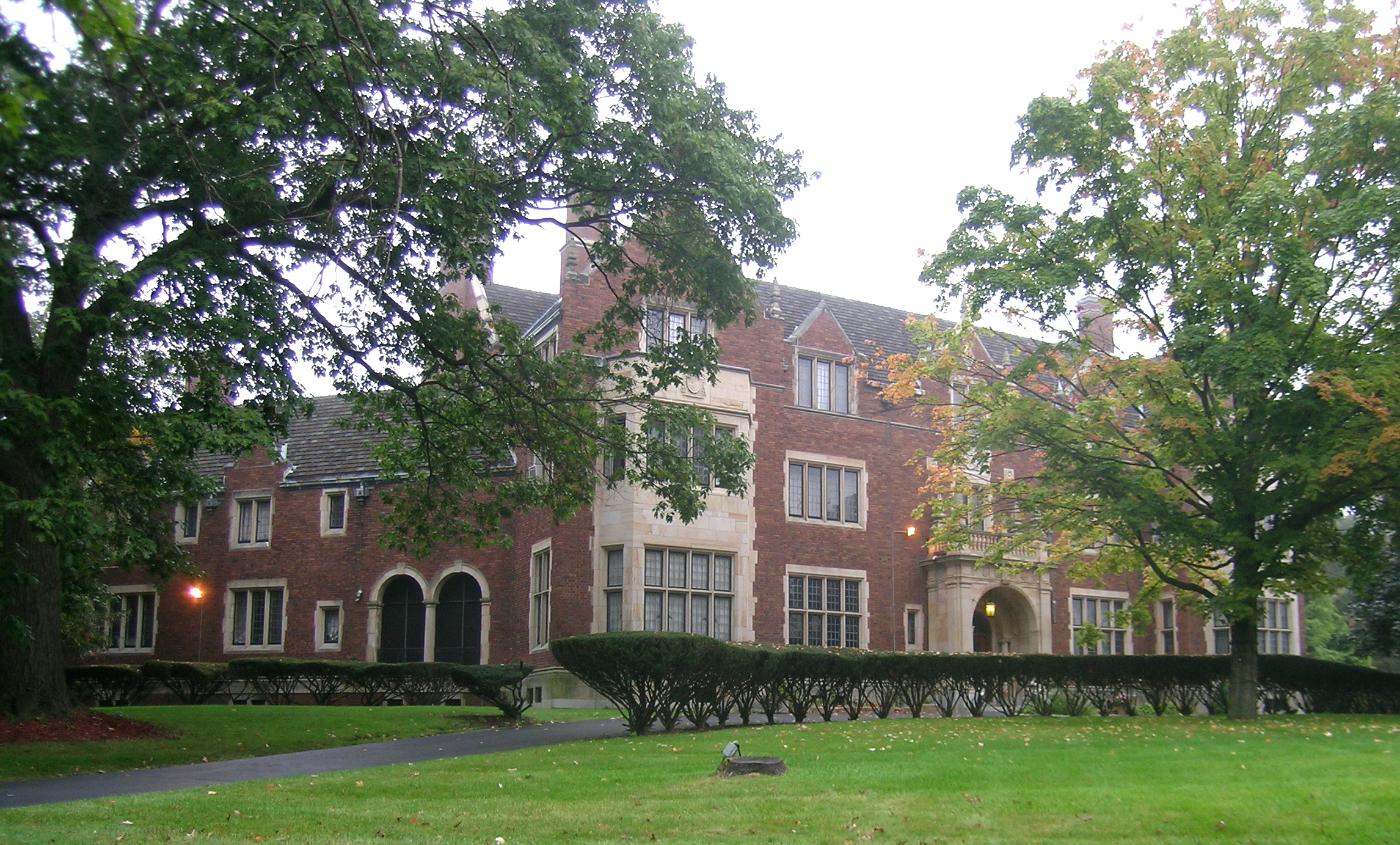
McGinnis and Walsh designed this 39,000 sq. ft. Tudor Revival mansion, known as the Bishop Gallagher House (1925), in Palmer Woods Historic District

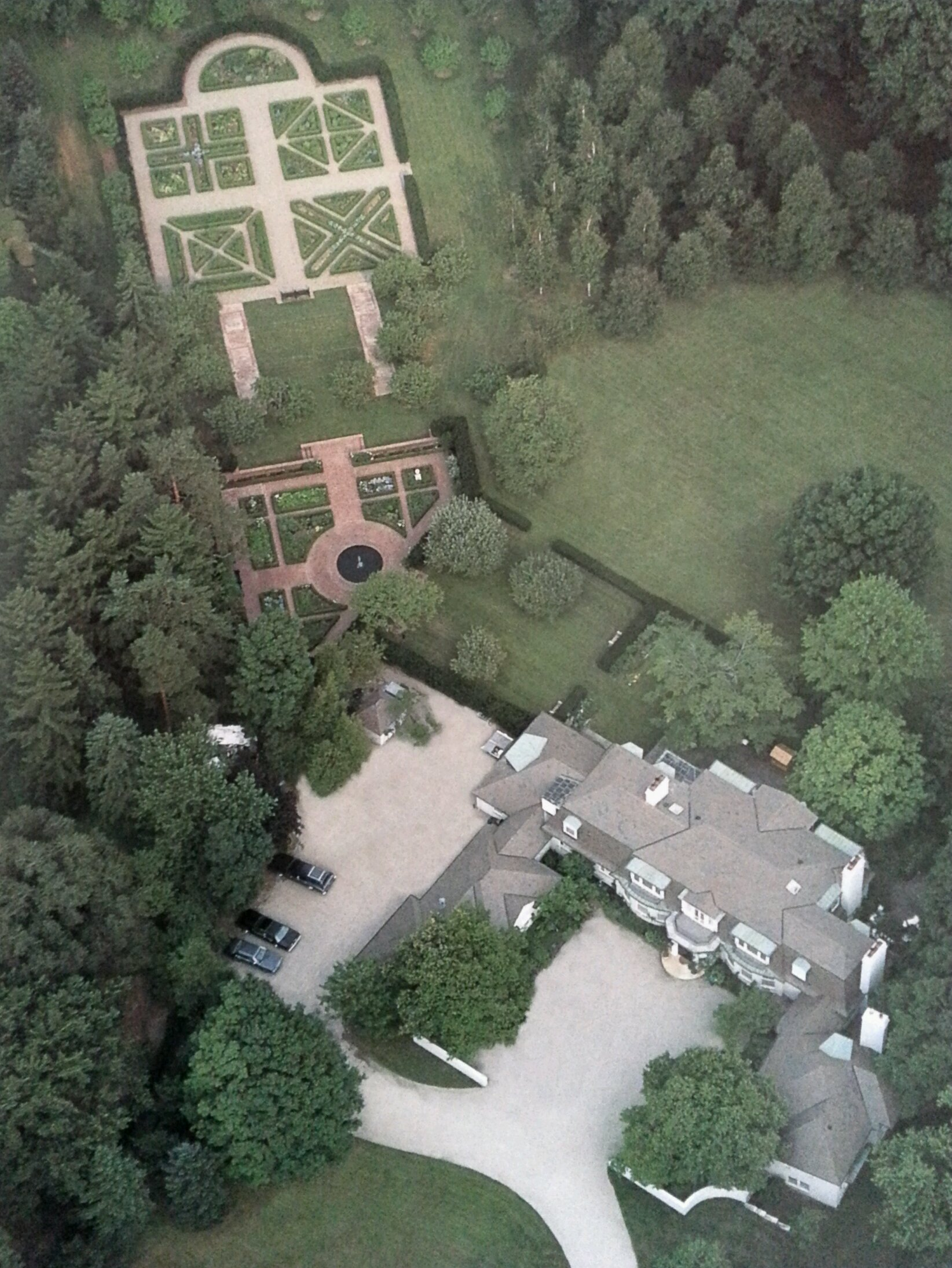
Woodland by Hugh T. Keyes, longtime Bloomfield Hills estate of John Bugas

The mansions of metropolitan Detroit are among the nation's grandest estates. Meadow Brook Hall (1929), the 110-room 88,000 sq ft (8,200 m^{2}) mansion of Matilda Dodge Wilson at 480 South Adams Rd. in the suburb of Rochester Hills, is the fourth largest in the United States. Listed in the National Register of Historic Places, the mansion is open to the public. The suburbs of Grosse Pointe and Bloomfield Hills are replete with grandiose mansions. Albert Kahn designed the Edsel and Eleanor Ford House (1927) at 1100 Lakeshore Dr. in Grosse Pointe which is open to the public. Rose Terrace (1934–1976), the mansion of Anna Dodge, once stood at 12 Lakeshore Dr. in Grosse Pointe. Designed by Horace Trumbauer as a Louis XV styled château, Rose Terrace was an enlarged version of the firm's Miramar in Newport, Rhode Island. A developer, the highest bidder for Rose Terrace, demolished it in 1976 to create an upscale neighborhood. This gave a renewed sense of urgency to preservationists. The Dodge Collection from Rose Terrace may be viewed at the Detroit Institute of Arts. The Italian Renaissance styled Russell A. Alger Jr. House (1910), at 32 Lakeshore Dr., by architect Charles A. Platt serves as the Grosse Pointe War Memorial. The five Grosse Pointe communities feature a variety of newer and early-twentieth-century mansions which flank the shores of Lake St. Clair, one of the finest examples being Woodley Green (the Benson Ford House, 1934) by Hugh T. Keyes (considered "one of the most prolific and versatile architects of the period"). Bloomfield Hills also contains vast estates from the early to mid 20th century, such as Albert Kahn-designed Cranbrook House on Saarinen's Cranbrook campus (called by The New York Times "one of the greatest campuses ever created anywhere in the world"). Next door on Vaughan Rd. is Keyes-designed Woodland, the estate of John Bugas.

There have also been some newer redeveloped upscale subdivisions in the Grosse Pointe, Bloomfield Hills, and Turtle Lake areas.

== Photo gallery ==
Skyscrapers
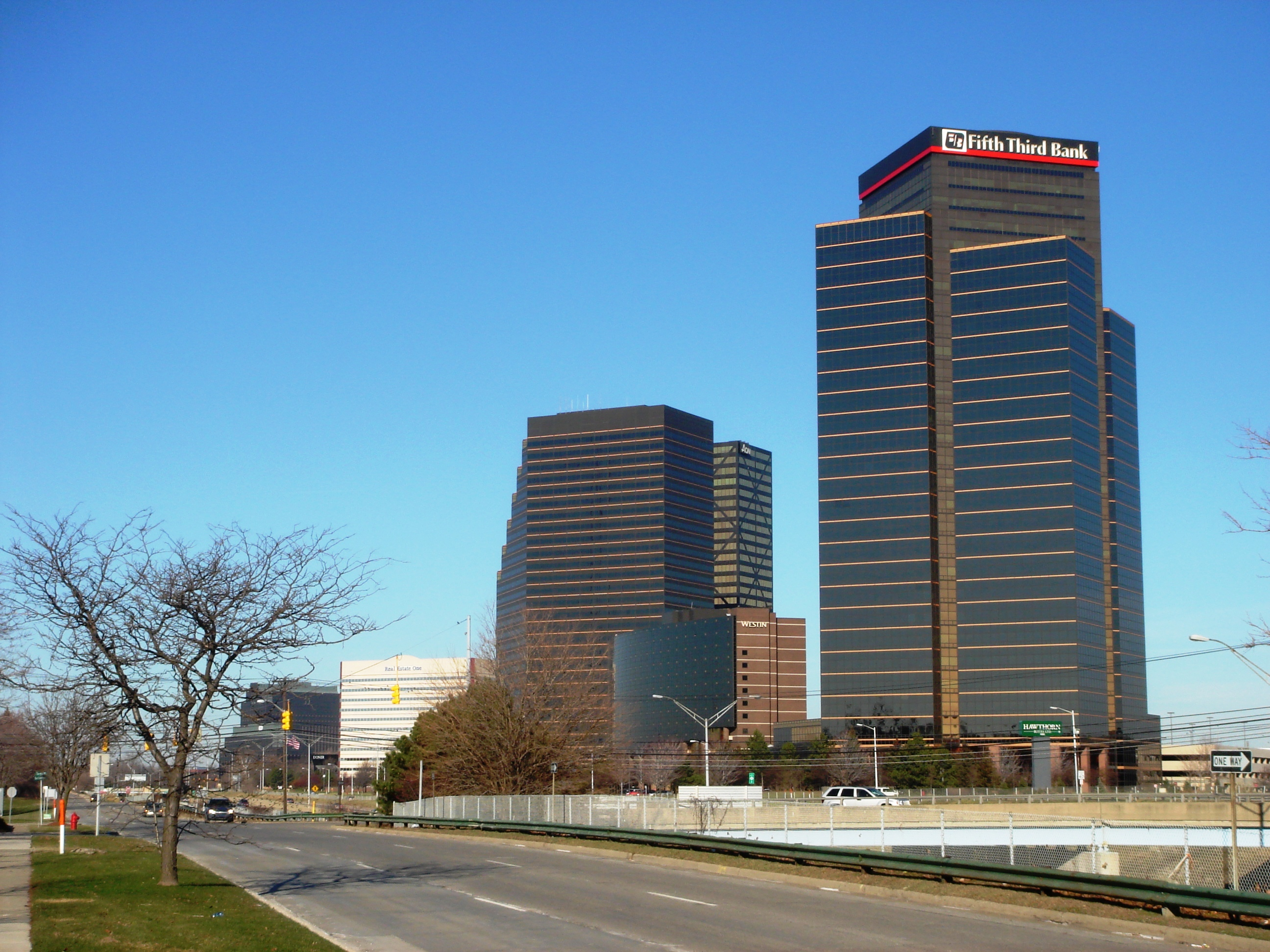
Southfield Town Center
by Neuhaus & Taylor,
3D International,
and Sikes Jennings Kelly & Brewer

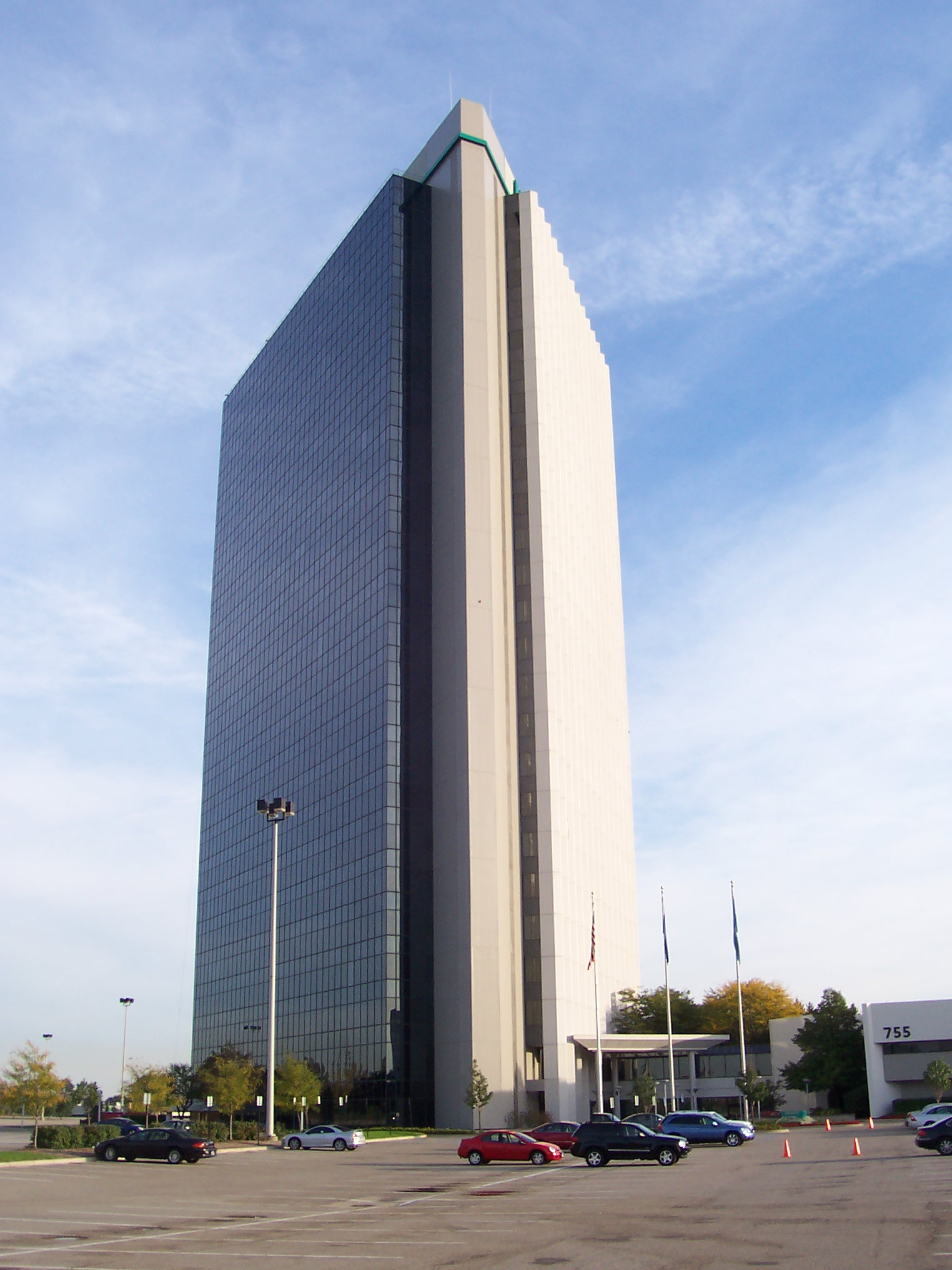
The Top of Troy in Metro Detroit by Rossetti

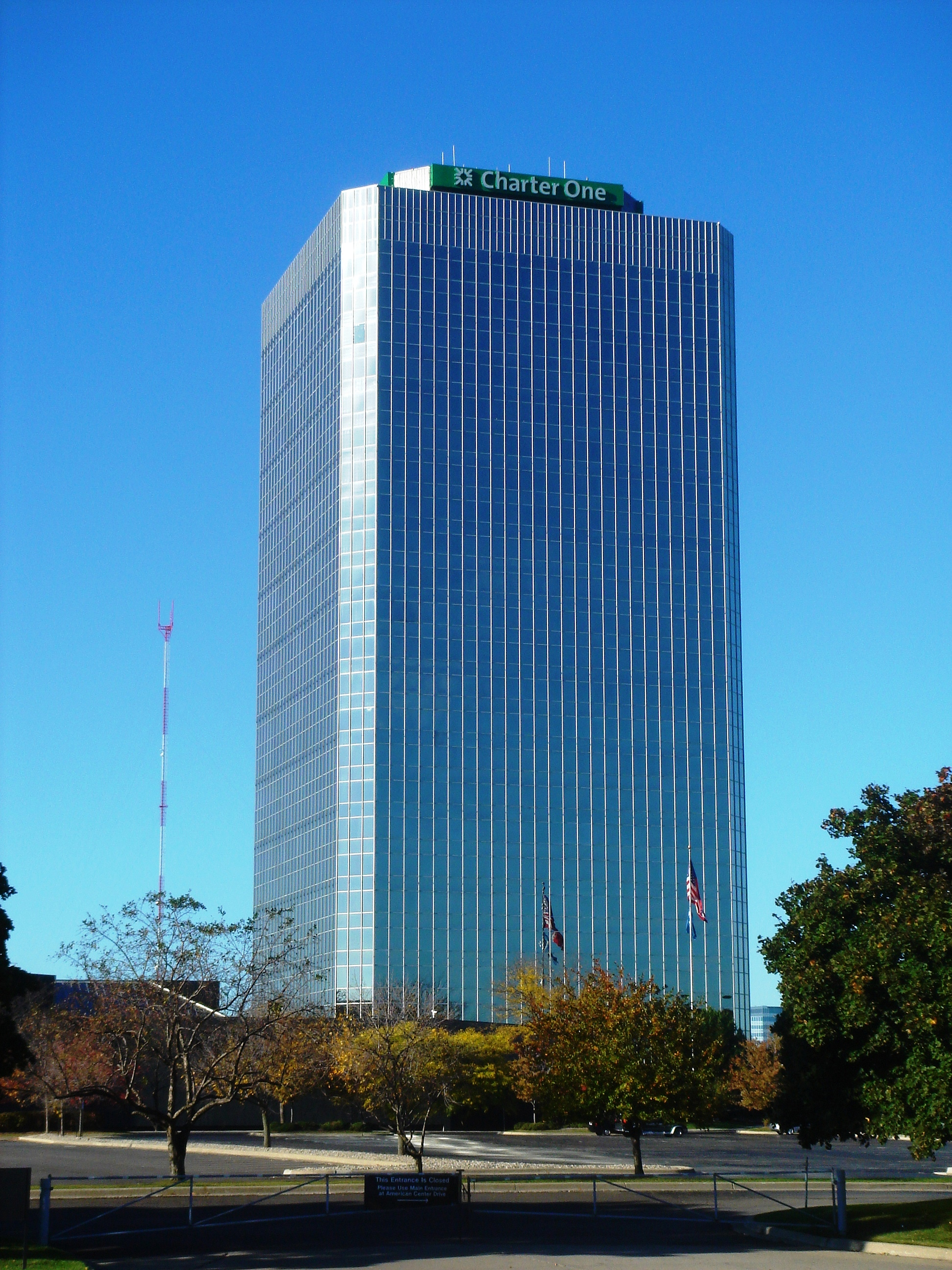
American Center in Southfield by the SmithGroup

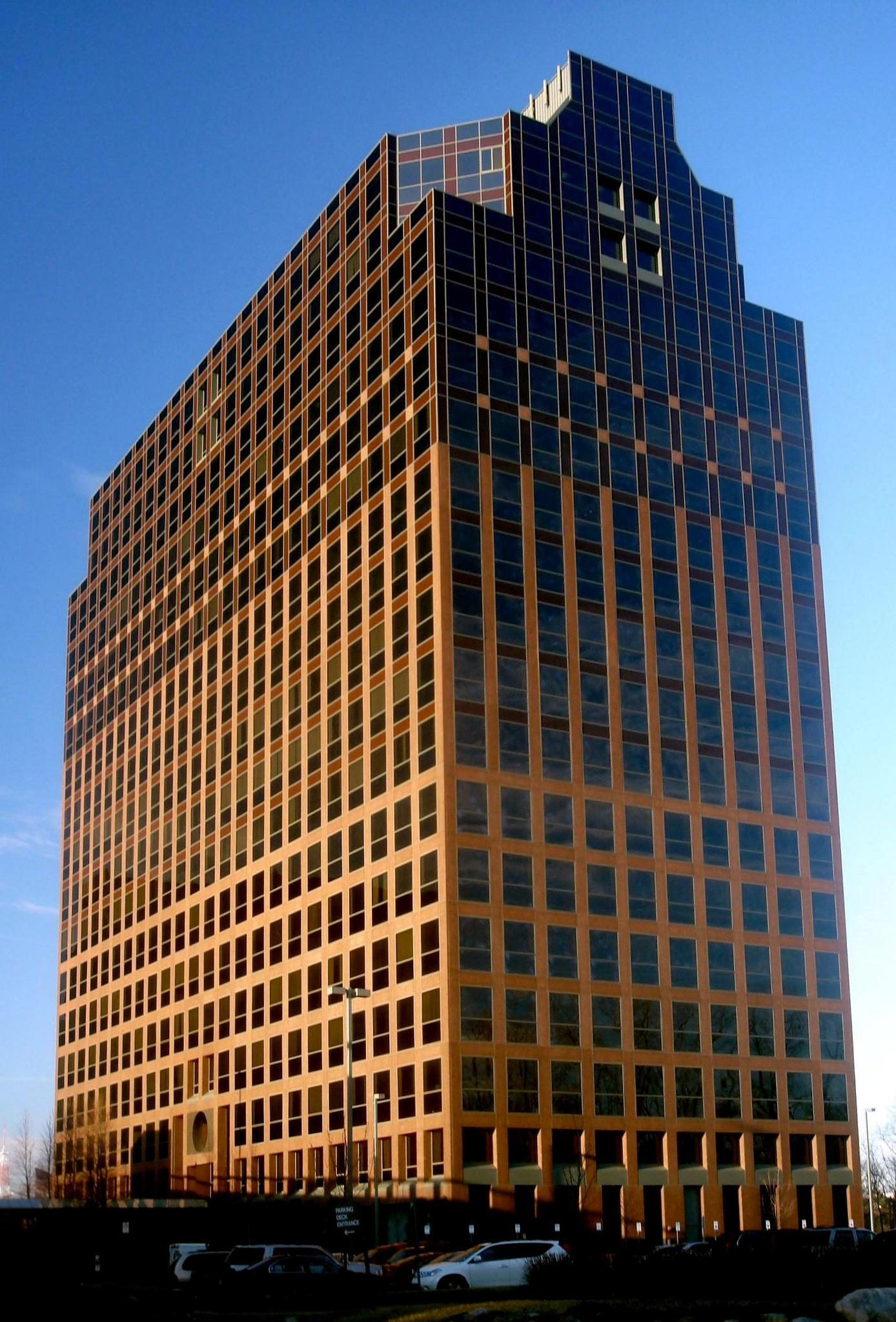
One Towne Square in Southfield by Rossetti

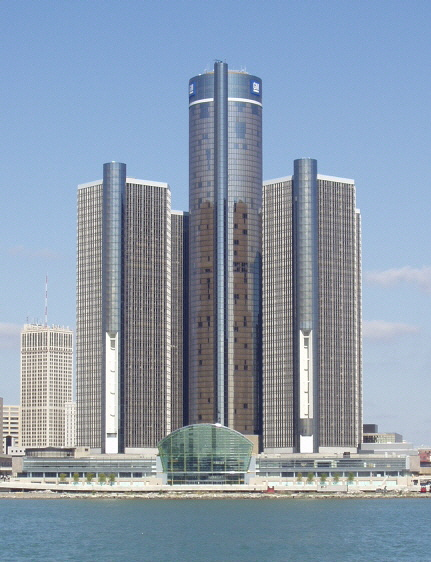
Renaissance Center by John Portman

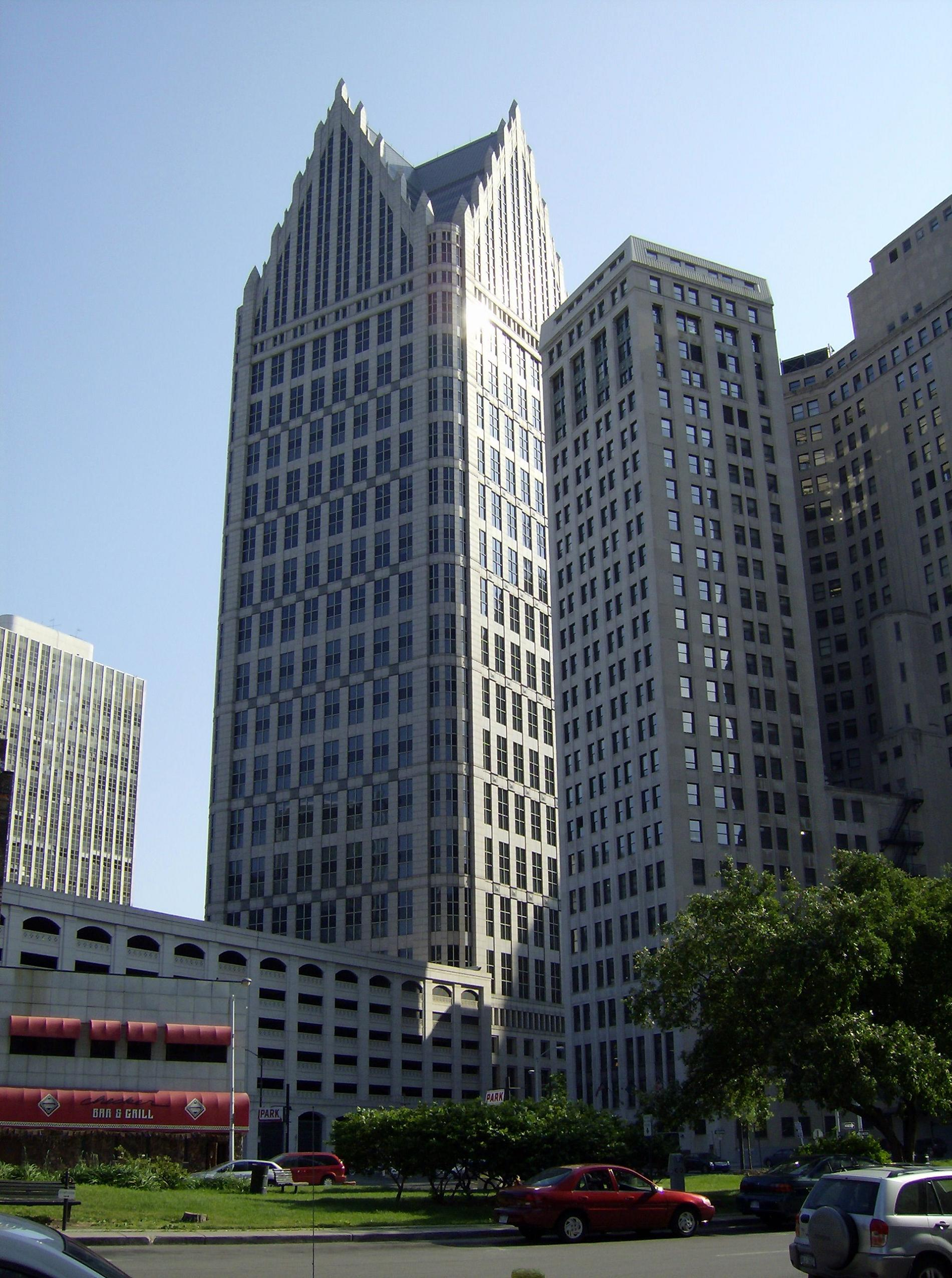
One Detroit Center by John Burgee and Philip Johnson

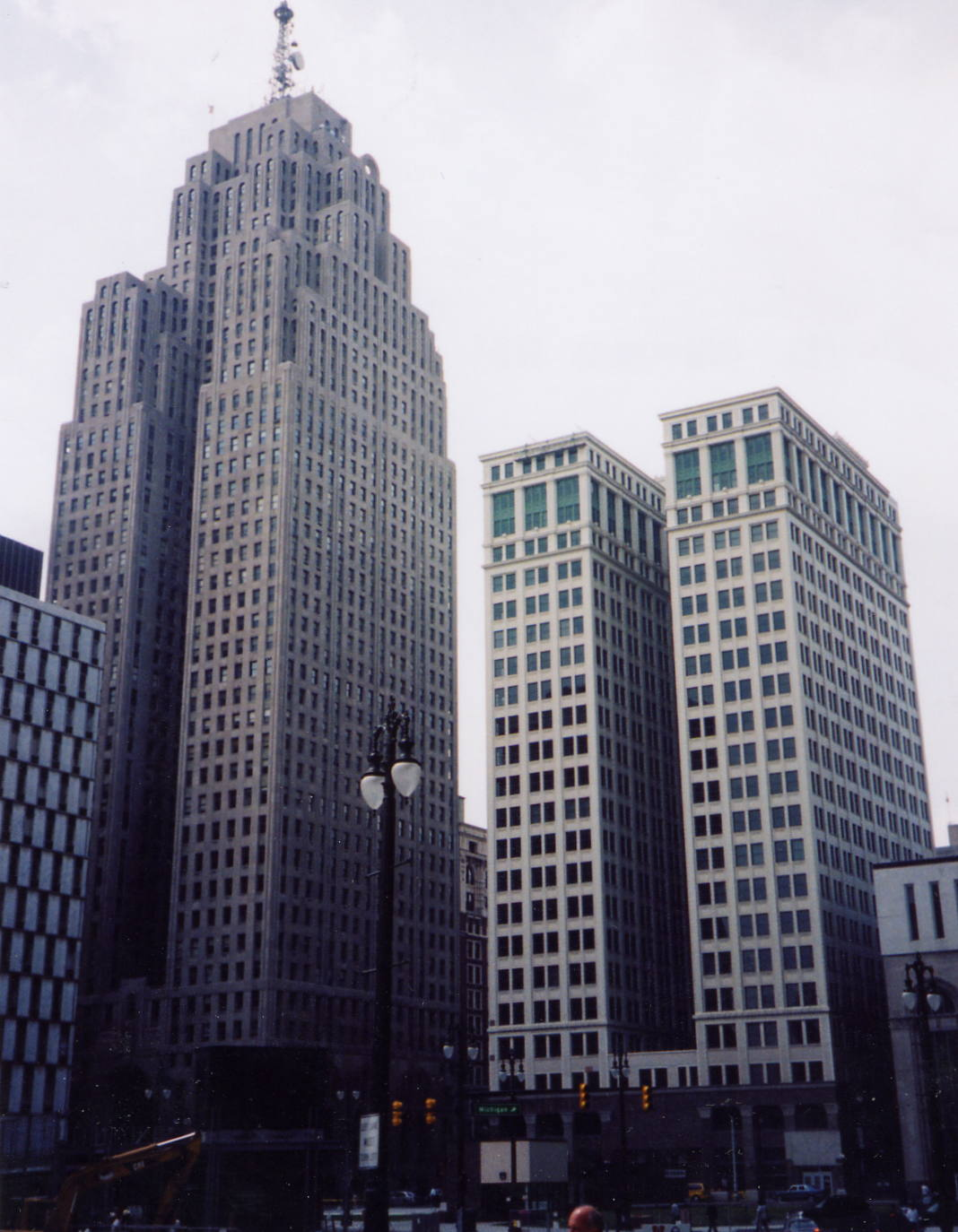
Penobscot Building (left)
by Wirt Rowland with the Chrysler House
by Daniel Burnham

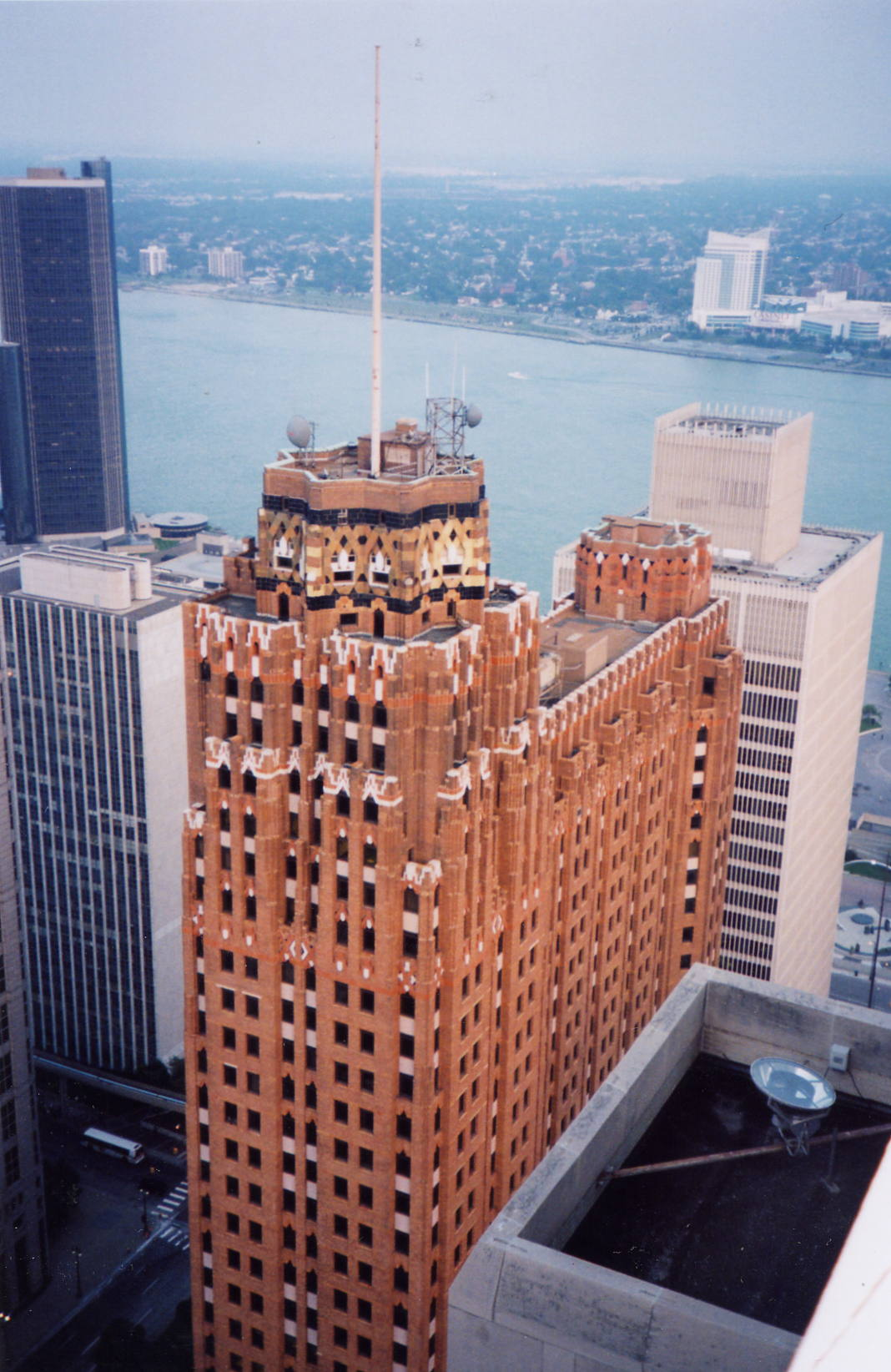
Guardian Building
by Wirt Rowland

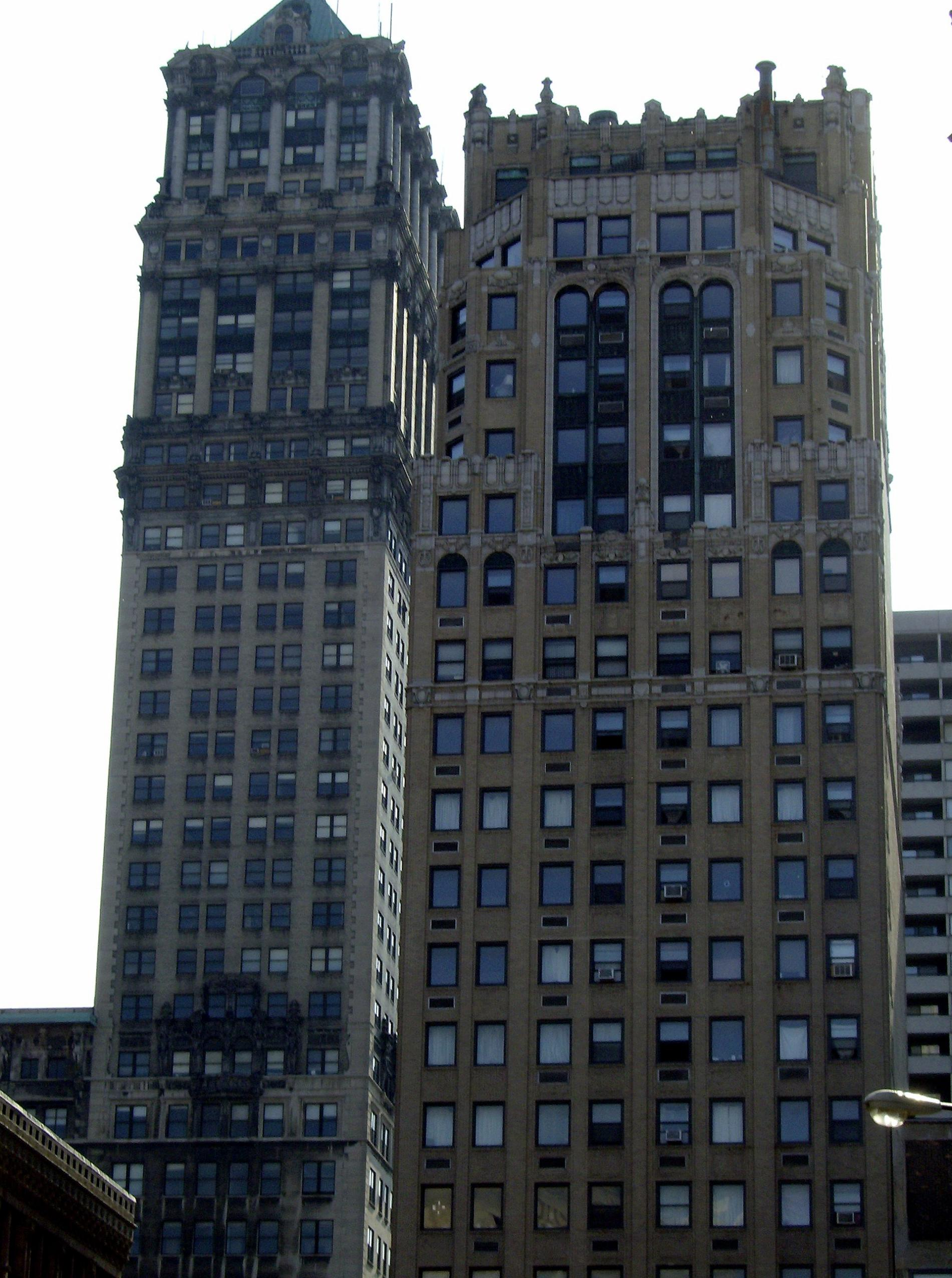
Book Tower (left) and Industrial-Stevens, both by Louis Kamper

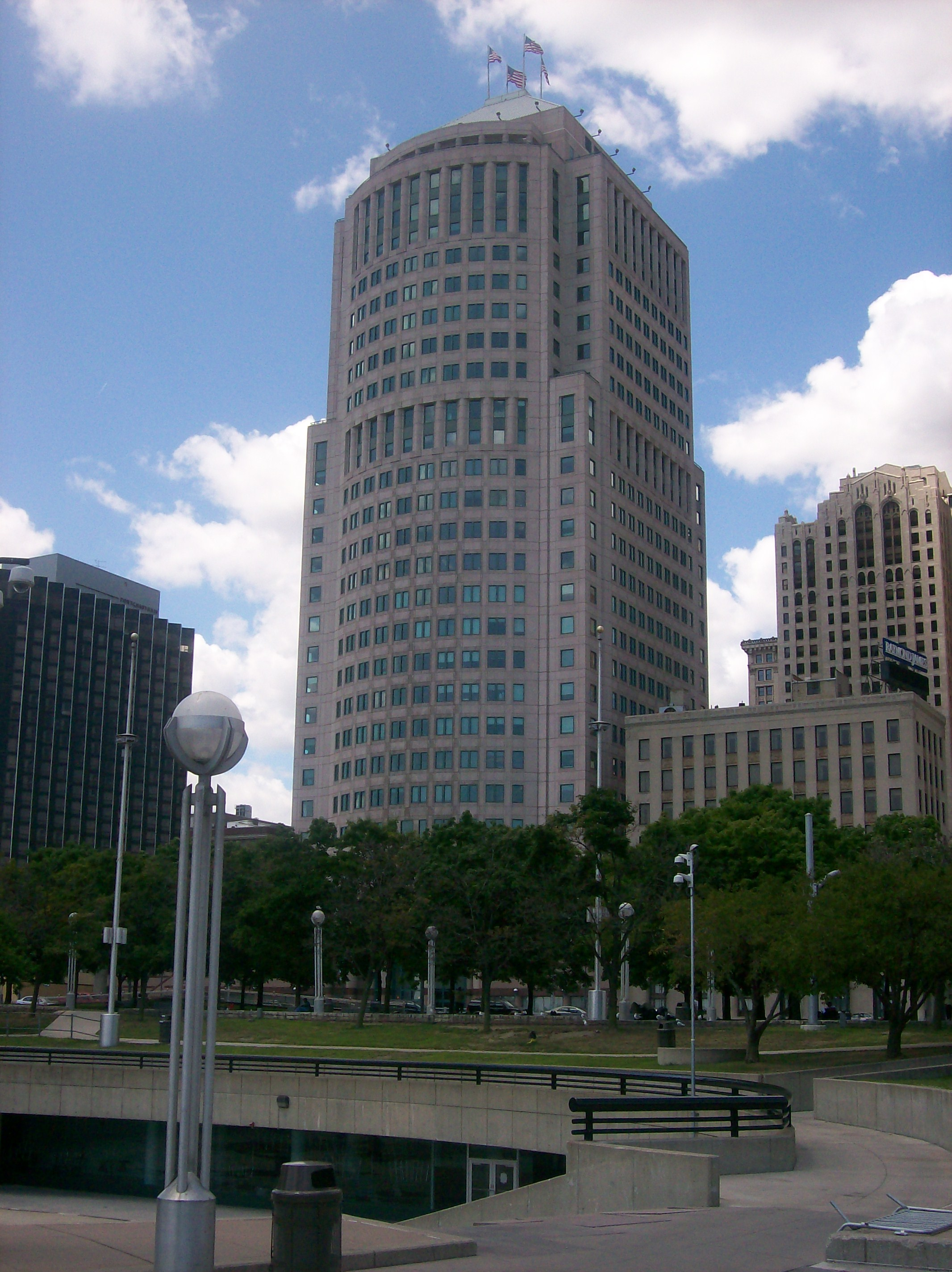
150 West Jefferson by Heller Manus Architects

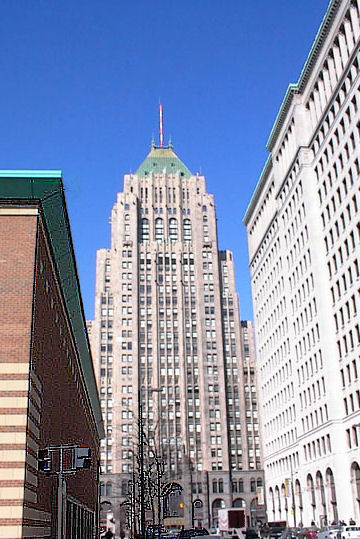
Fisher Building
by Albert Kahn

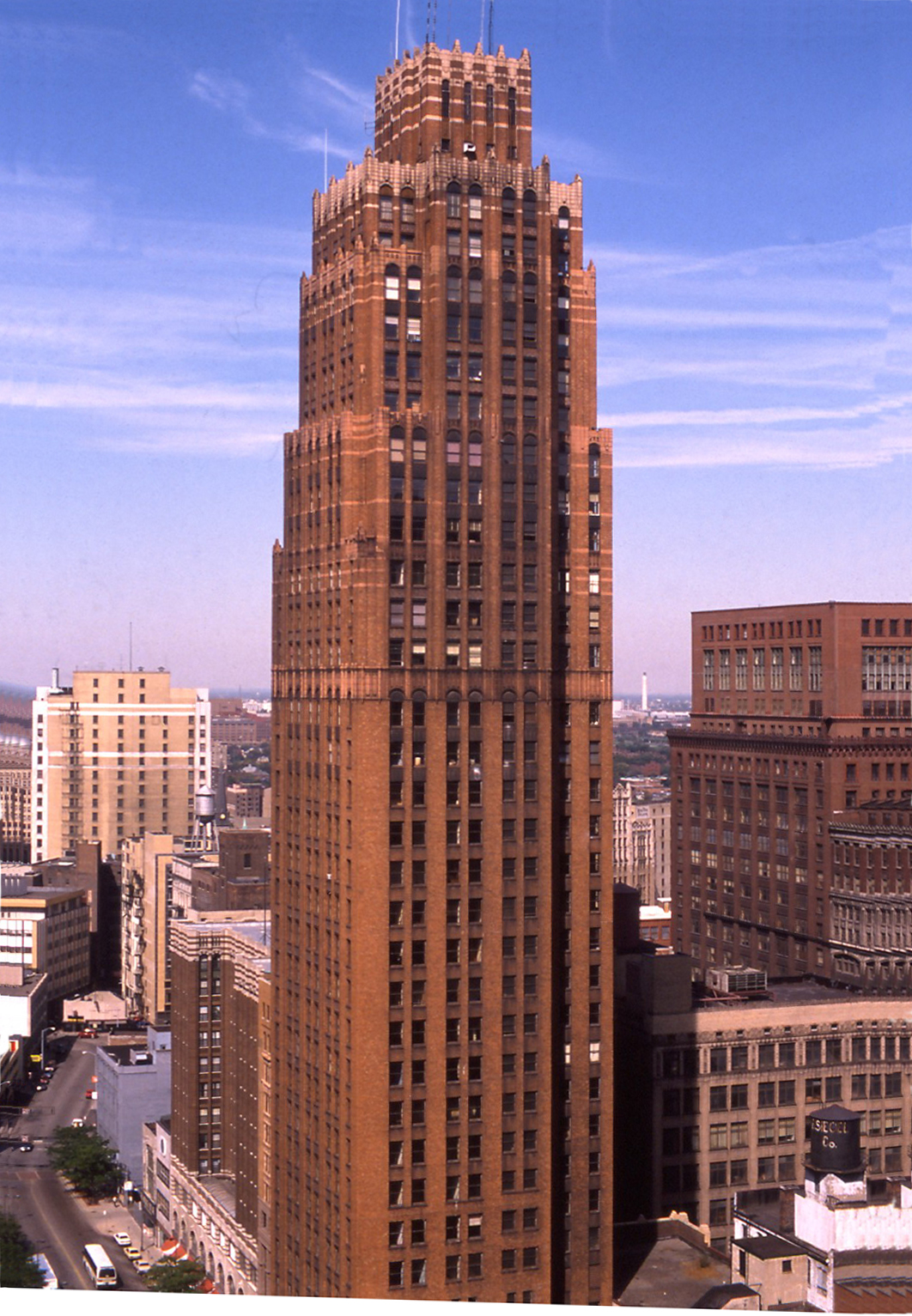
David Stott Building
by John M. Donaldson

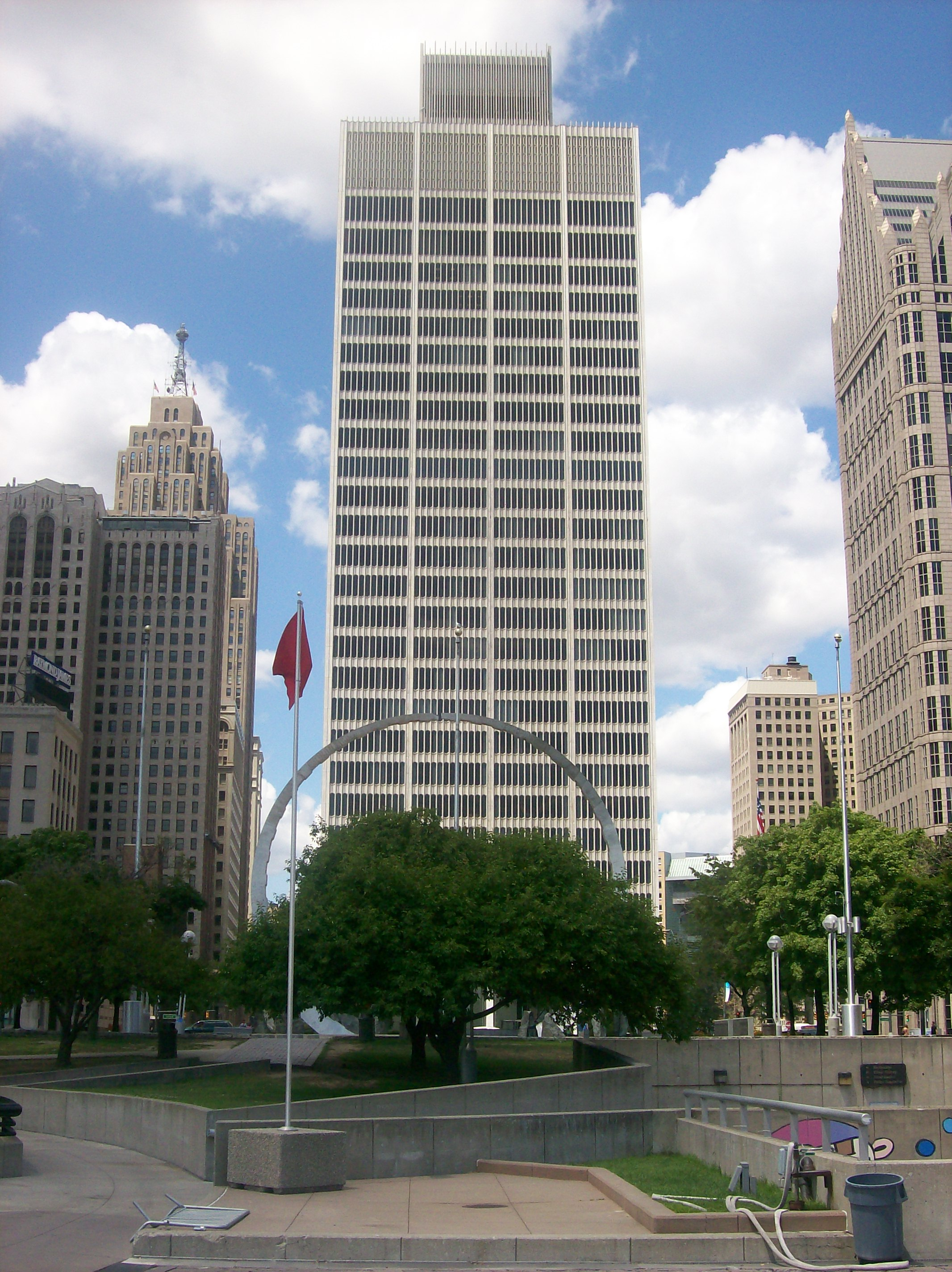
One Woodward Avenue by Minoru Yamasaki

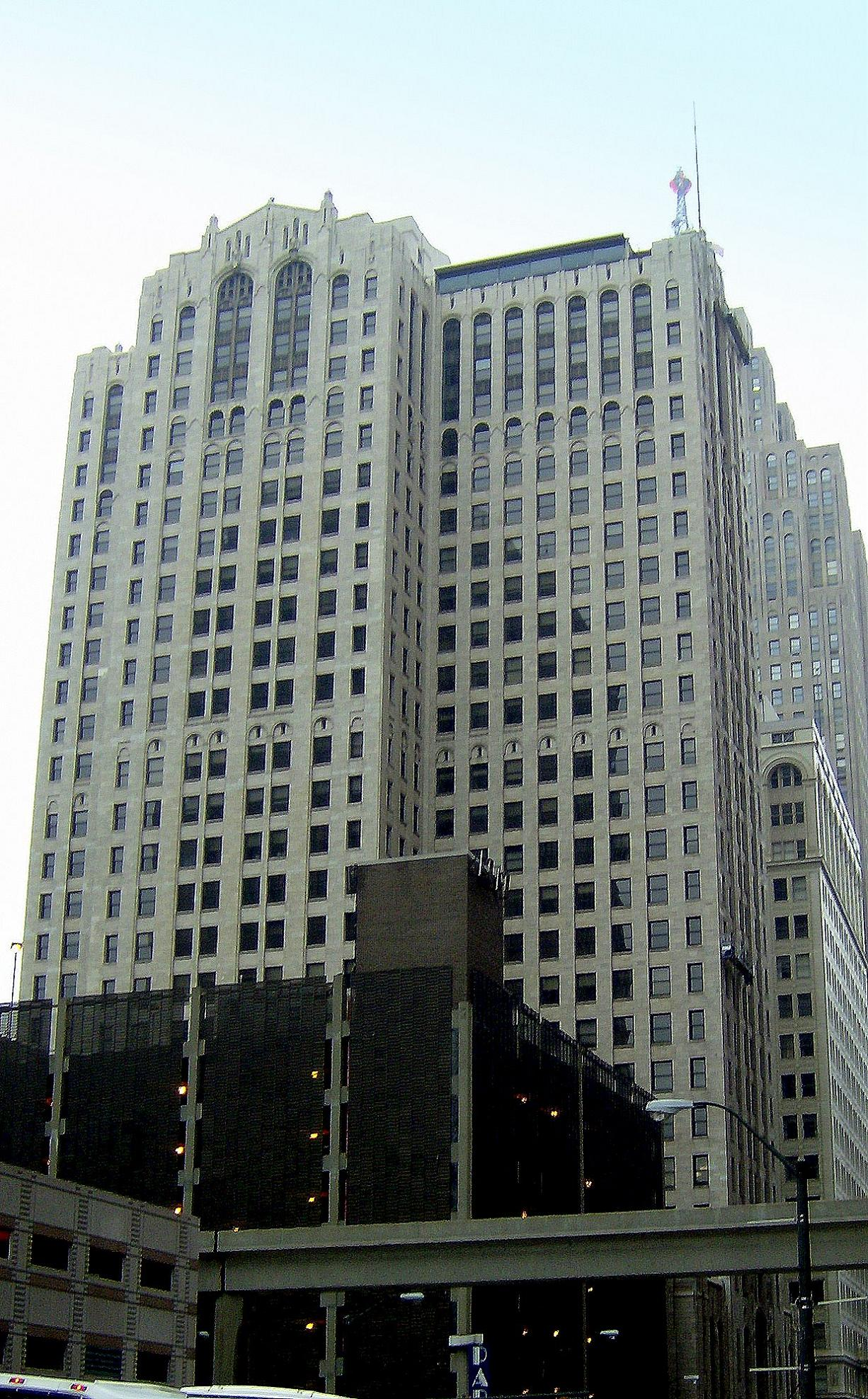
Buhl Building by Wirt Rowland

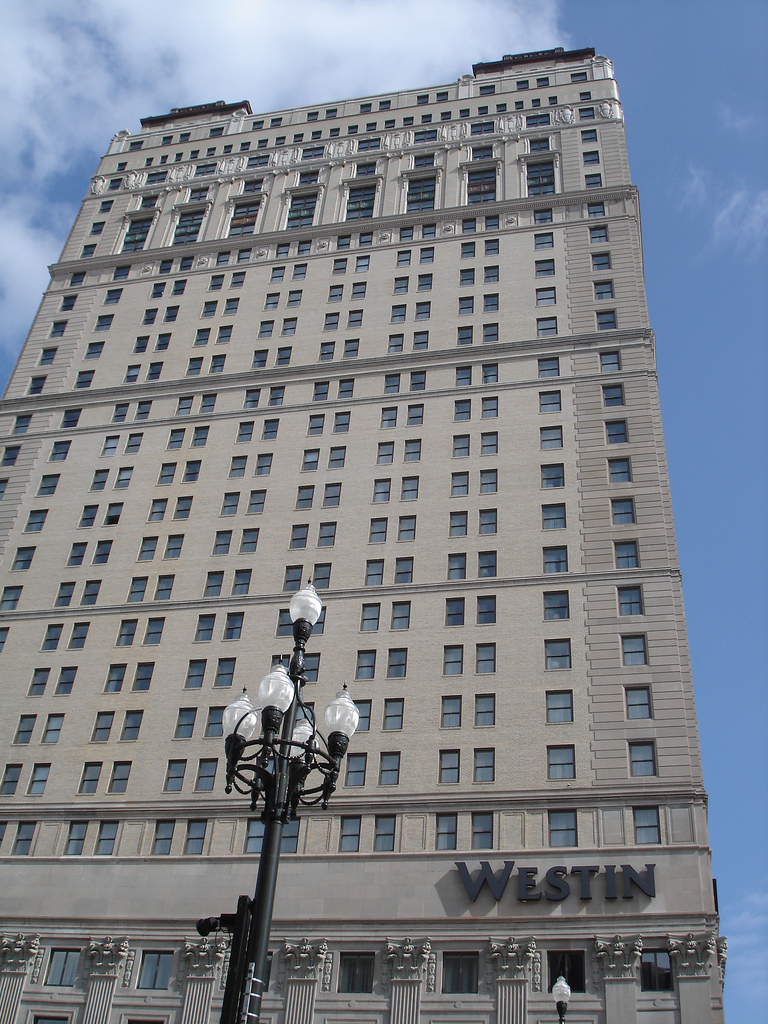
Westin Book Cadillac Hotel by Louis Kamper

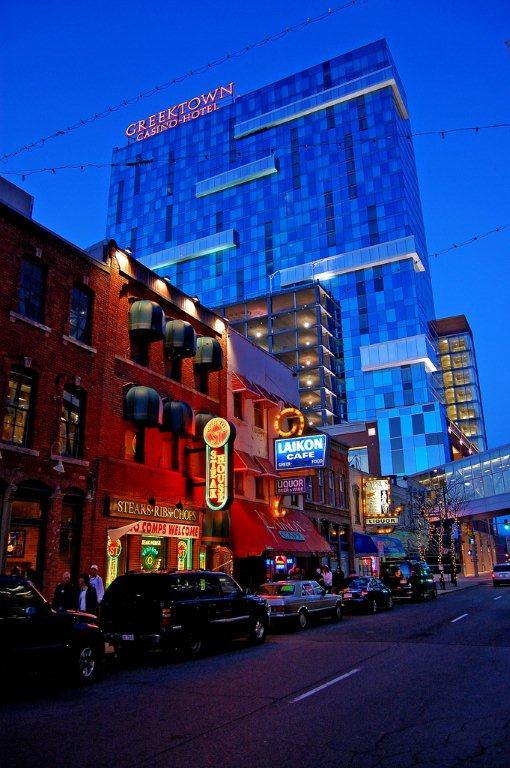
Greektown Casino Hotel by Rossetti

Landmarks
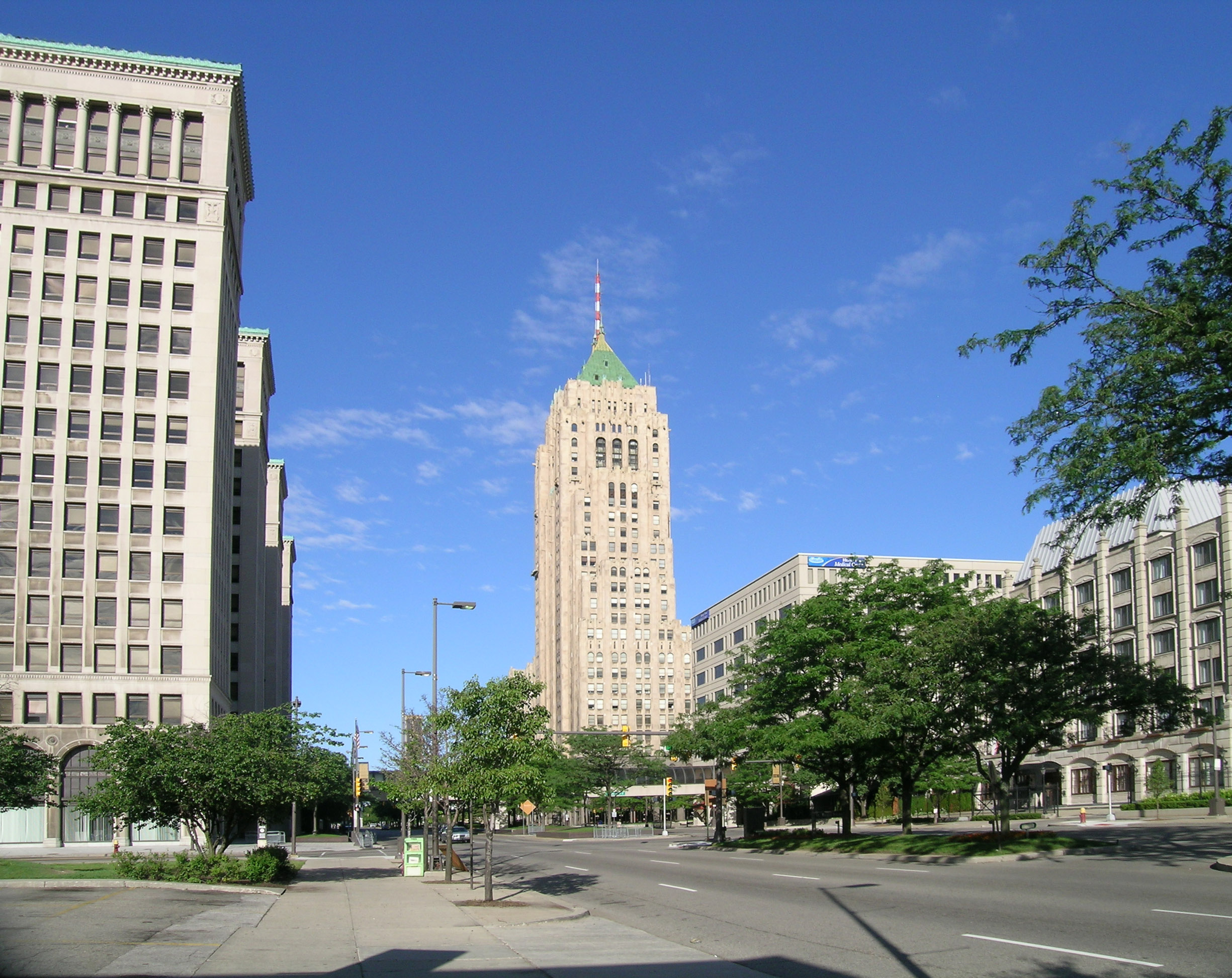
Cadillac Place (left) with the Fisher Building,
both by Albert Kahn

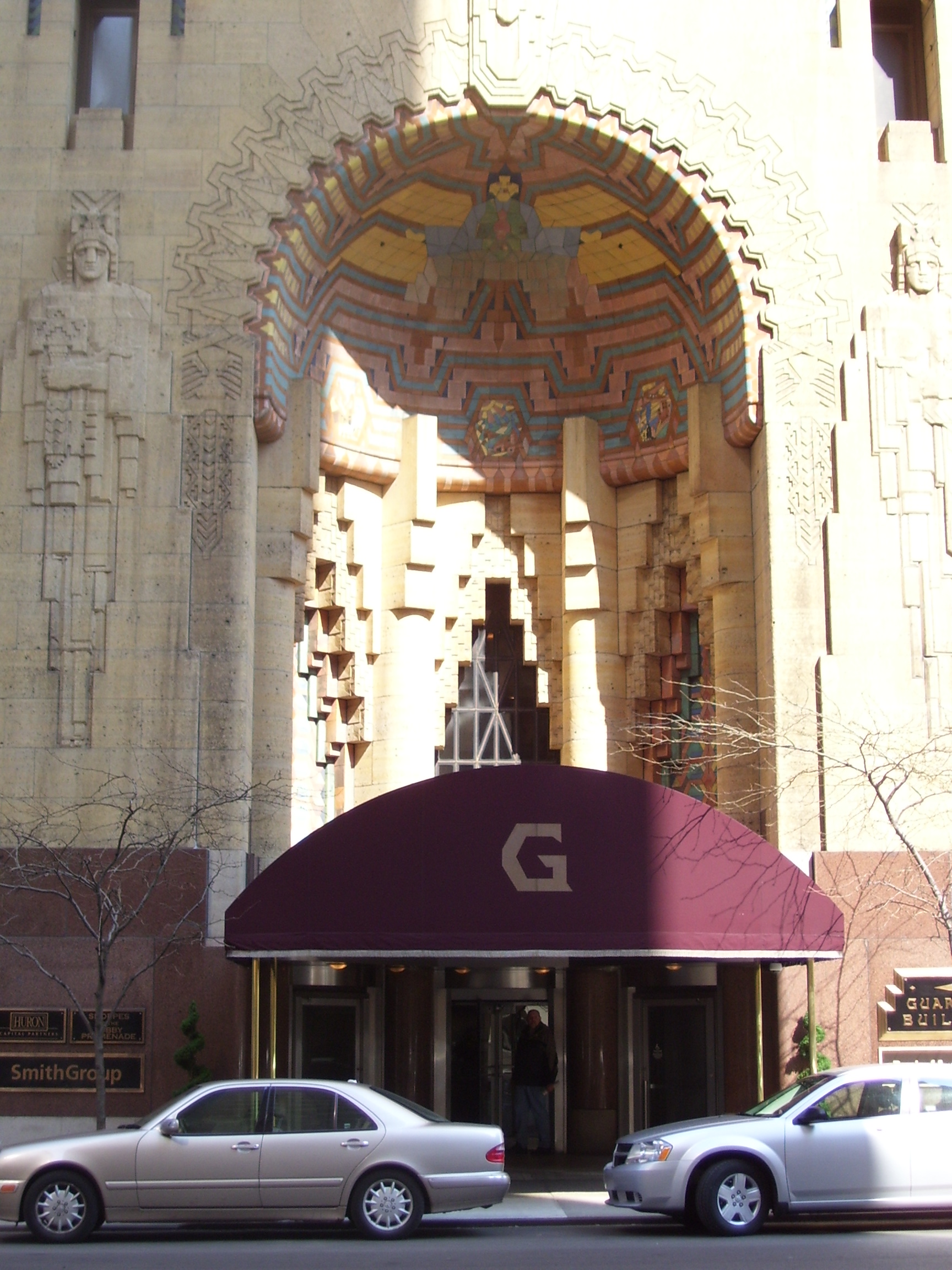
Guardian Building
by Wirt Rowland

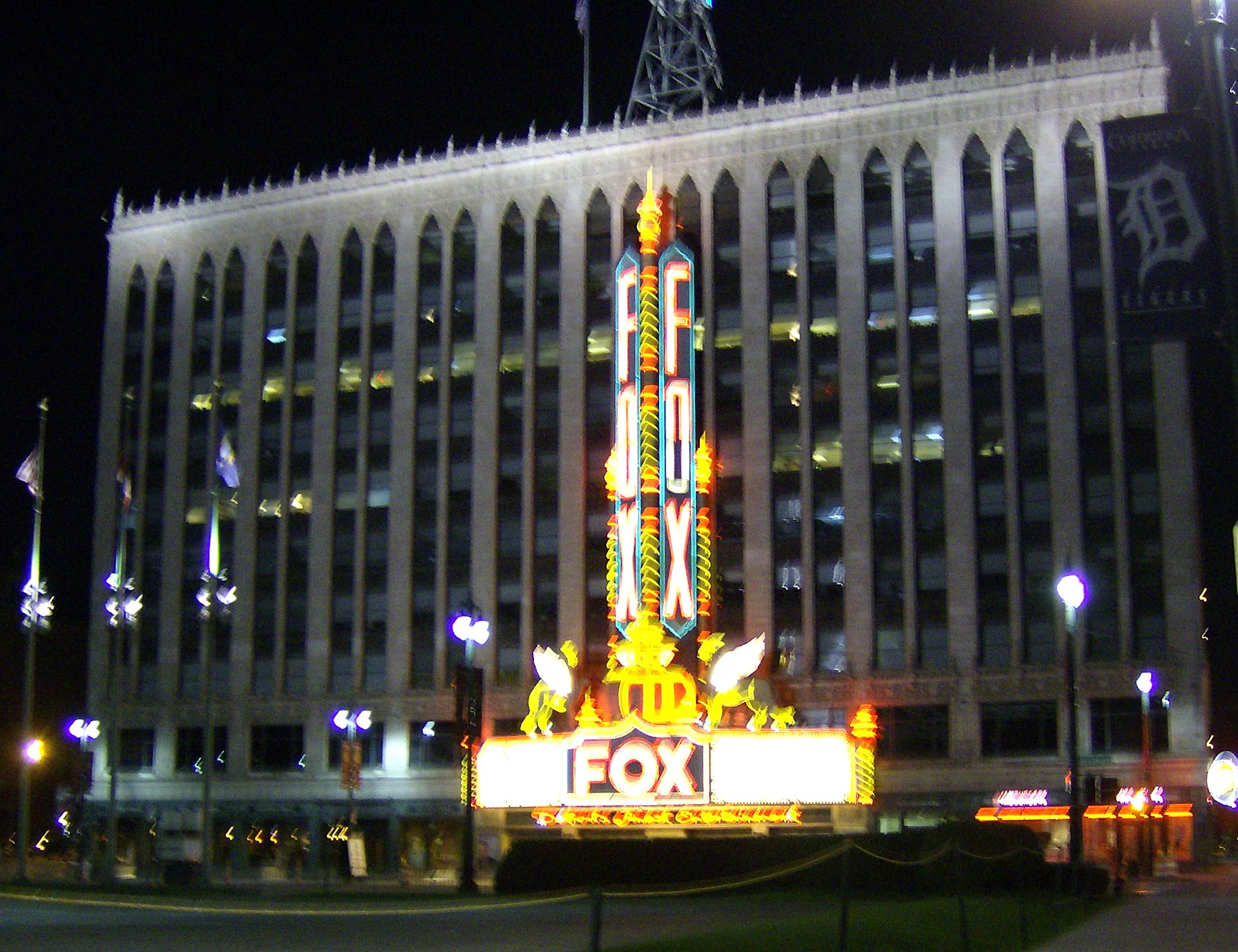
Fox Theatre by C. Howard Crane

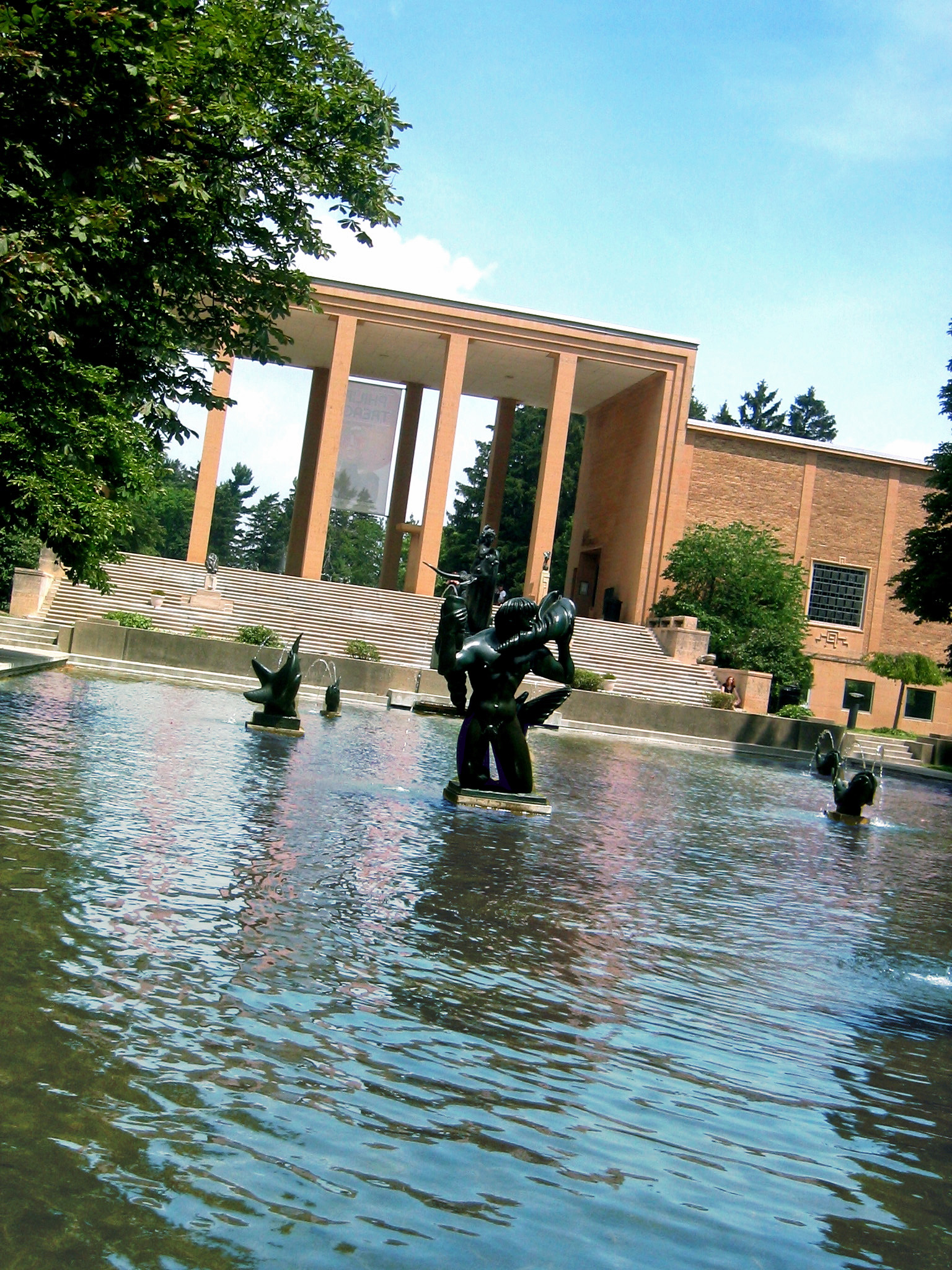
Cranbrook Educational Community in Bloomfield Hills

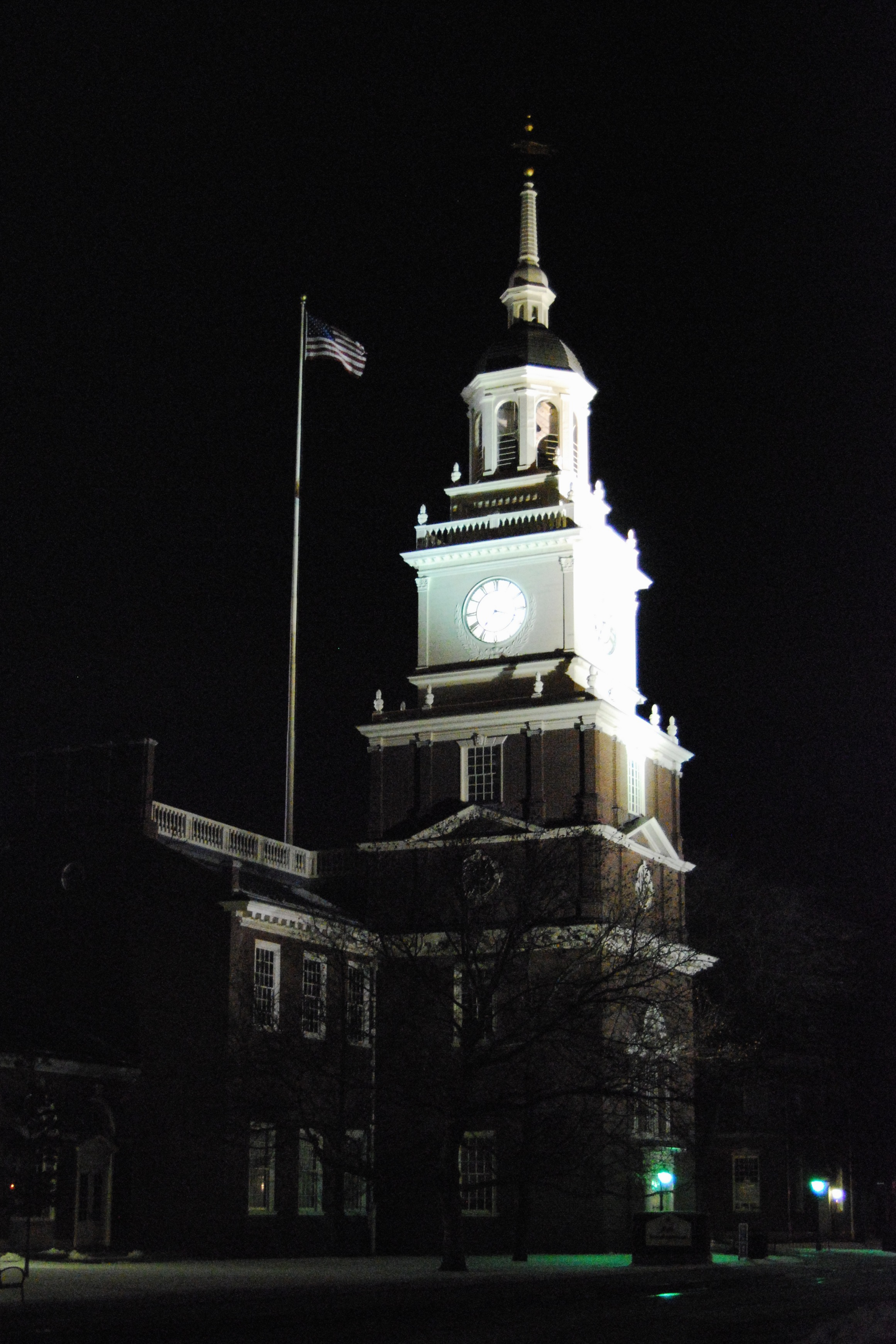
The Henry Ford in Dearborn

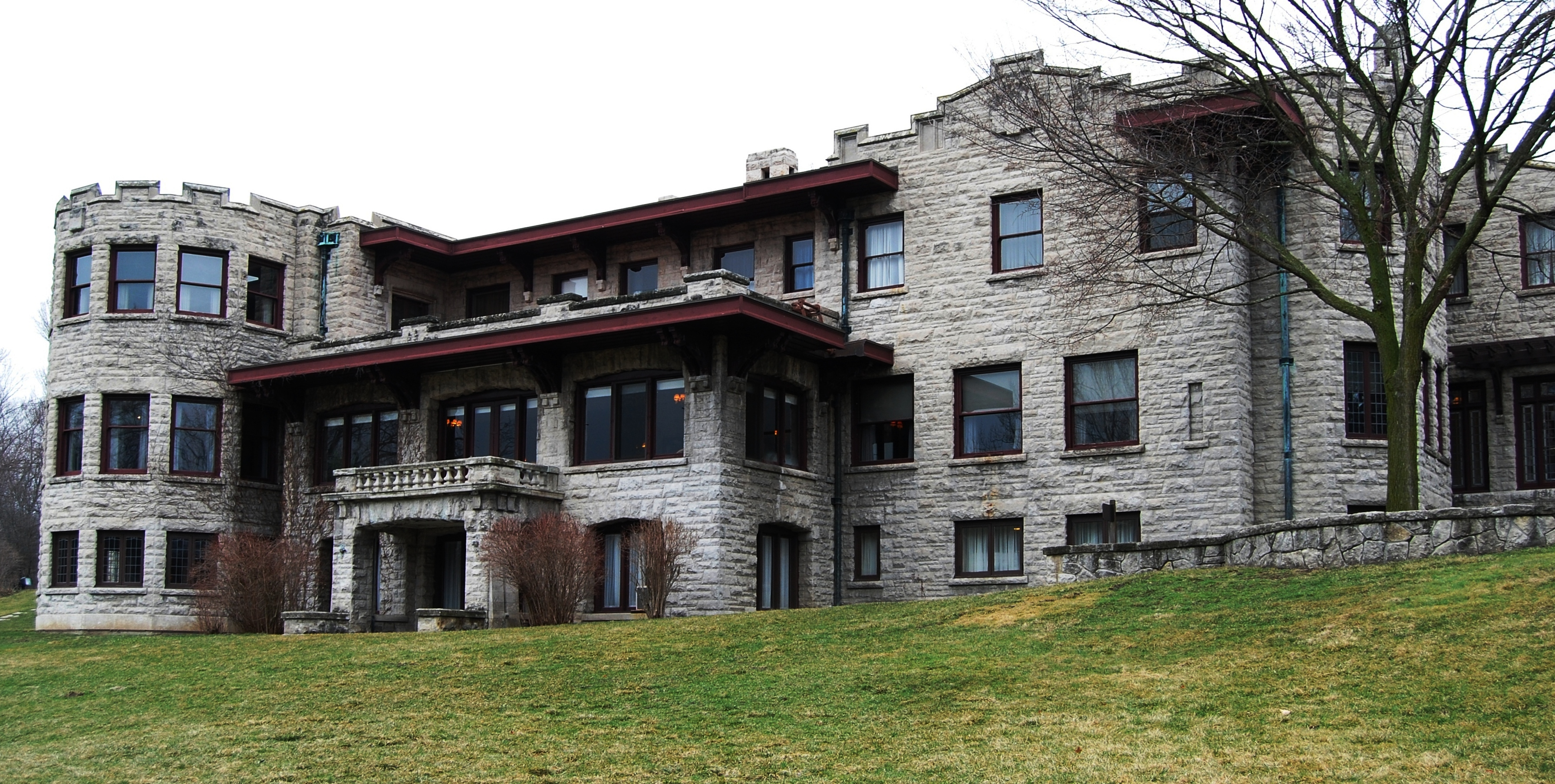
Henry Ford's Fair Lane estate in Dearborn

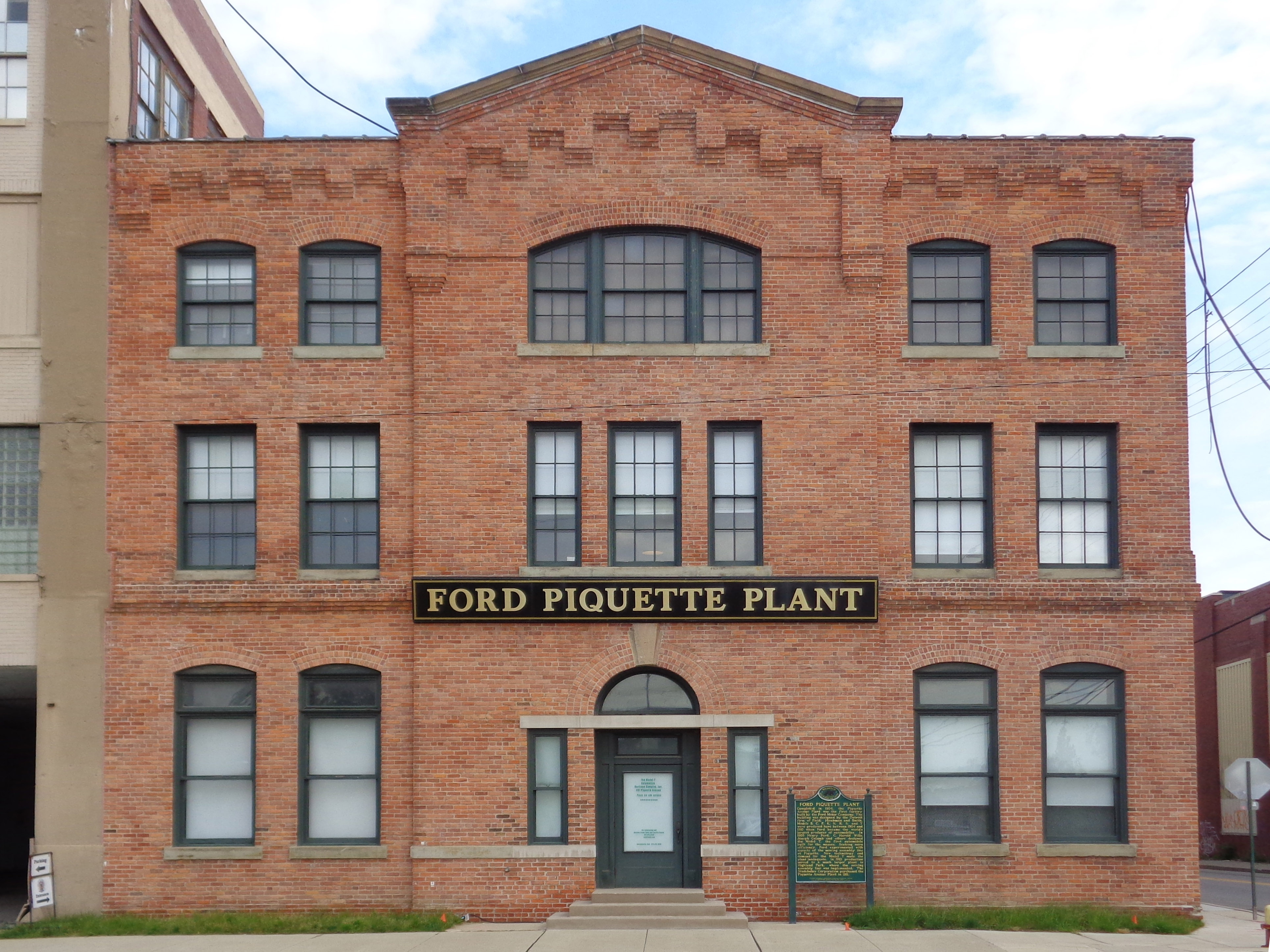
Ford Piquette Avenue Plant in Milwaukee Junction

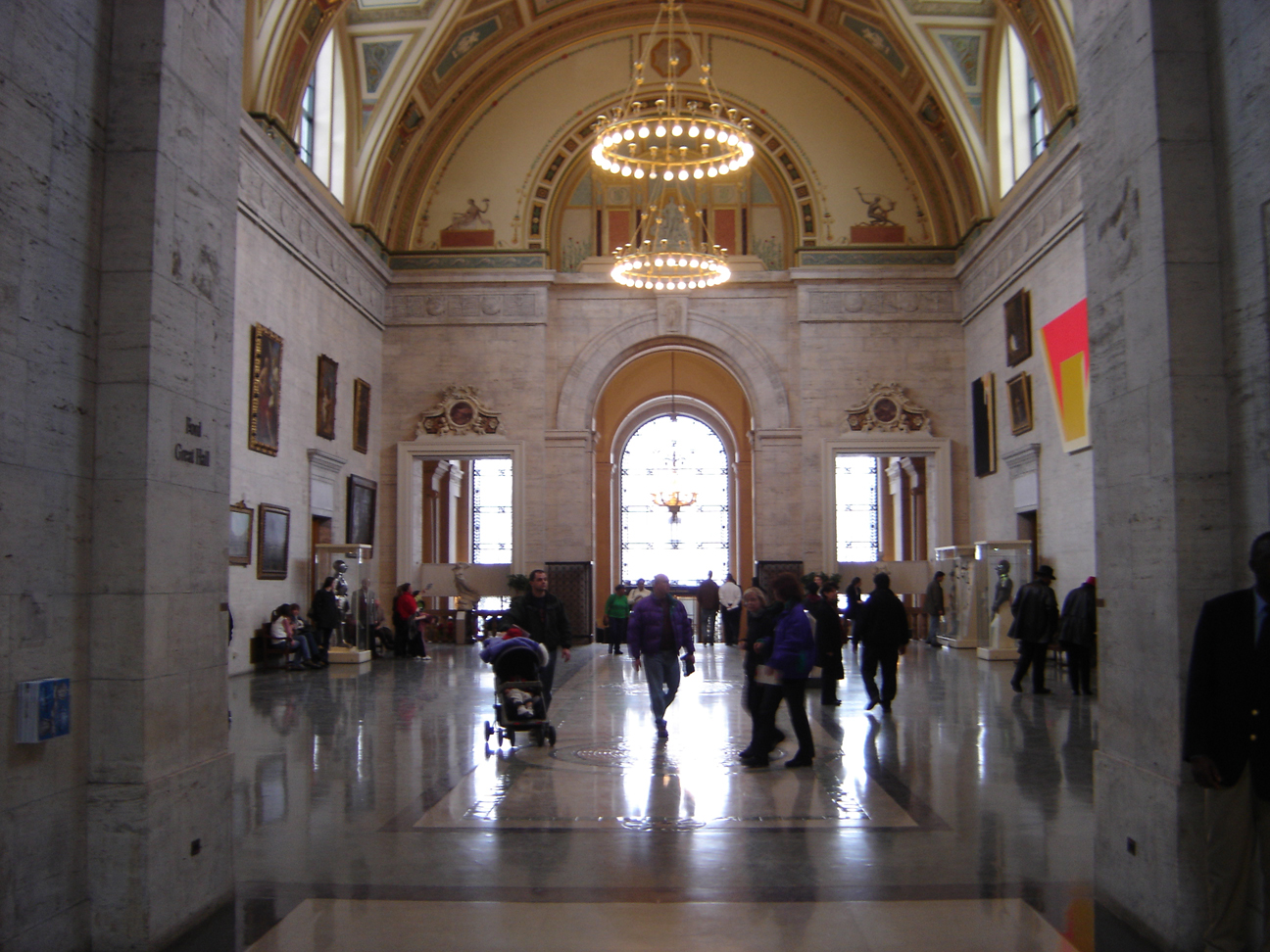
Detroit Institute of Arts
by Paul Cret

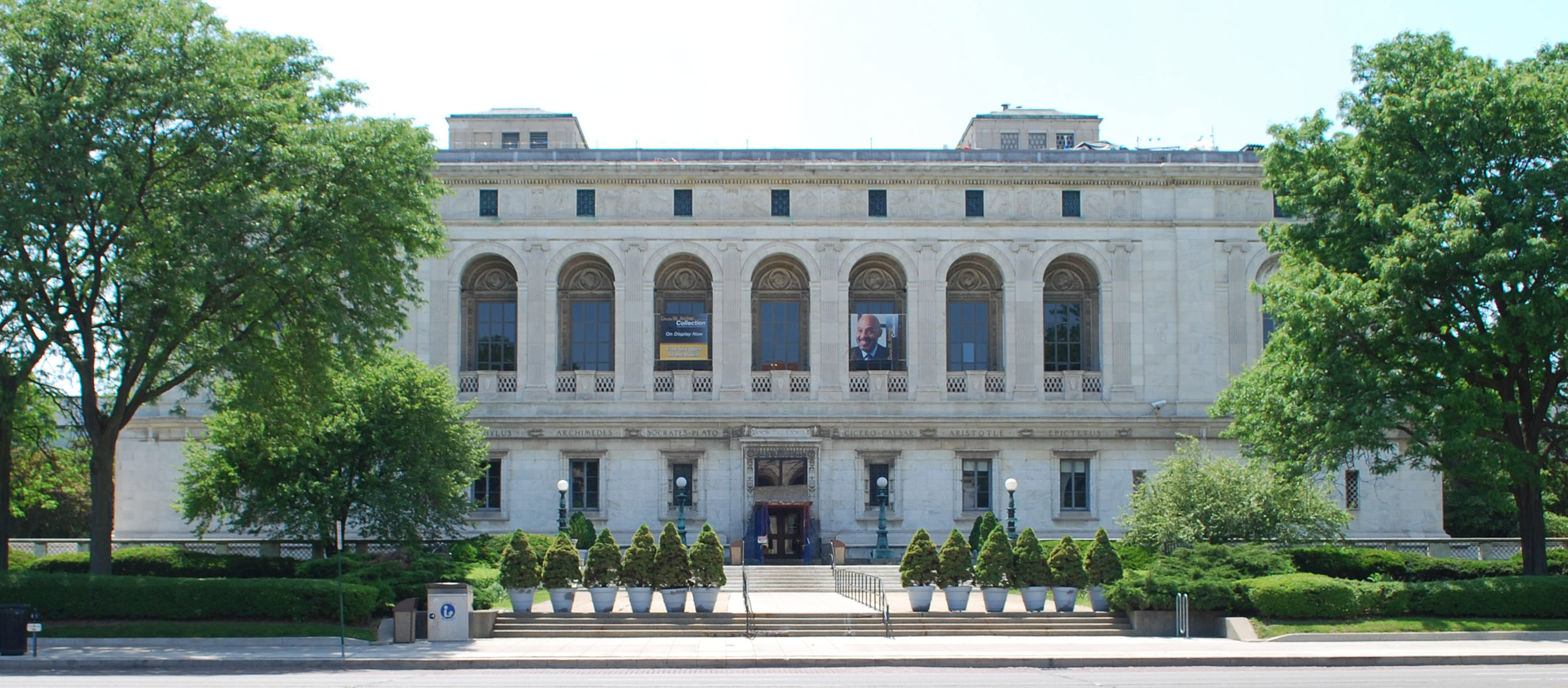
Detroit Public Library
by Cass Gilbert

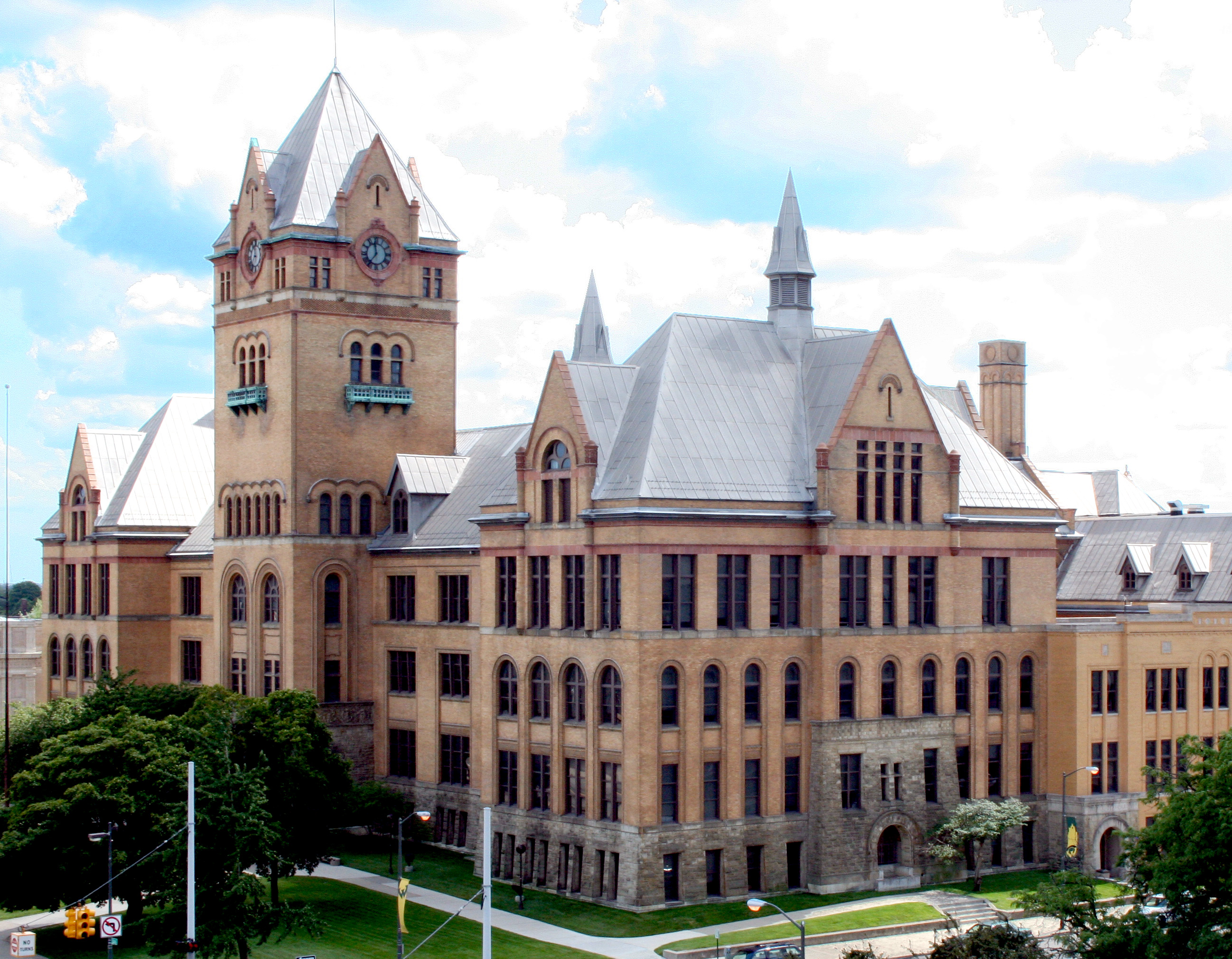
Old Main, a historic building at Wayne State University

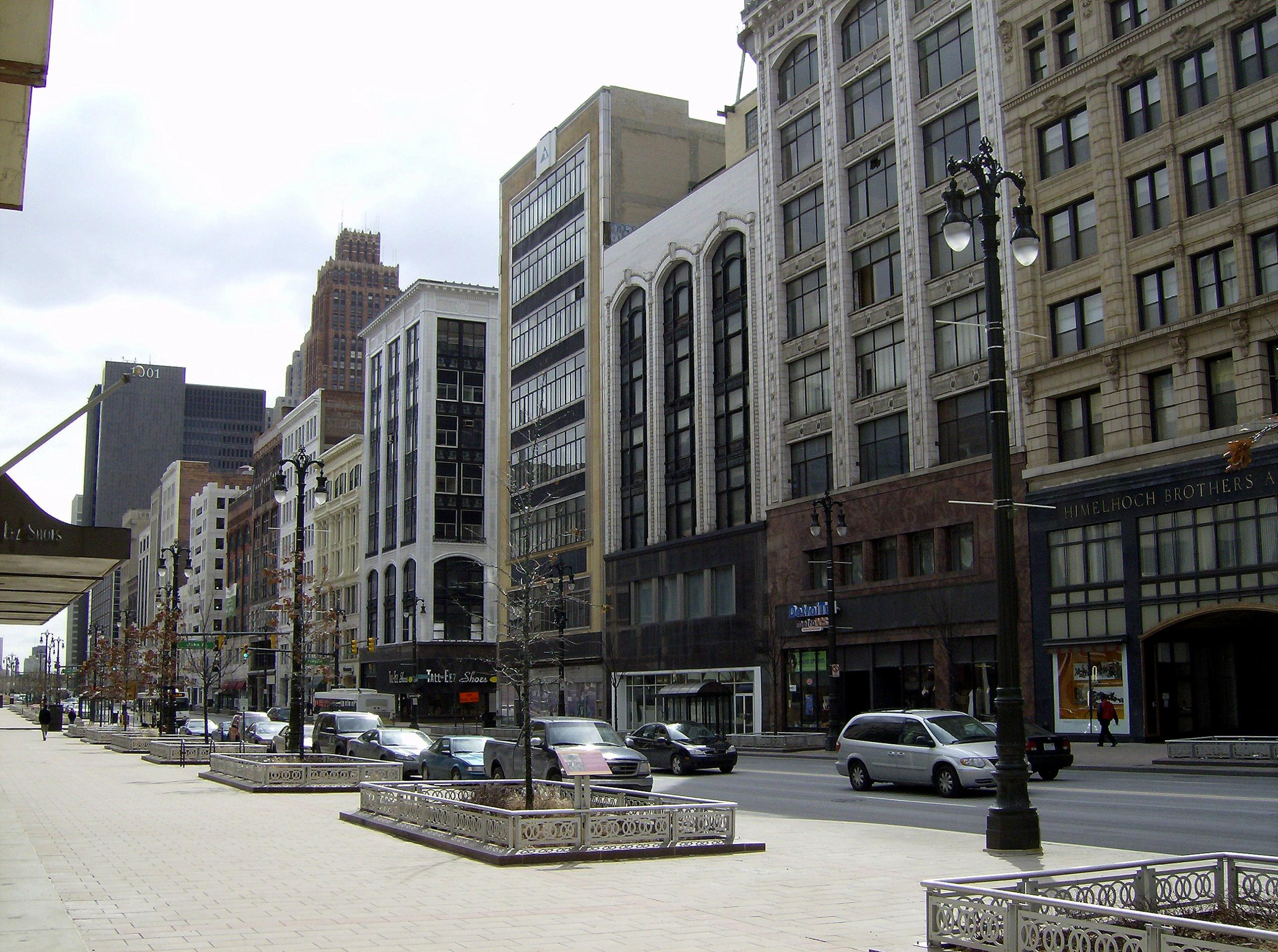
Historic Merchants Row on Woodward is a block north of the Compuware World Headquarters

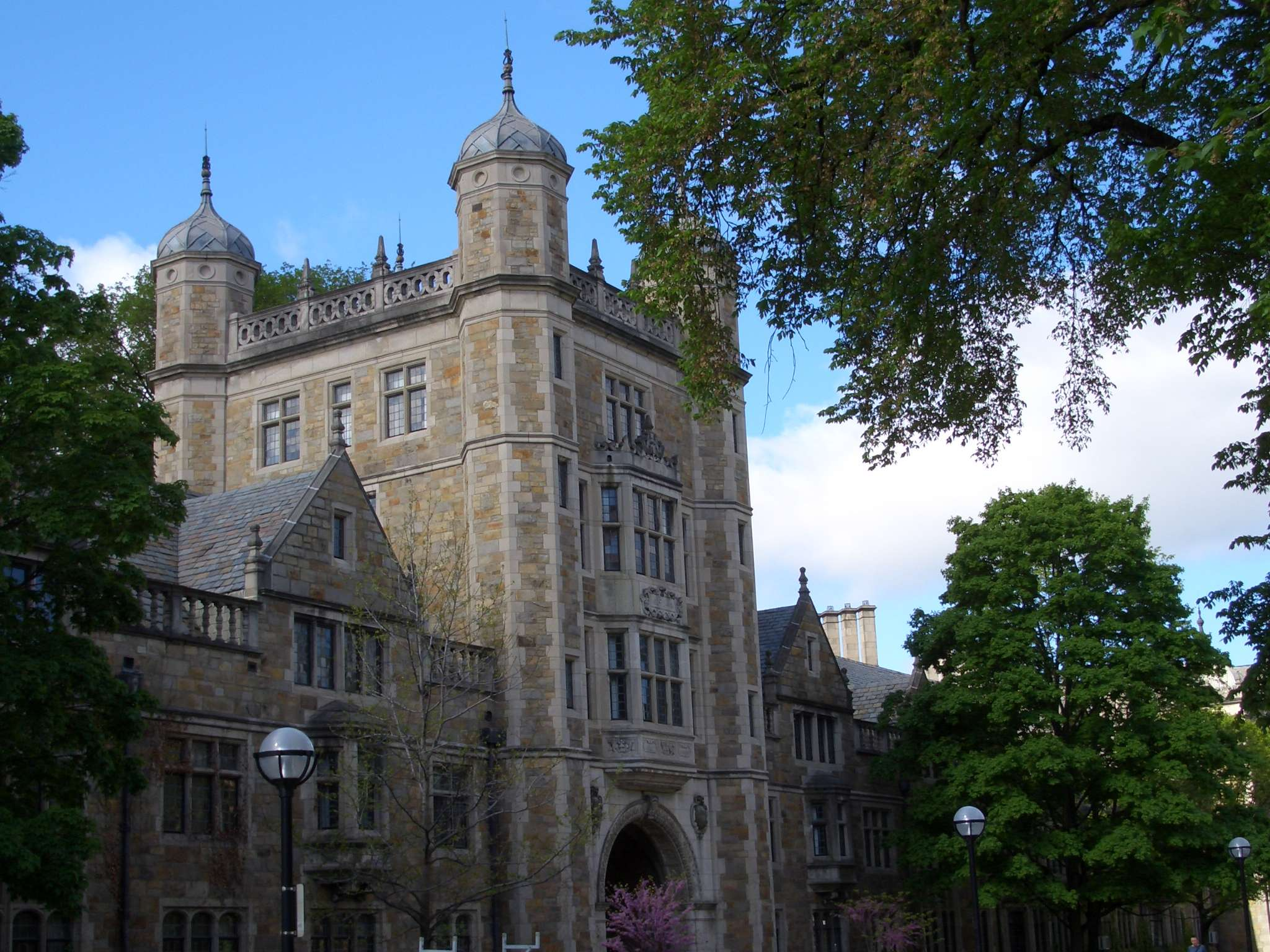
University of Michigan Law School: Lawyers Club (1924) by York and Sawyer — Quadrangle (1933) by Gunnar Birkerts — Library addition (1982) by Quinn Evans

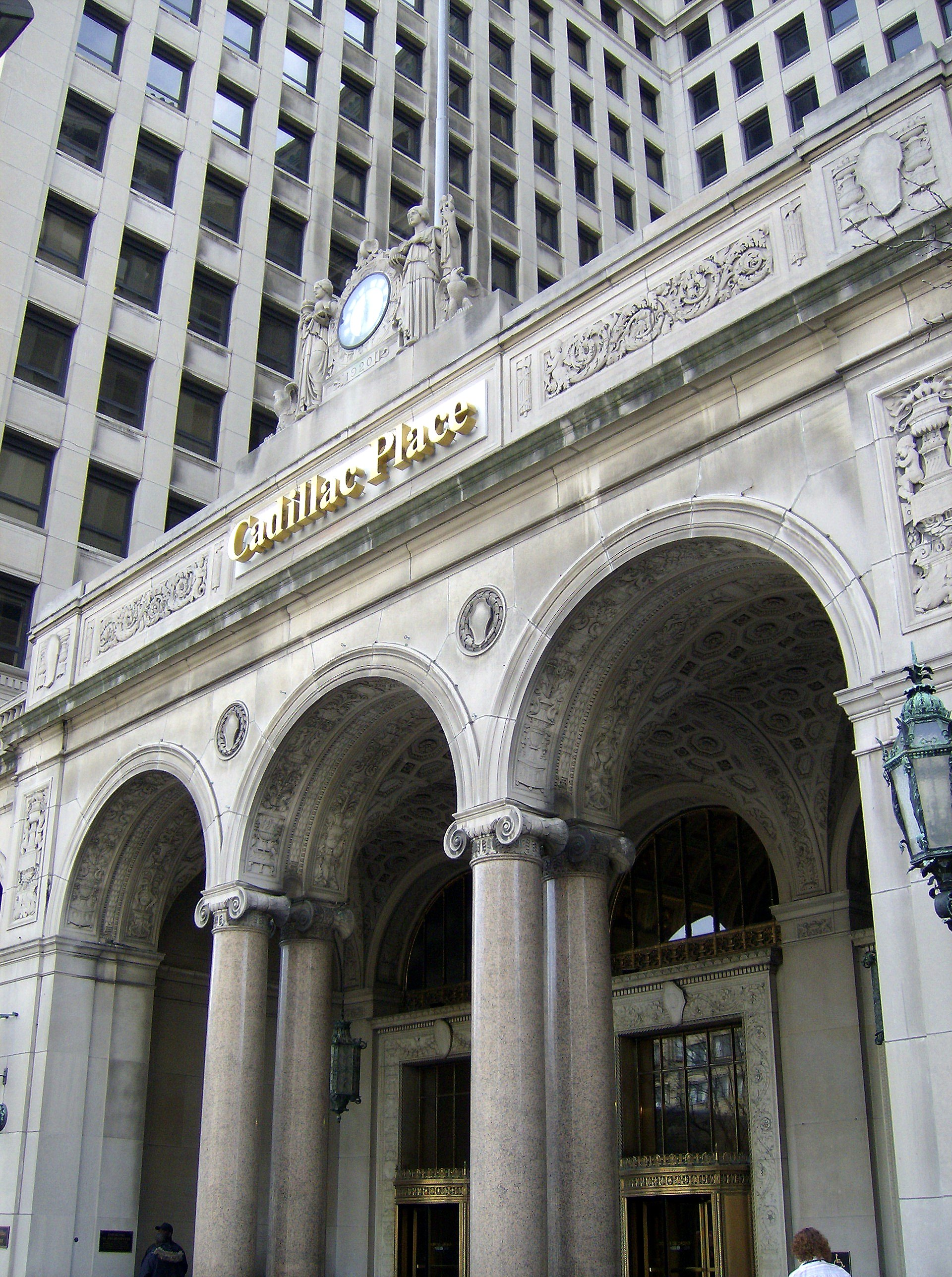
Cadillac Place, a National Historic Landmark in Detroit's New Center by Albert Kahn

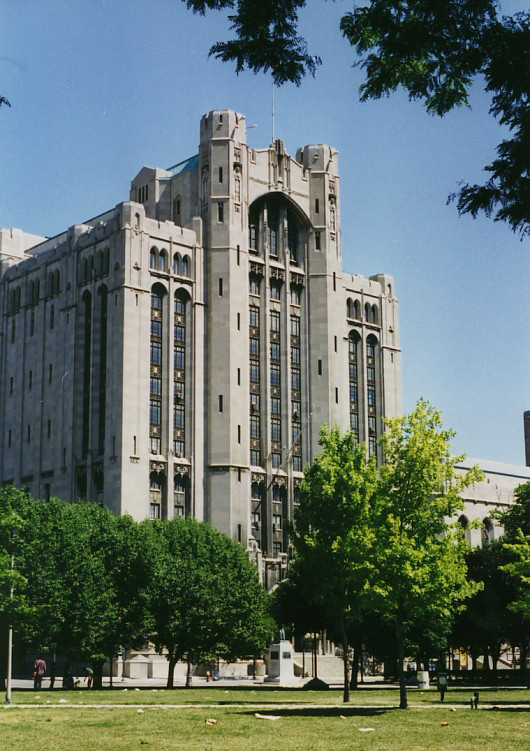
Detroit Masonic Temple, the world's largest Masonic Temple, by George D. Mason

Monuments
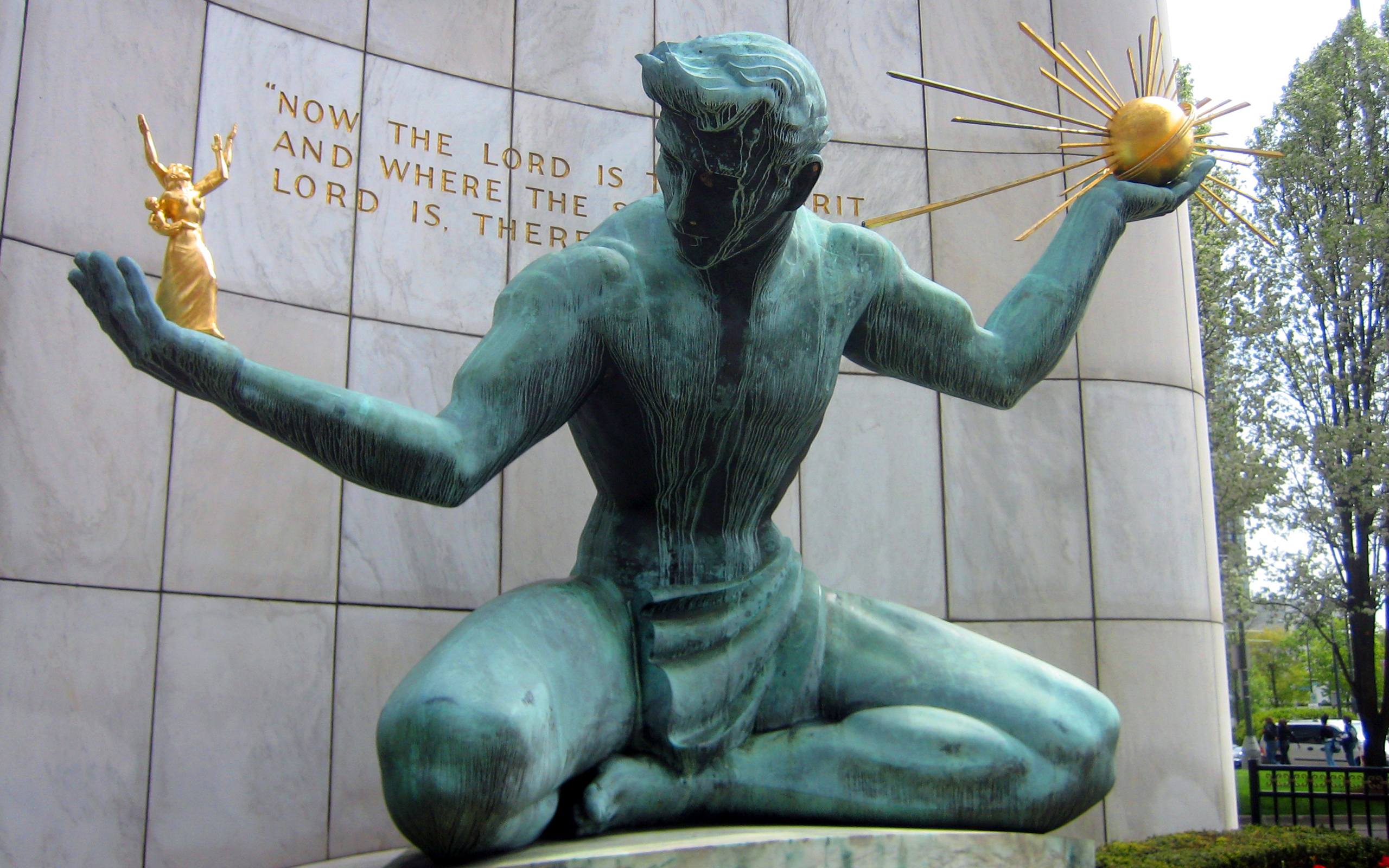
The "Spirit of Detroit"
by Marshall Fredericks

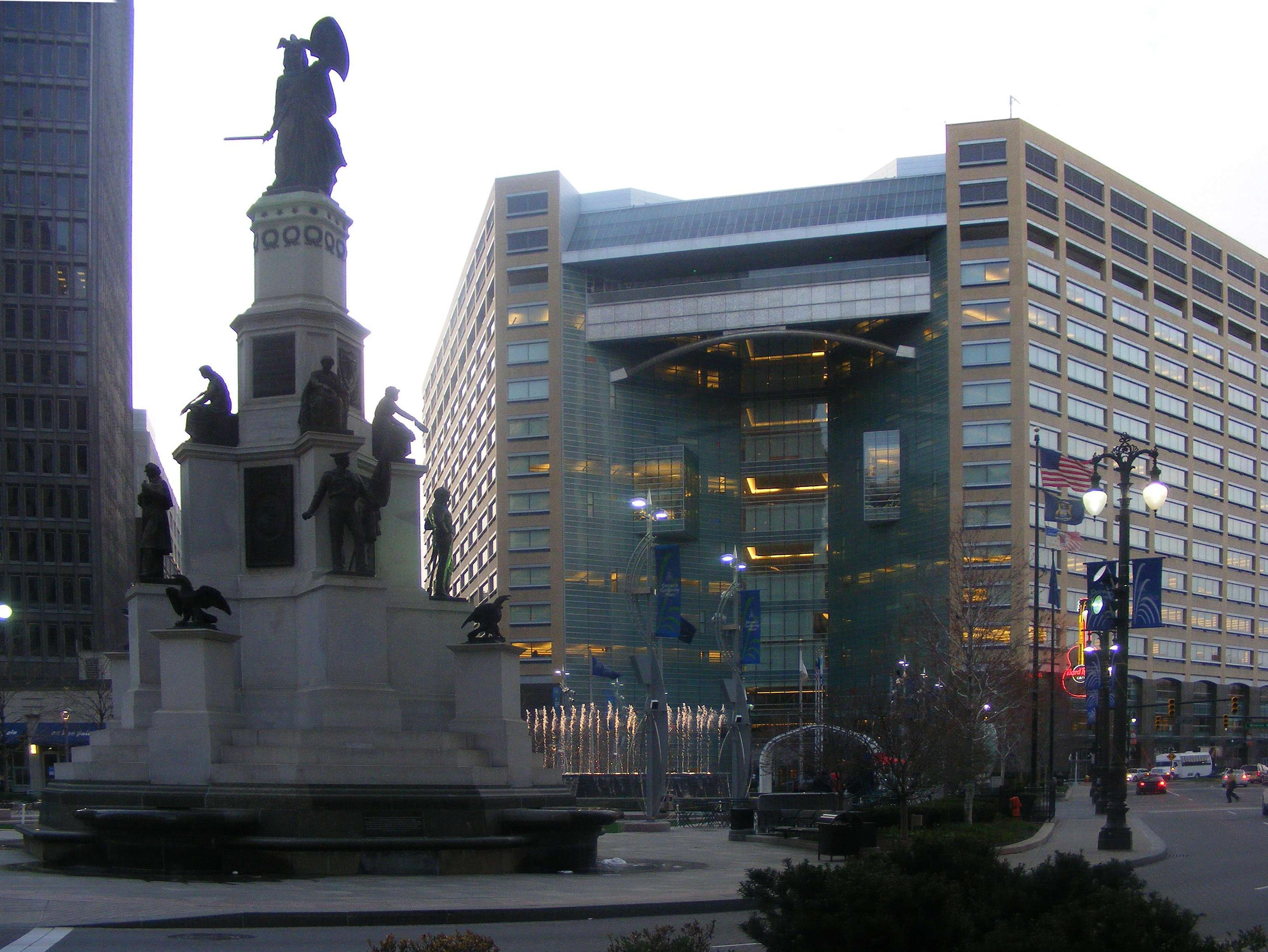
Michigan Soldiers' and Sailors' Monument (1872) by Randolph Rogers and Woodward Fountain on Campus Martius Park

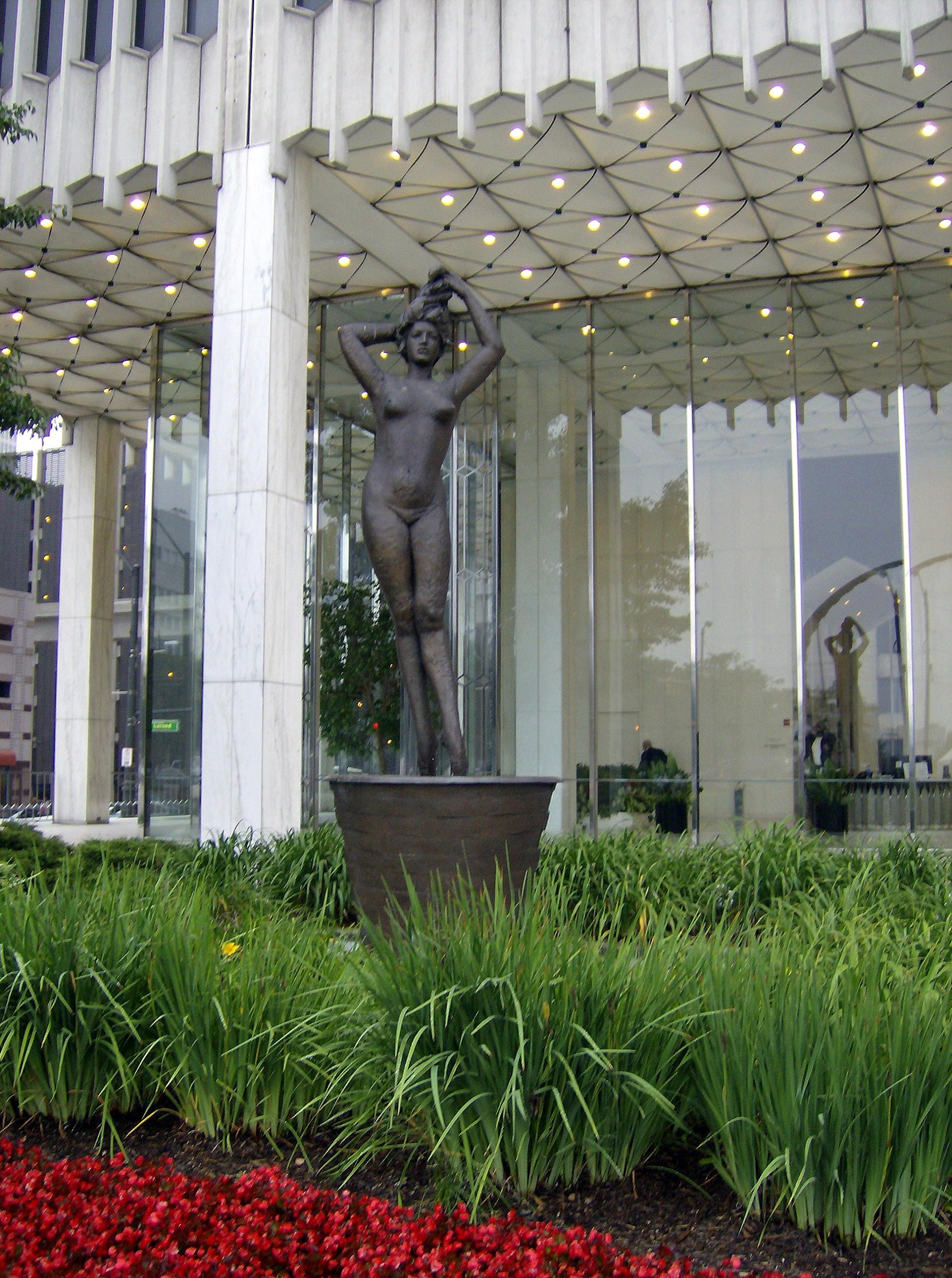
Passo di Danza by Giacomo Manzù at One Woodward Avenue

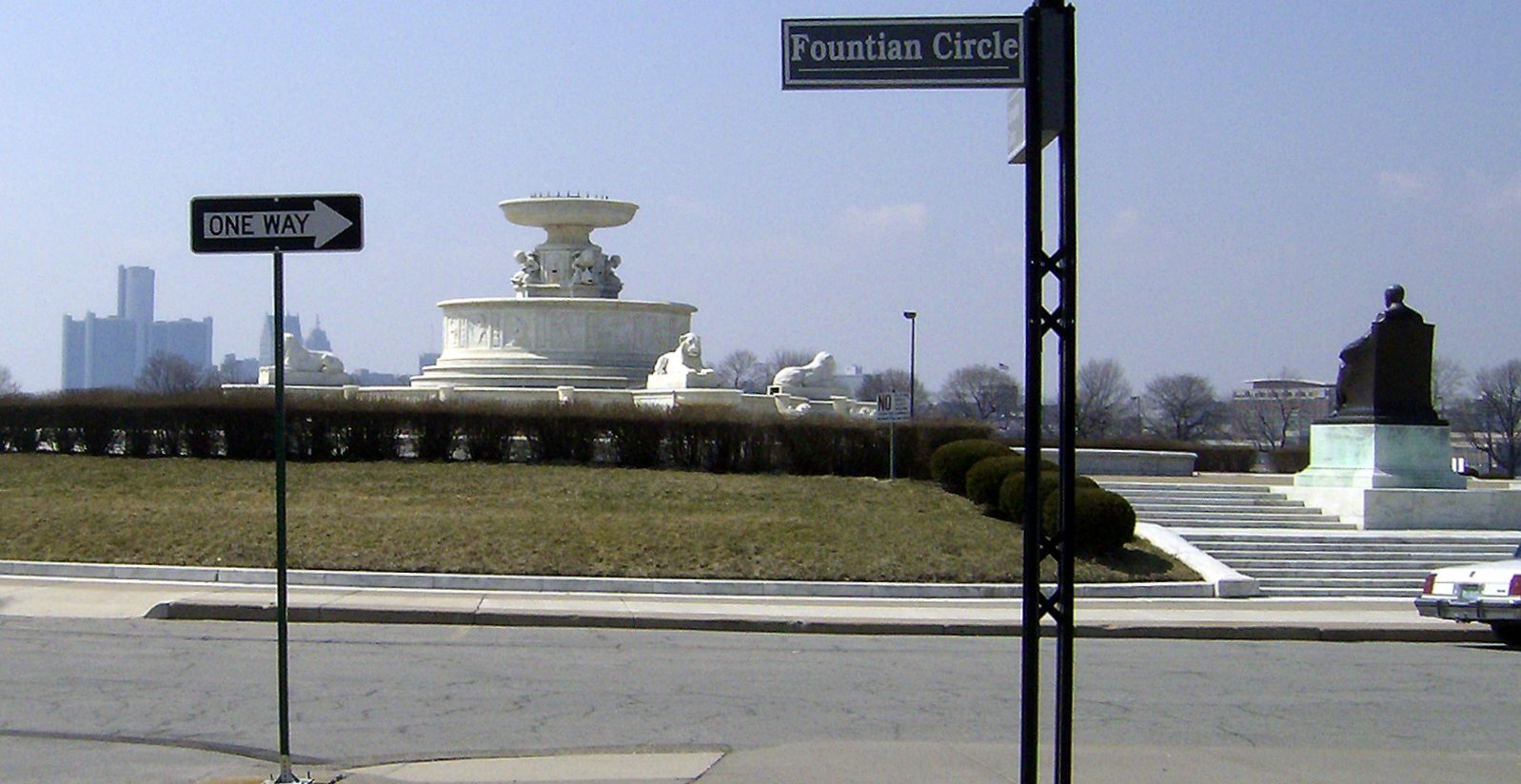
The massive James Scott Memorial Fountain by Cass Gilbert on Detroit's Belle Isle

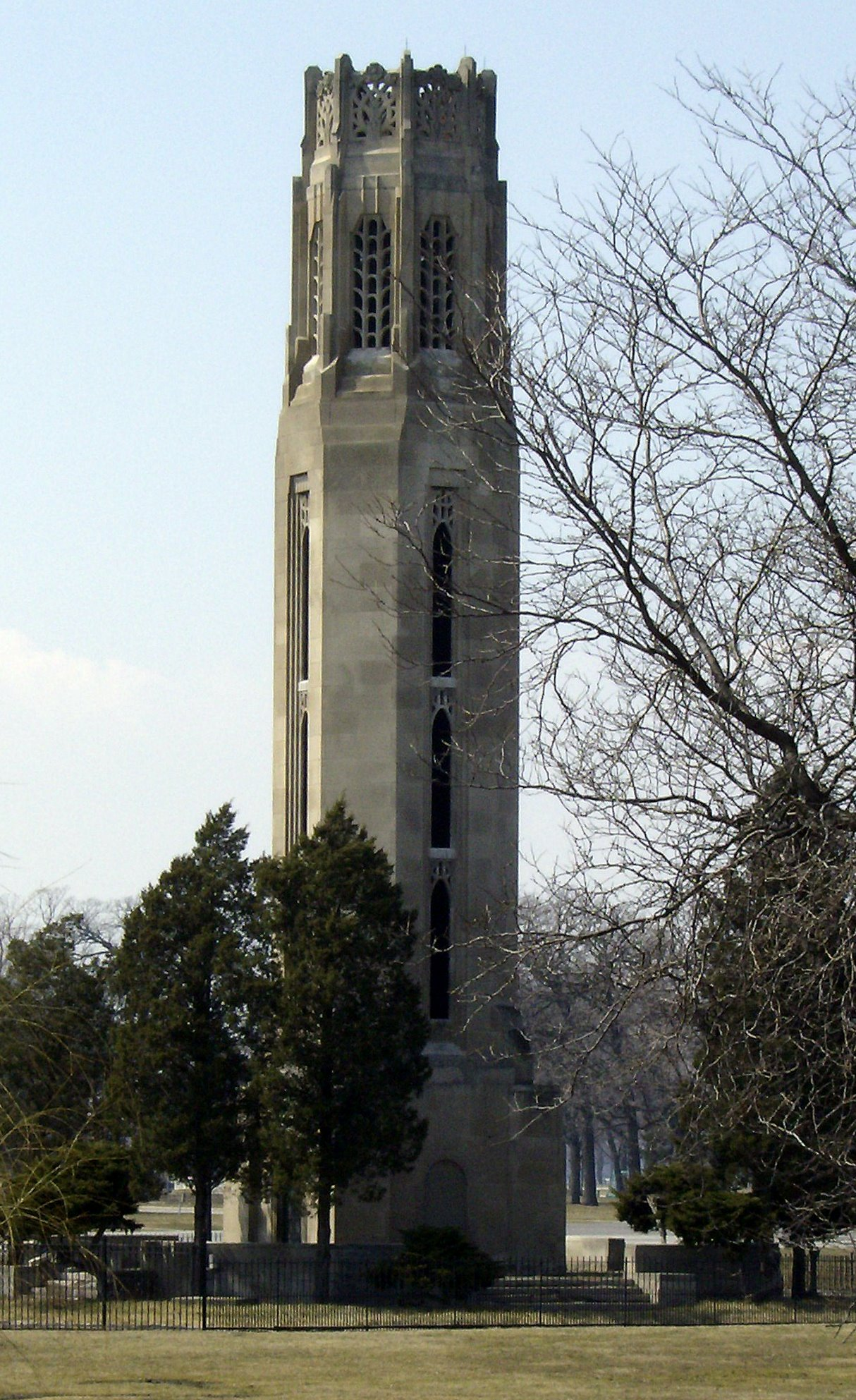
Belle Isle Carillion.

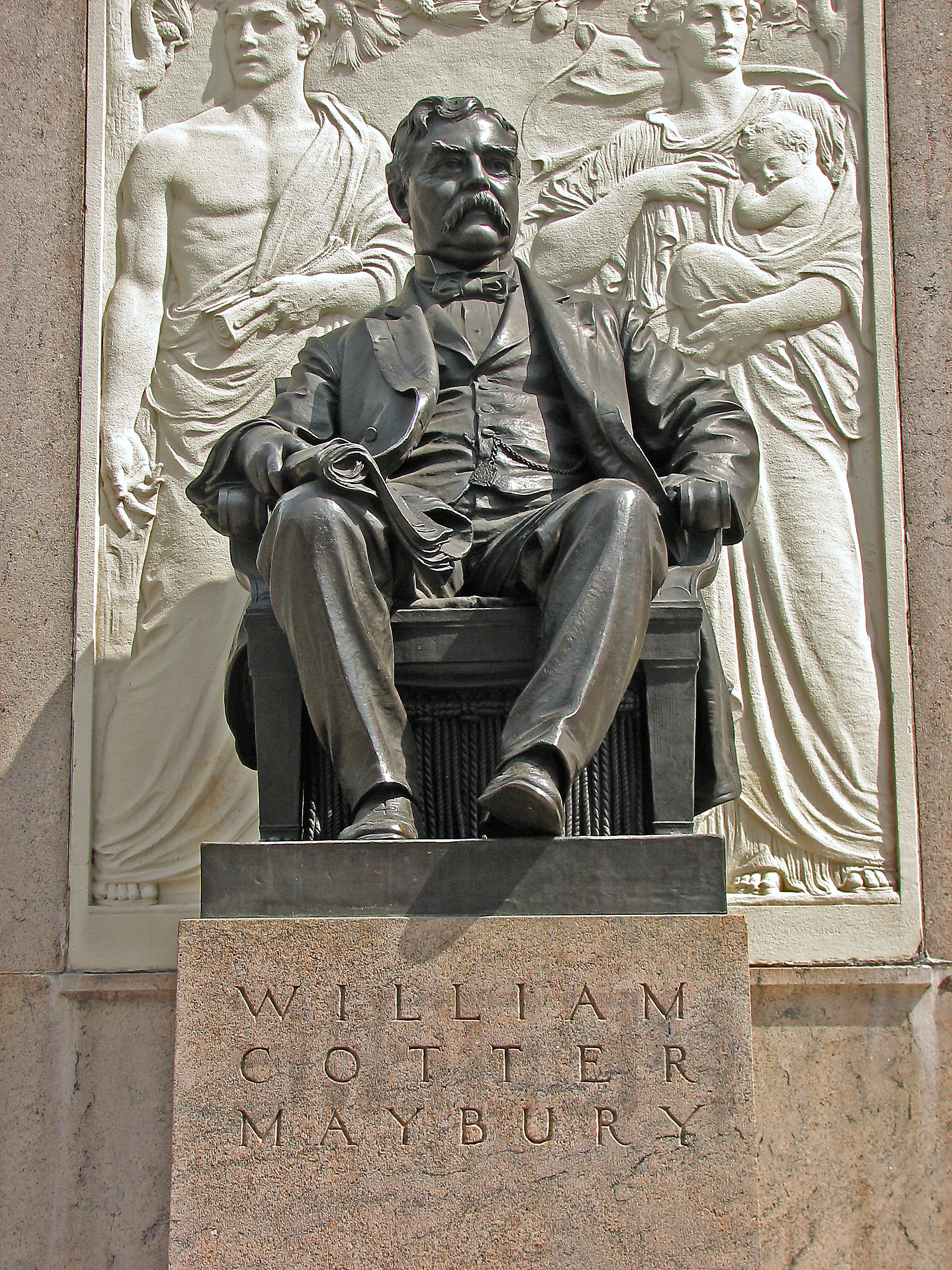
William C. Maybury Monument by Adolph Alexander Weinman in Grand Circus Park

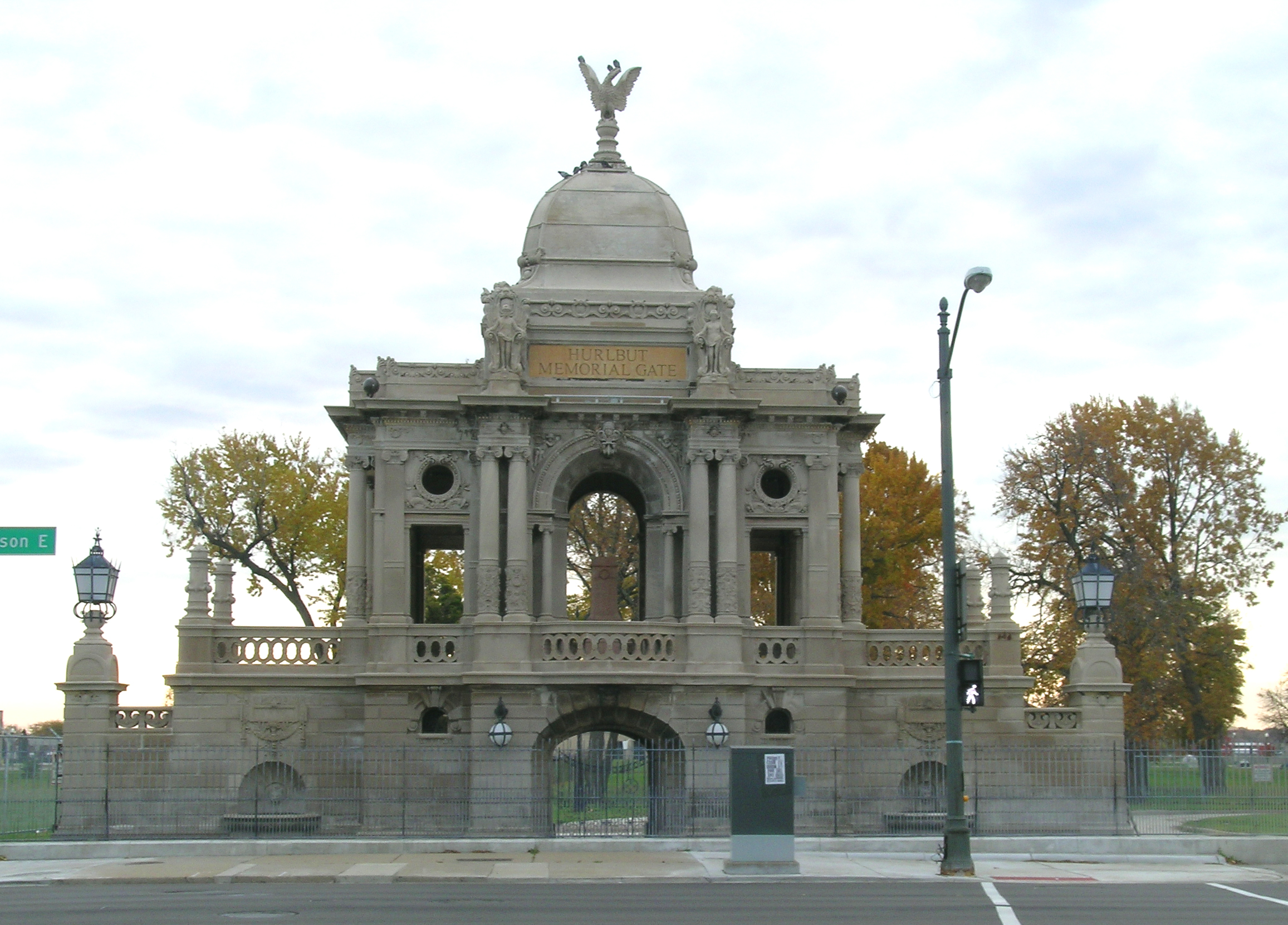
Chauncey Hurlbut Memorial Gate at Waterworks Park

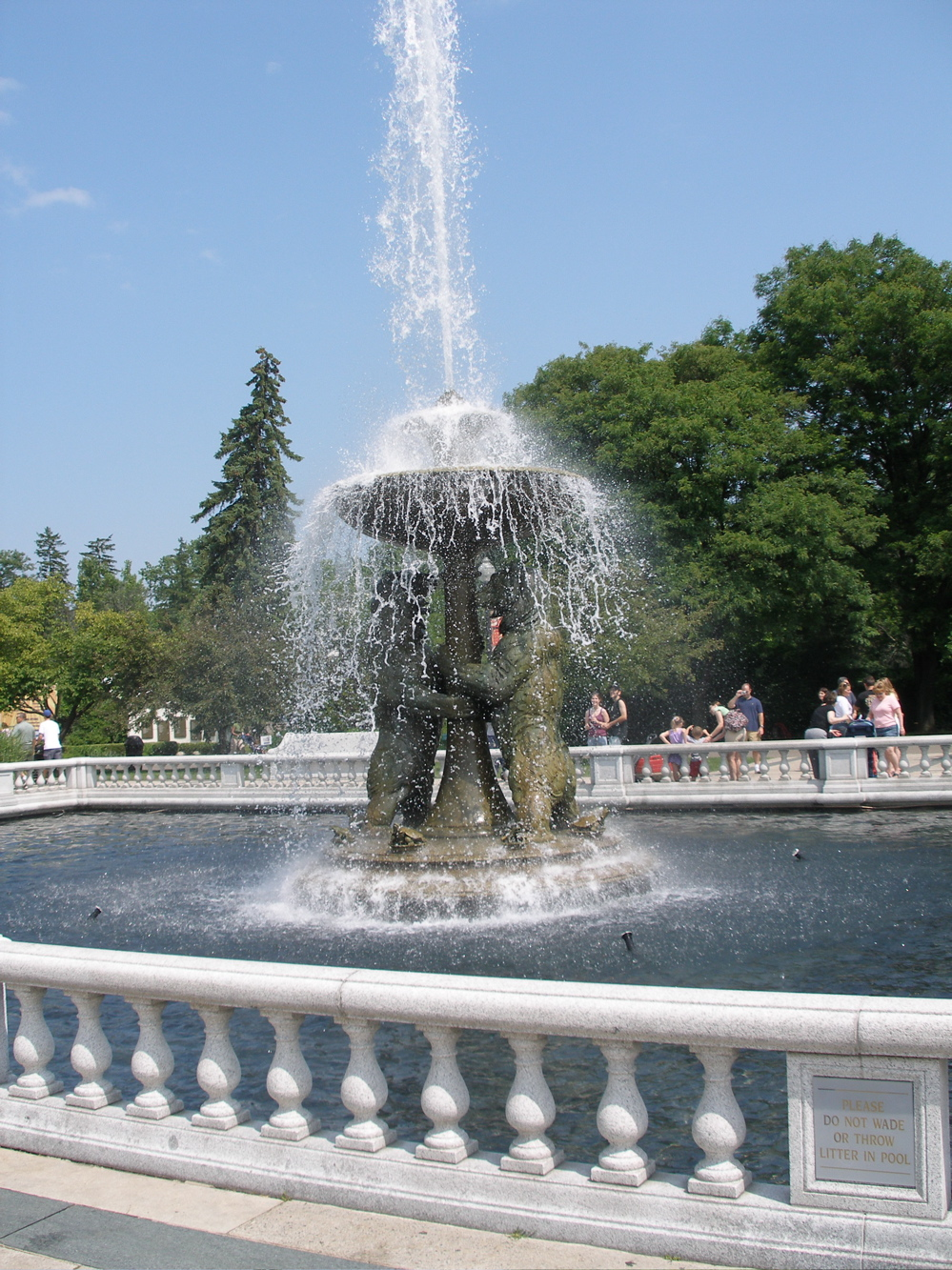
Horace Rackham Memorial Fountain by Corrado Parducci at the Detroit Zoo

Architectural sculpture
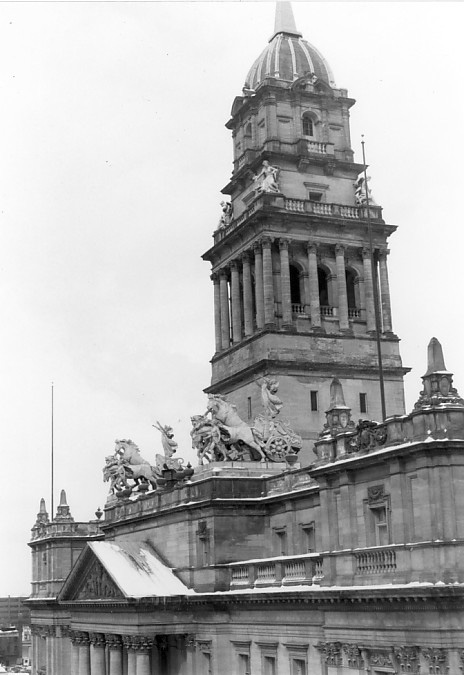
Victory and Progress
by J. Massey Rhind
Wayne County Building

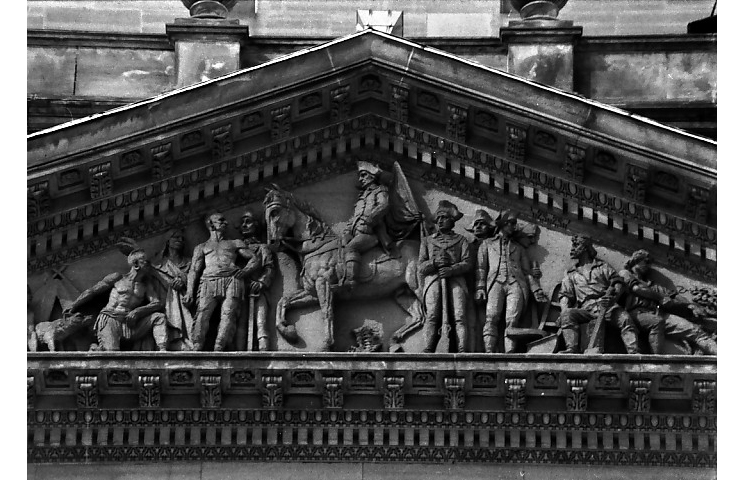
by Edward Wagner
Pediment
Wayne County Building

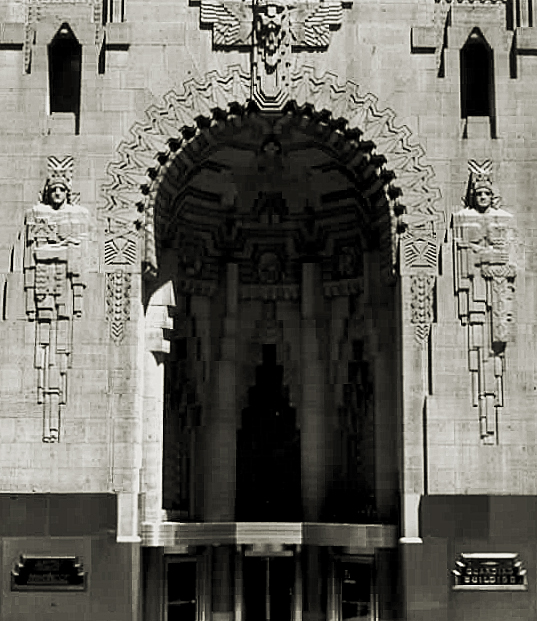
by Corrado Parducci
Guardian Building

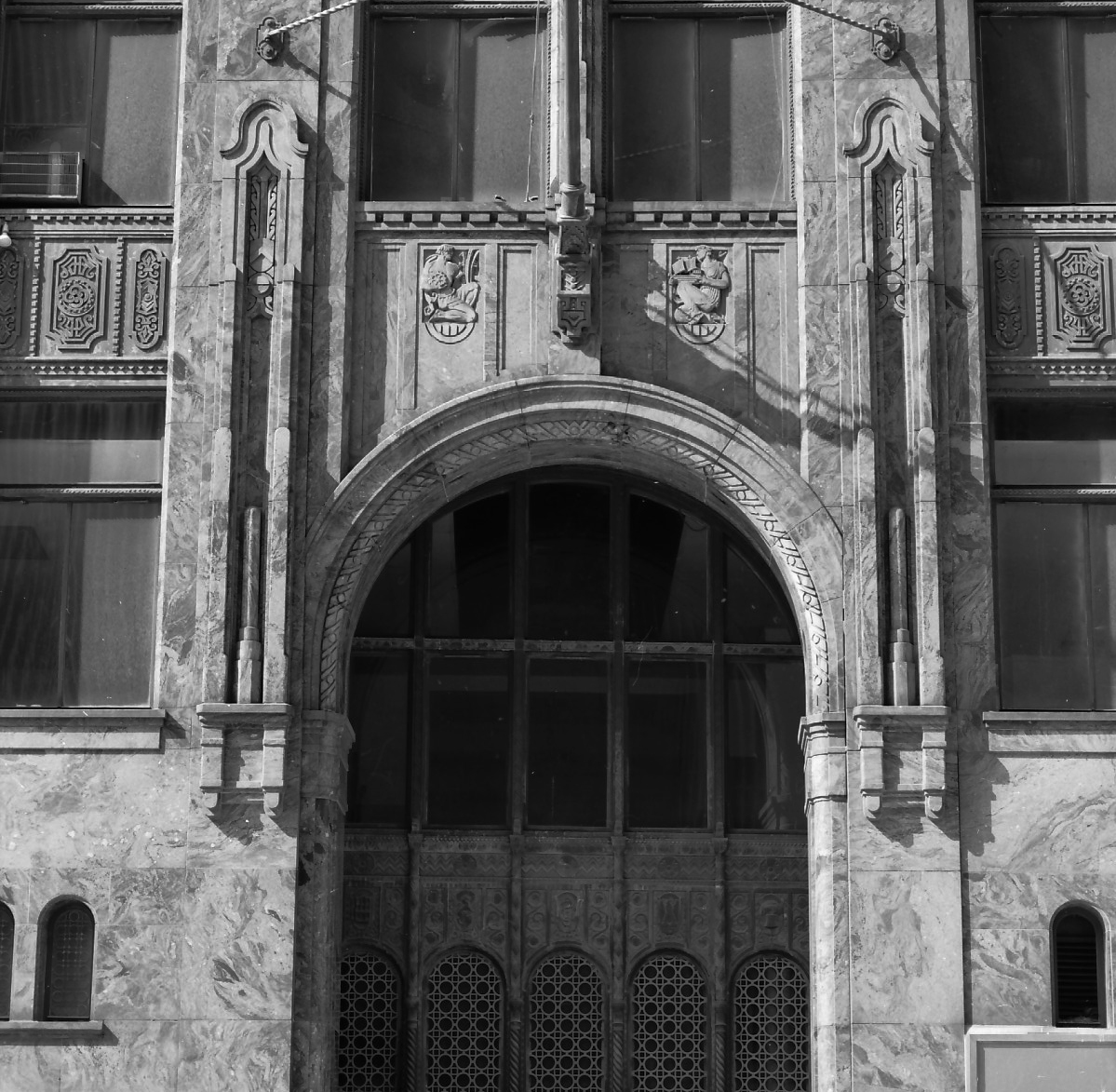
by Corrado Parducci
David Stott Building

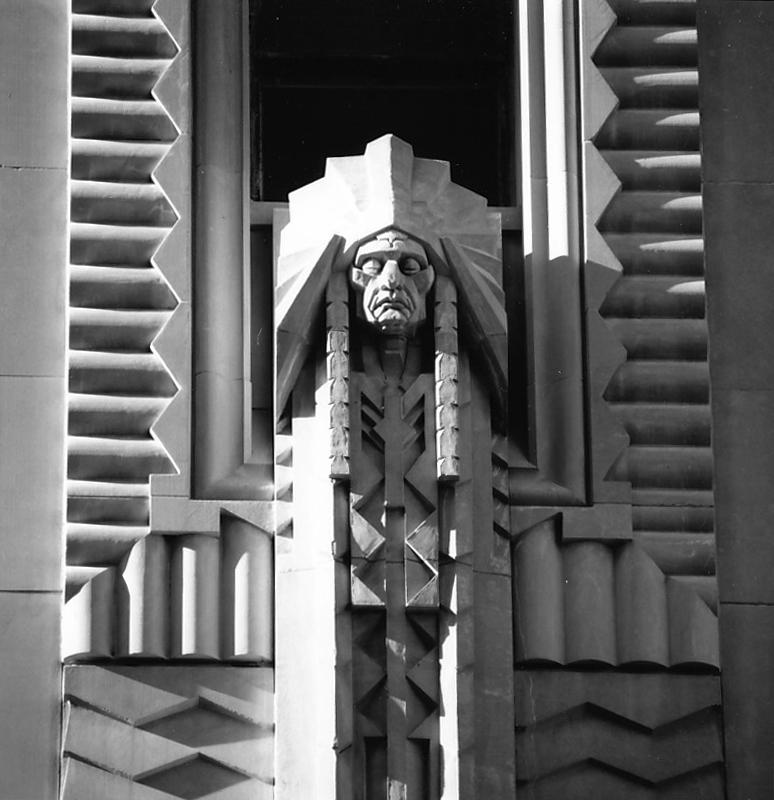
by Corrado Parducci
Penobscot Building

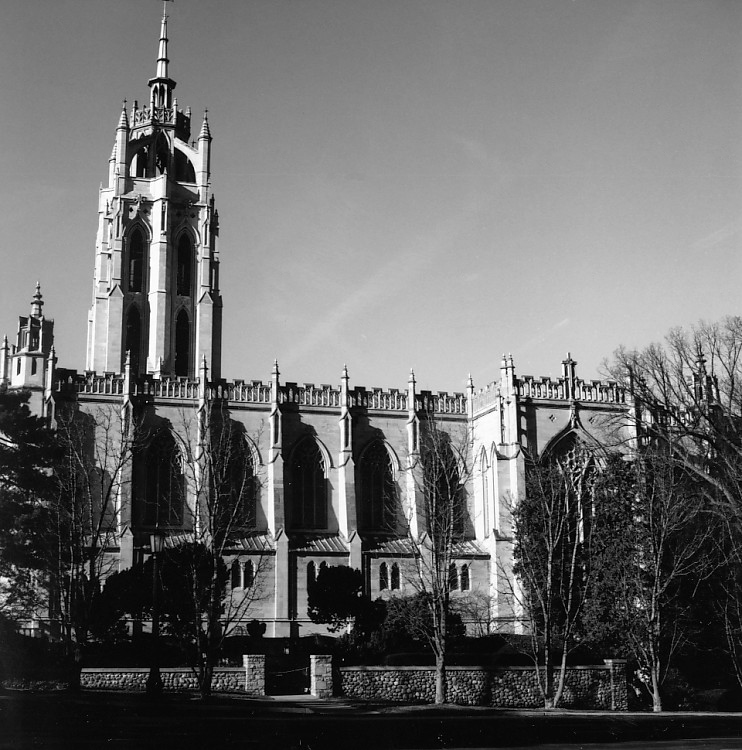
by Corrado Parducci and Lee Lawrie
Kirk in the Hills
by Wirt C. Rowland and George D. Mason

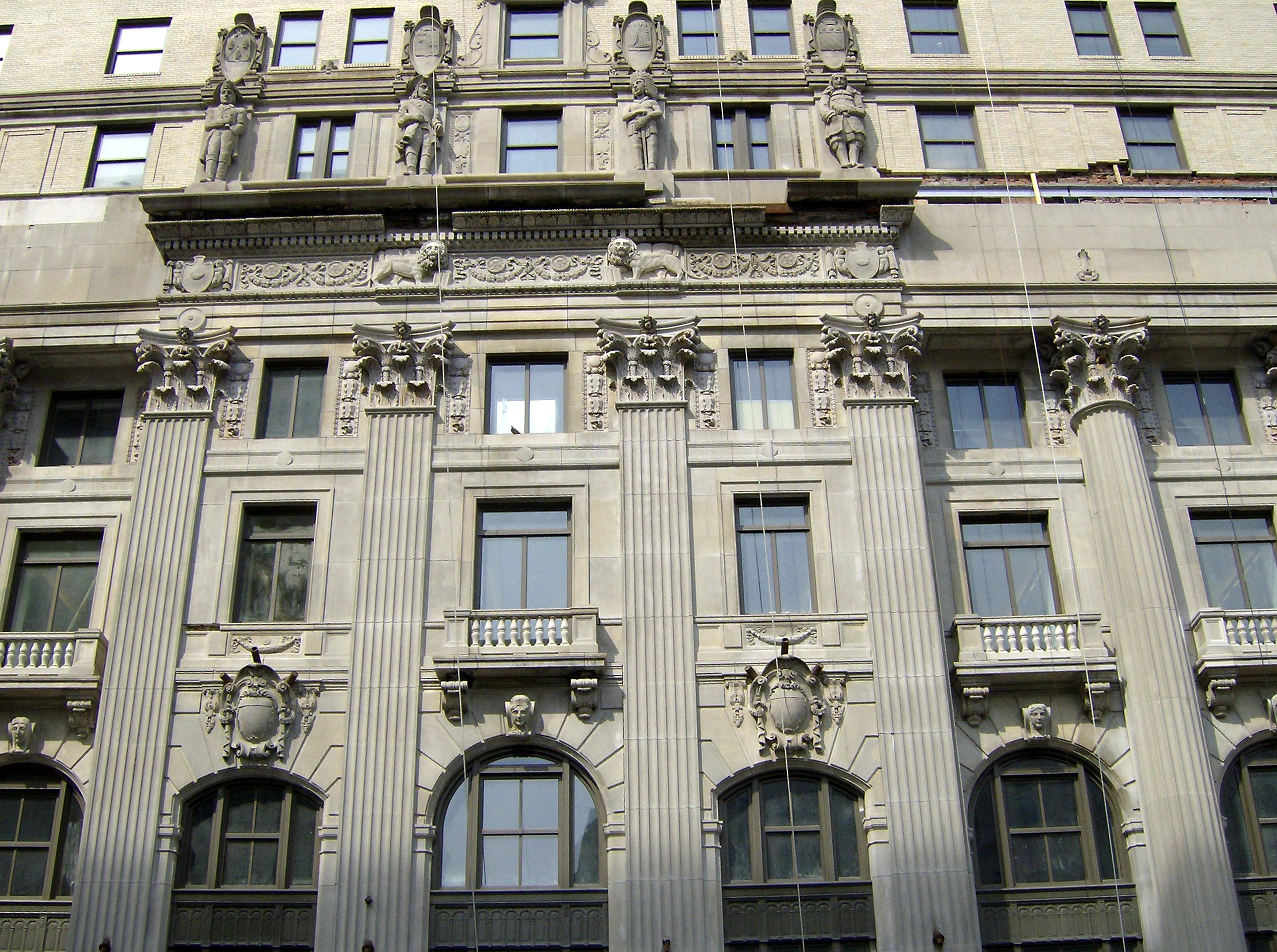
Westin Book Cadillac Hotel

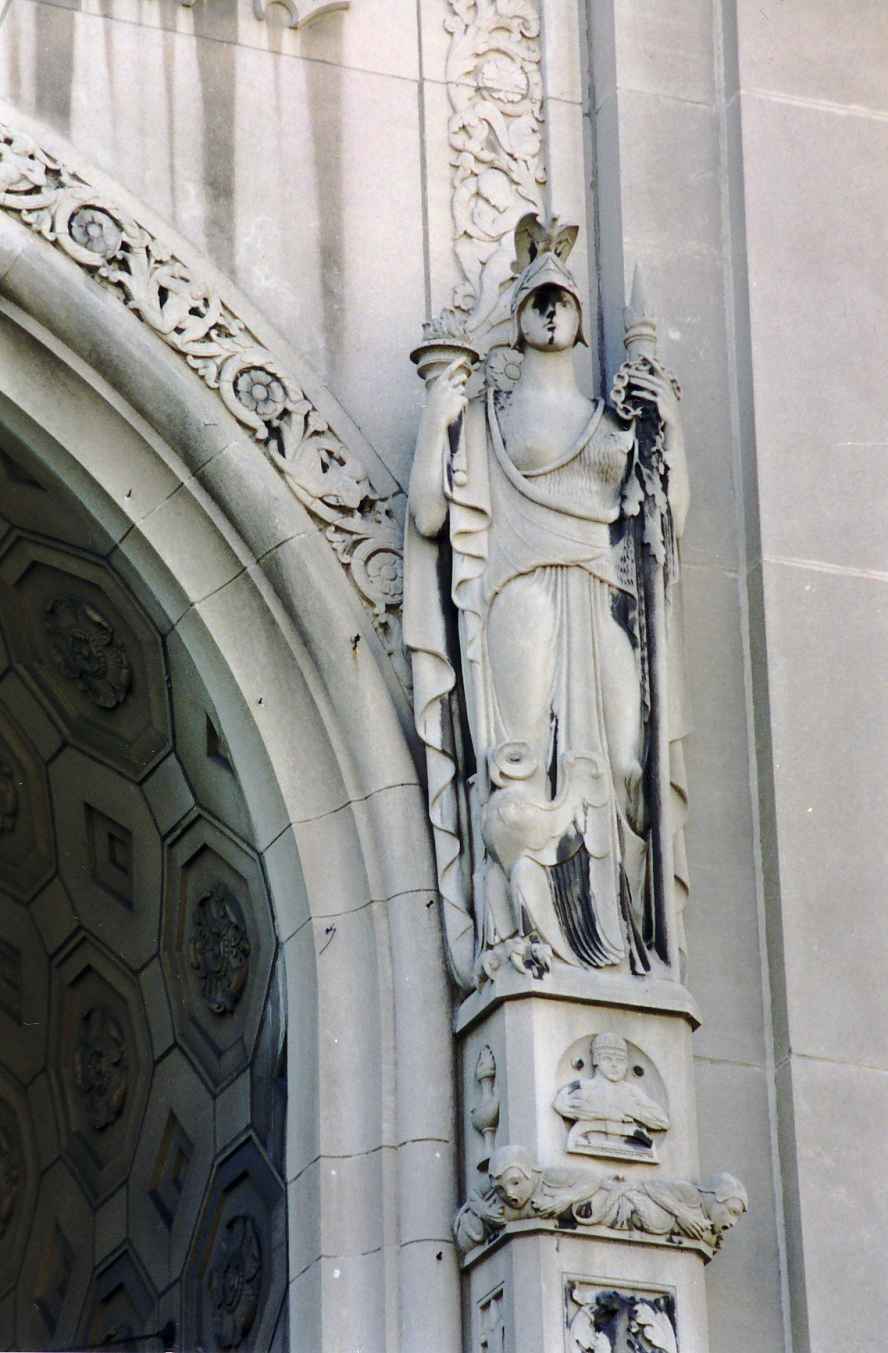
By Ulysses Ricci
Detroit Free Press Building

== References and further reading ==
- A&E with Richard Guy Wilson, Ph.D.,(2000). America's Castles: The Auto Baron Estates, A&E Television Network.
- A&E with Richard Guy Wilson, Ph.D.,(2000). America's Castles: Newspaper Moguls, Pittock Mansion, Cranbrook House & Gardens, The American Swedish Institute. A&E Television Network.
- Bridenstine, James (1989). Edsel and Eleanor Ford House. Wayne State University Press. ISBN 0-8143-2161-5.
- Collum, Marla O.; Barbara E. Krueger; Dorothy Kostuch (2012). Detroit's Historic Places of Worship. Wayne State University Press. ISBN 978-0-8143-3424-9.
- Delicato, Armando (2005). Italians in Detroit (Images of America). Arcadia Publishing. ISBN 0-7385-3985-6.
- Eckhert, Katheryn Bishop (1993). Buildings of Michigan (Society of Architectural Historians). New York: Oxford University Press. ISBN 0-19-506149-7.
- Ferry, W. Hawkins (1968). The Buildings of Detroit: A History. Wayne State University Press.
- Fisher, Dale (1996). Ann Arbor: Visions of the Eagle. Grass Lake, Michigan: Eyry of the Eagle Publishing. ISBN 0-9615623-4-X.
- Fisher, Dale (2003). Building Michigan: A Tribute to Michigan's Construction Industry. Grass Lake, Michigan: Eyry of the Eagle Publishing. ISBN 1-891143-24-7.
- Fisher, Dale (2005). Southeast Michigan: Horizons of Growth. Grass Lake, Michigan: Eyry of the Eagle Publishing. ISBN 1-891143-25-5.
- Fisher, Dale (1994). Detroit: Visions of the Eagle. Grass Lake, Michigan: Eyry of the Eagle Publishing. ISBN 0-9615623-3-1.
- Fogelman, Randall (2004). Detroit's New Center. Arcadia. ISBN 0-7385-3271-1.
- Gallagher, John; Balthazar Korab (2008). Great Architecture of Michigan. Wayne State University Press. ISBN 978-0-9816144-0-3.
- Godzak, Roman (2004). Catholic Churches of Detroit (Images of America). Arcadia Publishing. ISBN 0-7385-3235-5.
- Hardwick, M. Jeffrey (2003). Mall Maker: Victor Gruen, Architect of the American Dream. University of Pennsylvania Press. ISBN 0-8122-3762-5.
- Hauser, Michael; Marianne Weldon (2006). Downtown Detroit's Movie Palaces (Images of America). Arcadia Publishing. ISBN 0-7385-4102-8.
- Eric J. Hill; John Gallagher (2002). AIA Detroit: The American Institute of Architects Guide to Detroit Architecture. Wayne State University Press. ISBN 0-8143-3120-3.
- Kavanaugh, Kelli B. (2001). Detroit's Michigan Central Station (Images of America). Arcadia Publishing. ISBN 0-7385-1881-6.
- Kvaran, Einar Einarsson, Architectural Sculpture of America, unpublished manuscript
- Matuz, Roger (2007). Albert Kahn, Architect of Detroit. Wayne State University Press. ISBN 978-0-8143-2956-6.
- Nawrocki, Dennis Alan and Thomas J. Holleman (1980). Art in Detroit Public Places. Wayne State University Press.
- Portman, John; Jonathan Barnett (1976). The Architect as Developer. McGraw Hill. ISBN 0-07-050536-5.
- Rodriguez, Michael; Thomas Featherstone (2003). Detroit's Belle Isle Island Park Gem (Images of America). Arcadia Publishing. ISBN 0-7385-2315-1.
- Sharoff, Robert (2005). American City: Detroit Architecture. Wayne State University Press. ISBN 0-8143-3270-6.
- Savage, Rebecca Binno; Greg Kowalski (2004). Art Deco in Detroit (Images of America). Arcadia Publishing. ISBN 0-7385-3228-2.
- Sobocinski, Melanie Grunow (2005). Detroit and Rome: building on the past. Regents of the University of Michigan. ISBN 0-933691-09-2.
- Socia, Madeleine; Suzie Berschback (2001). Grosse Pointe: 1890–1930 (Images of America). Arcadia. ISBN 0-7385-0840-3.
- Tottis, James W. (2008). The Guardian Building: Cathedral of Finance. Wayne State University Press. ISBN 978-0-8143-3385-3.
- Tutag, Nola Huse; Hamilton, Lucy (1988). Discovering Stained Glass in Detroit. Wayne State University Press. ISBN 0-8143-1875-4.
- Walt, Irene; Balthazar Korab (2004). Art in Stations. Wayne State University Press. ISBN 0-9745392-0-1.
- Woodford, Arthur M. (2001). This is Detroit 1701–2001. Wayne State University Press. ISBN 0-8143-2914-4.
