= Detroit City (disambiguation) =

Detroit is a city in the U.S. state of Michigan.

Detroit City may also refer to:

- Detroit City (horse), a thoroughbred horse
- "Detroit City" (song), made popular by Bobby Bare, Tom Jones and Dean Martin
- Detroit City Football Club, an association football (soccer) club based in Detroit, Michigan
- Detroit City Apartments, a residential high-rise in Detroit, Michigan
