= Westin Book Cadillac Hotel =

Skyscraper in Detroit

The Westin Book Cadillac Detroit
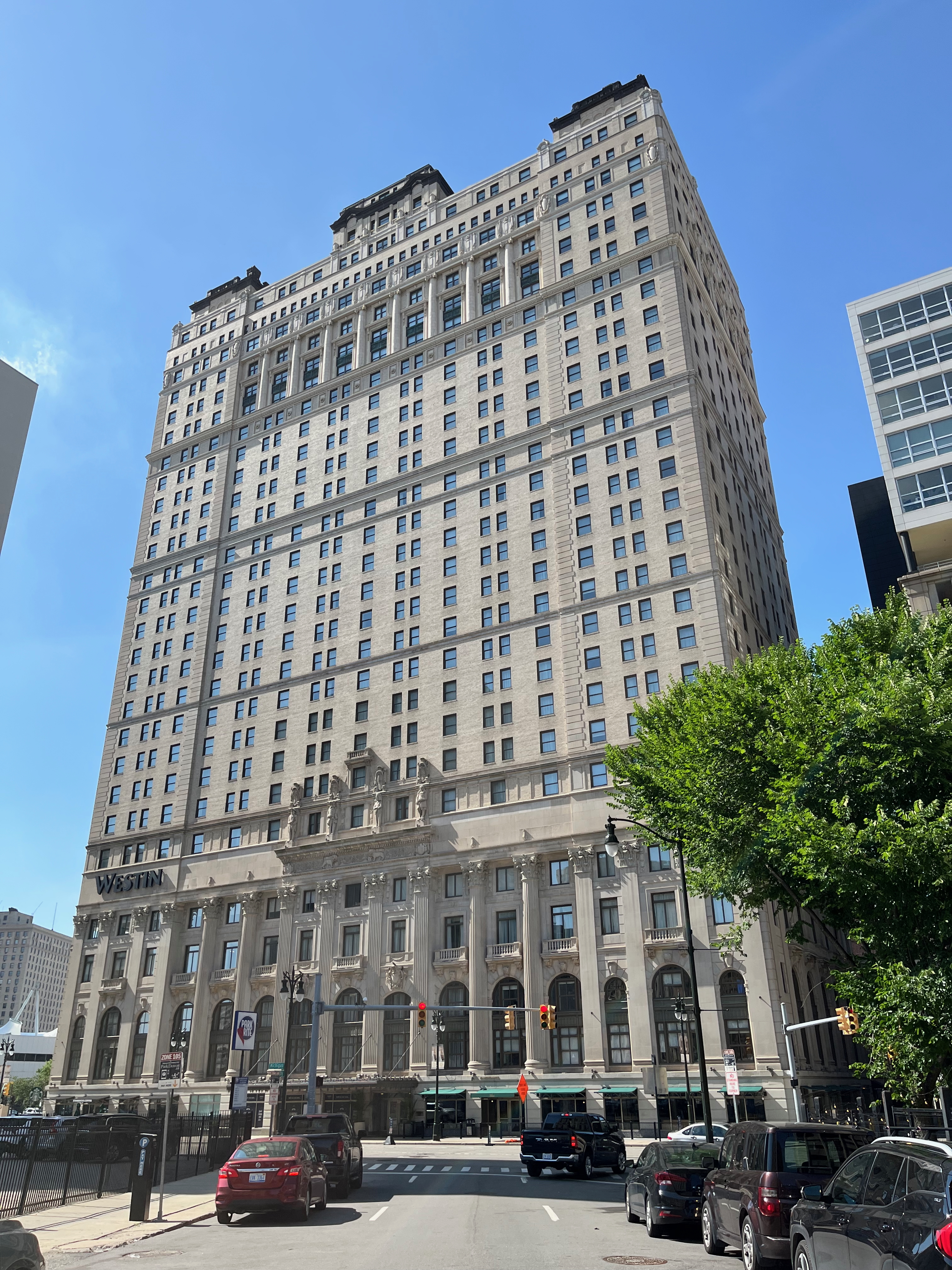

General information
- Type: hotel, residential, high-rise
- Architectural style: Neo-Renaissance
- Location: 1114 Washington Boulevard; Detroit, Michigan
- Coordinates: 42°19′55.02″N 83°3′1.89″W
- Completed: 1924; 102 years ago
- Renovated: 2008

Height
- Roof: 106.4 m (349 ft)
- Top floor: 103.6 m (340 ft)

Technical details
- Floor count: 29
- Floor area: 455 hotel rooms, 65 condominium units

Design and construction
- Architect: Louis Kamper

Renovating team
- Architect: Kaczmar
- Main contractor: Ferchill Group

Other information
- Public transit: Michigan; Detroit Air Xpress
- Book Cadillac Hotel
- U.S. Historic district – Contributing property
- Part of: Washington Boulevard Historic District (ID82002914)
- Designated CP: July 15, 1982

The Westin Book Cadillac Detroit is a historic hotel in downtown Detroit, Michigan, within the Washington Boulevard Historic District. Designed in the Neo-Renaissance style, and opened as the Book-Cadillac Hotel in 1924, the 349 ft (106 m), 31-story, 453-room hotel includes 65 exclusive luxury condominiums and penthouses on the top eight floors. It reopened in October 2008, managed by Westin Hotels, after a $200-million restoration.

== History ==
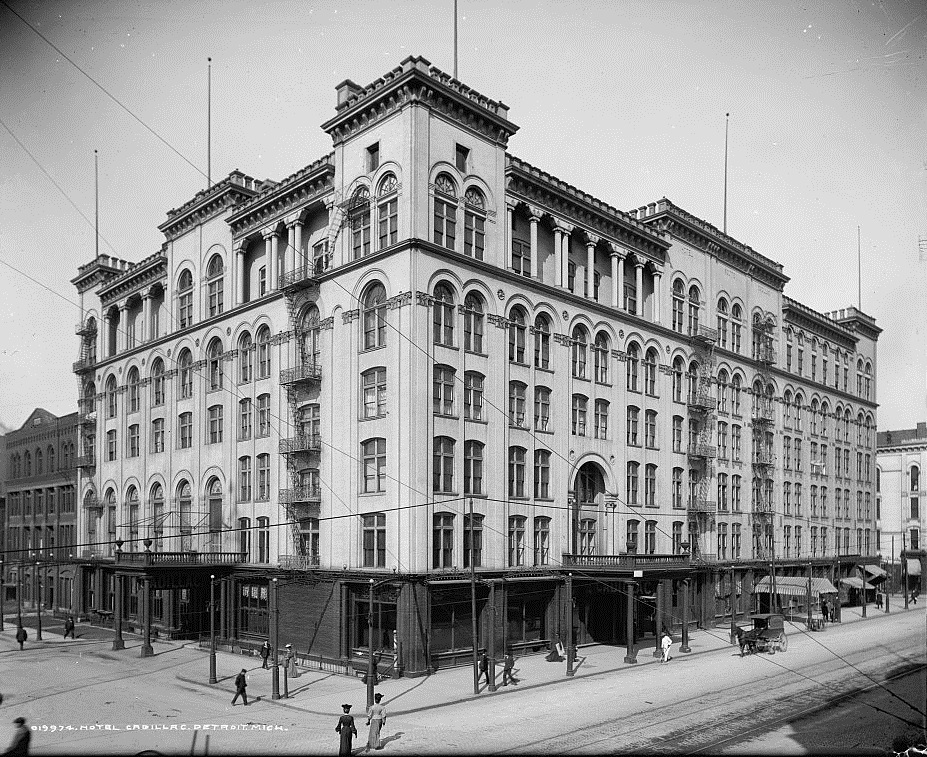
Cadillac Hotel, c. 1915

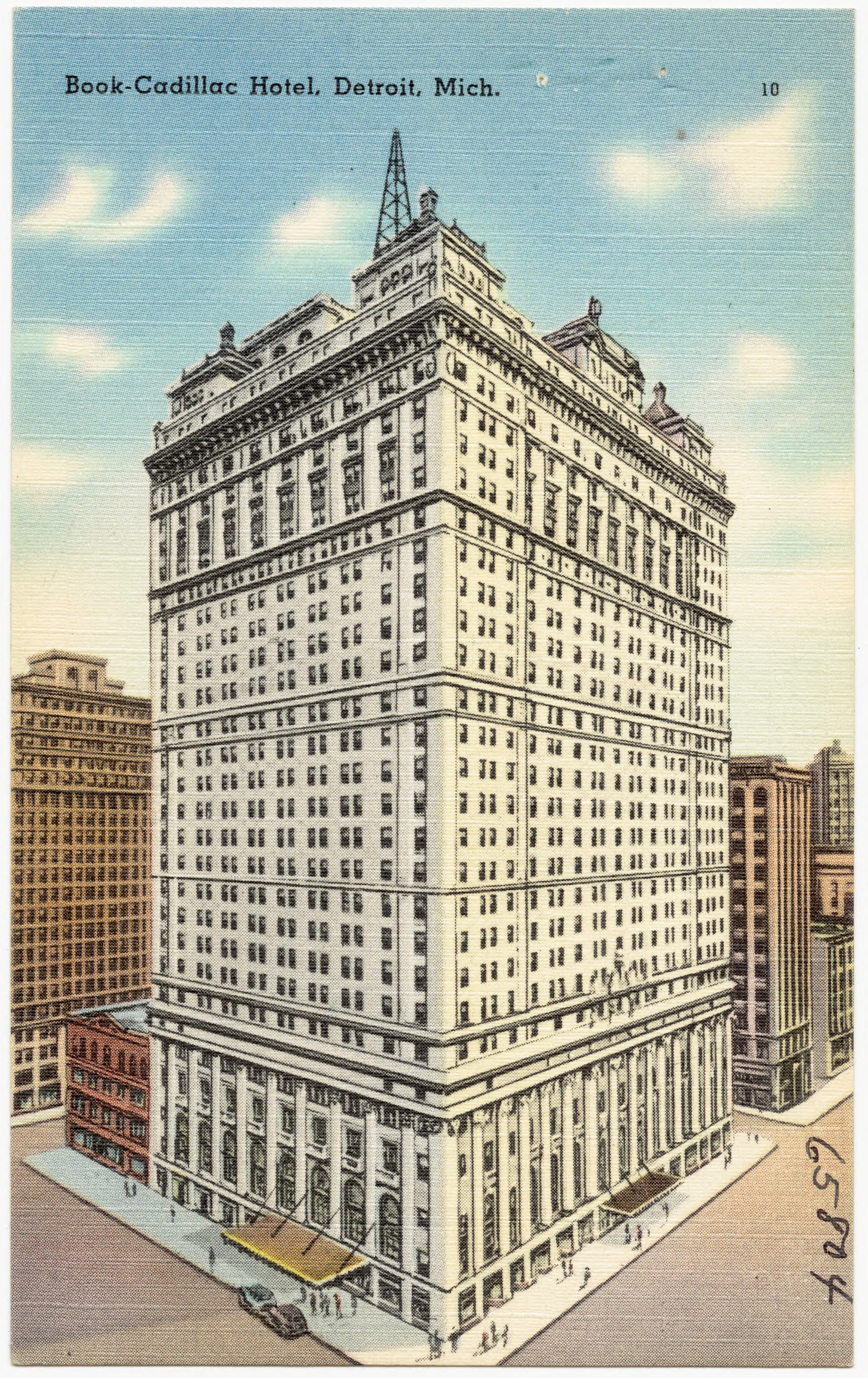
The Book-Cadillac Hotel, c. 1930s

The Book-Cadillac Hotel was developed by the Book Brothers—J. Burgess, Frank, and Herbert. They sought to turn Detroit's Washington Boulevard into the "Fifth Avenue of the West." Part of that vision was the creation of a flagship luxury hotel to compete against the Hotel Statler, three blocks to the north. On May 1, 1918, the brothers bought the Cadillac Hotel, at the northeast corner of Michigan and Washington Boulevard, which had been built in 1888. They intended to demolish it and replace it with a modern hotel, but World War I material shortages delayed the work. The Cadillac finally closed on June 26, 1923, and was quickly demolished. The Books commissioned architect Louis Kamper, who had designed the Book Building for them in 1917, to design their hotel. The Book-Cadillac Hotel was the tallest building in the city and the tallest hotel in the world when it opened on December 8, 1924.

The hotel cost $14 million to build and contained 1,136 guest rooms. Public spaces on the first five floors included three dining rooms, three ballrooms, a spacious lobby, and a ground floor retail arcade. On the hotel's top floor was radio station WCX, the predecessor to WJR. The hotel operated successfully until the Great Depression, when banks foreclosed and the Book brothers lost control in 1931. For much of the period after the Books lost ownership, the hotel was run by hotel industry pioneer Ralph Hitz's National Hotel Management Company.

On May 2, 1939, a meeting took place in the hotel lobby between New York Yankees first baseman Lou Gehrig and team manager Joe McCarthy in which Gehrig told McCarthy to leave him out of the starting line-up from that day's game against the Detroit Tigers, ending his 2,130 consecutive games streak.

In 1951, Sheraton bought the hotel, renamed it the Sheraton-Cadillac Hotel, and undertook massive renovations. All public spaces except the ballrooms and Italian Garden were redone and escalators replaced the grand staircase. In 1975, with business declining and the hotel in need of another renovation, Sheraton sold the building to Herbert R. Weissberg and it became the Detroit-Cadillac Hotel. Soon after, Weissberg defaulted on a loan, and the Bank of the Commonwealth acquired the hotel's mortgage. They partnered with Minneapolis-based Radisson Hotels to manage the hotel and oversee renovations, as Radisson had just successfully done at Kansas City's Muehlebach Hotel. The remodeling work cost $6 million, and the hotel reopened in June 1978 as the Radisson Cadillac Hotel. Though it had been considered the city's top hotel for many years, in late 1979, the owners announced that the hotel would close due to declining occupancy. The City of Detroit, scheduled to host the 1980 Republican National Convention, did not want to face the prospect of losing more downtown hotel space, so the city entered into a partnership through the Detroit Economic Growth Corporation with the owners to keep the hotel open. The hotel ceased to be managed by Radisson in 1980 and became the Book Cadillac Hotel once again. By that point, multiple guestroom floors of the aging hotel had been entirely closed off and mothballed, and only 768 of its 947 rooms were considered "saleable."

In 1983, it was decided that the only way to bring the financially ailing hotel back to profitability was to convert it into a mixed-use property. The hotel's nearly 1000 rooms were deemed too numerous to fill and were far too small by modern standards. The plan would turn the building into the Book-Cadillac Plaza, containing a smaller 550-room hotel on 12 floors, and 11 floors of redeveloped office space. The hotel closed its doors in October 1984 for the renovation. However, those plans were quickly dashed, as proposed construction costs soared, and Detroit's economic situation continued to deteriorate. For the next two years, developers came and went, but with no one able to take on the increasingly complex renovation, the building's contents were finally liquidated in 1986. After the sale, the hotel's retail tenants, who had planned to stay through the renovation, moved out and the building was shuttered. It would remain in that state for the next 20 years. Time passed and the unmaintained property decayed, a it fell victim to the elements, vandalism, and urban scavengers.

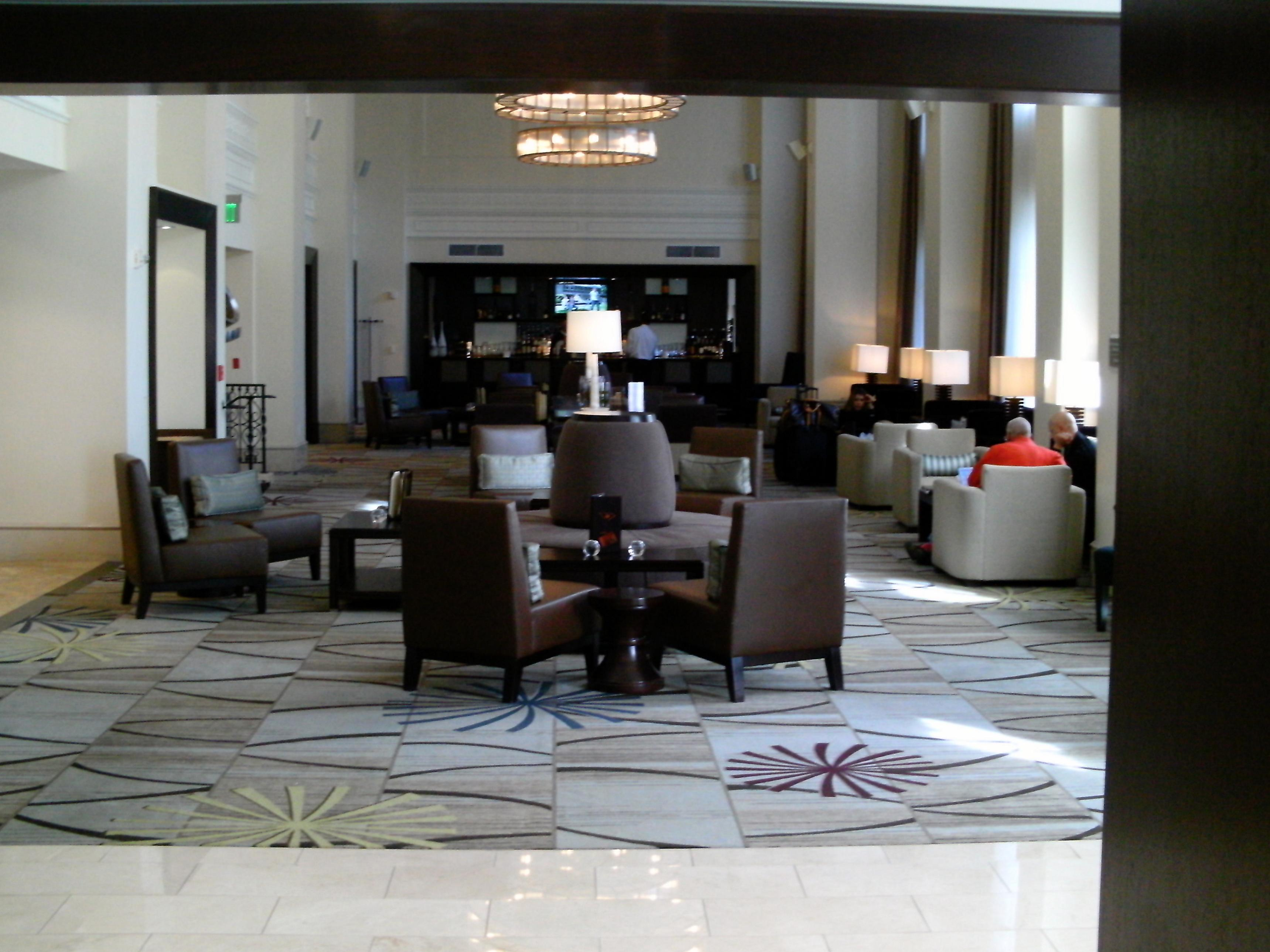
Renovated interior

In July 2003, after years of legal battles to fully acquire the building and find a developer, the city of Detroit announced a $150 million renovation deal with Historic Hospitality Investments, a subsidiary of Kimberly-Clark, to turn the building into a Renaissance Hotel. Work started shortly after the announcement, but came to a halt in November, when construction crews discovered more damage than anticipated. The associated cost overrun caused Kimberly-Clark to back out of the deal. A new renovation plan, through the Cleveland-based Ferchill Group, was announced in June 2006, with the Book-Cadillac to become a Westin Hotel and Residences. Kaczmar Architects Inc. of Cleveland and interior design firm ForrestPerkins of Dallas oversaw the design work, and renovations took place from August 2006 to fall 2008. The Westin Book Cadillac Detroit celebrated its grand opening on October 25, 2008.

The hotel was acquired by Oxford Capital Group in December 2021 for an undisclosed sum, after The Ferchill Group faced foreclosure due to the negative economic impact of the COVID-19 pandemic on the hotel. The new owners announced a $20 million renovation of the entire property in November 2022, which was completed in 2023.

== Architecture ==
Architect Louis Kamper designed the hotel in the Renaissance Revival style at the corner of Washington Boulevard and Michigan Avenue. Abutting the hotel on the north was the headquarters of the Detroit Edison Company. The structure is a steel skeleton faced with beige brick and limestone accents. It has Neo-Classical elements and building sculpture. Among its notable features are the sculptures of notable figures from Detroit's history—General Anthony Wayne, Antoine Laumet de La Mothe, sieur de Cadillac, Chief Pontiac, and Robert Navarre along the ornate Michigan Avenue façade and copper-covered roof elements.

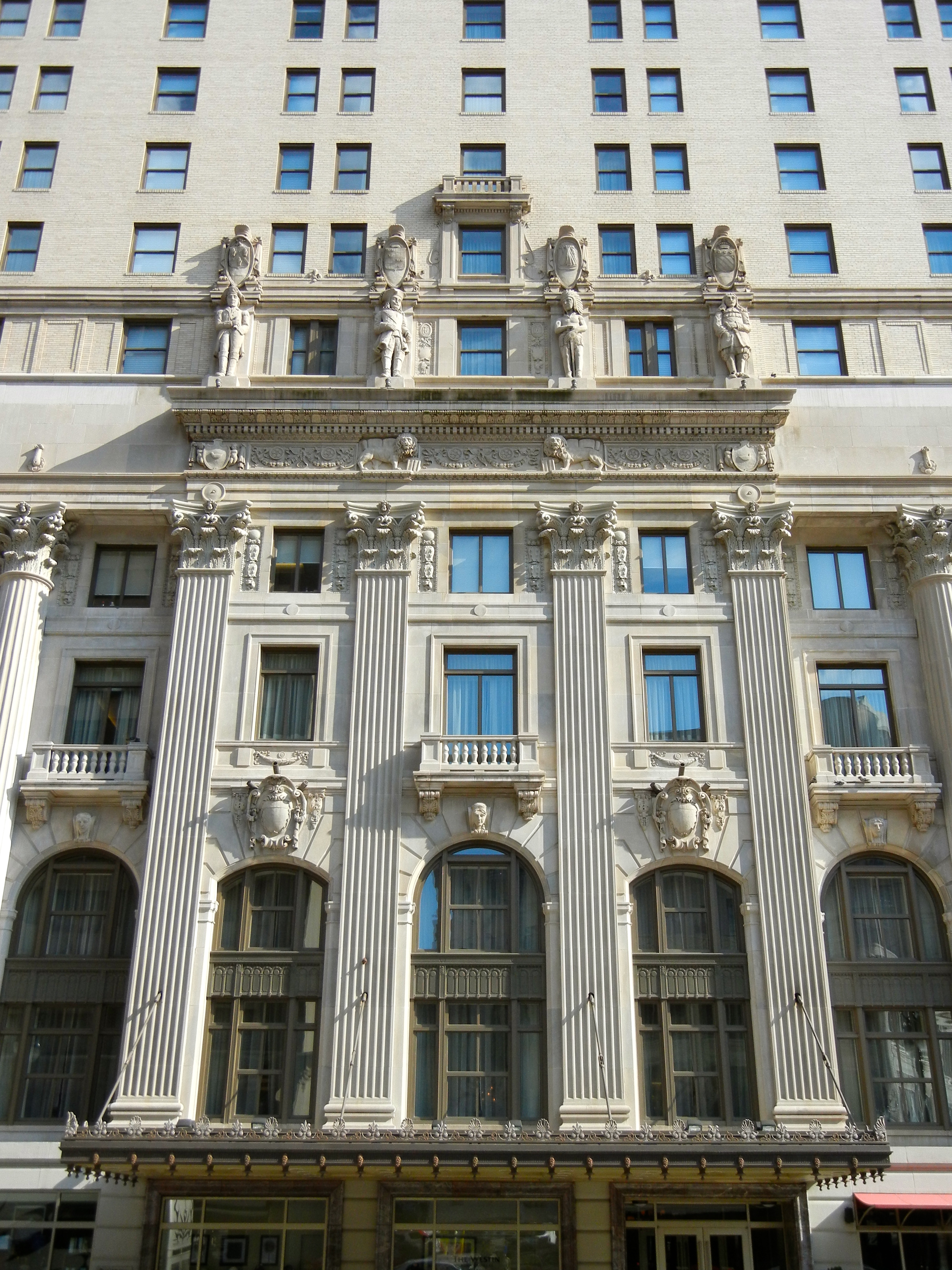
Detail of the Michigan Avenue façade

The lower six floors are clad in limestone. On the ground floor it is carved into wide horizontal bands while floors two through five are smooth. Corinthian pilasters and columns separate the windows of the public rooms from the second to fifth floors with windows for the second and third floors contained in large arches. Windows on the fourth floor are framed by small balconies. Above the sixth floor, the exterior is beige brick with cornices at floors 7, 16 and 21. Ionic columns frame windows on floors 23 through 25. A large cornice encircled the 27th floor and was removed during an earlier renovation.

Limestone quoins accent three corners of the building which are capped with copper-clad ziggurats. The north and south sides have penthouse towers that extend to the 31st floor. When the north penthouse was reconstructed, it was built 18 ft (5.5 m) shorter to make the ziggurats the highest points of the building. The building sits atop three basements, which contain some inoperable mechanical equipment too large to remove during renovation.

On June 27, 2006, the Ferchill Group agreed to renovate the structure into a mixed-use hotel and condominium building including a 453-room Westin Hotel, and 65 condominium units priced above $280,000. ForrestPerkins completed interior designs for the project which cost $176 million and was completed in fall 2008. As part of the renovation some of the original decor of the Grand Ballroom (renamed the Venetian Ballroom) and Italian Garden was recreated. A three-story addition containing a new 11,000-square-foot (1,000 m^{2}) ballroom, pool, hot-tub, fitness center, spa, and additional conference space was built north of the hotel on the site previously occupied by the Detroit Edison Headquarters.

Across Shelby Street from the hotel, the Peoples' Outfitting building, also known as the Detroit Commerce Building, was demolished and replaced with a 10-story parking garage for hotel guests and residents. In 2017, apartments were built above the parking garage.

== In popular culture ==
- The bar and coffee shop played court to Detroit's notorious Purple Gang, whose leader Abe Bernstein maintained a residence on the top floor until his death in 1968.
- On May 2, 1939, New York Yankee first baseman Lou Gehrig collapsed on the hotel's grand staircase. Gehrig, who would later be diagnosed with amyotrophic lateral sclerosis, decided to sit-out that afternoon's game against the Detroit Tigers, ending his consecutive games played streak.
- The 1947 Frank Capra movie State of the Union featured scenes that were filmed at the hotel.
- Scenes in the 1973 cult movie Detroit 9000 were shot at the hotel.
- The HGTV show House Hunters aired an episode entitled "Settling Down in Detroit" in which a couple searches for a historic home in Detroit. They end up choosing one of the newly restored condos in the hotel.
- Michael Symon, who hosted the shows Food Feuds and Cook Like an Iron Chef and appeared as host and judge on four Food Network/Cooking Channel shows as a host and a judge, owned and operated Roast restaurant at the Westin Book Cadillac Hotel from 2008 until its closure on January 9, 2022.
- The hotel's 28th-floor penthouse suite was mentioned in restaurant critic Gael Greene's biography "Insatiable" as the place where she interviewed the then 22-year-old Elvis Presley after the second of his two shows at the Olympia Stadium on March 31, 1957.

== Gallery ==
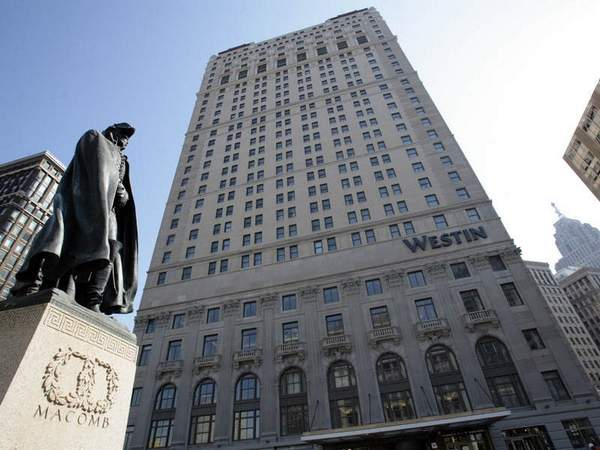
The hotel is part of Detroit's Washington Boulevard Historic District

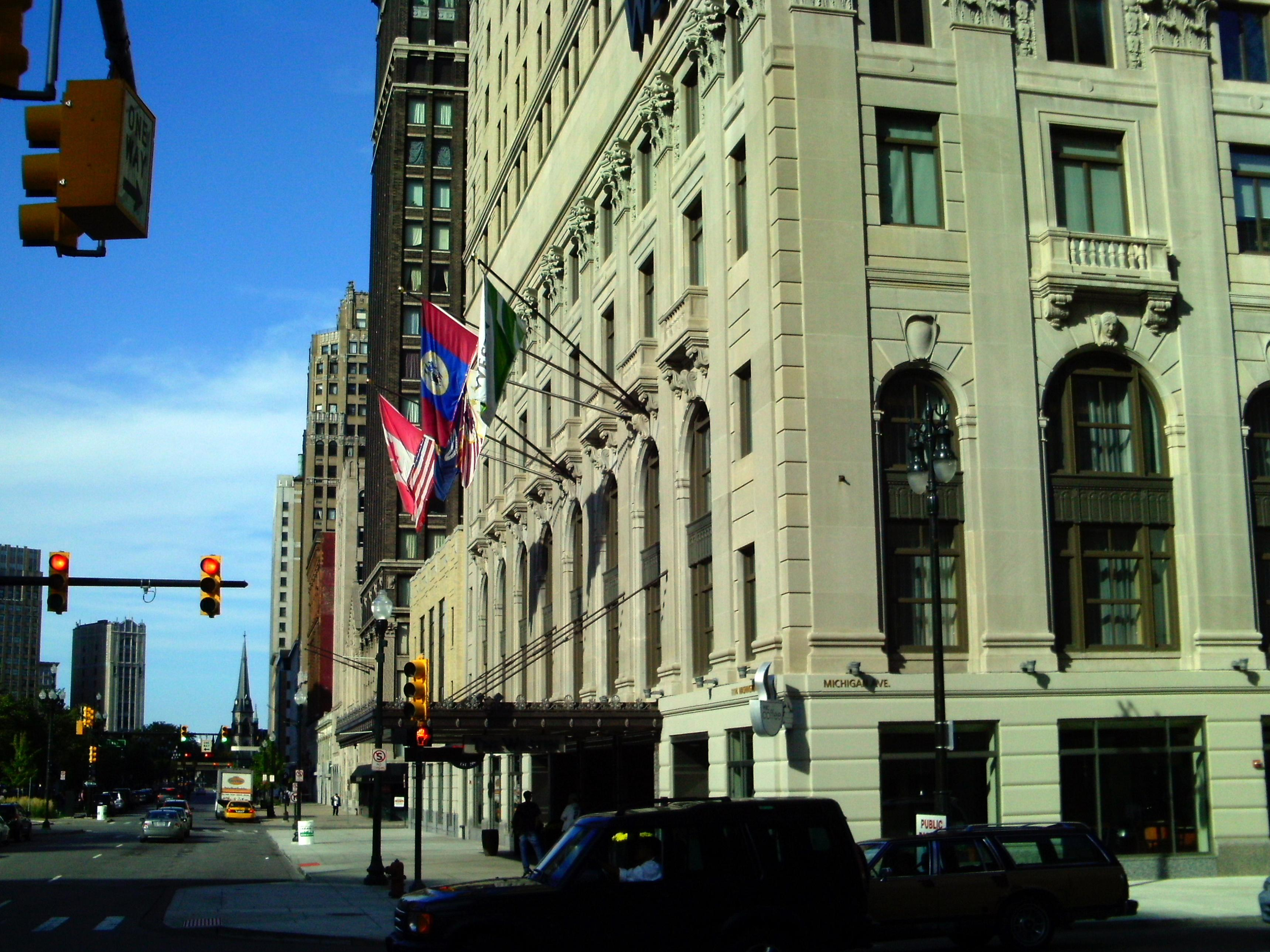
Main entrance on Washington Boulevard

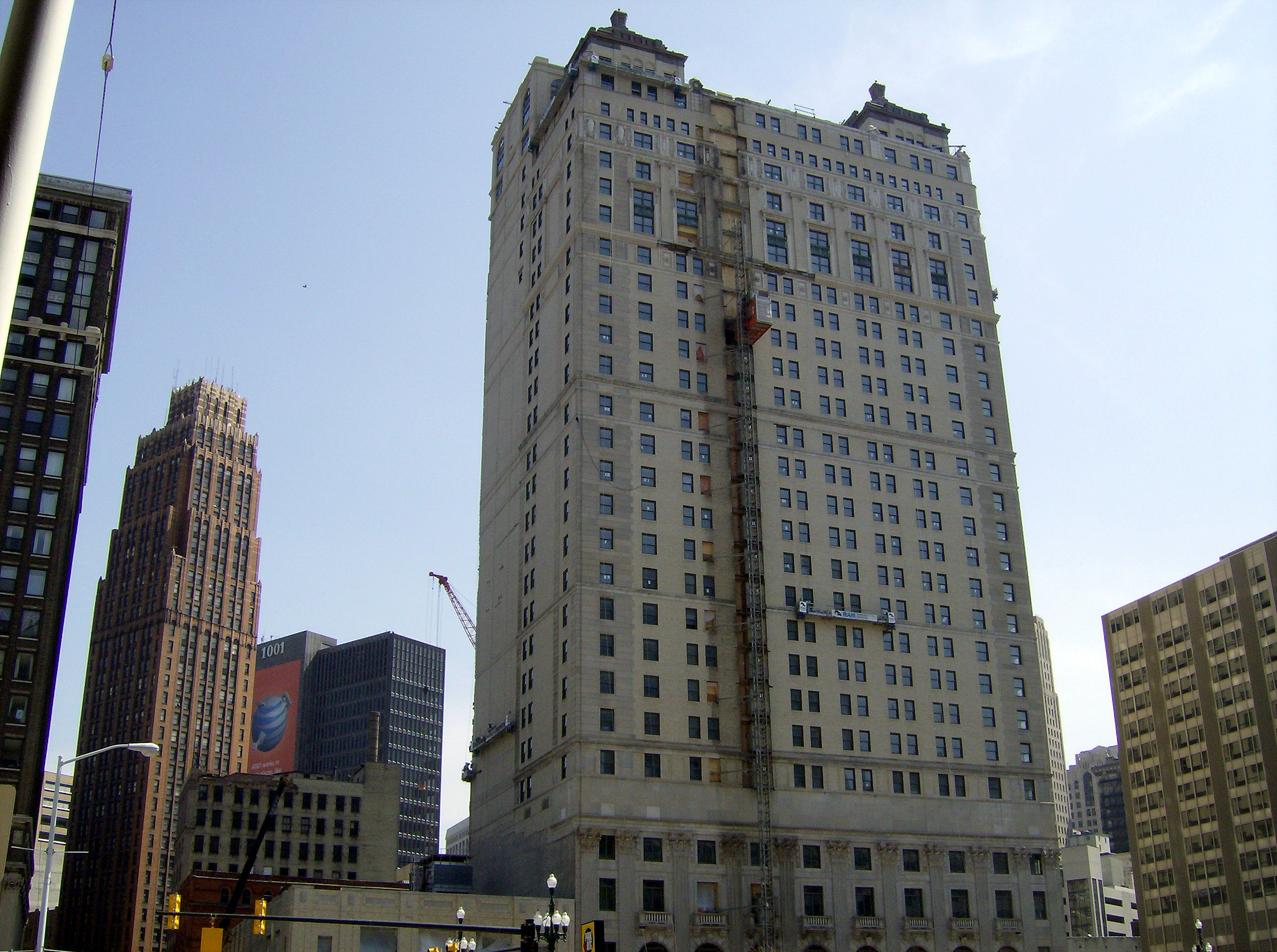
Under reconstruction in April 2008

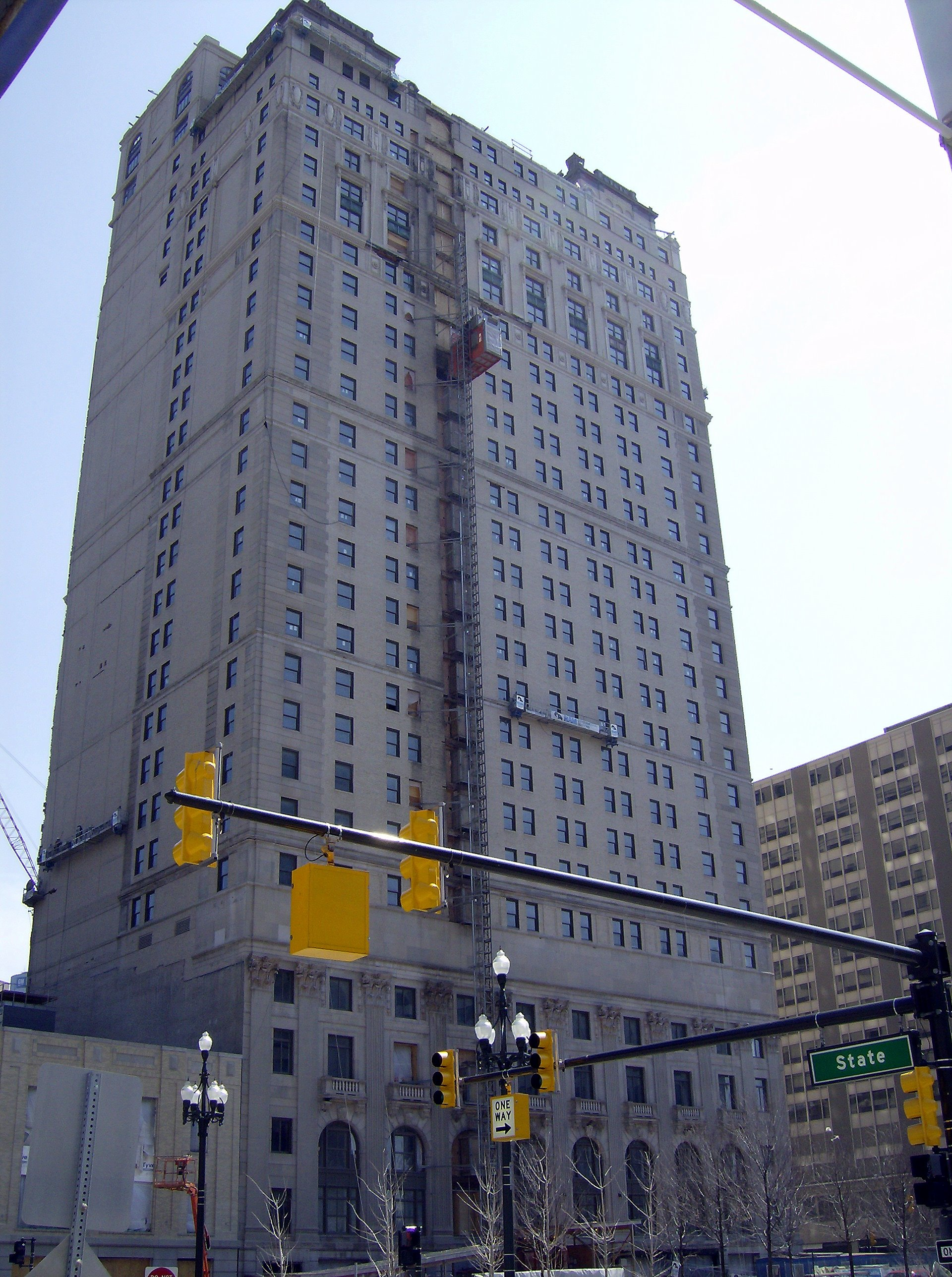
Construction in April 2008 with the new wing on the left

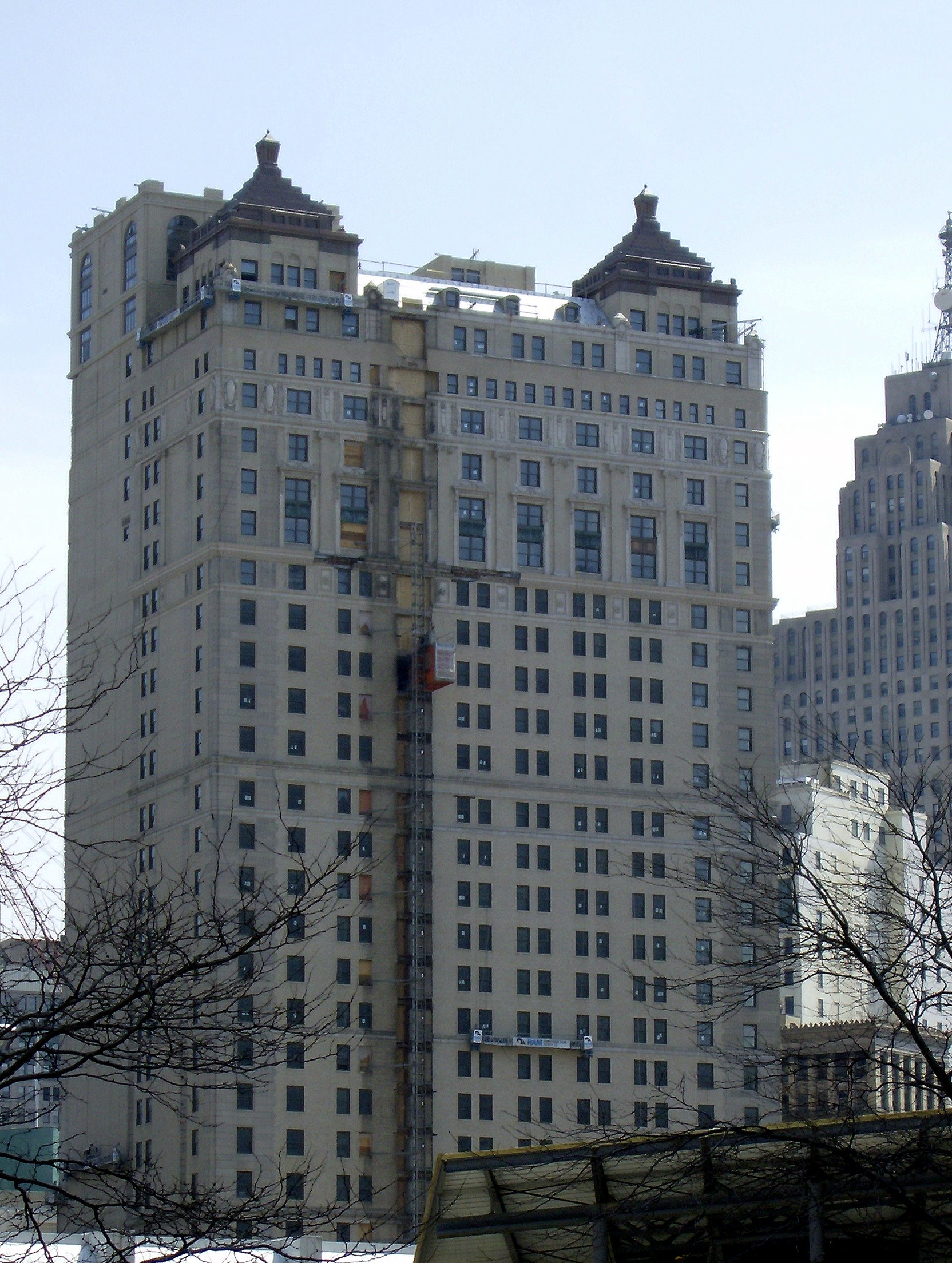
Washington Blvd. façade

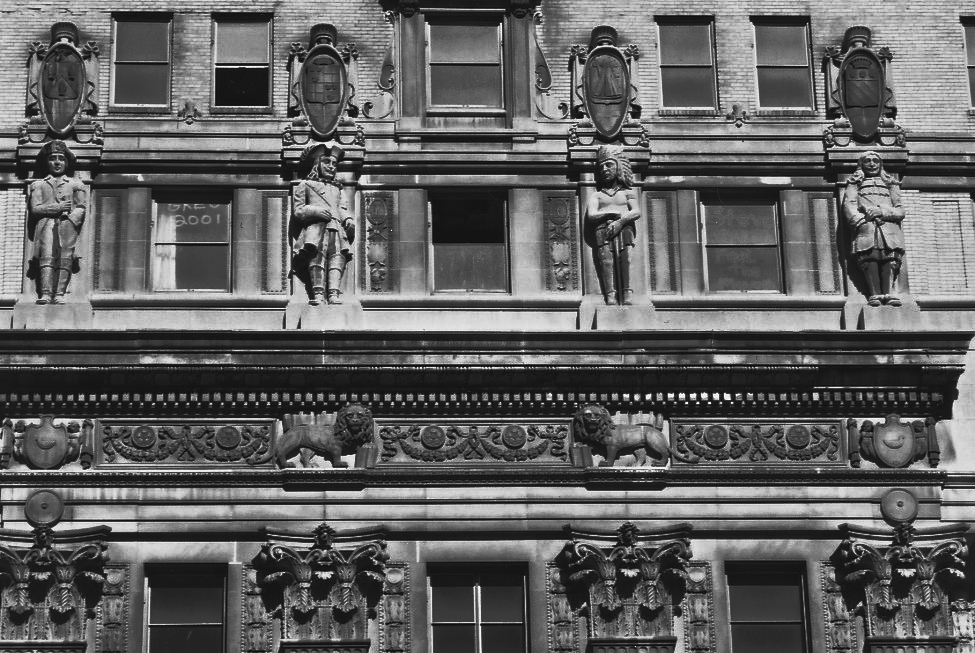
Michigan Ave. façade prior to restoration

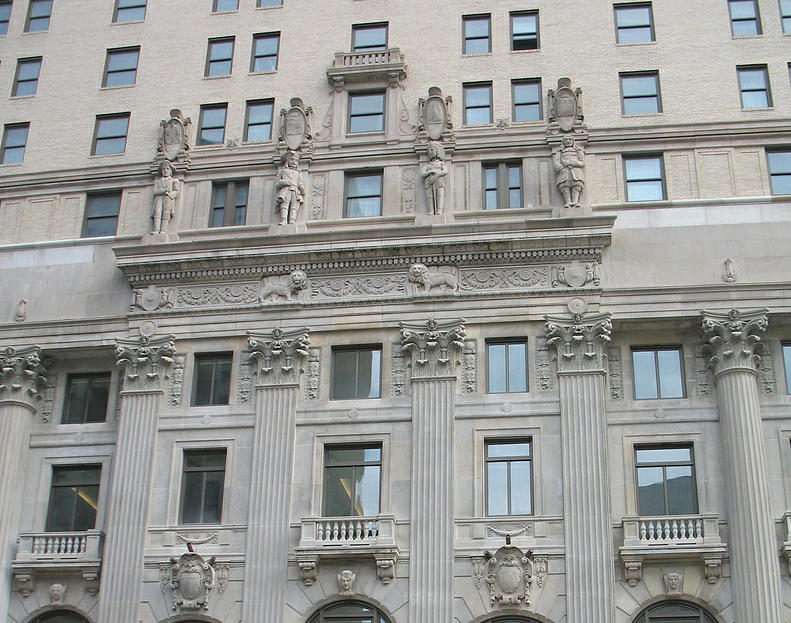
Sculptures above the Michigan Ave. entrance after restoration

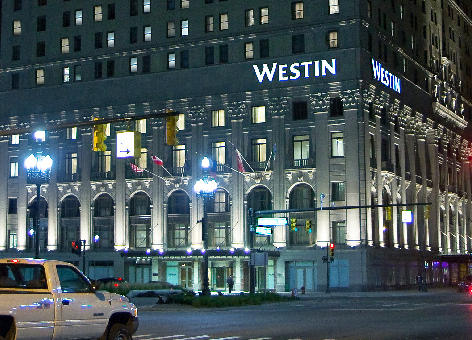
Exterior at night

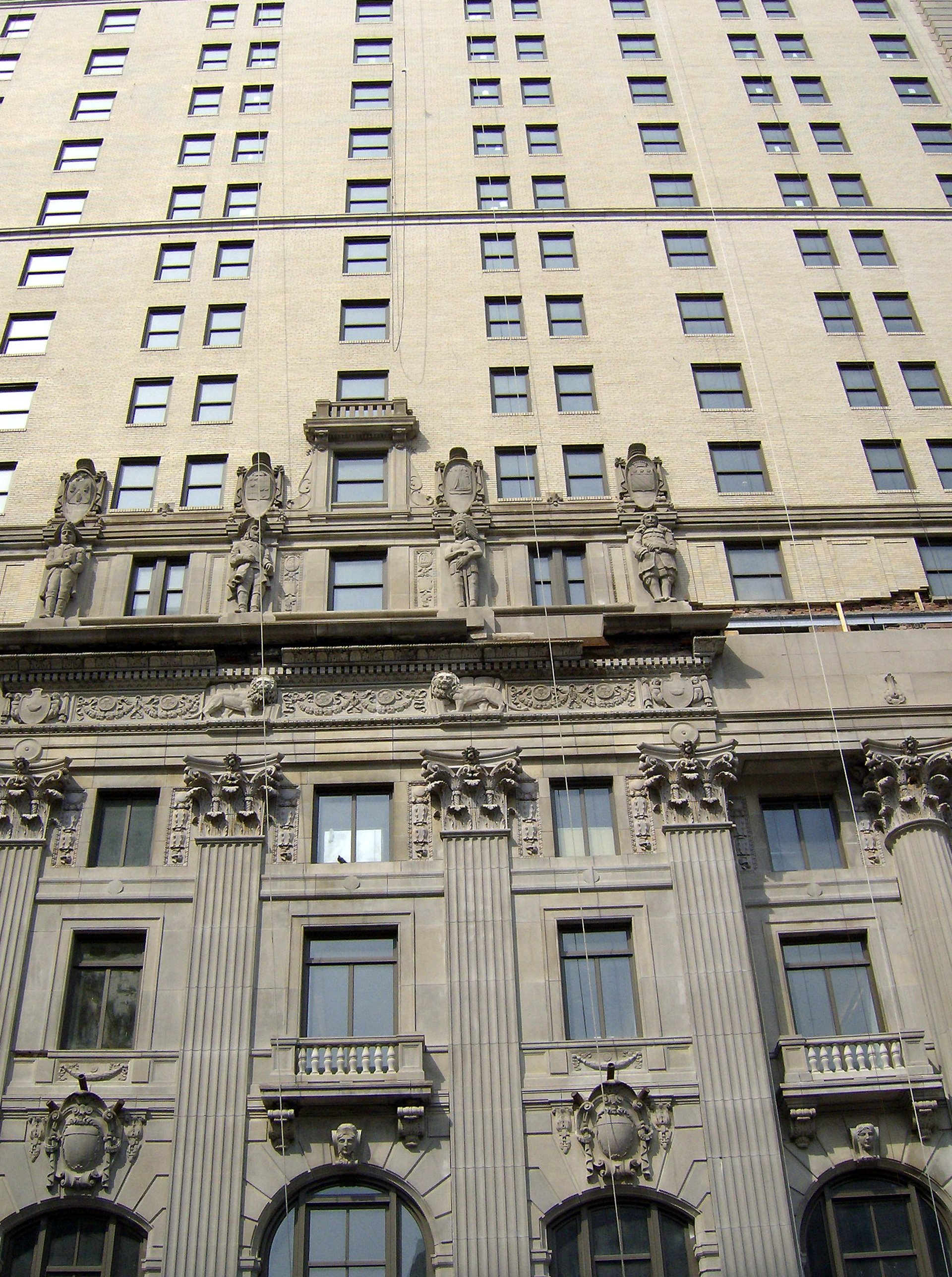
Restored Michigan Avenue façade

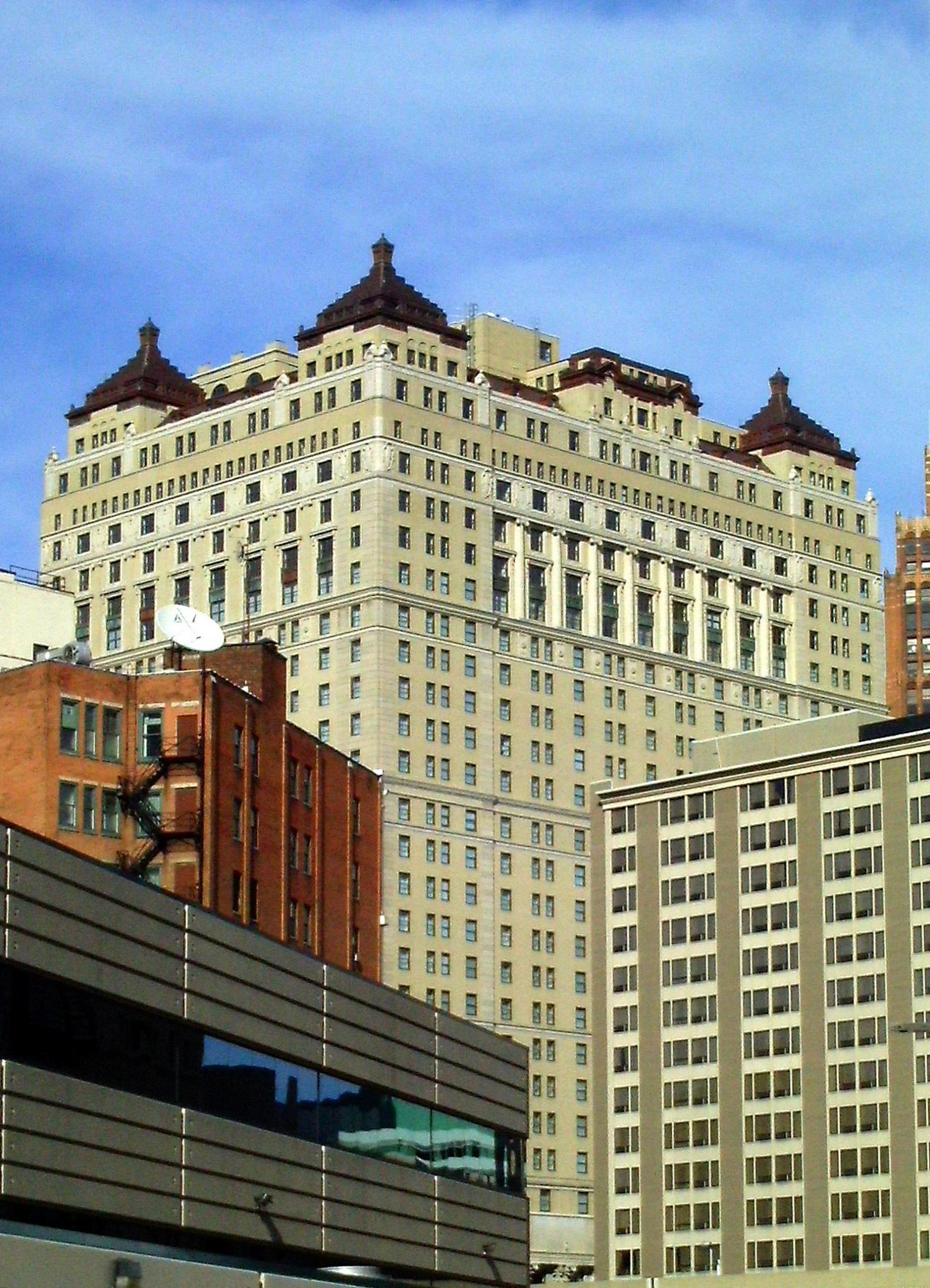
Restored building looking northeast

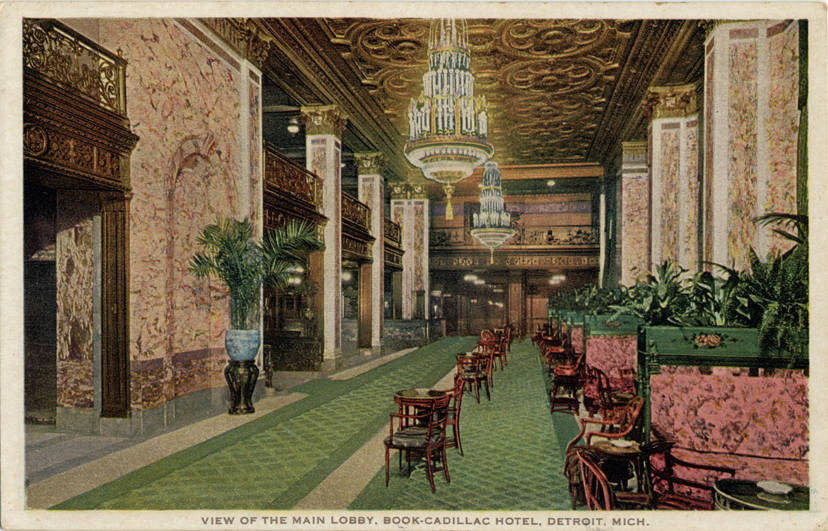
Main Lobby, circa 1910s (postcard)

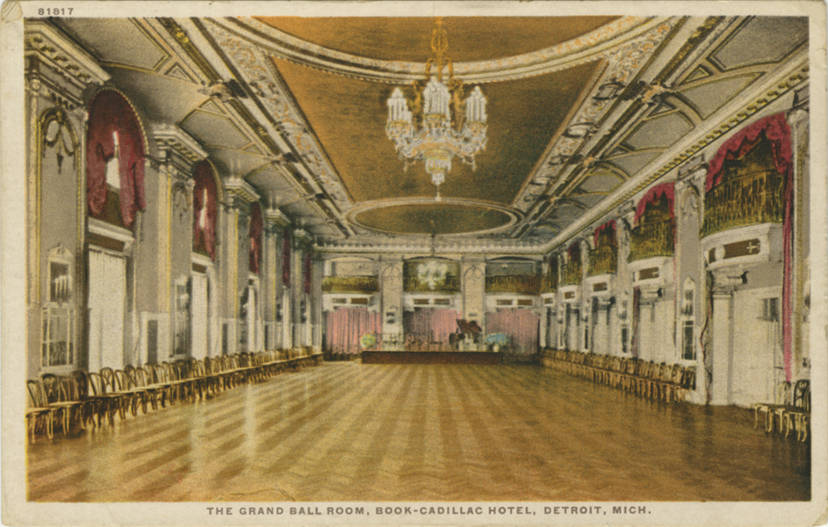
Grand Ball Room, circa 1910s (postcard)

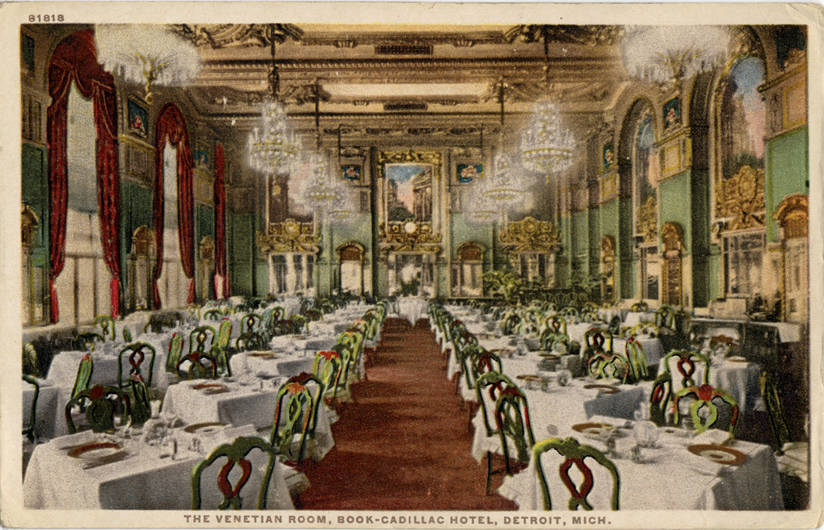
Venetian Room, circa 1910s (postcard)

== See also ==
- List of tallest buildings in Detroit
