= Fort Washington Plaza =

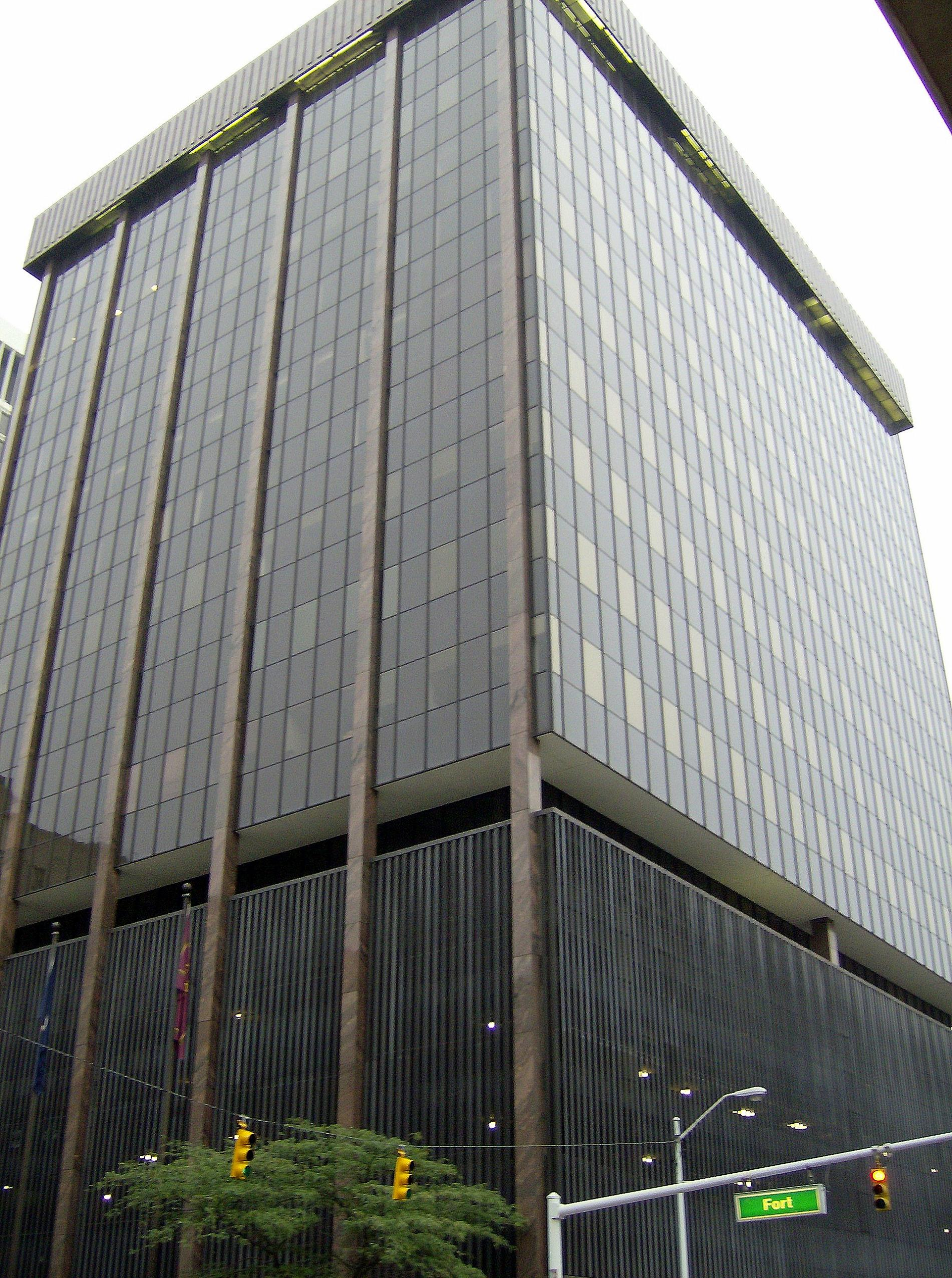
- Interactive map of the Fort Washington Plaza area

General information
- Type: Office
- Architectural style: International
- Location: 333 West Fort Street; Detroit, Michigan
- Coordinates: 42.3293°N 83.0499°W
- Completed: 1969
- Owner: Sterling Group

Height
- Roof: 194 ft (59 m)

Technical details
- Floor count: 16

Design and construction
- Architects: Louis G. Redstone & Associates

Fort Washington Plaza is located at the corner of West Fort Street and Washington Boulevard in downtown Detroit, Michigan. It occupies the entire block bordered by West Fort Street, Washington Boulevard, Cass Avenue, and West Congress Street. The high-rise office building stands 16 stories in height. It was built in 1969, and includes a parking garage. It was designed in the international architectural style. It uses mainly concrete and glass.

In May 2026, the building's owner, the Sterling Group, unveiled plans to demolish the building and construct a new hotel.
