= Lafayette Boulevard =

- Length: 10.76 mi (17.32 km)
- South end: Brest Street in Lincoln Park-Southgate
- Major junctions: M-39 in Lincoln Park; I-75 in Lincoln Park-Detroit; M-10 in Detroit; I-75 / I-375 in Detroit
- East end: Iroquois Street in Detroit

Lafayette Boulevard (also referred to as Lafayette Street and Lafayette Avenue) is a major east–west street through the city of Detroit, extending from the southeast side through downtown into the southwest side, ending at Woodmere Cemetery. Lafayette Boulevard, like certain other east–west streets that had ended in southwest Detroit east of Woodmere Cemetery, reappears in the suburb of Lincoln Park, Michigan. The stretch through downtown Detroit is lined with structures including the Detroit Free Press Building and Greektown Casino Hotel.

This list below shows the information on the buildings located along Lafayette Boulevard in the city of Detroit.

Address	Building Name		Building use	Year Built	Architectural Style	Floors	Notes
Address	South side of street	North side of street	Building use	Year Built	Architectural Style	Floors	Notes
Outer Drive
Woodmere Street
Springwells Street
Central Street
Green Street
Waterman Street
Livernois Avenue
Dragoon Street
Junction Street
Clark Street
Fairbanks Street
4020 West Lafayette Boulevard		Hotel Yorba	hotel	1923		4	
Hubbard Street
West Grand Boulevard
Fisher Freeway (Interstate 75)
Ambassador Bridge
Rosa Parks Boulevard
Trumbull Street
Lodge Freeway (M-10)
3rd Street
615 West Lafayette Boulevard	Detroit News Building		office building	1917	Romanesque	3	Houses the main offices of The Detroit News and Detroit Free Press
2nd Street
550 West Lafayette Boulevard		WDIV Studios	television studio			1	Houses the main studios of WDIV-TV.
525 West Lafayette Boulevard	Fort Shelby Hotel		hotel	1916	Classical Revival, Georgian Eclectic, Beaux-Arts	23	Expanded 1927, reopened 2008 as the DoubleTree Suites by Hilton Hotel Detroit Downtown - Fort Shelby
1st Street
411 West Lafayette Boulevard	411 Building		office building				Houses Comerica Bank's Detroit offices.
Cass Avenue
321 West Lafayette Boulevard	Detroit Free Press Building		office building	1925	Art Deco	16	former Detroit Free Press headquarters
Washington Boulevard
231 West Lafayette Boulevard	Theodore Levin United States Courthouse		courthouse	1934		10	
Shelby Street
144 West Lafayette Boulevard		Lafayette Building	office building	1923	neo-classical architecture	14	demolished 2010
751 Griswold Street	The Olde Building		lofts, restaurant	1927	neo-classical architecture	4	designed by Albert Kahn and Corrado Parducci
Griswold Street
Michigan Avenue
Randolph Street
Brush Street
1000 Brush Street		Atheneum Suite Hotel Detroit	hotel			8	
Beaubien Street
555 East Lafayette Boulevard		Greektown Casino Hotel	casino, hotel	2000		30	expanded 2008
Saint Antoine Street
Chrysler Freeway (Interstate 375)
Rivard Street
1300 East Lafayette Boulevard	1300 Lafayette East Cooperative		housing cooperative	1961		29	
Orleans Street
Dequindre Cut Greenway
Saint Aubin Street
Mount Elliott Street
East Grand Boulevard
Van Dyke Street
Iroquois Street
