= Industrial Building (Detroit) =

High-rise building in downtown Detroit, Michigan

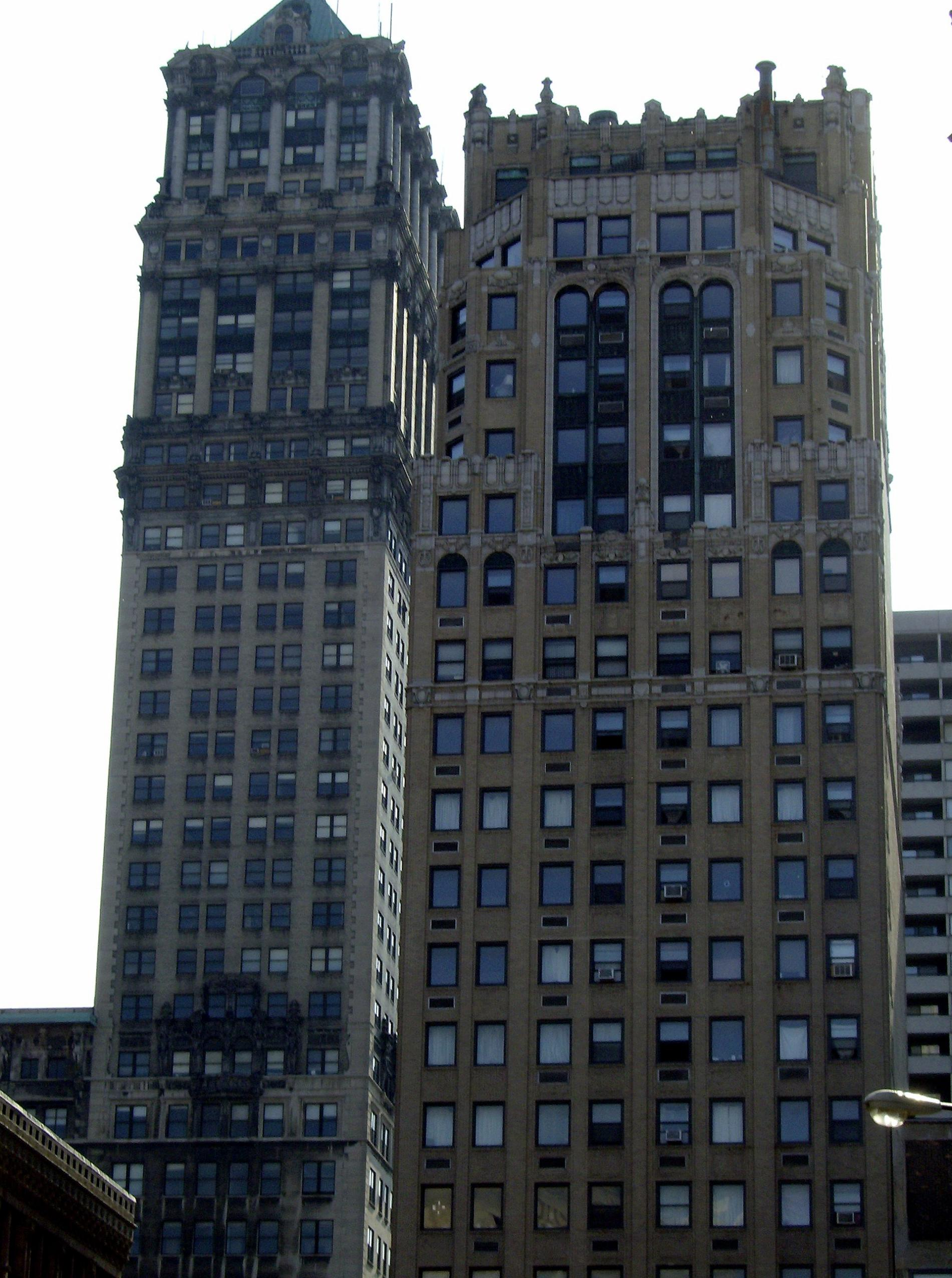
- Interactive map of the Industrial Building area

General information
- Type: residential
- Location: 1410 Washington Boulevard; Detroit, Michigan
- Coordinates: 42.3338°N 83.0505°W
- Completed: 1928

Height
- Roof: 73 m (240 ft)

Technical details
- Floor count: 22

Design and construction
- Architect: Louis Kamper

Other information
- Public transit: Times Square
- Industrial Building
- U.S. Historic district – Contributing property
- Part of: Washington Boulevard Historic District (ID99000338)
- Designated CP: March 18, 1999

The Industrial Building is a high-rise building located at 1410 Washington Boulevard in downtown Detroit, Michigan, within the Washington Boulevard Historic District. It occupies the northeast corner on Grand River Avenue and Washington Boulevard.

The building stands 22 storeys tall, with 21 above-ground floors, and one basement level. It was completed in 1928, and is one of the many structures built by architect Louis Kamper on Washington Boulevard in the 1910s and 1920s. Kamper designed the Industrial Building with a mixture of Art Deco, Gothic Revival and Beaux-Arts architectural designs. The upper stories feature several setbacks and piers, and the roof has an intricate design of limestone cornices.

Built as an office building, the tower was later converted to residential use and renamed the Park Place Apartments. A fire struck the building in February 2003, temporarily displacing over 100 residents.
