= Washington Boulevard Historic District =

Historic district in Michigan, United States

- U.S. National Register of Historic Places
- U.S. Historic district
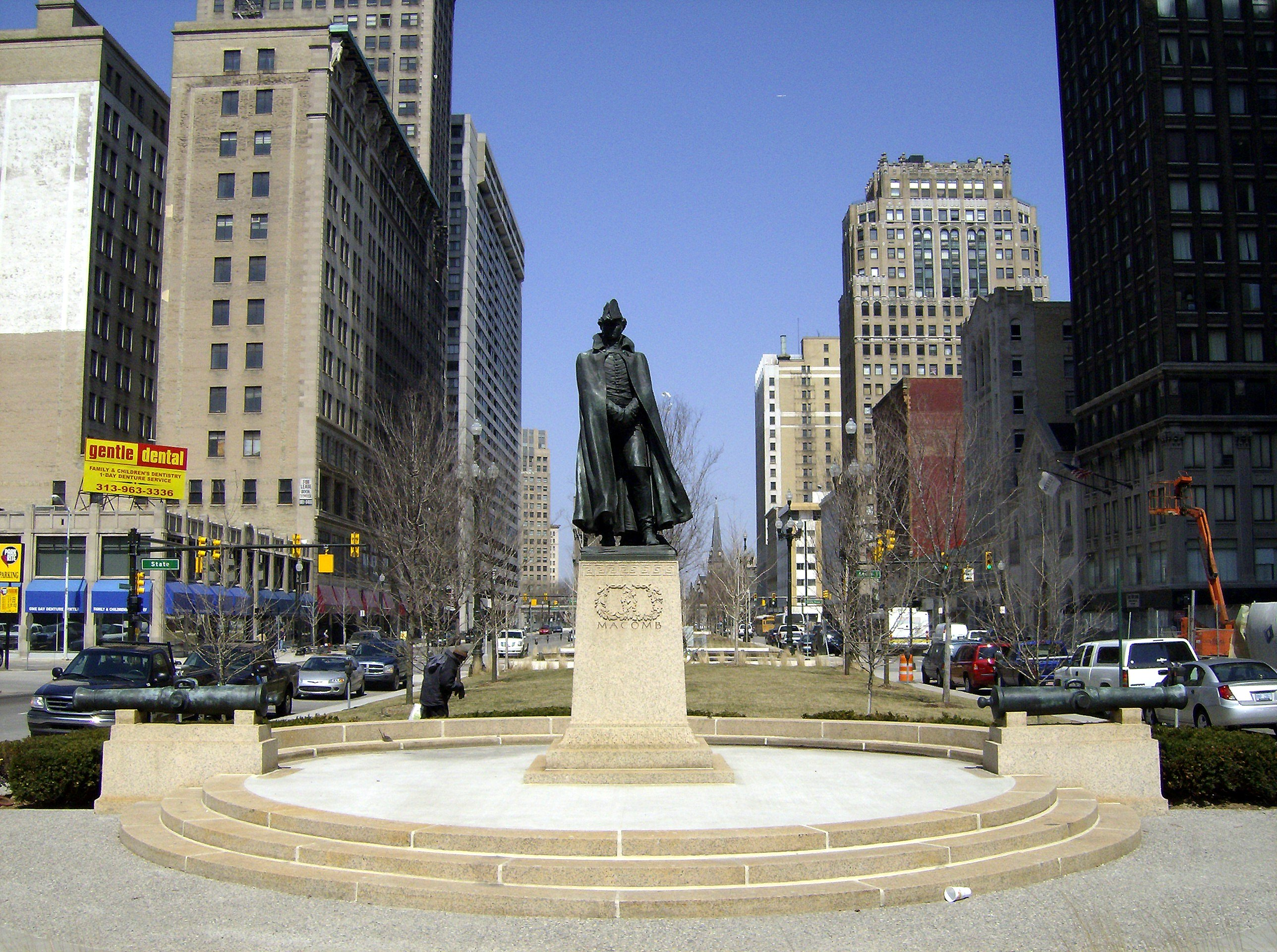
- Washington Boulevard looking north from Michigan Ave.
- Interactive map
- Location: Detroit, Michigan, U.S.
- Coordinates: 42.3394°N 83.0319°W
- Built: 1901-
- Architect: Edward H. Bennett; Louis Kamper; Hamilton Anderson Associates
- Architectural style: City Beautiful; Beaux-Arts; Renaissance Revival
- NRHP reference No.: 82002914
- Added to NRHP: July 15, 1982

Washington Boulevard Historic District is a multi-block area of downtown Detroit, Michigan. It consists of structures facing Washington Boulevard between State and Clifford Streets. In 1982, it was added to the National Register of Historic Places. It includes the Book-Cadillac Hotel, the Book Tower, the Industrial Building, and Detroit City Apartments among other architecturally significant buildings. Washington Boulevard is one of the city's main boulevards and part of Augustus Woodward's 1807-design for the city. Because Woodward's plan was never completed, the boulevard contains a sharp curve south of Michigan Avenue where it was connected to an existing street.

The street was broadened and ornamented in the early part of the 20th century. The development was inspired by the City Beautiful movement and financed by J. Burgess Book Jr. and designed by Louis Kamper. It was to resemble New York's Fifth Avenue and European boulevards. A sculpture lined park between two one-way streets decorated a shopping district and upscale residential neighborhood Edward H. Bennett, a well known master planner, turned Washington Boulevard into a Beaux-Arts streetscape.

In the late 1970s, Washington Boulevard was redesigned with an urban pedestrian mall that included new sculptures and an amphitheater. It has since been restored to its original plan.

== Gallery ==
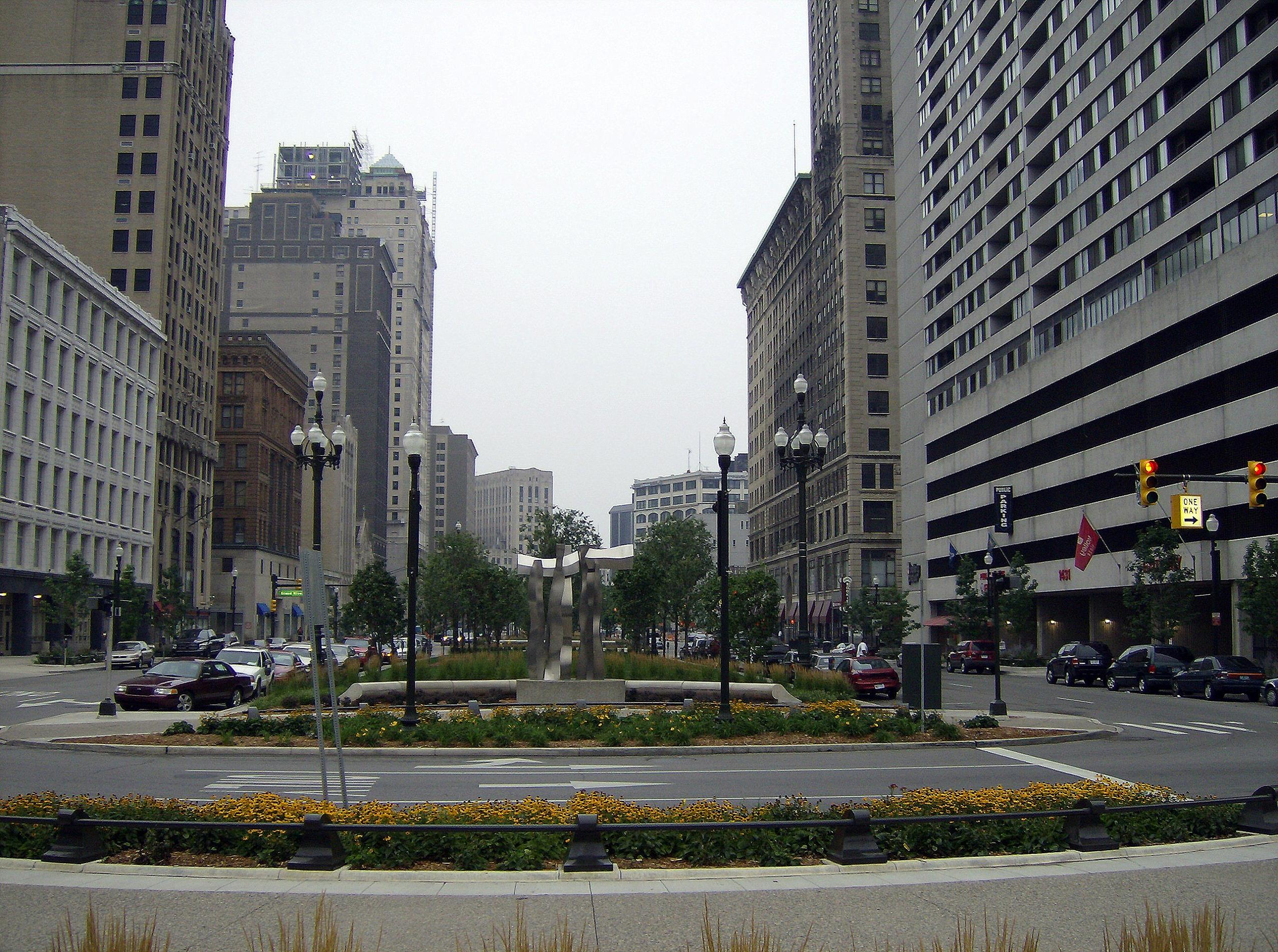
Washington Blvd. looking south from Clifford Street

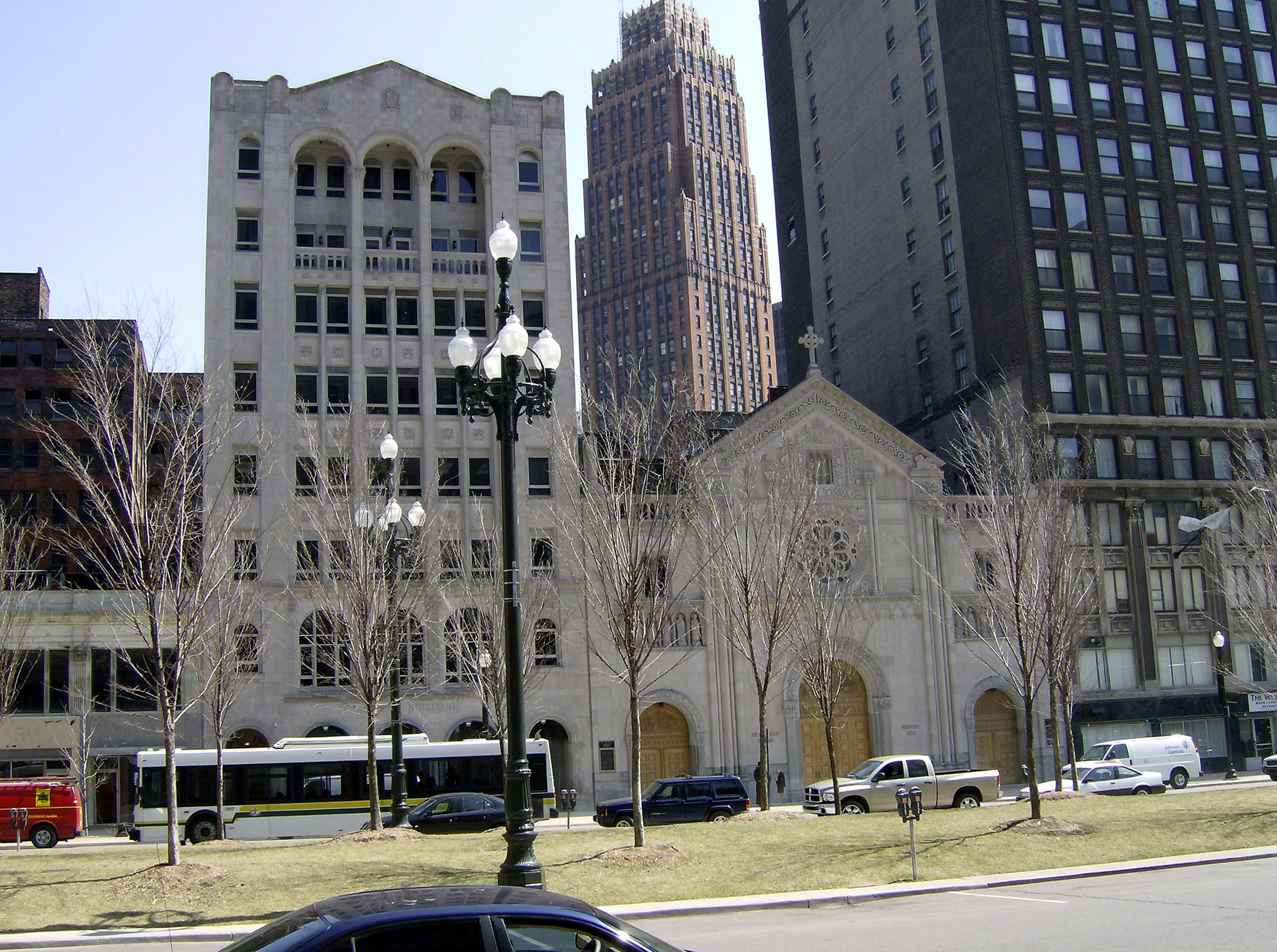
St. Aloysius Church and Chancery on Washington Blvd.

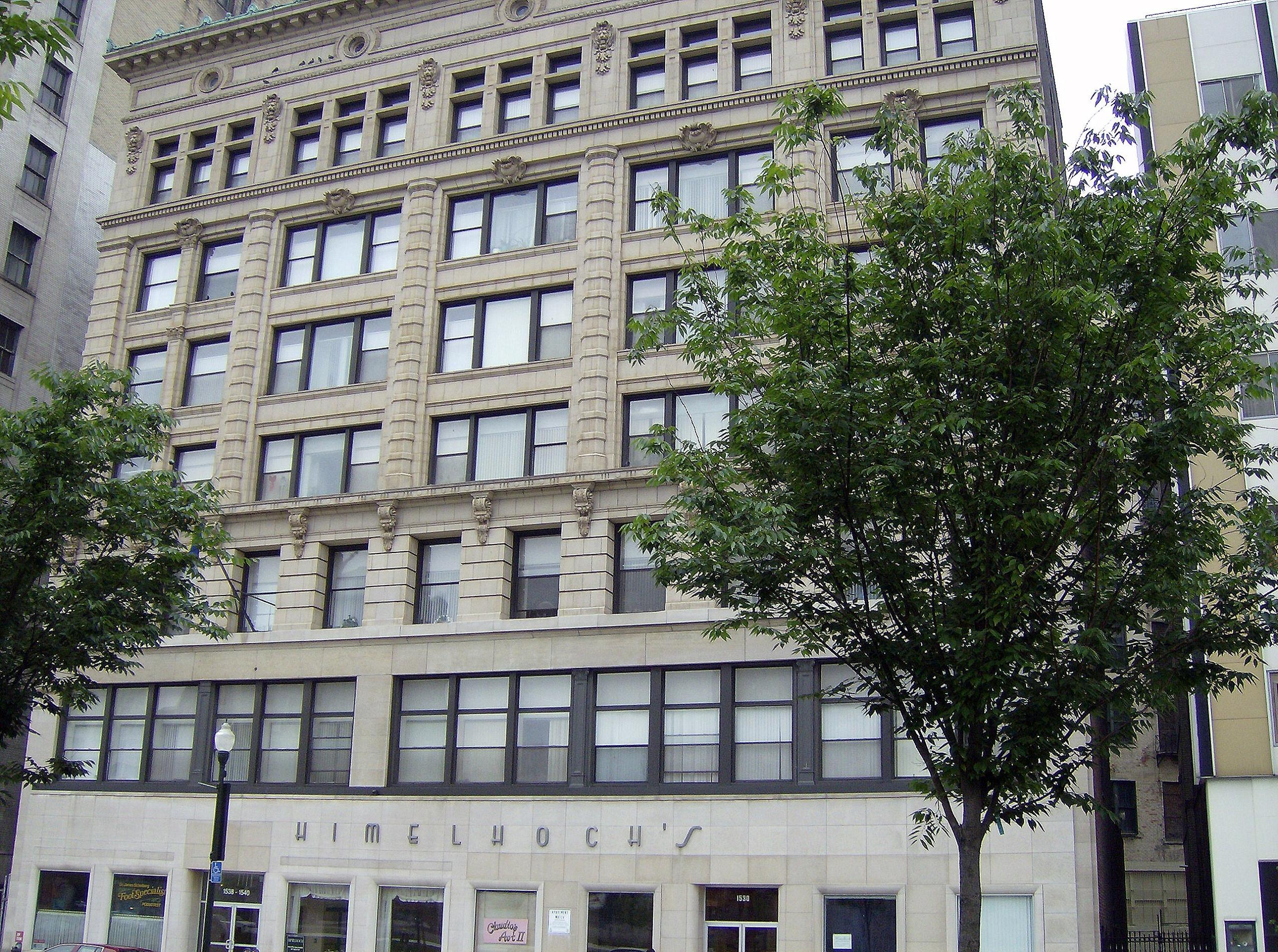
Himelhoch building

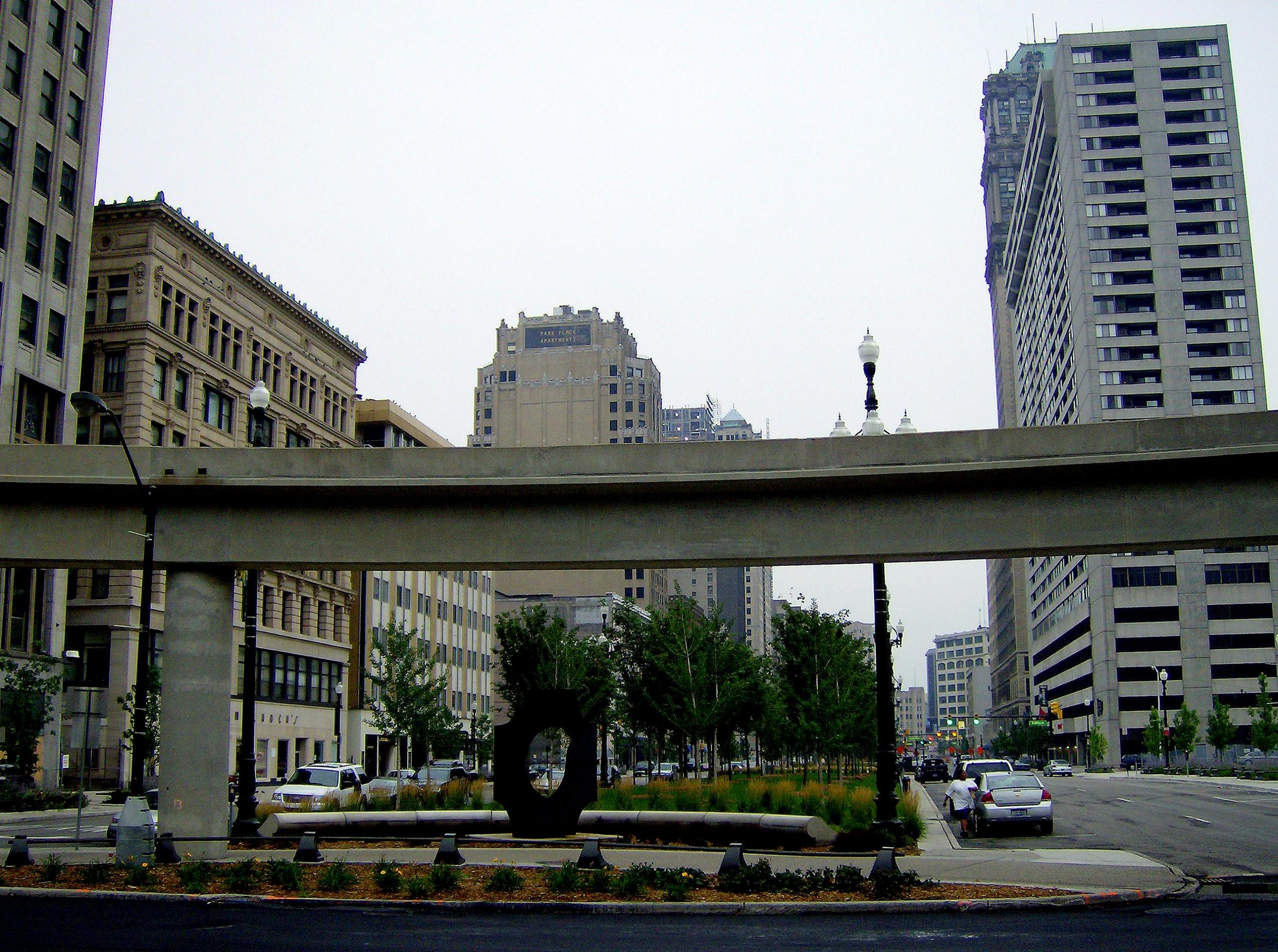
View from Grand Circus Park

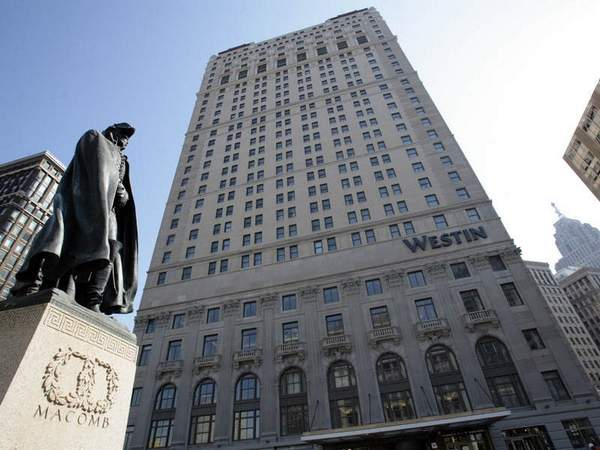
The Westin Book Cadillac Hotel is part of the historic district

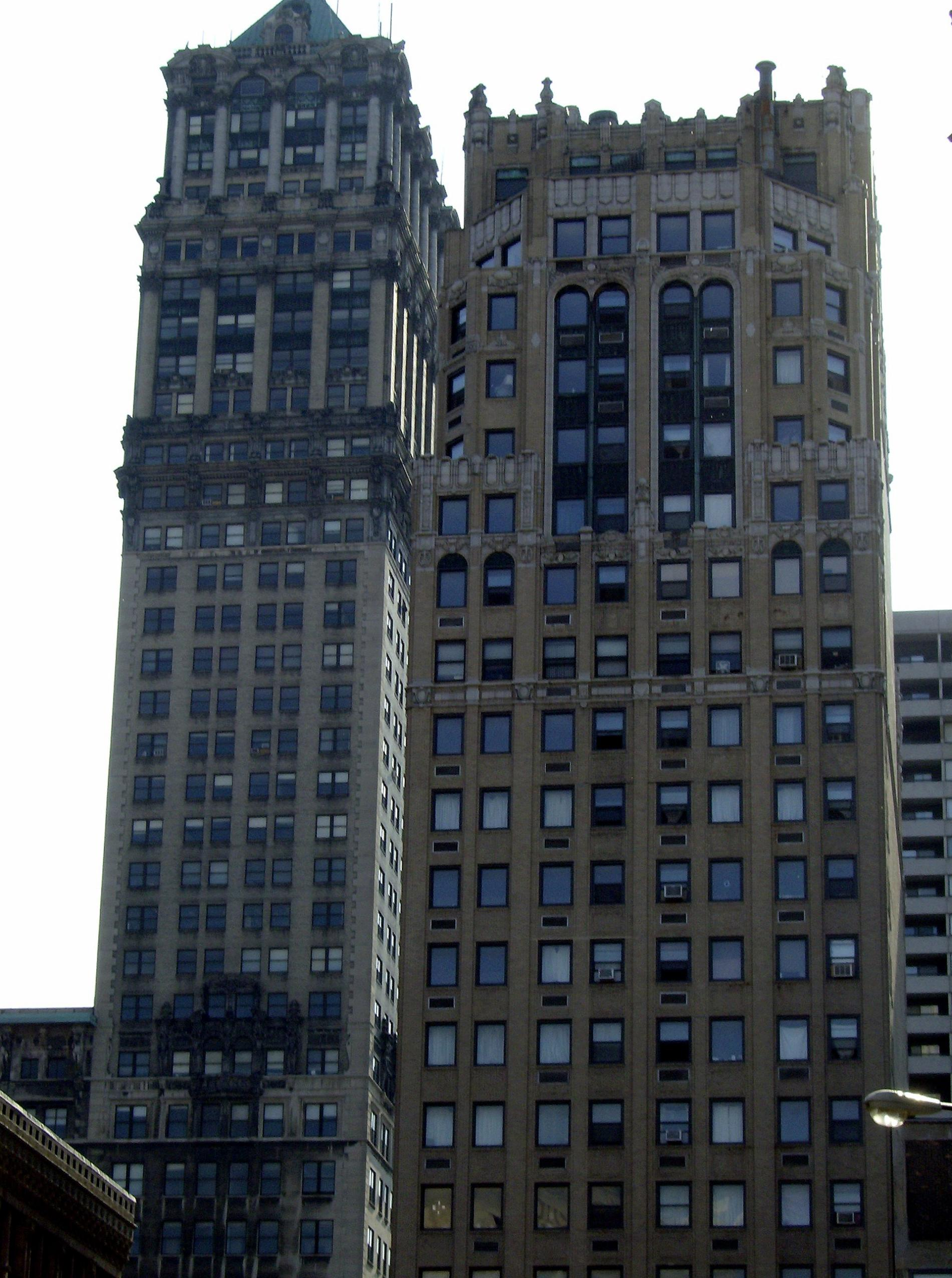
Industrial-Stevens Apartments, another 1920s-era building

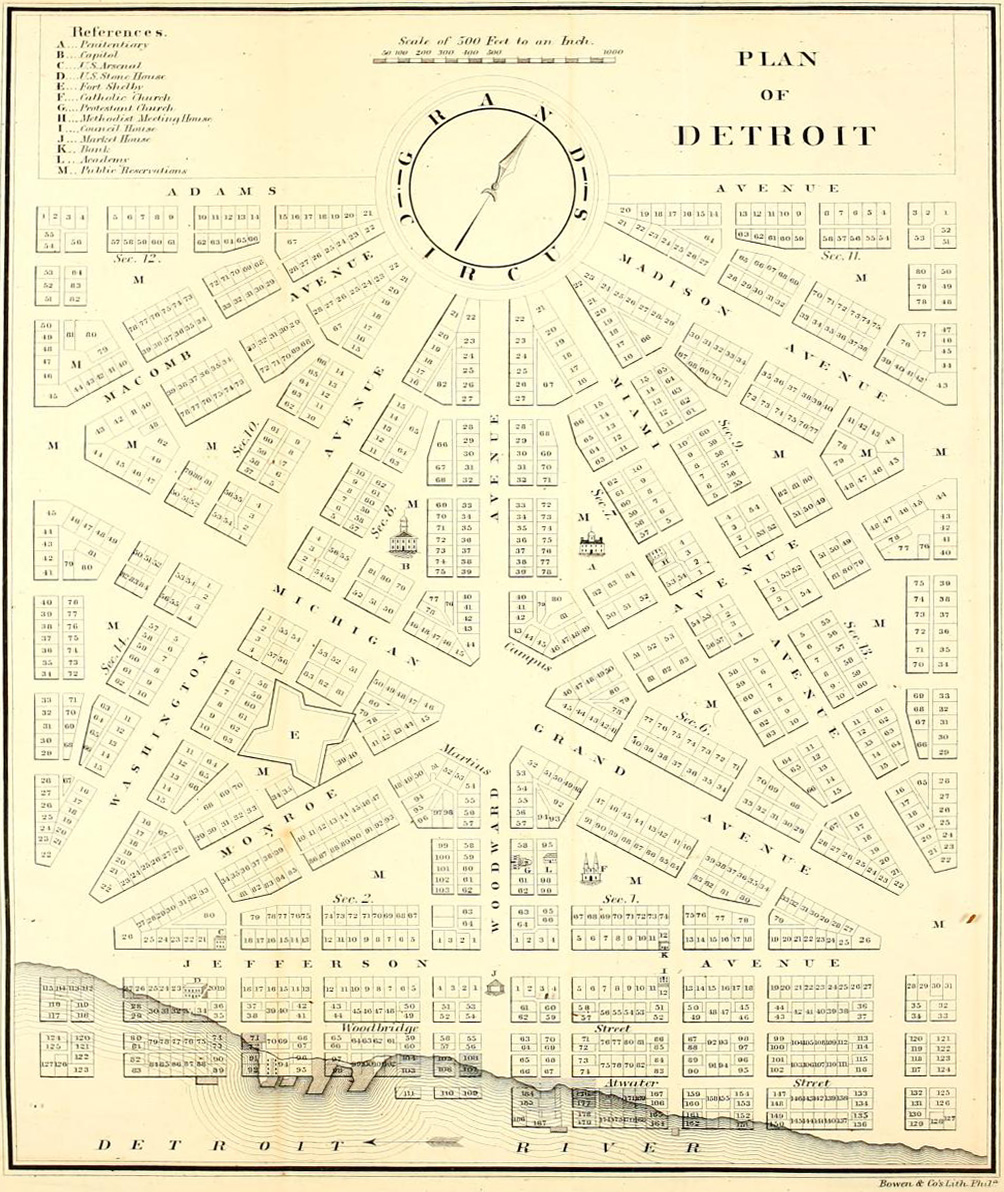
Augustus Woodward's plan following the 1805 fire for Detroit's Baroque-styled radial avenues and Grand Circus Park

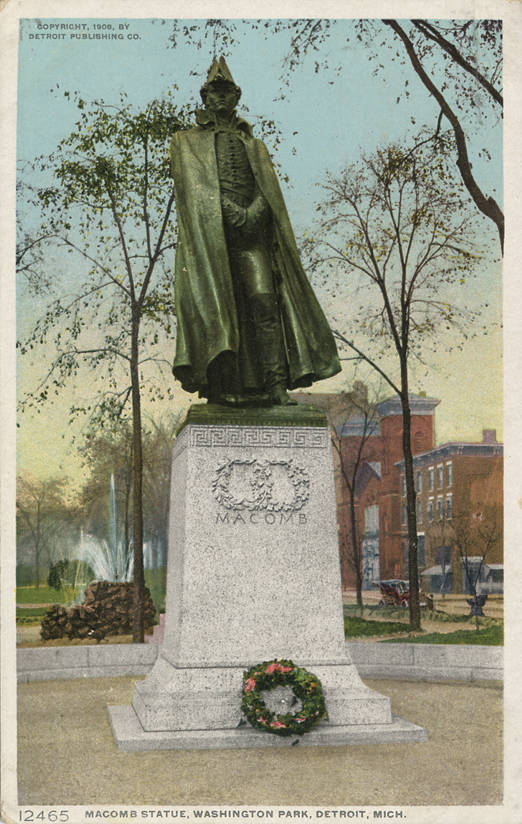
Statue of Alexander Macomb, at the intersection of Michigan Avenue

== Buildings ==
This list below shows the information on the buildings located along Washington Boulevard. This list starts at the Detroit River (south end), and heads northbound, terminating at Grand Circus Park.

Address	Building name		Building use	Year built	Architectural style	Floors	Notes
Address	West side of street	East side of street	Building use	Year built	Architectural style	Floors	Notes
Detroit River
Civic Center Drive
1 Washington Boulevard	Huntington Place		Convention center	1960	Modern	5	Expanded 1989, 2012 (expected completion 2015)
2 Washington Boulevard		Crowne Plaza Detroit Downtown Riverfront	Hotel	1965	Modern	25	Stands on the site of Fort Pontchartrain and originally known as the Hotel Pontchartrain; a second tower remains unbuilt
West Larned Street
250 West Larned		Detroit Fire Department Headquarters	Government (Fire Department)	1929		5	Former Detroit Fire Department headquarters, which relocated in 2013 to the nearby Detroit Public Safety Headquarters in a building that formerly housed the temporary MGM Grand Detroit casino.
243 West Congress Street		Marquette Building	Government and commercial	1905	Chicago school	10	Houses offices for the Michigan Secretary of State
West Congress Street
211 West Fort Street		211 West Fort Street	Office building	1963	Modern	27	Constructed as headquarters for Detroit Bank and Trust, later Comerica Bank
West Fort Street
231 West Lafayette Street		Theodore Levin United States Courthouse	Court House	1934	Art Deco/Art Moderne	10	
321 West Lafayette Boulevard	Detroit Free Press Building		newspaper	1924	Art Deco	16	Connected via a walkway on the third and fourth floors to the adjacent Detroit Club
West Lafayette Boulevard
1020 Washington Boulevard		Holiday Inn Express Detroit - Downtown	Hotel	1965	Modern	17	Stands at the site of "219 Michigan Avenue", one of Detroit's first high-rise skyscrapers.
305 Michigan Avenue	Gabriel Richard Building		offices	1915	Chicago school	10	Offices for the Catholic Archdiocese of Detroit
Michigan Avenue
1114 Washington Boulevard		Westin Book Cadillac Hotel	Hotel	1928	Neo-Renaissance	29	Reopened in October 2008
State Street
234 State Street		Washington Boulevard Building	Apartment building	1922	Chicago school	23	Constructed as offices and converted to apartments in the 1980s
1234 Washington Boulevard		St. Aloysius Catholic Church and Chancery Building	church and office building	1924	Romanesque Revival/Gothic Revival	7	Former offices for the Archdiocese of Detroit
1265 Washington Boulevard	Book Tower		Offices	1926	Academic classicism	40	
35 West Grand River Avenue		Clark Tower Lofts	Apartment building	1922	Chicago school	10	
Grand River Avenue
1410 Washington Boulevard		Industrial Building	Apartments	1929	Art Deco/Art Moderne	22	Constructed as office and converted into apartments in the 1980s
1420 Washington Boulevard		Julian C. Madison Building	Offices	1906	Chicago school	6	Home to the Gardner and Schumaker Furniture Store for many years and known as the Gardner-Shumaker Building
1431 Washington Boulevard	Detroit City Apartments		Apartment building with parking garage	1981	Modern	23	Constructed as Trolley Plaza Apartments because of the adjacent trolley line
Clifford Street
1514 Washington Boulevard		Claridge Apartments	Apartment building	1906	Modern	7	Constructed as the Michigan State Telephone Building and later renovated into apartments and refaced
1545 Woodward Avenue		Himelhoch Apartments	Apartment building	1901	Neo-Renaissance	8	The structure was originally built as an office and retail building and was later leased to upscale women's department store Himelhoch Brothers from 1923 to 1977
1539 Washington Boulevard	Detroit Statler Hotel		Hotel (demolished)	1915	Georgian architecture, a subset of English Renaissance Revival	18	Razed in 2005
1553 Woodward Avenue		David Whitney Building	Office tower	1915	Neo-Renaissance	19	Aloft Hotels branded hotel and apartments
Park Avenue
Grand Circus Park

== Sources ==
- Hill, Eric J. and John Gallagher (2002). AIA Detroit: The American Institute of Architects Guide to Detroit Architecture. Wayne State University Press. ISBN 0-8143-3120-3.
