= Detroit Statler Hotel =

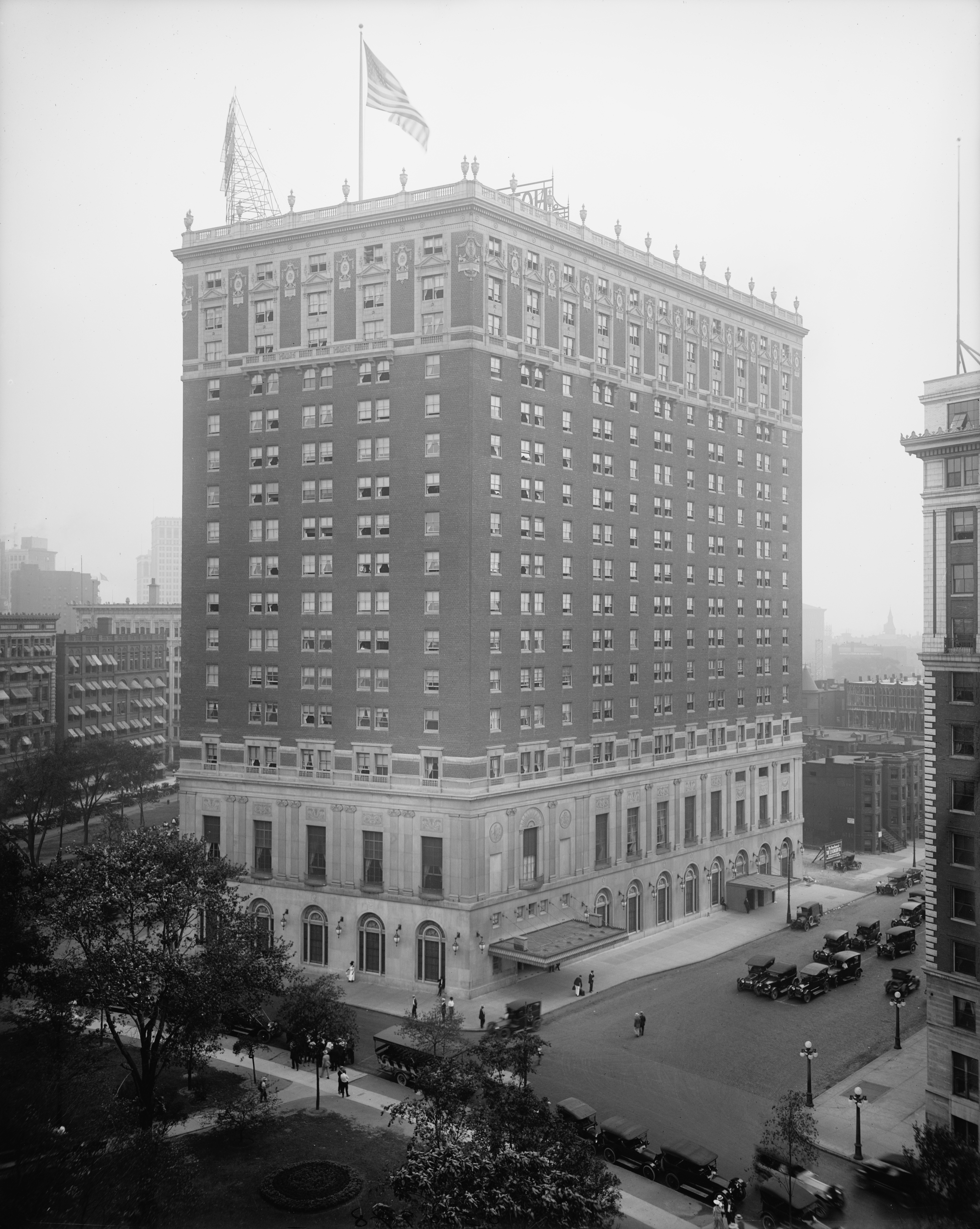
- Detroit Statler Hotel, c. 1915
- Interactive map of the Detroit Statler Hotel area

General information
- Status: Demolished
- Type: Hotel
- Location: 1539 Washington Boulevard; Detroit, Michigan
- Coordinates: 42.33542°N 83.05159°W
- Construction started: 1914
- Completed: 1915
- Opening: February 6, 1915
- Closed: October 15, 1975
- Demolished: 2005
- Cost: $3.5 million (equivalent to $80.7 million in 2024)

Height
- Roof: 70.7 m (232 ft)

Technical details
- Floor count: 18
- Floor area: 47,845 m^{2} (515,000 sq ft)

Design and construction
- Architect: George B. Post

The Detroit Statler Hotel (also known as the Detroit Hilton Hotel) was a building located at 1539 Washington Boulevard across from Grand Circus Park between the David Whitney Building and the Hotel Tuller in Downtown Detroit, Michigan. In addition to Washington Boulevard, the hotel also fronted Bagley Street and Park Avenue.

== History ==
The Hotel Statler was designed for Statler Hotels by George B. Post and Louis Rorimer in the Georgian architectural style, with English Renaissance Revival roots evident. It consisted of 18 floors: sixteen above grade and two basement floors. Construction began on the original 800-room portion in 1914 and was completed in 1915.

Harry Houdini stayed at the hotel in October 1926, during his last engagement at the nearby Garrick Theater.

The Statler chain was purchased by Hilton Hotels in 1954. The Hotel Statler was renamed the Statler Hilton in 1958, the Detroit Hilton in 1969, and then the Detroit Heritage Hotel in 1974 until it was abandoned in 1975. In 1977, the city of Detroit acquired the Heritage following a foreclosure action on back taxes, which were estimated at $300,000.

In August 2000, the building's structure required the onsite treatment of 750,000 gallons of PCB-contaminated water following demolition.

In May 2004, after sitting vacant for 30 years, the Statler Hotel was approved for demolition by the Detroit Historic District Commission in preparation for Super Bowl XL. In February 2005, workers began removing windows and interior structures, starting from the southside. In June 2005, the roof and upper floor of the adjacent five-story CARE Building (formerly AAA Building) caught fire, reportedly caused by stray welding sparks. By November 2005, most of the Statler Hotel was razed.

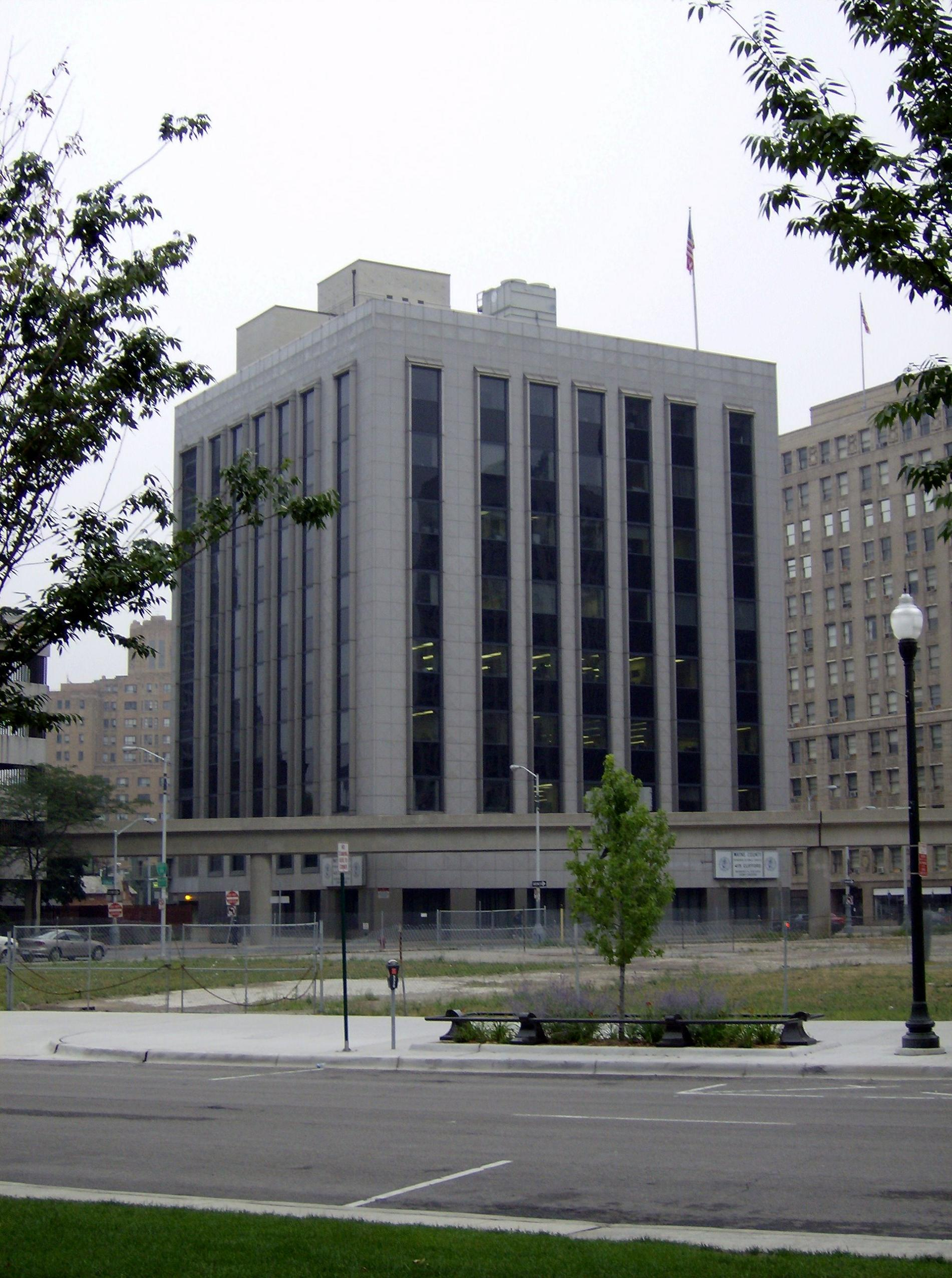
Vacant lot where the Detroit Statler Hotel once stood

== Site redevelopment ==
In November 1997, Trump Hotels and Casino Resorts proposed to build a casino at the Statler Hotel after Michigan voters approved a proposal a year earlier that allowed for as many as three casinos in Detroit. The bid was ultimately rejected.

In November 2007, Quicken Loans considered relocating its headquarters to the site of the former Statler Hotel, but ultimately decided instead to lease four floors of the Compuware Corp. building at Campus Martius due to the downturn of the commercial real estate market at the time.

On March 26, 2014, a 200-250 unit apartment building was announced to be built on the former site of the Statler Hotel. At the time of its proposal, this building would have been one of the first entirely newly constructed apartments in downtown Detroit since the early 1990s (excluding apartments built from converted offices). In October 2017, the newly branded, seven story City Club Apartments CBD Detroit broke ground, developed by City Club Apartments LLC. Upon its completion in June 2021, the building had 288 apartments and 13,000 square feet of retail space. Its tenants include Premier Pet Supply and the Statler Bistro, an homage to the former hotel. The building was renamed to CBD Detroit Apartments after City Club Apartments LLC ceased operations in August 2024.

== Facts ==
- A lawsuit by preservationists temporarily delayed the city's plans to demolish the former hotel.
- The hotel had proven so popular that a 200-room addition was added onto the back of the hotel along Washington Boulevard.
- According to the original blueprints, one of the penthouse roof levels lies at 226' above the street, and Sanborn Maps list the other at 232' above the street. The full structural height is unclear.
- The hotel was situated within six feet of the Detroit People Mover elevated railway.
- In 2013, Paramount Pictures created a set for Transformers: Age of Extinction on the site of the former Statler Hotel that was designed to look like Hong Kong.
