= Book Tower =

Skyscraper In Detroit, MI

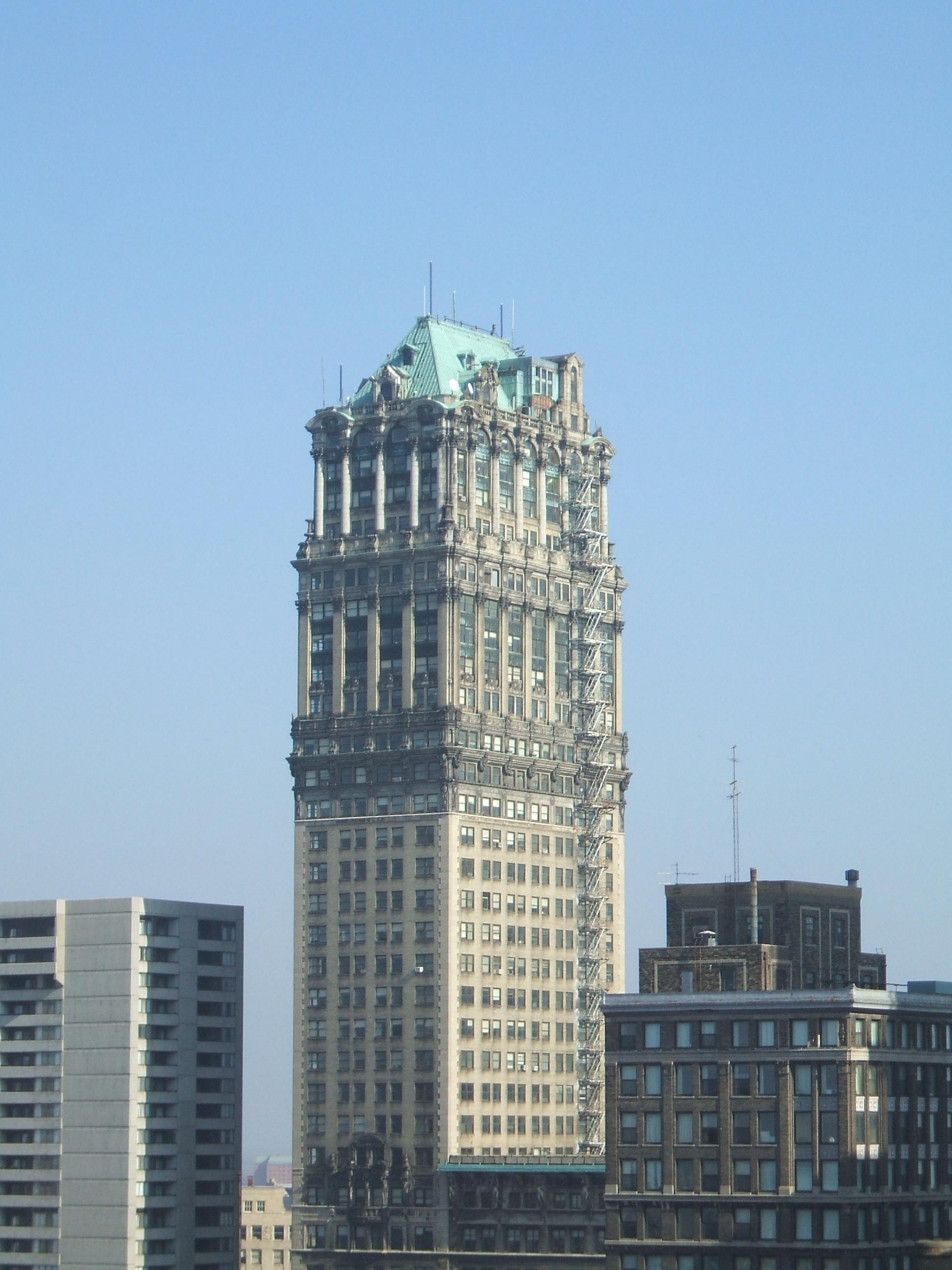
- The Book Building in October 2006
- Interactive map of the Book Tower area

General information
- Type: Commercial offices
- Location: 1265 Washington Boulevard; Detroit, Michigan
- Coordinates: 42.3334°N 83.0517°W
- Construction started: 1916
- Completed: 1926
- Renovated: 2015-2022
- Owner: Bedrock Detroit

Height
- Antenna spire: 152 m (499 ft)
- Roof: 144.78 m (475.0 ft)
- Top floor: 122 m (400 ft)

Technical details
- Floor count: 38; 2 below ground
- Floor area: 483,973 sf

Design and construction
- Architect: Louis Kamper
- Main contractor: Starrett-Dilks Company

Renovating team
- Architect: ODA Architecture
- Renovating firm: Bedrock Detroit
- Main contractor: Christman

Other information
- Public transit: Times Square; Rosa Parks Transit Center

Website
- booktowerdetroit.com
- Book Tower
- U.S. Historic district – Contributing property
- Architectural style: Neo-Classical and Neo-Renaissance
- Part of: Washington Boulevard Historic District (ID82002914)
- Designated CP: July 15, 1982

Book Tower is a 38-story mixed-use building in downtown Detroit, Michigan, United States, within the Washington Boulevard Historic District. Designed by Louis Kamper in the Italian Renaissance style, it was constructed between 1925 and 1926, as an addition to the original Book Building. It was originally an office building, and was the tallest building in Detroit at the time of its completion. Following an extensive restoration completed in the 2020s, it now contains residential apartments and a hotel.

== History ==
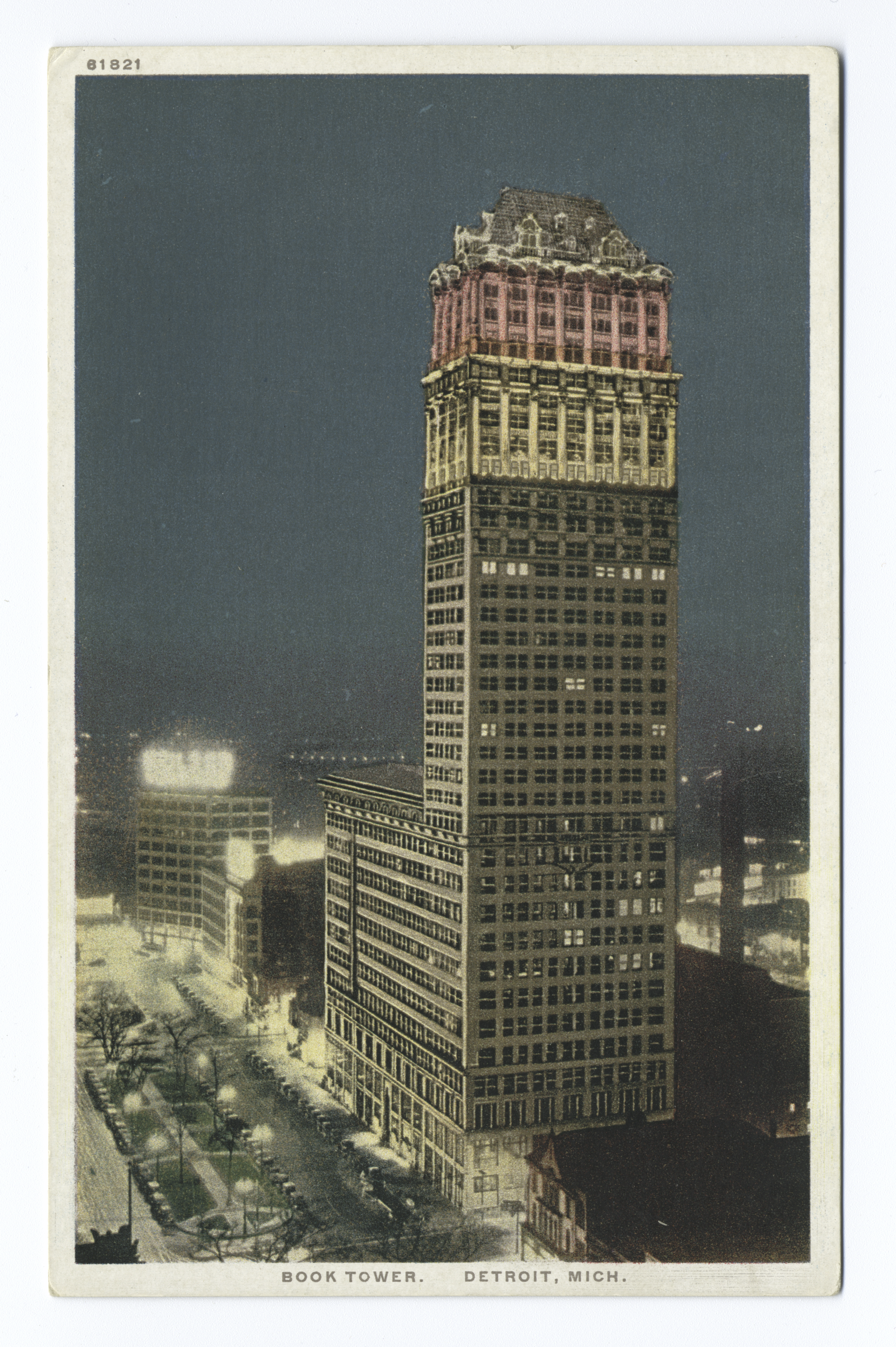
A 1920s postcard depicting the Book Tower

Louis Kamper designed 5 buildings in downtown Detroit for the Book family, including the Book Tower. Named for the famous Book brothers of Detroit who owned much of the property on Washington Boulevard, it was briefly the tallest building in the city from 1926 until the completion of the Penobscot Building in 1928. A taller Book Tower of 81 stories (designed to be the world's tallest building) was planned to be built at the opposite end of the Book Building, but was canceled during the Great Depression.

From its opening through the mid-1970s, the Book Tower remained a prestigious address on Washington Boulevard. Like many structures in the city, its fortunes declined until 1988 when the owners defaulted on the mortgage. In 1989, Travelers Insurance, the principal mortgage-holder, took possession and sold the building to developer John Lambrecht, who had previously purchased and renovated the Cadillac Tower a few blocks east. At that time, Lambrecht had plans to renovate the Book complex, including the Book Tower, similar to that of his Cadillac Tower renovation project. His untimely death later that year brought those plans to a halt.

Lambrecht's widow attempted to manage the property and made some improvements, but she was unable to maintain momentum. In July 2006, she sold the Book Tower to the Pagan Organization, a New York-based investment group. Pagan's plans were for a renovation and conversion of both the Book Tower and Book building into a mix of retail, residential, and office units. The Pagan Organization created the Northeast Commercial Services Corp. to manage the building. Northeast Commercial Services Corp. filed for Chapter 11 protection in May 2007, after defaulting on its mortgage loan. The last tenant, Bookie's Tavern, closed in January 2009, and moved to a new location downtown, leaving the entire building vacant.

In November 2009, Key Investment Group, based in nearby Clinton Township, announced intentions to buy and renovate the building as a mixed-use development with high rise residential units, office space, and retail. Weeks earlier, the investors revealed that they were looking to purchase the building from AKNO Enterprises of Vancouver for a green renovation. In January 2010, Rosemarie Dobek, CFO of Key Investment Group, reported that the group was pursuing plans for a US$320 million green renovation to include the Book Tower and four other Detroit buildings.

In August 2013, AKNO Enterprises filed a tax abatement for a future renovation of the building. Specific plans were not disclosed.

=== Renovation and modern use ===
In August 2015, Bedrock Detroit, owned by Dan Gilbert, purchased Book Tower for a reported $30 million, and soon began an extensive restoration and renovation project. Tours were given in 2019 and 2021 during the restoration, showing the progress of the project, and construction on the project was completed in 2022. Eran Chen's firm ODA Architecture led the restoration designs.

The restoration took seven years to complete and cost more than $300 million, and transformed Book Tower into a mixed-used building containing 229 rental apartments, a 117-room ROOST apartment hotel, commercial offices, and event space, with retail, bars and restaurants at ground level. Its grand re-opening took place in June 2023.

The restoration of Book Tower is one of the largest adaptive reuse projects in Michigan. Architectural Digest named Book Tower one of “The World’s 11 Most Beautiful Repurposed Buildings” in May 2023.

== Architecture ==
The building contains a cartouche by the Detroit architectural sculptor Corrado Parducci.

In August 2015, Bedrock Real Estate, owned by Dan Gilbert, announced it would purchase the Book complex, including the Book Tower. The purchase price was reported to be about $30 million. The building was renovated and restored into mixed-use retail, commercial and residential, and public tours were given in 2019 showing the progress of the project. The project was intended to be completed by 2022, and the building was reopened to the public in 2023.

=== Criticism ===
When completed, the building was tagged as a "somewhat unsuccessful attempt at a Beaux Arts skyscraper".

Kamper's Book Tower was critiqued for not including an internal fire escape route and thus necessitating a strange exterior fire escape, which, according to the Detroit Free Press, is one of the tallest external fire escapes in the world. He was also critiqued for choosing an absorbent limestone that sucked in the pollution of the contemporary factories' smoke.

== Gallery ==
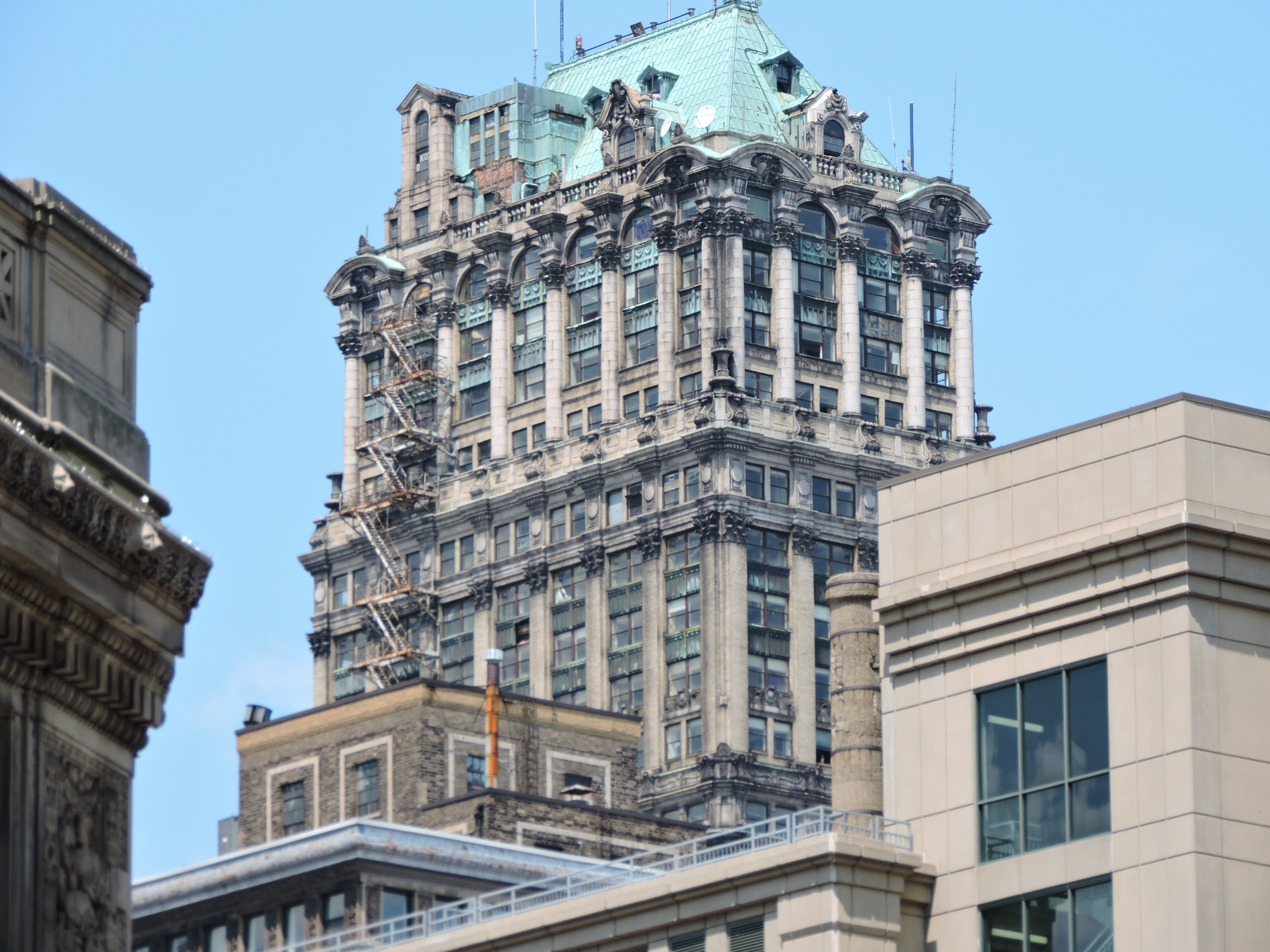

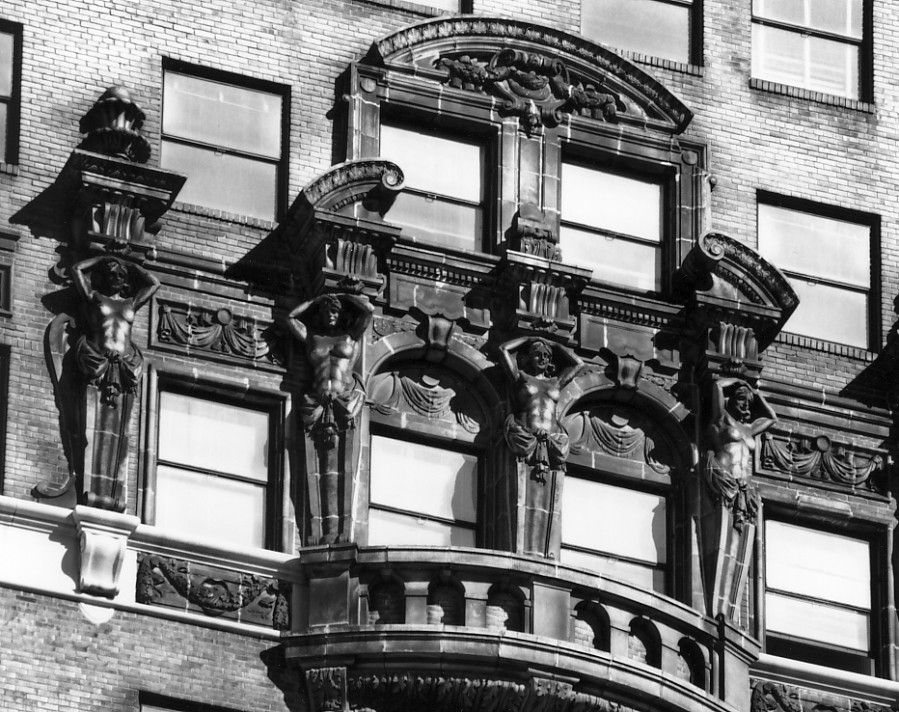
Caryatids by an unknown sculptor

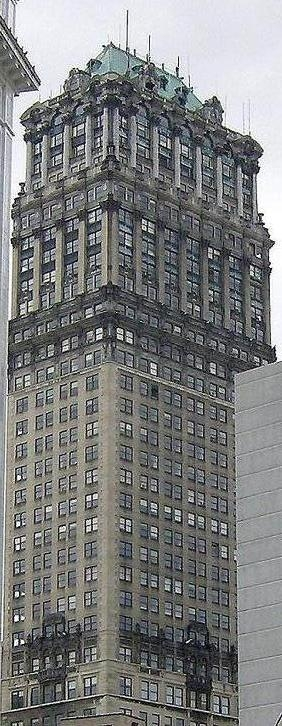
The tower from Woodward Avenue

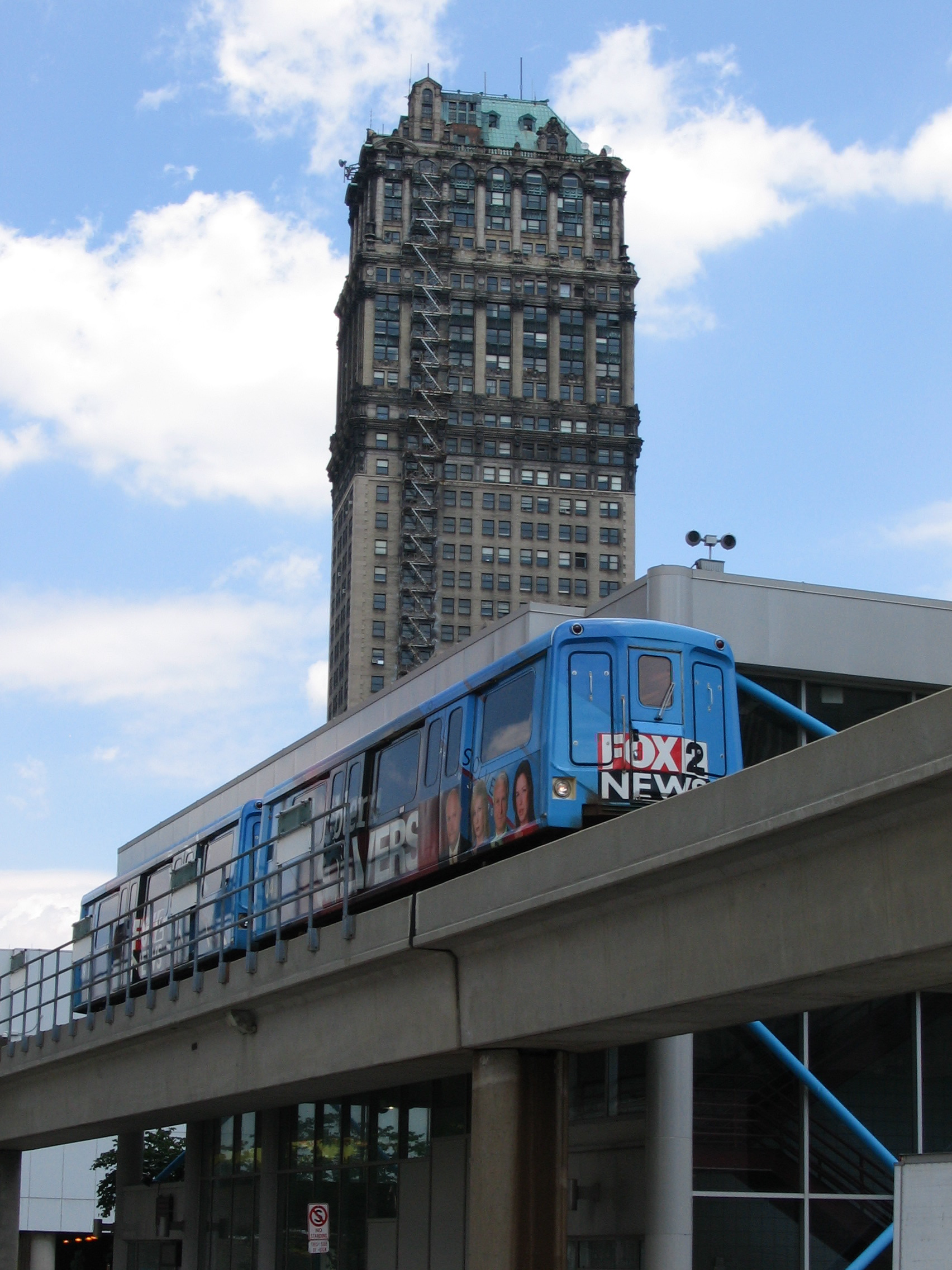
The Detroit People Mover approaching Book Tower

== See also ==
- List of tallest buildings in Detroit
- Washington Boulevard Historic District
- Westin Book Cadillac Hotel
