= Detroit City Apartments =

Coordinates: 42.33253°N 83.05359°W

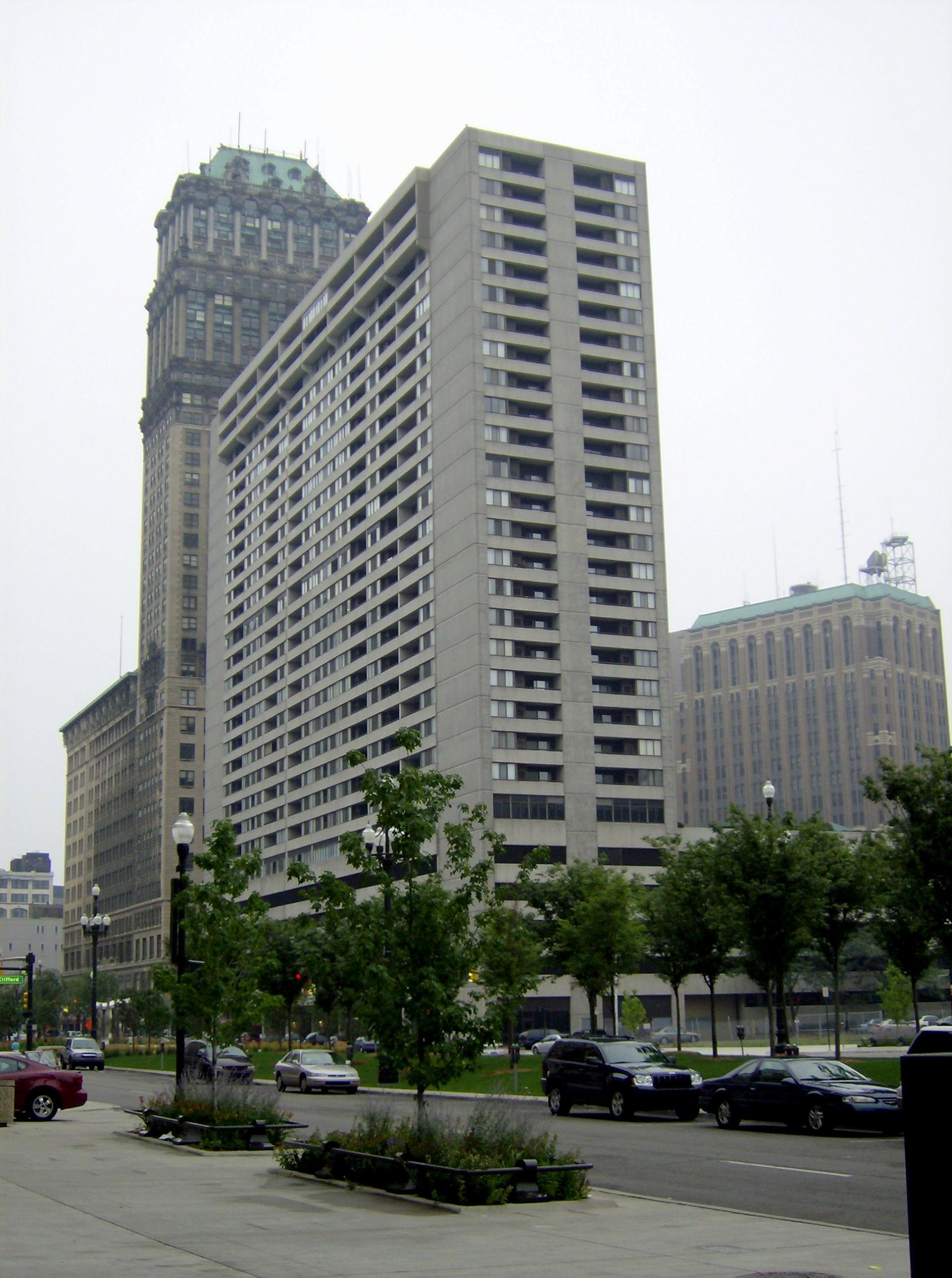
- View from Washington Boulevard in 2007
- Interactive map of the Detroit City Apartments area

General information
- Type: residential
- Location: 1431 Washington Boulevard, Detroit, Michigan, United States
- Completed: 1981

Height
- Roof: 81 m (266 ft)

Technical details
- Floor count: 28

Design and construction
- Architects: Jude T. Fusco Associates, Inc.

Other information
- Public transit: Times Square

Detroit City Apartments is a high-rise in downtown Detroit, Michigan. Completed in 1981 as Trolley Plaza, after the adjacent Washington Boulevard Trolley, the residential building stands 29 stories tall. The building is located at 1431 Washington Boulevard and occupies the block bordered by Clifford Street, Grand River Avenue and Washington Boulevard. In 2009, Village Green purchased the building and changed the name of the high-rise apartments to Washington Square. In 2013, Washington Square became the Detroit City Apartments.

The property consists of a 5-floor parking structure topped by 24 floors of residential apartments. The 6th floor, which extends out of the parking structure, includes the lobby, swimming pool, health club, dog park, and other amenities. Two-story, townhouse-style penthouse suites fill the 28th and 29th floors.

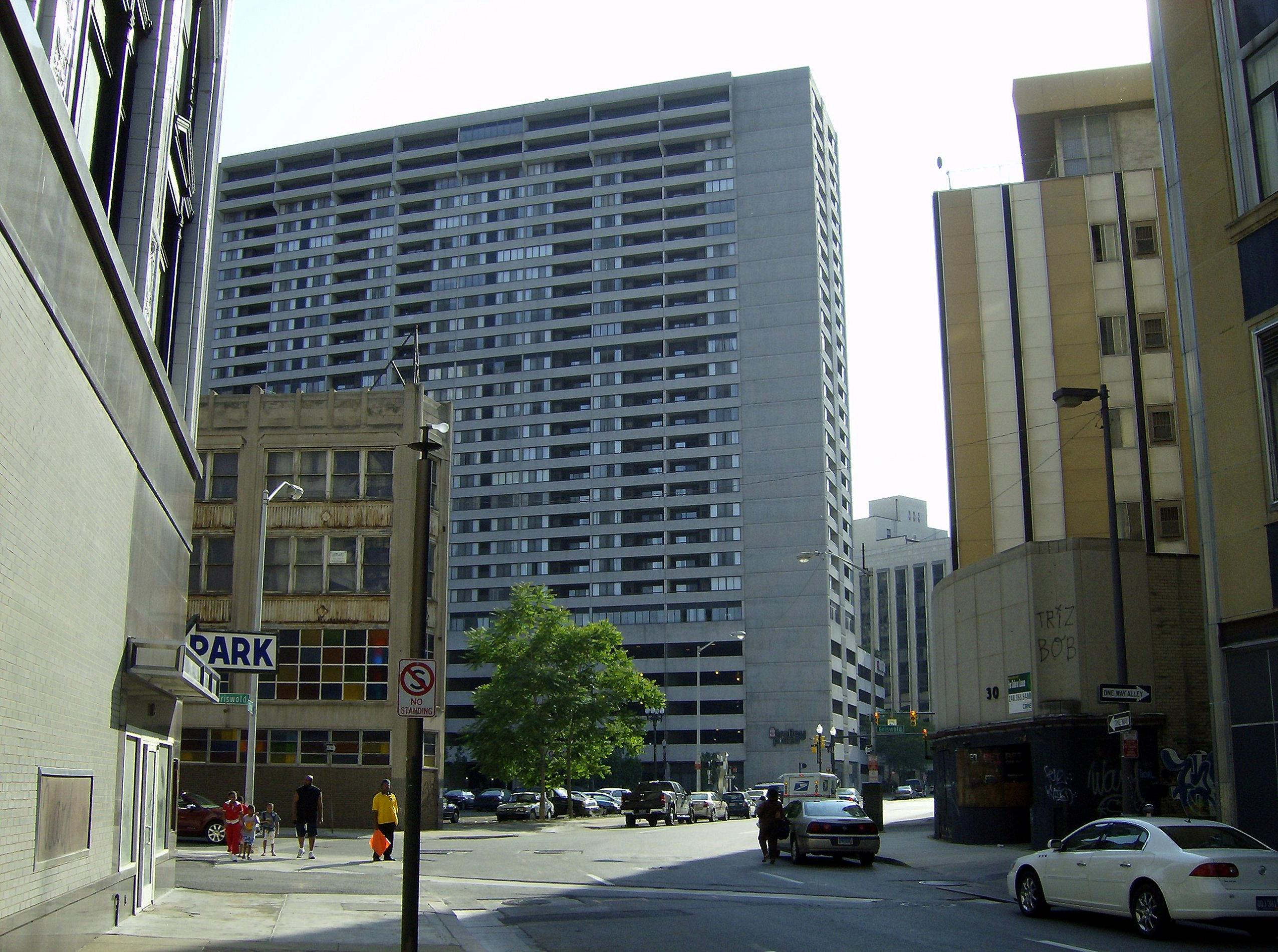
As seen from Woodward

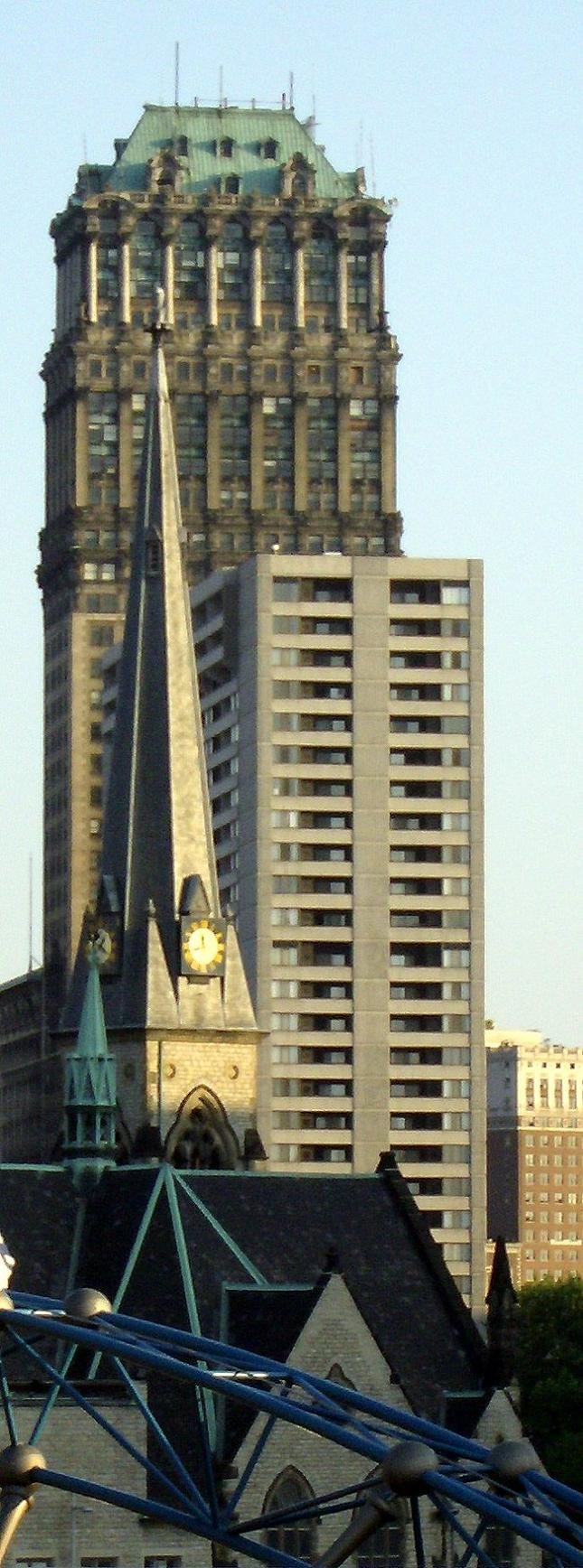
Central United Methodist Church spire and Washington Square under the Book Tower, with DoubleTree Fort Shelby Hotel in the distance to the lower right.
