= Planning and development in Detroit =

Planning and development in Detroit since the late 20th century has attempted to enhance the economy and quality of life of Detroit, Michigan, United States. In 1970, the private group Detroit Renaissance began to facilitate development in the city. Its successor, Business Leaders for Michigan, has continued to facilitate development into the 21st century. Projects have included new commercial facilities, revitalization of neighborhoods, hospitality infrastructure, and improvements to recreational and public facilities, such as the QLine light rail project.

== History ==
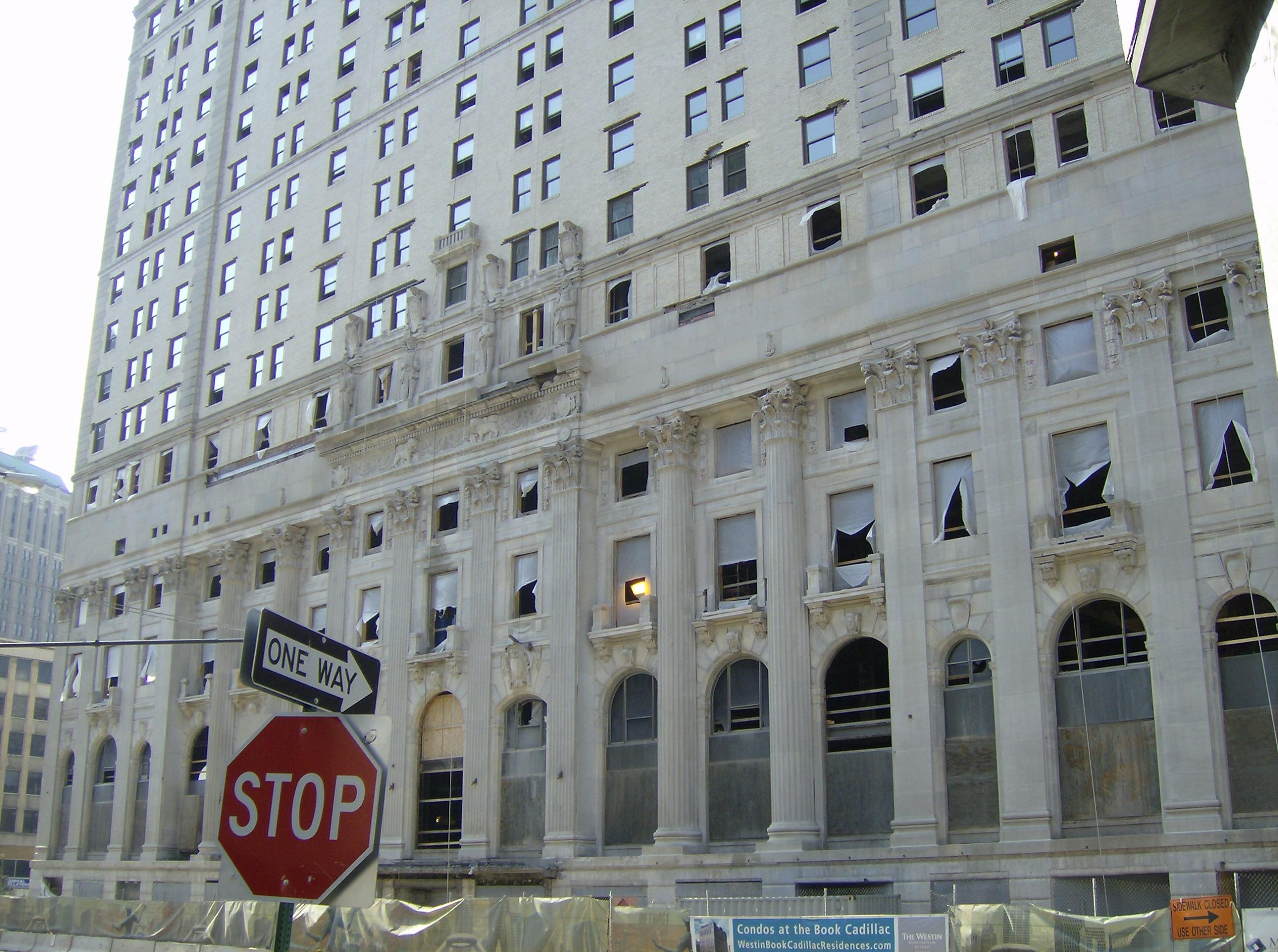
Restoration of the Westin Book-Cadillac Hotel

In 1970, Henry Ford II conceived of the Renaissance Center as a way to help the city retain residents who were moving to the suburbs. The group announced the first phase of construction in 1971. Detroit Mayor Roman Gribbs touted the project as part of "a complete rebuilding from bridge to bridge," referring to the area between the Ambassador Bridge that connected Detroit to Windsor, Ontario and the MacArthur Bridge, which connects the city with Belle Isle Park. He presented architectural renderings of "linked riverfront parks" from Renaissance Center to MacArthur Bridge, like a necklace, for public access.

The first Renaissance Center tower opened on July 1, 1976. Architects' initial design for the Renaissance Center focused on creating secure interior spaces, while its design later expanded to connect with the exterior spaces and waterfront through a reconfigured interior, open glass entryways, and a Wintergarden.

Late in 1973, Detroit elected its first African-American mayor, Coleman Young. During his administration, major developments completed included a combination of residential, retail, business, and retail projects: Renaissance Center, the Joe Louis Arena, the Detroit People Mover, the General Motors Detroit/Hamtramck Assembly Plant, Detroit Receiving Hospital, the Chrysler Jefferson North Assembly Plant, the Riverfront Condominiums, the Millender Center Apartments, Harbortown, 150 West Jefferson, One Detroit Center and restoration of the Fox Theatre.

Dennis Archer, a former Michigan Supreme Court Justice and mayor in the mid-to-late 1990s, supported a plan to add casinos as a catalyst for development in Detroit. Initially, his plan was for a casino cluster along the east riverfront. Ultimately, three large hotels with attached casinos were constructed in or near Detroit's downtown area: the Greektown Casino Hotel, the MGM Grand Detroit, and the Motor City Casino. In 2007, USA Today reported that the State of Michigan received more than $8.3 million yearly from Detroit's three casinos, and that in 2006 Detroit ranked fifth in U.S. casino markets with $1.3 billion in annual revenue. Archer also championed the construction of two new sports stadiums, Ford Field for the Detroit Lions and Comerica Park for the Detroit Tigers.

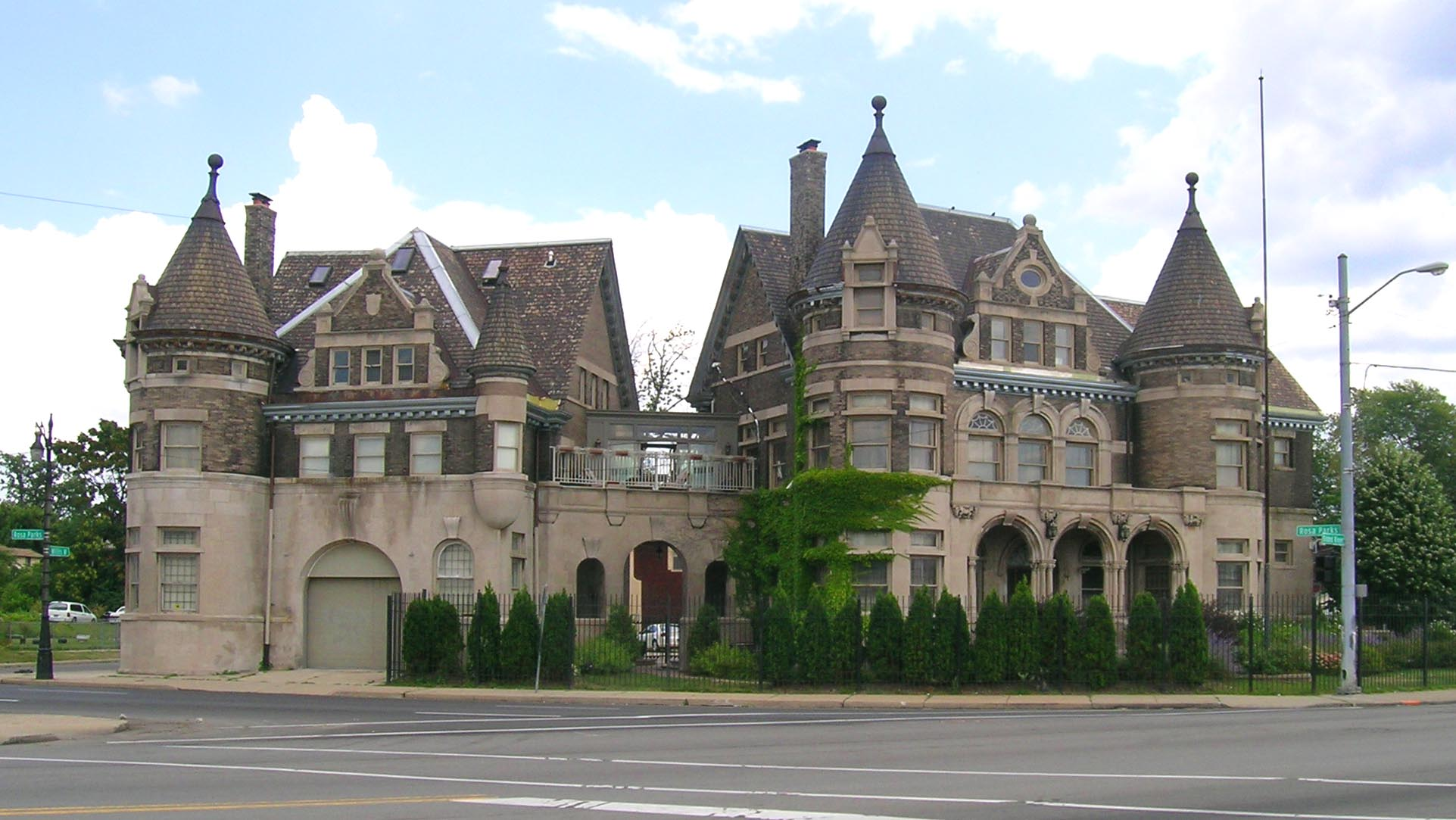
Offices of the Phoenix Group, a Detroit firm which participates in revitalizations

In June 2007, the Detroit Riverfront Conservancy, a 501(c)(3) organization, celebrated the first significant opening of new public space on the Detroit International Riverfront since its inception in early 2003. It has raised hundreds of millions of dollars to develop and manage Detroit's riverfront. The International Riverfront area ranges from the Ambassador Bridge to Belle Isle in downtown Detroit, encompassing a multitude of parks, restaurants, retail shops, skyscrapers, and high-rise residential areas along the Detroit River.

In 2009, Detroit Renaissance expanded its mission to address the need for regional economic development; the successor organization, Business Leaders for Michigan, is a group that gives thousands of dollars to Republican political campaigns. It is devoted to the creation of the Newt Gingrich-supported Michigan Turnaround Plan. Other participants in area revitalization efforts include the Detroit Riverfront Conservancy, the Detroit Economic Club, the Detroit Club, Cityscape Detroit, universities in the Detroit region, and the Michigan Economic Development Corporation, which has offices in the Cadillac Place state office complex in the city's New Center area.

In recognition of the city's architecture and historic significance, many of the city's buildings and districts have been listed on the National Register of Historic Places. They are eligible for federal historic tax credits for development. State tax historic tax credits are also available for qualified historic preservation.

== Initiatives ==
Some of Detroit's successful revitalizations include the New Center, Lafayette Park, East Ferry Avenue Historic District, Campus Martius, Grand Circus Park Historic District, and Washington Boulevard Historic District. In 2002, a major renovation of the historic Cadillac Place consolidated state offices from around the area into the city's New Center area. In 2003, General Motors completed a $500 million redevelopment of the Renaissance Center as its world headquarters.

The east riverfront promenade development for the Detroit International Riverfront was planned at $559 million, including $135 million from GM and $50 million from the Kresge Foundation. The city has completed major redevelopment of Campus Martius Park and Cadillac Square Park. The plans have produced new downtown stadiums and a rebuilt freeway system intended to showcase the city for Super Bowl XL. With $1.6 billion in construction projects in 2004, the rapid pace of development in the city prompted construction of a $30 million cement terminal. In 2007, Bank of America announced that it would commit $25 billion to community development in Michigan following its acquisition of LaSalle Bank in Troy.

For 2010, the domestic automakers reported significant profits, indicating the beginning of rebound. Between 2009 and 2010, Detroit ranked seventh in the nation for economic recovery. A study conducted in 2006 by the University of Michigan-Dearborn determined that, in addition to the roughly 18,000 employees at the Detroit Metropolitan Wayne County Airport, activity had generated an additional 14,500 jobs in Wayne County and another 70,000 statewide, primarily through firms such as hotels, restaurants, and rental car agencies. The study made the assumption that passenger traffic through the airport and economic activity in these service industries would increase on a 1:1 ratio.

The Wayne County Airport Authority saw the potential for growth in the air transportation sector almost a decade ago, and began a capital improvement plan for the airport. The three original terminals from the 1950s were replaced by two new state-of-the-art terminals that opened in 2002 and 2008, respectively. Other major infrastructure improvements have been made to the runways, cargo facilities, and the terminals themselves, with an eye toward increasing the airport's capacity. At the time, the FAA forecasted a 15.2% growth in passenger travel from 2005 to 2010, and another 12.8% increase from 2010 to 2015. It was projected that the construction projects themselves would create 4,470 jobs, with an additional 21,500 jobs statewide due to increased passenger traffic.

One major focus of the capital improvement plan was to enhance Detroit's international gateway. Total travel has grown due to a surge in international travel, and international flights continued to increase before the recession negatively affected such flights at many airports.

Currently, initiatives have started to go beyond just improving the infrastructure and economy of Detroit. Policymakers are seeking to enhance the environmental well-being of their constituency. The city is allocating much of its budget in the coming years to lowering utility bills, creating more purified indoor air spaces by upgrading and repairing homes and appliances, and increasing access to sustainable and reliable transportation. This is being done with the intention of improving the expected welfare experienced by Detroiters. Green infrastructure is as well an initiative Detroit has included in their 2019 Sustainability Plan. Transitioning to more clean energy and green infrastructure not only helps subdue the negative impacts of climate change on the vulnerable and very polluted city, but it also helps Detroit's community, economy, and overall sustainability.

Detroit's Climate Strategy started in 2007 and has been worked on continuously ever since to build efforts towards sustainability. Multiple efforts combined with monetary incentives for enhancing Detroit’s infrastructure to be more green includes the 2010 $9.5 billion towards energy efficiency and upgrades in 19 different buildings, the 2016 citywide switch to LED streetlights opposed to high-pressure sodium (HPS) lights, the 2018 $3 million on green stormwater infrastructure, and lastly ending with the creation of the 2019 Sustainability Action Agenda Plan that updates every 4 years. The main goals of this action plan are centered on mitigation targeting greenhouse gas emissions and resilience for adapting to climate related issues such as floods, power outages and extreme heat.

Some other economic development initiatives in Detroit include the following:

- The Detroit Office of Targeted Business Development is also working to "utilize the City's enormous buying power to re-circulate Detroit dollars within the local economy as many times as possible and to work collaboratively with other City agencies such as the Mayor's Office of Neighborhood Commercial Revitalization (ONCR), with the ultimate goal of building and sustaining both the commercial infrastructure and the residential neighborhoods, thus transforming the Next Detroit." This includes facilitating the startup and growth of Detroit-based, women-owned businesses; Detroit-based minority-owned businesses; and Detroit-based small businesses.
- The Michigan Small Business Technology Development Center works to strengthen companies, create new jobs, retain existing jobs, and assist companies in defining their path to success.
- The Detroit Economic Growth Corporation (DEGC) manages major economic development initiatives on behalf of the City of Detroit, including transforming the East Riverfront District, developing the I-94 Industrial Park, managing the Lower Woodward Improvement Program, and creating the Paradise Valley Cultural and Entertainment District. The DEGC also provides staff services to Detroit's public development authorities.
- The City of Detroit Downtown Development Authority supports private investments and business growth within Detroit's central business district with loans, sponsorships and grants, capital improvements to public infrastructure, and other programs that increase economic activity.
- The Detroit Brownfield Redevelopment Authority (DBRA) to promote revitalization of environmental clean-up areas within the boundaries of the City of Detroit. The DBRA has approved over 160 brownfield plans, which are expected create $6 billion in new investments, 13,000 jobs, and over 9,000 housing units.
- The Economic Development Corporation of the City of Detroit assists local industrial and commercial enterprises to strengthen and revitalize the city and state economy through a loan program, public infrastructure improvements, and other programs.
- The Office of Neighborhood Commercial Revitalization (ONCR) has created a system of support services and strategies to targeted commercial strips, incorporating technical assistance and training, grants, and loans to address local business development. Some programs from the ONCR include Re$tore Detroit, ReFresh Detroit, and Small Business Detroit! Microloan, all of which provide financial support and assistance.
- The Michigan Works! System is the first unified workforce development system in the country and an instrumental partner for developing Michigan's economic future. The system comprises twenty-five agencies that focus on innovative, proactive solutions to meet the demands of a rapidly changing economy.

Some experts believe that Detroit needs to utilize the region's rich automotive history to break into new industries, such as battery technology, hybrid vehicles, and the auto parts industry, along with auto assembly. Other experts believe that Detroit's geographic location next to Canada provides a unique opportunity for trade and organizational growth. For example, Detroit's Wayne State University and the University of Windsor, Canada host an annual business symposium in order to tap into this strategic advantage and expand cross-border partnerships between Detroit and the Windsor region.

Quality of life initiatives, including the revitalization of parks, residential units, new construction, and historic renovations are at the forefront of the city's plan to accelerate redevelopment across the city. For instance, in 2004, the city added hundreds of new residential units to its downtown area. From 2000 to 2007, the city saw continuous annual increases in tax revenues from its casinos with the city estimated to collect $178.25 million in casino taxes alone for 2007, with the casino resorts opening in 2008.

=== Urban infrastructure ===
In October 2013, approval was given to John Hantz, a successful financial consultant in Detroit, who is devoting $30 million of his own funding to create Hantz Farms, a commercial urban forestry initiative; Hantz Woodlands, an urban tree farm project; and redevelopment of a blighted Detroit residential area covering nearly 180 acres on the city's east side. The Hantz project area is bordered by Van Dyke on the west, St. Jean on the east, Mack Avenue on the north and Jefferson on the south.

On December 6, 2013, bankruptcy judge Steven Rhodes approved a $210 million financing arrangement for overhauling the city's antiquated lighting system.

On December 13, 2013, the Public Lighting Authority (PLA) completed the initial sale of $60 million in bonds, part of a $210 million, two-step bond issue, to finance the purchase of up to 50,000 LED street lights. The new 150 watt LED lights are longer-lasting, are more than twice as bright as the old 70 Watt sodium lights, and are more affordable to operate. The goal was to have the installation completed in all neighborhoods by the end of 2015, and underground wiring of the thoroughfares done by the end of 2016.

On June 12, 2014, Detroit's Public Lighting Authority, created to take up fixing nonworking streetlights throughout the city, said that it would borrow $185 million in bonds, $20 million more than it initially had planned, after Standard & Poor's graded the agency's credit risk as relatively low, and compared with that of the bankrupt city. The sale of these bonds means an additional 15,00 lights will bring the total number of new LED street lights to 64,500.

On July 20, 2014, Olympia Development announced a three-year development plan, starting in September 2014. The centerpiece of the plan is the construction of a new $863 million Little Caesars Arena, and concurrently with another $200 million in apartments, restaurants, office buildings, parks and shops over 45-50 blocks of Downtown and Midtown areas, creating a new sports and entertainment district, known as "The District Detroit". Additionally, Olympia is now promising to spend "tens of millions" more for infrastructure improvements in the district, mainly around Cass Park, west of the arena site to create a new mixed-use neighborhood. Plans include a new 130 to 170-room hotel north of I-75 at Henry and Woodward that likely would be a third-party development. All together, the area stretches from Charlotte Street, the street north of Temple Street, south to Grand Circus Park, east to the existing stadiums, and to a northwestern boundary abutting the MotorCity Casino Hotel in North Corktown.

On July 28, 2014, M-1 Rail officially started construction. The streetcar line will stretch from downtown Detroit to the Amtrak rail station in New Center, continuing to just north of Grand Boulevard. There will be 20 stations serving 12 stops, with most of the stations being curbside on either side of Woodward Avenue going uptown or downtown, but changing to center road stations at the north and south ends of the system. The streetcar line was expected to be operational by mid-2017.

On October 13, 2015, Wayne State University opened its new $92 million, 207,000-square-foot Integrative Biosciences Center (IBio). As many as 500 researchers and staff will work out of the IBio Center located at 6135 Woodward Avenue.

On May 3, 2016, M-1 Rail announced the opening of the Penske Tech Center, which will serve as its headquarters, operations center, and streetcar maintenance facility, located just north of Grand Boulevard on Woodward Avenue in New Center.

On March 14, 2016, the Michigan Humane Society opened its new and expanded $15.5 million animal care campus on five acres, which includes a 35,000-square-foot, state-of-the-art veterinary facility, located just east of New Center at 7887 Chrysler Drive near Clay Street. The society said the larger facility will enable it to expand its teaching and training opportunities with Michigan State University's College of Veterinary Medicine.

On December 5, 2016, the Henry Ford Health System announced the start of a second development beginning in the spring of 2017 on its evolving 300-acre South Campus site in New Center, with the construction of a new $150–160 million, 187,000-square-foot, six-story Brigitte Harris Cancer Pavilion, scheduled to open in early 2020, along with a skywalk across West Grand Boulevard to connect it to the Henry Ford Hospital.

Detroit also plans both public and private redevelopment of Brush Park, the Brewster Recreation Center, and the nearby Eastern Market site.

=== Neighborhood revitalization ===
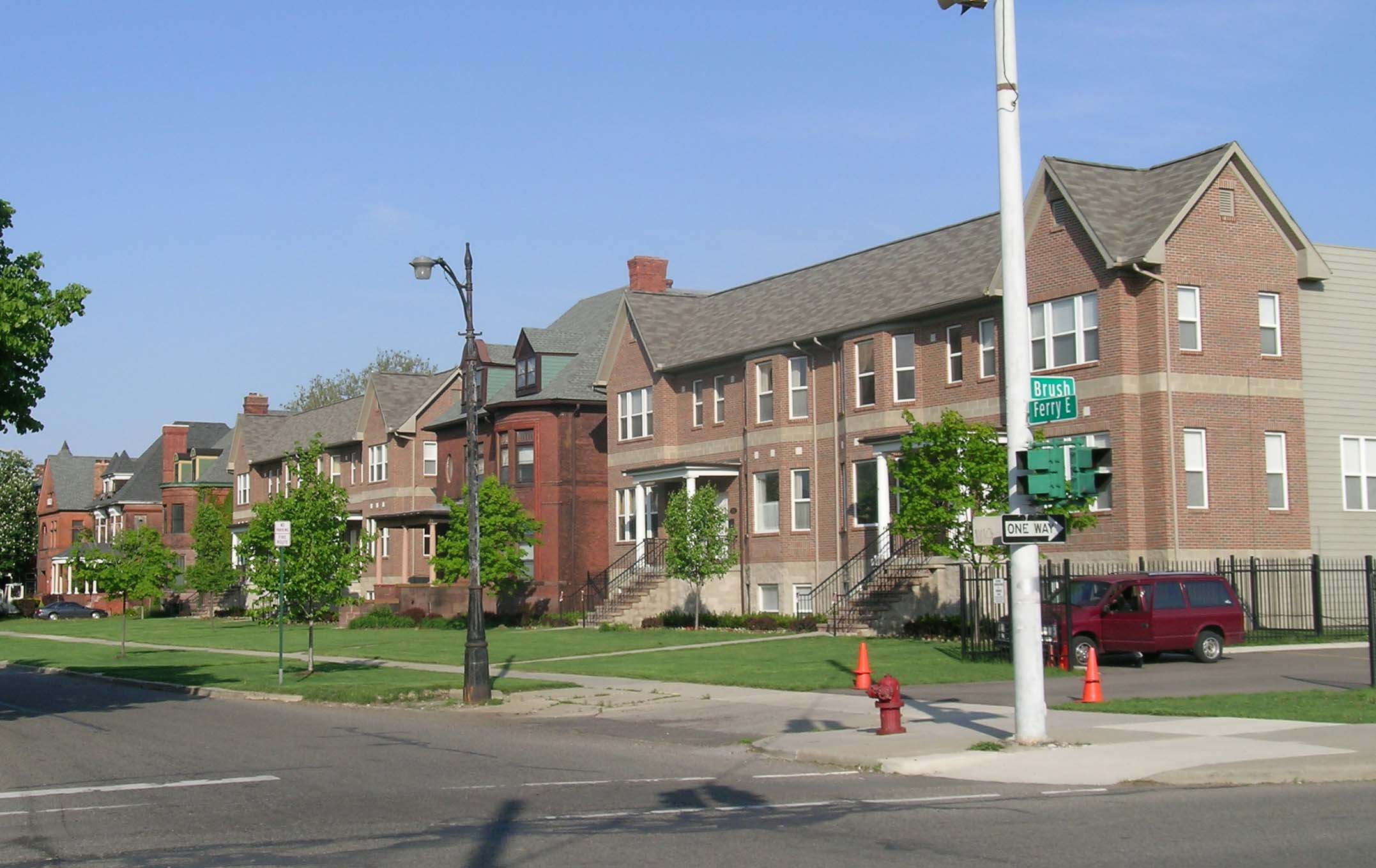
Newer and restored homes in Detroit's East Ferry Avenue Historic District

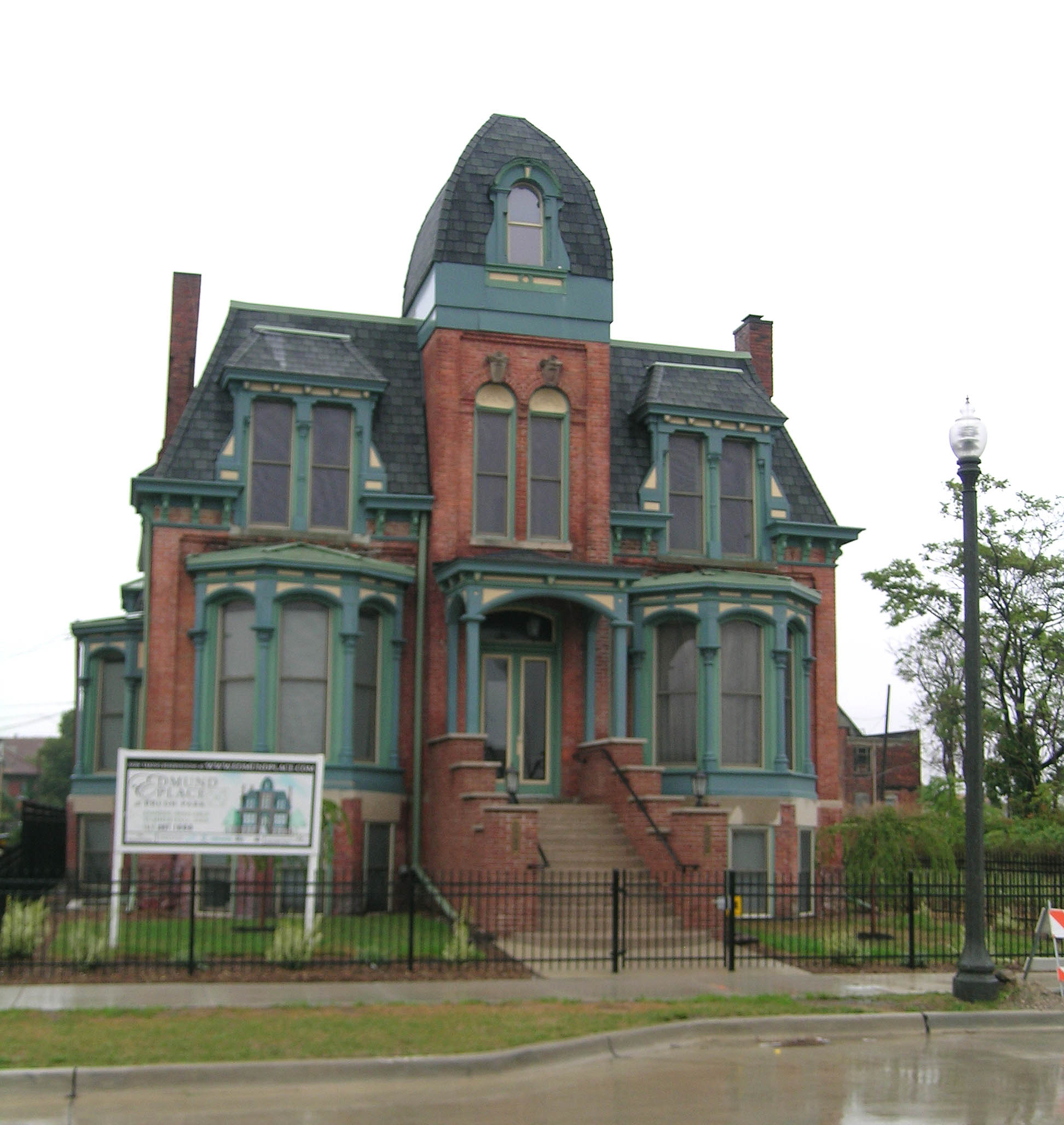
Historic restoration of the Frederick Butler House (1882), with 8,400 sq ft (780 m^{2}) at 291 Edmund Place in Brush Park (Woodward East), completed in 2006

In April 2008, the city unveiled a $300 million stimulus plan to create jobs and revitalize neighborhoods, financed by city bonds and paid for by earmarking about 15% of the wagering tax. The city's plans for revitalization with the Next Detroit Neighborhood Initiative, a 501 (c)(3) organization, include 7-Mile/Livernois, Brightmoor, East English Village, Grand River/Greenfield, North-End, and Osborn. Private organizations have pledged substantial funding to neighborhood revitalization efforts.

A new master plan draft prepared in 2004 has the city composed of ten clusters of neighborhood areas and commercial districts. The plan revealed that Detroit has many growing neighborhoods with youth population increases of greater than ten percent within each cluster, while also showing that larger youth population losses were focused in certain areas, providing support for the concept of focused redevelopment and planning. The city issued a Strategic Master Plan in 2006. In addition to increased business investment, the city's revitalization has been focused on retaining young professionals. The city has cleared a 1,200-acre (490 ha) section of land to initiate the Far Eastside Plan for new neighborhood construction and revitalizations. A 2009 parcel survey found 86 percent of the city's homes to be in good condition, with another 9% needing only minor repairs. The survey found 33,527 or 10% of the city's housing to be unoccupied, but recommended that only one percent or 3,480 of the city's housing units needed to be demolished. About 3,000 of these residential structures were cleared away in 2010.

Immigrants have successfully contributed to the city's neighborhood revitalization, especially in southwest Detroit. This area has experienced a thriving economy in recent years, as evidenced by new housing, increased business openings and the recently opened Mexicantown International Welcome Center.

Lafayette Park is a revitalized neighborhood on the city's east side, part of the Mies van der Rohe Residential District listed in the National Register of Historic Places. The 78-acre (32 ha) urban renewal project was originally called the Gratiot Park Development. Planned by van der Rohe, Ludwig Hilberseimer and Alfred Caldwell, it includes a landscaped, 19-acre (7.7 ha) park with no through traffic, in which these and other low-rise apartment buildings are situated. Churches, schools, parks, theaters, and retail businesses have helped to anchor neighborhoods in the city.

==== Partial list of residential developments ====
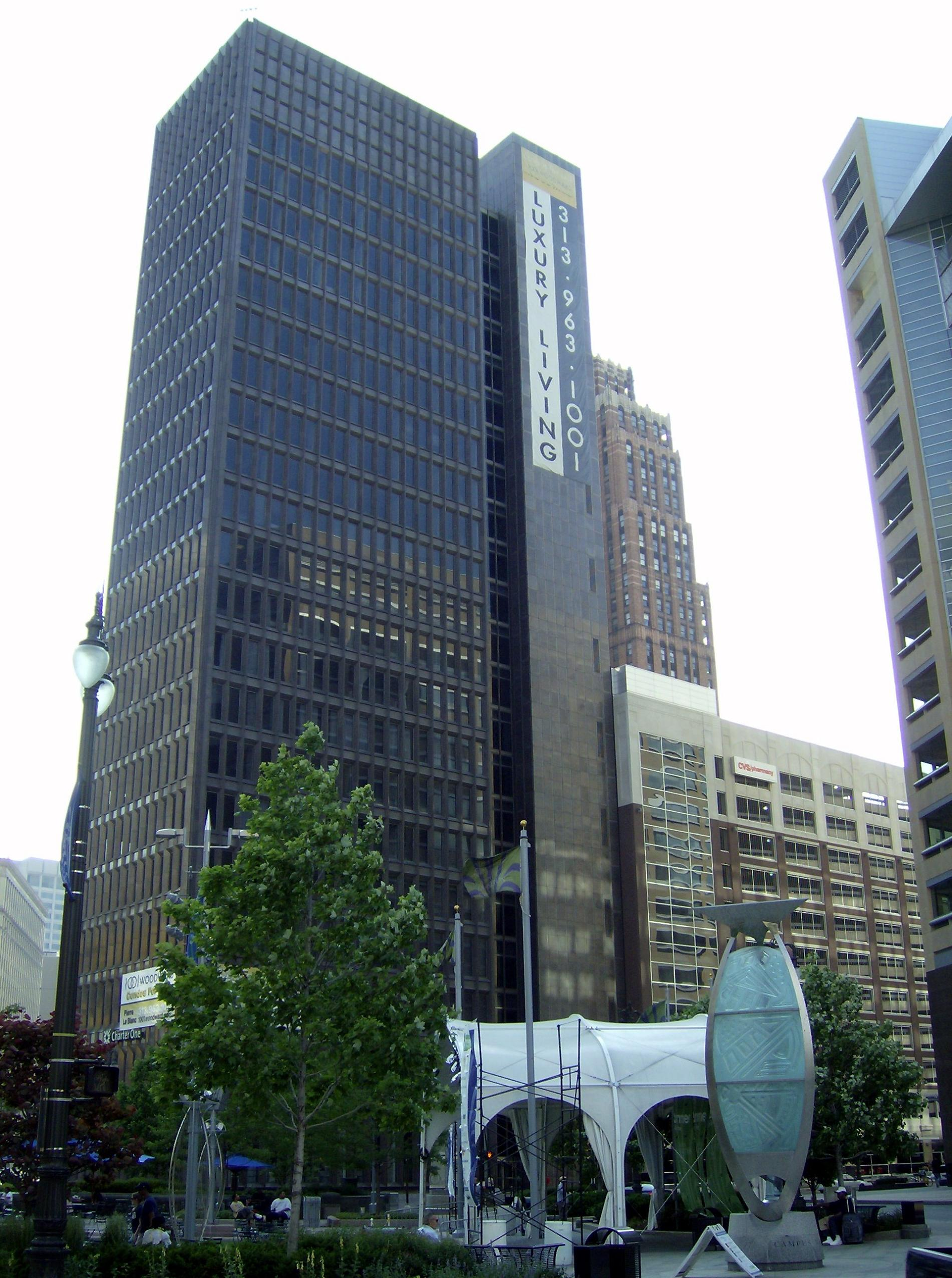
1001 Woodward, redeveloped into high-rise condominiums

Old buildings in the city are being transformed into lofts, condominiums, and high-rise residential apartment units at an accelerated pace along with new Formstone and brick rowhouse construction.

- Alden Park Towers (2014).
- Riverfront Towers (2014).
- Town Residences (2014)
- The Albert (2014)
- David Whitney Building, hotel & apartments (2014)
- David Broderick Tower (2012)
- Westin Book-Cadillac, hotel & condominiums (2008)
- 1001 Woodward, luxury condominiums (2007)

Many more projects are in the process of planning/rendering.

=== Buildings ===
Significant renovations are being undertaken by luxury hotel developers downtown such as Hilton, Westin, Double Tree, and Four Seasons. Some buildings are being redeveloped into high-rise condominiums and residential lofts. These projects are attracting new investment in corporate headquarters, offices, and retail. The city has demolished many unused buildings in order to make way for new development. Highlights of some of the significant renovated buildings and vacant structures are noted below:

==== Renovated structures ====
Name	Built	Architect	Location	Notes	Image
Aloft Detroit at The David Whitney	1914	Daniel Burnham	1553 Woodward Avenue	Completed in December 2014 as an Aloft hotel/residential high-rise.	
Argonaut Building	1930	Albert Kahn	485 W. Milwaukee Ave.	General Motors donated the building to the College for Creative Studies. Redeveloped in 2009.	
Belle Isle Aquarium	1904	Albert Kahn	Conservatory Drive and Inselhrue Ave.	Reopened September 2012.	
Book Tower	1916/1926	Louis Kamper	1265 Washington Boulevard	The Book Tower was power washed in 2017 for the first time in decades. Bedrock bought the building in 2015, and the renovation included residences, offices, retail, and a high-end hotel. Stabilization, cleaning, and restoration work had been underway. Completed in 2023.	
Cadillac Place	1923	Albert Kahn	3044 W. Grand Blvd.	Redeveloped in 2002 as a state office complex.	
David Broderick Tower	1928	Paul and Louis Kamper	10 Witherell St.	Redeveloped in 2012 as a residential high-rise.	
David Stott Building	1929	John M. Donaldson	1150 Griswold Street	Bedrock acquired the Capitol Park Art Deco skyscraper in 2015, after a Chinese investment group neglected the building. Work had been underway for a while to restore it back to its original beauty. Completed in 2018.	
Eddystone Apartments	1924	Louis Kamper	100 Sproat Street	One of three hotels built for Lew Tuller. Renovated as part of the Little Caesars Arena development. Completed in 2022.	
Farwell Building	1915	Harrie Bonnah	1249 Griswold Street	Owned by Motown Construction, owners of the David Broderick Tower. Bought by Karp & Associates LLC, now slated for a mixed-use renovation with financing secured in 2015. Completed in August 2019.	
Element Detroit at the Metropolitan	1925	Weston and Ellington	33 John R. Street	The building was originally built to house wholesale and retail jewelry businesses. The Roxbury Group, who led the renovation of the David Whitney Building, is also renovating the long-vacant Metropolitan Building. It will reopen as the Element Hotel, with "110 light-filled rooms and an atmosphere designed to fuel a life in balance and on the move." Completed in December 2018.	
Ford Piquette Avenue Plant	1904	Field, Hinchman & Smith	461 Piquette Ave.	Second American factory run by Ford Motor Company. Birthplace of the Ford Model T. Museum as of 2001.	
Fort Shelby Hotel	1916/1927	Albert Kahn	525 W. Lafayette Blvd.	Renovated in 2008 as a DoubleTree hotel.	
Harmonie Centre	1905	Raseman & Fischer	1308 Broadway	Also known as Breitmeyer-Tobin Building. It is part of the Broadway Avenue Historic District.	
Kales Building	1914	Albert Kahn	76 W. Adams St.	Redeveloped in 2004 as a residential high-rise with retail. It is part of the Park Avenue Historic District.	
Neighborhood Service Organization Building	1929		882 Oakman Blvd.	Redeveloped as the Neighborhood Service Organization (NSO) Building. It was formerly the Michigan Bell and Western Electric Warehouse. Total investment estimated at $50M.	
Michigan Central	1913	Warren & Wetmore	2405 West Vernor Highway	Ford Motor Company purchased the building in 2018. Ford will use MCS as the centerpiece to its mobility-focused Corktown campus. Completed in 2023. Listed on the National Register of Historic Places. Located near the Ambassador Bridge and the West Vernor-Junction Historic District.	
Newlab @ Michigan Central		Albert Kahn	2231 Dalzelle Street	Former Detroit Public Schools book depository. Ford Motor Company purchased the building in 2018. Completed in 2023.	
Park Avenue House	1924	Louis Kamper	2305 Park Ave.	Also known as the Royal Palm. It is part of the Park Avenue Historic District. The Towne Pump Tavern is located on the ground floor.	
The Press/321	1925	Albert Kahn	321 West Lafayette Street	Bedrock purchased the old Detroit Free Press Building in 2016, which had been vacant since 2001. Construction on the $69 million redevelopment had been underway downtown. Completed in 2021.	
River Place	1891	Donaldson and Meier, Albert Kahn, and Smith, Hinchman and Grylls		Former Parke-Davis pharmaceutical plant, redeveloped as a mixed use residential complex of buildings.	
Riverwalk Hotel	1902	Donaldson and Meier, Albert Kahn	1000 River Place	Former Parke-Davis research laboratory, redeveloped as a hotel and residence.	
Shinola Hotel	1915	Baxter and O'Dell & Halpin	1400 Woodward Avenue	Bedrock and Shinola are redeveloping half a block of lower Woodward into the Shinola Hotel, which will have eight floors with 130 rooms and 16,000 square feet of retail and restaurant space. Two smaller buildings have been demoed in order to rebuild and connect the structures. Completed in December 2018.	
The Siren Hotel	1926	Robert Finn	1509 Broadway Street	High-rise building in downtown which stands at 14 floors. The building at one time held offices originally serving the Wurlitzer Organ Co. It was designed in the renaissance revival architectural style and stands next to the Metropolitan Building. It reopened as The Siren Hotel and was completed in December 2017.	
Vinton Building	1916	Albert Kahn	600 Woodward Ave.	Redeveloped in 2007 as a residential high-rise.	
Wayne County Building	1902	John and Arthur Scott	600 Randolph Street	A group of New York investors purchased the Old Wayne County Building, which the county sold in July 2014. Exterior work has been happening for the past year, and the owners have been looking for a single tenant to fill the Beaux Arts structure downtown. Completed in 2018.	
Westin Book-Cadillac Hotel	1924	Louis Kamper	1114 Washington Blvd.	Renovated in 2008 as a Westin hotel.	
The Whittier	1922	Charles N. Agree	415 Burns Dr.	Redeveloped in 2003 as a residential high-rise.	

==== Vacant structures ====
Name	Built	Architect	Location	Notes	Image
The Detroit Leland	1927	Rapp & Rapp	400 Bagley Street	Developers started work on a $120 million renovation of the Leland Hotel in 2023. The building will offer 340 rental apartments. Completion is scheduled for 2025.	
Detroit Life Building	1923	Arnold & Shreve	2210 Park Avenue	Olympia announced that exterior work had started on this long-vacant building. Kramer Design Group is leading the design of this $17 million redevelopment into 32,000 square feet of office and 6,000 square feet of retail.	
Film Exchange Building	1926	C. Howard Crane	2310 Cass Avenue	Distributed films to Detroit's theatres. Detail shown.	
Fisher Body Plant 21	1919	Albert Kahn	700 Piquette Avenue	Former automobile factory, then a Carter Color in the 1990s. A long-empty Detroit auto body factory, Fisher Body Plant No. 21, would be transformed into more than 400 apartments plus retail space under a redevelopment plan unveiled Monday, March 7, 2022 by the developers and city officials. The $134 million project, called Fisher 21 Lofts, is to go for site approvals late spring 2022 and could get underway late 2023 for a 2025 completion date.	
Grande Ballroom	1928	Charles N. Agree	8952 Grand River Avenue	Has served as a rock concert venue.	
Herman Kiefer Hospital	1928	George Mason	1151 Taylor Street	Led by New York developer and architect Ron Castellano, the redevelopment covers 18 acres of the former hospital complex and could cost $100 million. Early plans could include a hotel and a skate park, and altogether, it could take up to eight years to complete.	
Lee Plaza Hotel / Apartments	1928–1929	Charles Noble	2240 West Grand Boulevard	The city of Detroit plans to sell Lee Plaza to a joint venture that will redevelop the historic building into 180 residential units, and retail. The redevelopment will be a joint effort by Detroit-based Roxbury Group and Ethos Development Partners, who bought the property from the city in 2019 for $350,000. The project's initial $59 million phase is to start next year and finish in 2024 with the creation of 117 new affordable residences for income-qualified seniors on floors 2 through 10. A second $20 million phase would create 60 to 70 market-rate apartments on floors 11 through 16 with an anticipated 2025 completion.	
National Theatre	1911	Albert Kahn, Ernest Wilby	118 Monroe Street	Surviving historic structure on the Monroe Block has Baroque-Beaux Arts-Moorish style. Theatre seating capacity was 800.	
Packard Automotive Plant	1911	Albert Kahn	East Grand Boulevard & Concord Street	Pablo Palazuelo purchased the plant in 2013. Demolition is scheduled for 2023.	
United Artists Theatre Building	1928	C. Howard Crane	150 Bagley Street	Possibility for redevelopment by Ilitch Holdings. Theatre seating capacity is 2,070.	
Vanity Ballroom	1926	Charles N. Agree	1024 Newport Street	Has served as a rock concert venue.	
Women's City Club Building	1924	William B. Stratton	2110 Park Avenue	Olympia announced the rehab of the building in 2018. Kramer Design Group will lead the $25 million renovation of this building, which will have 47,000 square feet of office space and 10,000 square feet of retail space.	

==== Major structures demolished ====
Name	Built	Demolished	Architect	Location	Notes
Park Avenue Hotel	1924	2015	Louis Kamper	2643 Park Avenue	One of three hotels built for Lew Tuller.
Hotel Charlevoix	1905	2013	William S. Joy	2029 Park Avenue	Beaux-Arts styled brick residential building.
Lafayette Building	1923	2010	Charles Howard Crane	144 West Lafayette Boulevard	Italian Renaissance style architecture.

== See also ==
- Adaptive reuse
- Building restoration
- Historic preservation
