= Hantz Woodlands =

Hantz Woodlands, also known as Hantz Farms, is an urban tree farm on the lower east side of Detroit. The project has cleared more than 2,000 vacant city-owned lots, totaling more than 140 acres, and has demolished blighted homes and cleared empty lots to make way for a hardwood tree farm, bounded by E. Jefferson Avenue, Mack Avenue, St. Jean Street and Van Dyke Avenue. Hantz Woodlands is a project of Hantz Farms, LLC, a division of Hantz Group. It is the largest urban tree farm in the U.S.

== Background ==
John Hantz, twenty-year Detroit native and CEO of Hantz Group, proposed Hantz Woodlands as a way to remedy blight, increase neighborhood safety, and stop the decline of Detroit property values. Blighted areas can have negative psychological impacts on community members and lead to higher crime rates. Removing blight can help improve how outsiders and community members view the community and increase their desire to invest in the area.

During his daily drives through Detroit, Hantz noticed the countless empty lots and decaying houses, many of which were in foreclosure and/or were in city ownership, that he passed on his route. Many of the lots in the areas that would later become part of Hantz Woodlands are on blocks that have been characterized by Data Driven Detroit as blocks that are “least active, with less density, more abandonment, and a high concentration of vacant lots” or areas with high numbers of vacant lots and lower occupancy levels mixed with “quality housing stock." John Hantz was inspired to improve these areas and decrease the perception that vacant land detracts from the value of an area in order to improve neighborhood morale, safety, and value as well as improve the overall image that comes to mind when people think of Detroit.

Approximately 40 square miles of Detroit’s 139 square mile area were vacant before Hantz began his project. Hantz stated that this lack of scarcity in real estate and available properties caused a continual decline of Detroit’s property values, and he suggested that making a large amount of this vacant land unavailable in the real estate market could raise property values. He also believed that buying up this land and creating an urban farm would create a platform for tourism, education, community development, and economic development while returning a portion of the city’s 40 square vacant miles to the city tax roll. “I thought, What could do that in a positive way? What’s a development that people would want to be associated with? And that’s when I came up with a farm,” Hantz says.

Hantz originally envisioned Hantz Woodlands as a horticultural farm because he believed it could help generate economic activity as well as remedy the lack of healthy food options, known as a food desert, which many residents in Detroit currently face. However, concerns over competition with local urban farmers, worries about the use of pesticides, neighborhood distrust of Hantz’s motives, and Hantz's grievances with agricultural taxes led to the conversion of the project into a large-scale tree farm.

== Controversy ==
Critics of the Hantz Woodlands project stated that Hantz Farms received an unfairly low price and streamlined purchasing procedure for the land, compared to urban farmers who struggled to purchase the land they farmed. Residents of the areas in which the Hantz Group purchased plots also faced endless hurdles when they tried to buy these same properties, often due to, as they stated, their lack of political power and their lack of large quantities of money. In response to this, the Detroit Planning and Development Agency offered neighbors the chance to purchase the land that Hantz was interested in. John Hantz also paid more for the vacant lots and those with abandoned housing structures on them than they were initially going for at auction in hopes of showing he was not unfairly benefiting from the proceedings.

Concerns also existed over the consolidation of land in one businessman’s hands, with many fearing what would happen if Hantz later sold the land to a developer. Opponents feared Hantz would only hold on to the land for his three year contract before selling the land to be developed into high-end and commercial real-estate, generating massive profits for the Hantz Group at the expense of community cohesion as well as without any payoff for long-time residents. "[W]e have concern about large amounts of land being amassed in the hands of single individuals," urban farmer Malik Yakini says. "[P]art of the imbalance we see in the world today has to do with large amounts of wealth being amassed by wealthy white men." Some community members disliked the idea of a white businessman coming into a neighborhood that was not his own and forcing his own vision of how to improve the area onto the community. Black community members often viewed his actions as a way to diminish the strength of existing black power structures in Detroit as well. Rather than allowing Hantz Farms to purchase the land, many opponents proposed creating a community trust.

Despite contentious community meetings and a strong activist presence against the project, plans for Hantz Woodlands were eventually approved 5-4 by the Detroit City Council in October 2013. Kwame Kenyatta, one of the most vocal opponents to the measure on the Detroit City Council, stated that "This is not the way to grow a vibrant city. Just because we have vacant land doesn't mean we should turn Detroit into a farm." Other members of the City Council, such as Saunteel Jenkins, argued that "Farming will be one of the many things that be part of Detroit's reinvention ... The auto industry used to be our bread and butter, but now we have to diversify."

Hantz Woodlands was featured in Sean O'Grady's 2016 documentary Land Grab, which chronicled the discussions within Detroit communities and government over whether Hantz Farms' purchase was a “land grab.” John Hantz describes the Hantz Woodlands project as “definitely a land grab” in the documentary, and states, “you can’t farm without land.” John Hantz has also stated that his goals for the Hantz Woodlands project are not to generate economic gains for his company but rather to use agriculture as a tool for decreasing blight and reuniting the community through a common purpose of caring for the land.

In recent years, John Hantz and Hantz Woodlands have come under scrutiny for acting in ways similar to speculation, in which large tracts of land are bought and then left alone to accumulate value. In September 2018, Josh Akers of the Urban Praxis Workshop accused Hantz Farms of acting in the interest of themselves rather than the community, saying that "Overall, Hantz Woodlands falls under our working definition of speculation given the quantity of property and their varying conditions." The project has denied these claims, citing their work in maintaining their "1,970 properties" in Detroit. Upon seeing some of the many properties contained under Hantz Woodlands in person, it is evident to viewers that these properties appear to be adding little curb appeal to the area. What may have once been decrepit buildings or over-grown lots has been replaced with scraggly trees and few signs of a concerted effort at beautification, possibly suggesting that Hantz Woodlands will not be a long-term enterprise.

In May 2018, Crain’s Detroit reported that business cards at a real estate and development conference showed a map of the Hantz Woodlands land with the subtitle “Would you like to develop/own the next opportunity in Detroit?” This prompted speculation that Hantz Farms was interested in selling the property, which representatives for Hantz Farms denied.

== Planting projects ==
The project's 2013 agreement with the city of Detroit called for the demolition of 50 vacant city-owned structures, the planting of 15,000 trees, and the general maintenance and upkeep of the district properties. In December 2014, Detroit mayor Mike Duggan presented the company with a certificate of completion for having fulfilled this agreement.

In addition to hosting annual tree-planting events, Hantz Woodlands began the Timber Trot 5K in 2016 to benefit the Hantz Foundation.

- On May 17, 2014, over 1,000 volunteers planted 15,000 maple and oak saplings on 20 acres at Hantz Woodlands.
- On October 15, 2014, 150 mature sugar maple trees were driven to Detroit from Michigan and New York, and planted at Hantz Woodlands. Keith Alexander, an Oxford-based tree broker, located sugar maples that were straight enough and tall enough to meet Hantz's specifications.
- On May 9, 2015, volunteers planted 5,000 tulip poplar trees, with the intent to later transport some to a different location.
- On May 7, 2016, Hantz Woodlands planted 3,150 six-foot-tall sugar maples.
- On May 6, 2017, volunteers planted approximately 3,000 trees. See images of tree planting 2017

== See also ==
- Planning and development in Detroit
- Urban agriculture
- Urban forestry
