= Park Avenue Building =

Detroit high-rise building

Coordinates: 42.33643°N 83.05282°W

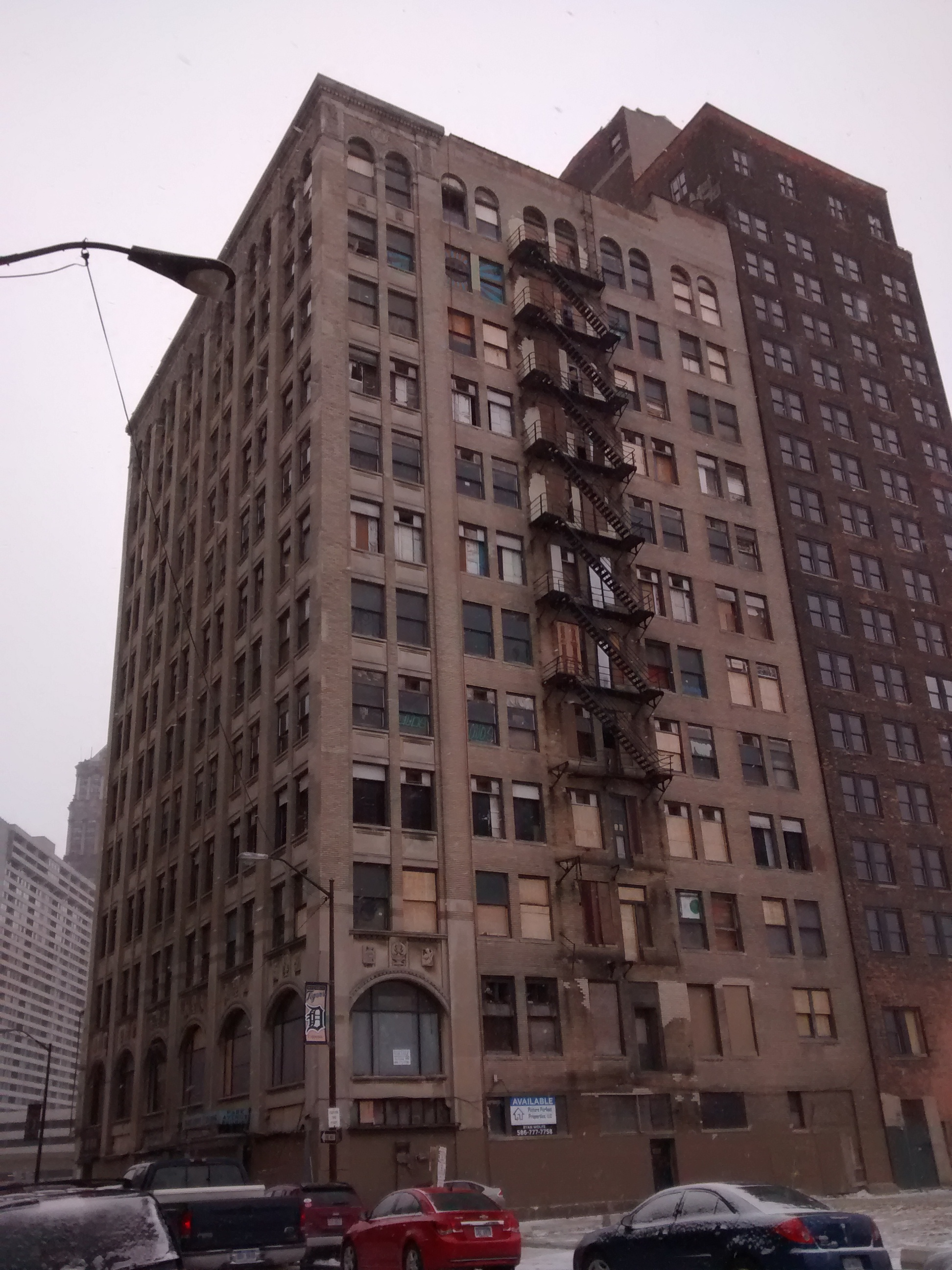
Park Avenue Building

The Park Avenue Building is a 12-story beaux-arts high-rise located at 2001–2017 Park Avenue in the Grand Circus Park Historic District in Downtown Detroit, Michigan. Formerly known as the General Necessities Building, the 101,565 sq. ft. office building was designed by Albert Kahn in 1922.

The building was previously owned by Ralph Sachs, the former owner of the historic Hotel Charlevoix which was demolished in 2013, the Park Avenue building was listed for sale on July 3, 2015, for $16,500,000. The Park Avenue Building has been targeted for demolition by city planners as part of the "Arena District" rehabilitation effort.

== Redevelopment ==
In April 2018, developer Rino Soave of Infinity Homes & Co purchased the building from the Sachs estate for an undisclosed price after Sachs died in January 2017. Soave's company plans to redevelop the building into 75–100 apartments with 4–5,000 square feet of retail on the first floor.
