= Washington Boulevard Building =

Coordinates: 42.3325°N 83.0500°W

- U.S. Historic district – Contributing property
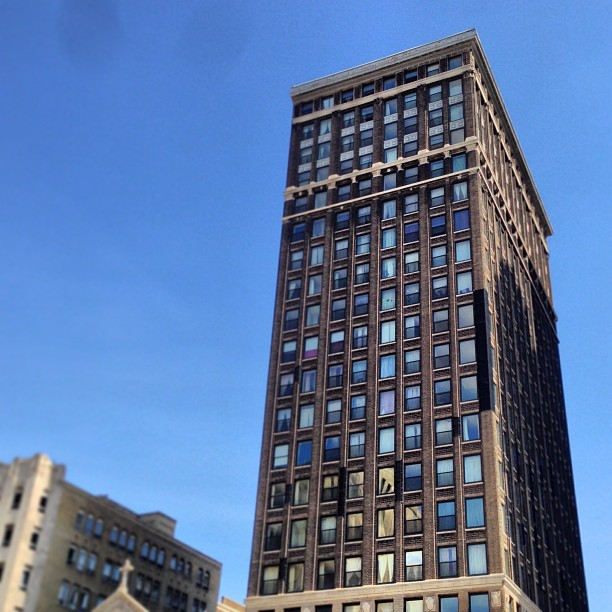
- Location: 234 State Street; Detroit, Michigan
- Built: 1922–23
- Architect: Louis Kamper
- Architectural style: Chicago school
- Part of: Washington Boulevard Historic District (ID82002914)
- Added to NRHP: July 15, 1982

The Washington Boulevard Building is a high-rise apartment building located at 234 State Street at the corner of State Street and Washington Boulevard in downtown Detroit, Michigan. The building, designed by Louis Kamper, was constructed from 1922 to 1923. It stands at 23 stories, and features a neoclassical limestone base.

Across the streets lie the Book Tower and the Book-Cadillac Hotel.
