= Charlevoix Building =

Historic building in Detroit

- U.S. Historic district – Contributing property
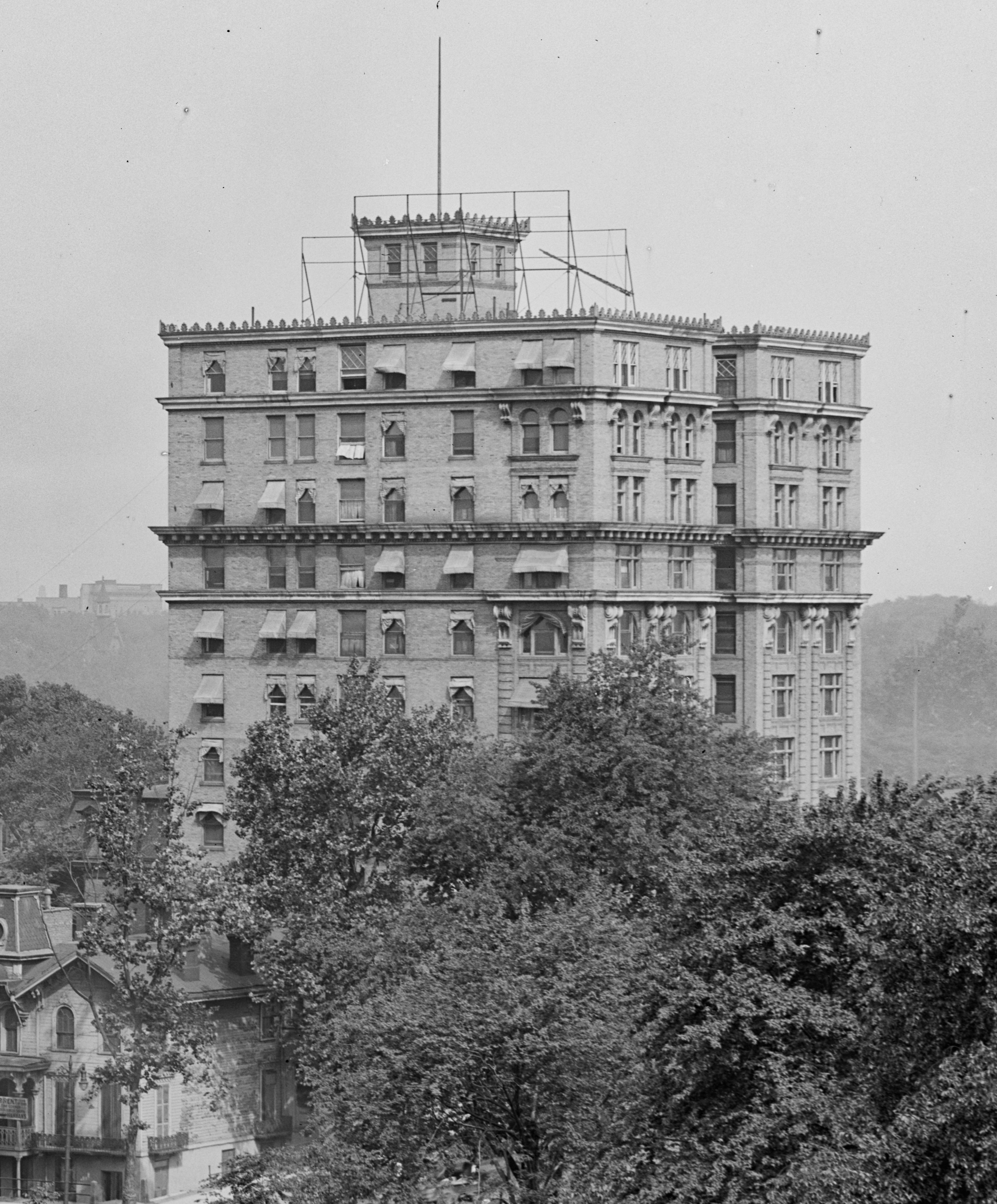
- Location: 2029 Park Avenue, Detroit, Michigan
- Coordinates: 42.336683°N 83.053050°W
- Built: 1905
- Architect: William S. Joy
- Architectural style: Beaux-Arts
- Demolished: June 23, 2013
- Part of: Park Avenue Historic District (ID97000396)

The Charlevoix Building (/ˈʃɑːrləvɔɪ/ SHAR-lə-voy), also known as Hotel Charlevoix, was a highrise building in Downtown Detroit. It was erected in 1905 and designed by local architect William S. Joy. The building was originally built as a speculative office building, converted into a hotel in 1912, then back into an office building again in 1922, although there is evidence that it was occasionally a mix of both.

The building closed sometime in the 1980s after being purchased by Ralph Sachs. It remained closed and was later added to the Park Avenue Historic District. Despite being the oldest hotel in Detroit at the time, it was demolished in 2013 for neglect. A parking lot currently sits on this site.

== History ==
The Hotel Charlevoix was erected in 1905 and designed by architect William S. Joy. It was originally designed in the Beaux-Arts style with a light bay in the center, giving the appearance that the building was divided in two. The Building was originally built as an office building, converted into a hotel in 1912, then back into an office building again in 1922. There is evidence that it was at one point a mix of both. It was a cheaper alternative to others in the area by Lew Tuller. The details were removed in 1953, leaving it bare. The building closed sometime in the 1980s after being purchased by Ralph Sachs.

== Demolition ==
The moment Sachs had been waiting for finally came in March 2012 when several bricks fell from the front facade of the Charlevoix, hitting a parked car below and Sachs requested demolition.

On June 13, 2012, the City Historic District Commission held a hearing on the proposed demolition of the Charlevoix. Because the building was in the Park Avenue Historic District, the commission would need to approve the demolition. Sachs was not at the hearing, but his representatives urged the commission to allow for the building to come down, citing the falling bricks; the fact that the building is a frequent target of squatters and urban explorers; the building lacks any historical details; and that Sachs had been unable to find a developer or buyer for the building. They also said that Sachs didn't have the financial means to rehab, secure, or demolish the building himself.

Sachs' representatives did not prove that he couldn't afford to pay for demolition or mothballing the building, nor that the building was in imminent danger of collapse, prompting the HDC to deny permission to demolish the building. Sachs was given fifteen days to submit a plan for the structure. It was unclear what would happen if Sachs did not comply.

On June 23, 2013, workers took down the Charlevoix in one quick demolition. After cutting the steel I-beams supporting the old hotel, cables were used to bring the building down upon itself.

== See also ==
- Architecture of metropolitan Detroit
