= Park Avenue Historic District (Detroit) =

Historic district in Michigan, United States

- U.S. National Register of Historic Places
- U.S. Historic district
- Michigan State Historic Site
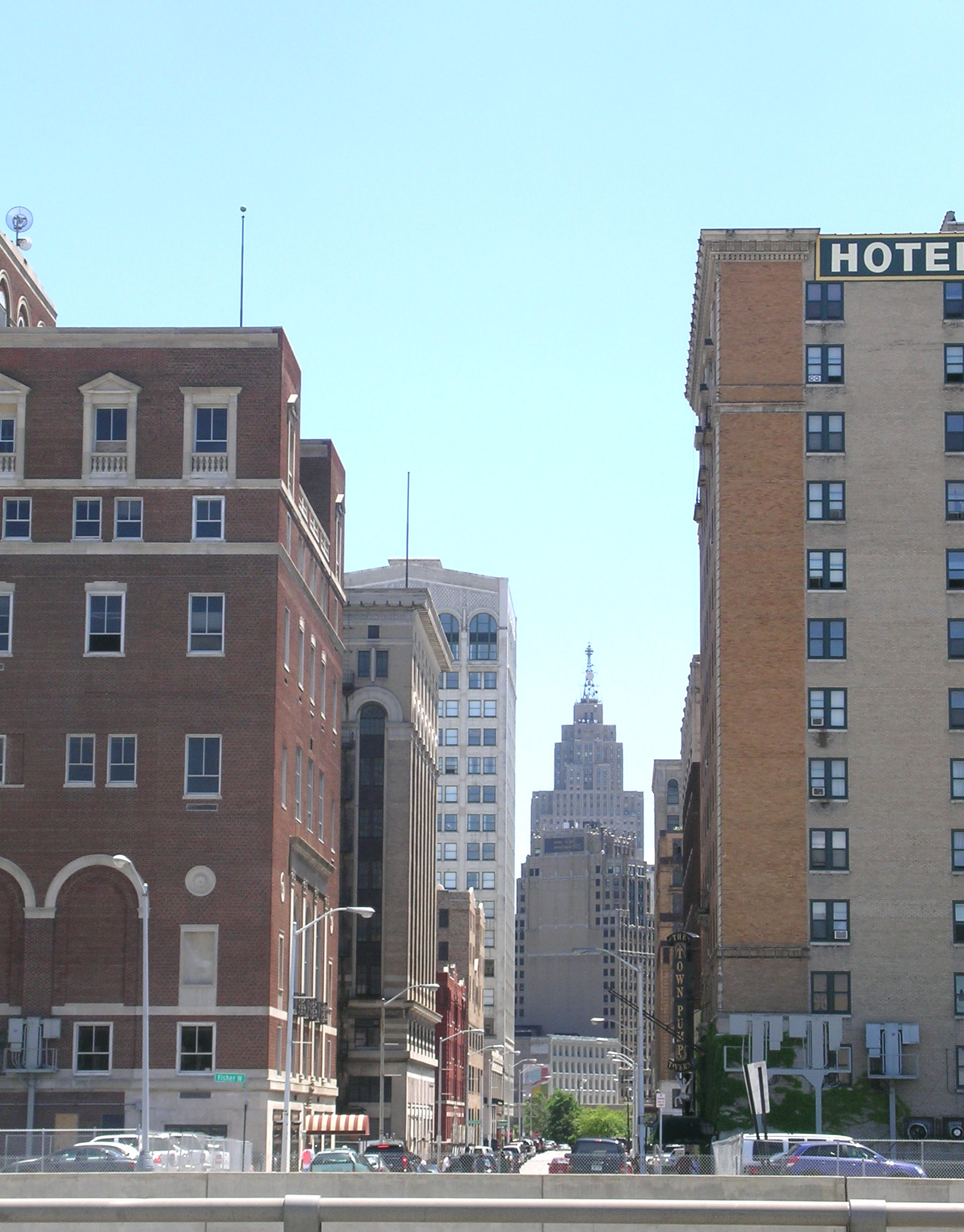
- Park Avenue Historic District, looking south from across I-75
- Interactive map
- Location: Detroit, Michigan, U.S.
- Coordinates: 42°20′15″N 83°3′13″W
- Architectural style: Early Commercial, Late Victorian
- NRHP reference No.: 97000396

Significant dates
- Added to NRHP: May 13, 1997
- Designated MSHS: April 18, 1996

The Park Avenue Historic District is a historic district located in Detroit, Michigan, along Park Avenue between Adams St. and I-75. The district includes the Women's City Club, the Detroit Building, and the Park Avenue House. The district was designated a Michigan State Historic Site in 1996 and listed on the National Register of Historic Places in 1997.

== History ==
In the 1920s, Detroit's prestigious Grand Circus Park was crowded with buildings. The automotive boom in the city increased the pressure for office space, and development began to spill north from Grand Circus Park up Park Avenue. In 1922, Albert Kahn designed the Park Avenue Building, located at the entrance to Park Avenue (but included in the neighboring Grand Circus Park Historic District). Other architects and artisans contributed hotels, apartment buildings, and office buildings to the structures on Park Avenue.

In 1923, the Park Avenue Association was formed. They planned the street to concentrate high-grade commercial and office space at the south end, and prestigious residential development at the north end. As the district developed, Detroiters consciously perceived it as their city's version of New York City's Fifth Avenue.

Also on Park Avenue was Women's City Club and the Detroit chapter of the Colony Club, both critical in providing women with social and work activities and supporting women's suffrage.

The area was used decreasingly during the Great Depression, but saw a resurgence after World War II, with a mix of social groups and multiple restaurant and entertainment venues. At the same time, an industrial character was added to the district when the Iodent Chemical Company began manufacturing toothpaste in a building along Park Avenue. The proximity of the Fox Theatre and other nearby venues (including Comerica Park) has led to increased redevelopment in the 2000s. The Iodent Building has been redeveloped into lofts, the Colony Club has been refurbished, and two new entertainment venues, Cliff Bell's and the Park Bar, have opened.

The district was listed on the state register of historic places in 1996, and on the National Register of Historic Places in 1997.

== Historic structures ==
The Park Avenue Historic District contains thirteen buildings. Two of these (the Women's City Club and the Park Avenue House) are separately listed on the National Register. Two additional buildings on either side of Park Avenue at West Adams (the Park Avenue Building and the Kales Building), are located within the Grand Circus Park Historic District, and thus not included in this district.

Name	Image	Year	Location	Style	Architect	Notes
Women's City Club		1922	2110 Park Avenue		William B. Stratton; Waldridge & Aldinger	Listed on the National Register of Historic Places.
Detroit Building		1923	2210 Park Avenue	Beaux-Arts	Arnold & Shreve	Renovated in 2009.
Park Avenue House		1924	2305 Park Avenue		Louis Kamper	The Town Pump Taven is located on the ground floor of the high rise residential building. Listed on the National Register of Historic Places.
