= Eddystone Building =

Building in Detroit, Michigan

- U.S. National Register of Historic Places
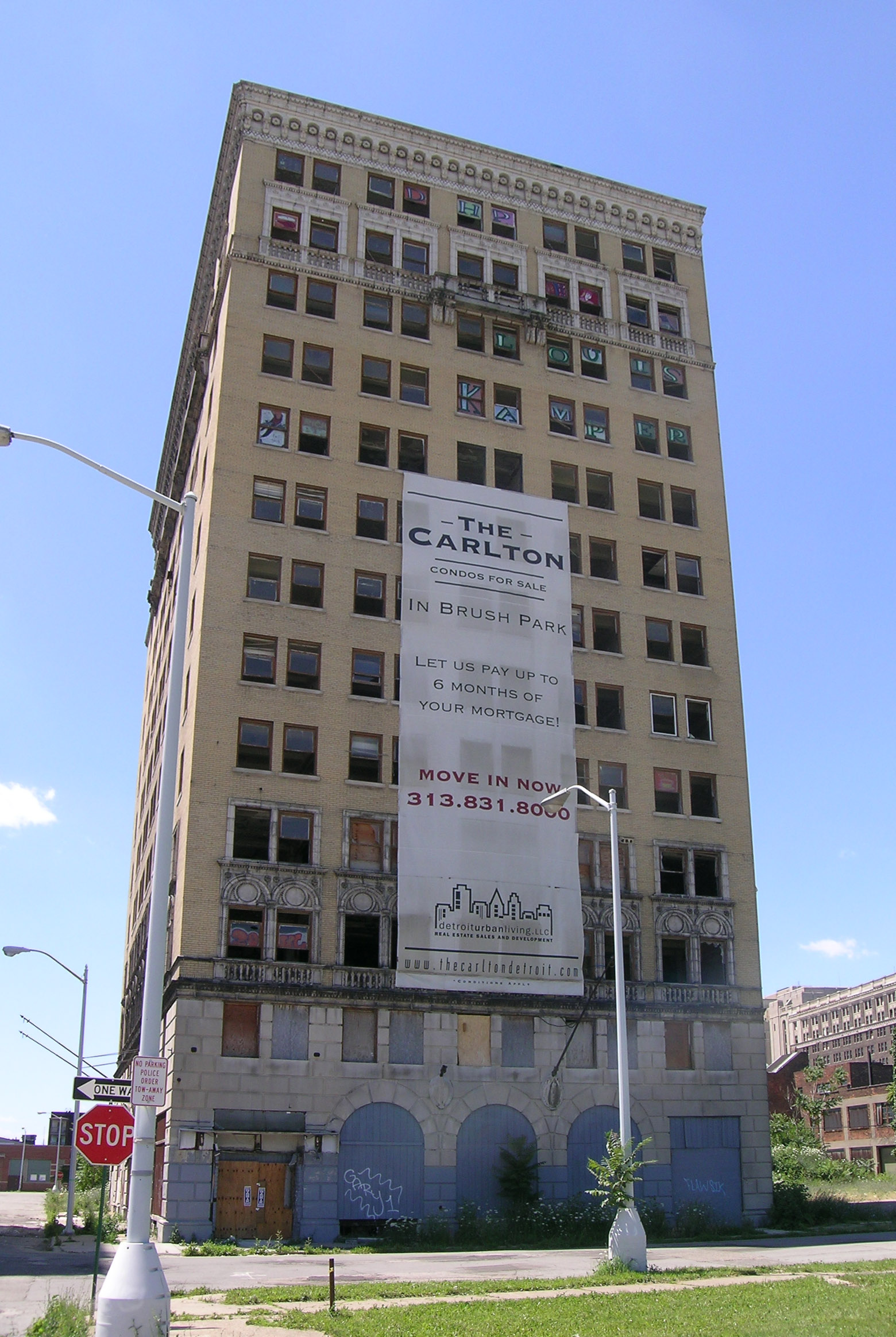
- Facade of the Eddystone in 2008
- Interactive map
- Location: 100-118 Sproat Street; Detroit, Michigan
- Coordinates: 42°20′30″N 83°3′25″W
- Built: 1924
- Architect: Louis Kamper
- Architectural style: Renaissance Revival
- NRHP reference No.: 06000588
- Added to NRHP: July 12, 2006

The Eddystone Building is an apartment building and former hotel located in Midtown Detroit, Michigan, at 100-118 Sproat Street. It was listed on the National Register of Historic Places in 2006.

== History ==
=== Usage as a hotel until the 1990s ===
The Eddystone is one of three hotels on Park Avenue designed by Louis Kamper for Lew Tuller; the other two are the Royal Palm at 2305 Park Avenue and the former Park Avenue Hotel at 2643 Park Avenue (across Sproat from the Eddystone). All three are on the National Register of Historic Places. The Park Avenue Hotel was demolished in 2015.

The Eddystone was the first of these hotels to be built. Tuller had already other hotels, and by the early 1920s the northern portion of Park Avenue looked like an ideal place to expand his hotel empire. Tuller hired Louis Kamper to design the hotel on the corner of Park Avenue and Sproat, and the building was constructed in 1924. The hotel had 312 rooms, most of which were rented monthly.

Tuller, however, had overextended himself financially in building his hotels, and in 1928 lost all three Park Avenue hotels. Financier David P. Katz purchased the building, and owned it until 1966. However, the area surrounding the Eddystone became more impoverished, and as the neighborhood's fortunes declined so did the Eddystone's. It continued in operation as a residential hotel until the late 1990s, when it was abandoned.

=== Multiple failed redevelopment attempts ===
In 2005, then Michigan Governor Jennifer M. Granholm announced plans to convert the Eddystone into 60 condominiums with street-level retail space using a $641,000 brownfield tax credit. In August 2010, work was being carried out on the site to secure the lower floors of the building by bricking up the windows. However, the planned renovation never occurred, and the building continued to sit vacant.

In 2010, the Eddystone was purchased by Olympia Entertainment for $1,943 (later transferred to the Marian Ilitch-owned Ilitch Holdings for $1 in 2016). In 2015, Olympia began construction on the Little Caesars Arena near the Eddystone. As part of the development, the Park Avenue Hotel was demolished, and Olympia was required to redevelop the Eddystone, which sits just outside the footprint of the new arena. The 2015 agreement specified that Olympia had to finish redevelopment of the Eddystone within one year of the issuance of a certificate of occupancy for Little Caesars Arena, which was issued on September 12, 2017. Olympia failed to comply with the requirement, as construction had not even started by August 2018.

=== Current redevelopment ===
After years of stagnated renovations, Olympia signed a development agreement with the City of Detroit that would require Olympia to have a $33 million letter of credit or performance bond that could be used by the city if Olympia failed to meet the agreed redevelopment. Subsequent to this agreement, renovations began on the building into 81 rental units and 38,000 square feet of commercial space. In August 2021, Four Man Ladder Management was selected to operate a new restaurant on the ground floor of the Eddystone. Their previous projects include Grey Ghost and Second Best bar in nearby Midtown and Brush Park. The apartment conversion was completed that year. The building set aside 19 apartments for affordable housing.

== Description ==
The Eddystone Hotel is a thirteen-story, rectangular, Renaissance Revival steel frame building, clad with brick, limestone, and terra cotta. The first and second stories are clad with limestone, and the upper floors are clad with yellow brick. A denticulated cornice separates the second and third floors, and another terra cotta beltcourse separates the eleventh and twelfth floors. Decorative terra cotta elements are used around the windows on the third, fourth, and twelfth floors, and a terra cotta cornice caps the building.

The main facade is seven bays wide, with the five center bays containing paired windows on each floor and the end bays containing a single window in the third to thirteenth stories. On the lower floors, the center bays contain large arches, the center one of which contains the entrance. The outer bays contain storefront entrances. Through the main entrance is a small vestibule that leads to the main lobby in the center of the building. Elevators and stairwells lead to the upper floors. The upper floors still have the original room layout, with rooms located on three sides of the building and the elevators, main hallway and stairwells located on the fourth.

== See also ==
- Planning and development in Detroit
