= Park Avenue Hotel (Detroit) =

- Formerly listed on the U.S. National Register of Historic Places
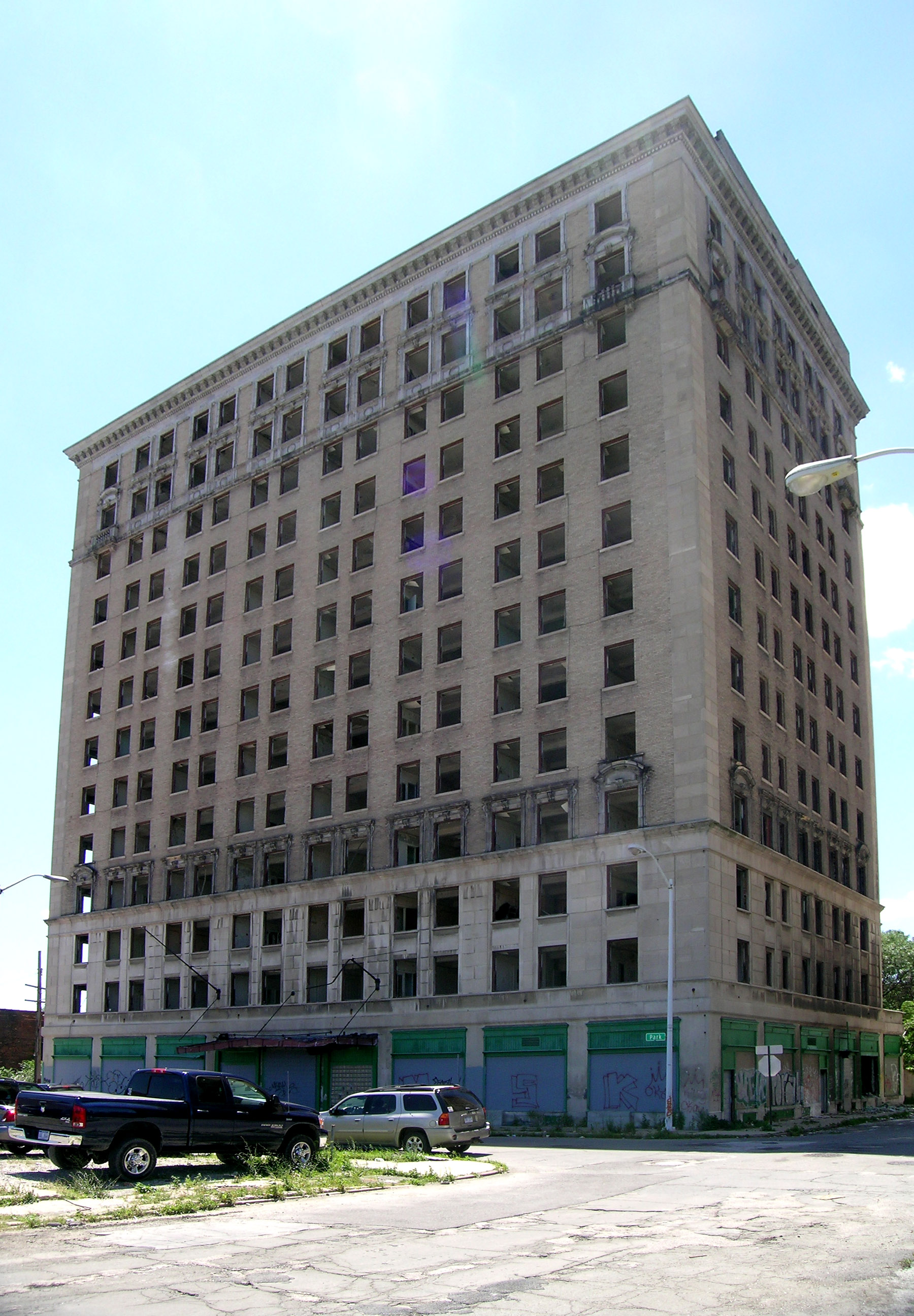
- Interactive map
- Location: 2643 Park Avenue; Detroit, Michigan
- Coordinates: 42°20′28″N 83°3′24″W
- Built: 1924
- Architect: Louis Kamper
- Architectural style: Renaissance
- Demolished: July 11, 2015
- NRHP reference No.: 06000586

Significant dates
- Added to NRHP: July 12, 2006
- Removed from NRHP: December 2, 2024

The Park Avenue Hotel was a hotel in the Cass Corridor of Detroit, Michigan. It was listed on the National Register of Historic Places in 2006, and removed in 2024. It was also known as Salvation Army Harbor Light Center and is not to be confused with Park Avenue House, also once known as Park Avenue Hotel. The building was imploded on July 11, 2015.

== History ==
The Park Avenue was one of three former hotels located on Park Avenue and designed by Louis Kamper for Lew Tuller; the other two are the Eddystone at 100 Sproat St. (across Sproat from the Park Avenue Hotel) and the Royal Palm at 2305 Park Avenue which now operates as the Park Avenue House. All three were on the National Register of Historic Places, and the city council designated the property a municipal historic district in 2006.

The Park Avenue Hotel was constructed in 1924, and contained 252 rooms. However, Tuller apparently overextended himself financially constructing hotels, and in 1928 lost all three hotels along Park Avenue. The Park Avenue Hotel continued to operate as a residential hotel until 1957 when it was purchased by the Salvation Army and converted into a home for the aged.

However, the surrounding neighborhood steadily declined, and by the 1980s, the Salvation Army was using the hotel as their Harbor Light Center homeless shelter. Operations were moved in 2007, and the Salvation Army planned to sell the building to a developer. However, those plans fell through.

The building was acquired by the development arm of Olympia Entertainment and the Detroit Historic District Commission approved its demolition to make room for the loading dock for Little Caesars Arena, home of the Detroit Red Wings and Detroit Pistons. It was imploded by Adamo Demolition on July 11, 2015.

== Description ==
The Park Avenue Hotel was a rectangular, thirteen story Renaissance Revival steel frame structure, clad with brick, limestone, and terra cotta. Smooth limestone covered the first three floors, forming a base, and buff-colored brick with limestone quoins were used above. There were decorative terra cotta window treatments on the 4th, 12th, and 13th floors, and a decorative terra cotta cornice topped the structure. The main facade exhibited a vast array of windows. The first floor contained the main entrance and storefront windows.

== See also ==
- Planning and development in Detroit
