= Cadillac Square Building =

Skyscraper in Detroit, Michigan, US

Coordinates: 42.33212°N 83.04569°W

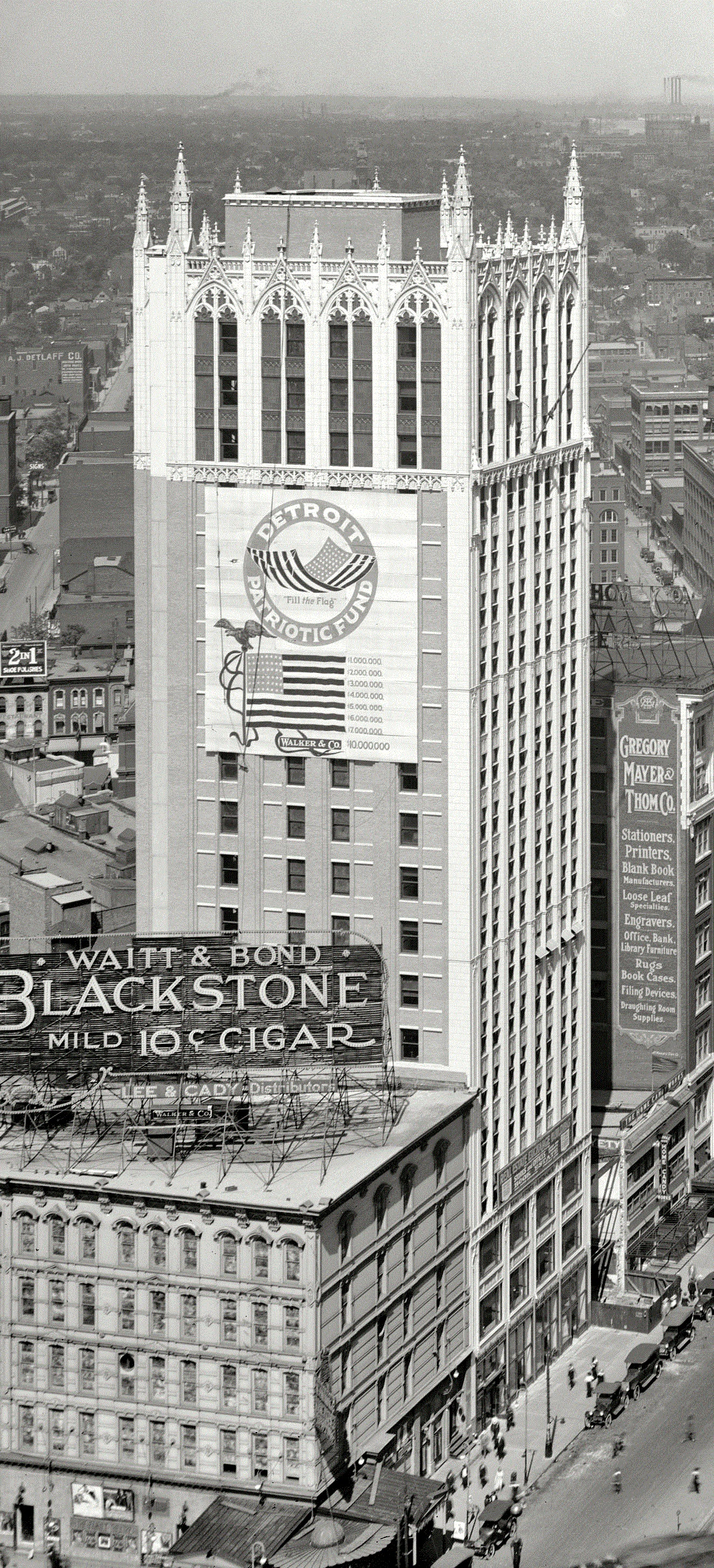
Cadillac Square Building in 1918

The Cadillac Square Building (also known as the Real Estate Exchange Building) was a building located at 17 Cadillac Square in Detroit, Michigan. It was constructed in 1918 and opened in 1919. It stood at 20 floors, with two basement floors, for a total of 22 stories. The high-rise was designed by architect Louis Kamper in the Neo-Gothic architectural style and shared similar characteristics and proportioning to the neighboring Cadillac Tower. The high-rise was built on the former site of a Salvation Army Hall, and was demolished between 1976 and early 1977. A parking lot took its place.
