= Detroit Building =

- U.S. Historic district – Contributing property
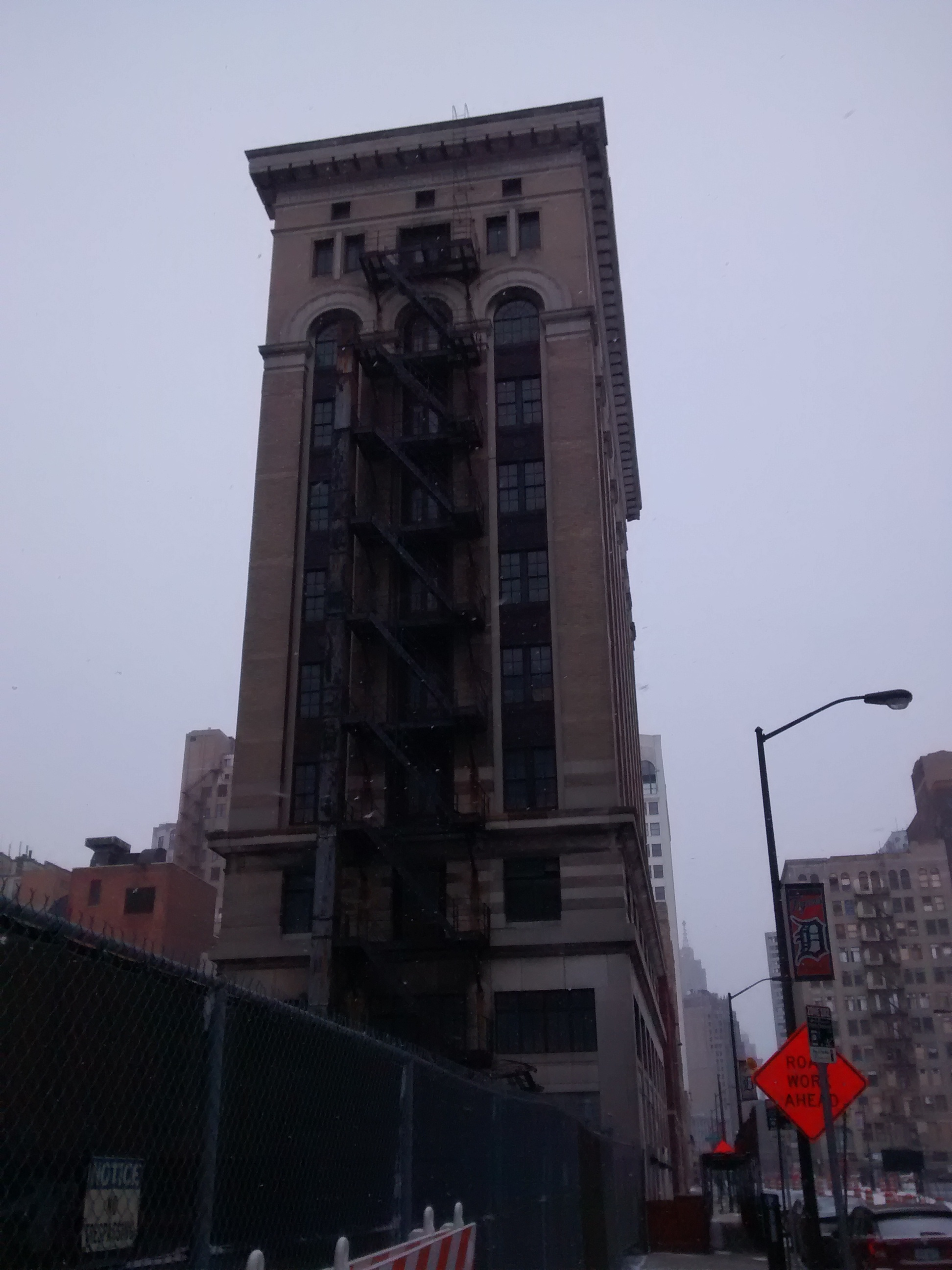
- Location: 2210 Park Avenue; Detroit, Michigan
- Coordinates: 42°20′14″N 83°3′10″W
- Built: 1923
- Architect: Arnold & Shreve
- Part of: Park Avenue Historic District (ID97000396)
- Designated CP: May 13, 1997

The Detroit Building is a high-rise office building located at 2210 Park Avenue, in Downtown Detroit, Michigan.

== Description ==
The building was constructed in 1923, and stands at 10 floors in height. It was designed in the Beaux-Arts architectural style.

- Architects: Arnold & Shreve
- The building was named originally named the Detroit Life Insurance Company Building after the building's main tenant, which occupied the top four floors.
- This building became part of the Park Avenue Historic District in 1997.

The building is to be renovated as part of the new hockey arena district announced in 2013.
