= United Artists Theatre Building =

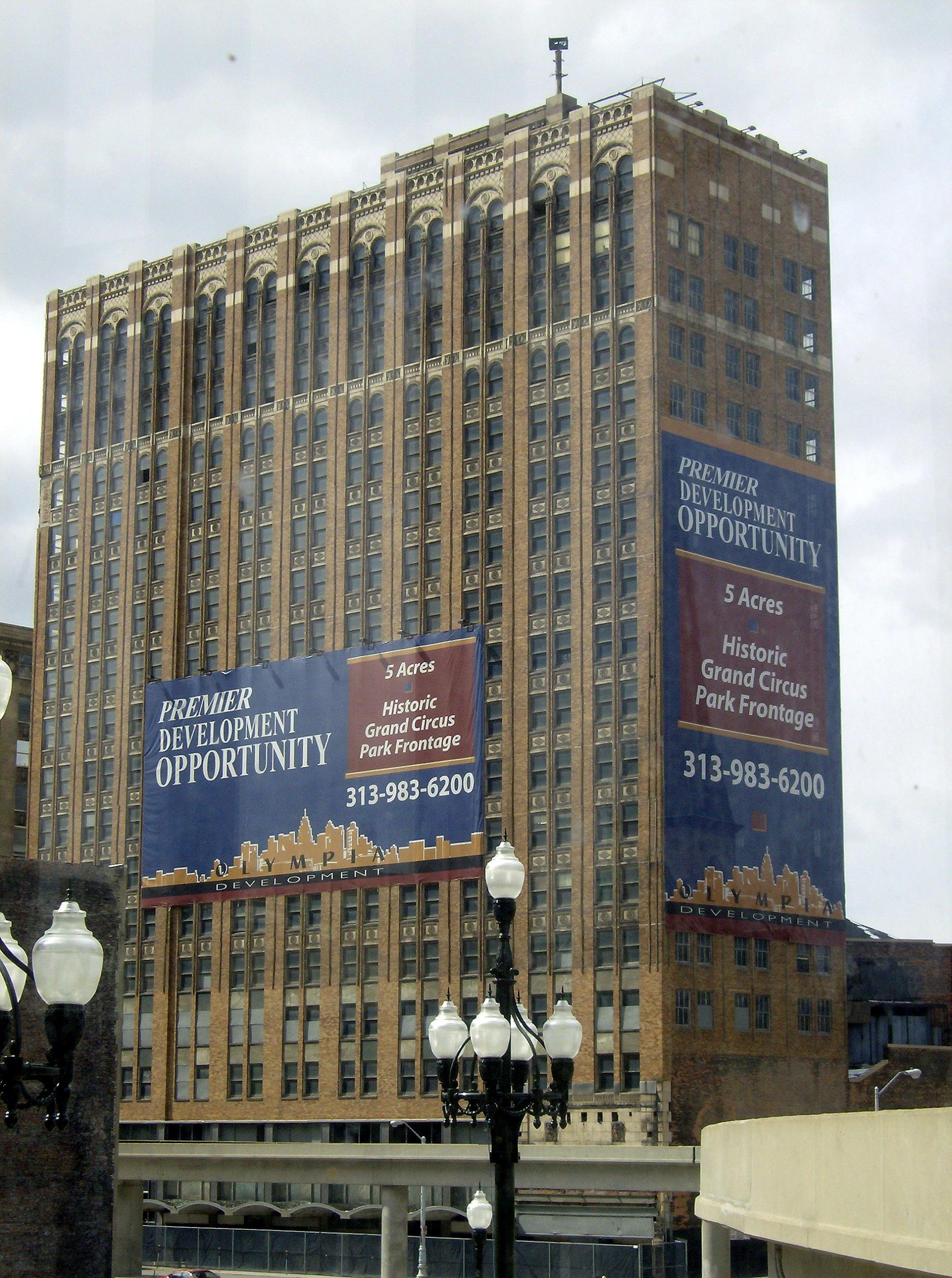
- Interactive map of the United Artists Theatre Building area

General information
- Type: Commercial offices proposed residential
- Location: 150 Bagley Street; Detroit, Michigan
- Coordinates: 42.335549°N 83.052328°W
- Completed: 1928

Height
- Roof: 230 ft (70 m)

Technical details
- Floor count: 18
- Floor area: 217,300 sq ft (20,190 m^{2})

Design and construction
- Architects: Charles Howard Crane; Elmer George Kiehler

The United Artists Theatre Building is a vacant high-rise tower in downtown Detroit, Michigan, standing at 150 Bagley Avenue. It was built in 1928 and stands 18 stories tall. The building was designed by architect C. Howard Crane in the renaissance revival architectural style, and is made mainly of brick. Until December 29, 1971, it was a first-run movie house and office space, and then after that, the theatre saw sporadic usage until 1973. The United Artists Theatre, designed in a Spanish-Gothic design, sat 2,070 people, and after closing served from 1978 to 1983 as the Detroit Symphony Orchestra's recording theater. After the theater closed, the office block struggled as tenants moved to suburbs. It finally closed in 1984. An original 10-story, vertical UA sign was replaced in the 1950s with a marquee that remained until 2005. The building once shared a lot with the now demolished Hotel Tuller.

In preparation for the 2006 NFL Super Bowl, graffiti was removed from all the windows of the building, and the lower levels received a coat of black paint to hide the graffiti work at the base of the building. The old theater marquee was also removed.

In 2006, Ilitch Holdings announced it would market the building. The company has a history of buying historic properties, voicing an intent to redevelop them, and later turning them into parking lots following increased decay.

As of 2023, the historic theatre is being restored and renovated into a large residential apartment building.
