= Detroit Women's City Club =

- Women's City Club
- U.S. National Register of Historic Places
- U.S. Historic district – Contributing property
- Michigan State Historic Site
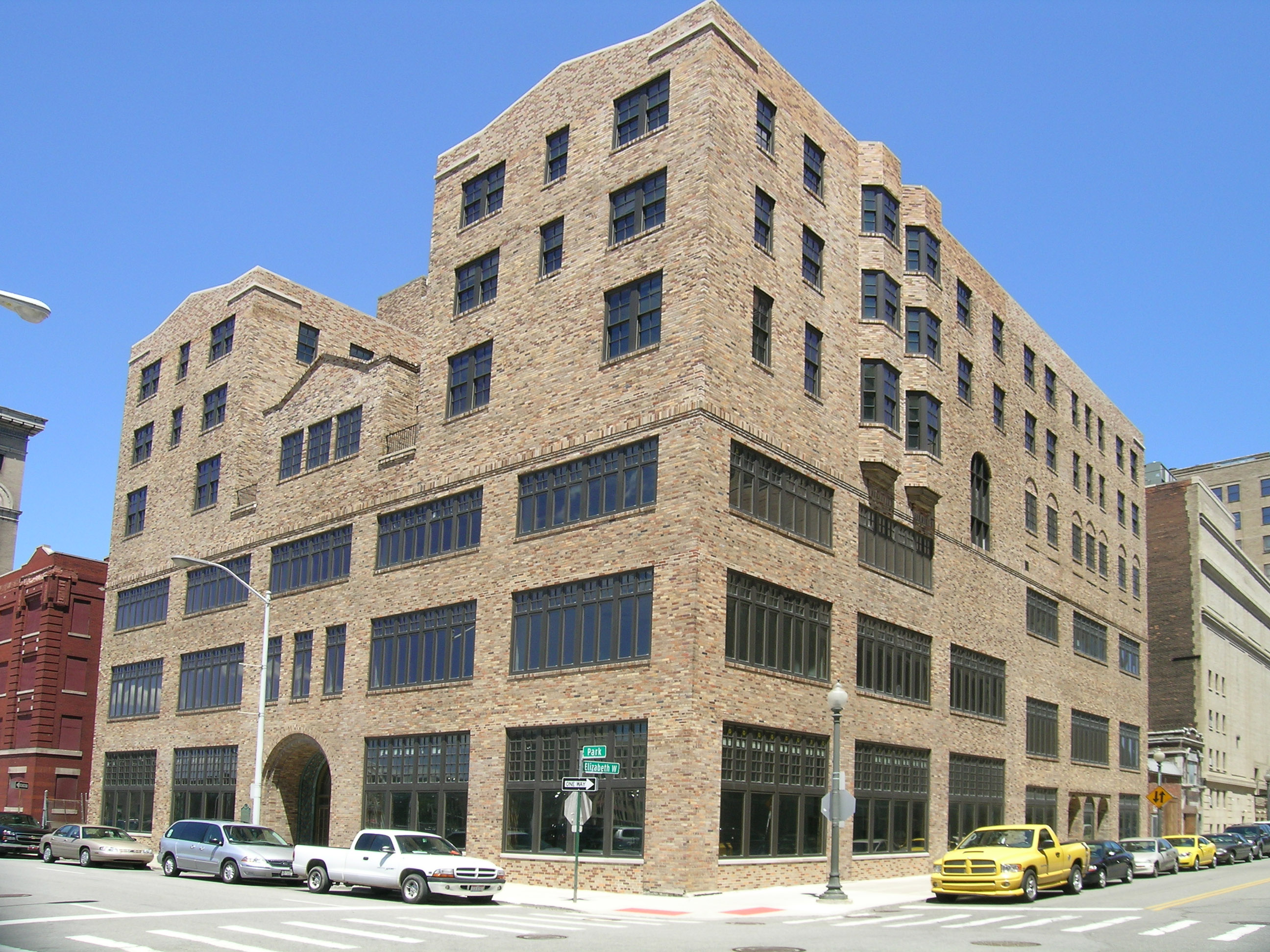
- Interactive map
- Location: 2110 Park Avenue; Detroit, Michigan
- Coordinates: 42°20′14″N 83°3′10″W
- Built: 1924
- Architect: William B. Stratton; Waldridge & Aldinger
- Architectural style: Arts and Crafts, Early Modern
- Part of: Park Avenue Historic District (ID97000396)
- NRHP reference No.: 79001179

Significant dates
- Added to NRHP: November 20, 1979
- Designated CP: May 13, 1997
- Designated MSHS: April 29, 1979

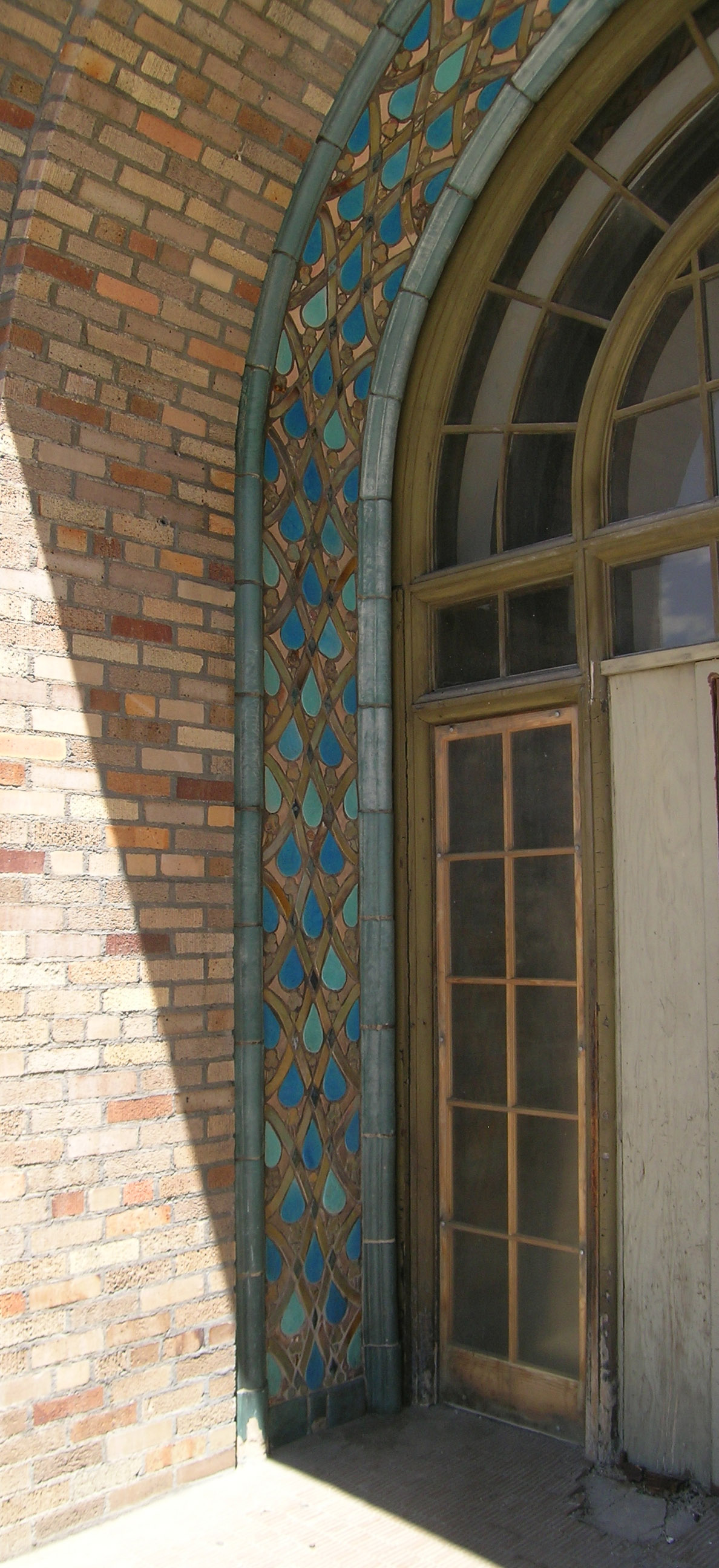
Tilework from Pewabic Pottery around front door of Women's City Club

The Women's City Club was a women's club located at 2110 Park Avenue in Downtown Detroit, Michigan, within the Park Avenue Historic District. It was listed on the National Register of Historic Places and designated a Michigan State Historic Site in 1979.

== History ==
Women's organizations became increasingly influential in the years after the American Civil War as a class of highly educated, middle class women arose in the nation. Their impact was at its peak in the years around World War I, when the 19th Amendment, guaranteeing women's suffrage, was ratified. In Detroit, it became apparent at that time that the many women's organizations in the city needed a centralized place to meet. In 1919, a number of local activists founded the "Women's City Club" to "promote a broad acquaintance among women." The club hired architect William B. Stratton (husband of ceramicist and club member Mary Chase Perry Stratton) to design a suitable building; the structure was completed in 1924.

== Description ==
The exterior of the building is built of brick, in a featureless modern style. The six stories are differentiated into the lower three floors, which are blocky and regular; and the three upper floors, which appear to be set onto the lower floors. The brick color differs between the two sections, as does the appearance of the windows. There is also a horizontal range of bricks between the two sections. The lower floors were designed to be meeting spaces for social events and planning the activities of members. The three upper floors were used as an apartments for women who moved to Detroit for employment and wished to live in a wholesome environment.

The interior decor was strongly influenced by the then-current Arts and Crafts movement, with hand-wrought ironwork and Pewabic Pottery tilework. The swimming pool was also decorated with Pewabic tile.

== Use ==
The City Club offered a number of classes and recreation programs for women, eventually enrolling over 8,000 members. However, membership declined after World War II, and in 1974 the club moved to smaller quarters. The social space was used for various purposes, including a restaurant and bar in later years. The building was bought in 1976 by Feminist Economic Network (FEN) and became Feminist City Club until debates about capitalism and access ended the project. The building was owned by Forbes Management until 2017 (also owners of the Elwood Bar, Gem Theater, and The Fillmore Detroit), and had received an upgrade of its façade. Forbes then sold the building an entity tied to Eric Larson and his development company, Larson Realty Group, who then sold it to an entity tied to Ilitch-owned Olympia Entertainment in 2017 for $5.85 million. Olympia Entertainment then announced the building would be renovated as part of the new Olympia development, the "District Detroit".
