= Eighth Precinct Police Station =

- U.S. National Register of Historic Places
- Michigan State Historic Site
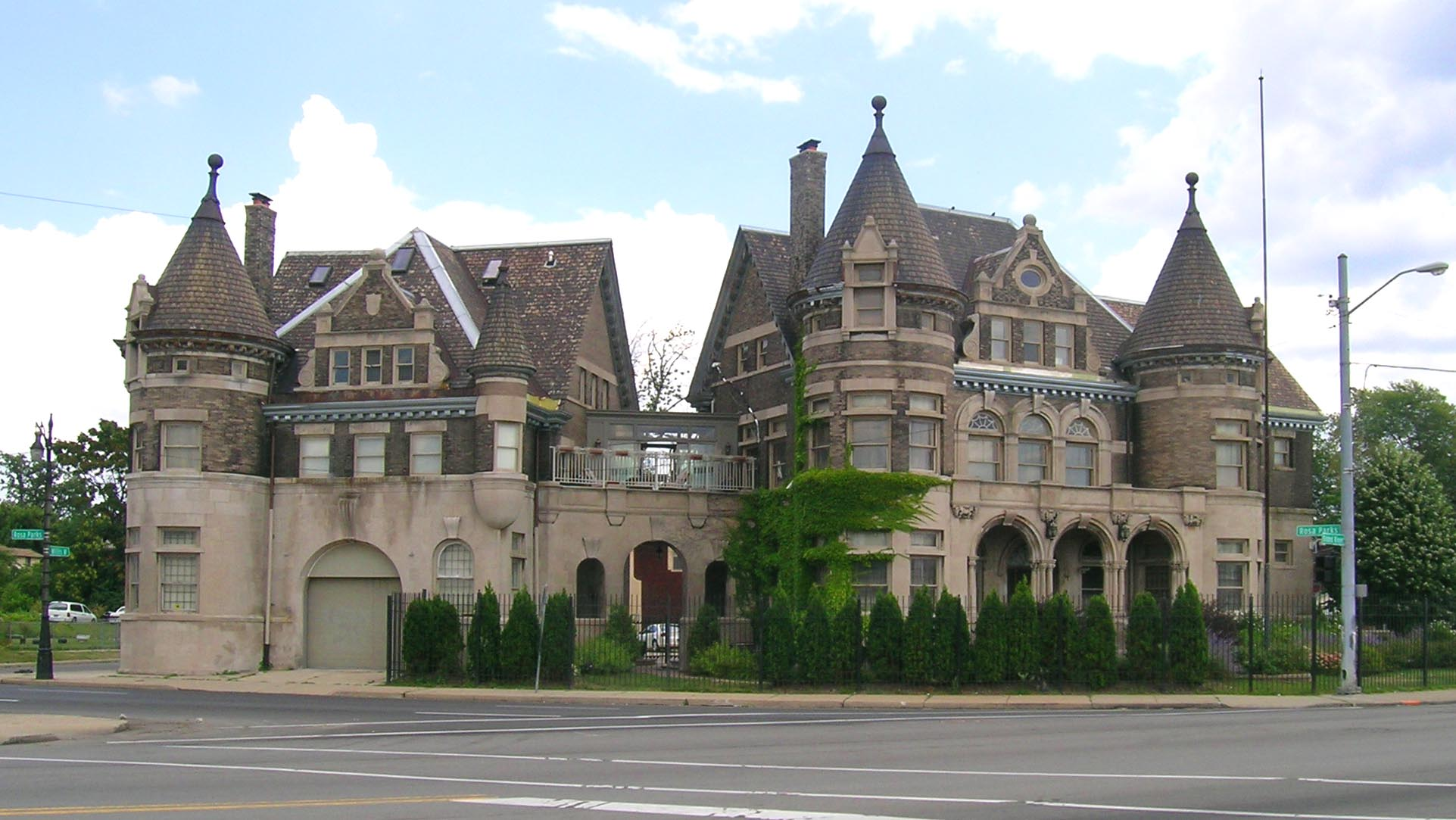

- Location within Michigan
- Interactive map
- Location: 4150 Grand River Avenue; Detroit, Michigan
- Coordinates: 42°20′42″N 83°4′46″W
- Built: 1900–01
- Architect: Louis Kamper
- Architectural style: Châteauesque
- NRHP reference No.: 74001001

Significant dates
- Added to NRHP: December 31, 1974
- Designated MSHS: November 15, 1973

The former Eighth Precinct Police Station is a building located at 4150 Grand River Avenue in the Woodbridge Historic District of Detroit, Michigan, United States. It is the second-oldest police building in Detroit, and was designated a Michigan State Historic Site in 1973 and listed on the National Register of Historic Places in 1974. The building now houses the Detroit Castle Lofts.

== History ==
As the west side of Detroit expanded in the late 1800s, city services followed. In 1873, a police precinct station was constructed at the corner of Michigan and Trumbull streets. This precinct, the Second, covered all of Detroit's west side beyond Fourth Street. As the area population increased, substations were constructed in the precinct, including, in 1879, a substation at the corner of what is now Grand River and Rosa Parks. This substation was demolished in 1900 to make way for the construction of the present building.

This building was designed by Louis Kamper and built between 1900 and 1901, for a cost of $46,000. In 1901, as part of a police department shakeup, the original Second Precinct headquarters on Trumbull was closed and this building on Grand River became the new Second Precinct Headquarters. In 1903, the Second Precinct was divided, and the Grand River station became the headquarters of the new Sixth Precinct. In 1910, precincts were renumbered citywide, and the area became the Eighth Precinct. This station remained in service until 1954, when the precinct was closed.

After 1954, the Detroit Police Youth Bureau used the station as office space; the buildings were later used by the Detroit Police Personnel Division. In the 1980s, the Special Crimes Section moved in. The section included the Major Crimes Mobile Unit and the Gang Squad. In 2013, the building was converted to lofts, as part of the ongoing revitalization of Woodbridge.

== Architecture ==
Kamper designed the French Renaissance Châteauesque station as two structures connected by an arcade. The main building, used as office space, is a 2 1/2-story structure measuring seventy-two feet long by forty-five feet wide. The smaller building, initially used as a carriage house and later as a garage, is also a 2 1/2-story structure, and measures forty-six feet long by thirty feet wide. Both buildings are constructed of limestone on the first floor and brick on the second, and feature high pitched roofs, conically roofed towers, and elaborate stone dentils which give the impression, especially on the towers, of castle battlements.

The main entrance to the station is through a covered stone porch framed by three semi-circular arches supported by columns. A stone balustrade spans the porch. Six faces of individuals significant at the time the building was constructed decorate the capitals: Governor Hazen Pingree, Detroit mayor William Maybury and the four men who made up the Detroit Police Commission. Two conical roofed towers, flank the entrance. The windows in the towers have transoms and stone lintels, and the highest window in each tower features an elaborate stone hood-moulding. A wall dormer on the second story contains three rectangular windows with a circular window above, outlined in stone, framing a Maltese Cross.

The garage has a full tower on the western corner which is identical to the two on the main building. The main door is a double door with a semi-circular arch. The wall dormer on the second story is similar to that on the main building, but without the circular window above.
