= Hotel Tuller =

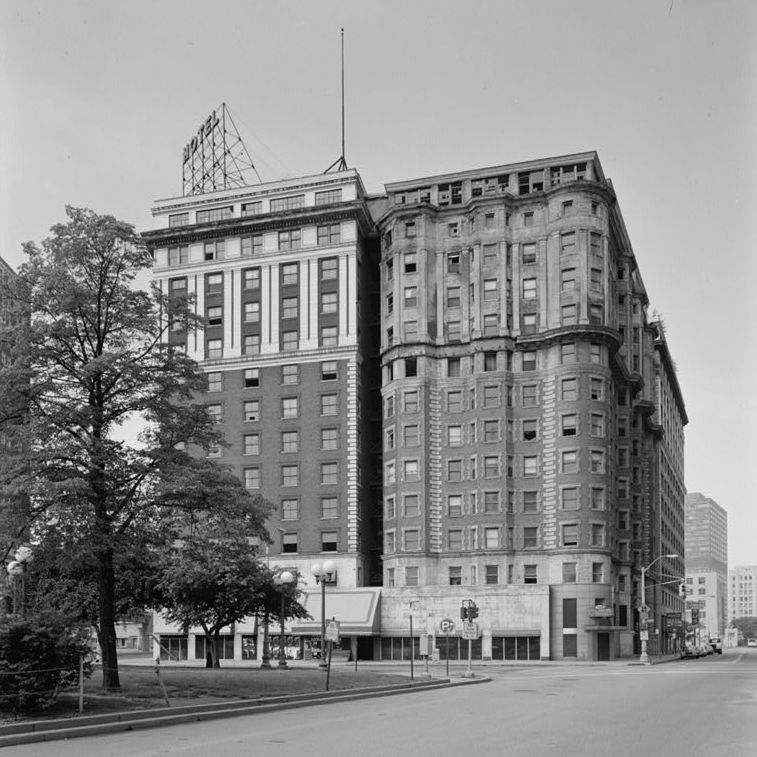
- Hotel Tuller, c. 1992
- Interactive map of the Hotel Tuller area

General information
- Status: Demolished
- Type: Hotel
- Location: Adams Avenue West, Bagley Street, and Park Avenue; Detroit, Michigan
- Coordinates: 42.3361°N 83.0522°W
- Completed: 1906, 1910 (first addition), 1914 (second add.), 1923 (third add.)
- Demolished: 1991

Technical details
- Floor count: 14

Design and construction
- Architect: William H. Adams (third addition)
- Hotel Tuller
- U.S. Historic district – Contributing property
- Part of: Grand Circus Park Historic District (ID83000894)
- Designated CP: February 28, 1983

The Hotel Tuller once stood at Adams Avenue West, Bagley Street, and Park Avenue across from Grand Circus Park in downtown Detroit, Michigan. It was one of the largest luxury hotels in Detroit, the first erected in the Grand Circus Park Historic District and known as the "grand dame of Grand Circus Park". Composer Gerald Marks' Hotel Tuller Orchestra was based here and contributed to Columbia Records' success in the mid-1920s. The site is now the location of a parking lot next to the United Artists Theatre Building.

== History ==
The Hotel Tuller was originally constructed in 1906 by Lew Whiting Tuller. The hotel originally had nine floors; five additional floors were added in 1910. A 14-story annex was added to the southeast of the original building in 1914, and it was a popular site for conventions and banquets. A final addition to the west was made in 1923, bringing the room count to 800, each with a private bath. The hotel's Arabian Room was the largest ballroom in Detroit, with a capacity of 600 people.

Starting in the early 1920s, the Tuller had a difficult time competing with other Detroit hotels, most notably the Statler Hotel and the newly built Book-Cadillac Hotel. In 1927 the Tuller went bankrupt; a 1928 plan to demolish the structure and replace it with a 35-story, 1,500-room Biltmore hotel was abandoned due to the Great Depression. In 1940, the former boxer Kid McCoy was found dead in his room in the hotel. The Tuller was purchased by new owners in 1944, and experienced a complete makeover; the lobby was renovated by the architectural firm of C. Howard Crane. In 1959, a fire at the hotel killed 3 people, who were trapped in an elevator when a fire broke out in the lobby.

The hotel fell into disrepair and was shuttered in 1976 after having been a low-end, extended-stay property. The city of Detroit deemed this building beyond repair, demolished it in 1991, and the site has remained a parking lot ever since.

== Lew Tuller ==
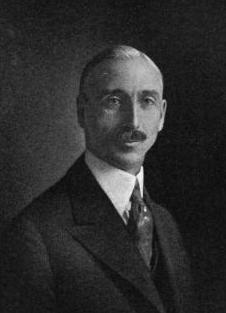
Lew W. Tuller

Lew Whiting Tuller was born in Jonesville, Michigan in 1869. His father was an architect and builder, and when he finished his schooling, Lew joined his father in business. He moved to Detroit in 1894, and built a number of apartment houses and other buildings in the city. Tuller built the hotel that bears his name in 1906, and, being unable to lease the building, he began running it as a hotel himself. His foray into hotel management was successful, and he built three other hotels in Detroit: the Eddystone, Park Avenue, and the Royal Palm.

The increasing competition among Detroit hotels, combined with the financial instability of the late 1920s and with a series of unsuccessful real estate deals operated by Tuller, caused him to lose his empire: the Eddystone and the Royal Palm Hotels were foreclosed in 1928, and Lew Tuller went so far as to conceal himself, in a desperate attempt to prevent the Hotel Tuller from entering receivership.

Lew Tuller died in Pontiac, Michigan in 1957, at the age of 88.

== Gallery ==
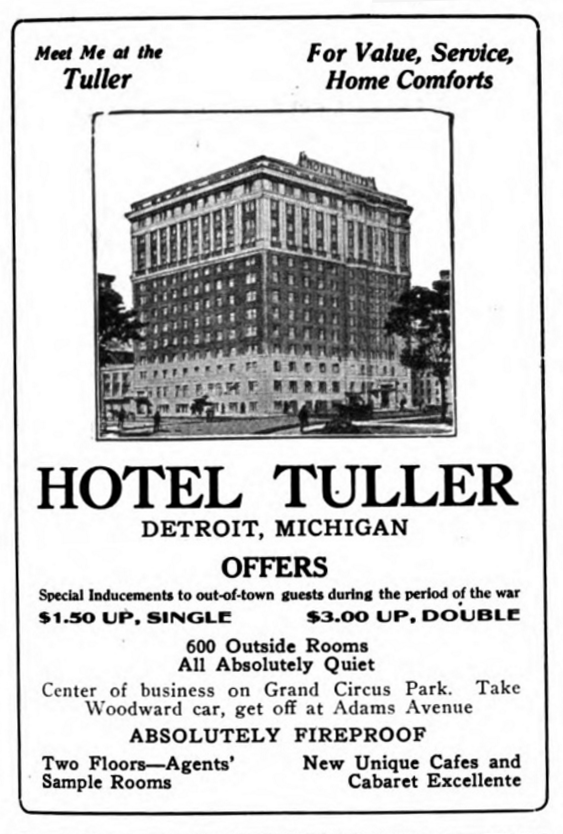
Advertisement for the Hotel Tuller, 1918

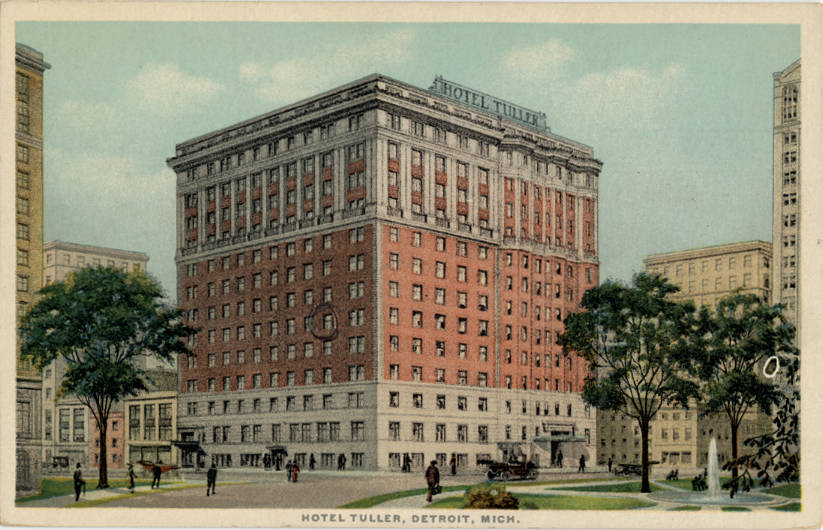
The Hotel Tuller in a postcard, circa 1910s

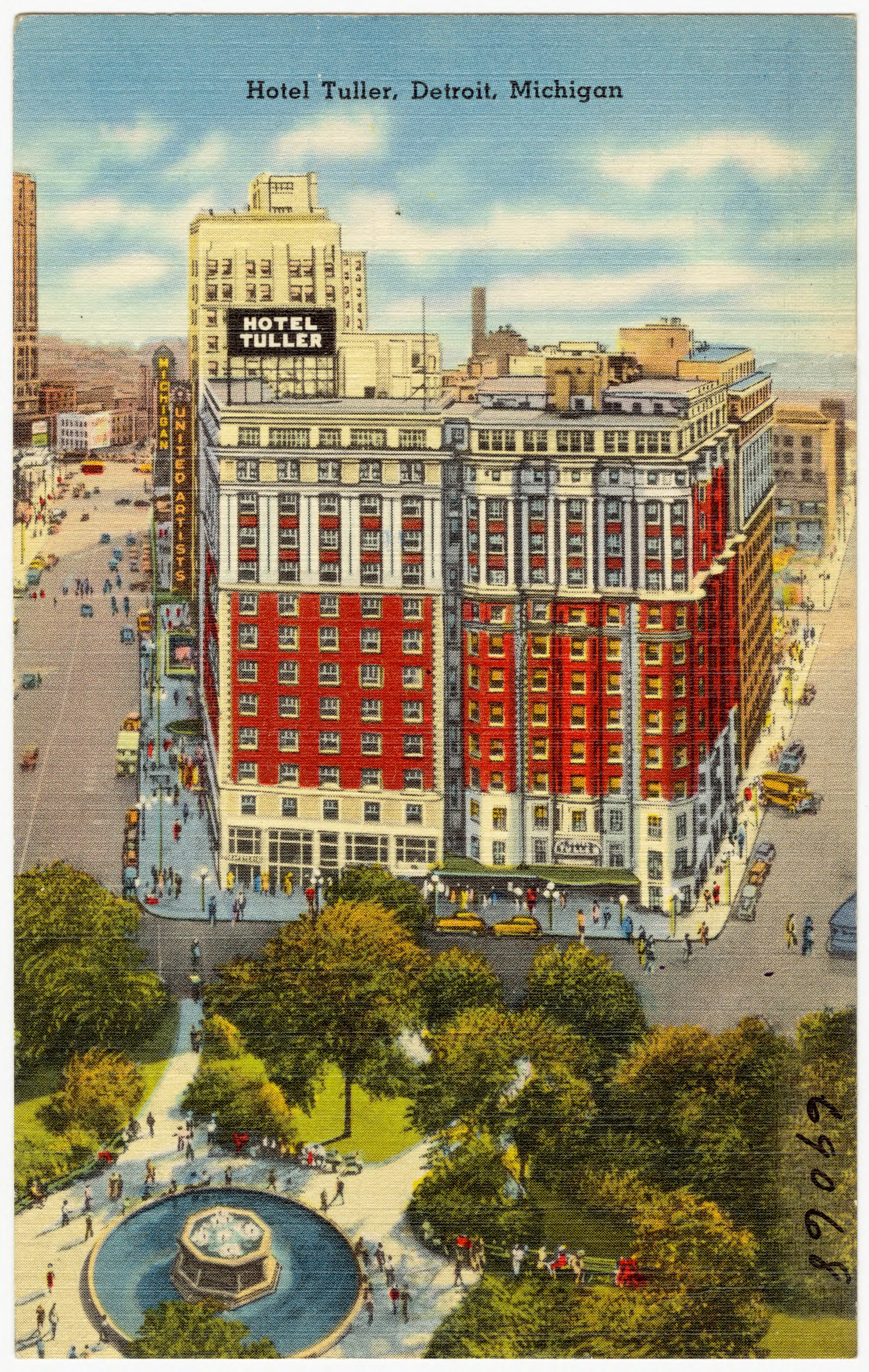
The Hotel Tuller in an old postcard

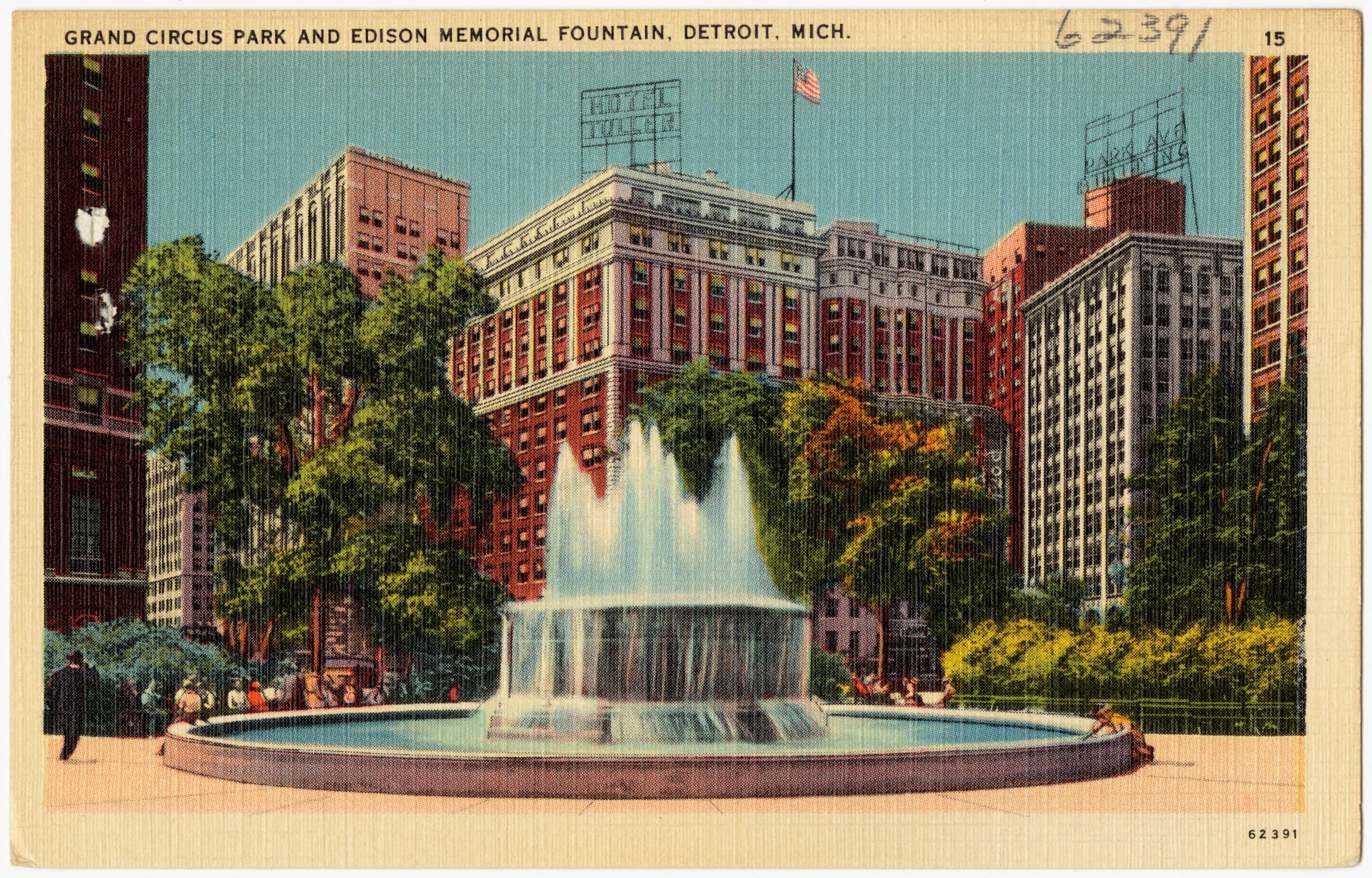
Postcard showing the Thomas Edison Memorial Fountain. The Hotel Tuller is visible in the background
