= Park Avenue House =

- Royal Palm Hotel
- U.S. National Register of Historic Places
- U.S. Historic district – Contributing property
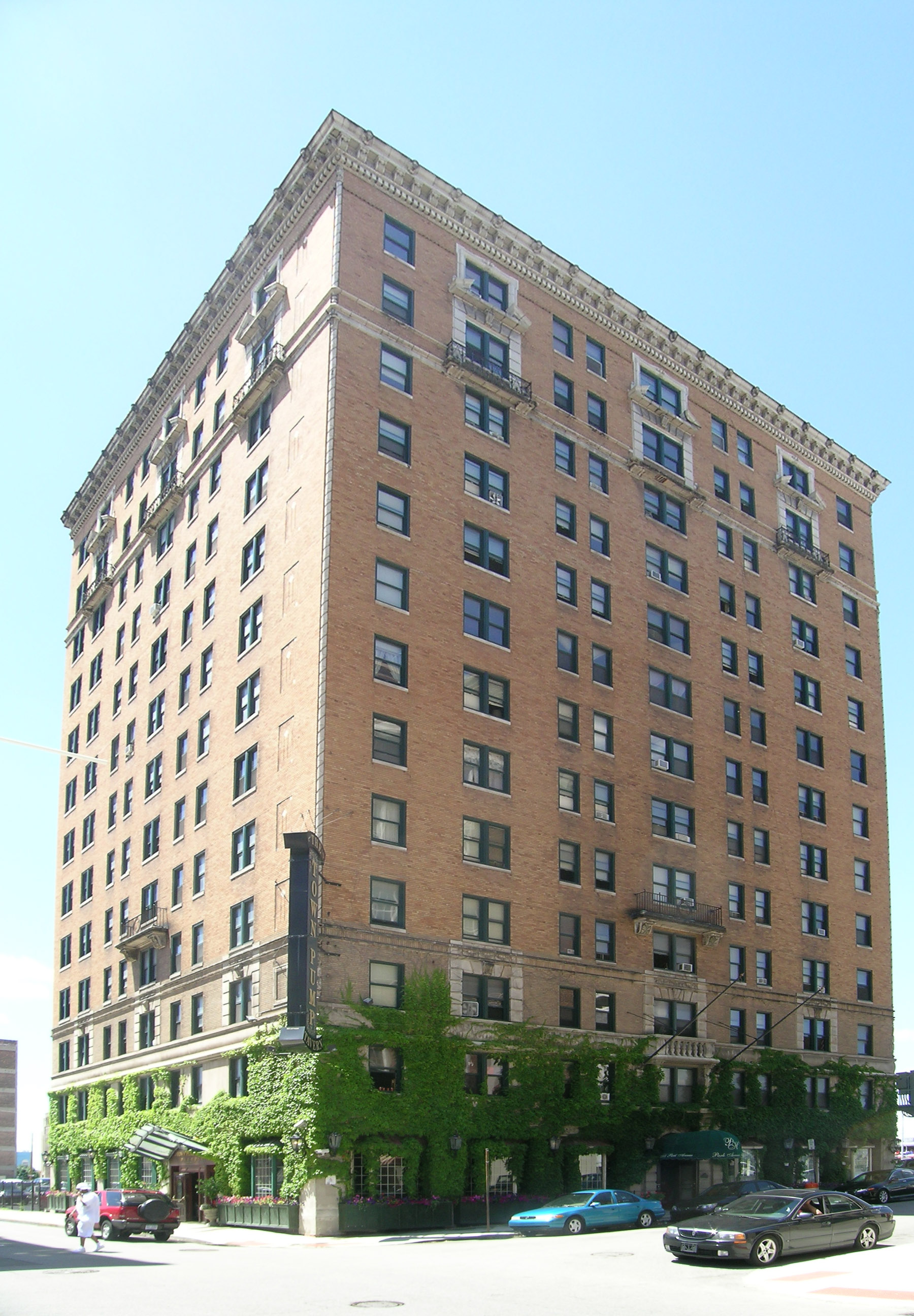
- View from the southeast
- Interactive map
- Location: 2305 Park Avenue; Detroit, Michigan
- Coordinates: 42°20′18″N 83°3′16″W
- Built: 1924
- Architect: Louis Kamper
- Architectural style: Italian Renaissance
- Part of: Park Avenue Historic District (ID97000396)
- NRHP reference No.: 96000812

Significant dates
- Added to NRHP: July 25, 1996
- Designated CP: May 13, 1997

The Park Avenue House is a high rise residential building located at 2305 Park Avenue in the Park Avenue Historic District in Downtown Detroit, Michigan. It was listed on the National Register of Historic Places in 1996. It should not be confused with the nearby Park Avenue Hotel, which was demolished in 2015.

== Significance ==
Formerly known as the Royal Palm Hotel, it is one of three hotels located on Park Avenue and designed by Louis Kamper for Lew Tuller; the other two are the Eddystone at 100 Sproat St. and the Park Avenue Hotel at 2643 Park Avenue (demolished in 2015). All three are on the National Register of Historic Places.

The Royal Palm was designed by Louis Kamper and built in 1924 for Lew Tuller. Tuller had erected the Hotel Tuller in 1907, and the success of that enterprise led him to build the three Park Avenue hotels in 1924. When constructed, the Royal Palm contained 180 rooms with baths, a restaurant, and five retail spaces on the first floor. However, Tuller overextended himself financially, and in 1928 lost all three Park Avenue hotels in foreclosure. The Royal Palm and the Eddystone were purchased by David P. Katz. Katz owned the building until 1966, when his business empire collapsed.

The Royal Palm, confusingly, took the name of the Park Avenue Hotel at some point. It is the oldest hotel in the downtown Detroit area, and operated continuously as a hotel until its conversion to a high-rise residential building. In 1967 Wilbur Harrington purchased the hotel from Katz and renamed it Park Avenue House. In 1990 Wilbur transferred ownership to his son, Sean Harrington, who continues to operate it.

== Description ==
The Royal Palm is a thirteen-story brick and masonry hotel with Italian Renaissance details. It is located within the Park Avenue Historic District; the entrance faces Park Avenue. Although the building has undergone some alterations, it is generally in excellent condition. The Town Pump Tavern is located on the ground floor of the building. The front facade is symmetrical, with seven bays with double hung windows. The facade is of orange brick, with limestone on the first two floors. Different window treatment draw attention to the first, second, fourth, eleventh and twelfth floors. The main entrance in through an arched doorway, with rusticated pilasters surmounted by a Doric frieze. Directly above the doorway the central windows are flanked by two feminine termini; on the third floor is a balustraded window balconet. The building features unusual packeted bay windows.

On the interior, the small entry vestibule has marble walls and shell patterned iron grates. A groin vaulted hallway with wall-mounted medieval iron lighting fixtures leads to the main lobby. The lobby has oak wainscoting and an oak reception counter in one corner. The hallway also leads to two commercial spaces, modified and enlarged from the original five commercial spaces. On the upper floors, the original floor plan had 15 single rooms on each floor. Some units have been connected to create larger spaces, decreasing the number of apartments to 13 per floor.
