= Louis Kamper =

American architect (1861–1953)

- Born: March 11, 1861; Kingdom of Bavaria
- Died: February 24, 1953 (aged 91); Grosse Pointe, Michigan
- Occupation: Architect
- Practice: McKim, Mead, and White, Scott & Scott

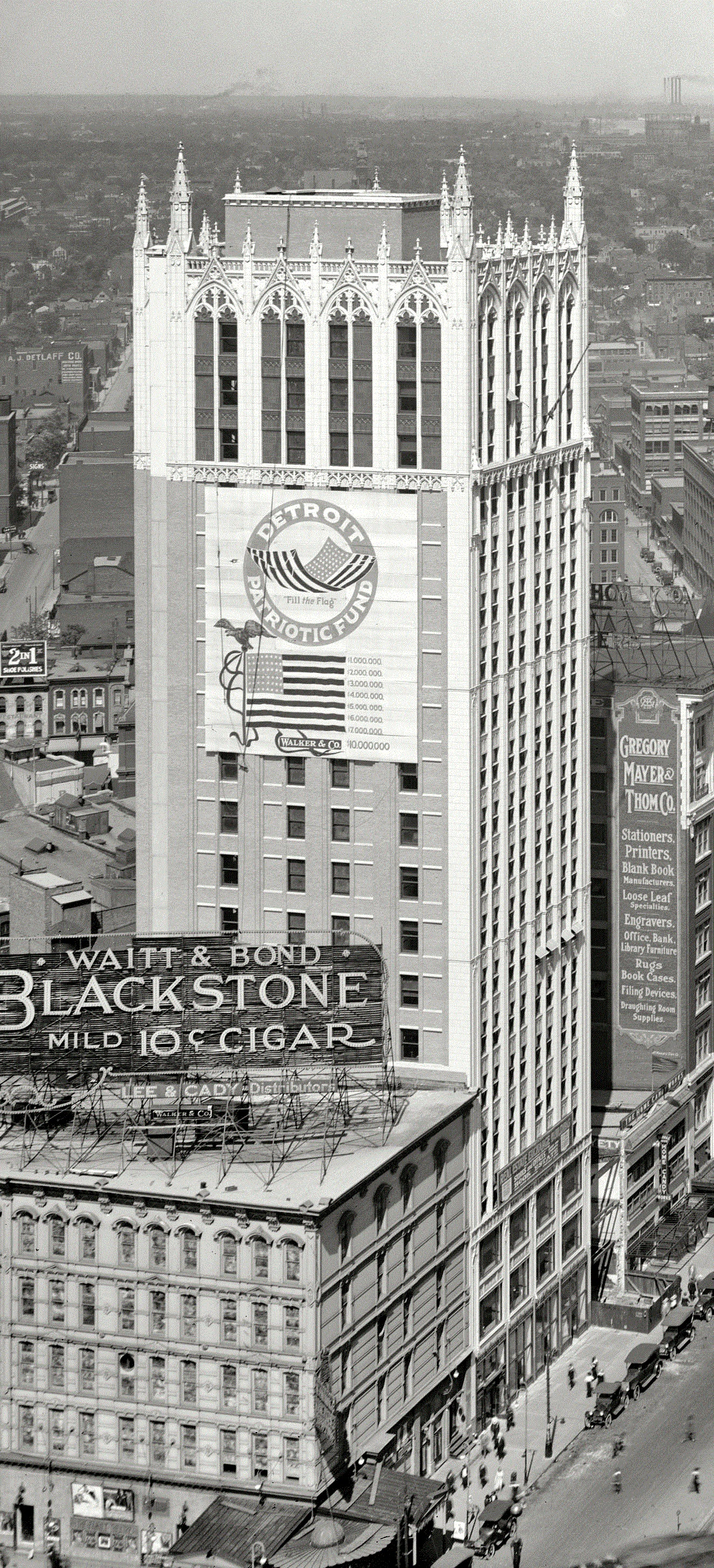
Cadillac Square Building, 1918 (demolished)

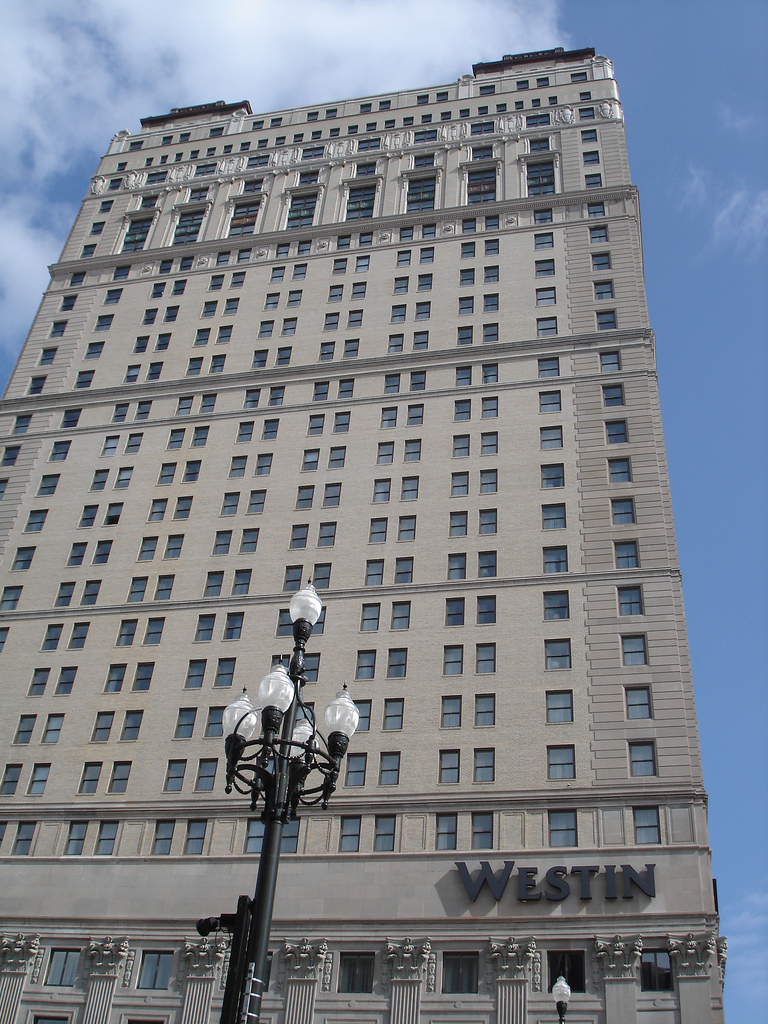
Book-Cadillac Hotel, 1924

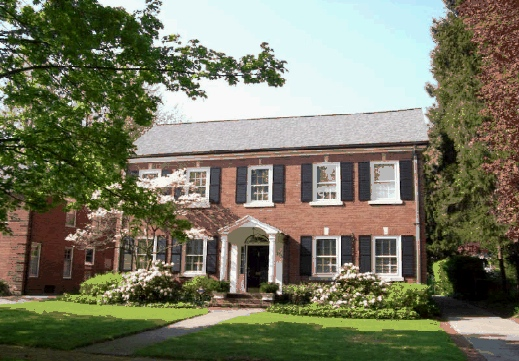
Sutton Residence, Grosse Pointe, Michigan, 1931

Louis Kamper (March 11, 1861 – February 24, 1953) was an American architect, active in and around Detroit and Wayne County, Michigan, in the United States.

== Project range ==
In the early 20th century, with the major development of Detroit's Washington Boulevard launched by the Book brothers, Louis Kamper was called to redesign the street wall of the area. As a result, the boulevard is now lined with several Kamper-designed buildings: the Book Building (1916), the Washington Boulevard Building (1922–23), the Book-Cadillac Hotel (1924), the Book Tower (1926), and the Industrial Building (1928). Other downtown works include the Cadillac Square Building (1918), demolished in 1978, and the Water Board Building (1928), one of his finest skyscrapers.

His residential architectural projects include the Châteauesque style Col. Frank J. Hecker House in Detroit, and the Italian Renaissance Revival style Murray Sales House (1917) in Grosse Pointe, Michigan. (Note: The Murray Sales House, located at 251 Lincoln Road in Grosse Pointe, was later altered from the original design.)

Louis Kamper styled the four architectural sculptures above the Michigan Avenue entrance to the Book-Cadillac Hotel which are, from left to right: Anthony Wayne, Antoine Cadillac, Chief Pontiac, and Robert Navarre.

== Kamper-designed buildings ==
All buildings are located in Detroit, unless otherwise indicated.

Buildings designed by Louis Kamper include:

- Col. Frank J. Hecker House, 1888–1892
- Marvin M. Stanton Home ("The Castle"), 1898
- Detroit International Fair and Exposition Building, 1889 (structure made entirely of wood)
- Hugo Scherer summer home, 1898
- Eighth Precinct Police Station, 1900–01
- Frederick Chambe, 1897–1898
- Frank J. Hecker, 1900
- Bloomer and Nellie Gill House, Galion, Ohio, 1902–1903
- Austin E. Morey, building permit issued 8/18/1903, finished 1904
- Arthur E. Barker, building permit issued 12/14/1908, finished 1910
- Cornelius Ray Mansion, building permit issued 11/12/1909, finished 1910
- James Burgess Book Mansion, building permit issued 9/1/1910, finished 1911
- George E Lawson Residence, building permit issued 10/9/1912, finished 1913
- Herman Darmstaetter, 1913
- Roseland Park Mausoleum, 1914
- August P. Kling, building permit issued 12/9/1914, finished 1915
- Frank B. Melin, 1915
- Book Building, 1916
- Murray Sales House, Grosse Pointe, Michigan, 1917
- Kamper Residence, building permit issued 4/23/1915, finished 1917
- C. Henry Haberkorn, 1917
- Cadillac Square Building, 1918 (demolished, 1978)
- Henry Wiegert, 1921
- Kurt Kling, 1921
- Clarence J. McLeod, 1922
- Herbert V. Book Jr., 1921–1922
- Louis N. Hilsendegen, 1922
- Washington Boulevard Building, 1922–23
- Carlton Plaza Hotel, 1923 (renovated into The Carlton Lofts)
- Book-Cadillac Hotel, 1924 - four sculptures above the Michigan Avenue entrance
- Park Avenue House, 1924
- Eddystone Building, 1924
- Park Avenue Hotel, 1924 (demolished 2015)
- Book Tower (adjacent to the Book Building), 1926 (Note: A 1929 project for an even taller, 81-story New Book Tower remained unbuilt due to the advent of the Great Depression.)
- Consolidated Bank Building, 1926
- Industrial Building, 1928
- Water Board Building, 1928
- David Broderick Tower (formerly the Eaton Tower), 1928
- Higgins Elementary School, Detroit Public Schools, 1930
- Sutton Residence, 1931 - 175 Merriweather, Grosse Pointe Farms, Michigan
- Charles W. Kotcher House, 1914
