= Hantz Group =

American business financial services conglomerate

- Industry: financial services
- Founder: John Hantz
- Headquarters: Southfield, Michigan United States
- Area served: Michigan; Ohio
- Services: banking casualty insurance financial planning estate planning tax services
- Website: www.hantzgroup.com

Hantz Group is an American business financial services conglomerate founded by John Hantz and headquartered in Southfield, Michigan. with offerings including banking, casualty insurance, financial planning, estate planning, and tax services.

== History ==
Hantz Group was founded by businessman John Hantz in 1998. The company expanded through a group of affiliated financial-services businesses operating in investment management, insurance, tax planning, and retirement services.

=== Hantz Farms ===
During the 2010s, the company and its affiliates received national attention for the Hantz Woodlands project in Detroit, an urban forestry initiative involving the purchase and redevelopment of vacant city lots. It would be the largest urban farm in the U.S.

=== Expansion and mergers ===
In 2011, the company expanded to Ann Arbor. In 2019, subsidiary group, Hantz Bank, was acquired by and merged with Credit Union ONE.
