= Women's suffrage in the United States =

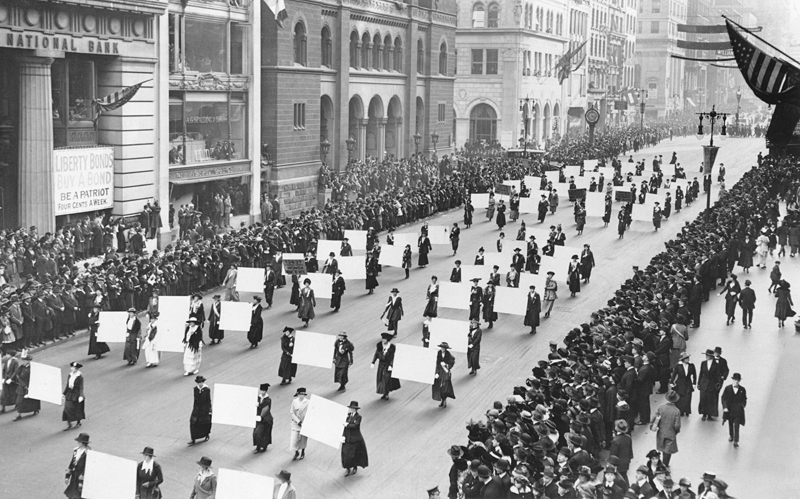
Women's suffragists parade in New York City in 1917, carrying placards with the signatures of more than a million women.

Women's suffrage, or the right of women to vote, was established in the United States over the course of the late 19th and early 20th centuries, first in various states and localities, then nationally in 1920 with the ratification of the 19th Amendment to the United States Constitution.

The demand for women's suffrage began to gather strength in the 1840s, emerging from the broader movement for women's rights. In 1848, the Seneca Falls Convention, the first women's rights convention, passed a resolution in favor of women's suffrage despite opposition from some of its organizers, who believed the idea was too extreme. By the time of the first National Women's Rights Convention in 1850, however, suffrage was becoming an increasingly important aspect of the movement's activities.

The first national suffrage organizations were established in 1869 when two competing organizations were formed, one led by Susan B. Anthony and Elizabeth Cady Stanton and the other by Lucy Stone and Frances Ellen Watkins Harper. After years of rivalry, they merged in 1890 as the National American Woman Suffrage Association (NAWSA) with Anthony as its leading figure. The Women's Christian Temperance Union (WCTU), which was the largest women's organization at that time, was established in 1873 and also pursued women's suffrage, giving a huge boost to the movement.

Hoping that the U.S. Supreme Court would rule that women had a constitutional right to vote, suffragists made several attempts to vote in the early 1870s and then filed lawsuits when they were turned away. Anthony actually succeeded in voting in 1872 but was arrested for that act and found guilty in a widely publicized trial that gave the movement fresh momentum. After the Supreme Court ruled against them in the 1875 case Minor v. Happersett, suffragists began the decades-long campaign for an amendment to the U.S. Constitution that would enfranchise women. Much of the movement's energy, however, went toward working for suffrage on a state-by-state basis. These efforts included pursuing office-holding rights separately in an effort to bolster their argument in favor of voting rights.

The first state to grant women the right to vote was Wyoming in 1869. This was followed by Utah in 1870; Colorado in 1893; Idaho in 1896; Washington in 1910; California in 1911; Oregon and Arizona in 1912; Illinois in 1913; Montana in 1914; North Dakota, New York, and Rhode Island in 1917; Louisiana, Oklahoma, and Michigan in 1918.

In 1916, Alice Paul formed the National Woman's Party (NWP), a group focused on the passage of a national suffrage amendment. Over 200 NWP supporters, the Silent Sentinels, were arrested in 1917 while picketing the White House, some of whom went on hunger strike and endured forced feeding after being sent to prison. Under the leadership of Carrie Chapman Catt, the two-million-member NAWSA also made a national suffrage amendment its top priority. After a hard-fought series of votes in the U.S. Congress and in state legislatures, the Nineteenth Amendment became part of the U.S. Constitution on August 18, 1920. It states, "The right of citizens of the United States to vote shall not be denied or abridged by the United States or by any State on account of sex."

== National history ==
=== Background ===
Most of the early U.S. states, continuing in their pre-Revolutionary War traditions as British colonies, adopted constitutions that expressly denied women the right to vote. The basis for this practice was rooted in traditional societal views and legal doctrines. During the Middle Ages, the English common law adopted the doctrine of coverture, which held that a married woman was a "feme covert" with no legal personhood of her own and who was legally considered indistinct from her husband.

=== Early voting activity ===
Lydia Taft (1712–1778), a wealthy widow, was allowed to vote in town meetings in Uxbridge, Massachusetts in 1756. No other women in the colonial era are known to have voted.

The New Jersey constitution of 1776 enfranchised all adult inhabitants who owned a specified amount of property. Laws enacted in 1790 and 1797 referred to voters as "he or she", and women regularly voted. A law passed in 1807, however, excluded women from voting in that state.

Kentucky passed the first statewide woman suffrage law in the antebellum era (since New Jersey revoked their woman suffrage rights in 1807) in 1838 – allowing voting by any widow or feme sole (legally, the head of household) over 21 who resided in and owned property subject to taxation for the new county's "common school" system. These partial suffrage rights for women were not expressed as for whites only.

=== Emergence of the women's rights movement ===
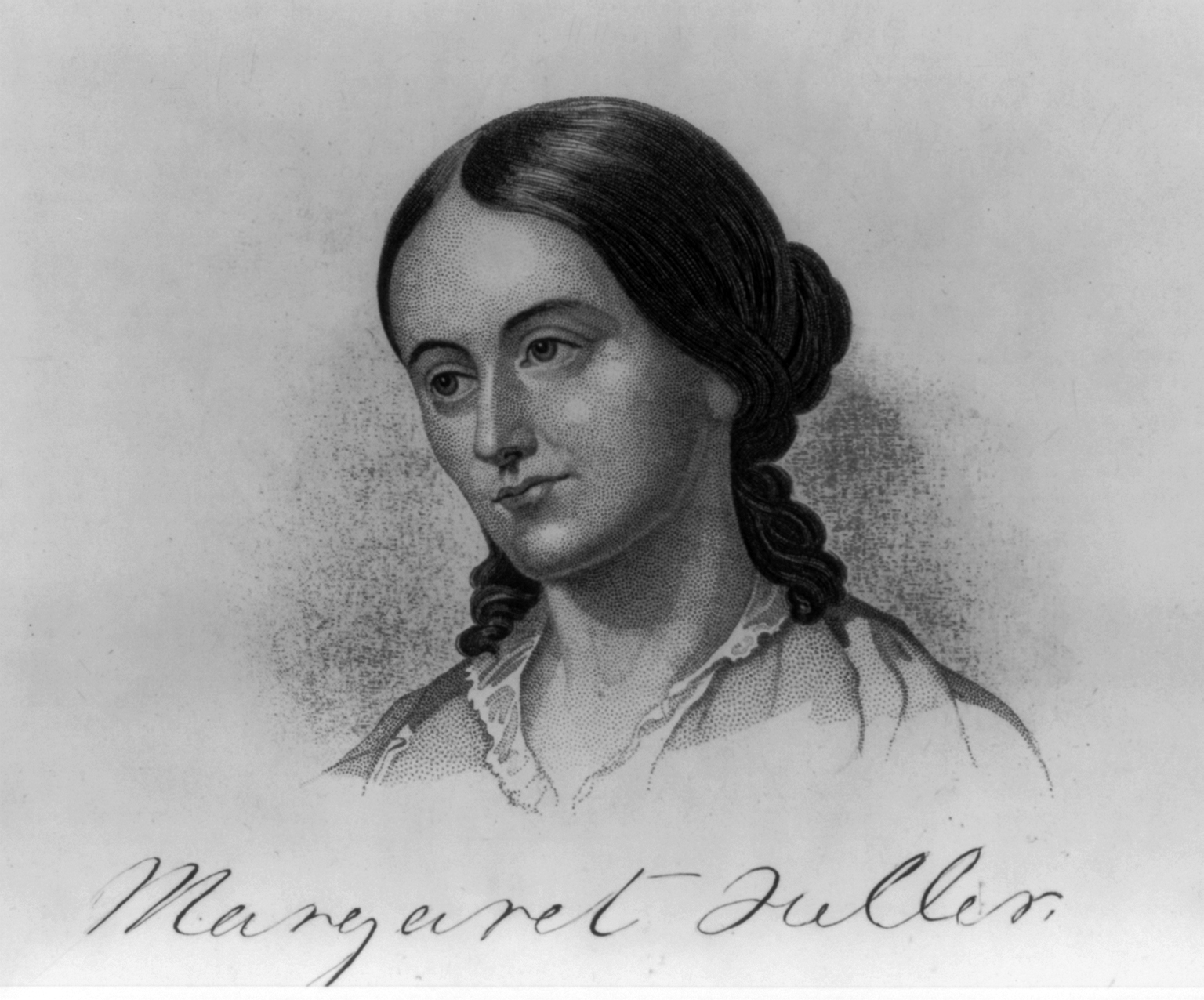
Margaret Fuller

The demand for women's suffrage emerged as part of the broader movement for women's rights. In the UK in 1792, Mary Wollstonecraft wrote a pioneering book called A Vindication of the Rights of Woman. American John Neal advocated women's suffrage in an 1823 speech in Baltimore, an 1824 essay in Blackwood's Edinburgh Magazine, an 1832 speech in Portland, Maine, and an 1843 speech in New York City, later published in Brother Jonathan to reach a wider audience. In Boston in 1838 Sarah Grimké published The Equality of the Sexes and the Condition of Women, which was widely circulated. In 1845, Margaret Fuller published Woman in the Nineteenth Century, a key document in American feminism that first appeared in serial form in 1839 in The Dial, a transcendentalist journal that Fuller edited.

The very truths you are now contending for, will, in fifty years, be so completely imbedded in public opinion that no one need say one word in their defense; whilst at the same time new forms of truth will arise to test the faithfulness of the pioneer minds of that age, and so on eternally.

— Angela Grimké, 1851, in a letter to Elizabeth Cady Stanton

Significant barriers had to be overcome, however, before a campaign for women's suffrage could develop significant strength. One barrier was strong opposition to women's involvement in public affairs, a practice that was not fully accepted even among reform activists. Only after fierce debate were women accepted as members of the American Anti-Slavery Society at its convention of 1839, and the organization split at its next convention when women were appointed to committees.

Opposition was especially strong to the idea of women speaking to audiences of both men and women. Frances Wright, a Scottish woman, was subjected to sharp criticism for delivering public lectures in the U.S. in 1826 and 1827. When the Grimké sisters, who had been born into a slave-holding family in South Carolina, spoke against slavery throughout the northeast in the mid-1830s, the ministers of the Congregational Church, a major force in that region, published a statement condemning their actions. In 1838, despite widespread disapproval, Angelina Grimké became the first woman in the U.S. to address a legislative body when she spoke against slavery before the Massachusetts legislature.

Other women began to give public speeches, especially in opposition to slavery and in support of women's rights. Early female speakers included Ernestine Rose, a Jewish immigrant from Poland; Lucretia Mott, a Quaker minister and abolitionist; and Abby Kelley Foster, a Quaker abolitionist. Toward the end of the 1840s, Lucy Stone launched her career as a public speaker, soon becoming the most famous female lecturer. Supporting both the abolitionist and women's rights movements, Stone played a major role in reducing the prejudice against women speaking in public.

Opposition remained strong, however. A regional women's rights convention in Ohio in 1851 was disrupted by male opponents. Sojourner Truth, who delivered her famous speech "Ain't I a Woman?" at the convention, directly addressed some of this opposition in her speech. The National Women's Rights Convention in 1852 was also disrupted, and mob action at the 1853 convention came close to violence. The World's Temperance Convention in New York City in 1853 bogged down for three days in a dispute about whether women would be allowed to speak there. Susan B. Anthony, a leader of the suffrage movement, later said, "No advanced step taken by women has been so bitterly contested as that of speaking in public. For nothing which they have attempted, not even to secure the suffrage, have they been so abused, condemned and antagonized."

Laws that sharply restricted the independent activity of married women also created barriers to the campaign for women's suffrage. According to William Blackstone's Commentaries on the Laws of England, an authoritative commentary on the English common law on which the American legal system is modeled, "By marriage, the husband and wife are one person in law: that is, the very being or legal existence of the woman is suspended during the marriage", referring to the legal doctrine of coverture that was introduced to England by the Normans in the Middle Ages. In 1862, the Chief Justice of the North Carolina Supreme Court denied a divorce to a woman whose husband had horsewhipped her, saying, "The law gives the husband power to use such a degree of force necessary to make the wife behave and know her place." Married women in many states could not legally sign contracts, which made it difficult for them to arrange for convention halls, printed materials, and other things needed by the suffrage movement. Restrictions like these were overcome in part by the passage of married women's property laws in several states, supported in some cases by wealthy fathers who did not want their daughters' inheritance to fall under the complete control of their husbands.

Sentiment in favor of women's rights was strong within the radical wing of the abolitionist movement. William Lloyd Garrison, the leader of the American Anti-Slavery Society, said "I doubt whether a more important movement has been launched touching the destiny of the race, than this in regard to the equality of the sexes". The abolitionist movement, however, attracted only about one per cent of the population at that time, and radical abolitionists were only one part of that movement.

=== Early backing for women's suffrage ===
The New York State Constitutional Convention of 1846 received petitions in support of women's suffrage from residents of at least three counties.

Several members of the radical wing of the abolitionist movement supported suffrage. In 1846, Samuel J. May, a Unitarian minister and radical abolitionist, vigorously supported women's suffrage in a sermon that was later circulated as the first in a series of women's rights tracts. In 1846, the Liberty League, an offshoot of the abolitionist Liberty Party, petitioned Congress to enfranchise women. A convention of the Liberty Party in Rochester, New York in May 1848 approved a resolution calling for "universal suffrage in its broadest sense, including women as well as men." Gerrit Smith, its candidate for president, delivered a speech shortly afterwards at the National Liberty Convention in Buffalo, New York, that elaborated on his party's call for women's suffrage. Lucretia Mott was suggested as the party's vice-presidential candidate – the first time that a woman had been proposed for federal executive office in the U.S. – and she received five votes from delegates at that convention.

=== Early women's rights conventions ===
Women's suffrage was not a major topic within the women's rights movement at that point. Many of its activists were aligned with the Garrisonian wing of the abolitionist movement, which believed that activists should avoid political activity and focus instead on convincing others of their views with "moral suasion". Many were Quakers whose traditions barred both men and women from participation in secular political activity. A series of women's rights conventions did much to alter these attitudes.

==== Seneca Falls convention ====
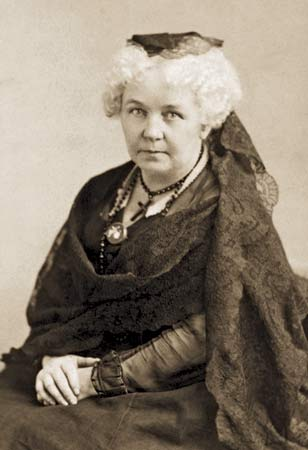
Elizabeth Cady Stanton

The first women's rights convention was the Seneca Falls Convention, a regional event held on July 19 and 20, 1848, in Seneca Falls in the Finger Lakes region of New York. Five women called the convention, four of whom were Quaker social activists, including the well-known Lucretia Mott. The fifth was Elizabeth Cady Stanton, who had discussed the need to organize for women's rights with Mott several years earlier. Stanton, who came from a family that was deeply involved in politics, became a major force in convincing the women's movement that political pressure was crucial to its goals, and that the right to vote was a key weapon. An estimated 300 women and men attended this two-day event, which was widely noted in the press.

The only resolution that was not adopted unanimously by the convention was the one demanding women's right to vote, which was introduced by Stanton. When her husband, a well-known social reformer, learned that she intended to introduce this resolution, he refused to attend the convention and accused her of acting in a way that would turn the proceedings into a farce. Lucretia Mott, the main speaker, was also disturbed by the proposal. The resolution was adopted only after Frederick Douglass, an abolitionist leader and a former slave, gave it his strong support. The convention's Declaration of Sentiments, which was written primarily by Stanton, expressed an intent to build a women's rights movement, and it included a list of grievances, the first two of which protested the lack of women's suffrage. The grievances which were aimed at the United States government "demanded government reform and changes in male roles and behaviors that promoted inequality for women."

This convention was followed two weeks later by the Rochester Women's Rights Convention of 1848, which featured many of the same speakers and likewise voted to support women's suffrage. It was the first women's rights convention to be chaired by a woman, a step that was considered to be radical at the time. That meeting was followed by the Ohio Women's Convention at Salem in 1850, the first women's rights convention to be organized on a statewide basis, which also endorsed women's suffrage.

==== National conventions ====
The first in a series of National Women's Rights Conventions was held in Worcester, Massachusetts on October 23–24, 1850, at the initiative of Lucy Stone and Paulina Wright Davis. National conventions were held afterwards almost every year through 1860, when the Civil War (1861–1865) interrupted the practice. Suffrage was a preeminent goal of these conventions, no longer the controversial issue it had been at Seneca Falls only two years earlier. At the first national convention Stone gave a speech that included a call to petition state legislatures for the right of suffrage.

Reports of this convention reached Britain, prompting Harriet Taylor, soon to be married to philosopher John Stuart Mill, to write an essay called "The Enfranchisement of Women," which was published in the Westminster Review. Heralding the women's movement in the U.S., Taylor's essay helped to initiate a similar movement in Britain. Her essay was reprinted as a women's rights tract in the U.S. and was sold for decades.

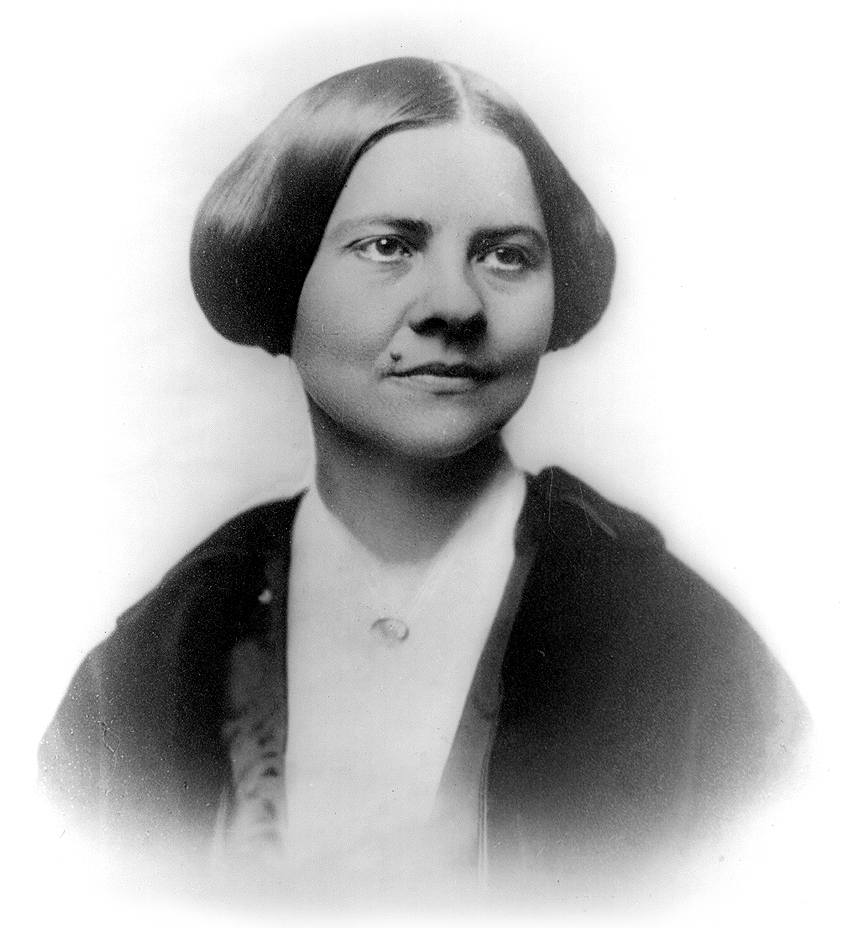
Lucy Stone

Wendell Phillips, a prominent abolitionist and women's rights advocate, delivered a speech at the second national convention in 1851 called "Shall Women Have the Right to Vote?" Describing women's suffrage as the cornerstone of the women's movement, it was later circulated as a women's rights tract.

Several of the women who played leading roles in the national conventions, especially Stone, Anthony and Stanton, were also leaders in establishing women's suffrage organizations after the Civil War. They also included the demand for suffrage as part of their activities during the 1850s. In 1852, Stanton advocated women's suffrage in a speech at the New York State Temperance Convention. In 1853, Stone became the first woman to appeal for women's suffrage before a body of lawmakers when she addressed the Massachusetts Constitutional Convention. In 1854, Anthony organized a petition campaign in New York State that included the demand for suffrage. It culminated in a women's rights convention in the state capitol and a speech by Stanton before the state legislature. In 1857, Stone refused to pay taxes on the grounds that women were taxed without being able to vote on tax laws. The constable sold her household goods at auction until enough money had been raised to pay her tax bill.

The women's rights movement was loosely structured during this period, with few state organizations and no national organization other than a coordinating committee that arranged the annual national conventions. Much of the organizational work for these conventions was performed by Stone, the most visible leader of the movement during this period. At the national convention in 1852, a proposal was made to form a national women's rights organization, but the idea was dropped after fears were voiced that such a move would create cumbersome machinery and lead to internal divisions.

=== Anthony–Stanton collaboration ===
Susan B. Anthony and Elizabeth Cady Stanton met in 1851 and soon became close friends and co-workers. Their decades-long collaboration was pivotal for the suffrage movement and contributed significantly to the broader struggle for women's rights, which Stanton called "the greatest revolution the world has ever known or ever will know." They had complementary skills: Anthony excelled at organizing while Stanton had an aptitude for intellectual matters and writing. Stanton, who was homebound with several children during this period, wrote speeches that Anthony delivered to meetings that she herself organized. Together they developed a sophisticated movement in New York State, but their work at this time dealt with women's issues in general, not specifically suffrage. Anthony, who eventually became the person most closely associated in the public mind with women's suffrage, later said, "I wasn't ready to vote, didn't want to vote, but I did want equal pay for equal work." In the period just before the Civil War, Anthony gave priority to anti-slavery work over her work for the women's movement.

=== Women's Loyal National League ===
Over Anthony's objections, leaders of the movement agreed to suspend women's rights activities during the Civil War in order to focus on the abolition of slavery. In 1863, Anthony and Stanton organized the Women's Loyal National League, the first national women's political organization in the U.S. It collected nearly 400,000 signatures on petitions to abolish slavery in the largest petition drive in the nation's history up to that time.

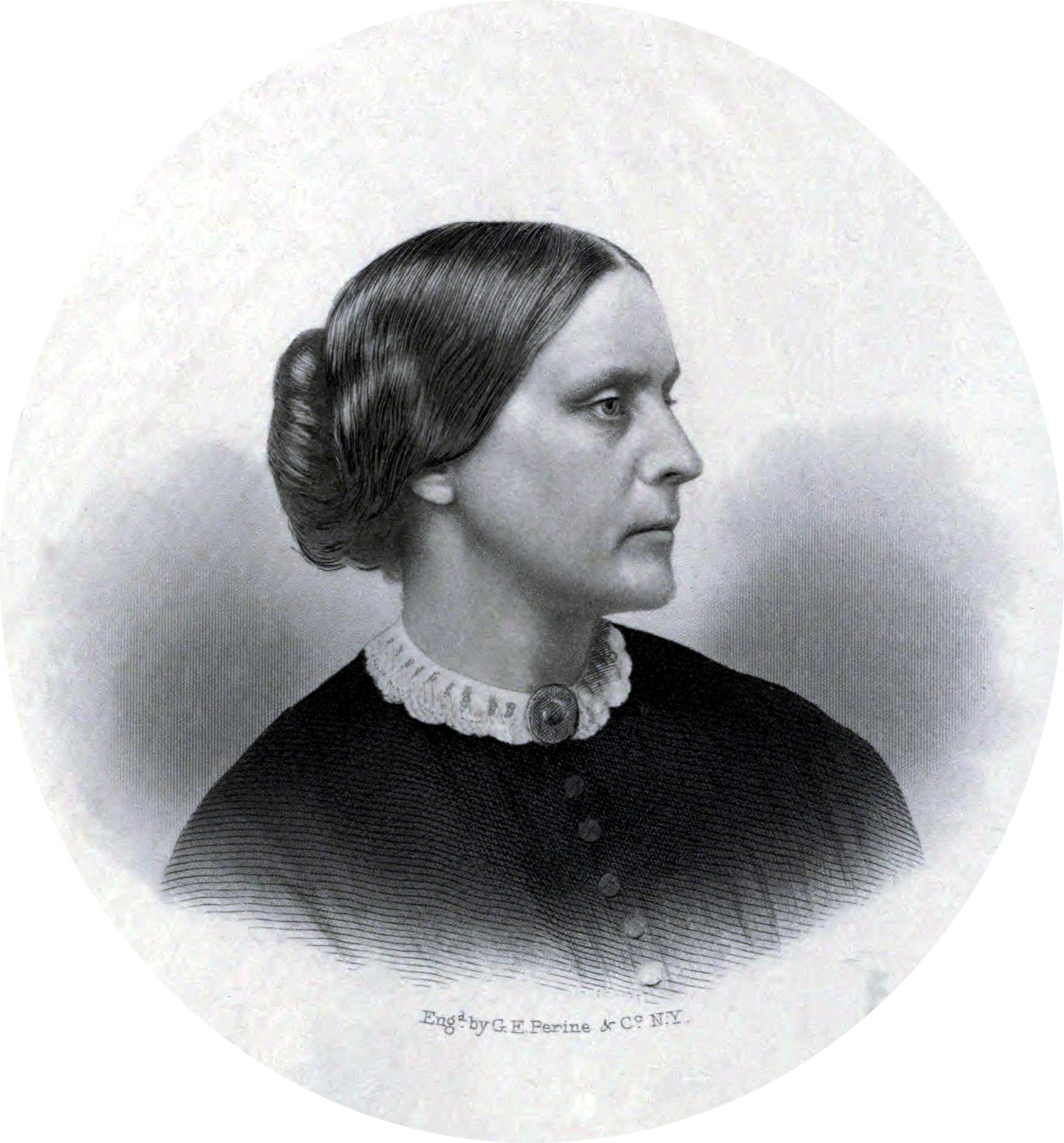
Susan B. Anthony

Although it was not a suffrage organization, the League made it clear that it stood for political equality for women, and it indirectly advanced that cause in several ways. Stanton reminded the public that petitioning was the only political tool available to women at a time when only men were allowed to vote. The League's impressive petition drive demonstrated the value of formal organization to the women's movement, which had traditionally resisted organizational structures, and it marked a continuation of the shift of women's activism from moral suasion to political action. Its 5000 members constituted a widespread network of women activists who gained experience that helped create a pool of talent for future forms of social activism, including suffrage.

=== American Equal Rights Association ===
The Eleventh National Women's Rights Convention, the first since the Civil War, was held in 1866, helping the women's rights movement regain the momentum it had lost during the war. The convention voted to transform itself into the American Equal Rights Association (AERA), whose purpose was to campaign for the equal rights of all citizens, especially the right of suffrage.

In addition to Anthony and Stanton, who organized the convention, the leadership of the new organization included such prominent abolitionist and women's rights activists as Lucretia Mott, Lucy Stone and Frederick Douglass. Its drive for universal suffrage, however, was resisted by some abolitionist leaders and their allies in the Republican Party, who wanted women to postpone their campaign for suffrage until it had first been achieved for male African Americans. Horace Greeley, a prominent newspaper editor, told Anthony and Stanton, "This is a critical period for the Republican Party and the life of our Nation... I conjure you to remember that this is 'the negro's hour,' and your first duty now is to go through the State and plead his claims." They and others, including Lucy Stone, refused to postpone their demands, however, and continued to push for universal suffrage.

In April 1867, Stone and her husband, Henry Blackwell, opened the AERA campaign in Kansas in support of referendums in that state that would enfranchise both African Americans and women. Wendell Phillips, an abolitionist leader who opposed mixing those two causes, surprised and angered AERA workers by blocking the funding that the AERA had expected for their campaign. After an internal struggle, Kansas Republicans decided to support suffrage for black men only and formed an "Anti-Female Suffrage Committee" to oppose the AERA's efforts. By the end of summer, the AERA campaign had almost collapsed, and its finances were exhausted. Anthony and Stanton were harshly criticized by Stone and other AERA members for accepting help during the last days of the campaign from George Francis Train, a wealthy businessman who supported women's rights. Train antagonized many activists by attacking the Republican Party, which had won the loyalty of many reform activists, and openly disparaging the integrity and intelligence of African Americans.

After the Kansas campaign, the AERA increasingly divided into two wings, both advocating universal suffrage but with different approaches. One wing, whose leading figure was Lucy Stone, was willing for black men to achieve suffrage first, if necessary, and wanted to maintain close ties with the Republican Party and the abolitionist movement. The other, whose leading figures were Anthony and Stanton, insisted that women and black men be enfranchised at the same time and worked toward a politically independent women's movement that would no longer be dependent on abolitionists for financial and other resources. The acrimonious annual meeting of the AERA in May 1869 signaled the effective demise of the organization, in the aftermath of which two competing woman suffrage organizations were created.

=== New England Woman Suffrage Association ===
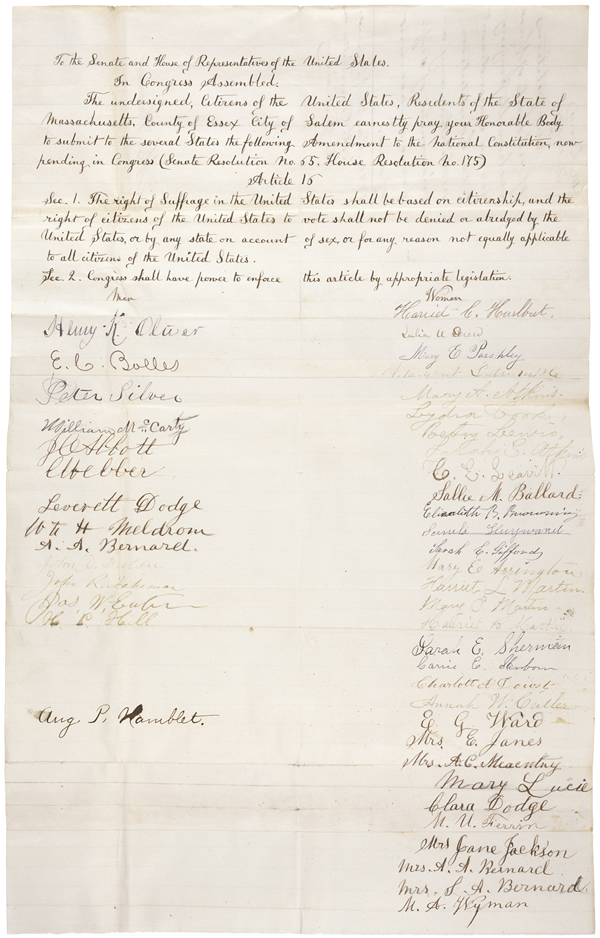
Petition from the citizens of Massachusetts in support of woman suffrage

Partly as a result of the developing split in the women's movement, in 1868 the New England Woman Suffrage Association (NEWSA), the first major political organization in the U.S. with women's suffrage as its goal, was formed. The planners for the NEWSA's founding convention worked to attract Republican support and seated leading Republican politicians, including a U.S. senator, on the speaker's platform. Amid increasing confidence that the Fifteenth Amendment, which would in effect enfranchise black men, was assured of passage, Lucy Stone, a future president of the NEWSA, showed her preference for enfranchising both women and African Americans by unexpectedly introducing a resolution calling for the Republican Party to "drop its watchword of 'Manhood Suffrage'" and to support universal suffrage instead. Despite opposition by Frederick Douglass and others, Stone convinced the meeting to approve the resolution. Two months later, however, when the Fifteenth Amendment was in danger of becoming stalled in Congress, Stone backed away from that position and declared that "Woman must wait for the Negro."

=== The Fifteenth Amendment ===
In May 1869, two days after the final AERA annual meeting, Anthony, Stanton and others formed the National Woman Suffrage Association (NWSA). In November 1869, Lucy Stone, Frances Ellen Watkins Harper, Julia Ward Howe, Henry Blackwell and others, many of whom had helped to create the New England Woman Suffrage Association a year earlier, formed the American Woman Suffrage Association (AWSA). The hostile rivalry between these two organizations created a partisan atmosphere that endured for decades, affecting even professional historians of the women's movement.

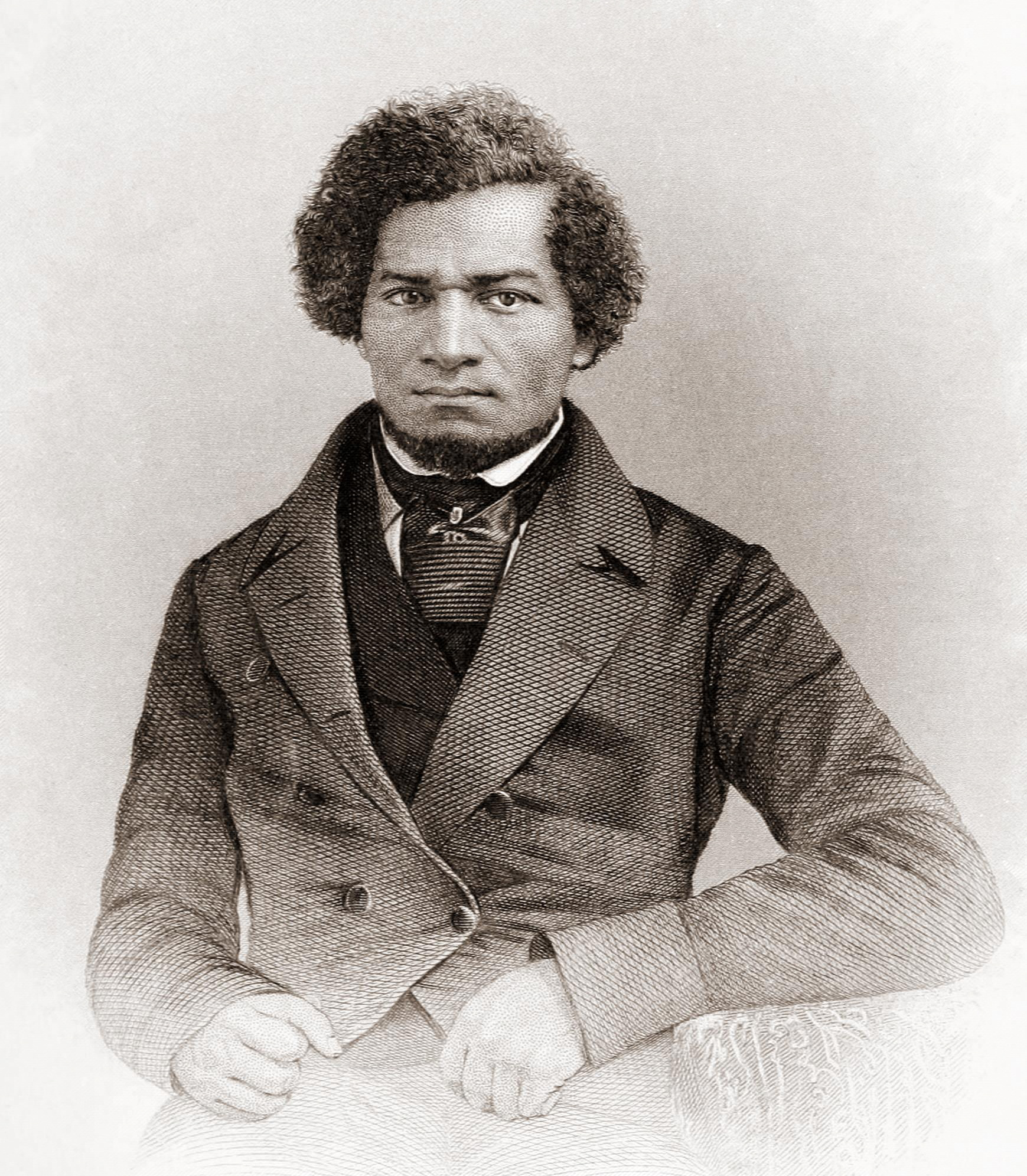
Frederick Douglass

The immediate cause for the split was the proposed Fifteenth Amendment to the U.S. Constitution, a Reconstruction amendment that would prohibit the denial of suffrage because of race. The original language of the amendment included a clause banning voting discrimination on the basis of sex, but was later removed. Stanton and Anthony opposed its passage unless it was accompanied by another amendment that would prohibit the denial of suffrage because of sex. They said that by effectively enfranchising all men while excluding all women, the amendment would create an "aristocracy of sex" by giving constitutional authority to the idea that men were superior to women. Male power and privilege was at the root of society's ills, Stanton argued, and nothing should be done to strengthen it. Anthony and Stanton also warned that black men, who would gain voting power under the amendment, were overwhelmingly opposed to women's suffrage. They were not alone in being unsure of black male support for women's suffrage. Frederick Douglass, a strong supporter of women's suffrage, said, "The race to which I belong have not generally taken the right ground on this question." Douglass, however, strongly supported the amendment, saying it was a matter of life and death for former slaves. Lucy Stone, who became the AWSA's most prominent leader, supported the amendment but said she believed that suffrage for women would be more beneficial to the country than suffrage for black men. The AWSA and most AERA members also supported the amendment.

Both wings of the movement were strongly associated with opposition to slavery, but their leaders sometimes expressed views that reflected the racial attitudes of that era. Stanton, for example, believed that a long process of education would be needed before what she called the "lower orders" of former slaves and immigrant workers would be able to participate meaningfully as voters. In an article in The Revolution, Stanton wrote, "American women of wealth, education, virtue and refinement, if you do not wish the lower orders of Chinese, Africans, Germans and Irish, with their low ideas of womanhood to make laws for you and your daughters ... demand that women too shall be represented in government." In another article, she made a similar statement while personifying those four ethnic groups as "Patrick and Sambo and Hans and Yung Tung". Lucy Stone called a suffrage meeting in New Jersey to consider the question, "Shall women alone be omitted in the reconstruction? Shall [they] ... be ranked politically below the most ignorant and degraded men?" Henry Blackwell, Stone's husband and an AWSA officer, published an open letter to Southern legislatures assuring them that if they allowed both African Americans and women to vote, "the political supremacy of your white race will remain unchanged" and "the black race would gravitate by the law of nature toward the tropics."

The AWSA aimed for close ties with the Republican Party, hoping that the ratification of the Fifteenth Amendment would lead to a Republican push for women's suffrage. The NWSA, while determined to be politically independent, was critical of the Republicans. Anthony and Stanton wrote a letter to the 1868 Democratic National Convention that criticized Republican sponsorship of the Fourteenth Amendment (which granted citizenship to black men but for the first time introduced the word "male" into the Constitution), saying, "While the dominant party has with one hand lifted up two million black men and crowned them with the honor and dignity of citizenship, with the other it has dethroned fifteen million white women – their own mothers and sisters, their own wives and daughters – and cast them under the heel of the lowest orders of manhood." They urged liberal Democrats to convince their party, which did not have a clear direction at that point, to embrace universal suffrage.

The two organizations had other differences as well. Although each campaigned for suffrage at both the state and national levels, the NWSA tended to work more at the national level and the AWSA more at the state level. The NWSA initially worked on a wider range of issues than the AWSA, including divorce reform and equal pay for women. The NWSA was led by women only while the AWSA included both men and women among its leadership.

Events soon removed much of the basis for the split in the movement. In 1870 debate about the Fifteenth Amendment was made irrelevant when that amendment was officially ratified. In 1872, disgust with corruption in government led to a mass defection of abolitionists and other social reformers from the Republicans to the short-lived Liberal Republican Party. The rivalry between the two women's groups was so bitter, however, that a merger proved to be impossible until 1890.

=== New Departure ===
In 1869, Francis and Virginia Minor, husband and wife suffragists from Missouri, outlined a strategy that came to be known as the New Departure, which engaged the suffrage movement for several years. Arguing that the U.S. Constitution implicitly enfranchised women, this strategy relied heavily on Section 1 of the recently adopted Fourteenth Amendment, which reads, "All persons born or naturalized in the United States, and subject to the jurisdiction thereof, are citizens of the United States and of the State wherein they reside. No State shall make or enforce any law which shall abridge the privileges or immunities of citizens of the United States; nor shall any State deprive any person of life, liberty, or property, without due process of law; nor deny to any person within its jurisdiction the equal protection of the laws."

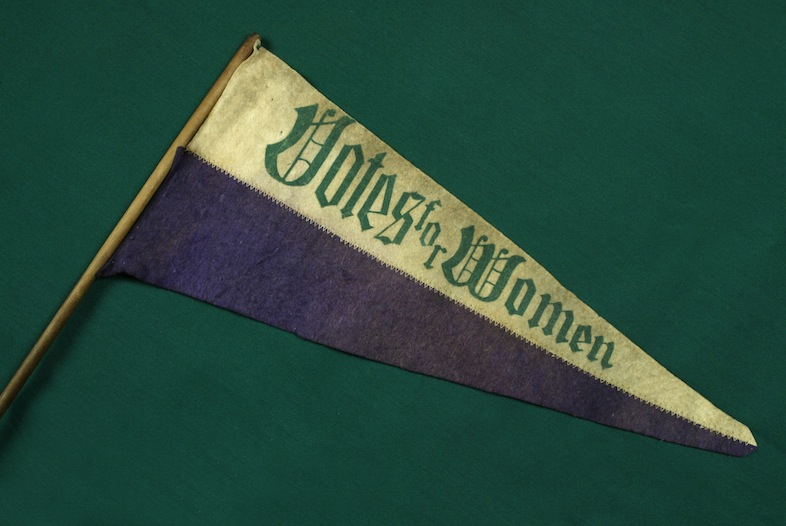
Votes for Women pennant

In 1871, the NWSA officially adopted the New Departure strategy, encouraging women to attempt to vote and to file lawsuits if denied that right. Soon hundreds of women tried to vote in dozens of localities. In some cases, actions like these preceded the New Departure strategy: in 1868 in Vineland, New Jersey, a center for radical spiritualists, nearly 200 women placed their ballots into a separate box and attempted to have them counted, but without success. The AWSA did not officially adopt the New Departure strategy, but Lucy Stone, its leader, attempted to vote in her home town in New Jersey. In one court case resulting from a lawsuit brought by women who had been prevented from voting, the U.S. District Court in Washington, D.C., ruled that women did not have an implicit right to vote, declaring that, "The fact that the practical working of the assumed right would be destructive of civilization is decisive that the right does not exist."

In 1871, Victoria Woodhull, a stockbroker, was invited to speak before a committee of Congress, the first woman to do so. Although she had little previous connection to the women's movement, she presented a modified version of the New Departure strategy. Instead of asking the courts to declare that women had the right to vote, she asked Congress itself to declare that the Constitution implicitly enfranchised women. The committee rejected her suggestion. The NWSA at first reacted enthusiastically to Woodhull's sudden appearance on the scene. Stanton in particular welcomed Woodhull's proposal to assemble a broad-based reform party that would support women's suffrage. Anthony opposed that idea, wanting the NWSA to remain politically independent. The NWSA soon had reason to regret its association with Woodhull. In 1872, she published details of a purported adulterous affair between Rev. Henry Ward Beecher, president of the AWSA, and Elizabeth Tilton, wife of a leading NWSA member. Beecher's subsequent trial was reported in newspapers across the country, resulting in what one scholar has called "political theater" that badly damaged the reputation of the suffrage movement.

The Supreme Court, in 1875, put an end to the New Departure strategy by ruling in Minor v. Happersett that "the Constitution of the United States does not confer the right of suffrage upon anyone". The NWSA decided to pursue the far more difficult strategy of campaigning for a constitutional amendment that would guarantee voting rights for women.

=== United States v. Susan B. Anthony ===
In a case that generated national controversy, Susan B. Anthony was arrested for violating the Enforcement Act of 1870 by casting a vote in the 1872 presidential election. At the trial, the judge directed the jury to deliver a guilty verdict. When he asked Anthony, who had not been permitted to speak during the trial, if she had anything to say, she responded with what one historian has called "the most famous speech in the history of the agitation for woman suffrage". She called "this high-handed outrage upon my citizen's rights", saying, "... you have trampled under foot every vital principle of our government. My natural rights, my civil rights, my political rights, my judicial rights, are all alike ignored." The judge sentenced Anthony to pay a fine of $100, she responded, "I shall never pay a dollar of your unjust penalty", and she never did. However the judge did not order her to be imprisoned until she paid the fine, for Anthony could have appealed her case. On August 18, 2020, U.S. President Donald Trump posthumously pardoned Anthony on the centennial of the ratification of the 19th Amendment.

=== History of Woman Suffrage ===
In 1876, Anthony, Stanton and Matilda Joslyn Gage began working on the History of Woman Suffrage. Originally envisioned as a modest publication that would be produced quickly, the history evolved into a six-volume work of more than 5700 pages written over a period of 41 years. Its last two volumes were published in 1920, long after the deaths of the project's originators, by Ida Husted Harper, who also assisted with the fourth volume. Written by leaders of one wing of the divided women's movement (Lucy Stone, their main rival, refused to have anything to do with the project), the History of Woman Suffrage preserves an enormous amount of material that might have been lost forever, but it does not give a balanced view of events where their rivals are concerned. Because it was for years the main source of documentation about the suffrage movement, historians have had to uncover other sources to provide a more balanced view.

=== Introduction of the women's suffrage amendment ===
In 1878, Senator Aaron A. Sargent, a friend of Susan B. Anthony, introduced into Congress a women's suffrage amendment. More than forty years later it would become the Nineteenth Amendment to the United States Constitution with no changes to its wording. Its text is identical to that of the Fifteenth Amendment except that it prohibits the denial of suffrage because of sex rather than "race, color, or previous condition of servitude". Although a machine politician on most issues, Sargent was a consistent supporter of women's rights who spoke at suffrage conventions and promoted suffrage through the legislative process.

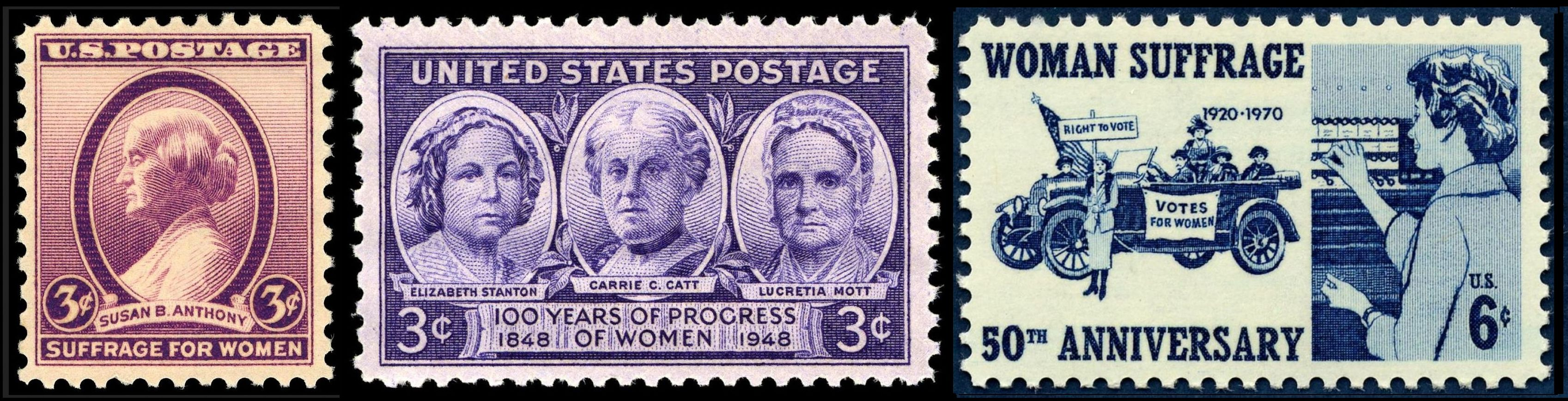
During the 20th century, the U.S. Post Office, under the auspices of the U.S. Government, had issued commemorative postage stamps celebrating notable women who fought for women suffrage and other rights for women. From left to right: — Susan B Anthony, 1936 issue — Elizabeth Stanton, Carrie C. Catt, Lucretia Mott, 1948 issue — Women Suffrage, 1970 issue, celebrating the 50th anniversary of voting rights for women

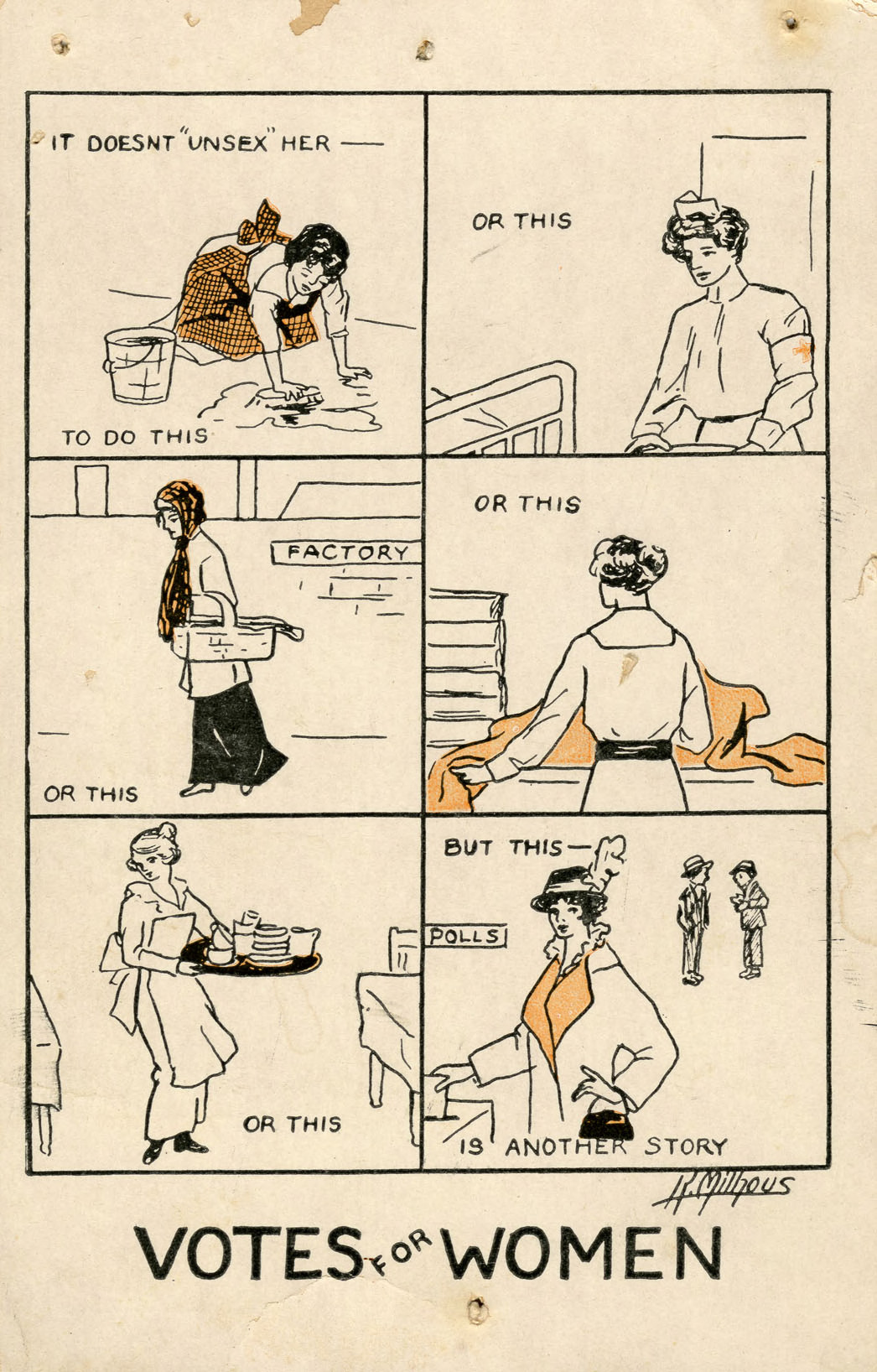
It Doesn't Unsex Her–a women's suffrage postcard from 1915

=== Early female candidates for national office ===
Calling attention to the irony of being legally entitled to run for office while denied the right to vote, Elizabeth Cady Stanton declared herself a candidate for the U.S. Congress in 1866, the first woman to do so. In 1872, Victoria Woodhull formed her own party and declared herself to be its candidate for President of the U.S. even though she was ineligible because she was not yet 35 years old.

In 1884, Belva Ann Lockwood, the first female lawyer to argue a case before the U.S. Supreme Court, became the first woman to conduct a viable campaign for president. She was nominated, without her advance knowledge, by a California group called the Equal Rights Party. Lockwood advocated women's suffrage and other reforms during a coast-to-coast campaign that received respectful coverage from at least some major periodicals. She financed her campaign partly by charging admission to her speeches. Neither the AWSA nor the NWSA, both of whom had already endorsed the Republican candidate for president, supported Lockwood's candidacy.

Apart from runs for national office, many women were elected or appointed to hold certain offices across the country prior to the passage of the Nineteenth Amendment. Many states constitutions contained language that was gender neutral as to the issue of officeholding. Women took advantage of this by running for office as a way to make headway in gaining the right to vote. Much of women's fight to gain officeholding rights and voting rights took place separately and were understood to be completely different rights by much of the population.

=== Initial successes and failures ===
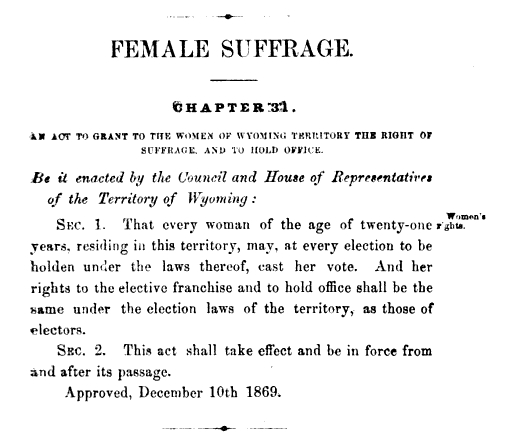
An act of the Territory of Wyoming enfranchised women on December 10, 1869, which is commemorated as Wyoming Day in the state.

Women were enfranchised in frontier Wyoming Territory in 1869 and in Utah in 1870. Because Utah held two elections before Wyoming, Utah became the first place in the nation where women legally cast ballots after the launch of the suffrage movement. In 1887, Kansas women could vote in city elections and hold certain offices. The short-lived Populist Party endorsed women's suffrage, contributing to the enfranchisement of women in Colorado in 1893 and Idaho in 1896. In some localities, women gained various forms of partial suffrage, such as voting for school boards. According to a 2018 study in The Journal of Politics, states with large suffrage movements and competitive political environments were more likely to extend voting rights to women; this is one reason why Western states were quicker to adopt women's suffrage than states in the East.

In the late 1870s, the suffrage movement received a major boost when the Women's Christian Temperance Union (WCTU), the largest women's organization in the country, decided to campaign for suffrage and created a Franchise Department to support that effort. Frances Willard, its pro-suffrage leader, urged WCTU members to pursue the right to vote as a means of protecting their families from alcohol and other vices. In 1886 the WCTU submitted to Congress petitions with 200,000 signatures in support of a national suffrage amendment. In 1885, the Grange, a large farmers' organization, officially endorsed women's suffrage. In 1890, the American Federation of Labor, a large labor alliance, endorsed women's suffrage and subsequently collected 270,000 names on petitions supporting that goal.

A proposed 16th amendment, giving the vote to women, was introduced in 1869 and defeated by the Senate in 1887. Between 1870 and 1890, women's suffrage amendments were defeated by referendum in eight states.

== 1890–1919 ==
=== Merger of rival suffrage organizations ===
The AWSA, which was especially strong in New England, was initially the larger of the two rival suffrage organizations, but it declined in strength during the 1880s. Stanton and Anthony, the leading figures in the competing NWSA, were more widely known as leaders of the women's suffrage movement during this period and were more influential in setting its direction. They sometimes used daring tactics. Anthony, for example, interrupted the official ceremonies of the 100th anniversary of the U.S. Declaration of Independence to present the NWSA's Declaration of Rights for Women. The AWSA declined any involvement in the action.

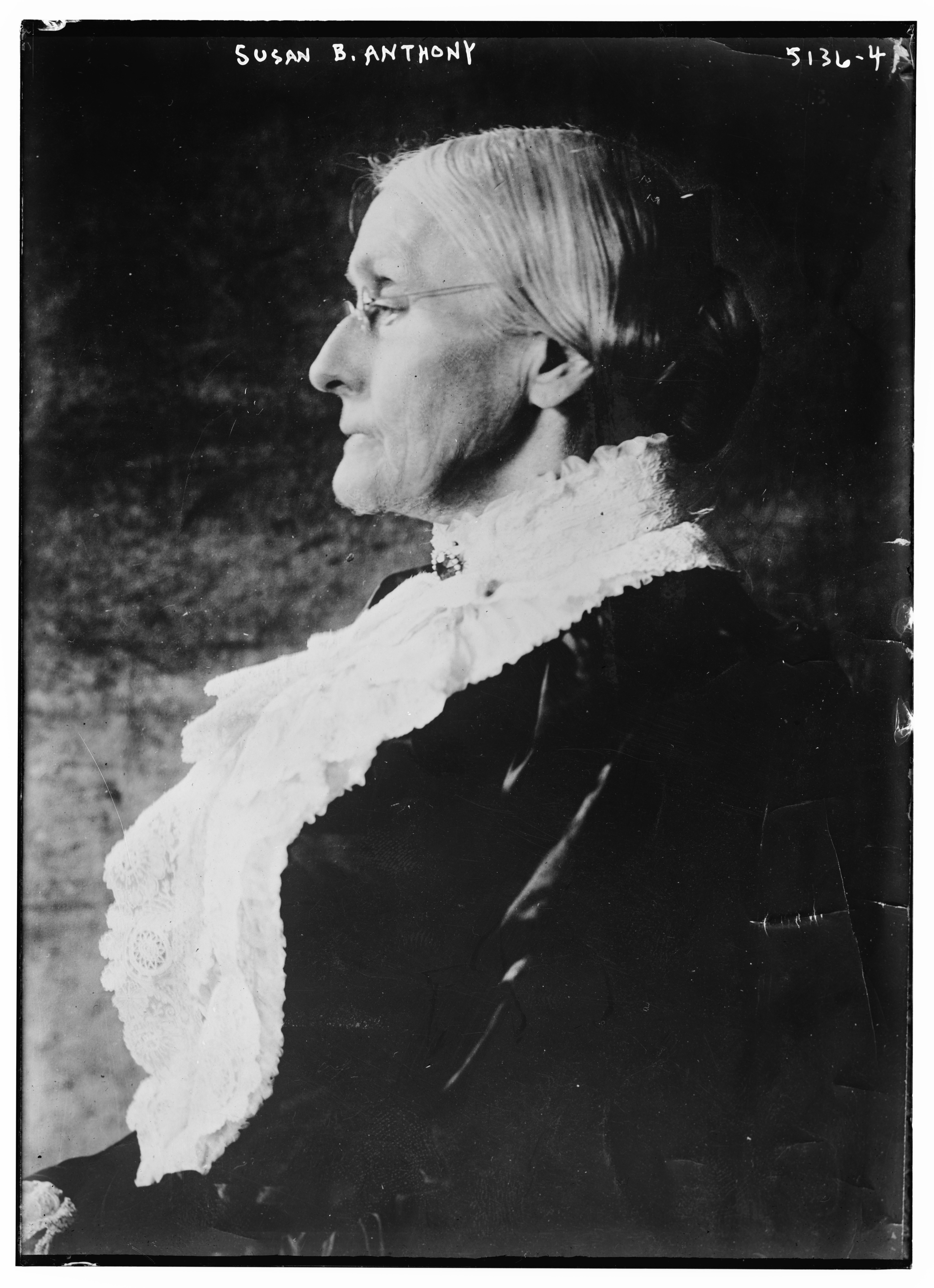
Susan B. Anthony in 1900

Over time, the NWSA moved into closer alignment with the AWSA, placing less emphasis on confrontational actions and more on respectability, and no longer promoting a wide range of reforms. The NWSA's hopes for a federal suffrage amendment were frustrated when the Senate voted against it in 1887, after which the NWSA put more energy into campaigning at the state level, as the AWSA was already doing. Work at the state level, however, also had its frustrations. Between 1870 and 1910, the suffrage movement conducted 480 campaigns in 33 states just to have the issue of women's suffrage brought before the voters, and those campaigns resulted in only 17 instances of the issue actually being placed on the ballot. These efforts led to women's suffrage in two states, Colorado and Idaho.

Alice Stone Blackwell, daughter of AWSA leaders Lucy Stone and Henry Blackwell, was a major influence in bringing the rival suffrage leaders together, proposing a joint meeting in 1887 to discuss a merger. Anthony and Stone favored the idea, but opposition from several NWSA veterans delayed the move. In 1890, the two organizations merged as the National American Woman Suffrage Association (NAWSA). Stanton was president of the new organization, and Stone was chair of its executive committee, but Anthony, who had the title of vice president, was its leader in practice, becoming president herself in 1892 when Stanton retired.

=== National American Woman Suffrage Association ===
Although Anthony was the leading force in the newly merged organization, it did not always follow her lead. In 1893, the NAWSA voted over Anthony's objection to alternate the site of its annual conventions between Washington and various other parts of the country. Anthony's pre-merger NWSA had always held its conventions in Washington to help maintain focus on a national suffrage amendment. Arguing against this decision, she said she feared, accurately as it turned out, that the NAWSA would engage in suffrage work at the state level at the expense of national work.

Stanton, elderly but still very much a radical, did not fit comfortably into the new organization, which was becoming more conservative. In 1895 she published The Woman's Bible, a controversial best-seller that attacked the use of the Bible to relegate women to an inferior status. The NAWSA voted to disavow any connection with the book despite Anthony's objection that such a move was unnecessary and hurtful. Stanton afterwards grew increasingly alienated from the suffrage movement.

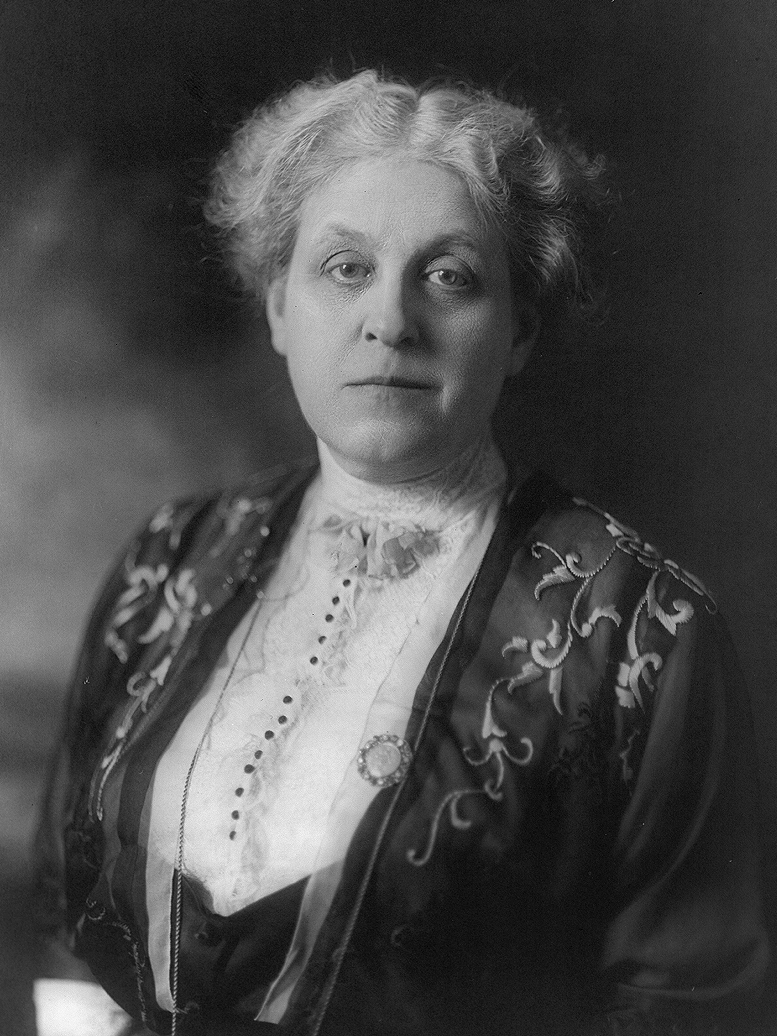
Carrie Chapman Catt

The suffrage movement declined in vigor during the years immediately after the 1890 merger. When Carrie Chapman Catt became head of the NAWSA's Organization Committee in 1895, the number of local chapters and the identities of their officers were largely unknown. Moreover, ten states had no known suffrage organization. Catt began revitalizing the organization, establishing a plan of work with clear goals for every state every year. Anthony was impressed and arranged for Catt to succeed her when she retired from the presidency of the NAWSA in 1900. In her new post, Catt continued to transform the unwieldy organization into one that would be better prepared to lead a major suffrage campaign.

Catt noted the rapidly growing women's club movement, which was taking up some of the slack left by the decline of the temperance movement. Local women's clubs at first were mostly reading groups focused on literature, but they increasingly evolved into civic improvement organizations of middle-class women meeting in each other's homes weekly. Their national organization was the General Federation of Women's Clubs (GFWC), founded in 1890. The clubs avoided controversial issues that would divide the membership, especially religion and prohibition. In the South and East, suffrage was also highly divisive, while there was little resistance to it among clubwomen in the West. In the Midwest, club women had first avoided the suffrage issue out of caution, but after 1900 increasingly came to support it. Catt implemented what was known as the "society plan," a successful effort to recruit wealthy members of the women's club movement whose time, money and experience could help build the suffrage movement. By 1914, women's suffrage was endorsed by the national General Federation of Women's Clubs.

Catt resigned her position after four years, partly because of her husband's declining health and partly to help organize the International Woman Suffrage Alliance, which was created in Germany, Berlin in 1904 with Catt as president. In 1904, Anna Howard Shaw was elected president of the NAWSA. Shaw was an energetic worker and a talented orator but not an effective administrator. Between 1910 and 1916, the NAWSA's national board experienced a constant turmoil that endangered the existence of the organization.

Although its membership and finances were at all-time highs, the NAWSA decided to replace Shaw by bringing Catt back once again as president in 1915. Authorized by the NAWSA to name her own executive board, which previously had been elected by the organization's annual convention, Catt quickly converted the loosely structured organization into one that was highly centralized.

=== MacKenzie v. Hare ===
Section 3 of the Expatriation Act of 1907 provided for loss of citizenship by American women who married aliens. The U.S. Supreme Court first considered the Expatriation Act of 1907 in the 1915 case MacKenzie v. Hare. The plaintiff, a suffragist named Ethel MacKenzie, was living in California, which since 1911 had extended the franchise to women. However, she had been denied voter registration by the respondent in his capacity as a Commissioner of the San Francisco Board of Election on the grounds of her marriage to a Scottish man. MacKenzie contended that the Expatriation Act of 1907 "if intended to apply to her, is beyond the authority of Congress", as neither the 14th Amendment nor any other part of the Constitution gave Congress the power to "denationalize a citizen without his concurrence". However, Justice Joseph McKenna, writing the majority opinion, stated that while "[i]t may be conceded that a change of citizenship cannot be arbitrarily imposed, that is, imposed without the concurrence of the citizen", but "[t]he law in controversy does not have that feature. It deals with a condition voluntarily entered into, with notice of the consequences." Justice James Clark McReynolds, in a concurring opinion, stated that the case should be dismissed for lack of jurisdiction.

=== Opposition to women's suffrage ===
On November 5, 1895, Massachusetts held a referendum on allowing women to vote in municipal elections. The referendum failed 36.76% to 63.24%. Women were allowed to vote on the measure, however, only 4% of them did so.

Brewers and distillers were particularly opposed to women's suffrage, fearing that women voters would favor the prohibition of alcoholic beverages. During the 1896 election, woman suffrage and prohibition stood together, and this was brought to the attention of those who opposed both woman suffrage and prohibition. In order to disrupt the campaign's success, a day before the election, the Liquor Dealers' League gathered some businessmen to help undermine the effort. Rumors said that these businessmen were going to make sure all the "bad women" in Oakland, California acted rowdy in order to hurt their reputation and in turn, this would lessen the women's chances of getting the woman's suffrage amendment passed. German Lutherans and German Catholics typically opposed prohibition and woman suffrage; they favored paternalistic families with the husband deciding the family position on public affairs. Their opposition to women's suffrage was subsequently used as an argument in favor of suffrage when German Americans became pariahs during World War I.

Defeat could lead to allegations of fraud. After the defeat of the referendum for women's suffrage in Michigan in 1912, the governor accused the brewers of complicity in widespread electoral fraud that resulted in its defeat. Evidence of vote stealing was also strong during referendums in Nebraska and Iowa.

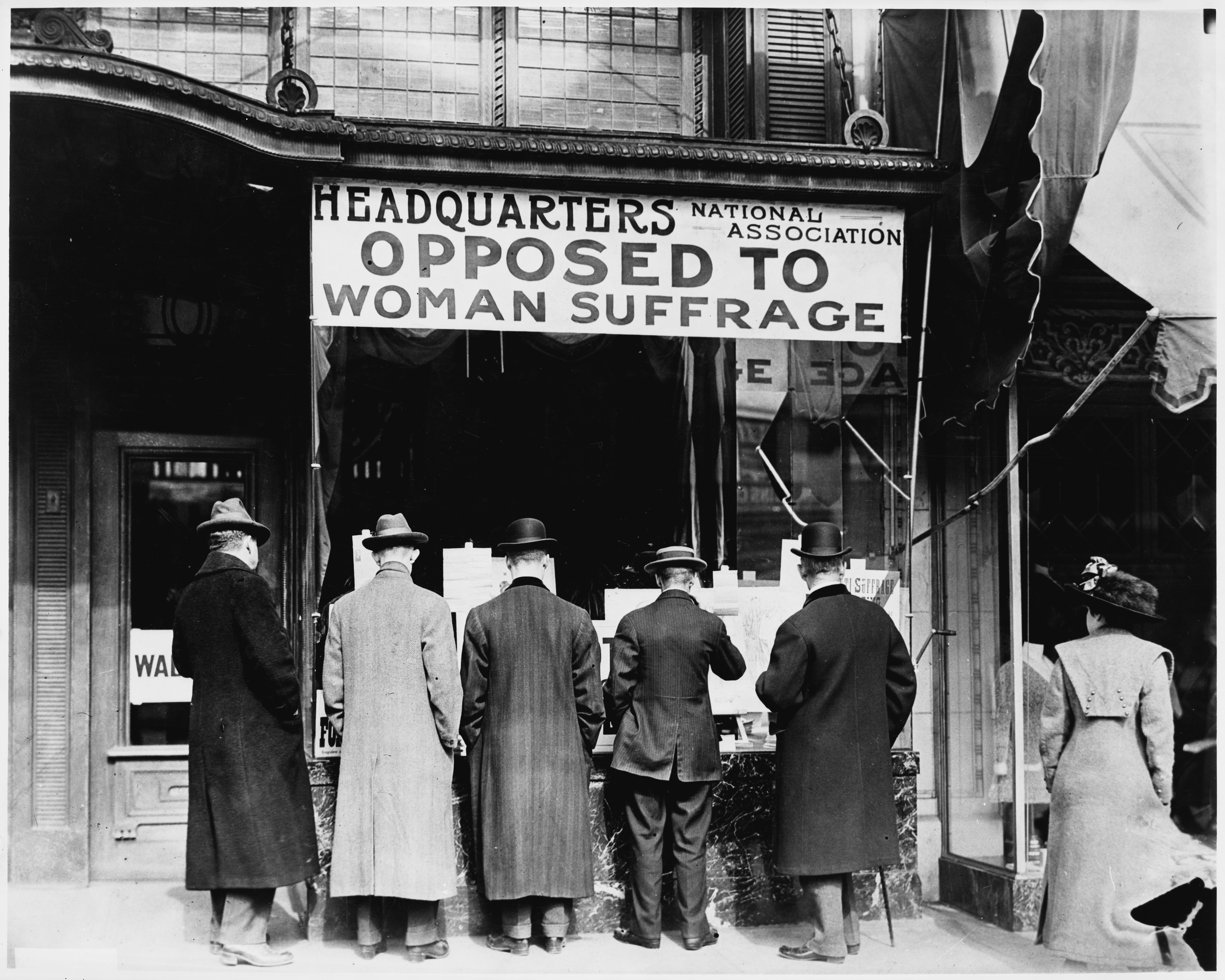
Headquarters of the National Association Opposed to Woman Suffrage.

Some other businesses, such as Southern cotton mills, opposed suffrage because they feared that women voters would support the drive to eliminate child labor. Political machines, such as Tammany Hall in New York City, opposed it because they feared that the addition of female voters would dilute the control they had established over groups of male voters. By the time of the New York State referendum on women's suffrage in 1917, however, some wives and daughters of Tammany Hall leaders were working for suffrage, leading it to take a neutral position that was crucial to the referendum's passage. Although the Catholic Church did not take an official position on suffrage, very few of its leaders supported it, and some of its leaders, such as Cardinal Gibbons, made their opposition clear.

The New York Times after first supporting suffrage reversed itself and issued stern warnings. A 1912 editorial predicted that with suffrage women would make impossible demands, such as, "serving as soldiers and sailors, police patrolmen or firemen...and would serve on juries and elect themselves to executive offices and judgeships." It blamed a lack of masculinity for the failure of men to fight back, warning women would get the vote "if the men are not firm and wise enough and, it may as well be said, masculine enough to prevent them.".

==== Women against suffrage ====
Anti-suffrage forces, initially called the "remonstrants", organized as early as 1870 when the Woman's Anti-Suffrage Association of Washington was formed. Widely known as the "antis", they eventually created organizations in some twenty states. In 1911, the National Association Opposed to Women's Suffrage was created. It claimed 350,000 members and opposed women's suffrage, feminism, and socialism. It argued that woman suffrage "would reduce the special protections and routes of influence available to women, destroy the family, and increase the number of socialist-leaning voters."

Middle and upper class anti-suffrage women were conservatives with several motivations. Society women in particular had personal access to powerful politicians, and were reluctant to surrender that advantage. Most often the antis believed that politics was dirty and that women's involvement would surrender the moral high ground that women had claimed, and that partisanship would disrupt local club work for civic betterment, as represented by the General Federation of Women's Clubs. The best organized movement was the New York State Association Opposed to Woman Suffrage (NYSAOWS). Its credo, as set down by its president Josephine Jewell Dodge, was:

We believe in every possible advancement to women. We believe that this advancement should be along those legitimate lines of work and endeavor for which she is best fitted and for which she has now unlimited opportunities. We believe this advancement will be better achieved through strictly non-partisan effort and without the limitations of the ballot. We believe in Progress, not in Politics for women.

The New York State Association Opposed to Woman Suffrage (NYSAOWS) used grass roots mobilization techniques they had learned from watching the suffragists to defeat the 1915 referendum. They were very similar to the suffragists themselves, but used a counter-crusading style warning of the evils that suffrage would bring to women. They rejected leadership by men and stressed the importance of independent women in philanthropy and social betterment. NYSAOWS was narrowly defeated in New York in 1916 and the state voted to give women the vote. The organization moved to Washington to oppose the federal constitutional amendment for suffrage, becoming the "National Association Opposed to Woman Suffrage" (NAOWS), where it was taken over by men, and assumed a much harsher rhetorical tone, especially in attacking "red radicalism". After 1919, the antis adjusted smoothly to enfranchisement and became active in party affairs, especially in the Republican Party.

=== Southern strategy ===
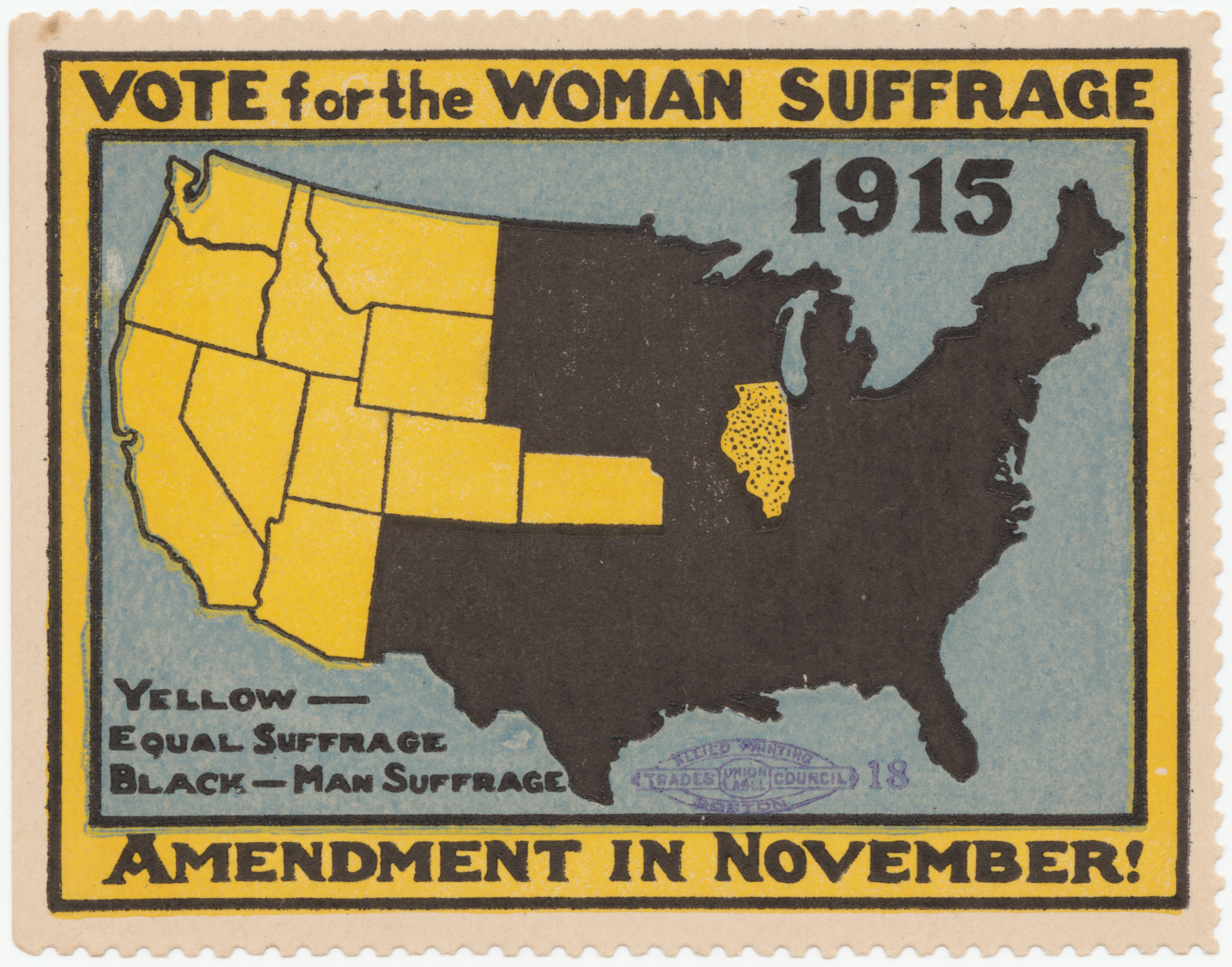
Vote for the Woman Suffrage Amendment, 1915

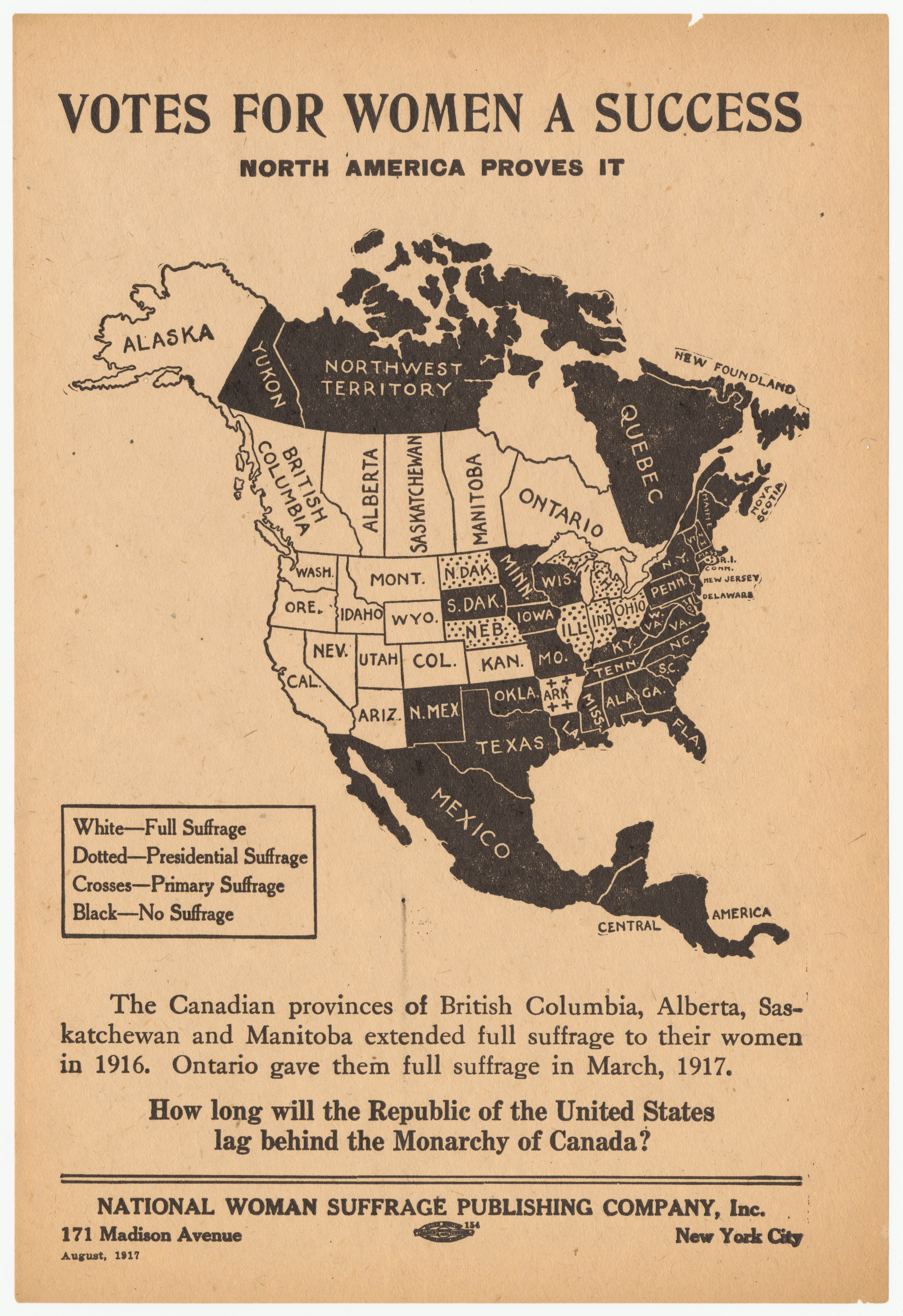
A promotional map of the woman's suffrage movement in the U.S. and Canada by 1917. The U.S. states and Canadian provinces that had adopted suffrage are colored white (or dotted and crosses, in case of partial suffrage) and the others black.

The Constitution required 34 states (three-fourths of the 45 states in 1900) to ratify an amendment, and unless the rest of the country was unanimous there had to be support from at least some of the 11 ex-Confederate states for the Amendment to succeed. The South was the most conservative region and always gave the least support for suffrage. There was little or no suffrage activity in the region until the late nineteenth century. Aileen S. Kraditor identifies four distinctly Southern characteristics that contributed to the South's reticence. First, Southern white men held to traditional values regarding women's public roles. Second, the Solid South was tightly controlled by the Democratic Party, so playing the two parties against each other was not a feasible strategy. Third, strong support for states' rights meant there was automatic opposition to a federal constitutional amendment. Fourth, Jim Crow attitudes meant that expansion of the vote to women, which would have included black women, was strongly opposed. Three more Western territories became states by 1912, helping the pro-Amendment numbers, that now required 36 states out of 48. In the end, Tennessee was the critical 36th state to ratify on August 18, 1920.

Mildred Rutherford, president of the Georgia United Daughters of the Confederacy and leader of the National Association Opposed to Woman Suffrage, made clear the opposition of elite white women to suffrage in a 1914 speech to the Georgia state legislature:

The women who are working for this measure are striking at the principle for which their fathers fought during the Civil War. Woman's suffrage comes from the North and the West and from women who do not believe in state's rights and who wish to see negro women using the ballot. I do not believe the state of Georgia has sunk so low that her good men can not legislate for women. If this time ever comes then it will be time for women to claim the ballot.

Elna Green points out that, "Suffrage rhetoric claimed that enfranchised women would outlaw child labor, pass minimum-wage and maximum-hours laws for women workers, and establish health and safety standards for factory workers." The threat of these reforms united planters, textile mill owners, railroad magnates, city machine bosses, and the liquor interest in a formidable combine against suffrage.

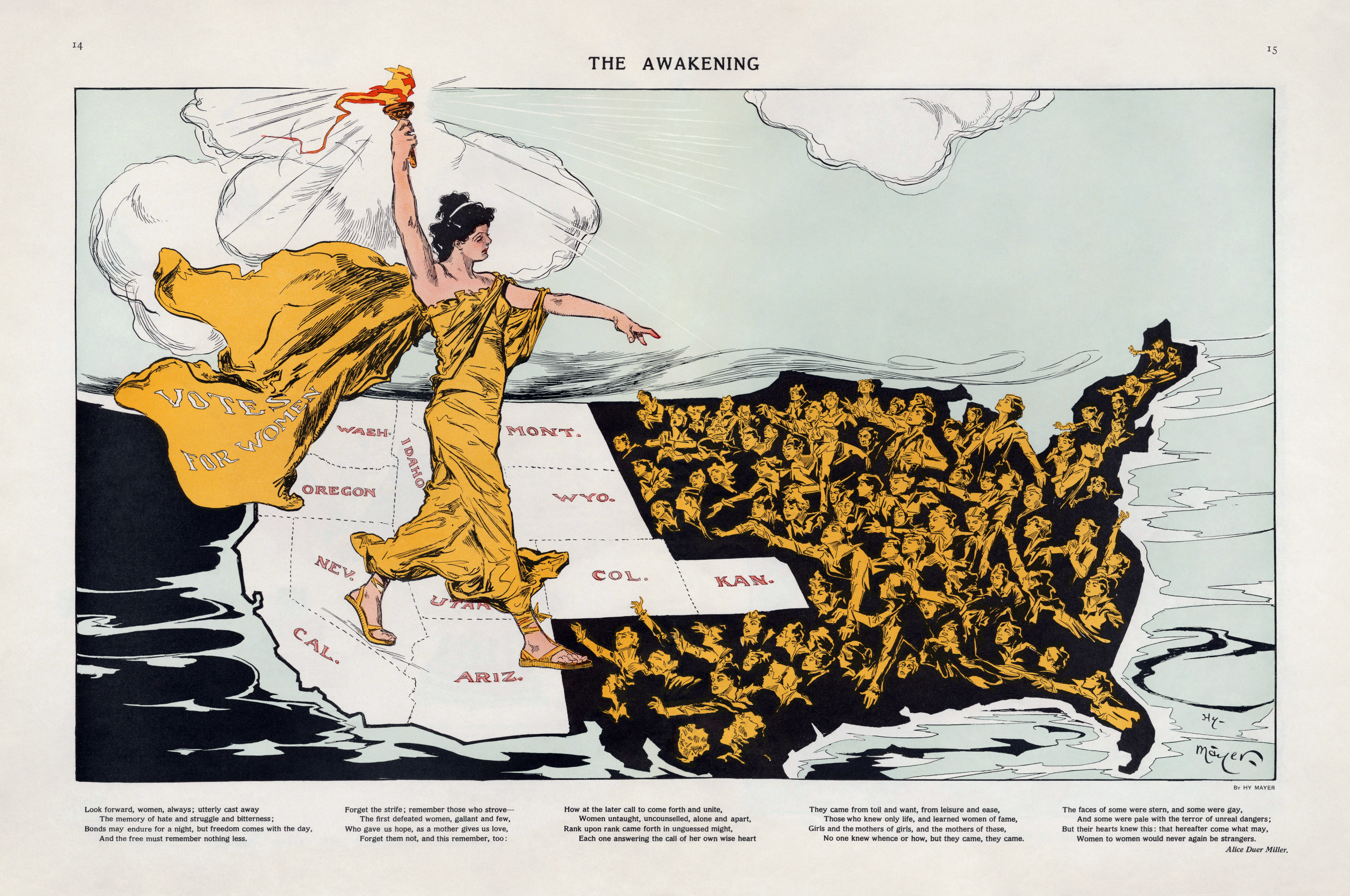
"The Awakening": "Votes for Women" in 1915 Puck Magazine

Henry Browne Blackwell, an officer of the AWSA before the merger and a prominent figure in the movement afterwards, urged the suffrage movement to follow a strategy of convincing southern political leaders that they could ensure white supremacy in their region without violating the Fifteenth Amendment by enfranchising educated women, who would predominantly be white. Shortly after Blackwell presented his proposal to the Mississippi delegation to the U.S. Congress, his plan was given serious consideration by the Mississippi Constitutional Convention of 1890, whose main purpose was to find legal ways of further curtailing the political power of African Americans. Although the convention adopted other measures instead, the fact that Blackwell's ideas were taken seriously drew the interest of many suffragists.

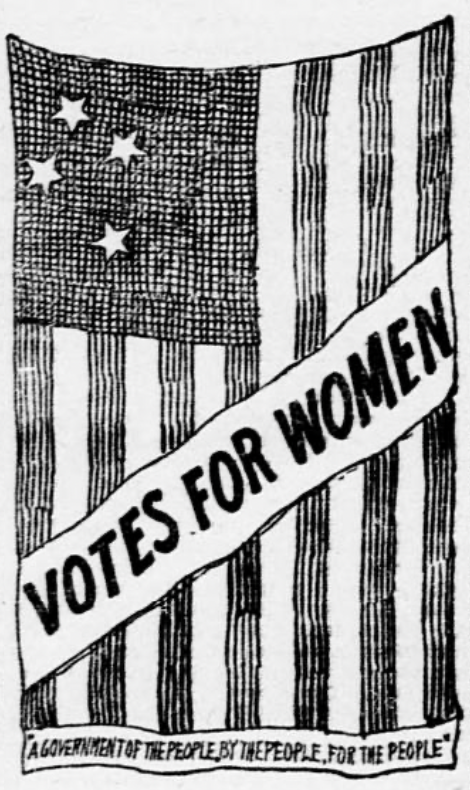
Suffragette's flag, 1909

Blackwell's ally in this effort was Laura Clay, who convinced the NAWSA to launch a state-by-state campaign in the South based on Blackwell's strategy. Clay was one of several Southern NAWSA members who opposed the idea of a national women's suffrage amendment on the grounds that it would impinge on states' rights. (A generation later Clay campaigned against the pending national amendment during the final battle for its ratification.) Amid predictions by some proponents of this strategy that the South would lead the way in the enfranchisement of women, suffrage organizations were established throughout the region. Anthony, Catt and Blackwell campaigned for suffrage in the South in 1895, with the latter two calling for suffrage only for educated women. With Anthony's reluctant cooperation, the NAWSA maneuvered to accommodate the politics of white supremacy in that region. Anthony asked her old friend Frederick Douglass, a former slave, not to attend the NAWSA convention in Atlanta in 1895, the first to be held in a Southern city. Black NAWSA members were excluded from 1903 convention in the Southern city of New Orleans, which marked the peak of this strategy's influence.

The leaders of the Southern movement were privileged upper-class belles with a strong position in high society and in church affairs. They tried to use their upscale connections to convince powerful men that suffrage was a good idea to purify society. They also argued that giving white women the vote would more than counterbalance giving the vote to the smaller number of black women. No Southern state enfranchised women as a result of this strategy, however, and most Southern suffrage societies that were established during this period lapsed into inactivity. The NAWSA leadership afterwards said it would not adopt policies that "advocated the exclusion of any race or class from the right of suffrage." Nonetheless, NAWSA reflected its white membership's viewpoint by minimizing the role of black suffragists.

=== Anti-black racism ===
The woman's suffrage movement, led in the nineteenth century by stalwart women such as Susan B. Anthony and Elizabeth Cady Stanton, had its genesis in the abolitionist movement, but by the dawn of the twentieth century, Anthony's goal of universal suffrage was eclipsed by a near-universal racism in the United States. While earlier suffragists had believed the two issues could be linked, the passage of the Fourteenth Amendment and Fifteenth Amendment forced a division between African-American rights and suffrage for women by prioritizing voting rights for black men over universal suffrage for all men and women. In 1903, the NAWSA officially adopted a platform of states' rights that was intended to mollify and bring Southern U.S. suffrage groups into the fold. The statement's signers included Anthony, Carrie Chapman Catt, and Anna Howard Shaw.

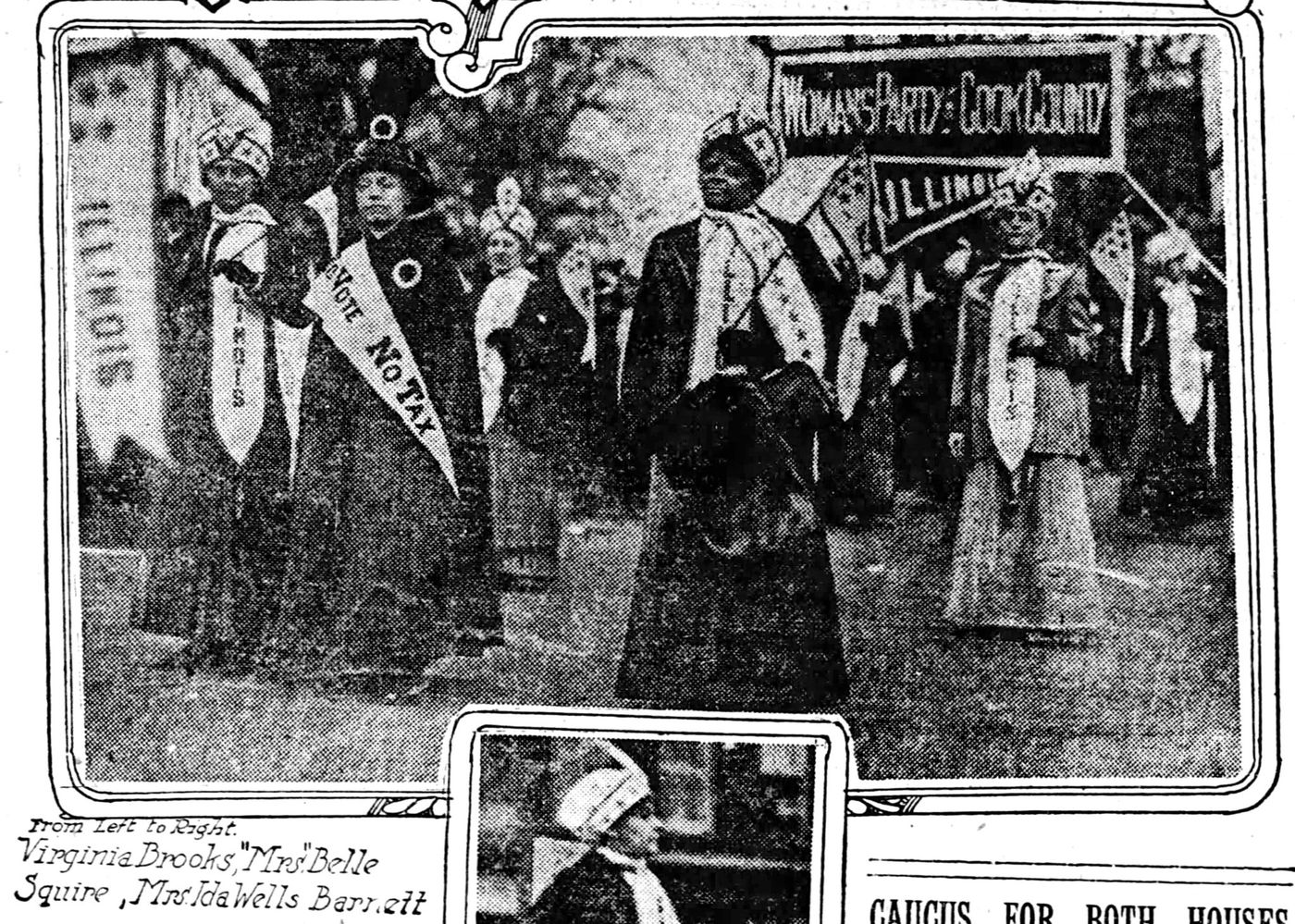
Ida B. Wells-Barnett marched with her state delegation despite being told to march with other black people in another section.

With the prevalence of "racial" segregation throughout the country, and within organizations such as the NAWSA, black people had formed their own activist groups to fight for their equal rights. Many were college educated and resented their exclusion from political power. The fiftieth anniversary of the Emancipation Proclamation issued by President Abraham Lincoln in 1863 also fell in 1913, giving them even further incentive to march in the suffrage parade. Nellie Quander of Alpha Kappa Alpha – the nation's oldest black sorority – asked for a place in the college women's section for the women of Howard University. While there were two letters discussing the matter, the letter on February 17, 1913, discusses the desire for the women of Howard to be given a desirable place in the march as well as mentioning correspondence and requests from an AKA sorority member, leader of the suffrage parade, vice president of the NAWSA, and appointer of both Paul & Burns as the organizer of the parade, Jane Addams. These letters were follow-up discussions to the one begun by Paul and initiated by Elise Hill when Hill went down to Howard University at the request of Paul to recruit the Howard women. The Howard University group included "Artist, one – Mrs. May Howard Jackson; college women, six – Mrs. Mary Church Terrell, Mrs. Daniel Murray, Miss Georgia Simpson, Miss Charlotte Steward, Miss Harriet Shadd, Miss Bertha McNiel; teacher, one – Miss Caddie Park; musician, one – Mrs. Harriett G. Marshall; professional women, two – Dr. Amanda V. Gray, Dr. Eva Ross; Illinois delegation – Mrs. Ida Wells Barnett; Michigan – Mrs. McCoy, of Detroit, who carried the banner; Howard University, group of twenty-five girls in caps and gowns; home makers – Mrs. Duffield, who carried New York banner, Mrs. M. D. Butler, Mrs. Carrie W. Clifford." One trained nurse, whose name could not be ascertained, marched, and an old mammy was brought down by the Delaware delegation.

But the Virginia-born Gardener tried to persuade Paul that including black people would be a bad idea because the Southern delegations were threatening to pull out of the march. Paul had attempted to keep news about black marchers out of the press, but when the Howard group announced they intended to participate, the public became aware of the conflict. A newspaper account indicated that Paul told some black suffragists that the NAWSA believed in equal rights for "colored women", but that some Southern women were likely to object to their presence. A source in the organization insisted that the official stance was to "permit negroes to march if they cared to". In a 1974 oral history interview, Paul recalled the "hurdle" of Terrell's plan to march, which upset the Southern delegations. She said the situation was resolved when a Quaker leading the men's section proposed the men march between the Southern groups and the Howard University group.

While in Paul's memory, a compromise was reached to order the parade with Southern women, then the men's section, and finally the Negro women's section, reports in the NAACP paper, The Crisis, depict events unfolding quite differently, with black women protesting the plan to segregate them. What is clear is that some groups attempted, on the day of the parade, to segregate their delegations. For example, a last-minute instruction by the chair of the state delegation section, Genevieve Stone, caused additional uproar when she asked the Illinois delegation's sole black member, Ida B. Wells-Barnett, to march with the segregated black group at the back of the parade. Some historians claim Paul made the request, though this seems unlikely after the official NAWSA decision. Wells-Barnett eventually rejoined the Illinois delegation as the procession moved down the avenue. In the end, black women marched in several state delegations, including New York and Michigan. Some joined in with their co-workers in the professional groups. There were also black men driving many of the floats. The spectators did not treat the black participants any differently.

=== New Woman ===
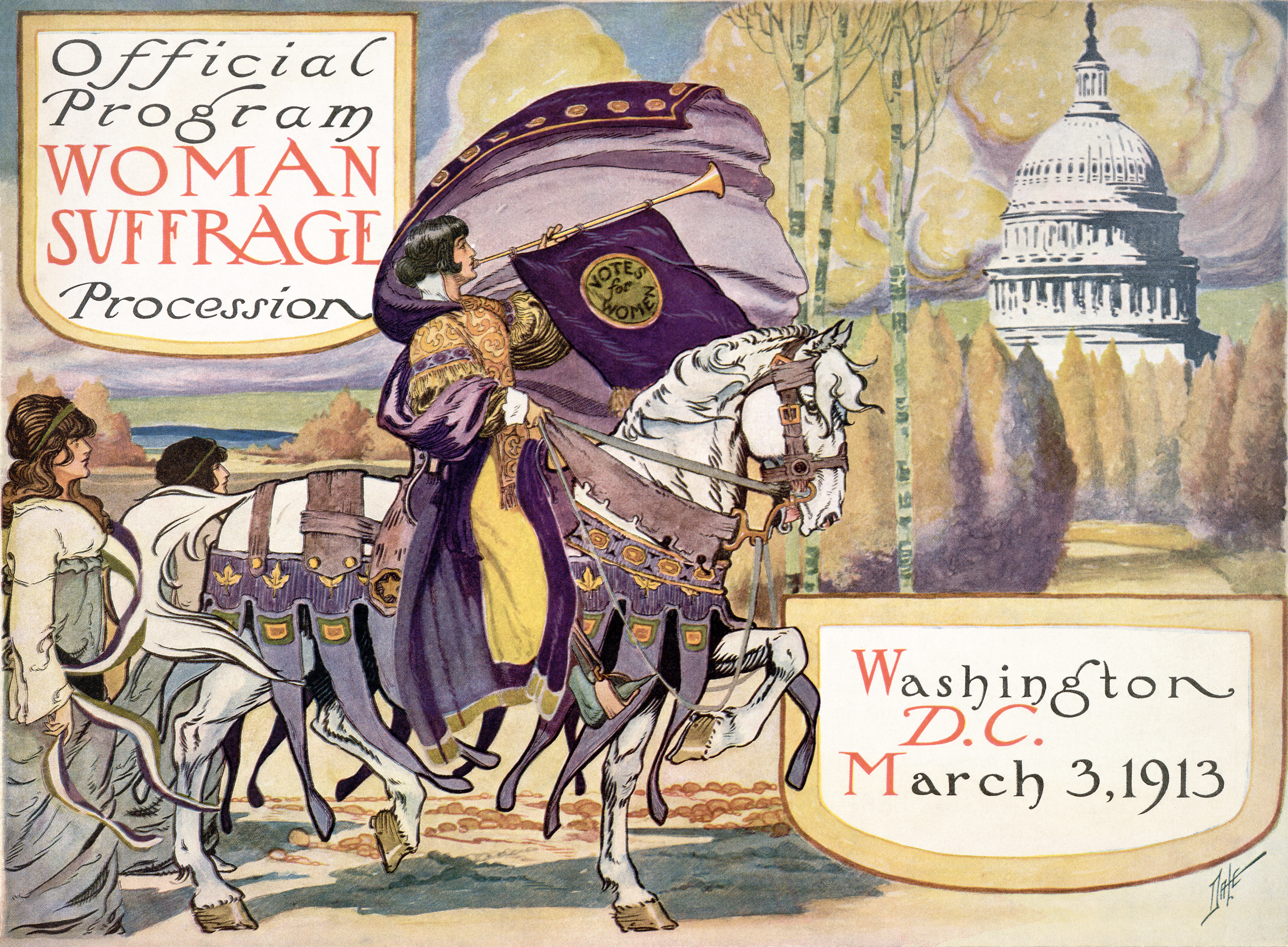
Official program of the Woman Suffrage Procession of 1913. In the actual march, the woman on horseback was Inez Milholland.

The concept of the New Woman emerged in the late nineteenth century to characterize the increasingly independent activity of women, especially the younger generation. According to one scholar, "The New Woman became associated with the rise of feminism and the campaign for women's suffrage, as well as with the rise of consumerism, mass culture, and freer expressions of sexuality that defined the first decades of the 20th century."

The move of women into public spaces was expressed in many ways. In the late 1890s, riding bicycles was a newly popular activity that increased women's mobility even as it signaled rejection of traditional teachings about women's weakness and fragility. Susan B. Anthony said bicycles had "done more to emancipate women than anything else in the world". Elizabeth Cady Stanton said that "Woman is riding to suffrage on the bicycle.

Film of suffragettes marching from Newark, New Jersey to Washington, DC in 1913.

Activists campaigned for suffrage in ways that were still considered by many to be "unladylike," such as marching in parades and giving street corner speeches on soap boxes. In New York in 1912, suffragists organized a twelve-day, 170-mile "Hike to Albany" to deliver suffrage petitions to the new governor. In 1913 the suffragist "Army of the Hudson" marched 250 miles from New York to Washington in sixteen days, gaining national publicity.

=== New suffrage organizations ===
==== College Equal Suffrage League ====
When Maud Wood Park attended the NAWSA convention in 1900, she found herself to be virtually the only young person there. After returning to Boston, she formed the College Equal Suffrage League with the assistance of fellow Radcliffe alumnae Inez Haynes Irwin and affiliated it with the NAWSA. Largely through Park's efforts, similar groups were organized on campuses in 30 states, leading to the formation of the National College Equal Suffrage League in 1908.

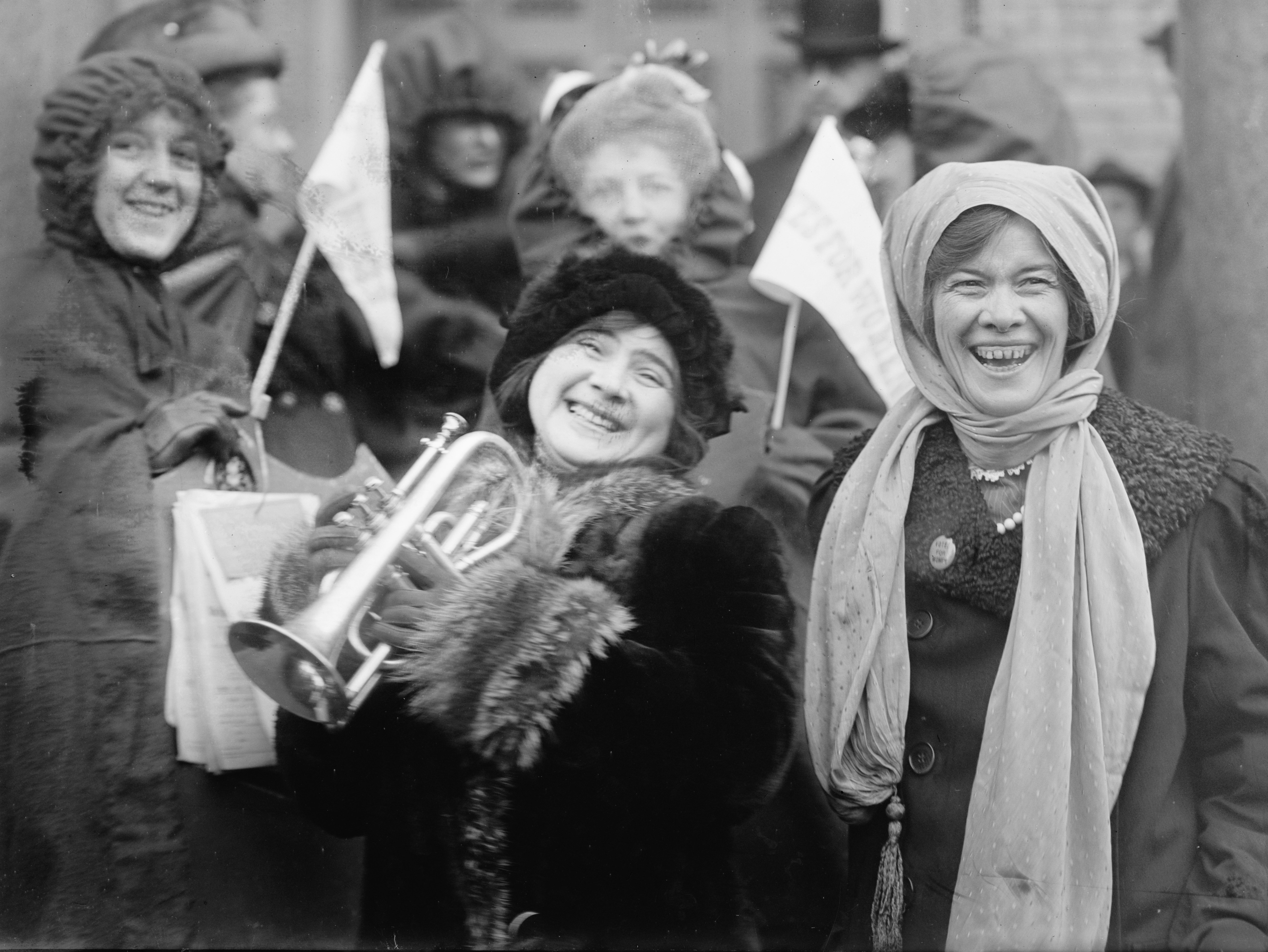
Women suffragists demonstrating for the right to vote in 1913.

==== Equality League of Self-Supporting Women ====
The dramatic tactics of the militant wing of the British suffrage movement began to influence the movement in the U.S. Harriet Stanton Blatch, daughter of Elizabeth Cady Stanton, returned to the U.S. after several years in England, where she had associated with suffrage groups still in the early phases of militancy. In 1907, she founded the Equality League of Self-Supporting Women, later called the Women's Political Union, whose membership was based on working women, both professional and industrial. The Equality League initiated the practice of holding suffrage parades and organized the first open air suffrage rallies in thirty years. As many as 25,000 people marched in these parades

==== National Council of Women Voters ====
The National Council of Women Voters (NCWV) was founded in 1911 to represent women in states where women's suffrage had been achieved. Initially those states were Wyoming, Colorado, Idaho, Utah and Washington. Some other states, including California, followed soon after. Emma Smith Devoe served as the NCWV's president throughout its nine-year life. She had been president of the Washington Equal Suffrage Association during the successful suffrage campaign in that state in 1910. Operating as a political pressure group, the NCWV worked for laws of interest to women in the states where women could vote. As suffrage was achieved in additional states, the NCWV was increasingly able to use its political power to promote passage of the Nineteenth Amendment. After its passage, the NCWV and the NAWSA combined to form the League of Women Voters.

==== National Woman's Party ====
Work toward a national suffrage amendment had been sharply curtailed in favor of state suffrage campaigns after the two rival suffrage organizations merged in 1890 to form the NAWSA. Interest in a national suffrage amendment was revived primarily by Alice Paul. In 1910, she returned to the U.S. from England, where she had been part of the militant wing of the suffrage movement. Paul had been jailed there and had endured forced feedings after going on a hunger strike. In January 1913, she arrived in Washington as chair of the Congressional Committee of the NAWSA, charged with reviving the drive for a constitutional amendment that would enfranchise women. She and her coworker Lucy Burns organized a suffrage parade in Washington on the day before Woodrow Wilson's inauguration as president. Opponents of the march turned the event into a near riot, which ended only when a cavalry unit of the army was brought in to restore order. Public outrage over the incident, which cost the chief of police his job, brought publicity to the movement and gave it fresh momentum. In 1914, Paul and her followers began referring to the proposed suffrage amendment as the "Susan B. Anthony Amendment," a name that was widely adopted.

Paul argued that because the Democrats would not act to enfranchise women even though they controlled the presidency and both houses of Congress, the suffrage movement should work for the defeat of all Democratic candidates regardless of an individual candidate's position on suffrage. She and Burns formed a separate lobbying group called the Congressional Union to act on this approach. Strongly disagreeing, the NAWSA in 1913 withdrew support from Paul's group and continued its practice of supporting any candidate who supported suffrage, regardless of political party. In 1916 Blatch merged her Women's Political Union into Paul's Congressional Union.

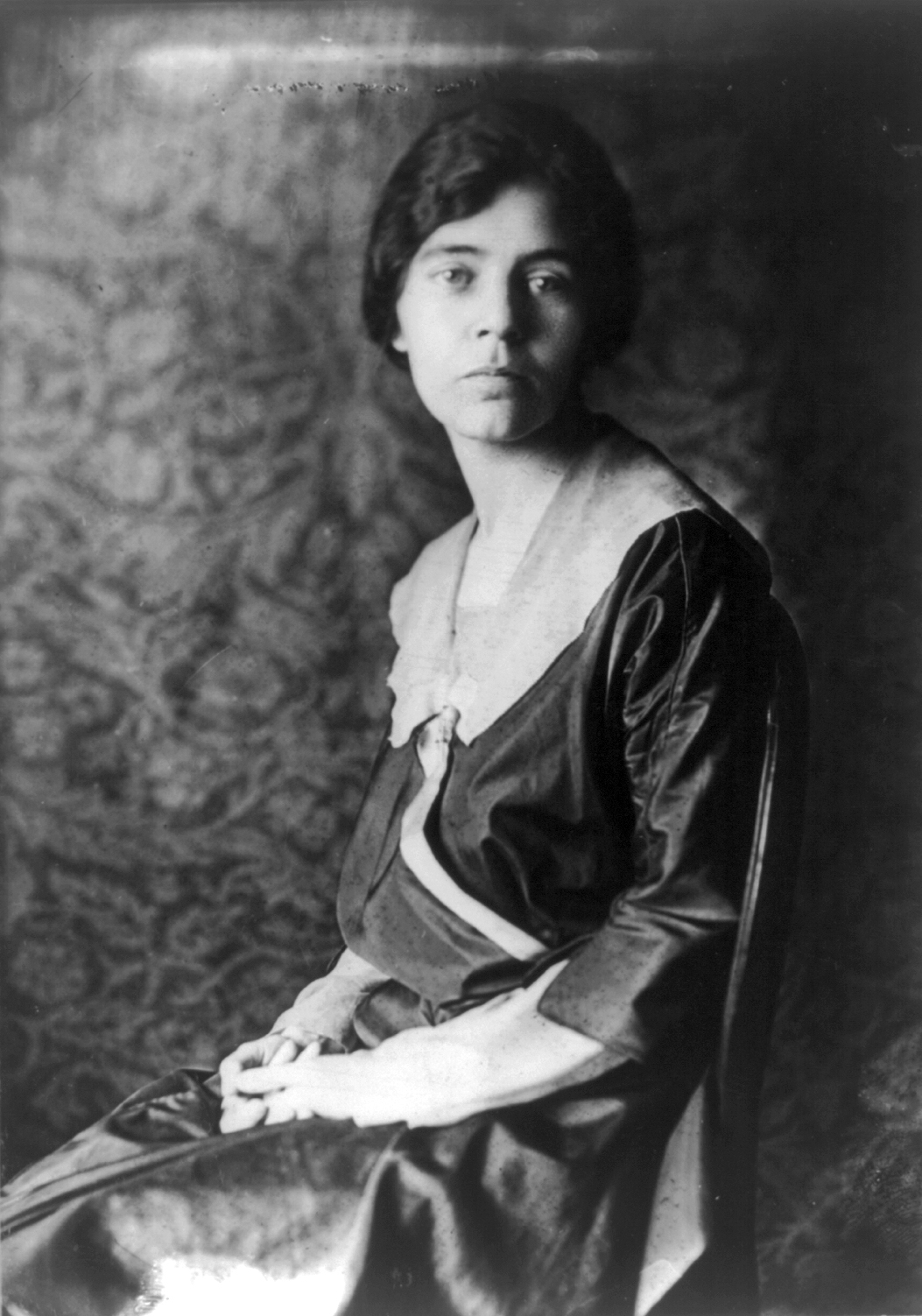
Alice Paul

In 1916 Paul formed the National Woman's Party (NWP). Once again the women's movement had split, but the result this time was something like a division of labor. The NAWSA burnished its image of respectability and engaged in highly organized lobbying at both the national and state levels. The smaller NWP also engaged in lobbying but became increasingly known for activities that were dramatic and confrontational, most often in the national capital. One form of protest was the watchfires, which involved burning copies of President Wilson's speeches, often outside the White House or in the nearby Lafayette Park. The NWP continued to hold watchfires even as the war began, drawing criticism from the public and even other suffrage groups for being unpatriotic.

==== Southern States Woman Suffrage Conference ====
The leaders of the NAWSA's Southern Strategy began to find their own voice by 1913 when Kate Gordon of Louisiana and Laura Clay of Kentucky formed the Southern States Woman Suffrage Conference (SSWSC). The suffragists of the SSWSC chose to work within the Jim Crow customs of their states and spoke openly about how the enfranchisement of white women would enhance the socio-economic and political work inherent to white supremacy. To clarify how their political ideology fit within the increasingly rigid status quo of segregation, they published a newspaper, New Southern Citizen, with the motto: "Make the Southern States White." The SSWSC became increasingly at odds with NAWSA and its primary focus on achieving a federal amendment. Most southern suffragists however disagreed and continued to work in affiliation with the NAWSA. Gordon actively campaigned against the Nineteenth Amendment since, in theory, it would also enfranchise African-American women. This would, as Laura Clay stated in a debate with Kentucky Equal Rights Association president Madeline McDowell Breckinridge, raise the spectre of Reconstruction Era interventions and bring increased federal scrutiny of elections in the South.

Alpha Suffrage Club

This organization was created by Ida B. Wells in 1913, with the hope of furthering women's right in the United States. Coming out of Chicago, Illinois, with the help of activist like Belle Squire and Virginia Brooks. The group worked to advocate for the overall African American women's suffrage movement. The club encouraged Black women's political participation and addressed their marginalization from standard suffrage organizations. One group being the National American Women Suffrage Association (NAWSA) and individuals such as Alice Paul. Its main goals were to support the election of candidates who would reflect the interests of Black communities, educate African American women about civic engagement, and promote voter participation in elections. Wells's leadership as the National Afro-American Council's Anti-Lynching Bureau Director is highlighted in The Appeal (Minneapolis, July 19, 1902). These documents also demonstrate Wells's enduring dedication to racial justice and support for Black communities, which influenced her suffrage work. The clubs efforts to educate and mobilize African American women voters is shown in the organizations official publication, The Alpha Suffrage Record (Vol. 1, No. 1 March 18, 1914).

=== Suffrage periodicals ===
Stanton and Anthony launched a sixteen-page weekly newspaper called The Revolution in 1868. It focused primarily on women's rights, especially suffrage, but it also covered politics, the labor movement, and other topics. Its energetic and broad-ranging style gave it a lasting influence, but its debts mounted when it did not receive the funding they had expected, and they had to transfer the paper to other hands after only twenty-nine months. Their organization, the NWSA, afterwards depended on other periodicals, such as The National Citizen and Ballot Box, edited by Matilda Joslyn Gage, and The Woman's Tribune, edited by Clara Bewick Colby, to represent its viewpoint.

In 1870, shortly after the formation of the AWSA, Lucy Stone launched an eight-page weekly newspaper called the Woman's Journal to advocate for women's rights, especially suffrage. Better financed and less radical than The Revolution, it had a much longer life. By the 1880s it had become an unofficial voice of the suffrage movement as a whole. In 1916 the NAWSA purchased the Woman's Journal and spent a significant amount of money to enhance it. It was renamed Woman Citizen and declared to be the official organ of the NAWSA.

Alice Paul began publishing a newspaper called The Suffragist in 1913 when she was still part of the NAWSA. Editor of the eight-page weekly was Rheta Childe Dorr, an experienced journalist.

=== Turn of the tide ===
New Zealand enfranchised women in 1893, the first country to do so on a nationwide basis. In the U.S., women gained the franchise in the states of Washington in 1910; in California in 1911; in Oregon, Kansas and Arizona in 1912; and in Illinois in 1913. Some states allowed women to vote in school elections, municipal elections, or for members of the Electoral College. Some territories, like Washington, Utah, and Wyoming, allowed women to vote before they became states. As women voted in an increasing number of states, Congressmen from those states swung to support a national suffrage amendment, and paid more attention to issues such as child labor.

The status of women's suffrage before passage of the Nineteenth Amendment in 1920 Full suffrage Presidential suffrage (vote only for president) Primary suffrage (vote only in primary elections) Municipal suffrage (vote only in city elections) School, bond, or tax suffrage (vote only in special elections) Municipal suffrage in some cities Primary suffrage in some cities No suffrage

The reform campaigns of the Progressive Era strengthened the suffrage movement. Beginning around 1900, this broad movement began at the grassroots level with such goals as combating corruption in government, eliminating child labor, and protecting workers and consumers. Many of its participants saw women's suffrage as yet another progressive goal, and they believed that the addition of women to the electorate would help their movement achieve its other goals. In 1912, the Progressive Party, formed by Theodore Roosevelt, endorsed women's suffrage. The socialist movement supported women's suffrage in some areas.

By 1916, suffrage for women had become a major national issue, and the NAWSA had become the nation's largest voluntary organization, with two million members. In 1916, the conventions of both the Democratic and Republican parties endorsed women's suffrage, but only on a state-by-state basis, with the implication that the various states might implement suffrage in different ways or (in some cases) not at all. Having expected more, Catt called an emergency NAWSA convention and proposed what became known as the "Winning Plan". For several years, the NAWSA had focused on achieving suffrage on a state-by-state basis, partly to accommodate members from Southern states who opposed the idea of a national suffrage amendment, considering it an infringement on states' rights. In a strategic shift, the 1916 convention approved Catt's proposal to make a national amendment the priority for the entire organization. It authorized the executive board to specify a plan of work toward this goal for each state and to take over that work if the state organization refused to comply.

In 1917, Catt received a bequest of $900,000 from Mrs. Frank (Miriam) Leslie to be used for the women's suffrage movement. Catt formed the Leslie Woman Suffrage Commission to dispense the funds, most of which supported the activities of the NAWSA at a crucial time for the suffrage movement.

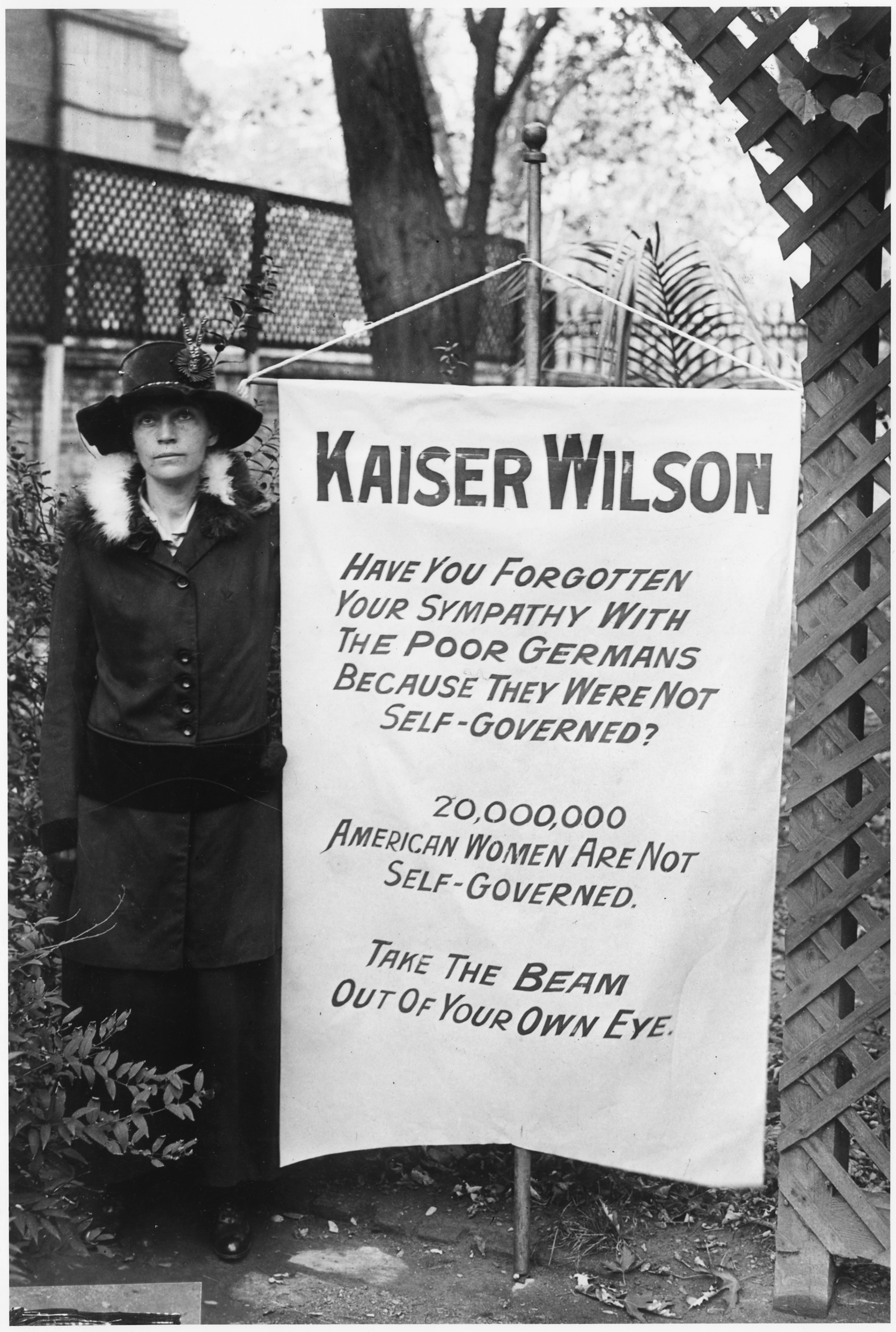
"Kaiser Wilson" banner held by an NWP member picketing the White House

In January 1917, the NWP stationed pickets at the White House, which had never before been picketed, with banners demanding women's suffrage. Tension escalated in June as a Russian delegation drove up to the White House and NPW members unfurled a banner that read, "We, the women of America, tell you that America is not a democracy. Twenty million American women are denied the right to vote. President Wilson is the chief opponent of their national enfranchisement". In August, another banner referred to "Kaiser Wilson" and compared the plight of the German people with that of American women.

Some of the onlookers, including crowds of drunken men in town for the second inauguration of Woodrow Wilson, reacted violently, tearing the banners from the picketers' hands. The police, whose actions had previously been restrained, began arresting the picketers for blocking the sidewalk. Eventually over 200 were arrested, about half of whom were sent to prison. In October Alice Paul was sentenced to seven months in prison. When she and other suffragist prisoners began a hunger strike, prison authorities force-fed them. The negative publicity created by this harsh practice increased the pressure on the administration, which capitulated and released all the prisoners.

The entry of the U.S. into World War I in April 1917, had a significant impact on the suffrage movement. To replace men who had gone into the military, women moved into workplaces that did not traditionally hire women, such as steel mills and oil refineries. The NAWSA cooperated with the war effort, with Catt and Shaw serving on the Women's Committee for the Council of National Defense. The NWP, by contrast, took no steps to cooperate with the war effort. Jeannette Rankin, elected in 1916 by Montana as the first woman in Congress, was one of fifty members of Congress to vote against the declaration of war.

In November 1917, a referendum to enfranchise women in New York – at that time the most populous state in the country – passed by a substantial margin. In September 1918, President Wilson spoke before the Senate, calling for approval of the suffrage amendment as a war measure, saying "We have made partners of the women in this war; shall we admit them only to a partnership of suffering and sacrifice and toil and not to a partnership of privilege and right?" In the 1918 elections, despite the threat of Spanish flu, three additional states (Oklahoma, South Dakota, and Michigan) passed ballot initiatives to enfranchise women, and two incumbent senators (John W. Weeks of Massachusetts and Willard Saulsbury Jr. of Delaware) lost re-election campaigns due to their opposition to suffrage. By the end of 1919, women effectively could vote for president in states with 326 electoral votes out of a total of 531. Political leaders who became convinced of the inevitability of women's suffrage began to pressure local and national legislators to support it so that their respective party could claim credit for it in future elections.

The war served as a catalyst for suffrage extension in several countries, with women gaining the vote after years of campaigning partly in recognition of their support for the war effort, which further increased the pressure for suffrage in the U.S. About half of the women in Britain had become enfranchised by January 1918, as had women in most Canadian provinces, with Quebec the major exception.

=== Nineteenth Amendment ===
To get the word male in effect out of the Constitution cost the women of the country fifty-two years of pauseless campaign...During that time they were forced to conduct fifty-six campaigns of referenda to male voters; 480 campaigns to get Legislatures to submit suffrage amendments to voters; 47 campaigns to get State constitutional conventions to write woman suffrage into State constitutions; 277 campaigns to get State party conventions to include woman suffrage planks; 30 campaigns to get presidential party conventions to adopt woman suffrage planks in party platforms, and 19 campaigns with 19 successive Congresses. Millions of dollars were raised, mainly in small sums, and expended with economic care. Hundreds of women gave the accumulated possibilities of an entire lifetime, thousands gave years of their lives, hundreds of thousands gave constant interest and such aid as they could.

— Carrie Chapman Catt, president of the National American Woman Suffrage Association.

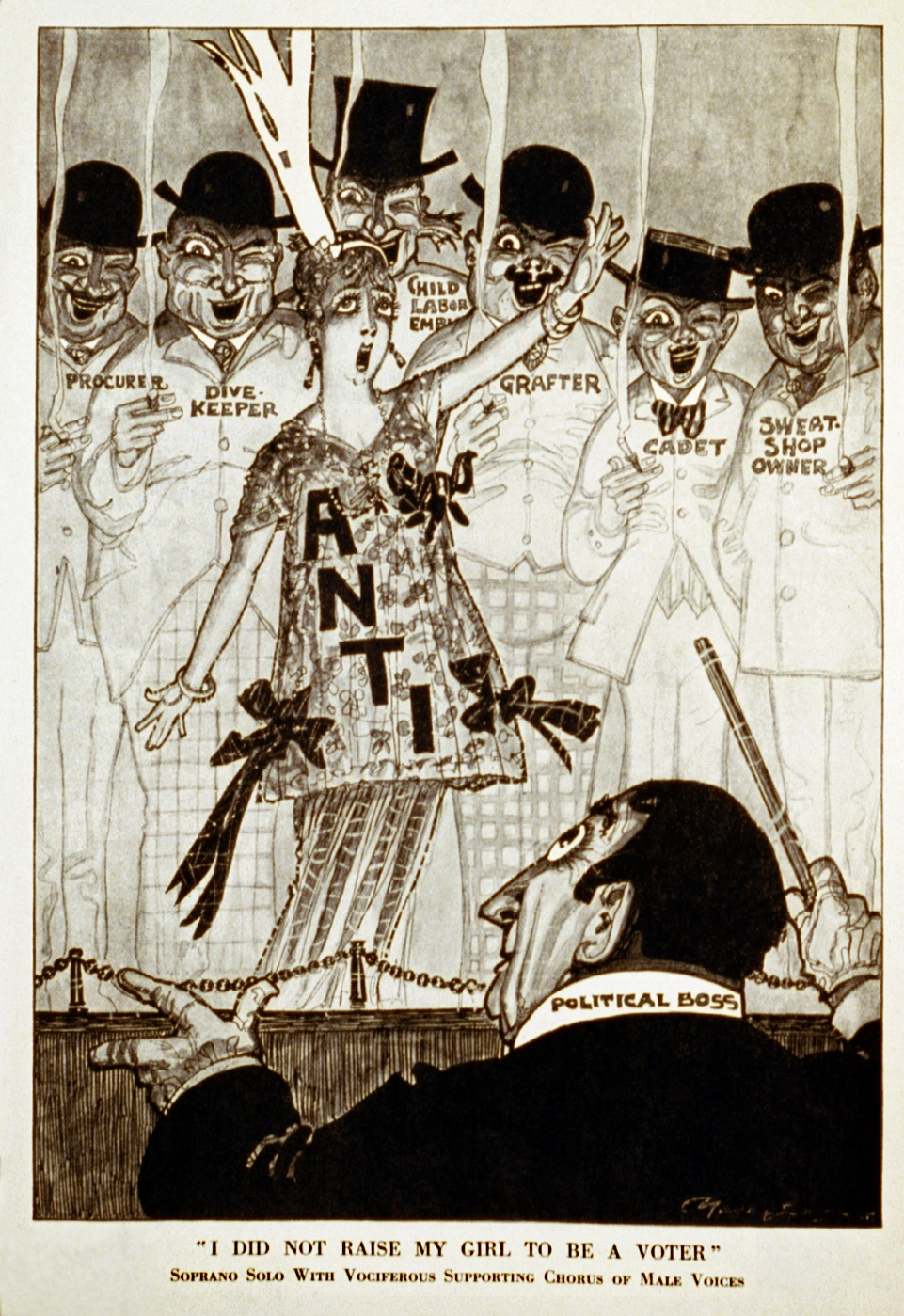
A chorus of disreputable men supports an anti-suffrage woman in this 1915 cartoon from Puck magazine. The caption "I did not raise my girl to be a voter" parodies the antiwar song "I Didn't Raise My Boy To Be A Soldier".

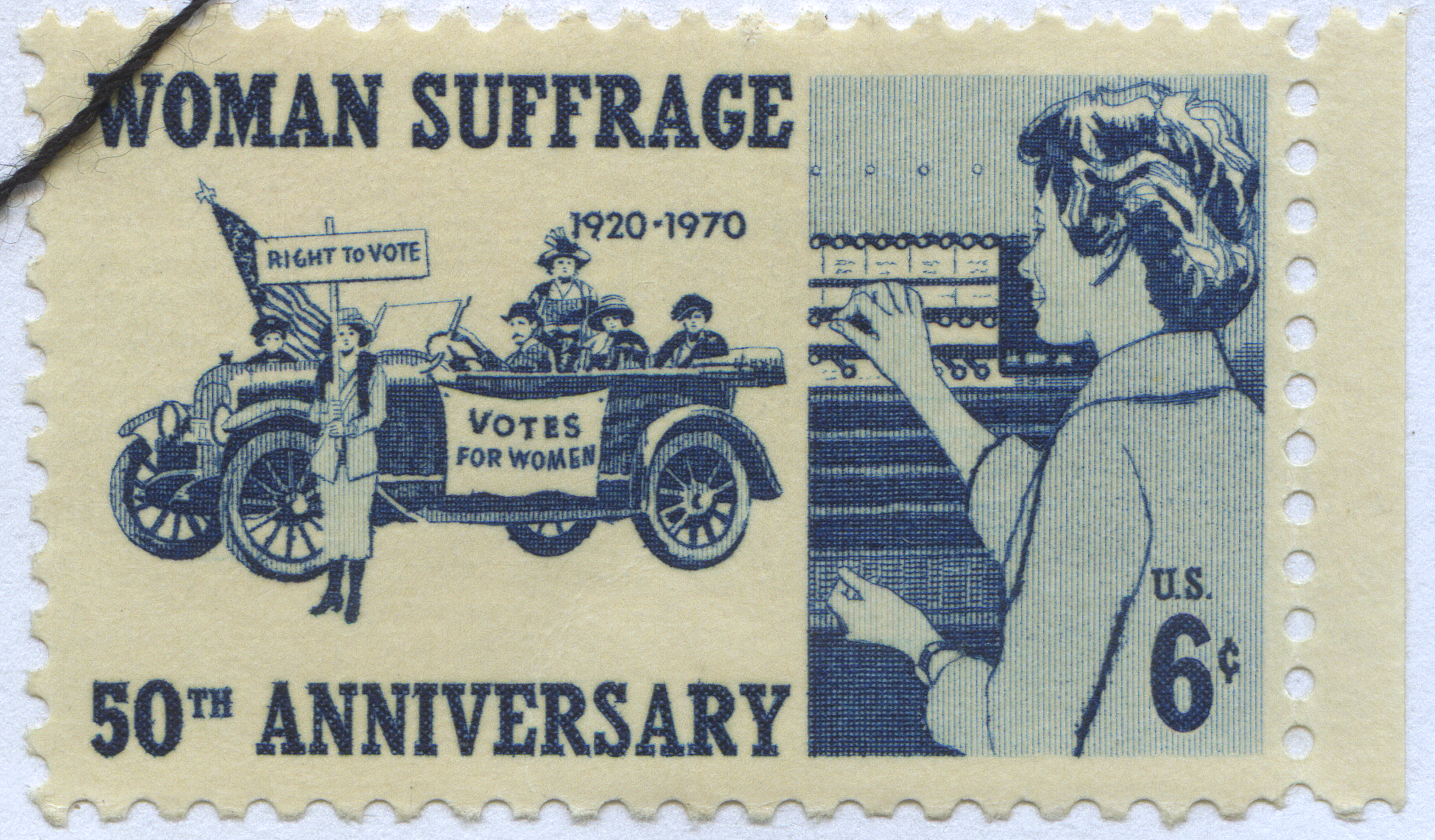
US Stamp from 1970 celebrating 50 years of woman suffrage

World War I had a profound impact on woman suffrage across the belligerents. Women played a major role on the home fronts and many countries recognized their sacrifices with the vote during or shortly after the war, including the U.S., Britain, Canada (except Quebec), Denmark, Austria, the Netherlands, Germany, Russia, Sweden; and Ireland introduced universal suffrage with independence. France almost did so but stopped short. Despite their eventual success, groups like the National Woman's Party that continued militant protests during wartime were criticized by other suffrage groups and the public, who viewed it as unpatriotic.

On January 12, 1915, a suffrage bill was brought before the House of Representatives but was defeated by a vote of 204 to 174, (Democrats 170–85 against, Republicans 81–34 for, Progressives 6–0 for). President Woodrow Wilson held off until he was sure the Democratic Party was supportive; the 1917 referendum in New York State in favor of suffrage proved decisive for him. When another bill was brought before the House in January 1918, Wilson made a strong and widely published appeal to the House to pass the bill. Behn argues that:

The National American Woman Suffrage Association, not the National Woman's Party, was decisive in Wilson's conversion to the cause of the federal amendment because its approach mirrored his own conservative vision of the appropriate method of reform: win a broad consensus, develop a legitimate rationale, and make the issue politically valuable. Additionally, I contend that Wilson did have a significant role to play in the successful congressional passage and national ratification of the 19th Amendment.

The Amendment passed by two-thirds of the House, with only one vote to spare. The vote was then carried into the Senate. Again President Wilson made an appeal, but on September 30, 1918, the amendment fell two votes short of the two-thirds necessary for passage, 53–31 (Republicans 27–10 for, Democrats 26–21 for). On February 10, 1919, it was again voted upon, and then it was lost by only one vote, 54–30 (Republicans 30–12 for, Democrats 24–18 for).

There was considerable anxiety among politicians of both parties to have the amendment passed and made effective before the general elections of 1920, so the President called a special session of Congress, and a bill, introducing the amendment, was brought before the House again. On May 21, 1919, it was passed, 304 to 89, (Republicans 200-19 for, Democrats 102-69 for, Union Labor 1-0 for, Prohibitionist 1-0 for), 42 votes more than necessary being obtained. On June 4, 1919, it was brought before the Senate, and after a long discussion it was passed, with 56 ayes and 25 nays (Republicans 36-8 for, Democrats 20-17 for). Within a few days, Wisconsin, Illinois, and Michigan ratified the amendment, their legislatures being then in session. Other states followed suit at a regular pace, until the amendment had been ratified by 35 of the necessary 36 state legislatures. After Washington on March 22, 1920, ratification languished for months. Finally, on August 18, 1920, Tennessee narrowly ratified the Nineteenth Amendment, making it the law throughout the United States. Thus the 1920 election became the first United States presidential election in which women were permitted to vote in every state.

Three other states, Connecticut, Vermont and Delaware, passed the amendment by 1923. They were eventually followed by others in the south. Nearly twenty years later, Maryland ratified the amendment in 1941. After another ten years, in 1952, Virginia ratified the Nineteenth Amendment, followed by Alabama in 1953. After another 16 years, Florida and South Carolina passed the necessary votes to ratify in 1969, followed two years later by Georgia, Louisiana and North Carolina.

Mississippi did not ratify the Nineteenth Amendment until 1984, sixty four years after the law was enacted nationally. Mississippi would go on to be the second last state to elect a woman to congress, with the first female in the Mississippi congressional delegation being Cindy Hyde-Smith, elected in 2018. (Note: Vermont was the last state, electing its first Congresswoman in 2022.)

.

== Effects of the Nineteenth Amendment ==
=== In the United States ===
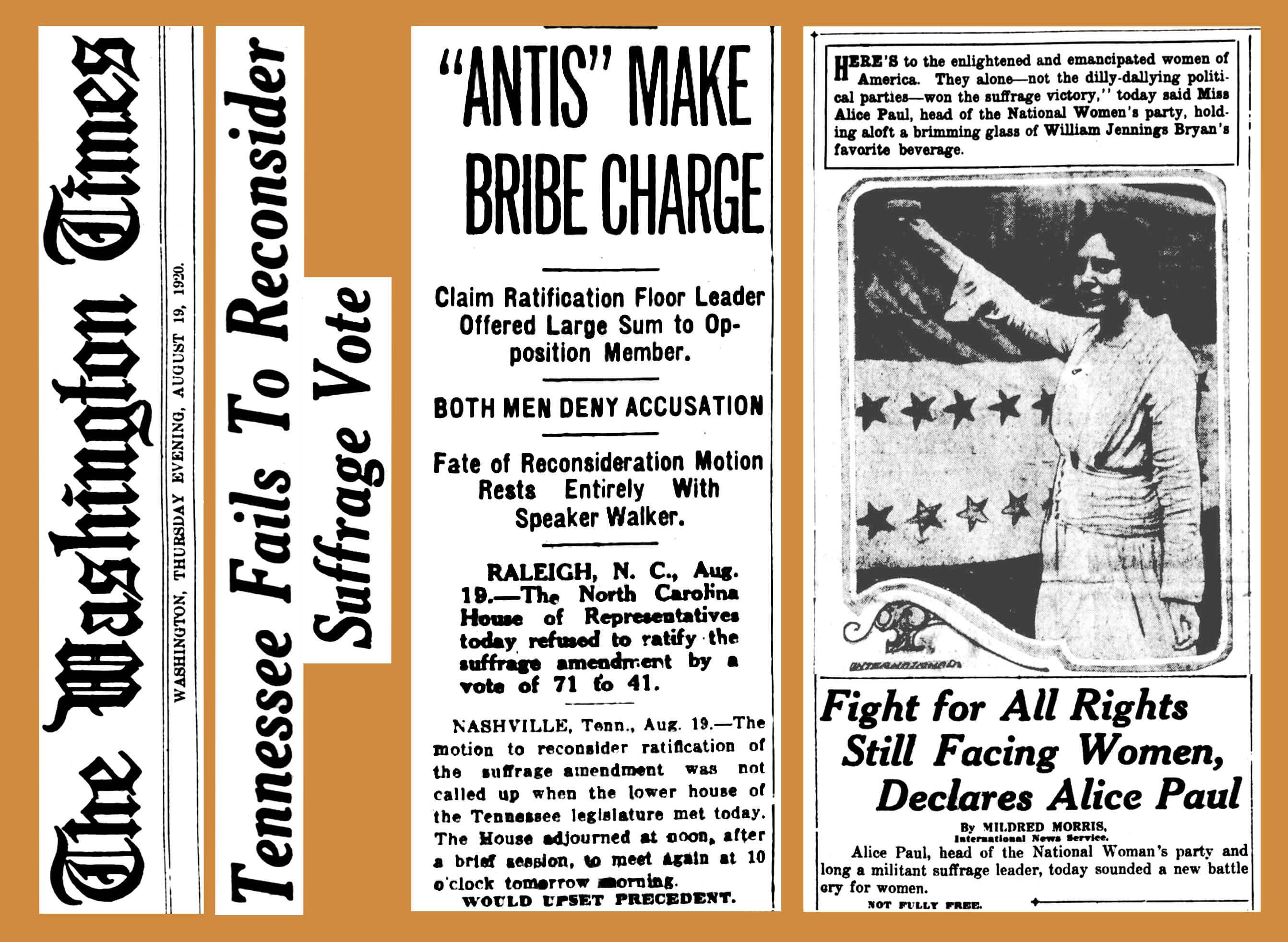
After ratification, Alice Paul warned that "women are not yet fully free" and that women "can expect nothing from the politicians...until they stand as a unit in a party of their own", saying that discrimination still exists "on the statute books which will not be removed by the ratification". Paul charged that the amendment passed only because "it at last became more expedient for those in control of the Government to aid suffrage than to oppose it".

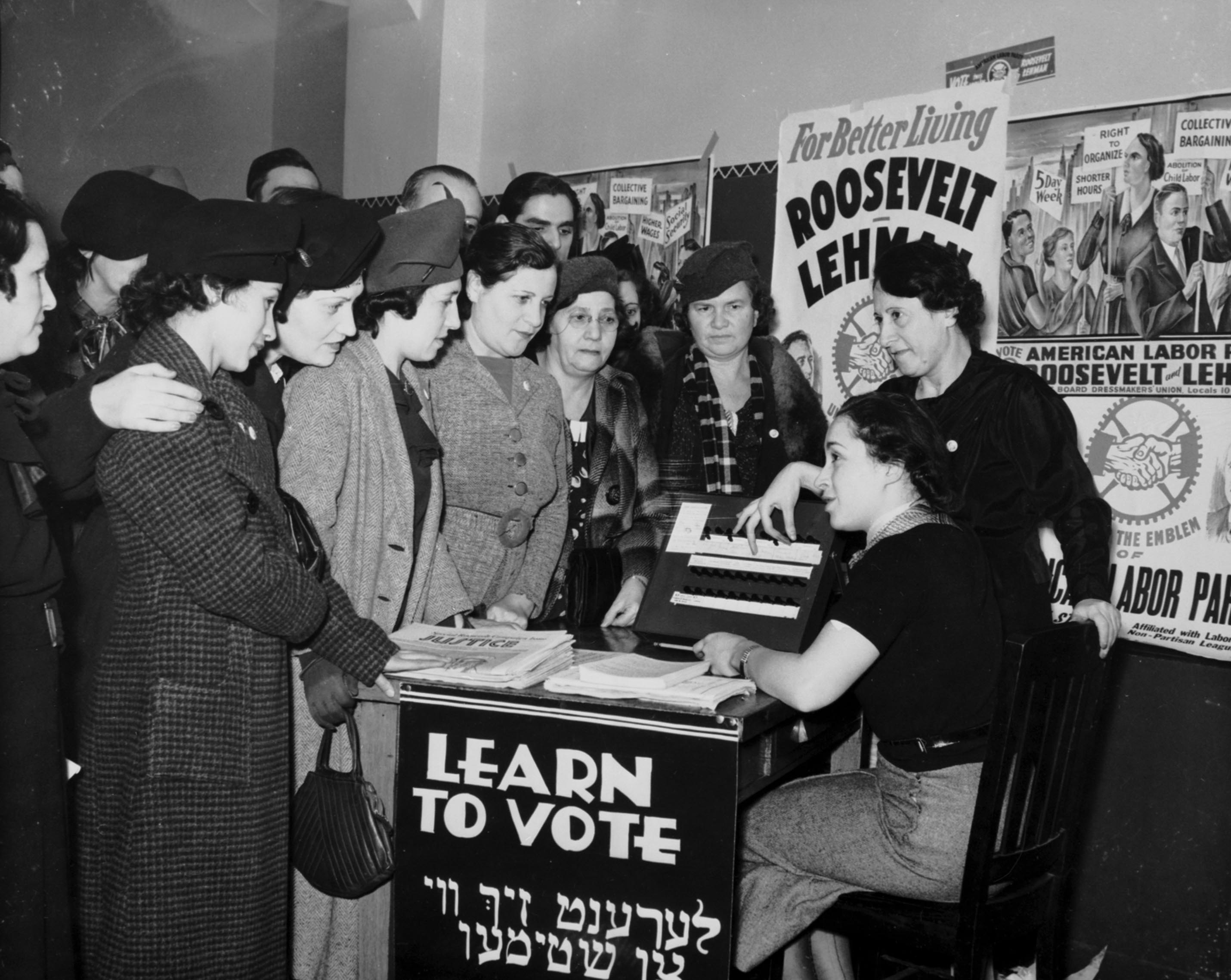
Women surrounded by posters in English and Yiddish supporting Franklin D. Roosevelt, Herbert H. Lehman, and the American Labor Party teach other women how to vote, 1936.

Politicians responded to the newly enlarged electorate by emphasizing issues of special interest to women, especially prohibition, child health, public schools, and world peace. Women did respond to these issues, but in terms of general voting they had the same outlook and the same voting behavior as men.

The suffrage organization NAWSA became the League of Women Voters and Alice Paul's National Woman's Party began lobbying for full equality and the Equal Rights Amendment which would pass Congress during the second wave of the women's movement in 1972 (but it was not ratified and never took effect). The main surge of women voting came in 1928, when the big-city machines realized they needed the support of women to elect Al Smith, while rural drys mobilized women to support Prohibition and vote for Republican Herbert Hoover. Catholic women were reluctant to vote in the early 1920s, but they registered in very large numbers for the 1928 election – the first in which Catholicism was a major issue. A few women were elected to office, but none became especially prominent during this time period. Overall, the women's rights movement declined noticeably during the 1920s.

Passage of the Nineteenth Amendment did not in actual practice provide suffrage to all women in the United States. Women's rights to a public identity were restricted by the common law practice of coverture. As women were not citizens in their own right and married women were required to assume the citizenship and residency requirements of their spouses, many women upon marriage had no voting rights. The Naturalization Act of 1790 granted any free white, who met character and residency policies, the right to become a citizen and the 14th Amendment extended citizenship to those born in the United States, including African-Americans. Rulings by the Supreme Court allowed racial limitations to naturalization of people who were neither black nor white. This meant that Latinos, Asians, and Eastern Europeans, among other groups, were at various times barred from becoming citizens. Exclusions based on race also applied to Native American women living on reservations, until the passage in 1924 of the Indian Citizenship Act. As a result, if an American woman married someone who was ineligible for naturalization, until passage of the Cable Act of 1922 and various amendments, she lost her citizenship.

As the US Constitution grants states the ability to determine who is eligible to vote in elections, until the passage of the Voting Rights Act of 1965, legislative variations among the states, led to extremely different civil rights for women within the federal system depending upon their residency. Restrictions on literacy, moral character, and ability to pay poll taxes were used to legally exclude women from voting. Large numbers of African American women, as well as men, continued to be denied suffrage in the southern states. Latinos and non-English speaking women were routinely excluded by literacy requirements in the northern states, and many poor women, regardless of race, had no ability to pay poll taxes. As married women's wages and legal access to money were controlled by their husbands, many married women had no ability to pay poll taxes. In 1940, US women were granted their own legal status as citizens and provisions were made for women who had previously lost their citizenship through marriage to regain it.

=== Native American women ===
The early women's suffrage movement had drawn inspiration from the political egalitarianism of Iroquois society. Native American women and men were nominally granted the right to vote in 1924 with the passage of the Indian Citizenship Act. Even so, until the 1950s, some states barred Native Americans from voting unless they had adopted the culture and language of American society, relinquished their tribal memberships, or moved to urban areas. Universal suffrage was not guaranteed in practice until the passing of the Voting Rights Act of 1965. Voters in Indian country continue to face certain barriers to political participation.

The government of the Seneca Nation of Indians denied women the right to vote until the early 1960s; this despite the traditional pre-republic structure in which women were granted the right to choose chiefs. The nation's male voters rejected female suffrage in three consecutive referendums in the 1950s, all rejected with widespread opposition from the Allegany Reservation, before the referendum finally passed in 1964, with women granted the right to hold office in 1966.

=== In U.S. territories ===
At the time the 19th Amendment was passed, both Puerto Rico and the Virgin Islands were unincorporated territories of the United States. Suffragists believed that women in the Virgin Islands had been enfranchised when the Danish extended suffrage in 1915, as at that time the Danish West Indies were their possession. Similarly, as Puerto Ricans were confirmed to be U. S. citizens in 1917, it was assumed that suffrage had been extended there as well with the passage of the 19th Amendment. Upon questioning its applicability in Puerto Rico, Governor Arthur Yager received clarification from the Bureau of Insular Affairs that passage or ratification in the states would not grant women's suffrage in Puerto Rico, because of the island's unincorporated status. In 1921, the U.S. Supreme Court clarified that constitutional rights did not extend to residents in the two territories as they were defined in Puerto Rico by the Organic Act of 1900 and in the Virgin Islands by the Danish Colonial Law of 1906.

Suffragists and their supporters unsuccessfully introduced enfranchisement bills to the insular legislature in Puerto Rico in 1919, 1921, and 1923. In 1924, Milagros Benet de Mewton sued the electoral board for refusing to allow her to register. Her case argued that as a U.S. citizen, she should be allowed to vote in accordance with the U.S. Constitution, because territorial law was not allowed to contravene U.S. law. The Supreme Court of Puerto Rico ruled that the electoral law was not discriminatory because Puerto Ricans were not allowed to vote for federal electors, and that the territory, like U.S. states, retained the right to define who was eligible to vote. Another failed bill, in 1927, led Benet and women involved in the Pan-American Women's Association to press the US Congress to enfranchise Puerto Rican women. When in 1928, the bill passed out of committee and was scheduled for a vote the U. S. House of Representatives, the Puerto Rican legislature realized that if they did not extend suffrage the federal government would. They passed a limited suffrage bill on April 16, 1929, limiting voting rights to literate women. Universal suffrage was finally achieved in Puerto Rico in 1936, when a bill submitted by the Socialist Party the previous year, gained approval in the insular legislature.

In the US Virgin Islands, voting was restricted to men who were literate and owned property. Teachers like Edith L. Williams and Mildred V. Anduze pressed for women to gain the vote. In 1935, the Saint Thomas Teachers' Association filed a lawsuit challenging the applicability of the 19th amendment to Virgin Islanders. In November 1935, the court ruled that the Danish Colonial Law was unconstitutional as it conflicted with the 19th Amendment and that it had not been the intent to limit the franchise to men. To test the law, Williams attempted to register to vote and encouraged other teachers to do so, but their applications were refused. Williams, Eulalie Stevens and Anna M. Vessup, all literate, property owners, petitioned the court to open elections to qualified women. Judge Albert Levitt ruled in favor of the women on December 27, which led to mobilization to register to vote in Saint Croix and Saint John.

Though Guam was acquired by the United States at the same time as Puerto Rico, the 19th Amendment was not extended by the US Congress to Guamanians until 1968. Congress also extended it to the Northern Mariana Islands in 1976 under the Marianas Covenant. Though the US Congress has not verified the applicability of the Nineteenth Amendment to American Samoa the territorial constitution implies its applicability in the jurisdiction.

=== Changes in the voting population ===
Although restricting access to the polls because of sex was made unconstitutional in 1920, women did not turn out to the polls in the same numbers as men until 1980. A term commonly used that represents the push for equal representation in government is known as Mirror Representation. The amount of representation of sex in government should match the portion of that specific sex in the population. From 1980 until the present, women have voted in elections in at least the same percentage as have men, and often more. This difference in voting turnout and preferences between men and women is known as the voting gender gap. The voting gender gap has impacted political elections and, consequently, the way candidates campaign for office.

=== Changes in representation and government programs ===
After women gained the right to vote, the presence of women in Congress has gradually increased since 1920, with an especially steady increase from 1981. Today, women increasingly pursue politics as a career. At the state and national level, women have brought attention to gender-sensitive topics, gender equality, and children's rights. Women's participation rate is higher at local levels of government.

In 1972, Shirley Chisholm became the first woman to run for the Democratic Party's presidential nomination.

In 1984, Geraldine Ferraro became the first woman vice presidential candidate to be nominated by a major party.

In 2016, Hillary Clinton became the first female presidential candidate to be nominated by a major party.

In 2019, 25 out of 100 senators were women, and 102 out of 435 representatives were women. This resembled the global average; around the world, in 2018, just under a quarter of national-level parliament representatives were women.

In 2021, Vice President Kamala Harris became the highest-ranking female elected official in U.S. history after assuming office alongside President Joe Biden.

=== Notable legislation ===
Immediately following the ratification of the Nineteenth Amendment, many legislators feared a powerful women's bloc would emerge as a result of female enfranchisement. The Sheppard-Towner Act of 1921, which expanded maternity care during the 1920s, was one of the first laws passed appealing to the female vote.

Title IX is a federal civil rights law that was passed in 1972 as part (Title IX) of the Education Amendments of 1972. It prohibits sex-based discrimination in any school or other education program that receives federal money.

=== Socio-economic effects ===
A paper by John R. Lott and Lawrence W. Kenny, published by the Journal of Political Economy, found that women generally voted along more liberal political philosophies than men. The paper concluded that women's voting appeared to be more risk-averse than men and favored candidates or policies that supported wealth transfer, social insurance, progressive taxation, and larger government.

A 2020 study found that "exposure to suffrage during childhood led to large increases in educational attainment for children from disadvantaged backgrounds, especially black people and Southern white people. We also find that suffrage led to higher earnings alongside education gains, although not for Southern black people." These improvements are largely driven by suffrage-induced growth in education spending.

== Anti-suffragism after the nineteenth amendment ==
=== Modern era ===
In the 2020s, many American far-right figures began to call for the repeal of the Nineteenth Amendment, often connected with the Christian nationalist movement. This viewpoint came to more attention in August 2025, when U.S. Secretary of Defense Pete Hegseth reposted a video on Twitter featuring Doug Wilson, pastor of Christ Church in Moscow, Idaho, in which video participants discussed repealing the Nineteenth Amendment. In response, Hegseth's press secretary clarified that he supports women's suffrage. Hegseth's pastor, however, along with other senior figures in the Communion of Reformed Evangelical Churches, advocate repealing the Nineteenth Amendment in favor of "household voting," where households would receive a singular vote and the husband would get the final say in the event of disagreement.

Other notable political figures connected with this view include Paul Ingrassia, who appeared to endorse this viewpoint in a 2023 podcast interview, Paul Ray Ramsey, Dale Partridge, John Gibbs, and Andrew Tate. Anti-abortion advocate Abby Johnson has advocated replacing the current voting system with one of household voting.

In 2022, American political commentator and a far-right white nationalist, activist, Nick Fuentes told the British journalist Louis Theroux that he believes it would be better if women did not have the right to vote. In November 2025, Fuentes said that if he was elected president, he would "just take away the right to vote for tons of people. Women for sure."

== See also ==
- African-American women's suffrage movement
- Anti-suffragism
- Art in the women's suffrage movement in the United States
- California Proposition 4 (1911)
- League of Women Voters
- List of American suffragists
- List of suffragists and suffragettes
- List of women's rights activists
- List of women's rights conventions in the United States
- Music and women's suffrage in the United States
- Native Americans and women's suffrage in the United States
- Portrait Monument
- Silent Sentinels
- Suffrage
- Suffrage Hikes
- Timeline of women's legal rights (other than voting)
- Timeline of women's suffrage
- Women's suffrage in states of the United States
- Women in United States juries

=== Wikipedia articles on women's suffrage by state ===
State	Women's suffrage in	Timeline for	Associations
Alabama	Women's suffrage in Alabama	Timeline of women's suffrage in Alabama	League of Women Voters of Alabama
Alaska	Women's suffrage in Alaska	Timeline of women's suffrage in Alaska	
Arizona	Women's suffrage in Arizona	Timeline of women's suffrage in Arizona	
Arkansas	Women's suffrage in Arkansas	Timeline of women's suffrage in Arkansas	
California	Women's suffrage in California	Timeline of women's suffrage in California	California Equal Suffrage Association
Colorado	Women's suffrage in Colorado	Timeline of women's suffrage in Colorado	
Connecticut			Connecticut Woman Suffrage Association
Delaware	Women's suffrage in Delaware	Timeline of women's suffrage in Delaware	
Florida	Women's suffrage in Florida	Timeline of women's suffrage in Florida	League of Women Voters of Florida
Georgia	Women's suffrage in Georgia (U.S. state)	Timeline of women's suffrage in Georgia (U.S. state)	Georgia Woman Suffrage Association
Hawaii	Women's suffrage in Hawaii	Timeline of women's suffrage in Hawaii	
Idaho			
Illinois	Women's suffrage in Illinois	Timeline of women's suffrage in Illinois	League of Women Voters of Naperville
Indiana			
Iowa	Women's suffrage in Iowa	Timeline of women's suffrage in Iowa	
Kansas			
Kentucky			Kentucky Equal Rights Association
Louisiana			
Maine	Women's suffrage in Maine	Timeline of women's suffrage in Maine	
Maryland			Maryland Woman Suffrage Association
Massachusetts			Massachusetts Woman Suffrage Association
Michigan			
Minnesota			Minnesota Woman Suffrage Association
Mississippi			
Missouri	Women's suffrage in Missouri	Timeline of women's suffrage in Missouri	Missouri League of Women Voters
Montana	Women's suffrage in Montana	Timeline of women's suffrage in Montana	
Nebraska			
Nevada	Women's suffrage in Nevada	Timeline of women's suffrage in Nevada	
New Hampshire			
New Jersey	Women's suffrage in New Jersey	Timeline of women's suffrage in New Jersey	
New Mexico	Women's suffrage in New Mexico	Timeline of women's suffrage in New Mexico	
New York			
North Carolina			
North Dakota	Women's suffrage in North Dakota	Timeline of women's suffrage in North Dakota	
Ohio	Women's suffrage in Ohio	Timeline of women's suffrage in Ohio	
Oklahoma			
Oregon			
Pennsylvania	Women's suffrage in Pennsylvania	Timeline of women's suffrage in Pennsylvania	
Rhode Island	Women's suffrage in Rhode Island	Timeline of women's suffrage in Rhode Island	
South Carolina	Women's suffrage in South Carolina		South Carolina Equal Rights Association
South Dakota	Women's suffrage in South Dakota	Timeline of women's suffrage in South Dakota	
Tennessee			
Texas	Women's suffrage in Texas	Timeline of women's suffrage in Texas	Texas Equal Suffrage Association
			Texas Equal Rights Association
Utah	Women's suffrage in Utah	Timeline of women's suffrage in Utah	
Vermont			
Virginia	Women's suffrage in Virginia	Timeline of women's suffrage in Virginia	Equal Suffrage League of Virginia
Washington	Women's suffrage in Washington		
West Virginia			West Virginia Equal Suffrage Association
Wisconsin	Women's suffrage in Wisconsin	Timeline of women's suffrage in Wisconsin	
Wyoming	Women's suffrage in Wyoming		

== Bibliography ==
- Arnold, Kathleen R. (2011). Anti-immigration in the United States: A-R. Santa Barbara, CA: ABC-CLIO. ISBN 978-0-313-37521-7.
- Baker, Jean, ed. Votes for Women: The Struggle for Suffrage Revisited (2002) 11 essays by scholars
- Kathleen Barry (1988). Susan B. Anthony: A Biography of a Singular Feminist. New York: Ballantine Books. ISBN 0-345-36549-6.
- Carlson, Laura (2007). Searching for Equality: Sex Discrimination, Parental Leave, and the Swedish Model with Comparisons to EU, UK, and US Law. Uppsala, Sweden: Iustus Förlag. ISBN 978-91-7678-646-8. "Prior to the passage of the federal acts in the 1960s, the legislative variations permissible historically with respect to women's rights under the American federal system initially led to extremely different rights for women depending upon their state of residence."
- Carano, Paul; Sanchez, Pedro C. (1980). A Complete History of Guam (8th printing ed.). Rutland, Vermont: Charles E. Tuttle Company. ISBN 978-0-8048-0114-0. – via FamilySearch (subscription required)
- Cartagena, Juan (2017). "Chapter 10: Latina/o Voting Rights in New York City". In Baver, Sherrie; Falcón, Angelo; Haslip-Viera, Gabriel (eds.). Latinos in New York: Communities in Transition (Second ed.). Notre Dame, Indiana: University of Notre Dame Press. pp. 216–231. ISBN 978-0-268-10153-4.
- Corder, J. Kevin and Christina Wolbrecht. Counting Women's Ballots: Female Voters from Suffrage through the New Deal (Cambridge UP, 2016). xiv, 316 pp.
- Clark, Truman R. (1975). Puerto Rico and the United States, 1917–1933. Pittsburgh, Pennsylvania: University of Pittsburgh Press. ISBN 978-0-8229-7605-9.
- Cott, Nancy F. The Grounding of Modern Feminism (1987).
- Deloria, Vine Jr.; Lytle, Clifford M. (1983). American Indians, American Justice. Austin: University of Texas Press. ISBN 978-0-292-73834-8.
- Dodd, Lynda G. "Parades, Pickets, and Prison: Alice Paul and the Virtues of Unruly Constitutional Citizenship." Journal of Law and Politics 24 (2008): 339–433. online
- DuBois, Ellen Carol (1978). Feminism and Suffrage: The Emergence of an Independent Women's Movement in America, 1848–1869. Ithaca, NY: Cornell University Press. ISBN 0-8014-8641-6.
- DuBois, Ellen Carol (1998). Woman Suffrage and Women's Rights. New York: New York University Press. ISBN 0-8147-1901-5.
- DuBois, Ellen Carol. (2020). Suffrage: Women's Long Battle for the Vote. New York City: Simon & Schuster. ISBN 978-1-5011-6516-0.
- Dudden, Faye E. (2011). Fighting Chance: The Struggle over Woman Suffrage and Black Suffrage in Reconstruction America. New York: Oxford University Press. ISBN 978-0-19-977263-6.
- Flexner, Eleanor (1959). Century of Struggle. Cambridge, MA: Belknap Press of Harvard University Press. ISBN 978-0674106536.
- Fowler, Robert Booth (1986). Carrie Catt: Feminist Politician. Boston: Northeastern University Press. ISBN 0-930350-86-3.
- Frost-Knappman, Elizabeth and Cullen-DuPont, Kathryn (2009). Women's Suffrage in America. New York: Facts on File. ISBN 0-8160-5693-5.
- Graham, Sara Hunter (1996). Woman Suffrage and the New Democracy. New Haven: Yale University Press. ISBN 0-300-06346-6.
- Ginzberg, Lori D (2009). Elizabeth Cady Stanton: An American Life. Hill and Wang, New York. ISBN 978-0-8090-9493-6.
- Hacker, Meg (Spring 2014). "When Saying "I Do" Meant Giving Up Your U.S. Citizenship" (PDF). Prologue. Washington, D. C.: National Archives and Records Administration: 56–61. ISSN 0033-1031.
- Harper, Ida Husted (1898–1908). The Life and Work of Susan B. Anthony, Vol 1 of 3.; The Life and Work of Susan B. Anthony, Vol. 2 of 3.
- Hewitt, Nancy A. (2001). Women's Activism and Social Change: Rochester, New York, 1822–1872. Lexington Books, Lanham, Maryland. ISBN 0-7391-0297-4.
- Kerber, Linda K. (1998). No Constitutional Right to be Ladies : women and the obligations of citizenship (1st ed.). New York: Hill and Wang. ISBN 0-8090-7383-8.
- Kraditor, Aileen S. The Ideas of the Woman Suffrage Movement, 1890–1920 (1971).
- Lemay, Kate Clarke (2019). Votes for Women! A Portrait of Persistence. Princeton, NJ: Princeton University Press.
- McMillen, Sally Gregory (2008). Seneca Falls and the Origins of the Women's Rights Movement. New York: Oxford University Press. ISBN 0-19-518265-0.
- Million, Joelle. (2003). Woman's Voice, Woman's Place: Lucy Stone and the Birth of the Woman's Rights Movement, Westport, CT: Praeger. ISBN 0-275-97877-X.
- Morra, Linda G. (June 20, 1991). U.S. Insular Areas: Applicability of Relevant Provisions of the U.S. Constitution (PDF) (Report). Washington, D.C.: United States General Accounting Office. Report B-217276. Archived (PDF) from the original on May 6, 2021.
- National Academy of Sciences; National Research Council (2008). State Voter Registration Databases: Immediate Actions and Future Improvements: Interim Report. Washington, D.C.: National Academies Press. ISBN 978-0-309-17858-7.
- Neuman, Johanna. And yet they persisted: how American women won the right to vote (2020) excerpt.
- Podolefsky, Ronnie L. (February 2014). "Illusion of Suffrage: Female Voting Rights and the Women's Poll Tax Repeal Movement after the Nineteenth Amendment". Notre Dame Law Review. 73 (3). Notre Dame, Indiana: University of Notre Dame Law School: 839–888. ISSN 0745-3515.
- Rakow, Lana F. and Kramarae, Cheris, editors (2001). The Revolution in Words: Righting Women 1868–1871, Volume 4 of Women's Source Library. New York: Routledge. ISBN 978-0-415-25689-6.
- Rivera Lassén, Ana Irma (May 2010). "Del dicho al derecho hay un gran trecho o el derecho a tener derechos: decisiones del tribunal supremo de Puerto Rico ante los derechos de las mujeres y de las comunidades LGBTTI" [There Is a Huge Gap from Saying There Are Rights or the Right to Have Rights: Decisions of the Supreme Court of Puerto Rico Regarding the Rights of Women and LGBTTI Communities] (PDF). Revista Jurídica UIPR (in Spanish). 44 (1). San Germán, Puerto Rico: Interamerican University of Puerto Rico: 39–70. ISSN 0041-851X. Archived from the original (PDF) on November 15, 2019.
- Rivera López, Lizbeth L. (2016). Las aportaciones sociales y periodísticas de las mujeres en Puerto Rico: desde la llegada de la imprenta en los primeros años del siglo XIX hasta el primer tercio del siglo XX [The Social and Journalistic Contributions of Women in Puerto Rico: From the Arrival of the Printing Press in the First Years of the 19th Century until the First Third of the 20th Century] (PDF) (PhD). Madrid, Spain: Universidad Complutense de Madrid. Archived from the original (PDF) on November 15, 2019.
- Roy-Féquière, Magali (2004). Women, Creole Identity, and Intellectual Life in Early Twentieth-century Puerto Rico. Philadelphia, Pennsylvania: Temple University Press. ISBN 978-1-59213-231-7.
- Schultz, Jaime (2013). "The Physical is Political: Women's Suffrage, Pilgrim Hikes and the Public Sphere", in Women, Sport, Society: Further Reflections, Reaffirming Mary Wollstonecraft, edited by Roberta J. Park and Patricia Vertinsky. New York: Routledge. ISBN 9781317985808
- Scott, Anne Firor; Scott, Andrew Mackay (1982). One Half the People: The Fight for Woman Suffrage. University of Illinois Press. ISBN 0-252-01005-1.
- Stanton, Elizabeth Cady; Anthony, Susan B.; Gage, Matilda Joslyn; Harper, Ida (1881–1922). History of Woman Suffrage in six volumes. Rochester, NY: Susan B. Anthony (Charles Mann Press).
- Teele, Dawn Langan. Forging the Franchise: The Political Origins of the Women's Vote (2018) Online review
- Terborg-Penn, Rosalyn (1998). "Enfranchising Women of Color: Woman Suffragists as Agents of Imperialism". In Pierson, Ruth Roach; Chaudhuri, Nupur; McAuley, Beth (eds.). Nation, Empire, Colony: Historicizing Gender and Race. Bloomington: Indiana University Press. pp. 41–56. ISBN 0-253-11386-5.
- Terborg-Penn, Rosalyn (1987). "African Feminism: A Theoretical Approach to the History of Women in the African Diaspora". In Terborg-Penn, Rosalyn; Harley, Sharon; Rushing, Andrea Benton (eds.). Women in Africa and the African Diaspora. Washington, D.C.: Howard University Press. pp. 43–63. ISBN 0-88258-171-6.
- Torres Rivera, Juan (2009). "Genara Pagán de Arce". Puerta de Tierra (in Spanish). San Juan, Puerto Rico. Archived from the original on November 15, 2019.
- Valk, Anne; Brown, Leslie (2010). Living with Jim Crow: African American Women and Memories of the Segregated South. New York: Palgrave Macmillan. ISBN 978-0-230-10987-2.
- Van Dyne, Frederick (1904). Citizenship of the United States. Rochester, NY: Lawyers' Co-operative Publishing Companyo. OCLC 1147861787.
- Venet, Wendy Hamand (1991). Neither Ballots nor Bullets: Women Abolitionists and the Civil War. Charlottesville: University Press of Virginia. ISBN 978-0813913421.
- Walton, Mary (2010). A Woman's Crusade: Alice Paul and the Battle for the Ballot New York: Palgrave Macmillan. ISBN 978-0-230-61175-7.
- Ward, Geoffrey C., with essays by Martha Saxton, Ann D. Gordon and Ellen Carol DuBois (1999). Not for Ourselves Alone: The Story of Elizabeth Cady Stanton and Susan B. Anthony. New York: Alfred Knopf. ISBN 0-375-40560-7.
- Wellman, Judith (2004). The Road to Seneca Falls: Elizabeth Cady Stanton and the First Women's Rights Convention, University of Illinois Press. ISBN 0-252-02904-6.
- Wheeler, Marjorie Spruill (1993). New Women of the New South: The Leaders of the Woman Suffrage Movement in the Southern States. New York: Oxford University Press. ISBN 0-19-507583-8.

=== Anti-suffrage ===
- Apostol, Jane. "Why Women Should Not Have the Vote: Anti-Suffrage Views in the Southland in 1911." Southern California Quarterly 70.1 (1988): 29–42. in California online
- Benjamin, Anne M. (1992). A History of the Anti-Suffrage Movement in the United States from 1895 to 1920. Edwin Mellen Press.
- Finneman, Teri. "Covering a countermovement on the verge of defeat: The press and the 1917 social movement against woman suffrage." American Journalism 36.1 (2019): 124–143.
- Goodier, Susan (2013). No Votes for Women: The New York State Anti-Suffrage Movement. University of Illinois Press. ISBN 9780252094675.
- Green, Elna C. (1999). "From Antisuffragism to Anti-Communism: The Conservative Career of Ida M. Darden". Journal of Southern History. 65 (2): 287–316. doi:10.2307/2587365. JSTOR 2587365.
- Jablonsky, Thomas J. (1994). The home, heaven, and mother party: Female anti-suffragists in the United States, 1868–1920. Carlson Pub.
- Kenneally, James J. (1967). Catholicism and Woman Suffrage in Massachusetts. Vol. 8. Catholic Historical Review. pp. 43–57.
- McDonagh, Eileen L., and H. Douglas Price. "Woman suffrage in the Progressive Era: Patterns of opposition and support in referenda voting, 1910-1918." American Political Science Review 79.2 (1985): 415-435 (digital).</ref>
- Maddux, Kristy (2004). When Patriots Protest: The Anti-Suffrage Discursive Transformation of 1917. Vol. 7. Rhetoric and Public Affairs. pp. 283–310.
- Marshall, Susan E. (1997). Splintered Sisterhood: Gender and Class in the Campaign against Woman Suffrage. University of Wisconsin Press.
- McConnaughy, Corrine M. (2013). The Woman Suffrage Movement in America: A Reassessment. New York: Cambridge University Press. ISBN 978-1-107-43396-0.
- Nielsen, Kim E. (2001). Un-American womanhood : antiradicalism, antifeminism, and the first Red Scare. Columbus: Ohio State University Press. ISBN 978-0-8142-0882-3.
- Palczewski, Catherine H. "The male Madonna and the feminine Uncle Sam: Visual argument, icons, and ideographs in 1909 anti-woman suffrage postcards." Quarterly Journal of Speech 91.4 (2005): 365–394. online
- Stevenson, Louise L. (1979). "Women Anti-Suffragists in the 1915 Massachusetts Campaign". New England Quarterly. 52 (1): 80–93. doi:10.2307/364357. JSTOR 364357.
- Thurner, Manuela. (1993). "'Better Citizens Without the Ballot': American AntiSuffrage Women and Their Rationale During the Progressive Era". Journal of Women's History. 5 (1): 33–60. doi:10.1353/jowh.2010.0279. S2CID 144309053.
- Vacca, Carolyn Summers (2004). A reform against nature: woman suffrage and the rethinking of American citizenship, 1840–1920. Peter Lang.

=== Primary sources ===
- DuBois, Ellen Carol, ed. (1992). The Elizabeth Cady Stanton–Susan B. Anthony Reader. Boston: Northwestern University Press. ISBN 1-55553-143-1.
- DuBois, Ellen Carol and Dumenil, Lynn (2009). Through Women's Eyes: An American History with Documents, Vol. 1. Boston: Bedford/St. Martin's. ISBN 978-0-312-46888-0.
- Gordon, Ann D., ed. (1997). The Selected Papers of Elizabeth Cady Stanton and Susan B. Anthony: In the School of Anti-Slavery, 1840 to 1866. Vol. 1 of 6. New Brunswick, NJ: Rutgers University Press. ISBN 0-8135-2317-6.
- Gordon, Ann D., ed. (2000). The Selected Papers of Elizabeth Cady Stanton and Susan B. Anthony: Against an aristocracy of sex, 1866 to 1873. Vol. 2 of 6. New Brunswick, NJ: Rutgers University Press. ISBN 0-8135-2318-4.
- Gordon, Ann D., ed. (2009). The Selected Papers of Elizabeth Cady Stanton and Susan B. Anthony: Place Inside the Body-Politic, 1887 to 1895. Vol. 5 of 6. New Brunswick, NJ: Rutgers University Press. ISBN 978-0-8135-2321-7.
