= List of North Dakota suffragists =

This is a list of North Dakota suffragists, suffrage groups and others associated with the cause of women's suffrage in North Dakota.

== Groups ==
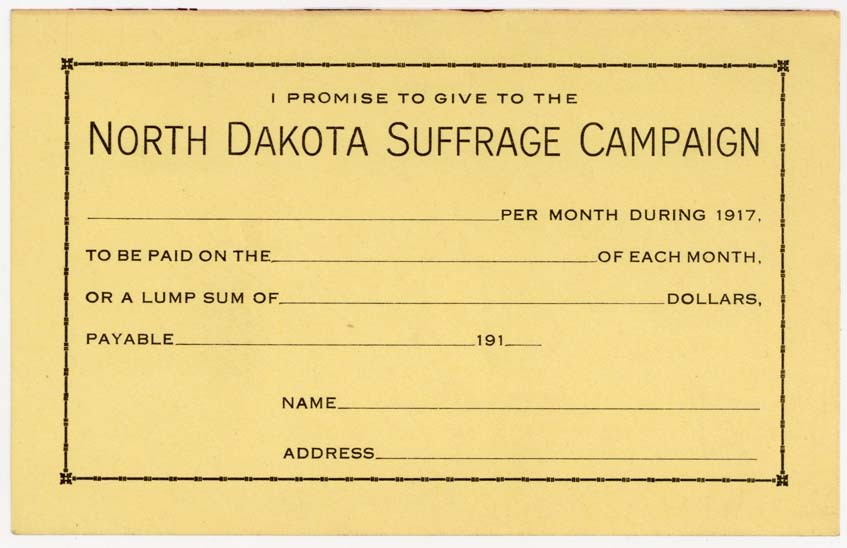
North Dakota Suffrage Campaign, 1917

- Beach Votes for Women League.
- Grand Forks Equal Suffrage Association.
- National Woman's Party.
- Votes for Women Club of Grand Forks, created on March 1, 1912.
- Votes for Women League, created in 1912.
- Woman Suffrage League of Bismarck, created in 1914.
- Woman's Christian Temperance Union.

== Suffragists ==
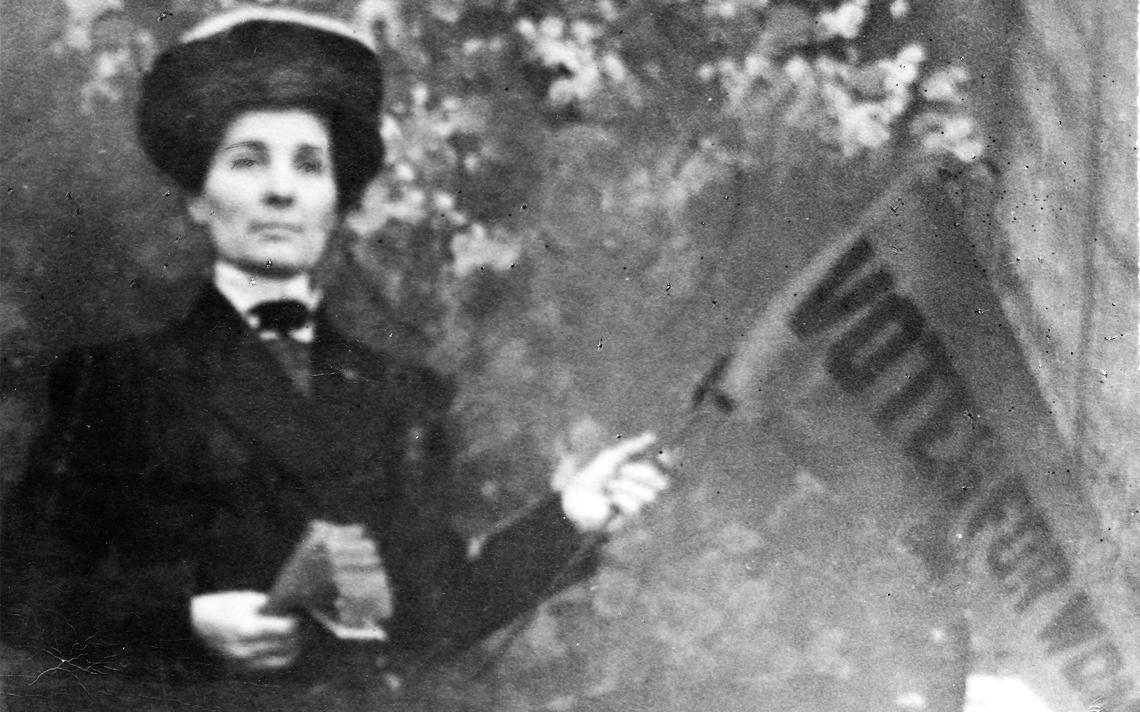
Cornelia Probstfield Gesell

- Beulah Amindon (Fargo).
- Elizabeth Preston Anderson.
- Marie Louise Bottineau Baldwin (Metis/Turtle Mountain Chippewa) (Pembina).
- Helen M. Barker.
- Emma F. Bates (Bismarck, Valley City).
- Grace Clendenning (Wimbledon).
- Louisa A. Conger (Dickinson).
- Guy C. H. Corliss.
- Clara L. Darrow (Fargo).
- Helen deLendrecie (Fargo).
- Cora Smith Eaton (Grand Forks).
- Annie Falger (Devil's Lake).
- Janette Hill Knox (Wahpeton).
- Alma Lutz (Jamestown).
- Emma Murray (Hebron).
- Flora Blackman Naylor (Chautauqua).
- Elizabeth Darrow O'Neil (Fargo).
- Alice Nelson Page (Grand Forks).
- Kate Perkins.
- Alice M. Alt Pickler.
- Christine Pollock (Fargo).
- Helen G. Putnam.
- Fannie D. Quain (Bismarck).
- Linda Slaughter (Bismarck).
- Mazie Stevens (Grand Forks).
- Mary Darrow Weible (Fargo).
- Kate Selby Wilder (Fargo).

=== Politicians supporting women's suffrage ===
- John Cashel.
- Oscar Lindstrom.
- John Pickler.
- Robert M. Pollock.
- Enos Stutsman.

== Suffragists campaigning in North Dakota ==
- Henry Browne Blackwell.
- Lillie Devereux Blake.
- Carrie Chapman Catt.
- Emma Smith DeVoe.
- Susan S. Fessenden.
- Ella M. S. Marble.
- Helen Guthrie Miller.
- Sylvia Pankhurst.
- Anna Howard Shaw.

== Anti-suffragists in North Dakota ==
Groups

- North Dakota Association Opposed to Woman Suffrage, organized in Fargo in 1914.
- Personal Liberty League of the German American Alliance.

People

- Ida Clarke Young.

== See also ==
- Timeline of women's suffrage in North Dakota
- Women's suffrage in North Dakota
- Women's suffrage in states of the United States
- Women's suffrage in the United States
