= Women's suffrage in North Dakota =

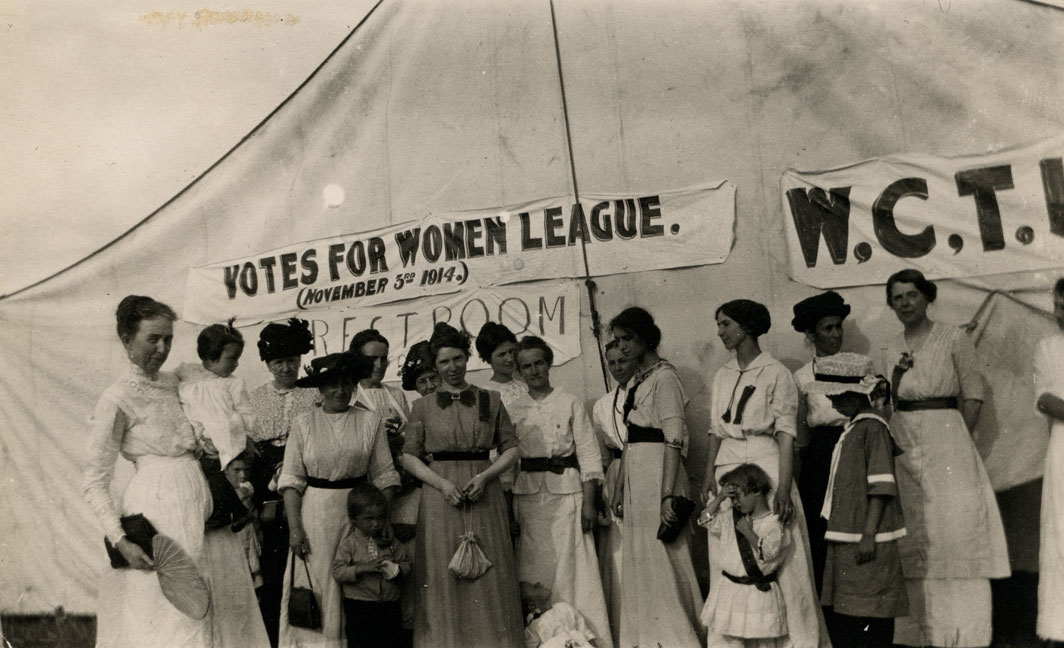
Votes for Women League's tent at the 1914 Bottineau County Fair.

Women's suffrage began in North Dakota when it was still part of the Dakota Territory. During this time activists worked for women's suffrage, and in 1879, women gained the right to vote at school meetings. This was formalized in 1883 when the legislature passed a law where women would use separate ballots for their votes on school-related issues. When North Dakota was writing its state constitution, efforts were made to include equal suffrage for women, but women were only able to retain their right to vote for school issues. An abortive effort to provide equal suffrage happened in 1893, when the state legislature passed equal suffrage for women. However, the bill was "lost," never signed and eventually expunged from the record. Suffragists continued to hold conventions, raise awareness, and form organizations. The arrival of Sylvia Pankhurst in February 1912 stimulated the creation of more groups, including the statewide Votes for Women League. In 1914, there was a voter referendum on women's suffrage, but it did not pass. In 1917, limited suffrage bills for municipal and presidential suffrage were signed into law. On December 1, 1919, North Dakota became the twentieth state to ratify the Nineteenth Amendment.

== Territorial Dakota ==
Women's suffrage in North Dakota started when it was part of the Dakota Territory. One of the earliest efforts to grant women full suffrage in the territory was proposed in the Territorial House by Enos Stutsman in 1868. Stutsman's bill passed the house but did not pass in the full legislative session. In 1872 another full women's suffrage bill nearly passed the Territorial Legislature, only failing by one vote in 1872.

Women were allowed to vote in school meetings in Dakota Territory starting in 1879. In 1883, changes made to the law specified that women would use separate ballots to vote for school issues. This caused a disruption for women voters in some areas of the territory, but was mostly a breakthrough because it also gave women the right to run for school-related offices. The American Woman Suffrage Association (AWSA) held a convention in Minneapolis in October 1885 where many Dakota suffragists attended. The first women's suffrage club in the territory was formed in Webster shortly after the convention.

During the next territorial legislative session in 1885, John Pickler introduced a full women's suffrage bill in the House. The bill passed both the House and the Territorial Council, but was vetoed by Governor Gilbert A. Pierce. In the next session in 1887, a bill expanding the ability of women to vote in school elections was passed. Also that year, the franchise department of the Woman's Christian Temperance Union (WCTU), made up of Helen M. Barker, Alice M. Alt Pickler, and S. V. Wilson presented petitions for full women's suffrage to the territorial legislature. Lawmakers considered a full equal suffrage bill, but it did not pass.

When the Dakota Territory was admitted as two states to the United States in 1889, two distinct suffrage movements emerged. As the constitutional convention for North Dakota met in Bismarck in July, 1889, Henry Browne Blackwell traveled to support women's suffrage in the new state. H. F. Miller introduced a clause to extend suffrage to all citizens "without regard to sex." Blackwell spoke at public meetings involving the new constitution and was invited to speak to the delegates. Blackwell could not stay through the entire convention and Cora Smith Eaton, secretary of the Grand Forks Suffrage Club, continued his efforts. Eaton was provided a room on the same floor as the Convention Hall and she and other activists lobbied delegates who had not made a decision on women's suffrage. Eventually it was decided that only men would have full suffrage. The new state constitution did provide women the right to vote for all school offices and any issue that related to school issues.

== Continuing efforts ==
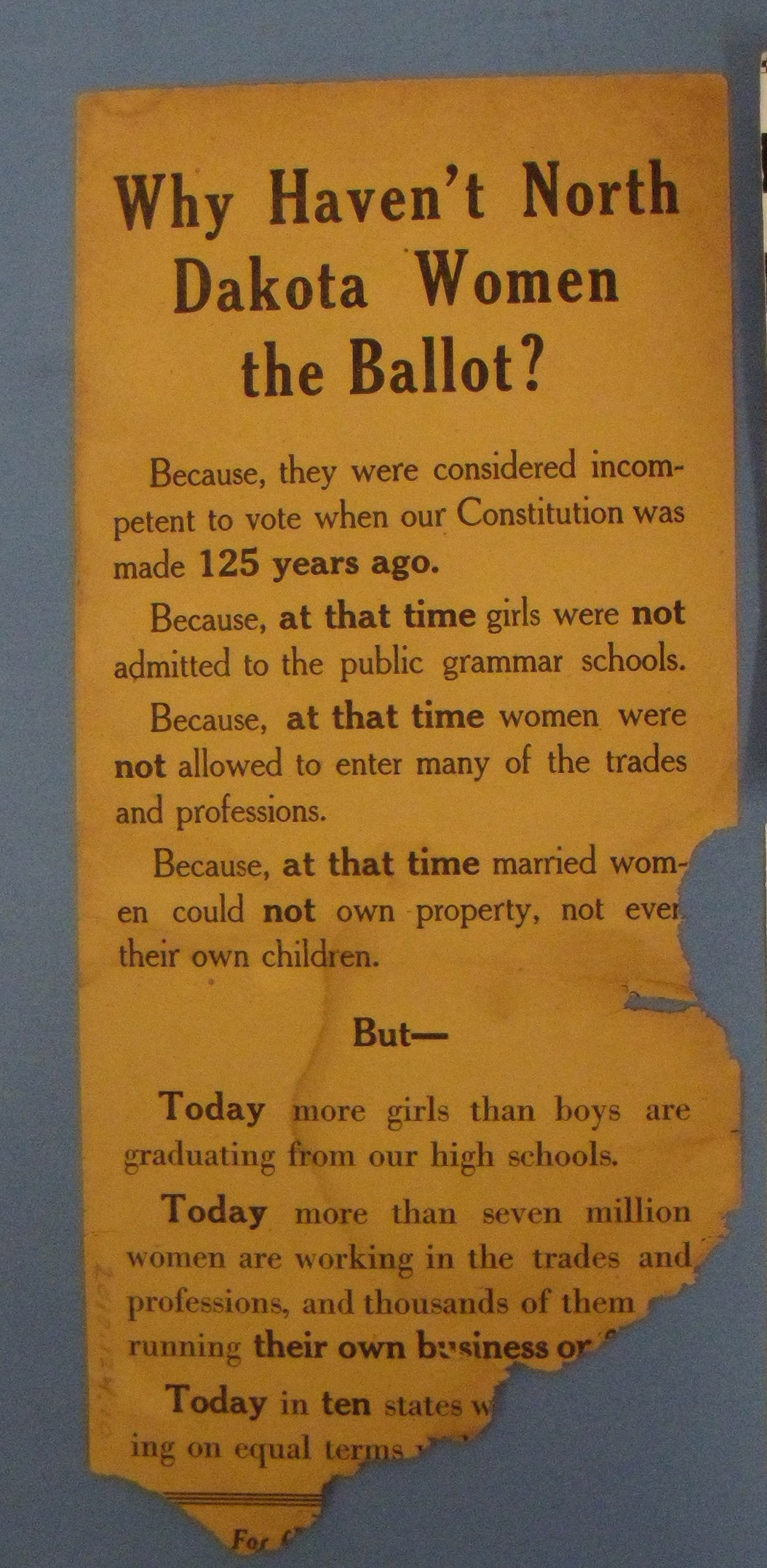
Women's suffrage flier passed out in Bismarck

Elizabeth Preston Anderson became president of the Dakota WCTU in 1893 and believed that in order to work towards prohibition laws, women needed the right to vote. Members of the WCTU who were interested in women's suffrage wore white ribbons to show their support. Anderson was invited to speak to the state legislature on a resolution for a women's suffrage amendment in 1893. This bill passed both houses, but was "lost" on the way to the governor's officer. After that happened, the legislature voted to expunge the record of the passage.

The first state suffrage convention was held in Grand Forks in 1895. In July 1901, the Equal Suffrage Association of North Dakota held its annual convention in Devil's Lake. Activists at the convention highlighted the idea, "Taxation Without Representation is Tyranny." From 1901 to 1911, every session of the state legislature submitted a women's suffrage bill for consideration.

In the 1910s, more women's suffrage work emerged in the state. On February 4, 1912, suffragists were invited to meet Sylvia Pankhurst at the home of Mary Darrow Weible in Fargo. Pankhurst gave a speech in the Grand Theatre where there was so much interest, that there was standing room only. She also encouraged suffragists in North Dakota to form suffrage groups. In June 1912, activists created a statewide Votes for Women League. Helen deLendrecie donated the space for their headquarters in the deLendrecie Building where they remained from 1912 and 1918. The first president was Weible and the organization was meant to affiliate with the National American Woman Suffrage Association (NAWSA). The first convention of the Votes for Women League took place in the Civic Center in Fargo on October 18, 1913. The organization came up with a plan to divide the state into judicial districts with activists representing the suffrage work in each district. This plan was carried out partially and around 100 leagues were formed with a total of around 2,000 members.

In 1913, the Cashel bill to amend the state constitution for women's suffrage passed, though would have to pass again in the next legislative session. Also in 1913, the state legislature passed a bill, the Bronson bill, for women's suffrage to go to a voter referendum on November 4, 1914. The wording of the state constitution meant that the bill would pass only if the majority of the votes cast at that election were "yes" votes. Ballots turned in with no mark at all for the referendum would be counted as negative. Ida Husted Harper wrote, "It was generally conceded that if the unmarked ballots had not been counted against the measure it would have been carried." In 1915, the Cashel bill did not pass for the second time, meaning the state suffrage amendment failed.

== Road to ratification ==
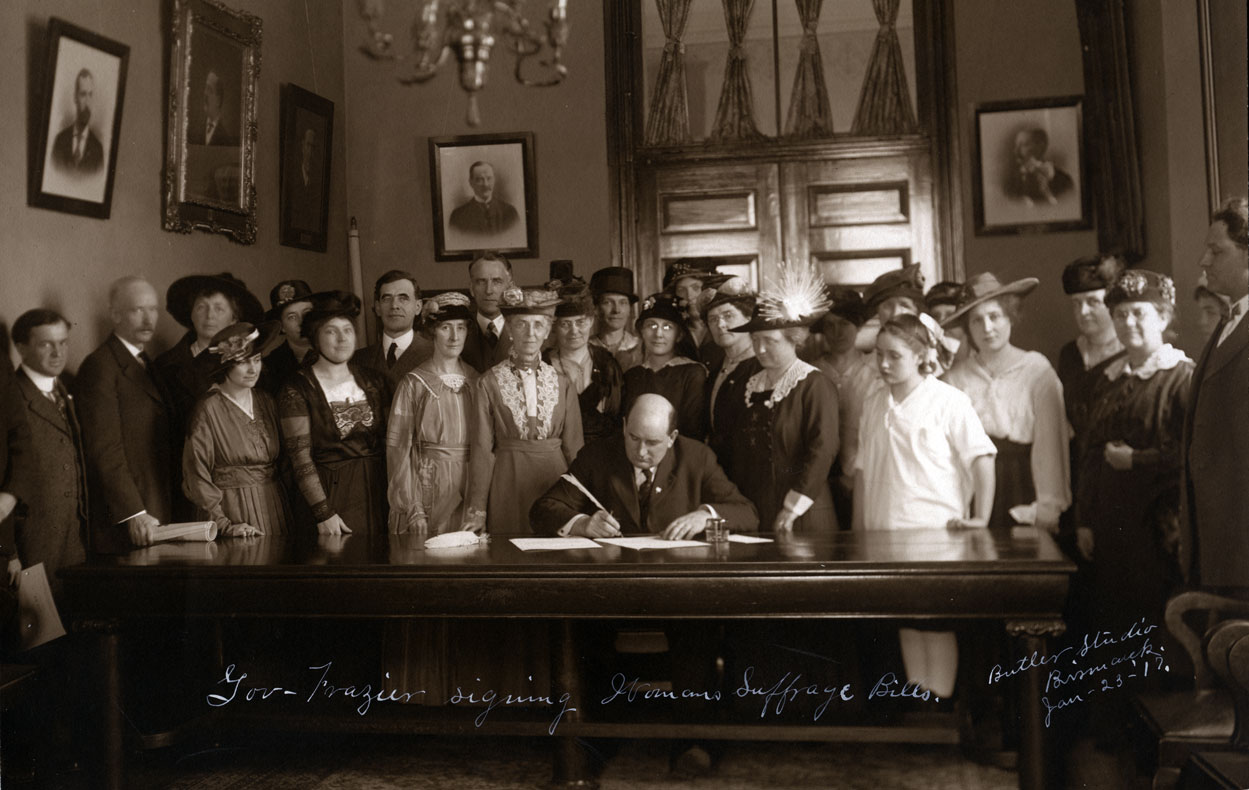
Governor Lynn Frazier signs the 1917 North Dakota suffrage bill.

In January 1917, Senator Oscar Lindstrom introduced a presidential and municipal suffrage bill drafted by Robert M. Pollock in the state legislature. At the same time another bill for an amendment to the state constitution to provide equal women's suffrage was also introduced. Both bills passed and were signed into law on January 23. The limited suffrage bill gave women the right to vote in presidential elections and all other elections where the state constitution did not specifically prohibit.

Suffragists in North Dakota also joined the National Woman's Party (NWP) demonstrations in front of the White House. Member of the NWP North Dakota executive committee, Mary Darrow Weible, was one of the protestors. Beulah Amidon of Fargo also picketed the White House and was arrested on August 15, 1917 for demonstrating. Amidon had the nickname of "The Prettiest Picket."

After June 1919, Alice Paul asked Governor Lynn Frazier to hold a special legislative session to ratify the Nineteenth Amendment. Frazier delayed until he had other issues to consider, convening a session on November 26, 1919. The amendment was ratified on December 1, 1919, making North Dakota the 20th state to ratify. Most women voted with equal rights in the November 2020 election.

== Native American women ==
Marie Louise Bottineau Baldwin (Métis Turtle Mountain Band of Chippewa Indians) was a Native American suffragist from North Dakota. Baldwin marched in the 1913 Woman Suffrage Procession where she walked with other women lawyers.

Native American women had a longer path to full voting rights in North Dakota. In June 1924, the Indian Citizenship Act was passed, which should have allowed all Native American women to vote in the state. However, it wasn't until 1958 that Native American women who did not denounce their tribal affiliations could vote in the state.

== Anti-suffragism in North Dakota ==
The Personal Liberty League of the German American Alliance opposed women's suffrage in North Dakota. In 1914, the North Dakota Association Opposed to Woman Suffrage was founded in Fargo with Ida Clark Young leading the group.

== See also ==
- List of North Dakota suffragists
- Timeline of women's suffrage in North Dakota
- Women's suffrage in states of the United States
- Women's suffrage in the United States
