= Timeline of women's suffrage in North Dakota =

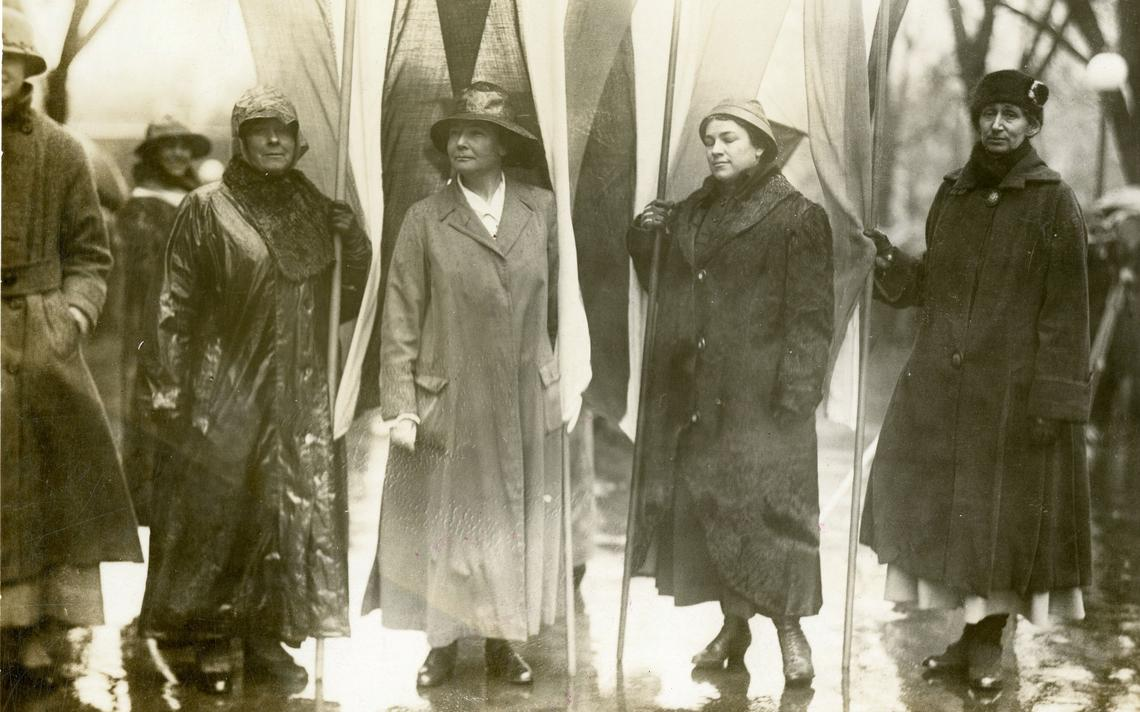
Mary Darrow Weible protests with NWP pre 1920

This is a timeline of women's suffrage in North Dakota. Women's suffrage in North Dakota began while it was still part of the Dakota Territory. In 1879, women in the territory gained the right to vote in school meetings. Later, this was more formalized in 1883, providing women separate ballots for school issues. After North Dakota was a state, suffragists continued to work for full suffrage. A referendum on equal suffrage took place in 1914, but failed. In 1917, women gained the right to vote in municipal and presidential elections. On December 1, 1919, North Dakota became the 20th state to ratify the Nineteenth Amendment.

== 19th century ==
=== 1860s ===
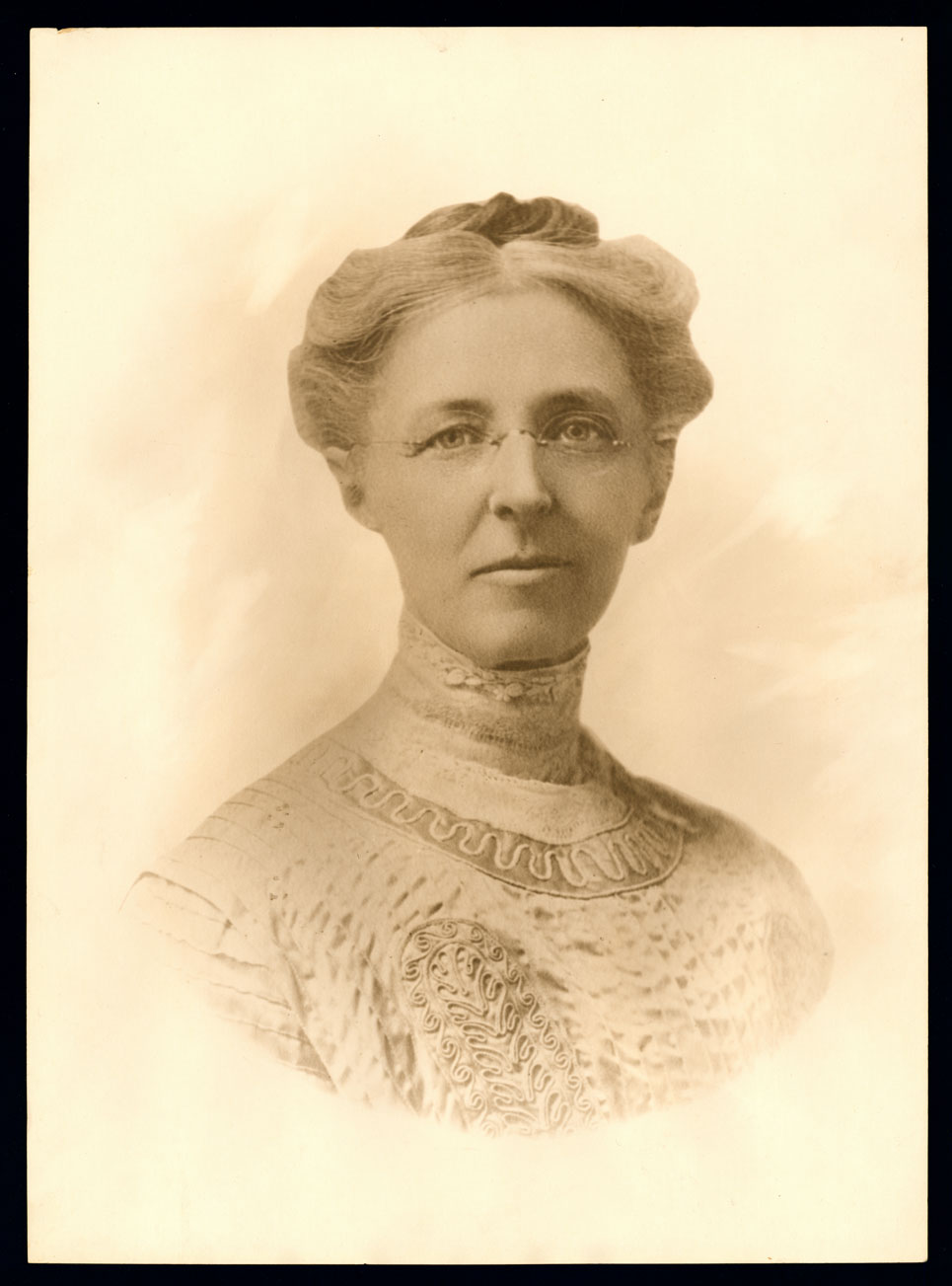
Elizabeth Preston Anderson

1868

- Enos Stutsman proposes a women's suffrage bill in the Dakota Territorial House.

=== 1870s ===
1872

- The Territorial Legislature nearly passes a full women's suffrage bill, losing by one vote.

1879

- The Dakota Territory gives women the right to vote in school meetings.

1883

- A change in the way people would vote on school issues disenfranchised many women voters in the territory. The Territory wanted women to use separate ballots for school issues.

1885

- John Pickler proposes a women's suffrage bill in the Territorial House, which passed. It is vetoed by Governor Gilbert A. Pierce.

1887

- A school suffrage bill expanding the rights of women to vote for all kinds of school issues passes.
- A full women's suffrage bill is proposed, but does not pass the territorial legislature.

1888

- A call for a women's suffrage group was put out in Grand Forks. On April 12, a meeting was held to form a women's suffrage group that had a packed crowd.

1889

- After the Dakota territory is admitted as two states, two distinct women's suffrage movements emerge.

=== 1890s ===
1890

- August 4: In a special election, Sara E. B. Smith and Cora Smith Eaton both voted and their votes were considered valid.

1893

- March 3: Elizabeth Preston Anderson speaks at the territorial legislature.
- A bill was proposed to allow all taxpayers equal suffrage, but did not pass.

1895

- November 14–15: The first state suffrage convention is held in Grand Forks.
- A women's suffrage bill was proposed in the state legislature, but did not pass.

1897

- November 30: The second state women's suffrage convention is held in Fargo.

1898

- September 27–28: The third state women's suffrage convention is held in Larimore.

1899

- September 26–27: The fourth state women's suffrage convention is held in Hillsboro.

== 20th century ==
=== 1900s ===
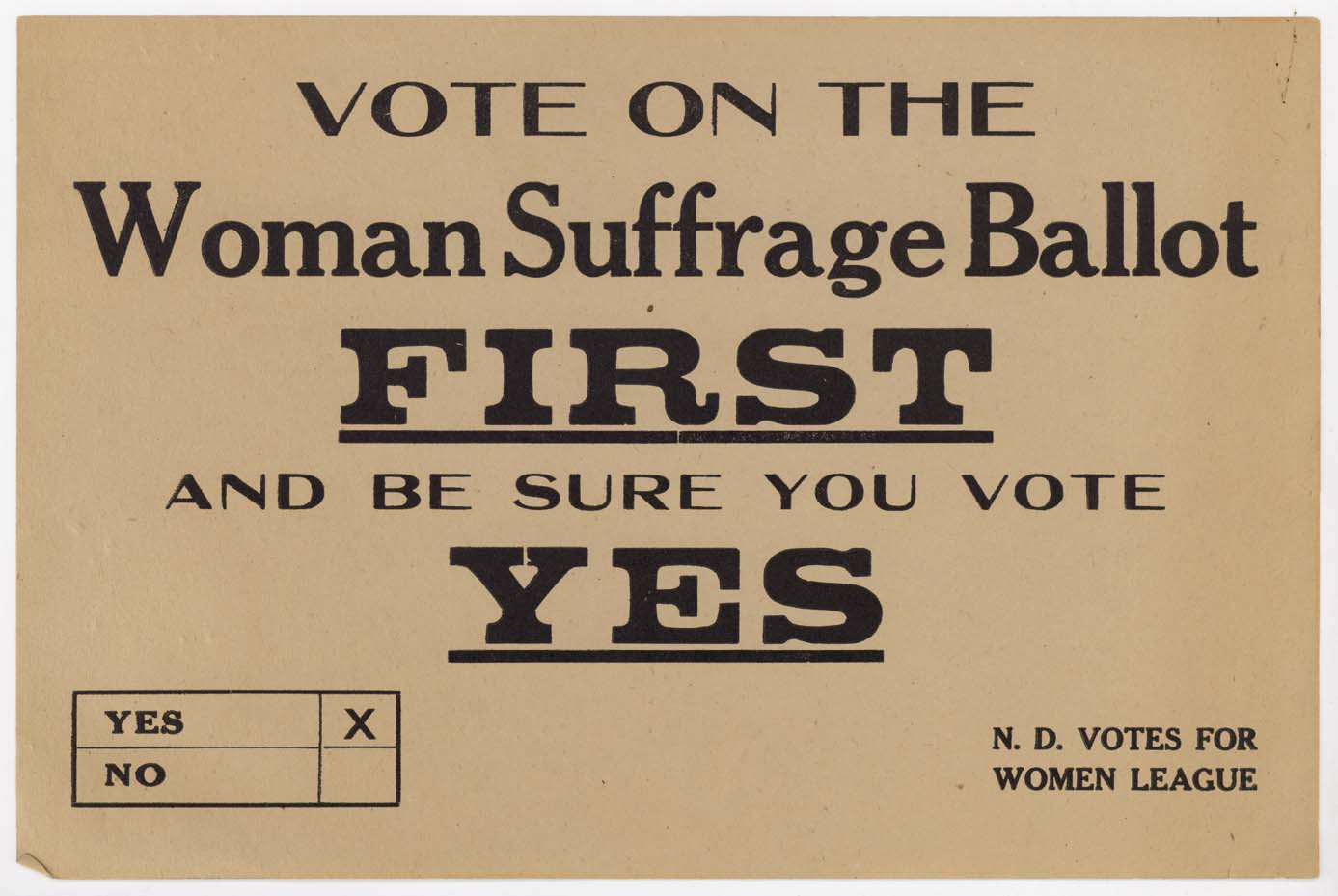
Sample women's suffrage ballot, North Dakota

1900

- September 25–26: The fifth state suffrage convention is held in Lakota.

1901

- July 17: The Equal Suffrage Association of North Dakota holds its annual convention in Devil's Lake.

=== 1910s ===
1912

- February 4: Sylvia Pankhurst meets with suffragists at Mary Darrow Weible's home.
- June 13: A state Votes for Women League is created.

1913

- An amendment to the state constitution, the Cashel suffrage bill, is passed in the state legislature and must pass again in the next session to be approved.
- October 18: The first Votes for Women convention is held in Fargo.

1914

- The Woman Suffrage League of Bismarck is formed in 1914.
- The North Dakota Association Opposed to Woman Suffrage is created in Fargo.
- November 4: Vote for the women's suffrage bill takes place. It does not pass.

1915

- The Cashel suffrage bill does not pass a second time and fails.
- June: State women's suffrage convention is held in Valley City.
- October 10: State women's suffrage convention is held in Minot.

1916

- October 13: State women's suffrage convention is held in Valley City.

1917

- January 14: Senator Oscar Lindstrom introduced a Presidential and Municipal suffrage bill in the state legislature. A bill to for a constitutional amendment for full suffrage to women in North Dakota was also introduced. Both passed.
- January 23: Governor Lynn Frazier signs the presidential and municipal suffrage bill into law and also signs the law about the amendment to the state constitution.
- September 25–26: State women's suffrage convention is held in Bismarck.

1919

- December 1: North Dakota is the 20th state to ratify the Nineteenth Amendment.

=== 1920 ===
1920

- November: Most women are able to exercise their full rights to vote.

1924

- The Indian Citizenship Act is passed, which should allow Native American women to vote.

=== 1950s ===
1958

- The state constitution no longer contains a provision that would only allow Native Americans to vote as long as they renounce their tribal affiliation two years before the election day.

== See also ==
- List of North Dakota suffragists
- Women's suffrage in North Dakota
- Women's suffrage in states of the United States
- Women's suffrage in the United States
