= Nena Jolidon Croake =

American politician (1865–1934)

Dr. Nena Jolidon-Croake
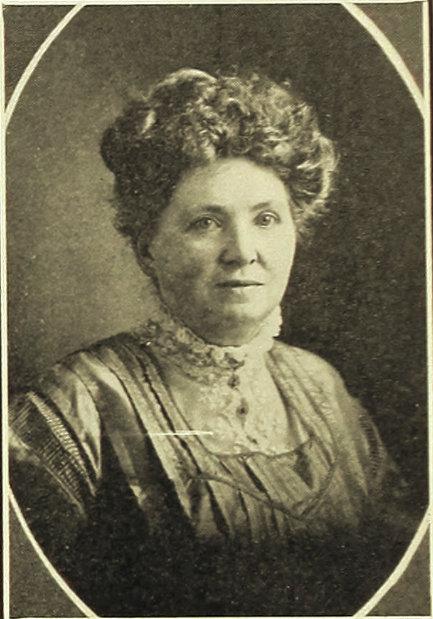

Member of the Washington House of Representatives from the 37th district
- In office 1913–1915

Personal details
- Born: 1865
- Died: 1934 (aged 68–69) Los Angeles
- Party: Progressive
- Spouse: John B. Croake

Nena (Note: Sometimes spelled Nina.) Jolidon-Croake (1865–1934) was an American politician and one of the first two women elected to the Washington State Legislature, representing the 37th Legislative District from Tacoma, Washington. Croake trained as a physician before entering the political sphere, and was also one of the first female physician doctors to practice in Pierce County. While simultaneously being involved with several other social clubs, Croake combined her medical background with a strong commitment to social reform.

Croake was a prominent figure in the women's suffrage movement in Washington, serving in leadership roles within the Washington Equal Suffrage Association and working closely with fellow suffrage leader Emma Smith DeVoe. She was actively involved in the successful 1910 campaign that secured voting rights for women in the state.

During her time in the legislature, Croake centered her focus on welfare and women reforms, like the "Mother's pension system" , which provided financial support to widowed and single mothers. Her political career reflected broader Progressive Era efforts to expand government responsibility for public health, child welfare, and economic security, as well as pioneering the space for women in both Washington State and American politics.

== Early life and career ==
Born in 1865 Illinois, Croake was the daughter of French immigrant, Francis Jolidon, and mother, Dorcas Thompson. Jolidon. Little documentation survives regarding her childhood, early education, or even medical training. What is known, however, is that she pursued a medical career in osteopathic medicine, during a time uncommon for women. Croake constantly broke the "glass ceiling", paving the way for women in many male dominated medical and political fields of the early 20th century.

Jolidon-Croake worked as a physician. She is regarded as one of the first female physicians in all of Pierce County. In 1890, she relocated to Tacoma, Washington, where she was then able to join several social organizations, in a town rich with new opportunities and rapid growth. She served as President of the Washington Equal Suffrage Society and supported the 1910 amendment which gave women the right to vote in Washington.

Sometime later that year, she married deputy Sheriff, John B. Croake, in Victoria, British Columbia, Canada.

Throughout the 1890s, Croake became more active in social clubs and soon transitioned to the political scene, establishing the Tacoma Women's Study Club in 1899. Serving as the president for 3 year, allowed het to focus on important issues, regarding women's rights. Ultimately leading to her involvement with the Washington Equal Suffrage Association, where she also served as president. It was through this organization where she was able to work closely with other prominent suffrage leaders, include another Tacoma based activist Emma Smith DeVoe ( 1848–1927). During her time, she assisted in organizing, advocating, and supporting women's right to vote in Washington state. In 1910, her efforts, were soon reflected, as the legislature allowed for women to vote in Washington State.

== Political career ==
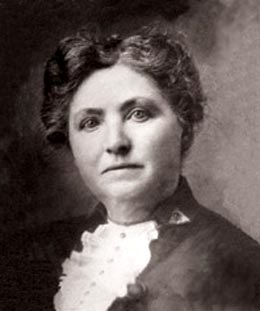
Portrait of Nena Jolidon Croake

Jolidon-Croake ran for office in 1913 after passage of Washington's Fifth Amendment, providing women the right to vote. Her early experiences in Washington state legislature were marked with hostility because of her gender. Once instance is noted, of her mistakenly seconded the voting for the nomination of Thomas Corkery, a fellow progressive, when in fact she meant to vote for Howard Taylor. When corrected, she was reportedly mocked by onlookers, highlighting the unwelcoming environment faced by women entering politics at the time.

Her first bill sought to improve women's working conditions.

During her time in office, she became particularly associated with social welfare legislation, eventually introducing the idea of the "Mother's Pension Bill" This measure was designed to provide financial assistance to widowed and single mother trying to raise children without adequate means of support. Under the bill, qualifying mother were eligible to receive $15 per month, an amount equivalent to more than $300 today.

== Bibliography ==
Dougherty, Phil. “Croake, Nena Jolidon (1865-1934).” Historylink.org, 24 Nov. 2010, www.historylink.org/File/9638

"Legacy Washington - WA Secretary of State". www.sos.wa.gov. SHE FIGHTS FOR MOTHERS.: WOMAN ENTERS POLITICS IN WASHINGTON TO GAIN PENSIONS FOR THEM. (1912, Oct 11). New York Times (1857-1922). Retrieved from https://www.proquest.com/newspapers/she-fights-mothers/docview/97277911/se-2

“Croake, Dr. Nena Jolidon.” Her Hat Was in the Ring, 2026, herhat.historyit.com/items/view/project/1404/search. Accessed 12 Feb. 2026.
