= Judson King =

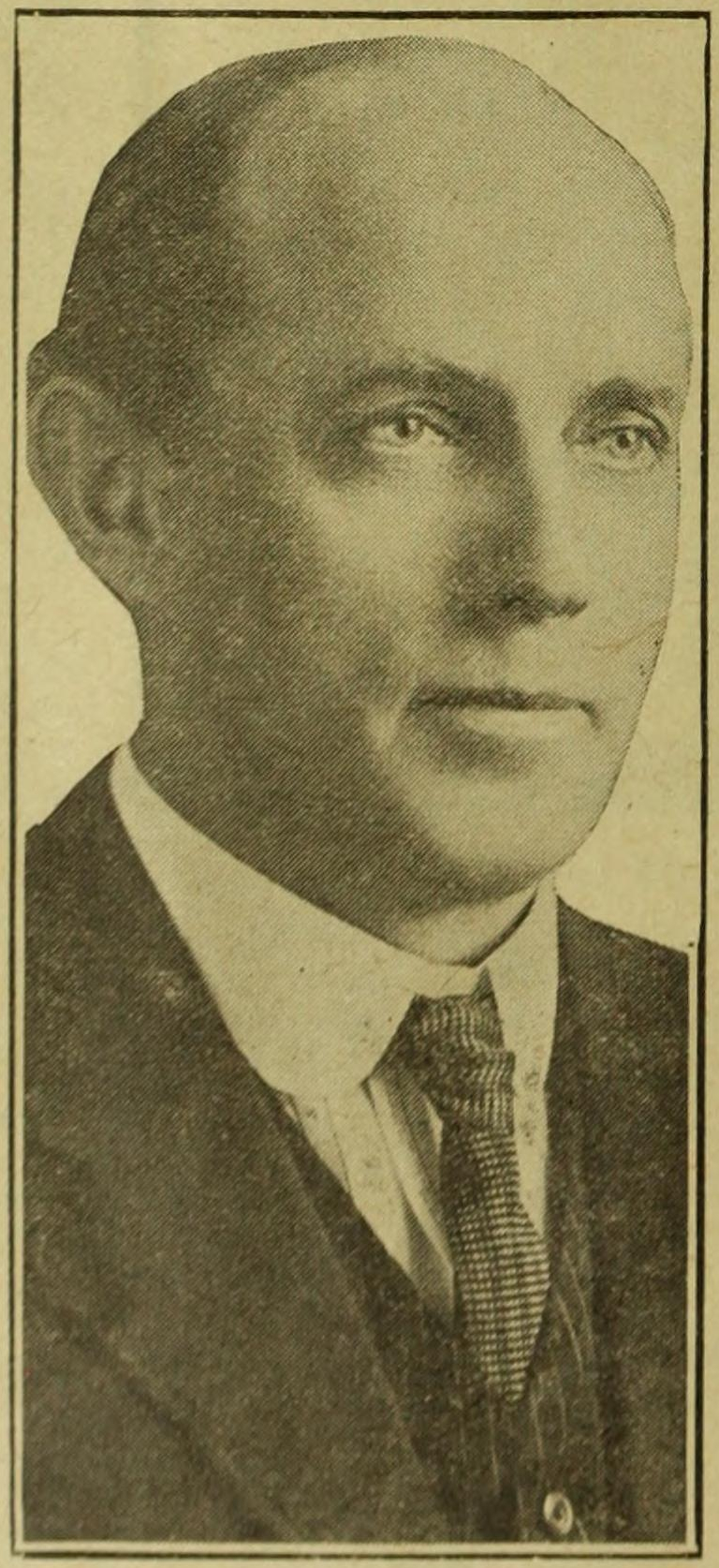
King c. 1922

Judd King (1872–1958) was a 20th-century American historical lecturer, writer, and political consultant at the University of Michigan, Ann Arbor, best known for serving as director of the National Popular Government League (1933–1958).

== Background ==
King was born on April 19, 1872, in Waterford, Pennsylvania. From 1889 to 1893 he attended Battle Creek College and then attended the University of Michigan, graduating in 1896.

== Career ==
In 1902, King founded and edited the Morning Sun in Denison, Texas. In 1905, he served for a year as editor of the Independent Voter in Toledo, Ohio.

In 1908 to 1910, King served as Field Secretary of the Ohio Direct Legislation League.

In 1913 to 1958, he served as Director of the National Popular Government League (NPGL). In May 1920, NGPL published a 67-page Report upon the Illegal Practices of the United States Department of Justice; most of the writing was done by Swinburne Hale of the radical law firm Hale, Nelles & Shorr.

In 1935 to 1944, he worked concurrently as a special consultant to the Rural Electrification Administration.

== Personal life ==
In 1912, King married the suffragist Dr. Cora Smith Eaton. In 1926, he married Bertha Hale White, the former Executive Secretary of the Socialist Party of America.

== Death and legacy ==
He died on July 4, 1958, in Washington, D.C.

White donated his papers for the Library of Congress.

== See also ==
- Cora Smith Eaton
- Bertha Hale White
- Swinburne Hale
