= Women's suffrage movement in Washington =

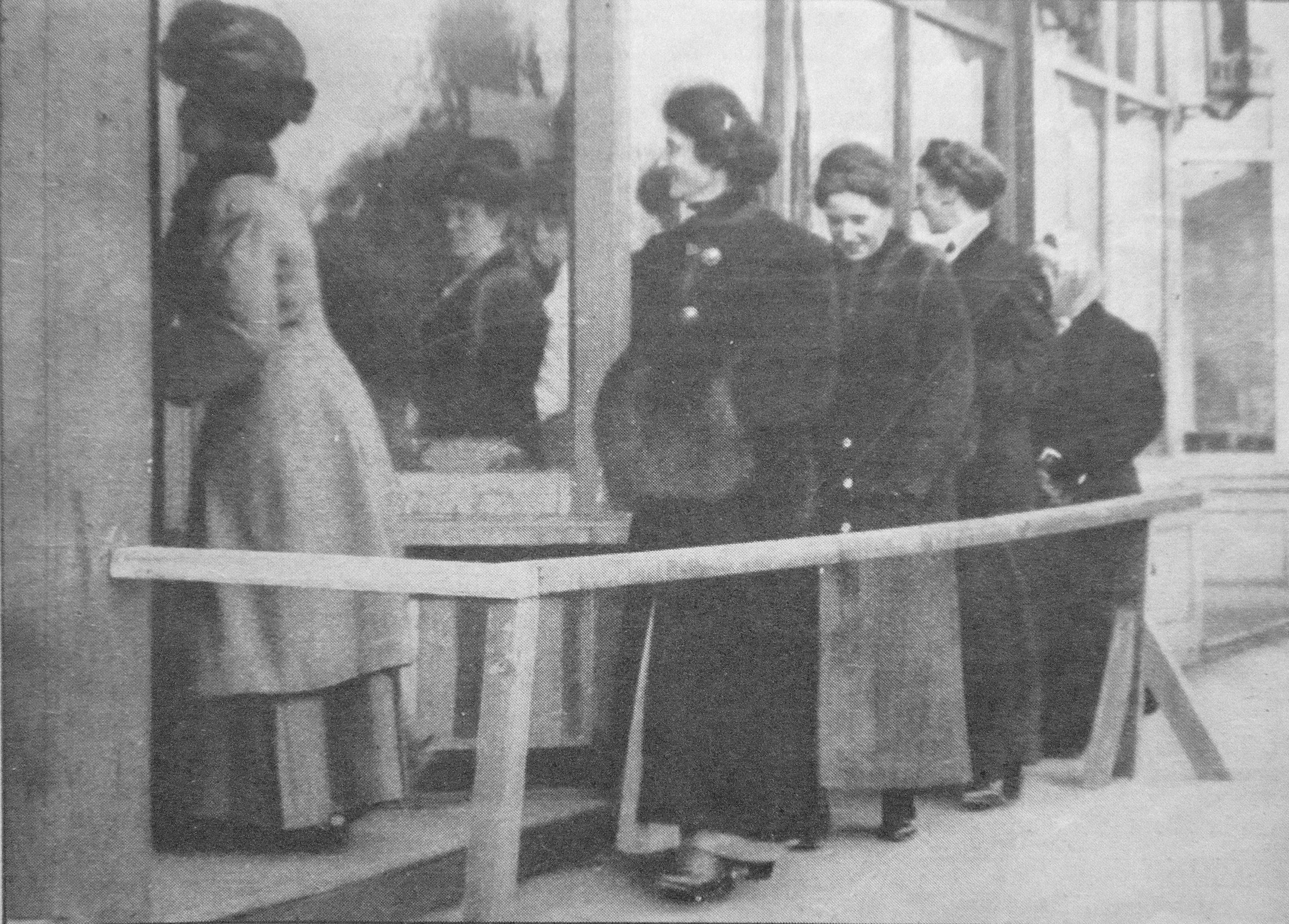
Women voting, Seattle, 1911

The women's suffrage movement in Washington was part of the broader Women's suffrage movement in the United States. In the state of Washington, women gained and lost the right to vote repeatedly in the late 19th and early 20th centuries.

== Beginnings of the movement ==
In 1853, Catharine Paine Blaine moved to Seattle with the minister David Blaine. She had signed the Declaration of Sentiments in the 1848 Seneca Falls Convention and was politically active for the women's rights and temperance movements. She opened Seattle's first community school and encouraged girls to attend: its first class included 13 girls of its 14 students.

The first champion of women's suffrage in Washington Territory was Arthur A. Denny. The Blaines stayed with the Dennys when they first moved to Seattle. Denny introduced a bill to the lower house of the territory in 1854 that would "allow all white females over the age of 18 years to vote", but it lost 8 to 9. Instead, the territory restricted voting to "all white male inhabitants of twenty-one years, of three months' residence, provided they are citizens of the United States, or have declared their intentions to become such", as well as assimilated, mixed Native American men.

=== 1866 question of voting ===
After the loss, the subject went silent for 12 years, until 1866 when the election code used language that could allow for women to vote, because it simply stated that "all white citizens" could vote, Edward Eldridge stood on the house floor and stated that this interpretation included women. For a while many agreed with Eldridge's statement until Mary Olney Brown attempted to cast her vote in Olympia in 1869 and was turned away and told she was not a citizen, in 1870 she tried again and was again denied. At the same time that she was trying to cast her ballot, her sister, Charlotte Olney French and seven other women in Grand Mound, Washington cast their ballots successfully.

In 1869, Washington Territory's first community property law was passed, giving equal property ownership to husbands and wives who bought property after they had married. This gave women more legal rights, thus helping the suffrage movement later.

=== Susan B. Anthony's tour of Washington ===
Prominent national suffragist Susan B. Anthony visited the Washington Territory (later Washington state) to campaign for women's suffrage between October 16 and November 10, 1871. On October 17, she gave a speech to the legislature on “The Power of the Ballot” at Olympic Hall in Olympia. She asked that the legislature pass an act requiring that women's votes be counted during elections. On October 20 the state government voted on the act, but it failed with 13 votes against and 11 in favor.

Anthony went on to speak at Tumwater, Whidbey Island, Port Townsend, and Seattle, then returned to Olympia November 8 to participate in Washington's first women's suffrage convention and helped draft the constitution for the Washington Territory Woman Suffrage Association (WTWSA). Women organized and lobbied heavily for suffrage throughout 1871, prompting the state government to react with an anti-suffrage law, saying "hereafter, no female shall have the right of ballot...until the Congress of the United States of America shall, by direct legislation, declare the same to be the supreme law of the land". There was one exception: women were allowed to vote in school district elections beginning in 1871. From 1877 they were also allowed to vote for school board directors.

When Washington attempted to build support for statehood by holding an 1878 constitutional convention in Walla Walla, suffragists attempted to undo the effects of the 1871 law, pushing for women's right to vote to be included in the new state constitution. Abigail Scott Duniway, an Oregon suffragist who had invited Anthony to tour the territories, spoke at the convention to the delegates, and Mary Olney Brown and other suffragists lobbied there as well. However, the clause was not added, and the constitution was later rejected by Congress when they decided to keep Washington a territory.

== Gaining and losing suffrage in Washington Territory ==
The temperance movement grew popular in Washington, as elsewhere, and helped fuel the women's suffrage movement by casting women as moral voters that would protect their families by voting against issues like slavery, prostitution, gambling, and alcohol. The Women's Christian Temperance Union arrived in Washington in 1883 and grew large within a year. Duniway worried that the movement could hurt the cause of women's suffrage by turning men against the movement, but lawmakers representing farmers from Eastern Washington voted in favor of women's suffrage that year.

Washington became the third territory (after Wyoming and Utah) to approve suffrage in 1883, and for a short time women used their ballots to support temperance and other moral causes. In 1884, women voted at higher rates than men, and cast a quarter of the election's votes. By one estimate, 4/5 of all the territory's women voted in a following election.

=== Court decisions against women's right to vote ===
The powerful saloon lobby pressured the courts, which in an 1887 decision found the suffrage law unconstitutional. They declared that the law granting women suffrage was not named descriptively enough, and struck down women's voting rights in Harland v. Washington. Harry Morgan of Tacoma was a saloon owner who wanted to make sure that women had no vote, because he feared what they would do for his type of business. He was the backer of the case which was the first to officially deny women the right to vote. George Turner was a powerful voice in this case, because he argued that women should not be allowed on a jury, and that suffrage allowed them to do so, and that they needed to reverse women's suffrage to keep them off the jury.

Another case that kept the right to vote from Washington from was the Nevada Bloomer case. Nevada Bloomer was the wife of a Spokane saloon owner, who cared little about women's suffrage, but was a very dutiful wife. Her husband along with some local judges, devised a plan in which they would send Nevada to vote and then turn her away so that she could bring her case to the supreme court. The movement would do a lot to support the Bloomer case, although Nevada never had any intention of actually pursuing real action; the case was simply a diversion to keep the issue tied up in the courts and stop women from voting for prohibition.

The legislature tried to reinstate women's voting rights on January 16, 1888, although this time they did not restore women's right to serve on juries. A political argument used at the time was that women should not be exposed to the "sordid facts of life" heard via jury trials. However, the territory's Supreme Court again struck down this law on November 14, 1888, claiming the U.S. Congress had not intended to let women vote.

=== Suffragist political defeats ===
A new measure giving women the vote was defeated along with prohibition when statehood was attained in 1889.

At the 1893 Chicago Columbian Expedition, Washington had a display that would include its state flower. The state decided that only women could vote for the state flower, and many participated in the campaign, eventually selecting the rhododendron with 7,704 votes.

In 1898, suffragists again campaigned to restore women's right to vote in Washington, but were not able to pass the law again. Many suffragists considered their political ties to the temperance movement and the powerful saloon lobby in Washington to be the causes of their recent losses. Demoralized, many suffragist organizations dissolved, and women's political organizing largely shifted to women's clubs.

== Achieving suffrage ==
The National American Woman Suffrage Association (NAWSA) held a convention in Portland, Oregon in 1905, attended by Washington suffragists like Emma Smith DeVoe and Cora Smith Eaton. They returned to Washington re-energized and began fresh campaigns for suffrage. DeVoe advertised new suffrage organizations with the popular women's clubs of the time, and in several years suffragist organizations were popular again across the state.

=== New campaigns ===
DeVoe was president of WESA and a paid organizer for NAWSA, and she led the Washington campaign for women's suffrage alongside May Arkwright Hutton, a mine owner, philanthropist, and suffrage strategist. Hutton was WESA's first vice-president. For the 1908 Democratic Party Convention, Hutton wanted WESA to push the democrats to adopt a plaform of enfranchising "all voters, regardless of sex, race, color". DeVoe's husband told her that this would hurt the suffrage movement in the Southern U.S. Hutton attended the convention, which did not choose to pursue widespread enfranchisement, but labor leader Samuel Gompers told Hutton that her proposal would eventually dominate.

WESA's strategy was to quietly amend the state constitution with the support of the many progressives in state government. DeVoe and state senator George Cotterill co-created an amendment that simply described itself as "relating to the quaflification of the voters within this State." The state government passed the amendment, and it was signed in February 25, 1909. Suffragists then needed to campaign so that the public would vote for the amendment in 1910.

During this time, DeVoe and Hutton began to clash over strategy, with DeVoe trying to remain subtle and Hutton aiming for more forceful campaigning. Hutton left WESA and created the Washington Political Equality League in July 1909, at the same time that many other suffragists created other organizations, unhappy with DeVoe's leadership. Many women in the state wrote pro-suffrage articles, WESA created Votes for Women, and suffragists focused on one-on-one persuasion rather than rallies or militancy, unlike other U.S. and U.K. organizations.

Anti-suffrage leaders were not as prominent during this election. Mark A. Matthews spoke forcefully against suffrage at the First Presbyterian Church in Seattle. Eliza Ferry Leary, the daughter of Washington's first governor, did not do much in her role as an anti-suffrage representative. The saloon lobby did not push against women's suffrage as much as it had in the past, likely because they were focused on blocking the rise of prohibition laws.

In 1909, the Alaska-Yukon-Pacific Exposition put Seattle and Washington State in general in the national spotlight. Both the Washington Equal Suffrage Association (WESA) and NAWSA held their annual conventions in Seattle in July 1909, and July 7 was declared Suffrage Day at the A-Y-P Exposition itself. The A-Y-P Exposition included hundreds of exhibits, and several were hosted by suffrage organizations to promote women's suffrage.

=== Constitutional amendments ===
In 1910, women gained the right to vote in Washington. Amendment 6 to the state constitution was ratified on November 8, 1910, which said "there shall be no denial of the elective franchise at any election on account of sex", but still disenfranchised Native Americans: "Indians not taxed shall never be allowed the elective franchise". Every county in Washington had wound up in favor of the amendment, and support was largely diverse across political parties and demographics.

Washington became the fifth state in the U.S. to enfranchise women, many years behind Wyoming in 1890, Colorado in 1893, Idaho in 1896, and Utah in 1897. Washington's passage of women's suffrage was able to inspire momentum towards the broader suffrage movement, which coalesced around a national campaign for women's suffrage at the federal level. Many Western states quickly followed Washington, including California, Arizona, Oregon, Montana, and Nevada.

In the following election, Frances C. Axtell and Nena Jolidon Croake were elected as the first women to serve in the Washington Legislature. Women voted in the same proportion as men did, and were a significant reason that laws were passed supporting pensions for mothers, women's eight-hour workday, Prohibition, and children's health. They also played a large role in recalling Seattle's mayor, Hiram Gill, on the basis of enabling gambling and prostitution to rise.

The U.S. Congress passed the 19th Amendment to the U.S. Constitution on June 4, 1919, which specified that "the right of citizens of the United States to vote shall not be denied or abridged by the United States or by any State on account of sex." To become law, it needed to be ratified, approved by at least 36 states. Washington ratified the 18th amendment on March 22, 1920. The 19th Amendment was approved by enough states to become fully ratified on August 26, 1920.
