= George Ross Kirkpatrick =

American activist (1867–1937)

Kirk Kirkpatrick
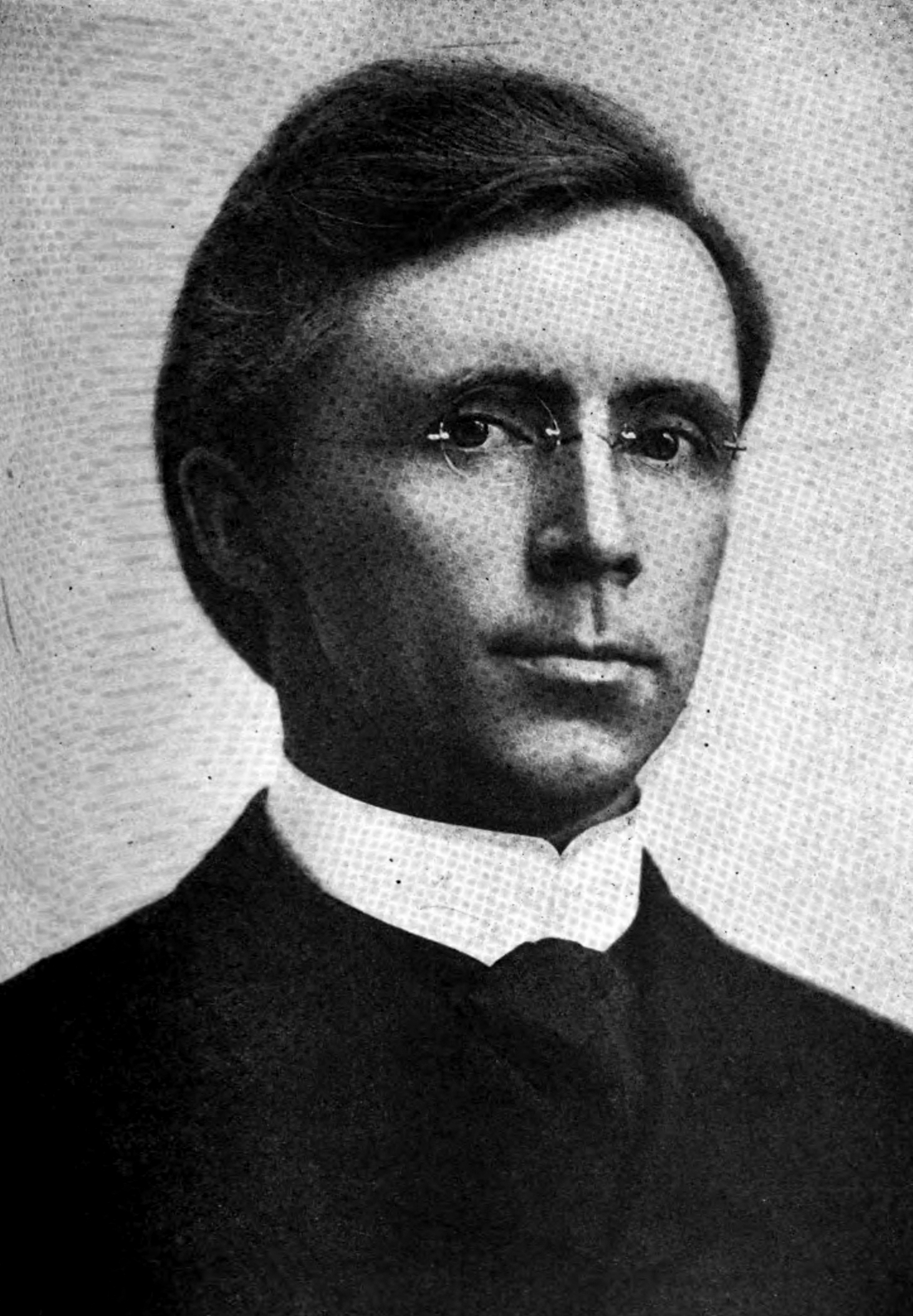
- Kirkpatrick c. 1916

Executive Secretary of the Socialist Party of America
- In office November 1925 – May 1926
- Preceded by: Bertha Hale White
- Succeeded by: William H. Henry

Personal details
- Born: George Ross Kirkpatrick; February 24, 1867 West Lafayette, Ohio, U.S.
- Died: March 23, 1937 (aged 70) San Gabriel, California, U.S.
- Party: Socialist (1903–1937)
- Education: Ohio Wesleyan University; Albion College (BA); Vanderbilt University; University of Chicago
- Occupation: Educator, writer, activist

George Ross "Kirk" Kirkpatrick (February 24, 1867 – March 23, 1937) was an American educator, anti-militarist writer and political activist. He is best remembered as the 1916 vice presidential nominee of the Socialist Party of America. He was briefly the Executive Secretary of that organization from November 1925 until May 1926.

== Biography ==
=== Early years ===
George Ross Kirkpatrick was born February 24, 1867, in West Lafayette, Ohio, the son of a farmer. He attended Allegheny College Preparatory School before enrolling in Ohio Wesleyan University. He received his bachelor's degree from Albion College and did graduate coursework at Vanderbilt University and the University of Chicago.

Upon graduation, Kirkpatrick worked as a teacher at Kansas Methodist College and Ripon College for 4 years before moving to the Socialist Party-affiliated Rand School of Social Science in New York City.

=== Political career ===
Kirkpatrick joined the Socialist Party of America in 1903. For nearly 20 years thereafter Kirkpatrick traveled across America as a lecturer for the party, speaking to general audiences on the topic of militarism and other political and economic questions.

In 1910 he self-published his first full-length book, a blistering attack on militarism called War — What For? The first printing of 2500 copies sold out almost immediately and the book was subsequently reprinted many times over the course of the decade.

The widespread popularity among the party rank-and-file of Kirkpatrick's 1910 book, War — What For? was key to his being chosen as the Socialist Party's VP nominee in 1916.

Kirkpatrick's first book would be his best known, touted by Socialist journalist William M. Feigenbaum "one of the really great works of the spirit in American history." Feigenbaum recalled:

"Written and widely circulated before the outbreak of the World War, it had an important influence on the American people. It struck with sledgehammer blows, it marshaled facts and figures, seasoned them with irony and fierce earnestness, and flung the challenge of its title into a world that would be infinitely better off today if it had been heeded."

The work catapulted Kirkpatrick to prominence in the ranks of the Socialist Party of America. In 1916, a mail referendum of Socialist Party members elected Kirkpatrick as the party's vice presidential nominee, topping St. Louis feminist Kate Richards O'Hare in the contest. Kirkpatrick appeared on the ballot along with presidential hopeful Allan L. Benson and he toured extensively in support of the ticket.

In 1924, Kirkpatrick was in Chicago on the payroll of the Socialist Party as the manager of its "Department of Literature." In that capacity he prepared several propaganda leaflets which were distributed in quantity by the party during the 1924 campaign season: a first on the growing wealth of the capitalist class (a four-page leaflet entitled Silence!), another detailing the party's opposition to the then-booming Ku Klux Klan, and a third on unemployment. He also edited the party's monthly magazine, The Socialist World, with Executive Secretary Bertha Hale White's name appearing on the masthead of the publication as "Business Manager."

From November 15, 1925, Kirkpatrick served a brief stint as acting Executive Secretary of the Socialist Party, following the resignation of Bertha Hale White, herself a former teacher and journalist. Kirkpatrick, who had been serving as Organization Director, was elected Assistant Executive Secretary by the National Executive Committee at its meeting of October 10, on the heels of White tendering of her resignation effective in a month. Kirkpatrick's time at the helm of the declining organization was short, however, as William H. Henry of Indiana was chosen as a permanent Executive Secretary following the party's May 1–3, 1926 National Convention held in Pittsburgh.

Kirkpatrick later ran for U.S. Senate from Illinois on the Socialist Party ticket in 1928, and for the U.S. Senate from California in 1932 and 1934. In his final campaign Kirkpatrick garnered 110,000 votes.

Kirkpatrick was a delegate to the 1934 National Convention of the Socialist Party, held in Detroit, Michigan, at which he lined up with the Old Guard faction in opposition to the radical "Declaration of Principles" passed by the Militant faction.

=== Death and legacy ===
George Kirkpatrick died in California in March 1937, three weeks after his 70th birthday.

== Works ==
=== Books and pamphlets ===
- Mental Dynamite, or Little Lessons to Learn. 1906.
- War — What For? West LaFayette, OH: George Kirkpatrick, 1910. —Reissued in multiple editions, including Lithuanian and Finnish translations.
- For the Educated Proletariat: Some Questions. New York: Cooperative Press, n.d. [c. 1911].
- Think, or Surrender. Girard, KS: Appeal to Reason, 1916.
- The Socialists and the Sword. Chicago: Socialist Party, n.d. [c. 1916].
- War and the Working Class. n.c.: George R. Kirkpatrick, n.d. [c. 1916].
- The Slander of the Toilers. Pittsburgh, PA: The Collectivist Press, 1919.
- Silence! Chicago: Socialist Party, n.d. [May 1924].
- The Socialist Party and the Ku Klux Klan. Chicago: Socialist Party, 1924.
- Out of Work. Chicago, IL: Socialist Party, National Headquarters, [September 1924].
- Out of Work. Revised edition. Chicago: Socialist Party National Office, [1932].
- Is Plenty Too Much for the Common People? The Hottest Question that Ever Stung a Statesman or a Slave. Question! Question! Question! I Call for the Question! Illustrations by Art Young. San Gabriel, CA: Florence H. Kirkpatrick, 1939.

=== Articles ===
- "The Priceless Remnant," The Socialist World [Chicago], vol. 5, no. 4 (April 1924), pg. 5.
- "Fall In or Fall Out," The Socialist World [Chicago], vol. 5, no. 5 (May 1924), pp. 1, 3.
- "On to Cleveland Gladly — And Carefully," The Socialist World [Chicago], vol. 5, no. 6 (June 1924), pg. 14.
- "The Enemy Opens Fire Upon the Workers — With Lies," The Socialist World [Chicago], vol. 5, no. 7 (July 1924), pp. 6–7.
- "One Hundred Days!" The Socialist World [Chicago], vol. 5, no. 8 (August 1924), pp. 1–3.
- "Our Charter of Liberties," The Socialist World [Chicago], vol. 5, no. 11 (November 1924), pp. 5–6.
- "Looking Ahead," The Socialist World [Chicago], vol. 5, no. 11 (November 1924), pp. 10, 15.
- "The Crucifixion of the Children," The Socialist World [Chicago], vol. 5, no. 12 (December 1924), pp. 5–6.
- "Certain Difficulties," The Socialist World [Chicago], vol. 6, no. 1 (January 1925), pp. 15–16.
- "The Proletariat and the Right of Revolution," The Socialist World [Chicago], vol. 6, no. 2 (February 1925), pp. 12–14.
- "'Taken!'" The Socialist World [Chicago], vol. 6, no. 5 (May 1925), pp. 5–6.
- "Join the Army," The Socialist World [Chicago], vol. 6, no. 6 (June 1925), pp. 1–3.
- "The Significance of Youth in Social Progress," The Socialist World [Chicago], vol. 6, no. 6 (June 1925), pp. 10–11.
- "Christ in China, or — Why Hesitate?" The Socialist World [Chicago], vol. 6, no. 7 (July 1925), pp. 1–2.
- "The International and Labor Congress of 1925," The Socialist World [Chicago], vol. 6, no. 7 (July 1925), pg. 7.

== Footnotes ==
Party political offices
Preceded by Emil Seidel	Socialist nominee for Vice President of the United States; 1916	Succeeded by Seymour Stedman
