= Bertha Hale White =

American socialist

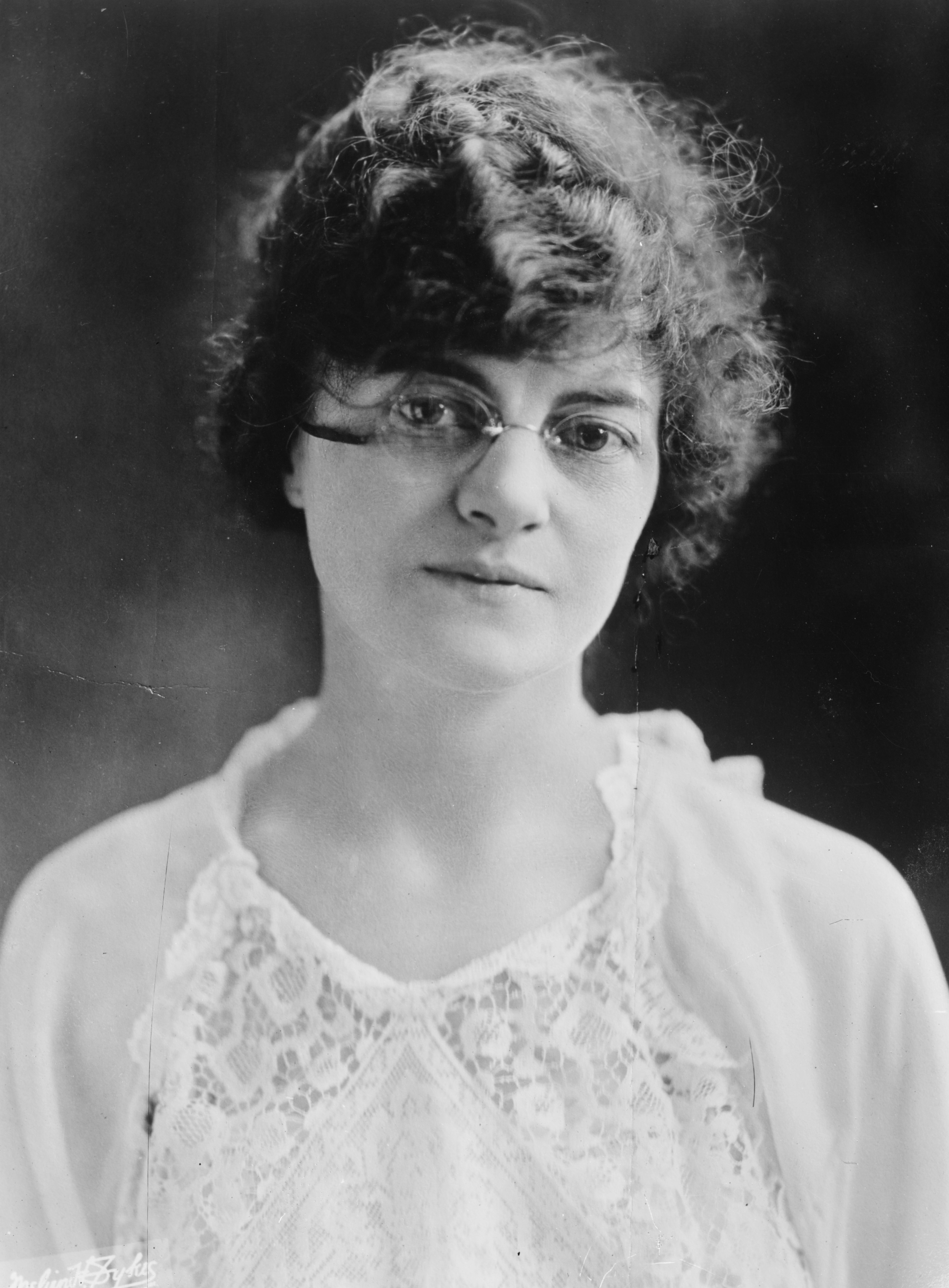
Bertha Hale White circa 1913.

Bertha Hale White (1876 – October 3, 1961), was a teacher and journalist, and a prominent functionary of the Socialist Party of America. After serving for more than a decade in the party's National Office, in February 1924 White was named Executive Secretary of the SPA, becoming the first woman to hold that position. She resigned the post, citing reasons of health, late in 1925. In 1926, White married lecturer and writer Judson King and took his name, becoming Bertha Hale King.

== Biography ==
=== Early years ===
Bertha Hale White was born in Nashville, Illinois, the daughter of a farmer. She attended primary school in Golden City, Missouri and High School in Fort Smith, Arkansas. Upon graduation, White attended the Buckner Normal School in Salem, Arkansas and took correspondence courses from the University of Chicago to become a teacher.

She worked variously as a teacher and journalist following the completion of her education.

=== Political career ===
White went to work in the national office of the Socialist Party of America (SPA) in 1913, becoming Assistant National Secretary of the Socialist Party of America in 1919 and continuing in that role until 1924. During this interval, White served as the office manager for the Socialist Party at its national headquarters in Chicago, Illinois, handling the day-to-day affairs of the organization.

In February 1924, the National Executive Committee of the SPA gathered for its regular quarterly session at the Hotel Majestic in St. Louis, Missouri. There the NEC received the February 1, 1924, resignation of Otto Branstetter of Oklahoma as Executive Secretary, a man who had characterized himself as "tired and worn out." The NEC named Assistant Executive Secretary White as his replacement on February 9, making her the first woman to head the Socialist Party of America.

Bertha Hale White resigned as Executive Secretary of the Socialist Party on November 4, 1925, citing reasons of health. She was succeeded by lecturer and writer George R. Kirkpatrick on a temporary basis.

In accepting her resignation, Socialist Party National Chairman Eugene V. Debs drafted a testimonial thanking White for her services. Debs declared:

"As our National Executive Secretary, Mrs. White has genuinely distinguished herself as a capable executive officer, managing the office with high efficiency and representing the National Office with dignity and resourcefulness reflecting great credit upon our party. * * *

"Her beautiful comradeliness, her never-failing, uncomplaining cooperation, her unusual dignity as our representative, and her splendid personal worth have endeared Mrs. White to us, and we deeply and sincerely regret her decision to resign as our National Executive Secretary.... Our affection for Mrs. White is equaled only by our feeling of gratitude and admiration for her truly beautiful and most capable cooperation with us."

White married writer and political activist Judson King (1872–1958) in 1926. After that date, she was known as Bertha Hale King and seems to have distanced herself from organized socialist activity.

=== Death and legacy ===
In 1959, Bertha Hale King donated the extensive papers of her late husband to the Manuscript Division of the Library of Congress in Washington, D.C., where they are today available for the use of scholars without copyright restriction.

Mrs. Bertha Hale King died on Tuesday, October 3, 1961, in Fort Smith, Arkansas where she had been residing with her sister.

== Works ==
While Bertha Hale White did not publish any books or pamphlets in her lifetime, she was an occasional contributor of articles to the Socialist press.

- "What Will You Do With It?" The Socialist World [Chicago], vol. 1, no. 4 (October 15, 1920), pp. 6–7.
- "The Thin Red Line," The Socialist World [Chicago], vol. 2, no. 8 (September 1921), pp. 4–5.
- "The Enemy Within," The Socialist World [Chicago], vol. 4, no. 3 (March 1923), pp. 5–8. —Accusation that Communist Party leader Alexander Stoklitsky was an employee of a detective agency.
- "The Legion Again," The Socialist World [Chicago], vol. 4, no. 10 (October 1923), pp. 13–14.
- "The Socialist Party in the Coming Campaign," The Socialist World [Chicago], vol. 5, no. 2 (February 1924), pp. 4–5.
- "'Wait a While?' Impossible!" The Socialist World [Chicago], vol. 5, no. 4 (April 1924), pg. 4.
- "Looking Forward," The Socialist World [Chicago], vol. 5, no. 11 (November 1924), pp. 3–4.
- "The Chicago Conventions," The Socialist World [Chicago], vol. 6, no. 3 (March 1925), pp. 3–5.
- "Report to the National Convention of the Socialist Party: Chicago, February 23–24, 1925," The Socialist World [Chicago], vol. 6, no. 3 (March 1925), pp. 8–12.
- "The New Plan to Build the Party," The Socialist World [Chicago], vol. 6, no. 5 (May 1925), pp. 2–4.

== See also ==
- Socialist Party of America
- Judson King
