= Edwin Hartley Pratt =

American physician

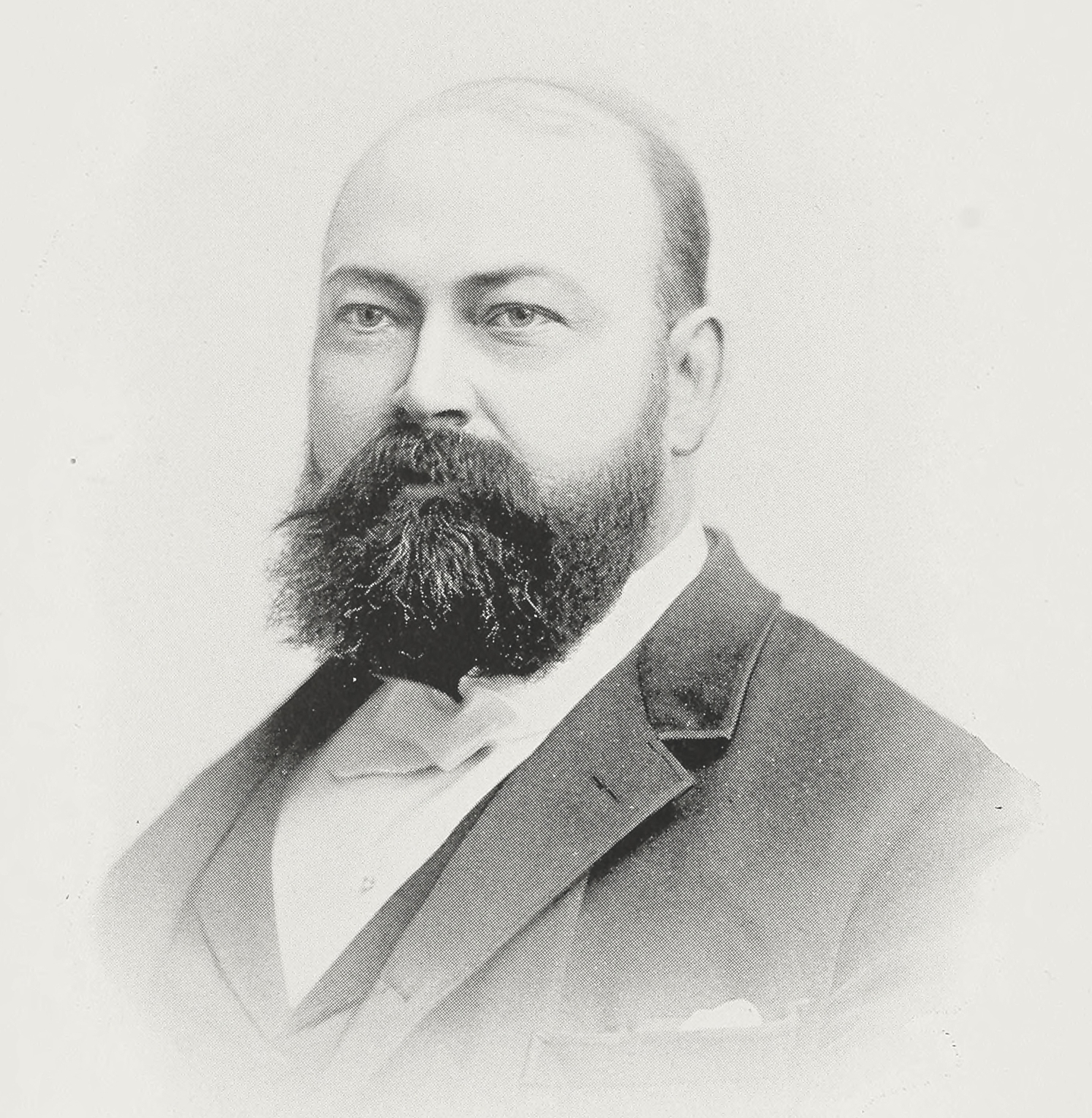
- Edwin Hartley Pratt, c. 1890s
- Born: November 6, 1849; Towanda, Pennsylvania
- Died: March 6, 1930 (aged 80); Galva, Illinois
- Other name: E.H. Pratt
- Occupation: Homeopathic doctor

Signature
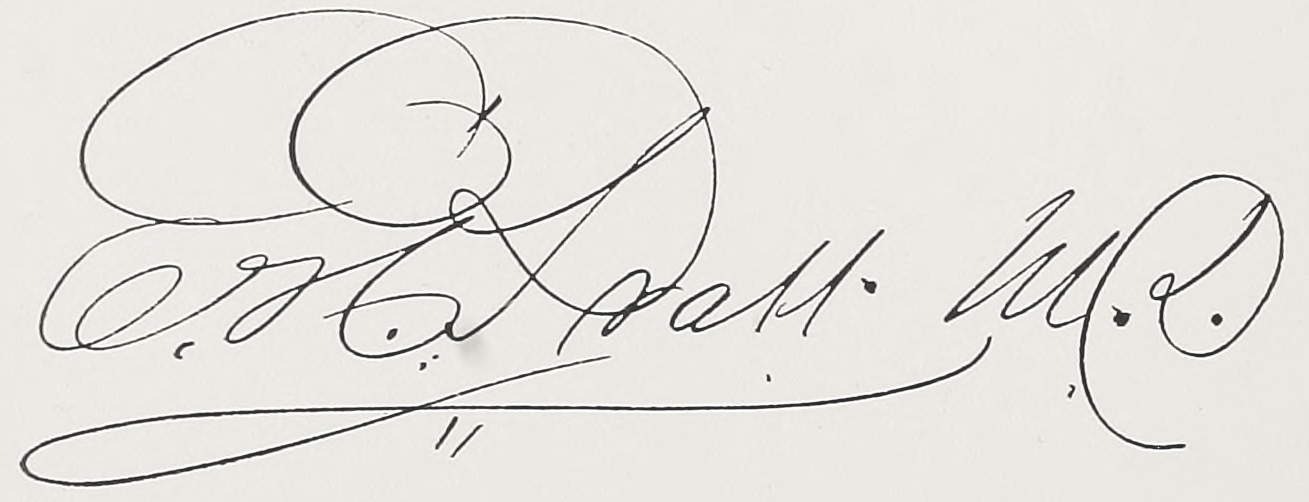

Edwin Hartley Pratt (1849–1930), or E.H. Pratt, was an American practitioner of homeopathic medicine in the late 19th and early 20th centuries. He originated the briefly popular practice of "orificial surgery", which sought to cure a variety of physical and psychological ills by surgical corrections to the various orifices of the body. He was the founder and editor-in-chief of the Journal of Orificial Surgery.

Pratt served for 20 years as attending surgeon for Cook County Hospital, and also founded his own institute, the Lincoln Park Sanitarium. His ideas were extremely popular for a time, but fell into general disrepute by the early 20th century.

== Early life and education ==
Edwin Hartley Pratt was born on November 6, 1849, in Towanda, Pennsylvania. His parents were Betsey Belding Pratt and the homeopathic physician Leonard Pratt. In 1852, they moved to northwestern Illinois; in his boyhood, Pratt attended the district school in Rock Creek Township.

At the age of 15 in 1864, Pratt attended the nearby Mount Carroll Seminary (later known as Shimer College). He remained there only one year, but thirty years later wrote that "I was so impressed with the measures of instruction, and such a spirit of earnestness prevailed in the school, that the memory of that year's work has never been dimmed by the rushing and turbulent experiences of the years that have since gone by".

Pratt next enrolled in Wheaton College. At the time, the college was strongly identified with anti-Masonic beliefs, and forbade all students from joining secret societies. When his father joined the Independent Order of Good Templars in 1865, Pratt joined him as a member of the order; Soon thereafter, he was given the choice of expulsion or leaving the order, and chose expulsion. His father sued the school over the expulsion, but ultimately lost before the Illinois Supreme Court in Pratt v. Wheaton College, which established the principle of in loco parentis in Illinois common law.

Moving on from Wheaton, in 1866, Pratt enrolled at the old University of Chicago, in the second year of the preparatory department; he completed the preparatory and baccalaureate courses and graduated in 1871. He was a member of the Tri Kappa literary society and Delta Kappa Epsilon fraternity.

Pratt had initially hoped to become a lawyer, but was prevailed upon by his physician father to enter into medicine instead. In 1873 he received his MD from Hahnemann Medical College in Chicago, a homeopathic school where his father was teaching. He graduated as valedictorian. Upon graduation he was invited to join the faculty as an adjunct professor, and did so after an additional term of study at Jefferson Medical College and "Keene's School of Anatomy" in Philadelphia.

== Medical career ==
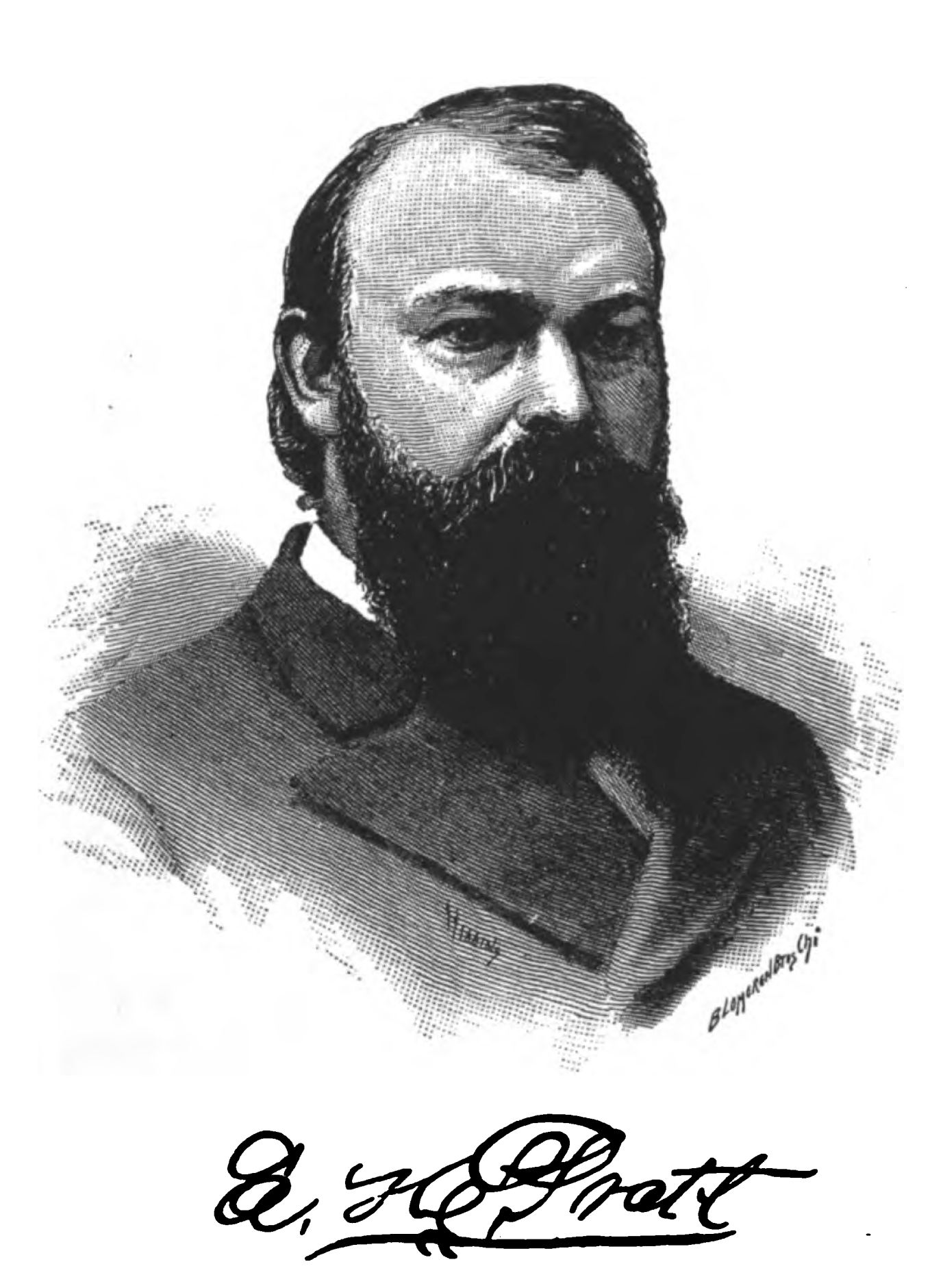
An 1886 portrait

For his first ten years as a homeopathic physician, Pratt worked in general practice, only later moving into surgery. He became a full professor of anatomy at Hahnemann in 1874, leaving to take a professorship at the Chicago Homeopathic College in 1877. In 1883, he resigned that position to take the chair of surgery, in which capacity he also oversaw the school's busy clinic.

Pratt established the Lincoln Park Sanitarium in 1889, incorporating it in 1890. The Sanitarium occupied a five-story structure of Bedford limestone at the intersection of Lake View and Deming, overlooking Chicago's Lincoln Park.

He closed the Lincoln Park Sanitarium in 1895 to open the "Pratt Sanatorium", which was a smaller operation located in a two-story building on west Diversey Avenue in Chicago. Pratt described his reason for closing the Lincoln Park Sanitarium as "purely a financial one", prompted by falling numbers of patients in the aftermath of the Panic of 1893.

In 1902, Pratt served as president of the Illinois Homeopathic Association.

=== Orificial surgery ===
Pratt rarely saw an orifice that was not in need of a surgeon's scalpel.
— Ira M. Rutkow

Pratt's "orificial philosophy" held that most health problems were due to malformations of the orifices—all orifices of the body, including the nose and mouth, but usually specifically those located below the waist. The numbers of those subjected to orificial surgery during its brief heyday are estimated in the tens of thousands.

Pratt's ideas do not appear to have ever had any evidentiary backing. The remarkable success of his ideas, which drew hundreds of surgeons to the cause, has been attributed to his "salesmanship skills".

There is one predisposing cause for all forms of chronic diseases, and that is a nerve-waste occasioned by orificial irritation at the lower openings of the body.
—E.H. Pratt, 1891

According to his own much-retold account, Pratt came up with the idea of orificial surgery while supervising the Chicago Homeopathic College clinic, which he took over as head of surgery in 1883. He gave his first public lecture on the concept in 1886, on the topic of "Chronic Diseases from a Surgical Stand-Point". As he spoke, "there came upon him a flood of light", and he held his audience in rapt attention. His speech was sufficiently persuasive that "sixteen members of the class presented themselves for treatment under the new discovery". The National Association of Orificial Surgeons was formed soon thereafter, with a constitutional provision that Dr. Pratt would be the only one ever granted honorary membership.

Pratt frequently prescribed circumcision and other adjustments of the genitals as a preventative for masturbation and other "unnatural" behaviors. He was a particularly strong advocate of circumcision as a cure for rape, opining that if only rapists "had received the proper orificial attention earlier in their lives their criminal career would undoubtedly have been prevented." He advocated removal of the hood of the clitoris as a cure for female masturbation, and hysterectomies as a cure for female insanity.

== Other activities ==
In 1877, Pratt married Isadore Bailey. They had two children, both of whom died young. Both of the Pratts were members of a Chicago musical society, the Apollo Club. After Isadore's death, Pratt married Charlotte Kelly in 1900.

Pratt was active in the New Thought movement. He contributed a glowing introduction to the 1907 publication of the Baha'i text The School of the Prophets, by Mirza Assad'u'llah.

== Death and legacy ==
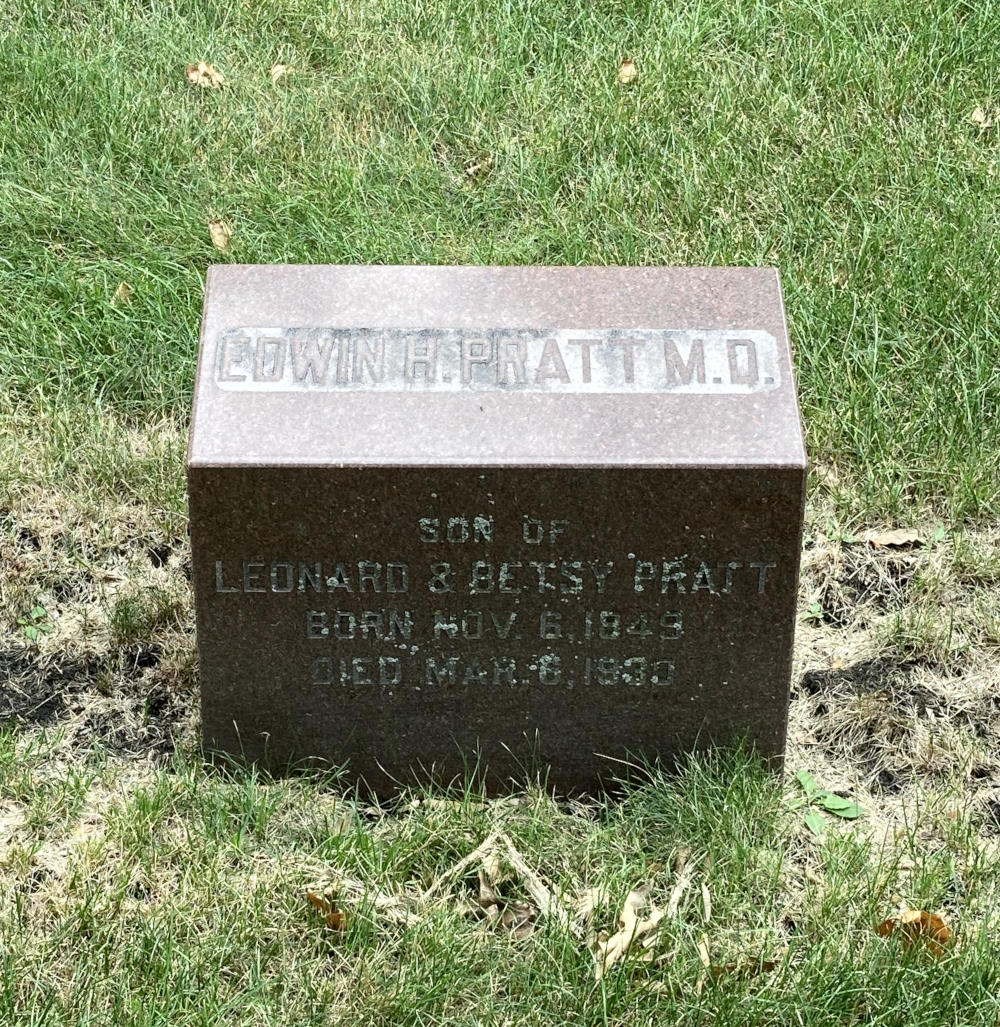
Pratt's grave at Graceland Cemetery

Pratt died after prolonged ill health on March 6, 1930, in Galva, Illinois. His remains were conveyed to Chicago and laid to rest in the Graceland Cemetery. He was survived by his wife Charlotte.

Pratt's medical ideas did not outlive him. As historian Ira Rutkow observed, "by the 1920s, orificial surgery had become little more than a vague memory". The Journal of Orificial Surgery had closed down in 1901; the American Association of Orificial Surgeons continued meeting into the 1910s, but faded away soon thereafter, closing down for good in 1925.

To the extent that Pratt and his ideas are remembered at all in the present day, it is for their connection to debates on circumcision and female genital mutilation. Pratt's ideas are sometimes cited as evidence of the fallacious historical basis for male circumcision, and particularly its connection with the desire to prevent masturbation.

== Writings ==
- Orificial Surgery (1891)
- The Composite Man as Comprehended in Fourteen Anatomical Impersonations (1902)
- Speech to the fourth International Congress on School Hygiene (1913)
- Page from the Early History of Orificial History, date uncertain, published 1914

== Works cited ==
- Rutkow, I.M. (1993). "Edwin Hartley Pratt and orificial surgery: unorthodox surgical practice in nineteenth century". Surgery. 114 (3): 558–63. PMID 8367812.
- "Edwin Hartley Pratt". The Biographical Dictionary and Portrait Gallery of Representative Men of Chicago, St. Louis and the World's Columbian Exposition, Part 2. American Biographical Publishing Company. 1892. pp. 468–473.
- "Edwin Hartley Pratt, A.M., M.D., LL.D.". A History of the City of Chicago: Its Men and Institutions. Chicago Inter-Ocean. 1900. pp. 425–426.
- King, William Harvey (1905). History of homoeopathy and its institutions in America. Vol. 4. pp. 254–255.
- "Edwin Hartley Pratt". Portrait and Biographical Record of Cook and Dupage Counties, Illinois. Lake City Publishing Company. 1894. pp. 418–421.
- Cutler, Harry Gardner (1896). "Edwin Hartley Pratt". Medical and dental colleges of the west: historical and biographical: Chicago. pp. 320–327.
