= Cora Smith Eaton =

American physician and suffragist

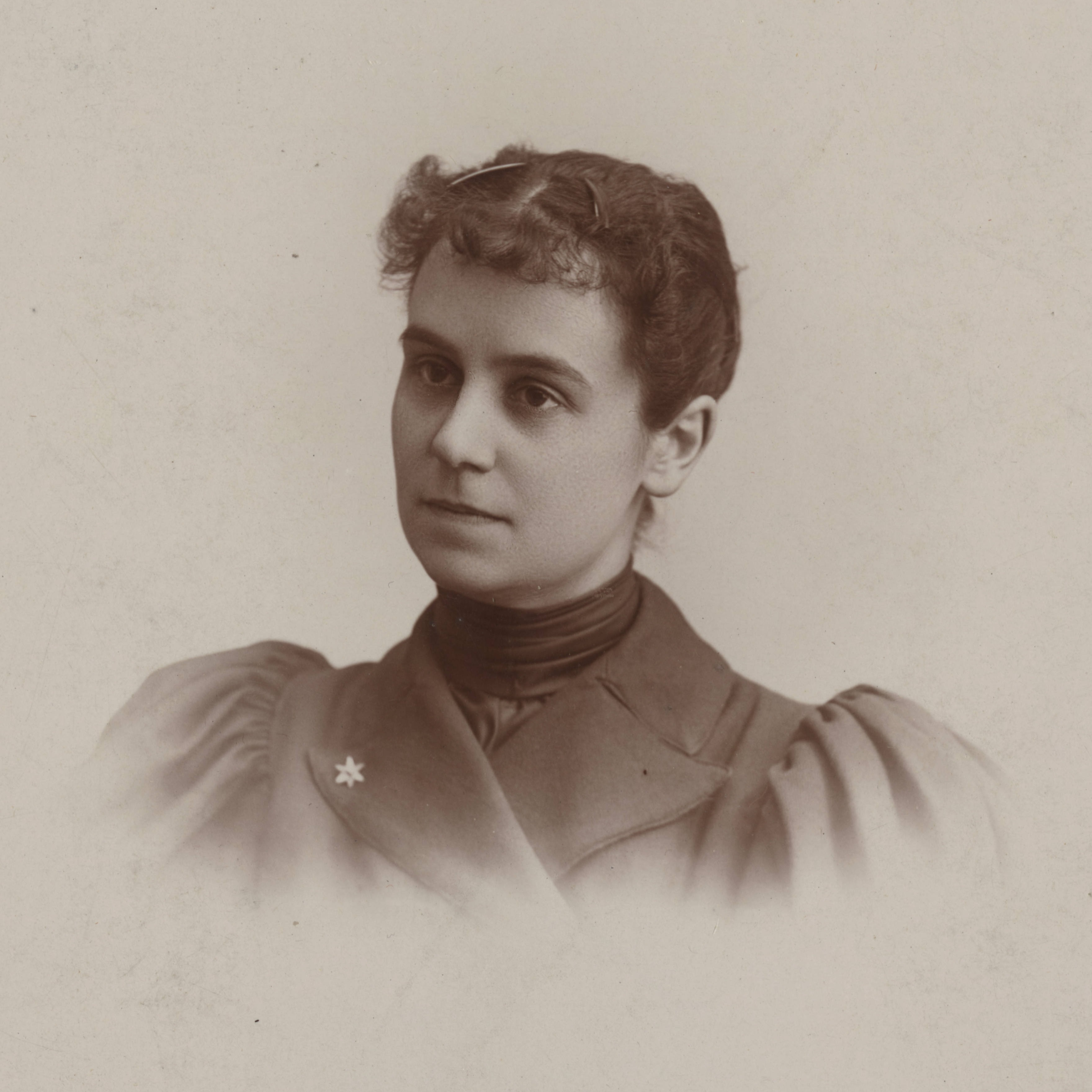
- Born: Cora Eliza Smith; September 7, 1867; Rockford, Illinois
- Died: November 21, 1939 (aged 72); Hollywood, California
- Occupations: Physician; Mountaineer; Suffragist

Cora Eliza Smith Eaton King (September 7, 1867 – November 21, 1939) was an American suffragist, physician and mountaineer. She was the first woman in North Dakota licensed to practice medicine. She was a prominent member of Washington's suffrage movement.

== Early life ==
Cora Eliza Smith was born on September 7, 1867, in Rockford, Illinois, to Colonel Eliphaz Smith and Sara Barnes. Her family moved to the Dakota Territory and settled in Grand Forks. She attended the National School of Elocution and Oratory in Philadelphia, Pennsylvania, where she took up the cause of women's suffrage.

After her graduation in 1886, she returned to the Dakota Territory to study at the University of North Dakota. While studying at the university, she taught arithmetic, geography, spelling and handwriting. She was also the first woman to teach physical education at the University of North Dakota, as she taught a course on girl’s calisthenics. She graduated in 1889 with a Bachelor of Science as a member of the university's first graduating class.

== Career ==
While completing her degree at the University of North Dakota, Smith became involved in suffrage work. She helped to form the Grand Forks Woman Suffrage Association in 1888 with her mother and was elected as the first secretary. During the Constitutional Convention for North Dakota in July 1889, Henry Blackwell asked Smith to speak in his place to advocate for the state constitution to provide for women's suffrage. The following year, she and her mother were among the first women to vote in Grand Forks, as the newly-incorporated North Dakota allowed women to vote in special school elections.

She subsequently studied at the Boston University School of Medicine and graduated in 1892 with her M.D. After returning to Grand Forks, she became the first woman in the state licensed to practice medicine. In 1893, she married attorney Robert A. Eaton. While in North Dakota, Smith became president of the Grand Forks Woman Suffrage Association and later the North Dakota Equal Suffrage Association. She also represented the state at the annual National American Woman Suffrage Association meeting in January 1896 and would later serve as the organization's second auditor twice.

Later that year, she and her husband moved to Minneapolis, Minnesota. She joined the American Association of Orificial Surgeons as it was one of the first medical organizations that would allow women and practice homeopathic medicine. Smith trained with Edwin Hartley Pratt and performed female circumcisions on women suffering from chronic conditions such as headaches and epilepsy.

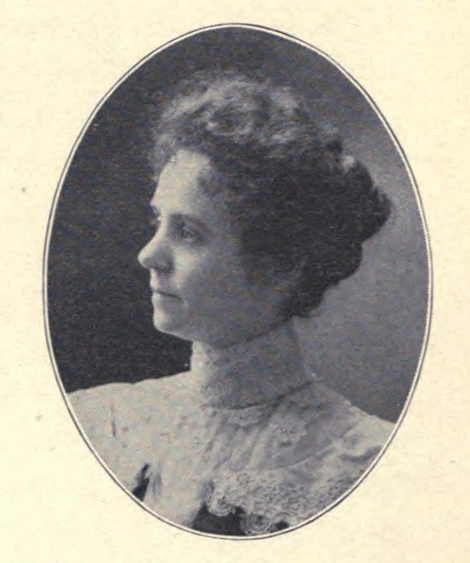
1902

In 1906, Smith moved to King County, Washington, after divorcing her first husband. She established a medical practice in Seattle. There, she took up mountain climbing, and was a founding member as well as the first secretary of The Mountaineers. In 1907, she became the first woman to summit the East Peak of Mount Olympus, and she eventually climbed all six of Washington's major mountains.

Smith was active in the women's movement in Washington and was the treasurer of the Washington Equal Suffrage Association. She co-authored a chapter of the organization's book, Washington Women's Cook Book, which was published in 1908. In 1909, she was responsible for carrying a pennant that read "Votes For Women" to the summit of Mount Rainier on a Mountaineers expedition.

By the end of her career, Smith was licensed to practice medicine in several U.S. states. She was married to Dr. Robert A. Eaton and also to Judson King.

== Death and legacy ==
She died on November 21, 1939, in Hollywood, California. Cora Smith Hall at the University of North Dakota was named for her in 1964.
