= Linda Deziah Jennings =

Linda Deziah Jennings (1870–1932) was an American women's suffrage activist and cookbook editor, based in Washington state. She was the editor of Washington Women's Cook Book (1908), which was published by the Washington Equal Suffrage Association. The cookbook, which was a charity cookbook, served as a fundraiser for the group and helped to bring the cause of suffrage into Washington homes.

== Early life ==
In 1870, Linda Deziah Jennings was born in New Jersey. Her parents were Isaac Jennings and Margaret James. The family then moved to LaConner, Washington. Her father farmed on Whidbey Island, and he then relocated the family to Ridgeview area. In the late 19th century, Jennings studied at the University of Washington. In 1893, Jennings attended the World's Columbian Exposition in Chicago.

== Early work ==
In the early 1900s, Jennings became involved in the Washington Equal Suffrage Association, which was led by its founder, Emma DeVoe. At that time, Jennings attended annual meetings in Seattle, which were organized by the association. In 1903, she was a speaker at the Skagit Farmers' Institute.

Throughout her life, Jennings supported herself as a writer. She wrote for West Coast publications, such as Coast Magazine, where her short story, "The Finding of a Prodigal," was published in 1902. The story, as the magazine editor explained, "vividly [exposed] the social conditions existing among many of the early pioneer settlements, when it was no unusual occurrence for white men to take native Indian women." In 1905, The Pacific Monthly published her story, "The Rural Phone," which portrays a sexist man in a town.

== Washington Women's Cook Book ==
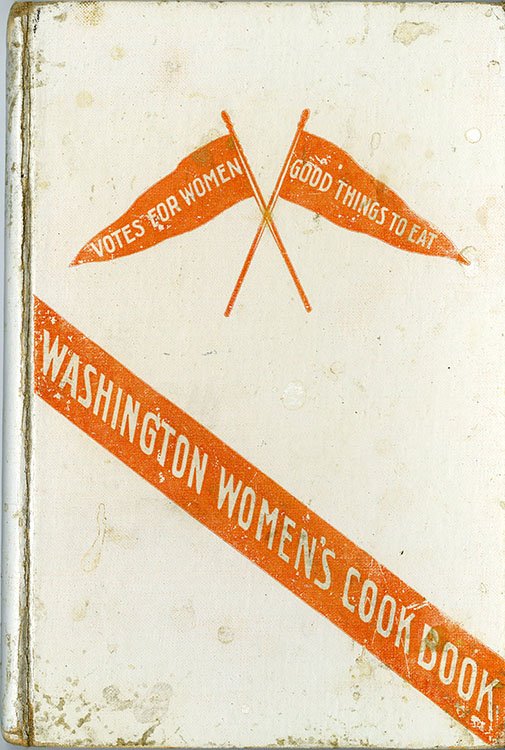
Washington Women's Cookbook by Linda Deziah Jennings, 1909

From the late 19th to early 20th century, charity cookbooks were popular in the United States. One of the earliest examples had been A Poetical Cookbook (1864) by Maria J. Moss, which helped raise funds for the medical costs of Union Army soldiers during the American Civil War. It is estimated that about 3,000 charity cookbooks were published between 1864 and 1922. These cookbooks were typically developed by women-led community and church groups.

In 1908, Jennings served as the editor for Washington Women's Cook Book. The 256-page book collected recipes, homemaking tips, and beauty tips that had been voluntarily submitted by suffragists from the state of Washington. The recipes covered a range of meal types, such as breads, entrees, soups, "pineapple desserts," "sailor's recipes," canned foods, and preserved foods. In addition, the book contained political essays with titles such as "How Washington Women Lost the Ballot," written by Adella M. Parker, and "Progress of Woman Suffrage." The book was dedicated to “the first woman who realized that half the human race were not getting a square deal, and who had the courage to voice a protest.”

The inclusion of recipes helped soften the political message of the book, thereby making it more palpable to some women. As written by Paula Becker for Historylink:

The Washington Women's Cook Book soothed men who worried that voting women would throw off their domestic traces, and offered suffragists a Trojan horse. The thick pro-suffrage crust surrounding homey recipes invited a woman to peruse the message of equality while warming the oven to bake Hot Water Sponge Cake.

In 1909, the Washington State Legislature included a suffrage amendment, Article VI of the Washington Constitution, on the 1910 ballot. The cookbook was distributed as a form of advocacy for the amendment between 1909 and 1910, including at the Alaska-Yukon-Pacific Exposition. On November 8, 1910, male voters in Washington voted in support of women's right to vote. This helped inspire similar votes in other states, including California (1911), Alaska, Arizona, Oregon, and Kansas (1912), and Montana and Nevada (1913). However, the right for women to vote nationwide would only come with the passage of the 19th Amendment.

In 1976, the book was republished as part of Equal Rights Amendment advocacy. In 2020, an initiative was launched to publish an updated version of the cookbook.

== Death ==
In 1932, Jennings died in Washington state.
