= Emma Smith DeVoe =

American women's suffragist (1848–1927)

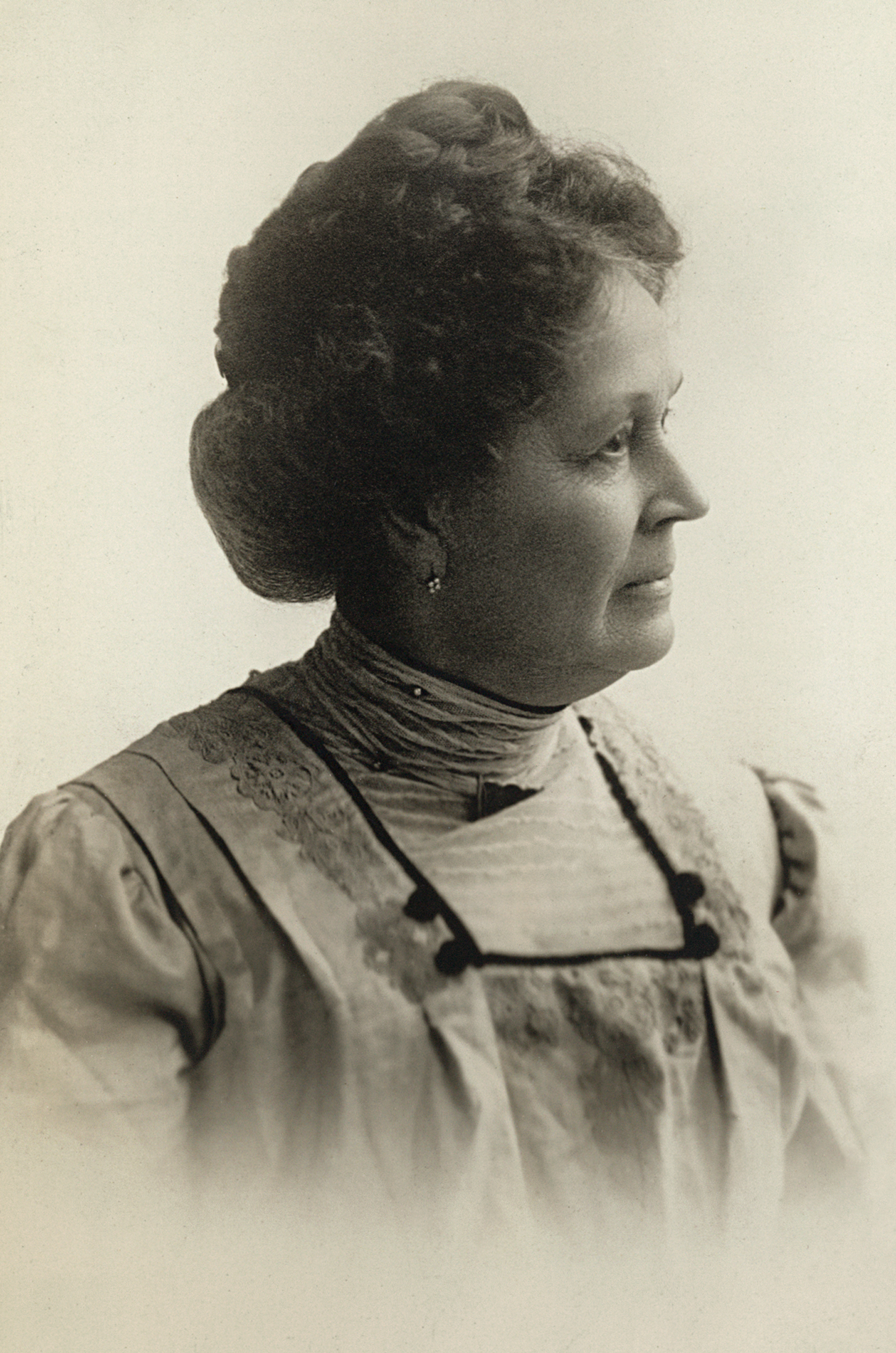
- Born: Emma Smith; August 22, 1848; Roseville, Illinois, U.S.
- Died: September 3, 1927 (aged 79); Tacoma, Washington, U.S.
- Occupation: Suffragist
- Spouse: John Henry DeVoe (m. 1880)

Emma Smith DeVoe (née Smith; August 22, 1848 – September 3, 1927) was an American women suffragist in the early twentieth century, changing the face of politics for both women and men alike. With May Arkwright Hutton, she led Washington's final women's suffrage movement. When she died, the Tacoma News Tribune called her Washington state's "Mother of Women's Suffrage".

== Early life ==
DeVoe was born on August 22, 1848, in Roseville, Illinois. As a child, she saw a speech made by Susan B. Anthony, which inspired her to become a women suffragist when she was only eight years old. In 1880, she married John Henry DeVoe, a Union veteran of the American Civil War of the 9th New York Heavy Artillery, who supported her throughout her life and aided her in her campaigns, which, in addition to women's suffrage, included reform, statehood, and temperance. She became an excellent public speaker over time and was mentored by Susan B. Anthony herself.

== Career ==
DeVoe campaigned for a suffrage amendment in South Dakota in 1890. Due to her organizational skills, in 1895 DeVoe was chosen to organize an official suffrage group in the state of Idaho. Her speeches centered on the idea that there were, in fact, peaceful solutions to international conflict and by winning the right to vote women would be able to help in this situation by passively bringing about changes.

Women in Idaho received the right to vote in 1896 thanks to her kind but effective speechmaking skills. She eventually gave speeches and organized new suffrage groups in 28 states and territories. For example, the National American Woman Suffrage Association sent her to Kentucky where she traveled the state from October 7 to November 3, 1897. Coordinating her tour with the Kentucky Equal Rights Association (KERA), she worked in 15 cities in less than a month, gathering cash collections from rallies and dues from the eight new local organizations she helped start.

In one of her earliest stops in Kentucky, she brought much needed national support to the beleaguered members of the Madison County Equal Rights Association—one of the first permanent suffrage clubs in the South. In the club's report to KERA regarding DeVoe's lecture at the courthouse in Richmond on October 9, 1897, Kate Rose Wiggins wrote that DeVoe was "a fine reasoner, giving a clear and forciable answer to all objections against Suffrage for women. Her lecture was highly appreciated, and several [new members] were added to our band."

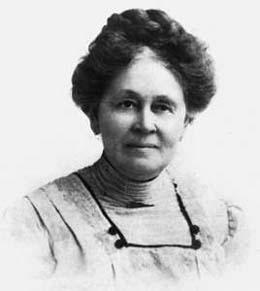
Emma Smith DeVoe

DeVoe was good at building coalitions with labor, men’s groups, and the Grange Associations. She ran polls to determine where voters stood on the issue of suffrage. She was responsible for implementing many high-profile strategies such as publishing cookbooks, organizing women’s days, and blanketing neighborhoods with posters. She would often begin her speeches with the statement, "There is nothing in the Constitution of the United States that should prevent women the right of franchise."

=== Washington State ===
The DeVoes moved to Tacoma, Washington in 1905. In 1906, she was named president of the Washington Equal Suffrage Association, taking over the revival of the movement. She worked as a paid organizer under Anna Howard Shaw and National American Woman Suffrage Association, where she organized chapters of suffragists, set up meetings, and gave lectures. At the Washington Equal Suffrage Association she added new tactics such as penny posters, rallies, parades, publicity stunts, and different speeches to cater to the Washington campaign's needs.

She published the Washington Women's Cook Book in 1908 in part as a fundraiser for the suffragist movement and also to demonstrate that gaining the right to vote would not change women's domestic role. The title page of the cookbook read: "Give us the vote and we will cook/ The better for a wide outlook." Reinforcing that women would not abandon their domestic duties upon gaining the right to vote, as was the fear of many men at the time, was a key strategy in Emma's campaign. These methods and her stance led to women winning the right to vote in 1910 by a 64% majority, making Washington the fifth state in the country to grant women's suffrage.

At the 1909 NAWSA convention, due to complaints from a number of members of the Washington Equal Suffrage Association over the tactics DeVoe used to be elected president, DeVoe lost her salary from NAWSA. Nonetheless, she continued her battle for women's suffrage in Washington, and in November 1910 the voters approved women's suffrage by a margin of two to one.

In 1911, after her rebuff by NAWSA followed by her successes in Washington state, DeVoe became a founder of the nonpartisan National Council of Women Voters (NCWV), which was composed of women from the five equal suffrage states of Wyoming, Colorado, Idaho, Utah, and Washington.

The NCWV was created in order to assist states with no suffrage movements, to improve conditions in the five member states, and to improve women's political, social, and economic status. Before the March 1919 NAWSA convention, DeVoe approved a plan to merge the NCWV with the NAWSA's successor, the National League of Women Voters. Historians often refer to the NCWV as an early prototype of the LWV.

Forging connections with both Republicans and Democrats, DeVoe eventually was able to convince the Washington legislature to ratify the Nineteenth Amendment in 1920.

== Later years and death ==
DeVoe chose to become a very politically active Republican after the demanding years of working for the suffrage movement passed. At the Republican State convention in 1920, she was the only woman to be chosen as a presidential elector. She later began writing a Republican column from the women's point of view for the Tacoma News Tribune, and was eventually made vice-chairman of the Washington State Republican Party. She was one of the first people to propose the idea of voting based on issues rather than for a specific party.

On September 3, 1927, DeVoe died aged 79. She was inducted into the National Women's Hall of Fame in 2000.
