= Personal Liberty League =

American political lobby group

The Personal Liberty League (PLL) was a series of ad hoc political lobby groups formed throughout the United States (mainly at state and local levels) in the late 1860s through the 1920s.

They were organized in response to the threat posed to the liquor industry by the growing political strength of the American temperance movement. Businessmen and other antiprohibitionists organized the first Personal Liberty League in Massachusetts in 1867 to fight for repeal of the state's prohibitory Maine Law. Such organizations proliferated throughout the country over the next several decades. They also opposed women's suffrage.

One of the first references to the purpose of the PLL was found in an 1873 article in the American German language newspaper Illinois Staats-Zeitung published in Chicago, IL. "The aim of the "Personal Liberty League" is to protect the liberty of the individual against the law."

In addition to political lobbying, the Leagues also attempted to mediate between the Temperance groups and the brewers and liquor dealers to ameliorate the worst aspects of the spirits trade. For example, local chapters campaigned to have saloons close during church hours.

By 1900, the PLL expanded its lobbying efforts to include opposition to the anti-gambling movement - especially in horse-racing.
