= Robert M. Pollock =

American politician (1856–1920)

Robert Middleton Pollock (December 16, 1856 – October 19, 1920), also known as R. M. Pollock, was a Republican member of the North Dakota House of Representatives from 1901–1902 and served as Speaker of the North Dakota House of Representatives. He was also a member of the constitutional convention that drafted the North Dakota Constitution in 1889.

== Personal life ==
Pollock was born in Racine County, Wisconsin to James Pollock and Evaline Halstead. His father was a farmer who moved to Wisconsin from New York City in 1848. Pollock had 8 brothers and sisters. He attended public schools in Wisconsin and studied law, passing the Wisconsin Bar in 1879.

In 1880, he came to North Dakota via Fargo, North Dakota. According to some of his descendants, he originally was discouraged by the "river town" and the climate, and briefly considered returning to Racine. However, the Northern Pacific Railroad was being built through the area, and he ultimately followed it west to the current town of Casselton, North Dakota where he settled. Within a year and a half, he had established himself in the town, and opened a law practice. In December 1881 he married Christine Corse in Racine, and they had seven children. He was a Mason and member of the Independent Order of Odd Fellows.

== Political career ==
During his time in Casselton, Pollock alternatively served as the city attorney and mayor. He was also a member of the 1889 constitutional convention that drafted the North Dakota Constitution. In 1891, Governor John Burke appointed him to the commission tasked with compiling the new state's laws. He also served as state attorney for Cass County from 1893 to 1897. In 1897, he moved to Fargo where he reestablished his law practice.

In 1900, he was elected as a Republican to the North Dakota House of Representatives and selected by the members of that body as its speaker. He represented Fargo in the 9th legislative district. Pollock was a supporter of women's suffrage and drafted the 1917 bill that gave limited suffrage to women in North Dakota.

Pollock died October 19, 1920, at the age of 65.
