= Enos Stutsman =

American politician

Enos Stutsman (born in what is now Fayette County, Indiana, February 14, 1826; died Pembina, Dakota Territory, January 24, 1874) was an American lawyer, politician, government official, and land speculator.

== Early life ==
Stutsman was born to a frontier family of German ancestry; his grandfather Jacob had settled in Pennsylvania in 1728, and his father Nicholas was living in Indiana at the time of his birth, but soon moved west. Stutsman's life on the frontier was particularly remarkable because he was born with only stubs of legs – some sources speculate that he had phocomelia – and reportedly moved around using crutches and wagons.

In 1836 the family moved to Coles County, Illinois, near the home of Abraham Lincoln's father, and Stutsman was educated there. From age 17 to 21 he taught school. In 1847 he was elected county recorder, and in 1849 clerk of the court. During this time he studied for the bar and was admitted in 1851.

In 1855 he moved, first to Des Moines, Iowa, and then to Sioux City, engaging in law, chiefly regarding land rights.

== Career ==
In 1858 Stutsman moved to the frontier settlement of Yankton (now in South Dakota) to supervise the laying out of a townsite for the Yankton Land and Town Company, which claimed the land in the area. These claims were eventually invalidated. Stutsman continued to live in Yankton, where he was the only lawyer. He claimed squatter's rights on land near Yankton, and worked for the creation of Dakota Territory. When it was established, Stutsman was elected in 1862 to the first territorial legislature, and he was instrumental in establishing Yankton as the capital of the new territory and in framing the first set of laws and statutes. In the second session of the legislature he was elected president of the council.

Formerly a Democrat, in 1863 Stutsman was re-elected as a Republican, and again in 1865. In 1866 he resigned to accept an appointment as a treasury agent. His work took him to Pembina, where he established a residence. In 1867 and 1868 he was again elected to the legislature, from Pembina, and was elected speaker in 1867. In 1870 he became a government land agent, based at Pembina. He served one more term in the legislature in 1872–3.

In 1868 Stutsman introduced a bill to give women the right to vote in Dakota Territory; this is believed to be the first such bill introduced in the United States. It passed the House, but failed in the upper chamber, the council.

In 1869 and 1870 Stutsman and others in Pembina promoted the idea of annexing the Red River Colony (now Manitoba). Stutsman visited Louis Riel a number of times, but failed to convince him of the advantages of American annexation. Stutsman's biased reports on events in the Colony were reported in American and Canadian newspapers.

Stutsman never married. Following his death in early 1874 he was buried in Floyd Cemetery in Sioux City. Stutsman County, North Dakota is named in his honor, and the main road through Pembina is named Stutsman Street.

== Colorful stories ==
There were many stories told about colorful incidents in Stutsman's life; some of these may be true.

- That he lost the townsite of Pembina in a poker game. (This one seems pretty dubious, given the number of errors in their information on Stutsman.)
- That he had a food fight with a fellow legislator.
- That Stutsman was the best shot in the Territory. That Stutsman and merchant Downer Bramble nearly had a face-off with pistols over a bottle of pepper sauce that Bramble threw at him.
- That he was a friend of Abraham Lincoln.
