= Elizabeth Preston Anderson =

American suffragist and temperance worker

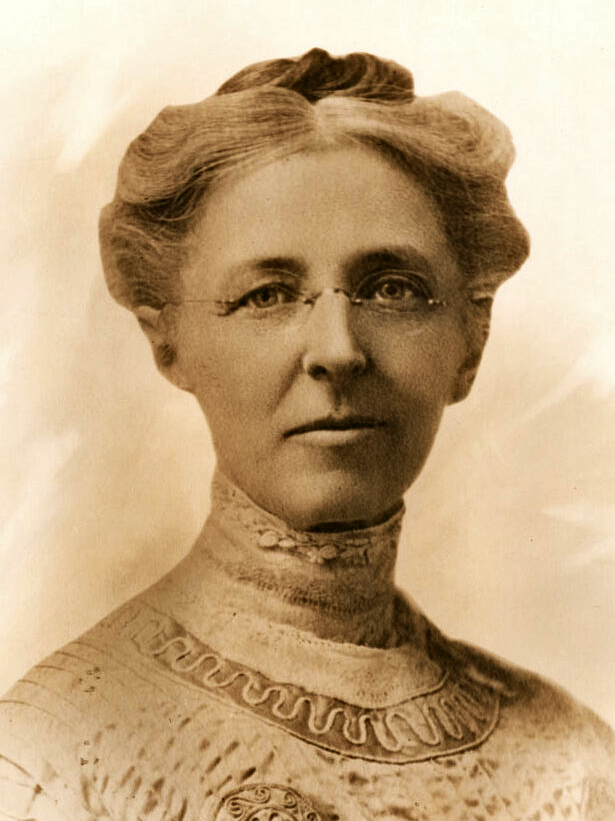
- Born: Elizabeth Stanton Preston; April 27, 1861; Decatur, Indiana
- Died: November 30, 1954 (aged 93); Miles City, Montana
- Known for: President, North Dakota State Woman's Christian Temperance Union

Elizabeth Preston Anderson (April 27, 1861 – November 30, 1954) was an American suffragist and temperance worker. She was a North Dakota advocate of temperance and later an advocate of women's suffrage.

== Biography ==
Anderson née Preston was born on April 27, 1861, in Decatur, Indiana. She attended DePauw University, Taylor University, and the University of Minnesota. She was a member of Kappa Alpha Theta. As a young woman she was a teacher in the north of the Dakota Territory. At that time, she was prescribed medicine containing alcohol and became dependent on the substance. She soon stopped taking the medicine and became an advocate of temperance, specifically warning students of the evils of alcohol.

In 1889, she joined the Woman's Christian Temperance Union (WCTU). Preston served as president of the North Dakota chapter of the WCTU for almost two decades. Through the WCTU Preston became interested in the Votes for Women's League.

In 1901, she married the Methodist minister James Anderson, a widower with 4 children.

Preston died in on November 30, 1954, in Miles City, Montana.

In 2020 a historical marker honoring her was placed at the court house in Valley City, North Dakota. Her papers are in the Institute for Regional Studies & University Archives at North Dakota State University.
