= List of Montana suffragists =

This is a list of Montana suffragists, suffrage groups and others associated with the cause of women's suffrage in Montana.

== Groups ==
- Equal Suffrage Party, formed in 1897.
- Bozeman Equal Suffrage Club, documented in 1895.
- Helena Business Women's Suffrage Club.
- Helena Equal Suffrage Club.
- Missoula Teachers' Suffrage Committee.
- Montana Equal Suffrage Association (MESA), created in 1912.
- Montana Men's Equal Suffrage League.
- Montana Woman's Suffrage Association (MWSA), formed in 1895.
- Women's Christian Temperance Union (WCTU).

== Suffragists ==
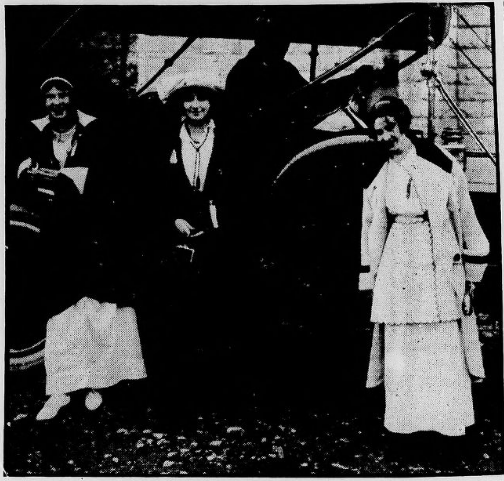
Group of Butte Suffragists in 1914. Left to right: Alice Schwegel, Mary Murphy and Katherine Sullivan

- Lillian Agnew (Great Falls).
- Mary Long Alderson.
- Mabel E. Staats (Bozeman).
- Mary B. Atwater.
- Ida Auerbach.
- Edith Clinch.
- Helen P. Clarke.
- Eva Warren Collier (Bedford).
- Ota E. Cummings (Billings).
- Maria M. Dean (Helena).
- Ella Knowles Haskell (Helena).
- Maggie Smith Hathaway (Ravalli County).
- Hazel Hunkins (Billings).
- Emma Ingalls (Flathead County).
- Grace Rankin Kinney.
- Mary Alderson Long.
- Clara McAdow (Fergus County).
- Mary E. O'Neill (Butte).
- Martha Edgerton Rolfe Plassmann (Great Falls).
- Jeannette Rankin (Missoula County).
- Wellington D. Rankin.
- Margaret Jane Steele Rozsa.
- Harriet P. Sanders.
- Sarepta Sanders (Helena).
- Mittie L. Shoup (Missoula).
- Gertrude Sylvester.
- Jessie Thompson (Bozeman).
- Clara B. Tower.
- Josephine Trigg (Great Falls).
- Elizabeth Donohue Vaughn (Great Falls).
- Mary C. Wheeler (Helena).
- Belle Fligelman Winestine (Helena).

=== Politicians supporting women's suffrage ===
- Joseph Burt Annin.
- Peter Breen.
- William A. Clark.
- John S. Huseby.
- Hiram Knowles.
- Perry McAdow (Fergus County).
- Wellington Rankin.
- Francis E. Sargeant.

== Publications ==
- The Suffrage Daily News, published in 1914 in Helena.
- Woman's Voice, published on suffrage in 1913.

== Suffragists campaigning in Montana ==
- Henry Blackwell.
- Kathryn Blake.
- Carrie Chapman Catt.
- Ida Craft.
- Emma Smith DeVoe.
- Laura A. Gregg.
- Mary Garrett Hay.
- Margaret Hinchey.
- Rosalie Jones.
- Harriet Burton Laidlaw.
- James Lees Laidlaw.
- Gail Laughlin.
- Anna Howard Shaw.
- Frances Willard.

== Anti-suffragists ==
Groups

- Montana Association Opposed to Woman Suffrage, formed in summer of 1914.
- Travel Club of Great Falls.

Politicians opposing women's suffrage

- Allen Joy.
- Martin Maginnis.
- George L. Ramsey (Gallatin County).
- Joseph K. Toole.

== See also ==
- Timeline of women's suffrage in Montana
- Women's suffrage in Montana
- Women's suffrage in the United States
