= Timeline of women's suffrage in Montana =

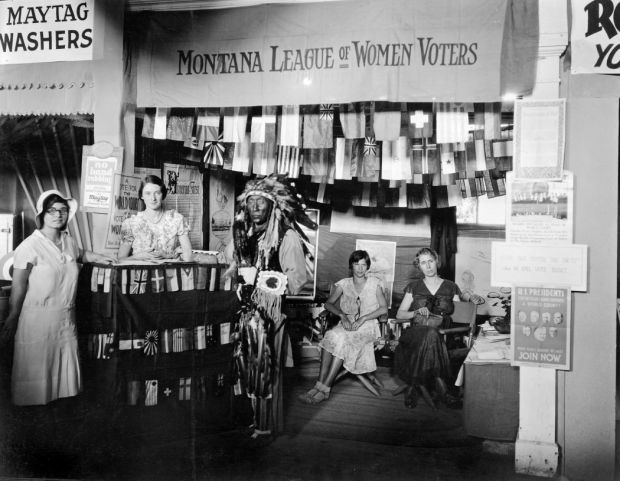
Chief Eagle Cap signs a petition at the Montana League of Women Voters booth at the Montana State Fair in Helena

This is a timeline of women's suffrage in Montana. The fight for women's suffrage in Montana started earlier, before even Montana became a state. In 1887, women gained the right to vote in school board elections and on tax issues. In the years that followed, women battled for full, equal suffrage, which culminated in a year-long campaign in 1914 when they became one of eleven states with equal voting rights for most women. Montana ratified the Nineteenth Amendment on August 2, 1919 and was the thirteenth state to ratify. Native American women voters did not have equal rights to vote until 1924.

== 19th century ==
=== 1880s ===
1883

- First women's suffrage speech is given in Montana by Frances Willard.

1884

- Women's suffrage is proposed during the state constitutional convention by Judge W. J. Stephens of Missoula, but it is not accepted.

1887

- Clara McAdow requests aid for women's suffrage organization from suffragists in the east of the United States.
- March 8: Women gain the right to vote in school board elections in their own districts.

1889

- Women's suffrage is proposed at the Montana State Constitutional Convention.
- Petitions to the convention for women's suffrage came from Jefferson County and Madison County.

=== 1890s ===
1890

- Women's suffrage club formed in Helena.

1895

- May: Emma Smith DeVoe comes to Montana to organize chapters of the National American Woman Suffrage Association (NAWSA).
- September: A suffrage convention is held in Helena with Carrie Chapman Catt as the speaker.
- October 11: The Bozeman Equal Suffrage Club was reported in The New Issue.
- November 30: Mabel E. Staats was elected treasurer of the Bozeman Equal Suffrage Club, succeeding Josie Miles.
- The Montana Woman's Suffrage Association (MWSA) is formed.
- A women's suffrage bill for a constitutional amendment is proposed in the State House but fails in the Senate.

1896

- DeVoe returns to Montana to continue organizing clubs and getting more women interested in suffrage.
- November: MWSA holds their annual convention in Butte.
- November 20: Ella Knowles Haskell becomes the president of MWSA.

1897

- November: MWSA holds their annual convention in Helena.
- Formation of an Equal Suffrage Party.

1898

- February 16: Haskell speaks at the National American Woman Suffrage Association (NAWSA) Conference held in Washington, D.C.
- November 1: MWSA holds their annual convention in Helena with Catt as the speaker.
- Suffragists ask all state legislative candidates to explain their positions on women's suffrage.

1899

- A women's suffrage bill was introduced to the state legislature through the lobbying of Mary B. Atwater, but it never makes it out of committee.
- October: MWSA convention is held in Helena with Catt and Mary Garrett Hay attending.

== 20th century ==
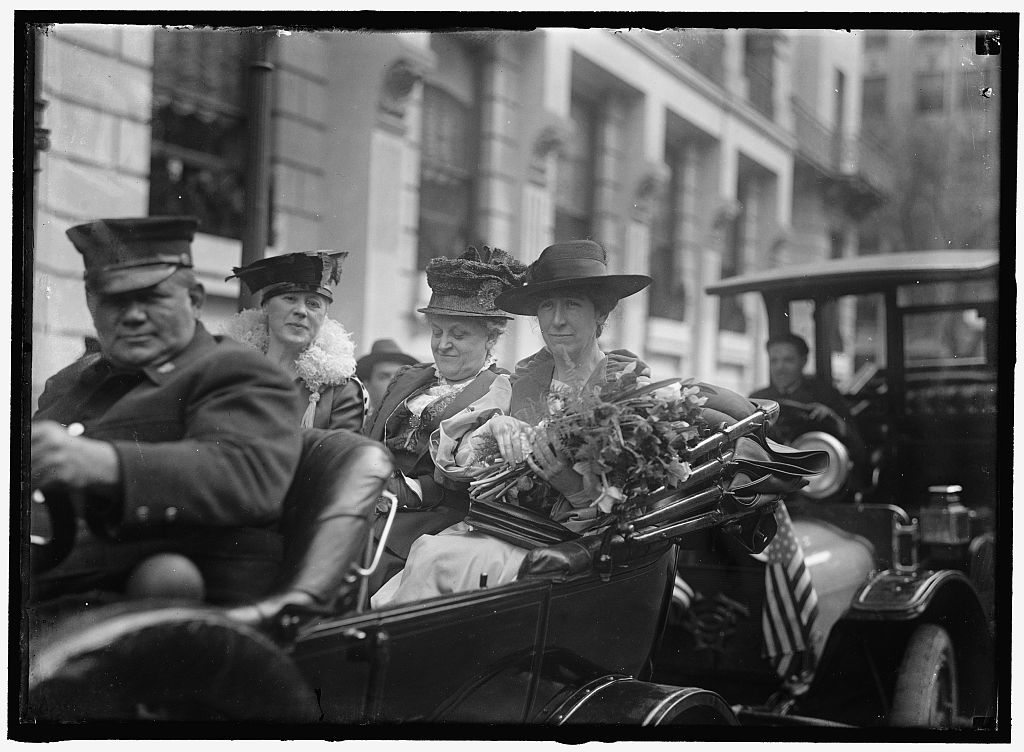
Jeannette Rankin, Carrie Chapman Catt and another suffragist.

=== 1900s ===
1900

- Fall: Helena lobby women Republican, Democratic and Populist party conventions to include a women's suffrage plank.

1902

- Carrie Chapman Catt returns to Montana and brings Gail Laughlin and Laura A. Gregg to reorganize suffrage groups.

1903

- A women's suffrage amendment bill is introduced in the Montana legislature, but it doesn't pass.

1905

- Another women's suffrage amendment bill is introduced in the legislature, but it again fails.

=== 1910s ===
1911

- Jeannette Rankin becomes the first woman to address the Montana Legislature when she speaks to the Senate on women's suffrage.
- Suffragists host a women's suffrage booth at the Montana State Fair.

1912

- The Montana Equal Suffrage Association (MESA) is created.
- Suffragists again host a women's suffrage booth at the Montana State Fair.

1913

- A women's suffrage bill passes in the Montana Legislature and is sent to the voters in 1914.
- Jeannette Rankin travels from Montana to Washington, D.C. by car, collecting signatures in support of women's suffrage along the way.
- October: The Montana WCTU decides to focus solely on women's suffrage for the next year.
- December: WCTU paper, Woman's Voice, starts publishing again.

1914

- The Suffrage Daily News is published in Helena.
- January: MESA opens headquarters in Butte.
- Spring: James Lees Laidlaw and Wellington D. Rankin found a Montana chapter of the National Men's Suffrage League.
- May 2: Governor Sam Stewart declares "Woman's Day" on May 2. A suffrage car parade held on Last Chance Gulch in Helena.
- June: Jeannette Rankin gives a speech at the meeting of the Montana Federation of Women's Clubs (MFWC) in Lewistown. MFWC came out in support of women's suffrage.
- September 24: The Montana State Fair has a women's suffrage booth.
- November 3: The women's suffrage amendment bill passed 41,302 to 37,588. Montana is now one of eleven states to give women the vote.

1915

- January: Suffragist meeting in Helena to discuss "intelligent use of the ballot." Women change the name of their suffrage groups to the Montana Good Government Association.

1919

- August 2: Montana ratifies the Nineteenth Amendment, becoming the thirteenth state to ratify.

=== 1920s ===
1924

- The Indian Citizenship Act is passed, providing rights for Native Americans to vote in Montana.

== See also ==
- List of Montana suffragists
- Women's suffrage in Montana
- Women's suffrage in states of the United States
- Women's suffrage in the United States
