= Liz Berry =

Liz Berry may refer to:

- Liz Berry (poet) (born 1980), British poet
- Liz Berry (politician) (born c.1983), Washington state representative

== See also ==
- Elizabeth Williams Berry (1854–1969), Australian-born jockey
