= Montana State Fair =

Various Montana State Fairs have been held in different Montana locations:

- Montana State Fairgrounds Racetrack, Helena, site of territorial and state fairs in Montana in the early 1900s
- Montana ExpoPark, Great Falls, beginning in the 1930s and continuing to use the title "Montana State Fair" today
- MetraPark, Billings, which hosts Montanafair, also called a "State Fair"
