= Warren–Prentis Historic District =

Historic district in Michigan, United States

- U.S. National Register of Historic Places
- U.S. Historic district
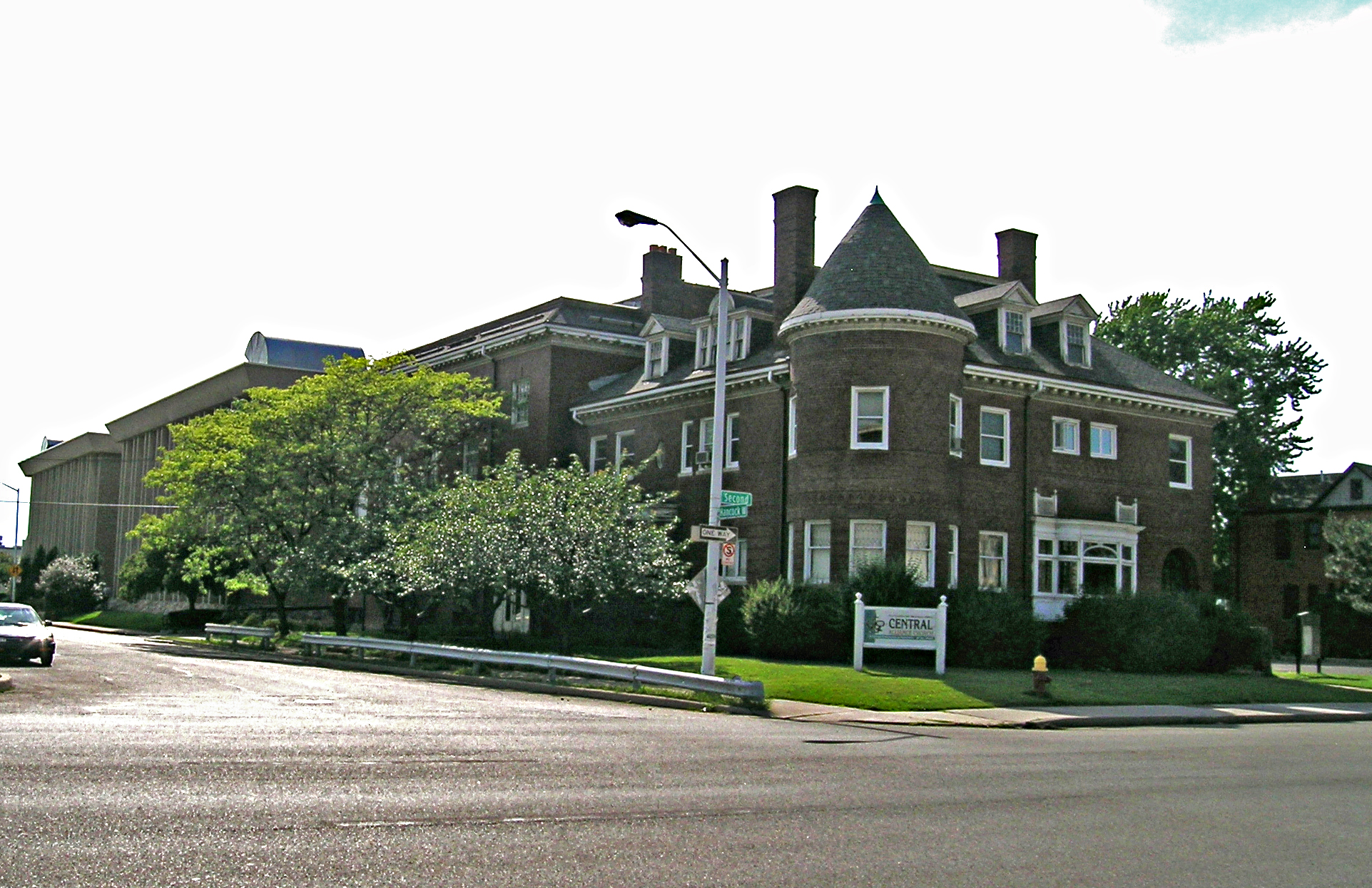
- Corner of Second and Hancock
- Interactive map
- Location: Detroit, Michigan, U.S.
- Coordinates: 42°21′15″N 83°4′4″W
- Architect: Multiple
- Architectural style: Tudor Revival, Classical Revival, Colonial Revival
- MPS: Cass Farm MPS
- NRHP reference No.: 97001477
- Added to NRHP: December 01, 1997

The Warren–Prentis Historic District is a historic district in Detroit, Michigan, including the east–west streets of Prentis, Forest, Hancock, and the south side of Warren, running from Woodward Avenue on the east to Third Avenue on the west. The district was listed on the National Register of Historic Places in 1997.

The district includes residential, commercial, institutional, religious and other buildings, and the majority of the pre-1930s building stock remains.

== History ==
The land included in the Warren–Prentis Historic District was originally the Park Lots, the Cass Farm, and the Jones/Crane Farm; these parcels were subdivided in the late 19th century. Due in part to the large lot sizes and the streetcar lines along Woodward and Third, the district became popular with upper-class Detroit businessmen and professionals moving away from downtown. A number of these citizens moved into the area in the period between 1880 and 1895, commissioning residences.

In the late 1880s, apartment living became more popular, and the construction of duplexes and small apartments increased while the construction of single-family homes dropped off. Commercial development in the area increased in the early 20th century, peaking in the years between World War I and the Great Depression.

The area declined during the Depression, as the larger single-family homes became too costly to keep up. These homes were divided into rental units, and the area was fully utilized during the boom years of World War II. The area again began declining after the war, but in the 1990s signs of revival have been evident, as the nearby Wayne State University and the Detroit Medical Center draw people to the area.

== Structures ==
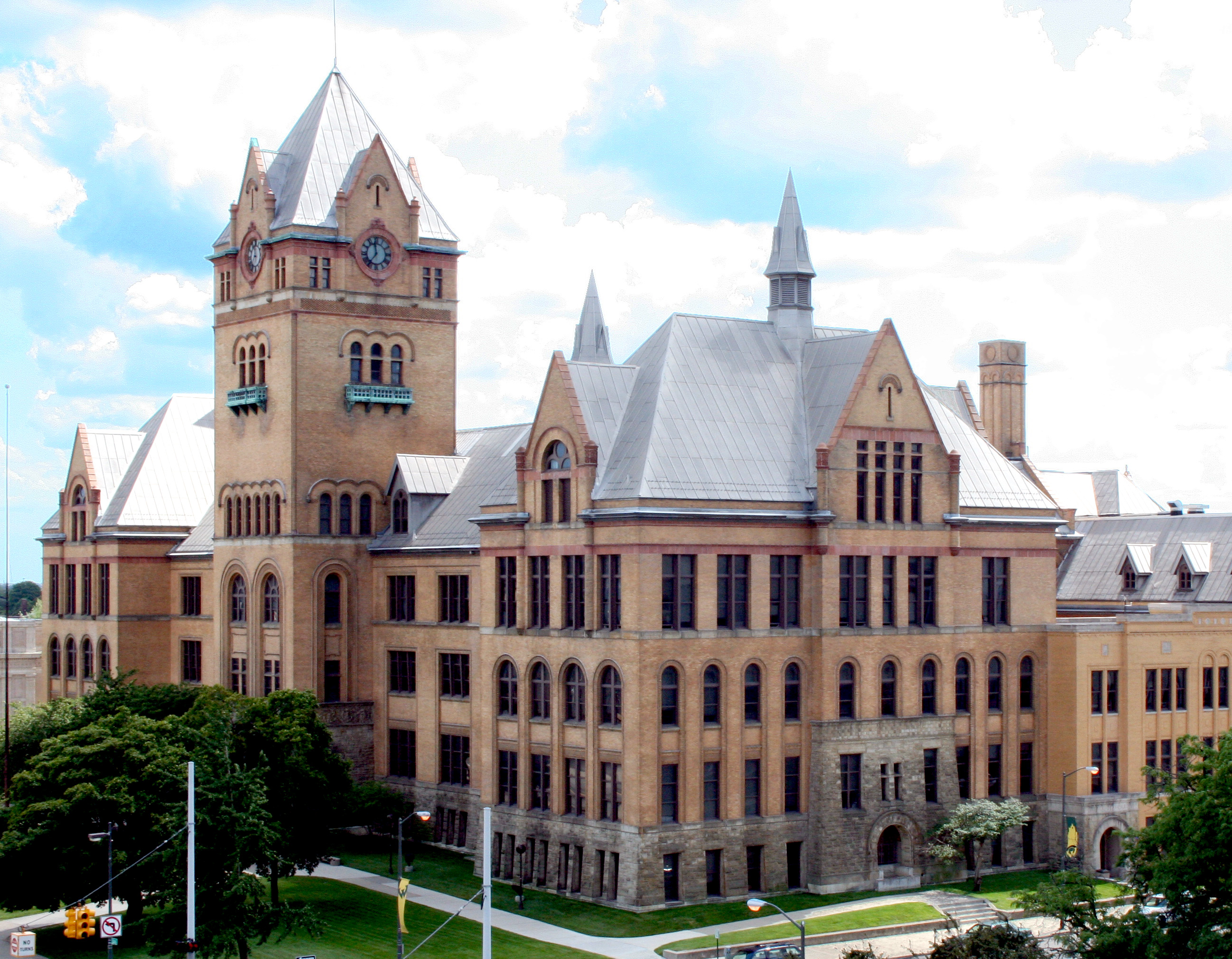
Old Main

There are 108 individual historic structures in the Warren–Prentis Historic District. These include some buildings of individual historical significance:

- Perry McAdow House (4605 Cass Avenue, at Prentis)
- William C. Boydell House (4614 Cass Avenue, at Prentis)
- Thompson Home (4756 Cass Avenue, at Hancock)
- George W. Loomer House (71 W. Hancock Avenue)
- Mulford T. Hunter House (77 W. Hancock Avenue)
- Mackenzie House (4735 Cass Avenue)
- Hilberry Theatre (4743 Cass Avenue, at Hancock)
- Central High School (Old Main) (4841 Cass Avenue, at Hancock)

== Gallery ==
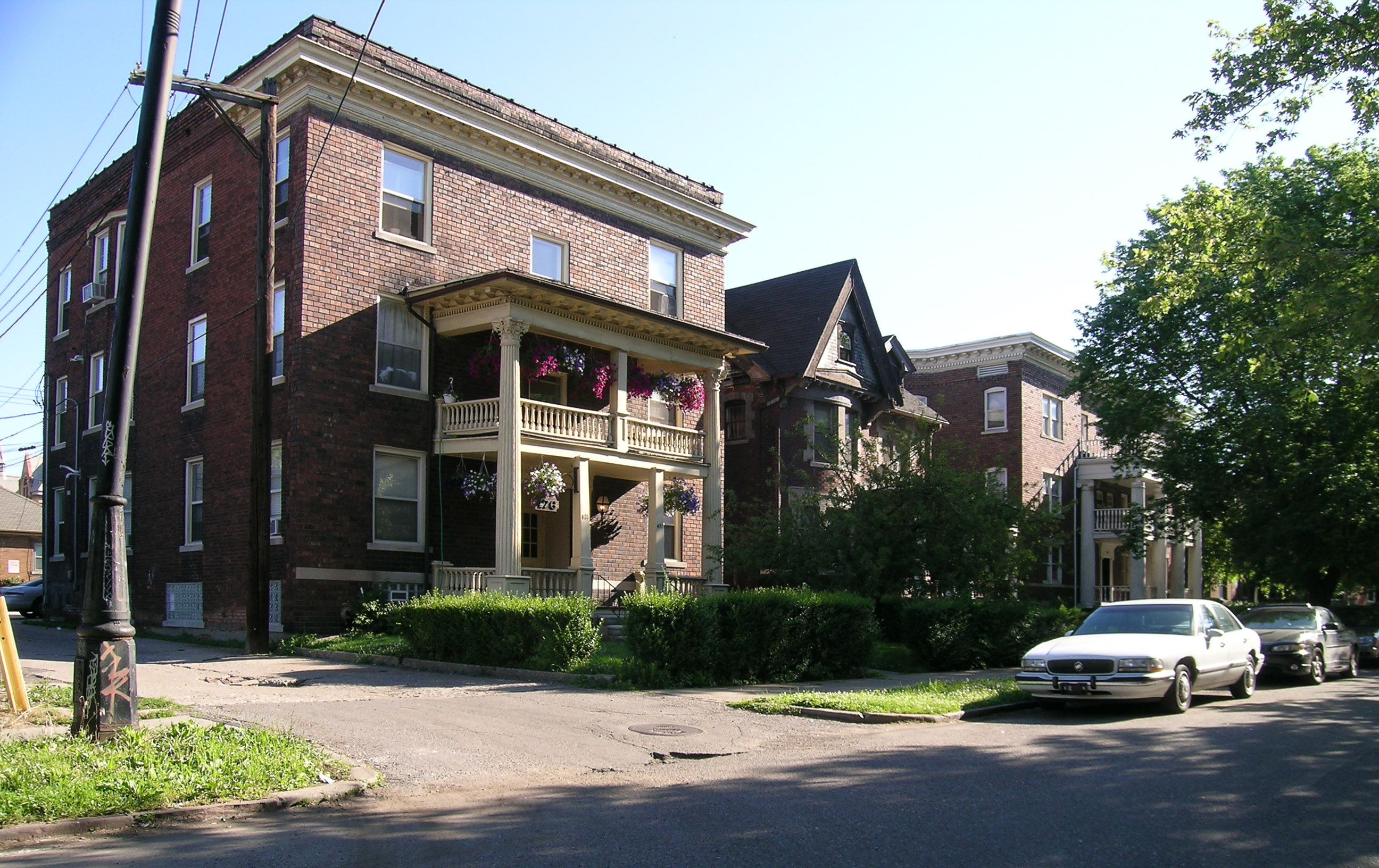
Prentis Street between Second and Cass, showing single-family homes and small apartments

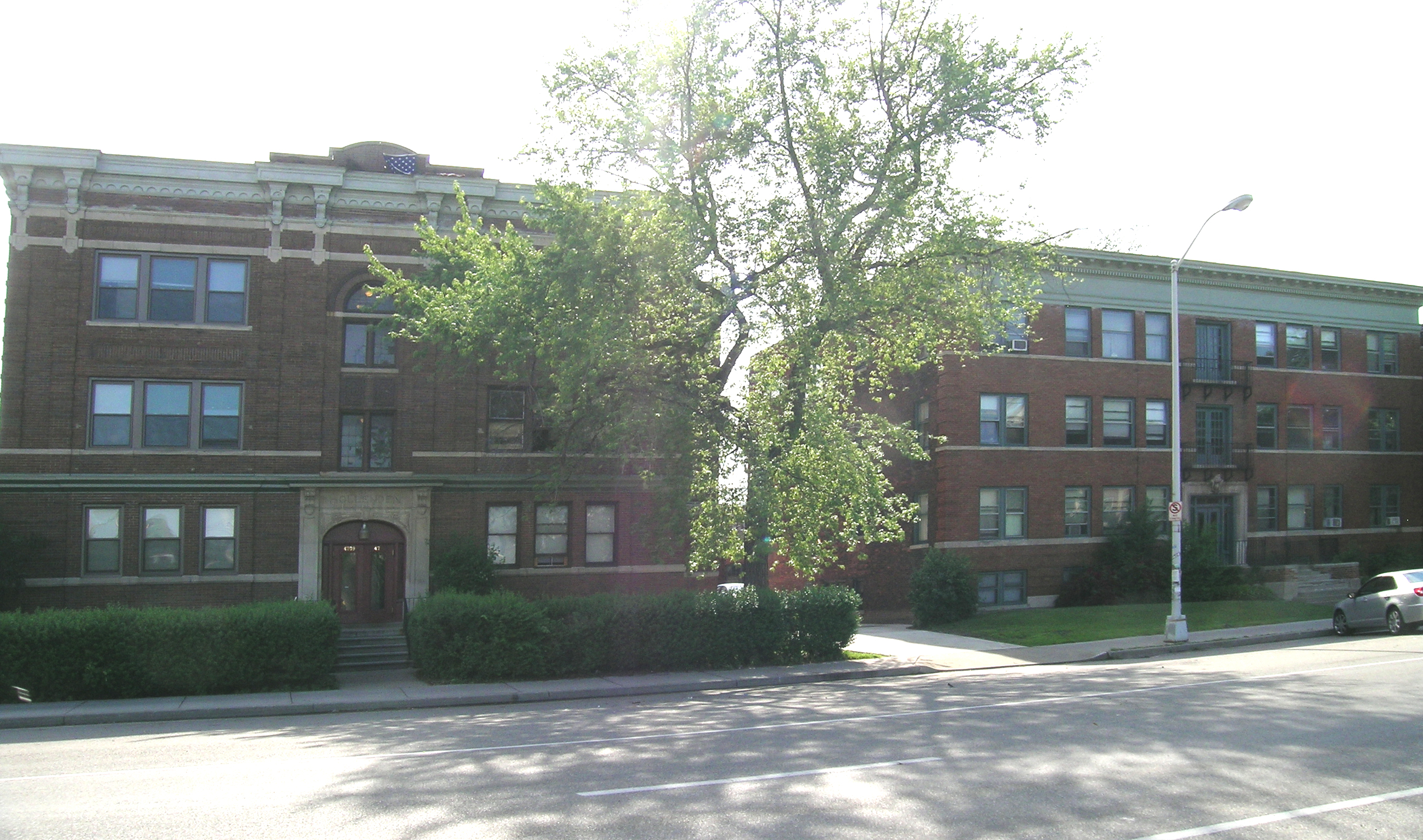
Apartments on Second and Forest in the Warren–Prentis Historic District

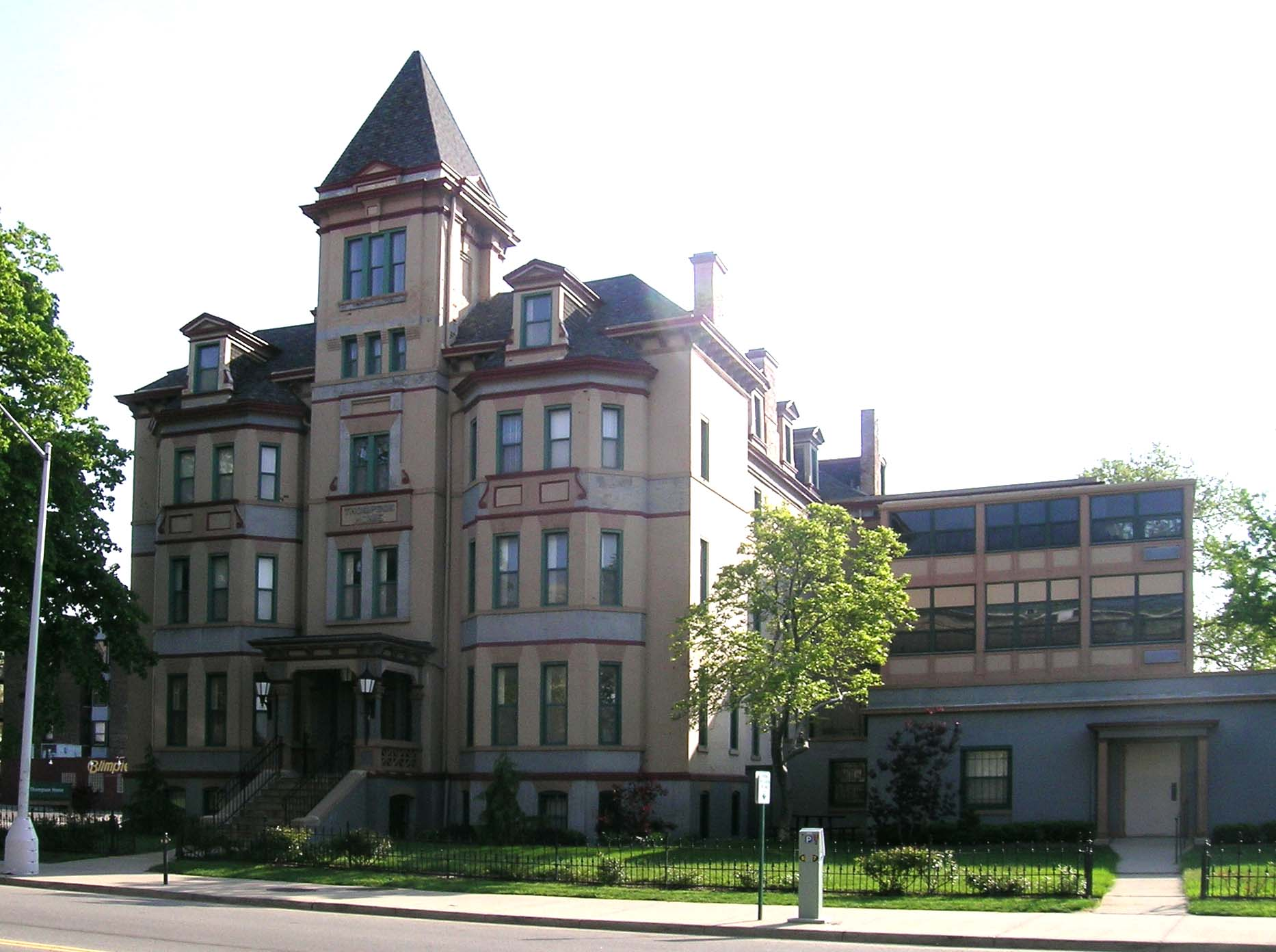
Thompson Home

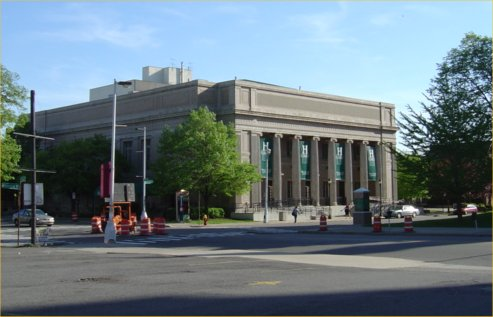
Hilberry Theatre
