= William C. Boydell House =

Historic house in Michigan, United States

- U.S. National Register of Historic Places
- U.S. Historic district – Contributing property
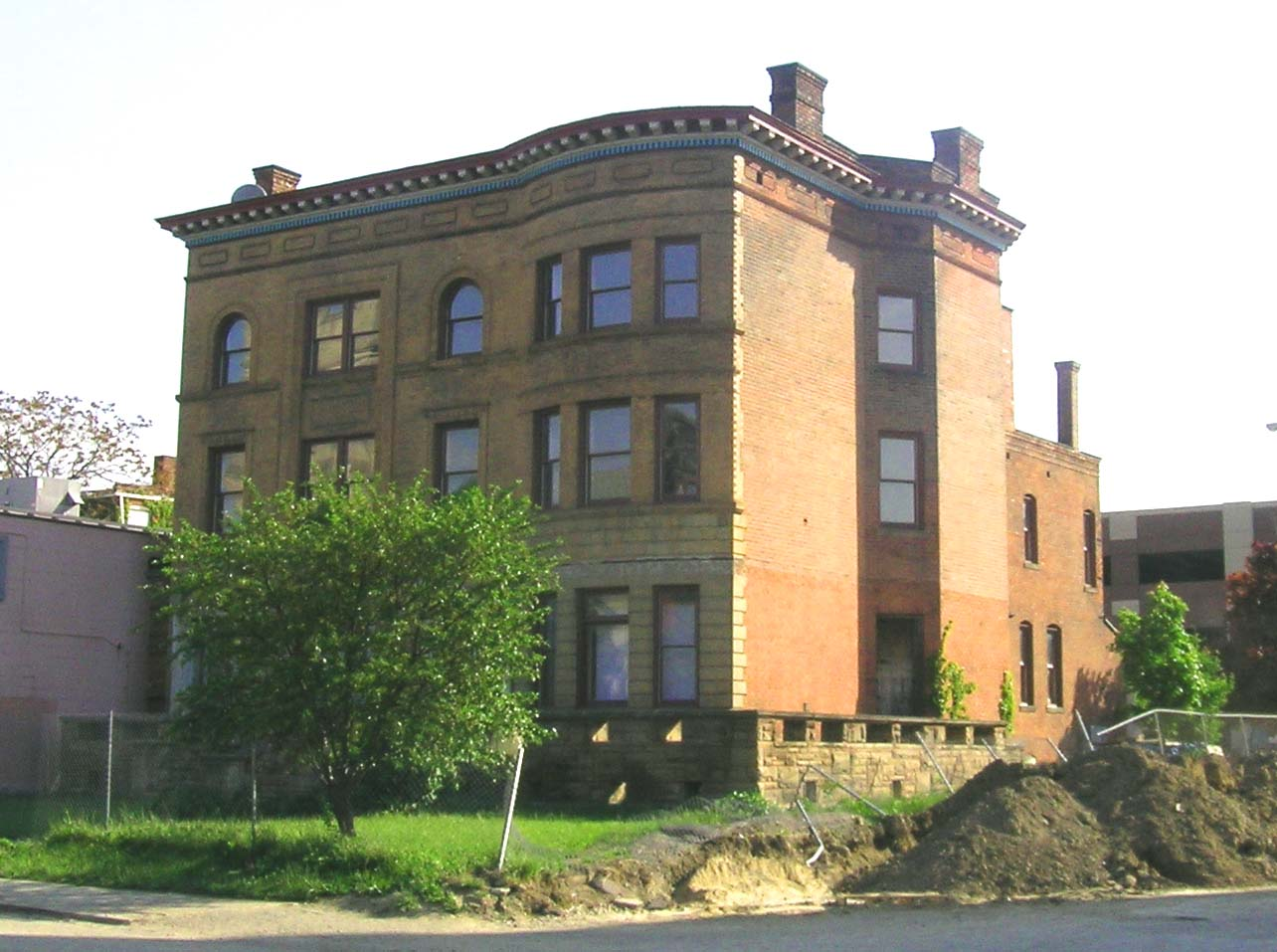
- Interactive map
- Location: 4614 Cass Avenue; Detroit, Michigan
- Coordinates: 42°21′13″N 83°3′53″W
- Built: 1895
- Architect: Almon Clother Varney
- Architectural style: Beaux-Arts
- Part of: Warren-Prentis Historic District (ID97001477)
- NRHP reference No.: 82002892

Significant dates
- Added to NRHP: March 19, 1982
- Designated CP: December 01, 1997

The William C. Boydell House is a double house located at 4614 Cass Avenue in Midtown Detroit, Michigan. It was listed on the National Register of Historic Places in 1982.

== History ==
William C. Boydell was born in 1849 in Staffordshire, England. His parents soon emigrated to London, Ontario, and five years later moved to Detroit, where Boydell attended school. In 1865 he began work as a clerk in the paint works of James H. Worcester. In 1867 William and his older brother John began their own firm, the Boydell Brothers White Lead and Color Company, with William as vice-president. The firm was owned by the Boydell family until 1959.

In 1895, William Boydell constructed this double house, designed by Almon Clother Varney as his home. He lived there until his death in 1902.

== Architecture ==
The William C. Boydell House is a three-story brick and limestone Beaux-Arts double house with a hip roof, built to resemble a single-family home. The front façade is lined with a pair of rock-faced terraces, and the front of the two units are unified in appearance by a brick frieze running under the eaves and banded limestone at the first story.

== See also ==
- Lancaster and Waumbek Apartments: other buildings designed by Almon Clother Varney
