= Margaret Jane Steele Rozsa =

American politician

Margaret J. Rozsa
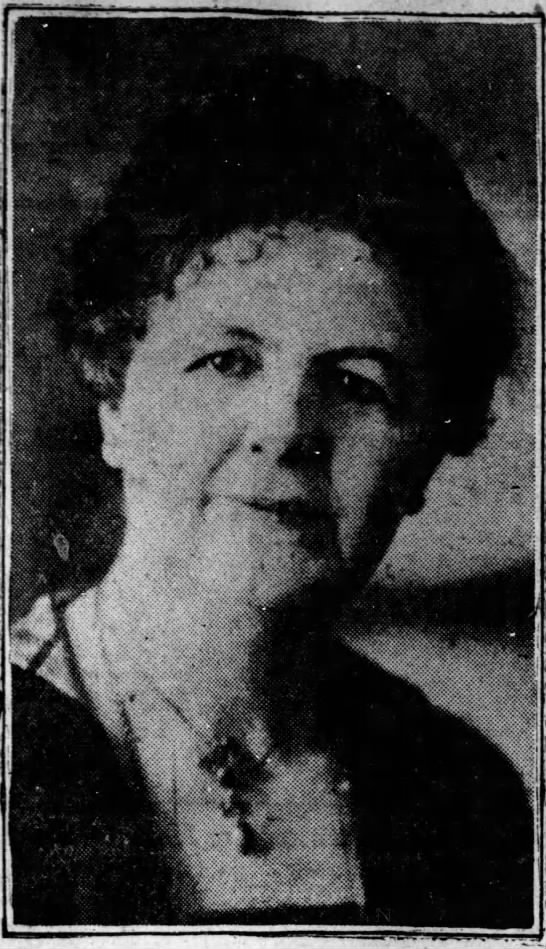
- Born: Margaret Jane Steele; March 3, 1867; Logan, Utah
- Died: October 5, 1949 (aged 82); Oakland, California
- Spouse: Joseph William Rozsa (1864-1942)
- Parent(s): Lemuel Steele (1846-1924) and Ruth Matilda (Foster) Steele (1849-1931)

Margaret Jane Steele Rozsa (March 3, 1867 – October 5, 1949) was an American government official in Butte, Montana who became the first female prohibition investigator for the United States in 1921. A longtime suffragist and women's rights advocate, she was also active in the women's club movement, serving as a member of the Good Government Club, Housewives League, Liberal Culture Club, and the Methodist Women's Missionary Society.

== Formative years ==
Born in Logan, Utah on March 3, 1867, Margaret Jane Steele was a daughter of Lemuel Steele (1846–1924) and Iowa native, Ruth Matilda (Foster) Steele (1849–1931). She was reared in Logan with her siblings: Elizabeth Steele (1871–1958), who later wed Andrew J. Reese; Lemuel William Steele, Jr. (1874–1937); George Lee Steele (1876–1884); and David Foster Steele (1879–1964).

Circa 1890, she wed blacksmith Joseph William Rozsa (1864–1942). Their daughters Wilma (born in 1894) and Ruth Maxine Rozsa (1899–1967), were both born in Butte.

== Women's suffrage and other political activities ==
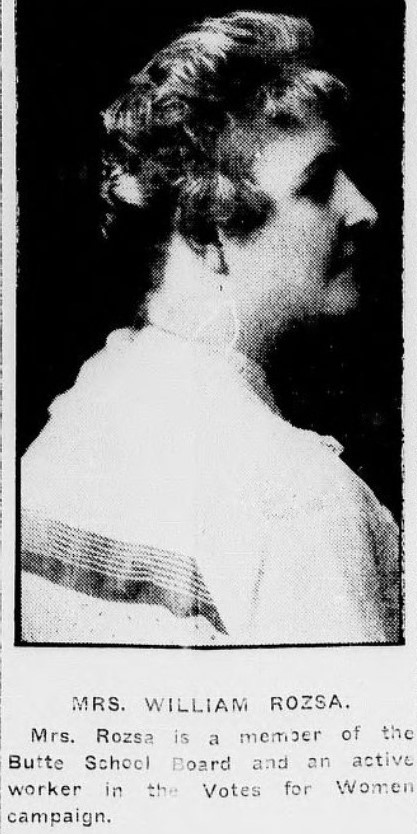
Public domain image of Margaret Jane (Steele) Rozsa, Butte School Board member, from "The Suffrage Daily News" (Montana State Fair edition), Helena, Montana, September 26, 1914, p. 2.

A member of the school board in Butte in 1914, Margaret Rozsa was described in The Suffrage Daily News as "one of the prominent state suffrage workers" who would be marching in the women's suffrage parade in Helena on Friday evening, September 25, 1914. Other prominent suffragists slated to march in the parade, which was being held in conjunction with the Montana State Fair that year, were Dr. Anna Howard Shaw, president of the National American Woman Suffrage Association, and Jeannette Rankin, who would later become the first woman elected to the U.S. House of Representatives. Rozsa was also slated to speak at events related to the march.

Seeking a more active role in local politics, she ran for a seat on the Silver Bow County Commission in 1916, but lost that bid.

Active in the Good Government Club, an amalgam of state-wide suffrage organizations that joined together following the 1914 passage of women's suffrage in Montana to collaborate further on other key women's rights issues, she became the club's president in January 1917, and immediately joined fellow club members in lobbying the state legislature to appropriate the funds necessary to create an industrial home for girls, enact a measure that would require garnishment of the wages men of who deserted their wives and children in order to provide financial support to those women and children, fund the assessment of living conditions at the home for children with mental illness and learning disabilities to ensure that those children were receiving adequate care, increase the amounts awarded to women via mothers' pensions, and ensure that existing laws were being enforced before passing new legislation.

The next month, she delivered the keynote address, "Some Needed Legislation," to the Women's Missionary Society chapter of the Lowell Avenue United Methodist Church. That spring, she served on the Butte Chamber of Commerce's Constitution and Bylaws Committee.

She then sought, and obtained a position in 1919 that would change not only her quality of life, but that of Butte's citizens, becoming a food inspector in that city. In July of that year, she alleged that certain government officials were complicit in keeping the cost of living artificially high for city residents, and began actively working for change. According to the July 26 edition of the Great Falls Daily Tribune and the July 30 edition of The River Press:

"Charges of bribery, references to Montana's food administration as a 'fake' and the allegation by witnesses that Butte's food inspector was dismissed because he enforced the law, together with the announcement of master bakers of a 25 percent increase effective at once in the price of bread, were features today of the Montana efficiency commission into the cost of living in Butte.

Dr. W. C. Matthews, former city physician, testified that Butte commission men permit carloads of fruit to spoil in order to maintain prices....

Mrs. Margaret Rosza [sic] said that commission men never permit prices to slump and that some cars of food labeled 'perishable' have been standing on the tracks since July 7. She said a city food inspector was discharged because he tried to enforce the law."

In August 1919, her lobbying efforts at the state level received significant coverage in The Butte Daily Bulletin, which reported she had formed the opinion, after a week in Helena, that "the legislators of Montana are not knaves but merely well-intentioned children who make many puerile blunders." In addition to lobbying state legislators to reduce the high cost of living for Montana residents, she "was instrumental in getting senate bill No. 19 through the legislature," which ensured that 199 tubercular soldiers who had served in World War I would be given "preference of entry to the Galen hospital," and that the legislature would authorize $20,000 in state funds to build additional dormitories at the hospital to make that care possible since hospital admissions were already at capacity.

"The bill passed the senate, but in the house the $20,000 appropriation was cut off.... Mrs. Rozsa, at the request of Mrs. Morris of Helena, who is in charge of the Red Cross at the capital, took the matter up with Representative Higgins, chairman of the finance committee and floor leader. He explained the house had cut off the appropriation, purely from a heedless misapprehension of the situation, due to lack of attention and study.... But at Mrs. Rozsa's solicitation, the Honorable Higgins recalled senate bill No. 19 and the house members tacked the $20,000 appropriation back on and voted it through.

"Mrs. Rozsa was glad to see the governor's pet measure, appointing a state sheriff to enforce prohibition, defeated. The lady thinks we already have enough of those fellows around....

As for the food bills in which Mrs. Rozsa was so interested ... she says they finally went through in fine shape...."

In September 1919, she was quoted in The Butte Daily Bulletin as an advocate for the city's involvement in purchasing large quantities of food items wholesale in order to benefit members of the community:

"Mrs. Margaret Rosza [sic], city food inspector, declared that in her opinion the city market would not be at its greatest success until the city itself entered in the retailing business and authorized the market master to purchase food in carload lots and retail it at the market at cost, plus expense of handling....

'The profiteers cannot undersell the city and put it out of business, as they can the multiplicity of small dealers now on the market.

The city can purchase cheaply and sell cheaply, and the business at the market, instead of being divided among a number of small dealers, none of whose profits are adequate for success, would all go to the one dealer—the city—and in consequence of such concentration could be handled more economically and the saving conveyed to the public through the medium of lower prices.'"

That same month, The Anaconda Standard reported that she had inspected multiple bakeries across the city and found that, of the fifteen businesses she had visited, "only a few ... fell below the required weight of one pound," and that in several cases, "the weight of the loaves was found ... to be a few ounces above the requirement."

"Mrs. Rosza [sic] stated in explaining the purpose of the tests that it will be the purpose of the food department to acquaint the public as far as possible with the weights they are being offered as well as the sanitary condition of stores and plants."

The next month, she traveled to Ashton, Idaho in mid-October to attend a family reunion, which was held at the home of her brother, Lemuel. According to a newspaper report, 14 members of the family were present for the event, which also included a birthday party for her 79-year-old mother, Ruth M. Steele.

In November 1921, she was appointed as a special prohibition investigator for the federal government of the United States. Assigned to serve under the State of Montana's prohibition commissioner, O. H. P. Shelley, she was the first woman in the nation to be appointed to an investigative position with the prohibition commission. Her duties included the review of physicians' permits, as well as the inspection of drug stores and liquor shipments.

Her father, Lemuel Steele, widowed her mother in 1924. Seven years later, her mother, Ruth Matilda (Foster) Steele, died in Utah in August 1931, following a ten-week illness.

Sometime around 1940, Margaret Rozsa's daughter, Ruth, wed Frank Ferguson. Residing with her husband in the Los Angeles, California area at the time of the federal census in 1940, Margaret was widowed by him on October 28, 1942.

== Death and interment ==
Margaret J. (Steele) Rozsa died in Oakland, California, on October 5, 1949. She was buried next to her husband at the Forest Lawn Memorial Park in Glendale, California.

== See also ==
- National American Woman Suffrage Association
- Women's suffrage in Montana

== External resources ==
- "The Montana Suffrage Story," in "Women's History Matters." Helena, Montana: Montana Historical Society.
