= Mulford T. Hunter House =

Historic house in Michigan, United States

- U.S. National Register of Historic Places
- U.S. Historic district – Contributing property
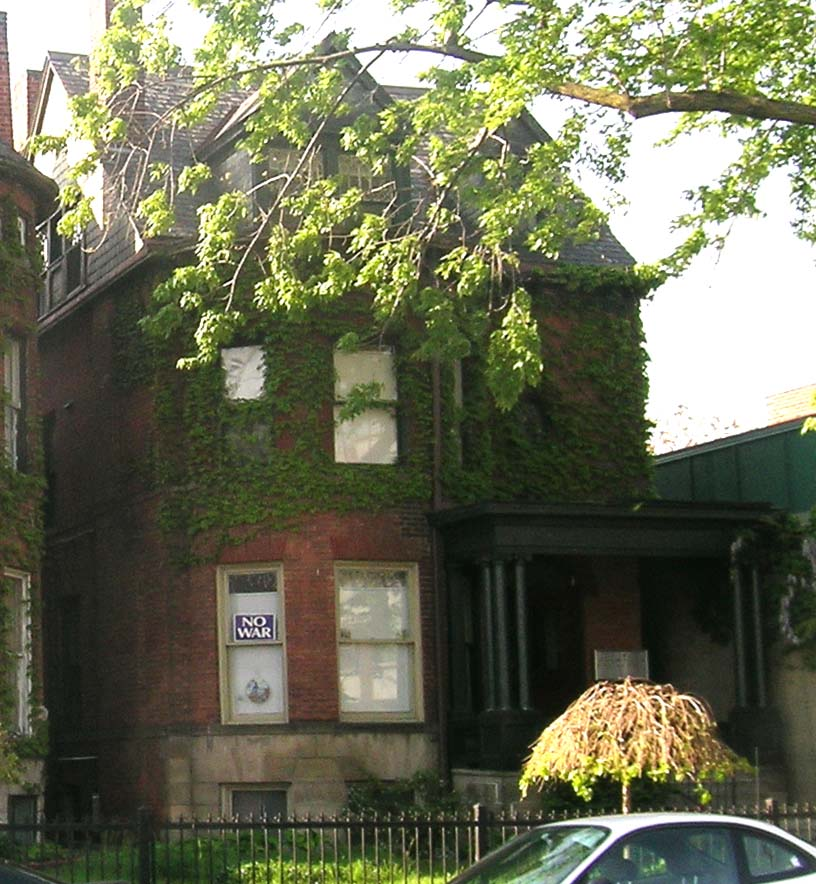

- Location within Michigan Location within the United States
- Interactive map
- Location: 77 West Hancock Street; Detroit, Michigan
- Coordinates: 42°21′19″N 83°3′53″W
- Built: 1894
- Architect: Donaldson & Meier
- Architectural style: Queen Anne
- Part of: Warren-Prentis Historic District (ID97001477)
- NRHP reference No.: 94000757

Significant dates
- Added to NRHP: July 22, 1994
- Designated CP: December 01, 1997

The Mulford T. Hunter House is a private residence located at 77 West Hancock Street in Midtown Detroit, Michigan. It was listed on the National Register of Historic Places on July 22, 1994.

== History ==
Mulford Hunter was a captain of Great Lakes steamships, earning enough to become wealthy. In 1891, he purchased George W. Loomer House, and also acquired what was then an empty lot next door, where this house now stands. According to the May 27, 1894 edition of the Detroit Free Press, he commissioned the firm of Donaldson & Meier to design this house, and moved in that year. Hunter lived there with his daughter, his son-in-law and his grandchild, and afterward rented out the Loomer house. The ownership of both the Hunter House and the Loomer House passed from Hunter to his daughter, and then to his granddaughter Carolyn S. McGraw. In 1951, both houses were sold to Phila J. Draper and transformed into multi-unit apartment buildings. They continued to be operated as apartments through at least the 1990s, although under different ownership, but the exterior has not been changed. The owner in the 1990s was Edward Black.

== Architecture ==
This structure is a Queen Anne townhouse, one of the few remaining examples in the city of Detroit. The basement is built from large stones, elevating the red brick structure well off the ground. The front façade is asymmetric, with a dominating bay window on one side and a one-story porch on the other. The porch features Ionic columns atop raised pedestals, and the front door has an elliptical fanlight framed by a Syrian arch. Above the porch is an oval window, surrounded by decorative brickwork; other second story windows have similar decoration. Two dormers with leaded windows surmount the façade. The house is directly adjacent to the George W. Loomer House; the two are the only remaining buildings from the 19th century in what was at the time one of Detroit's most fashionable areas.
