= George W. Loomer House =

Historic house in Michigan, United States

- U.S. National Register of Historic Places
- U.S. Historic district – Contributing property
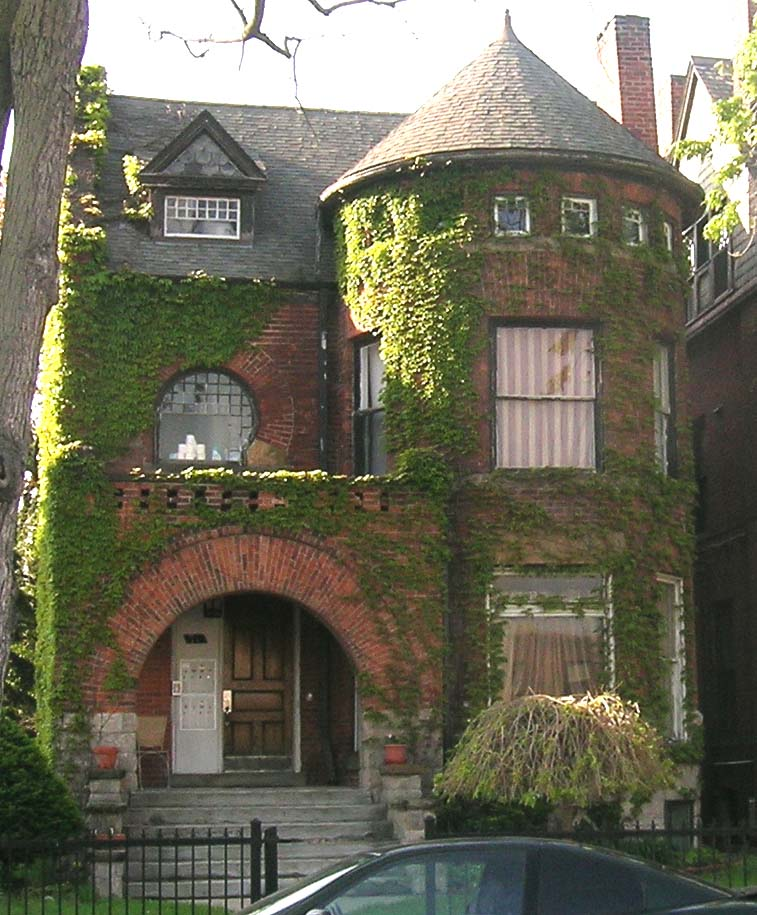
- Interactive map
- Location: 71 West Hancock St., Detroit, Michigan
- Coordinates: 42°21′20″N 83°3′52″W
- Built: 1888
- Architect: Almon C. Varney
- Architectural style: Richardsonian Romanesque
- Part of: Warren-Prentis Historic District (ID97001477)
- NRHP reference No.: 94000753

Significant dates
- Added to NRHP: July 22, 1994
- Designated CP: December 01, 1997

The George W. Loomer House is a private residence located at 71 West Hancock Street in Midtown Detroit, Michigan. It was listed on the National Register of Historic Places in 1994.

== History ==
This Richardsonian Romanesque structure was designed by architect Almon C. Varney in 1888 for George W. Loomer, a lumber dealer. The building originally had an insured value of $4,300, a sizeable sum in 1888. In 1891, retired steamboat captain Mulford T. Hunter purchased the house from Loomer, and also acquired what was then an empty lot next door. In 1893, he commissioned the construction of a house on the empty lot (now the Mulford T. Hunter House) and moved in the next year. He afterward rented out the Loomer house. The ownership of both the Hunter House and the Loomer House passed from Huner to his daughter, and then to his granddaughter Carolyn S. McGraw. In 1951, both houses were sold to Phila J. Draper and transformed into multi-unit apartment buildings. They continued to be operated as apartments through at least the 1990s, although under different ownership, but the exterior has not been changed. The owner in the 1990s was Edward Black. As of 2026, the houses were owned by a man named Akbar Noorbash. The units are mostly rented out to Wayne State University students and faculty. Apartment #3 at 71 W Hancock contains the casket window.

== Architecture ==
The exterior of this home features a two-story turret with a conical roof and an arched porch. The massive stone basement lifts the house a full meter into the air. The remainder of the house is constructed from masonry, much of it intricately laid. The porch supports an open balcony above, with a window overlooking the porch has an exaggerated rounded surround, and above that a gabled roof dormer. Belt courses beneath each line of the tower windows are constructed of stone, as are steps and the lintel above the central window in the first floor of the tower. Three windows are located on the basement, first, and second floor levels of the tower. Six small square windows are located on the third floor.

On the interior, the trim is all in golden oak. Much of the interior was removed upon conversion into apartments, but the main staircase remains intact.

The home is directly adjacent to the Mulford T. Hunter House; the two are the only remaining buildings from the 19th century in what was at the time one of Detroit's most fashionable areas.
