= Thompson Home =

Historic house in Michigan, United States

- U.S. National Register of Historic Places
- U.S. Historic district – Contributing property
- Michigan State Historic Site
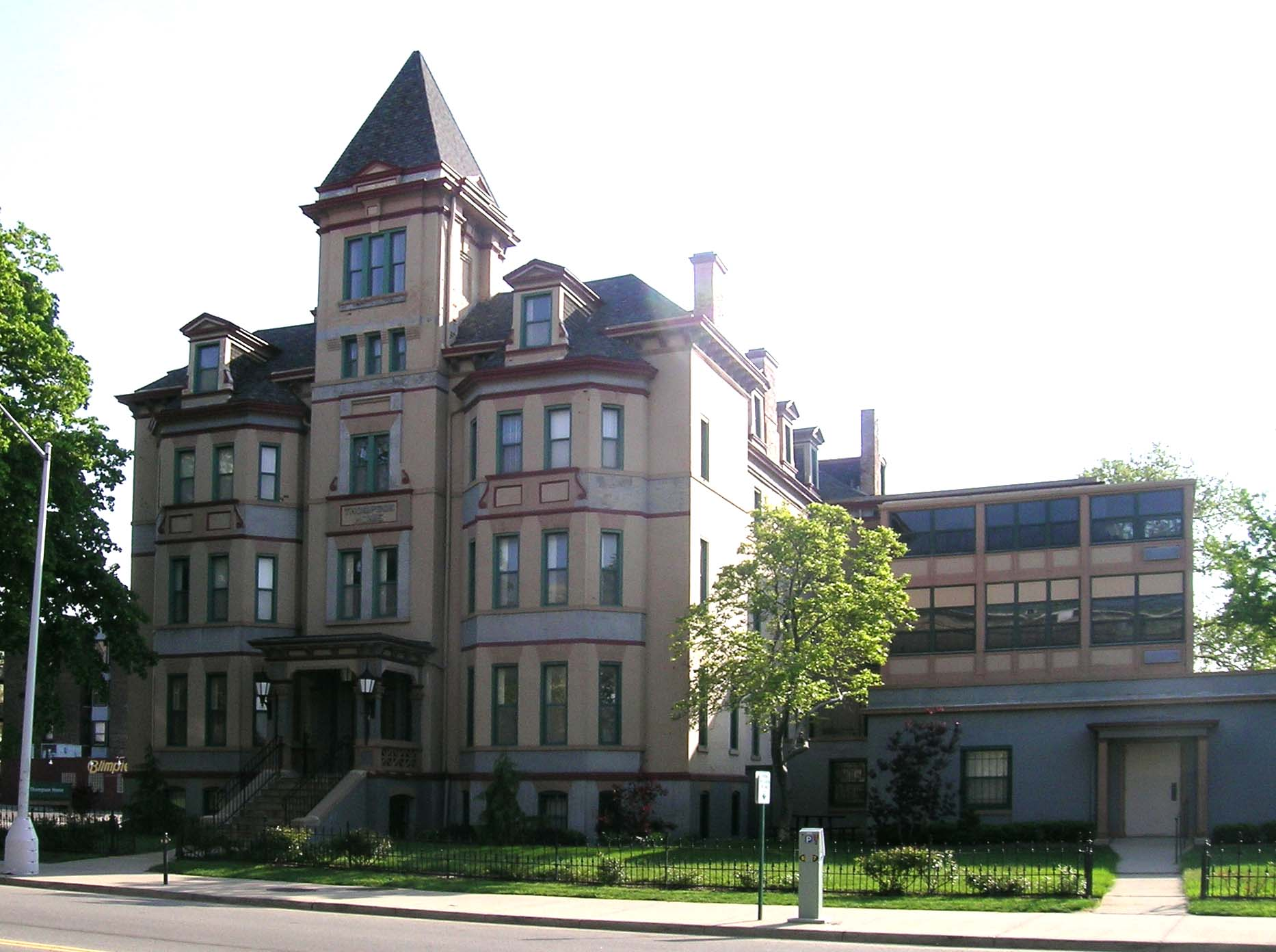
- Thompson Home from across Cass

- Location within Michigan Location within the United States
- Interactive map
- Location: 4756 Cass Avenue; Detroit, Michigan
- Coordinates: 42°21′18″N 83°3′57″W
- Built: 1884
- Architect: Mason & Rice
- Architectural style: Victorian
- Part of: Warren-Prentis Historic District (ID97001477)
- NRHP reference No.: 76001041

Significant dates
- Added to NRHP: June 03, 1976
- Designated CP: December 01, 1997
- Designated MSHS: November 14, 1974

The Thompson Home is a Victorian structure located at 4756 Cass Avenue in Midtown Detroit, Michigan. Originally the Thompson Home for Old Ladies, it was constructed in 1884, designated a Michigan State Historic Site in 1974, and listed on the National Register of Historic Places in 1976.

== History ==
David Thompson, a wealthy Detroit businessman, died in the early 1870s, leaving his estate to his wife Mary with instructions to establish a charitable institution. In 1874, Mary Thompson allocated $10,000 to build a home for aged women. However, construction did not start until nearly ten years later when land was purchased and Mary commissioned George D. Mason of the firm Mason & Rice to design the home.

Mason designed a four-story home measuring 60 by 90 feet with private rooms for forty women. For a number of years, the Thompson Home was a prestigious retirement home for wealthy widows. Sun rooms were added to the original structure in 1914, living quarters for the staff were added in the 1950s, and a five-bed infirmary was constructed in 1964. However, the number of residents declined in the 1960s and 1970s, and the home closed in 1977. Wayne State University bought the building and remodeled it, and in 1980 WSU's School of Social Work was installed in the building. In 2015, the School of Social Work relocated. The building was then converted into housing for students from the College of Fine, Performing and Communication Arts, reopening in Fall of 2017 after an extensive renovation.

== Architecture ==
The four-story home is Queen Anne in style. The front façade is dominated by an 80-foot tower, on either side of which bay window protrude. The windows are symmetric about the front, and a large stone carrying the building's name is set between the second and third floor. Artistic brickwork and painted bandcourses finish the exterior.
