= Lancaster and Waumbek Apartments =

- U.S. National Register of Historic Places
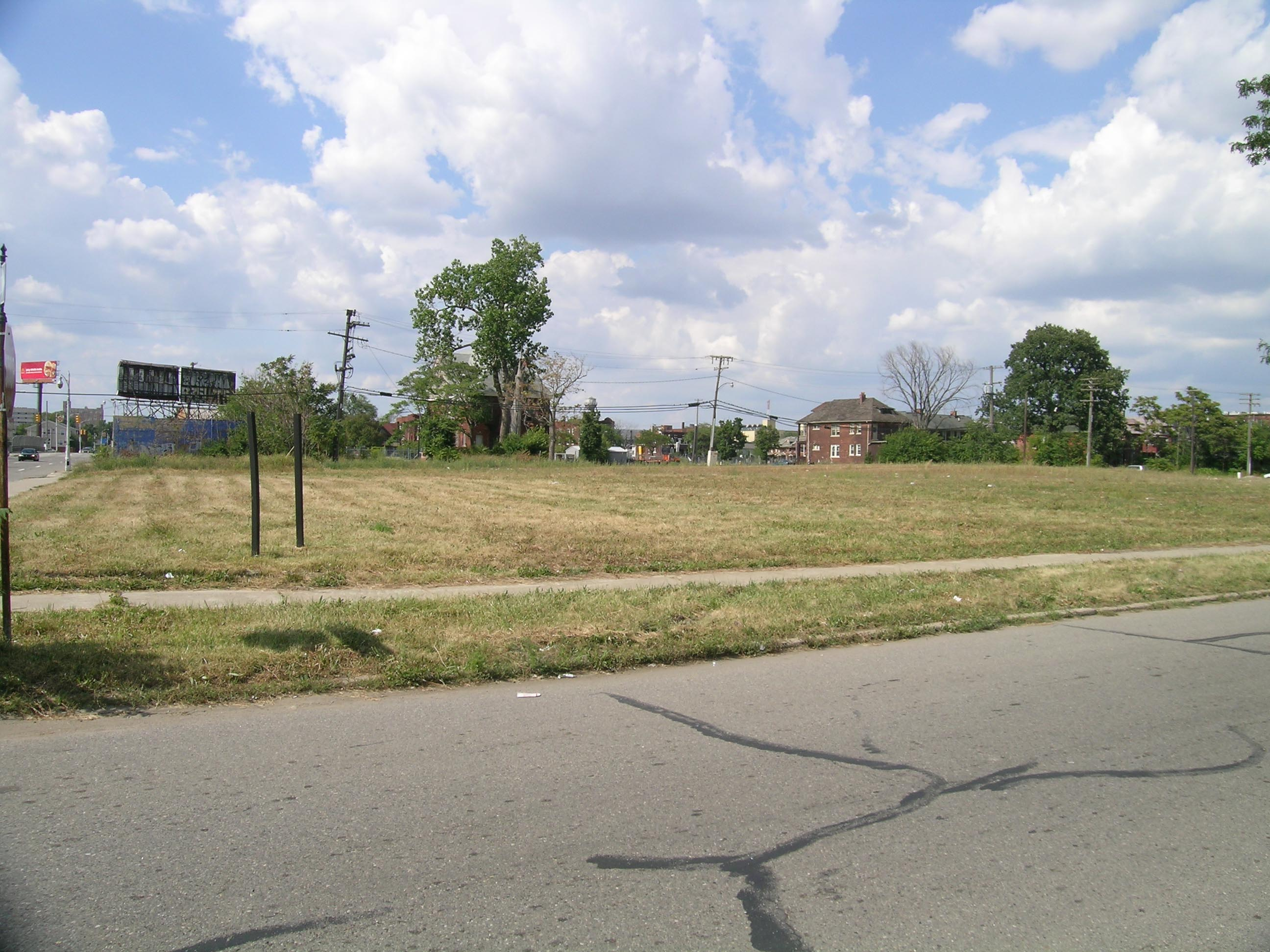
- Lot where the Lancaster and Waumbek Apartments once stood
- Interactive map
- Location: 227-29 and 237-39 East Palmer Avenue; Detroit, Michigan
- Coordinates: 42°21′47″N 83°3′55″W
- Built: 1904
- Architect: Almon Clother Varney
- Architectural style: Tudor Revival
- Demolished: November 2005
- NRHP reference No.: 97000921
- Added to NRHP: August 21, 1997

The Lancaster and Waumbek Apartments were small apartment buildings respectively located at 227-29 and 237-39 East Palmer Avenue in Detroit, Michigan. The apartments were listed on the National Register of Historic Places in 1997. They were demolished in November 2005.

== Significance ==
The two structures were well-designed examples of turn-of-the-century apartment houses in Detroit. They were designed by the prolific Almon Clother Varney, a notable architect of apartment buildings in early 20th century Detroit. These two buildings were once owned by one of Michigan's first suffragists, Sarah A. Sampson, who lived in the Lancaster with her husband from 1906 to 1919.

== History ==
The subdivision where these buildings stood was platted in 1878 by Joseph B.H. Bratshaw. in 1882, Bratshaw transferred the property to his daughter Sarah A. Sampson and Susan M. Swales. The land was re-platted in 1888, and in 1903 Swales transferred her interest in the property to Sampson. Sarah A. Sampson was prominent suffragist, and active in politics in Detroit. She was married to George L. Sampson, a merchant and businessman who owned a wholesale grocery house founded by Bratshaw.

In 1901, Sampson hired Almon Clother Varney to design an apartment building; Varney took out a building permit for the lot where the Waumbek eventually stood. It is likely that both the Lancaster and Waumbek were constructed according to Varney's plans, but probably a few years later in 1904. The apartments were named for Lancaster, New Hampshire, where George L. Sampson was born, and the Indian name for the White Mountains of New Hampshire.

Early residents of the Lancaster and Waumbek Apartments included families with some social status, including the Sampsons themselves, who lived in the Lancaster from 1906 until 1919. In 1919, Mrs. Sampson sold the Lancaster and Waumbek Apartments to Robert B. Weaver. The Weaver family owned the apartments until 1961. The two buildings were abandoned as of the mid-1990s, and were demolished in November 2005.

== Description ==
The Lancaster and Waumbek Apartments were two small three-story red brick Tudor Revival apartment buildings of similar design located side-by-side on East Palmer. Each building was constructed of brick trimmed with stone, and designed in a Tudor Revival style, although with slightly different detailing on the exterior. The façades featured projecting bays with a small light well in the middle. Both buildings measured approximately thirty-six feet wide by seventy feet deep.

The buildings were symmetrical, with a three-story monumental portico in the center of each, supported by brick piers rising two stories, and smaller brick piers on the third story level. The arched entrance was at the first floor of the portico, reached by a short flight of stairs. Detailing around the entrance archways differed between the two buildings, with the Lancaster entrance surrounded by cut-stone quoins, while the Waumbek had a label molding beneath the nameplate. Flanking the central entrance were three story, three-sided bays trimmed with limestone, containing three double-hung sash windows per floor. At the top, the bays culminated in a parapet wall, with the two buildings having slightly different detailing on the parapet.

On the interior, each of the two buildings were similar, with oak stair halls lined with wood paneled wainscoting. Each floor was divided into two apartments of similar layout, one on each side of the hall. The apartments had similar layouts: a front parlor with a bay window and a fireplace at the front of each unit, a long hall with two bedrooms off to the side, and the dining and kitchen in the rear.

== See also ==
- William C. Boydell House: another building designed by Almon Clother Varney
