= Elizabeth Williams Berry =

Australian-born jockey (died 1969)

Mother Berry
- Mother Berry in 1967

Personal information
- Full name: Elizabeth Williams Berry
- Nickname: Mother Berry
- Other names: Jack Williams
- Nationality: Australian; American
- Born: Melbourne, Australia
- Died: March 26, 1969 Helena, Montana, US
- Occupations: Jockey; horse trainer
- Height: 5 ft 2 in (1.57 m)
- Weight: Rode at 96 lb (44 kg)
- Spouse: J.B. Berry (m. 1903; died 1927)
- Children: 1 (adopted)

Horse racing career
- Sport: Horse racing
- Career wins: c. 4200

Honors
- Mother Berry Memorial Handicap, Helena Montana racetrack 1968–1976

Elizabeth Williams Berry (died March 26, 1969), who became known as Mother Berry some time after 1900, was an Australian-born jockey who rode in multiple nations disguised as a man, using the name Jack Williams. After moving to the United States about 1900, she married, and gained the nickname "Mother" after being granted custody of a runaway boy. She retired from jockeying to become a horse trainer. Berry and her husband settled in Helena, Montana, where Berry lived until her death in 1969.

== Biography ==
Berry's family were Welsh and had settled in Australia. Her exact age, however, is unclear. (Note: Berry claimed a birthdate of June 21, 1854. However, this would not only make her the oldest person from Oceania ever recorded, but also the oldest person ever at the time of her death. Berry also claimed to have won a race at Moonee Valley Racecourse at age ten, despite the track not having existed in 1864. If she had in fact won a race at that course at age ten, she would have had to been born in 1873 or later. Berry also may have been older than claimed at the time of her first victory, but no evidence exists to support this theory.). Berry started racing horses at roughly age six. Her father provided tutors to come to her home twice a week to provide for Berry's education. Her first racing win was when she placed first on the Moonee Valley Racecourse. She claims to have started racing professionally under the name of Jack Williams when she was 13 years old. In order to look the part of a boy, she wore traditional racing silks on the track, and off the track donned a Bowler derby and smoked cigars. She went on to race, disguised as a man, for more than 24 years as a jockey in Australia, England, France, Italy, New Zealand and South Africa. During her jockeying career, she was 5 ft 2 in (1.57 m) and weighed 96 pounds (44 kg). She told the Independent-Record that she won around 4,200 races during her career.

== American career ==
Berry arrived in the United States about 1900, and initially rode races in Northern California. She met her future husband, veterinarian J.B. "Doc" Berry, in Seattle, and they married six weeks later on 21 June 1903. A judge in Colorado gave her the nickname "Mother" when awarding her legal custody of a runaway boy she had taken in and taught horse racing skills. Berry retired from riding horses in 1911. After her jockeying career was over, she continued to work with racehorses as a trainer.

The Berrys moved to Helena, Montana, in 1913 and made the town their permanent residence. Berry raced horses on the Montana racing circuit and named several of them after her husband. Doc Berry died in 1927. In Helena, Mother Berry lived in a house at the Montana State Fairgrounds until 27 April 1937, when her home was destroyed by a fire. After the fire, she lived in a house on the local cemetery grounds for a few years. In 1956, she moved into the Stewart Homes project in Helena, where she lived for the remainder of her life. In 1965, she was declared the oldest person in Montana due to her claiming to be 111 at the time. In 1966, she was made an honorary member of the Capital City Horse Racing Association.

In February 1969, a few days before the groundbreaking ride of Diane Crump as the first woman in America to ride openly as a licensed female jockey in a parimutuel race, the Lexington Herald-Leader reviewed the history of women riding as jockeys, describing Berry as "probably the only lady jockey to compete successfully against men for any length of time." Berry died in her home in Helena on 26 March 1969. She was buried in Resurrection Cemetery. In Helena, a horse race named in her honor, The Mother Berry Memorial, ran during the 1970s.
