= Mary Long Alderson =

American suffragist and writer (1860–1940)

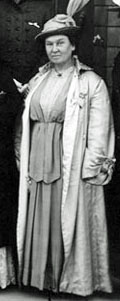
- Mary Long Alderson at the Montana WCTU, 1916
- Born: Mary Long; June 19, 1860; South Weymouth, Massachusetts
- Died: January 7, 1940 (aged 79); Bozeman, Montana
- Occupations: Social reformer; clubwoman; writer
- Spouse: Matthew William Alderson (m. 1888; died in 1924)

Mary Long Alderson (June 19, 1860 – January 7, 1940) was an American social reformer and leader active in suffrage, temperance, and women's club movements. She was also a writer. Alderson served as President of the Montana State Woman's Christian Temperance Union (WCTU).

== Early life ==
Mary Long was born on June 19, 1860, in South Weymouth, Massachusetts, to Eliza Regan and John E. Long. Her parents were both Irish immigrants born in the 1830s, residing in Massachusetts at the time of Mary's birth. At the time of recording during the 1860 Census – which would have been gathered the year Mary was born – there were two other adults living in the household, also from Ireland. Mary was raised in Boston and met prominent women such as Louisa May Alcott. Mary was educated under the “Quincy Method” in Quincy, Massachusetts.

== Career ==
Long worked as a teacher until 1887, when she met Matthew William Alderson (1855–1924). The following year, she became his second wife. The two were married in Braintree, Massachusetts, and settled in Bozeman, Montana. They would eventually have three daughters.

=== Journalist ===
Matt Alderson and his father published the Bozeman Avant Courier. Mary wrote for the Avant Courier, including editorial content, specifically advocating against corsets and long skirts. She also wrote on botany, temperance, and women's suffrage. In this position, she was one of the few female members of the Montana Press Association. As a temperance activist, Alderson also served as the editor of the WCTU Journal of Montana.

=== Activist ===
Alderson attended the 1893 World's Columbian Exposition in Chicago. There, she heard suffragist speakers including Susan B. Anthony. Alderson returned to Bozeman eager to organize for women's right to vote. She led the charge for women's suffrage in Montana, and the state granted Montana women the right to vote in 1914. Alderson was the recording secretary for the executive committee during the Second Annual Convention of the Montana Equal Suffrage Association in November 1896. She was also the recording secretary for the 1904 state convention of the Woman's Christian Temperance Union.

Alderson was an active clubwoman. She was a member WCTU, serving as president of the Montana chapter from 1913 to 1916. She was the editor of the Montana WCTU Journal. She was also a member of the "Montana State Housekeepers Society" and the "Bozeman Society for the Promotion of Physical Culture and Correct Dress". Alderson was the Montana chairwoman of driving force behind the "Floral Emblem Campaign" which voted Lewisia rediviva, commonly known as the bitterroot, as the official state flower.

In 1930, Alderson resigned from the WCTU. She continued to be an outspoken activist on issues such as child welfare, education, and labor laws.

== Death and legacy ==
Alderson died in Bozeman, Montana, on January 7, 1940, at the age of 79.

Her papers are part of the "Alderson Family Collection" housed at the Merrill G. Burlingame Archives and Special Collections of the Montana State University Library. This collection includes, among other items, diaries, letters, scrapbooks, and photographs created by or pertaining to the Alderson family. A collection of Alderson's papers from 1894-1936 is held at the Montana Historical Society. This includes manuscripts for "A Half Century of Progress for Montana Women," biographical sketches on figures in Montana history, and three scrapbooks about the selection of the bitterroot as Montana's state flower.

== Selected publications ==
- Alderson, Mary Long. n.d. Thirty-four years in the Montana Woman's Christian Temperance Union, 1896-1930.
- Alderson, Mary Long. 1924. Matt W. Alderson, 1855-1924.
- Alderson, Mary Long. 1902. Montana's floral emblem -- Lewisia rediviva. [U.S.]: Rocky Mountain Magazine.

== See also ==
- List of suffragists and suffragettes
