= Maggie Smith Hathaway =

American politician

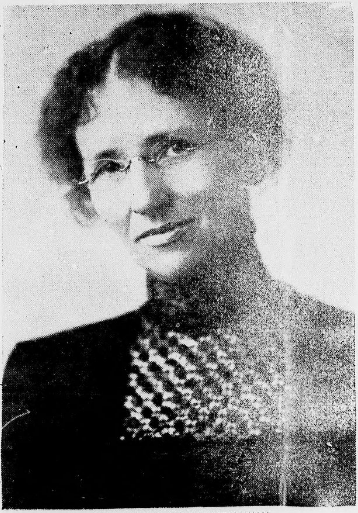
- Born: 1867; Ottawa, Ohio
- Died: September 17, 1955 (aged 87–88); Tacoma, Washington
- Title: Montana State Legislature
- Term: 1917–1921
- Political party: Democratic
- Movement: Women's Suffrage, Temperance

Maggie Smith Hathaway (1867–1955) was a Montana politician (D) in the first half of the nineteenth century. Hathaway, representing Ravalli County, was one of the first two Montana women elected to state legislature in 1917—over two full years before the Nineteenth Amendment became part of the United States Constitution—along with Emma Ingalls (R) from Flathead County.

== Early life ==
Maggie Smith was born in 1867 in Ottawa, Ohio, the daughter of a Methodist Episcopal minister. She became a teacher when she was fifteen and taught in Ohio. Smith arrived in Montana in 1894, serving the Helena schools for a period before eventually becoming principal and county superintendent of schools in Helena. The Epworth League, established in 1889 in Cleveland, Ohio, was formed as a junior league to extend the effectiveness of Methodism; Smith became a member of the Montana League in 1894. The following year, she became the state president, and worked to make the organization more effectively carry its message of Methodism statewide. She was also active in the Women's Christian Temperance Union. In 1911, she married Benjamin Tappan Hathaway, a deputy superintendent of the State Department of Public Instruction. He died when they had only been married six months. Shortly after her husband's death, Hathaway moved to Cascade County where she operated an 800 acre "manless" ranch that only employed women due to both her stance of feminism and the shortage of men during World War I.

== Political career ==
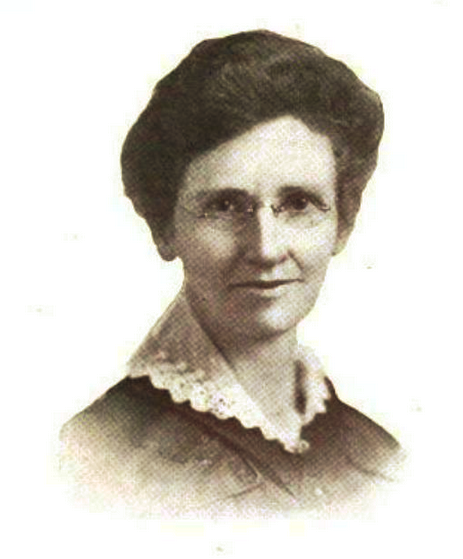
(1918)

Following the death of her husband, Hathaway became interested in politics. Hathaway quickly made a name for herself with her tireless work ethic, beginning as a clerk in the Montana House in 1913. She actively lobbied for women's suffrage and the Montana Women's Organization (in 1915) and served as one of the first two women in the Montana legislature, 1917–1921. Some of her legislation concerned alcohol and tobacco controls in the state. In 1920, the Democratic caucus elected her the minority floor leader, making her the first woman in American history to receive this distinction. Hathaway's tireless work ethic and relentless devotion to the causes that she championed earned her the respect of her fellow male legislators. Because of these traits, her male counterparts affectionately referred to her as "Mrs. Has-Her-Way," due to her argumentative abilities. One male legislator once remarked that "She [Hathaway] is the biggest man in the House." Following the end of her term, Hathaway unsuccessfully ran for the office of Representative to the U. S. Congress from Montana in 1922.

== Later years and legacy ==
Following her unsuccessful run for the House of Representatives, in 1925, Hathaway was appointed secretary of the Bureau of Child Protection in Montana, and served in that post for three years. Here, she worked to advance the welfare of women and children in the state. In 1936, she was appointed director of Child Welfare Services of the Montana Relief Commission. In this post, she traveled to Washington, D.C., to lobby for women and children. She left that position in 1937 and became a freelance worker. In 1940 she became Informational Representative of the State Department of Public Welfare, and became secretary of the Montana Temperance Commission in 1941. In 1953, the Montana Conference of Social Welfare honored Hathaway at its annual banquet. Maggie Smith Hathaway died in Tacoma, Washington, on September 17, 1955, at the age of 89.
