= Perry McAdow House =

- U.S. National Register of Historic Places
- U.S. Historic district – Contributing property
- Michigan State Historic Site
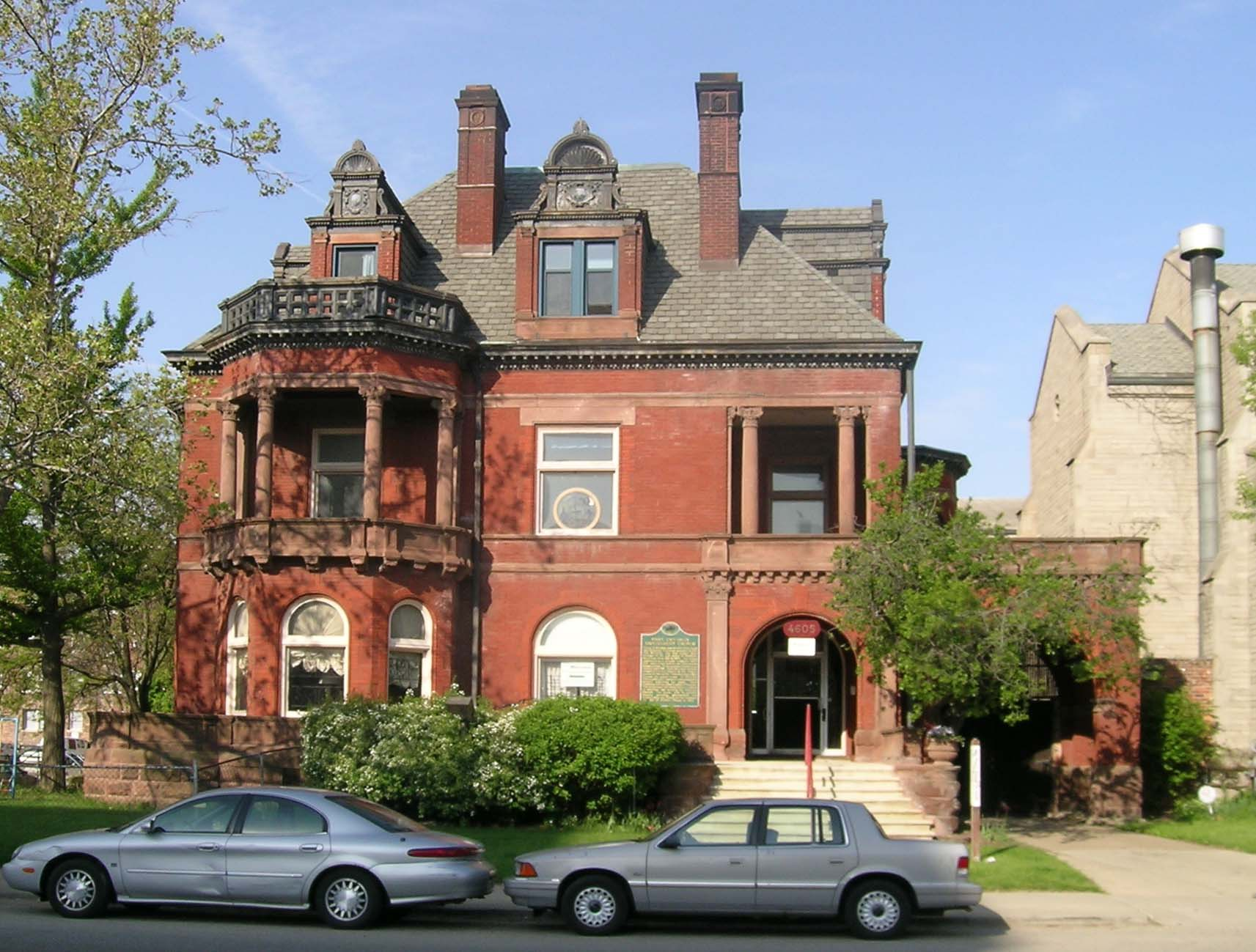
- Interactive map
- Location: 4605 Cass Avenue; Detroit, Michigan
- Coordinates: 42°21′11″N 83°3′56″W
- Built: 1891
- Architect: Martin Scholls & Son
- Architectural style: Renaissance Revival
- Part of: Warren-Prentis Historic District (ID97001477)
- NRHP reference No.: 80004405

Significant dates
- Added to NRHP: July 03, 1980
- Designated CP: December 01, 1997
- Designated MSHS: December 14, 1976

The Perry McAdow House is a Renaissance Revival house located at 4605 Cass Avenue in Midtown Detroit, Michigan. It was designated a Michigan State Historic Site in 1976 and added to the National Register of Historic Places in 1980.

== History ==
Clara McAdow married her first husband, Dr. C. E. Tomlinson, in Jackson, Michigan. moved to Coulson, Montana, where Clara got a job with the Northern Pacific Railroad, and was able to move to a position of responsibility unusual for a woman at the time. When Tomlinson died, Clara invested their savings in property in Billings, and was noted as having made some of the biggest real estate investments and trades in Billings' history. She met Perry W. McAdow through her real estate trading, and married him in 1884. Perry was given the opportunity to buy a stake in the Spotted Horse mine with Snookum Joe Anderson, but wasn't interested in mining. When Anderson wanted to move on, Clara took over the business, buying it for $11,000. After two years, the mine was producing about 75 ounces of gold a day. She sold it in 1890 to investors from Helena, Montana, for $500,000.

The couple returned to Detroit, and in 1891, they built an elaborate mansion on Cass for a cost of $65,000 as an entrance into Detroit society. The couple lived there until 1897. The house was used as a private residence until 1913, when it was sold to the First Universalist congregation. The church used it as a place of worship for three years until a new church immediately to the north was completed, after which the house was used as a parish house.

== Architecture ==
The house has two and a half stories with a hipped roof, and is constructed of red brick and brownstone. The exterior boasts bay windows, Corinthian columned porches, parapet balustrades, and a modillion cornice; the interior features notable frescos, paneling, plasterwork and stained glass. Behind the original house is a two-story, red brick church hall, built in 1917.
