= Belle Winestine =

American writer and activist

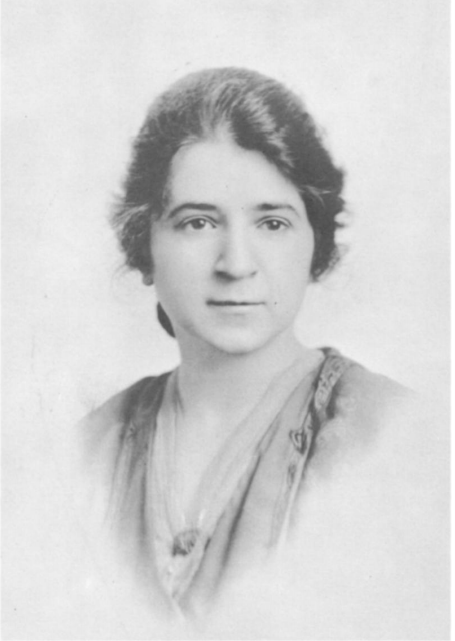
- Fligelman Winestine, c. 1916
- Born: Belle Fligelman; 1891; Helena, Montana, U.S.
- Died: April 21, 1985 (aged 93–94); Helena, Montana, U.S.
- Occupations: Writer; Activist
- Spouse: Norman Winestine (m. 1918)

Belle Fligelman Winestine (1891-1985) was an American writer and activist. She became involved in the women's suffrage movement while still a student at the University of Wisconsin. She then became a journalist before applying her skill as a writer to the Congressional campaign of Jeannette Rankin.

== Early life and education ==
Belle Fligelman was born in 1891 to Herman and Minnie Fligelman in Helena, Montana. Her parents were Jewish immigrants from Romania. Fligelman had one older sister, Frieda. Frieda and Belle were raised by their father and stepmother, Getty Vogelman. Fligelman's mother died when Belle was only two weeks old. Herman Fligelman became one of the wealthiest businessmen in Helena.

Fligelman attended college at the University of Wisconsin, where she studied journalism and philosophy. While in college, she served as editor of the women's page of the student newspaper. She was voted president of the Women's Student Government Association and selected as commencement speaker, the first woman to receive that honor. Fliegelman's position as president of the Women's Student Government Association led to the State Headquarters for Woman Suffrage inviting her to address a joint session of the Wisconsin State Legislature.

== Career ==
Although she did not need to work because of her family wealth, Fligelman began reporting for the Helena Daily after college. She was the first woman to work as a reporter for the paper. She then spent a year as editor of the Montana Progressive.

Fligelman continued to be active in the suffrage movement. She helped launch Montana's women's suffrage campaign in 1914. Fligelman and her fellow suffragists drove around waving banners and handing out literature. Montana granted women the right to vote that year.

In 1916, she was appointed to the Republican Women's Campaign Committee for Montana.

Fligelman was an early supporter of Jeannette Rankin. She encouraged Rankin to run for office and to do so on a platform supporting Prohibition. Once Rankin's campaign for the United States House of Representatives was underway, Fligelman oversaw the publishing and mailings. In November 1916, Rankin became the first woman elected to Congress. Figelman traveled with Rankin to Washington, D.C., where she worked as Rankin's private secretary.

While in Washington, she met Norman Winestine, whom she married in 1918. Norman and Belle Winestine moved to New York where they both wrote for Nation.

In 1932, Winestine ran for the Montana Senate from Lewis and Clark County as a Republican, but lost. Later she was a leader of the Montana League of Women Voters as the group pushed for ratification of the Equal Rights Amendment in Montana.

== Personal life and death ==
Belle and Norman Winestine had three children: Mina, Judy, and Henry. Belle Winestine died in Helena on April 21, 1985, of complications from a stroke the previous year.
