= Clara McAdow =

American women's suffragist and mine owner (1838–1896)

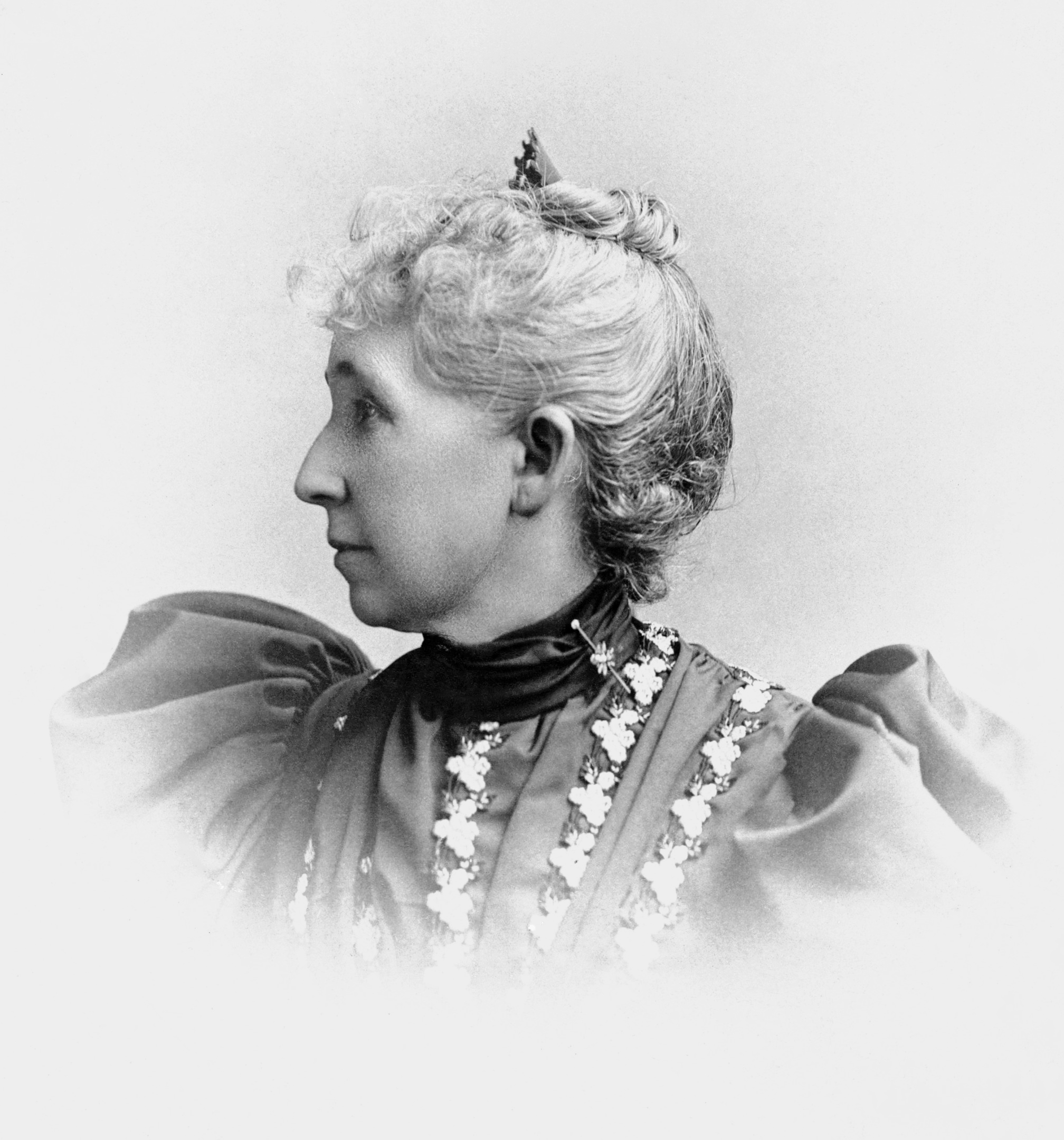
Clara McAdow

Clara Coltrin Tomlinson McAdow (1838 – January 19, 1896) was an American women's suffragist and a mine owner in Montana.

== Biography ==
McAdow was born Clara Coltrin in Ohio, the eldest of eight children born to Joseph and Annie Coltrin. She grew up in Jackson, Michigan.

McAdow moved to Coulson, Montana, with her first husband Dr. C. E. Tomlinson. She got a job with Northern Pacific Railroad and did side jobs including a check-cashing business because there was not yet a bank in Billings, Montana.

When Tomlinson died, she took their savings and invested in real estate in Billings. She met Perry W. McAdow through her real estate ventures and purchased the Spotted Horse mine from him, which he had received as payment for a debt. Clara took charge of all aspects of the mine, directing all of its operations and often living on site. The mine, which she purchased for $11,000, was sold in 1890 for $500,000. Working at the mine made McAdow a metallurgy expert; she was the only woman invited to the Congress of Mining at the 1892 World's Columbian Exposition. Her mine provided the gold base of the Justice for the Treasure State’s exhibit cast in a likeness of Ada Rehan. She was a member of the Board of Lady Managers at the Exposition.

Clara and Perry married in 1884, and they built a mansion, the Perry McAdow House, in Detroit in 1891. Clara died in Detroit on January 19, 1896, of "stomach trouble." She left an estate worth an estimated two million dollars.

On October 2, 1897, Perry married Marian A. Tyrrell-Wyles in Milwaukee, Wisconsin. The couple moved to Punta Gorda, Florida, where they resided until Perry's death.

McAdow was intensely interested in the women's suffrage movement, hosting Carrie Chapman Catt and Susan B. Anthony in her home to promote giving women the vote. She founded a branch of the women’s literary society the Twentieth Century Club. She was a member of the Society for Psychical Research; however, she was also a skeptic, being one of the people who exposed Henry Slade as a fraud.
