= Montana State Fairgrounds Racetrack =

- U.S. National Register of Historic Places

- Location within Montana
- Location: 98 W. Custer Avenue, Helena, Montana, U.S.
- Coordinates: 46°37′17″N 112°03′22″W
- Built: 1870
- NRHP reference No.: 06001136
- Added to NRHP: December 20, 2006

The Montana State Fairgrounds Racetrack, also known as the Lewis and Clark County Fairgrounds Racetrack and as Helena Downs, is a historic horse racing track located on the outskirts of Helena, Montana, in the United States. Constructed in 1870, the track was part of the Montana State Fairgrounds, now the Lewis and Clark County Fairgrounds. The racetrack was added to the National Register of Historic Places on December 20, 2006. Portions of the track were demolished from 2006 to 2008 due to new construction on the fairgrounds.

== Horse racing in Montana ==
Native Americans first brought horses to the northern Great Plains in the early to mid 1700s, and horse racing among Native Americans in what later became Montana was common. Horse racing also became popular among white settlers in the area, particularly miners.

Semi-formal local horse flat racing meets first occurred in Montana in Deer Lodge, Helena, and Virginia City in the 1860s. Helena's first permanent horse racing track was Madam Coady's Two-Mile House, (Note: The exact location of Madam Coady's, and the racetrack, is not known.) a 1 mile (1.6 km) track located a few miles from Helena. The first Montana Territorial Fair was held at the site 1868, and included Montana's first regionally-organized horse flat race. Harness racing was added at the second Territorial Fair in 1869.

== The Montana State Fairgrounds track ==
=== Construction of the track ===
In August 1870, a group of Helena businessmen and civic leaders organized a new association, the Montana Agricultural Mineral and Mechanical Association, to host a new regional fair. Among the trustees of the new organization were such prominent Montanans as Daniel A. G. Floweree, Cornelius Hedges, Anton M. Holter, and Conrad Kohrs. The group purchased property outside Helena (at the current location of the Montana State Fairgrounds), and construction of the racetrack began immediately. The 1 mile (1.6 km) track was built according to the rules of the American Horse Congress and the California State Agricultural Society, had a 0.25-mile (0.40 km) home stretch, and was wide enough to accommodate eight sulkies. It is unclear if the track was a regular oval or if it had slightly distorted third and fourth turns which gave it an irregular oblong shape. (Note: All existing map and photographic evidence indicates the home stretch, as constructed in 1870, remained in place as of 2003.) At the time of its construction, it was the only regulation 1 mile (1.6 km) track in the territory.

Several other buildings were erected about the same time as the track was constructed. Grandstands were constructed probably at the same as the track, (Note: The date of construction is unclear, but 1870 is the likeliest date. They were definitely in place no later than 1887.) beginning near the starting line and extending eastward. A "paddock" was built to the east of the grandstand, and around the first turn were three stables. (Note: The date of construction for the stables is unclear. They were definitely in place by 1887. The nature of the "paddock" is unclear. The term denotes an enclosed by unroofed space for the temporary holding of animals, but there is some evidence that the "paddock" was a roofed building even in its earliest days. There is strong evidence that the "paddock" was roofed (and thus more like a stable or barn) by 1892, and probably rebuilt as a stable or barn in 1903 or 1904.)

=== Early history of the track ===
Races were held throughout the summer (not just at fair-time). They attracted horses from as far away as Salt Lake City, and even included some high-quality Kentucky thoroughbreds. By 1884, horse racing tracks had been built in Bozeman and Butte, and a "Montana Circuit" for horse racing had evolved. Races at Montana Circuit tracks became more exclusive, and applicant horses had to be vetted by a nomination committee before being allowed to race. The Montana Circuit eventually expanded to 15 regulation tracks. On either side of the finish line were judging stands. These are two-storied structures which gave judging officials a clear view of the finish line so that they might declare which horses won and placed in the race. Initially, these were merely covered platforms, but they were replaced several times over the years with more elaborate, permanent structures with walls, windows, and amenities.

Montana became a U.S. state in 1889, and the fair was renamed the Montana State Fair in 1891 after being sold to a new group of investors. Helena horse racing continued to gain in prestige, with owners in Denver, Colorado, and Spokane, Washington, sending entries. The track was rebuilt that year. (Note: If the 1870 track were oblong, it is most likely it was corrected to a true oval at this time.) A Montana Central Railway spur reached the fairgrounds that same year, and local undocumented tradition claimed that several railroad cars of earth from Kentucky were laid on the track.

The Panic of 1893 created significant economic disruption in Montana, and the Montana State Fair shut down after the 1895 event. The fairgrounds were mortgaged, and the issuers of the loan foreclosed.

=== Period of state ownership ===
Helena residents raised money in 1903 to buy the fairgrounds, which were donated to the state. By this time, the track had so deteriorated that large amounts of soil had to be trucked in to restore the turns. The state of Montana authorized a subsidized Montana State Fair in 1903, and in 1904 relay races were added. About this time, a two-story raised platform was erected just outside the first turn. This platform was used by racing officials to direct animals and riders before and after races. In 1904, the three stables were moved from the first turn to outside the far stretch and rebuilt as speed barns. A fourth speed barn and three more stables were built at some point thereafter. (Note: There is some evidence that indicates the three new stables were built in 1904.) Two small cottages were erected about this time as well. One was against the north fence between the speed barns and stables, and another was at the end of a long shed built east of the speed barns. The cottage attached to the shed was used by the racetrack veterinarian.

Significant changes to the viewing area were made after 1904. Three sets of bleachers were erected at the racetrack between 1903 and 1914. The first (the "long bleachers") was erected about 700 feet (210 m) west of the grandstands, probably in 1904. The second set was erected between 1904 and 1913 to the west of the grandstand, and the third (the "small bleachers") to the west of the long bleachers, probably in 1914. The old grandstands were demolished in 1906, and replaced with larger ones. Roughly 260 feet (79 m) long and 60 feet (18 m) wide, they cost $20,000 ($716,667 in 2025 dollars) and were capable of seating 5,000 people. Beneath the grandstands were a small jockey's dressing room (eastern end), a restaurant, and a room with betting windows.

The horse racing at the Montana State Fair began to decline after the Montana Legislature banned betting on horse races in 1914. The fair's financial situation deteriorated when the state legislature significantly cut the subsidy in 1915, and a worsening decade-long drought led to fewer paying exhibitors. A 0.5 miles (0.80 km) dirt automobile racing track was built in the horse racing track's infield in 1916, nestled against the first turn. Although horse racing remained popular at the fairgrounds, economic difficulties led to the fair's cancellation in 1926. Organizers managed to host only small fairs 1927 to 1932.

The ban on gambling was lifted in 1930. That year, more than 350 high-quality racehorses from the U.S., Canada, and Mexico raced at Helena, and parimutuel betting (assisted by an automatic totaliser) first occurred. The "paddock" was abandoned the same year, and a true, open-air paddock was built next to it.

=== Closure and reopening ===
The last Montana State Fair was held in Helena in 1932. The 1935 Helena earthquake and several fires in the 1930s and 1940s destroyed several unspecified structures associated with the horse racing track. In the fall of 1937, the three north stables and veterinarian's cottage burned down. Horse racing ended during this time, and the track was abandoned except for the small section in front of the grandstand (used as part of the automobile race track).

The largest of the four north barns was relocated to nearby Green Meadow Ranch about 1938. The remaining three north barns either burned down or were demolished by 1951. Both finish-line judging stands were removed by then as well.

In mid-1953, the Capital City Racing Association constructed a 0.25 miles (0.40 km) oval stock car racing track inside the 1916 automobile track. It remained in until 1956.

Horse racing returned to the horse track in 1964, some years after organizers hosted the first Last Chance Stampede at the fairgrounds. Some newspapers began referring to the horse track as "Helena Downs" at this time. Horse racing lasted until 1998, and a year later the state turned the fairgrounds over to Lewis and Clark County.

=== County ownership and changes to the track ===
The grandstands were demolished in 2000. They had fallen into a decrepit state, and preservationists vigorously asked for them to be preserved. But the cost was too great, and the state declined to assume the cost. New modern, metal bleachers were erected in their place, and in the infield just west of the first turn. The new grandstands, designed to accommodate rodeo activities in the infield, occupied about one-eighth of the horse racing track surface. Both the second turn, home stretch, and backstretch were bulldozed to accommodate rodeo activities.

The public discussion over the grandstands led the Lewis and Clark County Historic Preservation Office to conduct a historic assessment of the Montana State Fairgrounds in 2003.

In 2005, the Lewis and Clark County Fair Board began consideration of a plan to reconfigured the old Montana State Fairgrounds for reuse. The plans called for a new grandstand and a large new exhibition building in the horse track infield, and demolition of the home stretch. Although there was support for the return of horse racing and restoration of the track, the fair board declined to amend the plan to accommodate it. When the county began building an access road across the horse racing track in the fall of 2005 in preparation for construction, an organization named Save the Track Foundation unsuccessfully sued to have the road stopped.

In November 2006, Lewis and Clark County voters approved a $5.7 million ($9,100,000 in 2025 dollars) tax levy to implement the changes proposed by the fair board.

Despite the partial blockage and demolition of the track, the horse racing track (but not any associated buildings) was added to the National Register of Historic Places in December 2006.

In 2006, the Save the Track Foundation filed several lawsuits to enjoin Lewis and Clark County from implementing its reconfiguration of the fairgrounds. The group claimed that the fair board had misled voters by failing to disclose that the horse racing track would be partially demolished and the infield used for construction. County officials said the reconfiguration plan saved most of the track for horse racing and preservation purposes, and that a lengthy planning process determined that partial demolition and use of the infield was the best use of the land given current and future needs. A Montana District Court judge declined to issue a temporary injunction halting the plan, and in March 2008 issued a formal ruling in favor of the county. The ruling allowed final construction on the new 60,000 square feet (5,600 m^{2}) exhibition building to go forward.

== About the track ==
The Montana State Fairgrounds Racetrack is located in the center of the 160-acre (650,000 m^{2}) fairgrounds.

Grandstands, three sets of bleachers, an enclosed "paddock", two judging platforms, and three stables were built during the track's early history on the home stretch and first turn. Speed barns, three stables, and two cottages were built adjacent to the back stretch in the first two or three decades of the 20th century. No historic structures associated with the track's history remained as of 2006.

The Montana State Fairgrounds Racetrack was one of only three 1-mile (1.6 km) tracks west of the Mississippi River in 2005. It was reported to be the oldest of these 1-mile (1.6 km) tracks in 2006, as well as the oldest extant horse racing track in Montana, and the only racing track built in Montana's territorial period to survive into the 21st century. According to the American Racing Manual, it was the second oldest horse racing track of its kind in the nation.

== Bibliography ==
- Helena/Lewis and Clark County Historic Preservation Commission (December 2003). Lewis and Clark County Fairgrounds: Historic Sites Review (PDF) (Report). Helena, Mont.
