= List of South Dakota suffragists =

This is a list of South Dakota suffragists, suffrage groups and others associated with the cause of women's suffrage in South Dakota.

== Groups ==
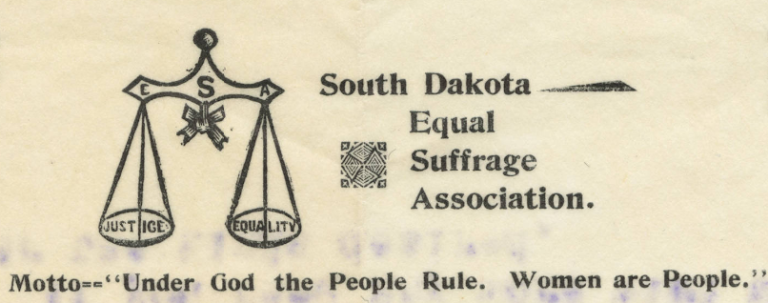
South Dakota Equal Suffrage Association letterhead

- Aberdeen Equal Suffrage Club.
- Athol Equal Suffrage Association, organized in 1890.
- Bon Homme Universal Franchise League.
- Brookings Equal Suffrage Association.
- Brown County Equal Suffrage Association.
- Codington County Men's Suffrage League.
- Davison County Equal Suffrage Club.
- Edmunds County Equal Suffrage Association.
- Frankfort Equal Suffrage Association.
- Grant County Equal Suffrage Association, formed in 1890.
- Highmore Equal Suffrage Association.
- Hurley Suffrage Association.
- Lake County Universal Franchise League.
- Minnehaha County Equal Suffrage Association.
- Mitchell Woman Suffrage Club.
- Onida Equal Suffrage Club.
- Philip Suffrage Club, organized in 1910.
- Pierre Political Equality Club.
- Rapid City Suffrage Club.
- Roberts County Suffrage Association.
- Sioux Falls Franchise League.
- South Dakota Equal Suffrage Association, founded in 1890.
- South Dakota Universal Franchise League, founded in 1911.
- Spearfish Franchise League.
- Sturgis Equal Suffrage League.
- Union County Equal Suffrage Association, organized in 1897.
- Watertown Universal Franchise League.
- Woman's Christian Temperance Union.

== Suffragists ==
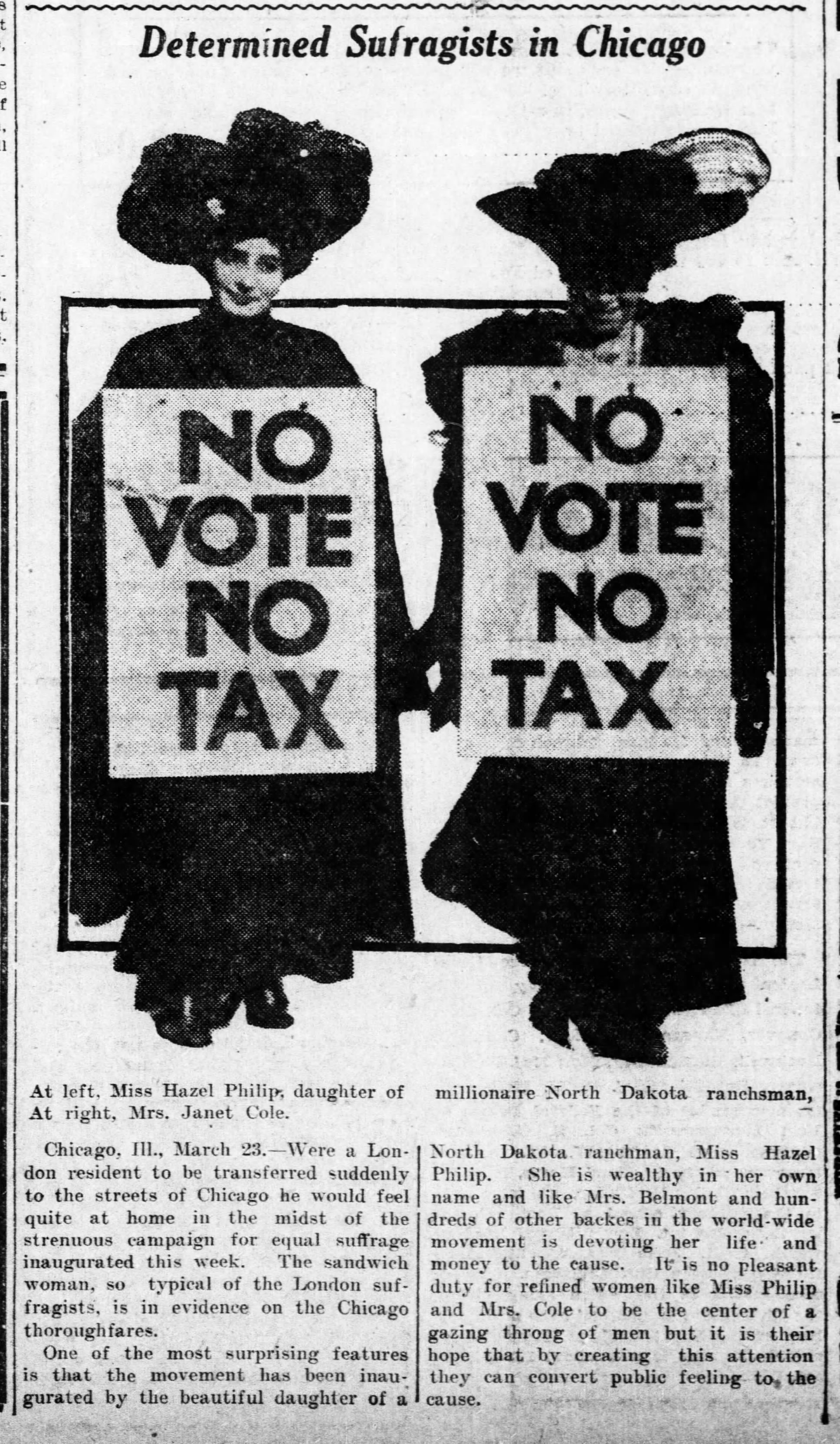
"Determined Suffragists in Chicago" Leavenworth Times, March 24, 1910, Hazel Philip of North Dakota and Janet Cole of South Dakota.

- Irene G. Adams (Webster).
- Ida M. Anding (Pierre).
- Rachel M. Ross Austin (Vermillion).
- Blanche Pentecost Bagley (Sioux Falls).
- William F. Bailey (Faulkton/Roanoke).
- Helen M. Barker (Huron).
- L. Frank Baum (Abderdeen).
- Edith M. Beaumont (Madison).
- Ellen J. Beach (Britton).
- Elsie Lincoln Benedict (Deadwood).
- Marium L. Bennett (Clark).
- May B. Billinghurst (East Pierre).
- Susie Bird (Fourche).
- LoElla H. Blank (Wessington Springs).
- Thomas Linus Blank (Wessington Springs).
- Marietta Bones (Webster).
- Mary Cummings Bonhamn.
- Ruby Hine Booth (Spearfish).
- Rose Bower (Rapid City).
- Etta Estey Boyce (Sioux Falls).
- Nellie Hough Bradley (Sturgis).
- Marjorie Breeden (Pierre).
- Jane Rooker Breeden (Pierre).
- Mina E. Campbell (Sioux Falls).
- Dora Cassem (Mitchell).
- Emmer Cook (Huron).
- Caroline Bartlett Crane (Sioux Falls).
- Emma Amelia Cranmer (Ipswich/Huron/Aberdeen).
- Simeon H. Cranmer (Ipswich/Huron/Aberdeen).
- Alice Lorraine Daly (Madison).
- John DeVoe.
- Emma Smith DeVoe (Huron).
- Mary A. Dilger (Rapid City).
- Lorena King Fairbank (Huron).
- Mary Ella Noyes Farr (Hot Springs, Pierre).
- Hattie E. Fellows (Sioux Falls).
- William Fielder.
- Kate Uline Folger (Watertown).
- May P. Ghrist (Miller).
- Nana E. Gilbert (Salem).
- Rebecca B. Hager (Madison/Aberdeen).
- Nettie C. Hall (Wessington Springs).
- Sophia M. Harden (Woonsocket/Huron).
- Ruth B. Hipple (Pierre).
- Florence Jeffries (Fort Pierre).
- Philena Everett Johnson (Highmore).
- Adeline Karcher (Pierre).
- Marguerite Karcher-Sahr (Pierre).
- Werdna Kellar (Lead).
- Della Robinson King (Scotland).
- Henrietta C. Lyman (Pierre).
- Wilhelmina M. Oleson (Deadwood).
- Nina D. Pettigrew (Spearfish/Belle Fourche).
- Alice M. Alt Pickler (Faulkton).
- Katherine W. Powell (Custer/Spearfish).
- Mamie Shields Pyle (Huron).
- Luella A. Ramsey (Woonsocket).
- Samuel A. Ramsey (Woonsocket).
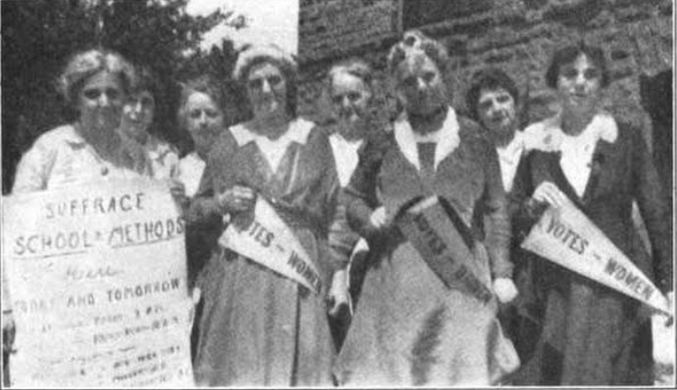
  The faculty of South Dakota's suffrage school (1918)
- Dorothy M. Rehfeld (Aberdeen).
- Mabel Rewman (Deadwood).
- Sarah A. Richards (Pukwana).
- Martha A. Scott (Sioux Falls).
- Minnie E. Sheldon (Sioux Falls).
- Anna R. Simmons (Huron/Mitchell/Faulkton).
- Jennie M. Taylor (Sioux Falls).
- Mary Maguire Thomas.
- Cicely J. Tinsley (Sioux Falls/Deadwood).
- Jennie Walton (Huron).
- Alonzo Wardall (Huron).
- Elizabeth M. Wardall (Huron).
- Myra P. Weller (Mitchell).
- Elinor H. Whiting (Pierre).
- Eliza Tupper Wilkes (Sioux Falls).
- Frances Woods.

=== Politicians supporting women's suffrage ===
- John T. Blakemore.
- Frank M. Byrne.
- R. F. Pettigrew.
- John Pickler.
- Enos Stutsman.
- Robert S. Vessey.

== Suffragists campaigning in South Dakota ==
- Jane Addams.
- Beulah Amidon.
- Susan B. Anthony.
- Sarah Atkins.
- Rachel Foster Avery.
- Barton O. Aylesworth.
- Helen LaReine Baker.
- Louise G. Baldwin.
- Adelaide Ballard.
- Clara Barton.
- Elsie Lincoln Benedict.
- Alice Stone Blackwell.
- Henry Browne Blackwell.
- Mary C. C. Bradford.
- Rachael Brill.
- Olympia Brown.
- Ulrikka F. Bruun.
- Mary Baird Bryan.
- Alice Snitzer Burke.
- Carrie Chapman Catt.
- Clara Bewick Colby.
- Mary E. Craigie.
- Stella Crossley.
- Ida Crouch-Hazlett.
- Emma Smith DeVoe (returns to campaign after moving away).
- Marion H. Drake.
- Julia Mills Dunn.
- Emmy Carlsson Evald.
- Susan S. Fessenden.
- Antoinette Funk.
- Matilda Joslyn Gage.
- Omar E. Garwood.
- Mary L. Geffs.
- Helen M. Gougar.
- Sara Green.
- Laura A. Gregg.
- Harriet Grim.
- Mary Garrett Hay.
- Matilda Hindman.
- Clara Cleghorn Hoffman.
- Mary Seymour Howell.
- Laura M. Johns.
- Effie McCollum Jones.
- Rosalie Gardiner Jones.
- Fola La Follette.
- Lora La Mance.
- Julia Lathrop.
- Lena Morrow Lewis.
- Mary Livermore.
- Anna A. Maley.
- Maud Leonard McCreery.
- James T. McCrory.
- Catharine Waugh McCulloch.
- Maria S. McMahon.
- Helen Guthrie Miller.
- Josephine Miller.
- Julia Bullard Nelson.
- Anna Dickie Olesen.
- Mabeth Hurd Paige.
- Perle Penfield.
- Liba Peshakova.
- Mary Elizabeth Pidgeon.
- Jane Pincus.
- Anita Pollitzer.
- Helen G. Putnam.
- Nell Richardson.
- Anna Howard Shaw.
- Lulu L. Shepard.
- Nettie Rogers Shuler.
- Ida M. Stadie.
- Elizabeth Cady Stanton.
- Rene E.H. Stevens.
- Ella S. Stewart.
- Sylvanus A. Stockwell.
- Lucy Stone.
- Ezra B. Taylor.
- Anna Ursin.
- Mabel Vernon.
- Gertrude von Petzold.
- Sena Hartzell Wallace.
- Gertrude Watkins.
- Marguerite Milton Wells.
- Margaret Whittemore.

== Publications ==
- South Dakota Messenger.

== Anti-suffragists ==
Groups

- South Dakota Association Opposed to Woman Suffrage.

People

- Edward Dietrich.
- Ethel Jacobsen (Pierre).
- Henry Schlichting (Deadwood).

Anti-suffragists campaigning in South Dakota

- Minnie Bronson.
- Charles McLean.
- Lucy Price.

== See also ==
- Timeline of women's suffrage in South Dakota
- Women's suffrage in South Dakota
- Women's suffrage in states of the United States
- Women's suffrage in the United States
