= Women's suffrage in South Dakota =

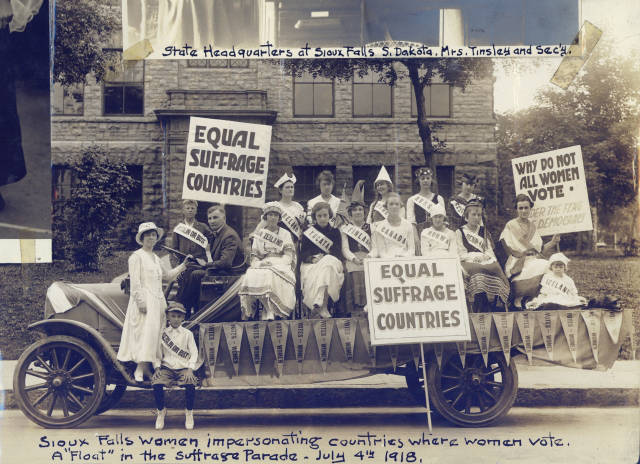
Sioux Falls women's suffrage parade "float" July 4, 1918

Women's suffrage started in South Dakota when it was part of Dakota Territory. Prior to 1889, it had a shared history of women's suffrage with North Dakota. While South Dakota was part of the territory, women earned the right to vote on school related issues. They retained this right after it became a separate state. The state constitution specified that there would be a women's suffrage amendment referendum in 1890. Despite a large campaign that included Susan B. Anthony and a state suffrage group, the South Dakota Equal Suffrage Association (SDESA), the referendum failed. The state legislature passed additional suffrage referendums over the years, but each was voted down until 1918. South Dakota was an early ratifier of the Nineteenth Amendment, which was approved during a special midnight legislative session on December 4, 1919.

== Territorial Dakota ==
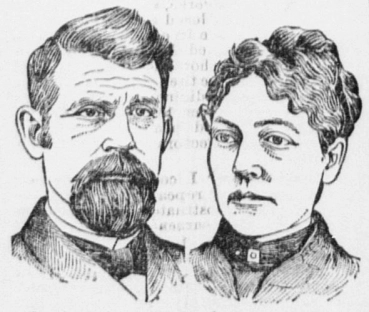
John and Alice Pickler March 20, 1890

Women's suffrage in North Dakota started in the Dakota Territory. One of the earliest efforts to grant women full suffrage was proposed in the Territorial House by Enos Stutsman in 1868. Stutsman's bill passed the house but did not pass the full legislative session. In 1872 another full women's suffrage bill nearly passed the Territorial Legislature, only failing by one vote in 1872.

Women were allowed to vote in school meetings in Dakota Territory starting in 1879. In 1883, changes made to the law specified that women would use separate ballots to vote for school issues. This caused a disruption for women voters in some areas of the territory. During the summer of 1883, Matilda Joslyn Gage lectured in the Dakota Territory on women's suffrage. During the Sioux Falls territorial convention held in the fall, suffragists presented a petition for women's suffrage that was signed by more than 1,000 people.

During the next territorial legislative session in 1885, John Pickler introduced a full women's suffrage bill in the House. Pickler was known as "Petticoats Pickler," because both he and his wife, Alice M. Alt Pickler fought for the vote. The bill passed both the House and the Territorial Council, but was vetoed by Governor Gilbert A. Pierce.

The American Woman Suffrage Association (AWSA) held a convention in Minneapolis in October of 1885 where many Dakota suffragists attended. The Picklers attended the convention, where John discussed the loss of the suffrage bill. The first women's suffrage club in the territory was formed in Webster by Marietta Bones shortly after the convention. Several other suffrage organizations were also created in the southern part of the territory.

In the next legislative session in 1887, a bill expanding the ability of women to vote in school elections was passed. Also that year, the franchise department of the Woman's Christian Temperance Union (WCTU), made up of Helen M. Barker, Alice Pickler, and S. V. Wilson presented petitions for full women's suffrage to the territorial legislature. The legislature considered a full equal suffrage bill, but it did not pass. WCTU members, including Barker and Philena Everett Johnson, returned to Bismarck to set up headquarters in 1889.

When the Dakota Territory was admitted as two states to the United States in 1889, two distinct suffrage movements emerged.

== Early efforts ==
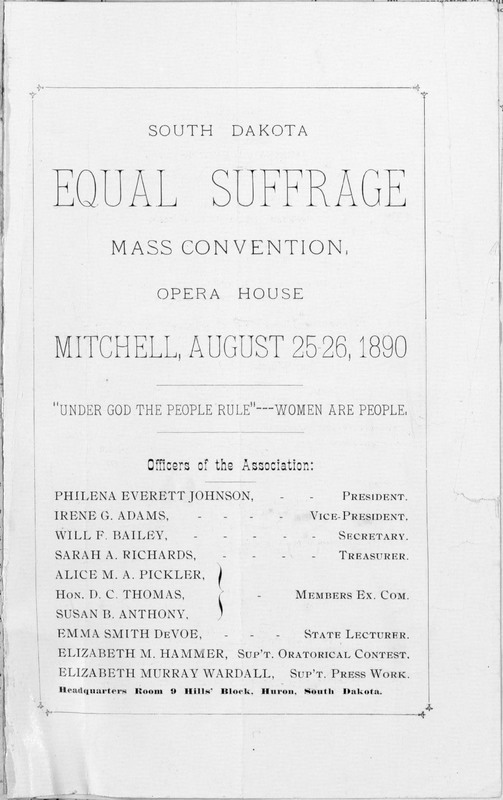
South Dakota Equal Suffrage Mass Convention August 1890

When South Dakota was admitted as a state on November 2, 1889, the new constitution required that a women's suffrage referendum be submitted to the voters by the first legislature, leading to a Fall 1890 constitutional amendment proposal. Plans to organize and campaign started to emerge. Emma Smith DeVoe and her husband, John, founded the South Dakota Equal Suffrage Association (SDESA) on October 21, 1889. Emma DeVoe helped create chapters around the state before she and her husband moved. The motto of the organization was based on the state motto: "Under God the People Rule; Women are People." The group did not have a large amount of funding and set about to securing sources of funding. Susan B. Anthony came to South Dakota to do a lecture tour, starting on November 11, 1889.

Suffragists had support of the WCTU, the Farmers' Alliance, and the Knights of Labor for the upcoming referendum. By February of 1890, the national suffrage leaders decided to help fund the campaign. The liquor interests in the state put a strong campaign against women's suffrage. During the campaign, Marietta Bones and Anthony publicly disagreed about separating prohibition from women's suffrage in the campaign. This public fight allowed the press to make fun of the suffragists throughout the campaign, though L. Frank Baum "was highly critical of the adverse press coverage" and supported women's suffrage in the press. In April of 1890 Anthony returned to South Dakota to establish suffrage campaign headquarters in Huron. Anthony worked with DeVoe during this time. DeVoe went to organize activists in the Black Hills in early May. However suffragists in Aberdeen were not happy with Anthony and the press reflected this, stating that "Miss Anthony seems to have been an element of discord ever since she stepped foot in our state," according to the Aberdeen Saturday Pioneer. During the state suffrage convention in July, the tensions between Anthony and other suffragists made the news. After the convention, Anthony supporters asked the original members of SDESA to resign and created a new group with the same name and new officers.

During the campaign during a hot and dry 1890 summer, there were 789 national speakers and 707 state speakers on women's suffrage. The WCTU also brought in 104 speakers. Many of the speakers were well-known activists such as Henry Browne Blackwell, Carrie Chapman Catt, and Anna Howard Shaw. Speakers often had to drive 20 miles between morning and evening sessions and some audiences would drive 30 miles to listen. In August, suffragists requested access to the Republican Political nominating convention held in Mitchell. Anthony and Anna Howard Shaw were given access, but were placed in the back of the hall and were not able to address the convention. John Pickler, however did mention women's suffrage in his acceptance speech when he was nominated for United States representative. When the Farmer's Alliance and the Knights of Labor formed an independent part that did not include women's suffrage in their party platform. By August, the main political parties in South Dakota were not in support of women's suffrage. On November 4, 1890, the women's suffrage amendment was defeated soundly in South Dakota.

Activists decided to push for increases in school suffrage rights. Officers of SDESA, Anna R. Simmons and Emma Amelia Cranmer lobbied for a bill so that women could vote for state and county superintendents. The bill passed in the 1893 legislature and went out as a referendum to be voted on in November of 1894. The vote did not pass. Simmons and Cranmer worked on another bill in 1897. Laura Gregg came to help campaign in the state. The referendum took place in 1898 and was defeated again. After this defeat, women's suffrage was mostly inactive until 1901.

== Continued efforts ==
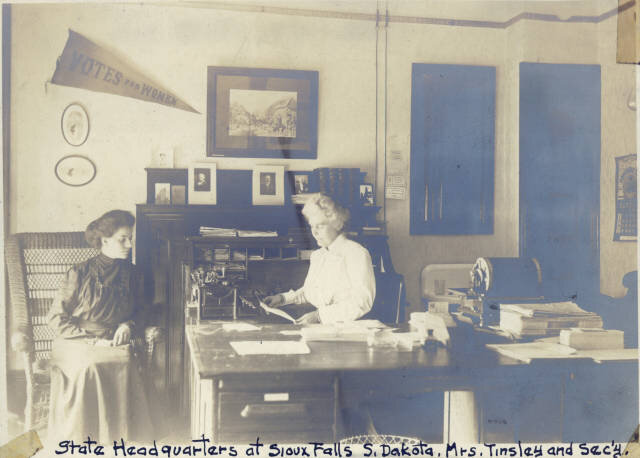
State Headquarters at Sioux Falls S. Dakota, Mrs. Tinsley and Sec'y taken before 1918

In 1901, Anna Pickler and Philena Everett Johnson started the South Dakota Political Equality Association (SDPEA). Pickler called for a suffrage convention to be held in Watertown in October of 1902. Activists decided to petition the state for a constitutional amendment for women's suffrage. They started the petition on the mistaken assumption that they could petition for an amendment, which was not part of South Dakota law. While the secretary of state, O. C. Berg, could not legally receive the petition submitted in 1903, he was personally supportive of women's suffrage. Pickler and Anna R. Simmons, president of the South Dakota WCTU, continued work educating people in the state about women's suffrage. In 1906, they petitioned the state legislature to consider women's suffrage during the next legislative session. Activists from both SDPEA and the WCTU lobbied for a women's suffrage amendment referendum in 1909. The current governor, Robert S. Vessey, was supportive of the women's vote and signed the legislation for the referendum, which would be voted on in November 1910. Despite an "active campaign," the referendum was defeated.

After 1910, Mamie Shields Pyle became a major leader in the South Dakota suffrage movement. The South Dakota Universal Franchise League (SDUFL) was organized in September of 1911. The SDUFL was a reorganization of the former state suffrage association. The state was divided into campaign districts with May Billinghurst, Susie Bird, Edith M. Fitch, and Katherine Powell, serving as chairs who organized smaller clubs in their districts. Pyle made sure that the organization would not be associated with temperance or other controversial issues. The SDUFL also sponsored a newspaper called the South Dakota Messenger. Pyle knew that anti-suffrage propaganda, especially women who promoted it "could be the deadliest deterrent" of achieving suffrage goals in the state.

During a state suffrage convention in July 1912 in Huron, Pyle called for activists to lobby the next legislative session to pass a women's suffrage amendment. Pyle was very successful in getting members of the state legislature to meet with the legislative committee of SDUFL. A bill for a referendum on a women's suffrage amendment was the first to pass in the 1913 legislative session.

A state suffrage amendment was going to be voted on in November of 1914, and this was Pyle's first major campaign. Anti suffragists had a strong opposition and had the support of the National Association Opposed to Woman Suffrage. Suffragists used the Messenger as a method to educate voters in the state about women's suffrage. The Messenger had a large circulation and helped activists reach out to all areas of South Dakota. Even though the amendment didn't pass, there was an increase in the number of people supporting women's suffrage. Democratic, Progressive, and Republican parties came out in favor of women's suffrage by the end of 1914.

In 1915, the legislative committee members of the SDUFL, Mabel Rewman and Etta Estey Boyce were successful in lobbying the state legislature on women's suffrage. In the winter of 1915, the legislature passed a state women's suffrage amendment which would go out for a voter referendum in November 1916. In addition to the suffrage amendment, was also an amendment for state prohibition, as well as seven other issues. At the end of July, Elsie Lincoln Benedict and Effie McCollum Jones arrived in South Dakota to campaign for women's suffrage. At the same time, anti-suffragists were organizing throughout the state. They affiliated with the National Association Opposed to Woman Suffrage (NAOWS) and published a newspaper called the South Dakota Anti-Suffragist. Women's involvement in opposing women's suffrage helped to reassert the idea that women really didn't want to vote. The vote on the suffrage referendum was defeated, though by a much smaller margin than before. The prohibition measure did pass, which meant that liquor interests would no longer lobby against women's suffrage in the state.

During World War I, suffragists used suspicions against German and other European immigrants in South Dakota as a way to promote their cause. Anna Howard Shaw used this division to promote the vote for "native-born women" over immigrant men. In the early twentieth century, it was true that many German and German-Russian immigrants were historically opposed to women's suffrage in the state. Pyle also worked with Governor Peter Norbeck to find ways to curtail the voting rights of resident aliens, including German immigrants, in the state. A new full women's suffrage amendment, called Amendment E or the Citizenship Amendment, was proposed that would also include the provisions that voters must be American citizens and that women citizens could vote. Because women's suffrage was tied into citizenship, Anti-suffragists had a difficult time campaigning against the bill because it made them look pro-German. The Citizenship Amendment passed with a 64 percent vote on November 6, 1918.

== Nineteenth Amendment ==
South Dakota activists wanted the state to be one of the first to ratify the Nineteenth Amendment and urged Governor Norbeck to call a special legislative session. Norbeck agreed as long as the legislators paid for their own transportation to the state capital. The South Dakota legislature ratified the amendment during a "special midnight session" on December 4, 1919 at 12:44 am.

== Native American suffrage ==
In 1890, South Dakota voted not to block Native Americans to vote in the state. Anna Howard Shaw was upset about this because in the same election, the voters had denied women's suffrage. However, this small win for Native Americans wasn't well-sustained. White politicians worked to limit citizenship and voting rights to Native Americans. When the Indian Citizenship Act was passed in 1924, the state refused to comply with the law until the 1940s. Some areas of South Dakota, including Todd, Ogala Lakota, and Washabaugh Counties continued to be disenfranchised until 1974.

== Anti-suffragism in South Dakota ==
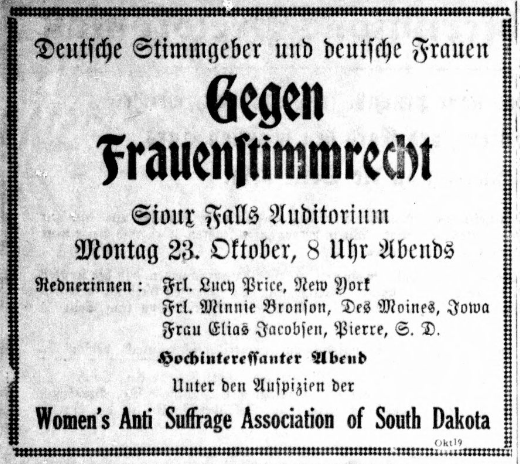
German Anti-Suffrage event ad in Sioux Falls in the Deutscher Herold, October 19, 1916

Many immigrants in South Dakota were bitterly opposed to women's suffrage during the first women's suffrage amendment campaign in 1890. During the Republican Convention held in 1890, a large group of Russian immigrants wore buttons that read, "Against Woman Suffrage and Susan B. Anthony." German immigrants were also largely against women voting. Liquor and gambling interests were also against women's suffrage. These groups spread the idea that women really didn't want to or need to vote and get into politics.

In the 1910s, anti-suffrage efforts became more organized. Two major anti-suffragists were brewers, Henry Schlichting and Edward Dietrich. They often took credit for defeats of women's suffrage efforts in the state. The Society Opposed to the Further Extension of Suffrage to Women sent propaganda and anti-suffrage speakers to the state. In 1916, the anti-suffragists officially became an auxiliary of the National Association Opposed to Woman Suffrage (NAOWS).

== See also ==
- List of South Dakota suffragists
- Timeline of women's suffrage in South Dakota
- Women's suffrage in states of the United States
- Women's suffrage in the United States
