= Hipple =

Hipple is an American surname originating from the German and Dutch surname Hippel. It may refer to the following notable people:

- Eric Hipple (born 1957), American football player and public speaker
- Hugh Marlowe (Hugh Herbert Hipple, 1911–1982), American film, television, stage and radio actor
- Ruth B. Hipple (1873–1962), American suffragist
  - John E. and Ruth Hipple House in Pierre, South Dakota, U.S.
