= Timeline of women's suffrage in South Dakota =

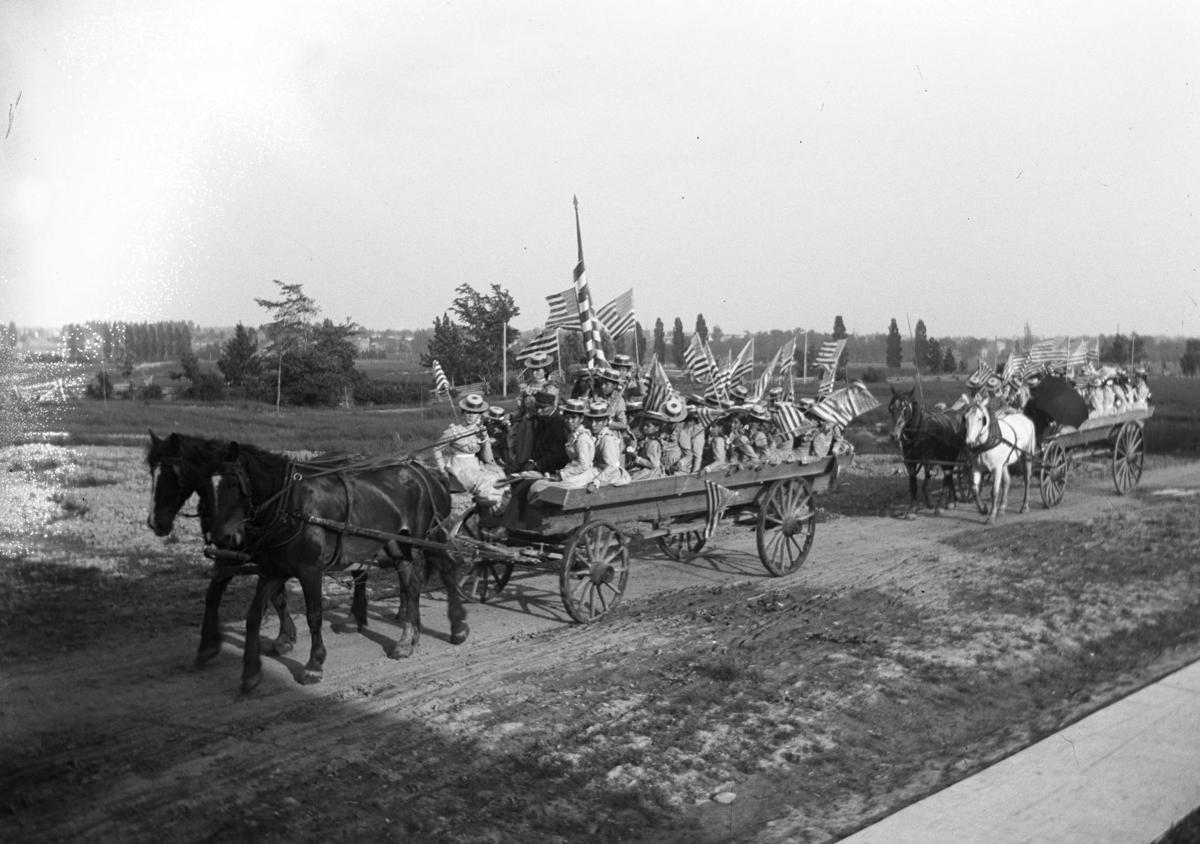
South Dakota suffragists

This is a timeline of women's suffrage in South Dakota. The early history of women's suffrage in the state is shared with North Dakota. When South Dakota became a state, it held a voter referendum in 1890 on an equal suffrage amendment. This effort failed, but suffragists continued to organize and lobby the legislature to pass voter referendums. None passed until 1918. South Dakota ratified the Nineteenth Amendment on December 4, 1919.

== 19th century ==
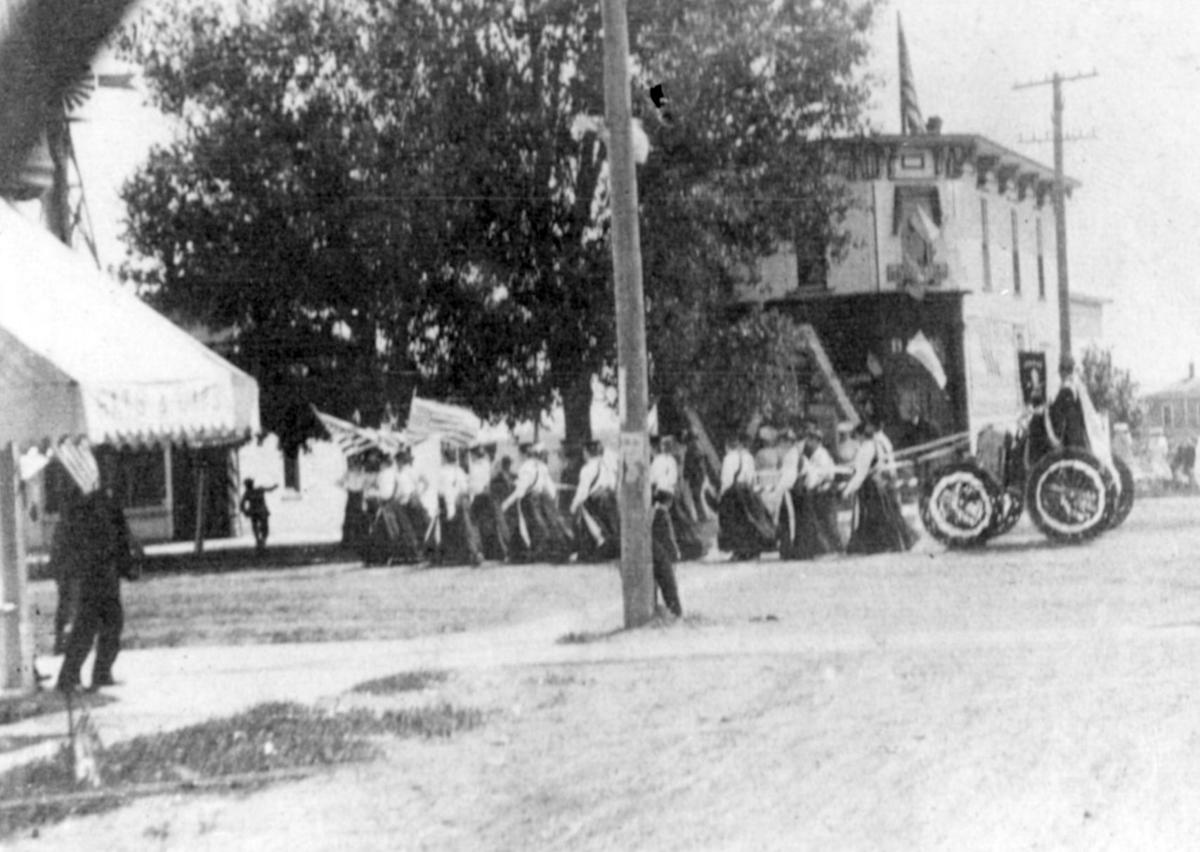
South Dakota suffragists

=== 1860s ===
1868

- Enos Stutsman proposes a women's suffrage bill in the Dakota Territorial House.

=== 1870s ===
1872

- The Territorial Legislature nearly passes a full women's suffrage bill, losing by one vote.

1879

- The Dakota Territory gives women the right to vote in school meetings.

=== 1880s ===
1881

- Women are allowed to become county superintendents of public education.

1883

- A change in the way people would vote on school issues disenfranchised many women voters in the territory. The Territory wanted women to use separate ballots for school issues.
- Summer: Matilda Joslyn Gage lectures on women's suffrage in the territory.
- September 6: A women's suffrage petition signed by 1,000 people was presented to the Sioux Falls convention that was deciding whether or not to split the territory.

1884

- The South Dakota Republican Party adopts universal suffrage in their party platform.

1885

- Activists in the southern part of the Dakota territory, working with the Woman's Christian Temperance Union (WCTU), work on petitions to influence the territorial legislature to support women's suffrage.
- John Pickler proposes a women's suffrage bill in the Territorial House, which passed. It is vetoed by Governor Gilbert A. Pierce.
- Marietta Bones starts a suffrage organization in Webster.

1887

- A school suffrage bill expanding the rights of women to vote for all kinds of school issues passes.
- A full women's suffrage bill is proposed, but does not pass the territorial legislature.

1888

- A call for a women's suffrage group was put out in Grand Forks. On April 12, a meeting was held to form a women's suffrage group that had a packed crowd.

1889

- After the Dakota territory is admitted as two states, two distinct women's suffrage movements emerge.
- October 21: The South Dakota Equal Suffrage Association (SDESA) is formed in Huron by Emma Smith DeVoe and her husband, John.
- November 11: Susan B. Anthony starts a lecture tour in South Dakota.

=== 1890s ===
1890

- February: The Picklers and Alonzo Wardall ask NWSA for organizers and funds for the upcoming suffrage campaign.
- June: Sophia M. Harden and other activists speak for women's suffrage at the state Democratic Party convention at Aberdeen.
- July 7–8: The SDESA holds a state suffrage convention in Huron.
- August 25–26: SDESA holds a second women's suffrage convention in Mitchell in order to strategize for the upcoming women's suffrage referendum vote.
- August 27: Suffrage leaders are able to speak at the Republican party convention in Mitchell.
- August: A suffrage convention was held in Grant County. The Grant County Equal Suffrage Association is formed.
- November 4: The women's suffrage amendment is defeated.
- The Athol Equal Suffrage Association is created.
- The Grant County Equal Suffrage Association is formed.

1892

- The Prohibition Party passed resolutions for equal suffrage and equal pay.
- State suffrage convention was held in Huron.

1893

- A women's suffrage amendment bill is lobbied for and passed in the state legislature.
- July 4: Suffragists in Onida raise money for campaigns in Colorado, Kansas, and New York.
- September: SDESA holds its annual meeting in Aberdeen.

1894

- November: The state women's suffrage amendment is defeated.

1895

- September 16–17: WCTU and SDESA hold annual conventions in Pierre.

1896

- December 3–4: SDESA holds their annual convention in Salem.

1897

- October: The Union County Equal Suffrage Association is formed.
- Suffragists work towards influencing the state legislature to pass another state amendment bill.

1898

- July: Anna Simmons and Enma Cranmer lead the Equal Suffrage Day at Lake Madison Chautauqua.
- November: The state women's suffrage amendment was defeated.

1899

- September: SDESA holds a joint convention with the state WCTU in Madison.

== 20th century ==
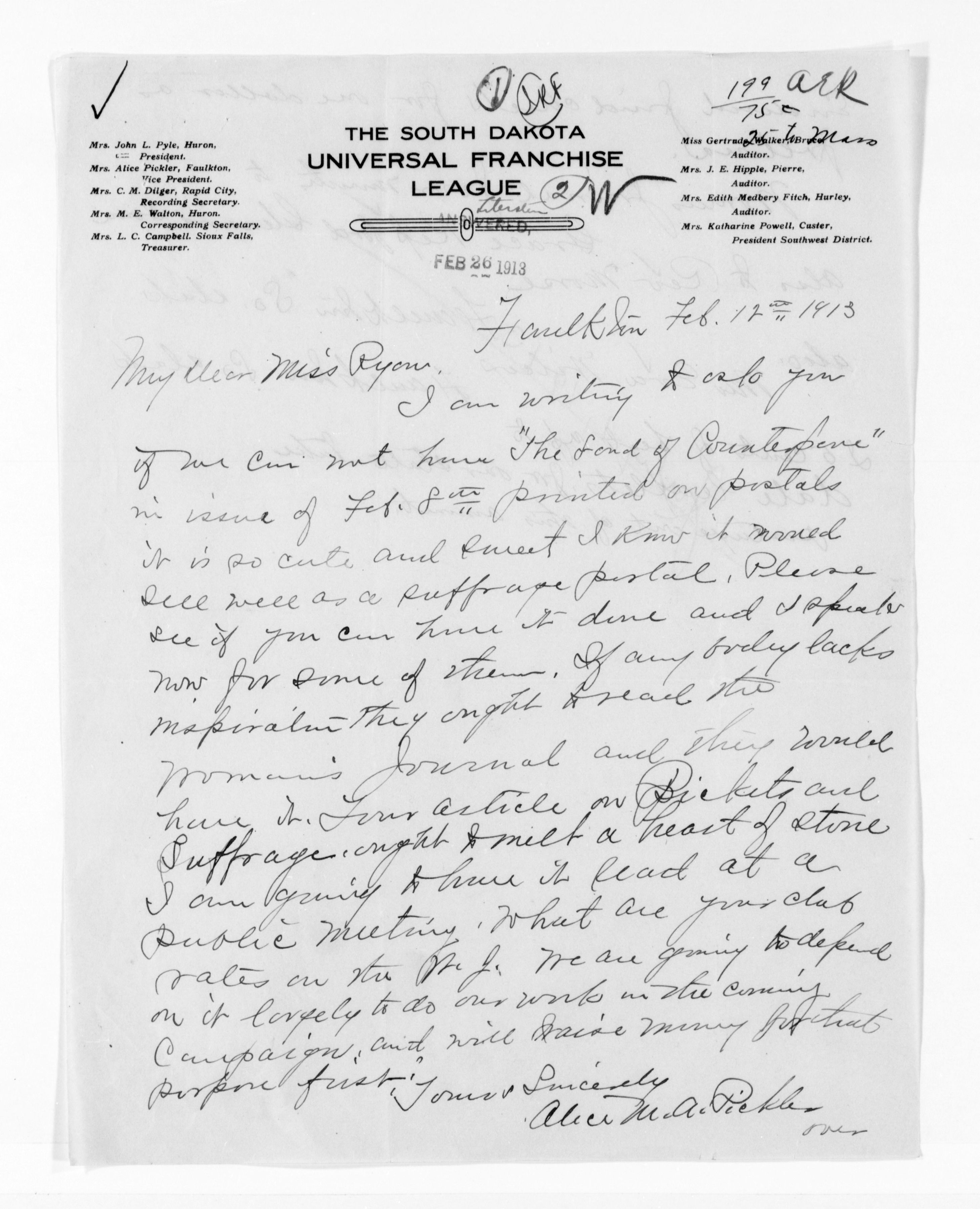
Letter from Alice M. A. Pickler, South Dakota Universal Franchise League February 26, 1913

=== 1900s ===
1900

- January 15: U.S. Senator, R. F. Pettigrew presents a petition for a federal suffrage amendment to the U.S. Senate.
- September: SDESA holds their annual meeting in Brookings.

1901

- The South Dakota Political Equality Association (SDPEA) is formed.
- February 1: State WCTU members, Luella Ramsey and Philena Everett Johnson lobby for a state suffrage amendment.
- Spring: SDESA organizes local Political Equality Clubs to help distribute literature and better reach more women.

1902

- Women's suffrage convention called to be held in Watertown in October.

1903

- Women's suffrage petition for a state suffrage amendment is rejected by the secretary of state.

1904

- The South Dakota Prohibition Party's platform includes equal women's suffrage.

1906

- Suffragists petition the state legislature to consider women's suffrage.

1907

- March: The business committee of SDESA meets in Highmore.
- September 17–18: SDESA holds its annual meeting in Pierre.

1908

- SDESA raises money by the foot, literally asking people to send them enough pennies to fit on twelves inches of cardboard.

1909

- Suffragists petition the state legislature to pass a women's suffrage amendment referendum.
- June 18: SDESA holds their suffrage convention in Aberdeen.
- November 3–5: The state suffrage convention is held in Sioux Falls.

=== 1910s ===
1910

- The Philip Suffrage Club is organized in Philip.
- A major suffrage campaign is enacted, bringing in activists from around the state and country, including Anna Howard Shaw.
- November: The women's suffrage referendum is defeated.

1911

- January: Activists lobby the state legislature on women's suffrage.
- February: Suffragists put forward the idea that the state constitution already allowed state and county offices.
- The South Dakota Universal Franchise League is formed by Mamie Shields Pyle.

1912

- January: Pro-suffrage newspaper, South Dakota Messenger, is first published.
- July: A state suffrage convention is held in Huron.

1913

- The women's suffrage amendment bill is the first to pass the legislative session.
- March: South Dakota is represented in the Woman Suffrage Procession by marchers and a golden chariot.
- July: SDUFL holds their annual meeting in Huron.

1915

- Winter: A women's suffrage amendment is passed by the state legislature and will go to a voter referendum.

1916

- Anti-suffragists become an auxiliary of the National Association Opposed to Woman Suffrage (NAOWS).
- August 7: Suffrage Day is celebrated in South Dakota.
- October: The South Dakota Association Opposed to Woman Suffrage began an anti-suffrage campaign that included Minnie Bronson.
- November: Voter referendum on the women's suffrage amendment does not pass, but more people support women's suffrage this time.

1918

- November 6: Women's suffrage passes with the passage of the Citizenship Amendment.

1919

- December 4: South Dakota ratifies the Nineteenth Amendment.

=== 1920s ===
1924

- The Indian Citizenship Act is passed, but South Dakota refuses to follow the law and allow Native Americans, as U.S. Citizens to vote.

== See also ==
- List of South Dakota suffragists
- Women's suffrage in South Dakota
- Women's suffrage in states of the United States
- Women's suffrage in the United States
