= Capital Journal =

Newspaper in Pierre, South Dakota

- Type: Daily newspaper
- Owner: Forum Communications Company
- Founded: 1881; 145 years ago
- Language: English
- Headquarters: Pierre, South Dakota
- Circulation: 2,932 (as of 2015)
- ISSN: 0893-5564
- Website: capjournal.com

The Capital Journal is a newspaper in Pierre, South Dakota, founded in 1881. It serves the South Dakota capital city of Pierre and the surrounding region, including Fort Pierre. As of December 2012, it reported a daily circulation of 10,750, with new issues published Monday through Friday (except Christmas Day and New Year's Day). It has been the official printed record of Hughes and Stanley counties in South Dakota since the year of its founding.

== History ==
In 1898, Charles H. Anderson acquired the Pierre Journal and the Daily Capital, and then merged the two to form the Capital Journal. Soon the Capital Journal Company was formed. Fred Denton was connected with the paper for a decade until 1901, when he sold his stock to Mr. Bartlett and S.A. Travis.

In 1905, John E. Hipple purchased the Capital Journal. He was elected town mayor in 1923, unsuccessfully ran for governor in 1926, and died in 1939 at age 74. He was succeeded as publisher by his son Robert B. Hipple. In 1955, J.E. Hipple was inducted into the South Dakota Newspaper Hall of Fame. In 1962, his widow Ruth B. Hipple died. In 1989, R.B. Hipple retired, was succeeded by his son John Hipple, and later died in 2000 at age 100. The paper was acquired by Wick Communications in 2005 from Terry and Kevin Hipple, and later sold to Forum Communications Company in 2026.

== Notable staff ==
Grand Forks Herald columnist Marilyn Hagerty began her journalism career with the paper while still in high school.
