= Marilyn Hagerty =

American journalist (1926–2025)

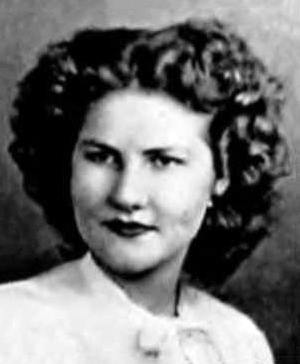
- Hansen in 1946
- Born: Marilyn Gail Hansen; May 30, 1926; Pierre, South Dakota, U.S.
- Died: September 16, 2025 (aged 99); Grand Forks, North Dakota, U.S.
- Education: University of South Dakota
- Occupation: Newspaper columnist
- Spouse: Jack Hagerty (m. 1949; died 1997)
- Children: 3
- Awards: Al Neuharth Award for Excellence in the Media (2012)

Marilyn Gail Hagerty (née Hansen; May 30, 1926 – September 16, 2025) was an American newspaper columnist, writing for the Grand Forks Herald from 1957 to 2024. Her March 2012 review of the new Olive Garden restaurant in Grand Forks, North Dakota went viral when it was at first derided before gaining a supportive following, including from Anthony Bourdain. Her reviews were collected in a 2013 book, Grand Forks: A History of American Dining in 128 Reviews, with a foreword by Bourdain.

She was awarded the 2012 Al Neuharth Award for Excellence in the Media, the UND Spirit Award, bestowed by the UND Alumni Association and Foundation in 2017, and an honorary degree from the University of North Dakota in Grand Forks in 2021.

== Early life ==
Hagerty was born Marilyn Hansen in Pierre, South Dakota, and of Danish American descent. She married her husband Jack on June 19, 1949.

== Career ==
Hagerty began her career in the 1940s as a high school student working for the Capital Journal in Pierre, South Dakota. She graduated with a degree in journalism from the University of South Dakota, where she also wrote for their paper.

She wrote her first article for the Grand Forks Herald in 1957, and became a regular contributor to the paper two years later.

She wrote five columns for the paper, and did not consider herself a food critic.She retired from full-time writing in 1991, but soon came back with a part-time schedule but a full-time workload, until she wrote her last article for the paper in 2024.

She received the 2012 Al Neuharth Award for Excellence in the Media. Neuharth noted that Hagerty hired him for his first newspaper job at the University of South Dakota newspaper. In 2017, the UND Alumni Association and Foundation bestowed the UND Spirit Award upon Hagerty. She was awarded an honorary degree from the University of North Dakota in Grand Forks in 2021.

She appeared as a guest judge on the Top Chef: Seattle episode "Even the Famous Come Home".

=== Viral Olive Garden review ===
Hagerty wrote a review for her "Eatbeat" column in March 2012 of a recently opened Olive Garden restaurant in Grand Forks, calling it "the largest and most beautiful restaurant now operating in Grand Forks". The review noted the chicken alfredo was "warm and comforting on a cold day". Blogs started linking to the review the day after it was published, due to the novelty of an unironic, seemingly positive review of a chain restaurant. Hagerty said she was unfazed by the attention in an interview, though she found much of it "rather condescending". She appeared on Anderson, and was interviewed on CNN and ABC.

Her son James, a reporter for The Wall Street Journal, wrote about her newfound fame, noting that "she doesn't like to say anything bad" in her reviews, and if her reviews mention the decor more than the food, "you might want to eat somewhere else".

Her book was published by Bourdain's imprint Anthony Bourdain/Ecco Books.

== Personal life ==
She and her husband had two daughters in addition to her son James: Gail and Carol. The couple evacuated to the Bismarck-Mandan area during the 1997 Red River flood, where Jack died in 1997.

She was reported to be recovering from an unspecified medical procedure in September 2021, at the age of 95. She died at a hospital in Grand Forks on September 16, 2025 at the age of 99, from complications related to a stroke.

== Bibliography ==
Three collections of Hagerty's columns have been published:

- Echoes: A Selection of Stories and Columns by Marilyn Hagerty (1994, 246 pages, ISBN 0964286009)
- The Best of The Eatbeat with Marilyn Hagerty (2012, self-published e-book, ASIN B007JMW8GQ)
- Grand Forks: A History of American Dining in 128 Reviews (2013, ISBN 9780062228895, foreword by Anthony Bourdain)
