= James D. Graham =

American trade unionist

- Born: February 2, 1873; Greenock, Scotland, UK
- Died: June 9, 1951 (aged 78); Helena, Montana, USA
- Occupation: Trade union functionary

James D. Graham (1873-1951), was a Scottish-born American trade union leader and socialist politician. Graham is best remembered as the longtime leader of the Montana Federation of Labor (MFL) and the Socialist Party of Montana, state affiliate of the Socialist Party of America, during the first decades of the 20th century. He would serve as president of the MFL for two decades.

== Biography ==
=== Early years ===
James D. Graham was born February 2, 1873, in the coastal town of Greenock, Scotland, the son of a machinist named Michael Graham and his wife, the former Elizabeth Mann Denholm.

The family would emigrate together to the United States of America in 1889, when James was 16. The family settled in Livingston, Montana, where Graham's father was employed by the Northern Pacific Railroad.

Graham followed in his father's footsteps during his early American years, taking a job with the Northern Pacific himself as an apprentice machinist. He would eventually become a fully fledged machinist and a member of the International Association of Machinists (IAM) in 1896, remaining active in the organized labor movement for the rest of his life.

Graham married the former Jennie Whyatt in August 1903. The couple would have one child together, a son.

=== Trade union functionary ===
The younger Graham was drawn to self-education, attending night school and taking correspondence courses, in the process reading extensively in the fields of engineering, history, law, and economics, gaining particular expertise in the field of labor economics. He worked for a time as a regional organizer for the United Brotherhood of Railway Employees. This background ultimately proved a springboard to employment as a top official of the International Hod Carriers, Building and Common Laborers Union of America, part of the American Federation of Labor.

Around 1900 Graham was named the editor of Montana Labor News, the official newspaper of the Montana Federation of Labor (MFL), beginning what would be for him a lifetime career as a state-level trade union functionary. Graham was elected to the governing executive board of the MFL in 1901.

=== Socialist politician ===
From 1905 to 1908 Graham was the business manager of Montana News, weekly organ of the Socialist Party of Montana.

Graham was a member of the so-called Chicago wing of the Social Democratic Party of America (SDP) in the late 1890s, serving as a presidential elector on the Montana ballot in support of SDP nominee Eugene V. Debs in the 1900 Presidential election. He would become a founding member of the Socialist Party of America (SPA) in 1901.

Graham was involved in Socialist Party governance from the time of formation of the Socialist Party of Montana (SPM), state affiliate of the SPA, being elected a member of the organization's governing State Committee in July 1902. As was the case for many socialists of the era, Graham did his part for his political cause by standing for elected office under the party banner, running as a Socialist for police commissioner of Livingston in the city elections of 1903. He was elected State Secretary of the SPM in 1904 and served in that position for a two-year term. Graham again appeared on the ballot in the Livingston city election of 1905, heading the local ticket as the Socialist candidate for mayor.

From 1903 the Socialist Party of Montana was supported by a privately owned weekly newspaper, Montana News. In October 1905, during Graham's tenure as State Secretary, it was decided that the SPM should take over the ownership of this paper and publish it on its own behalf. From November of that year Graham served as business manager of this publication, which was edited his friend and professional state party organizer Ida Crouch-Hazlett. The moderate pair would be sacked from their positions in 1908 as the result of factional politics, amidst charges of financial shenanigans.

During the 1908 Presidential campaign, Graham was a state organizer for the SPA's effort on behalf of Eugene V. Debs, who made a number of speaking stops in the state as part of his whistle stop tour aboard the so-called "Red Special." In December 1908 Graham was again elected as State Secretary of the Socialist Party of Montana. He would remain active in the Socialist Party but saw the party's presence in the mining states of the western United States decline precipitously in the years after World War I, to the point that by 1929 there were a mere 20 members of the Socialist Party of Montana in good standing.

Graham would remain an active member until the party's bitter factional split of 1936. Graham would remain a committed socialist throughout his entire life despite feeling he could no longer lend his support to the SPA as an organization. As part of his life as a political activist, Graham would gain notice as a public advocate for an array of political causes of the Progressive Era, including municipal ownership, women's suffrage, old age pensions, and the broad implementation of the initiative and referendum system.

=== Montana Federation of Labor chief ===
Graham was elected vice president of the MFL in 1927 and made the president of that organization in 1930. He would remain in this position for the last two decades of his life. As head of the MFL, Graham would be instrumental in helping to organize the copper miners of Butte, a multi-year effort that finally gained success in 1933 and 1934.

During the years of the Great Depression, Graham served a six-year stint beginning in 1934 as associate director of the Montana employment service. He would also be drawn into government service as the chair of the Montana Selective Service Appeals Board from 1941 to 1949.

Graham was a lifelong anti-Communist who in his final years was a public advocate of the expulsion of the Soviet Union from the United Nations to end its veto power over that organization's military peacekeeping efforts.

=== Death and legacy ===
James D. Graham died in his hometown of Helena, Montana on June 9, 1951, following a year of serious illness. He was 78 years old at the time of his death.
