= How to Analyze People on Sight =

1921 book by Elsie Lincoln Benedict and Ralph Paine Benedict

- Author: Elsie Lincoln Benedict and Ralph Paine Benedict
- Illustrator: Raymond Haskell Lufkin
- Cover artist: Raymond Haskell Lufkin
- Language: English
- Subject: pseudoscience about relation of psychology and physiology, Psychoanalysis
- Publisher: Roycrofters
- Publication date: June, 1921
- Publication place: East Aurora, New York, Northeastern United States
- Pages: 382
- Text: How to Analyze People on Sight at Wikisource

How to Analyze People on Sight or How to Analyze People on Sight Through the Science of Human Analysis: The Five Human Types is a 1921 book by Elsie Lincoln Benedict and Ralph Paine Benedict. The book is published and bound by the Roycrofters in East Aurora, New York, remains as 7th of the top downloads on Project Gutenberg. It is written version of public lecture of the same name.

== Content ==
In the book, the authors divided all people into five categories based on fat, chest size and the inner lungs and heart, muscles, bones and thinking part of the brain and gave their own description of their mentality and work, and also gave their own research-based advice on social and business deal with them and about their profession and marriage.
