= Linda Slaughter =

- Born: February 1, 1843; Cadiz, Ohio
- Died: July 3, 1911 (aged 68); St. Cloud, Minnesota
- Education: Oberlin College
- Occupations: activist, historian, writer, educator
- Writing career
- Genre: history
- Subjects: Regionalism, American Midwest, education, women's rights, American Indian policy
- Notable works: Early Efforts, The Dolly Varden Letters

Linda Slaughter (February 1, 1843 – July 3, 1911) or Linda Warfel Slaughter was an American historian, journalist, educator, and women's rights activist. She was known for her works on interracial and intercultural encounters in the nineteenth-century Midwest.

== Early life and education ==
Slaughter was born in Cadiz, Ohio on February 1, 1843. Her parents, Charles and Maria Boyd Warfel, believed in education and particularly supported educating women, which allowed Slaughter to complete high school and attend the Oberlin College. Some historians claim that she graduated from college but the records at Oberlin indicate that she did not complete her program and attended only for a few years. Charles, who was a merchant and a veteran of the Mexican-American War, was an abolitionist and influenced Slaughter's early views on the subject.

== Career ==
She wrote pieces advocating emancipation through objective and enthusiastic reports of the Freedmen and their education. At one point, she departed from the abolitionist view, particularly during a point when she called for wars of extermination against the Indians.

=== Author ===
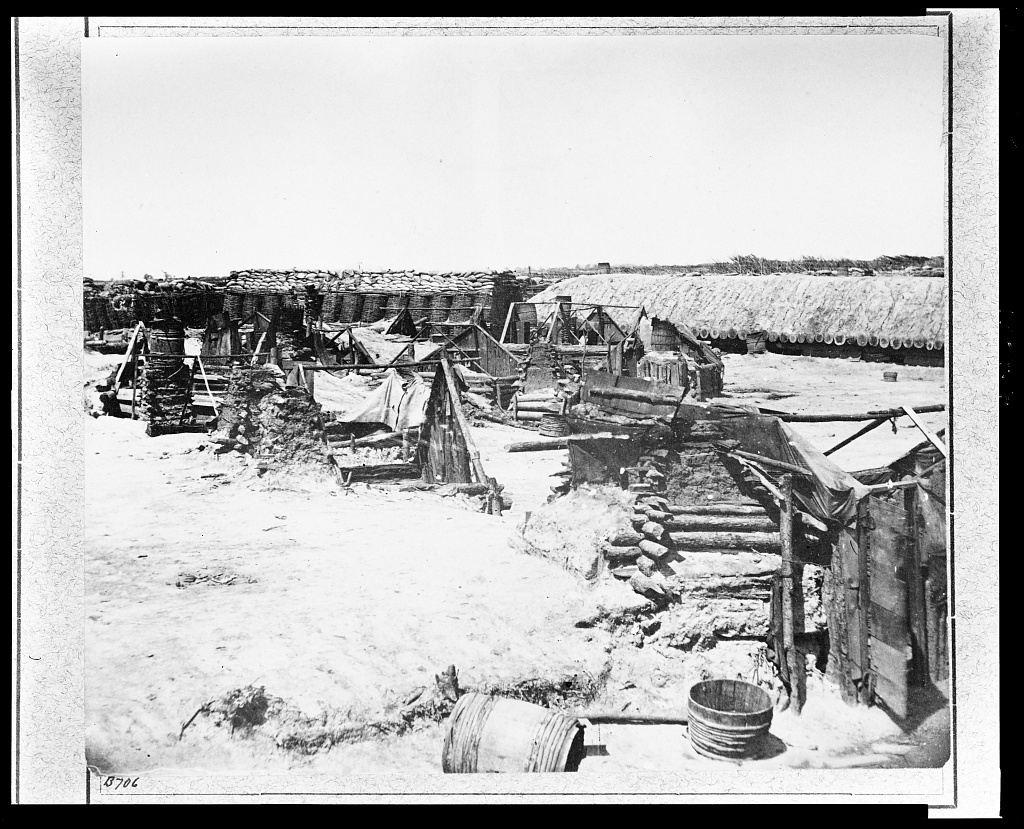
The soldiers' barracks at Fort Rice where Linda Slaughter lived with her husband until 1872.

Slaughter began writing early in her life. She started submitting poetry to magazines and her work during this period was eventually published as the book Early Efforts. She is also known for her accounts of Midwestern regionalism through the letters she wrote covering her experiences in the Dakota Territory during the 1870s. Slaughter started this when she traveled to Fort Rice where her husband was stationed as an officer of the army and was part of the campaign to subdue Indians and establish the federal authority in the West. The couple's children Rosalind, Jessamine, and Linda, were all born at Fort Rice.

Slaughter and her husband settled in Bismarck in 1872. She was an active member of the community and wrote about her experiences there. She began writing for The Bismarck Tribune, where she contributed a regular fiction that also included social commentary covering the military as well as the Indian campaigns. Aside from the social life in Dakota Territory, Slaughter also wrote about her political views. She raised the political aspects of military matters and Indian policy, which are subjects that her husband and other military officers could not speak about.

Slaughter also advocated women's rights in her works. She embraced the women's rights movement and became an important member and officer of the National Woman Suffrage Association (NWSA). Slaughter was also the vice president of the Woman's National Press Association sometime in the late 1880s and participated in the International Council of Women meeting held in 1888. She worked closely with different women's rights activists such as Marietta Bones and was a close acquaintance of the politician Belva Ann Lockwood.

In 1892, Slaughter attended the Populist Party convention and voted for a presidential candidate, making her the first woman to do so in a national convention.

=== Educator ===
Slaughter was also appointed as the superintendent of schools for Burleigh County in 1873, making her the first woman to occupy such position in Dakota Territory. She held the post several more times until 1882. Slaughter also became the Dakota Territory's deputy superintendent of public instruction in 1876. In the year 1873, she also established Bismarck's first school called Bismarck Academy, employing her sister Aidee Warfel as the teacher. She also founded North Dakota's first Sunday school.

== Personal life ==
Slaughter married the physician Benjamin Franklin Slaughter on August 20, 1868. She met her husband, who was a son of a slave-holding planter, at the western district of Kentucky and Tennessee in 1868 while working as a missionary supervisor after the American Civil War. Franklin served in the Union Army during the war and reenlisted in 1870 as an officer.

She died on July 3, 1911, in St. Cloud Minnesota.
