= John E. and Ruth Hipple House =

Historic house in South Dakota, United States

- U.S. National Register of Historic Places
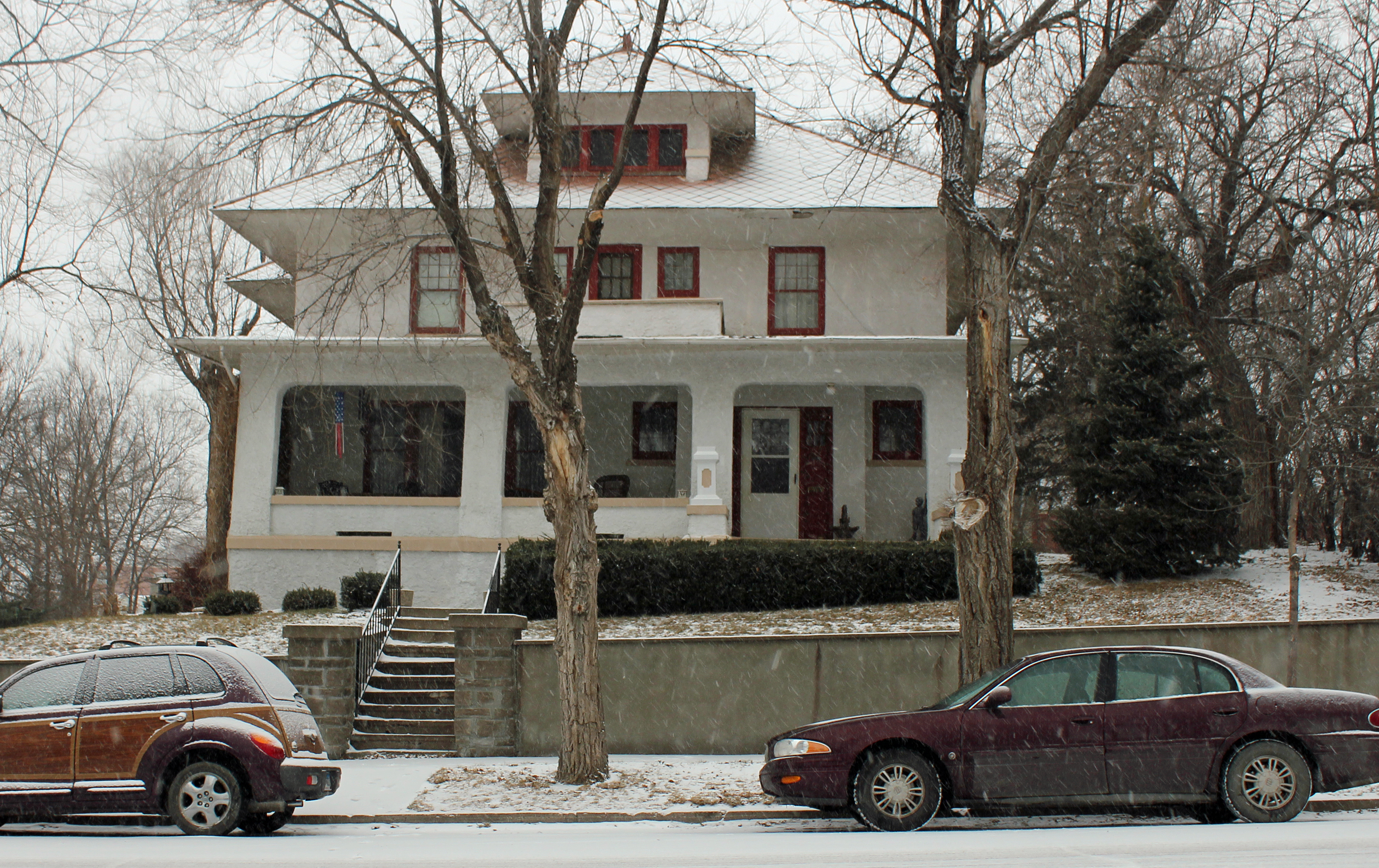

- Location within South Dakota Location within the United States
- Location: 219 N. Highland, Pierre, South Dakota
- Coordinates: 44°22′9″N 100°20′51″W
- Area: less than one acre
- Built: 1913
- Architectural style: Prairie School
- NRHP reference No.: 01000641
- Added to NRHP: June 6, 2001

The John E. and Ruth Hipple House is a historic house located at 219 N. Highland in Pierre, South Dakota, United States. Built in 1913, the Prairie School house features a roof with a low pitch and overhanging eaves, a front porch, and a horizontal emphasis throughout its design. The home was originally owned by John E. and Ruth Hipple, both of whom were prominent Pierre citizens. John served as Pierre's mayor from 1924 to 1939 and owned the Capital Journal, while Ruth was an important figure in the local women's suffrage movement.

The house was added to the National Register of Historic Places on June 6, 2001.
