= Hippel =

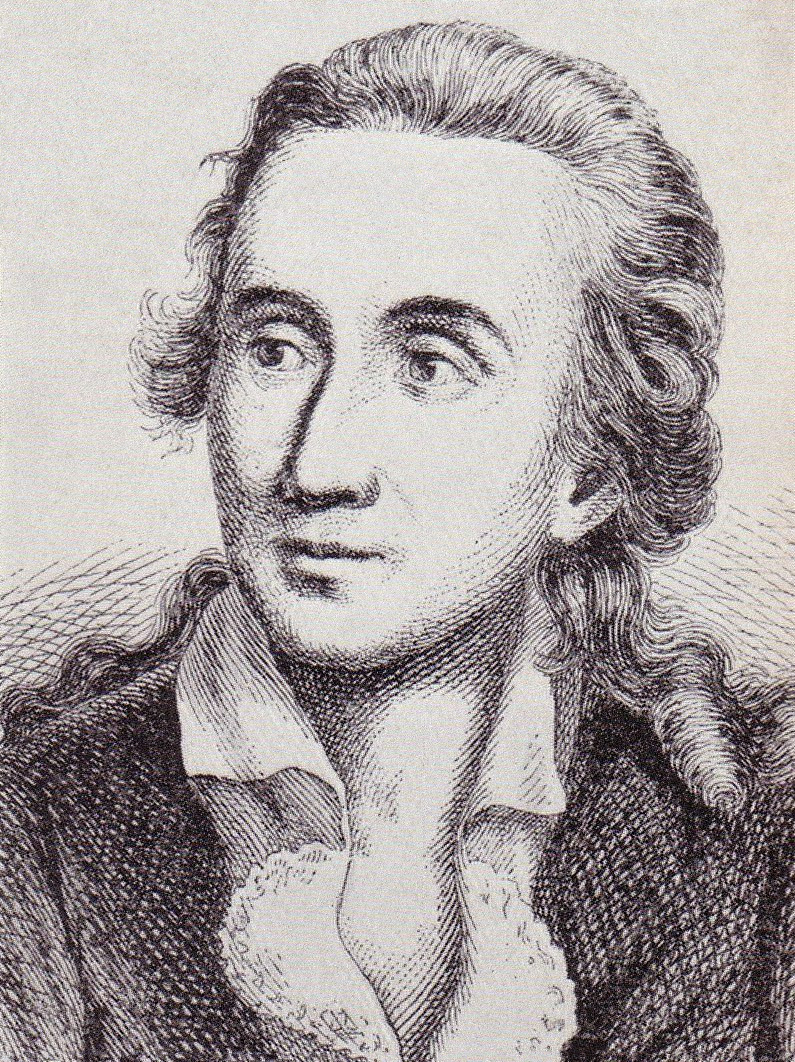
Theodor Gottlieb von Hippel

Hippel, also Hiepel, Von Hippel or Hipel, is a family name of German origin.

== People ==
- Arthur von Hippel (ophthalmologist) (1841–1916), a German ophthalmologist
  - Eugen von Hippel (1867–1939), a German ophthalmologist and author, his son
  - Arthur R. von Hippel (1898–2003), a German-American physicist, his nephew
    - Eric von Hippel (born 1941), an American economist, son of Arthur R. von Hippel
    - Frank N. von Hippel, an American nuclear physicist, son of Arthur R. von Hippel
- Jochen Hippel (born 1971), a German musician and computer programmer
- Theodor Gottlieb von Hippel the Elder (1741–1796), a German satirist
  - Theodor Gottlieb von Hippel the Younger (1775–1843), a Prussian statesman and author, his nephew
- Theodor von Hippel, (1890-?), a German army and intelligence officer during World War II
