= Ida Crouch-Hazlett =

American journalist

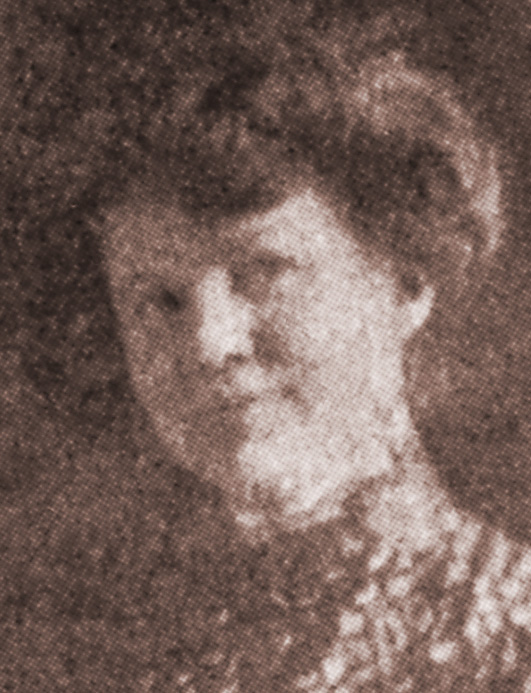
Ida Crouch-Hazlett in 1904, about the time she moved to Lewistown to take over editorship of Montana News.

Ida Crouch-Hazlett (born Ida Estelle Crouch, c. 1870 – 1941) was an American political activist prominent in the suffrage and socialist movements. Crouch-Hazlett is best remembered as a prominent orator and organizer for the Socialist Party of America during the first two decades of the 20th century. In 1902 Crouch-Hazlett became the first female candidate for U.S. Congress from Colorado when she ran for a seat in the House of Representatives.

== Biography ==
=== Early years ===
Ida Estelle Crouch was born c. 1870 in Chicago, Illinois, the daughter of two college-educated schoolteachers. Crouch grew up in Monmouth, Illinois, where she attended elementary school, before enrolling in the Monticello Seminary of Godfrey, Illinois. She was an 1888 graduate of Illinois State Normal School (an institution that would later become Illinois State University) at Bloomington and later did course work at Stanford University, where she studied economics, and the Chicago School of Social Sciences following completion of her training as a teacher at Illinois Normal School.

Crouch was married at a fairly early age to N. Hazlett, who died not long thereafter.

After graduation, Crouch-Hazlett ran for local school board on the ticket of the Prohibition Party. Following that unsuccessful attempt, she held a series of positions as a teacher of elocution in Illinois, Colorado, and Wyoming, an occupation that helped her to craft her skills as an orator.

In 1894, Crouch-Hazlett turned to journalism, working as a newspaper reporter. Crouch-Hazlett worked for newspapers in Chicago, Denver, and Leadville, Colorado, and St. Louis. She continued to work as a journalist through 1900. While in Colorado Crouch-Hazlett was first exposed to the bitter class struggle between miners and mine-owners, which further shaped her political views.

=== Political career ===
Crouch-Hazlett's first foray into politics came in 1896, when she was named a national organizer for the National American Woman Suffrage Association (NAWSA). Crouch-Hazlett was one of the NAWSA's professional organizers who toured the length and breadth of California during the unsuccessful 1896 election campaign, joining such stalwarts of the movement as Susan B. Anthony, Carrie Chapman Catt, and Anna Howard Shaw. Crouch-Hazlett continued on the staff of the NAWSA until 1901, touring the country for the organization and conducting public lectures building public support for women's right to vote.

Shortly after the start of the 20th century, Crouch-Hazlett began to see the fight for socialism as a central component of the struggle of women for equal rights and she made advancement of the socialist movement a central part of her political efforts. She joined the fledgling Socialist Party of America (SPA) around the time of its formation in 1901 and thereafter became one of its most prominent female voices.

In 1902, Hazlett became the first female candidate for U.S. Congress in the state of Colorado when she ran for the House of Representatives on the Socialist ticket.

After the 1902 campaign, Hazlett continued without pause taking her oratorial skills on the road on behalf of the Socialist Party as one of its national organizers. Crouch-Hazlett spent the better part of the next two years, holding public lectures and thereby attempting to help build state and local organizations for the new political party. She remained one of the SPA's touring national organizers through 1904.

Crouch-Hazlett was a delegate of the Socialist Party of Colorado to the 1904 National Convention of the Socialist Party and a Socialist Party of Montana delegate to the 1908 Convention.

Following her time as a Socialist Party traveling lecturer, Crouch-Hazlett settled down as an organizer for the Socialist Party of Montana, an organization at the time of about 450 dues-paying members active in 25 "locals." Hazlett was named editor of the Socialist Party of Montana's newspaper, Montana News, in December 1905.

One historian has called Crouch-Hazlett "a most different administrator" of the party newspaper, noting that she preferred to play the role of "roving reporter" and leaving the technical and administrative details of newspaper production to her close political associate, State Secretary James D. Graham. Her time traversing the massive state of Montana in this period involved Crouch-Hazlett closely with the Western Federation of Miners. Her association in the labor movement also had a certain participatory element, as during the course of her life, Hazlett was herself a member of the Knights of Labor and the American Labor Union, ultimately unsuccessful rivals of the American Federation of Labor.

Beginning in 1908, the Montana Socialist Party was divided by a bitter factional split, pitting Graham and party editor Crouch-Hazlett on one side and Lewis Duncan, the future Socialist mayor of Butte, on the other. Driven by Local Butte, the 1908 State Convention of the Socialist Party of Montana appointed an auditing committee headed by Duncan to closely inspect the organization's books. Duncan proclaimed the state party's books to be in "wretched condition" and led Local Butte in organizing a call for the resignation of Graham and Hazlett. While Graham was amenable, Crouch-Hazlett refused to accede to this demand, so in the spring of 1909 the Duncan-dominated State Executive Committee expelled both Graham and Hazlett from the party's ranks and formally terminated the organization's connection with the Lewistown-based Montana News.

Graham and Crouch-Hazlett were accused of the misappropriation of party funds by the Duncan faction, and the matter ended up in the courts. The Unitarian minister Duncan also made morals allegations against Crouch-Hazlett, charging that she had been "living openly in an adulterous and licentious relationship with a former member of the Lewistown local."

Back of these factional fisticuffs in addition to financial and personal disagreements there lay a policy difference. Local Butte was at this time warmly supportive of Big Bill Haywood, industrial unionism, and the syndicalist Industrial Workers of the World, going so far as to endorse Haywood as a potential candidate for President of the United States, while Crouch-Hazlett in Montana News stressed the historic refusal of the Socialist Party to directly intervene in trade union matters.

in 1910, with Montana News broken by the factional warfare and party membership down by 45 percent, Crouch-Hazlett again resumed her role as a professional organizer for the Socialist Party of America. She dedicated the bulk of her time to organizing efforts in the American South from 1914 to 1916. Crouch-Hazlett moved to Brooklyn, New York during the latter part of the decade and ran for New York State Assembly in the 1st District of Kings County, New York on the Socialist ticket in 1920.

Crouch-Hazlett ended her career as an organizer on behalf of the Socialist Party in 1921. During this final year, Crouch-Hazlett was at least once kidnapped by a band of members of the American Legion, who transported her hundreds of miles before leaving her in a deserted area. This experience did not break Crouch-Hazlett's commitment, but it did nonetheless coincide with an end to her tenure as a Socialist Party organizer.

Membership in the SPA plummeted during the early part of the 1920s, following its splitinto rival Socialist and Communist organizations at its 1919 Emergency National Convention. With dues collections drastically diminished, the party was forced to curtail the number of its paid functionaries due to ensuing budgetary difficulties, forcing Hazlett to seek other means of support.

Crouch-Hazlett visited England, arranging beforehand with British labor activist Jessie Stephen to have her letters typed whilst there.

=== Death and legacy ===
In 1925 Crouch-Hazlett enrolled at New York University in an effort to earn a Doctorate degree. She died in May 1941. Her papers reside among the Social Democratic Party Papers of the Milwaukee County Historical Society in Milwaukee, Wisconsin.

== Works ==
- "Women in the Socialist Movement," Montana News [Lewiston], June 1, 1904, pg. 1.
- "Mrs. Hazlett Brutally Treated at Spokane," The Socialist [Seattle], whole no. 344 (September 21, 1907), pg. 1.
- "The Socialist Movement and Woman Suffrage," Socialist Woman, vol. 2 (June 1908), pg. 5.
- "Finale!" (poem), The New Review, vol. 1, no. 9 (March 1, 1913), pg. 276.
