= Marguerite Wells =

American social reformer

Marguerite Milton Wells
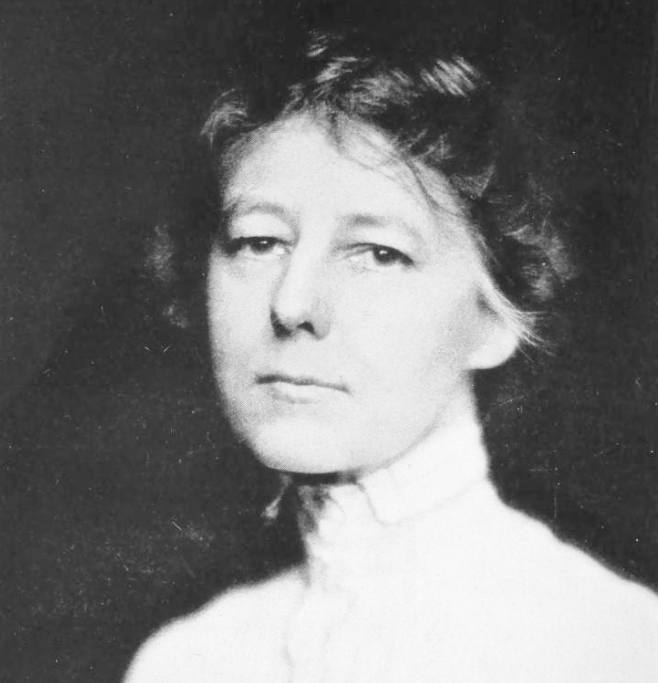
- Born: 1872; Milwaukee, Wisconsin
- Died: 1959 (aged 86–87); Minneapolis, Minnesota
- Occupations: Suffragist, social reformer

Marguerite Milton Wells (1872–1959) was an American suffragist and social reformer. She served as president of the Minnesota League of Women Voters and president of the National League of Women Voters.

Wells was born in Milwaukee, Wisconsin, in 1872. She attended Smith College from 1891 through 1895. In 1917 she became a member of the Minnesota Woman Suffrage Association (MWSA). There she organized a petition drive supporting the passage of Woman Suffrage and presented to the Minnesota congressional delegation. Following the passage of the 19th Amendment Wells turned her attention to the newly created League of Women Voters. She served as president of the Minnesota League of Women Voters (1922-1932) and president of the National League of Women Voters (1934-1944).

In 1929 her article Some Effects of Woman Suffrage was published in the journal Women in the Modern World. In 1938 the National League of Women Voters published her 22-page booklet A Portrait of the League of Women Voters at the Age of Eighteen.

Wells died in Minneapolis in 1959. Her papers are in the Schlesinger Library at Radcliffe Institute Her name is included on the Minnesota Woman Suffrage Memorial.
