= Elsie Lincoln Benedict =

American lecturer and writer on psychology

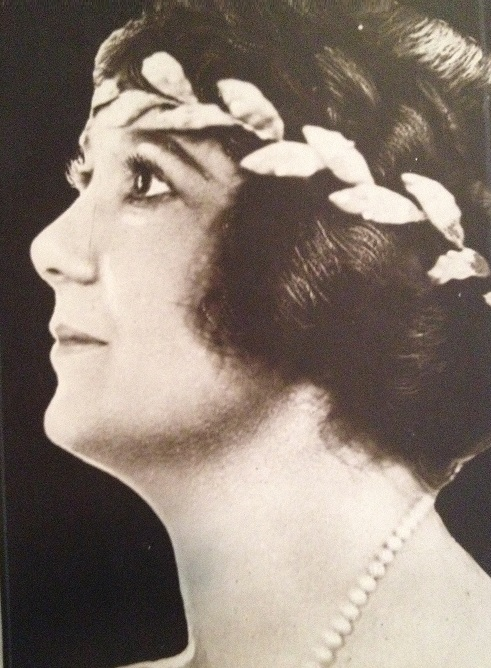
- Born: Elsie Lincoln Vandegrift; November 2, 1885; Osborne, Kansas, US
- Died: February 5, 1970 (aged 84); San Francisco, California, US
- Resting place: Forest Lawn Memorial Park, Glendale, Los Angeles County, California; 34.12511°N 118.25244°W
- Known for: National organizer, American Woman Suffrage Association (1914–1918); Author on psychology and the subconscious mind Worldwide lecturer to over 3 million Founder, International Opportunity League; Founder, Benedict School of Opportunity; Traveled to 56 countries before 1930
- Spouse: Ralph Paine Benedict (died 1941)

Signature
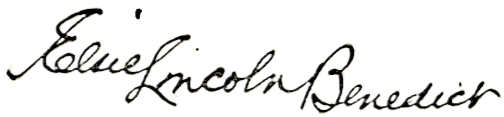

Elsie Lincoln Benedict (née Vandegrift; November 2, 1885 – February 5, 1970), also known as 'The Wonder Woman', was advertised as the world's best known lecturer during the 1920s and 1930s, speaking to over 3 million people in her lifetime and writing on what Napoleon Hill and Dale Carnegie and a long list of men would do later. Renowned for her collegiate debate skills, emerged as a key figure in the national suffrage movement being personally recruited by Carrie Chapman Catt for national suffrage advocacy as the second-highest paid American suffragist leader. She would later take to the worldwide stage promoting the law of attraction through her many free and paid lecture series. She was the founder of Brainology, a famous course on scientific mind training.

== Early life ==
Elsie Lincoln Vandegrift was born on November 2, 1885 in Osborne, Kansas to William and Adella (Allen) Vandergrift. As the eldest of six siblings, she moved with her family to Montrose, where she developed a foundation for her future as an editor of her high school newspaper and a successful participant in oratorical contests.

=== Family background ===
The Vandegrift family experienced pivotal changes during Elsie's early adulthood. In 1912, her parents underwent a legal separation, with her mother Adella being granted a divorce due to William's non-support.

Tragedy struck in 1913 when Elsie's father, William Vandegrift, succumbed to pneumonia in Salt Lake City, Utah. His entrepreneurial spirit and community engagement were well-noted in his obituary. The following thirteen years later, her mother, Adella M. Vandegrift, died in San Diego on May 6, 1926.

=== Education and early achievements ===
Amidst these family events, Elsie's high school years were marked by significant accomplishments. She won first place in the first oratorical contest between western slope high schools, held in Montrose. Her speech, "The Advantage of Difficulties," not only displayed her oratory skills but also her ability to captivate an audience, a trait that would define her subsequent career.

She attended the University of Denver from 1905 to 1907 studying psychology. After her time at Denver University, at the age of 22, Elsie participated in a dramatic recital at the Montrose Opera House alongside Myrtle Goodrich in 1907. The event was well-received, with Elsie delivering compelling performances in various monologues and dramatic readings. Her portrayal of intense scenes, such as the chariot race from "Ben Hur," earned enthusiastic applause and recognition, highlighting her dramatic talents and early popularity within her community. Then, she went on to obtain a law degree at the University of Colorado in Boulder. She joined the debate team, to which she was the only female, and held over 12 gold medals for oratory. She was the first woman to win a place in an intercollegiate debate team.

A notable early accomplishment occurred during the annual oratorical contest at the University of Colorado Boulder in 1908. Vandegrift gained unique recognition as the first woman student to participate in this contest, competing against four male contestants. Although she did not win the top prize, her participation marked a significant milestone in the university's history and in the broader context of women's evolving roles in academia and public life. The Montrose Press reported this event, highlighting her trailblazing role and the novelty of her participation as a first-year student in such a prestigious contest.

Reflecting back on her early career in 1926, Elsie Lincoln Benedict emphasized the value of authenticity and resilience. Advising to "put aside fear and dispense with false social standards...be yourself," she reflected on her university days as a step scrubber. Despite being snubbed by some, she cherished the kindness of those who were "friendly and encouraging — and complimented my clean steps." Her core message to young people was to "make up their minds what they want to do and start to do it, regardless of discouragements."

== Early career ==
In 1909, Colorado Governor John F. Shafroth appointed her the official reporter of the Colorado Senate. After serving this capacity for three years, she was appointed Chief of the Advertising Department of the State Land Office, where she became involved in a notable controversy. According to a 1912 report in the Montrose Daily Press, Elsie, known for her militant suffragette stance, clashed with Judge George Thorne, the chief clerk of the Land Board, over questions of authority. This feud, which escalated to involve the governor's office, eventually led to her transfer to the office of the state insurance commissioner. This episode showcased her assertive character and her willingness to stand her ground in professional disputes. Interestingly, her earlier support of Governor Shafroth as a delegate from Montrose at the Democratic state convention played a part in her initial appointment to the land board and possibly influenced the resolution of this dispute. In 1912, she resigned to become a political editor of the Denver Express and later of the Denver Post, the largest daily in Colorado at the time.

== Role in the women's suffrage movement ==
Elsie Lincoln Vandegrift, known for her oratory skills and work at the Denver Post, caught the attention of national suffrage leaders not for direct involvement in Colorado's suffrage movement, but for her exceptional public speaking ability. Her eloquence, honed during her college years, paved the way for her recruitment into the national suffrage movement.

=== National recognition and recruitment by Carrie Chapman Catt ===
In 1914, Carrie Chapman Catt, a prominent figure in the women's suffrage movement and president of the International Suffrage Association, sought a capable and articulate advocate from Colorado to represent and speak for the movement in New York. Elsie, with her proven oratory skills and youthful enthusiasm measured up to Catt's requirements was recommended for this role by Mary C. C. Bradford. Catt's recruitment criteria specifically sought a "young Colorado woman college graduate, must not be too old or too young, a voter, good orator and organizer, able to speak from public platform, private drawing room or soap box," a description that Vandergrift fulfilled with distinction. Catt's decision to recruit Elsie marked a significant turn in her career, transitioning from a local journalist to national suffrage spokesperson.

In New York, Elsie played a crucial role in the National Suffrage, Elsie's impact was immediate and profound. She received notable attention in the New York media, including a significant write-up in the New York Evening Mail. Her ability to articulate the suffrage cause effectively and win over audiences was highlighted in an incident at a debate in Brooklyn, where she successfully countered the arguments of an anti-suffragist debater. This exposure in New York was a testament to her skills and the influence she wielded in advancing the suffrage movement. She became known for her resilience and determination, as exemplified by an incident during an open-air suffrage meeting in Columbus Circle. A disruptive act, where water was poured on her, did not deter her; instead, she famously exclaimed, "You can't dampen my enthusiasm in that way." When checking into a hotel room, the lights suddenly went out an unknown assailant threw a blanket over her head and fled while she bravely screamed in defiance."

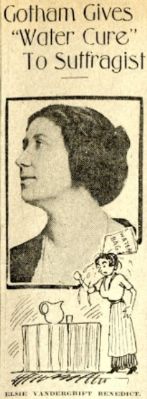
Elsie exclaimed, "You can't dampen my enthusiasm in that way."

During World War I, Elsie reiterated the suffragists' commitment to national service while continuing to advocate for women's voting rights. As reported by The Rocky Mountain News in 1917, Elsie emphasized the suffragists' dual role as both contributors to the war effort and relentless campaigners for suffrage. She highlighted their determination to be "good soldiers" for their country, while simultaneously demanding the vote for women in non-suffrage states. This strategic approach, which involved proving their worth as national contributors, was central to the suffrage movement's tactics during the war. Elsie also noted the significant financial support from Miriam Leslie's $500,000 bequest to the suffrage cause, underlining the movement's preparedness for the upcoming campaigns.

The impact of Elsie's efforts was not confined to New York. Her reputation as an effective suffrage advocate spread rapidly, leading to her involvement in significant campaigns across the country. The Rocky Mountain News highlighted her influence in an article titled "DENVER GIRL SPEAKER TAKES EAST BY STORM," describing her six-month series of triumphs in the East and her subsequent selection to lead the Nebraska Woman Suffrage Fight. Carrie Chapman Catt praised Elsie as "the most capable organizer and the most eloquent speaker we have—the most effective worker in every phase of our work." Elsie's rapid ascent in the movement was a testament to her oratorical prowess, organizational skills, and her ability to captivate and persuade diverse audiences, whether in a drawing room or on a street corner.

=== Influence on legislative matters ===
Elsie's impact extended beyond public advocacy to influencing legislative acknowledgment of the suffrage movement's success. In 1915, the Colorado Senate adopted a resolution recognizing the success of woman suffrage in the state after twenty years. This resolution, a testament to the suffrage movement's effectiveness in Colorado, was adopted at Elsie's request, reflecting her significant influence even after moving to New York to aid in the suffrage work there. This recognition by the Colorado legislature underscored the tangible results of the suffrage movement's efforts and Elsie's role in these achievements.

=== Personal sacrifices and dedication ===
Elsie Lincoln Vandegrift's engagement to Ralph Paine Benedict was itself a testament to the modern age and her forward-thinking nature. In an era when long-distance communication was still a novelty, Elsie accepted Ralph's marriage proposal over a long-distance telephone call. This unique engagement, conducted across the miles, underscored the non-traditional and progressive spirit that Elsie embodied. The couple's engagement via telephone also highlighted their dedication to their respective careers and to the suffrage movement, willing to embrace a long-distance relationship amidst their busy professional lives. In a display of her unwavering dedication, Elsie postponed her wedding until after the Nebraska election, prioritizing the suffrage cause. She expressed her intent to remain in Omaha to await the outcome of the women's suffrage amendment before returning to Denver for her marriage. She married her husband, Ralph Paine Benedict, on November 1, 1914, by Judge Ben B. Lindsey of Colorado.

Even after her marriage, Elsie planned to continue her campaign work, with the full support of her husband, who shared her enthusiasm for the cause. Their relationship and brief honeymoon period exemplified the personal choices many women advocates faced during the suffrage movement.

=== Contributions to the national suffrage movement ===
Following her marriage, Elsie continued to be a driving force in the National Suffrage Movement. She brought with her the experiences and perspectives of Colorado, a state progressive in women's suffrage, and used these insights to advance the movement on a national scale.

In addition to her public speaking and organizing roles, Elsie celebrated significant victories within the suffrage movement. One such moment of joy came with the signing of the suffrage bill by Governor Lynn Frazier of North Dakota in January 1917, granting women the right to vote after July 1. The Rocky Mountain News reported Elsie's happiness over this victory, underscoring her involvement in the campaign in North Dakota. She attributed the success to the state's progressiveness, the support of Governor Lynn Frazier, and the desire to maintain the state's 'dry' status against the liquor interests that had campaigned against the suffrage act. This victory was a testament to Elsie's dedication and the effectiveness of the strategies employed by the suffrage movement under her influence.

Elsie's commitment to the cause saw her delay personal milestones in favor of advocacy work. Her return was marked by a swift engagement with the suffrage campaign, highlighting the urgency and importance she placed on the movement. Despite the long distances involved, her partnership with Ralph Paine Benedict remained strong, with him supporting her work and contributing to the cause in his own capacity. Elsie's reputation as a persuasive speaker was further solidified at a public event organized by a women's club, where she eloquently spoke against militant suffragism, advocating instead for a more inclusive approach to women's rights. Her call for the establishment of the Open Forum in Boulder, as reported in the Boulder Daily Camera, exemplifies her commitment to fostering community dialogue and civic engagement, aligning with the broader goals of the National Suffrage Association under Carrie Chapman Catt's leadership.

== Transition to a renowned lecturer ==
As the women's suffrage movement neared its landmark achievement with the Nineteenth Amendment to the United States Constitution, Elsie's prominence as a public figure and advocate for women's rights had grown immensely. With the suffrage movement nearing success, Elsie transitioned to broader topics, leveraging her reputation as a powerful orator.

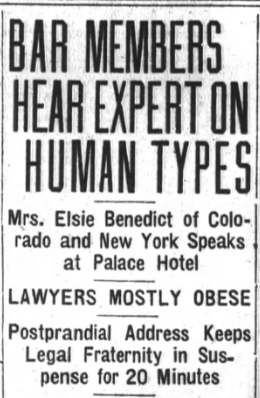
1919 San Francisco Chronicle article on Elsie Benedict's speech to lawyers, highlighting her wit and insight into human types.

In 1918, Elsie embarked on a new journey, accepting an invitation from a lyceum bureau to tour the Pacific coast. She planned to deliver lectures on "What the World War Will Win for Women," reflecting the global strides in women's suffrage, including in England, France, Russia, and Canada. This shift marked a pivotal transition in her career, from a suffrage activist to a speaker on wider social issues.

The Rocky Mountain News reported on her new endeavor, emphasizing her evolution from a suffragist to a public lecturer. This move highlighted Elsie's adaptability and insight into the broader implications of women's rights in a rapidly changing world.

Her adaptability and the breadth of her insight into societal changes were on full display in 1919, just as the women's suffrage movement was celebrating the passage of the Nineteenth Amendment. Capturing the attention of the legal fraternity, Elsie delivered a memorable address to the State Bar of California Association, which was wittily reported in the San Francisco Chronicle under the headline "Bar Members Hear Expert on Human Types." With characteristic humor and sharp observation, she noted the predominance of obesity among lawyers, a remark that played on the physical and intellectual 'types' prevalent in the profession at the time. This lighthearted commentary at the Palace Hotel was not just a display of Elsie's expertise in human analysis but also her ability to engage with diverse audiences, earning her accolades and echoing her status as a sought-after speaker on broader societal issues.

== Role as the world's most famous lecturer as the 'Wonder Woman' ==
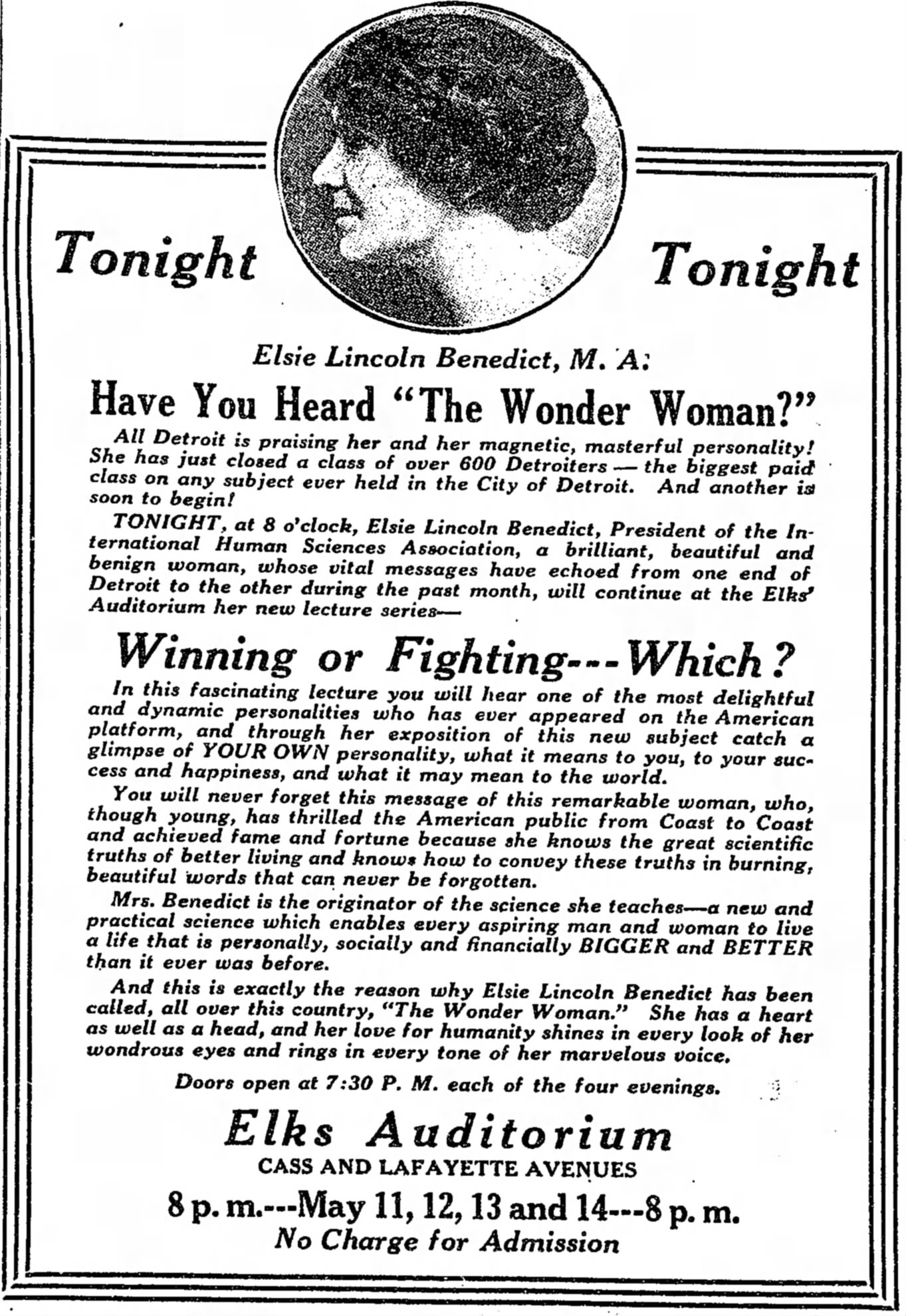
"The Wonder Woman"

Benedict's transition from a suffragist to one of the world's most famous lecturers marked a significant chapter in her career. Known as 'the greatest woman orator of America,' her lectures on the West Coast in the early 1920s established her as a formidable and influential public speaker. Her opening night in Los Angeles, for instance, attracted an overwhelming audience of 1,200, surpassing the venue's capacity of 1,000, showcasing her popularity and the public's eagerness to hear her insights. During her 1920 Human Analysis lecture series in Seattle, she drew larger audiences than those that greeted President Wilson, a testament to her extraordinary appeal and the high regard in which she was held as a speaker.

Her financial success was evident by 1922, when she became a millionaire before turning 30. She built a cobblestone cottage in the Carmel Highlands, California, which became a hub for her and her husband, Ralph, to continue their creative endeavors and host friends. Her extensive travels, encompassing 55 countries, were documented in her book "Our Trip Around the World," widely regarded as a comprehensive travel document of its era. In a 1922 lecture at Scottish Rite Auditorium, she commented, "Most people use less brains in selecting the person with whom they are to spend their lives than they do in choosing an automobile, a bicycle or a cut of steak. Love isn't enough; there must also be understanding."

Benedict served as head of the Benedict School of Opportunity, "The Traveling University for Men and Women", was founder of International Opportunity League, and president of the Elsie Lincoln Benedict Club. In her lifetime, she traveled to 55 countries and her book, "Our Trip Around the World", was considered the most extensive travel book of its time. She recorded her travels, not only in her writings, but in her postcard and scrapbook collection.

== Association with Aimee Semple McPherson ==
In May 1926, American evangelist and Foursquare Church founder, Aimee Semple McPherson, disappeared for months and the case remains unsolved. In the trial following her reappearance, five witnesses testified they saw Aimee at the Benedict cottage in the Carmel Highlands. In 1926, during the highly publicized controversy of McPherson's disappearance, Elsie publicly defended her, asserting her innocence against the allegations made. While on trial, Aimee asserted 'I was not in Carmel'. Elsie firmly stood by McPherson, whom she described as a persecuted woman and entirely innocent of any wrongdoing.

== Later life and family ==
Elsie Lincoln Benedict's aunt was Frances Matilda Van de Grift Osbourne Stevenson, better known as Fanny Stevenson, who was married to the Scottish author Robert Louis Stevenson. Fanny Stevenson, an American magazine writer, became Stevenson's spouse in 1880. This relationship connects Elsie Lincoln Benedict to a significant figure in the literary history of the late 19th and early 20th centuries.

Elsie Lincoln Benedict died at the age of 84 on February 5, 1970, at the Presbyterian Hospital of Pacific Medical Center in San Francisco, California, due to mesenteric thrombosis. She bequeathed 90% of her estate to her three grandchildren.

== Legacy ==
Elsie Lincoln Benedict's influence extends beyond her lifetime, notably highlighted by Dr. Joseph Vitale and Dr. Beth Blum. Vitale, in a 2015 blog post, referred to her as a 'forgotten wonder woman' of the 1920s, emphasizing her pioneering role in self-help and personal development. Dr. Beth Blum's 2021 article further explores Benedict's impact on modernist thought and the self-help movement, particularly through her work "How to Analyze People on Sight." Blum describes Benedict as a pioneering figure who, beyond her suffrage activism, turned her talents to self-help and personal development, positioning her as a forerunner in the field long before it gained widespread recognition.

The establishment of the Elsie Lincoln Vandegrift (Benedict) Memorial Scholarship at the University of Denver, continue to cement her legacy in psychology. On November 2, 2023, an interview with Elsie's great-granddaughter, Heather – the daughter of Elsie's granddaughter Leeanna – brought renewed attention to Elsie's significant contributions to public speaking and psychology.

=== Memorials ===
Elsie L. Benedict and Ralph P. Benedict are interred at Forest Lawn Memorial Park in Glendale.

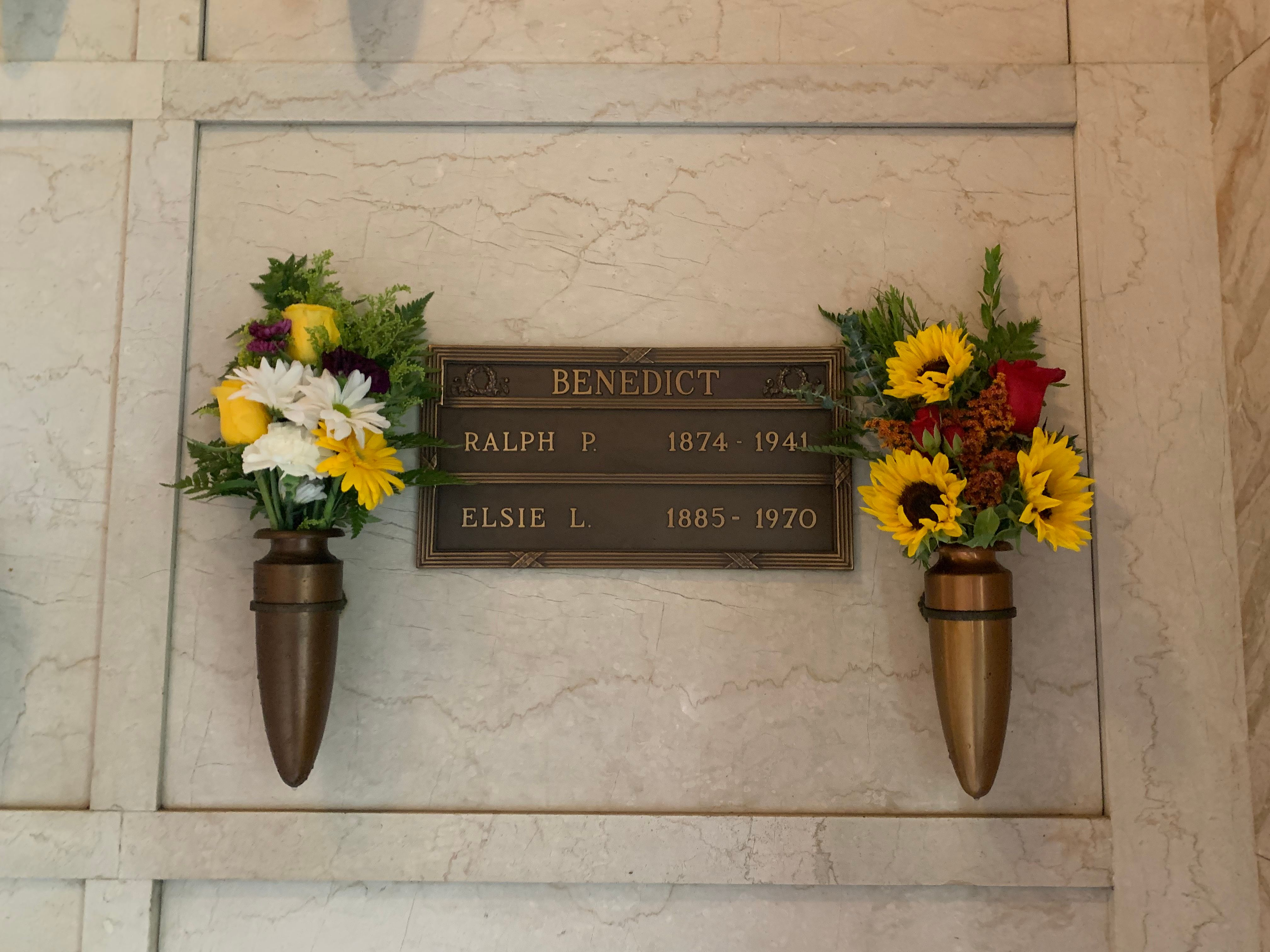
The final resting place of Elsie L. Benedict (1885–1970) and Ralph P. Benedict (1874–1941), adorned with floral tributes, located in Forest Lawn Memorial Park, Glendale.

In 2004, Elsie was inducted into the Osborne, Kansas County Hall of Fame. In 2013, Elsie's original travel scrapbooks, pictures, journal, lecture award trophies, and an unpublished manuscript on Australia were rediscovered and returned to her great-granddaughters. This event exemplified her belief that "There are no accidents. Everything that happens in our individual world, just as every occurrence in the material universe, is brought about by the operation of law." In 2018, her great-granddaughters placed one of her original trophies in Elsie's former cottage in Carmel-by-the-sea, with an agreement with the current owners that it remains as a part of the cottage.

== Works ==
Benedict authored the following books:

- Human Analysis (1919)
- Practical Psychology (1920)
- Famous Lovers (1927)
- The Spell of the South Seas (1930)
- Inspirational Poems (1931)
- Stimulating Stories (1931)
- Benedictines (1931)
- So This Is Australia (1932)
- Spain Before It Happened (1937)

=== With Ralph Benedict ===
- How to Analyze People on Sight – The Five Human Types (1921)
- The Development of Personality (1922)
- Unlocking the Subconscious (1922)
- How To Get Anything You Want (1923)
- Scientific Mind Training (1925)
- How to Make More Money (1925)
- Child Training (1926)
- Our Trip Around the World (1926)
- Public Speaking (1927)
- Brainology: Understanding, Developing and Training Your Brain (1928)
