= South Dakota Messenger =

American feminist newspaper (1912–1914)

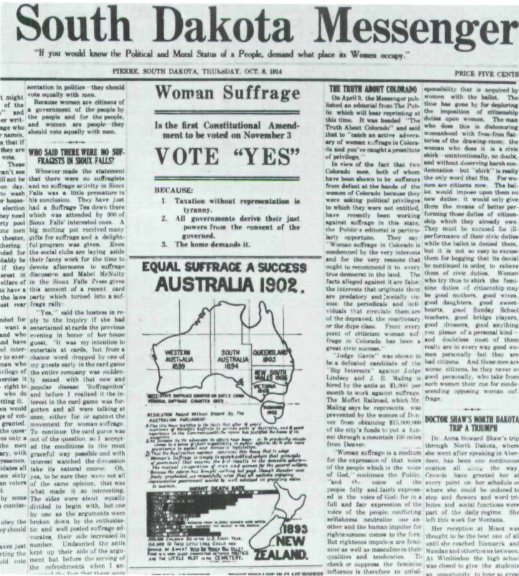
South Dakota Messenger October 8, 1914

The South Dakota Messenger was a weekly feminist newspaper in South Dakota, United States, from January 1912 to October 1914. It was published in Pierre, South Dakota, by Wm. J. Mundt. Marguerite Karcher-Sahr, the daughter of Pierre pioneer Henry Karcher, wrote for the newspaper. Ruth B. Hipple was one of the editors.

== See also ==
- Women's suffrage in South Dakota

== Bibliography ==
- Leslie Ann Medema, The Role of the South Dakota Messenger in the Woman Suffrage Campaign of 1913–1914 (University of South Dakota Press, 2000)
