= Effie McCollum Jones =

American Universalist minister and suffragist (1869–1952)

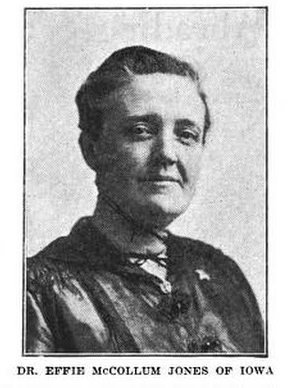
- Jones, from a 1919 publication.

Personal life
- Born: March 29, 1869 Redfield, Kansas
- Died: July 6, 1952 (aged 83) Webster City, Iowa

Religious life
- Religion: Universalist

Effie McCollum Jones (1869-1952) was an American Universalist minister and suffragist.

== Biography ==
Born in rural Kansas, she attended Lombard College in Galesburg, Illinois, and received an honorary doctorate from Lombard College's Ryder School of Divinity. She was the minister in Waterloo, Iowa, and lectured widely for women's suffrage and about physical and mental health. She died July 6, 1952, in Webster City, Iowa.

Effie McCollum was born on a small farm in Kansas. She taught school for four years before attending Lombard College. She graduated in 1892 and married one of her classmates Ben Wallace Jones. They were ordained together to the ministry of the Universalist Church in Waterloo, Iowa. Two years later, she and her husband became co-pastors of First Universalist Church in Barre, Vermont. Mr. Jones died in 1898 and Effie continued on as the sole pastor for six more years. In 1900, she officiated at the funeral of celebrated Vermont author Rowland Robinson. In 1904, she was called again to the church in Waterloo where she was the sole pastor until 1916. She worked as a supply pastor in Webster City from 1917 to 1919 and returned there in 1925 after six years of travel and lecturing. She was the minister in Webster City until 1946 and lived there until her death in 1952.

She earned an honorary Doctor of Divinity from Lombard College's Ryder School of Divinity in 1907 and in 1910 she was invited to address the International Congress of Religious Liberals in Berlin, Germany.

== See also ==
- Elmer McCollum
