= Ruth B. Hipple =

Ruth B. Hipple (1873-1962) was an American suffragist.

== Early life ==
Ruth Hipple was born Ruth Bowman in May 1873. In 1878 Hipple's family moved from Black River Falls, Wisconsin to the Dakota Territory. The family settled near Ashton two years later.

== Career ==
Hipple learned shorthand and worked as a stenographer at the South Dakota state capital. She married state auditor John Elmer Hipple in 1896.

Hipple was an active proponent of women's suffrage. In support of the suffrage movement, Hipple worked as an auditor and press secretary. She was a member of the South Dakota Universal Franchise League's Legislative Committee in 1912. Starting in 1913, Hipple was an editor for the South Dakota Messenger, a publication for suffragists. Hipple and her husband frequently opened their home to suffragists traveling to Pierre.

For six months after the United States entered World War I, Hipple worked for the Red Cross and served on the executive committee for Pierre's Red Cross. Hipple's residence in Pierre and her political connections allowed her to provide information to suffragists in South Dakota. Hipple received advance notice from Governor Peter Norbeck that he was considering adding a special session for the legislature. Hipple passed that information along to South Dakota Franchise League's president Mamie Shields Pyle.

Hipple started the local chapter of the Girl Scouts in Pierre.

== Death and legacy ==
Hipple died on May 25, 1962. Hipple's home has become a landmark operated by the National Park Service.
