= Marietta Bones =

American woman suffragist and philanthropist (1842–1901)

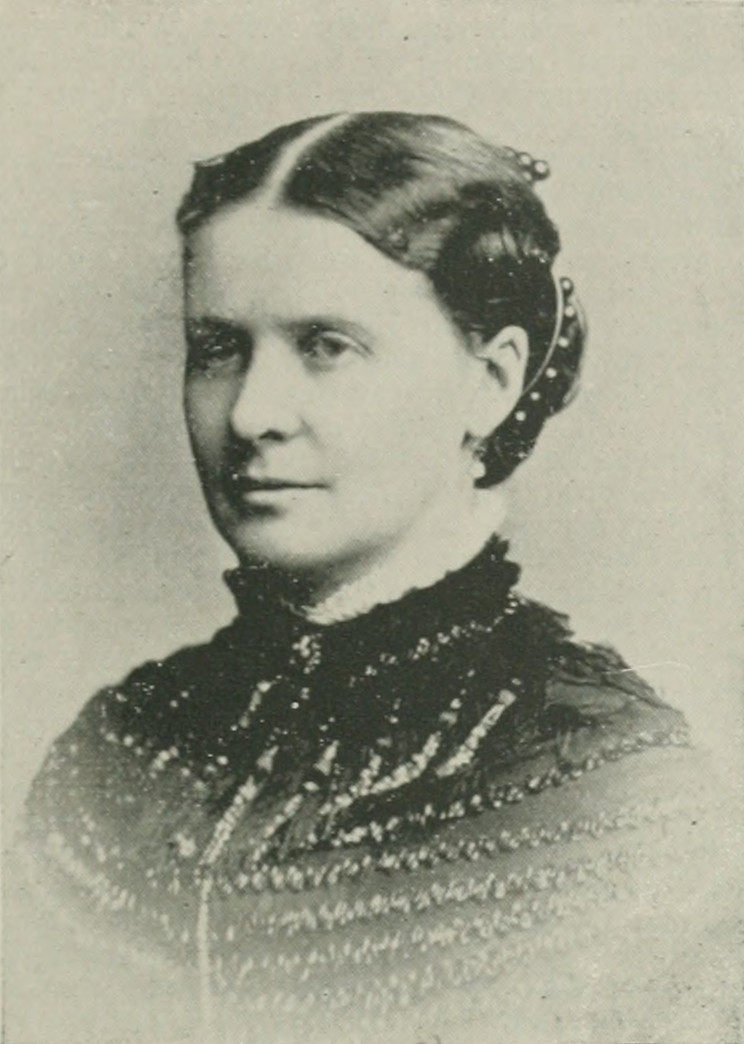
- Born: Marietta Matilda Wilkins; May 4, 1842; Clarion County, Pennsylvania
- Died: July 11, 1901 (aged 59); Washington D.C.
- Occupations: Suffragist, social reformer and philanthropist
- Years active: 1881-1901

Marietta Matilda Bones (née Wilkins; May 4, 1842 – July 11, 1901) was an American woman suffragist, social reformer, and philanthropist. In 1881, she was elected vice president of the National Woman Suffrage Association, and was re-elected annually for nine years. In 1890, suffragist Susan B. Anthony and supporters of the movement merged the National Women Suffrage Association into the National American Women Suffrage Association (NAWSA). In 1882, Bones made her first appearance as a public speaker in Webster, soon to be Webster, South Dakota, where she later resided. She was an active temperance worker, and was secretary of the first Non-Partisan National Woman's Christian Temperance Union in 1889. She took great interest in all reform and charitable institutions.

== Early years and education ==
Marietta Matilda Wilkins was born on a farm in Clarion County, Pennsylvania, May 4, 1842. Her father, James A. Wilkins, was born in Clarion County, where he resided for forty-eight years, before relocating to Iowa. He died six months later. Mr. Wilkins was a noted Abolitionist, known to have maintained an Underground Railroad station. Wilkins' mother, Jane Trumbull, was originally from Connecticut, and a descendant of Jonathan Trumbull.

Wilkins received her education from the Huidekoper Seminary, Meadville, Pennsylvania, and the Washington Female Seminary in Washington, Pennsylvania.

== Career ==
Marietta Matilda Wilkins took the name Marietta Bones after marriage. From 1881 to 1890, Bones was the vice president of the National Women Suffrage Association. In representing the Dakota Territory, she worked with suffragists such as Susan B. Anthony and Linda Slaughter, who helped her expand membership in the vast territory. In September 1883, she addressed Dakota's State Constitutional Convention on behalf of woman's enfranchisement. Failing to have her claim for woman's equality before the law recognized in the State Constitution there framed, she earnestly petitioned both houses of Congress to deny Dakota's admission to the Union as a state. Bones actively opposed efforts to make the social question of temperance a political question by sharing her controversial views in newspaper articles.

She was an active temperance worker, and in 1889 was secretary of the first Non-Partisan National Woman's Christian Temperance Union convention in Chicago, Illinois. The local Woman's Christian Temperance Union (WCTU) in Webster, South Dakota discharged her after a year of service for her participation in the non-partisan convention. Bones received an official notice stating, "The ladies of Webster union moved and carried that Bones' dues be returned on account of her having joined the secession movement, and also on account of her antagonism to our State president."

As a pioneer settler in her town, Bones secured a donation of a block of lots for a courthouse and county buildings. Through her influence, Day County, South Dakota was divided to provide a central location for the county seat. Her actions to have the capital located at the state's geographical center, attracted the attention of the board of trade in the city of Pierre. She was invited to be an honored guest of their city.

Bones was an able assistant of Matilda Joslyn Gage in organizing the Woman's National Liberal Union. She addressed the convention in Washington, D.C., and was one of the executive council of that organization.

== Personal life ==
In Iowa, she married Kendall Parker, and that marriage ended in divorce. She retained custody of their children, but did not receive any money in support. She married Colonel Thomas Arthur Bones (1835–1923) in 1880 or 1881. He was the president of the board of commissioners that built the Soldiers' Home at Hot Springs, South Dakota.

Bones died on July 11, 1901, in Washington, D.C. and was buried at Glenwood Cemetery in that city.
