= National Register of Historic Places listings in Downtown and Midtown Detroit =

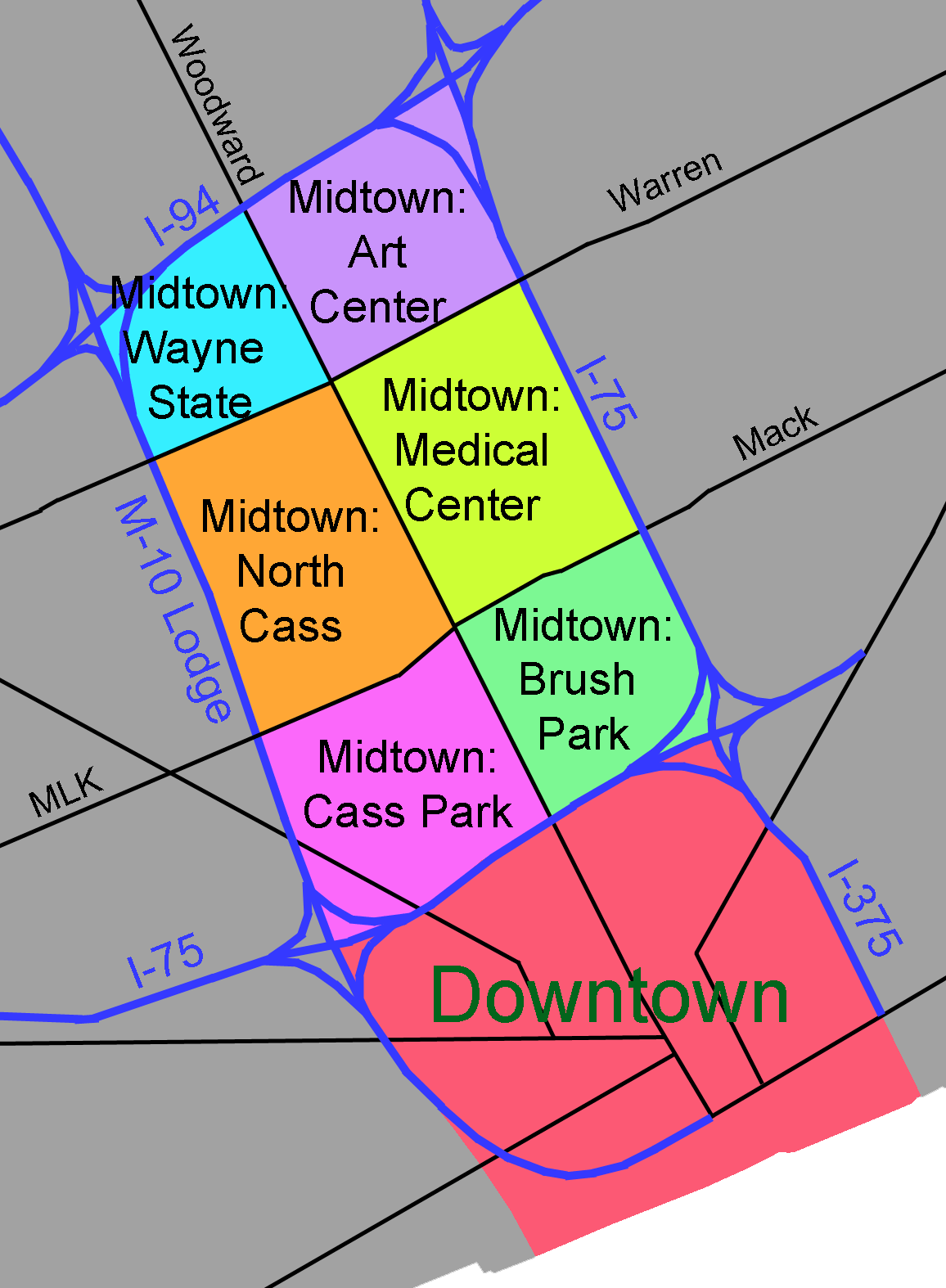
Midtown and Downtown

This is a list of the National Register of Historic Places listings in Downtown and Midtown Detroit, Michigan. It is intended to be a complete list of the properties and districts on the National Register of Historic Places in Downtown and Midtown neighborhoods in Detroit, Michigan, United States. Latitude and longitude coordinates are provided for many National Register properties and districts; these locations may be seen together in online maps.

This National Park Service list is complete through NPS recent listings posted November 6, 2026.

== Geographical areas ==
Downtown Detroit is bounded by the Lodge Freeway (M-10) on the west, the Fisher Freeway (I-75) on the north, Interstate 375 (The Chrysler Spur) on the east, and the Detroit River on the south.

Midtown Detroit is bounded by the Chrysler Freeway (I-75) on the east, the Lodge Freeway on the west, the Edsel Ford Freeway (I-94) on the north, and the Fisher Freeway on the south. Midtown is further divided by Woodward Avenue, which runs north and south through the heart of Midtown, and the east-west streets Warren and Mack/Martin Luther King.

- Wayne State neighborhood: West of Woodward and north of Warren
- North Cass neighborhood: West of Woodward, south of Warren, and north of Martin Luther King
- Cass Park neighborhood: West of Woodward and south of Martin Luther King
- Art Center neighborhood: East of Woodward and north of Warren
- Medical Center neighborhood: East of Woodward, south of Warren, and north of Mack
- Brush Park neighborhood: East of Woodward and south of Mack

There are 126 properties and districts listed on the National Register in Downtown and Midtown Detroit, including five National Historic Landmarks. There are 150 more properties and districts listed on the National Register in the remainder of the city, including five National Historic Landmarks and one property straddling the border with River Rouge, Michigan. These other properties are listed at National Register of Historic Places listings in Detroit.

All together there are 282 properties and districts listed on the National Register in Detroit proper. Nine additional properties and districts, including one National Historic Landmark, are located in the Detroit enclave of Highland Park. Three properties are located in the Detroit enclave of Hamtramck. The properties and districts in these two Detroit enclaves, plus 74 others, are listed in this list of non-Detroit NRHP listings in Wayne County.

	District	# of sites
1	Downtown and Midtown Detroit	127
2	Remainder of Detroit	156
3	Outer Wayne County, Hamtramck, & Highland Park	92
(Duplicates):		(1)
Total:		374

== History of Detroit ==
=== Beginnings ===
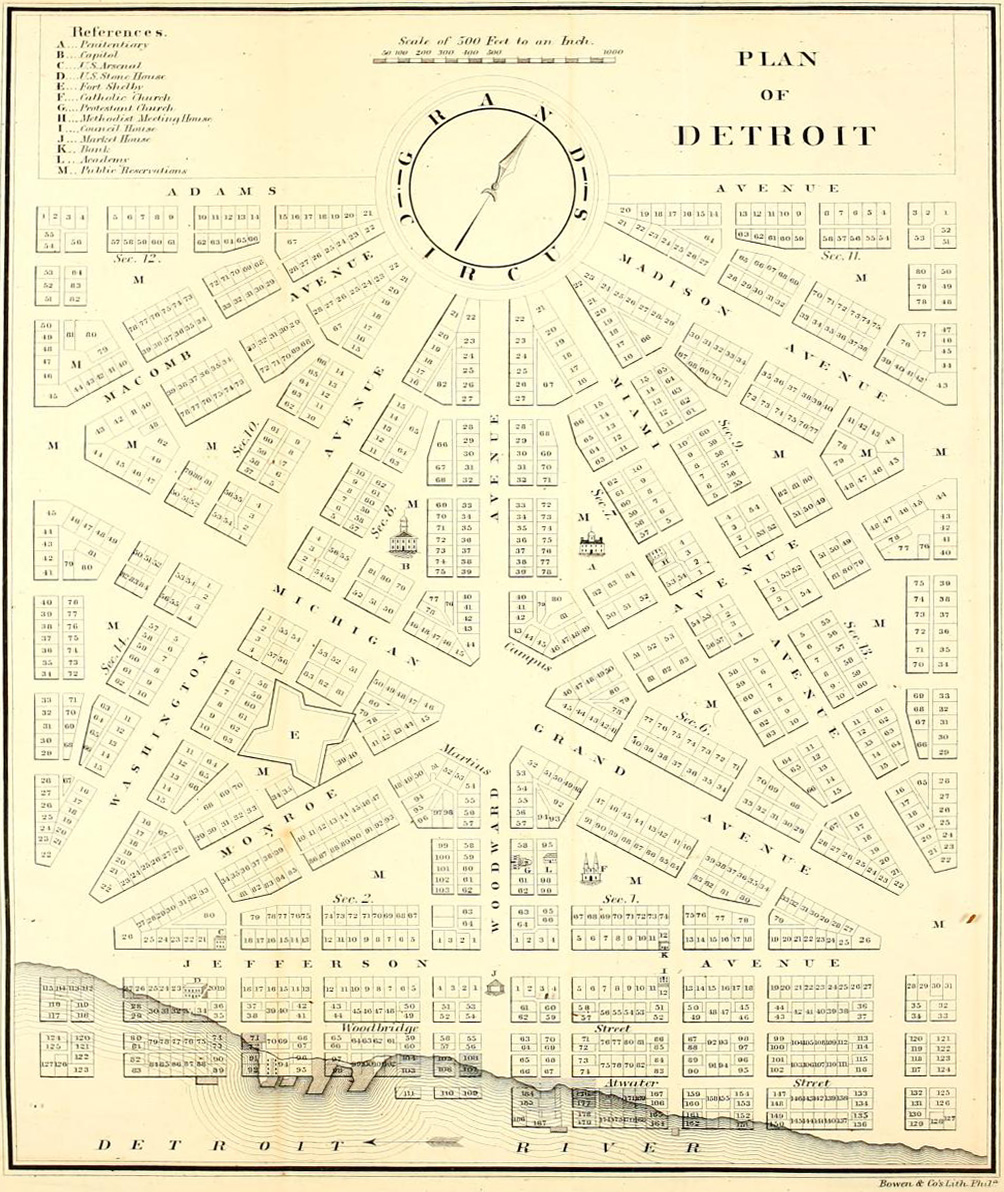
Augustus Woodward's plan for the city following 1805 fire.

Detroit, settled in 1701, is one of the oldest cities in the Midwest. It experienced a disastrous fire in 1805 which nearly destroyed the city, leaving little present-day evidence of old Detroit save a few east-side streets named for early French settlers, their ancestors, and some pear trees which were believed to have been planted by early missionaries. After the fire, Judge Augustus B. Woodward designed a plan of evenly spaced public parks with interconnecting semi-circular and diagonal streets. Although Woodward's plan was not fully implemented, the basic outline in still in place today in the heart of the city. Main thoroughfares radiate outward from the center of the city like spokes in a wheel, with Jefferson Avenue running parallel to the river, Woodward Avenue running perpendicular to it, and Gratiot, Michigan, and Grand River Avenues interspersed. A sixth main street, Fort, wanders downriver from the center of the city.

After Detroit rebuilt in the early 19th century, a thriving community soon sprang up, and by the Civil War, over 45,000 people were living in the city, primarily spread along Jefferson Avenue to the east and Fort Street to the west. As in many major American cities, subsequent redevelopment of the central city through the next 150 years has eliminated all but a handful of the antebellum structures in Detroit. The oldest remaining structures are those built as private residences, including a group in the Corktown neighborhood and another set of houses strung along Jefferson Avenue—notably the Charles Trowbridge House (1826, the oldest known structure in the city), the Joseph Campau House (1835), the Sibley House (1848), the Beaubien House (1851), and the Moross House (1855). Other extant pre-1860 structures include Fort Wayne (1849); Saints Peter and Paul Church (1848) and Mariners' Church (1849); and scattered commercial buildings (one in Randolph Street Commercial Buildings Historic District, for example). Unfortunately, the demolition of historic structures continues into the present day: multiple structures listed on the Register have been demolished in the last decade.

=== Rise of industry and commerce ===
As Detroit grew into a thriving hub of commerce and industry, the city spread along Jefferson, with multiple manufacturing firms taking advantage of the transportation resources afforded by the river and a parallel rail line. The shipyard that eventually became the Dry Dock Complex opened on the Detroit River at the foot of Orleans in 1852; Parke-Davis established a complex between East Jefferson Avenue and the river in the 1870s; another pharmaceutical firm, Frederick Stearns & Company, built a manufacturing plant in the same area in the 1890s. Globe Tobacco built a manufacturing facility closer to downtown in 1888.

The rise of manufacturing led to a new class of wealthy industrialists, entrepreneurs, and professionals. Some of these nouveau riche built along East Jefferson, resulting in structures such as the Thomas A. Parker House (1868), the Croul-Palms House (1881), the William H. Wells House (1889), the John N. Bagley House (1889), and the Frederick K. Stearns House (1902). However, Detroit began increasingly to turn away from the river, and other citizens pushed north of downtown, building houses along Woodward in what was at the time a quiet residential area. Many of these neighborhoods have disappeared under 20th-century commercialization of the Woodward corridor, but some Victorian structures remain, notably the Elisha Taylor House (1870) and the Hudson-Evans House (1872), both near the Woodward East Historic District; and the Col. Frank J. Hecker House (1888) and the Charles Lang Freer House (1887) in the East Ferry Avenue Historic District. Near the end of the century, apartment living became more acceptable for affluent middle-class families, and upscale apartments, such as the Coronado Apartments (1894), the Verona Apartments (1894), the Palms Apartments (1903), the Davenport Apartments (1905) in the Cass-Davenport Historic District, and the Garden Court Apartments (1915) were constructed to meet the new demand.

These well-to-do late-19th-century residents also funded the construction of a spate of churches, such as the Cass Avenue Methodist Episcopal Church (1883), the First Presbyterian Church (1889), the Trinity Episcopal Church (1890) (built by James E. Scripps), and the First Unitarian Church (1890).

=== Immigration ===
Detroit has long been a city of immigrants, from the early French and English settlers in the 18th century, through the Irish who settled in the Corktown neighborhood in the 1840s, to the Greeks, who settled in the Greektown neighborhood in the early 20th century and the southern whites and African Americans who came to Detroit in the years before the Great Depression. Detroit's industrial boom in the later 19th century created yet another stream of immigrants into Detroit. Perhaps the most significant contingents during this period were the German and Polish immigrants who settled in Detroit in the 1860–1890s. Germans came first, establishing German-speaking churches, primarily on the east side of the city, including St. John's-St. Luke's Evangelical Church (1872), St. Joseph Catholic Church (1873), and Sacred Heart Roman Catholic Church (1875), as well as social clubs such as the Harmonie Club (1894) and west-side churches such as St. Boniface (1882) and Gethsemane Evangelical Lutheran Church (1891). Close behind, a wave of Polish immigrants established east-side Roman Catholic parishes such as St. Albertus (1885), Sweetest Heart of Mary (1893), St. Josaphat's (1901), St. Stanislaus (1911), and St. Thomas the Apostle Church (1923). The Poles also settled on the west side, founding West Side Dom Polski (1916).

=== Birth of the automobile ===
At the turn of the 20th century, entrepreneurs in the Detroit area—notably Henry Ford—forged into production of the automobile, capitalizing on the already-existing machine tool and coach-building industry in the city. Early automotive production is recognizable by structures such as the Ford Piquette Avenue Plant (1904) (a National Historic Landmark), and multiple structures in the surrounding Piquette Avenue Industrial Historic District (including the now-destroyed E-M-F/Studebaker Plant, 1906) and the New Amsterdam Historic District (including the original Cadillac factory, 1905) and small factories such as the Crescent Brass and Pin Company Building (1905).

Automobile assembly and associated manufacturing soon dominated Detroit, and the newly minted automotive magnates built commercial and office buildings such as General Motors Building (1919), the General Motors Research Laboratory (1928), and the Fisher Building (1928).

=== Changes wrought by the automobile ===
The development of the automobile industry led to rising demands for labor, which were filled by huge numbers of newcomers from Europe and the American South. Between 1900 and 1930, the city's population soared from 265,000 to over 1.5 million, pushing the boundaries of the city outward. The population boom led to the construction of apartment buildings across the city, aimed at the middle-class auto worker. These include the Somerset Apartments (1922), the Garden Court Apartments (1915), and the Manchester Apartments (1915).

At the same time, new upscale neighborhoods farther from the center of the city sprang up, including Boston-Edison, Indian Village, and Palmer Woods. The wealthy moved into these more exclusive neighborhoods as the once-exclusive Woodward Avenue neighborhoods (such as the Warren-Prentis Historic District and the Willis-Selden Historic District) became mixed with apartments and commercial buildings. As the population spread outwards, new churches were constructed to serve the newly populated areas, notably the Roman Catholic Cathedral of the Most Blessed Sacrament (1913), the Woodward Avenue Presbyterian Church (1908), the Metropolitan United Methodist Church (1922), and the St. Theresa of Avila Roman Catholic Church (1919).

The rise of the automobile also required rethinking transportation within the city. The Chestnut Street-Grand Trunk Railroad bridge (1929) was a result of a grade separation that unsnarled train and automobile traffic. The Fort Street–Pleasant Street and Norfolk & Western Railroad Viaduct (1928) was a product of the same program, routing trucking trafficover the train traffic. And the West Jefferson Avenue–Rouge River Bridge (1922) allowed the Rouge River to be expanded for barge traffic.

Automobile wealth led to a boom in downtown Detroit business, and the construction of a collection of early-20th-century skyscrapers. The most notable of these is the Art Deco National Historic Landmark Guardian Building (1928), but numerous other significant office buildings such as the Vinton Building (1916), the Barlum Tower (1927), and the Lawyers Building (1922) were also constructed. The building boom was not confined to businesses. Shopping districts sprang up along Park Avenue, Broadway, and Woodward. Multiple hotels were constructed, including the Fort Shelby Hotel (1916), the Detroit-Leland Hotel (1927), the Royal Palm (1924), and many others. Extravagant movie theaters such as the Fox (1928) and the Palms (1925) were constructed. And public buildings, such as Orchestra Hall (1919), the Detroit Public Library (1921), and the Detroit Institute of Arts (1923).

=== African-Americans ===
During the early years of Detroit, the African-American population was relatively small. However, the Second Baptist Church (1857; rebuilt 1914) was founded with an African-American congregation in the 1830s; the church played an instrumental role in the Underground Railroad, due to Detroit's proximity to Canada. The auto boom of the 20th century changed the population, and in the years following World War I, the black population of Detroit soared. In 1910, fewer than 6000 blacks called the city home; in 1917 more than 30,000 blacks lived in Detroit. Significant African-American structures in Detroit are related to the struggle with segregation: Dunbar Hospital (founded 1914), the Ossian H. Sweet House (1925), and the Sugar Hill neighborhood. However, other structures, such as the Breitmeyer-Tobin Building (1905) are tributes to the slow integration in the latter half of the 20th century.

=== Architecture ===
A number of notable architects worked in Detroit, including D. H. Burnham & Company; Donaldson and Meier; McKim, Mead and White; Smith, Hinchman and Grylls (and Wirt C. Rowland); and Minoru Yamasaki. However, Albert Kahn deserves special recognition for the scope and variety of his work in the city, and the number of Kahn-buildings listed in the National Register. Kahn designed large industrial buildings such as the Highland Park Ford Plant (1908) in nearby Highland Park (a National Historic Landmark), Fisher Body Plant 21 (1921) in the Piquette Avenue Industrial Historic District, and his addition to the Frederick Stearns Building (1906).

Kahn's output extended to a range of building types, notably office buildings such as the General Motors Building (1919) and the Fisher Building (1928)—both National Historic Landmarks—as well as the Edwin S. George Building (1908), the Vinton Building (1916), the S. S. Kresge World Headquarters (1928), the Griswold Building (1929), and a string of banks and highrises in the Detroit Financial District. Kahn also designed private homes (the Bernard Ginsburg House, 1898; the Albert Kahn House, 1906; and homes in Boston-Edison, Rosedale Park, and Indian Village), apartment and hotel buildings (the Palms Apartments, 1903; the Addison Hotel in the Midtown Woodward Historic District, 1905, Garden Court Apartments, 1915; and 1001 Covington in the Palmer Park Apartment Building Historic District, 1925), churches (the 1903 Temple Beth-El; the 1923 Temple Beth-El; and additions on the First Congregational Church, 1921), and theatres (the National Theatre, 1911).

== Current listings ==
	Name on the Register	Image	Date listed	Location	Neighborhood	Description
1	Alpha House	Alpha House	August 26, 2021 (#100006860)	293 Eliot St. 42°20′53″N 83°03′13″W	Midtown: Brush Park	The Alpha House is the headquarters of the Gamma Lambda chapter of Alpha Phi Alpha fraternity, the first intercollegiate Greek-letter fraternity established for African American men.
2	Architects Building	Architects Building	May 4, 1995 (#95000531)	415 Brainard St. 42°20′48″N 83°03′43″W	Midtown: Cass Park	The Architects Building is a seven-story building built in 1924 and designed by Richard H. Marr, a well-known Detroit architect. Its original purpose was to provide space for all architectural professionals and trades in one building. However, the Great Depression was hard on the building, and by 1940 the architects had moved out. The building currently serves as apartments for low-income residents.
3	Bagley Memorial Fountain	Bagley Memorial Fountain	November 5, 1971 (#71000422)	Woodward and Monroe Aves. 42°19′53″N 83°02′42″W	Downtown	The Bagley Memorial Fountain was designed in 1885 by Henry Hobson Richardson, using $5000 provision in John J. Bagley's for the construction of a drinking fountain for the people of Detroit, having "water cold and pure as the coldest mountain stream". The fountain was moved to Cadillac Square Park in 2007.
4	Barlum Tower	Barlum Tower	July 27, 2005 (#05000737)	65 Cadillac Sq. 42°19′54″N 83°02′42″W	Downtown	Built in 1927 by John J. Barlum, the Barlum Tower was the first building outside of Chicago or New York to have 40 floors. The tower was part of an effort by Barlum (along with the nearby Lawyers Building, also on the Register) to rebuild Cadillac Square. The building is currently the Cadillac Tower.
5	Belcrest Hotel	Belcrest Hotel	May 31, 1984 (#84001851)	5440 Cass Ave. 42°21′36″N 83°04′07″W	Midtown: Wayne State	The Belcrest Apartment Hotel was built in 1926 as a residential hotel, catering to wealthy tenants. The building exemplified what was, at the time, a novel style of living arrangement: an apartment building that offered amenities normally associated with an hotel, such as daily maid service and a restaurant on the premises.
6	William C. Boydell House	William C. Boydell House	March 19, 1982 (#82002892)	4614 Cass Ave. 42°21′13″N 83°03′53″W	Midtown: North Cass	The William C. Boydell House is a double house, built in 1895 to resemble a large single-family residence.
7	Breitmeyer–Tobin Building	Breitmeyer–Tobin Building	March 10, 1980 (#80001918)	1308 Broadway St. 42°20′06″N 83°02′45″W	Downtown	The Breitmeyer–Tobin Building, now known as the Harmonie Centre, is an eight-story commercial building built in 1905 for John Breitmeyer Sons, Florists, who were at the time the leading florists in Detroit. In 1944, Benjamin Tobin acquired the building and marketed the office space to black professionals. Notable African-American firms had offices in the building, including the Brotherhood of Sleeping Car Porters; the law firm of Loomis, Jones, Piper and Colden; attorney Harold Bledsoe; optometrists William H. and Lloyd Lawson; and future judges Damon Keith and Hobart Taylor Jr.
8	Broadway Avenue Historic District	Broadway Avenue Historic District	July 1, 2004 (#04000656)	Broadway between Gratiot and Grand River Boulevard; 42°20′06″N 83°02′46″W	Downtown	The Broadway Avenue Historic District is located along a single block of Broadway Avenue, and contains eleven commercial structures built between 1896 and 1926. The area was developed in the late 19th century as a commercial area catering to the women's trade, and included businesses such as hairdressers, florists, corset makers, and fashionable clothiers. Three buildings in the district — the Cary Building, the Breitmeyer–Tobin Building, and the Merchants Building — are individually listed on the NRHP.
9	Capitol Park Historic District	Capitol Park Historic District	March 18, 1999 (#99000338)	Roughly bounded by Grand River Ave., Woodward Ave., Michigan Ave., and Washington Boulevard; 42°19′58″N 83°02′58″W	Downtown	Capitol Park itself is a triangular plot of land (now a public park) bounded by Shelby Street, Griswold Street, and State Street. A courthouse was built in Capitol Park in 1823-28; when Michigan became a state in 1837, the building served as the state capitol. The Historic District includes the park and seventeen surrounding buildings for a block in each direction, including the Farwell Building, the Griswold Building, the David Stott Building, and the Industrial Building.
10	Cary Building	Cary Building	November 25, 1983 (#83003670)	229 Gratiot Ave. 42°20′08″N 83°02′49″W	Downtown	The construction of the Cary Building in 1905 began a transformation of Broadway (then called Miami Avenue) from an upper-class residential area into a fashionable commercial district.
11	Cass Avenue Methodist Episcopal Church	Cass Avenue Methodist Episcopal Church	December 10, 1982 (#82000548)	3901 Cass Ave. 42°20′53″N 83°03′47″W	Midtown: North Cass	The original portion of this Richardson Romanesque church was designed in 1883 by Mason and Rice; the main portion was designed in 1891 by Malcomson and Higginbotham.
12	Cass Motor Sales	Cass Motor Sales	April 29, 1986 (#86001039)	5800 Cass Ave. 42°21′43″N 83°04′12″W	Midtown: Wayne State	The Cass Motor Sales building typifies Art Deco architecture as applied to commercial buildings; it was designed and built in 1928 as a Marmon Motor Company showroom, dealership, and service center.
13	Cass Park Historic District	Cass Park Historic District	February 2, 2005 (#04001580)	Temple, Ledyard, and 2nd at Cass Park; 42°20′28″N 83°03′35″W	Midtown: Cass Park	This historic district surrounds Cass Park itself, and contains over 20 buildings including apartments, a hotel, the Detroit Masonic Temple, the S. S. Kresge World Headquarters, and Cass Technical High School.
14	Cass-Davenport Historic District	Cass-Davenport Historic District	September 22, 1997 (#97001100)	Roughly bounded Cass Ave., Davenport, and Martin Luther King Jr. Boulevard; 42°20′46″N 83°03′40″W	Midtown: North Cass	The Cass-Davenport Historic District includes four apartment buildings near the corner of Cass Avenue and Martin Luther King Jr. Boulevard. Two are typical of the small scale, luxurious apartment buildings built in Detroit near the turn of the century and two are typical of the large scale, high density apartment buildings constructed between 1915 and 1930.
15	Cathedral Church of St. Paul Complex	Cathedral Church of St. Paul Complex	August 3, 1982 (#82002893)	4800 Woodward Ave. 42°21′22″N 83°03′50″W	Midtown: Medical Center	The Cathedral Church of St. Paul is the cathedral church of the Episcopal Diocese of Michigan. It was designed by renowned church architect Ralph Adams Cram, and remains unfinished, the bell tower having never been completed. The church is built entirely of limestone, using Medieval construction techniques, with no supporting steel superstructure.
16	Central United Methodist Church	Central United Methodist Church	August 3, 1982 (#82002895)	Woodward Ave. at E. Adams St. 42°20′15″N 83°03′03″W	Downtown	The Central United Methodist Church was first organized in 1802, and was the first organized Protestant congregation in what was then the Michigan Territory. The cornerstone of Central Church's current sanctuary was laid on July 3, 1867.
17	Century Building and Little Theatre	Century Building and Little Theatre	May 9, 1985 (#85000993)	333 Madison St. 42°20′15″N 83°02′47″W	Downtown	In 1902, the Twentieth Century Club built a Mission-style building to house their club. In 1928, a Spanish Revival-style addition was built and leased to the Little Theater chain. The Twentieth Century Club disbanded in the depths of the Great Depression, and the building went through numerous owners and name changes. In 1997, the buildings, now known as the Gem Theatre, were moved five blocks to make way for the construction of Comerica Park. At a distance of 563 meters (1,850 ft) it is the furthest known relocation of a sizable building.
18	Chapel of St. Theresa-the Little Flower	Chapel of St. Theresa-the Little Flower	September 22, 1997 (#97001099)	46 Parsons St. 42°20′54″N 83°03′36″W	Midtown: North Cass	The Irish St. Patrick Parish in Detroit was begun in 1862, and built a large church on Woodward Avenue. In 1892, they built the Saints Peter and Paul Academy on Parsons. As traffic in the streets increased, the parish built this chapel next door to the school to eliminate the trek by school children to the main church. As the years passed, more parish activities were held in the chapel. The old St. Patrick burned in 1992, and the chapel was rechristened St. Patrick Church.
19	Alexander Chapoton House	Alexander Chapoton House	March 10, 1980 (#80001919)	511 Beaubien St. 42°19′54″N 83°02′26″W	Downtown	This home is a Queen Anne style row house, one of the last remaining examples in the city. It was built by Alexander Chapoton, a descendant of one of the oldest families in Detroit.
20	Chatsworth Apartments	Chatsworth Apartments	May 1, 1986 (#86001001)	630 Merrick St. 42°21′27″N 83°04′16″W	Midtown: Wayne State	The Chatsworth Apartments is a nine-story apartment building, built in 1927 of reinforced concrete with tan-colored brick and tile. It includes an underground parking garage with a sixty-five car capacity – an uncommon feature at the time.
21	The Clay School	The Clay School	July 8, 1982 (#82002913)	453 Martin Luther King, Jr. Boulevard; 42°20′42″N 83°03′42″W	Midtown: North Cass	The Clay School, built in 1888, is the oldest existing school building in the city of Detroit. The building served as an elementary school, a center for boys with discipline problems, and a headquarters for vocational study. In 1981, the building was sold to a developer, who converted the building into office space, known as the Clay Office and Conference Center.
22	Coronado Apartments	Coronado Apartments	April 22, 1982 (#82002897)	3751-73 Second Ave. 42°20′49″N 83°03′52″W	Midtown: North Cass	The Coronado Apartments is a four-story Romanesque Revival building, built in 1894 as one of the first apartments buildings in Detroit targeting affluent middle class tenants at a time when apartment living was just becoming socially acceptable. The Coronado remained a fashionable address until the 1930s, when declining demand for large apartments led the Coronado's owners to divide the formerly spacious apartments in two.
23	Cultural Center Historic District	Cultural Center Historic District	November 21, 1983 (#83003791)	5200, 5201 Woodward Ave., and 100 Farnsworth Ave. 42°21′31″N 83°03′57″W	Midtown: Art Center	The Cultural Center Historic District includes three buildings along Woodward Avenue: the Detroit Public Library, the Detroit Institute of Arts, and the Horace H. Rackham Education Memorial Building.
24	Detroit Association of Women's Clubs Building	Detroit Association of Women's Clubs Building	December 2, 2024 (#100011153)	5461 Brush Street. 42°21′45″N 83°03′45″W	Midtown: Art Center	The Civil Rights Movement and the African American Experience in 20th Century Detroit MPS
25	Detroit Club	Detroit Club	February 2, 2005 (#04001577)	712 Cass Ave. 42°19′47″N 83°03′03″W	Downtown	The Detroit Club is a four-story brick and stone Romanesque Revival building constructed in 1891. It is the third home of the club, which formed in 1882 as a place where local businessmen could meet and mingle. Early club members included Russell A. Alger, ex-governor of Michigan, Hugh McMillan, founder of the Michigan Telephone Company, and real estate magnate James B. Book.
26	Detroit Cornice and Slate Company Building	Detroit Cornice and Slate Company Building	December 16, 1974 (#74001000)	733 St. Antoine St. at E. Lafayette St. 42°20′04″N 83°02′26″W	Downtown	This building was designed in the Beaux-Arts style by architect Harry J. Rill, and completed in 1897. The ornamental facade is constructed from galvanized steel; many of the decorative and sculptural elements were crafted by the Detroit Cornice and Slate Company itself.
27	Detroit Edison Company Willis Avenue Station	Detroit Edison Company Willis Avenue Station	September 22, 1997 (#97001097)	50 W. Willis St. 42°21′06″N 83°03′43″W	Midtown: North Cass	The Willis Avenue station was the first steam power substation used by Detroit Edison for the production of steam heat. Three other plants serve the central heating district of Detroit.
28	Detroit Financial District	Detroit Financial District	December 14, 2009 (#09001067)	Bounded by Woodward and Jefferson and Lafayette and Washington Boulevard; 42°19′46″N 83°02′50″W	Downtown	This historic area was the financial heart of Detroit from the 1850s through the 1970s. The area encompasses some of the largest and more ornate skyscrapers in Detroit (including the Guardian Building, the Penobscot Building, and One Woodward Avenue), reflecting two waves of large-scale redevelopment: the first in 1900–1930 and the second in the 1950s and early 1960s.
29	Detroit Industry Murals, Detroit Institute of Arts	Detroit Industry Murals, Detroit Institute of Arts	April 22, 2014 (#14000279)	5200 Woodward Ave. 42°21′34″N 83°03′52″W	Midtown: Art Center	These four murals at the Detroit Institute of Arts are considered to be the finest remaining work in the United States by renowned Mexican muralist Diego Rivera, and the nation's finest modern, monumental artwork with industrial themes.
30	Detroit Masonic Temple	Detroit Masonic Temple	November 28, 1980 (#80001920)	500 Temple St. 42°20′30″N 83°03′37″W	Midtown: Cass Park	The 14-story Detroit Temple is the largest Masonic Temple in the world, boasting a 4,404-seat theater, a 1,586-seat Scottish Rite Cathedral, a 17,500-square-foot (1,630 m^{2}) drill hall, and two ballrooms—one of which measures 17,264 square feet (1,603.9 m^{2}) and holds up to 1,000. It was constructed in 1922.
31	Detroit News Complex	Detroit News Complex	December 29, 2015 (#15000947)	615 and 801 W. Lafayette Blvd. 42°19′43″N 83°03′15″W	Downtown	This building held the offices of the Detroit News from 1917 to 2013, and was also the site of the first commercial radio broadcast (on WWJ) in the United States.
32	Detroit-Columbia Central Office Building	Detroit-Columbia Central Office Building	September 22, 1997 (#97001098)	52 Selden St. 42°20′58″N 83°03′38″W	Midtown: North Cass	This Art Deco building was built in the 1920s as a "dial system" office building for Michigan Bell. It is still owned by AT&T, the successor of Michigan Bell, and is known as the Michigan Bell Telephone Exchange.
33	Detroit-Leland Hotel	Detroit-Leland Hotel	July 20, 2005 (#05000718)	400 Bagley St. 42°20′01″N 83°03′15″W	Downtown	The Detroit-Leland Hotel (named for Cadillac founder Henry M. Leland) opened its doors in 1927. It boasted 800 air-conditioned hotel rooms, along with a dining room, coffee shop, ball room, and 11 stores at street level.
34	Dunbar Hospital	Dunbar Hospital	June 19, 1979 (#79001172)	580 Frederick St. 42°21′42″N 83°03′32″W	Midtown: Art Center	The Dunbar Hospital (named for poet Paul Laurence Dunbar) was the first hospital in Detroit for the black community. The building was built in 1892 as a private residence; it was converted to a hospital in 1918 by Dr. James W. Ames and the Allied Medical Society. It is now the Detroit Medical Society Headquarters.
35	East Ferry Avenue Historic District	East Ferry Avenue Historic District	March 10, 1980 (#80001921)	E. Ferry Ave. 42°21′42″N 83°03′56″W	Midtown: Art Center	In the mid-1880s, D. M. Ferry platted his seed farm near Woodward into residential lots. East Ferry Avenue was quickly settled by prosperous middle and upper middle class Detroit residents. Although Woodward Avenue has since been redeveloped into primarily commercial property, the mansions and upscale housing on East Ferry survives. The district includes the separately designated Col. Frank J. Hecker House and the Charles Lang Freer House.
36	Eddystone Hotel	Eddystone Hotel	July 12, 2006 (#06000588)	100-118 Sproat St. 42°20′30″N 83°03′25″W	Midtown: Cass Park	The Eddystone is one of three hotels located on Park Avenue and designed by Louis Kamper for Lew Tuller; the other two are the Royal Palm at 2305 Park Avenue, and the Park Avenue Hotel at 2643 Park Avenue (site across Sproat from the Eddystone).
37	Elwood Bar	Elwood Bar	May 15, 1985 (#85001074)	300 E. Adams St. 42°20′18″N 83°02′49″W	Downtown	The Elwood Bar was built in 1936 at 2100 Woodward Avenue (on the corner of Woodward and Elizabeth); it has since been moved to 300 Adams. Designed by Charles Noble, the building is an excellent Detroit example of Art Moderne Style, with two facades covered with cream and blue enameled steel. It is now known as the Elwood Bar and Grill.
38	Farwell Building	Farwell Building	April 30, 1976 (#76001037)	1249 Griswold St. 42°20′00″N 83°03′00″W	Downtown	The Farwell Building is named for the estate of Jesse H. and Emmer J. Farwell. The building was completed in 1915 from plans made by architect Harrie W. Bonnah. There is iron grillwork on the entrance transom, and the interior features a Tiffany mosaic ceiling, brass elevator doors, and marble walls.
39	Federal Reserve Bank of Chicago Detroit Branch Building	Federal Reserve Bank of Chicago Detroit Branch Building	January 29, 2008 (#07001491)	160 W. Fort St. 42°19′51″N 83°02′56″W	Downtown	This building was constructed in 1927 in a Neoclassical style. In 1951, an eight-story Modern glass-and-marble annex, designed by Minoru Yamasaki, was added to the building.
40	First Congregational Church	First Congregational Church	June 4, 1979 (#79001173)	33 E. Forest Ave. 42°21′19″N 83°03′46″W	Midtown: North Cass	The First Congregational Church was built in 1891; an addition to the church, known as the Angel's Wing, was constructed in 1921 by Albert Kahn. The church is topped by an 8-foot (2.4 m) copper figure of the Archangel Uriel.
41	First Federal Building	First Federal Building	December 11, 2013 (#13000906)	1001 Woodward Ave. 42°19′55″N 83°02′51″W	Downtown	Now simply known as 1001 Woodward, the First Federal Building was designed by Smith, Hinchman & Grylls in the International Style, and constructed in 1963-65 as the headquarters for First Federal Savings and Loan of Detroit.
42	First Presbyterian Church	First Presbyterian Church	December 19, 1979 (#79001174)	2930 Woodward Ave. 42°20′39″N 83°03′19″W	Midtown: Brush Park	George D. Mason modeled the First Presbyterian Church after Henry Hobson Richardson's Trinity Church in Boston. The church is made from rough-cut red sandstone, with the floorplan in the shape of a Greek cross. It is currently used as the Ecumenical Theological Seminary.
43	First Unitarian Church of Detroit	First Unitarian Church of Detroit	August 3, 1982 (#82002899)	2870 Woodward Ave. 42°20′38″N 83°03′19″W	Midtown: Brush Park	The First Unitarian Church of Detroit was designed by Donaldson and Meier in the Romanesque Revival style and completed in 1890. It caught fire on May 10, 2014, and was consequently demolished.
44	Fort Shelby Hotel	Fort Shelby Hotel	November 25, 1983 (#83003695)	525 W. Lafayette Boulevard; 42°19′44″N 83°03′14″W	Downtown	The Fort Shelby is a 22-story Beaux-Arts hotel, built in two stages in 1916 and 1927. It served as a hotel until the mid-1970s, when low occupancy rates forced its closure. The building was purchased in 2007, and plans to open in late 2008 as the DoubleTree Guest Suites Fort Shelby Hotel.
45	Fort Street Presbyterian Church	Fort Street Presbyterian Church	September 3, 1971 (#71000424)	631 W. Fort St. 42°19′39″N 83°03′14″W	Downtown	The Fort Street Presbyterian Church was originally constructed in 1855, and was completely rebuilt to the original plans after a disastrous fire in 1876. It is a premiere example of Gothic Revival architecture in America.
46	Fox Theatre Building	Fox Theatre Building	February 14, 1985 (#85000280)	2211 Woodward Ave. 42°20′18″N 83°03′09″W	Downtown	The Detroit Fox is the largest of the Fox Theatres. Built in 1928 for William Fox, founder of 20th Century Fox, it was the first movie palace to have live sound. The architect, C. Howard Crane, designed a lavish interior blend of Burmese, Chinese, Indian and Persian motifs. The theatre was restored in 1988 by Mike and Marian Ilitch, at a cost of $12 million.
47	Charles Lang Freer House	Charles Lang Freer House	April 16, 1971 (#71000426)	71 E. Ferry Ave. 42°21′43″N 83°03′57″W	Midtown: Art Center	This home was originally built by the industrialist and art collector Charles Lang Freer, a founder of the Peninsular Car Company. It is currently the Merrill Palmer Institute of Human Development & Family Life of Wayne State University.
48	GAR Building	GAR Building	February 13, 1986 (#86000262)	1942 Grand River Ave. 42°20′06″N 83°03′19″W	Downtown	The Grand Army of the Republic (GAR) Building was constructed as meeting hall for the Grand Army of the Republic, a Civil War veterans association.
49	Garden Bowl	Garden Bowl	July 3, 2008 (#08000578)	4104-4120 Woodward Ave. 42°21′05″N 83°03′36″W	Midtown: Medical Center	The Garden Bowl was built in 1913, and is Detroit's oldest continuously operating bowling alley. In 1934, the front 35 feet (11 m) of the building were removed when Woodward Avenue was widened to its present size. The present appearance of the building is due in large part to changes made in 1966.
50	Edwin S. George Building	Edwin S. George Building	July 22, 1993 (#93000651)	4612 Woodward Ave. 42°21′15″N 83°03′44″W	Midtown: Medical Center	In 1908, Edwin S. George hired architect Albert Kahn to design a two-story building which would include rental space for auto parts suppliers and manufacturers. In 1914, George had three additional floors added to the building (also designed by Kahn) and changed the name to "Garfield Building".
51	Bernard Ginsburg House	Bernard Ginsburg House	August 19, 1991 (#91001015)	236 Adelaide St. 42°20′34″N 83°03′05″W	Midtown: Brush Park	Bernard Ginsburg was an important figure in philanthropy, civic service, and the Jewish community in Detroit during the late 19th and early 20th century. He commissioned young architect Albert Kahn to design this house. Unique and beautiful statues support the porch roof.
52	Globe Tobacco Building	Globe Tobacco Building	November 13, 1984 (#84000442)	407 E. Fort St. 42°19′59″N 83°02′34″W	Downtown	Cigar manufacturing was once the largest industry in Detroit. Globe Tobacco, established in 1871 by O. P. Hazard, Thomas McGraw, Hiram Walker, and William Moore, was one of the largest five cigar manufacturers in the city. They built this plant in 1888.
53	Grand Circus Park Historic District	Grand Circus Park Historic District	February 28, 1983 (#83000894)	Roughly bounded by Clifford, John R. and Adams Sts.; also 25 W. Elizabeth; 42°20′10″N 83°03′02″W	Downtown	The Grand Circus Park Historic District contains the 5-acre (20,000 m^{2}) Grand Circus Park, bisected by Woodward Avenue. Notable buildings encircling the park include the David Broderick Tower and David Whitney Building on the south, the Kales Building, former Adams Theater, and the Central United Methodist Church on the north, and Comerica Park and the Detroit Opera House on the East. In 2000, the district boundary was increased to include 25 W. Elizabeth.
54	Graybar Electric Company Building	Graybar Electric Company Building	September 22, 1997 (#97001096)	55 W. Canfield St. 42°21′08″N 83°03′45″W	Midtown: North Cass	This warehouse building was rented to the Graybar Electric Company from 1926 into the 1940s. The building has been redeveloped into loft space, and is currently known as the Lofts at 55 West Canfield.
55	Great Lakes Manor	Great Lakes Manor	March 16, 2020 (#100005085)	457 East Kirby St. 42°21′45″N 83°03′40″W	Midtown: Art Center	Great Lakes Manor was originally called the Kirby Manor Apartments. It was built in 1925 in what was then a predominantly Jewish neighborhood. In 1936, the building was purchased by the Great Lakes Land and Investment Company, a subsidiary of the Great Lakes Mutual Insurance Company, one of the largest African-American businesses in the state of Michigan. Great Lakes Manor was at that time one of the few places middle class African Americans could live.
56	Greektown Historic District	Greektown Historic District	May 6, 1982 (#82002902)	Monroe Ave., between Brush and St. Antoine Sts. 42°20′06″N 83°02′32″W	Downtown	Greektown is a primarily commercial district that extends two city blocks. It includes the St. Mary Roman Catholic Church, the Second Baptist Church, separately listed on the Register, the Hollywood Casino, and the Athenium Suite Hotel. The district contains numerous restaurants and Greek-themed shops.
57	Robert M. and Matilda (Kitch) Grindley House	Robert M. and Matilda (Kitch) Grindley House	December 1, 1997 (#97001475)	123 Parsons St. 42°20′51″N 83°03′39″W	Midtown: North Cass	The Robert and Matilda Kitch Grindley House was constructed in 1897 as a single-family dwelling for the Grindley family, which played an important role in Detroit's philanthropic community. The house was owned by the Grindley family until 1961, and was demolished in 1998.
58	Griswold Building	Griswold Building	June 9, 1980 (#80001923)	1214 Griswold St. 42°19′59″N 83°02′56″W	Downtown	This 12-story, brick-and-limestone building is significant as an example of architect Albert Kahn's transition from Art Deco to Art Moderne. It is now the Griswold Building Senior Apartments.
59	Guardian Building	Guardian Building	June 29, 1989 (#89001165)	500 Griswold St. 42°19′47″N 83°02′45″W	Downtown	The Guardian Building is a National Historic Landmark, and is a bold example of Art Deco architecture. The exterior blends brickwork with tile, limestone, and terracotta. The building's interior is lavishly decorated with mosaic and Pewabic and Rookwood tile.
60	The Harmonie Club	The Harmonie Club	September 4, 1980 (#80001924)	267 E. Grand River Ave. 42°20′11″N 83°02′48″W	Downtown	The Harmonie Club is a four-story, hipped-roof building with a basement, built of buff-colored brick and stone. The curved corner is particularly shaped to the geometry of the site. It was built by the Gesang-Verein Harmonie, a German singing club founded in 1849.
61	Philip A. Hart Plaza	Philip A. Hart Plaza	August 30, 2024 (#100003554)	1 Hart Plaza; 42°19′38″N 83°02′39″W	Downtown	
62	John Harvey House	John Harvey House	April 3, 1991 (#91000354)	97 Winder St. 42°20′30″N 83°03′08″W	Midtown: Brush Park	John Harvey was a successful pharmacist in Detroit, but he is best known for his philanthropy in educating and feeding the city's poor children and orphans. He built this 11,000-square-foot (1,000 m^{2}) mansion in 1887, living in it until his death in 1905. The current owners purchased the John Harvey House in 1986, renovated the structure, and opened it as The Inn at 97 Winder in 2005.
63	Col. Frank J. Hecker House	Col. Frank J. Hecker House	September 3, 1971 (#71000427)	5510 Woodward Ave. 42°21′42″N 83°04′01″W	Midtown: Art Center	Col. Frank J. Hecker founded the Peninsular Car Company (with Charles Lang Freer, whose home is next to Hecker's). In 1888, Hecker built this 49-room mansion where he hosted elaborate parties, entertaining Presidents William McKinley and Rutherford B. Hayes. Col. Hecker lived in the home until his death in 1927.
64	Hotel Stevenson	Hotel Stevenson	September 22, 1997 (#97001095)	40 Davenport St. 42°20′50″N 83°03′33″W	Midtown: North Cass	This structure, built in 1913, was designed as an apartment hotel, offering primarily efficiency and one bedroom units rather than the two to four-room suites contained in typical apartment buildings of the time. It was designed to house the influx of transient male workers who came to Detroit to work in the booming auto industry.
65	Hudson-Evans House	Hudson-Evans House	March 5, 1975 (#75000966)	79 Alfred St. 42°20′37″N 83°03′13″W	Midtown: Brush Park	The Hudson-Evans House was built circa 1872/73 for Philo Wright, a Detroit-based ship owner. In 1882, the house was given as a wedding present to Grace Whitney Evans, daughter of the lumber baron David Whitney Jr. (builder of the David Whitney House). Between 1894 and 1904 Mrs. Evans rented the house to Joseph Lowthian Hudson, founder of Detroit's J.L. Hudson Company department store.
66	Mulford T. Hunter House	Mulford T. Hunter House	July 22, 1994 (#94000757)	77 W. Hancock St. 42°21′19″N 83°03′53″W	Midtown: North Cass	This structure is a Queen Anne townhouse, one of the few remaining examples in the city of Detroit. The house is directly adjacent to the George W. Loomer House; the two are the only remaining buildings from the 19th century in what was at the time one of Detroit's most fashionable areas.
67	Jefferson Intermediate School	Jefferson Intermediate School	September 22, 1997 (#97001094)	938 Selden St. 42°20′48″N 83°04′07″W	Midtown: North Cass	An elementary school was built on this site in 1873. In 1922, the city tore down the now dilapidated building and began construction of the building now occupying the site. This building was completed in 1923. As of 2008, the building has been rehabilitated and now serves as a charter school. Jefferson Intermediate School is also known as Jefferson Junior High School or simply Jefferson School.
68	Albert Kahn House	Albert Kahn House	October 18, 1972 (#72000668)	208 Mack Ave. 42°20′54″N 83°03′21″W	Midtown: Brush Park	In 1906, architect Albert Kahn built a home for his personal use in Brush Park. He lived in the home from 1906 until his death in 1942. Kahn's home is designed in the English Renaissance style, but with modern look. The first story is clad in brick with a gray stone trim, the second story is stuccoed, and the roof is slate. In 1928, Kahn added a wing to house his library and art collection. After Kahn's death, the Detroit Urban League obtained the building and have retained it to the present as their offices.
69	L. B. King and Company Building	L. B. King and Company Building	June 12, 1987 (#87000927)	1274 Library St. 42°20′05″N 83°02′51″W	Downtown	The L. B. King Company was a wholesale china firm; they had this white terracotta-clad Chicago-style office building constructed in 1910 (the elaborate cornice was added in 1926). The firm moved out in 1932, and the building was taken over by Annis Furs, who owned it until 1983. The building is also known as the Annis Furs Building.
70	S. S. Kresge World Headquarters	S. S. Kresge World Headquarters	December 19, 1979 (#79001175)	2727 2nd Ave. 42°20′24″N 83°03′43″W	Midtown: Cass Park	The Kresge World Headquarters is a limestone-faced building, designed in 1928 by Albert Kahn for S.S. Kresge (now K-Mart) as their world headquarters. The building, unique for its horizontal massing as opposed to the vertical lines of the more common skyscraper, won awards for its outstanding architecture.
71	Lancaster and Waumbek Apartments	Lancaster and Waumbek Apartments	August 21, 1997 (#97000921)	227-29 and 237-39 E. Palmer Ave. 42°21′47″N 83°03′55″W	Midtown: Art Center	The Lancaster and Waumbek Apartments were two small three-story apartment buildings of similar design located side-by-side on East Palmer. The two structures were well-designed examples of turn-of-the-century apartment houses in Detroit. They were demolished in November 2005.
72	Lawyers Building	Lawyers Building	April 22, 1982 (#82002903)	137 Cadillac Sq. 42°19′55″N 83°02′38″W	Downtown	The Lawyers Building, also known as the "American Title Building", was built in 1922 by John J. Barlum, as part of an effort (along with the nearby Barlum Tower, also on the Register) to rehabilitate Cadillac Square. The ten-story Lawyers Building originally housed middle-class tenant organizations, including unions and charitable organizations.
73	League of Catholic Women Building	League of Catholic Women Building	September 22, 1997 (#97001093)	100 Parsons St. 42°20′52″N 83°03′41″W	Midtown: North Cass	This building was constructed in 1927 to provide accommodations for single young women looking for work in the city; it was built by the League of Catholic Women, a charitable organization. In 1982, the building was converted into 82 apartment units for low-income elderly and/or handicapped with Section 8 rent subsidies. The building is known as Casgrain Hall or the Activities Building.
74	George W. Loomer House	George W. Loomer House	July 22, 1994 (#94000753)	71 W. Hancock St. 42°21′20″N 83°03′52″W	Midtown: North Cass	The George W. Loomer House is a private residence built in the Richardsonian Romanesque style. The home is directly adjacent to the Mulford T. Hunter House; the two are the only remaining buildings from the 19th century in what was at the time one of Detroit's most fashionable areas.
75	Lower Woodward Avenue Historic District	Lower Woodward Avenue Historic District	February 12, 1999 (#99000051)	1202–1449 and 1400–1456 Woodward Ave. 42°20′03″N 83°02′56″W	Downtown	The Lower Woodward Avenue Historic District contains thirty-four commercial buildings built between the end of the 19th century and the beginning of the twentieth, many by noted architects. By the 1920s, this area of the city was one of the most active shopping districts in the nation; in 1925, the State and Woodward intersection was the most active pedestrian crossing corner in the U.S.
76	Maccabees Building	Maccabees Building	July 7, 1983 (#83003436)	5057 Woodward Ave. 42°21′28″N 83°03′56″W	Midtown: Wayne State	The building was originally constructed for the fraternal organization Knights of the Maccabees. Surplus space in the building was leased to other businesses, including retail business on the ground floor and office space in the upper floors. One noteworthy tenant was Detroit's radio and television station WXYZ.
77	Majestic Theater	Majestic Theater	July 2, 2008 (#08000577)	4140 Woodward Ave. 42°21′05″N 83°03′37″W	Midtown: Medical Center	The Majestic Theater, designed by C. Howard Crane, opened on April 1, 1915. The theater originally seated 1,651 people and was at the time the largest theater in the world built for the purpose of showing movies. In 1934, the front 35 feet (11 m) of the theater were removed when Woodward Avenue was widened to its present size, and the entire facade was redesigned into its current striking Art Deco motif.
78	Mariners' Church	Mariners' Church	March 11, 1971 (#71000428)	170 E. Jefferson Ave. 42°19′46″N 83°02′31″W	Downtown	Mariners' Church of Detroit is a parish in the Anglican tradition. The church was established in 1842 and incorporated in the state of Michigan in 1848; the current building was constructed in 1849.
79	Perry McAdow House	Perry McAdow House	July 3, 1980 (#80004405)	4605 Cass Ave. 42°21′11″N 83°03′56″W	Midtown: North Cass	Perry W. McAdow earned his fortune gold mining in Montana. In 1891, he and his wife Clara built this elaborate Renaissance Revival mansion on Cass for a cost of $65,000 as an entrance into Detroit society.
80	McGregor Memorial Conference Center	McGregor Memorial Conference Center	December 13, 2010 (#10001023)	495 Ferry Mall; 42°21′34″N 83°04′15″W	Midtown: Wayne State	Completed in 1958, the McGregor Memorial Conference Center was Minoru Yamasaki's first commission following his trip to Japan and re-envisionment of architectural design. The Center opened to immediate accolades from architectural magazines who called it "delightful" and "refreshing".
81	Merchants Building	Merchants Building	November 25, 1983 (#83003732)	206 E. Grand River Boulevard; 42°20′05″N 83°02′45″W	Downtown	The eight-story Merchants Building is built from steel and reinforced concrete, and wrapped with terracotta. Throughout its history, the building has housed many business, including at least three furriers, Midwest Woolen Co., Kroger Grocery & Bakery, New York Life Insurance Co., a jeweler and shoe repair shop.
82	Michigan Soldiers' and Sailors' Monument	Michigan Soldiers' and Sailors' Monument	May 31, 1984 (#84001862)	Woodward Ave. at Campus Martius; 42°19′54″N 83°02′48″W	Downtown	Sculptor Randolph Rogers designed this monument as a series of octagonal sections that rise up from the base of the monument. The lowest sections are topped by eagles with raised wings that guide the eye upward to the next section, which is surmounted by four male figures depicting the Navy, Infantry, Cavalry, and Artillery. Four female allegorical figures, resting on pedestals above the male statues, represent Victory, History, Emancipation, and Union; they were added to the monument in 1881.
83	Midtown Woodward Historic District	Midtown Woodward Historic District	November 26, 2008 (#08001106)	2951-3424 Woodward Ave., 14 Charlotte St., 10 and 25 Peterboro St. 42°20′44″N 83°03′24″W	Midtown: Cass Park	The Midtown Woodward Historic District spans two blocks along Woodward Avenue, and contains three Albert Kahn-designed structures—the Addison Hotel, Kahn Print Shop, and the Temple Beth-El (now a theater)—in addition to the C. Howard Crane-designed Fine Arts Theatre.
84	Monroe Avenue Commercial Buildings	Monroe Avenue Commercial Buildings	February 13, 1975 (#75000968)	16-118 Monroe St. 42°19′58″N 83°02′45″W	Downtown	This was once a block of 19th-century commercial building interspersed with early-20th-century movie palaces. However, the district was almost entirely demolished as of February 1990, leaving only the Albert Kahn-designed National Theater at 118 Monroe standing.
85	Helen Newberry Nurses Home	Helen Newberry Nurses Home	July 3, 2008 (#08000576)	100 E. Willis Ave. 42°21′07″N 83°03′32″W	Midtown: Medical Center	The Helen Newberry Nurses Home was built to house nursing students from the Grace Hospital Training School for Nurses. It was named for Helen Handy Newberry, wife of John Stoughton Newberry and mother of Truman Handy Newberry.
86	Orchestra Hall	Orchestra Hall	April 16, 1971 (#71000429)	3711 Woodward Ave. 42°20′55″N 83°03′33″W	Midtown: North Cass	Orchestra Hall is the home of the Detroit Symphony Orchestra. The 2014-seat hall was designed by architect C. Howard Crane; the building was vacant for a number of years, but major restoration work was accomplished in the 1970s.
87	Francis Palms Building & State Theater	Francis Palms Building & State Theater	November 24, 1982 (#82000551)	2115 Woodward Ave. 42°20′16″N 83°03′07″W	Downtown	The theater was designed by architect C. Howard Crane in the Renaissance Revival style as a movie house, seating 3000. The theatre is located next to the larger Fox Theatre, and is still used as a concert venue. The theater is now known as The Fillmore Detroit, although the building is still called the Francis Palms Building.
88	Park Avenue Historic District	Park Avenue Historic District	May 13, 1997 (#97000396)	Park Ave., between W. Adams Ave. and W. Fisher Freeway; 42°20′15″N 83°03′13″W	Downtown	In the 1920s, Detroit's prestigious Grand Circus Park was crowded with buildings and development began to spill north from Grand Circus Park up Park Avenue. In 1923, the Park Avenue Association was formed. They planned the street to concentrate high-grade commercial and office space at the south end, and prestigious residential development at the north end, much like New York City's Fifth Avenue. The district includes the Detroit Women's City Club, and the Royal Palm.
89	Pontchartrain Club/Town House Apartments	Pontchartrain Club/Town House Apartments	April 19, 2016 (#16000181)	1511 First St. 42°19′58″N 83°03′18″W	Downtown	Originally designed by Wirt C. Rowland, this structure was built in two distinct phases: construction started in 1928 but was soon halted by the Great Depression, and the building was left open to the elements for two decades before being finally completed in 1953. Its façade boasts a unique blend of Art Deco and International Style architectural elements.
90	Prentis Building and DeRoy Auditorium Complex	Prentis Building and DeRoy Auditorium Complex	May 3, 2011 (#11000222)	5203 Cass Ave. 42°21′32″N 83°04′06″W	Midtown: Wayne State	The Prentis Building and DeRoy Auditorium were both built at the same time, and were designed by architect Minoru Yamasaki to interrelate functionally, spatially, and architecturally. The buildings were constructed at a critical point in Yamasaki's career when he was experimenting with ornamentation, light and shadow, and the use of pools and gardens to soften perception of standard International Style architecture.
91	Professional Plaza Tower	Professional Plaza Tower	April 19, 2016 (#16000182)	3800 Woodward Ave. 42°20′58″N 83°03′33″W	Midtown: Medical Center	The Professional Plaza Tower was built between 1964 and 1966 as part of the Detroit Medical Center urban renewal plan. Designed by architects Crane and Gorwic in the International Style, it originally housed offices for medical professionals. It is being converted into a 75-unit residential apartment.
92	Randolph Street Commercial Buildings Historic District	Randolph Street Commercial Buildings Historic District	July 8, 1980 (#80004404)	1208–1244 Randolph St. 42°20′04″N 83°02′42″W	Downtown	Buildings along this section of Randolph Street have been used for retail since the area was first built up in the 1840s; the building at 1244 Randolph was built during the period of original construction. As the city grew, larger commercial buildings were required and the other structures on Randolph were constructed.
93	Jerome H. Remick and Company Building	Jerome H. Remick and Company Building	July 25, 1996 (#96000804)	1250 Library St. 42°20′04″N 83°02′49″W	Downtown	This building was originally constructed in 1907 with three floors for Jerome H. Remick & Company. Remick was a leading publisher of ragtime music such as "Dill Pickles Rag" and "Black and White Rag", and used the building to house their offices and printing facilities. Remick moved out of the building in 1915, at around the same time that the upper three floors were added.
94	Royal Palm Hotel	Royal Palm Hotel	July 25, 1996 (#96000812)	2305 Park Ave. 42°20′18″N 83°03′16″W	Downtown	The Royal Palm, now known as the Park Avenue House, is the oldest hotel in the downtown Detroit area, and has operated continuously as a hotel since its construction. It is one of three hotels located on Park Avenue and designed by Louis Kamper for Lew Tuller the other two are the Eddystone at 100 Sproat Street, and the Park Avenue Hotel at 2643 Park Avenue.
95	Saint Andrew's Memorial Episcopal Church	Saint Andrew's Memorial Episcopal Church	May 15, 1986 (#86001003)	5105 Anthony Wayne Dr. 42°21′20″N 83°04′24″W	Midtown: Wayne State	St. Andrew's parish, founded in 1885, was one of the earliest religious institutions established in what is now the University–Cultural Center section of Detroit. The present building was completed in 1902. Restorations after a 1906 fire have been criticized as architecturally disfiguring. In 1961, the diocese leased the building to Wayne State University for 99 years.
96	St. John's Episcopal Church	St. John's Episcopal Church	August 3, 1982 (#82002906)	Woodward Ave. at E. Fisher Freeway; 42°20′24″N 83°03′09″W	Downtown	St. John's, built in 1859 primarily through the efforts of Henry P. Baldwin, is the oldest church still standing on Woodward Avenue. The church is an excellent example of Victorian Gothic architecture.
97	St. Josaphat's Roman Catholic Church	St. Josaphat's Roman Catholic Church	December 8, 1982 (#82000555)	715 E. Canfield St. 42°21′24″N 83°03′10″W	Midtown: Medical Center	In 1889, the Polish community of St. Albertus Roman Catholic Church was outgrowing the capacity of the church, and the parish of St. Josaphat was started to serve the growing population. A small church and school was built in 1890, and the large church extant today was constructed in 1901.
98	Sts. Peter and Paul Academy	Sts. Peter and Paul Academy	September 22, 1997 (#97001101)	64 Parsons St. 42°20′54″N 83°03′37″W	Midtown: North Cass	The Saints Peter and Paul Academy was built in 1893 by what is now St. Patrick Parish as a co-ed grade school and a high school for girls. The present-day St. Patrick Church sits next door. The school closed in 1969, and the building is occupied by St. Patrick Senior Center.
99	Saints Peter and Paul Church	Saints Peter and Paul Church	September 3, 1971 (#71000431)	629 E. Jefferson Ave. 42°19′55″N 83°02′18″W	Downtown	The Saints Peter and Paul Church, constructed in 1848, is the oldest existing church in the city of Detroit. It originally served a predominantly Irish population, but since 1877 has been operated by the Jesuit Order. The Jesuit University of Detroit Mercy's law school still sits adjacent to the church.
100	Scarab Club	Scarab Club	November 20, 1979 (#79001176)	217 Farnsworth St. 42°21′35″N 83°03′46″W	Midtown: Art Center	The Scarab Club is an artists' club, gallery, and studio formed in 1907. The clubhouse was built in 1928, and features a second floor lounge unique for its massive ceiling beams signed by more than 230 artists, including Diego Rivera, Norman Rockwell, Marshall Fredericks and Steve "Pablo" Davis.
101	Second Baptist Church Of Detroit	Second Baptist Church Of Detroit	March 19, 1975 (#75000970)	441 Monroe St. 42°20′06″N 83°02′36″W	Downtown	The Second Baptist Church, founded in 1836, is the oldest African American church in the Midwest. From its founding until the end of the Civil War, the church served as a "station" on the Underground Railroad, hosting some 5,000 slaves before their eventual departure to Canada. The current building replaced an earlier structure which was destroyed by fire in 1914.
102	Samuel L. Smith House	Samuel L. Smith House	April 29, 1986 (#86001038)	5035 Woodward Ave. 42°21′26″N 83°03′55″W	Midtown: Wayne State	Samuel L. Smith lived in this house between 1890 and 1917. Smith was one of the most prominent citizens of Detroit at the time, having made his fortune in lumber, shipping, mining and railroad ventures. He later financed many automobile ventures, most notably the Olds Motor Works. Later in the 20th century, the building was used by the Detroit Public Schools, and is now owned by Wayne State University.
103	Thomas S. Sprague House	Thomas S. Sprague House	April 29, 1986 (#86001037)	80 W. Palmer Ave. 42°21′42″N 83°04′11″W	Midtown: Wayne State	The Thomas S. Sprague House was a private residence; it has been demolished.
104	State Savings Bank	State Savings Bank	March 19, 1982 (#82002910)	151 W. Fort St. 42°19′47″N 83°02′53″W	Downtown	The State Savings Bank was organized in 1883, and by 1900, when this building was constructed, was the largest bank in Detroit. Architect Stanford White designed the original Neoclassical structure for the bank building. In 1914, Donaldson and Meier designed an addition to the building, nearly indistinguishable from the original, that doubled the original size. The building was continuously used as a bank until the 1980s, when it was turned into an office supply showroom. This structure is now known as the Savoyard Centre.
105	Herman Strasburg House	Herman Strasburg House	April 29, 1986 (#86001036)	5415 Cass Ave. 42°21′35″N 83°04′09″W	Midtown: Wayne State	The Herman Strasburg house is one of the best example of English Tudor architecture in Detroit. It was built for dance instructor Herman Strasburg in 1915, and later used as a music school and private home. The building is now the Wayne State University Music Annex.
106	Stuber-Stone Building	Stuber-Stone Building	April 4, 1996 (#96000369)	4221-4229 Cass Ave. 42°21′04″N 83°03′51″W	Midtown: North Cass	The Stuber-Stone Building was built in 1916 as an automobile dealership for Stuber-Stone & Company, distributors of Columbia Motors, which was founded in Detroit by William E. Metzger. The building is now known as the Stuberstone Lofts.
107	Sugar Hill Historic District	Sugar Hill Historic District	March 3, 2003 (#03000068)	Bounded by Woodward, Forest, John R. and Canfield; 42°21′16″N 83°03′40″W	Midtown: Medical Center	Starting in the 1940s, the Sugar Hill Historic District was the center of Detroit's African-American entertainment district. A patchwork of buildings is all that remains.
108	Elisha Taylor House	Elisha Taylor House	March 5, 1975 (#75000971)	59 Alfred St. 42°20′36″N 83°03′16″W	Midtown: Brush Park	The Elisha Taylor House, located within the Brush Park district, was built in 1875 as a private home. It is one of the best examples surviving in Detroit of post-Civil War residential design. Since 1981, it has served as a center for art and architectural study, known as the Art House.
109	Temple Beth-El	Temple Beth-El	August 3, 1982 (#82002911)	3424 Woodward Ave. 42°20′46″N 83°03′25″W	Midtown: Brush Park	This Albert Kahn-designed building was home to Detroit's Temple Beth El from 1903–1921. It was later a playhouse and motion picture theater before being purchased by Wayne State University. The University christened the building the Bonstelle Theatre.
110	Thompson Home	Thompson Home	June 3, 1976 (#76001041)	4756 Cass Ave. 42°21′18″N 83°03′57″W	Midtown: North Cass	The Thompson Home for Old Ladies was built in 1884 as a prestigious retirement home for wealthy widows. It was funded by Mary Thompson at her deceased husband's request. The Home functioned until 1977, when it closed due to the declining number of residents. Wayne State University purchased the building, and in 1980 WSU's School of Social Work was installed in the building.
111	Charles Trombly House	Charles Trombly House	August 13, 1979 (#79001178)	553 E. Jefferson Ave. 42°19′53″N 83°02′21″W	Downtown	The Trombly house is one of Detroit's oldest homes. The consensus among historians is that the house was built by Trombly sometime during 1851 for use by Trombly and his new wife. The house was owned or rented by multiple families. These include some of the city's oldest and most familiar names, such as McClelland, Cicotte, Whipple, Chapoton, Campau, and Beecher, among others. The house is now known as the Beaubien House.
112	Tushiyah United Hebrew School – Scott Memorial Methodist Episcopal Church	Tushiyah United Hebrew School – Scott Memorial Methodist Episcopal Church	September 6, 2011 (#11000616)	609 E. Kirby St. 42°21′48″N 83°03′32″W	Midtown: Art Center	This building, an important work of architect Isadore M. Lewis, was constructed as the Tushiyah United Hebrew School and served as the headquarters of the United Hebrew Schools of Detroit. It later served as the Scott Memorial Methodist Episcopal Church, the first mainline African-American Methodist Episcopal church in Detroit.
113	U.S. Post Office, Court House, and Custom House	U.S. Post Office, Court House, and Custom House	April 27, 2018 (#100002381)	231 W Lafayette Blvd. 42°19′49″N 83°02′59″W	Downtown	This building, now known as the Theodore Levin United States Courthouse, was constructed in 1932-34 on the site of the previous 1897 courthouse. The courtroom from the previous building was disassembled and stored during construction, then reassembled on the seventh floor of the new building.
114	Verona Apartments	Verona Apartments	April 29, 1986 (#86001040)	92 W. Ferry Ave. 42°21′40″N 83°04′09″W	Midtown: Wayne State	The Verona Apartments were built in 1896; the original layout of the apartment building had 16 luxury suites. When home ownership became easier in the 1930s, demand for this type of suite apartment declined, and in 1945 the building was reconfigured to include 26 smaller apartments. There are interesting decorative touches throughout the exterior of the building, including the friezework above the first-floor windows, the bowed structures flanking the entrance, and inlays above the first and fifth floors.
115	Vinton Building	Vinton Building	February 17, 1983 (#83000898)	600 Woodward Ave. 42°19′50″N 83°02′45″W	Downtown	The Vinton Building was designed by Albert Kahn. It stands 14 stories high with 12 above-ground and 2 basement floors. The building was constructed in the Neoclassical architectural style, and features terra cotta as its main material.
116	The Wardell	The Wardell	August 22, 2007 (#07000744)	15 E. Kirby St. 42°21′38″N 83°03′58″W	Midtown: Art Center	The Wardell was built in 1926 as a residential hotel, intended for extended stays. The name comes from Fred Wardell, who owned the Eureka Vacuum Cleaner Company. Diego Rivera lived there while working on his mural at the Detroit Institute of Arts. The building has been redeveloped into condominiums, and is now known as the Park Shelton Apartments.
117	Warren-Prentis Historic District	Warren-Prentis Historic District	December 1, 1997 (#97001477)	Bounded by Woodward, Warren, 3rd, and the alley south of Prentis; 42°21′15″N 83°04′04″W	Midtown: North Cass	This district contains a mix of building styles. Upper-class Detroit citizens built single-family homes in the area in 1880–1895. During the same time, apartment living became more popular, and duplexes and small apartment buildings were constructed in the 1890s through the first part of the 20th century. Commercial development was added to the mix in the years after World War I.
118	Washington Boulevard Historic District	Washington Boulevard Historic District	July 15, 1982 (#82002914)	Washington Boulevard, between State and Clifford Sts. 42°19′59″N 83°03′04″W	Downtown	This district includes the Book Cadillac Hotel, the Book Tower, the Industrial Building, and Washington Square among other architecturally significant buildings. The Detroit Statler Hotel was located on the boulevard until it was demolished in 2005. The street was broadened and ornamented in the early part of the 20th century to resemble New York's Fifth Avenue and European boulevards.
119	Wayne County Courthouse	Wayne County Courthouse	February 24, 1975 (#75000972)	600 Randolph St. 42°19′56″N 83°02′34″W	Downtown	The Wayne County Building contained the Wayne County administrative offices, and its courthouse. The exterior architectural sculpture, including the Anthony Wayne pediment, was executed by Detroit sculptor Edward Wagner. The building may be one of the nation's finest surviving examples of Roman Baroque architecture, with a blend of Beaux-Arts and some elements of the Neoclassical style.
120	Wayne State University Buildings	Wayne State University Buildings	June 23, 1978 (#78001524)	4735-4841 Cass Ave. 42°21′16″N 83°04′02″W	Midtown: North Cass	This district includes three buildings: a Queen Anne style home (now the Mackenzie House), the First Church of Christ Scientist (now the Hilberry Theater), and Central High School (now Old Main).
121	Weil and Company – Gabriel Richard Building	Weil and Company – Gabriel Richard Building	January 31, 2017 (#100000604)	305 Michigan Ave. 42°19′53″N 83°03′06″W	Downtown	This building was constructed in 1914 for Weil and Company, a furniture retailer. In 1948, the building was obtained by the Roman Catholic Archdiocese of Detroit, who renamed it the Gabriel Richard Building. The Archdiocese used it until 2015.
122	West Canfield Historic District	West Canfield Historic District	May 27, 1971 (#71000433)	Canfield Ave. between 2nd and 3rd Sts.; also 3rd Ave. between Canfield and Calumet; 42°21′03″N 83°04′04″W	Midtown: North Cass	The West Canfield Historic district is located on a primarily residential block of Canfield. Homes in the district are examples of Queen Anne architecture that have remained nearly unchanged since the late 19th century. A 1997 boundary increase added to the district three buildings on Third Avenue between Canfield and Calumet.
123	David Whitney House	David Whitney House	August 21, 1972 (#72000671)	4421 Woodward Ave. 42°21′10″N 83°03′44″W	Midtown: North Cass	The David Whitney House was built between 1890 and 1894 for lumber baron David Whitney Jr., one of Michigan's wealthiest citizens. The home was described in one contemporaneous newspaper account as "the most elaborate and substantial residence in this part of the country". The house is 21,000-square-foot (2,000 m^{2}) and has 52 rooms (including 10 bathrooms), 218 windows, and 20 fireplaces. It currently operates as a restaurant, The Whitney.
124	Willis-Selden Historic District	Willis-Selden Historic District	December 1, 1997 (#97001478)	Bounded by the alley north of W. Willis, Woodward, the alley south of Selden, and 3rd Ave. 42°20′57″N 83°03′52″W	Midtown: North Cass	The Willis-Selden Historic District includes a large number of commercial buildings and high-density apartment buildings built in the early 20th century to service Detroit's booming auto economy.
125	Wilson Theatre	Wilson Theatre	August 9, 1977 (#77000725)	350 Madison St. 42°20′14″N 83°02′46″W	Downtown	The Wilson Theatre was built in 1928 by Matilda Dodge Wilson, the widow of John Francis Dodge, as a venue for live theatre. The facade is an impressive Art Deco mix of colored brick and terracotta. It is now known as the Music Hall Center for the Performing Arts.
126	Women's City Club	Women's City Club	November 20, 1979 (#79001179)	2110 Park Ave. 42°20′14″N 83°03′10″W	Downtown	The Women's City Club is a six-story modern building, built in the 1920s for use by women's social clubs and with apartments for unmarried women. Architect William B. Stratton (husband of ceramicist Mary Chase Perry Stratton) used extensive Pewabic Pottery tilework on the interior.
127	Woodward East Historic District	Woodward East Historic District	January 21, 1975 (#75000973)	Bounded by Alfred, Edmund, Watson, and Brush and John R. Sts. 42°20′43″N 83°03′09″W	Midtown: Brush Park	The Woodward East Historic District, located within the locally designated Brush Park Historic District, is particularly known for the High Victorian–style residences constructed for Detroit's wealthiest citizens. Although many of the once-grand houses have been demolished in recent years, those remaining exhibit a variety of Victorian style subtypes and architectural details.

== Listings formerly located in Downtown/Midtown Detroit ==
The following listings were located in Downtown/Midtown Detroit at the time they were placed on the Register, but have since moved to another location.

	Name on the Register	Image	Date listed	Current Location	Location when Listed	Description
1	Columbia (Steamer)	Columbia (Steamer)	November 2, 1979 (#79001171)	Marine A Grain Elevator, Buffalo River at Silo City Row, Buffalo, New York; 42°51′39″N 78°51′44″W	661 Civic Center Dr. 42°19'28"N 83°03'02"W	This passenger steamship carried passengers to Bois Blanc Island (Boblo) for the Detroit & Windsor Ferry Company, and is one of the last remaining examples of her kind. Designed by Frank E. Kirby, noted naval architect. The Columbia and her sister ship, the Ste. Claire were docking at downtown Detroit in 1979 when they were listed in the National Register. They are the last two remaining turn-of-the-century excursion steamships in existence. They were docked at downtown Detroit in 1979 when they were listed in the National Register. After Boblo service ended in 1991 they were relocated to the Nicholson Terminal and Dock Company, 360 E Great Lakes St, Ecorse, Wayne County, Michigan, where they became National Historic Landmarks in 1992. In September 2014 the Columbia was relocated to Toledo, Ohio, for repairs, then in August 2015 was moved to Buffalo, New York, where it is being prepared for an eventual move to the Hudson River.
2	Ste. Claire (Steamer)	Ste. Claire (Steamer)	November 2, 1979 (#79001177)	11000 Freud St, on Detroit River near foot of St Jean St (Jefferson Corridor); 42°21′18″N 82°57′55″W	661 Civic Center Dr. 42°19'27"N 83°03'06"W	Designed by naval architect Frank E. Kirby. Between 1910 and 1991, the Ste. Claire ferried passengers to Bois Blanc Island (Boblo) for the Detroit & Windsor Ferry Company. The Ste. Claire and her sister ship, the SS Columbia were docking at downtown Detroit in 1979 when they were listed in the National Register. After Boblo service ended in 1991 they were relocated to the Nicholson Terminal and Dock Company, 360 E Great Lakes St, Ecorse, Wayne County, Michigan, where they became National Historic Landmarks in 1992. The Ste. Claire was moved to Toledo, Ohio in 2003, but returned to Ecorse a few years later. In 2016 she was docked in the Rouge River in Detroit, then moved to the Riverside Marina on the Detroit River. There on July 6, 2018, a devastating fire caused severe damage during repairs, but the owner intends to continue the work.

== Former listings ==
	Name on the Register	Image	Date listed	Date removed	Location	Description
1	Lewis Cass Technical High School	Lewis Cass Technical High School	March 29, 2011 (#10000644)	December 2, 2024	2421 Second Ave. 42°20′15″N 83°03′36″W	Cass Tech was built in 1922 with Malcomson and Higginbotham working as the design architects and Albert Kahn's firm as construction architects. The school was Detroit's first technical high school and for years the only magnet school in the city. The building was in use until 2005, when a new Cass Tech High School was built. The school was submitted to the NRHP as part of the Public Schools of Detroit MPS. The building was demolished in July 2011.
2	Harper Hospital	Harper Hospital	September 30, 1976 (#76001038)	January 11, 1978	3800 John R St. 42°21′02″N 83°03′25″W	The Harper Hospital was designed by Elijah E. Myers and built in 1883. It was demolished in the 1970s.
3	Park Avenue Hotel	Park Avenue Hotel	July 12, 2006 (#06000586)	December 2, 2024	2643 Park Ave. 42°20′28″N 83°03′24″W	The Park Avenue was one of three hotels located on Park Avenue and designed by Louis Kamper for Lew Tuller; the other two are the Eddystone at 100 Sproat Street (across Sproat from the Park Avenue site), and the Royal Palm at 2305 Park Avenue. The building was demolished in July 2015.
4	Santa Fe Apartments	Santa Fe Apartments	May 1, 1986 (#86000996)	2022-10-17	681 Merrick St. 42°21′24″N 83°04′19″W	This building was a fine example of Mission and Spanish Revival, rare for Detroit. It has been demolished by Wayne State University; the site is now the location of the Yousif B. Ghafari Hall.
5	Woodward Avenue Baptist Church	Woodward Avenue Baptist Church	August 3, 1982 (#82002915)	April 18, 1988	2464 Woodward Avenue; 42°20′26″N 83°03′11″W	The Woodward Avenue Baptist Church was built in 1886-87 for the former Lafayette Street Baptist Church congregation at a cost of $133,000. The church was designed by Mortimer L. Smith with a later addition by George D. Mason. As congregants left Detroit in the later 20th century, church attendance dwindled and it closed in 1979. The building was sold in 1980 to the United House of Jeremiah, but that group soon abandoned the church. The church burned in 1986, and the remnants were demolished.

== See also ==
- National Register of Historic Places listings in Detroit
- National Register of Historic Places listings in Wayne County, Michigan
- National Register of Historic Places listings in Michigan
- List of Michigan State Historic Sites in Wayne County, Michigan
