= MeritHall Inc =

American staffing agency business

- Company type: Private
- Industry: Professional services
- Founded: 2011
- Founders: Paul Kaser
- Headquarters: Detroit, Michigan, United States
- Services: Human resources consulting, recruitment
- Website: www.merithall.com

MeritHall Inc is a staffing agency headquartered in Detroit, Michigan. They provide staffing services and the brokerage of bulk road salt for clients in the industries of landscaping, snow removal, construction and facility maintenance.

== History ==
MeritHall Inc was originally envisioned as a technology company, centered around an online marketplace for construction contractors to find employees. The company was restructured with less of a focus on technology and in 2013 it began taking on landscaping and snow removal clients. The company is headquartered in the historic Harmonie Centre building in downtown Detroit. On July 22, 2014 Senator Carl Levin referenced MeritHall Inc in a speech before Congress to argue for the efficacy of the Intermediary Lending Program, which facilitates loans for small businesses.
