= Sugar Hill Historic District =

Sugar Hill Historic District may refer to:

- Sugar Hill Historic District (Detroit)
- Sugar Hill Historic District (New York City)
