= Cary Building =

Cary Building may refer to:

- Cary Building (Detroit)
- Cary Building (New York City)
