= Broadway Avenue Historic District (Detroit) =

Historic district in Michigan, United States

- U.S. National Register of Historic Places
- U.S. Historic district
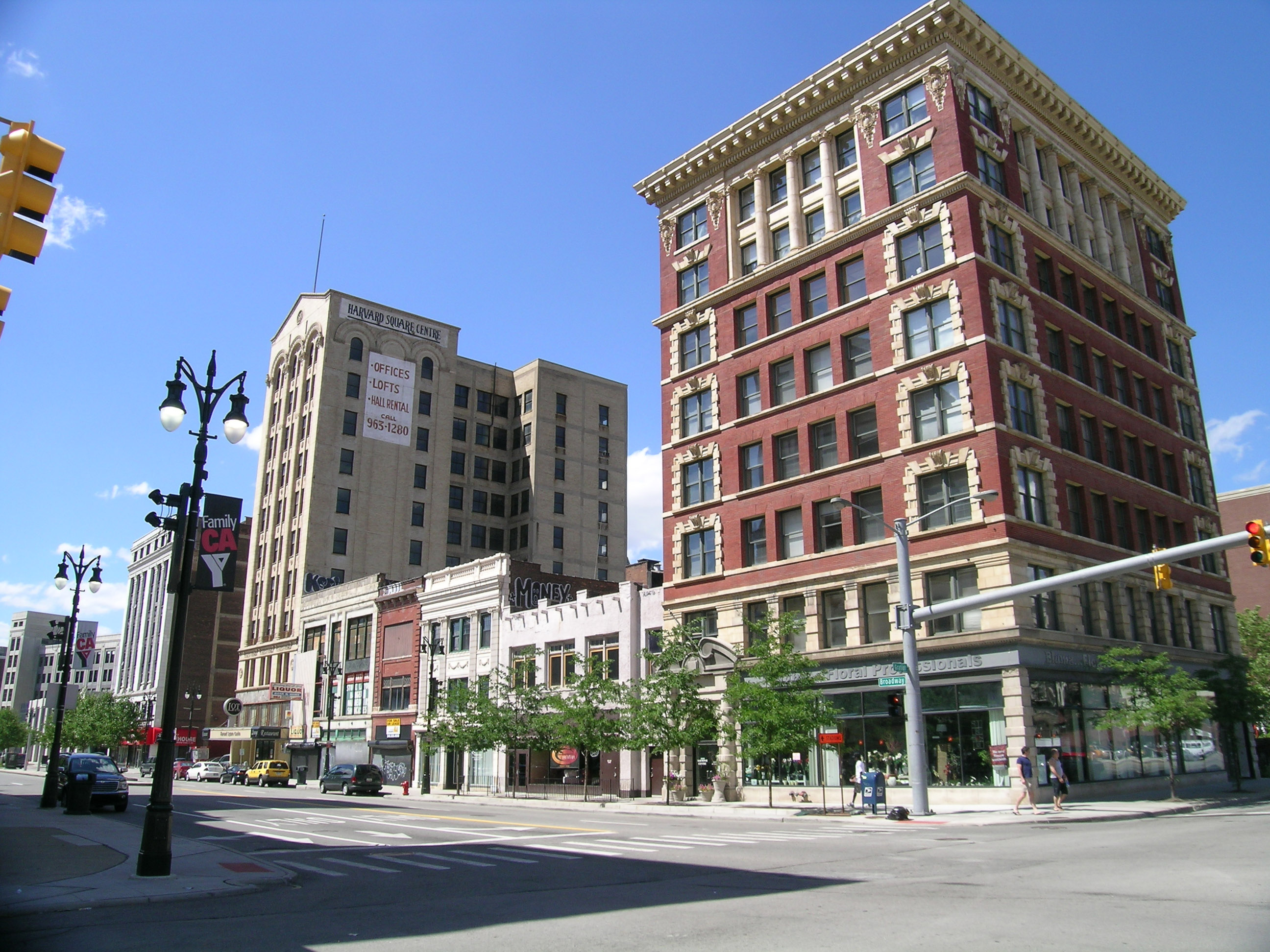
- East side of Broadway
- Interactive map
- Location: Detroit, Michigan, U.S.
- Coordinates: 42°20′6″N 83°2′46″W
- Built: 1896
- Architect: Joseph E. Mills, et al.
- Architectural style: Early Commercial; Beaux-Arts
- NRHP reference No.: 04000656
- Added to NRHP: July 1, 2004

The Broadway Avenue Historic District is a historic district located on a single city block along Broadway Avenue between Gratiot and East Grand River in downtown Detroit, Michigan. It was listed on the National Register of Historic Places in 2004. The Broadway Avenue Historic District joins the Randolph Street Commercial Buildings Historic District, a rare surviving commercial area which dates from the 1840s.

== Description and significance ==
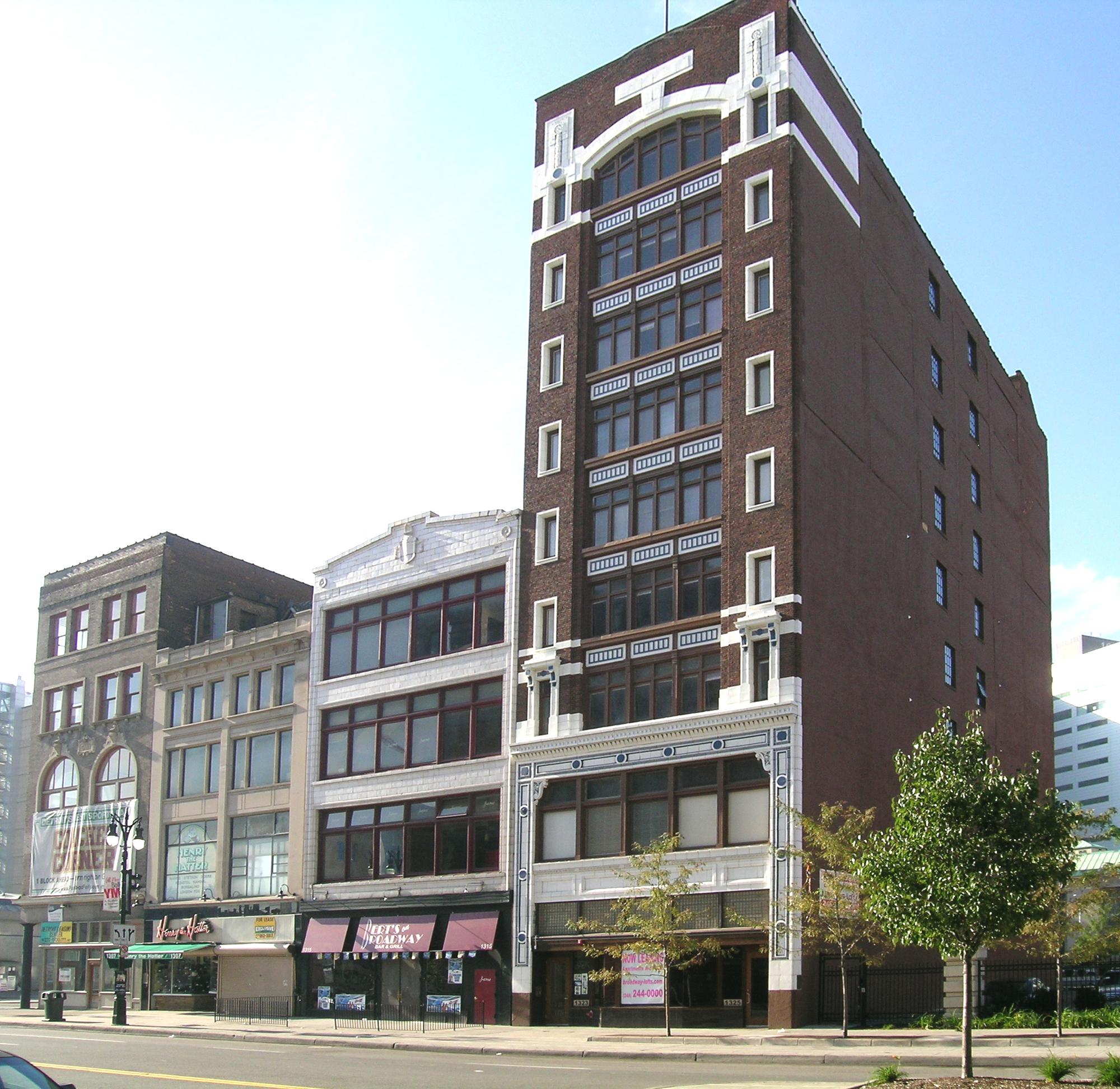
West side of Broadway

The Broadway Avenue Historic District contains eleven commercial buildings built between 1896 and 1926. Three of those buildings — the Cary Building and the Breitmeyer–Tobin Building at the southern end, and the Merchants Building at the north end — are listed on the National Register of Historic Places in their own right.

The architectural terra cotta used on these structures unifies the appearance of the district. The district is significant for its architecture, its commercial history, its ethnic heritage, and for its association with Philip Breitmeyer, mayor of Detroit from 1909 to 1911.

== History ==
The area where the district is located was developed in the late 1800s as a commercial area catering to the women's trade, and included businesses such as hairdressers, florists, corset makers, and fashionable clothiers. A number of these women's trade shops were owned by ethnic immigrants. During the 1910s, the area began transforming into a banking and financial center. In the adjoining Randolph Street Commercial Buildings Historic District, the building at 1244 Randolph St. is a rare survivor from the 1840s. The Breitmeyer-Tobin Building on Broadway Avenue, now called Harmonie Centre, opened to African-American tenants in 1936. In the 1950s, ethnic and immigrant-owned shops moved into the area, with some of them still in the districts to the present day. The east necklace of downtown links Grand Circus and the stadium area to Greektown along Broadway. The east necklace contains a sub-district sometimes called the Harmonie Park District in the Broadway Avenue Historic District which has taken on the legacy of Detroit's music from the 1930s through the 1950s and into the present.

== See also ==
- Harvard Square Centre
- Harmonie Club
- Music of Detroit
