= Garden Court Condominiums =

- Garden Court Apartments
- U.S. National Register of Historic Places
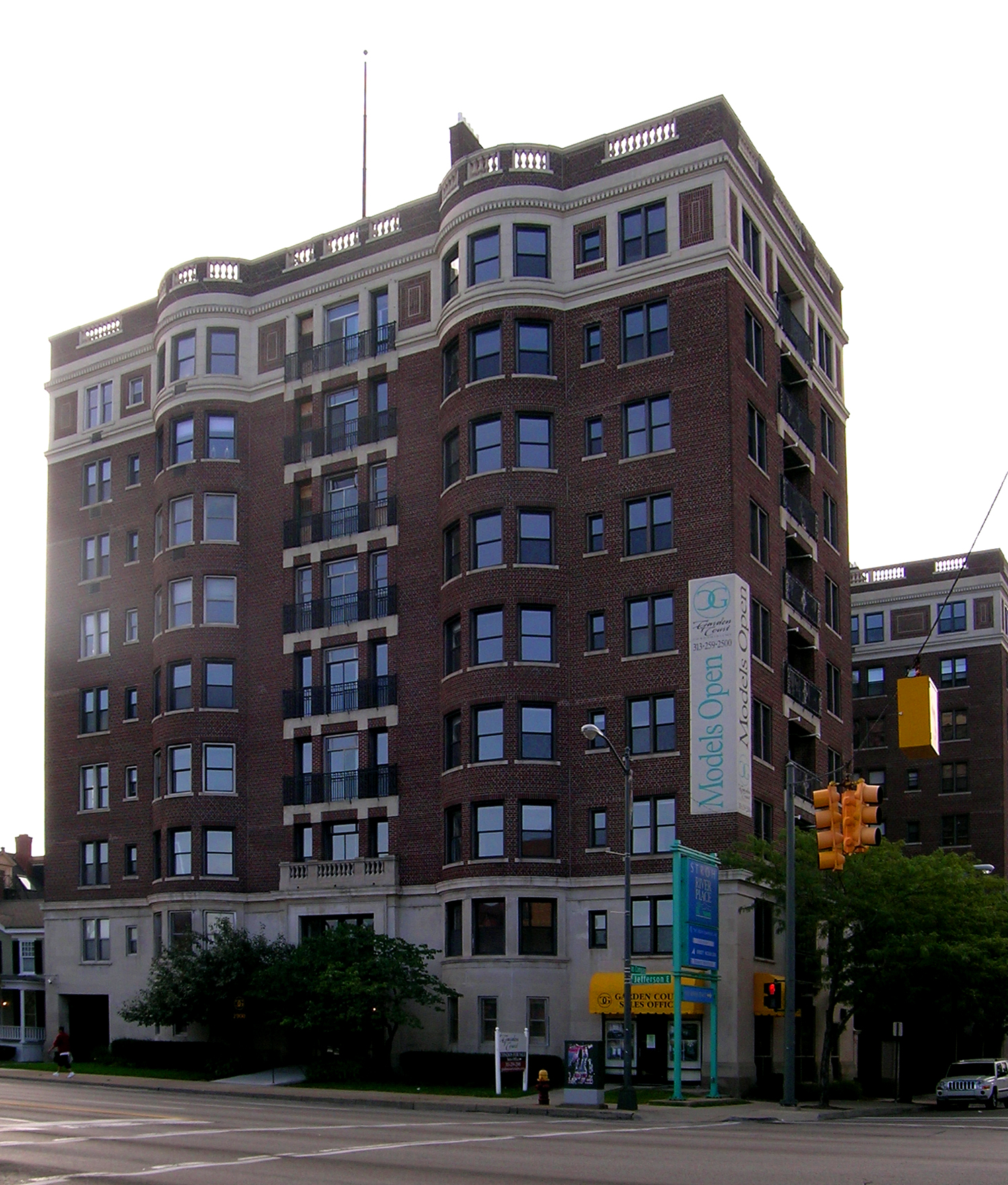
- Interactive map
- Location: 2900 E. Jefferson Ave., Detroit, Michigan
- Coordinates: 42°20′22″N 83°1′9″W
- Built: 1915
- Architect: Albert Kahn
- MPS: East Jefferson Avenue Residential TR
- NRHP reference No.: 85002937
- Added to NRHP: October 9, 1985

Garden Court Condominiums (originally Garden Court Apartments) is a condominium building located at 2900 East Jefferson Avenue in Detroit, Michigan. It was listed on the National Register of Historic Places in 1985.

== Description ==
The Garden Court Apartments is an H-shaped building standing nine stories tall with a symmetrical façade facing Jefferson Avenue. The lowest two stories are faced with limestone, while the remainder of the building is made from red brick. Two rounded bay window units rise the full nine stories. The top story has limestone belt courses and window surrounds, and a balustrade runs along the edge of the flat roof.

== History ==
The Garden Court Apartments were constructed for J. Harrington Walker (of Hiram Walker & Sons) in 1915. Walker lived across the street from the Garden Court; when the building was completed, he moved into the top floor of the south tower (now units C8, D800, and D801).

The building originally housed 32 very large luxury apartments. In 2008, the Garden Court Apartments have been converted to a condominium, with 65 one- two- and three-bedroom units.

The building was featured in the television show Martin.
