= Great Lakes Manor =

- U.S. National Register of Historic Places
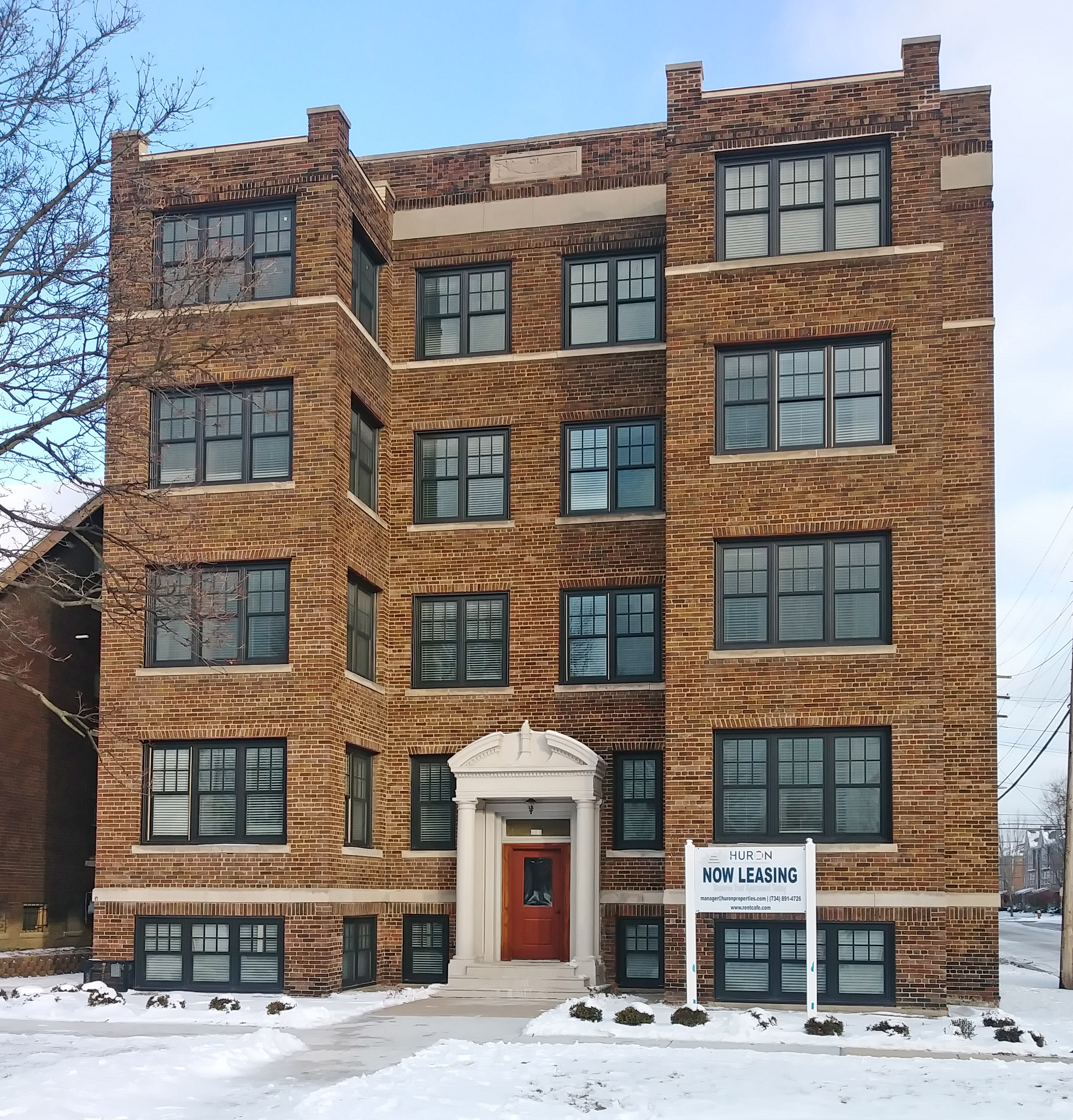
- Great Lakes Manor, 2020
- Interactive map
- Location: 457 East Kirby St. Detroit, Michigan
- Coordinates: 42°21′45″N 83°3′40″W
- Built: 1925
- Built by: Pelavin Brothers
- Architectural style: Classical Revival
- NRHP reference No.: 100005085
- Added to NRHP: March 16, 2020

Great Lakes Manor, also known as Kirby Manor Apartments, is an apartment building located at 457 East Kirby Street in Detroit, Michigan. It was listed on the National Register of Historic Places in 2020.

== History ==
In 1925, a permit was issued to Pelavin Brothers to construct what was then known as the Kirby Manor Apartments. The area of the city where the apartment building stood was at the time a primarily Jewish neighborhood. The Pelavin Brothers themselves were part of the local Jewish community, as were many of the original tenants in the building. These tenants were primarily middle class workers, such as salespeople, small business owners, bookkeepers, and teachers.

At about the same time, the surrounding neighborhood was transitioning from a Jewish community to one that was majority African-American. Although the majority of building residents in 1930 were Jewish, by 1940 the majority were African-American. In 1936, the building was purchased by the Great Lakes Land and Investment Company, a subsidiary of the Great Lakes Mutual Insurance Company. Great Lakes Mutual was one of the largest African-American businesses in the state of Michigan. In 1937, the company renamed the building the Great Lakes Manor. The apartment building, and its ownership, was part of an important step toward civil rights in the city of Detroit, as it provided accessible housing to the growing African American middle class.

In about 1942, Charles H. Mahoney, the president of Great Lakes Mutual, moved into Great Lakes Manor. He lived there into the early 1960s. In 1969, Great Lakes Mutual Insurance merged with the North Carolina Mutual Insurance Company, and in 1970 sold the Great Lakes Manor. However, the building gradually deteriorated and by 1989 was vacant. In that year, the city sponsored a rehabilitation project, which completely redid the interior and reduced the number of units from 42 to 30. In 2019–2020, the building was completely renovated. As of 2020, the building is being managed by Huron Real Estate Management

== Description ==
Great Lakes Manor is a four-and-a-half-story Classical Revival style apartment building clad with multi-color brownish-red brick. It has a flat roof and a raised basement. The front facade has a recessed center section flanked by projecting rectangular bays. The recessed center section contains a stone entry portico with Doric columns, approached by three steps.

At the level of the basement window lintels, a soldier course of bricks topped with a limestone band runs across the entire facade. Another limestone band runs across the wall at the level of the fourth-floor windowsill. Above the fourth-floor window lintels is a projecting header course. Above the basement, all of the window openings have limestone sills and soldier course lintels. At the very top of the building is a parapet, just below which runs a brick soldier course and a masonry band. A carved stone panel in the parapet wall tops the center of the facade.

On the interior, the entry opens into a small vestibule with a stairway. The stairway leads to corridors on each floor, which run the length of the building with apartments on both sides and stairs at each end of the corridor. The apartments contain are all one or two bedroom units.
