= Hudson–Evans House =

Historic house in Michigan, United States

- U.S. National Register of Historic Places
- Michigan State Historic Site
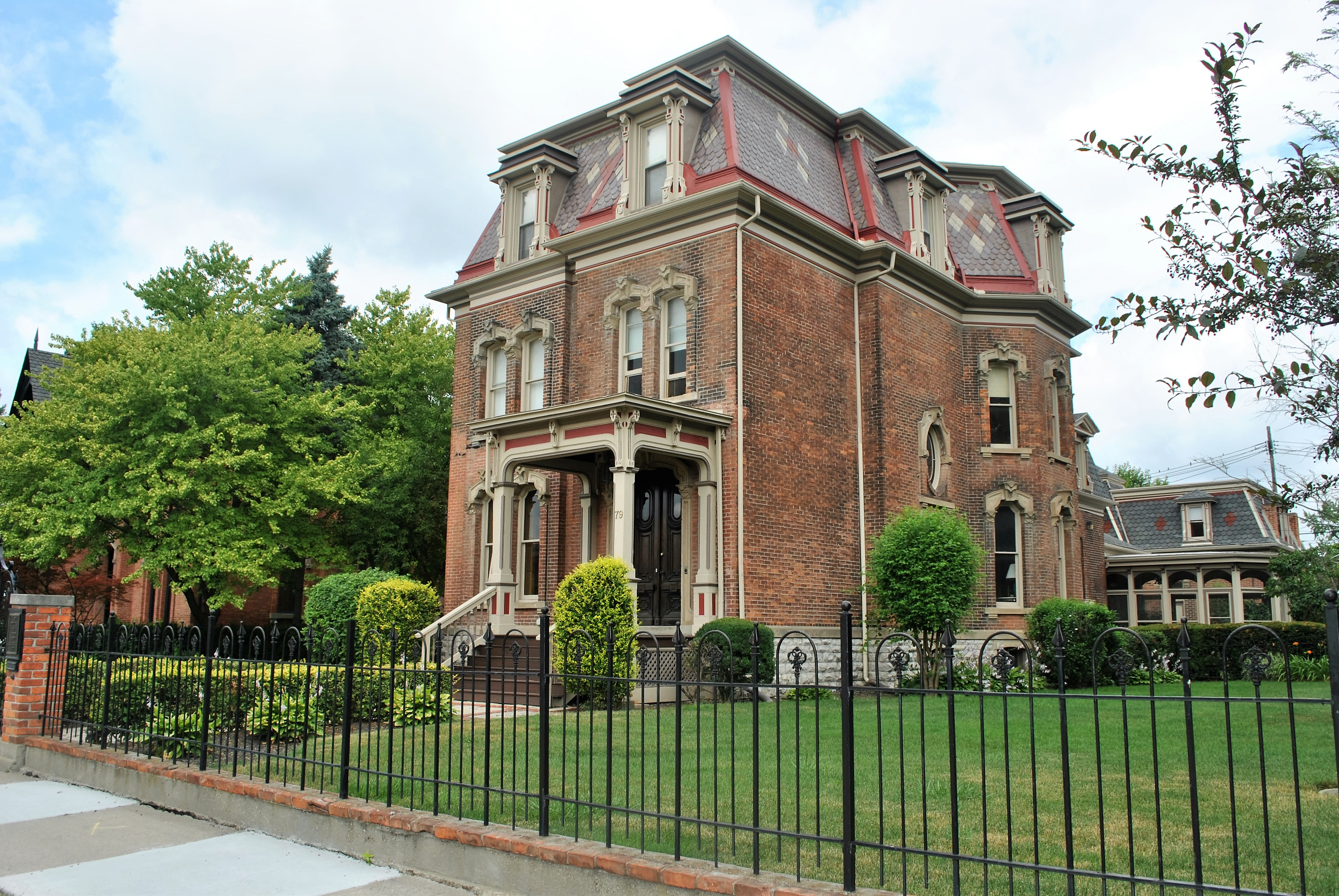

- Location within Michigan Location within the United States
- Interactive map
- Location: 79 Alfred Street, Detroit, Michigan
- Coordinates: 42°20′37″N 83°3′13″W
- Built: 1872
- Architectural style: Second Empire, Italianate
- NRHP reference No.: 75000966

Significant dates
- Added to NRHP: March 5, 1975
- Designated MSHS: November 15, 1973

The Hudson–Evans House (also known as the Joseph Lothian Hudson House or the Grace Whitney Evans House) is the private, single-family house located at 79 Alfred Street in Midtown Detroit, Michigan, within the Brush Park district.

== History ==
The Hudson–Evans House was built near 1872–73 for Philo Wright, a Detroit-based ship owner. In 1882, the house was given as a wedding present to Grace Whitney Evans, daughter of the lumber baron David Whitney Jr. (builder of the David Whitney House). Grace Evans was active in numerous charitable activities, and later became the first president of the Detroit YWCA. Between 1894 and 1904 Mrs. Evans rented the house to Joseph Lowthian Hudson, founder of Detroit's J.L. Hudson Company department store.

The house was designated a Michigan State Historic Site in 1973 and listed on the National Register of Historic Places in 1975.

The structure is now used for the law offices of VanOverbeke, Michaud, & Timmony, P. C.

== Description ==
The Hudson–Evans House is a three-story house built of red brick on a rough-cut stone foundation, designed in a French Second Empire architectural style with Italianate influences. The floor-plan is basically rectangular, but the elaborate two-story bay windows that grace both sides of the house minimize the severity of the design. Arched moldings top the windows in the home, and the mansard roof includes colored slate laid in a decorative pattern. The porch on the home was apparently added after the original construction.
