= Cary Building (Detroit) =

- U.S. National Register of Historic Places
- U.S. Historic district – Contributing property
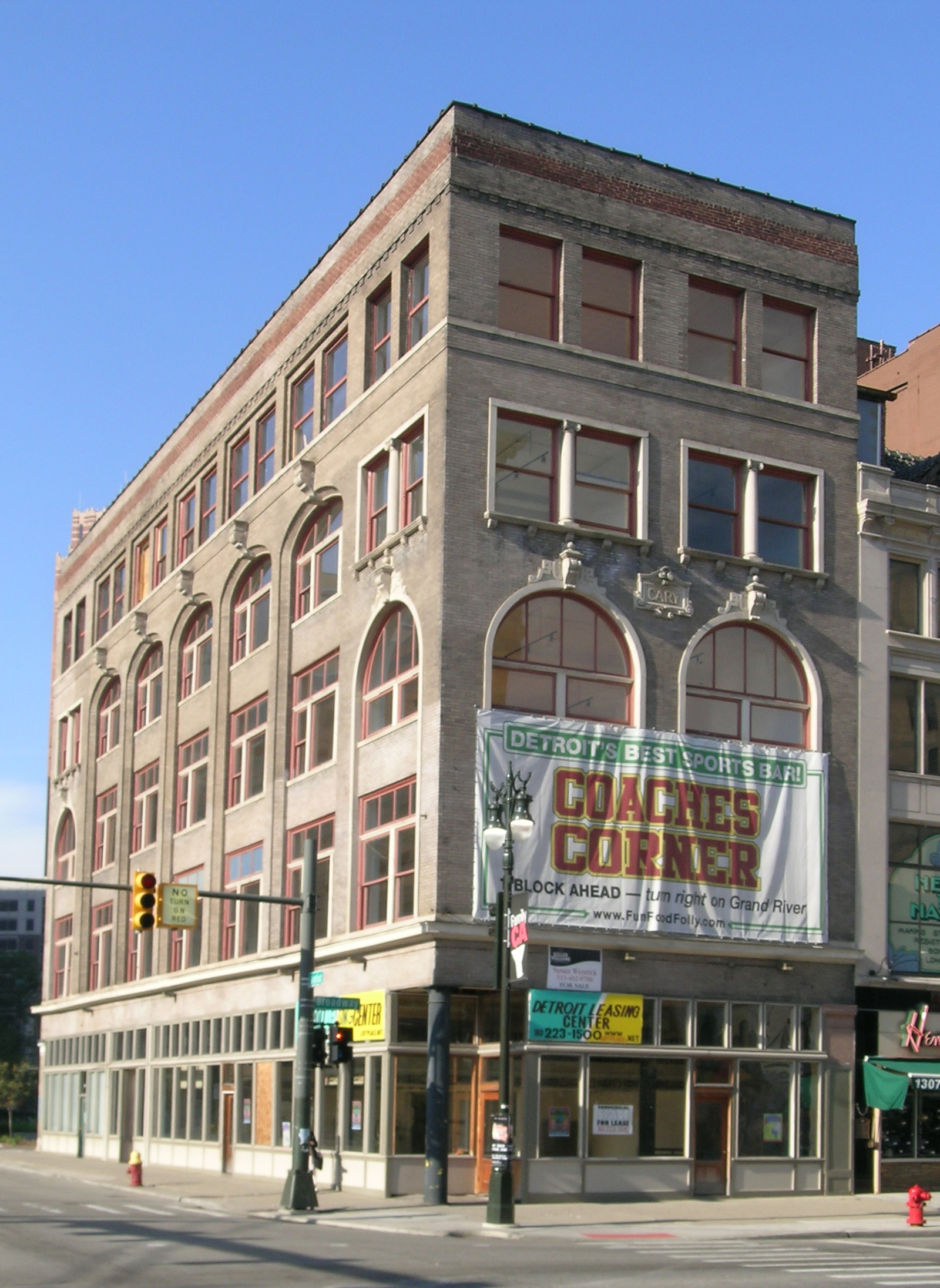
- Cary Building from the east
- Interactive map
- Location: 229 Gratiot Avenue; Detroit, Michigan, U.S.
- Coordinates: 42°20′8″N 83°2′49″W
- Built: 1906
- Architect: Richard E. Raseman
- Architectural style: Beaux-Arts
- Part of: Broadway Avenue Historic District (ID04000656)
- NRHP reference No.: 83003670
- Added to NRHP: November 25, 1983

The Cary Building is a commercial building located at 229 Gratiot Avenue (at the corner of Gratiot and Broadway) in Downtown Detroit. It was listed on the National Register of Historic Places in 1983.

== History ==
The Cary Building was built by Frank M. Cary, a speculator in Detroit real estate. Cary hired architect Richard E. Raseman (who also designed the Breitmeyer–Tobin Building, located across Broadway from the Cary, in 1905) to design the structure. The construction of the Cary Building began a transformation of Broadway (then called Miami Avenue) from an upper-class residential area into a fashionable commercial district.

As of 2013, the entire structure is in need of restoration. However, as of 2016, the building is owned by Rock Ventures and has seen some restoration work.

== Description ==
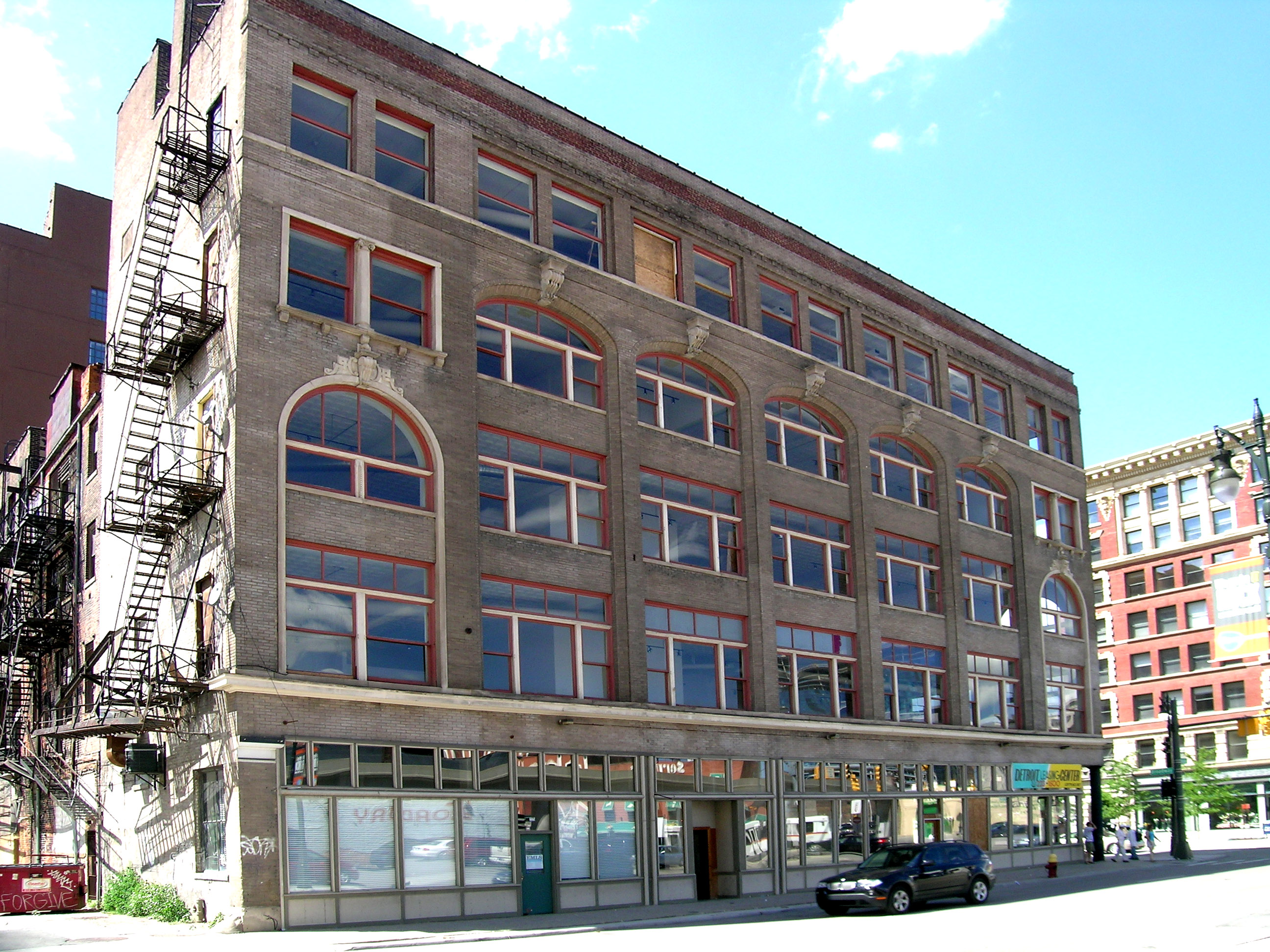
Cary Building, Gratiot façade

The five-story building, designed in the Beaux-Arts architectural style and faced with brick, is significant because of its strong use of vertical bays with capping arches. The building is rectangular in plan, measuring 112 feet along Gratiot and 34 feet along Broadway. The street-level storefronts are topped with a stone beltcourse. The middle three floors along the Gratiot facade consist of five, three-story masonry arches with segmental heads. The arches contain recessed Chicago style windows on each floor. The outer bays have two-story round-headed arches trimmed in stone containing recessed double-hung windows, and a pair of double-hung windows above the arch on the fourth floor. The design of the end bays is repeated twice on the Broadway facade. The fifth floor is separated from the fourth by a stone beltcourse, and contains pairs of double-hung windows above each bay.

The original cornice of the building has been removed. The interior of the structure contains office space with no significant features.
