= Elisha Taylor House =

Historic house in Michigan, United States

- U.S. National Register of Historic Places
- U.S. Historic district – Contributing property
- Michigan State Historic Site
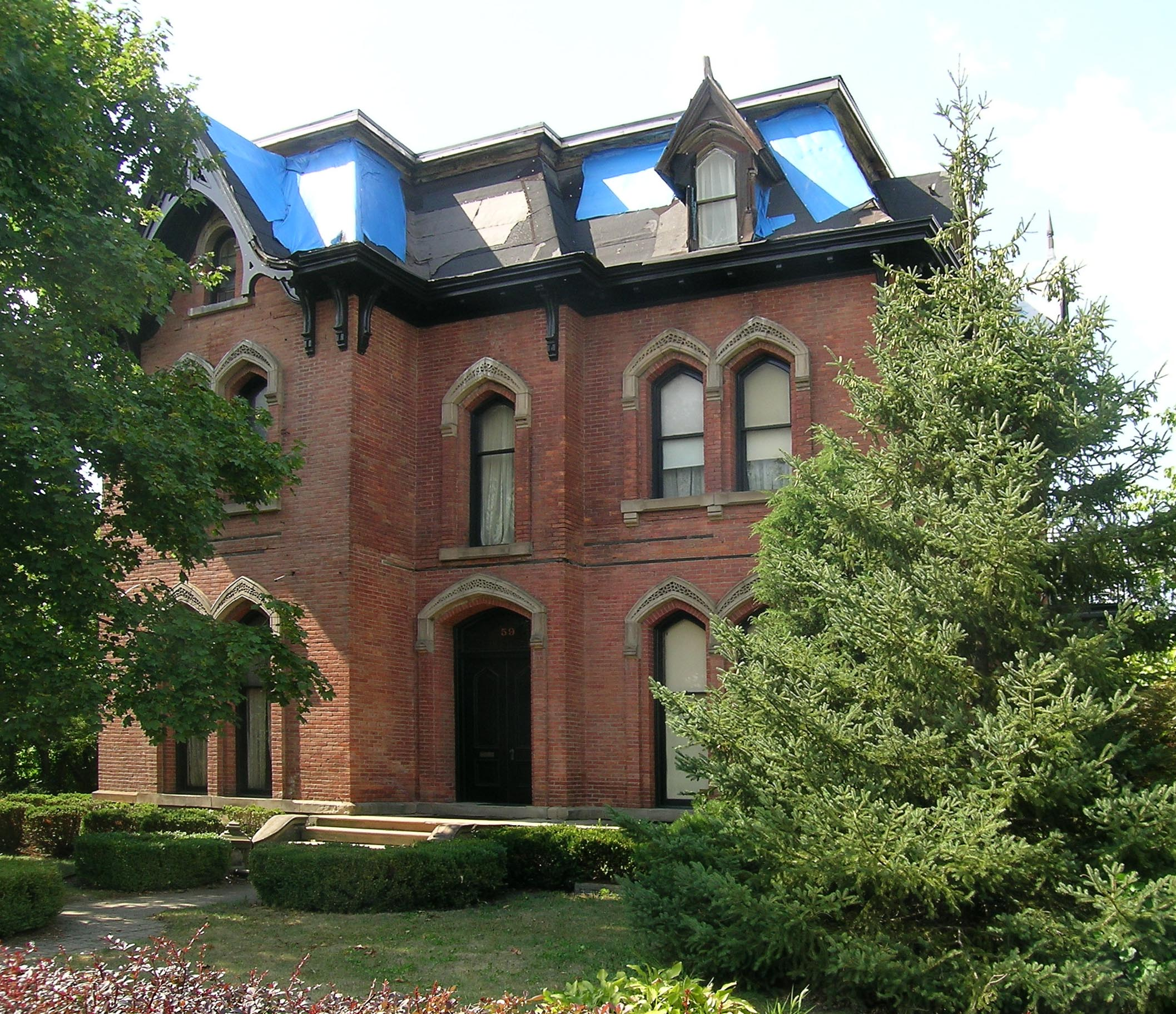

- Location within Michigan Location within the United States
- Interactive map showing the location of Elisha Taylor House
- Location: 59 Alfred St., Detroit, Michigan
- Coordinates: 42°20′36″N 83°3′16″W
- Built: 1871
- Architect: Koch & Hess
- Architectural style: French Renaissance Revival, Second Empire, Victorian, Gothic Revival
- NRHP reference No.: 75000971

Significant dates
- Added to NRHP: March 05, 1975
- Designated MSHS: November 15, 1973

The Elisha Taylor House is a historic private house located at 59 Alfred Street in Midtown Detroit, Michigan, within the Brush Park district. The house was designated a Michigan State Historic Site in 1973 and listed on the National Register of Historic Places in 1975. Since 1981, it has served as a center for art and architectural study, known as the Art House.

== History ==
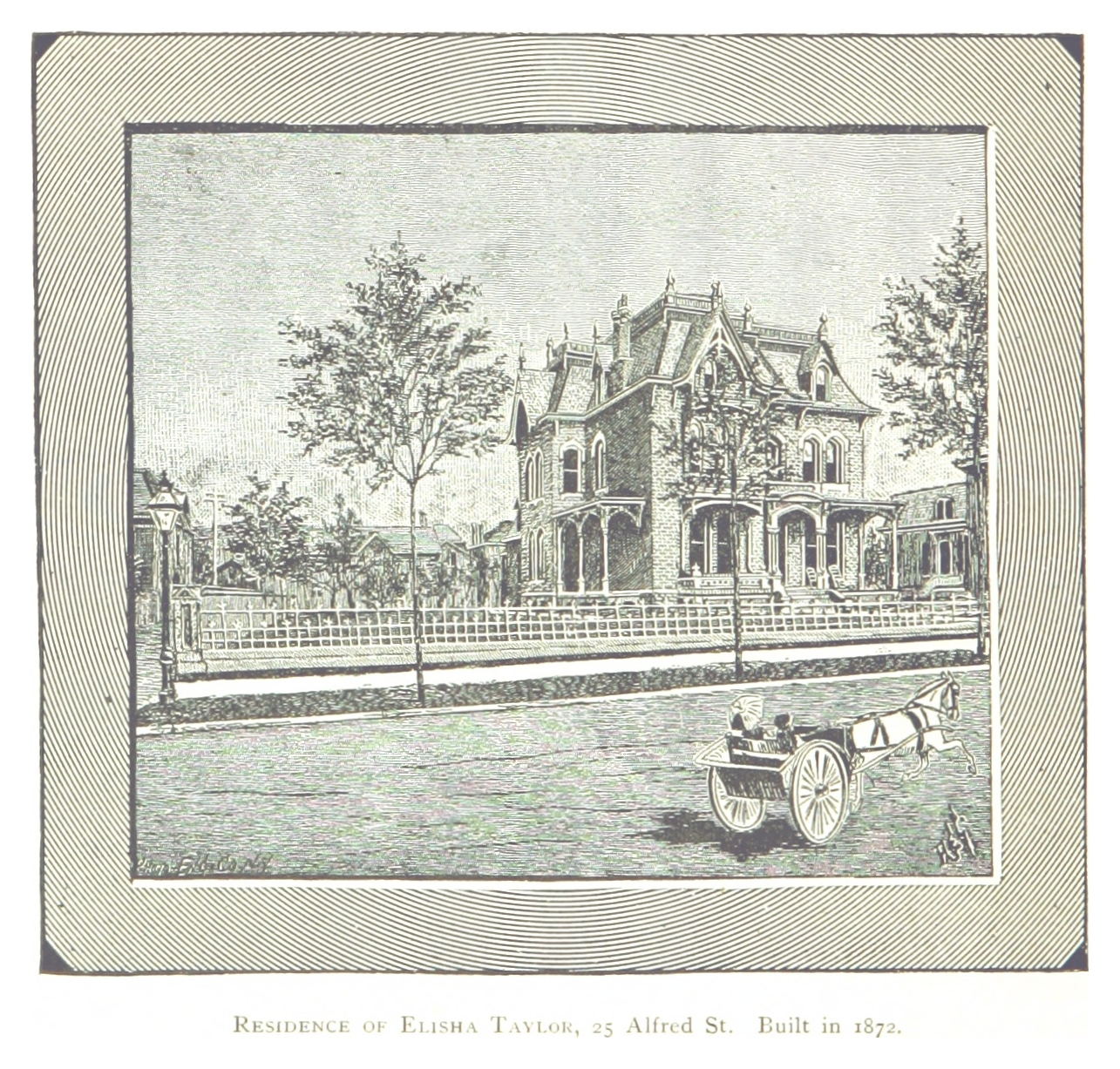
The Elisha Taylor House in an 1884 drawing by Silas Farmer

The Elisha Taylor House was built in 1871 for William H. Craig, a local lawyer, land speculator, and president of the Detroit Board of Trade. The architects were Koch & Hess of Milwaukee and Detroit. In 1875, Craig sold the house to attorney Elisha Taylor. Taylor was a Detroit attorney who held many offices during his career, including City Attorney, assistant Michigan Attorney General from 1837 to 1841, and Circuit Court Commissioner from 1846 to 1854.

== Description ==
The Elisha Taylor House is two-and-a-half stories tall, made of red brick on a rough stone foundation. The structure is an eclectic mix of Gothic and Tudor Revival with elements of other styles, including Queen Anne and Italianate. The house has a high mansard roof with large protruding dormers and unusual vergeboarding at the peak. It is one of the best examples surviving in Detroit of post-Civil War residential design.

== Current use ==
Since 1981, the structure has been used as a center for art and architectural study. The interior has been well preserved, boasting original fireplaces, mirrors, woodwork, decorative plaster, stenciling, Mintons floor tiles, parquet floors, and etched glass.
