= Sugar Hill Historic District (Detroit) =

Historic district in Michigan, United States

- U.S. National Register of Historic Places
- U.S. Historic district
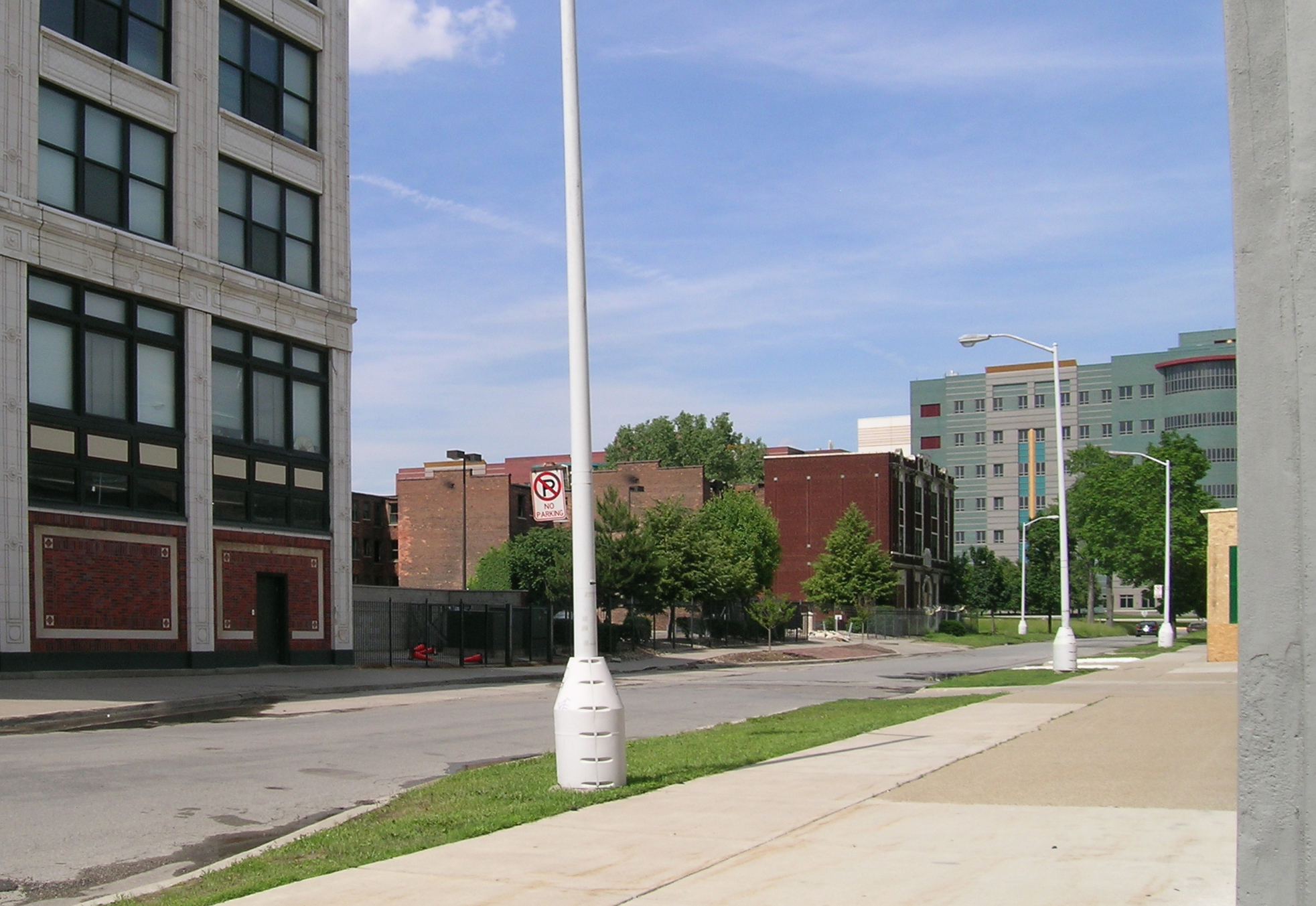
- Garfield Street, looking east from Woodward. The building to the left is the Garfield Building; the John Dingell Detroit Veterans' Administration Hospital is in the background, and the Garfield Manor Apartments in the center.
- Interactive map
- Location: Detroit, Michigan, U.S.
- Coordinates: 42°21′16″N 83°3′40″W
- Built: 1946
- Architect: T.W. Cooper
- Architectural style: Beaux Arts, Early Commercial
- NRHP reference No.: 03000068
- Added to NRHP: March 3, 2003

The Sugar Hill Historic District is a historic district in Detroit, Michigan. It contains 14 structures located along three streets: East Forest, Garfield, and East Canfield, between Woodward Avenue on the west and John R. on the east. The district was listed on the National Register of Historic Places in 2003.

== History ==
The area where this district is now located was originally settled by Detroit's wealthier citizens in the 1880s, seeking suburban homes near Woodward Avenue and well out of downtown. Early residents included Detroit Edison Company president Alex Dow; Herman Kiefer Hospital founder Dr. Guy L. Kiefer, and Detroit College of Medicine professor Dr. Nathaniel Webber. Around 1900, the area was a major center for Jewish Detroiters, as well as medical staff working at the hospitals nearby. The neighborhood remained substantially Jewish through the 1930s. As population pressure increased, however, apartments were constructed and what once were large single family homes were subdivided. In 1936, the first nightclub in what is now the Sugar Hill District opened, the Harlem Cave.

Meanwhile, Detroit's first African American residents settled in Black Bottom and Paradise Valley. As the black population grew into the 1930s, the Paradise Valley area expanded up Hastings Street to Warren Avenue, and developed onto the parallel streets of St. Antoine, Beaubien, and Brush. Rebuilding caused many residents living near downtown to move northward. However, the areas where black residents could move were limited due to enforced housing restrictions and covenants, and the areas on John R and westward remained segregated.

In 1941, however, Ernest White purchased the Gotham Hotel at the corner of John R and Orchestra Place just south of this district. Although the purchase was apparently a case of mistaken racial identity, it set a precedent, and more African-Americans began moving and establishing businesses in the area. At the same time, more clubs opened in the Sugar Hill district, some Jewish-owned, but an increasing number owned by African-Americans. By 1950 what had been a quiet residential neighborhood became a thriving entertainment district. The area east of Woodward where the Detroit Medical Center now stands became the center of the nightlife jazz scene in Detroit. Some of the greatest musicians of the time stayed in hotels and played in clubs in the area. These included Count Basie, Billie Holiday, Muddy Waters, B. B. King, Dinah Washington, and John Lee Hooker. In addition, the entertainment world became gradually integrated as "black and tan" clubs - nightclubs open to patrons of both races - opened in the 1940s.

The Sugar Hill jazz district flourished into the 1960s, and played a major factor in the early careers of Berry Gordy, Al Green, Jackie Wilson, Marvin Gaye, and other young performers who would go on the establish the Motown sound. However, the targeted urban renewal of the 1960s decimated Paradise Valley, and the expansion of the hospitals in the Detroit Medical Center area caused the demolition of what had been the heart of the entertainment district. In particular, a number of former clubs were razed to make room for the construction of the John Dingell Detroit Veterans' Administration Hospital in the 1990s. The remaining structures in the Sugar Hill district were considered for demolition as late as the 1990s.

However, there has been recent investment in the district. In June 2010, the rehabilitation of the Garfield Manor Apartments (71 Garfield) was completed. The building is intended as artist residences and studios and includes solar power, solar water heaters, water reclamation, and geothermal heating. Plans call next for a residential and commercial building to be constructed on the corner of John R. and Garfield. The building will be dubbed the "Sugar Hill Building."

== Description ==
The Sugar Hill Historic District contains 14 structures constructed between 1885 and 1938, including single-family houses, apartment buildings, a church, and commercial buildings. The district is the largest portion remaining of a flourishing 1940s and 1950s neighborhood which had a large concentration of black-owned or operated jazz venues other commercial enterprises.

The Garfield Building (separately designated on the National Register) stands at the corner of Woodward and Garfield in the center of the district, as does the Museum of Contemporary Art Detroit. These buildings, although physically adjacent to the Sugar Hill Historic District, are not included in the district proper.

Two of the structures in the district have been demolished: the York Apartments at 74 Garfield, which was demolished after a fire in the summer of 2008, and the Randora Hotel at 92-98 Garfield, demolished in 2009.

The structures included in the district are:

=== Houses ===
- Agnes Inglis house, 102 Garfield (1891) This house was built for Agnes Inglis in 1891, and was the home of Alex Dow from 1907 to 1922. The building was used from 1922 to 1934 by the Chaffee-Noble School of Expression, a private school. In 1938, the house was subdivided and used as a rooming house. The house is a 2 1/2-story brick Queen Anne side gable structure with a two-story polygonal bay and large front gable dormer. The bay tower is accented with stone string courses, a stone band separates the double-hung sash widows from their transoms.
- Dr. N.W. Webber house, 76 E. Forest (1885) Prominent physician Nathaniel W. Webber lived in this house from 1887 to 1895. It was subdivided into apartments in the 1940s, and contained a club. The house is a 2 1/2-story brick Queen Anne structure with a prominent projecting two story bay and pyramidal roof. The entry door is wood and glass with an arched top, flanked by two long, slender double hung windows A simple porch with triangular pediment covers the entryway. Two decorated dormers are on the roof.
- McCollester house, 4635 John R. (1905) This was the home of Dr. Guy Kiefer from 1912 to 1915. It was later converted into apartments, with retail space in the basement. This retail space has been used as a barber shop from the 1950s until at least the mid-2000s. This two-story Tudor Revival structure, constructed primarily of bricks but with wood siding at the cross-gable. The gable overhangs the entryway porch, and is supported with a bracket.

=== Hotels and Apartment Buildings ===
- Garfield Manor Apartments, 71 Garfield (1922) The Garfield Manor was originally constructed as housing for doctors and nurses. This population soon gave way to auto workers during the boom years during and after World War II. It has been recently refurbished. The Garfield Manor is a three-story brick Beaux Arts building, consisting of three rectangular sections connected by an inner spine. The facade is symmetrical, containing a center double door with arched transom and surround. Windows are double-hung, and the facade includes decorative glazed terra cotta tiles.
- York Apartments, 74 Garfield (1928) The York Apartments originally housed a large number of nurses. By the 1950s, the majority of the people living in the York were working-class black men. The York Apartments has been demolished. The building was a four-story flat roofed brick structure, consisting of three rectangular sections connected by an inner spine and holding 50 apartments. The facade featured corbelled brickwork, limestone sills for the windows, and multi-colored ornamental glazed terra cotta tile panels. Two projecting bays with triangular parapets flanked the center entrance.
- Randora Hotel, 92–98 Garfield (1909) The Randora Hotel was originally a single-family home, built for prominent Detroit businessman Theo Backus. In 1954–55, the building was enlarged and adapted as a hotel by Randolph Wallace. Wallace was a black entrepreneur and one of two black club owners in the district, and he established the Randora to cater to black clientele in an era when hotels were still segregated. The Randora Hotel has been demolished. The Randora was a three-story brick building with two projecting wings on either side of the single-story front entrance. The hotel had a bar and ballroom, and provided nightly entertainment.
- Lay Thorne Apartments,, 4413–15 John R. (1910) The Lay Thorne was built to house six families. It was built and designed by architect T.W Cooper. It is a three-story brick symmetrical flat roof Commercial Style apartment building with two full height three-part bays flanking the center entrance. The corners have raised brick quoins and there is a double stringcourse in above the third floor windows.
- Carlton Apartments, 4425–27 John R. (1909) The Carlton is almost identical to the Lay Thorne, save it lacks the brick quoining and has limestone lintels.
- Carver Hotel, 87-89 Canfield (1926) The Carver was built in 1926 for white clients, but by the 1950s catered to a black clientele. The Carver also contained a restaurant on the ground floor. This is a four-story brick Renaissance Revival hotel contains four rectangular sections connected by a spine. The front facade has five arches at ground level outlining door and window openings. Limestone stringcourses are between the first and second floors and between the third floor and the roof.

=== Church ===
- Church of the New Jerusalem (Swedenborgian), 92 E. Forest (1915) Church of the New Jerusalem (Swedenborgian) congregation built this church and used it until 1940, when the congregation moved to Royal Oak. The Grace Baptist Missionary Church then moved into the building. It later housed social service agency Crossroads of Michigan, but has been vacant since 2008. The building was purchased by Midtown Detroit Inc in 2011. The church is a simple two-story brick Gothic Revival structure with four large arched windows per side. A single large, arched window covers most of the upper facade, below which is an arched limestone vestibule. Two pilasters flank the arched window. The church was purchased in 2020 by Birmingham developer Neal Check, owner of RainCheck Development. RainCheck will convert the building into 14 apartments while restoring the exterior under the direction of the Detroit Historic District Commission.

=== Commercial Buildings ===
- Palmetto Garage, 52 E. Forest (1926) This building was constructed to offer private parking to the residents of the Palmetto Apartments, located on John R and Hancock. It was used by the Palmetto until 1933, after which it was used as an auto repair shop. It currently houses the N'Namdi Center for Contemporary Art. The building is a single-story brick commercial structure divided into three bays. The narrower end bays contain doorways and the wider center bay windows.
- Welker Letter Company, 66 E. Forest (1938) This industrial building housed a printing company from 1938 until the 1960s. It was later used by a number of other businesses, including a dairy, a drug-counseling center, and a child care center. It is currently part of the N'Namdi Center for Contemporary Art. The building is a single-story, International Style brick commercial building with a flat roof.
- Canwood Garage, 99 Canfield (1929) The Canwood garage likely provided parking spaces for the patrons of the next door Carver Hotel. The building is a one-story, red-brick Commercial Style building with flat roof. Two large bays flank a smaller center opening.
- Unnamed building, 109–117 Canfield (1918) This building has three storefronts. The corner store housed Jewish-owned pharmacy from 1929 to 1957. The building is a one-story, red-brick Commercial Style building with flat roof. The three storefronts are tied together by a common parapet.
