= Edwin S. George Building =

- U.S. National Register of Historic Places
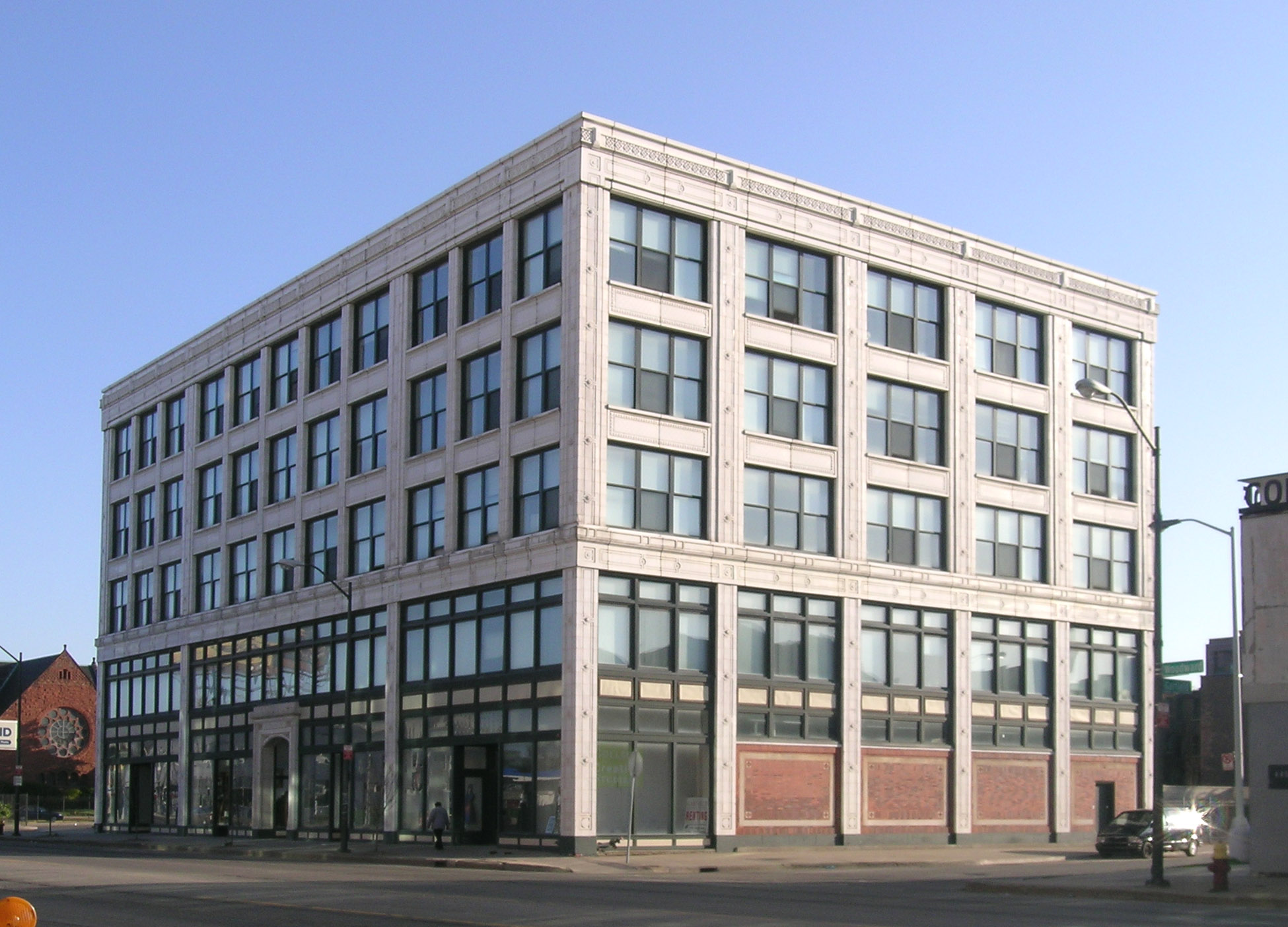
- Garfield Building seen from across Woodward
- Interactive map
- Location: 4612 Woodward Avenue; Detroit, Michigan
- Coordinates: 42°21′15.08″N 83°3′43.73″W
- Built: 1908; 1914 (addition)
- Architect: Albert Kahn
- Architectural style: Late 19th And Early 20th Century American Movements
- NRHP reference No.: 93000651
- Added to NRHP: July 22, 1993

The Edwin S. George Building, built in 1908, is located at 4612 Woodward Avenue in Midtown Detroit, Michigan, at the corner of Woodward and Garfield. In 1914, the name was changed to the Garfield Building. It was listed on the National Register of Historic Places in 1993.

== History ==
Edwin S. George was an important businessman in Detroit at the turn of the 20th century. He first came to Detroit in 1890 and worked as a furrier, opening his own wholesale and retail fur company in 1897. He became involved in Detroit's automobile industry and was an important developer of the stretch of Woodward between Grand Circus Park and Warren Avenue.

In 1908, George hired architect Albert Kahn to design a two-story building which would include rental space for auto parts suppliers and manufacturers. This building opened as the Edwin S. George Building. In 1914, George had three additional floors added to the building (also designed by Kahn) and changed the name to the Garfield building. George owned the building until 1942, when he sold it to a real estate investment firm. Wayne County Community College used the Garfield Building in the 1970s. The building was converted to condominiums in 2000, and became known as the Lofts at Garfield.

== Architecture ==
The original Edwin S. George Building was a two-story square building with a flat roof, with a white glazed terra cotta facade. Embellishments were added to make the building attractive. The additional three floors added in 1914 are architecturally consistent with the lower floors.
