= Harmonie Centre =

- Harmonie Centre (Breitmeyer–Tobin Building)
- U.S. National Register of Historic Places
- U.S. Historic district – Contributing property
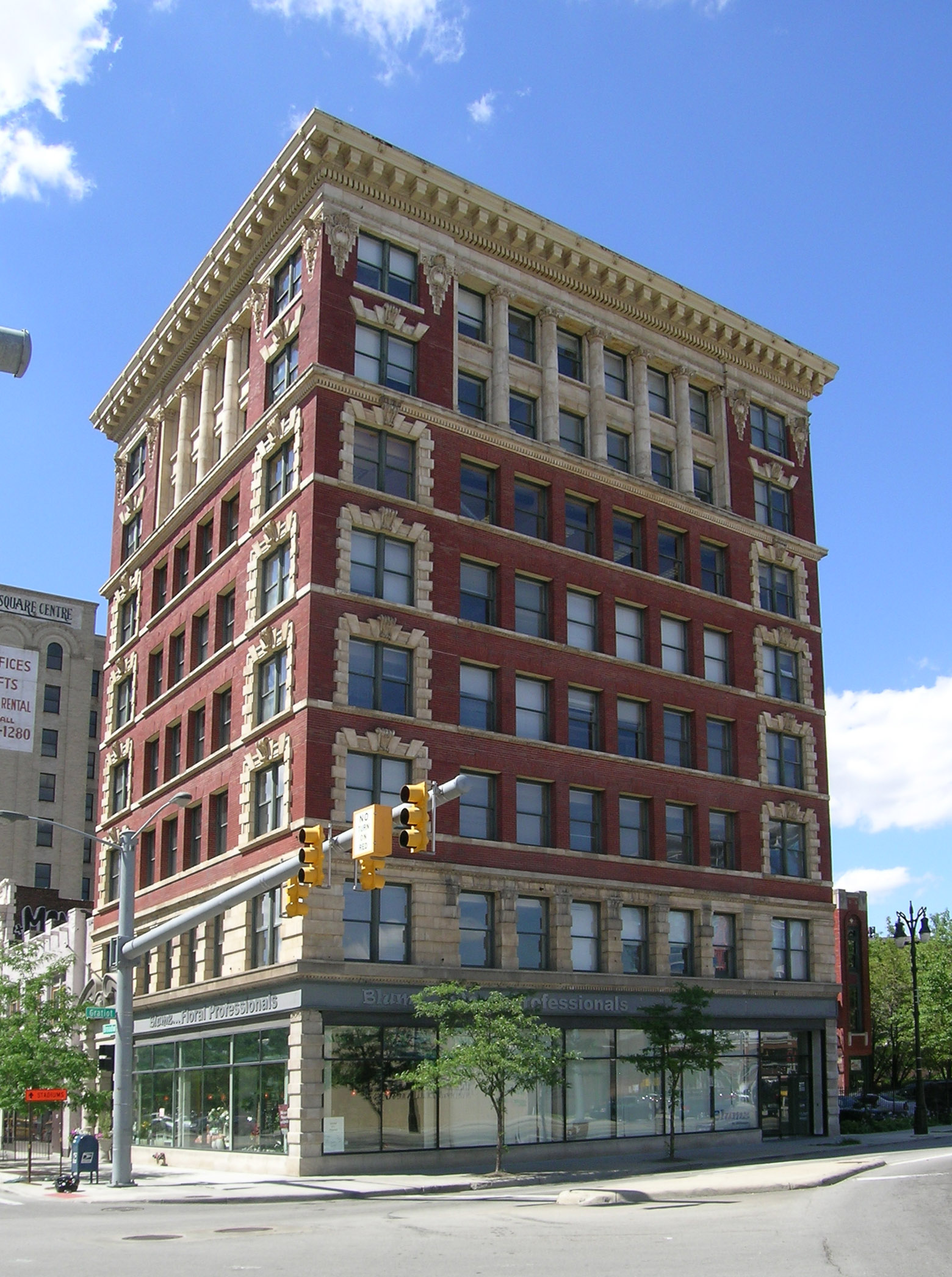
- View from Gratiot Avenue
- Interactive map
- Location: 1308 Broadway Street; Detroit, Michigan
- Coordinates: 42°20′6″N 83°2′45″W
- Built: 1906
- Architect: Raseman & Fischer
- Architectural style: Beaux-Arts
- Part of: Broadway Avenue Historic District (ID04000656)
- NRHP reference No.: 80001918
- Added to NRHP: March 10, 1980

The Harmonie Centre, also known as the Breitmeyer–Tobin Building, is an eight-story commercial building located at 1308 Broadway Street (at the corner of Broadway and Gratiot) in Downtown Detroit. It is part of the Broadway Avenue Historic District. It is also known as the Tobin Building. The building was listed on the National Register of Historic Places in 1980. The east necklace of downtown links Grand Circus and the stadium area to Greektown along Broadway. The east necklace contains a sub-district sometimes called the Harmonie Park District, which has taken on the renowned legacy of Detroit's music from the 1930s through the 1950s and into the present.

== History ==
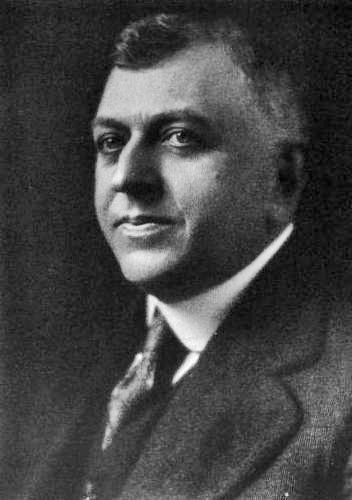
Philip Breitmeyer, c. 1922

The Breitmeyer–Tobin Building was built in 1906 for John Breitmeyer Sons, Florists, who were at the time the leading florists in Detroit. The firm's president, Philip Breitmeyer, served as the mayor of Detroit from 1909 to 1911.

In 1926, the ownership of the building was transferred to the Peninsular Bank Company, and the building was renamed the Peninsular Bank Building. The bank failed, and ten years later, in the depths of the Great Depression, the building was 75% unoccupied; the main tenant was the Metropolitan Life Insurance Company, who occupied the top floor. Metropolitan was notable for its willingness to write small insurance policies for African Americans. At around the same time, the owners of the building opened up office space to rental by African Americans; the building was one of the first downtown to do so.

In 1944, Benjamin Tobin acquired the building, renamed it the Breitmeyer–Tobin Building, and marketed the office space to black professionals. Notable African American firms had offices in the building, including the Brotherhood of Sleeping Car Porters (the largest Black union in America at the time); the law firm of Loomis, Jones, Piper and Colden; attorney Harold Bledsoe; optometrists William H. and Lloyd Lawson; and future judges Damon Keith and Hobart Taylor Jr.

The building has recently been refurbished, with commercial space on the first floor and various offices in the upper floors.

== Description ==
The eight-story building, designed by the architectural firm of Raseman & Fischer, is an unusual Beaux-Arts building from the turn of the century. It includes glazed terra cotta elements.

== See also ==
- Harmonie Club (Detroit, Michigan)
- Music of Detroit
