= David Whitney House =

Historic house in Michigan, United States

- U.S. National Register of Historic Places
- Michigan State Historic Site
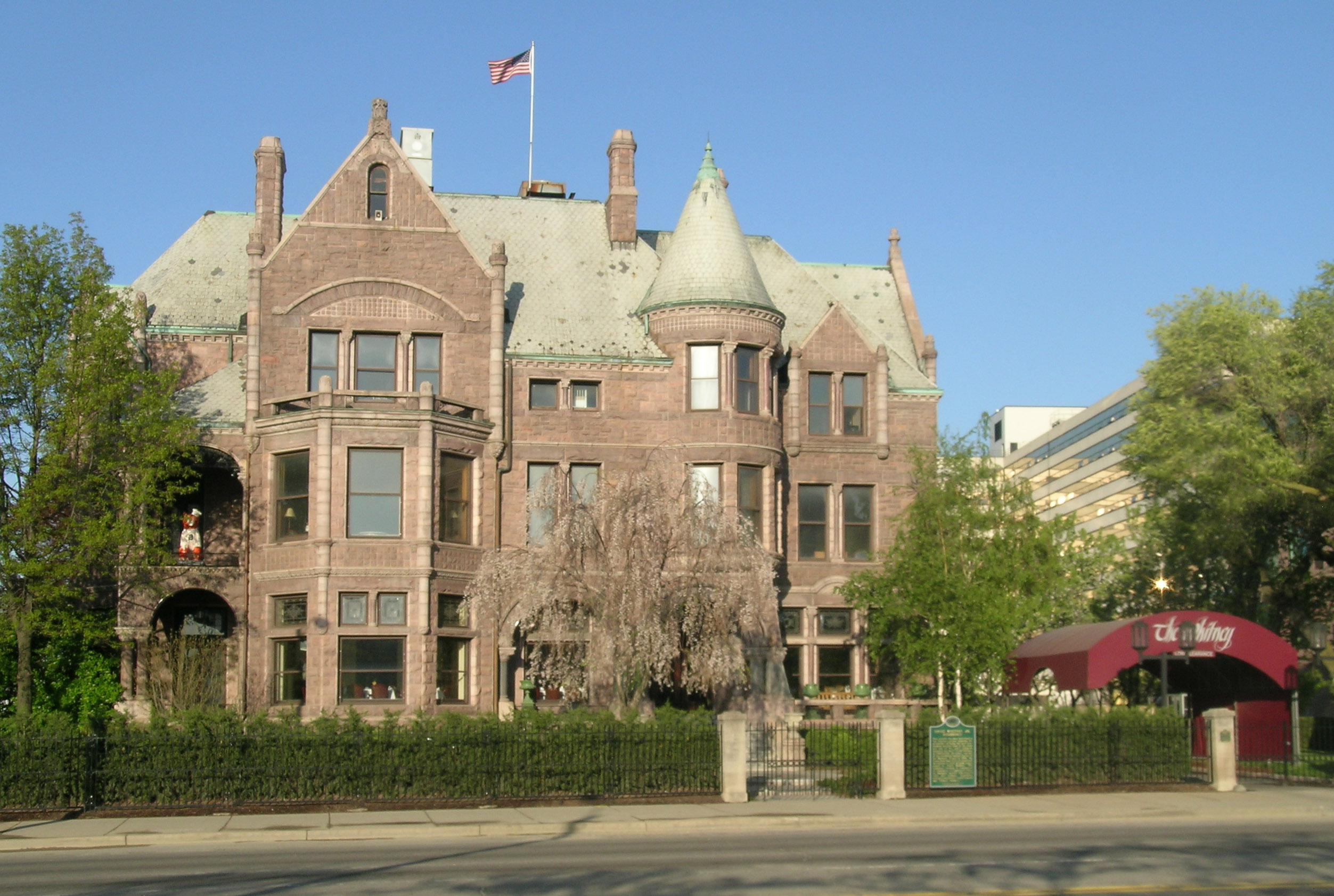
- The David Whitney House in 2008
- Interactive map
- Location: 4421 Woodward Avenue; Detroit, Michigan, U.S.
- Coordinates: 42°21′9.57″N 83°3′43.55″W
- Built: 1894
- Architect: Gordon W. Lloyd
- Architectural style: Romanesque Revival
- NRHP reference No.: 72000671

Significant dates
- Added to NRHP: August 21, 1972
- Designated MSHS: December 10, 1971

The David Whitney House is a Romanesque Revival mansion at 4421 Woodward Avenue in Midtown Detroit, Michigan. Completed in 1894 to the designs of architect Gordon W. Lloyd for lumber entrepreneur David Whitney Jr., it features rose-pink jasper stone cladding and numerous art-glass windows. The property was individually listed on the National Register of Historic Places in 1972. Since 1986, the building has housed a restaurant.

== History and construction ==
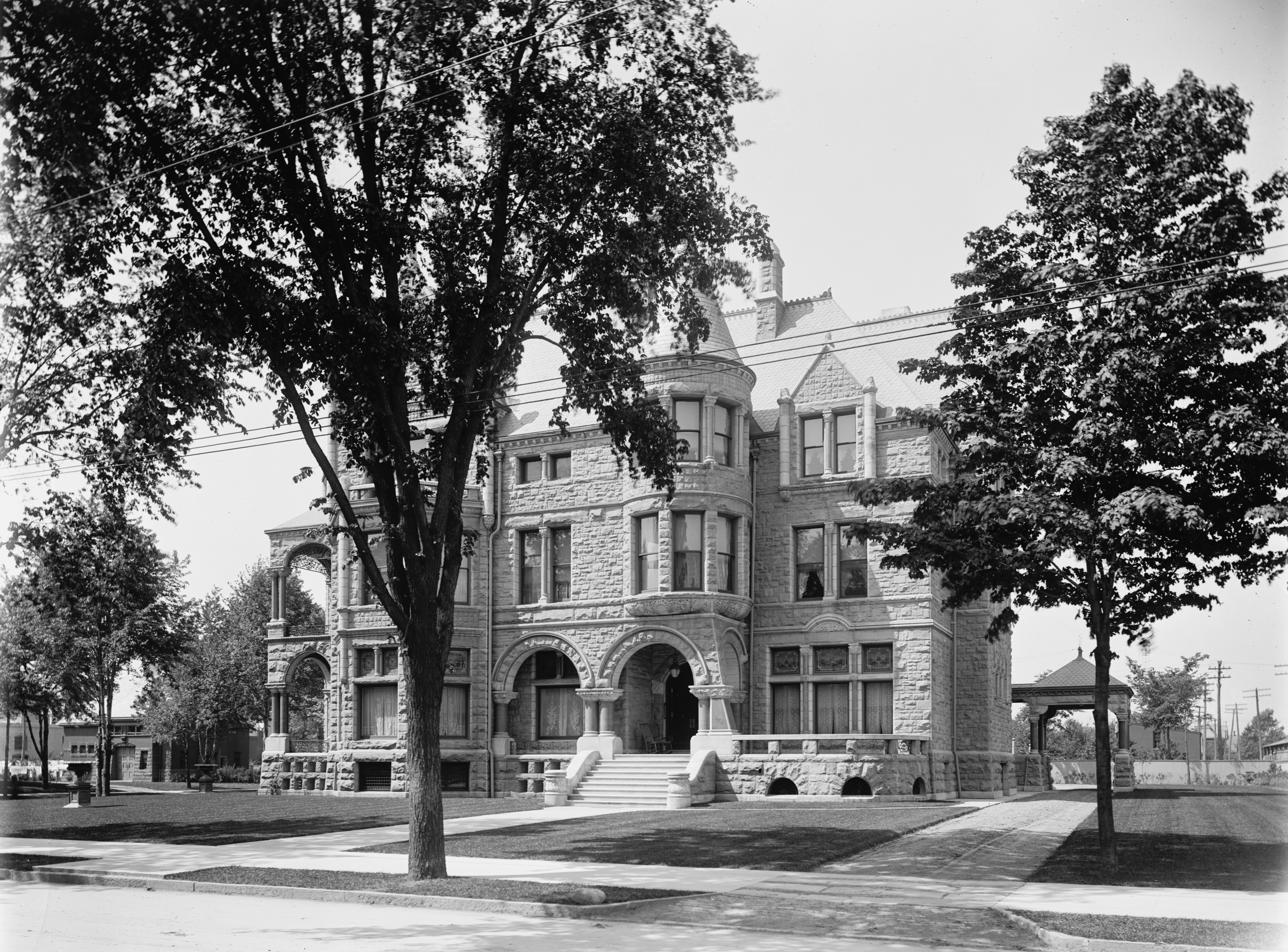
The Whitney House, c. 1905

The house was built between 1890 and 1894 by a prominent lumber baron, David Whitney Jr., who was considered not only one of Detroit's wealthiest personalities, but also one of Michigan's wealthiest citizens. The house is estimated to have cost US$400,000 at the time, and it was featured in several contemporaneous newspapers.

The exterior is constructed using pink jasper from South Dakota. It is measured to be 21,000 square feet (2,000 m^{2}) and has 52 rooms (including 10 bathrooms), 218 windows, 20 fireplaces, a secret vault in the dining room, an elevator, and numerous Tiffany glass windows.

The Tiffany glass windows have been estimated to be worth more than the house itself. The window designs often feature themes oriented around the purpose of the rooms they are located in. For example, the music room's windows are themed towards elements of music as well as images of Saint Cecilia, the patron saint of music. A prominent stained-glass window depicting a medieval knight overlooks the main staircase. Architectural historians note that the window reflects the romantic historicism popular in Gilded Age interiors, rather than any verified family heraldry.

== Architecture ==
Designed by Gordon W. Lloyd in the Romanesque Revival mode, the house is clad in rose-pink jasper stone from South Dakota and arranged around formal reception rooms, including a music room and a conservatory off the dining room. The Canfield Ave. elevation combines gables, bays, and dormers, while a large carriage house (reportedly the state’s largest when built) served the property. The original coach house incorporated a lift to bring carriages to an upper level.

== David Whitney Jr. ==
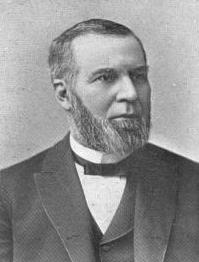
David Whitney Jr., c. 1891

David Whitney Jr. was born in 1830 in Watertown, Massachusetts. Whitney made his millions in Massachusetts as a lumber baron. He moved to Detroit from Lowell (where he had established himself as a lumber baron) in 1857, at the young age of twenty-seven. Starting a joint venture with his brother Charles, he continued to expand his vastly successful lumber business into Ohio, Indiana, and Pennsylvania.

Whitney was always fascinated by the Detroit Athletic Club (DAC). Part of the DAC's grounds is now under the possession of Wayne State University. Included among the elite members of the original DAC were Whitney and his son David C. Whitney. This influenced his choice for the location of the Whitney House, as it overlooked the grounds of the DAC. The Whitney mansion was built between 1890 and 1894, and estimated to have cost approximately $400,000. After Whitney's death in 1900, his family continued to reside in the mansion until 1920. It was converted into an upscale restaurant in 1986.

== Ownership ==
In 1957, the Visiting nurse association purchased the house for $150,000. In 1979, the house was sold to Detroit-based real estate magnate Richard Kughn, who in 2007 sold it to former Chrysler executive, Arthur “Bud” Liebler, for more than $2 million.

Following the Whitney family’s occupancy into the 1920s, the house became headquarters of the Wayne County Medical Society; the Visiting Nurse Association purchased the property in 1957, aided by the Metropolitan Detroit Building Fund and the McGregor Fund, for $150,000. In 1979, Detroit businessman Richard Kughn acquired the mansion and undertook a major rehabilitation. The building opened as a restaurant in 1986. In 2007, ownership transferred to Arthur “Bud” Liebler.

== Folklore ==
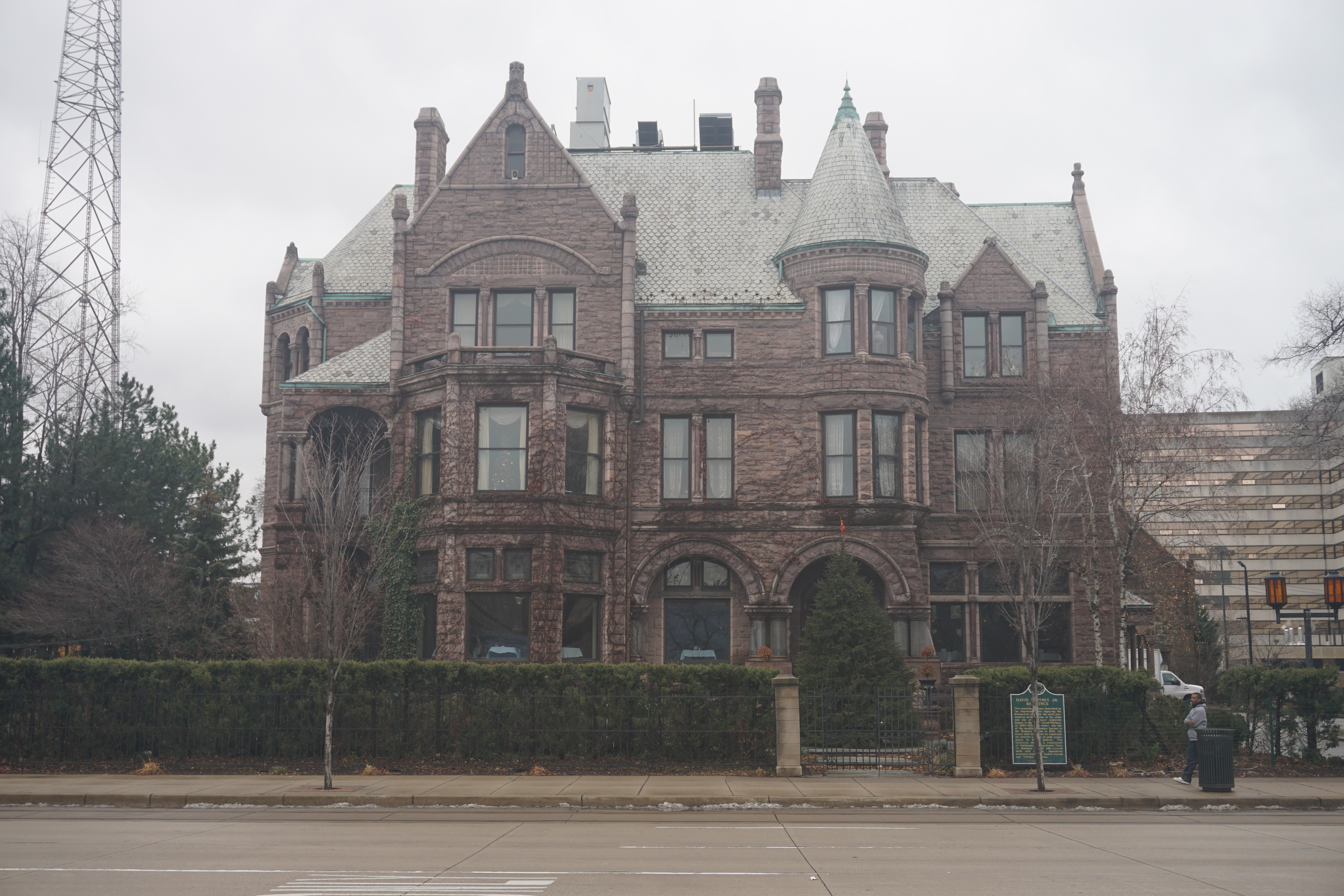
The David Whitney House in December 2021

Since its 1980s restoration, the house has occasionally been described in Detroit popular media as "haunted," primarily because of its age and ornate interior. Local features such as WDIV-TV’s "Haunted Detroit" series and The Detroit News have mentioned the Whitney in lists of reportedly haunted buildings, though no verifiable evidence supports these claims.

Whitney House interior, 2011

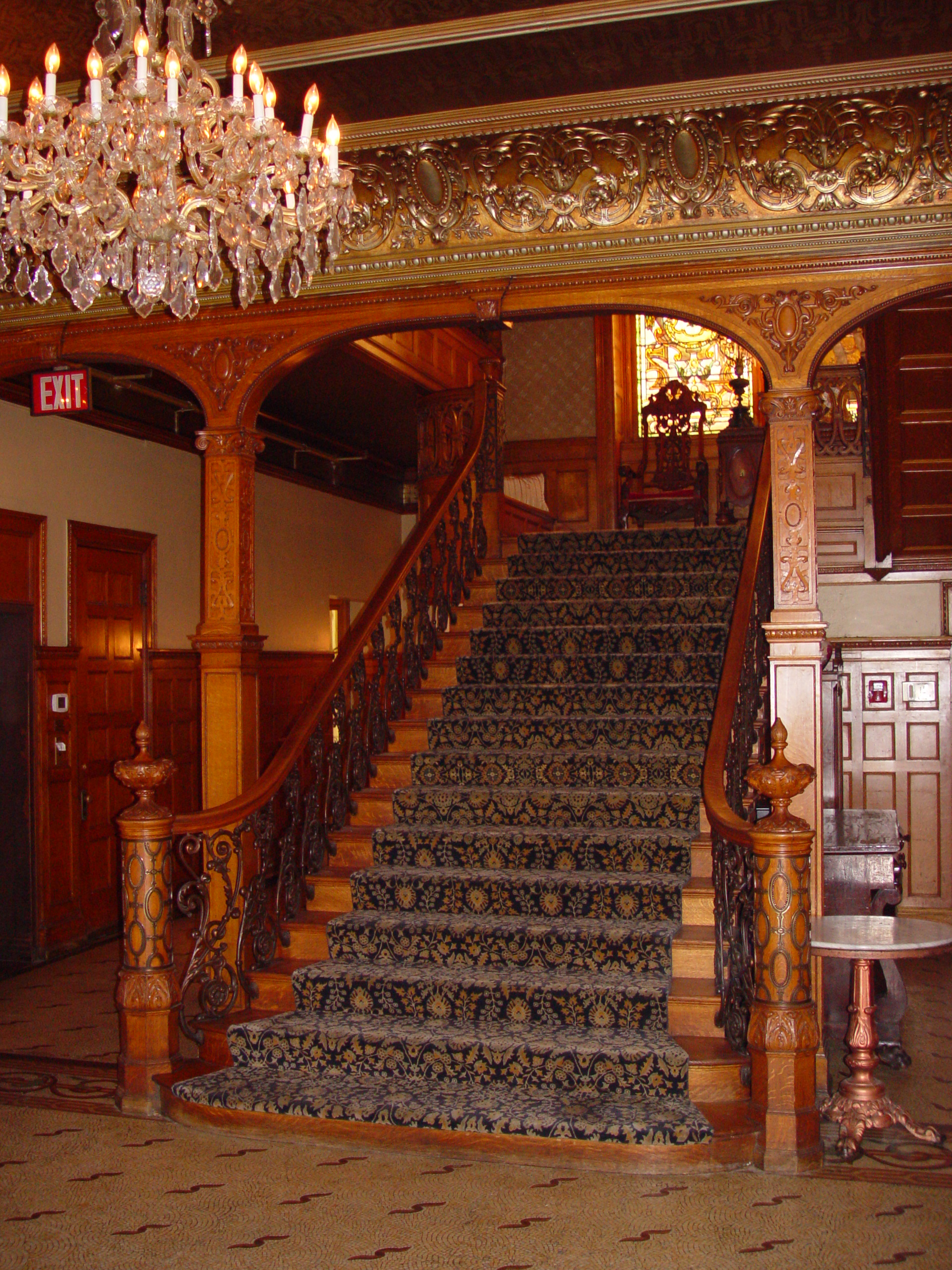

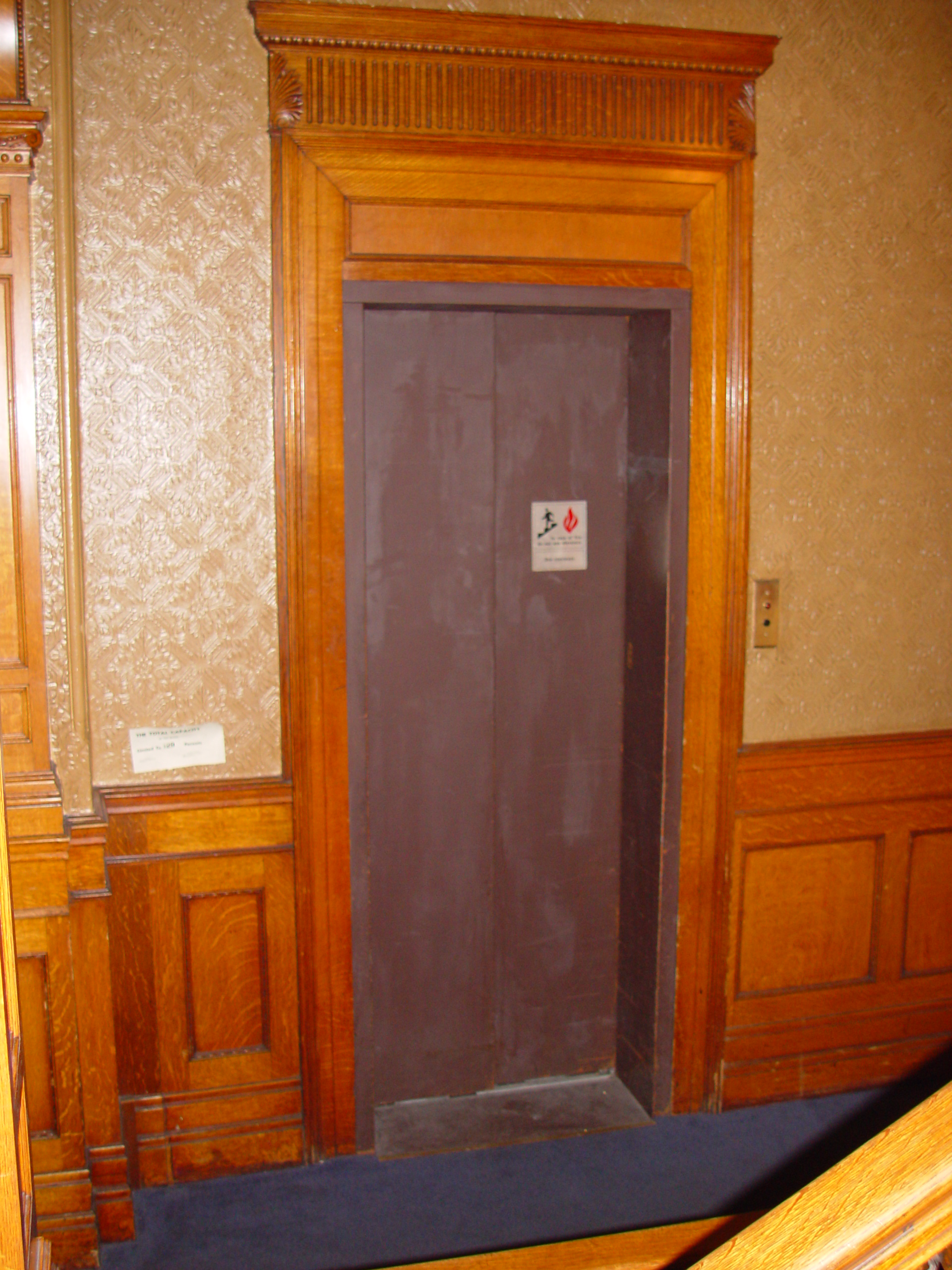

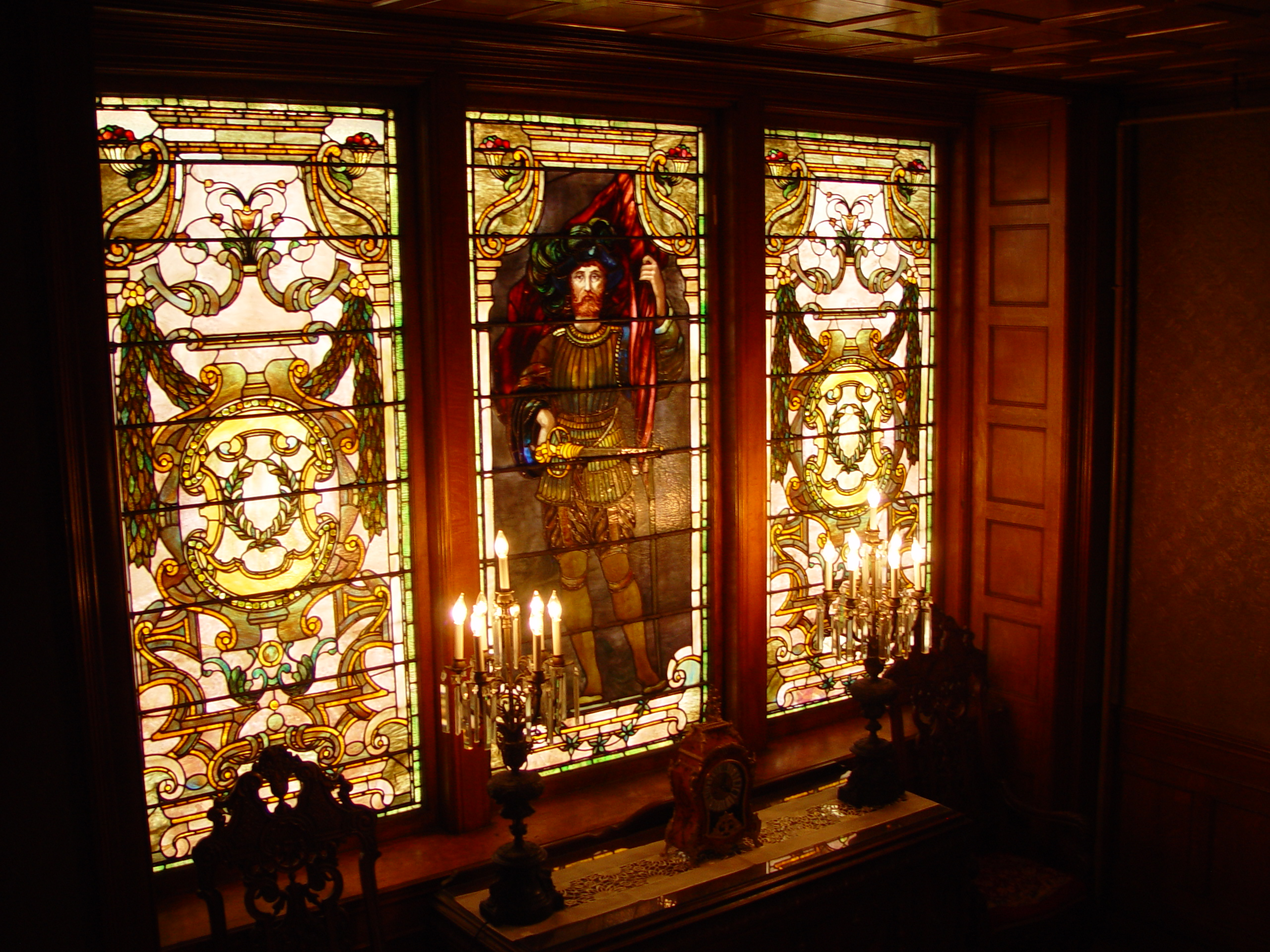

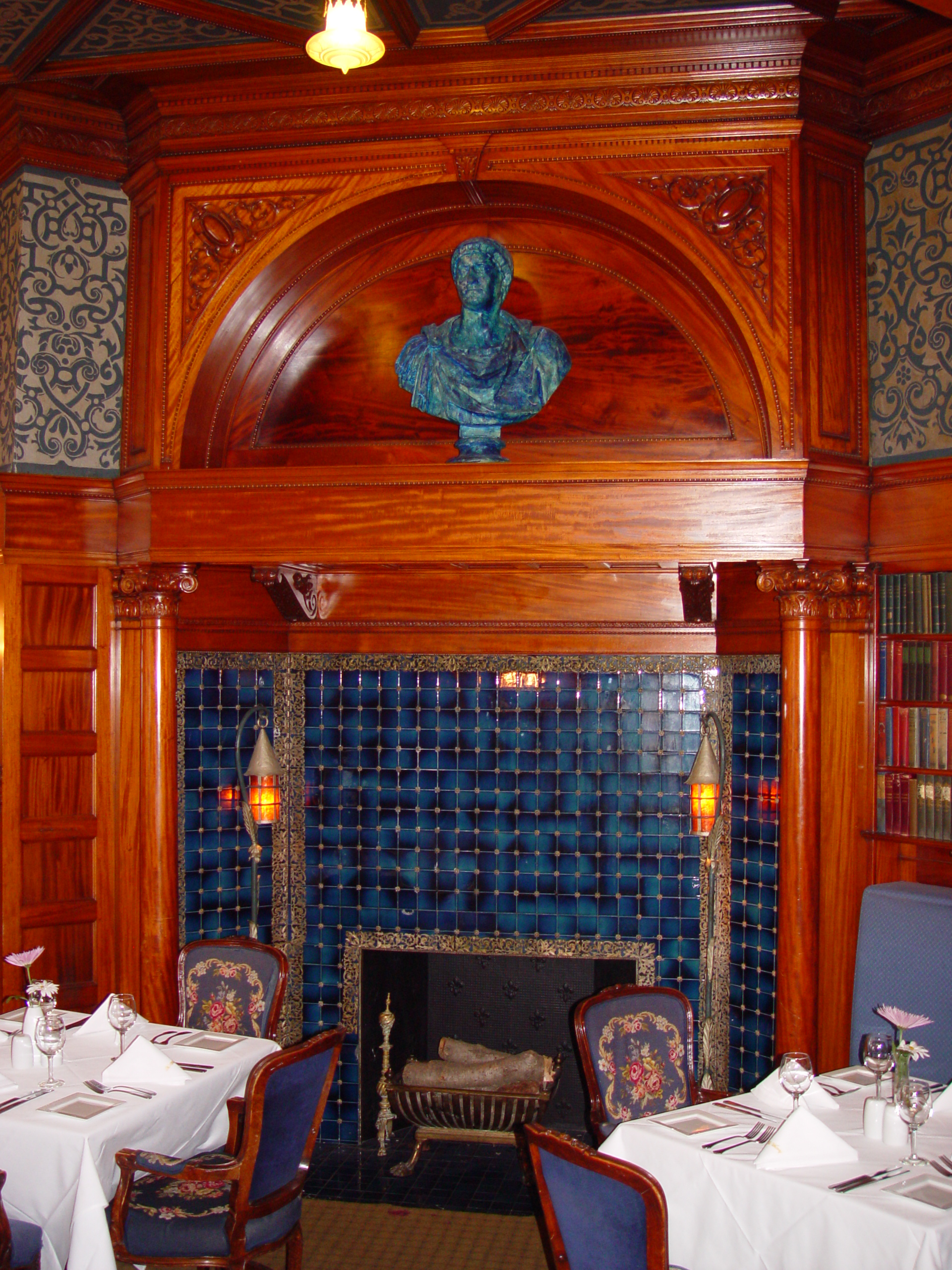

== See also ==
- Cultural Center Historic District (Detroit)
