= Gordon W. Lloyd =

English architect (1832–1904)

Gordon W Lloyd
- Born: April 6, 1832; Cambridge, England
- Died: December 23, 1904 (aged 72); San Francisco, California
- Resting place: Elmwood Cemetery, Detroit, Michigan
- Occupation: Architect
- Years active: 1858-1905
- Style: Second Empire, Italian Revival, Gothic Revival, Eastlake, Romanesque and Queen Anne.

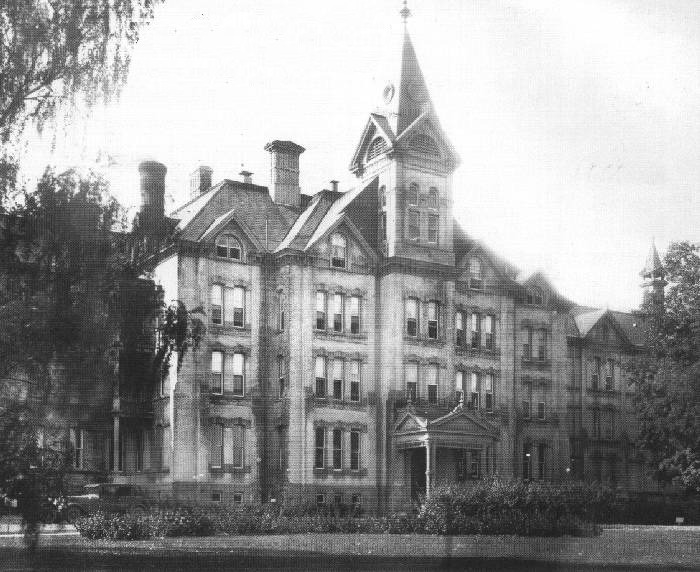
"Building 50", the former Northern Michigan Asylum

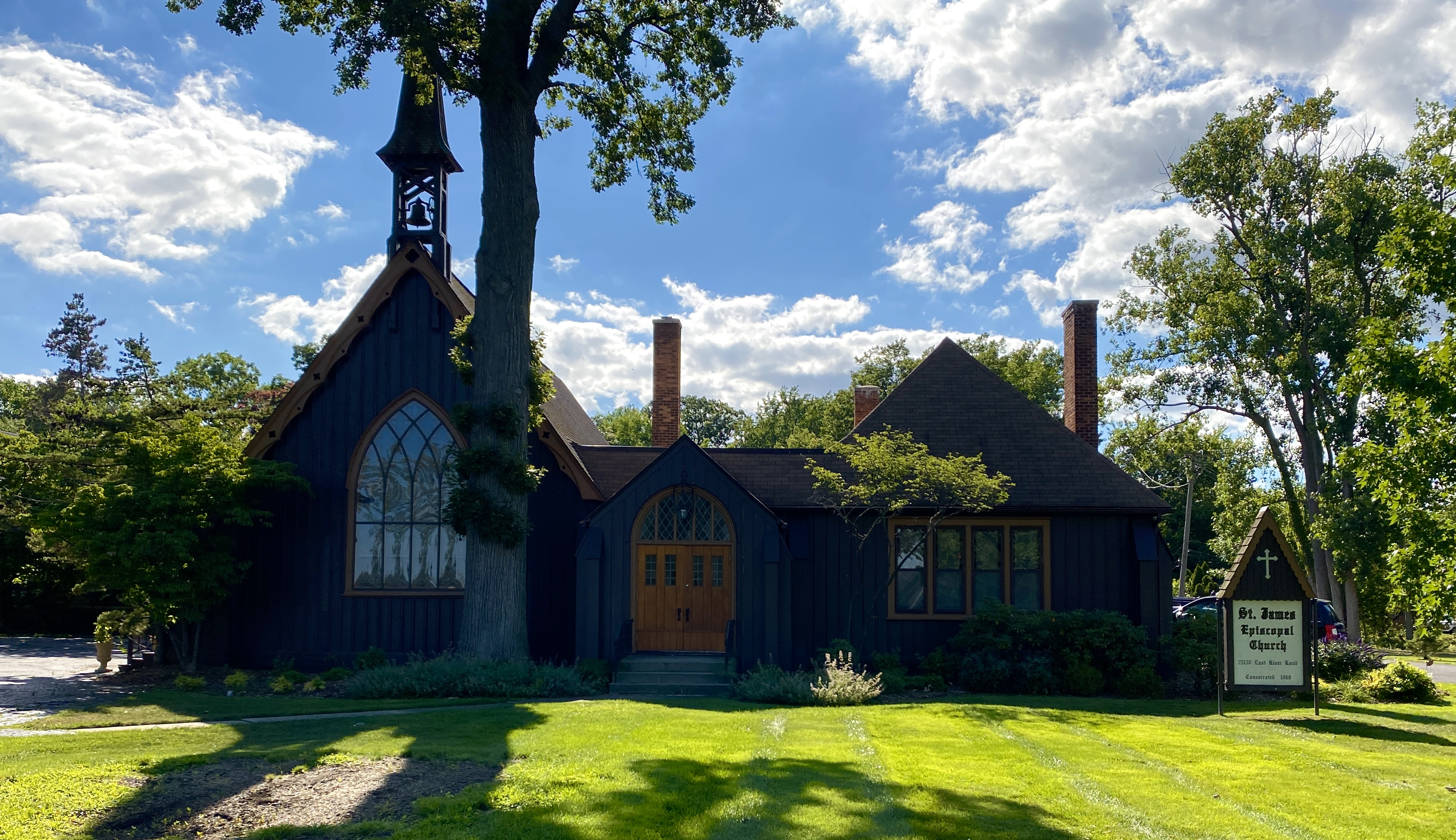
St. James Episcopal Church, Grosse Ile, Michigan

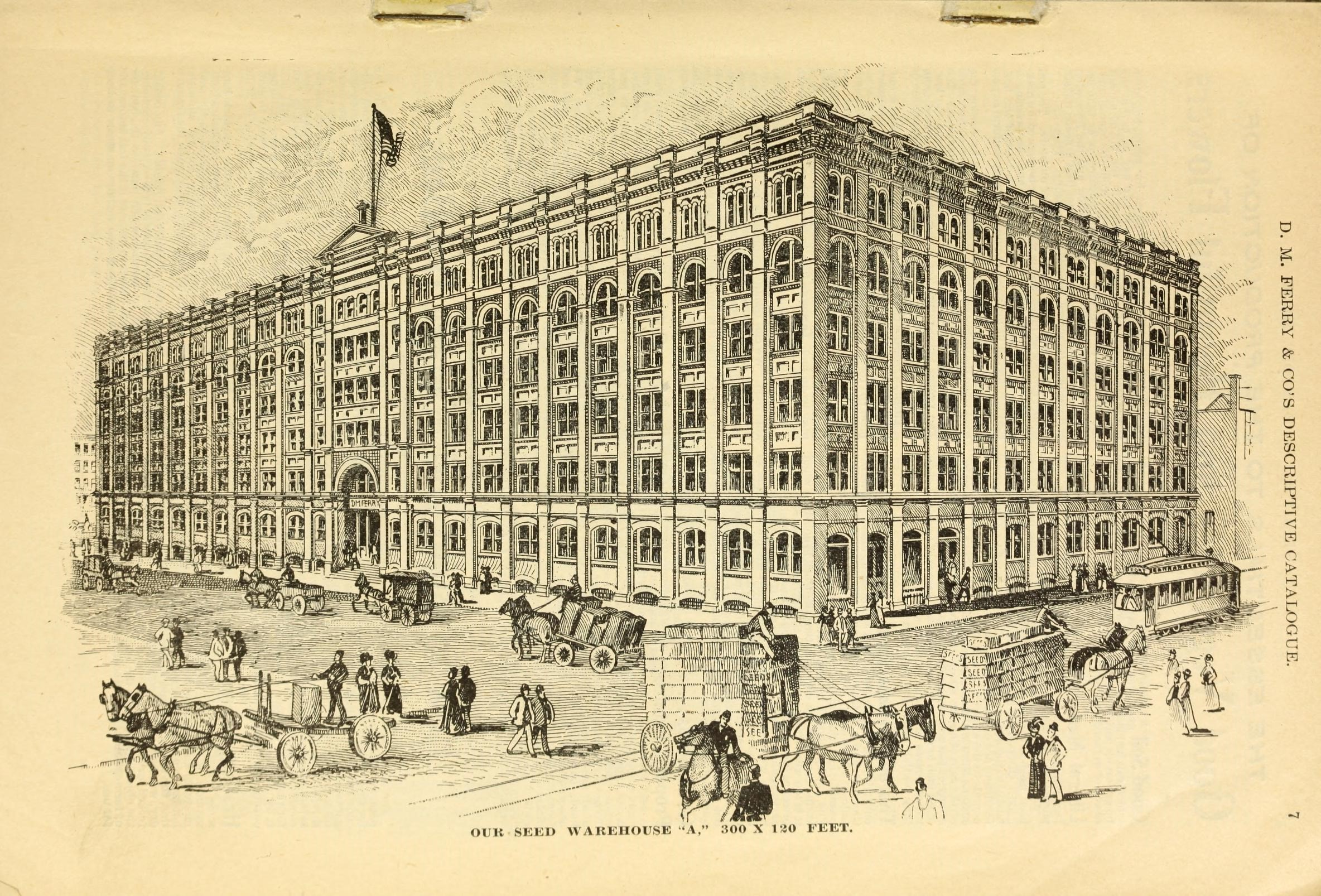
D. M. Fery Warehouse, 1887

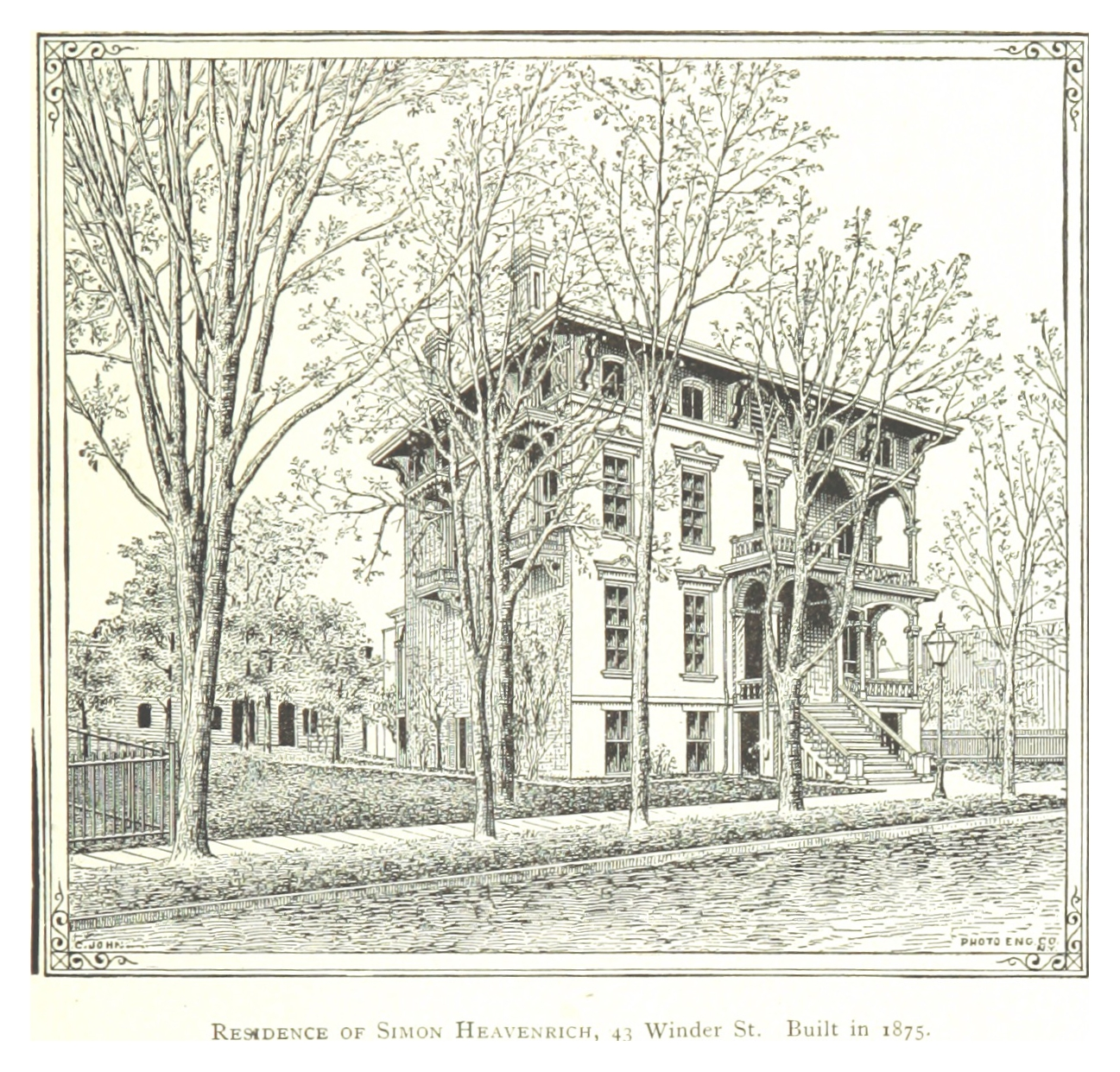
Simon Heavenrich residence in 75 Winder Street, built in 1875.

Gordon W. Lloyd (April 6, 1832 – December 23, 1904) was an English-born architect who practiced mainly in the American Midwest from the late 1850s through the 1890s. Trained under his uncle, the prominent church architect Ewan Christian, Lloyd opened an office in Detroit in 1858 and became especially active designing Episcopal churches while also producing major commercial and residential commissions. Representative works include the Trinity Cathedral (1872) in Pittsburgh, the Wright–Kay Building (1891) in Detroit, and the David Whitney House (1894). Though his office was in Detroit, Lloyd resided nearby in Windsor, Ontario.

== Career ==
Lloyd’s Midwestern practice centered on ecclesiastical work for Episcopal clients, but he also designed banks, police and university buildings, and large residences. Contemporary sources and later scholarship note his recurring use of Gothic Revival for church commissions and Queen Anne and Romanesque motifs for commercial and residential work.

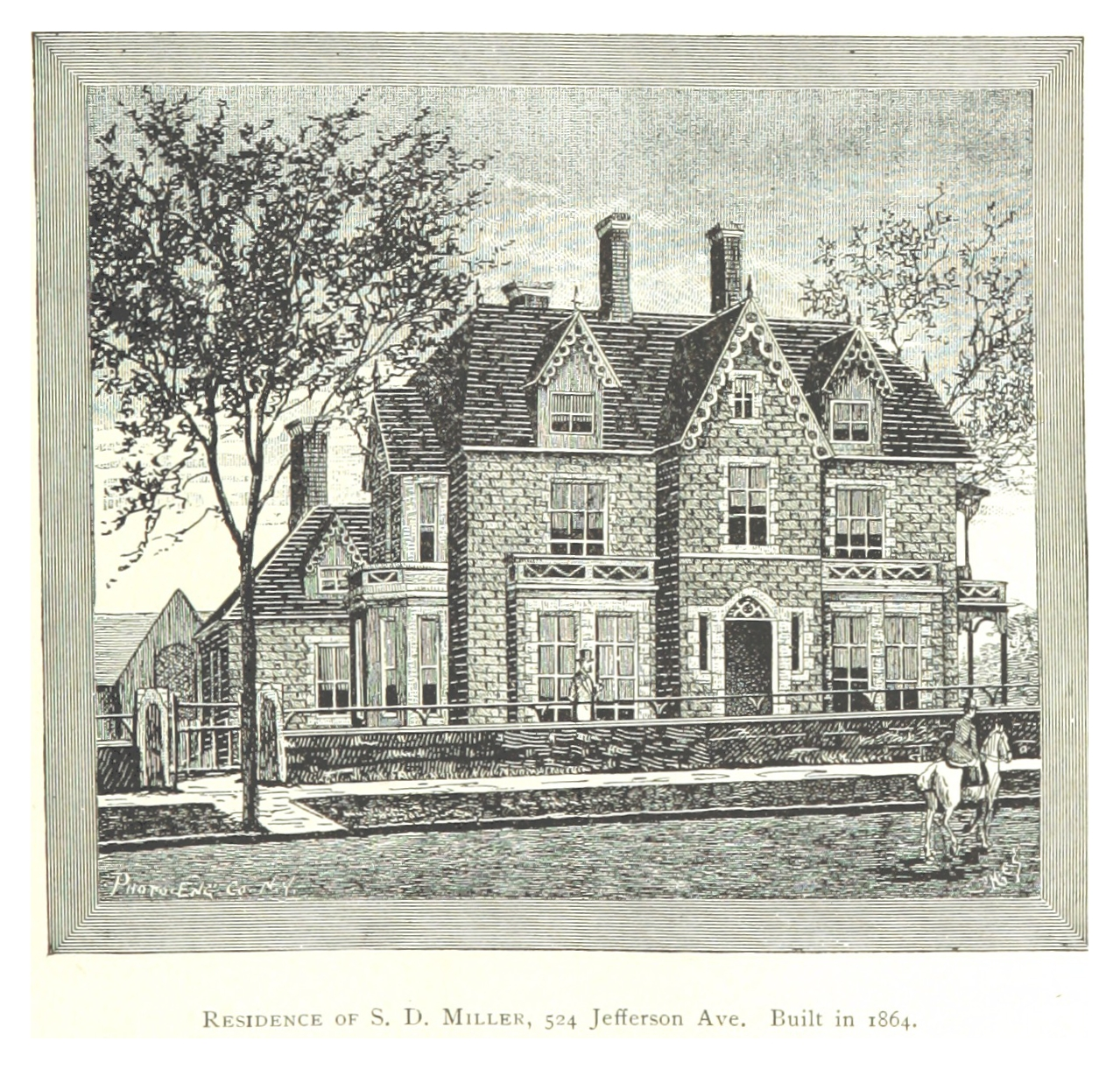
Sidney D Miller residence, built in 1864, in 1432 E Jefferson Avenue.

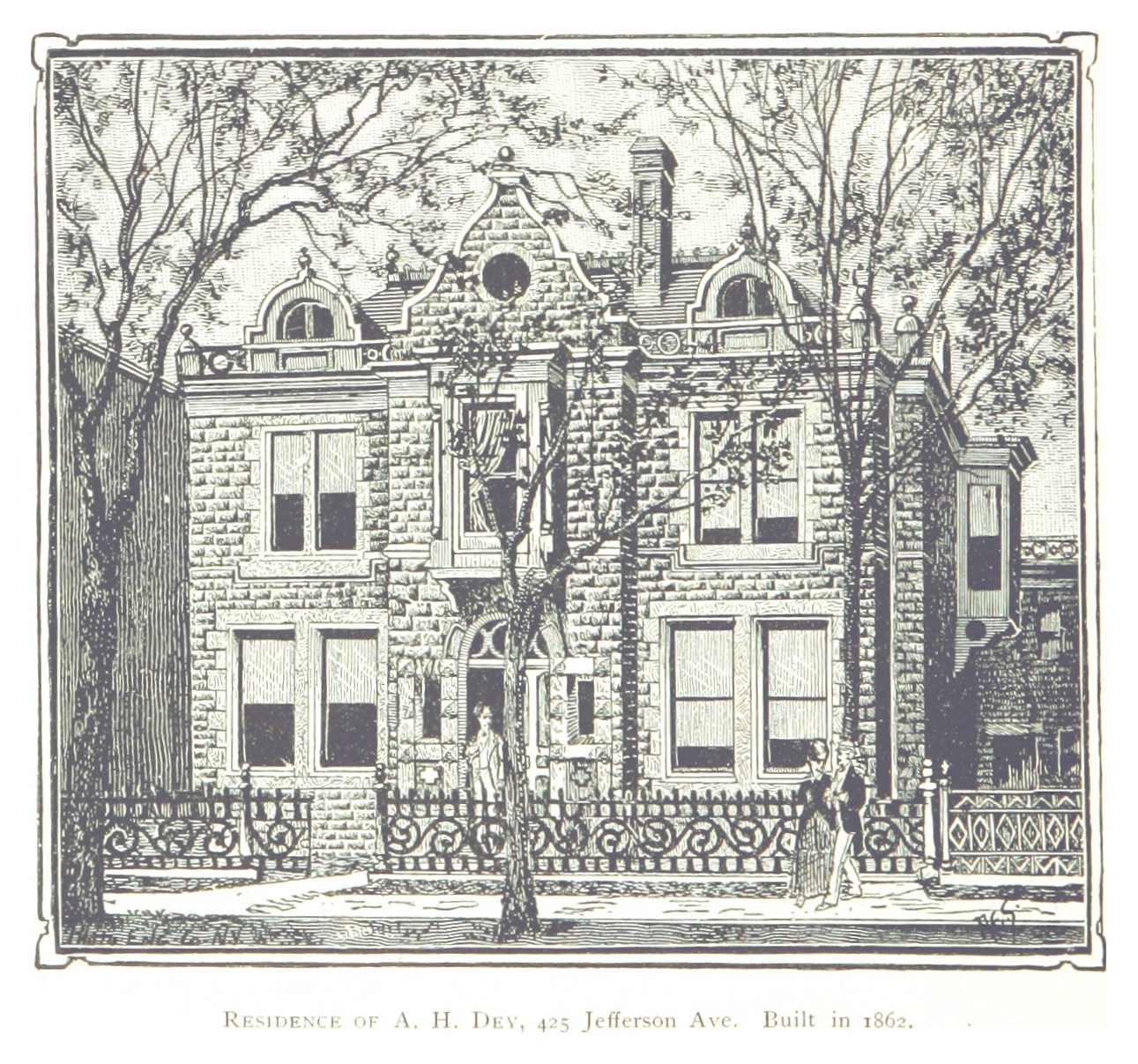
Alexander H Dey residence, built in 1862, in 965 E Jefferson Avenue.

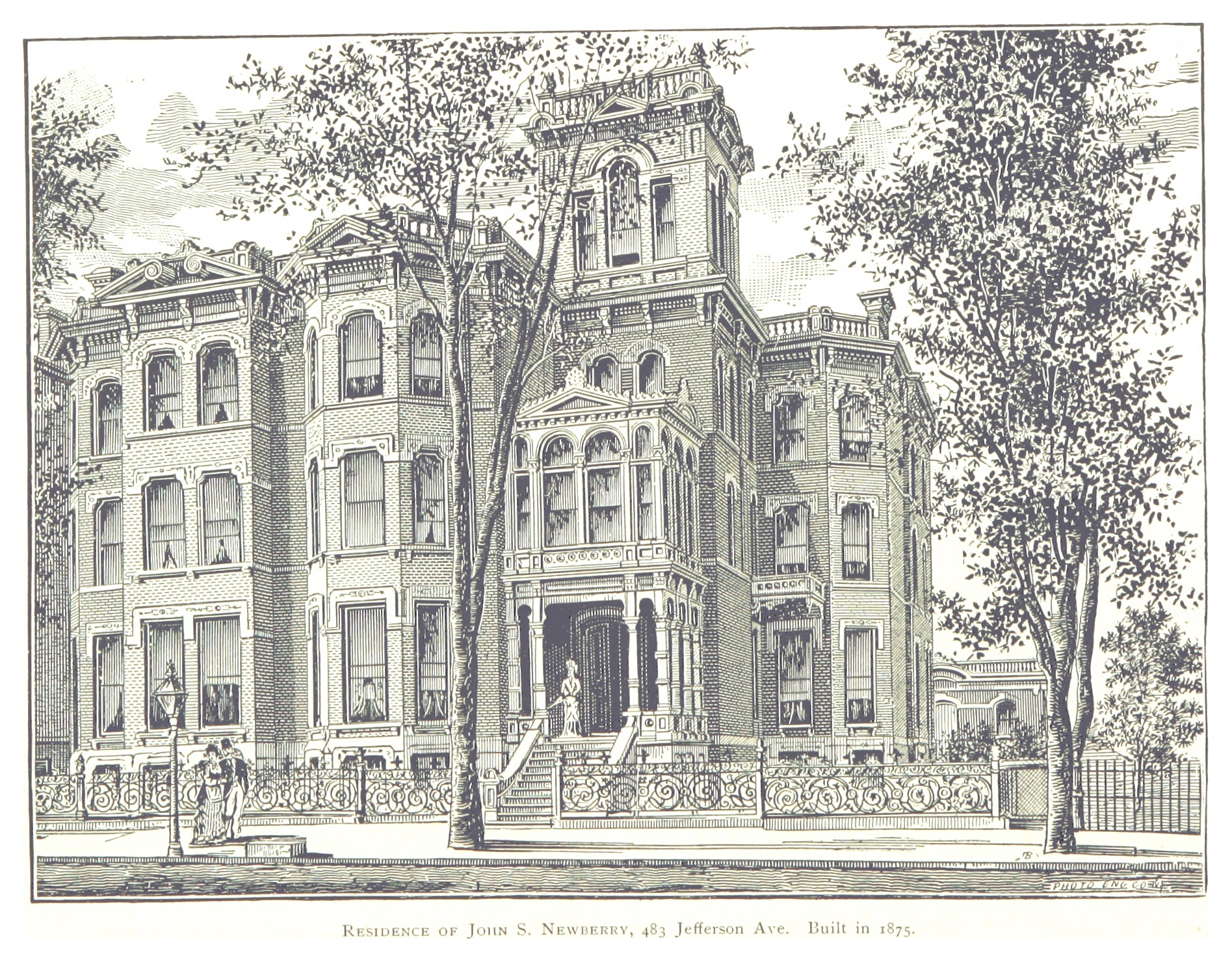
John S Newberry residence, built in 1876, in 1363 E Jefferson.

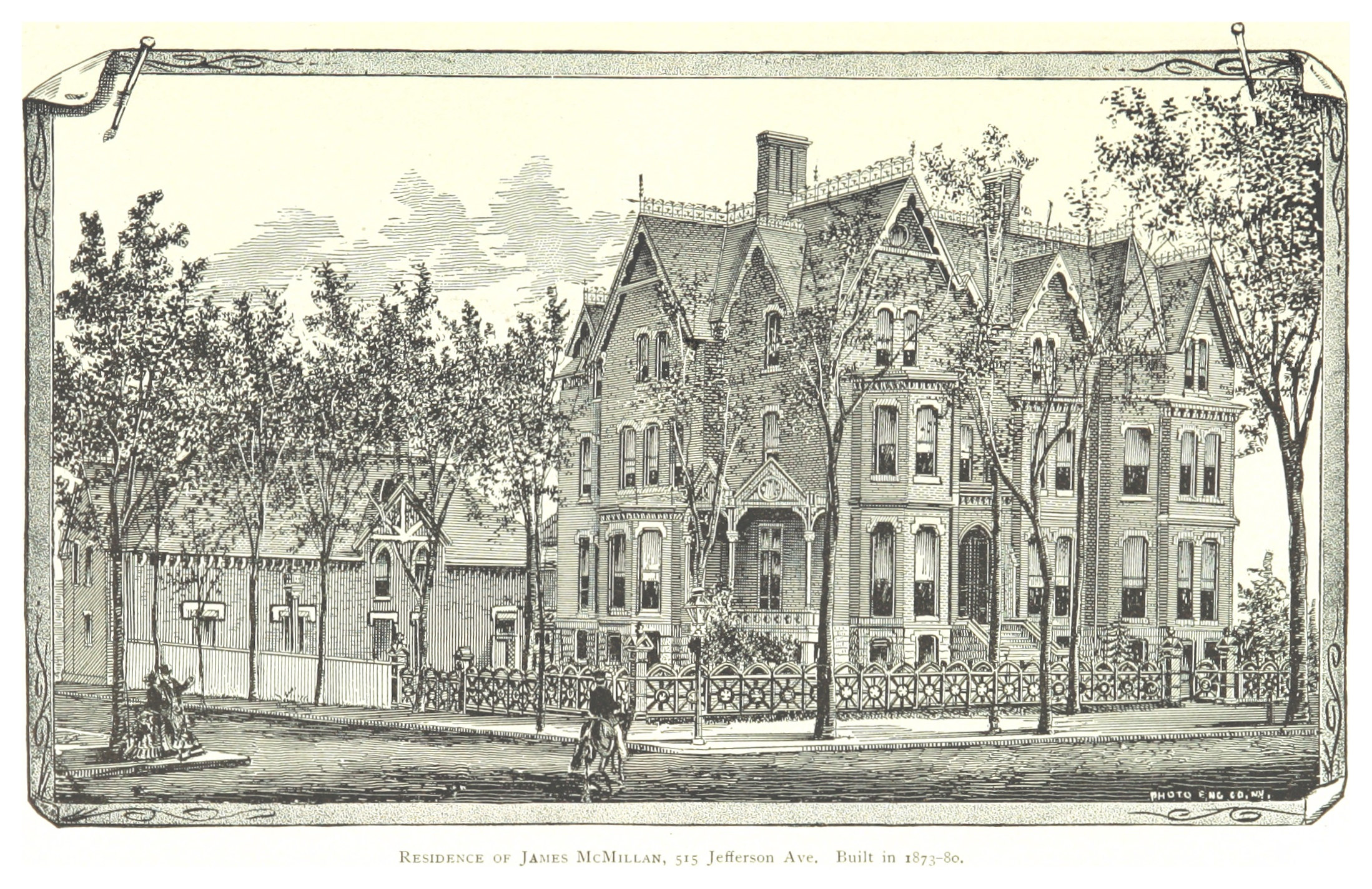
James McMillan residence, built in 1873, in 1411 E Jefferson.

== Main works ==
This list enumerates all of Lloyd's documented works with those still standing in bold.

- **Anthony Dudgeon Residence (1859) 1859 East River Road, Grosse Ile, Michigan**
- **Samuel T. Douglass Residence (1859) 1859 East River Road, Grosse Ile, Michigan**
- Christ Church Anglican, Chatham, Ontario (1861)
- Alexander H. Dey Residence (1862) 965 East Jefferson Avenue Detroit, MI Demolished in 1960s
- **Christ Church Detroit, (1863), 960 East Jefferson Avenue, Detroit, MI**
- **Trinity Episcopal Church (1864) 101 E. Mansion Street, Marshall, MI.**
- Sidney D. Miller Residence (1864) 1432 East Jefferson Avenue, Detroit, MI. Demolished in 1955.
- Seventh Street School (1866) 2525 Brooklyn, Detroit, Mi. Demolished in 1899.
- Detroit & Milwaukee Railway Company Passenger Depot (1866) 400 Atwater, Detroit, MI. Demolished in 1973.
- **Central United Methodist Church, (1866),23 East Adams, Detroit, MI**
- Our Lady of Help Roman Catholic Church (1867) 3156 East Congress, Detroit, MI. Demolished in 1968.
- **Saint Andrew's Episcopal Church (1867) 306 North Division Street, Ann Arbor, MI.**
- **Cathedral of St. Paul (Erie, Pennsylvania), (1866) 134 W. Seventh St.**
- **St. James Episcopal Church, Milwaukee, Wisconsin, (1867),833 West Wisconsin Avenue**
- **St. James Episcopal Church, Grosse Ile, Michigan, (1867), 25150 East River Road**
- **First Congregational Church (1868) 403 South Jefferson Avenue, Saginaw, MI.**
- **Thomas A. Parker House, (1868), 975 East Jefferson Avenue, Detroit, MI**
- Trinity Episcopal Church (1868) 304 South Monroe Street, Monroe, MI
- John Pridgeon Residence (1868) 2666 Woodward Avenue, Detroit, MI. Demolished in 1890s
- Grace Episcopal Church (1869) 550 W Fort Street, Detroit, MI. Demolished in 1920s
- **Trinity Episcopal Church, Columbus, Ohio, (1869),125 East Broad Street.**
- **Grace Episcopal Church (1870)115 South Main Street, Mount Clemens, MI.**
- Church of the Holy Spirit, Kenyon College, Gambier, Ohio, (1871)
- Saint Mary of Good Counsel Catholic Church, Adrian, Michigan, (1871) 305 Division Street.
- Dr, William Brodie Residence (1871) 304 West Lafayette Boulevard Detroit MI. Demolished in 1914.
- Saint Vincent's Female Orphan Asylum (1872) 529 McDougall, Detroit, MI. Demolished in 1960s
- **Trinity Cathedral Episcopal Church (1872) 328 Sixth Street, Pittsburgh, PA.**
- **Church of the Holy Spirit (1872) 102 College Park Street, Gambier, OH.**
- **Chapter House for Trinity Anglican Church, London, Ontario, Canada, 1872-1873**
- **Saint Paul's Episcopal Church (1873) 711 South Saginaw, Flint, MI.**
- James McMillan Residence (1873) 1411 East Jefferson Avenue, Detroit, MI. Demolished in 1931.
- Joseph A. Moross Residence (1873) 6371 Woodward Avenue, Detroit, MI. Demolished in 1960s
- Henry Webber Block (1873) 1037 Woodward Avenue, Detroit, MI. Demolished in 1960s.
- **Forest Hill Cemetery** **gatehouse, Ann Arbor, Michigan (1874)**
- Hone of the Friendless (1874) 7 West Waren, Detroit, MI. Demolished in 1927.
- Rev Caspar Borgess Residence (1874) 1219 Washington Boulevard, Detroit, MI. Demolished in 1920s.
- C. J. Whitney & Company Building (1874) 140 West Fort Street, Demolished in 1911.
- **All Saints Episcopal Church (1874) 252 Grand Street, Saugatuck, MI.**
- **Saint Paul's Episcopal Church (1875) 201 East Ridge Road, Marquette, MI.**
- Allan Shelden Residence (1875) 630 West Fort Street, Detroit, MI. Demolished in 1918.
- **Edward V Cicotte Double House (1875) 547-549 East Jefferson Avenue, Detroit, MI.**
- Abstract Building (1875) 125 West Lafayette, Demolished in 1912.
- Simon Heavenrich Residence (1875) 75 Winder Street, Detroit, MI. Demolished in 1931.
- Emory Wendell Residence (1875) 1397 East Jefferson Avenue, Detroit, MI. Demolished in 1920s.
- John S. Newberry Summer Residence (1875) 99 Lake Shore Drive Grosse Pointe Farms, MI. Demolished in 1910s
- James McMillan. Summer Residence (1875) 100 Lake Shore Drive Grosse Pointe Farms, MI. Demolished in 1910s
- Whitney Opera House (1875) 200 West Fort Street, Detroit, MI. Demolished in 1889.
- William G Thompson Block (1875) 1036-56 Randolph Street, Detroit, MI. Demolished in 1980s.
- Alfred.E.F White Residence (1875) 115 East Warren Avenue, Detroit, MI. Demolished in 1920s.
- **Grace Episcopal Church, Galion, Ohio, 1875, NRHP**
- Elmwood Cemetery Gatehouse (1876) Detroit, MI.
- William H Brace Resicence (1876) 488 Temple Street, Detroit, MI. Demolished in 1920.
- **First Congregational Church of Ann Arbor (1876) 608 East William, Ann Arbor, MI.**
- **Saint Paul's Episcopal Church (1876) 4120 Euclid Avenue, Cleveland, OH.**
- John S. Newberry Residence (1876) 1363 East Jefferson Avenue, Detroit, MI. Demolished in 1961.
- Edward Y. Swift Residence (1876) 804 West Lafayette Boulevard, Detroit, MI. Demolished in 1960s
- Henry P. Baldwin Residence (1877) 410 West Fort Street, Detroit, Mi. Demolished in 1930s
- Bneham Residence (1877) 625 Ledyard Street, Detroit, MI. Demolished in 1930s.
- Holy Trinity Anglican Church, Chatham, Ontario (1877–1878)
- St. John's Anglican Church, Morpeth, Ontario (1877–1878) (stripped of heritage status in 2021)
- **William L Smith Residence (1878) 457 Ledyard Street, Detroit, MI..**
- Detroit Savings Bank Building (1878) 508 Griswold, Detroit, MI. Demolished in 1929.
- The Carpenter Block (1879) 1 West Jefferson, Detroit, MI. Demolished in 1950s
- Board of Trade Building (1879) 35 West Jefferson Avenue, Detroit, MI. Demolished in 1950s
- Newberry & McMillan Building/Equity Building (1879) 428-432 Griswold, Detroit, MI. Demolished in 1929.
- Saint Mary's Hospital (1879) 1420 St. Antoine, Detroit, MI Demolished in 1990.
- Arthur C King Residence (1879) 486 Henry Street, Detroit, MI. Demolished in 1930s.
- Heavenrich Brothers Building (1880) 129 West Jefferson, Detroit, MI. Demolished in 1930s
- Harry Shelden Residence (1880) 528 West Fort Street, Detroit, MI. Demolished in 1914.
- Fred K Walker Residence (1880) 2601 East Jefferson Avenue, Detroit, MI. Demolished in 1920s.
- Archibald G. Lindsay Residence (1880) 4639 Woodward Avenue, Detroit, MI. Demolished in 1914.
- Palms Block (1881) 110 East Jefferson Avenue, Detroit, MI. Destroyed by fire in 1893.
- Traugott Schmit House (1881) 1571 East Jefferson Detroit MI. Demolished in 1960s
- Home for the Aged Little Sisters of the Poor (1881) 1825 Scott Street, Detroit, MI. Demolished in 1930s
- Westminster Presbyterian Church (1881) 3711 Woodward Avenue, Detroit, MI. Demolished in 1919.
- George F. Moore Residence (1881) 5106 Woodward Avenue, Detroit, MI. Demolished in 1925.
- Henry B. Ledyard Summer Residence (1882) 259 Lake Shore Drive, Grosse Pointe Farms, MI. Demolished in 1910s
- **Saint John's Episcopal Church (1883) 123 North Michigan Avenue, Saginaw, MI.**
- Parker Block, (1883) 1075 Woodward Avenue, Detroit, MI. Destroyed by fire in 1990.
- Central Police Station (1883) 735 Randolph, Detroit, MI. Demolished in 1928.
- Ashley Pond Residence (1884) 3112 Woodward, Detroit MI. Demolished in 1919.
- Commercial Building (1885) 200-218 West Jefferson, Detroit, MI. Demolished in 1980s
- **St. Luke's Episcopal Church, Kalamazoo, 1885**
- Engineering Shops Building (1885) 913 South University Avenue, University of Michigan, Ann Arbor, MI. Demolished in 1956.
- Russel A. Alger Residence (1885) 510 West Fort Street, Detroit, MI. Demolished in 1937.
- Joseph Tylor Residence (1885) 66 Peterboro Street, Detroit, MI. Demolished in 1960s.
- **Saint Andrew's Episcopal Church Parish House (1886) 617 East Huron Street, Ann Arbor, MI.**
- **Bishop Worthington Residence, Omaha, Nebraska, 1885**
- **"Building 50", (formerly Northern Michigan Asylum), Traverse City, Michigan, 1885, NRHP**
- **Brown Brothers Cigar Factory (1887) 119 State Street, Detroit, MI**
- Wayne Hotel (1887) 220 Third Avenue, Detroit, MI. Demolished in 1931.
- Henry Ledyard House (1887) 1545 East Jefferson. Detroit MI. Demolished in 1960s
- Grace Hospital (1888) 4160 John R, Detroit, MI, Demolished in 1979.
- **Dowling Hall, University of Detroit, (1887)**
- **R. H. Traver Company Building (1889) 1211-1219 Woodward Avenue, Detroit, MI**
- William Reed & Company Building (1890) 426-430 West Larned, Detroit, Mi. Demolished in 1984.
- **Detroit College (1890) 651 East Jefferson Avenue, Detroit, MI.**
- Laura Rust Residence (1890) 3625 Woodward Avenue, Detroit, MI. Demolished in 1950s
- **Wright-Kay Building, (1891) 1500 Woodward Avenue, Detroit, MI.**
- **D. M. Ferry Company Building (1891) 400 Monroe, Detroit, MI.**
- Women's Hospital and Foundlings Home (1891) 443 East Forest, Detroit, MI. Demolished in 1940s
- Michael Marta Residence (1891) 2129 East Jefferson Avenue, Detroit, MI. Demolished in 1960s.
- Neil Flattery Double house (1893) 612-614 East Jefferson Avenue, Detroit, MI. Demolished in 1915.
- Fred A Forbes Residence (1893) 56 East Bethune Street, Detroit, MI. Demolished in 1950s.
- **Detroit Telephone Exchange Building (1894) 116 Clifford, Detroit, MI. Extensively modified in the 60s.**
- **David Whitney House, (1894) 4421 Woodward Avenue, Detroit, MI.**
- SS Peter & Paul Parish School (1899) 601 East Larned, Detroit, MI. Demolished in 1963.

== Gallery ==
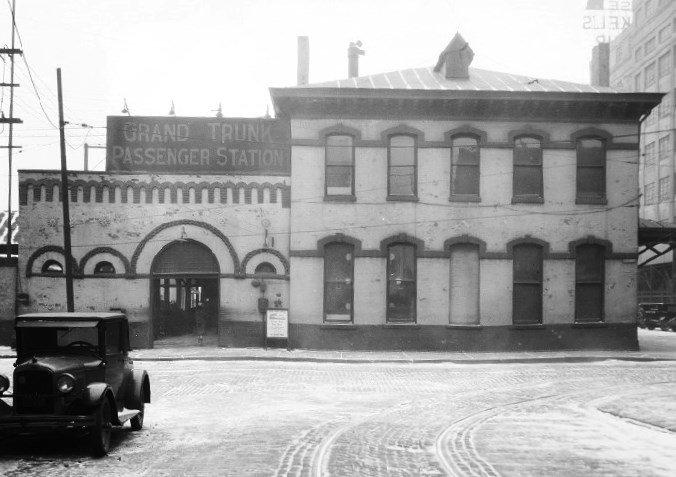
Brush Street Station, built in 1867, SE corner of Brush and Atwater

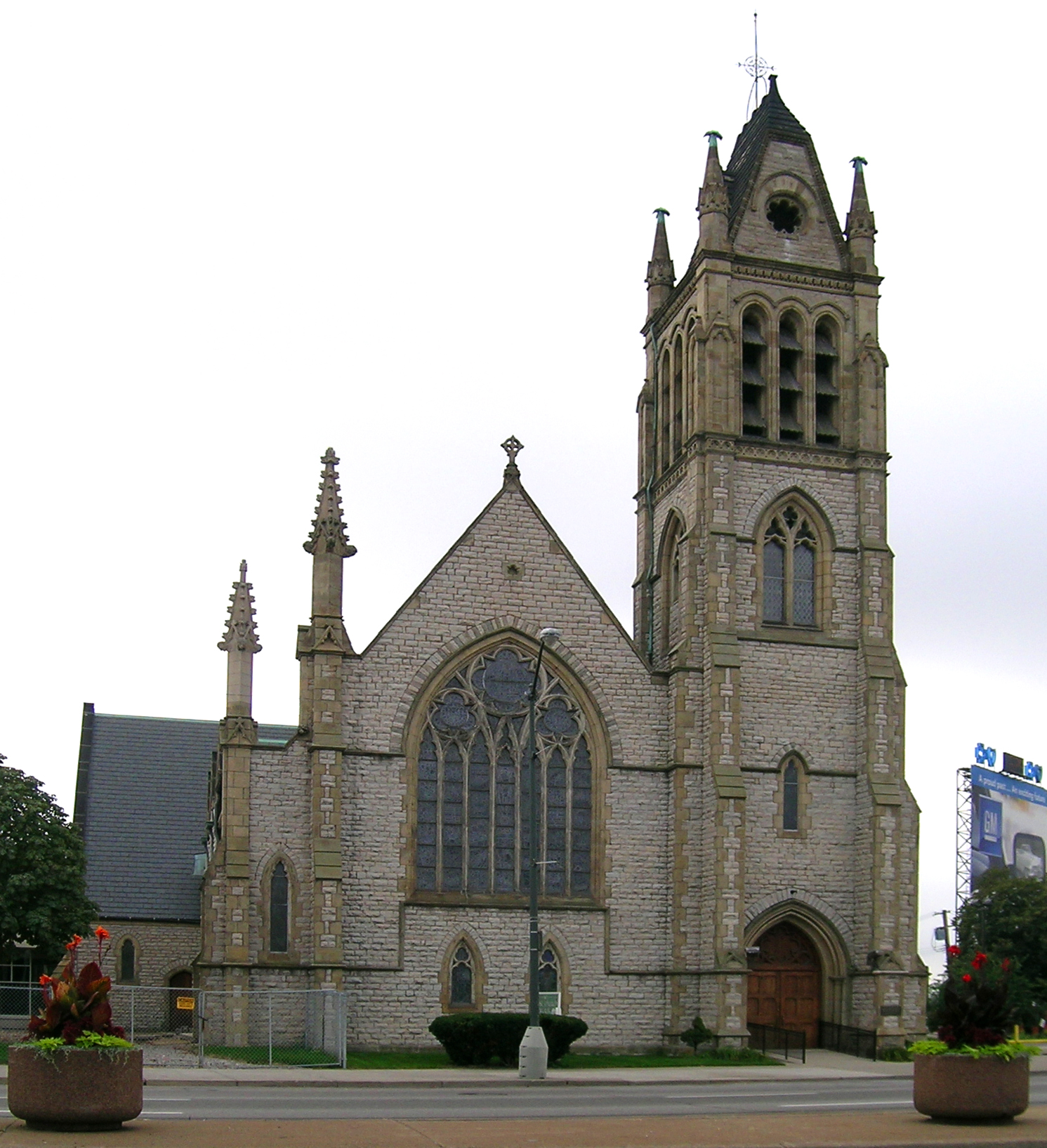
Christ Church Detroit Episcopal, built in 1861

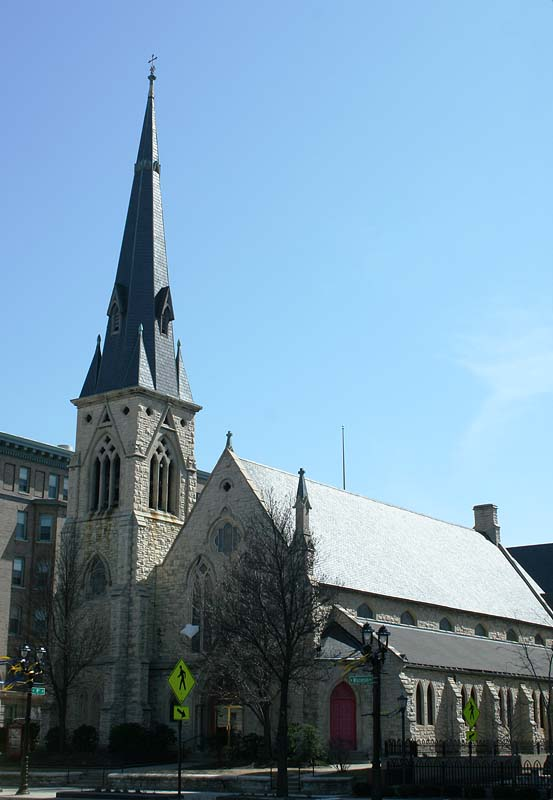
St James Episcopal Church, built in 1867, in Milwaukee

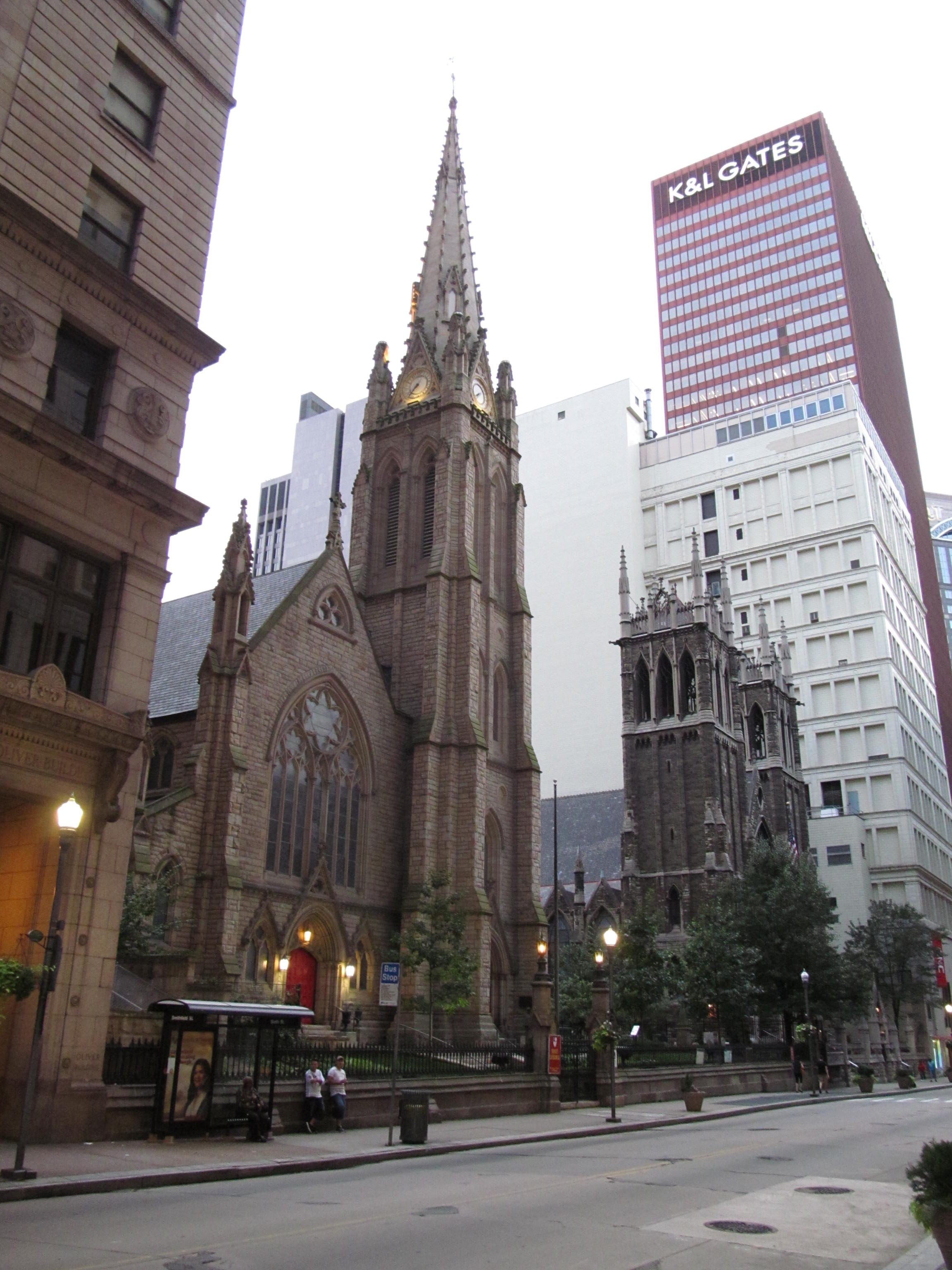
Trinity Cathedral Episcopal Church, built in 1872, in Pittsburgh

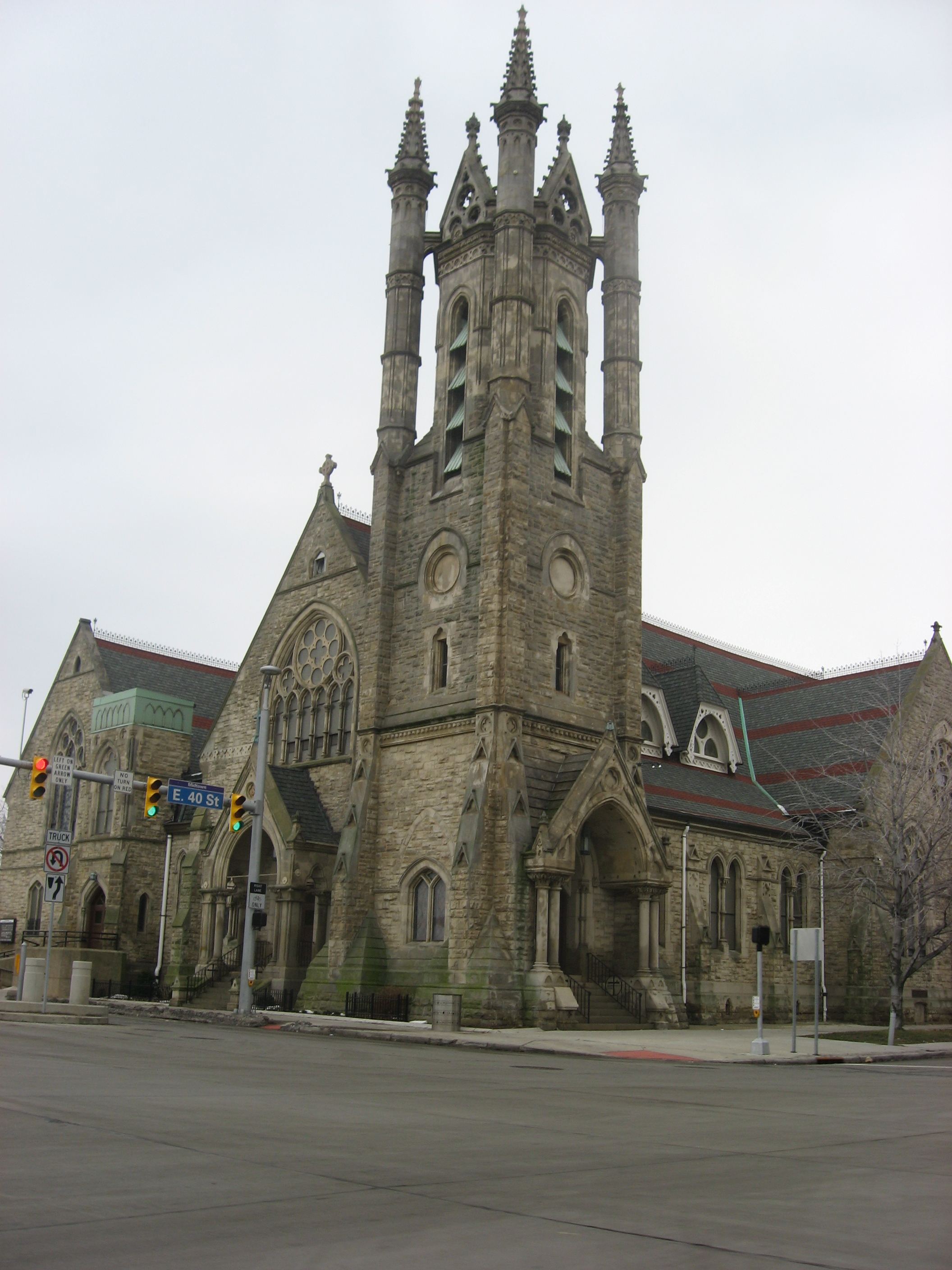
St Paul Episcopal Church (Today Catholic), built in 1876 in Cleveland

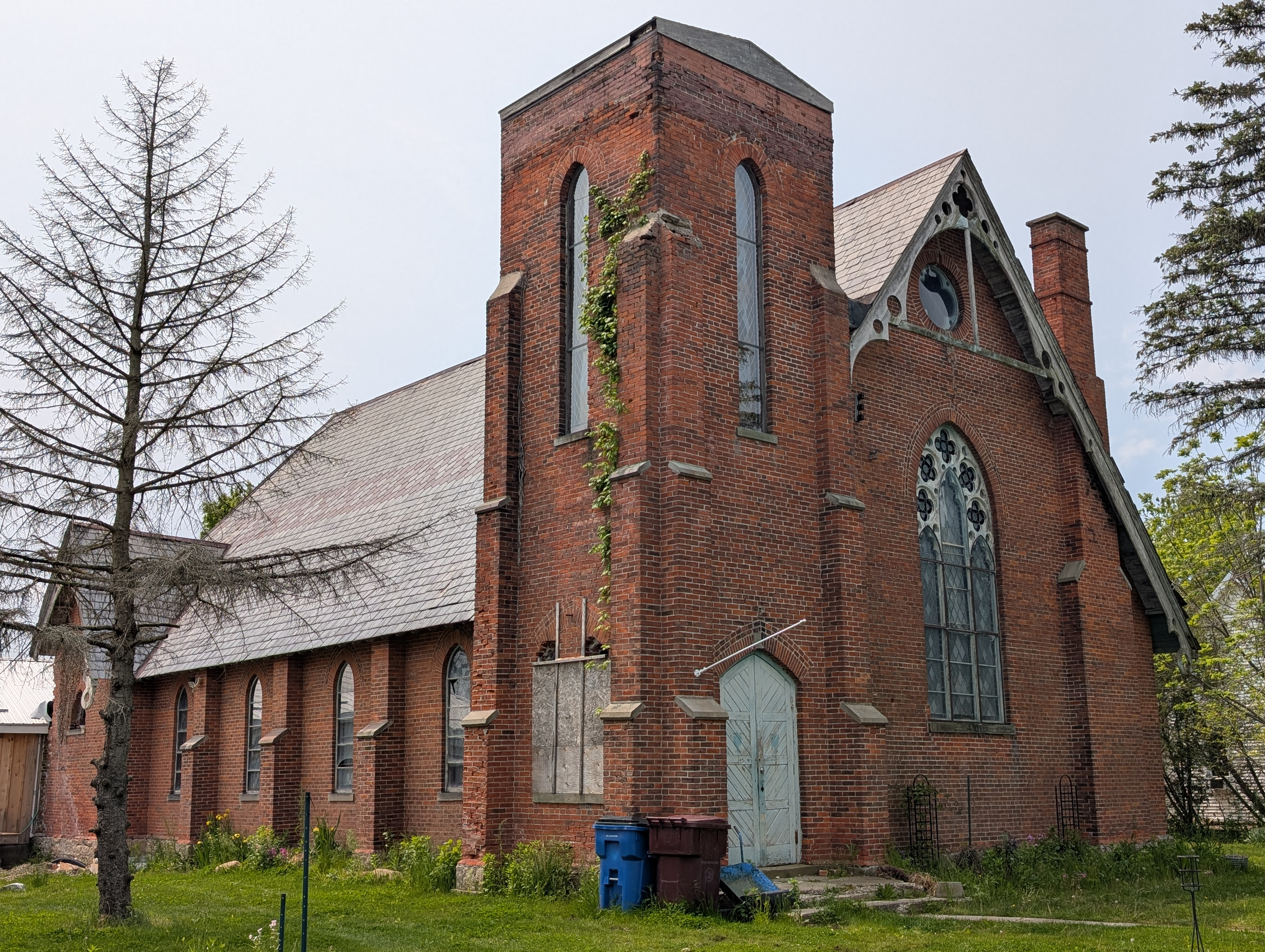
St. John's Anglican Church, built in 1878, in Morpeth, Ontario

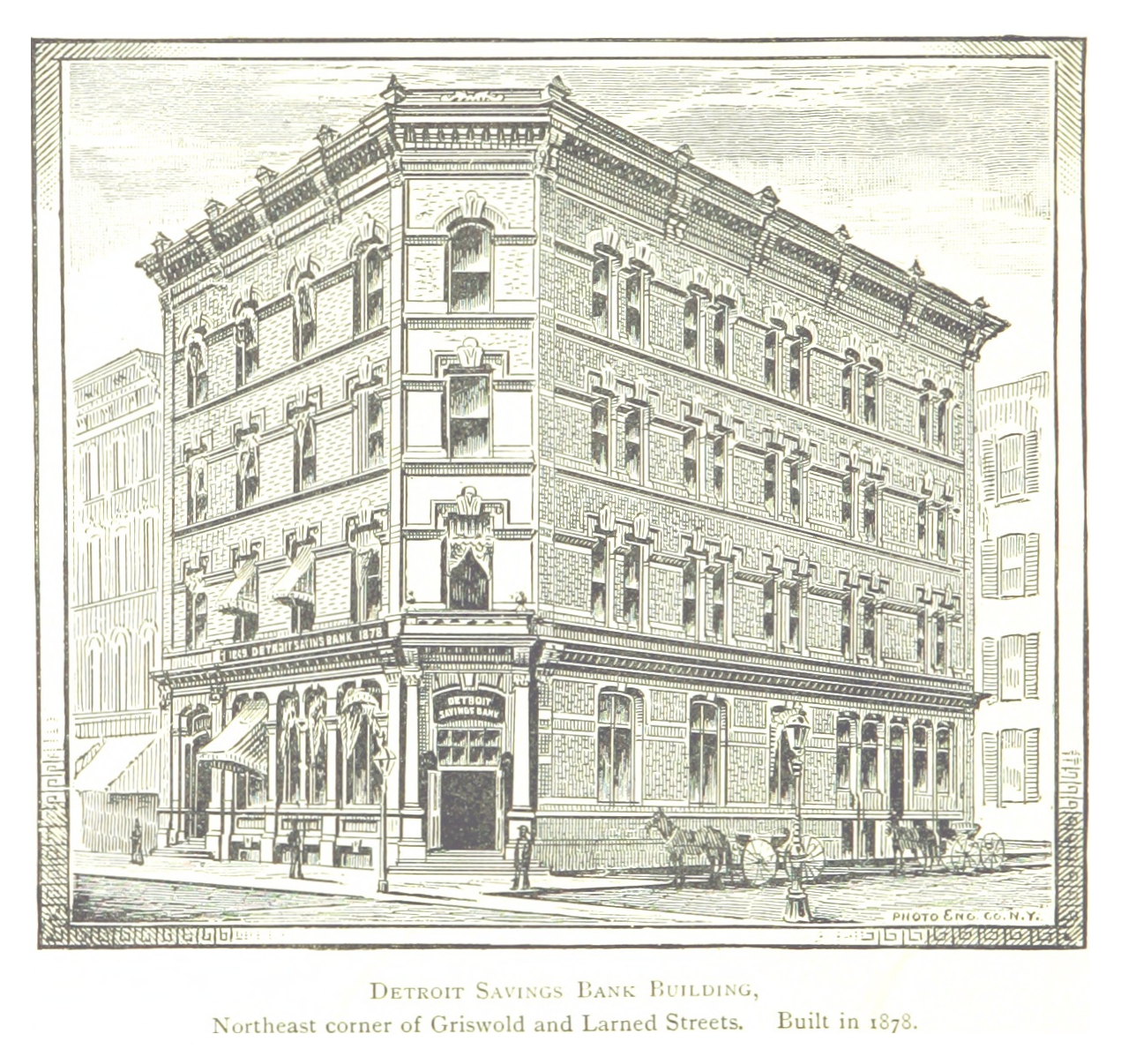
Detroit Savings Bank Building, built in 1878 and demolished in 1928.

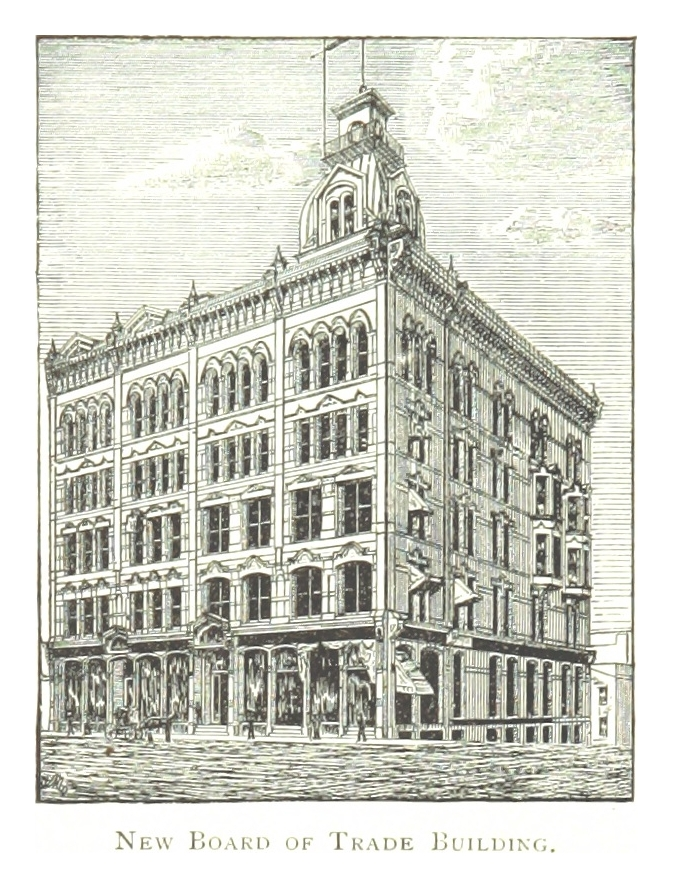
New Board of Commerce Building built in 1880 and demolished in 1940s

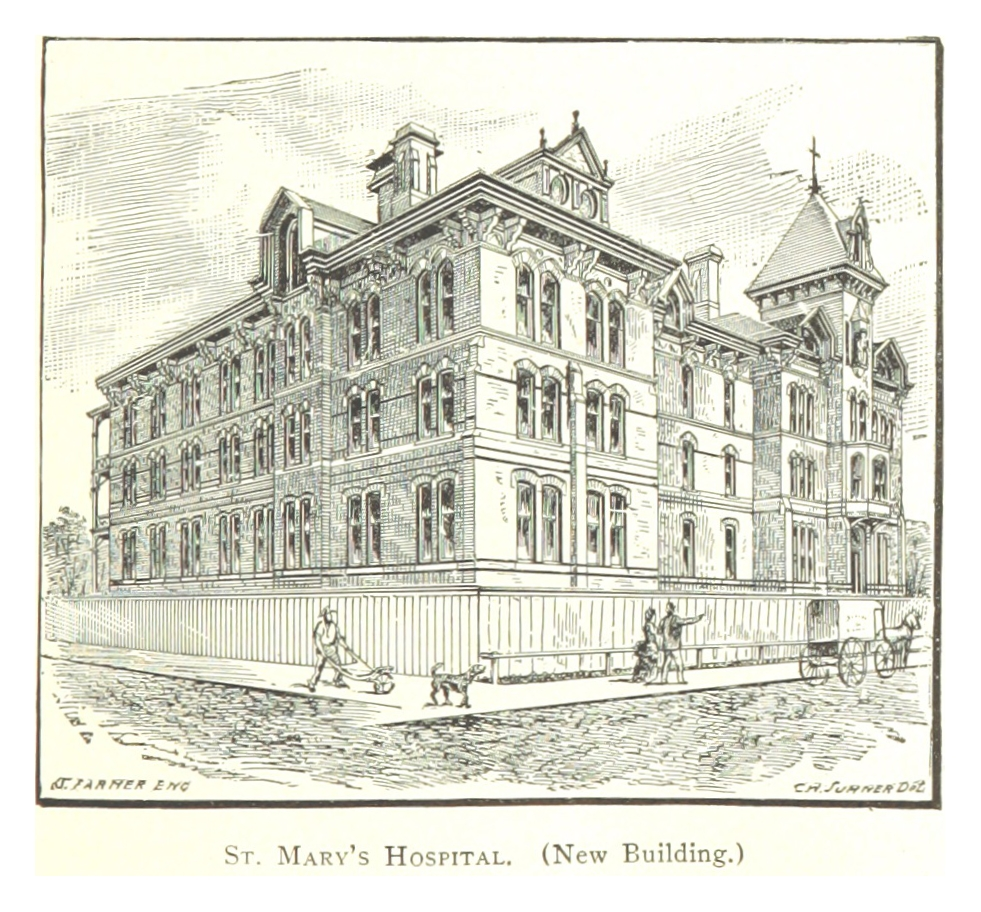
St Mary Hospital built in 1879 and demolished in 1990

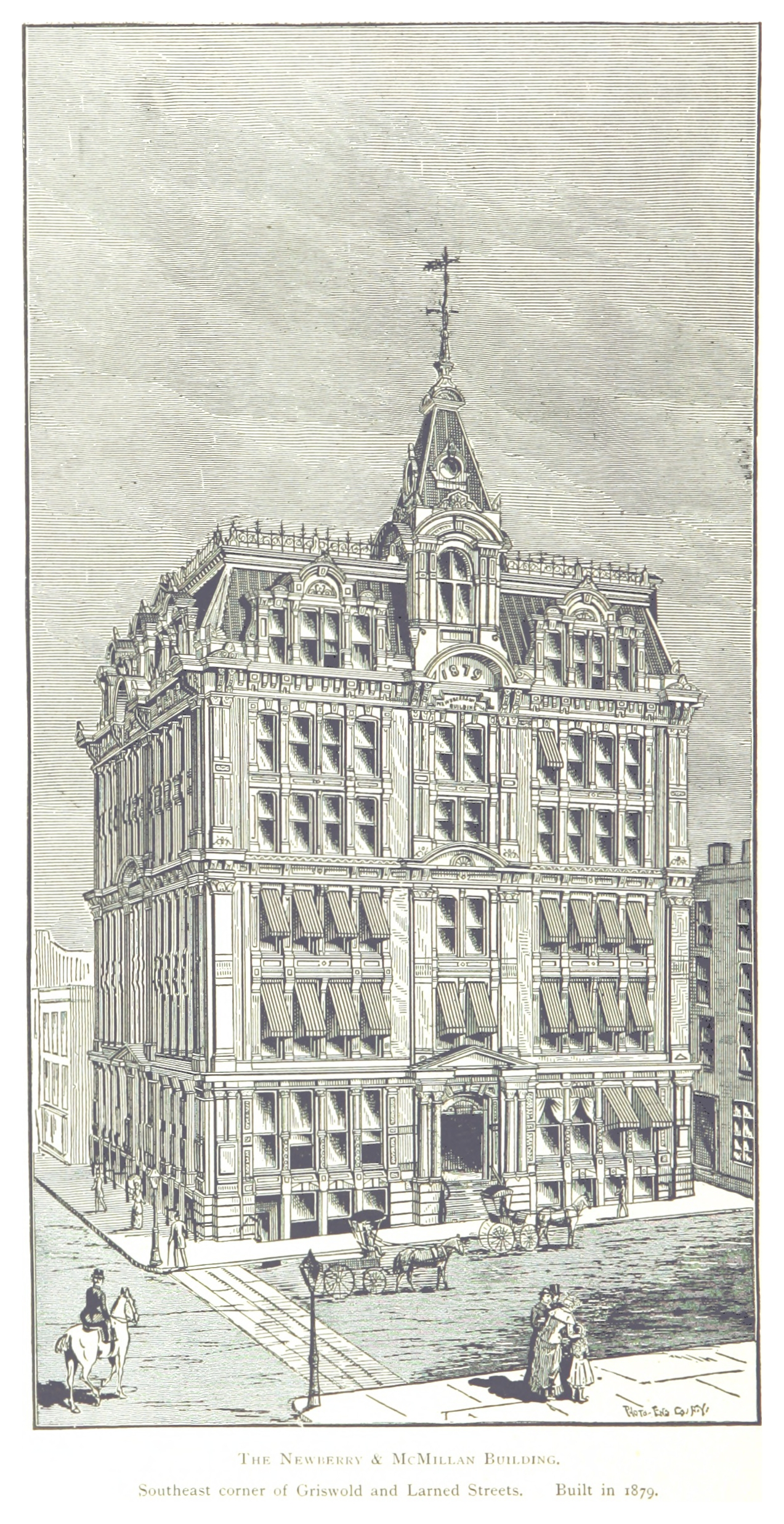
Newberry & McMillan Building built in 1879, was demolished in 1929.

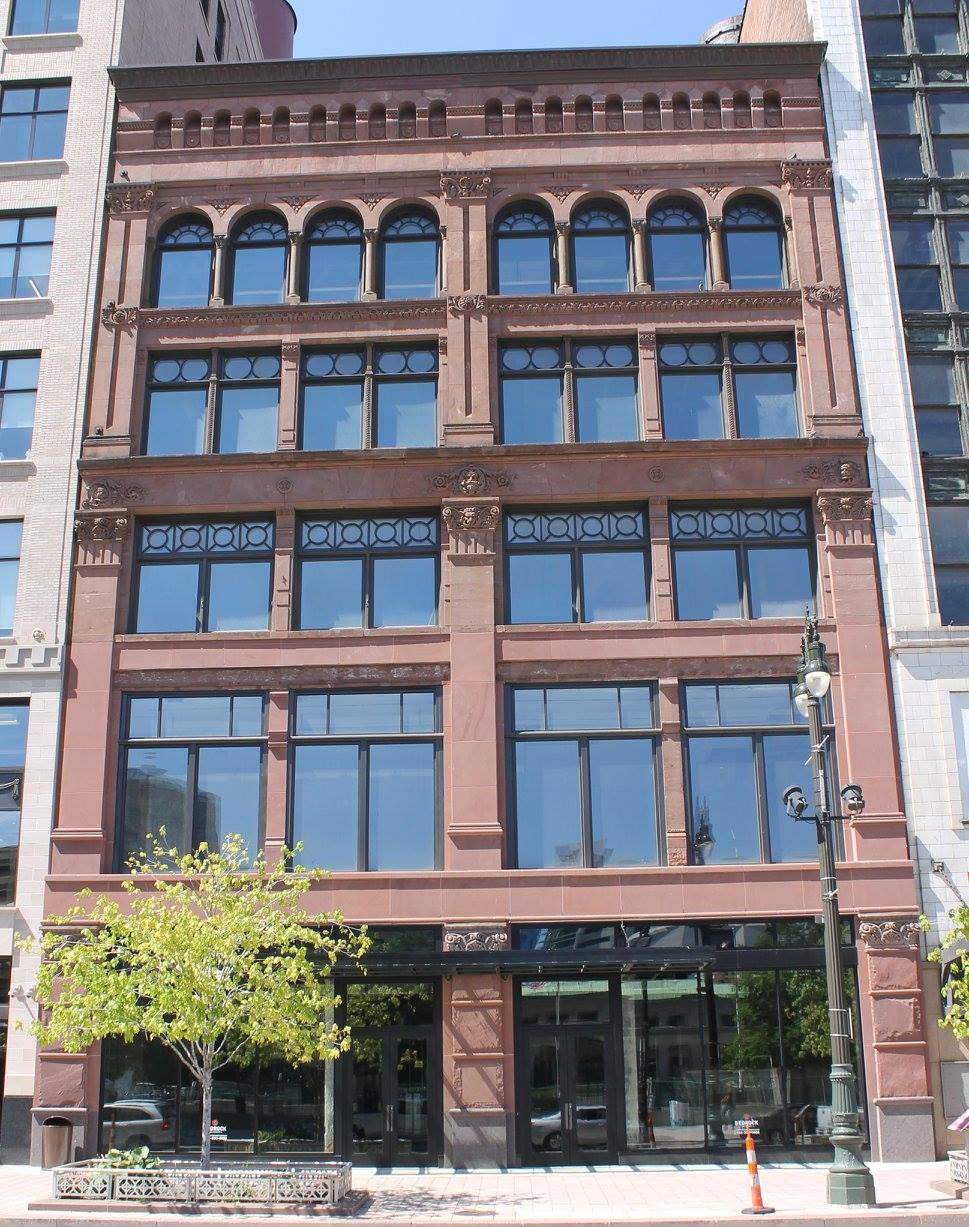
R.H Traver Building built in 1889.

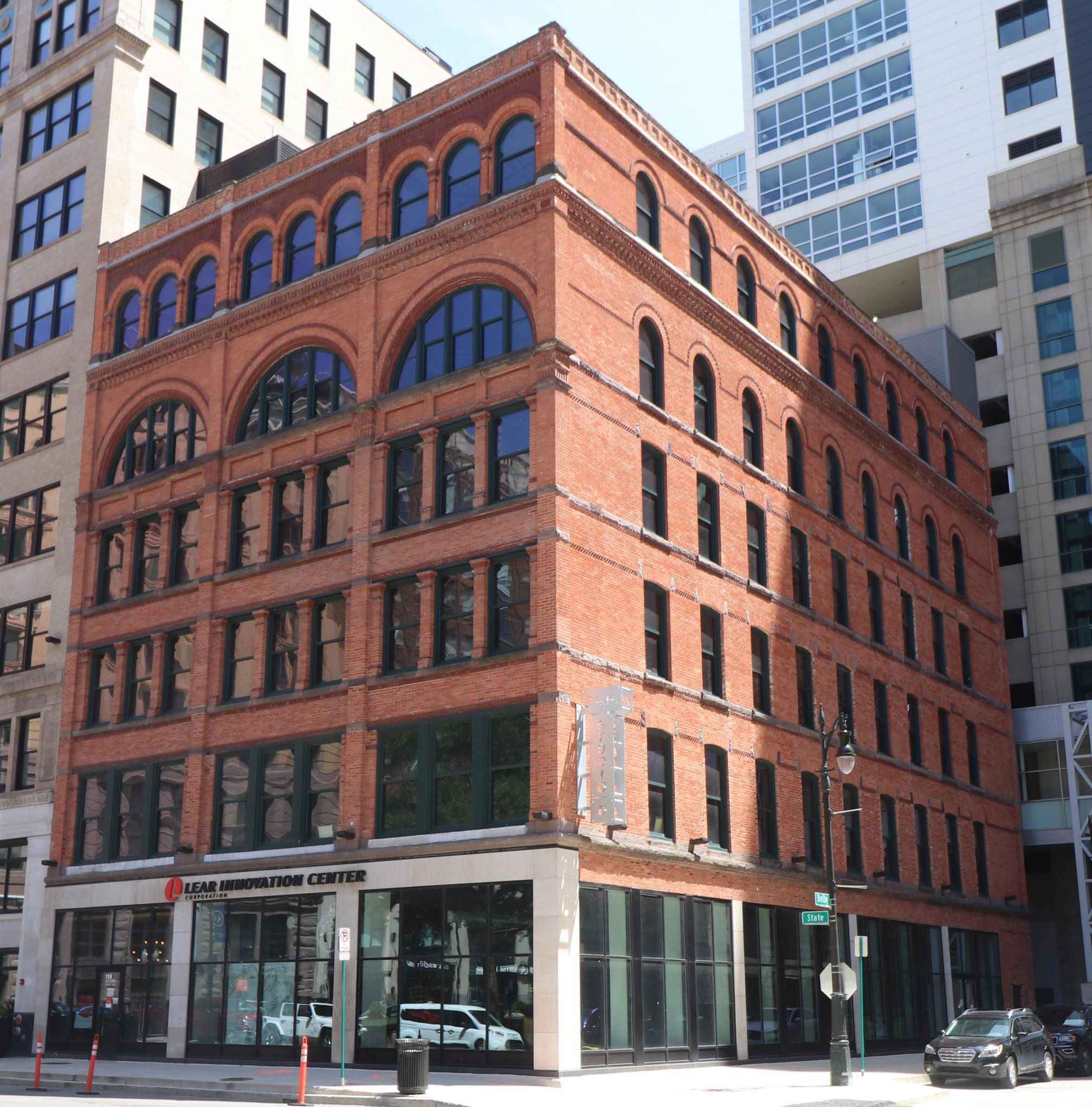
Brown Brothers Cigar Factory Building built in 1887.

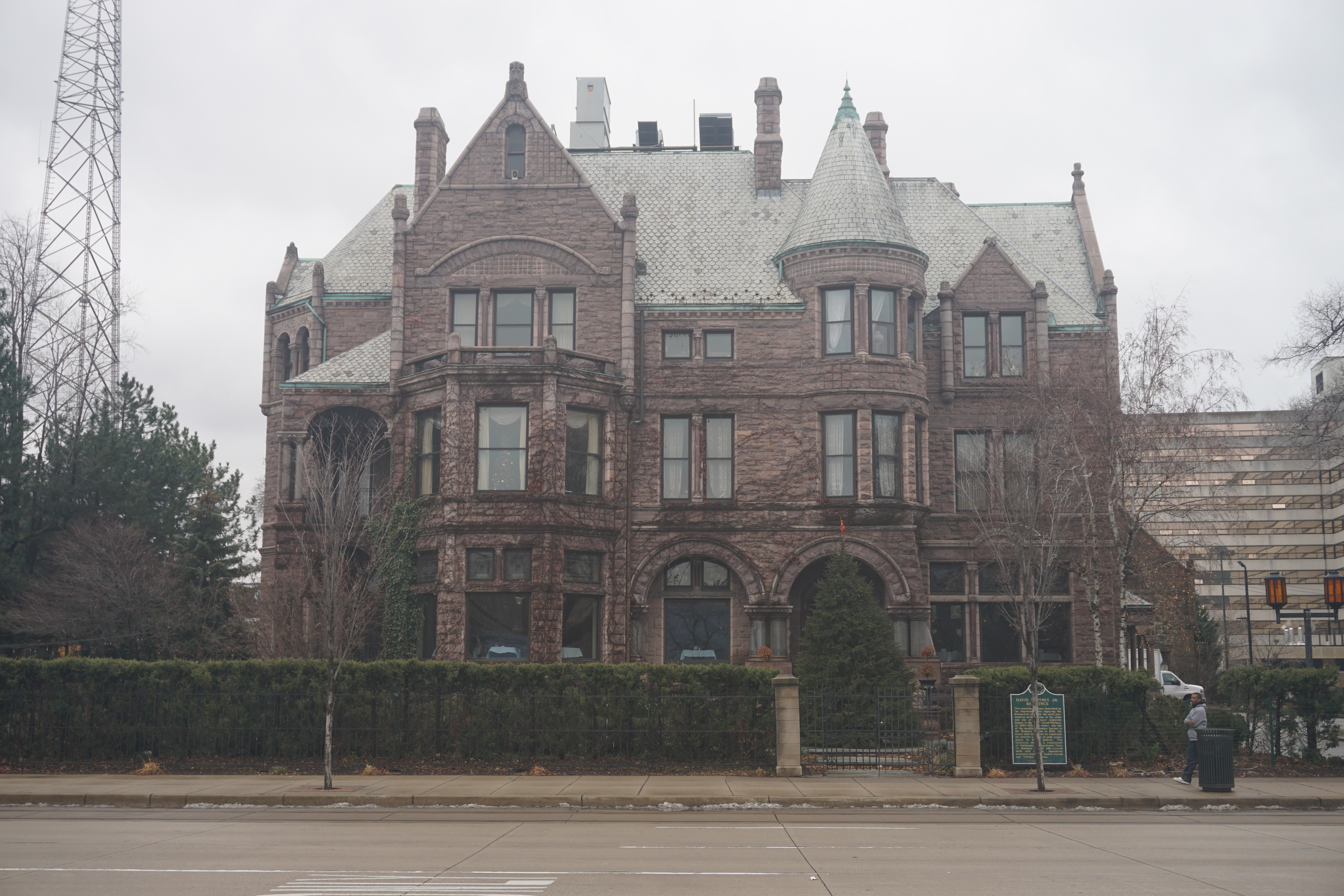
David Whitney Jr Residence built in 1894.

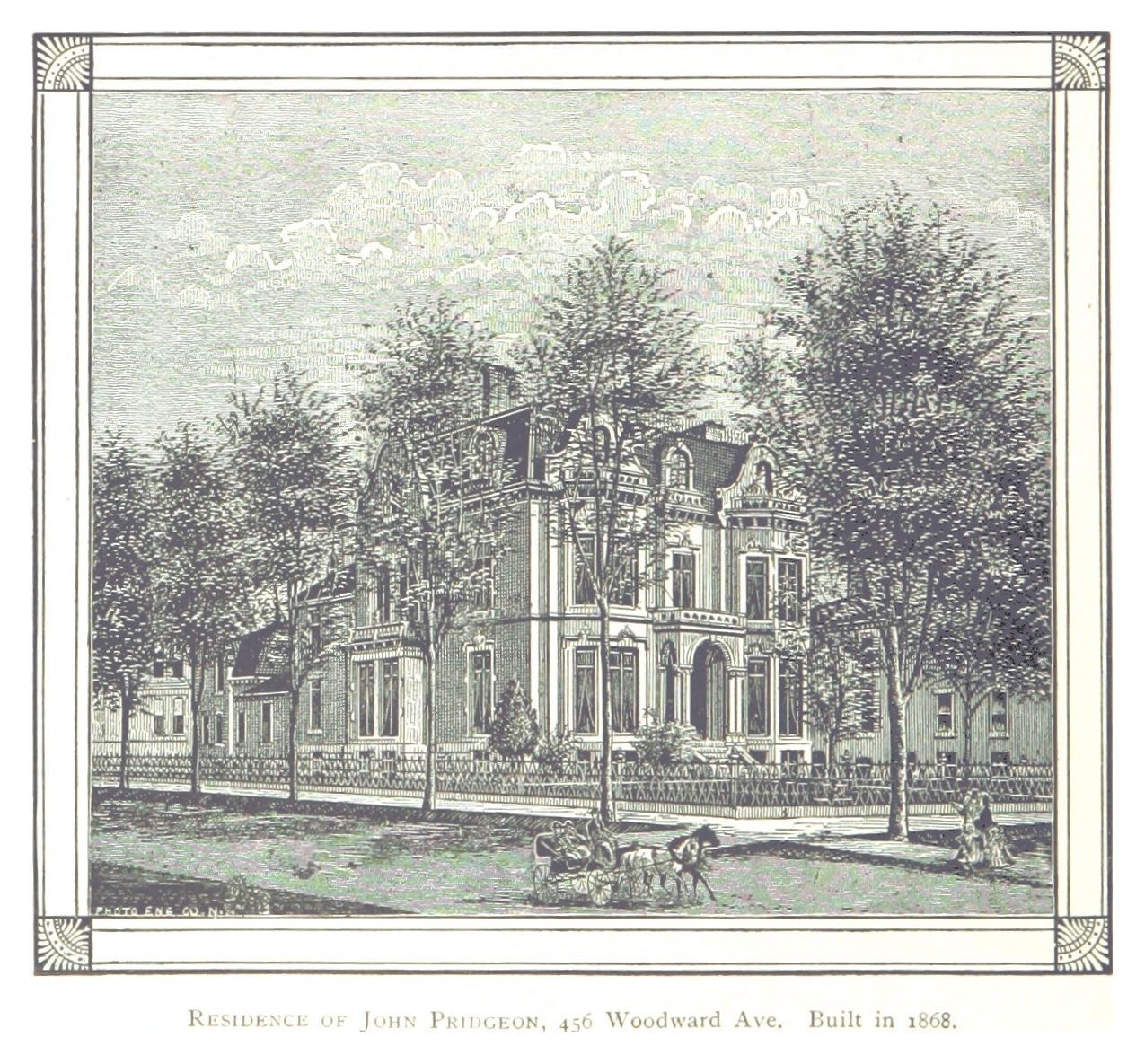
John Pridgeon residence, built in 1868, in 2666 Woodward Avenue.

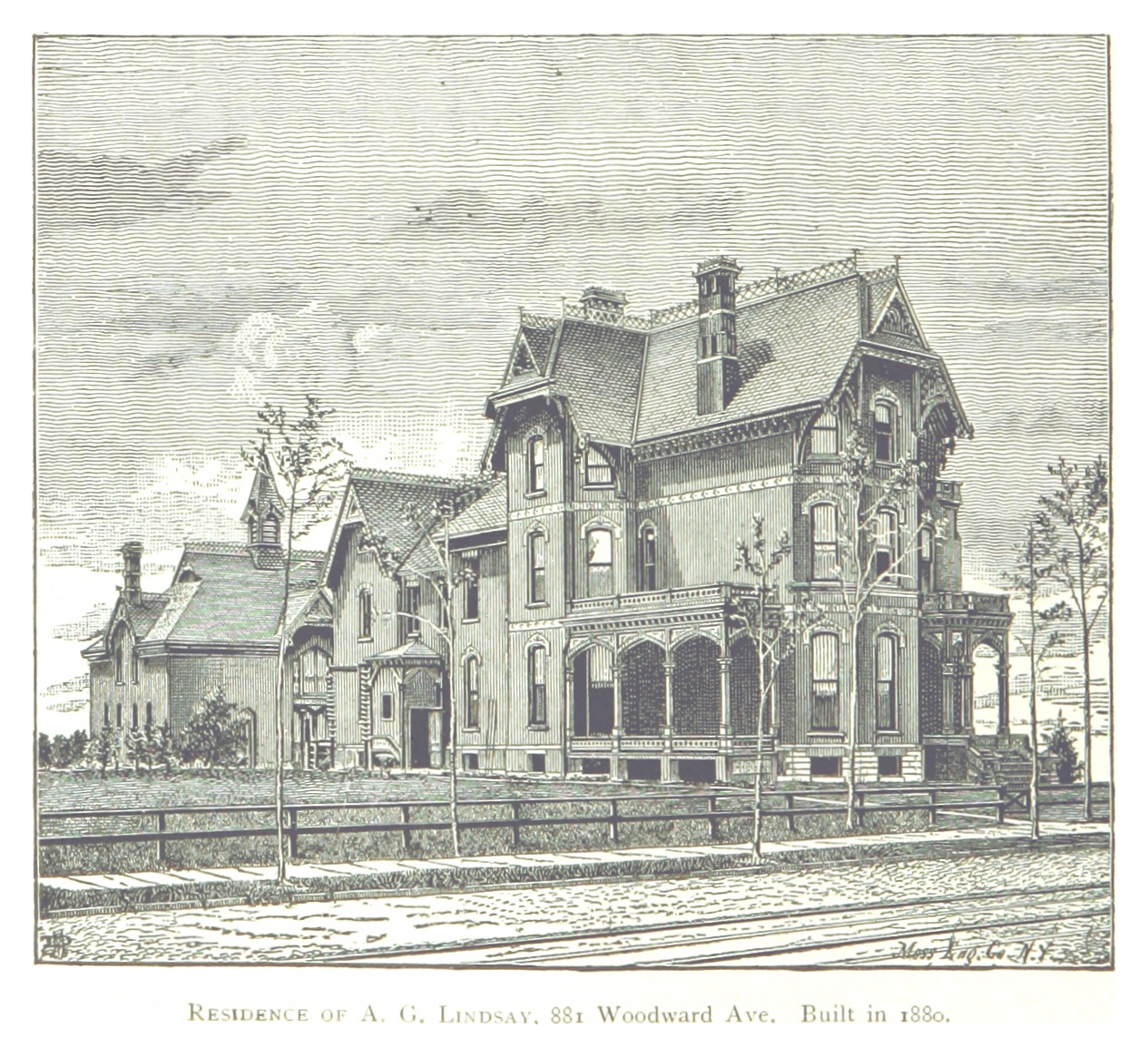
Archibald G. Lindsay residence, built in 1880, in 4639 Woodward avenue.

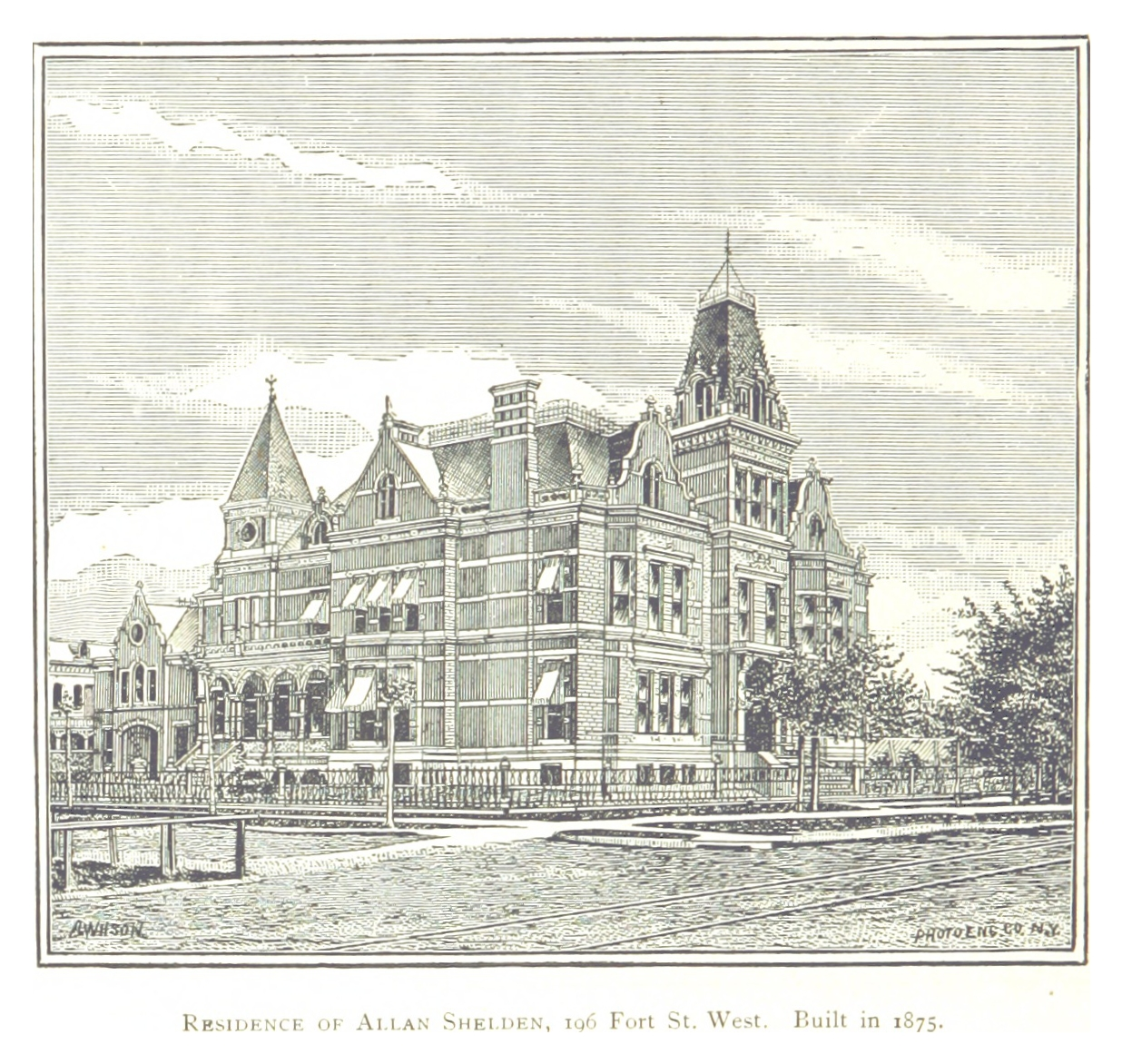
Allan Shelden residence, built in 1875, in 630 W Fort street.

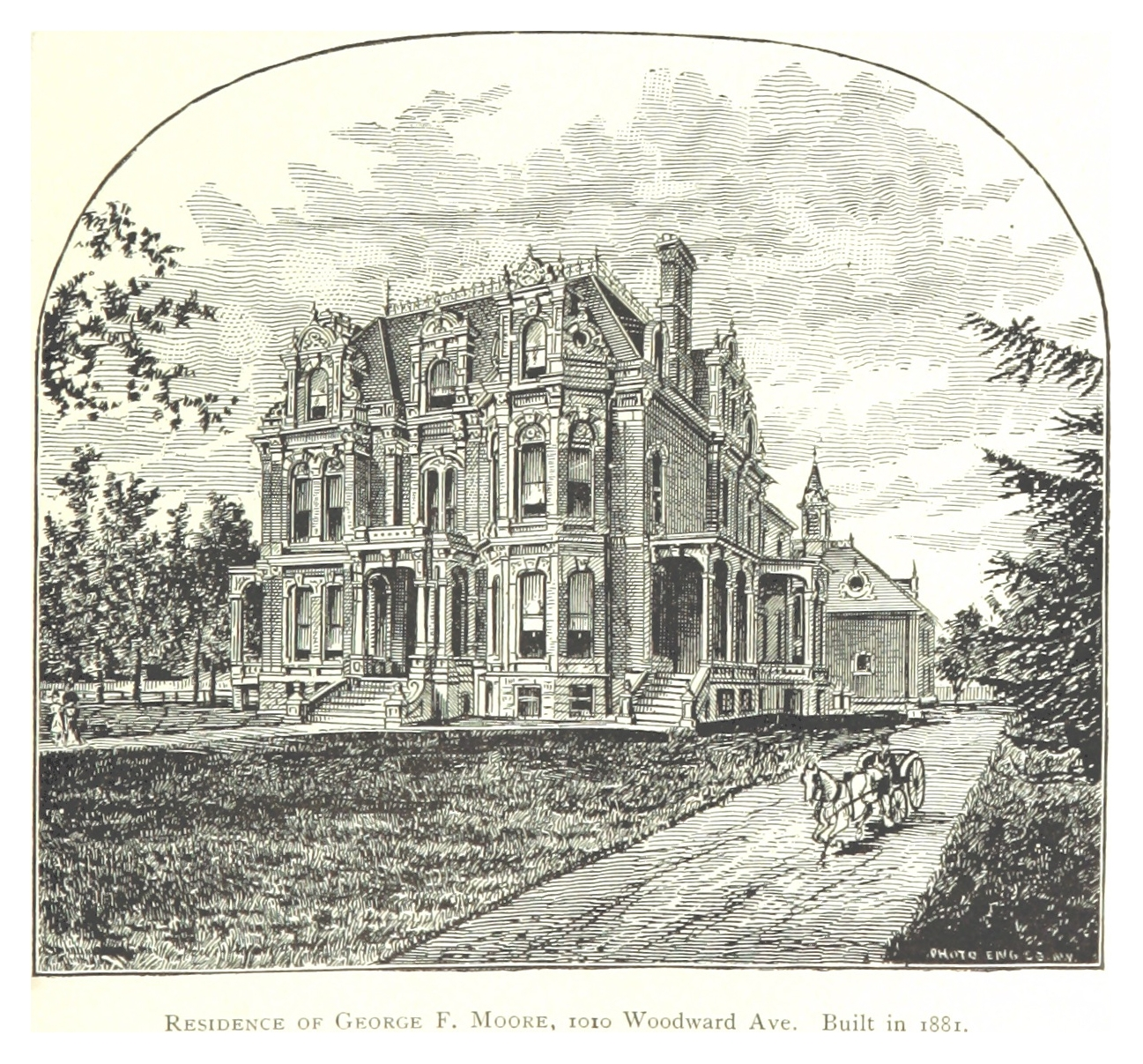
George F Moore residence, built in 1881, in 5601 Woodward Avenue.

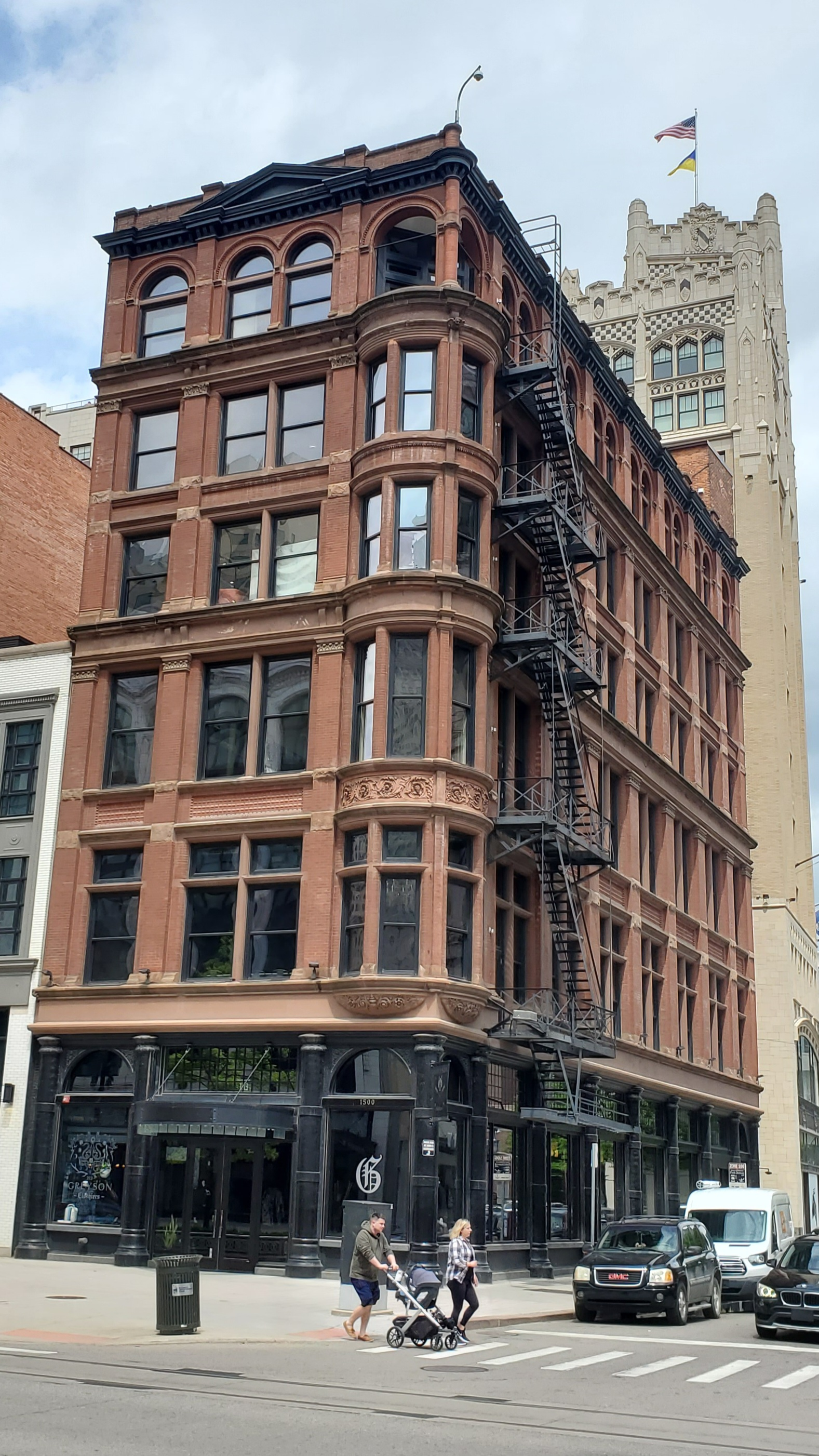
The Wright-Kay Building, built in 1891, in 1500 Woodward

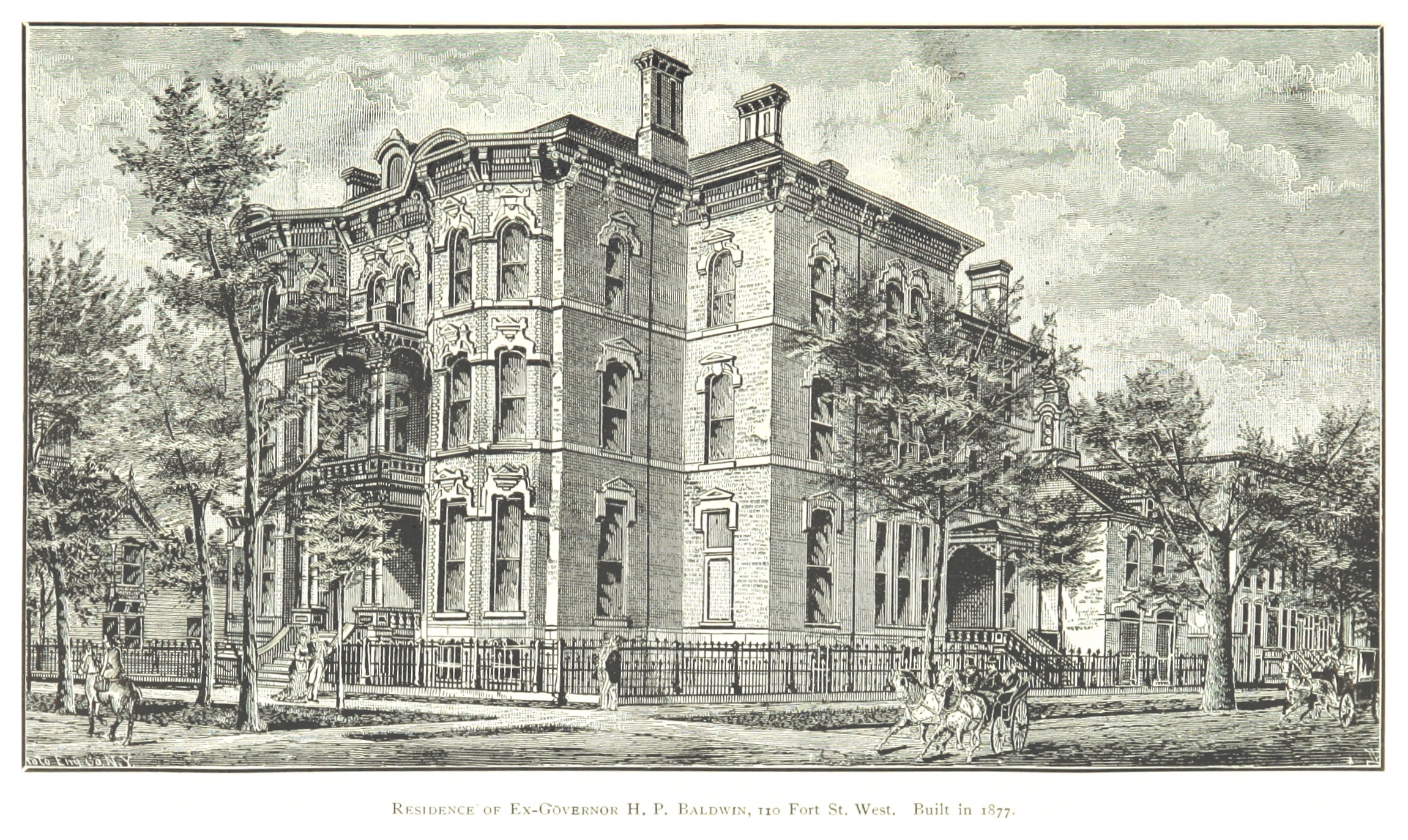
Henry P Baldwin residence, built in 1877, in 410 W Fort street. Was demolished in 1930s.

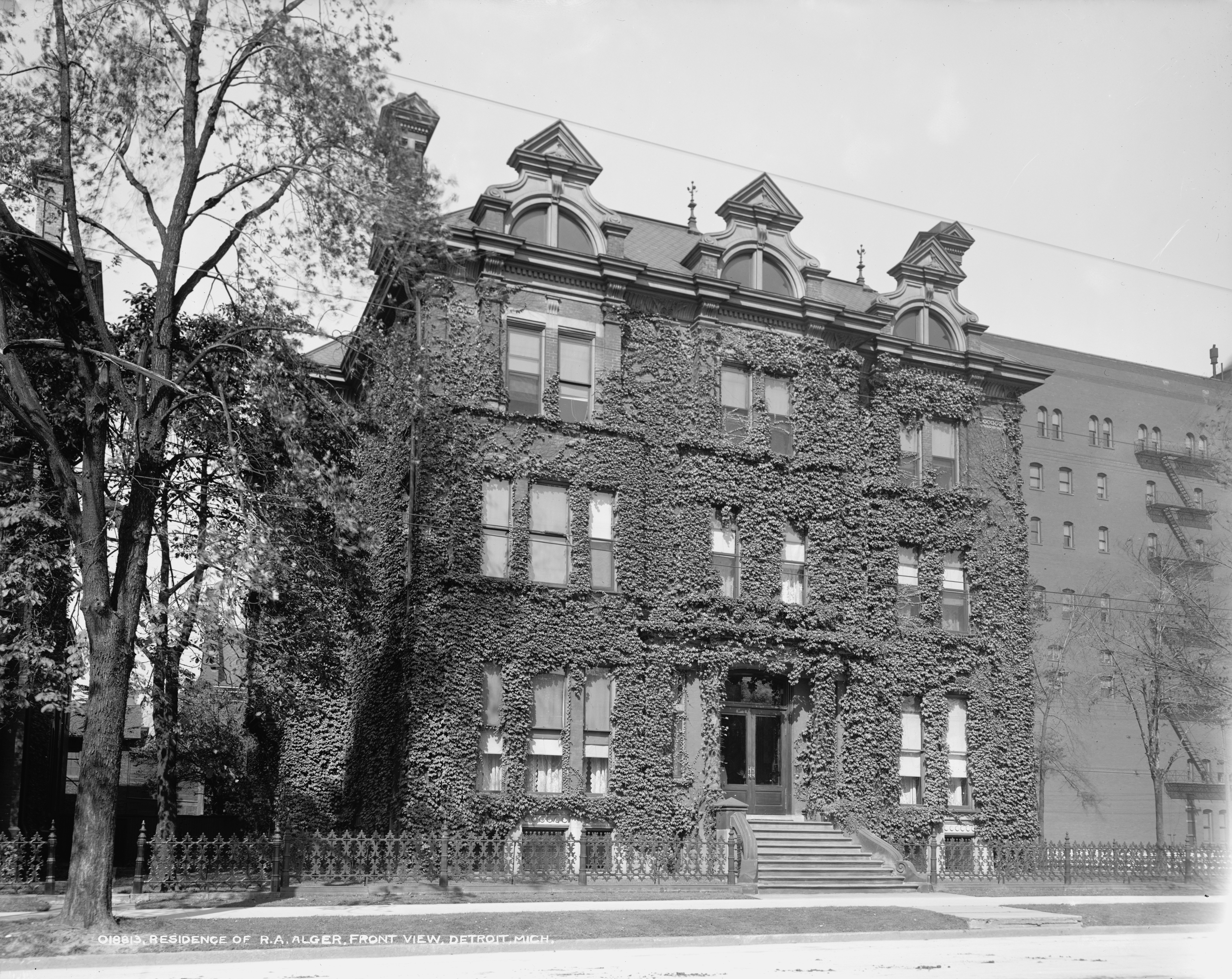
The Russell A Alger Residence, built in 1885 on 500 W Fort Street, was demolished in 1930s

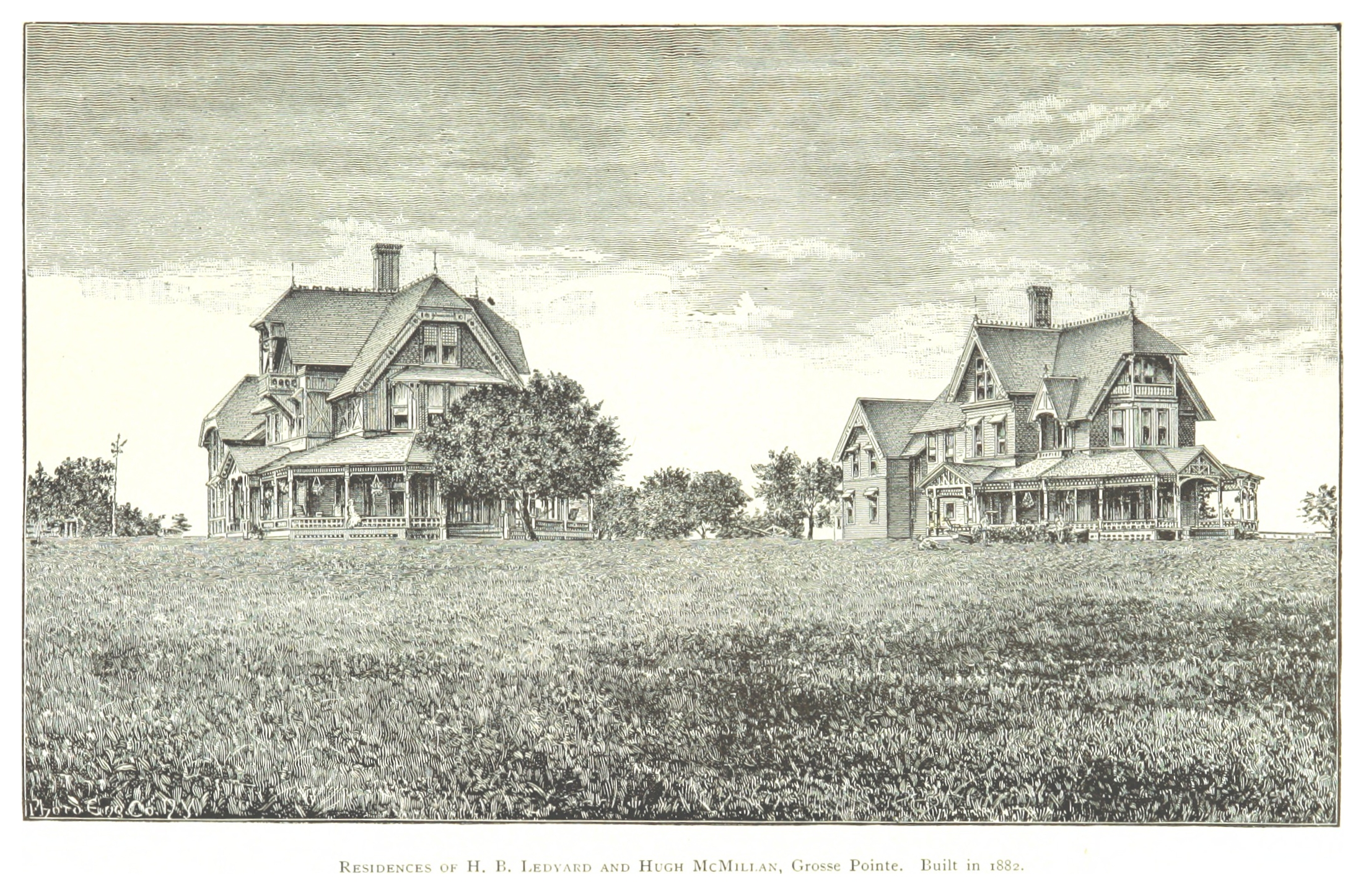
Residences of Hugh McMillan and H.B Ledyard (Originally John S Newberry and James McMillan) built in 1875 ,99 Lake Shore Drive Grosse Pointe Farms, MI. Demolished in 1910s

== See also ==
- Architecture of metropolitan Detroit
