= Wright–Kay Building =

Building

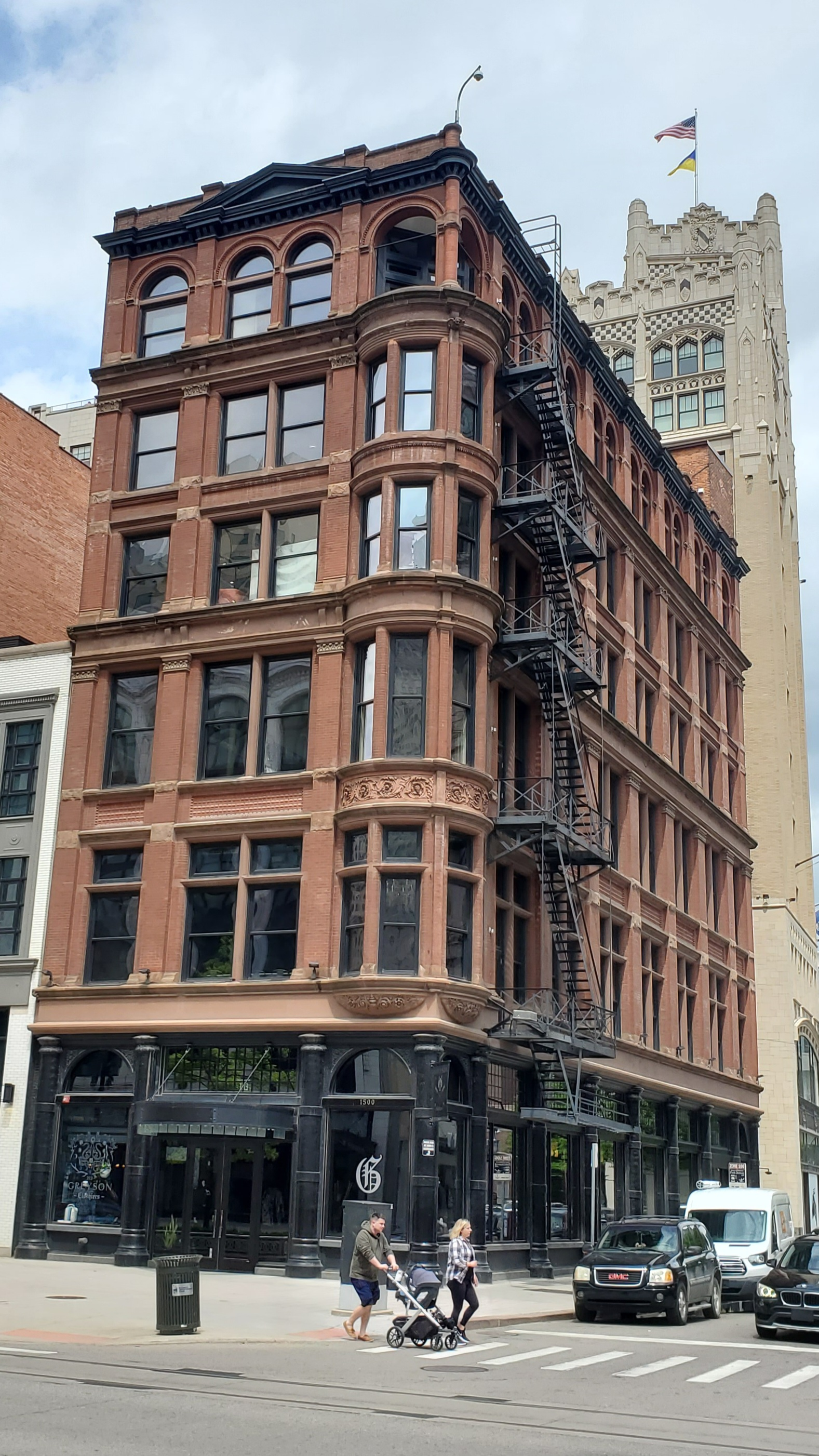
- The building in 2022
- Interactive map of the Wright–Kay Building area
- Alternative names: Schwankovsky Temple of Music

General information
- Status: Completed
- Type: Office
- Location: 1500 Woodward Avenue; Detroit, Michigan
- Coordinates: 42°20′6.5″N 83°2′57″W
- Completed: 1891
- Owner: Bedrock Detroit

Technical details
- Floor count: 6

Design and construction
- Architect: Gordon W. Lloyd

The Wright–Kay Building, originally known as the Schwankovsky Temple of Music, is one of the oldest buildings in downtown Detroit, Michigan. It is located at 1500 Woodward Avenue, at the corner of Woodward and John R. Street, in proximity to the Lower Woodward Avenue Historic District. The building was listed on the State of Michigan's Historical Register in 1980 as #P25241.

== History and description ==
The building, designed by Gordon W. Lloyd, was constructed for the F. J. Schwankovsky Company, a retailer of musical instruments. It was completed in 1891, and sat on the growing fringe of Detroit's Woodward Avenue, between Grand Circus Park and Campus Martius Park. The Schwankovsky Company went out of business a couple of decades after the building opened; subsequently, from 1920 to 1978, the structure was occupied by the Wright Kay jewelry firm. Its current use includes a clothing store on the first floor, a restaurant on the second floor and residential units above.

The Wright–Kay is a Queen Anne style building with Romanesque accents, faced with brick and brownstone trimmings. A corner turret extends from the second to the fifth floor; the second floor of the structure contains a one-time concert ballroom. The building was erected with a cast iron frame, and was among the first ones in Detroit featuring an electrical elevator.

In 2013, the original wood windows in the building, many of which had an etched design containing the initials WK, were all thrown out and replaced with replacement aluminum windows by the owner, Bedrock Management, all without gaining the needed approval of the Detroit Historic District Commission.
