= Brush Park =

- Woodward East Historic District
- U.S. National Register of Historic Places
- U.S. Historic district
- Michigan State Historic Site
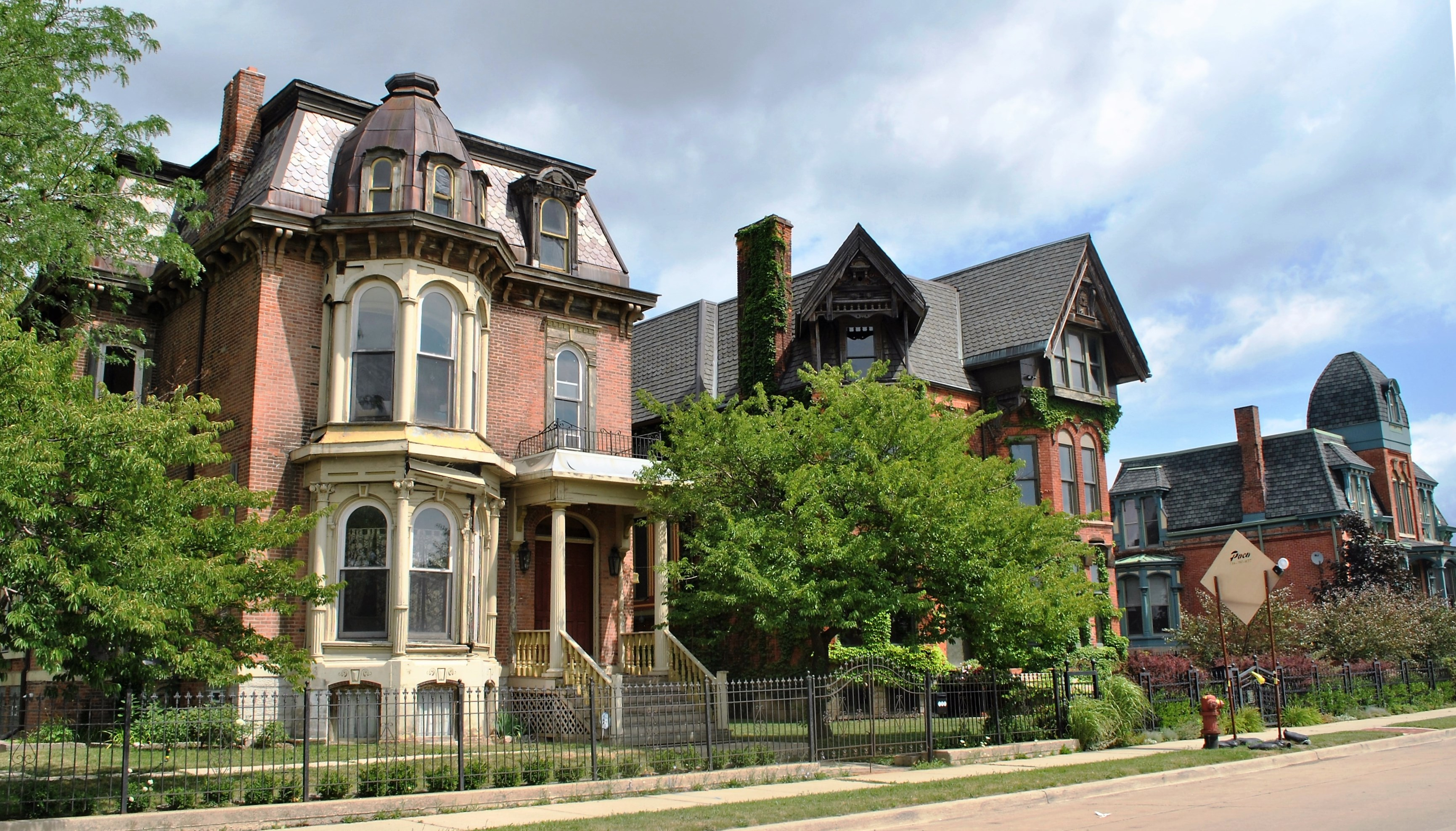
- Streetscape on Edmund Place
- Interactive map
- Location: Detroit, Michigan, U.S.
- Coordinates: 42°20′43″N 83°3′9″W
- Architect: Henry T Brush, Gordon W Lloyd, Mortimer L Smith, Julius Hess, Alamon C Varney, John V Smith, Albert Kahn.
- Architectural style: Late Victorian, French Renaissance Revival, Second Empire, Italianate
- NRHP reference No.: 75000973

Significant dates
- Added to NRHP: January 21, 1975
- Designated MSHS: September 17, 1974

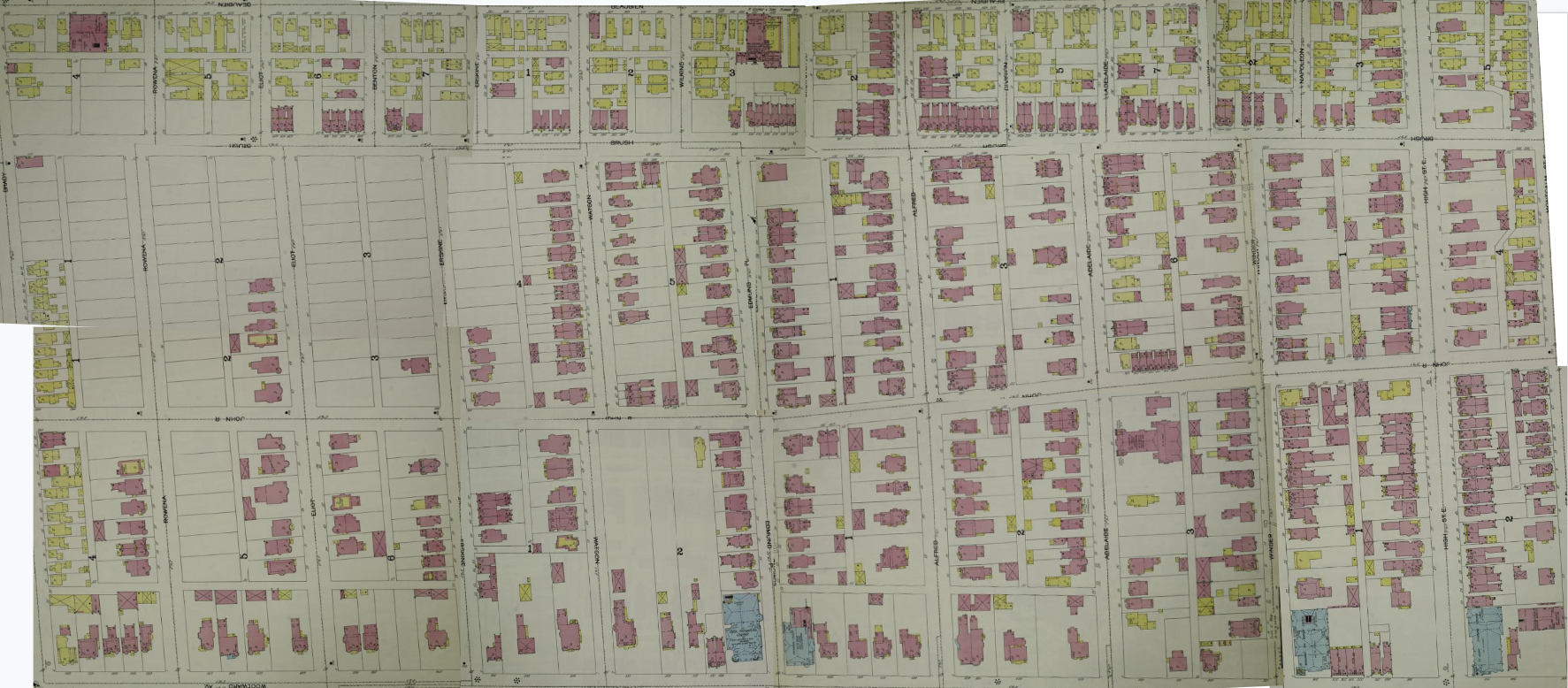
Brush Park map made from piecing together smaller maps dated 1897, obtained from the Library of Congress website.

The Brush Park Historic District is a neighborhood located in Detroit, Michigan. It is bounded by Mack Avenue on the north, Woodward Avenue on the west, Beaubien Street on the east, and the Fisher Freeway on the south. The Woodward East Historic District, a smaller historic district completely encompassed by the larger Brush Park neighborhood, is located on Alfred, Edmund, and Watson Streets, from Brush Street to John R. Street, and is recognized by the National Register of Historic Places.

Originally part of a French ribbon farm, Brush Park was developed beginning in the 1850s as an upscale residential neighborhood for Detroit's elite citizens by entrepreneur Edmund Askin Brush. Dozens of Victorian mansions were built there during the final decades of the nineteenth century, and Brush Park was nicknamed "Little Paris" due to its elegant architecture. The neighborhood's heyday didn't last long, however: by the early twentieth century most of is affluent residents started moving to more modern, quieter districts, and Brush Park was quickly populated by members of Detroit's fast-growing working class. Severely affected by depopulation, blight and crime during the 1970s and 1980s, the neighborhood is currently experiencing restorations of its historic buildings and luring new residents.

== History ==
=== Early years ===
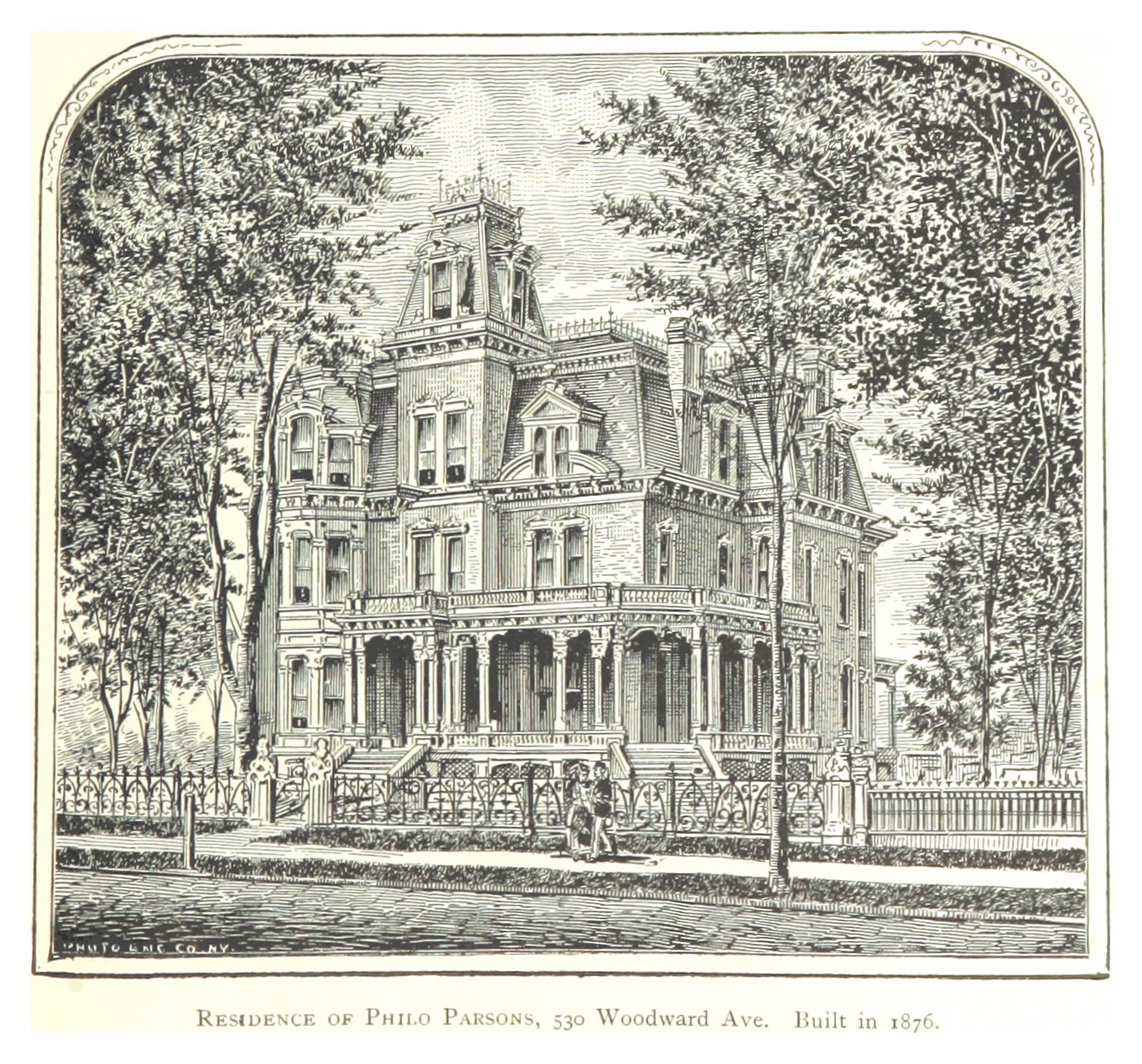
The Philo Parsons residence, designed by architect Elijah E. Myers and completed in 1876, was located at the south corner of Woodward Avenue and Watson Street. Was demolished for the 1936 Woodward widening.

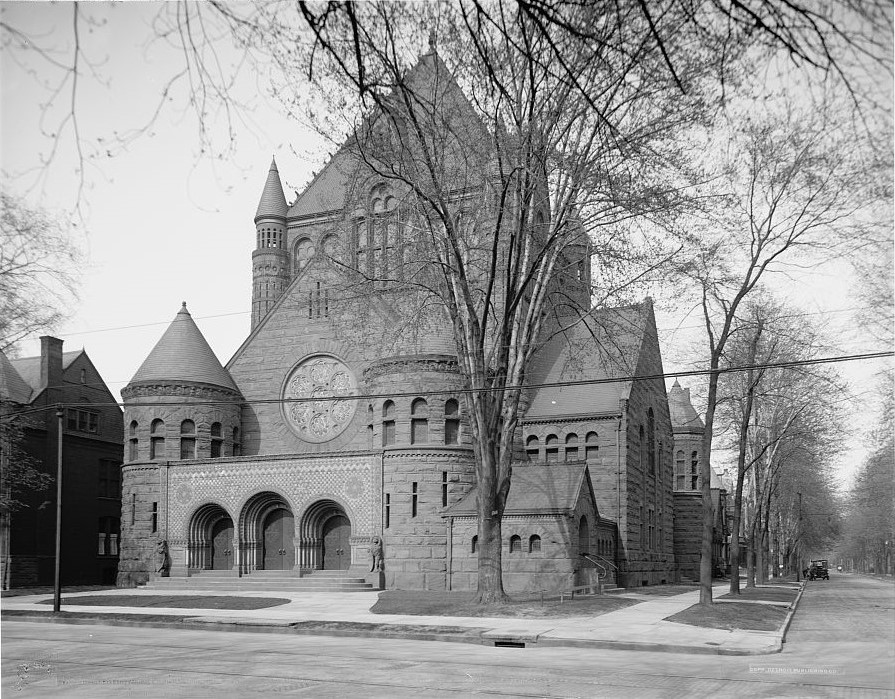
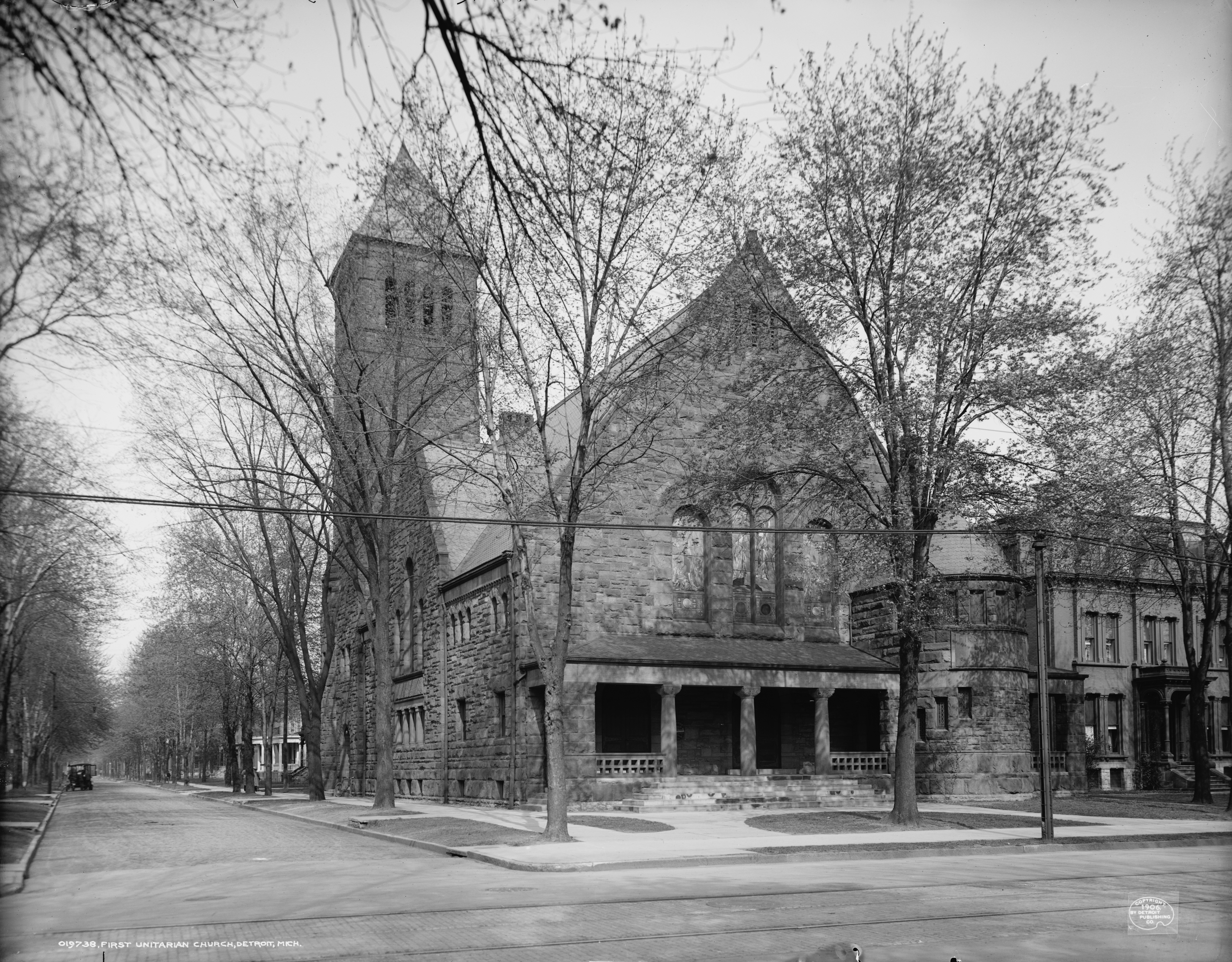
First Presbyterian Church (left) and First Unitarian Church, c. 1906

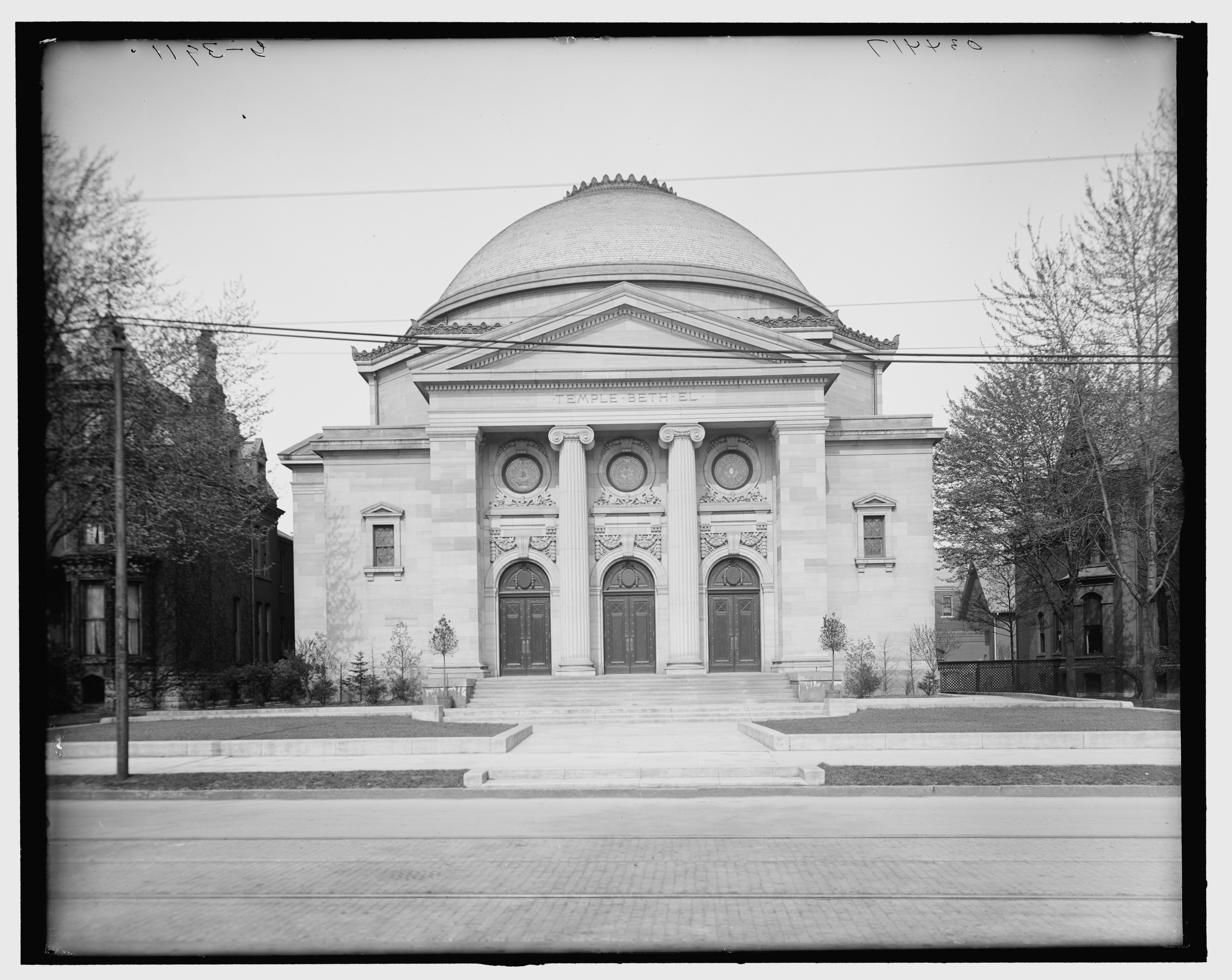
Temple Beth-El, c. 1905

The land now occupied by the Brush Park district was originally part of a ribbon farm dating back to the French colonial period, initially conceded by Charles de la Boische, Marquis de Beauharnois to Laurence Eustache Gamelin for military services on May 1, 1747. The farm had a frontage of two arpents (about 386 feet) on the Detroit River, and extended back into the interior eighty arpents; it was bounded on the west by the Commons (Domaine du Roy), and on the east by the farm of Jean Baptiste Beaubien. After the death of its second owner, Jacques Pilet, the farm was acquired by the prominent Barthe family, and in the late eighteenth century John Askin, an Irish fur trader and land speculator, obtained it through marriage with Marie-Archange Barthe. In 1802, Askin's daughter Adelaide married Elijah Brush, a Vermont lawyer who would soon become Detroit's second mayor from its first incorporation; on October 31, 1806, Elijah purchased the farm – legally designated as "Private Claim 1" – for $6000.

Beginning in the 1850s, entrepreneur Edmund Askin Brush, son of Elijah, began developing his family's property, located conveniently close to downtown, into a neighborhood for Detroit's elite citizens. The first street, named after Colonel John Winder, was opened in 1852; the other streets followed soon afterwards (Adelaide in 1853, Alfred in 1869, Edmund in 1867) and were mainly named after members of the Brush family. The area was developed with care: the land directly facing Woodward Avenue was subdivided into large and expensive lots, soon occupied by religious buildings and opulent mansions rivaling those built along East Jefferson Avenue and West Fort Street, while the land to the east was partitioned into relatively smaller, fifty feet wide parcels. Severe restrictions required the construction of high-end, elegant mansions, giving a uniform and exclusive character to the neighborhood. In the late 19th century, Brush Park became known as the "Little Paris of the Midwest."

Architects who designed these mansions included Julius Hess, Henry T. Brush, George D. Mason, Gordon W Lloyd, Elijah E Myers, Martin A Edwards George W. Nettleton, and Albert Kahn. Homes were built in Brush Park beginning in the 1860s and peaking in the 1870s and 1880s; one of the last homes built was constructed in 1906 by Albert Kahn for his personal use. Other early residents of Brush Park included lumber baron David Whitney Jr. and his daughter, Grace Whitney Evans; businessman Dexter M. Ferry; Joseph L. Hudson, founder of the eponymous department store; Fulton Iron Works founder Delos Rice; lumber baron Lucien S. Moore; banker Frederick Butler; merchant John P. Fiske; Dime Savings Bank president William Livingstone Jr.; and dry goods manufacturer Ransom Gillis.

In the 1890s the character of the subdivision began to change, as many prominent members of the local German Jewish community moved to Brush Park. This period of the neighborhood's history is recorded by the neoclassical Temple Beth-El, designed by Albert Kahn for the Reform Congregation and constructed in 1902. Around the same time, Brush Park saw the construction of its first apartment buildings. Some of the neighborhood's earliest examples of this type of structure were the Luben Apartments, built in 1901 by architect Edwin W. Gregory and demolished in 2010, and the Alfred Apartments, built in 1903 by architect Alamon C. Varney and demolished in 1930s. These apartments featured large and sumptuous units, and their design blended with those of the surrounding mansions; however, the construction of apartment buildings undoubtedly represented a decrease in the quality of Brush Park's building stock.

=== Decline ===
The neighborhood began to decline at the turn of the 20th century, when the advent of streetcars and then automobiles allowed prosperous citizens to live farther from downtown: early residents moved out, notably to up-and-coming districts such as Indian Village and Boston–Edison, and Brush Park became less fashionable. The Woodward Avenue frontage rapidly lost its residential character, as the lavish mansions were demolished to make way for commercial buildings; those that survived were demolished in the 1935 Woodward widening. Throughout the subdivision, homes were converted to apartments or rooming houses – often with the construction of two- and three-story rear additions – to accommodate workers of the booming automobile industry, and dozens of structures were razed for surface parking lots. By 1921, all of the homes on Alfred Street were apartments or rooming houses.

By the 1930s many African Americans had moved into the area; as a result, Brush Park became home to a vibrant black community, together with the nearby Black Bottom–Paradise Valley area. African American institutions located in Brush Park included St. Peter Claver, the first Catholic parish for African Americans in Detroit, established in 1914 in the former St. Mary's Episcopal church at Beaubien and Eliot; the Most Worshipful Mt. Sinai Grand Lodge, a black masonic lodge located at 312 Watson; and the Mercy General Hospital and Clinic. Mercy Hospital was the first black-owned hospital in Detroit; founded by Dr. David Northcross in 1917, it was originally located at 248 Winder Street, and later relocated to 668 Winder.

The Great Depression and the racial tensions of the 1940s (part of the 1943 race riot took place in the streets of Brush Park) led to a rapid deterioration of the neighborhood. Longtime resident Russell McLauchlin described Brush Park's decline in the preface to his book Alfred Street (1946):

[Alfred Street] is now in what city-planners call a blighted area. The elms were long ago cut down. No representative of the old neighbor families remains. The houses, mostly standing as they stood a half-century ago, are dismal structures. Some have night-blooming grocery stores in their front yards. Some have boarded windows. All stand in bitter need of paint and repair. It is a desolate street; a scene of poverty and chop-fallen gloom; possibly of worse things.

Starting in the 1960s, many of the buildings became unoccupied and fell into disrepair; however, the neighborhood maintained much of its historical integrity, and some attempts were made to preserve it. The first serious redevelopment plan in Brush Park's history was the Woodward East Renaissance project, planned to be completed in 1976, America's bicentennial year. The ambitious plan included restoring the surviving historic mansions and erecting modern residential buildings on the empty lots, but it was left unrealized due to disorganization. The area bounded by Alfred, Brush, Watson, and John R. Streets, named Woodward East Historic District, was designated a Michigan State Historic Site on September 17, 1974, and listed on the National Register of Historic Places on January 21, 1975; the larger Brush Park Historic District, bounded by Woodward, Mack, Beaubien, and the Fisher Freeway, was established by the City of Detroit on January 23, 1980. Despite these attempts to save what was left of the neighborhood's historic character, by the 1980s Brush Park had gradually fallen into a state of "nearly total abandonment and disintegration," gaining a poor reputation as one of Detroit's most derelict areas. Abandoned buildings became targets for vandals and arsonists: as a result, dozens of structures were demolished by the city for security reasons. During the 19th century, around 300 homes were built in Brush Park, including 70 Victorian mansions; at present, about 80 original structures remain in the area. Notable buildings that were demolished include the Woodward Avenue Baptist Church (1887), destroyed by fire in 1986, and St. Patrick Catholic Church (1862), destroyed by fire in 1993.

=== Revival ===
Brush Park's revival began in the 1990s and has since accelerated. Several historic houses were stabilized and "mothballed" by the City of Detroit between 2005 and 2006, on the occasion of the Super Bowl XL played at the nearby Ford Field. New condominiums have been built in the southern part of the district, near the Fisher Freeway, and a number of the older mansions have been restored. A handful of buildings still remain in a state of complete neglect, and are threatened with demolition.

The French Renaissance style William Livingstone House (1894) on Eliot Street was one of Kahn's first commissions. The Red Cross intended to demolish the mansion, originally located west of John R. Street, to make way for their new building. Preservationists succeeded in successfully moving the Livingstone House about one block to the east. Nevertheless, after this change of position some serious structural problems concerning the house's foundations caused the gradual collapse of the building. Artist Lowell Boileau commemorated the William Livingstone House in a painting entitled Open House which he unveiled the day of its demolition September 15, 2007, underscoring preservationist efforts.

On May 10, 2014, the historic First Unitarian Church caught fire under suspicious circumstances and was consequently demolished. The building, which was designed by Donaldson and Meier and dated back to 1890, represents one of the greatest losses in Brush Park's recent history, since it was listed on the National Register of Historic Places.

=== Gallery ===
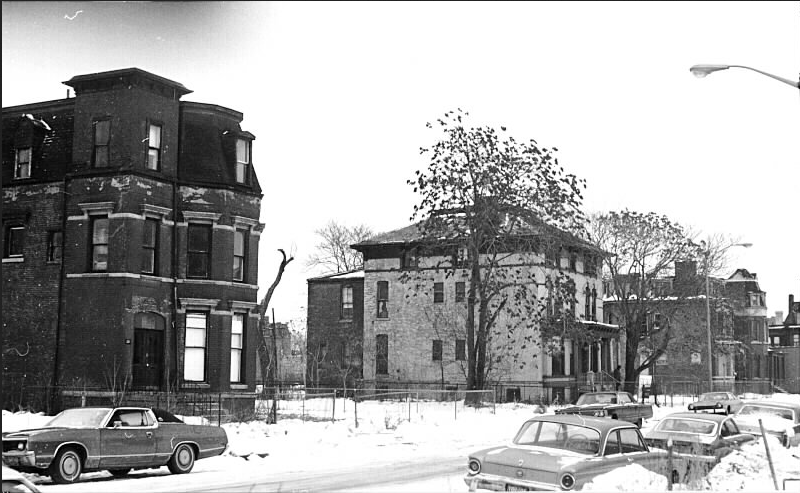
Alfred Street in the 1970s.The first house was the Thomas McGraw House built in 1874 and demolished in 2001.

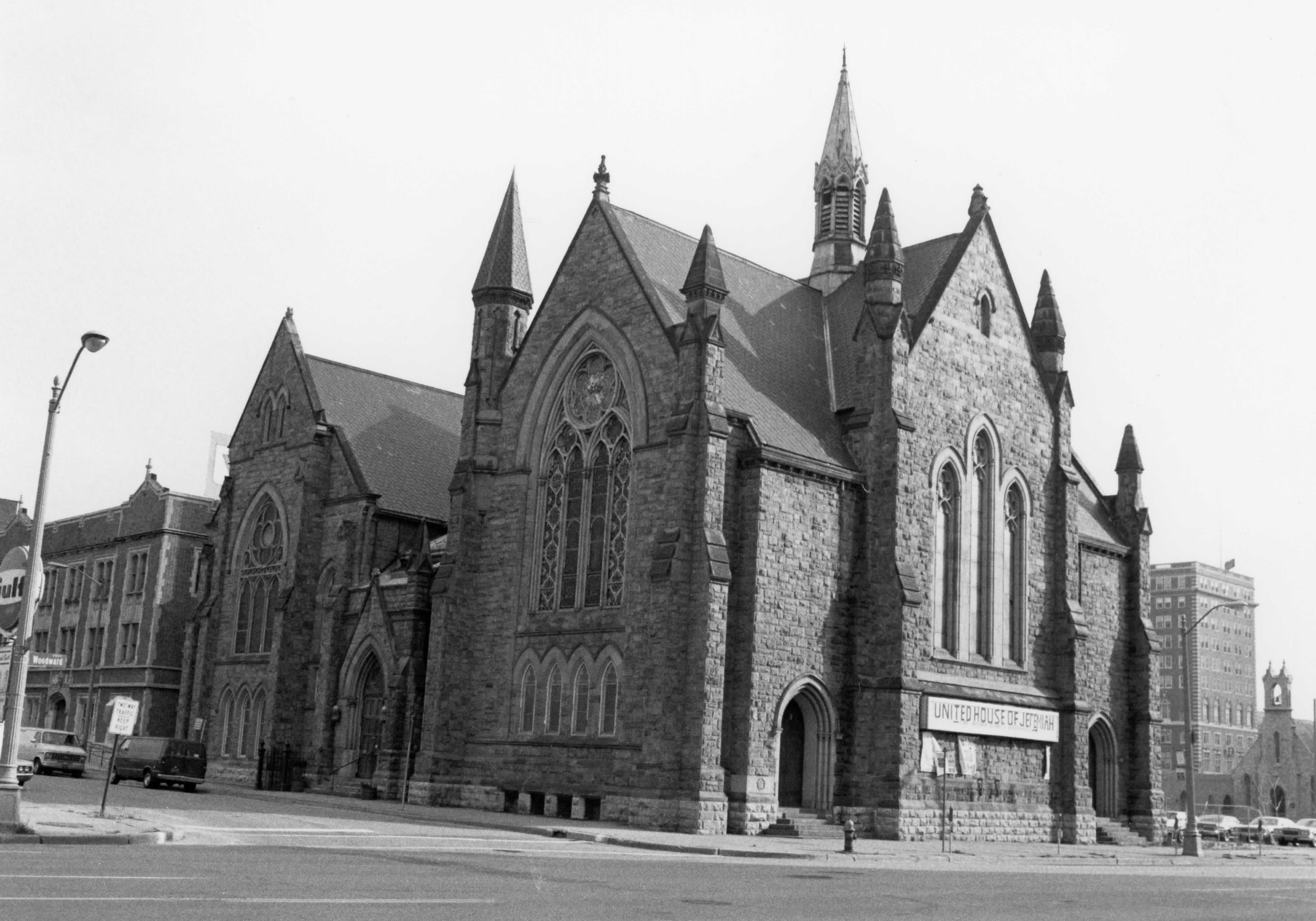
Woodward Avenue Baptist Church built in 1887 by the architects Mortimer Smith & Sons and reformed for the 1936 Woodward widenning was destroyed by fire 1986.

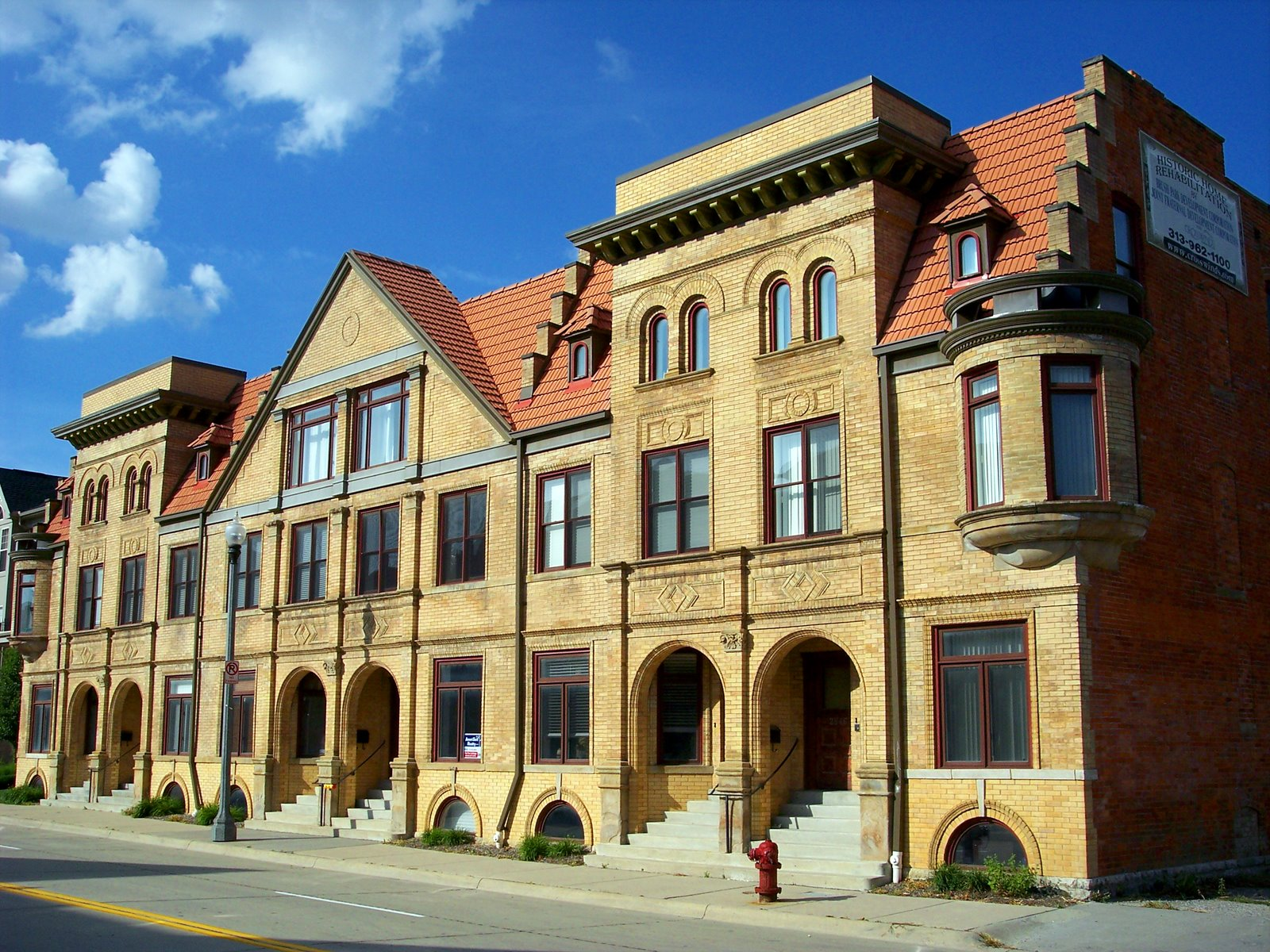
Townhouses designed by William S. Joy & Company for W. W. Hannan in 1895 on John R. Street, renovated as condominiums in 2003.

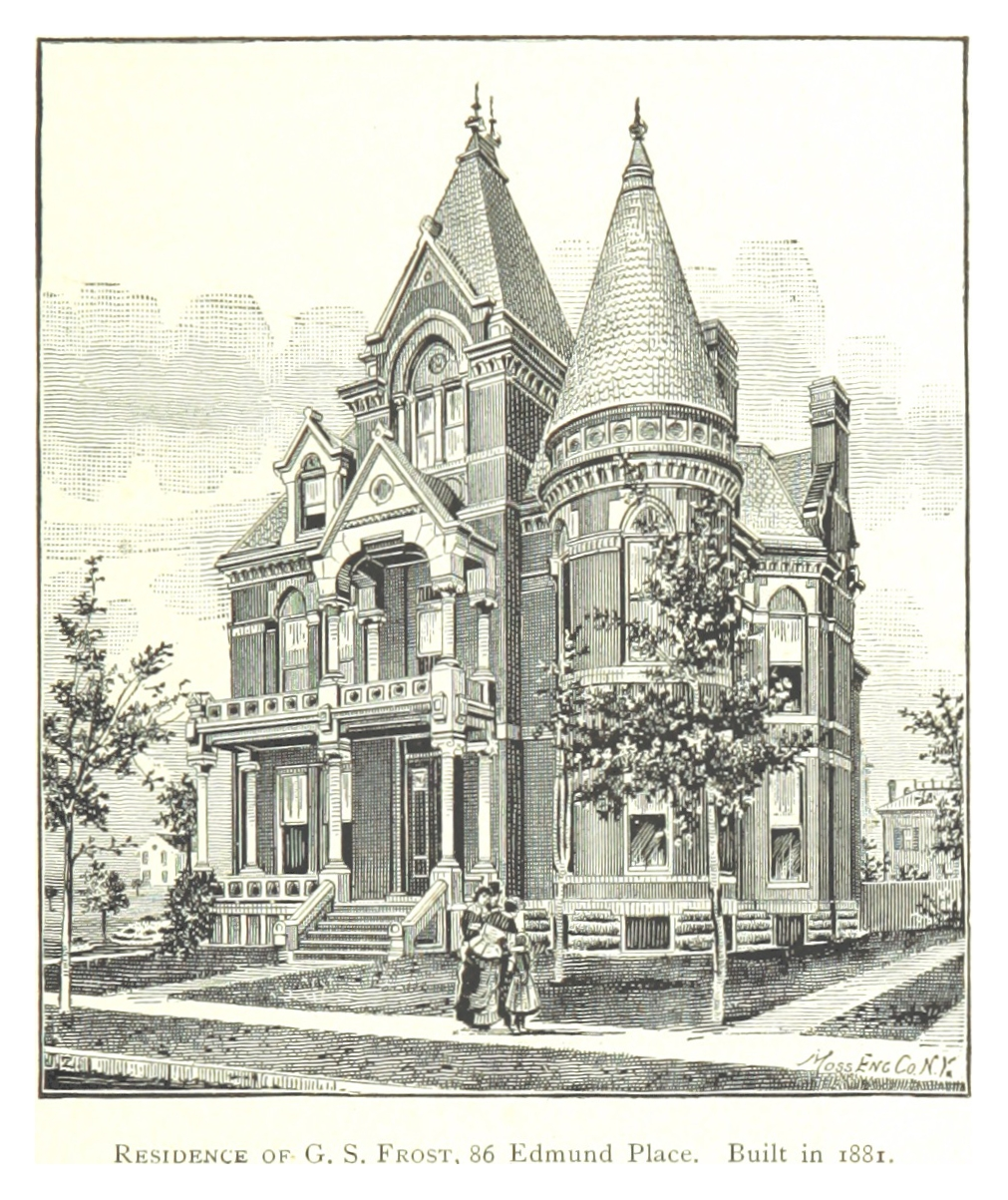
George S Frost House in 246 Edmund Pl, build in 1881.Was demolished in 1998.

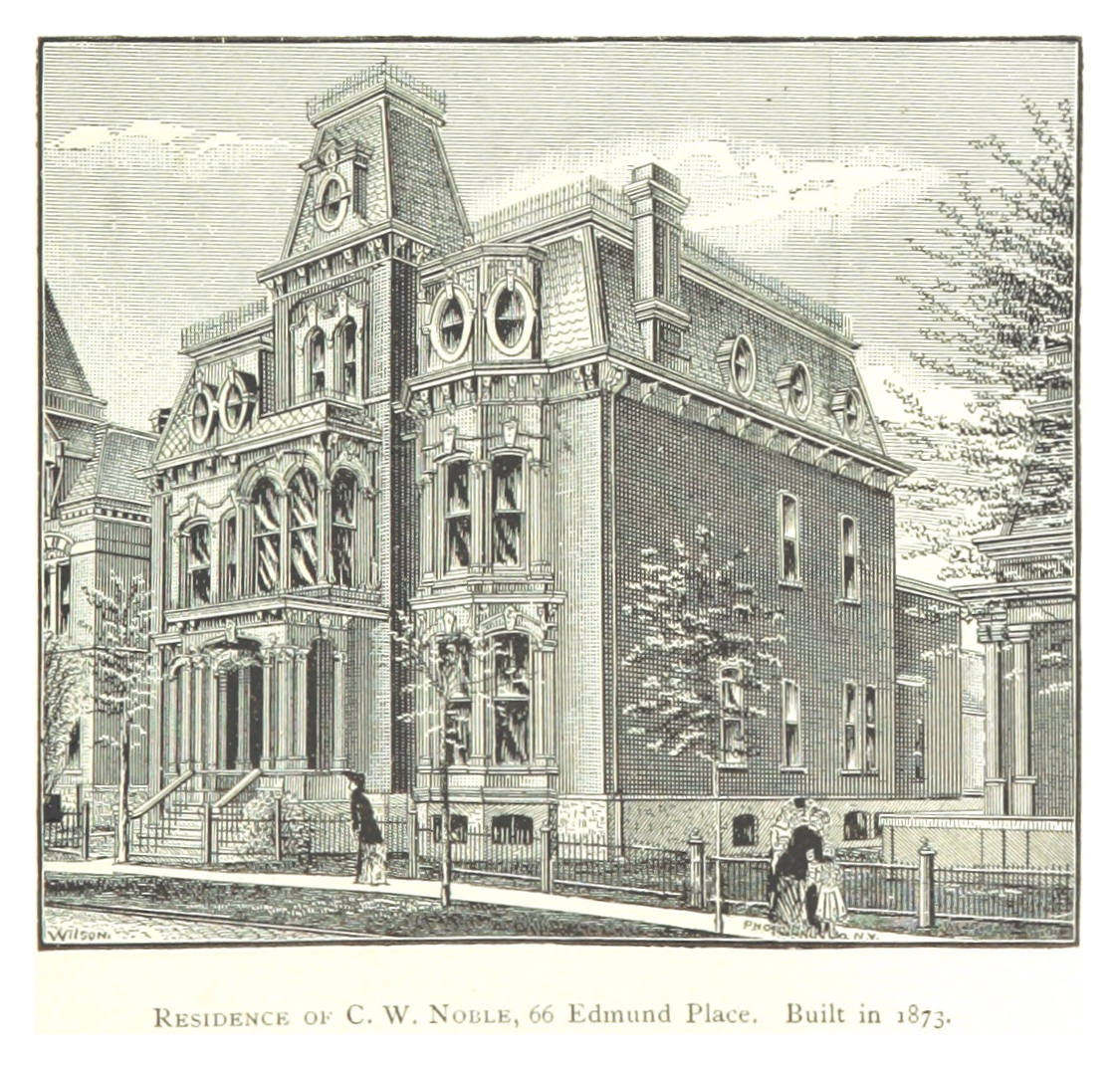
Charles W Noble house in 218 Edmund Pl built in 1873 and demolished in 1968.

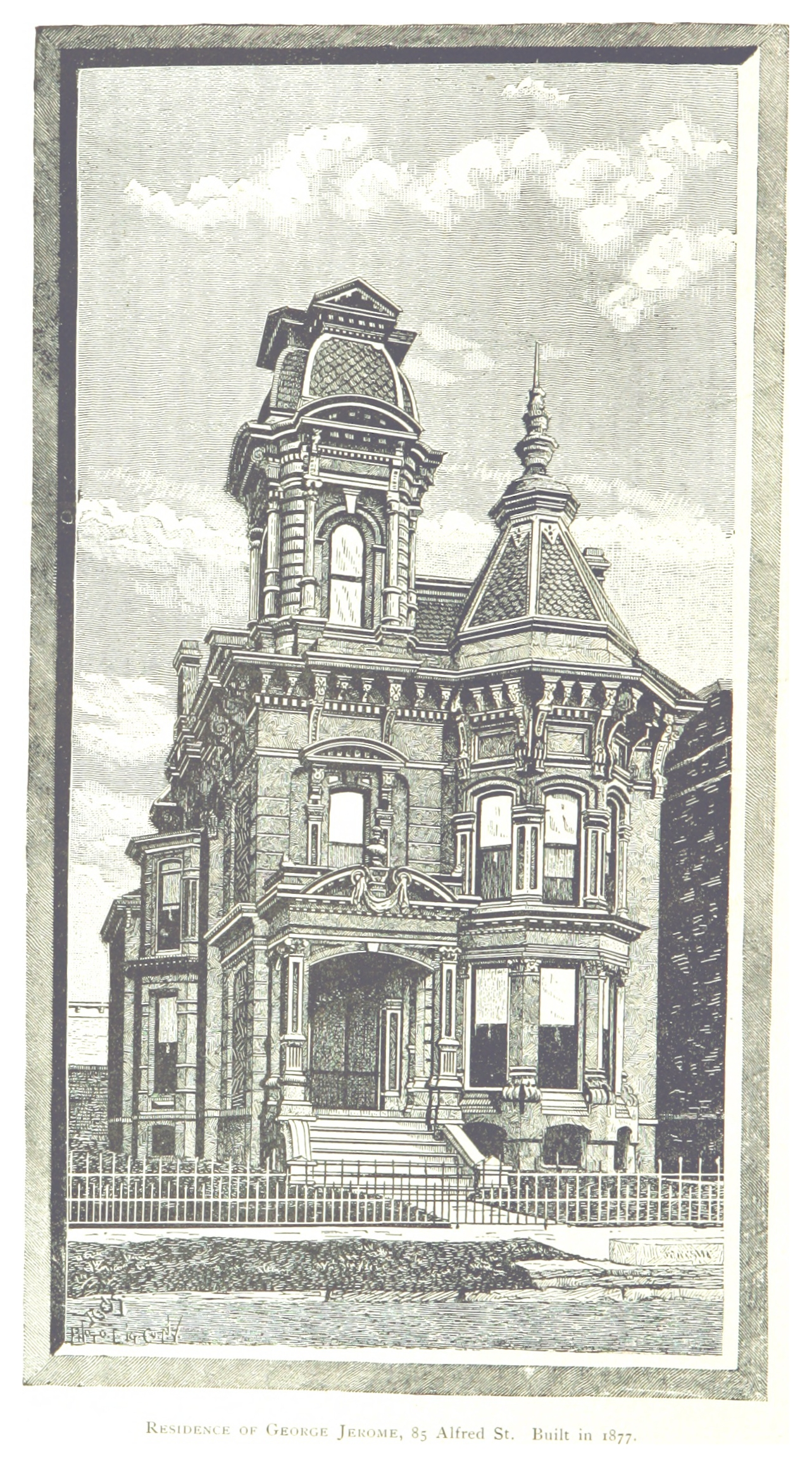
George Jerome House in 251 Alfred Street, built in 1877 possibly by architect Henry T Brush and demolished in 1935.

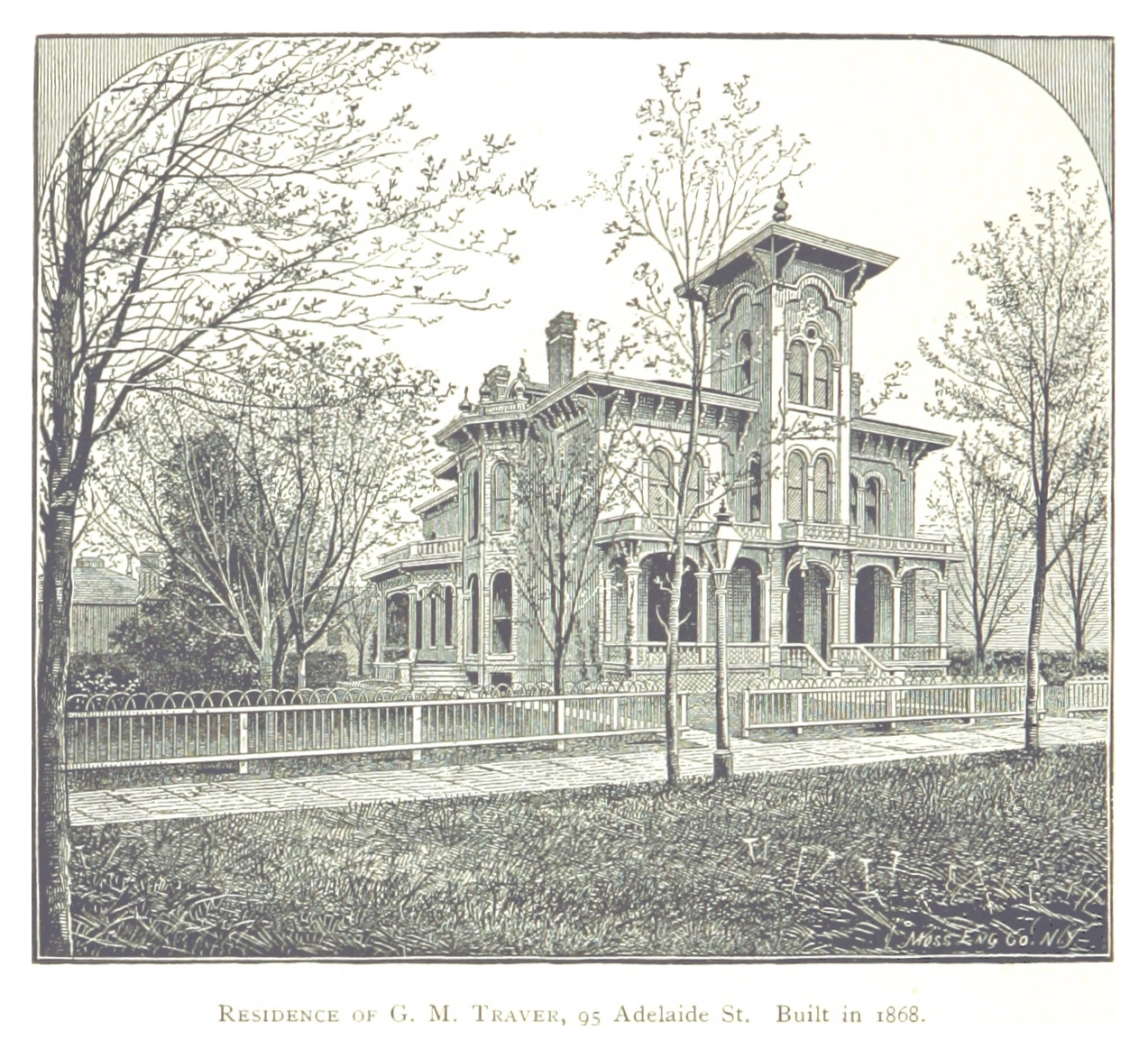
George M. Traver House in 267 Adelaide built in 1868 and demolished in 1920s.

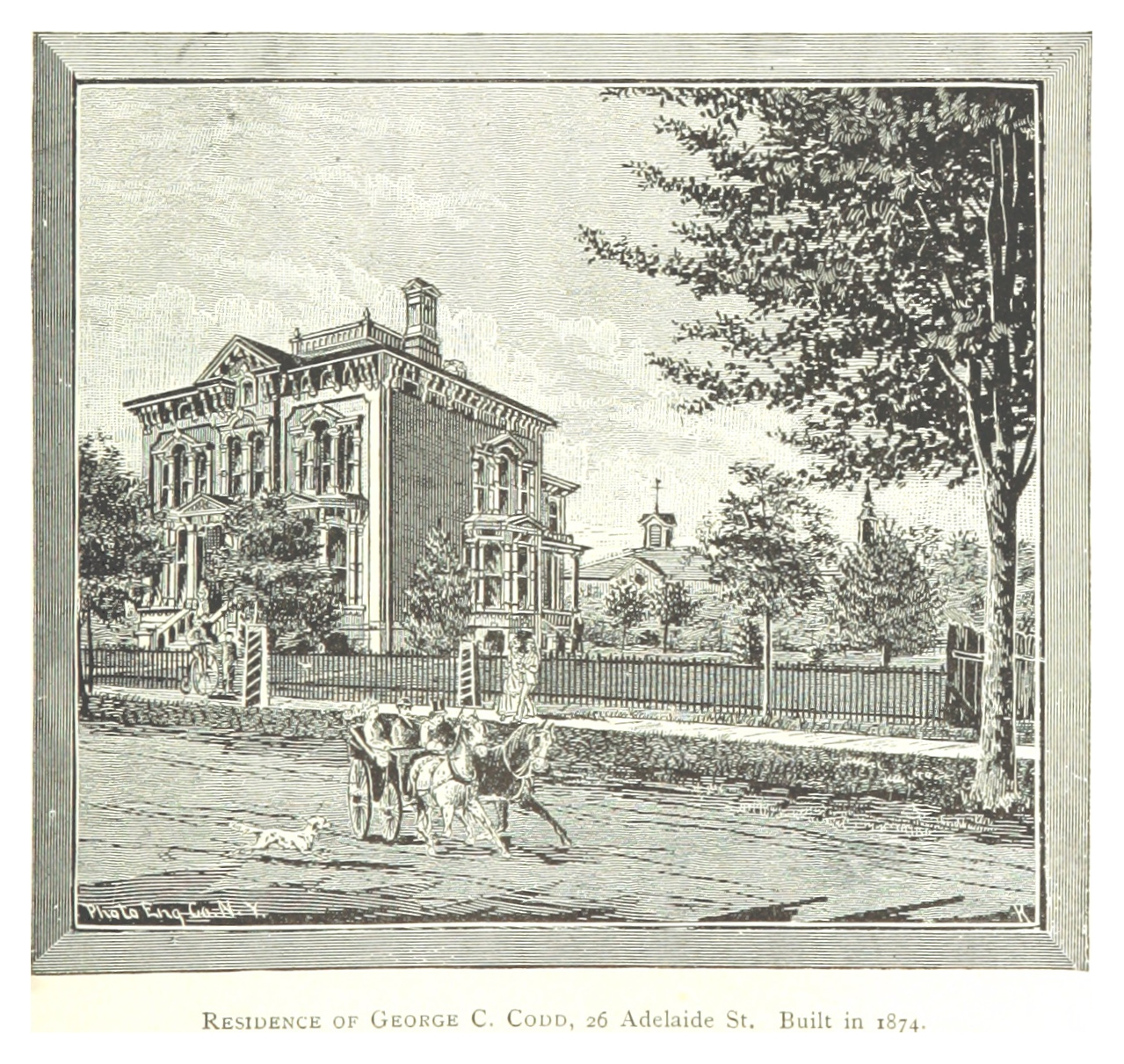
George C Codd House in 56 Adelaide built in 1874 and designed by Mortimer L Smith, was demolished in 1950s.

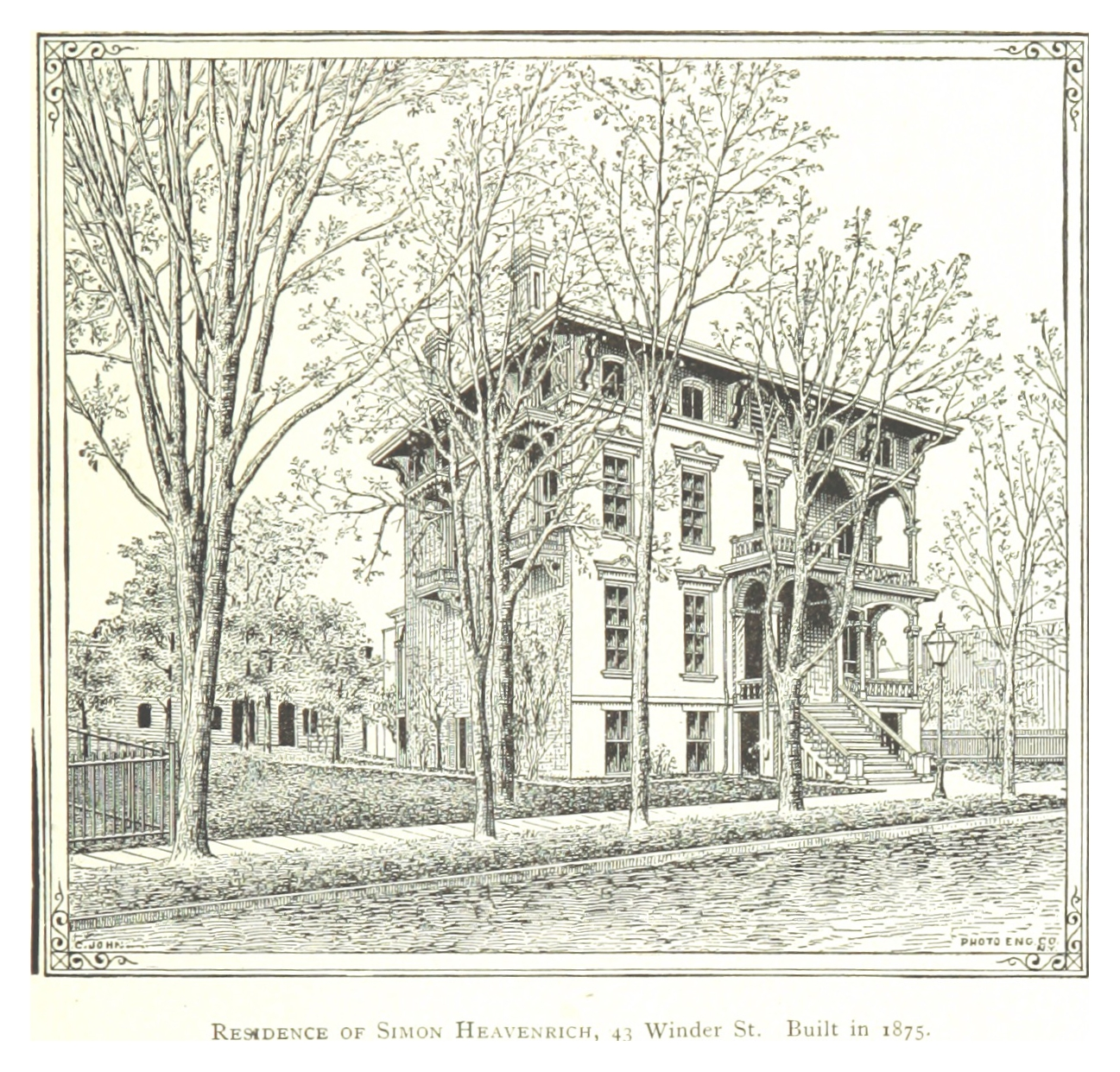
The Simon Heavenrich House in 81 Winder built in 1875, designed by Gordon W Lloyd and demolished in 1931. The house was extensively remodeled in the 1910s to become the Christ Center Metaphysical Church.

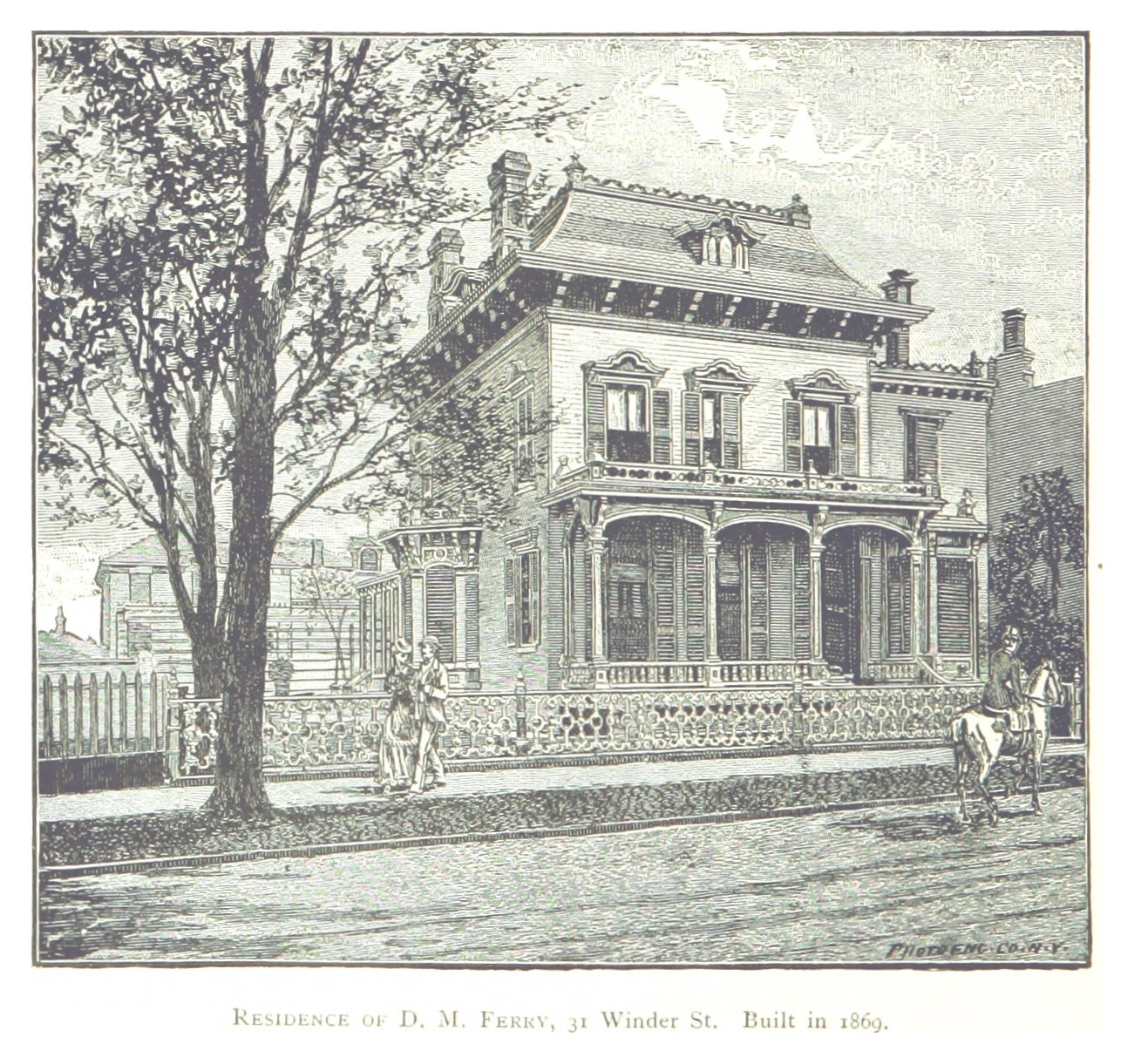
D.M Ferry House in 57 Winder built in 1869 and demolished in 1950s.

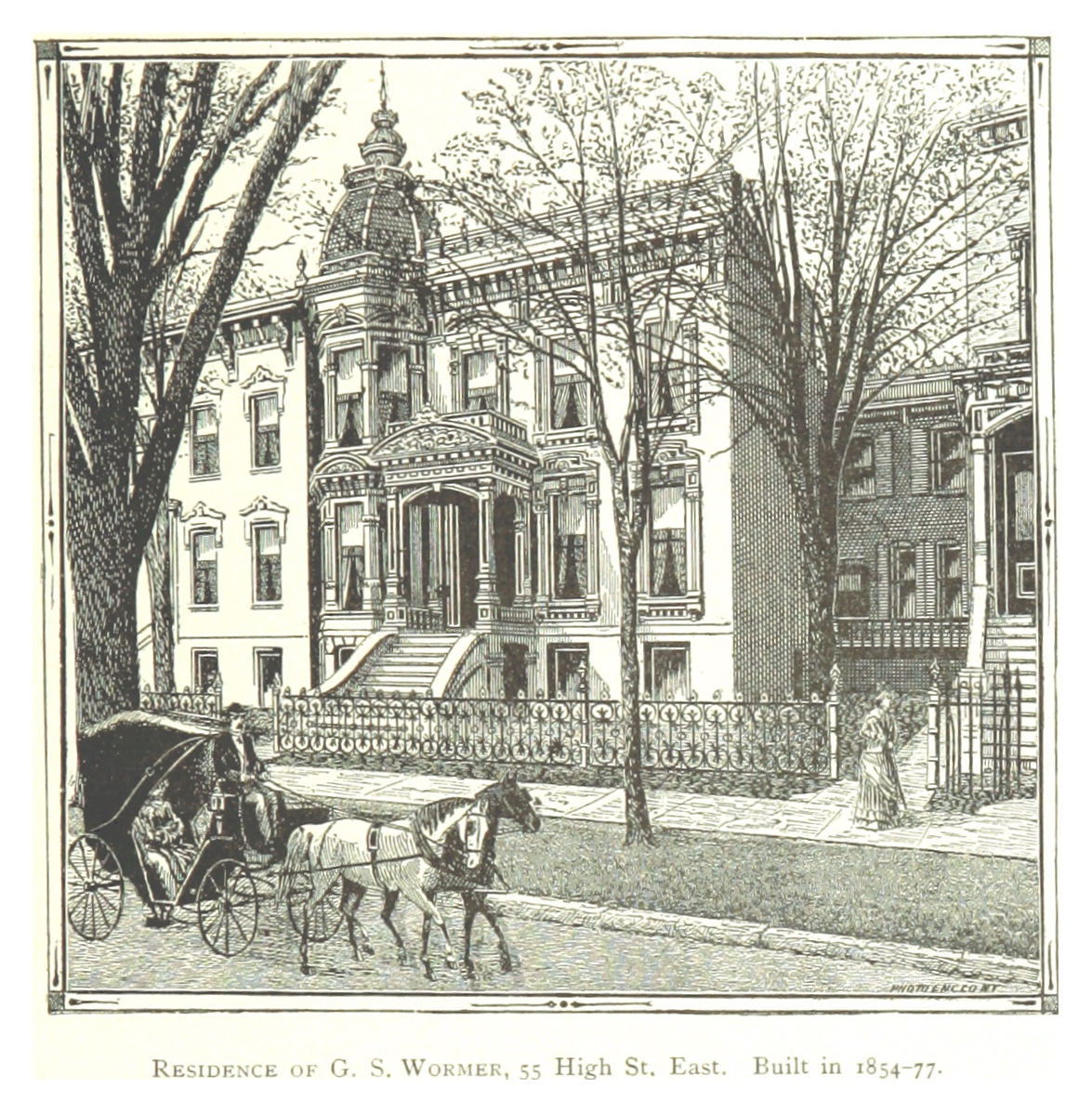
Grover Salman Wormer Residence in 115 E High street built in 1854( reformed in 1877) and demolished in 1960s. The house and the street were destroyed for the construction of the Fisher Freeway.

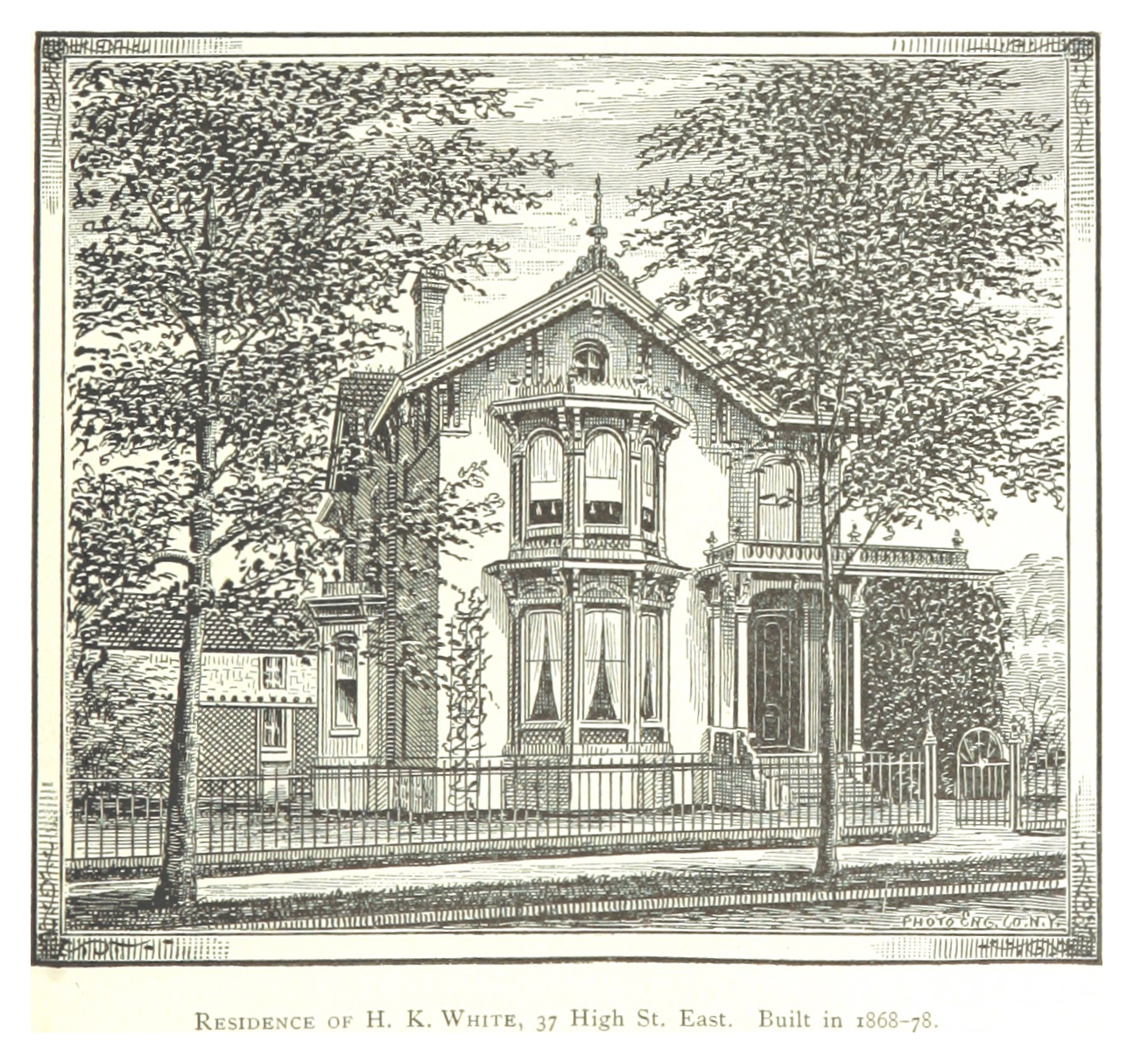
Henry Kirke White House in 77 E High built in 1868 and demolished in 1932. The street was destroyed for the construction of the Fisher Freewey.

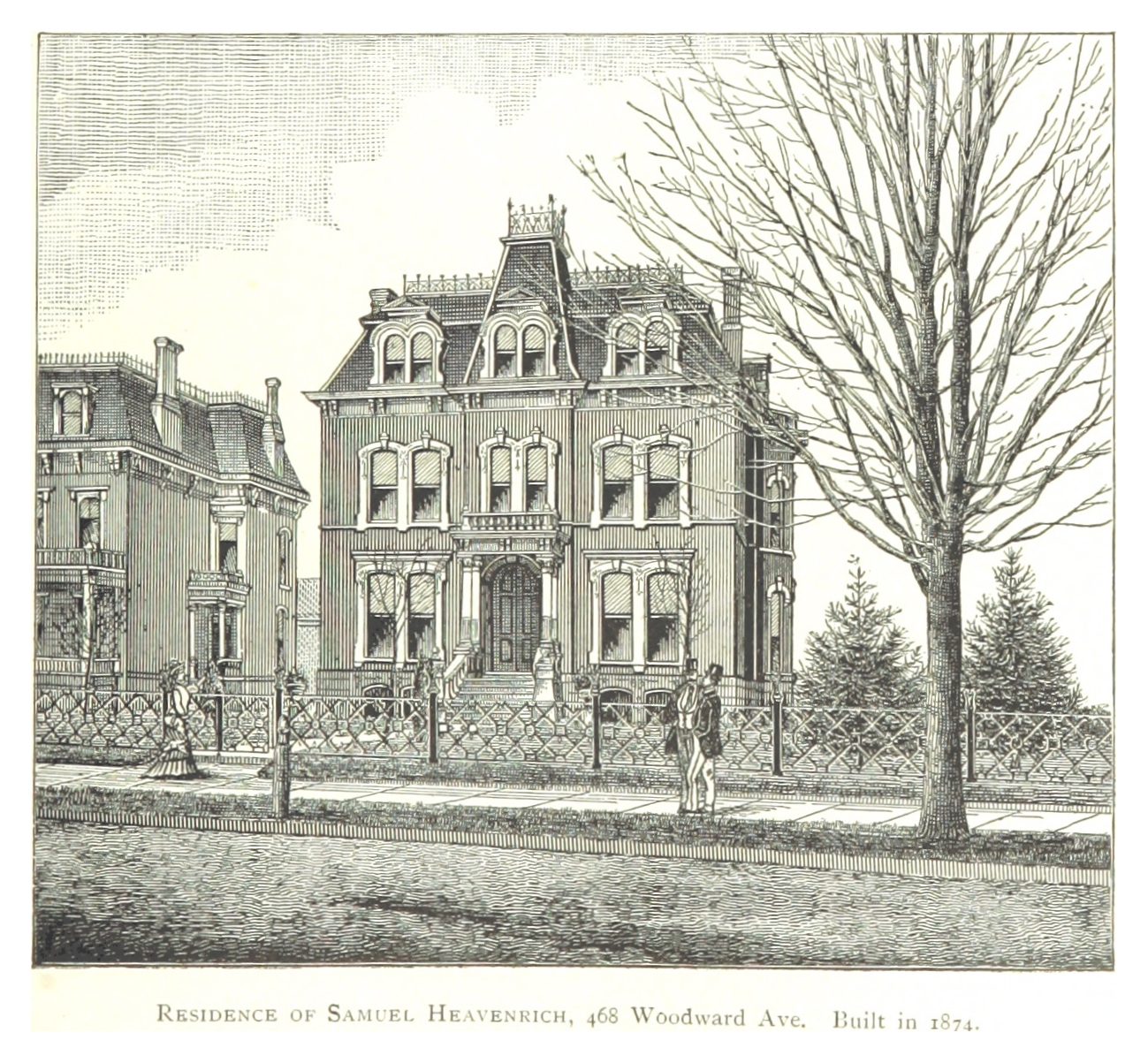
Samuel Heavenrich Residence in 468 Woodward Avenue built in 1874 and demolished in 1920s for the Woodward widening.

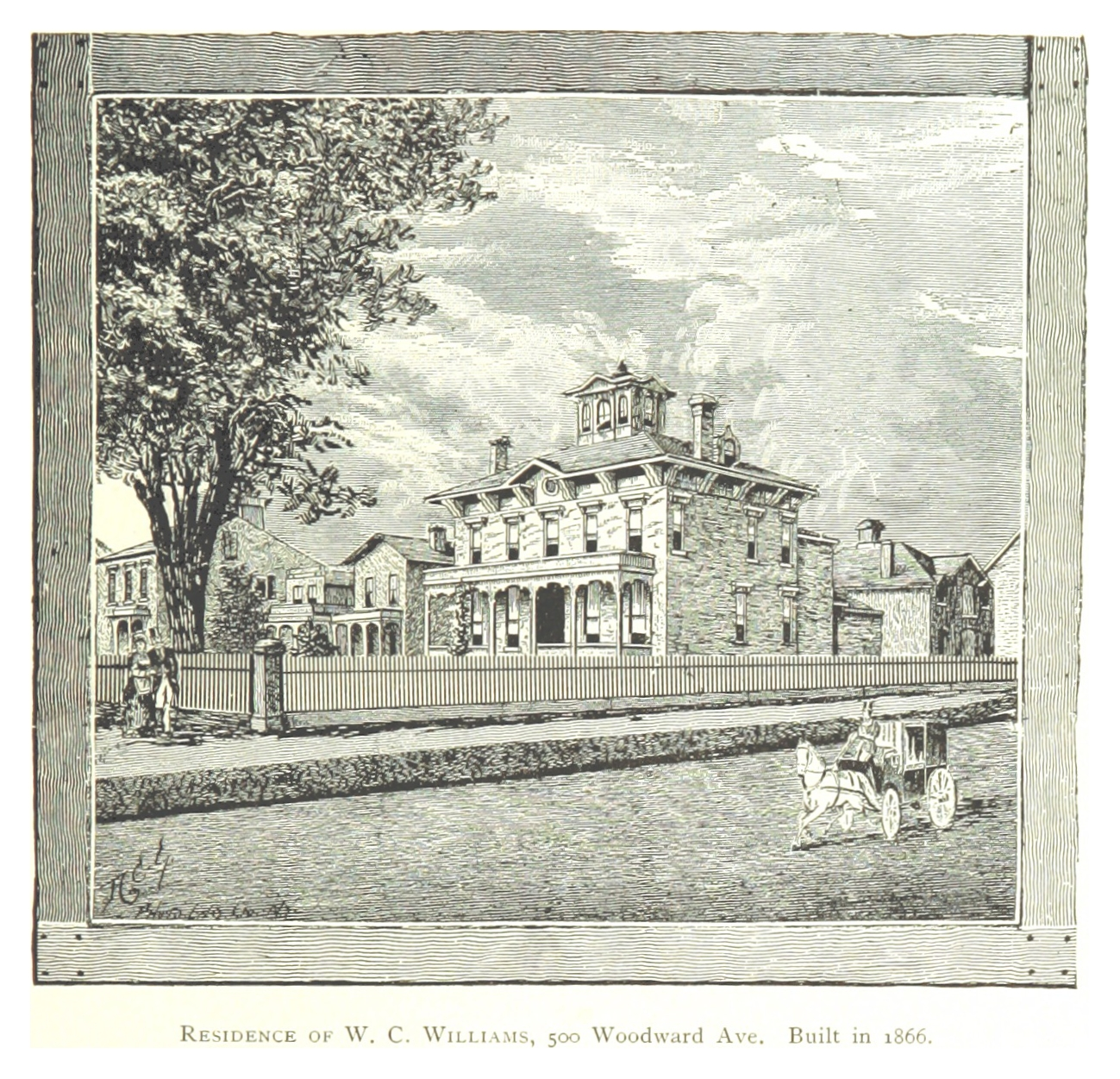
The William C Williams House in 2930 Woodward Avenue built in 1866 and demolished in 1889 for the construction of the First Presbyterian Church.

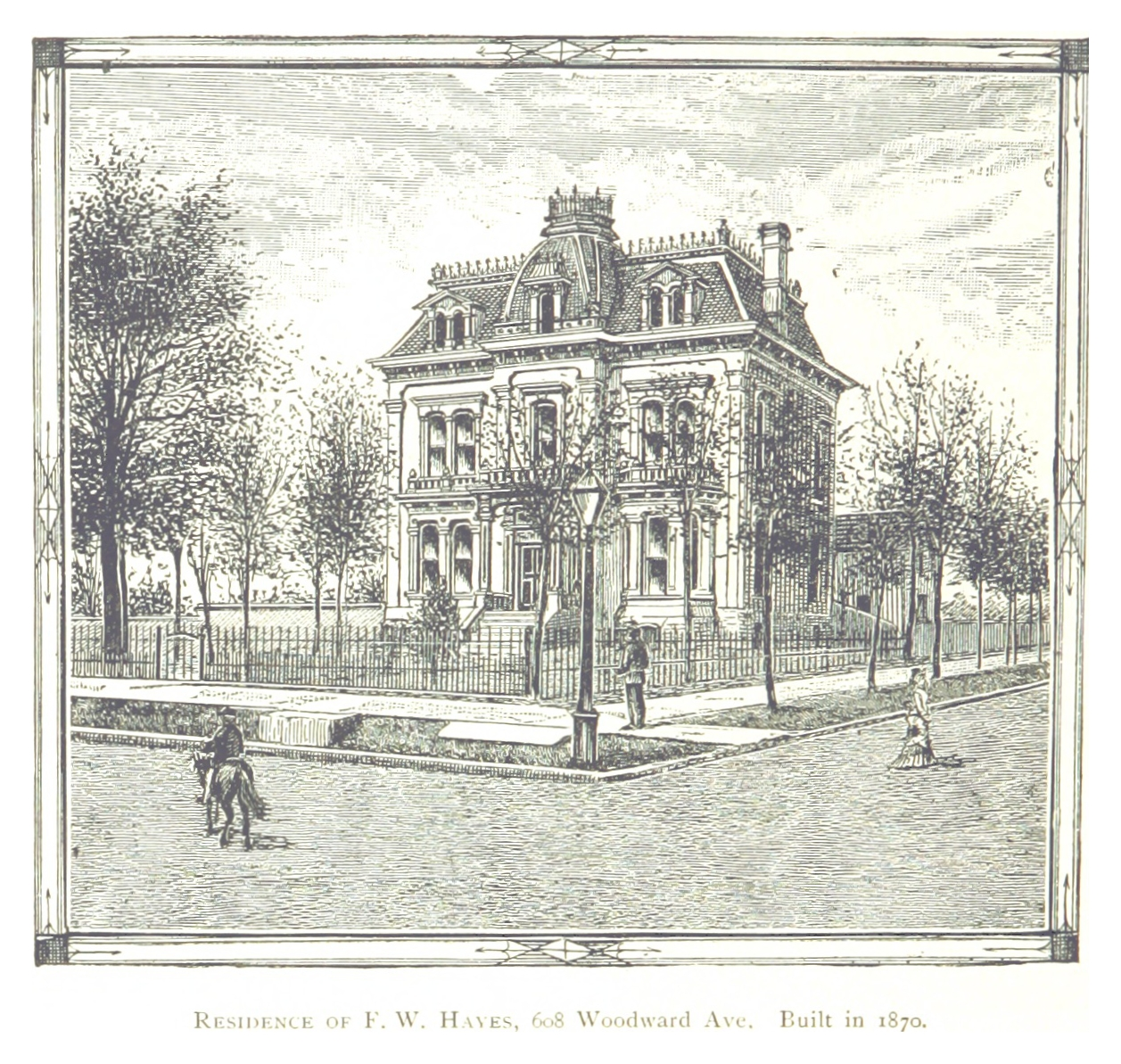
Frederick W. Hayes residence in 3500 Woodward Avenue built in 1870 and demolished in 1916.

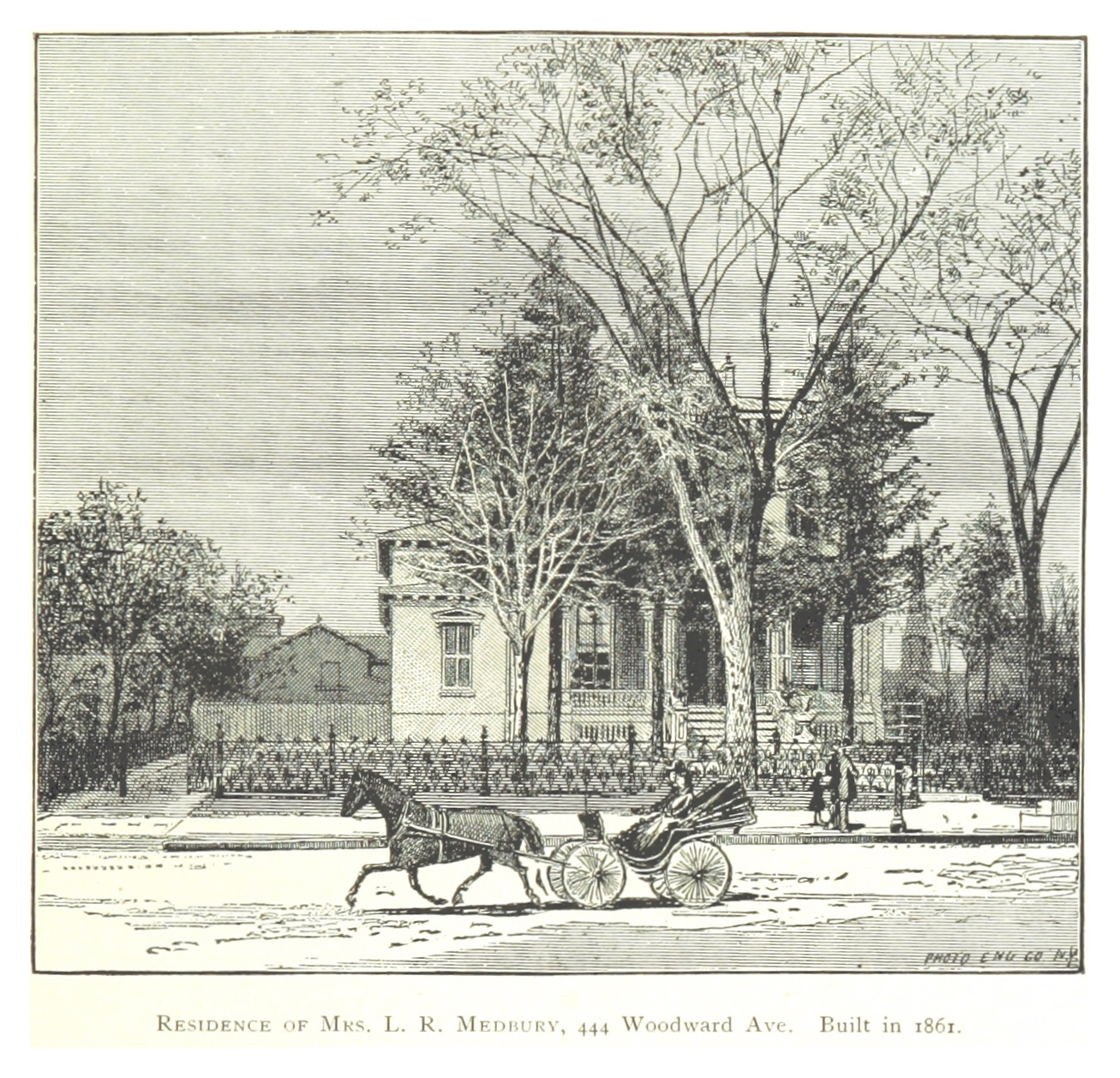
Lucetta R. Medbury House in 2638 Woodward Avenue built in 1861 and demolished in 1920s for the Woodward widenning.

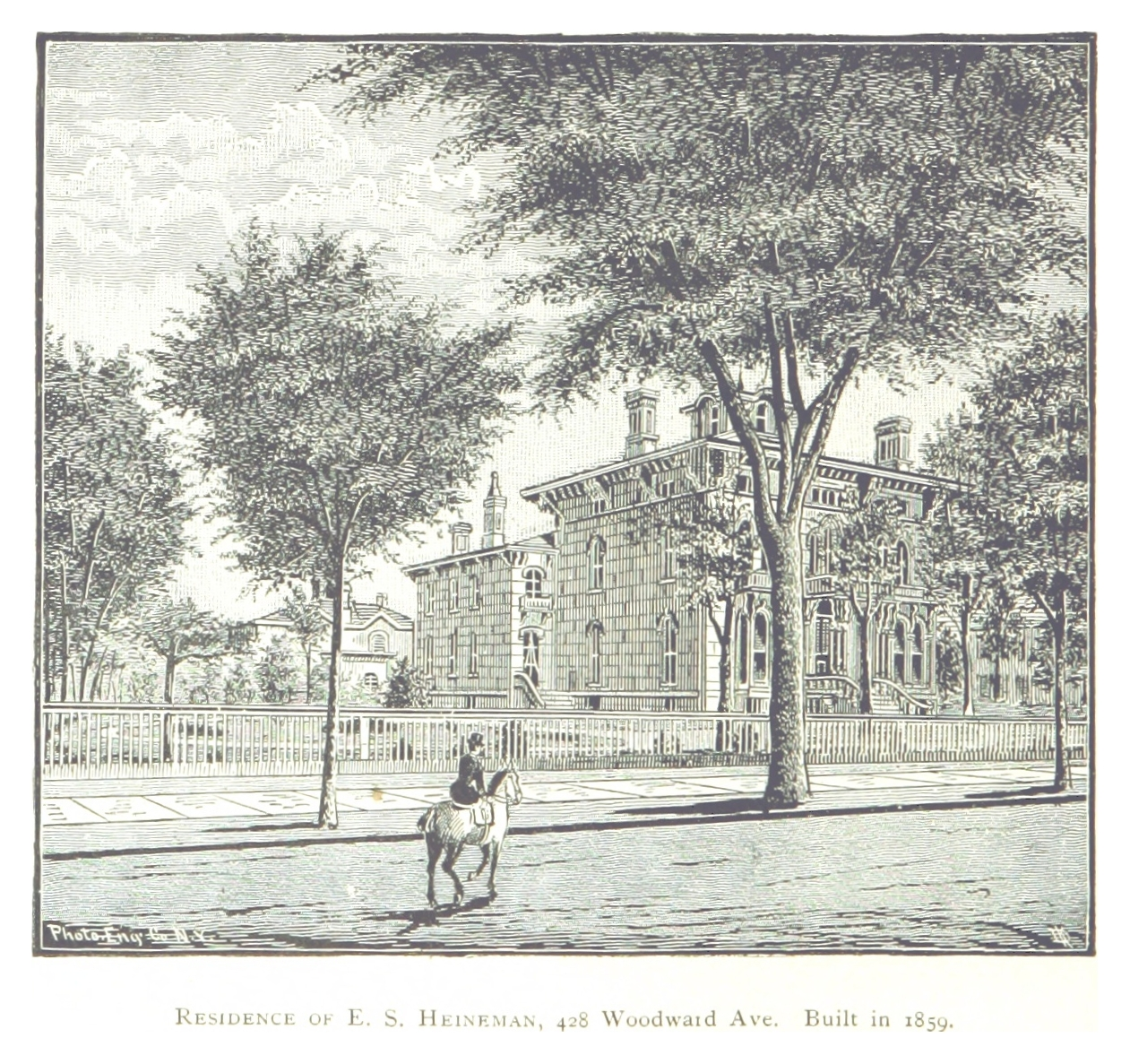
Emil S. Heineman House in 2610 Woodward Avenue built in 1859 and demolished in 1920s for the Woodward widening.

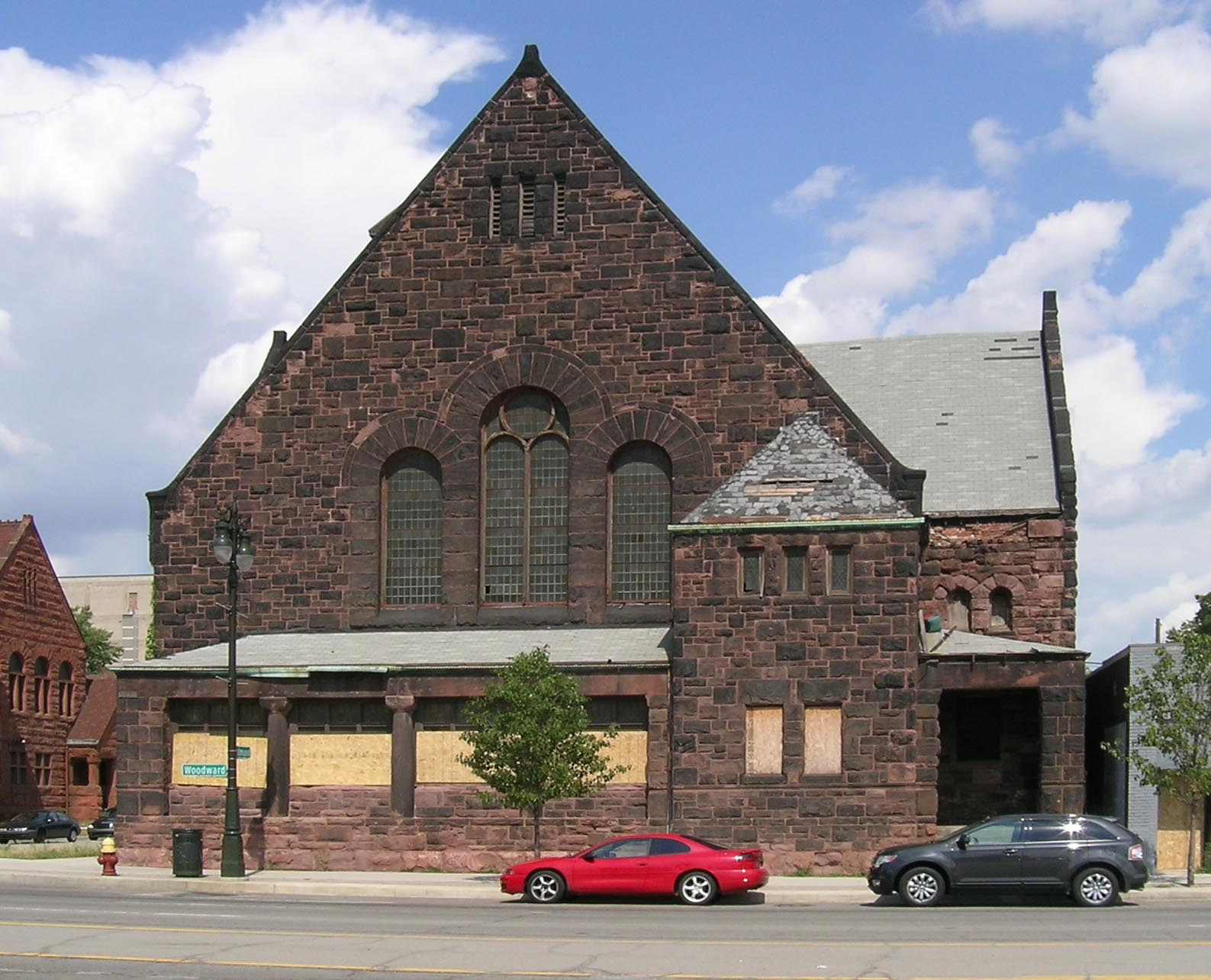
The First Unitarian Church built 1890 by the architects Donaldson y Meier was destroyed by fire in 2014.

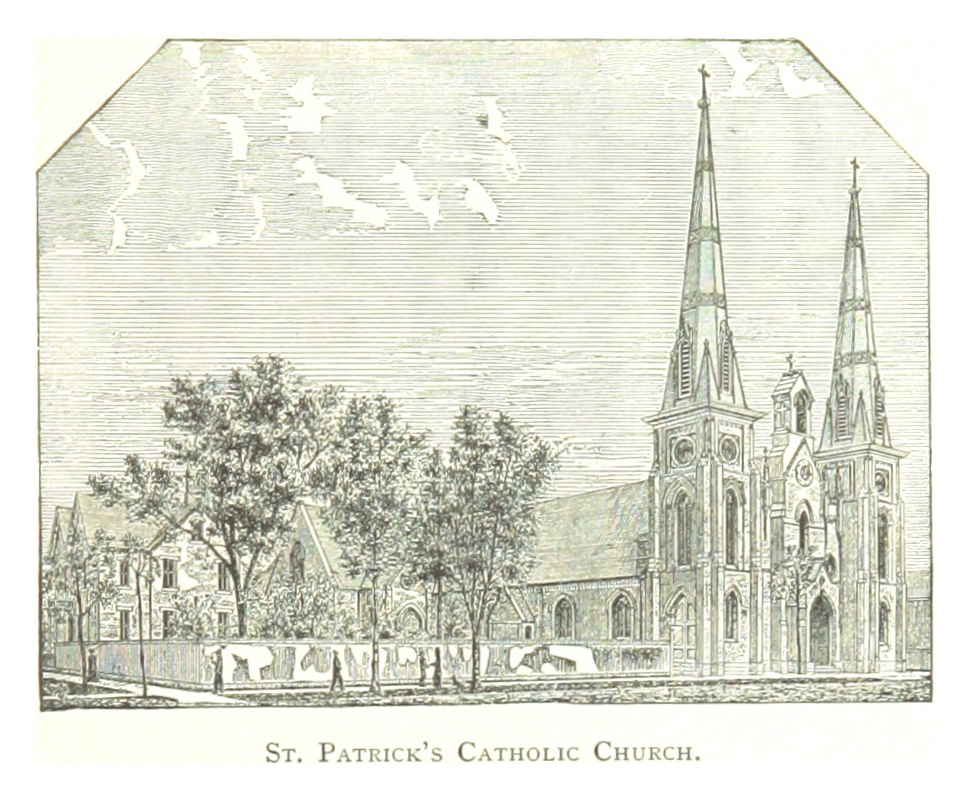
The St Patrick Church built in 1862 in 114 Adelaide by the architects Jordan & Anderson was destroyed by fire in 1993.

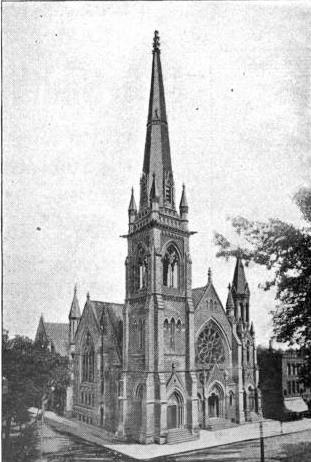
Original Woodward Avenue Baptist Church before the 1935 reformation.

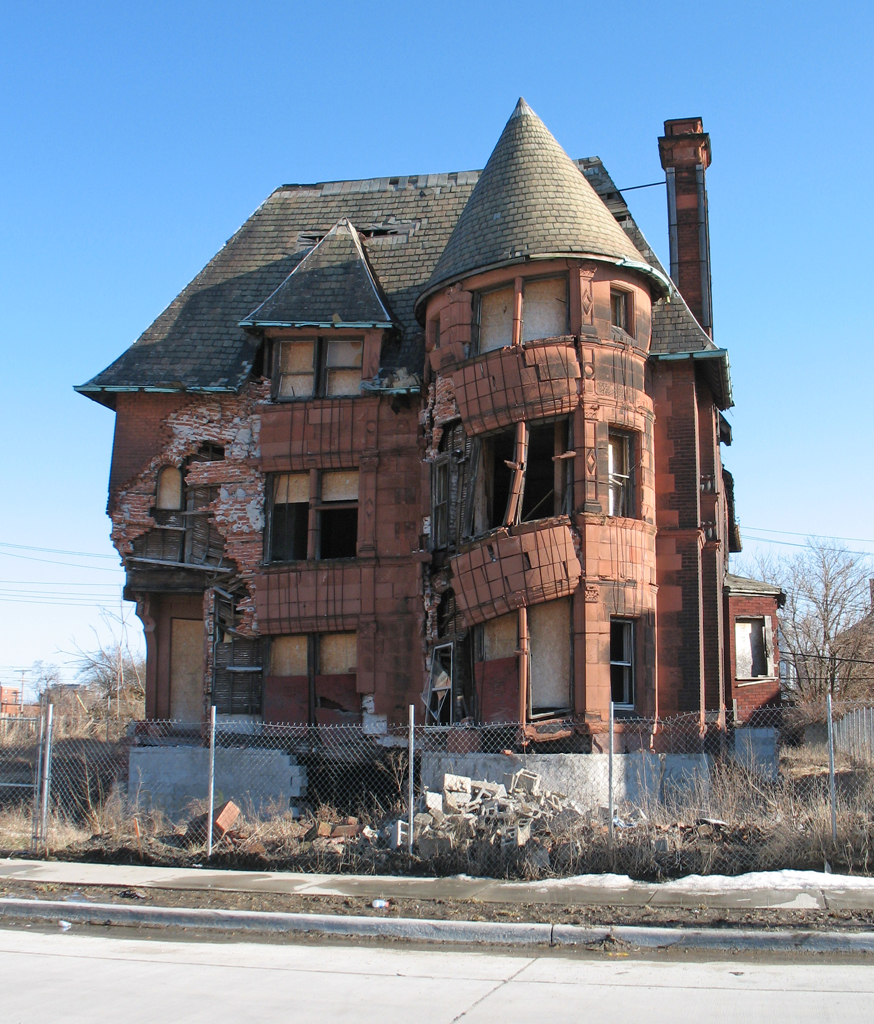
The William Livingstone House, originally located at 76 Eliot Street, was built in 1894 by the architect Albert Kahn. It was later moved to 284 Eliot Street, but languished for years before being demolished in 2007.

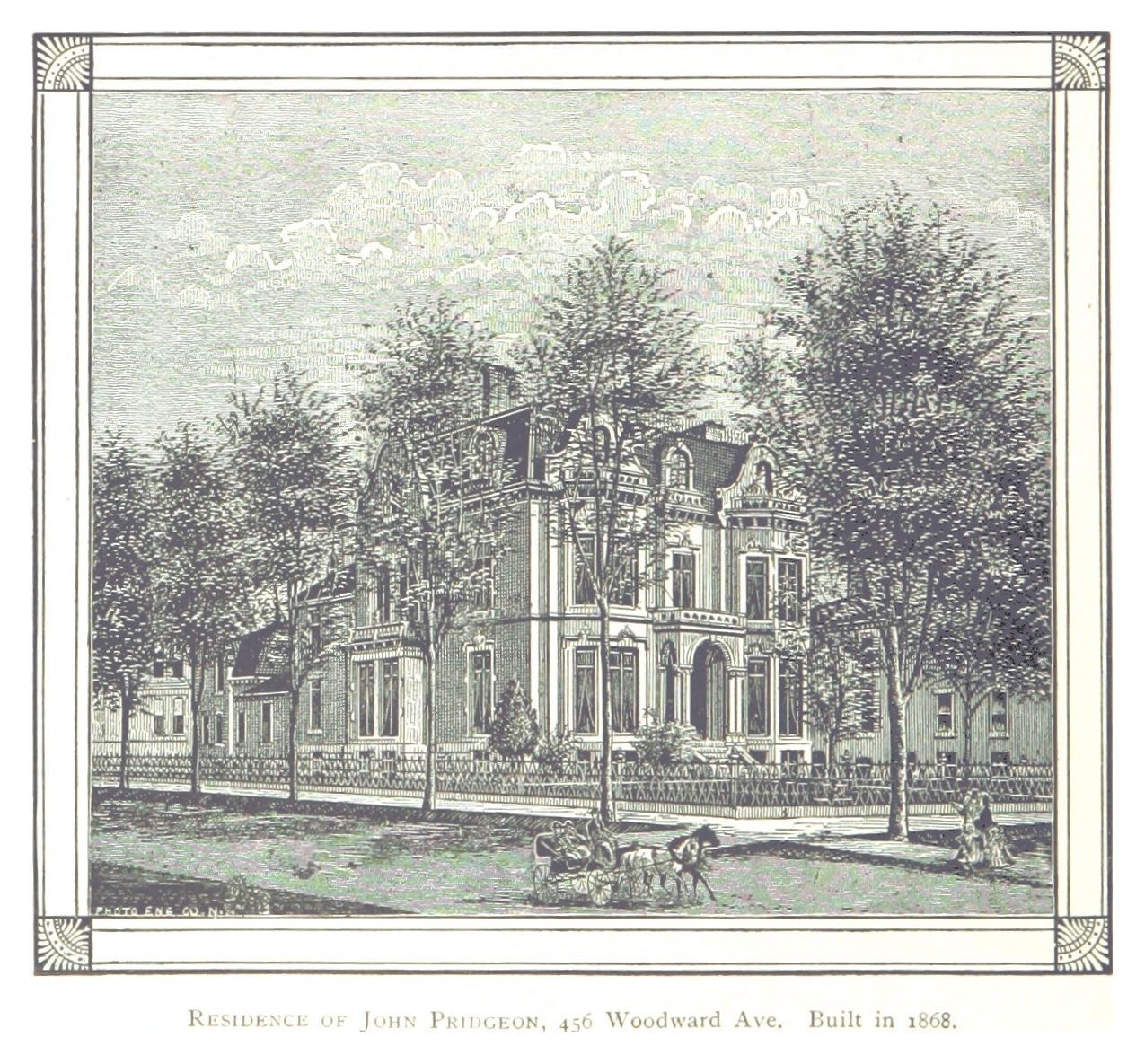
Residence of John Pridgeon in the southeast corner of Alfred and Woodward was built in 1868 by the architect Gordon W Lloyd and demolished in 1890s.

== Notable buildings ==
Name	Image	Year	Location	Style	Architect	Notes
Alpha Phi Alpha Fraternity House		1912	293 Eliot St.	American Foursquare		Since May 15, 1939, this building has housed Gamma Lambda chapter, a local chapter of Alpha Phi Alpha African-American Greek-lettered fraternity. Detroit's Gamma Lambda chapter, founded in 1919, "served as a focal point for black social, cultural, educational, and community service activities in an era when there were few other outlets." The house, built around 1918, was designated a Michigan State Historic Site on August 30, 1977.
Bonstelle Theatre		1902	3424 Woodward Ave.	Beaux-Arts, Greek Revival	Albert Kahn; C. Howard Crane (remodeling)	In accordance with the wishes of rabbi Leo M. Franklin, Albert Kahn designed this neoclassical temple on Woodward Avenue for Detroit's Jewish community. Groundbreaking began on November 25, 1901, with the ceremonial cornerstone laid on April 23, 1902. After the construction of a new synagogue at 8801 Woodward, in 1925 the Temple Beth El was converted into a theater by C. Howard Crane; the façade was later strongly altered with the 1936 Woodward widening. The structure – the oldest synagogue building in Detroit – is listed on the National Register of Historic Places.
Max Broock House		1905	233 Erskine St.	Edwardian	Mueller & Mildner	This house was built in 1905 for Max Broock, a real estate and insurance broker whose offices were located in the Breitmeyer-Tobin Building. Designed by the Detroit firm of Mueller & Mildner, the structure "reflects strongly the transitional character of many houses of the Edwardian period – part Victorian, and part twentieth century."
Frederick Butler House		1882	291 Edmund Pl.	French Renaissance Revival, Second Empire	William Scott & Co.	Built in 1882, the Frederick E Butler House is a French Renaissance Second Empire style mansion containing 8,400 sq ft (780 m^{2}); the original owner, Frederick Eugene Butler (1851-1920), was a banker. It was restored and converted to condos in 2006. The house, located within the Woodward East Historic District, is presently now as Edmund Place.
James V. Campbell House		1877	261 Alfred St.	Italianate		James Valentine Campbell (1823–1890) was secretary of the Board of Regents of the University of Michigan, justice of the Michigan Supreme Court, and Marshall Professor of Law at the University of Michigan. The house was occupied by the Campbell family from 1877 to 1891. The building is within the Woodward East Historic District.
The Carlton		1923	2915 John R. St. at Edmund	Beaux-Arts, Chicago School	Louis Kamper	The Carlton Plaza Hotel opened on May 31, 1924; designed by famed Detroit architect Louis Kamper, it was his "12th major commission, and his firm's first documented hotel project." During the Jazz Age, the hotel became a popular gathering place for wealthy and affluent African-Americans, including some of the biggest names in jazz. In 1950, Ebony magazine described the Carlton as "the most beautifully decorated and most elaborately furnished hotel for Negroes anywhere in the U.S."; in May 1960, Jet heralded it as "the premier destination for the discriminating negro." By the 1980s, the hotel had progressively fell into decay; taken over by the City of Detroit and shuttered in the 1990s, it was bought by private investors and renovated as condominiums in 2005.
Carola Apartments		1912	78 Watson St.	Renaissance Revival		Renovated as condominiums.
Lyman Cochrane House		1870	216 Winder St.	Italianate		This house is a relatively rare example of residential Italianate architecture in Detroit. It was originally built for eye doctor John F. Terry, but in 1871 was sold to Lyman Cochrane. Cochrane was a state senator and Superior Court Judge, serving in this capacity until his death in 1879.
Crystal lofts		1919	3100 Woodward Ave. at Watson	Art Deco	Bernard C. Wetzel	Originally constructed by architect Bernard C. Wetzel for Hugh Chalmers as a ballroom (the Crystal Palace), the building was recently renovated as condominiums. The Art Deco façade was added in 1936 for the Woodward widening.
J.P. Donaldson House		1879	82 Alfred St.	Queen Anne	Mason & Rice; Gordon W. Lloyd (remodeling)	This house was built in 1879 for James P. Donaldson, a ship chandler. In 1892, David Charles Whitney (son of David Whitney Jr.) acquired the home, which was completely renovated by Gordon W. Lloyd. At the time it was said to be one of the most substantial homes in Detroit and valued at $30,000 (today $750,000±). The home had several other owners before becoming a rooming house; in 2012 the building was sold to a private buyer for $110,000. In the same year the mansion was a movie set for the vampire film Only Lovers Left Alive, directed by Jim Jarmusch. Today it remains a private residence. A tenant experience of unwanted attention by the landlord Jeff Cowin was featured in a local news article in 2025.
Martin A Edwards House		1899	305 Eliot St.	Victorian, Edwardian	Donaldson & Meier	Built in 1899 for Martin A Edward, a constructor, the house was later sold to Clifford Elliot, a wholesale grocery executive. This turn-of-the-century structure exemplifies the transition from the Victorian design to the Edwardian style of architecture.
First Presbyterian Church		1889	2930 Woodward Ave.	Richardsonian Romanesque	George D. Mason	George D. Mason modeled the First Presbyterian Church after Henry Hobson Richardson's Trinity Church in Boston. When Woodward was widened in 1936, the elaborately carved entrance porch was moved from the Woodward façade to the Edmund Place side. The church is listed on the National Register of Historic Places.
John P. Fiske House		1875	261 Edmund Pl.	Second Empire, French Renaissance Revival, Victorian	Henry T Brush & Mortimer L Smith	Originally built for Alfred F. Wilcox in 1875, and later sold to John P. Fiske, a Detroit merchant of china and crockery. The house, located within the Woodward East Historic District, was designated a Michigan State Historic Site on August 18, 1988. Today it remains a private residence.
Ransom Gillis House		1876	205 Alfred St. at John R.	Venetian Gothic	Henry T. Brush & George D. Mason	This building was heavily documented by John Kossik and photographed by documentarian Camilo José Vergara. The house, built between 1876 and 1878 for Ransom Gillis (1838-1901), a wholesale dry goods merchant, is within the Woodward East Historic District.
Bernard Ginsburg House		1898	236 Adelaide St.	Tudor Revival	George W. Nettleton & Albert Kahn	Bernard Ginsburg (1863-1931) was an important figure in philanthropy, civic service, and the Jewish community in Detroit during the late 19th and early 20th century. He commissioned architect Albert Kahn to design this house, one of Kahn's earliest works. Kahn went on to become well known in industrial and commercial architecture; the Ginsburg house and its English Renaissance style exhibited is typical of Kahn's early work. The house is listed on the National Register of Historic Places.
John Harvey House		1887	97 Winder St.	Second Empire	John V. Smith	John Harvey (1835-1905) was a pharmacist and philanthropist. The house contains 11,000 square feet (1,000 m^{2}), eight marble fireplaces, and three-story staircase. Developers purchased the John Harvey House in 1986, renovated the structure, and, in 2005, opened it as the Inn at 97 Winder, a bed and breakfast. The house is listed on the National Register of Historic Places.
Hudson–Evans House		1873	79 Alfred St.	Second Empire, French Renaissance Revival, Italianate	Julius Hess	Also known as the Joseph Lothian Hudson House or the Grace Whitney Evans House. Built in 1874 for shipowner Philo Wright, the house was a gift from David Whitney Jr. to his daughter Grace upon her marriage to John Evans in 1882. It later became the Joseph L. Hudson family residence. Listed on the National Register of Historic Places. Today the building is used as a law office.
Albert Kahn House		1906	208 Mack Ave.	English Renaissance	Albert Kahn	In 1906, architect Albert Kahn (1869-1942) built a home for his personal use. He lived in this mansion fronting Mack Avenue from 1906 until his death in 1942; the structure was later obtained by the Detroit Urban League, which still uses it today. The house is listed on the National Register of Historic Places.
George Ladve House		1886	269 Edmund Pl.	Eastlake Victorian		Originally owned by George Ladve, 269 Edmund Pl., an Eastlake Victorian style mansion built in 1886 and restored in 2008, contains 7,400 sq ft (690 m^{2}). Ladve had owned a carpet and upholstery company. In the late 1890s, the Frohlich family added a music room. Edward P. Frohlich was among the original philanthropists to the Detroit Symphony Orchestra. The house is within the Woodward East Historic District. Today it remains a private residence.
Lucien S. Moore House		1885	104 Edmund Pl.	French Renaissance Revival, Gothic Revival		Originally owned by lumber baron Lucien S. Moore, 104 Edmund Place, built around 1885 in a French Renaissance Gothic Revival style and restored in 2006, has 7,000 sq ft (650 m^{2}). The Lucien Moore House restoration was featured December 27, 2005, by HGTV's restore America Initiative in partnership with the National Trust for Historic Preservation. It may also be known as the Moorie Town House or The Edmund.
Patterson Terrace		1905	203-209-213 Erskine St.	Richardsonian Romanesque	Joy & Barcroft	Abandoned after a fire, completely renovated and converted into luxury apartments.
H.P. Pulling House		1874	48 Edmund Pl.	Victorian		Henry Perry Pulling (1814–1890) was a doctor and the president of the Peninsular Bank from 1860 until its closure in 1870. After Pulling's death the house was occupied for a brief time between 1892 and 1894 by Hamilton Carhartt, founder of the Carhartt clothing company.
Emanuel Schloss House		1872	234 Winder St.	Second Empire		Built between 1870 and 1872, this Second Empire house was the residence of Emanuel Schloss and his wife, Rebecca. Emanuel Schloss was a dry goods merchant and haberdasher; an active member of the Detroit Jewish community, he served in 1860 as president of Temple Beth El, the oldest Jewish congregation in Michigan. The home has been restored and now operates as the 234 Winder Street Inn. It was designated a Michigan State Historic Site on August 18, 1988.
Horace S. Tarbell House		1869	227 Adelaide St.	Victorian, Italianate		The oldest existing structure in Brush Park, the house was constructed in 1869 and originally owned by Horace Sumner Tarbell (1838–1904), Michigan Superintendent of Public Instruction from 1876 to 1878. Over the following decades, the property changed hands multiple times before being abandoned and falling into disrepair.
Elisha Taylor House		1871	59 Alfred St.	French Renaissance Revival, Second Empire, Victorian, Gothic Revival	Julius Hess	The Elisha Taylor House, with its French Renaissance Revival, Second Empire mansard roof, has distinct elements of Victorian and Gothic Revival style and was built in 1870 for William H. Craig, a Detroit land speculator. In 1875, Craig sold the house to Elisha Taylor (1817-1906). Taylor was a Detroit attorney who held many offices during his career, including City Attorney, assistant Michigan Attorney General from 1837 to 1841, and Circuit Court Commissioner from 1846 to 1854. The house is listed on the National Register of Historic Places. Today it remains a private residence.
Joseph F. Weber House		1901	206 Eliot St.	Colonial Revival		Originally owned by lumber baron Joseph F. Weber (1845-1935), the house was built in 1901. The architect is unknown; however, the structure's Colonial Revival character "is suggestive of such firms as Rogers and MacFarlane, who were already active in the Indian Village and Boston–Edison areas designing houses of colonial derivation." The Joseph F. Weber House was designated a Michigan State Historic Site on December 17, 1987.
Henry Glover House		1874	229 Edmund Pl	Second Empire		229 Edmund Street was built by businessman Henry Golver (1812–1892) in 1874. Glover worked for a general merchandise and lumber trading firm and later became involved in real estate speculation, in which he was quite successful. In addition to this house, he built his previous home at 801 West Ford Street in 1856 (demolished). He also built a three-story commercial building on West Jefferson Avenue (demolished). After building his home on Edmund Place, in 1880 he built a duplex residence to the right of his own at 239–245 Edmund. One of these houses was a wedding present for his daughter Clara D. Glover and her husband John B. Nicol. Glover died in his home in 1892. His second wife, Imogen Dimock, continued to live in the house for a few more years, but at the beginning of the 20th century, the house was sold and substantially enlarged to become an apartment building. The house continued to be used as apartments until the 1980s, when it was abandoned. In November 2012, the duplex 239/245 Edmund was demolished after 20 years of neglect. During demolition work, one of the machines struck the weak rear wall of the Glover house, causing the rear half of the building to collapse. The city then ordered its demolition, but neighbors rallied to prevent it. In 2017, the developer Doug Quada purchased the house and, after more than seven years of restoration and reconstruction it reopened in 2024 as a nine-unit condominium complex.
MacLeurin House		1894	312 Watson St.	Romanesque	Almon C Varney	The house was built in 1894 for the reverend Donald MacLeurin, who was the Pastor for Woodward Avenue Baptist. It was home to the Most Worshipful Mt. Sinai Grand Lodge from 1921 to 1943. The building was completely restored in 2017.
Jacobs House		1880	311 Watson St.	Second Empire		The first occupant of this house was Albert Poole Jacobs (1858-1909), a lawyer. The home was later converted into a rooming house and a store (since demolished) was built on the right side. The house was abandoned in the 1970s and was restored in the 2000s.
Phoenix Club		1905	114 Erskine St.	English Renaissance	Albert Kahn	Built in 1905 for the Phoenix Club, today the building houses the King David Grand Lodge.
Standart House		1872	64 Edmund Pl.	Italianate		The house was built around 1871 or 1872 by developer John Edwards. The first owner was businessman Henry Winslow Standart (1842-1880); after his death, his wife Flora Belle Van Huson Standart continued to live there for a few more years until the early 1900s. During this time the house was extensively renovated and enlarged, a large wing was built in the rear to convert the building into apartments and in the front, the small center porch and the two bay windows on either side were replaced with a large porch that spanned the entire façade. The house remained in this form until the 1980s when it became abandoned; someone around this time removed the large front porch and replaced it with a replica of the original. Today it is boarded up with the rear extension in a state of disrepair awaiting a developer interested in restoring it.

== Popular culture ==
The Ransom Gillis house appeared in the intro of the movie Beverly Hills Cop (1984), Four Brothers (2005) and Batman vs Superman (2016).

The J.P Donaldson house was featured in Only Lovers Left Alive (2014)

The Frederick Butler house largely inspired Count Olaf's house in Netflix's Series of Unfortunate Events (2017)

== Education ==
Brush Park is within the Detroit Public Schools district. Residents are zoned to Spain Elementary School for K-8, while they are zoned to Martin Luther King High School (9-12) for high school.
