= Albert Kahn House =

Historic house in Michigan, United States

- U.S. National Register of Historic Places
- Michigan State Historic Site
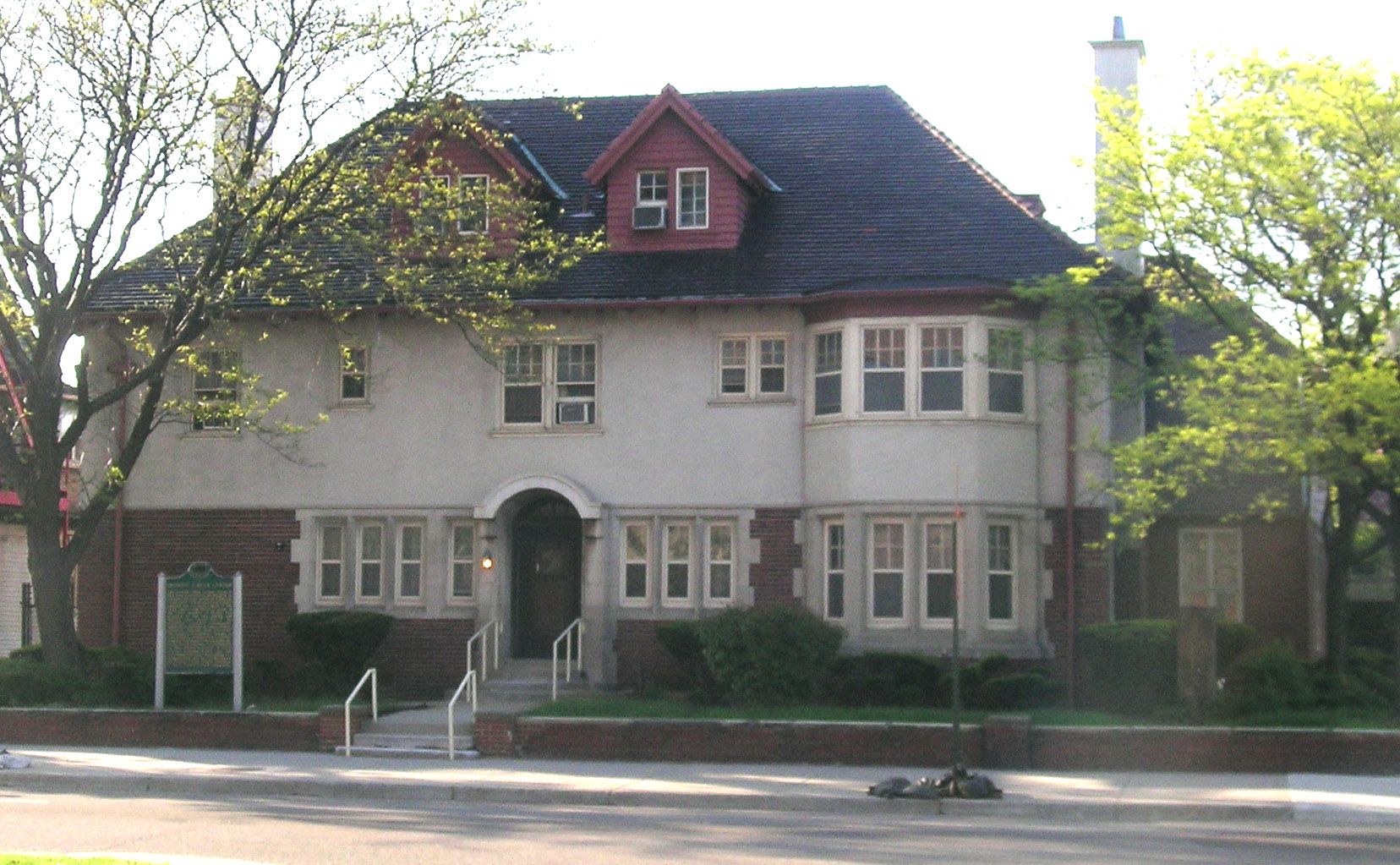
- Albert Kahn House, seen from across Mack Ave.
- Interactive map
- Location: 208 Mack Avenue; Detroit, Michigan
- Coordinates: 42°20′54″N 83°3′21″W
- Built: 1906
- Architect: Albert Kahn
- Architectural style: Late 19th And 20th Century Revivals
- NRHP reference No.: 72000668

Significant dates
- Added to NRHP: October 18, 1972
- Designated MSHS: December 7, 1971

The Albert Kahn House is in Midtown Detroit, Michigan, within the Brush Park district. It is currently the headquarters of the Detroit Urban League. The house was designated a Michigan State Historic Site in 1971 and listed on the National Register of Historic Places in 1972.

== History ==
In 1906, architect Albert Kahn built a home for his personal use in Brush Park. In 1921, Kahn added a bathroom to the master suite. In 1928, as his business and social connections grew, Kahn added a wing to house his library and art collection.

Albert Kahn lived in the home from 1906 until his death in 1942. The Detroit Urban League obtained the building two years later. They continue to use it for their offices.

== Architecture ==
Kahn's home is a two-story English Renaissance house, but with modern look. The first story is clad in brick with a gray stone trim. The second story is stuccoed, and the roof is slate. The materials in the facade stress horizontal lines, while a group of windows emphasize the vertical. Two gabled dormers interrupt the roofline on the front of the home. A stone arch surrounds the Mack Avenue entrance, and is elaborately carved with Kahn's own floral design.

The house is soundproof and fireproof, with each floor constructed of reinforced concrete with wooden sleepers overtop, supporting the finished wood floors. On the first floor, the hall and dining room is finished in paneling, and the den is finished in half timber and half plaster. A kitchen and servant's room is also located on the first floor. The second floor originally housed five bedrooms, two bathrooms and a sewing room; the 1921 renovation added a bathroom. The attic originally contained an extra servant, but was later renovated to house two rooms and a bath. The 1928 expansion added a large gallery to the first floor, with a new garage behind, Over the gallery and garage are an additional guest bedroom, den and bath, and an additional servant's bed and bath.
