= Ecumenical Theological Seminary =

- Former name: Ecumenical Theological Center
- Type: Private seminary
- Established: 1980
- President: Theodore T. Turman
- Dean: Brandon Grafius
- Location: Detroit, Michigan

The Ecumenical Theological Seminary is a private seminary in Detroit, Michigan. Founded in 1980 as the Ecumenical Theological Center, the seminary offers graduate degrees and certificates in religious studies. It is housed in a building built in 1889 to house the First Presbyterian Church; the seminary began leasing the building in 1992 and was donated the building, lands, and endowment in 2002.

== History ==
The seminary traces it roots to the Institute for Advanced Pastoral Studies, an institution founded in 1957 to provide continuing education for Christian ministers. This institution merged with the Ecumenical Theological Center in 1980. In 1994, the center changed its name to the Ecumenical Theological Seminary and began offering an academic credential (the "Diploma in Christian Ministry" later the "Urban Ministry Diploma Program," now the "Leadership in Ministry Program"). Three years later, the seminary began the process of gaining accreditation from the Association of Theological Schools. In 2002, after allowing the seminary to lease the former First Presbyterian Church for ten years, the Presbytery of Detroit gave the seminary the building, its grounds, and it endowment.

== Academics ==
The Ecumenical Theological Seminary awards Master's degrees, Doctoral degrees, and certificates in religious studies and ministry. The seminary is accredited by the Association of Theological Schools.

The degrees offered by ETS are: Doctor of Ministry (DMin); DMin with a concentration in Clinical Pastoral Education (DMin-ACPE); Master of Divinity (MDiv); Master of Arts in Pastoral Ministry (MAPM); Master of Arts (MA) in Biblical Studies; and Master of Arts in Theological Studies (MATS). Other programs include: Leadership in Ministry Diploma (LMD); and Certificate in Theological Studies (CTS). The LMD is an undergraduate-level program that offers a pathway to the Master's programs for students without bachelor's degrees, and is also designed for persons with an interest in seminary studies without pursuing a degree. Continuing Education credit is also available.

In the academic year 2025-2026, the seminary opened its Urias Beverly CPE Center, filling a need in Detroit for a center for Clinical Pastoral Education.

The seminary is notable for its diverse student body and faculty, including students from many Christian denominations as well as other faith traditions.

== Campus ==
- First Presbyterian Church
- U.S. National Register of Historic Places
- U.S. Historic district – Contributing property
- Michigan State Historic Site
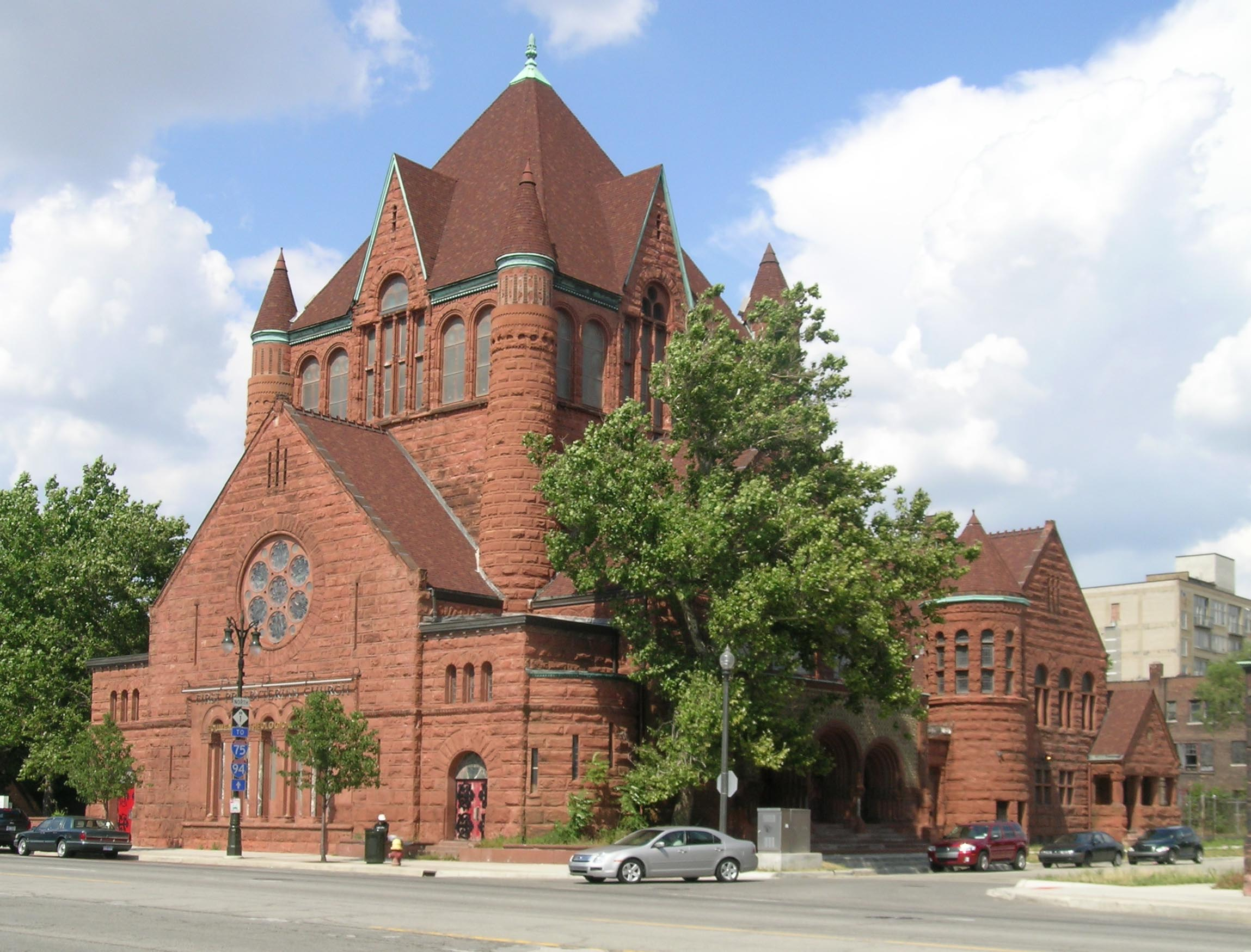
- First Presbyterian Church seen from across Woodward
- Location: 2930 Woodward Avenue; Detroit, Michigan
- Coordinates: 42°20′39″N 83°03′18″W
- Built: 1889
- Architect: George D. Mason & Zachariah Rice
- Architectural style: Richardsonian Romanesque
- NRHP reference No.: 79001174

Significant dates
- Added to NRHP: December 19, 1979
- Designated MSHS: August 3, 1979

The seminary occupies and owns the building and lands that were originally the First Presbyterian Church. It was built in 1889 and is listed on the National Register of Historic Places, is a designated Michigan State Historic Site (1979), and a contributing property to the Brush Park Historic District.

=== Architecture ===
George D. Mason and Zachariah Rice modeled the First Presbyterian Church after Henry Hobson Richardson's Trinity Church in Boston. The church, in the Richardsonian Romanesque style, is made from rough-cut red sandstone, with the floorplan in the shape of a Greek cross. Masonry arches support a red sandstone tower with a slate roof and turrets at each corner. The stained glass windows of the church are exceptional, with many of Tiffany glass.

When Woodward was widened in 1936, the elaborately carved entrance porch was moved from the Woodward façade to the Edmund Place side.

A State of Michigan historical marker was placed at the site on August 26, 1980.

== Gallery ==
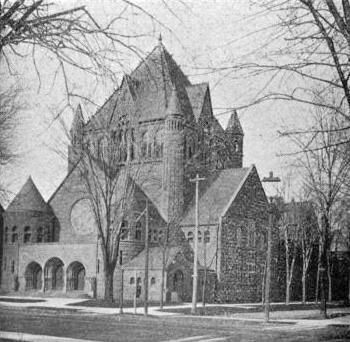
First Presbyterian Church, c. 1899

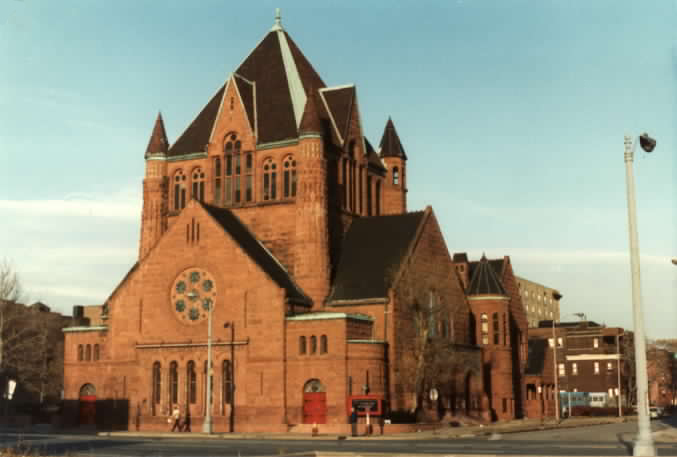
The church in 2004. Notice the massive rearrangement of the Woodward façade

== See also ==
- First Presbyterian Church (Detroit, Michigan), the historical building and lands occupied by the seminary
