= Woodward Avenue Baptist Church =

- Formerly listed on the U.S. National Register of Historic Places
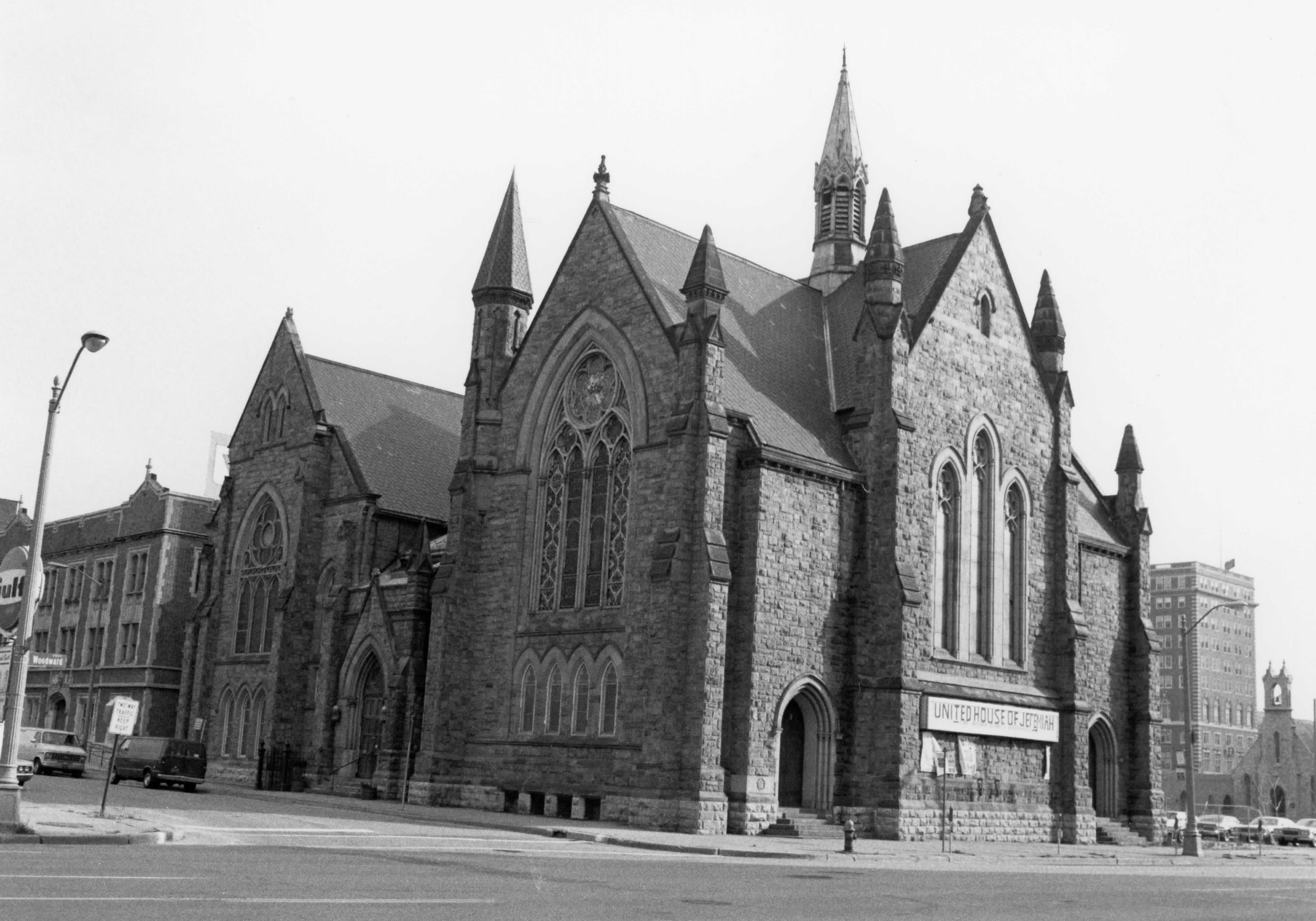
- Woodward Avenue Baptist Church, 1982
- Interactive map
- Location: 2464 Woodward Ave., Detroit, Michigan
- Coordinates: 42°20′26″N 83°3′11″W
- Area: less than one acre
- Built: 1886
- Architect: Mortimer Smith
- Demolished: 1986
- NRHP reference No.: 82002915

Significant dates
- Added to NRHP: August 3, 1982
- Removed from NRHP: 1988

The Woodward Avenue Baptist Church was a Church located at 2464 Woodward Avenue in Detroit, Michigan. It was listed on the National Register of Historic Places in 1982, but was destroyed by fire in 1986 and delisted in 1988.

== History ==
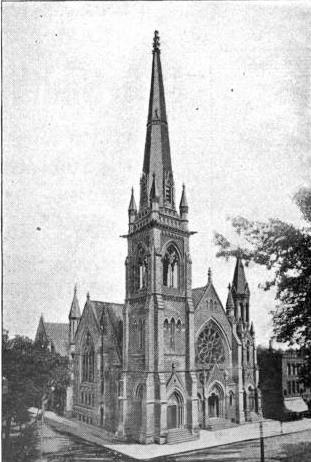
Church in 1899, with original facade

The Woodward Avenue Baptist Church congregation was organized as Lafayette Street Baptist Church in 1860. In 1886, the congregation purchased the present church site and changed its name. They hired architect Mortimer Smith to design this church. Construction began immediately, and the church building was completed in 1887. In 1934 the original facade was demolished to make way for the widening of Woodward Avenue. In 1980, the congregation sold the building to the United House of Jeremiah. The church was destroyed by fire in 1986.

== Description ==
The original Woodward Avenue Baptist Church was a Late Victorian Gothic church constructed of gray limestone and rockfaced ashlar. As originally built, it had a gabled facade with a tall corner tower. However, due to the 1935 widening of Woodward Avenue, 46 feet were cut off the front, The remaining section measured 120 feet in length and 90 feet in width, with two simple Gothic arched doors on either side of a slightly projecting pavilion. A two-story addition in the rear, measured 165 feet long by 95 feet wide.
