= Monroe Avenue Commercial Buildings =

Historic commercial buildings in Michigan, US

- U.S. National Register of Historic Places
- U.S. Historic district
- Michigan State Historic Site
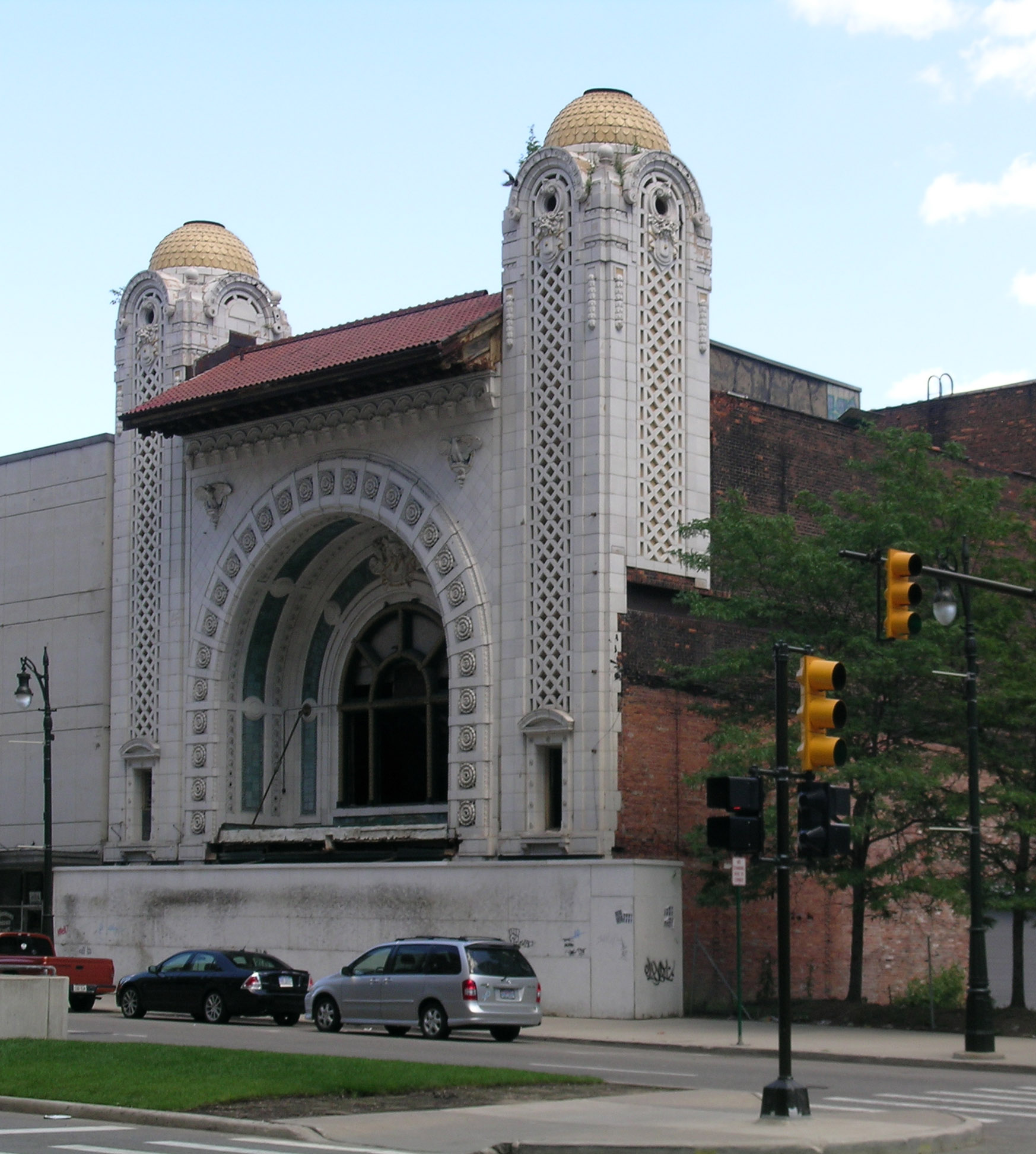
- The National Theatre (1911-2024) at 118 Monroe Ave., taken in 2008; it had been the oldest surviving theatre in Detroit, a part of the city's original theatre district from the late 1800s.
- Interactive map
- Location: Detroit, Michigan, U.S.
- Coordinates: 42°19′58″N 83°2′45″W
- Architect: Albert Kahn, Mortimer L. Smith, Sheldon Smith, Frank G. Baxter and Henry A. O'Dell
- Architectural style: Late Victorian
- NRHP reference No.: 75000968

Significant dates
- Added to NRHP: February 13, 1975
- Designated MSHS: December 18, 1974

The Monroe Avenue Commercial Buildings, also known as the Monroe Block, is a historic district located along a block-and-a-half stretch at 16-118 Monroe Avenue in Detroit, Michigan, just off Woodward Avenue at the northern end of Campus Martius. The district was designated a Michigan State Historic Site in 1974 and listed on the National Register of Historic Places in 1975. The thirteen original buildings were built between 1852 and 1911 and ranged from two to five stories in height. The National Theatre, built in 1911, was the oldest surviving theatre in Detroit, a part of the city's original theatre district of the late 19th century, and the sole surviving structure from the original Monroe Avenue Commercial Buildings historic period.

== History and significance ==
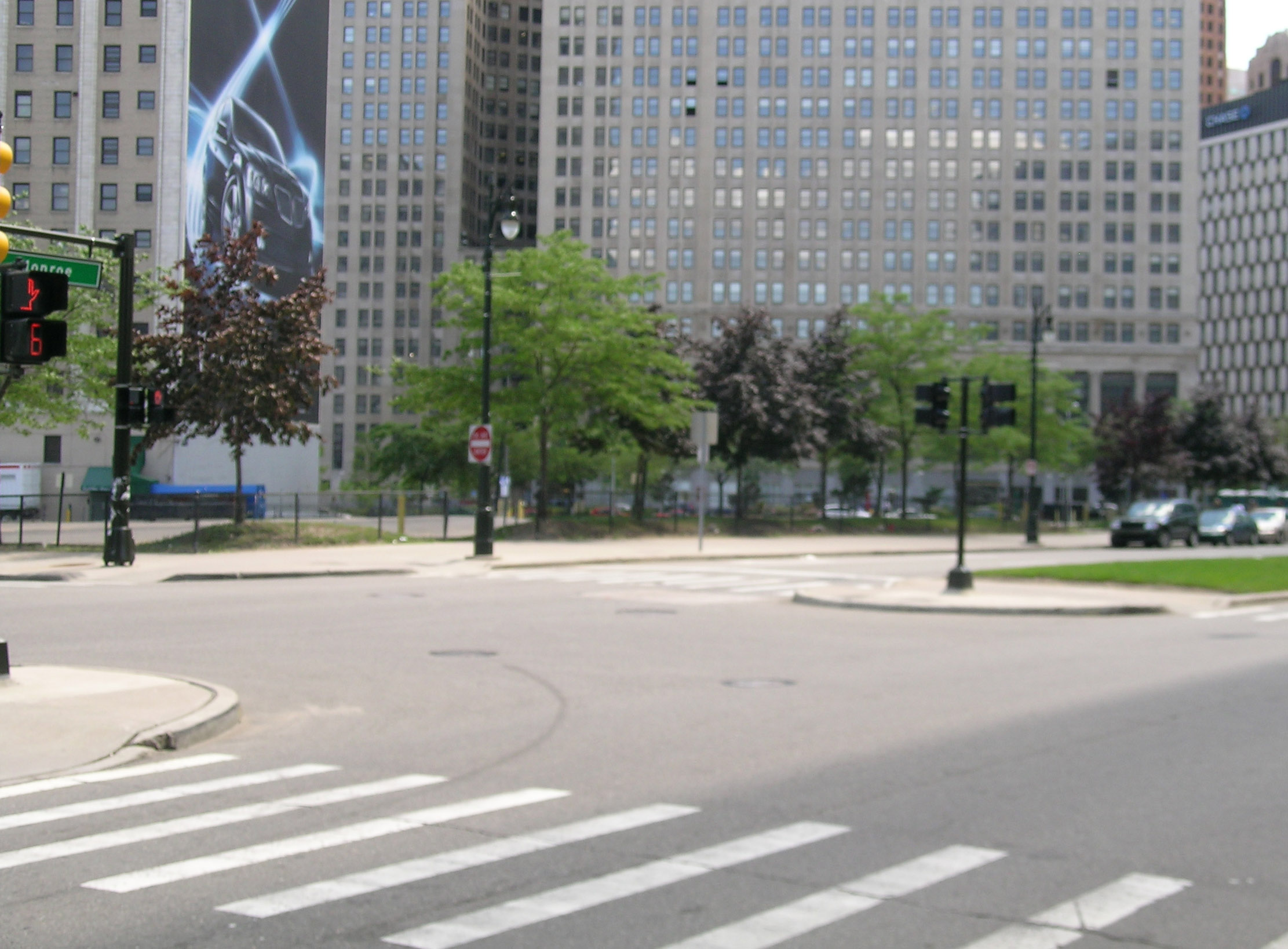
Clear block of Monroe at Woodward, 2008, where the commercial buildings once stood

The early buildings on the block were constructed in Victorian commercial style, designed by architects such as Sheldon and Mortimer Smith during the mid-to-late 19th century. The Johnson block, in particular, constituted what was at the time one of the last remaining blocks of pre-Civil War buildings in Detroit. In the nearby Randolph Street Commercial Buildings Historic District, the building at 1244 Randolph St. is a rare survivor from the 1840s. The Victorian styled Odd Fellows Building (1874) is located at the corner of Randolph and Monroe.

The Monroe buildings were occupied by numerous short-term tenants through the years, including grocers, confectioners, and saloons. In the early 20th century, a wave of European immigration brought jewelry shops, pawn shops, and tailors to the area.

At around the same time, the Campus Martius area was developing into the entertainment center of Detroit. The Detroit Opera House, then located on the north side of the Campus across Monroe Avenue from the buildings in this district, anchored the area, and, in 1901, the Wonderland vaudeville theatre moved next door.

The early 20th century was the dawn of the movie age, and in Detroit it began on Monroe Avenue. The first movie theater in Detroit, the Casino, was opened on Monroe Avenue in 1906 by John H. Kunsky. It was reputedly the second movie theatre in the world, and it propelled Kunsky to a 20-theatre empire worth $7 million in 1929. Later in 1906, Detroit's second movie theatre, the Bijou, opened literally two doors down from the Casino. These were the first of a string of theaters along this section of Monroe; three new movie theatre buildings were constructed in the area in the next five years: the Star (1907), designed by Frank G. Baxter and Henry A. O'Dell; the Columbia (1911), designed by the noted theatre architect C. Howard Crane; and the National Theater (1911), the only theatre designed by Albert Kahn. In addition, the Family Theater opened in 1914 in an older building in the district. Other nearby theaters included the Temple Theater at Woodward Avenue across Monroe, the Liberty (located behind the Star), and the Palace at 130-132 Monroe.

In the 1920s, the Detroit cinema hub centered around Grand Circus Park, with nearby Monroe Avenue receiving less attention.

The district was added to the National Register of Historic Places in 1975. In early 1990, most of the aging structures were cleared away, leaving only the National Theater as a reminder of the history of the area.

== Structures ==
The buildings that once stood in this site were a mix of pre- and post-Civil War architecture, along with a group of movie theaters from the early 20th century.

Contemporary and historical images of the block
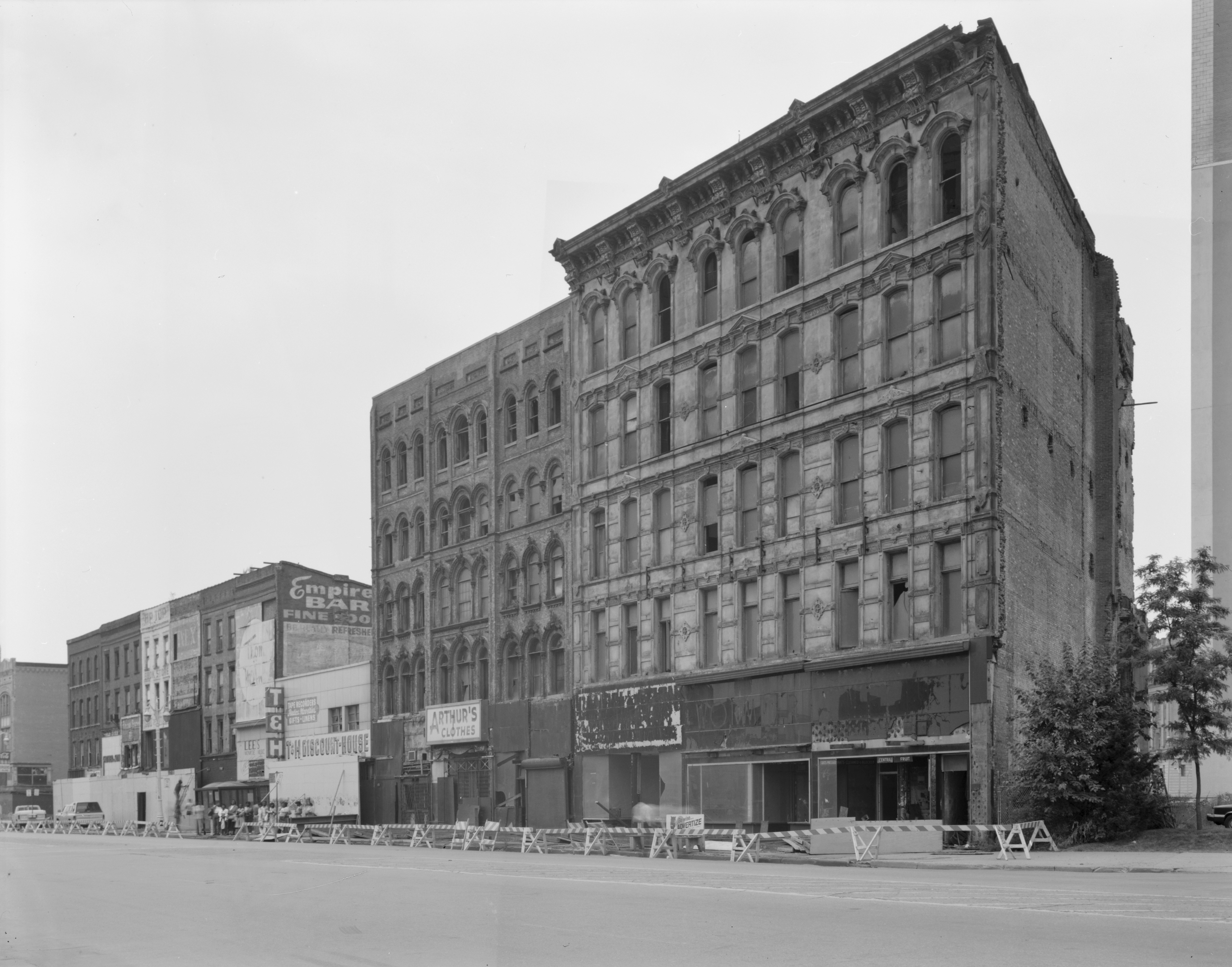
00 Block of Monroe from Woodward Avenue with the Second Williams Block at 16-30 Monroe in the foreground, 1989.

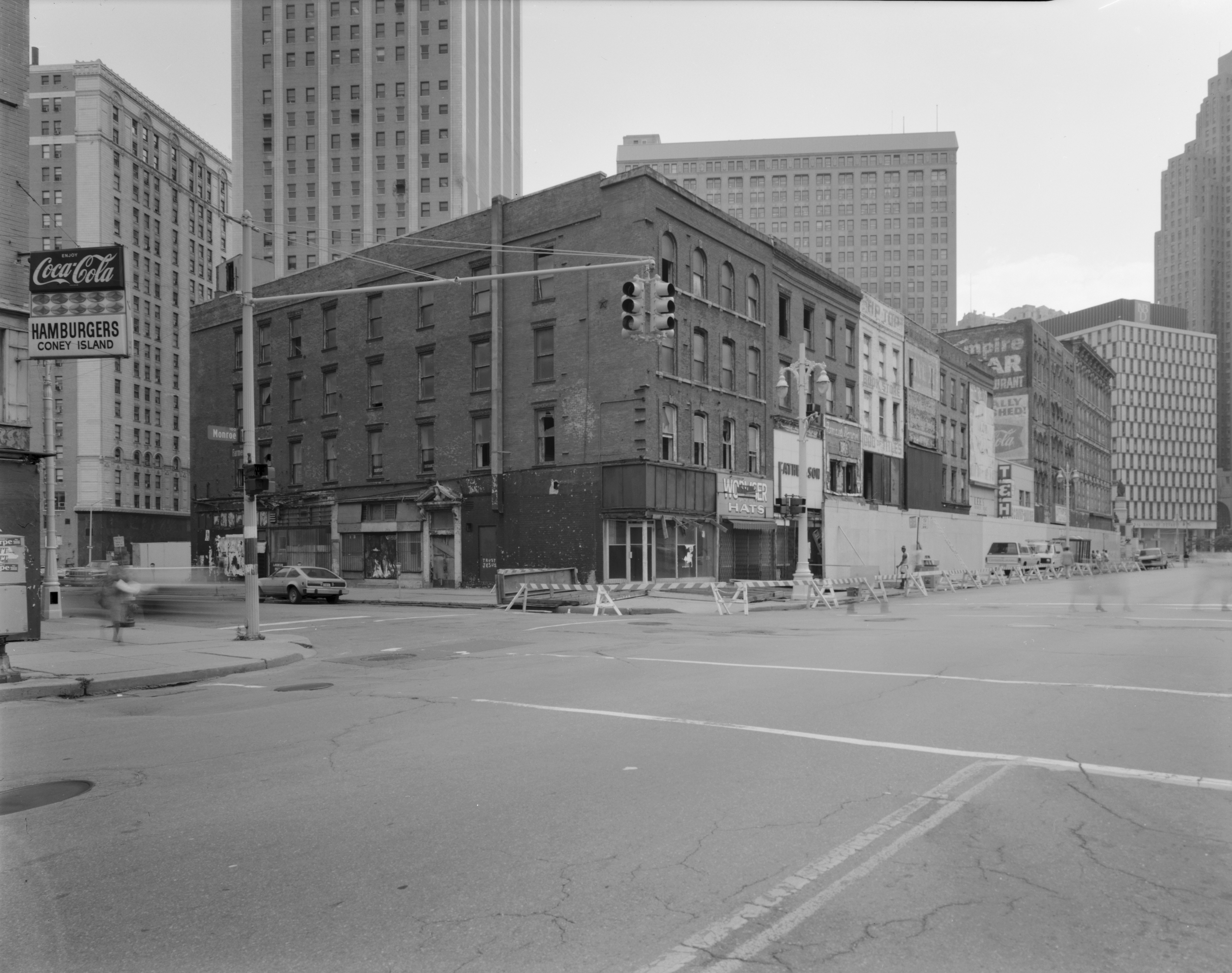
00 Block of Monroe from Farmer Street with 74-78 Monroe in the foreground, 1989.

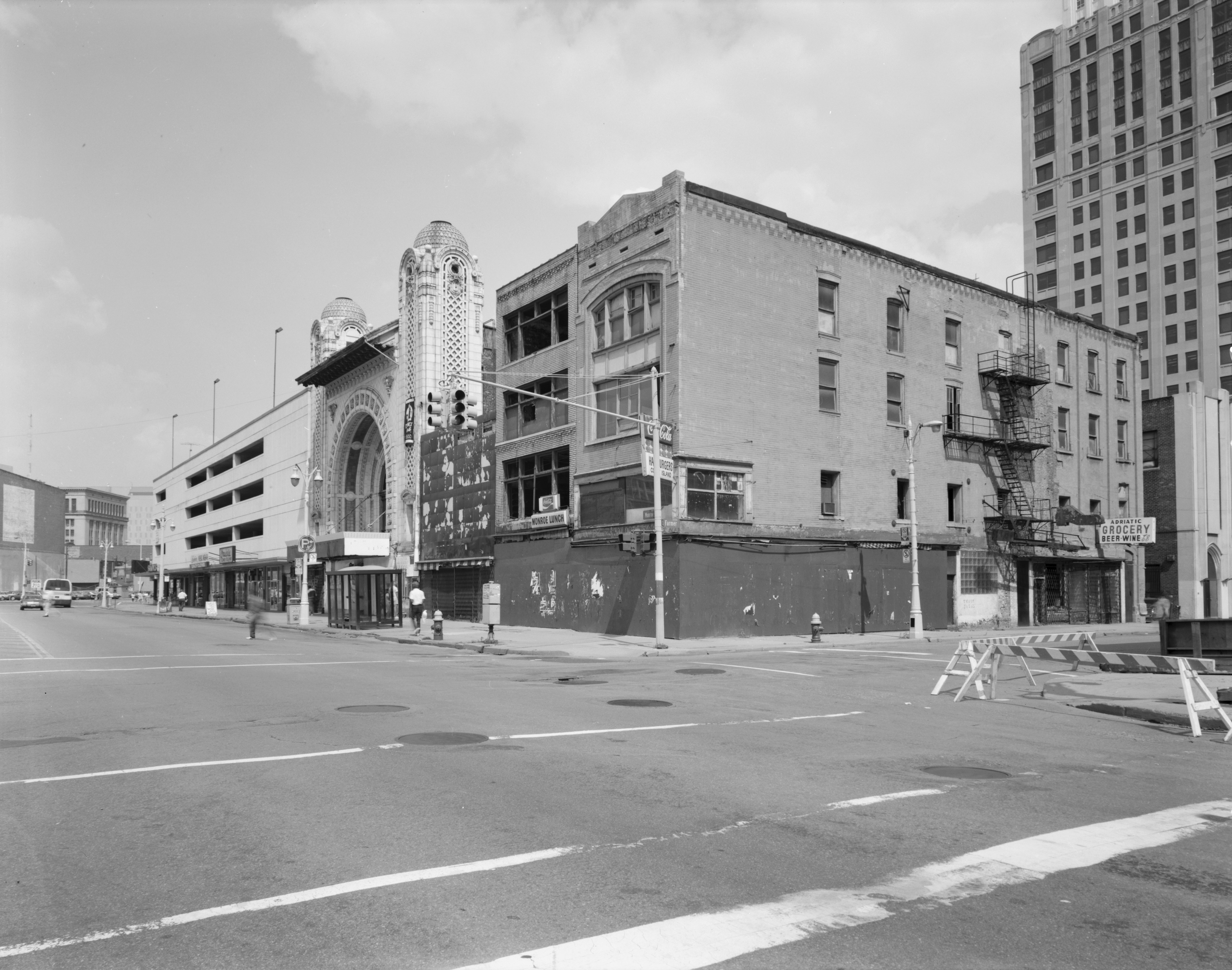
100 block of Monroe from Farmer Street with the Royal Theater (originally the Star) at 100-102 Monroe in the foreground, 1989.

=== Second Williams Block (16-30 Monroe Avenue) ===
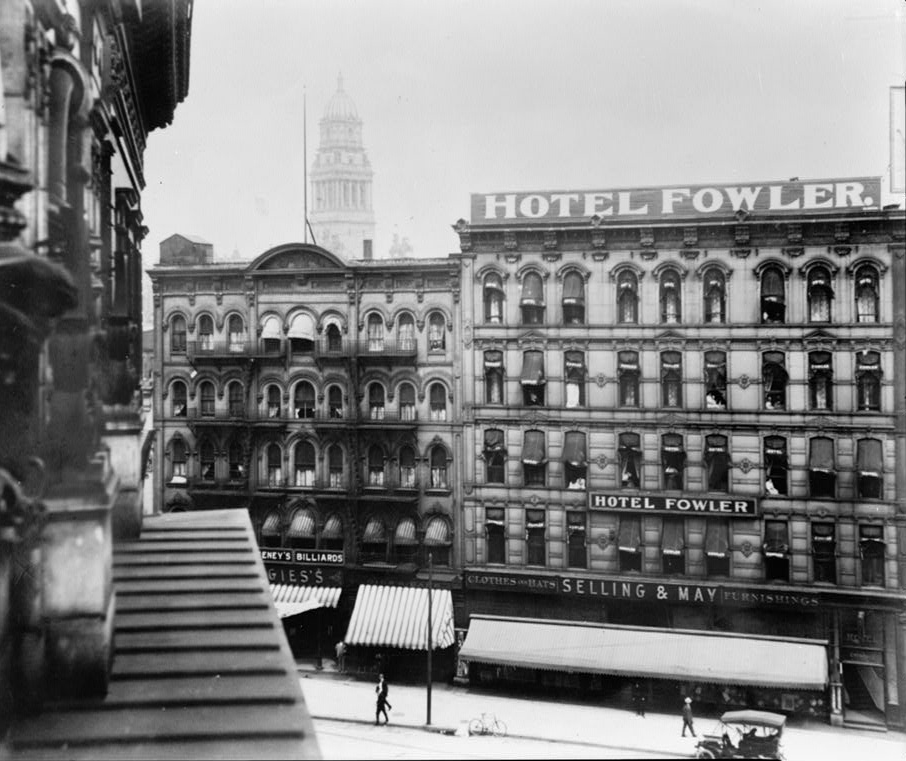
First and Second Williams Blocks, 16-30 and 32-34 Monroe, 1908.

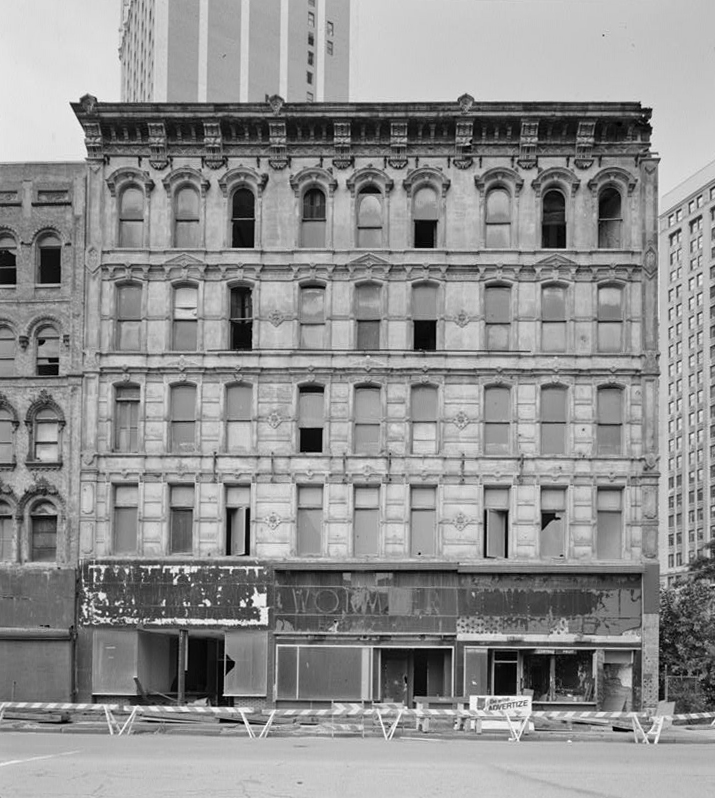
Second Williams Block, 16-30 Monroe Avenue, 1989.

John Constantine Williams, a member of one of Detroit's wealthiest mid-19th-century families and son of John R. Williams, built this structure in 1872–73, directly adjacent to his earlier structure (the first Williams block) at 32-42 Monroe. Architect Mortimer L. Smith designed the building. The building originally served as an office building, with storefronts on the ground floor. In 1880, the upper floors of the building were converted into the Kirkwood Hotel, which survived for a decade under various management. The lower floors remained commercial space. The building reverted to office space in the 1890s, then reopened as the Hotel Campus (later the Hotel Fowler) in 1901.

In 1909, most of the building was completely gutted and converted into the 934-seat Family Theater; the Family was converted to show movies in 1914. The Family stayed open through much of the century, and was renamed the Follies in 1967. Six years later, in 1973, the Follies burned to the ground. The Follies section of the building (including four of the seven bay Williams Block) was demolished soon thereafter, leaving only the three westernmost commercial and retail spaces. In the late 1970s the city vacated the property, and the remainder was demolished in early 1990.

The second Williams Block was five stories tall, divided into bays containing three windows per floor; each floor had slightly different window shapes. The building was constructed of brick, sheathed on the front with sandstone. A cast iron cornice and flat roof topped the structure. Belt courses were located above and below windows, and additional decoration consisted of bas relief carvings and cast iron entablatures.

=== First Williams Block (32-42 Monroe Avenue) ===
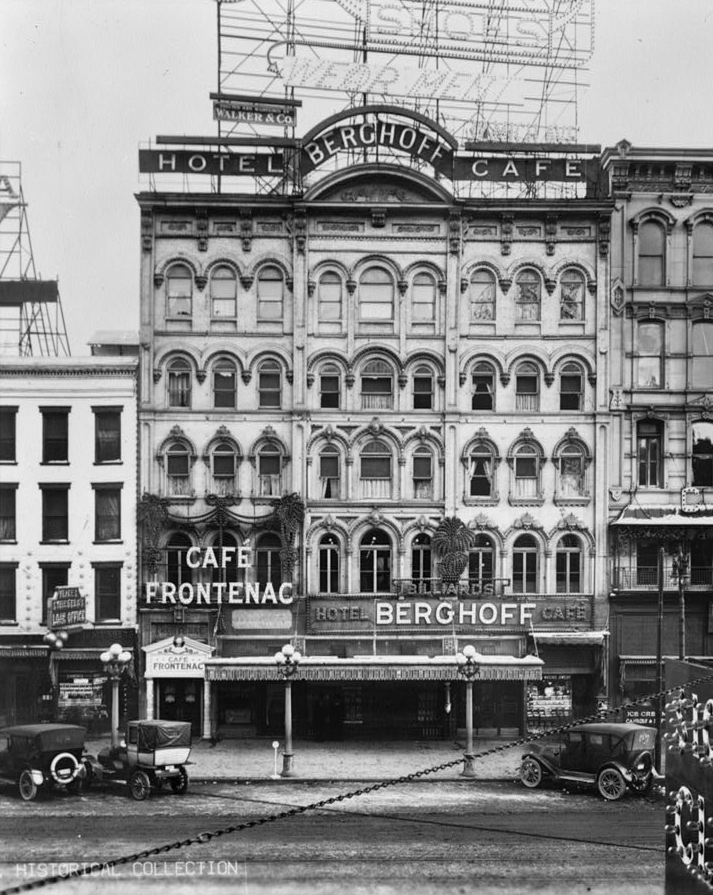
First Williams Block, 32-34 Monroe, 1915.

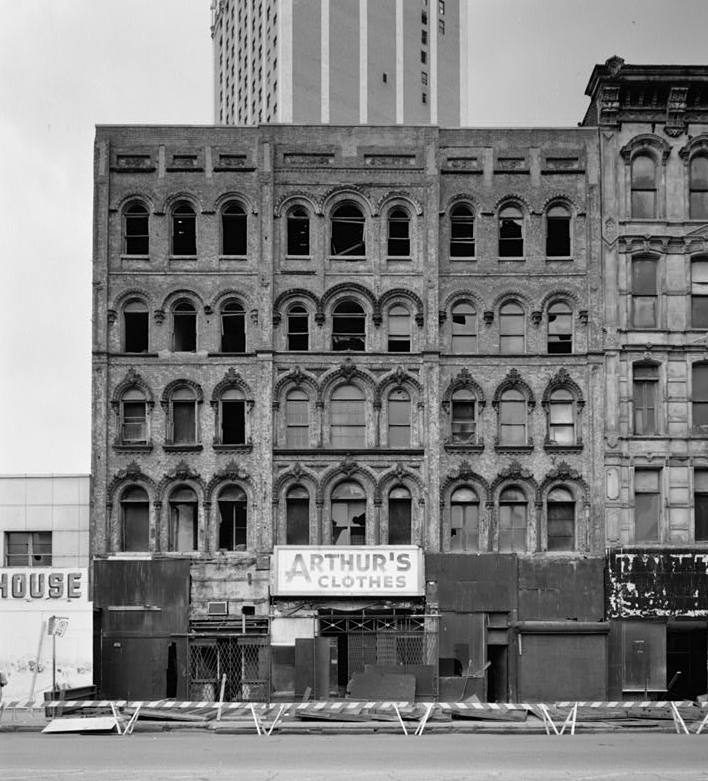
First Williams Block, 32-34 Monroe, 1989.

The first Williams block was built by John Constantine Williams in 1859, and was designed by architect Sheldon Smith. The building was originally used as an office building with commercial space on the first floor. In the late 1880s, the building was converted into a 52-room hotel, known first as the Stanwix, then as Gies' European hotel, with a restaurant on the first floor. In 1909, the hotel and restaurant was renamed the Berghoff, then the Tuxedo, and, in 1919, the Frontenac. The Hotel Berghoff was owned by Wm. D. C. Moebs & Co. who were also the proprietors of the adjoining Berghoff Cafe. In December 1913 Wm. D.C. Moebs opened the Cafe Frontenac next to the Hotel Berghoff. In 1918 the name of the hotel was changed to the Tuxedo Hotel and Grill still under the same owners. The name change was short lived because in 1919 the businesses were called the Frontenac Restaurant and the Frontenac Hotel Company still under the ownership of Wm. D.C. Moebs, President. The Frontenac Hotel remained in business through 1960. Wm. D.C. Moebs died November 16, 1921, and the once grand Frontenac Restaurant was sold to pay back taxes in 1923. By 1940, the restaurant had been replaced again with retail space, which remained in the building until the city of Detroit vacated the property in 1978. The building was demolished in early 1990.

The first Williams block was five stories tall, constructed of red brick with a flat roof, and measured 60 feet by 100 feet. The Monroe Avenue façade was separated into three bays, each with three windows. Brick was used decoratively on the façade, and cast iron crowns over the windows and column capitals accented the elevation. The original cast iron cornice was removed in 1942.

=== Columbia Theater (50 Monroe) ===
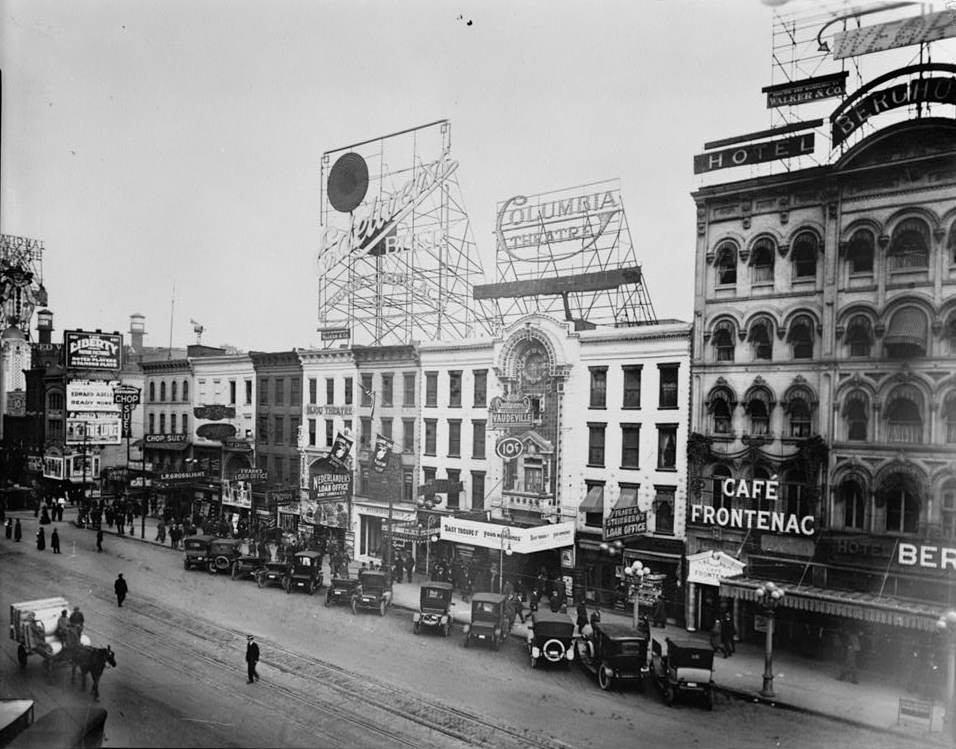
The Columbia Theater is at center with the Willams Block at right and Johnson Block at left.

The Columbia Theater was built in 1911 for John H. Kunsky, and designed by C. Howard Crane to seat over 1000 people. When built, the theater had its own pipe organ and house orchestra. The Columbia was closed in 1956, and has since been demolished.

=== Johnson Block (52-54, 58, 62, 66-68, and 70-72 Monroe Avenue) ===
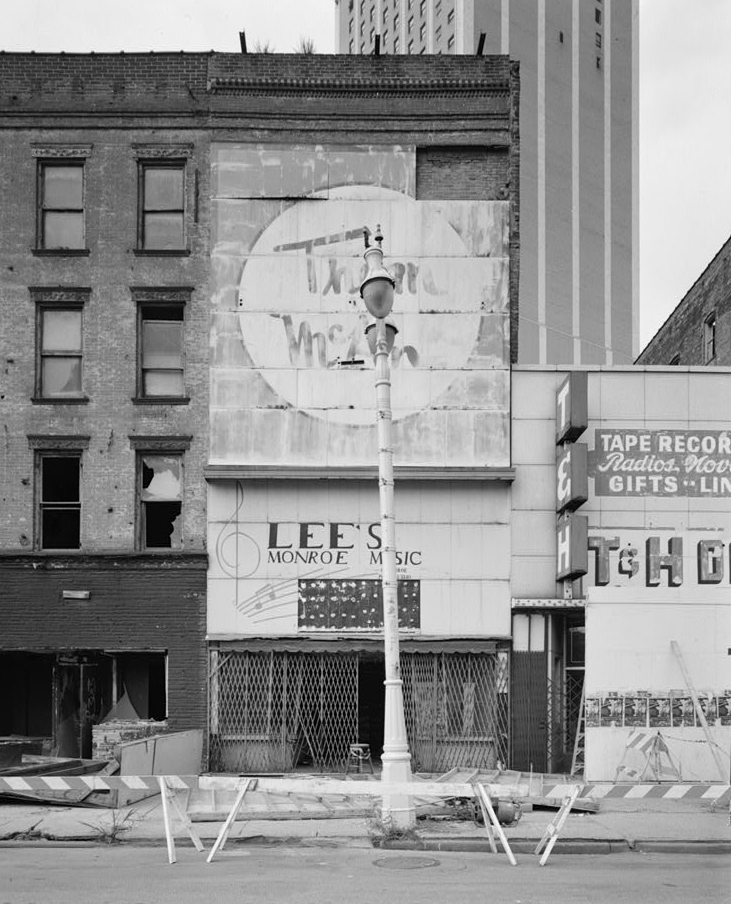
52-54 Monroe in the Johnson Block, 1989.

Hiram R. Johnson purchased land along Monroe in 1852 and constructed a series of commercial buildings collectively known as the "Johnson Block." These buildings are the five located at 52–54, 58, 62, 66–68, and 70–72 Monroe Avenue.

All five buildings were constructed of brick and stood four stories tall, and were designed in a similar fashion. The first four (52–54, 58, 62, 66-68 Monroe) measured 20 feet wide and 100 feet deep, with three windows per story on the upper levels. The last building (70-72 Monroe) measured 30 feet wide and 100 feet deep, and was divided into two bays with two windows per bay on each story. Windows in all buildings were rectangular in shape with cast iron lintels featuring a scroll and urn motif. The buildings originally had a cornice at the top; these were removed in the 20th century, most in 1958. The buildings were demolished in early 1990.

Two of these five buildings were instrumental in the establishment of the movie theater business in Detroit. In 1905, William H Klatt opened a cent-odeon (similar to the nickelodeon) in a former furniture store at 62 Monroe. The next year, John H. Kunsky opened the first true movie house in Detroit, the Casino Theater, two doors away at 70-72 Monroe. Klatt quickly converted the Bijou into Detroit's second movie house and reopened it later in 1906 as "The Bijou." The building remained a movie house for the next seventy years, changing its name to "The New Bijou" in 1918. In 1966, the New Bijou became "The Cinex," an adult movie venue; it closed in 1978. Kunsky's Casino Theater, however, closed in 1915; later tenants in the space at 70-72 Monroe included the Famous Barrel Bar and Father and Son Shoes.

Tenants of the other Johnson Block buildings were primarily small commercial establishments and eateries. The tenants of 52-54 Monroe included a series of saloons in the late 19th and early 20th centuries, a soft drink shop/restaurant from 1913 to 1928, and a series of clothing and shoe stores until the 1970s, when the building was vacated. 58 Monroe had a series of tenants, including a jewellery store at the turn of the 20th century, followed by a lunch counter, pawn broker, clothing store, and another jewellery store. The building at 66-68 Monroe housed an umbrella factory from 1888 to 1912, then a pawnbroker, shoe repair shop, men's clothiers, and a bookstore.

More Johnson block Images
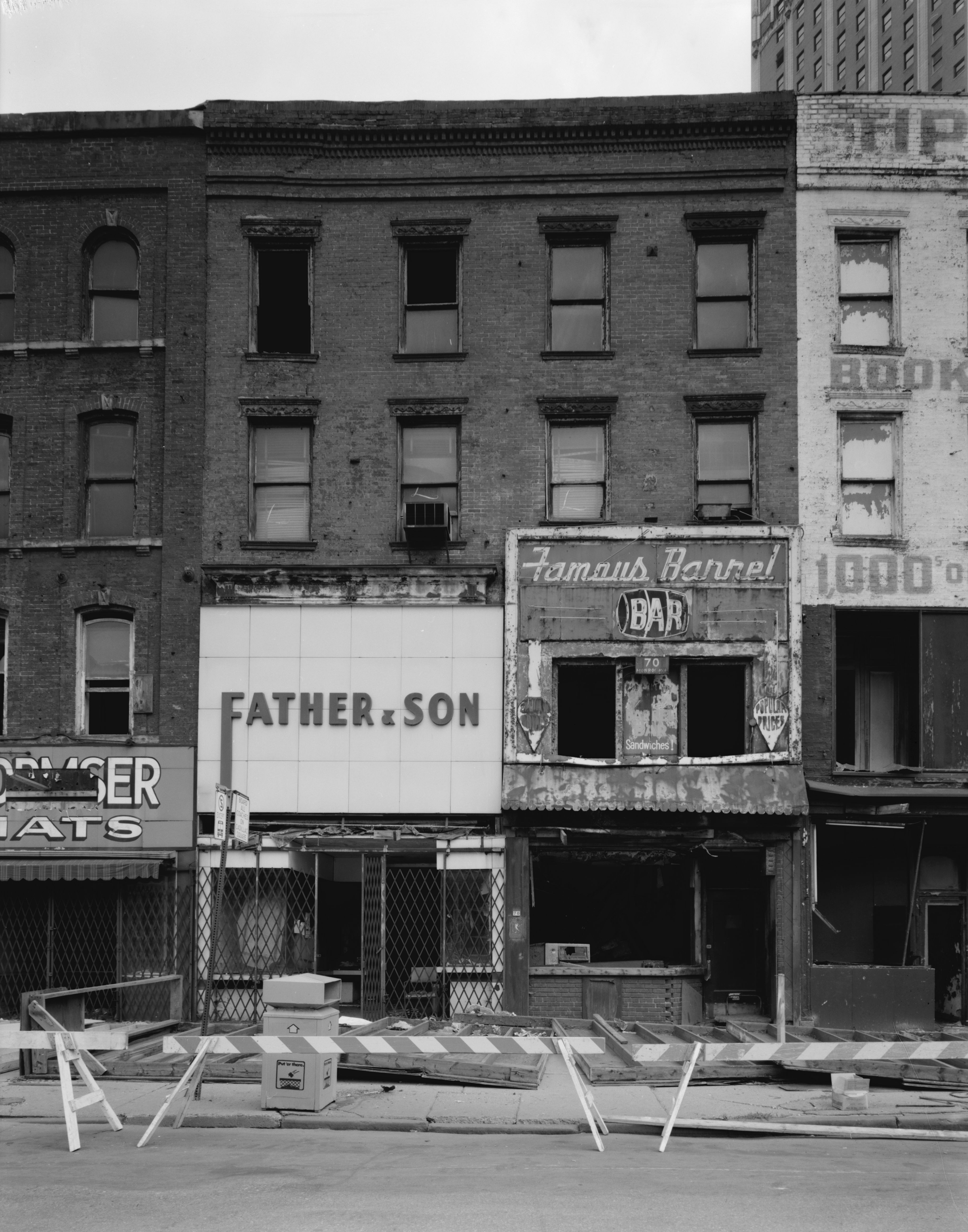
70-72 Monroe, 1989.

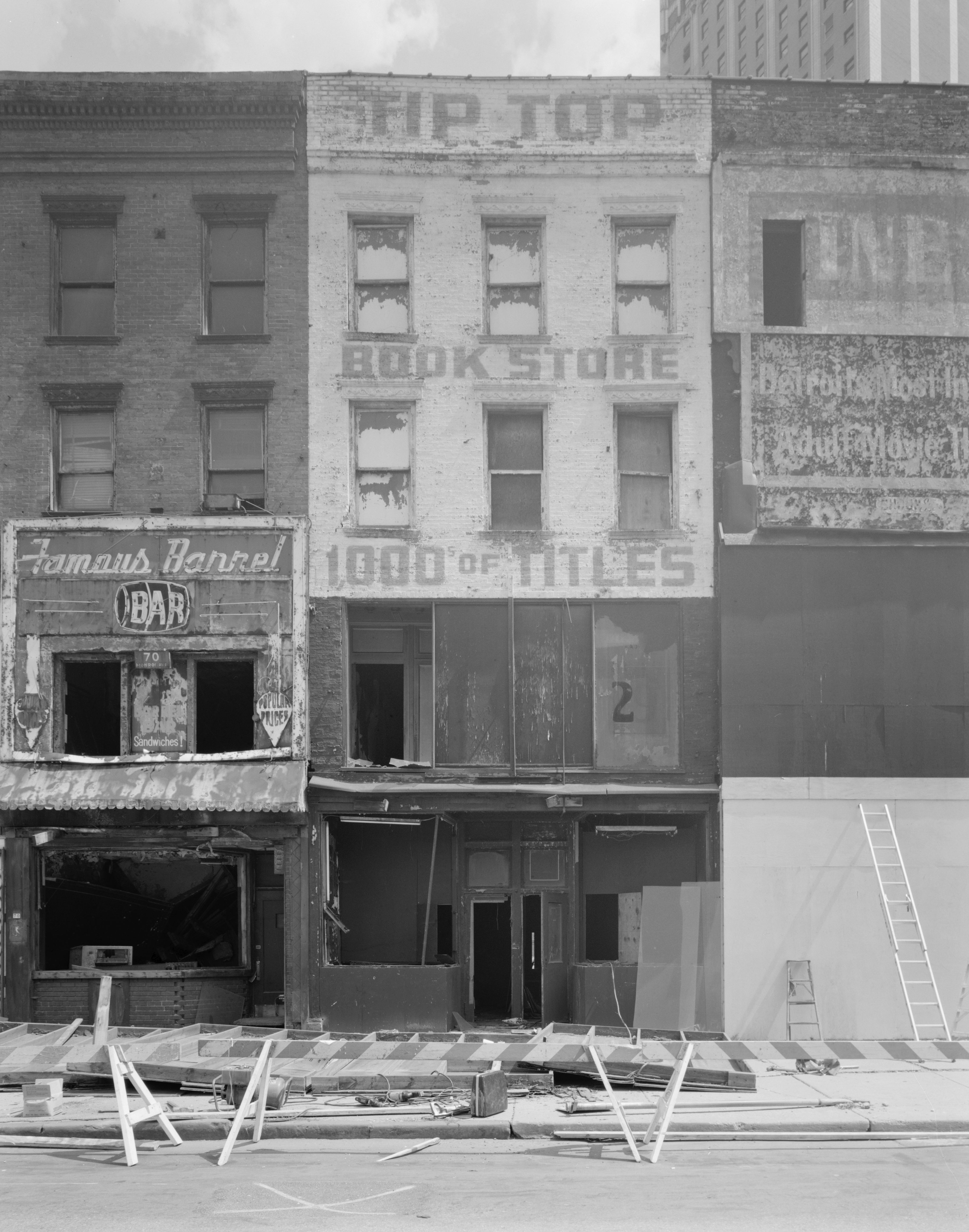
66-68 Monroe, 1989.

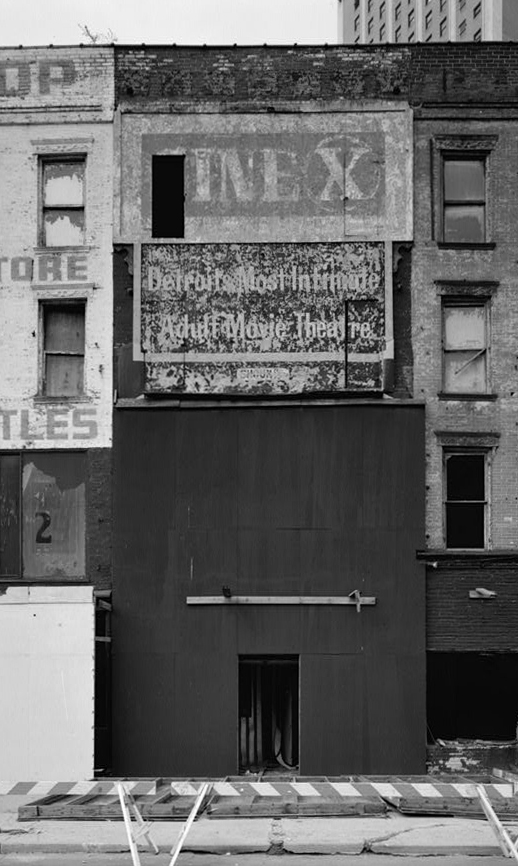
62 Monroe, 1989.

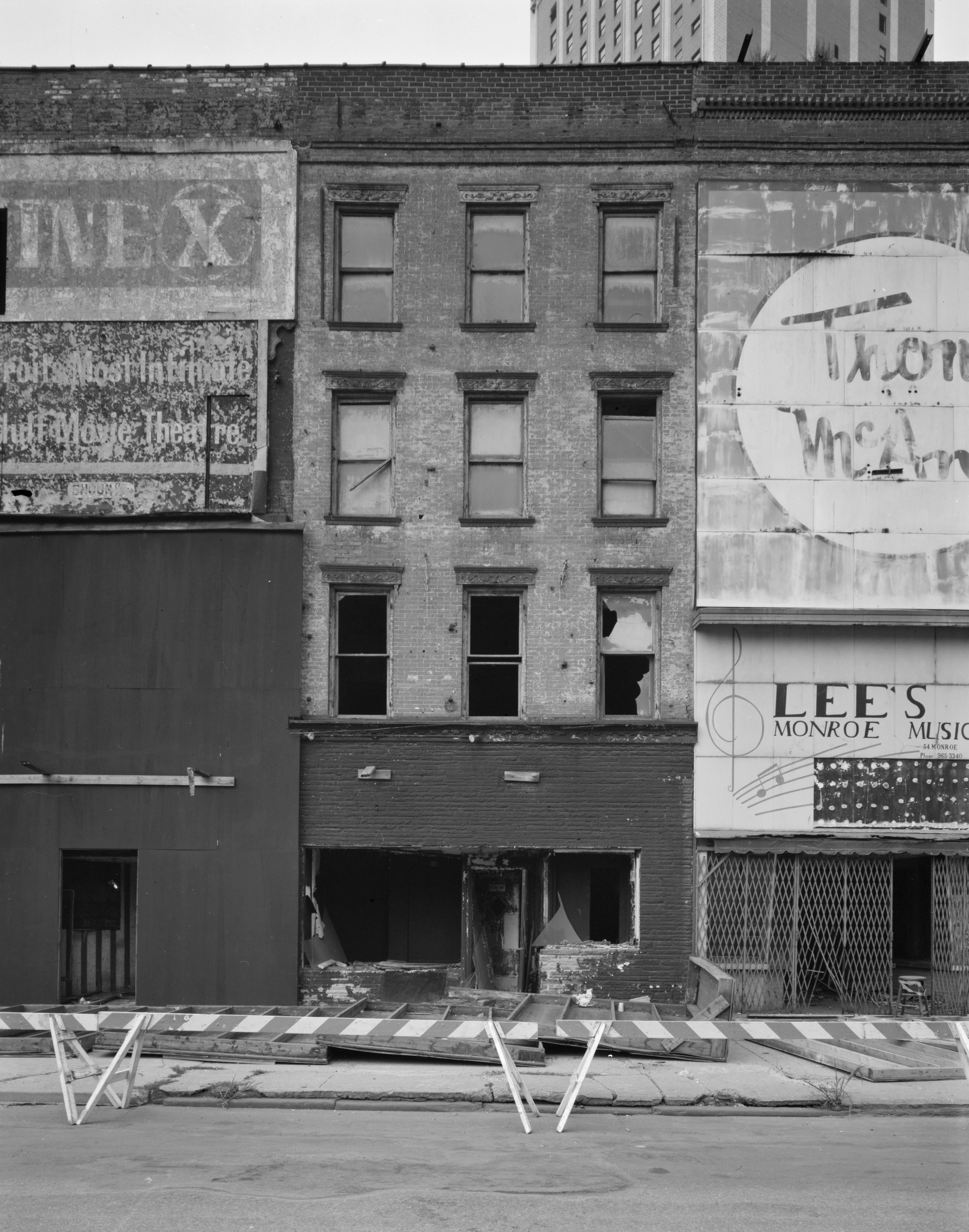
58 Monroe, 1989.

=== 74-78 Monroe Avenue ===
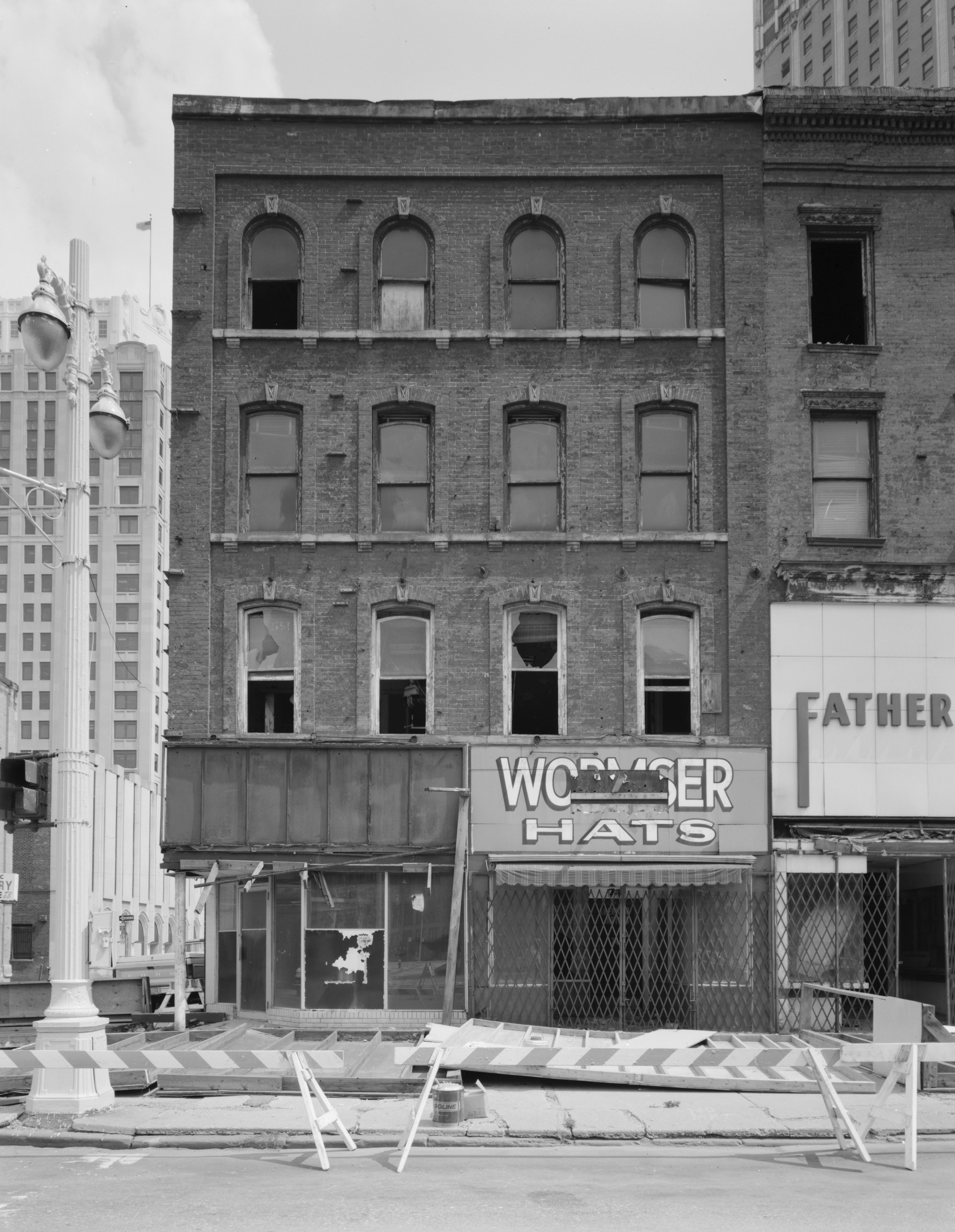
74-78 Monroe, Monroe elevation, 1989

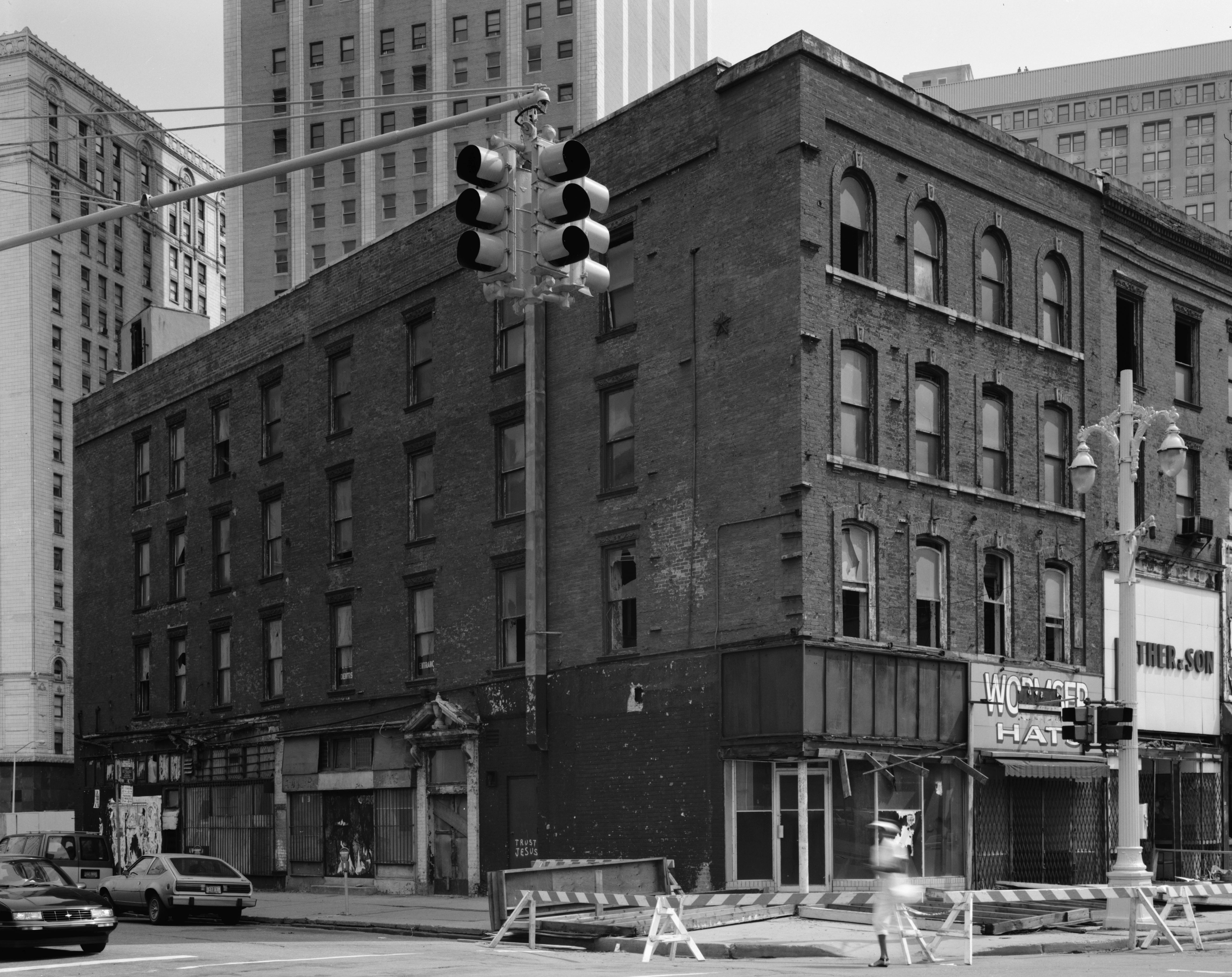
74-78 Monroe, Farmer elevation, 1989

The building at 74-78 Monroe was constructed in approximately 1852, fronting on both Monroe Avenue and Farmer Street. At the turn of the 20th century, a restaurant and saloon inhabited the first floor. Later tenants included a tailor, cigar store, and shoe stores. A barber shop operated continuously in the building from 1915 until the late 1970s, and a second-floor dentist's office existed from the 1920s through the late 1970s. The building was demolished in early 1990.

The building was originally virtually identical to the structure next door at 70-72 Monroe, including the cast iron lintels featuring an urn and scroll. The building was, however, set back four additional feet from Monroe Avenue. The building was four stories tall and constructed of red brick. Both the Monroe Avenue and Farmer Street facades had tall narrow windows with a combination of segmental and fully arched window tops, decorated with projecting brick.

=== Star (Royal) Theater (100-102 Monroe Avenue) ===
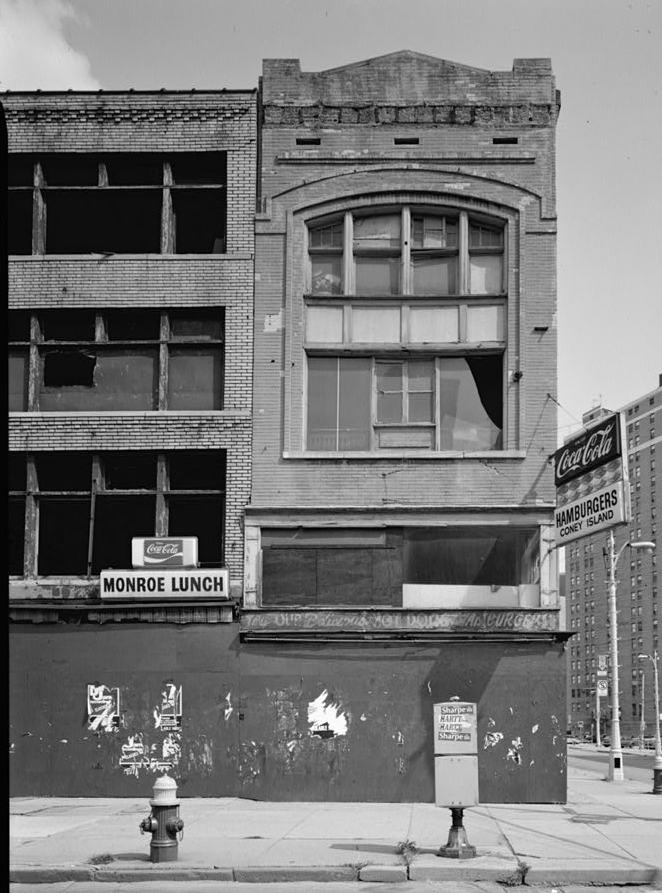
Star (Royal) Theater at 100-102 Monroe, 1989.

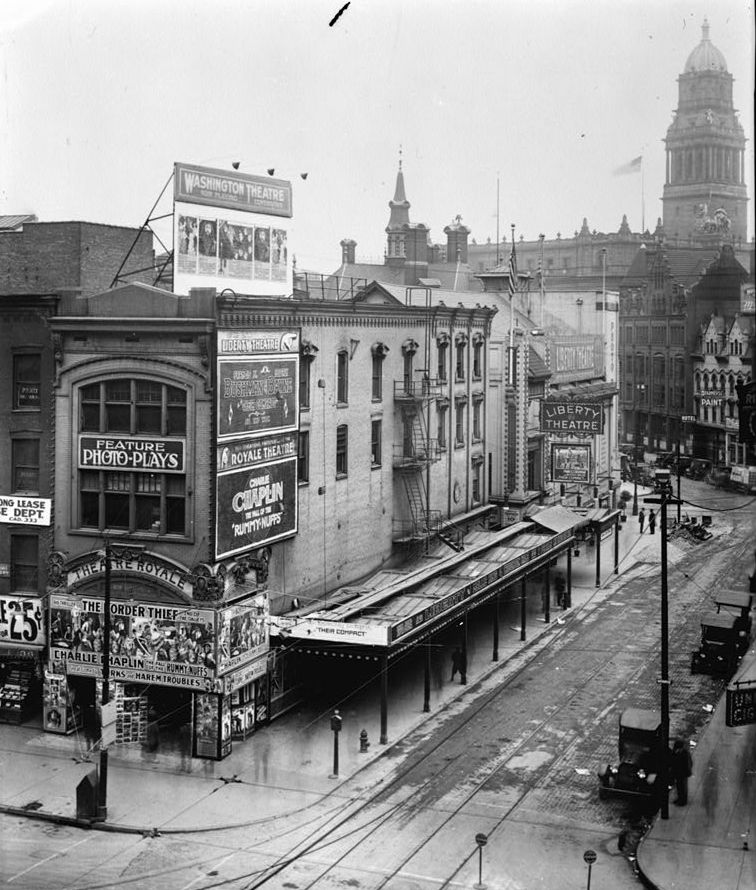
Royal Theater from the Monroe Avenue and Farmer Street corner, 1917. Note Liberty Theatre behind.

This structure was built in 1907 as the Star Theater; it was designed by Frank G. Baxter and Henry A. O'Dell. The Star operated for only a year; in 1908 the theater changed into the Theatre Royale, and in 1912 it changed to the Royal Theater. The Royal closed in 1922. Afterward, a variety of retail establishments were housed in the building, including a cigar store, jewelers, shoe store, tailor, and barber. The building was demolished in early 1990.

The Star was a four-story building, measuring 20 feet wide and 100 feet deep, constructed of red brick, with yellow brick veneer. A large arched window on the Monroe facade fills the third and fourth stories. This facade originally had a thick cornice supported by scrolled brackets, and a decorative arch above the entrance. Seven rectangular windows per story are on the Farmer elevation. The theater space originally took up both the first and most of the second stories, and thus there was only a single window on the second floor at the rear. However, in 1922 after the closure of the Royal, the second story was extended all the way forward to the Monroe facade, adding windows along the Farmer elevation.

=== 104-106 Monroe Avenue ===
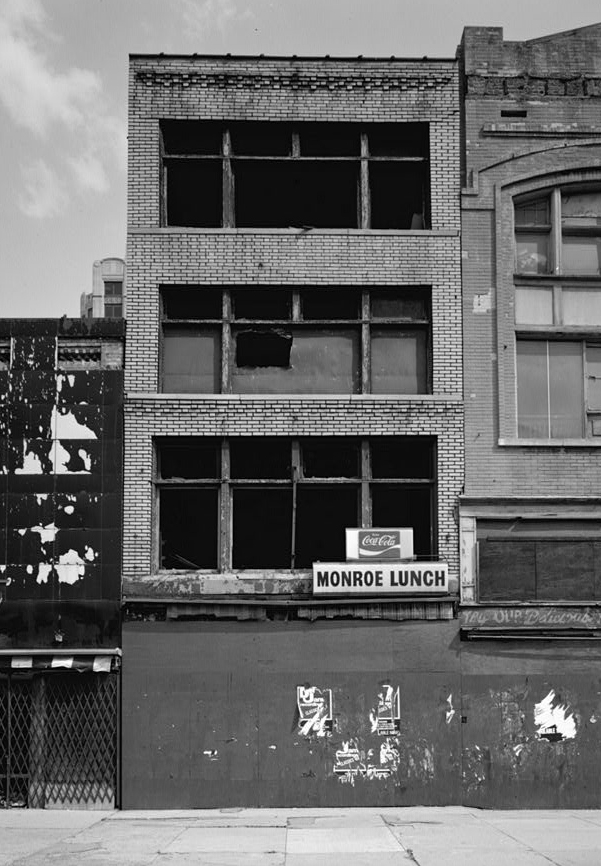
104-106 Monroe, 1989.

The building at 104-106 Monroe was constructed in approximately 1900. A saloon was the first tenant, followed by a tea store. For most of the life of the building, until it was vacated in the 1970s, ground-floor tenants included a lunch room and a clothing or shoe store. The building was demolished in early 1990.

The structure was four stories tall, 20 feet wide and 60 feet deep. The building originally had modest Italianate elements. However, the front facade was reworked in 1923, with the addition of white brick facing and alteration of the windows to large plates of glass.

=== National Theatre (118 Monroe Avenue) ===
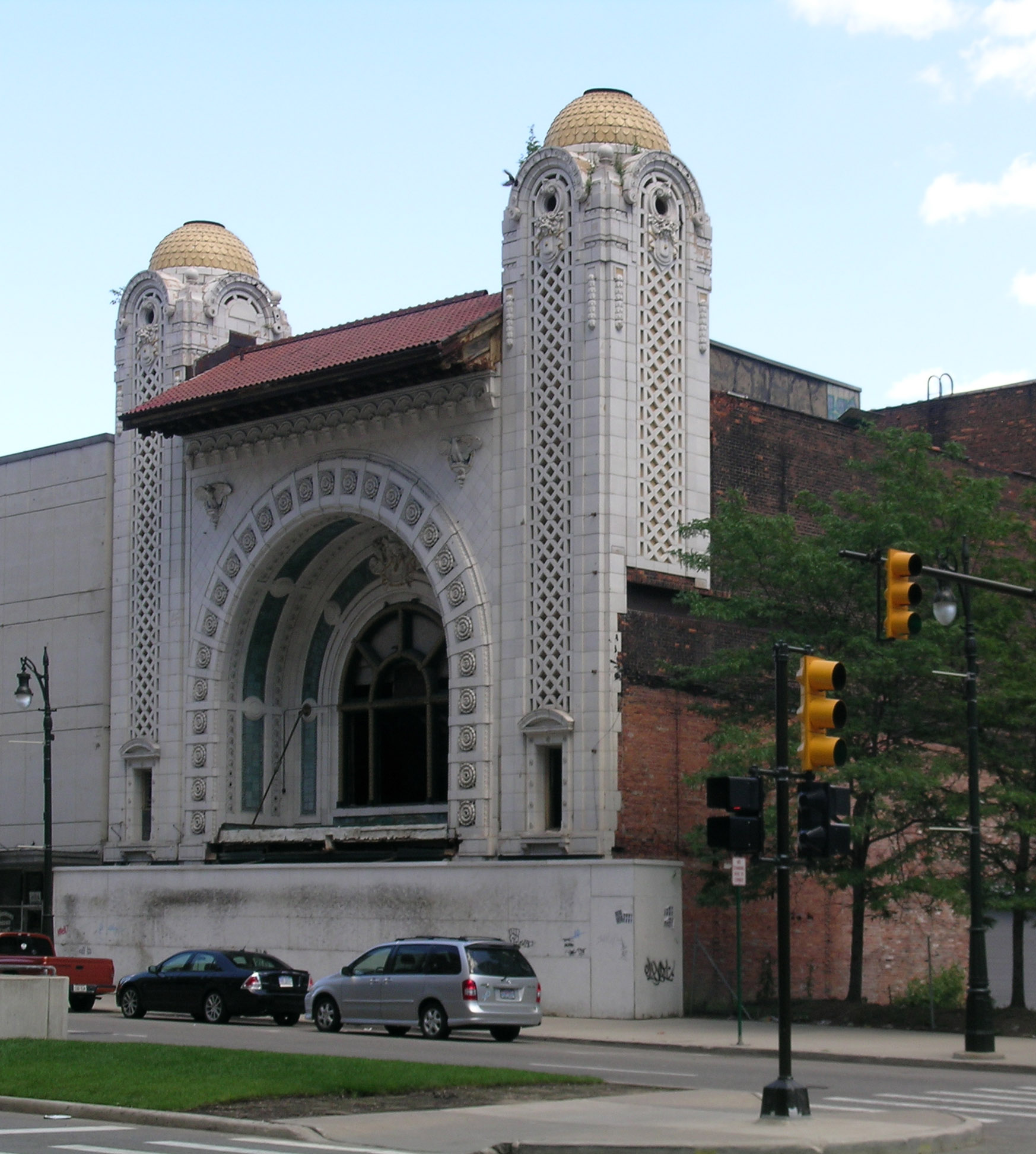
National Theatre at 118 Monroe, 2008

The 800-seat National Theater, built in 1911, was the only known theatre designed by Albert Kahn and had been oldest surviving theatre from the city's original theatre district of the 19th century. It operated as a movie theater until the 1920s, when competition from larger movie houses forced a change to a vaudeville venue. The National survived as a burlesque and adult entertainment theater until it closed in the 1970s.

The front façade of the National was dominated by an enormous arch flanked with twin towers and covered with white and blue terra cotta tiles. The façade had hundreds of lightbulbs built in, which accentuate the architectural features when lit. The National Theater was an outstanding example of Modernistic design, boasting a pair of terra cotta latticework towers, arched art glass windows, and colored Pewabic tiles on the façade.

The National Theatre was demolished in January 2024 to make way for a future development. Its historic facade was dismantled and is being preserved for reuse in that development, while the rest of Kahn's only surviving theater was destroyed.
