= Randolph Street Commercial Buildings Historic District =

Historic district in Michigan, United States

- U.S. National Register of Historic Places
- U.S. Historic district
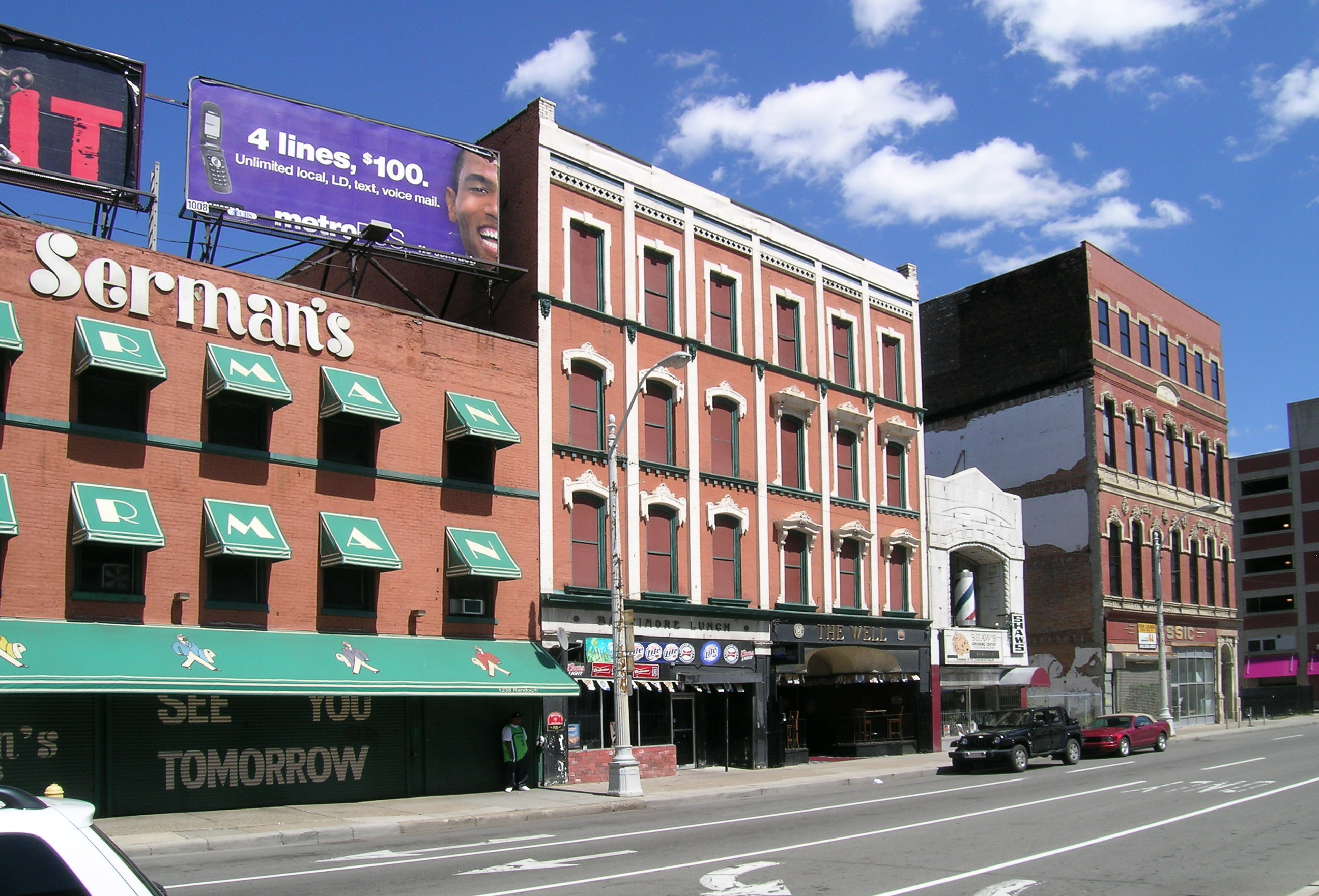
- 1208–1244 Randolph Street (address numbers count from right)
- Interactive map
- Location: Detroit, Michigan, U.S.
- Coordinates: 42°20′4″N 83°2′42″W
- Built: 1840
- Architectural style: Italianate
- NRHP reference No.: 80004404
- Added to NRHP: July 8, 1980

The Randolph Street Commercial Buildings Historic District is a historic district located in Downtown Detroit, Michigan, which includes six buildings along Randolph Street between Monroe and Macomb streets (1208–1244 Randolph Street). The district was listed on the National Register of Historic Places in 1980. The collection of buildings are a rare surviving set of Detroit Victorian-era commercial structures. The Randolph Street Commercial Building Historic District joins the Broadway Avenue Historic District downtown.

== History ==
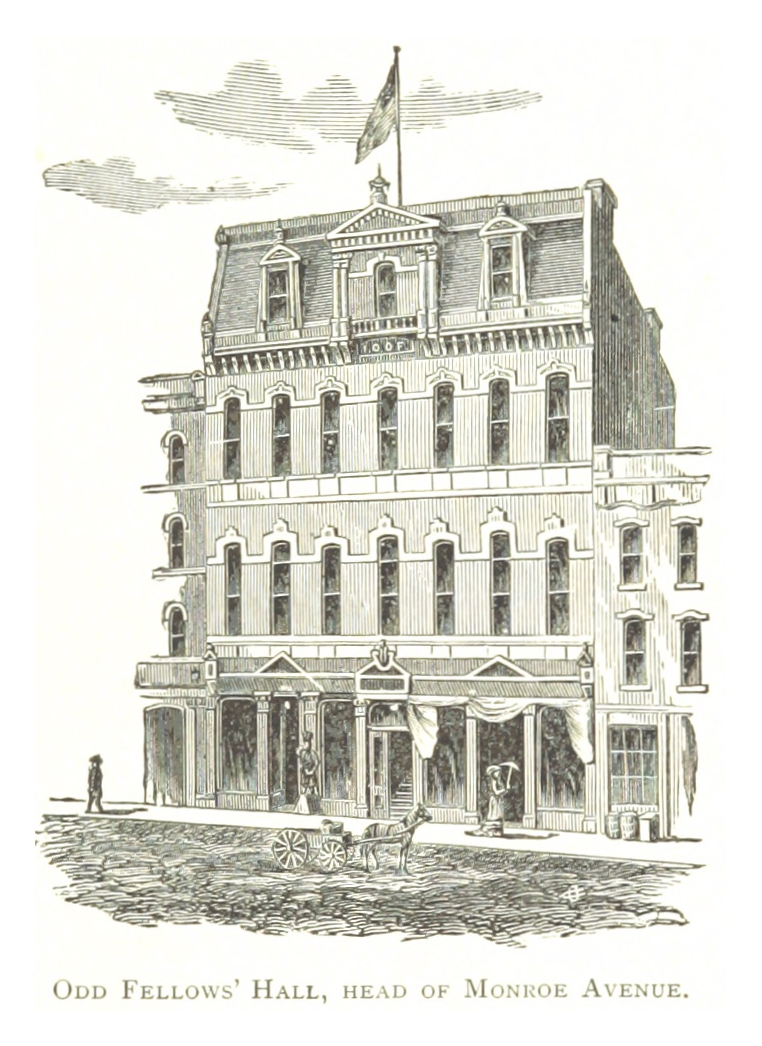
The Odd Fellows Building in an 1884 drawing by Silas Farmer. The fourth-story façade was later remodeled

Buildings along this section of Randolph Street have been used for retail since the area was first built up in the 1840s. The building at 1236–1244 Randolph was built during the period of original construction, and is a rare survivor from the 1840s. The Victorian styled Odd Fellows Building (1874) is located at the corner of Randolph and Monroe.

As the city grew, larger commercial buildings were required and the other structures on Randolph were constructed. The area remained a shopping district into the twentieth century.

Over the years, the street-level facades of the buildings in the district were altered numerous times, two structures had new top stories added, and a cornice removal program in the 1950s resulted in the loss of all the fine bracketed entablatures. However, the buildings still have their Victorian brickwork and metal window hoods.

Since construction of the buildings, structures in the district have housed numerous commercial enterprises, ranging from legal offices, to tailors to sculptors. In the early 1900s, the district was home primarily to dry goods and clothing establishments.

== Description ==
In the Victorian era, this block featured seven adjacent buildings. The St. Claire Hotel, originally at the corner of Randolph and Monroe, was demolished at some point before 1980; the building at 1224 Randolph was demolished in 1929 and replaced. The six buildings within the district when it was listed in 1980 are:

- 1208 Randolph (Odd Fellows Hall): This building is a four-story seven-bay example of high Victorian Italianate architecture, and was constructed by the Odd Fellows in 1874. The ground floor contains window display, while the second story window treatment includes alternating window heights, stone coping and stone hood moulds. The topmost floor of the facade was extensively remodeled from its original appearance in about 1900.
- 1218 Randolph: The four-story Victorian commercial structure at this location, probably constructed in 1872, was demolished at some point after 1980. It was a four-story, Victorian commercial structure.
- 1224 Randolph: In 1874, a four-story Victorian commercial structure, almost a replica of 1218, was constructed here as the Laitner Brush Factory. In 1929 it was demolished and replaced with a two-story, white marble branch bank building. The second floor has a recessed arched window enframed with a wide marble rope molding.
- 1228–1230 Randolph: This Victorian commercial structure was probably built about 1870. It is three bays wide by four stories high, with vertical pilasters separating the bays. The second and third story window caps are pressed metal and project out from the facade.
- 1232–1234 Randolph: This Victorian commercial structure is a virtual twin to the one at 1228/30, and was built at about the same time. The second and third story window are simpler than the ones next door.
- 1236–1244 Randolph: This structure is a composite of three three-story buildings which have been slowly consolidated into one over time. A smaller building at 1236 adjoins the main three-bay-wide building in the center. An addition expanded the building to the corner. Although the facades of the buildings have lost any architectural distinction, the two older buildings likely date from the 1840s.
