= Myron G. Barlow =

American figurative painter (1873–1937)

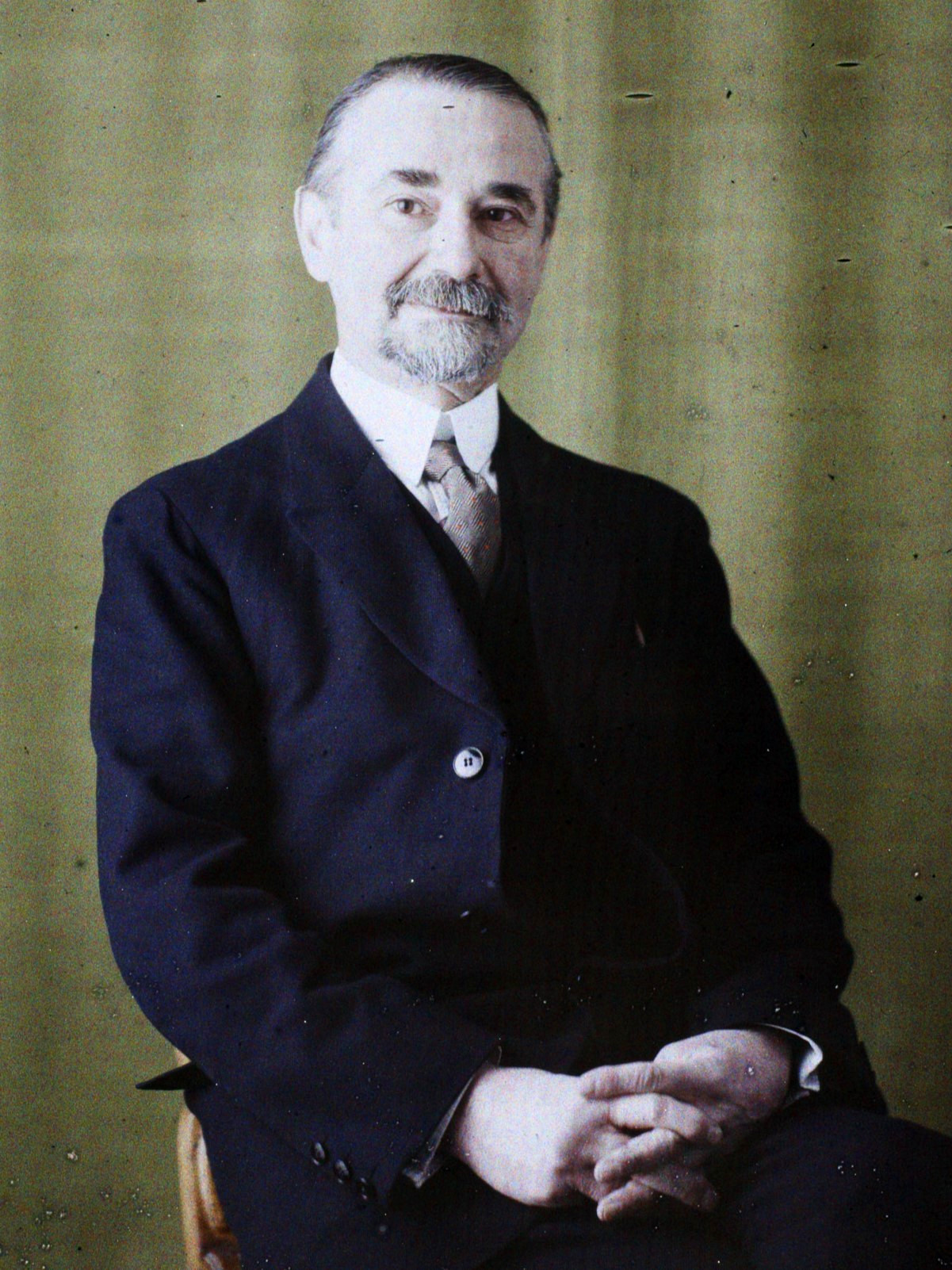
- Autochrome by Georges Chevalier, 1930
- Born: April 15, 1870 (Note: Although his passport give his birthdate as "on or about the 15th day of April 1873" Myron Barlow appeared on the 1870 census in Ionia Michigan, with a birth month of May.); Ionia, Michigan, U.S.
- Died: August 14, 1937 (aged 67); Étaples, France
- Resting place: Étaples
- Education: Detroit Museum of Art School; Joseph Gies (teacher); Chicago Art Institute; Charles Edward Boutwood (teacher); Académie Colarossi; Beaux-Arts de Paris; Jean-Léon Gérôme (teacher)
- Known for: paintings
- Style: Genre painting
- Movement: Société Nationale des Beaux-Arts; Etaples art colony
- Awards: 1894 First prize, Académie Colarossi; 1904 Gold Medal, Louisiana Purchase Exposition for The Gossips; 1907 Elected member of the Salon Champ Mars, of the Societe National des Beaux Arts, Paris; 1912 made a Societaire in the Société Nationale des Beaux-Arts; Year needs clarified Gold Medal Paris Salon of Société Nationale des Beaux-Arts; 1915 Gold Medal Panama-Pacific Exposition, American art section for Apples.; Legion of Honour 1932 Knight (Chevalier)

Myron G. Barlow (1870 – 1937) was an American figurative painter known for his paintings of the lives of rural French women. A gold medalist in international art exhibitions, he had a home at the Etaples art colony (the colony a place in France in which American artists converged before World War 1). He was friend to Henry Ossawa Tanner. He also remained a resident of Detroit.

== Biography ==
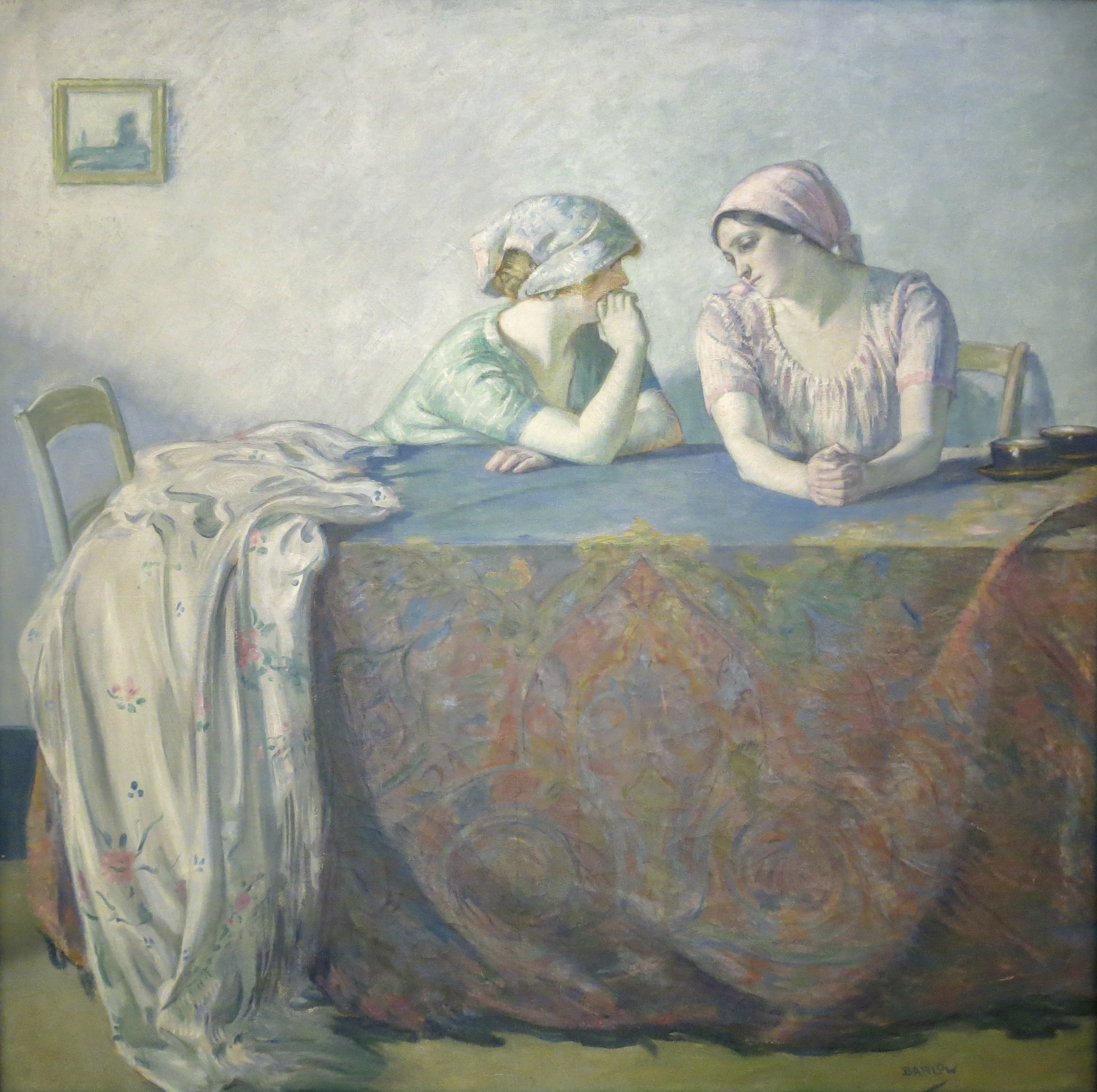
Confidences, circa 1910. Barlow had another painting called Confidences featuring 3 women around a table, sold in 1912.

Myron G. Barlow was born on April 15, 1873 in Ionia, Michigan of the marriage of Adolph and Fanny Barlow. His father had been born in Breslau, Germany, immigrating to the United States in 1849 and serving in the Union Army with the 5th Michigan Infantry Regiment during the Civil War. Barlow trained at the Detroit Museum School (later the Detroit Fine Arts Academy), where he studied with Joseph W. Gies (1860–1935). He began his career as a "sketch artist" on the staff of the Detroit Free Press. He would also study at the Art Institute of Chicago.

Barlow left for Europe in 1893 to study, and, upon his arrival in France at the age of twenty-one, was noticed by William Bouguereau. He enrolled at the École des Beaux-Arts in Paris where he was a student of Jean-Léon Gérôme. In Amsterdam he discovered Johannes Vermeer while reproducing paintings at the Rijksmuseum Amsterdam. His paintings have been compared to Vermeers, many featuring women set into a "dreamlike atmosphere", caught frozen in a moment, with the image dominated by an overall color. An overall theme throughout his paintings is the depiction of "the luxury of the poor." Another critic described his art as showing the quiet "resignation of feminine labor."

Around 1900 in France, Barlow settled in Trépied, near Étaples and joined the Étaples school of painters. He used three models in this period; Julie Sailly, Louise Descharles (born in 1909) whom he would paint for twenty years, and her sister Marie. Possibly he had more than one Louise as a model, or one model had three names over time; Louise Perrault, Louise Grandidier and Louise Descharles were all cited as Barlow's model.

He ran an art school in Etaples. Among his students was James S. Booth.

Barlow was a regular exhibitor in the Paris Salon of the Société Nationale des Beaux-Arts (National Society of Fine Arts), and his name was used in newspapers in the United States to denote American participation in the event. In 1907, he was the only American elected to the society. Like the Société des Artistes Français, which put on the Paris Salon, the Société Nationale des Beaux-Arts was a professional association which put on art exhibitions. He became a full member of the society in 1915, when his paintings won the gold medal. He exhibited consistently over years, and it was noted that critiques of Salon works often found time to mention his paintings.

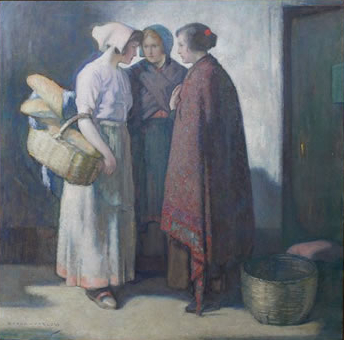
The Gossips. Possibly the 1904 award-winning painting.

In 1914, he was a founding member of a group in France calling themselves the American Artists Association, along with Frederick Carl Frieseke, Richard E. Miller, Myron Barlow, George Elmer Browne, Max Bohm, Henry Ossawa Tanner, Walter Griffin, John Noble, Charles Hawthorne and George Oberteuffer.

Barlow returned temporarily to the United States when the German army in World War 1 overran the area he lived in, near Belgium. His work was part of a group of American paintings brought from France to San Francisco on the Navy ship U.S.S. Jason, for exhibition in the Panama-Pacific Exhibition. For that show, he exhibited the same paintings which won him full membership in the Société Nationale des Beaux-Arts, and they won the gold medal at the Panama-Pacific Exhibition as well.

He lived for a period in "artist's colony", whose members included Joseph Gies (one of Barlow's former teachers), Frances Paulus, Ivan Swift, and John Morse.

In Detroit, he was president of the Scarab Club around 1918. Among his major accomplishments were four large murals which he painted for the main auditorium of Temple Beth-El, completed in 1925.

He is recognized for his work with gold medals at the St. Louis and Panama Pacific exhibition, and for having his works purchased by numerous international museums, including the Quentovic Museum in Étaples in France, the Pennsylvania Academy of Fine Arts and the Detroit Institute of Arts. The Detroit Club and the private collection of Baron Edmond de Rothschild include works by Barlow.

After World War 1, he returned to France in May 1920.

Barlow lived both in Etaples and in Detroit. While his primary home was to become Etaples, he continued to interact with the Detroit community, making trips back. At the end of his life, living in Detroit, his final trip to Etaples was with the intention of selling his house there, to spend his final years in Detroit. He died in France on 14 August 1937 in Étaples in the Pas-de-Calais department and is buried in the municipal cemetery.

=== Connection to Breslau Jewish community ===
Myron Barlow's grandparents emigrated from Breslau, Germany to the United States by way of Hull, bringing Myron's father Adolph with them. Had they remained and he born in Breslau, they would have been part of the Jewish community there that numbered about 7,384 in 1849 and 20,202 in 1933. That community was devastated after 1933; its population shrank to 10,309 by 1939. Hitler's 3rd Reich shut down most places of worship and schools for Jewish people in 1939 and sent the population to concentration and extermination camps in 1941-1942, including Auschwitz, Sobibor, Riga, and Theresienstadt.

Myron died in 1937, about the time the destruction of his ancestral community was beginning; had his family been in Breslau in the four years after his death, they would have suffered the same fate as other Jewish people in their community.

== Murals in Detroit ==
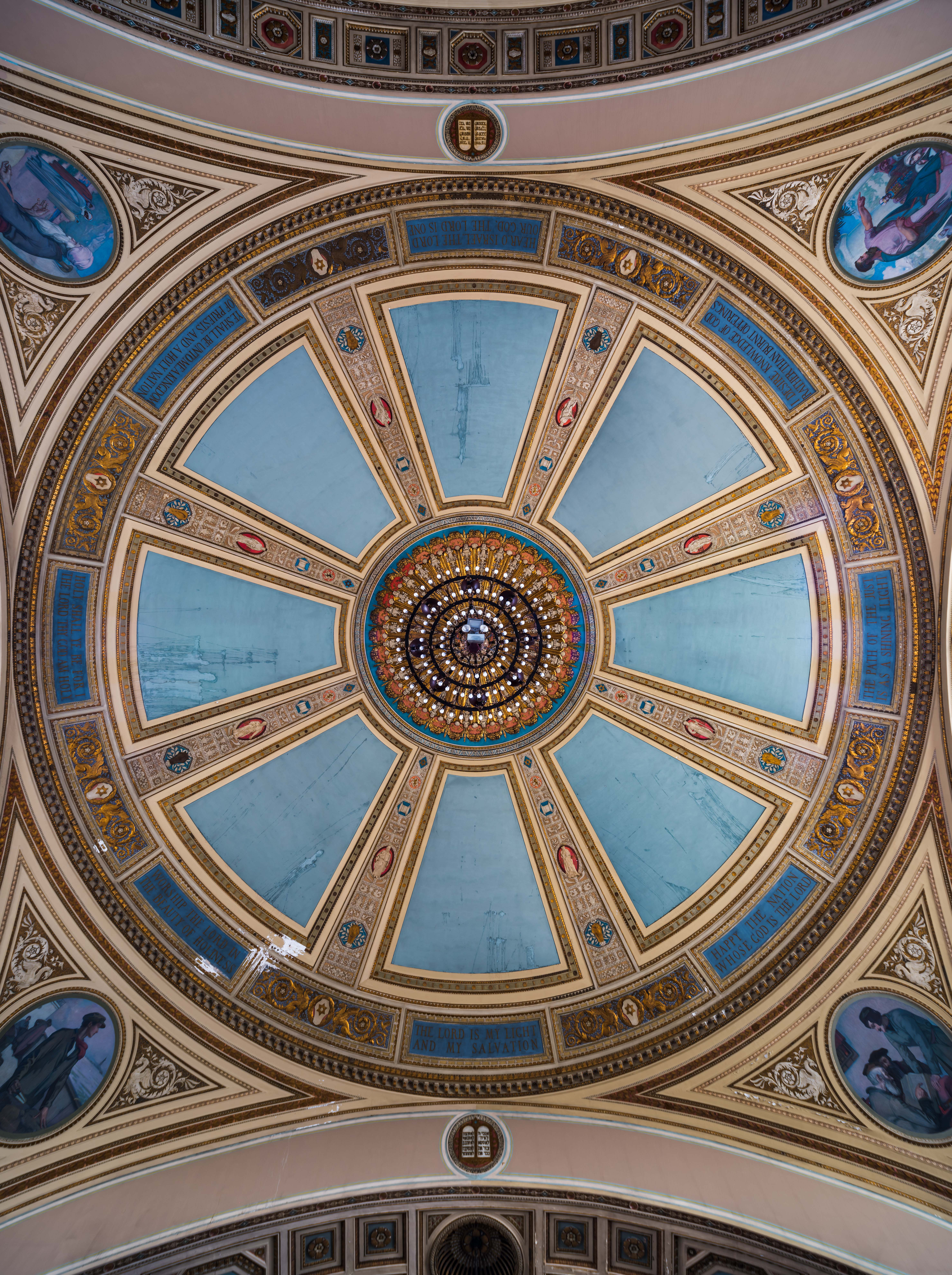

Myron Barlow created mural paintings for his parents' synagogue in Detroit, at the suggestion of Rabbi Leo M. Franklin. It was mentioned that Barlow looked at the work of Giovanni Battista Tiepolo in France, and he himself studied and possibly painted ceilings in Paris. Four murals in the Temple Beth El were dedicated in 1925 and still survive today, each measuring 8 feet 3 inches in diameter. Barlow's four paintings were painted on canvas in France and then brought to the United States by him, to be installed in the temple. The paintings were written about in March 1923, when the first to be completed, "The Prophet in Conflict With The Church" was displayed at the Institute of Arts. They were among the first paintings to be placed in a Jewish temple as decoration.

The four paintings were written about in The Advocate in 1925. The paintings include The Patriarch in which Abraham welcomes three strangers, The Prophet in which 11 figures react to the words of a prophet, a painting of older European Jews from the middle ages teaching the young, and The Immigrant depicting an immigrant with prayer book passing the Statue of Liberty.

He had a family connection to the temple. In his mother's obituary, the temple was listed as the one she attended. His father's funeral services took place at the temple. His sister Rose was also active at the temple.

In a separate event, when the older Beth El Temple was converted into the Bonstelle Theatre, Barlow directed the interior decoration in "Italian style."

=== Murals in the Bethel Community Transformation Center in Detroit, painted by Myron Barlow ===
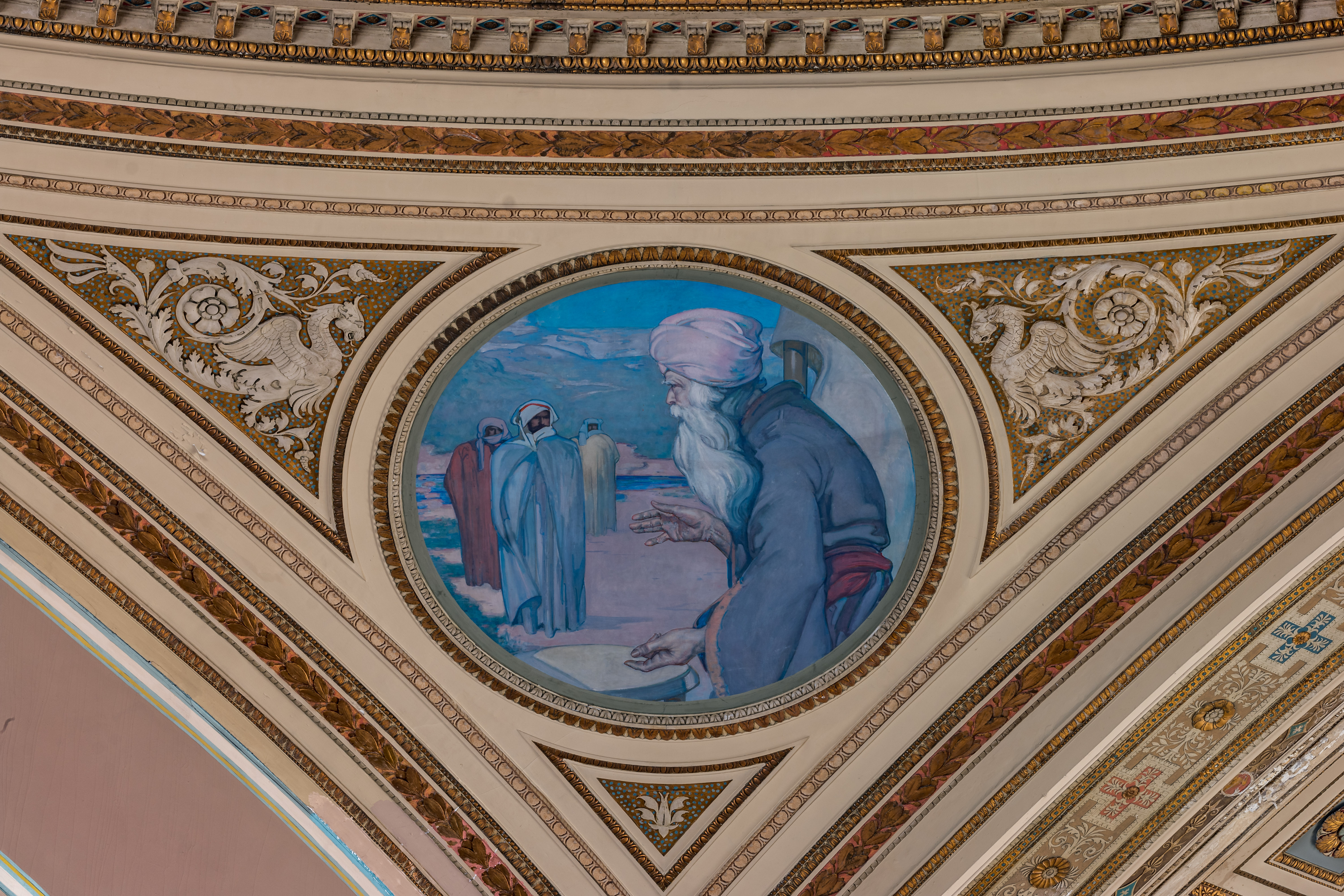
The Patriarch, or Abraham, the Messenger of the Lord

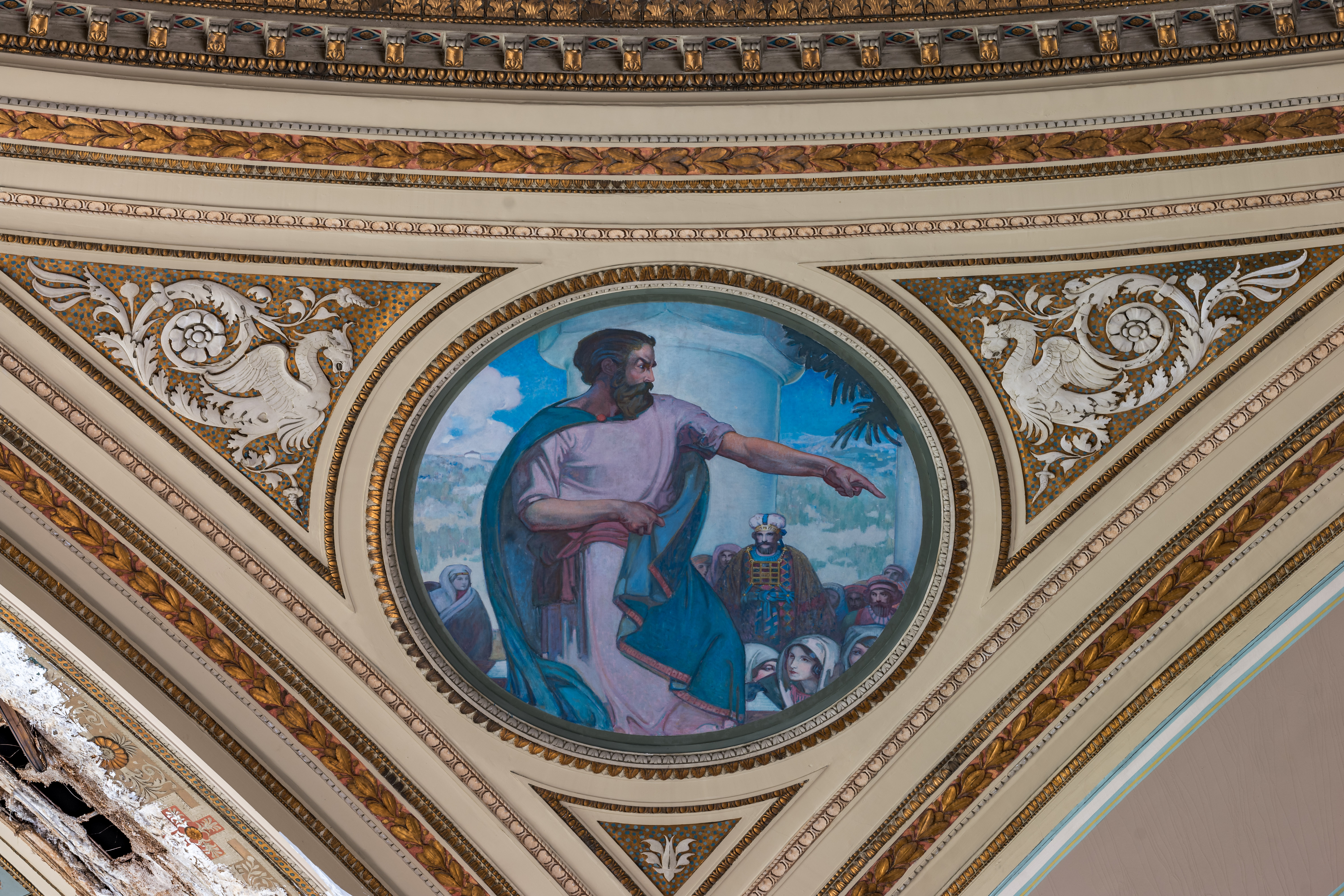
The Prophet, The Prophet in Conflict With the Church

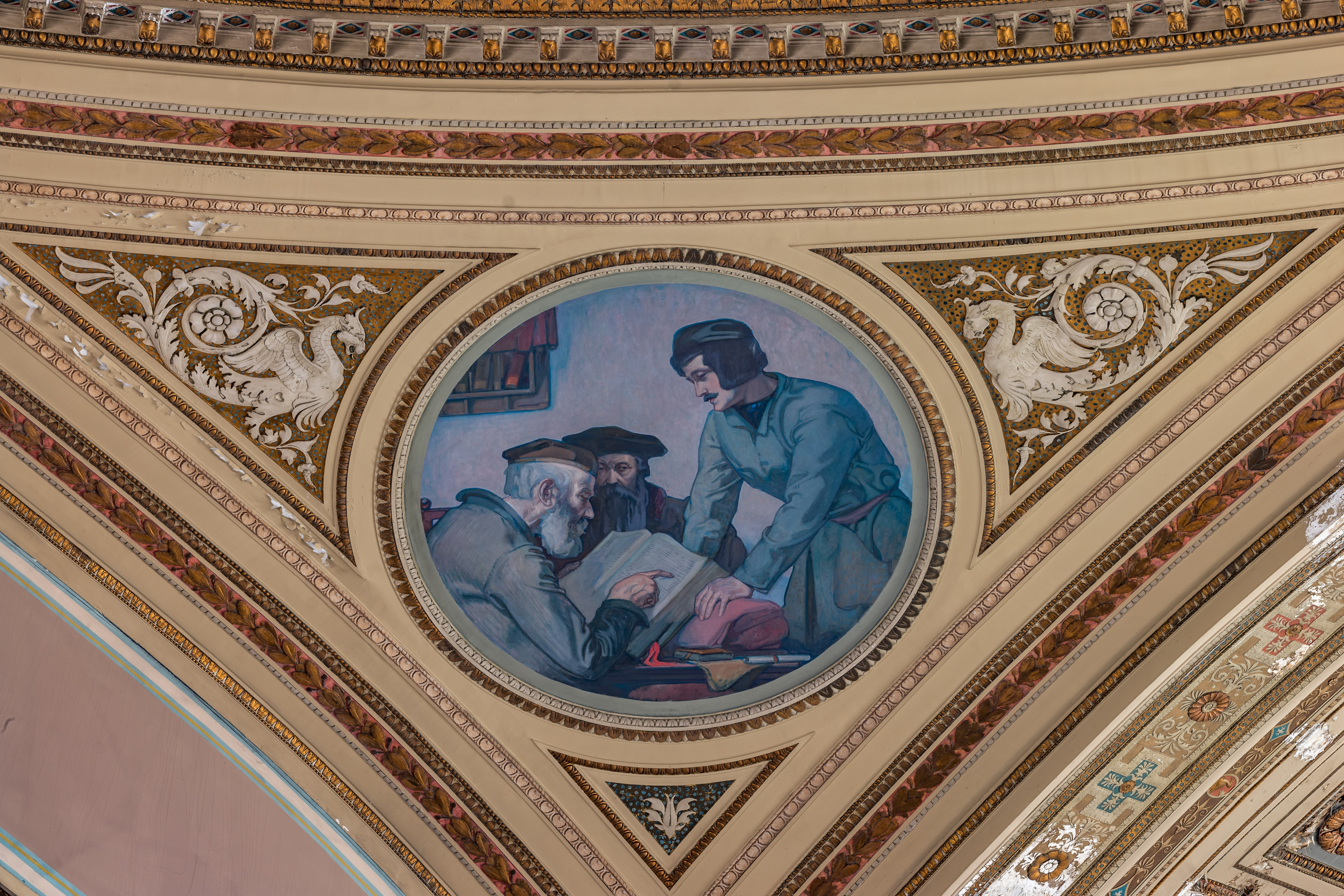
The Student in the Time of the Middle Ages

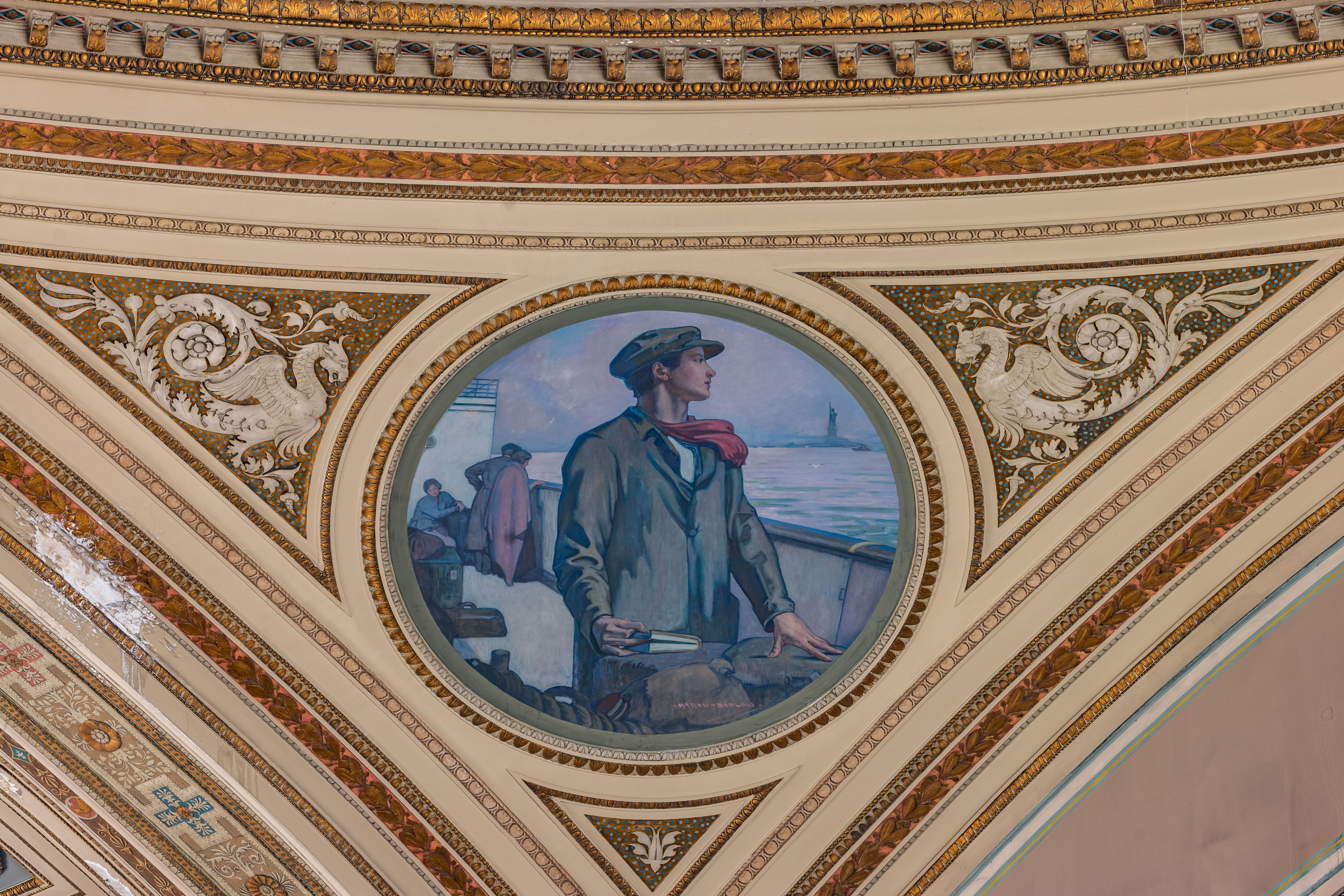
The Immigrant, or The Hope of the Future

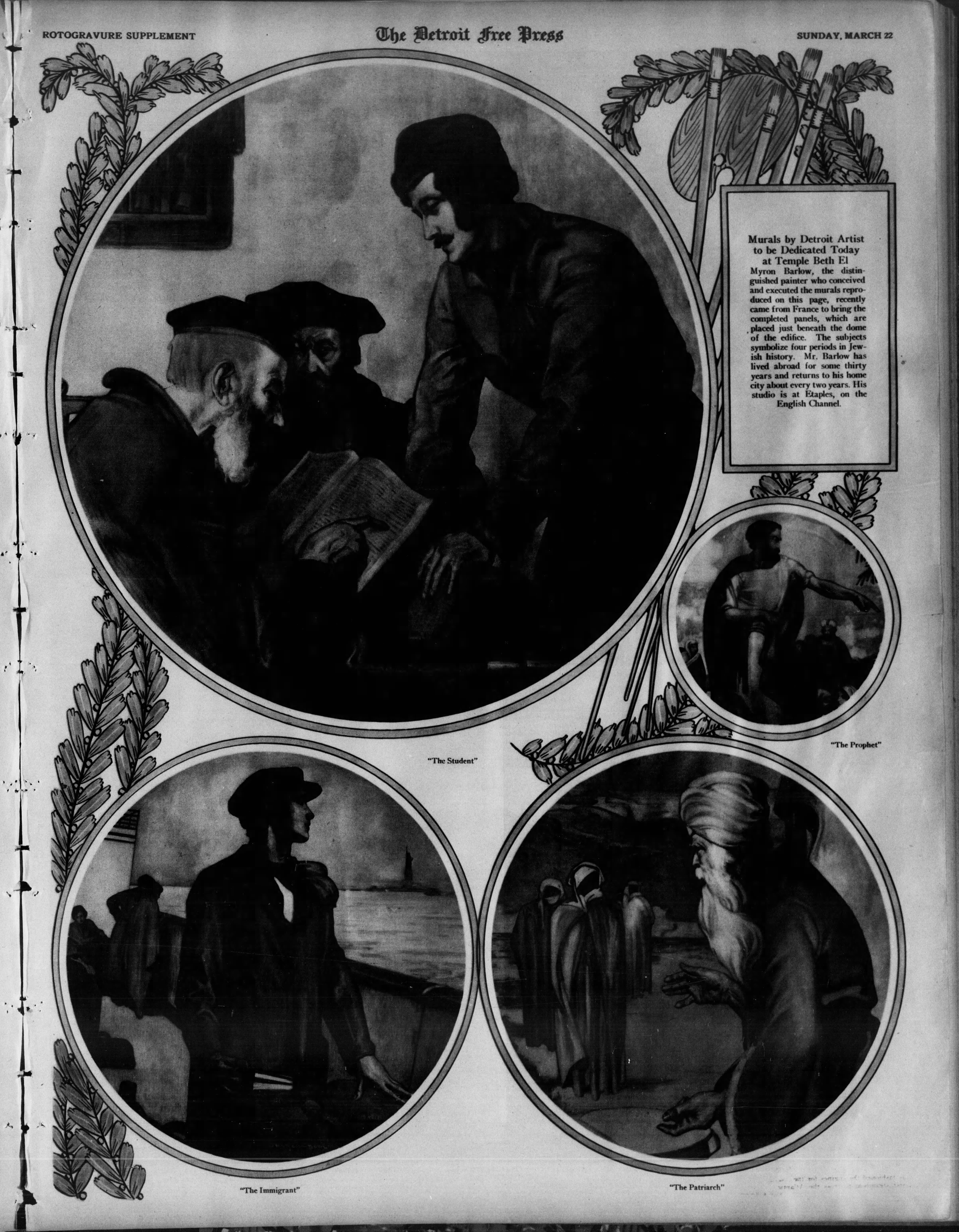
Myron Barlow paintings, Beth El Temple, Detroit Free Press, March 22, 1925

== Tonality ==
Two color styles

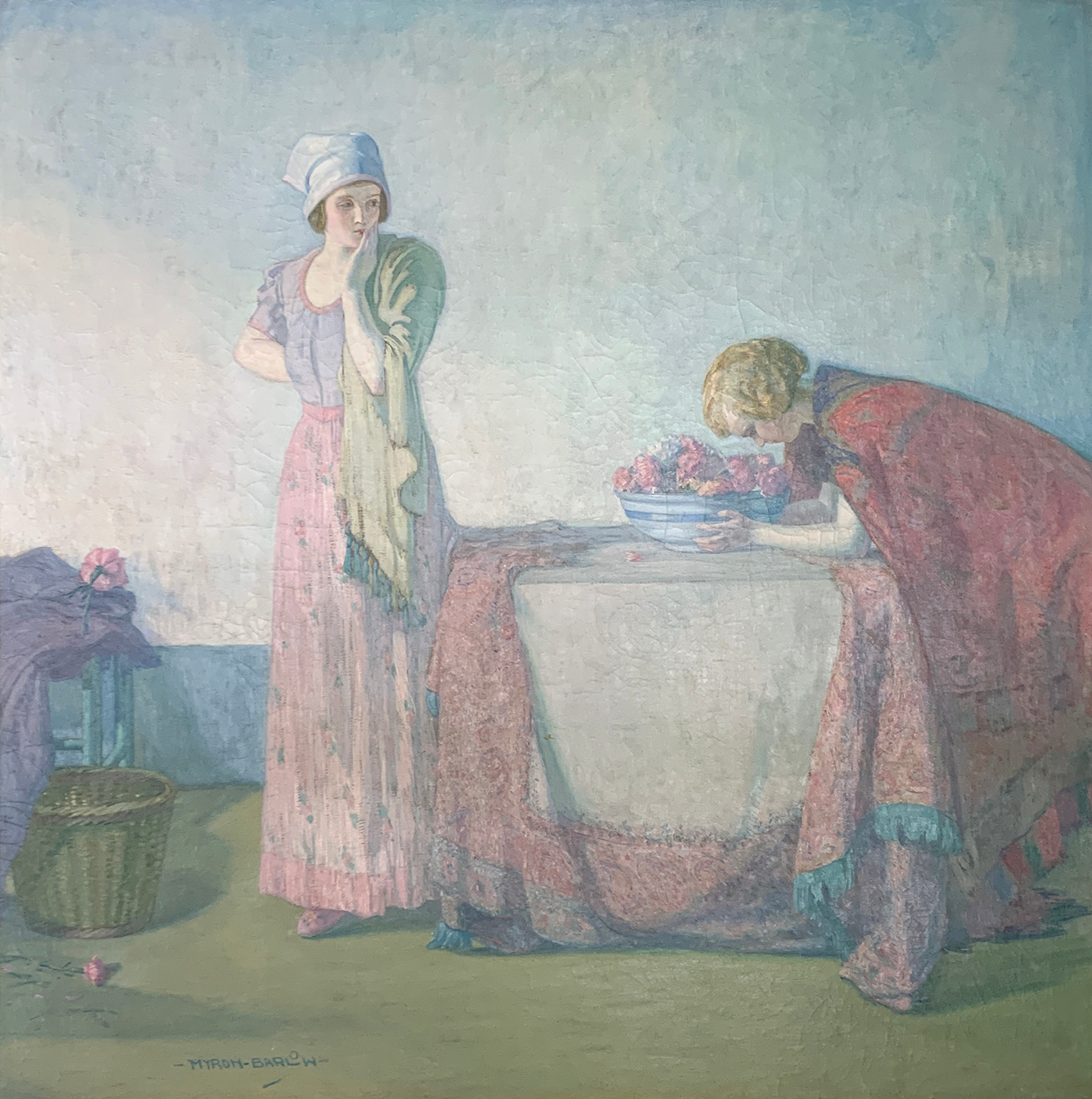
Two Women with a bowl of flowers on a table. Example of Barlow's use of delicate blues, greys and mauves. c. 1912

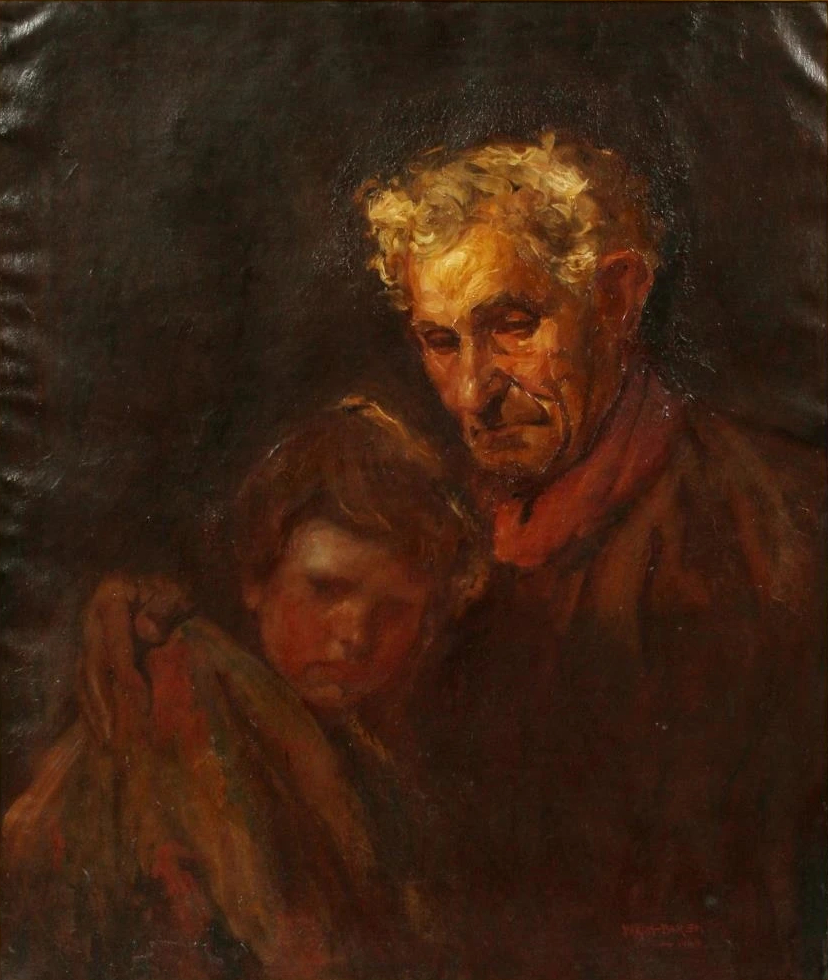
Grandfather, 1903. Possibly Barlow's 1904 Paris Salon painting. This color scheme was described as "Rembrandt shades".

About 1909, Barlow made a shift in the way he was using colors. His hometown newspaper, the Detroit Free Press, commented on his shift, saying, "The low, dark tones in which Mr. Barlow painted at the time of his last exhibition [1907] have given place to harmonious gray and blue tints." Another said, "dreamy studies...in greys, blues and mauves."

His color was further characterized in 1914, as being of "light, reserved tones...delicate shades...."

In 1916, the work was defined as "blue pictures," "high key" with "figures placed against a very light or white background." He claimed to have pioneered pictures in an overall blue cast; another to use this blue cast was his friend Henry Ossawa Tanner.

== Gallery ==
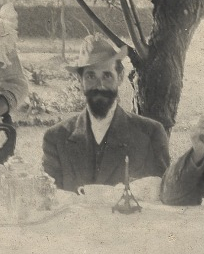
Myron G. Barlow, circa 1907–1908

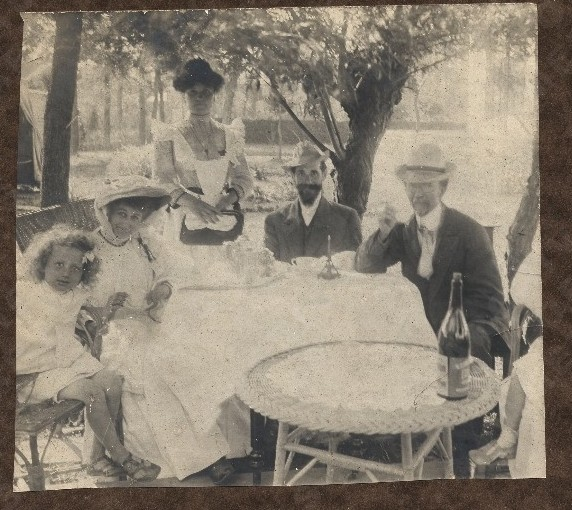
Myron Barlow (second from right) with Henry Ossawa Tanner and Tanner's wife Jessie and son Jessie seated around him.

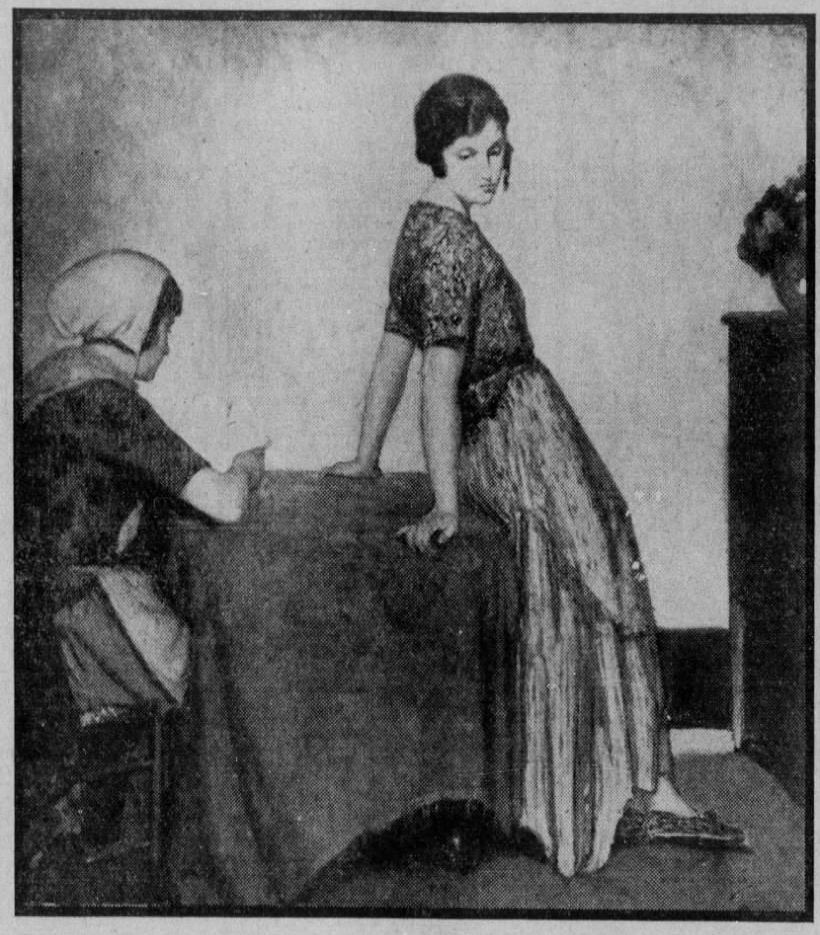
Reading, from Detroit Free Press, Apr 5, 1936

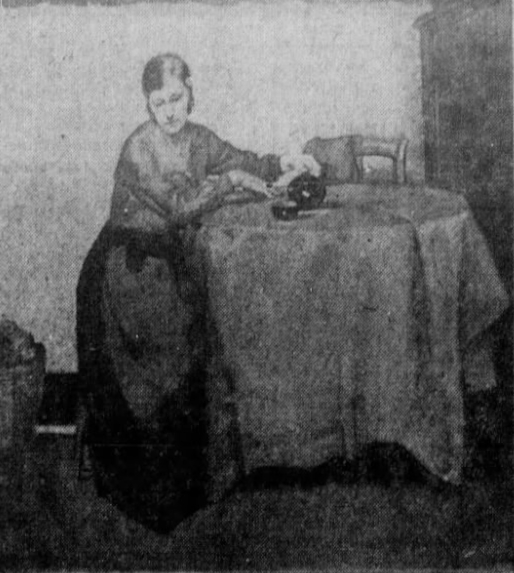
Woman at table, by Myon G. Barlow

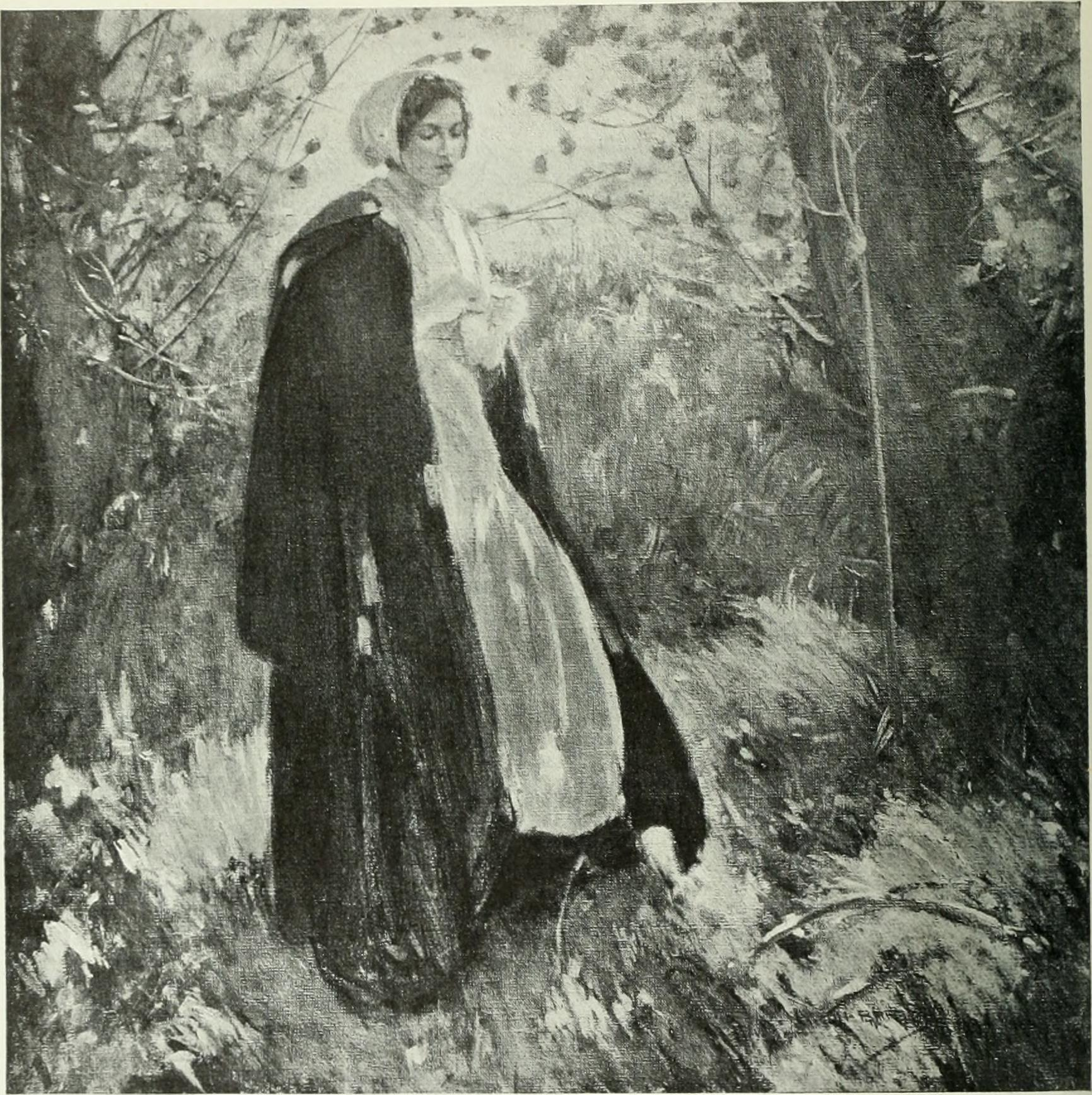
Shepherdess, from page 284 of "Studio international" (June 1912)" 24th Annual Exhibition, Chicago Art Institute.

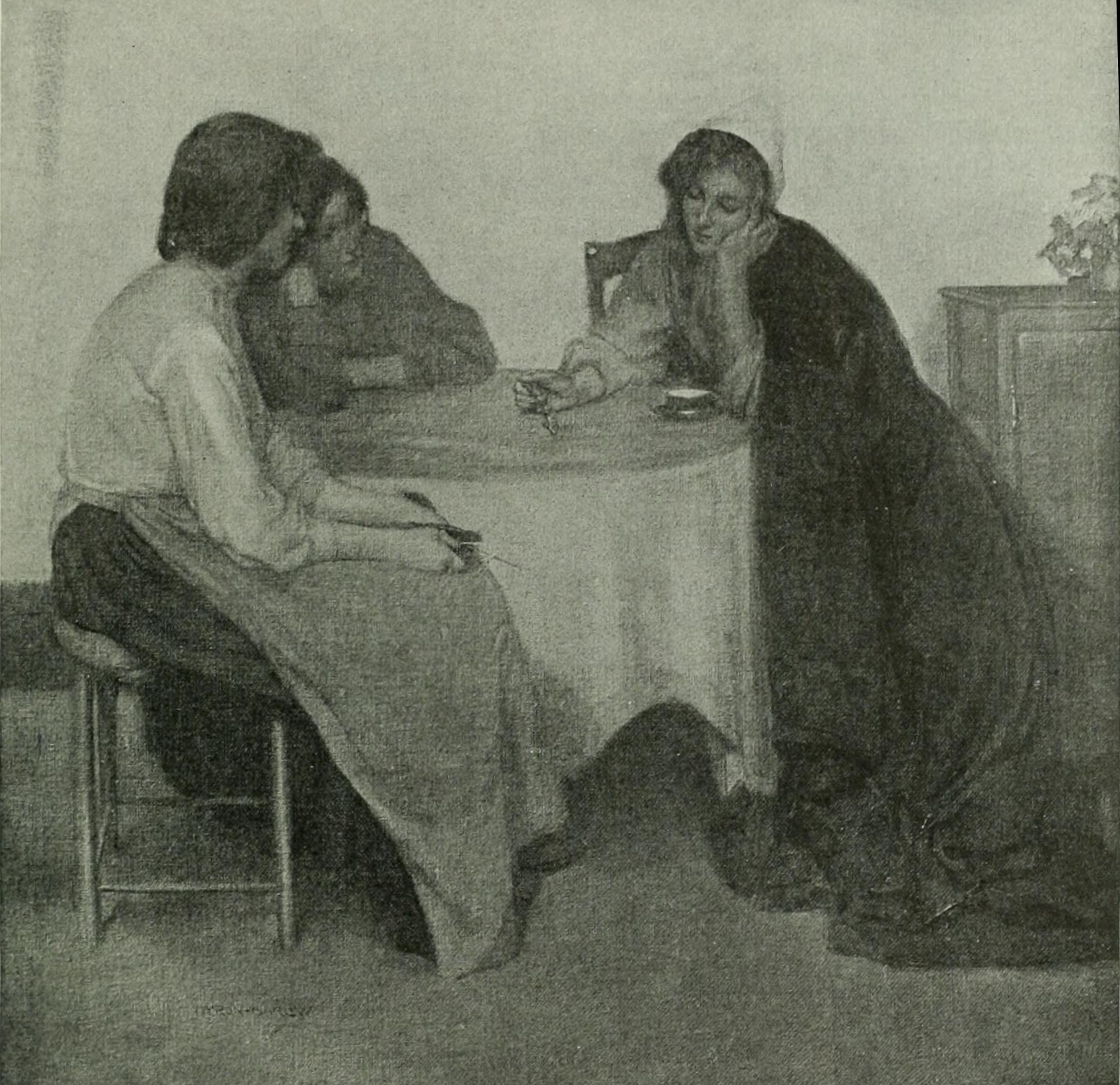
The Question, from page 285 of "International studio" (June 1912) Also, The Embarrassing Question. Entry for Paris Salon (Beaux Arts), 1910. 23rd Exhibition, Chicago Art Institute.

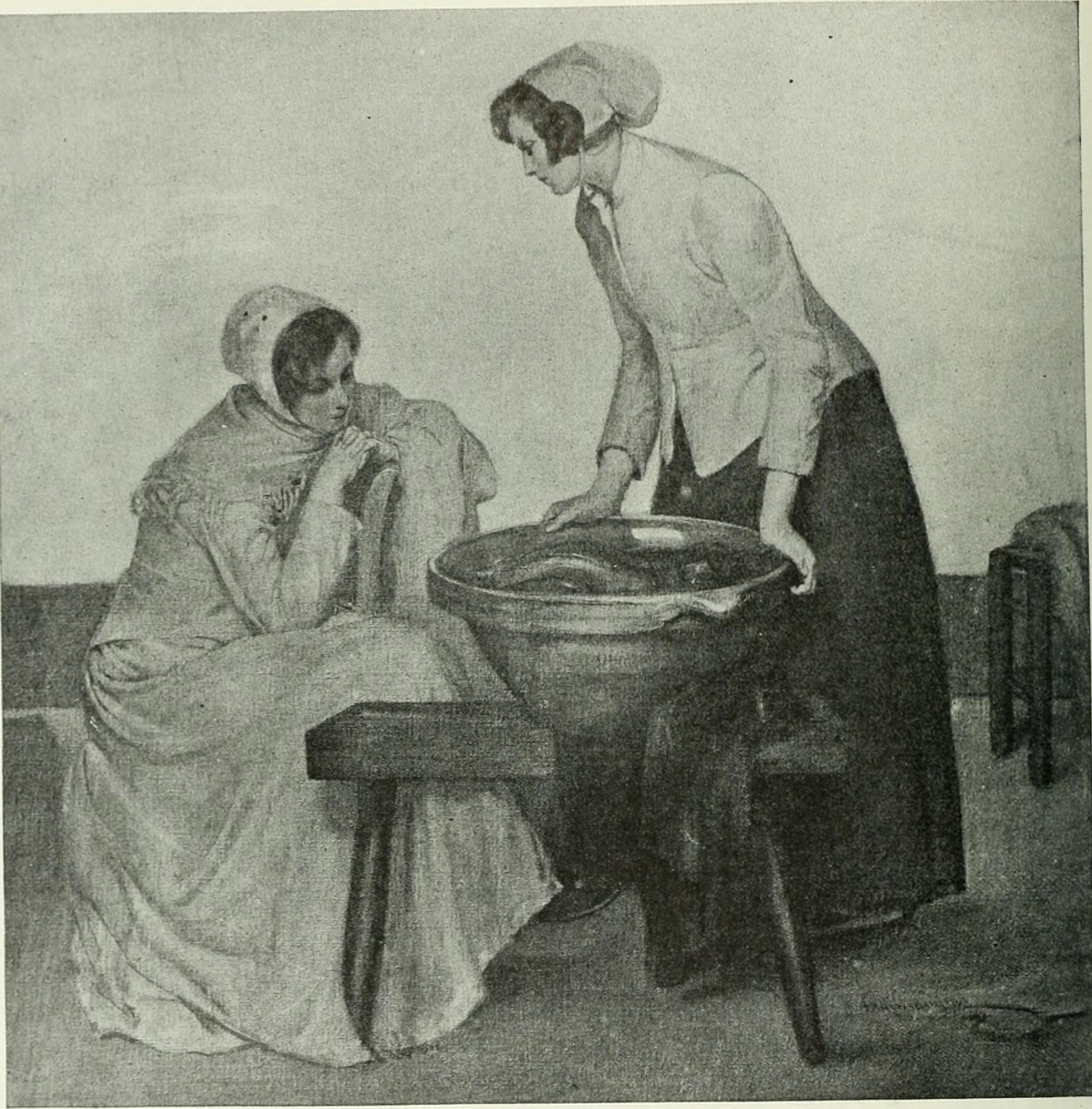
Causerie, from page 286 of "Studio international" (June 1912) 23rd Annual Exhibition, Chicago Art Institute, 1910.

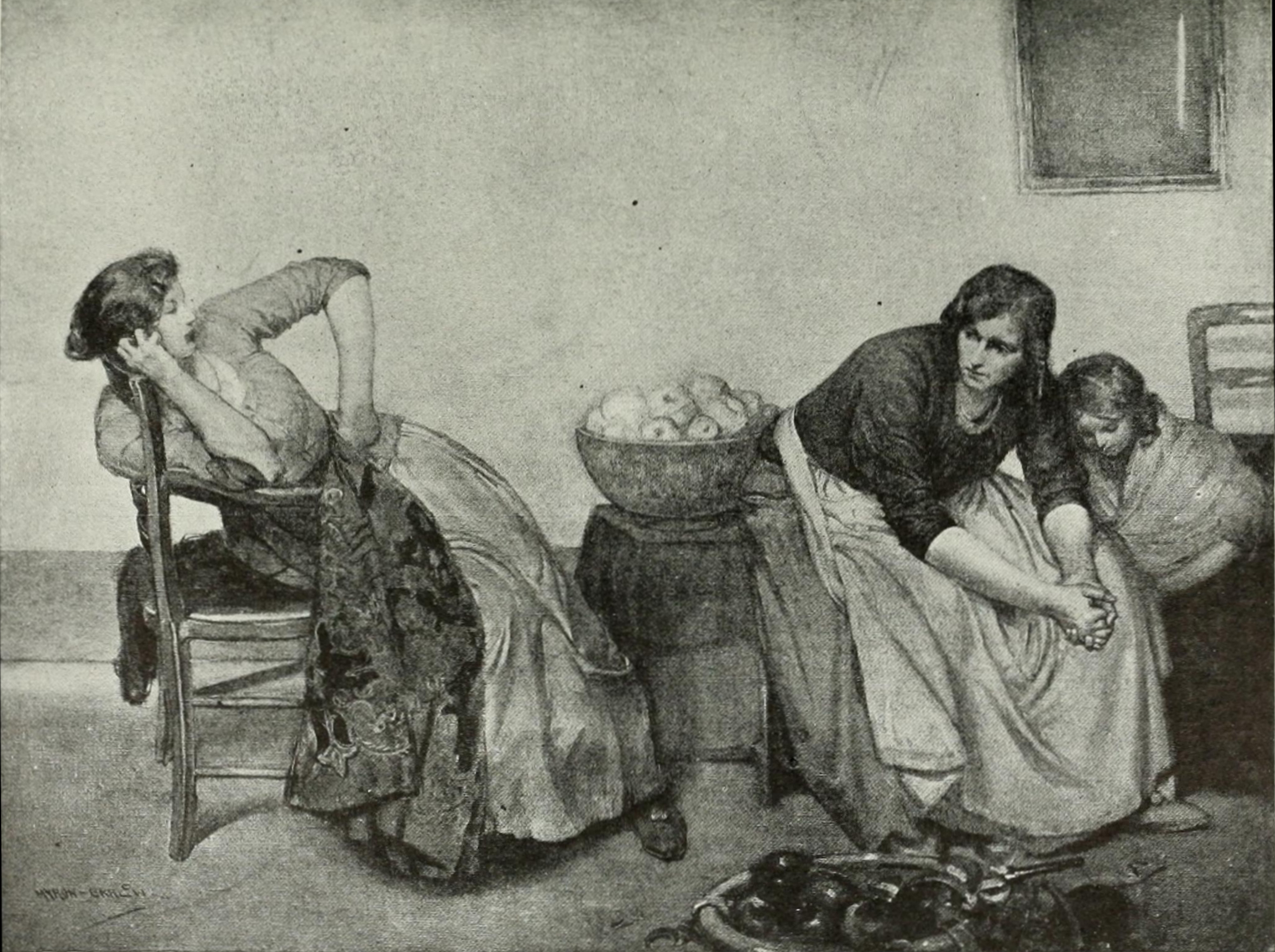
Disdain, from page 287 of "Studio international" (June 1912) 24th Annual Exhibition, Chicago Art Institute, 1911.

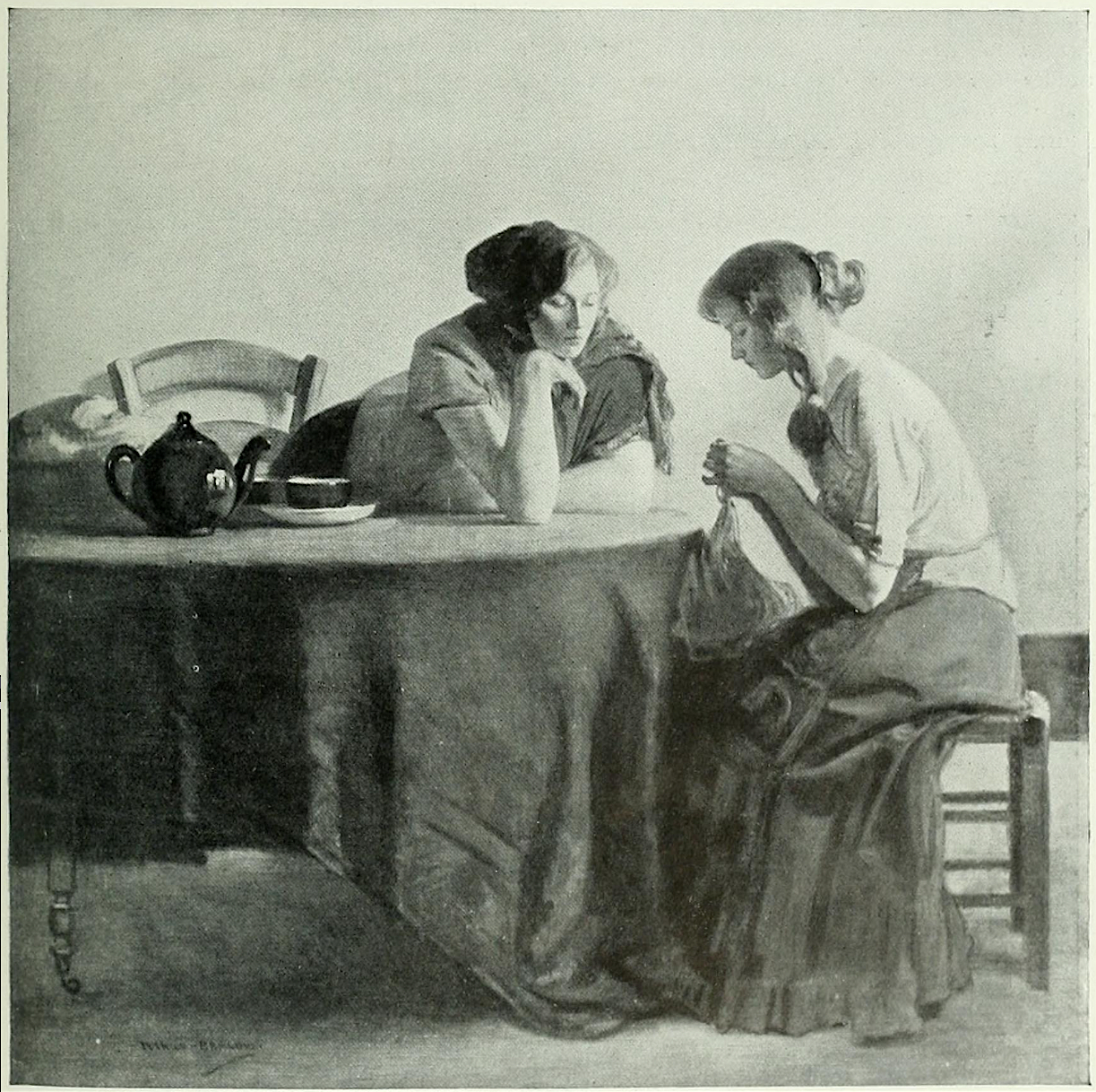
Le Crochet. Entry for Paris Salon (Beaux Arts), 1913. Paris Salon des Beaux Arts, 1913, entry 63.

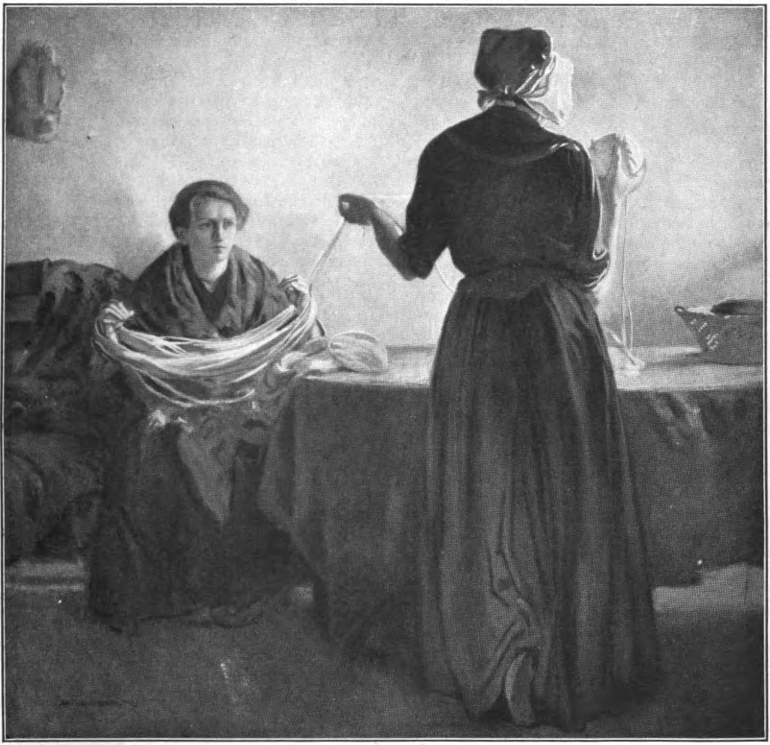
The Wool Winders in Hearst's Magazine, Volume 24, page 947. (December 1913). Or Winders, Paris Salon des Beaux Arts, 1913, entry 66.

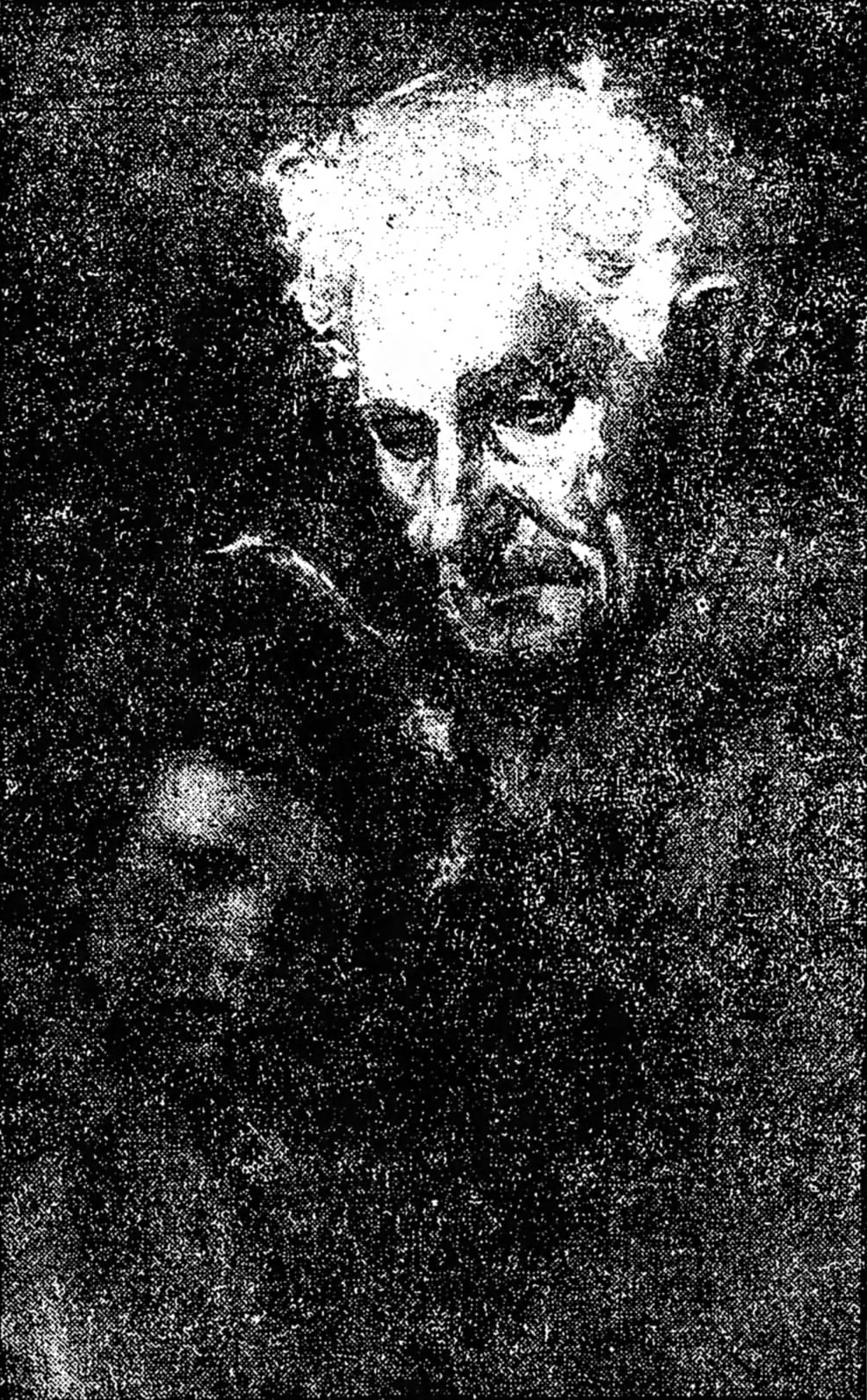
Grandfather, from newspaper, Detroit Free Press, announced May 26, 1910, as selling in a charity auction Original painting from 1903.

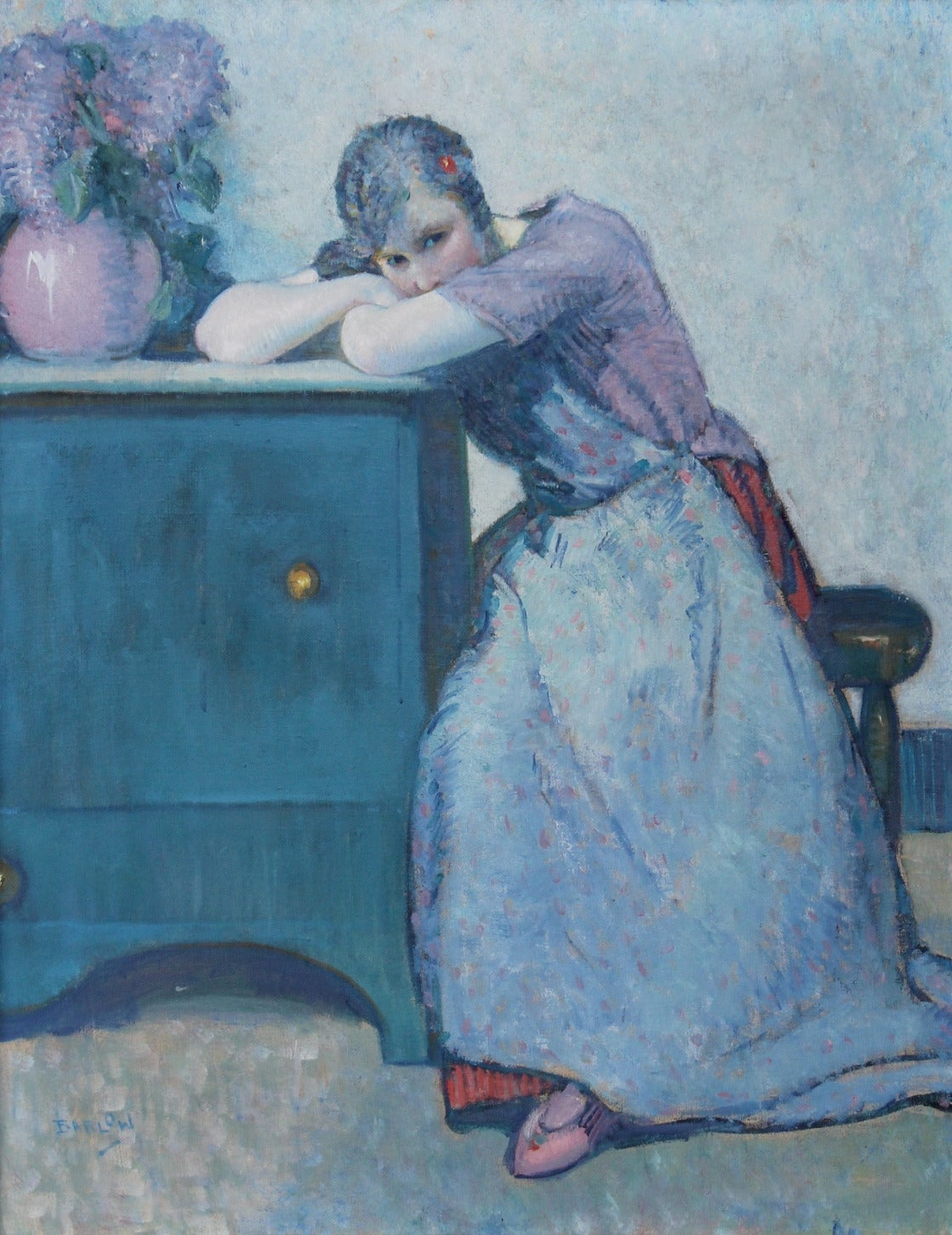
Reflection

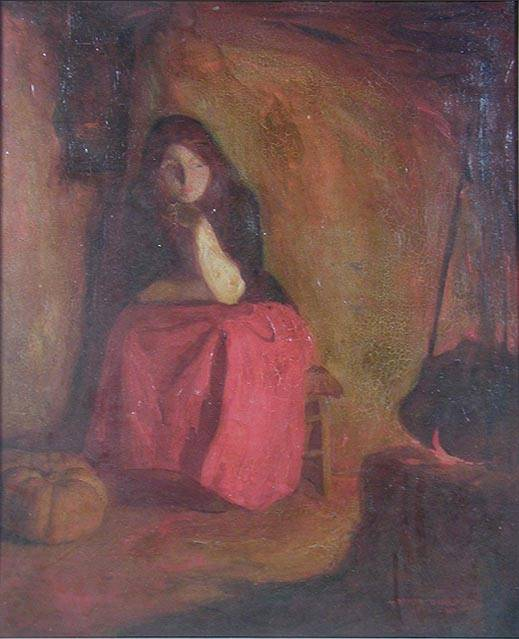
The Kettle Watch, 1904. Private collection. Also called Cinderella Entry to Beaux Arts Salon in 1905.

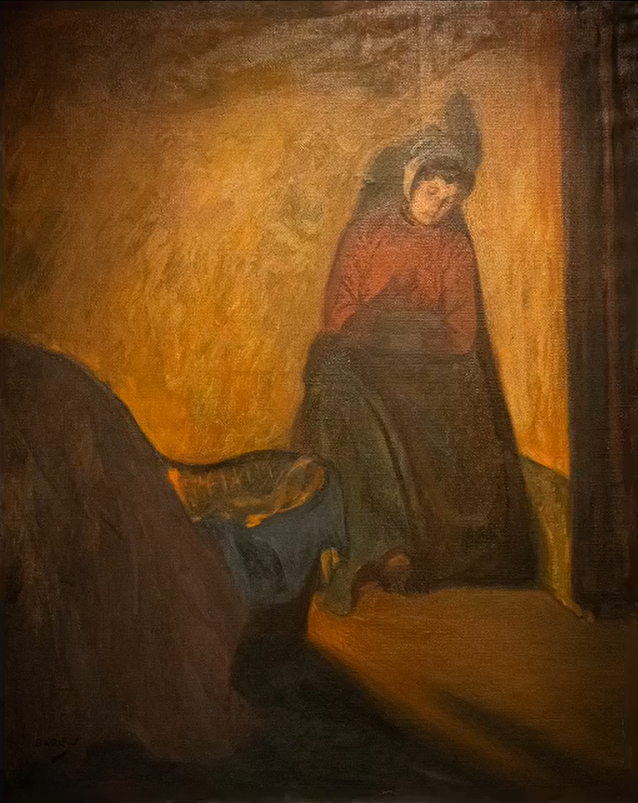
unititled, woman resting in firelit room. c. 1900-1909. Saginaw Art Museum

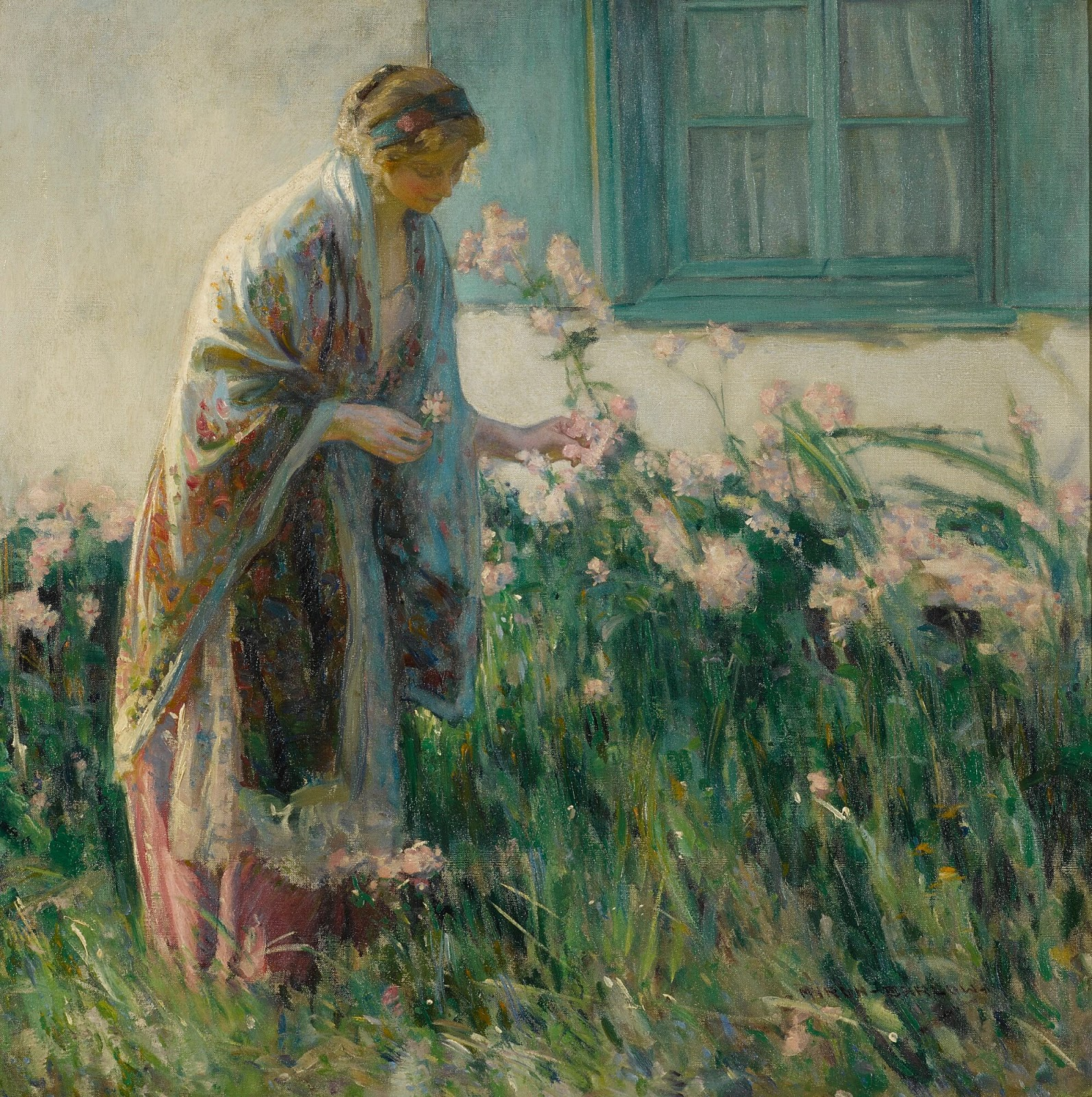
In the Garden. Appears to be Fleurs Roses (Pink Flowers), owned by M. Rothschild and exhibited at the Beaux Arts Salon.

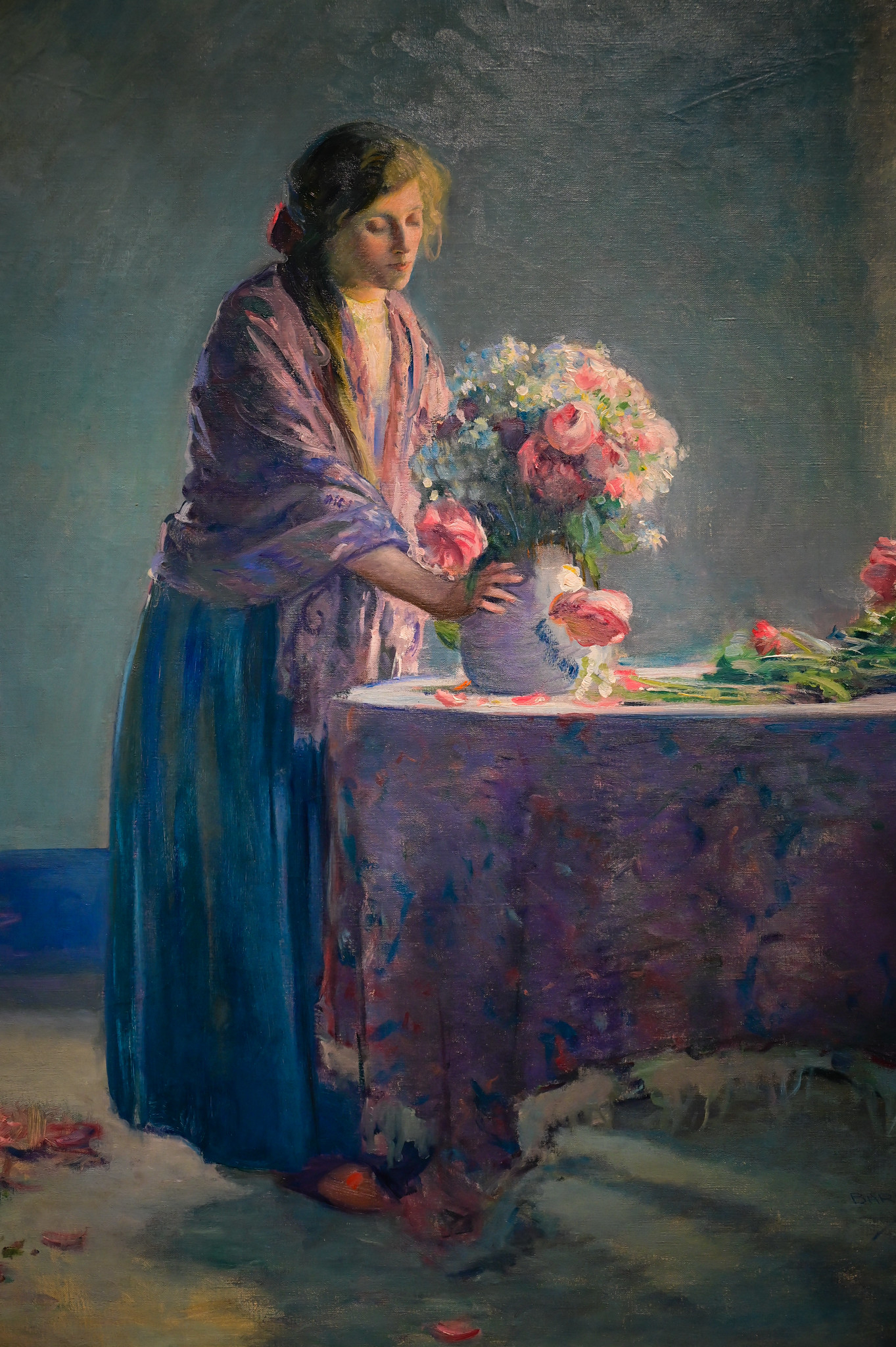
Woman arranging flowers, c. 1915. Asheville Art Museum

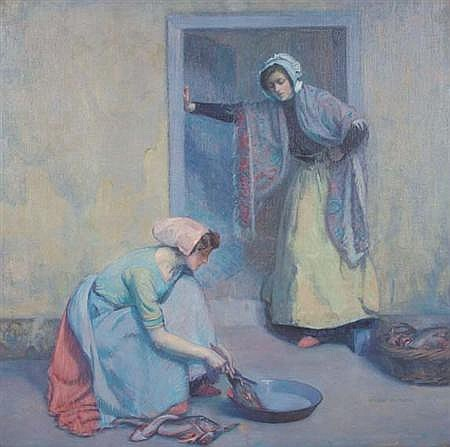
Scaling fish

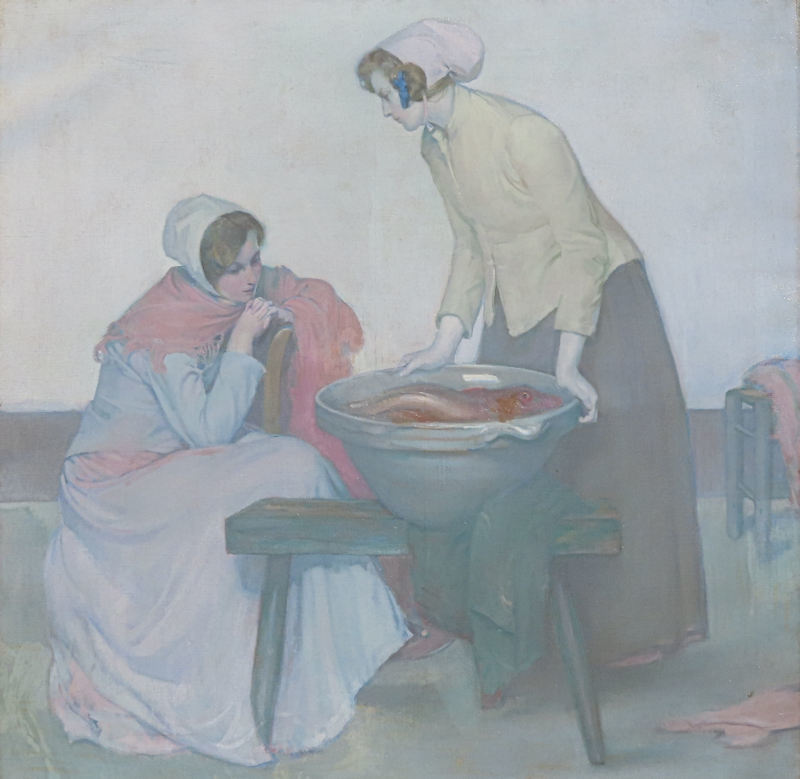
A Chat or Causerie. Exhibited at the International Exhibition of Art (1911). Also exhibited 23rd annual exhibition, Chicago Art Institute, 1910.

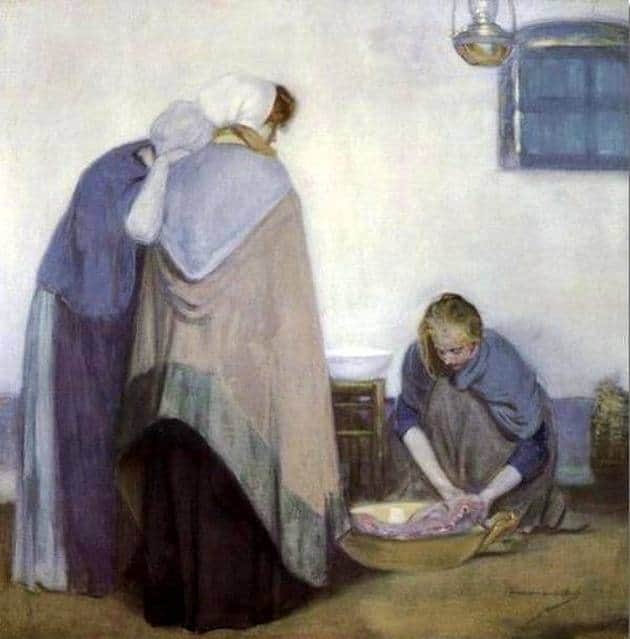
Poisson rose (Pink fish). 105th Annual Exhibition, Pennsylvania Academy of Fine Arts, 1910.

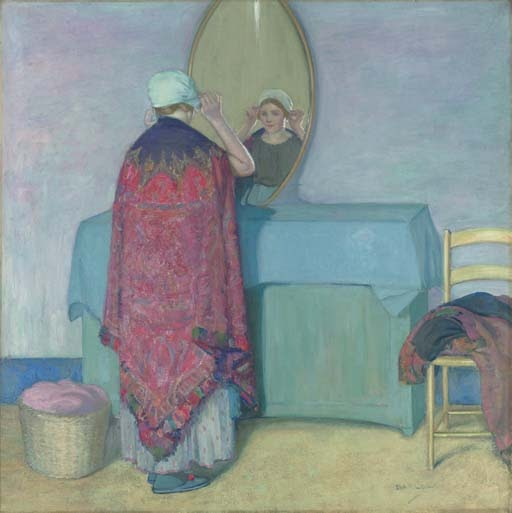
Adjusting the Hat

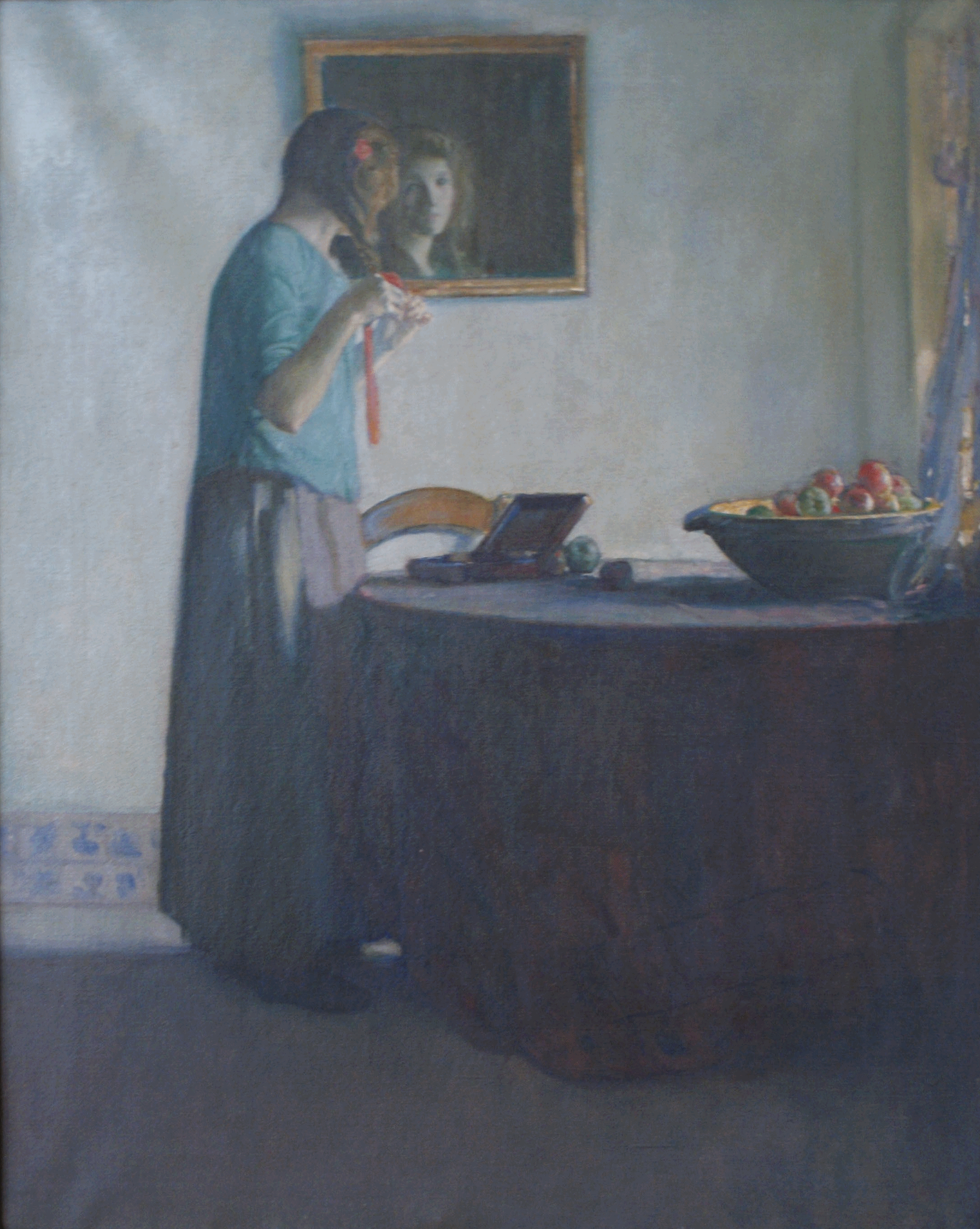
Young Girl Braiding Her Hair. c. 1912. Bought by James S. Booth, who studied under Tanner about 1911, after attending the Ecole des Beaux-Arts in Paris. Collection of Cranbrook Educational Community, in Thornlea house.

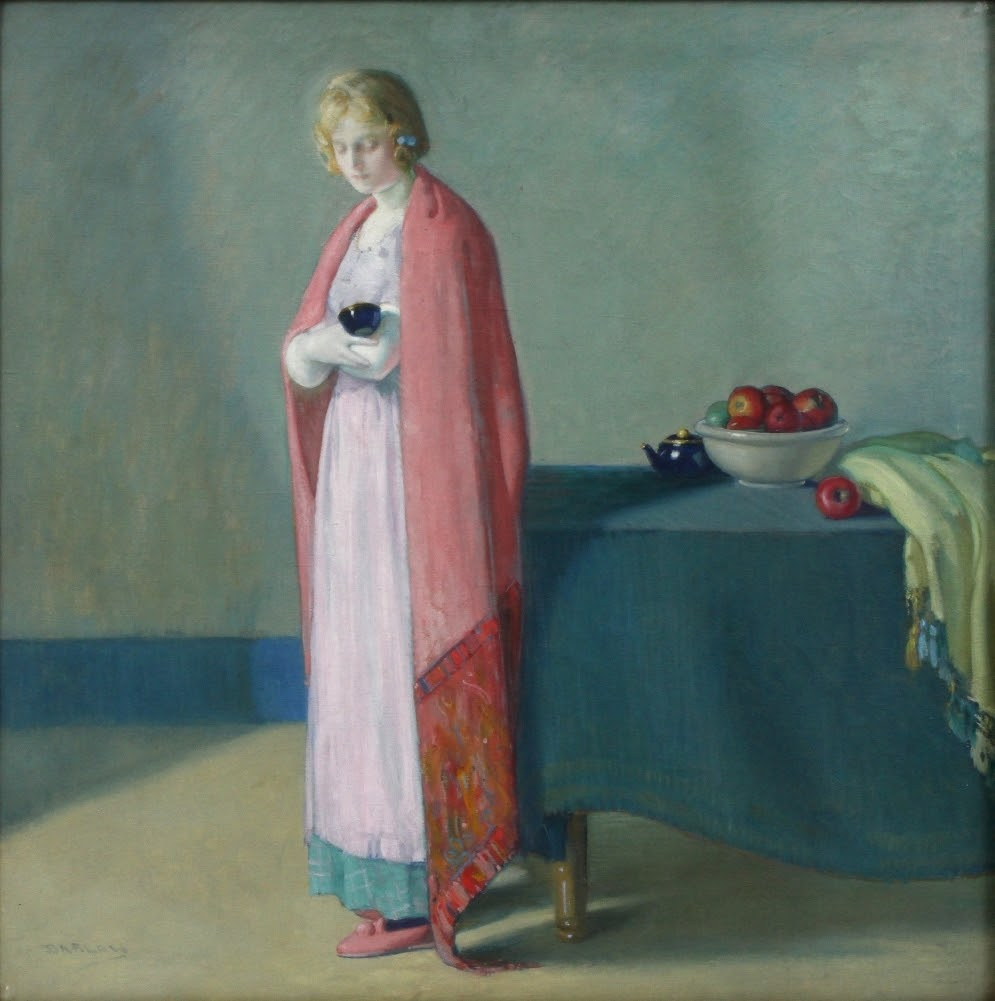
Portrait of a woman with a bowl of apples

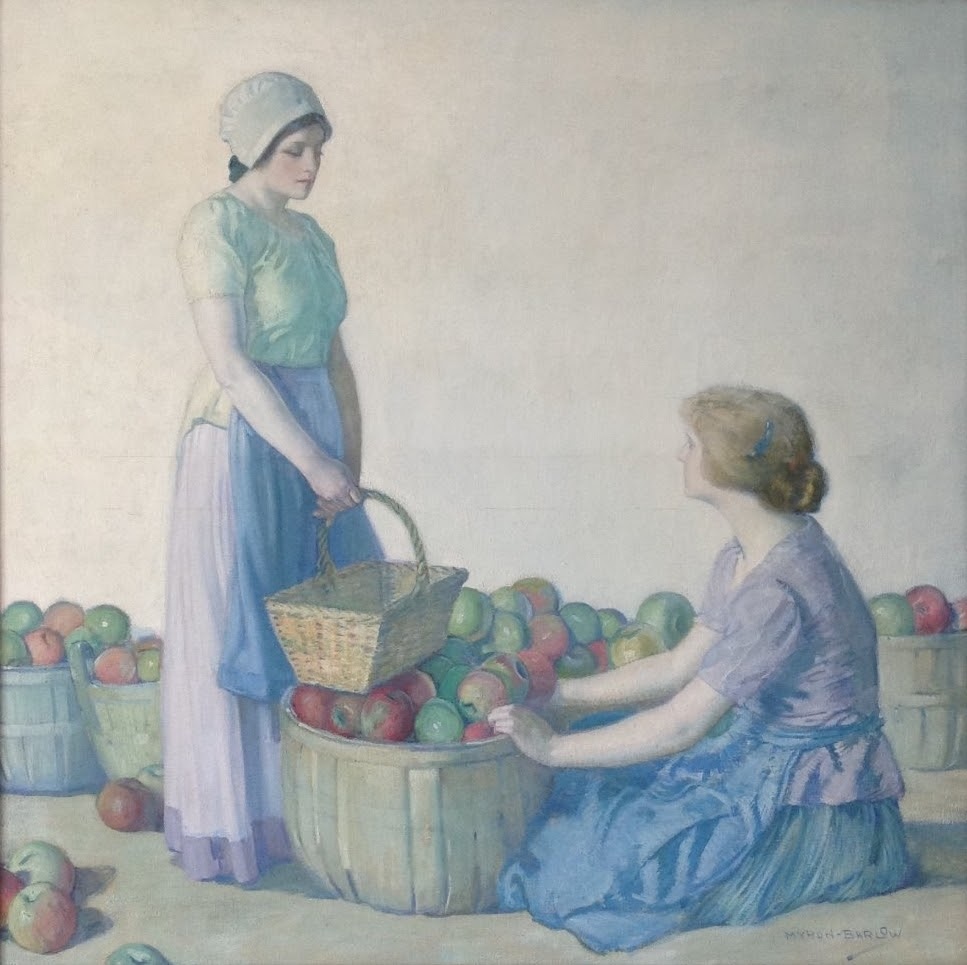
Gathering apples

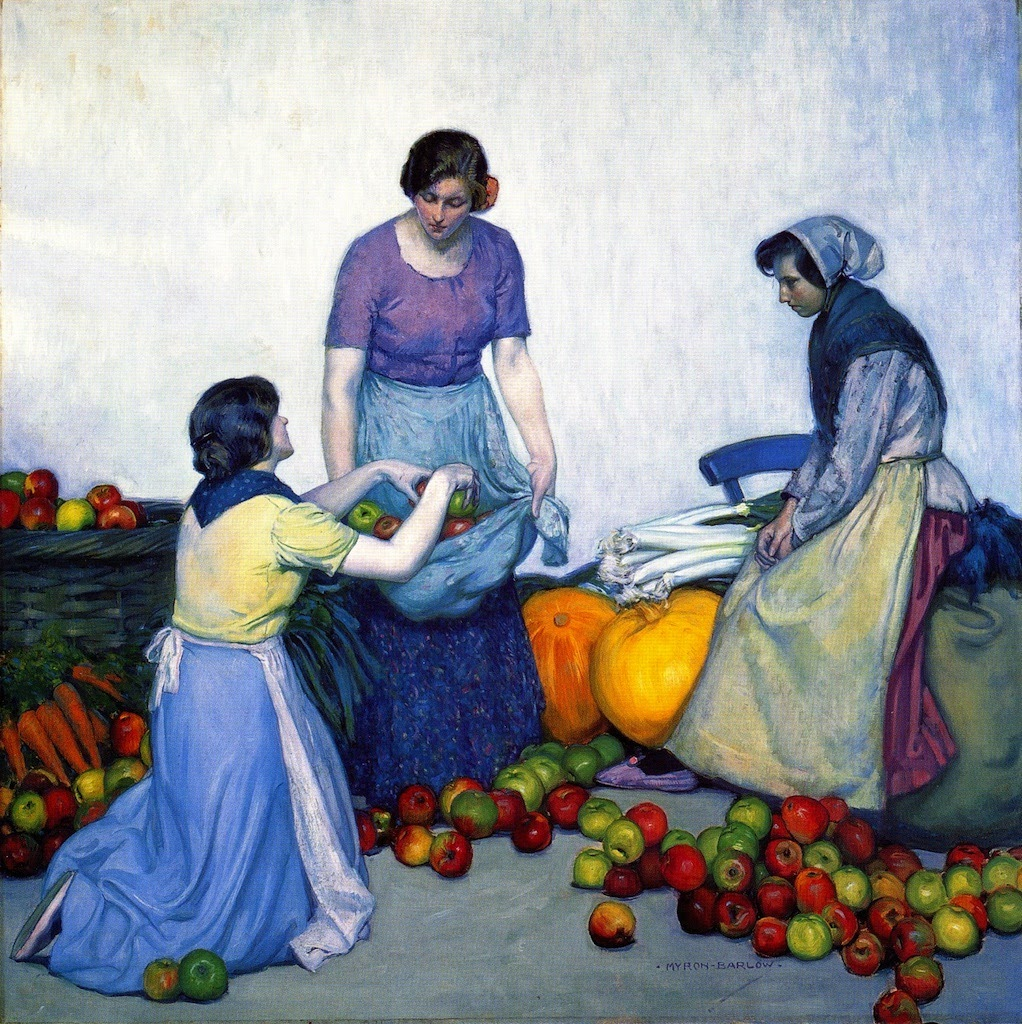
Les Pommes or Apples, 1914. Detroit Institute of Arts, oil on canvas, 59 3/8 × 59 1/4 inches. Award winning painting from the Panama-Pacific Exposition.

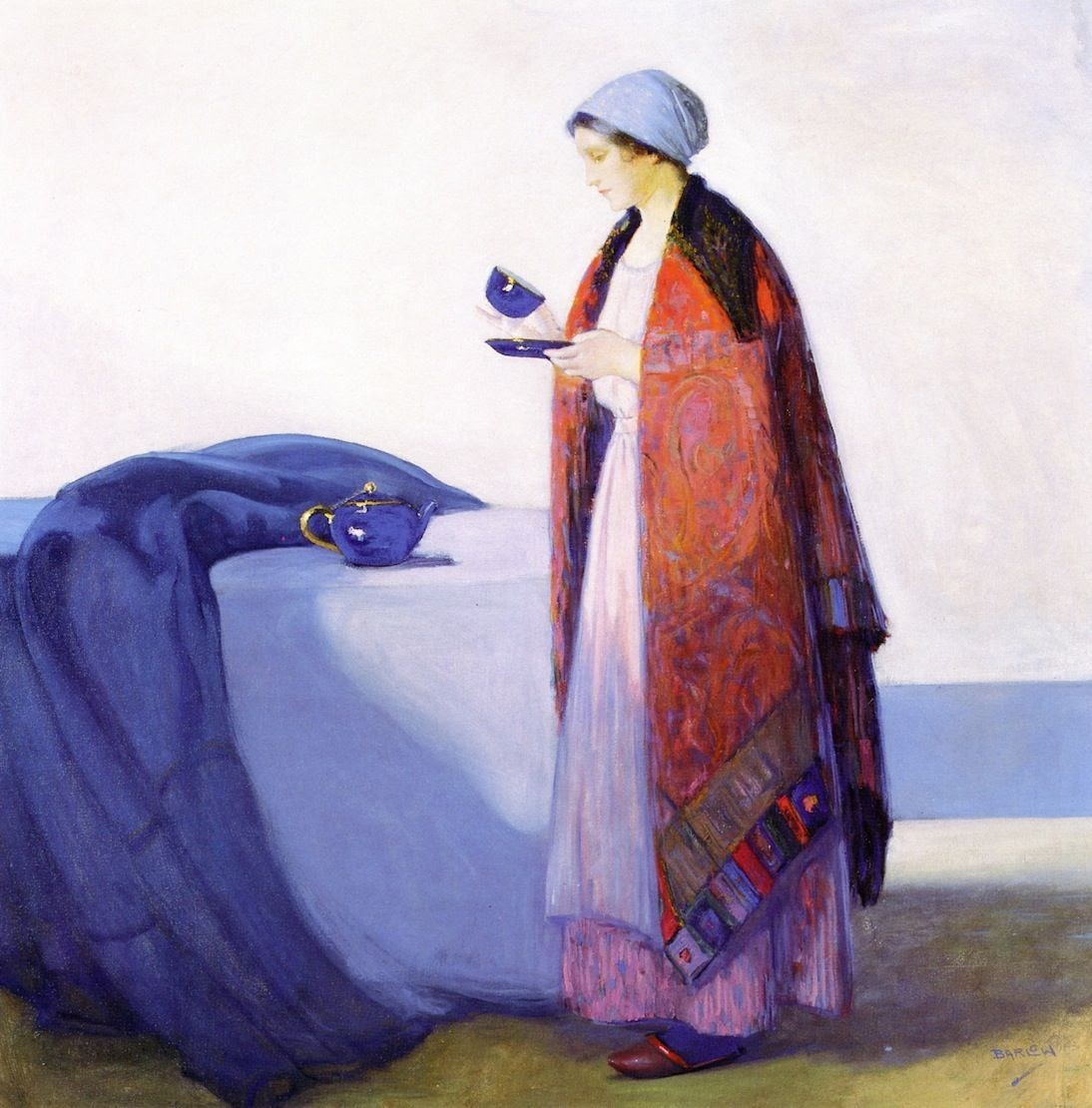
A Cup of Tea, late 1890s. Detroit Institute of Arts, oil on canvas, 30 1/2 x 39 3/4 inches. Formerly in Detroit Museum of Art.

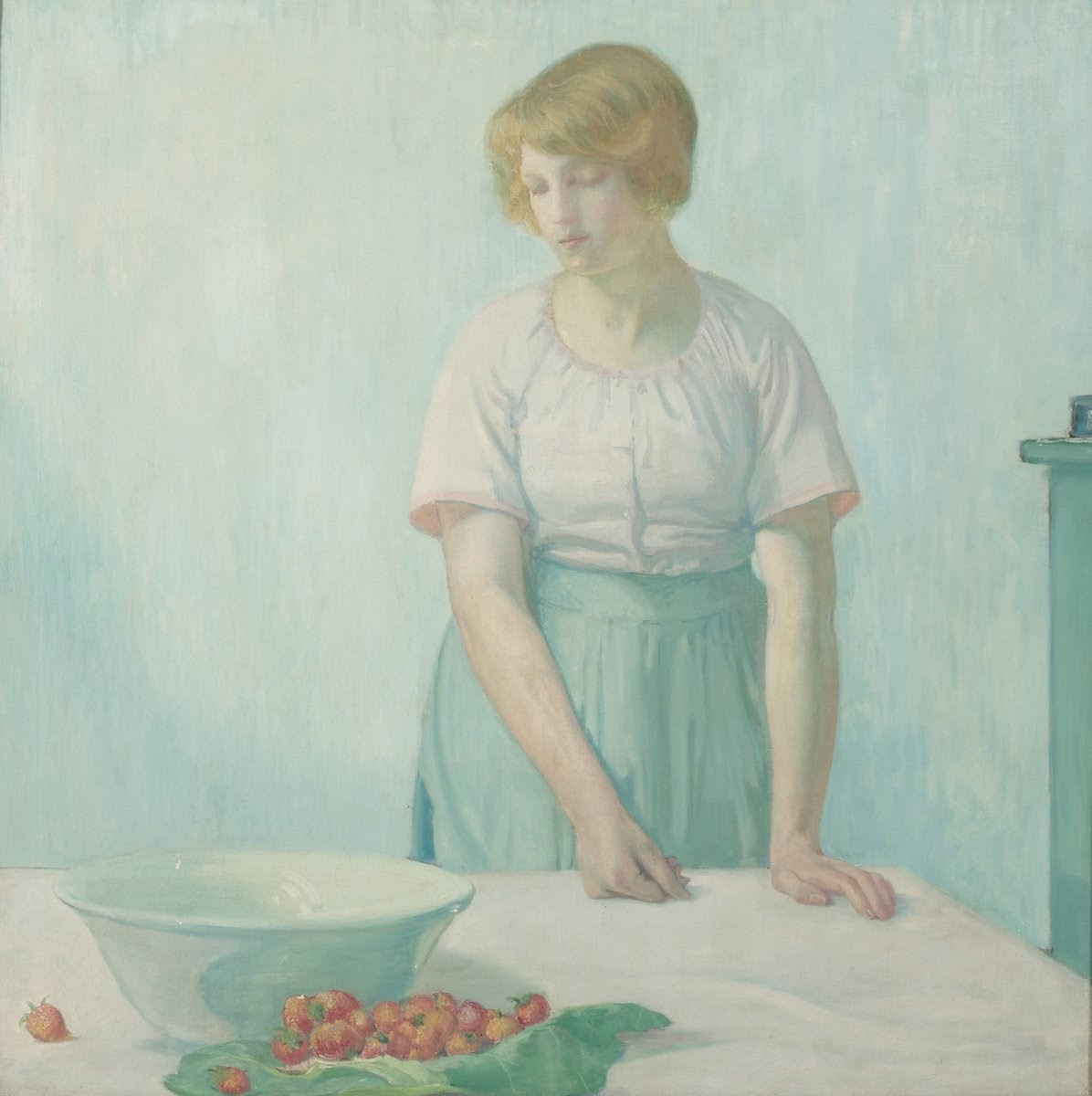
Woman with strawberries

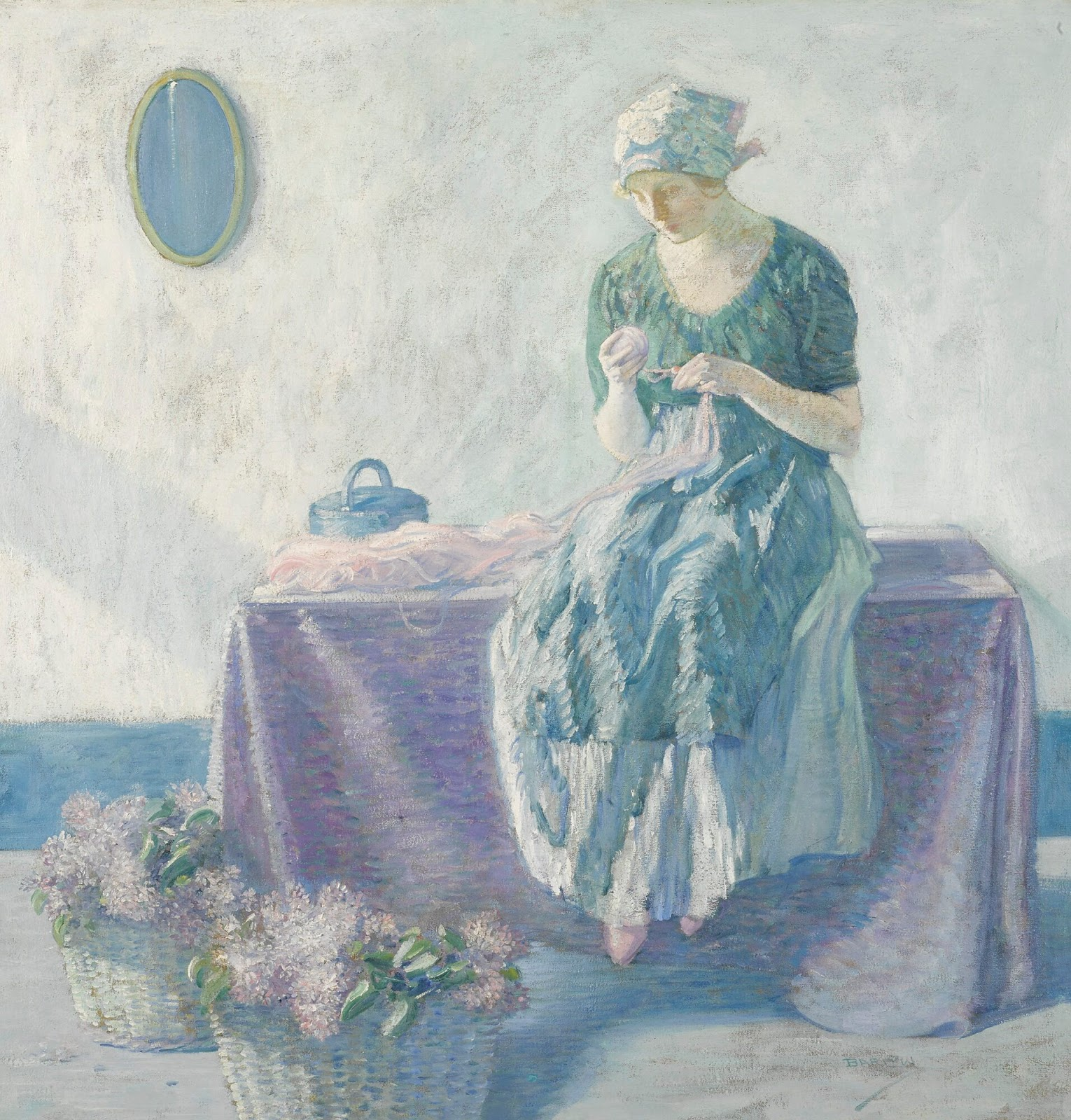
Peasant Sewing

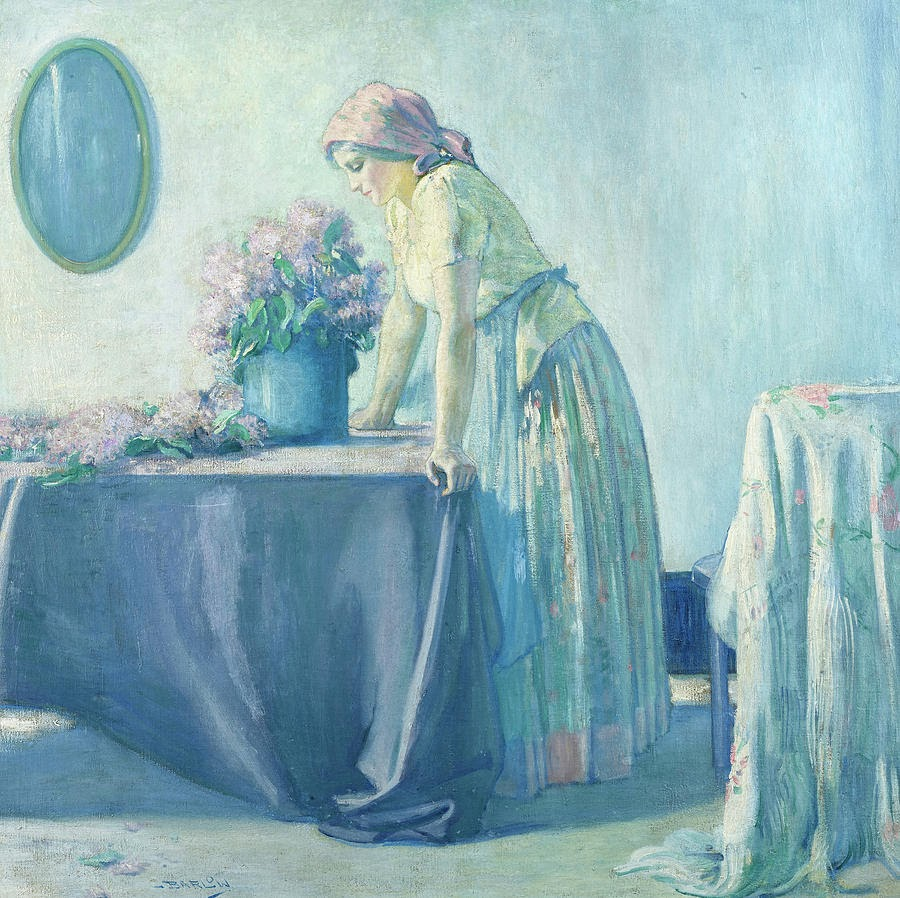
A Woman in an Interior

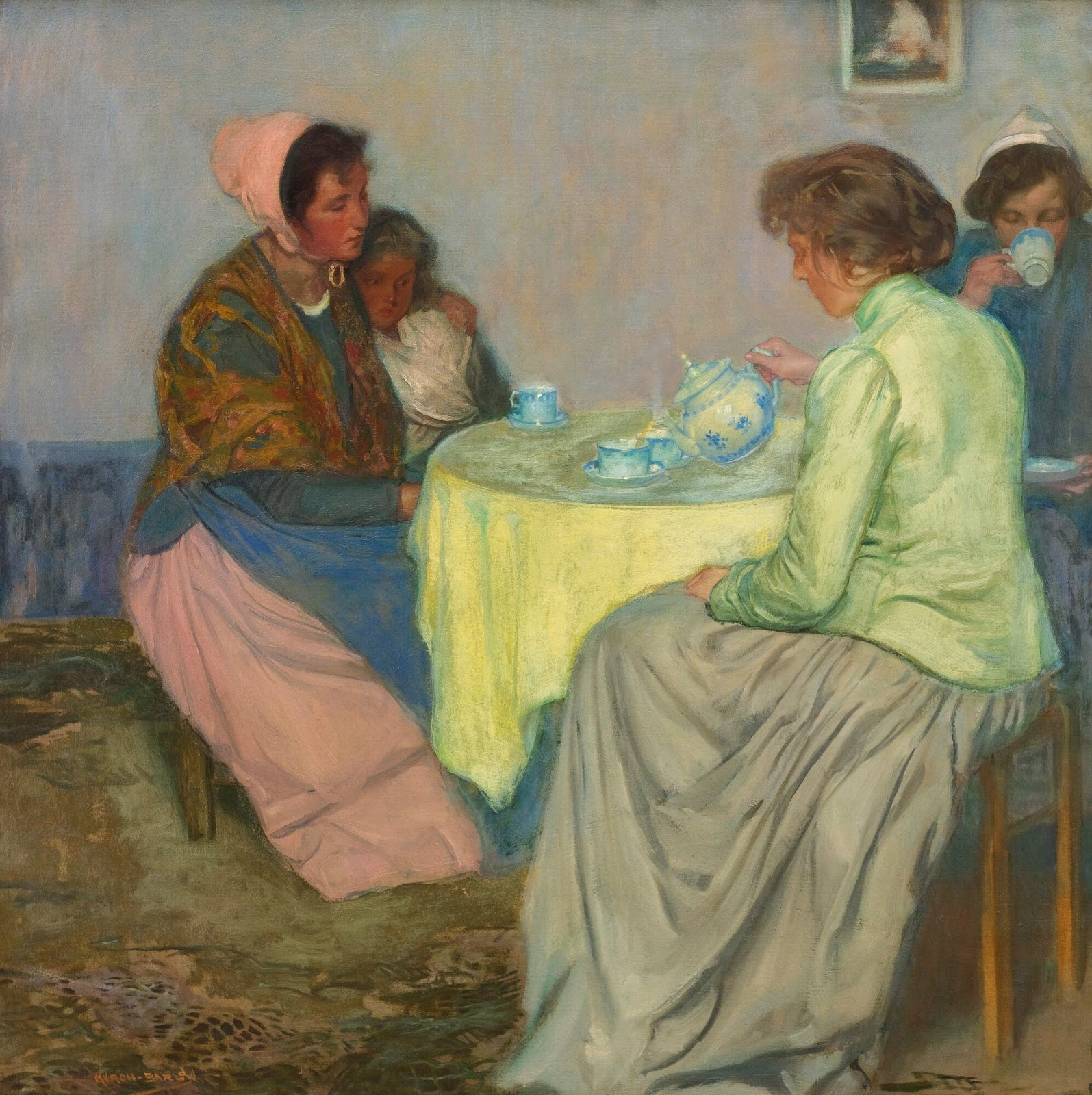
Dutch women drinking coffee or Hospitality. Entry in Beaux Arts Salon, 1908.

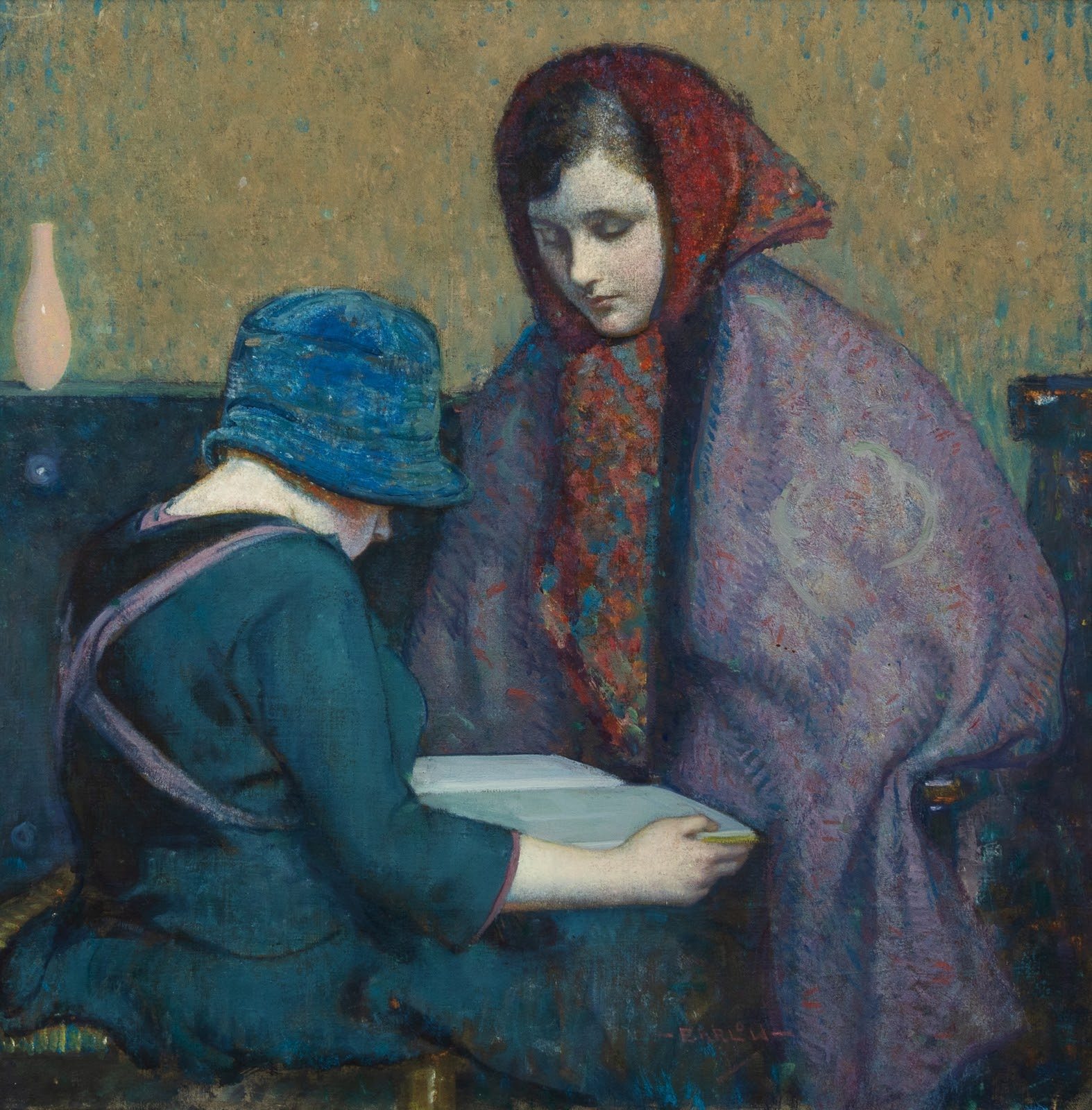
untitled

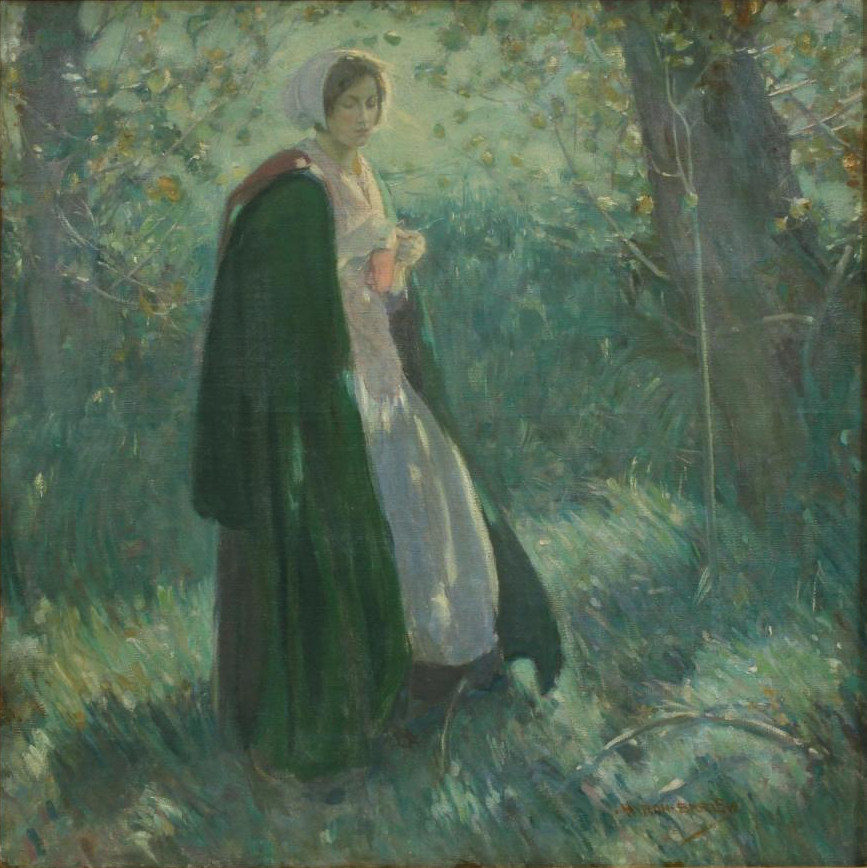
Shepherdess, by 1911. 24th Annual Exhibition, Chicago Art Institute. Possibly the painting titled Reveries in 1918 featuring Julie Sailly.

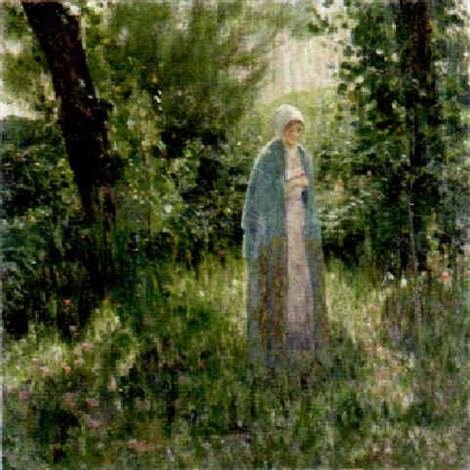
In the field. May also be the painting titled Reveries.

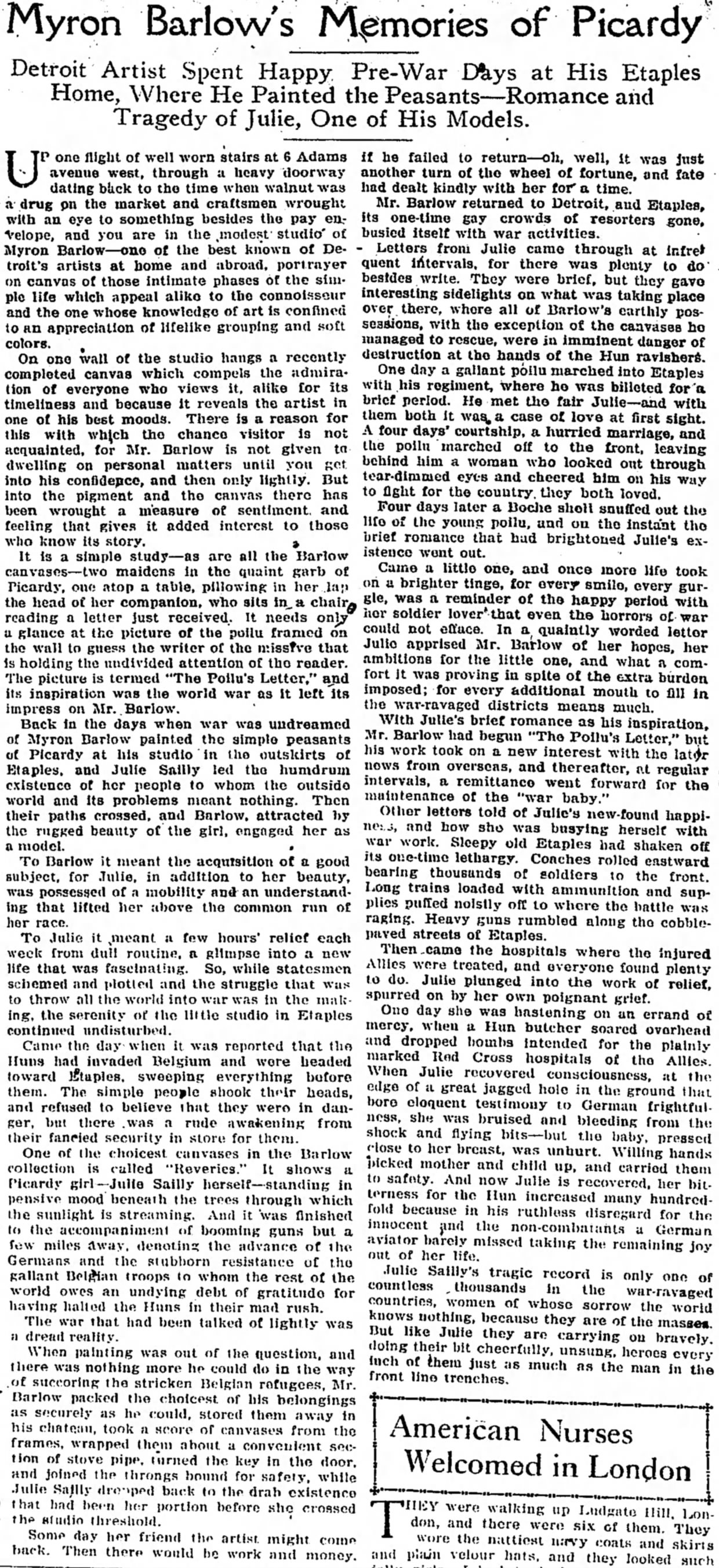
Myron Barlow memories of Picardy during 1918, as WW1 dominated French life, featuring story of Julie Sailly

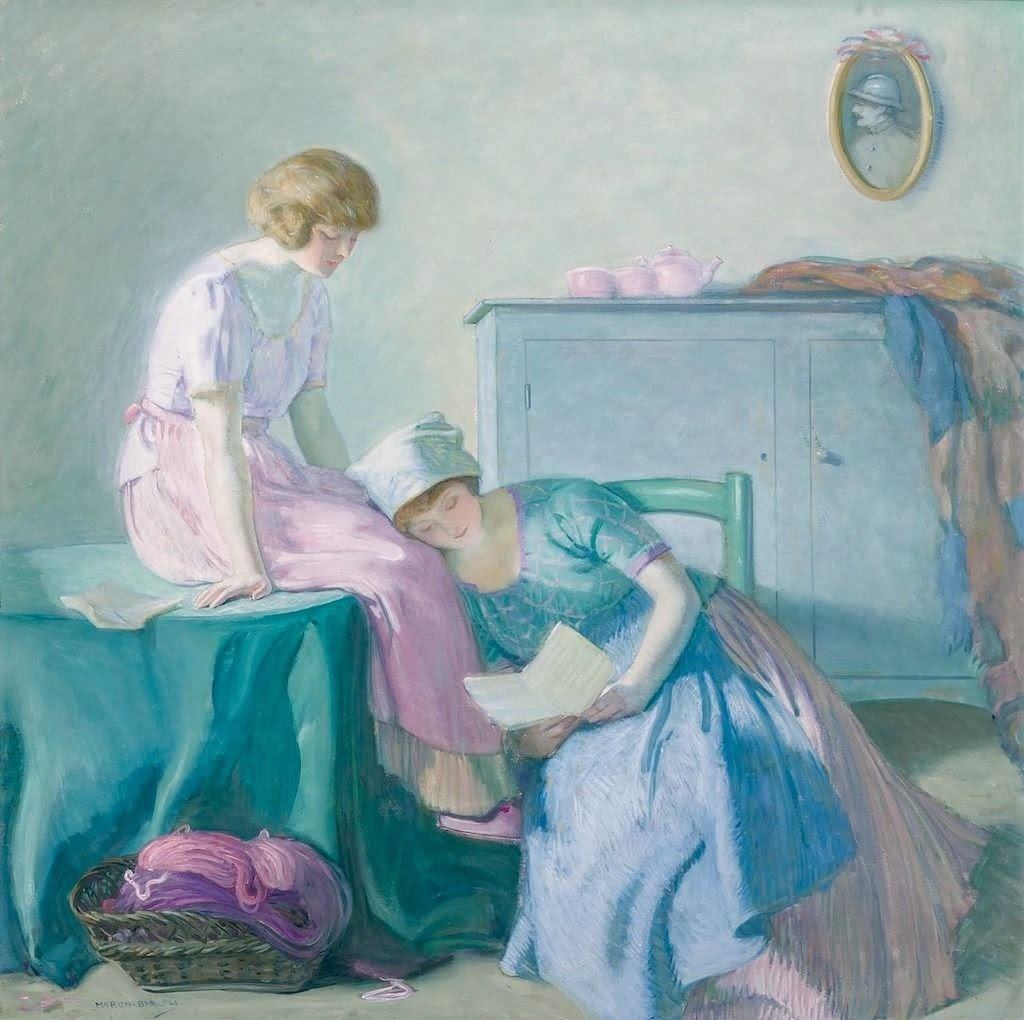
Afternoon Read or The Poilu's Letter, 1918, featuring Julie Sailly reading a letter from her soldier.

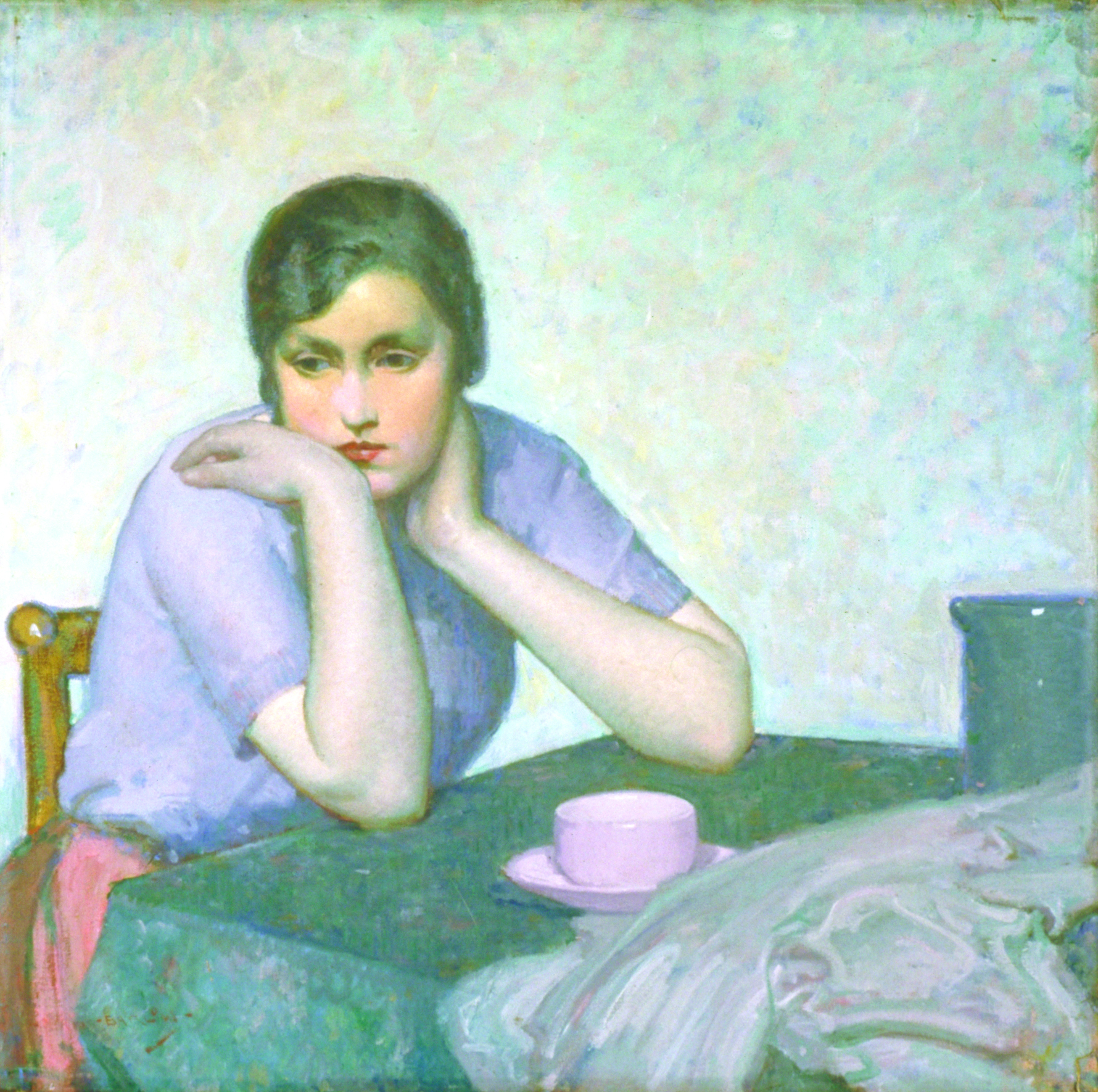
Louise belle femme or Louise Pretty Woman, Étaples, Quentovic Museum (in French). The model was Louise Perrault.

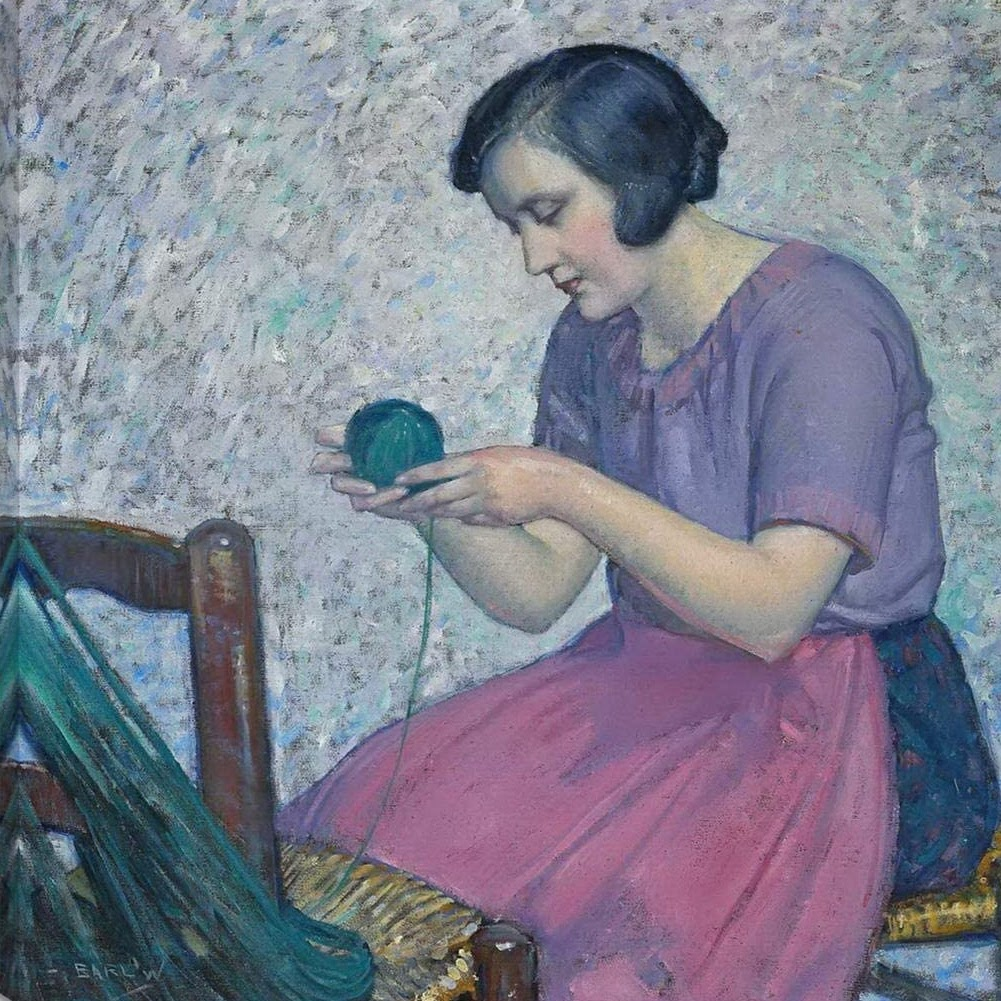
Winding yarn. The model was Louise Descharles. Collections of the Pas-de-Calais Department Council Probably early 1930s.

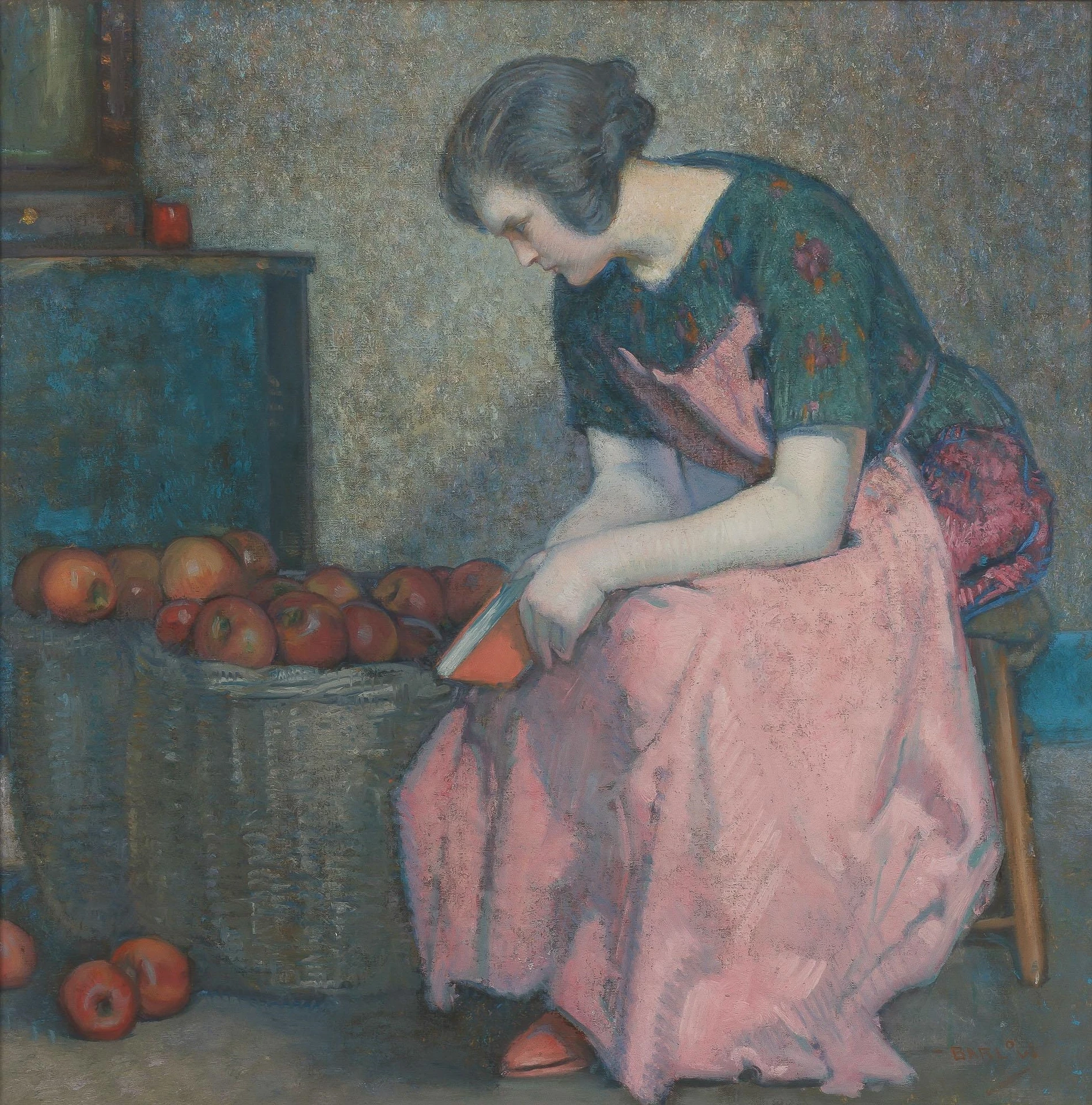
Lady with apples

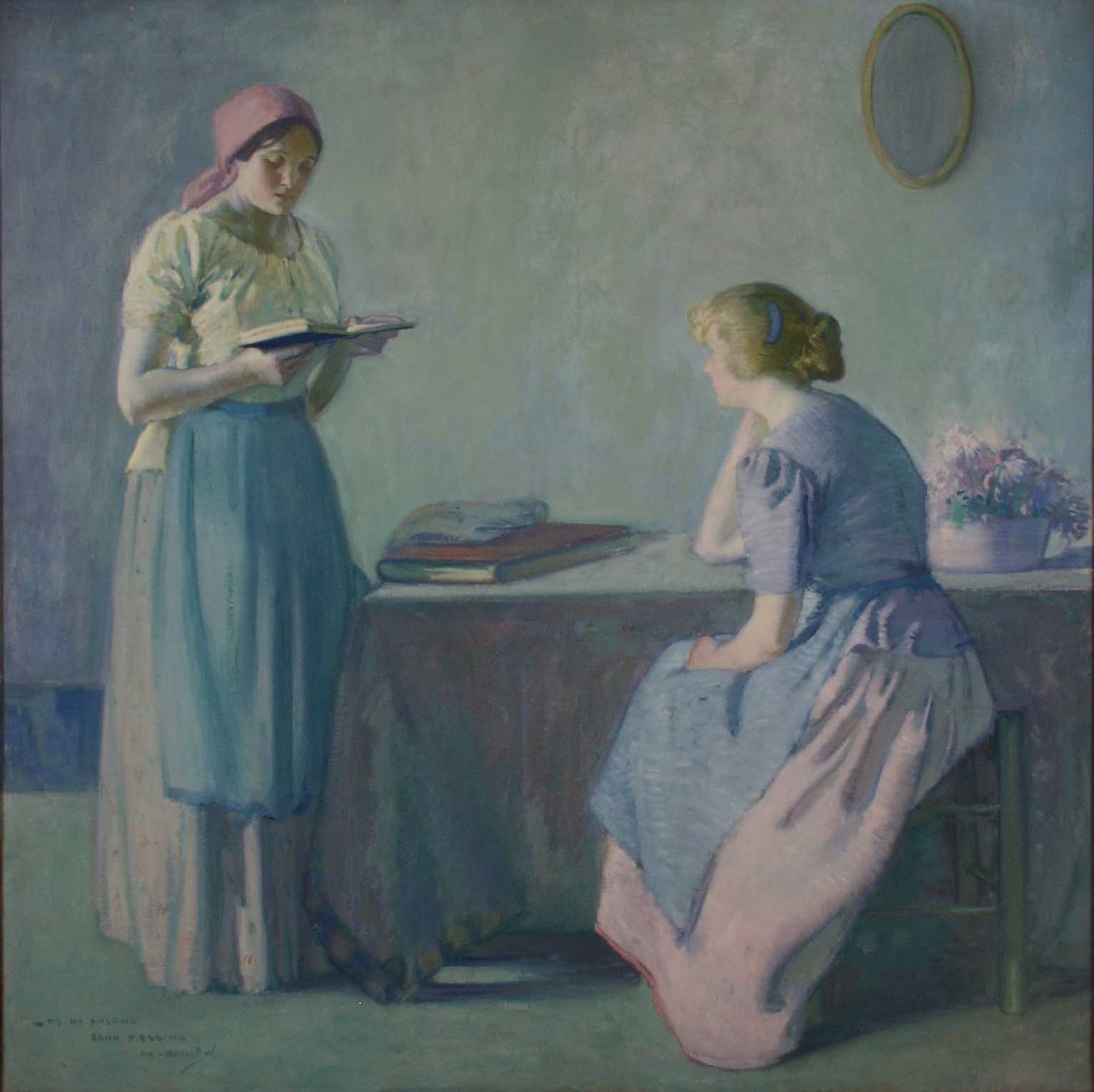
Two women. Caption reads "To my friend [John Pressing] M Barlow". Collection of Rahr West Art Museum, Manitowoc, Wisconsin, gift of Ned Mac Williams, 84.1

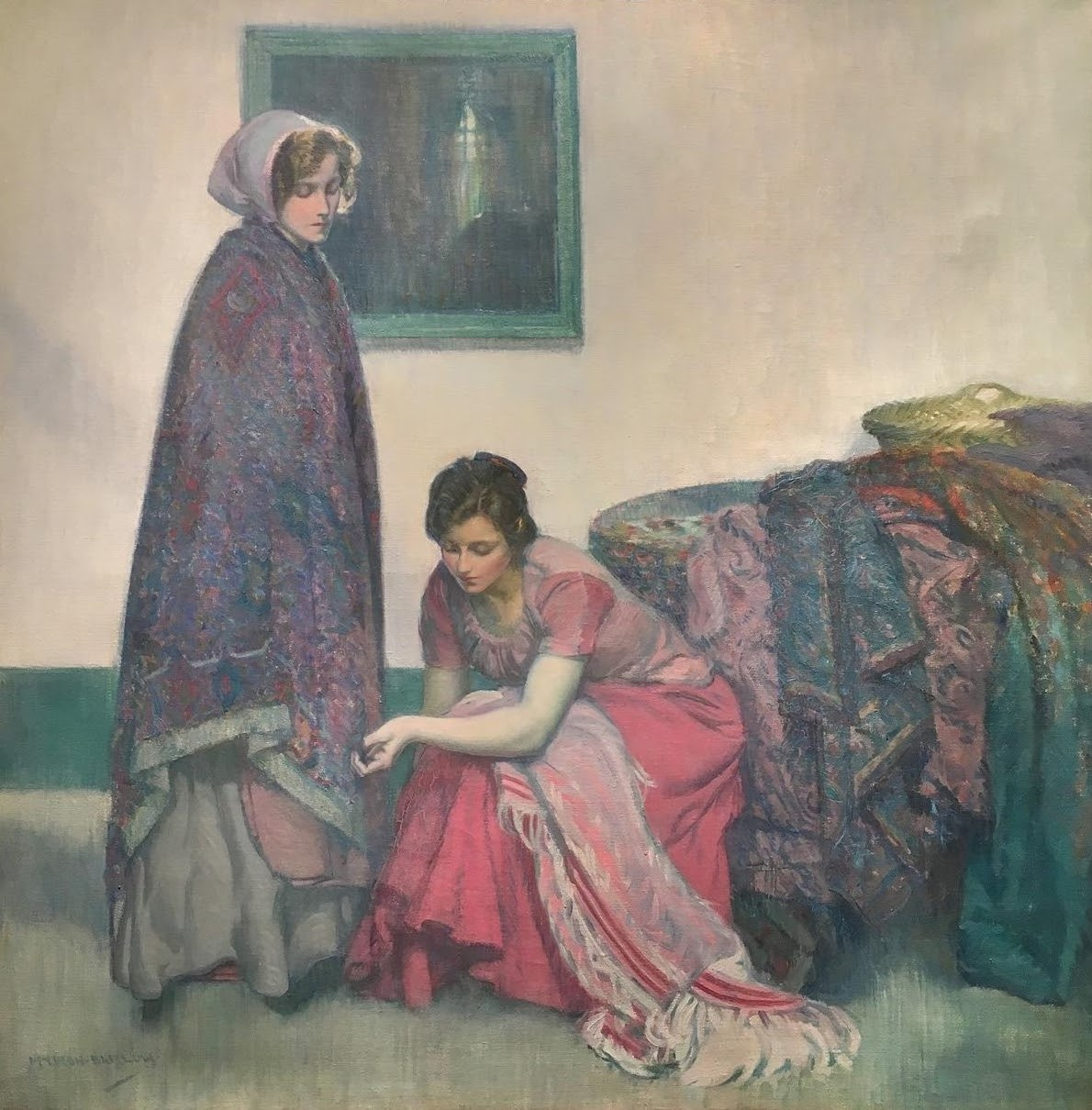
Seamstress or Old Shawls, Paris Salon des Beaux Arts, 1913, entry 64.

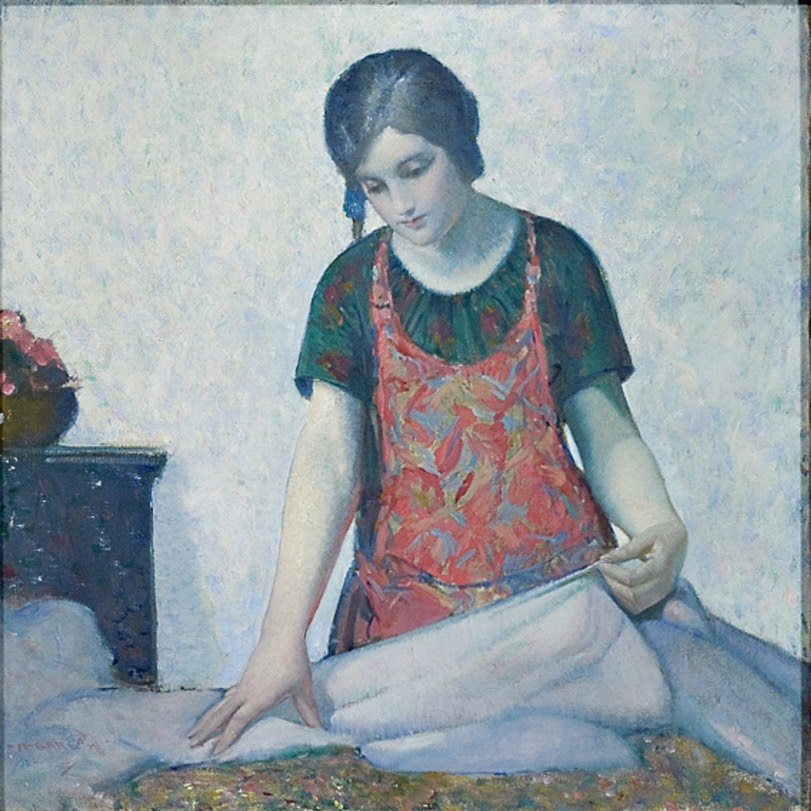
Laundress. The model was Louise Descharles. Collections of the Pas-de-Calais Department Council

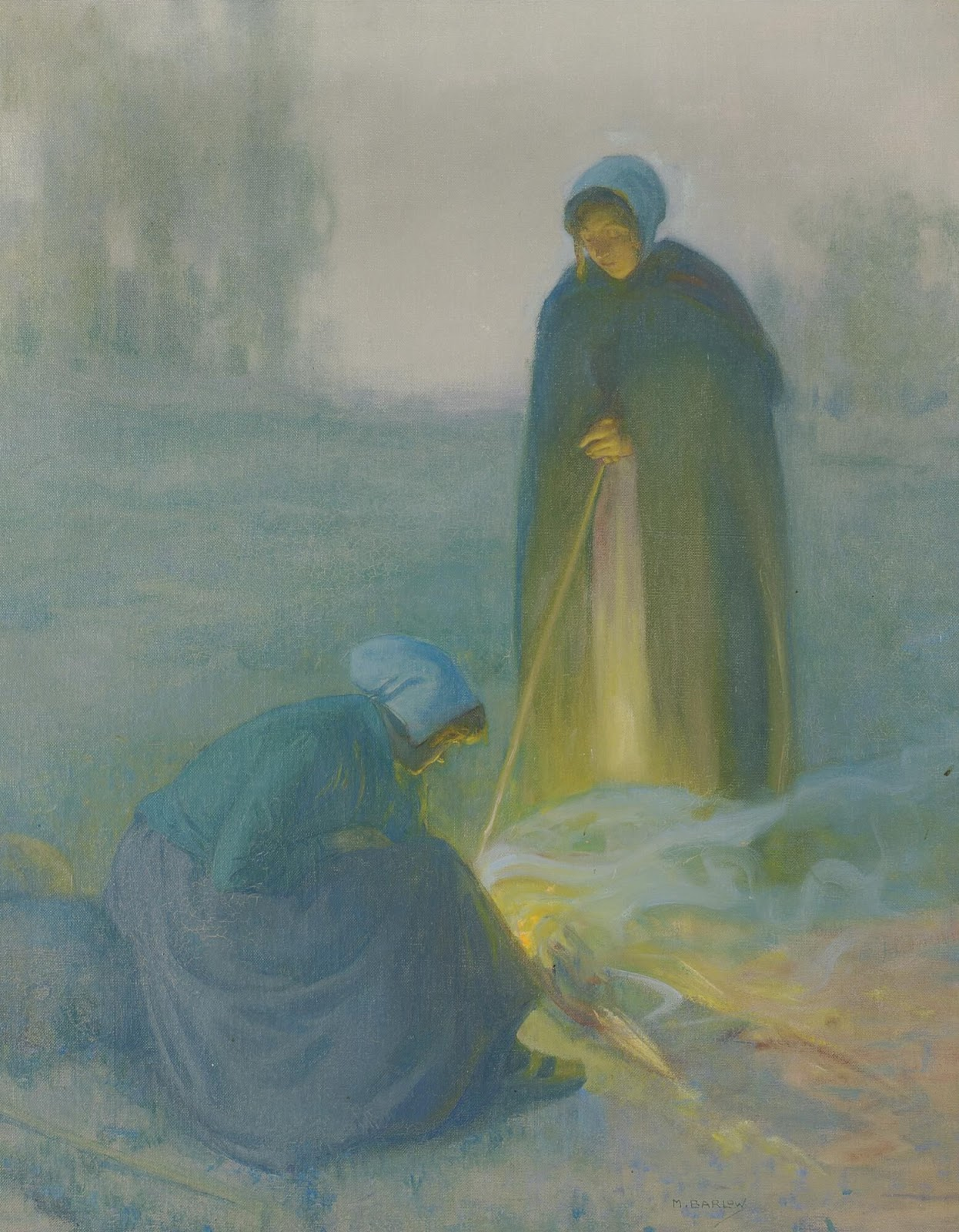
By the fire. 1912

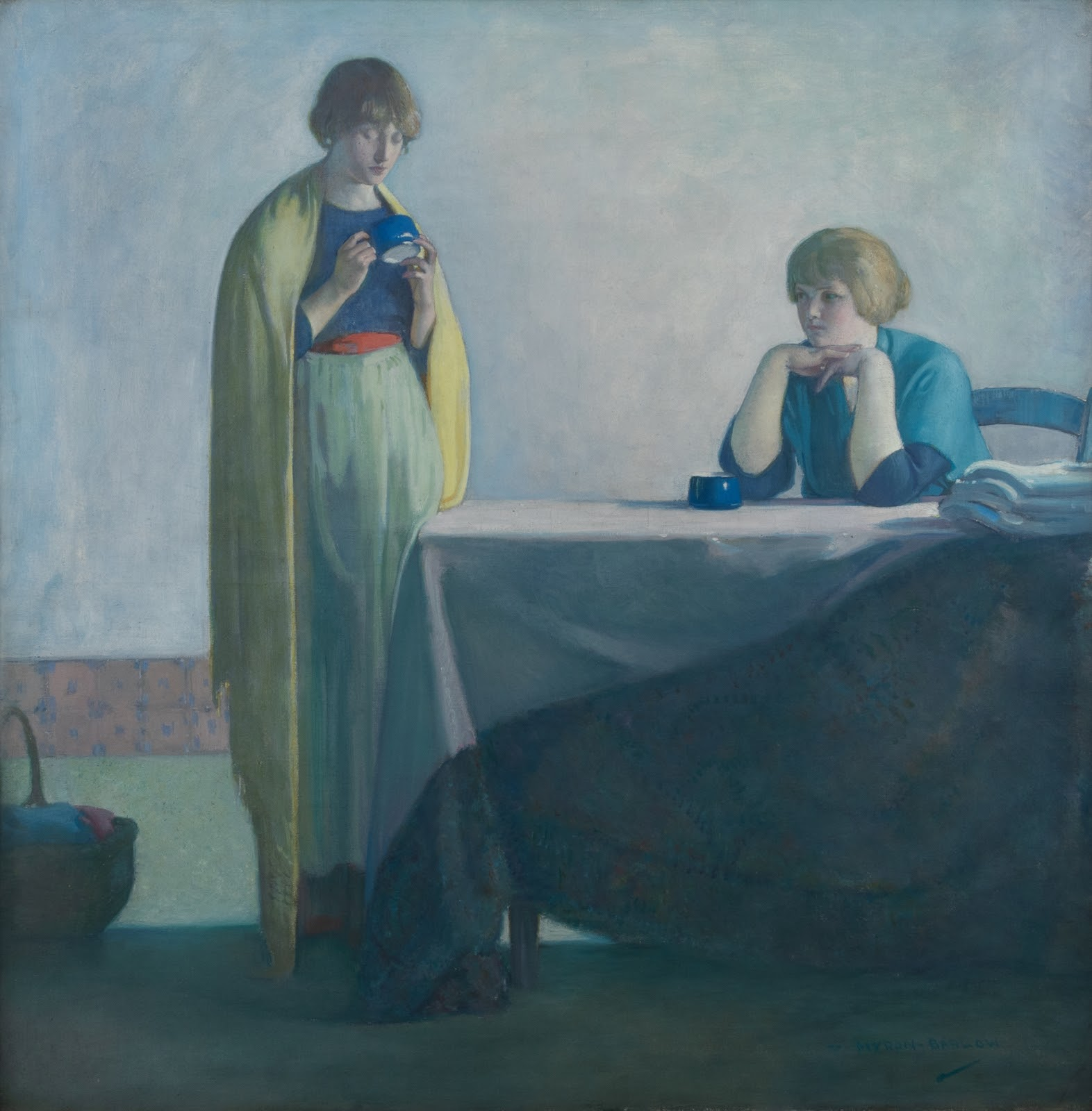
Sharing a drink

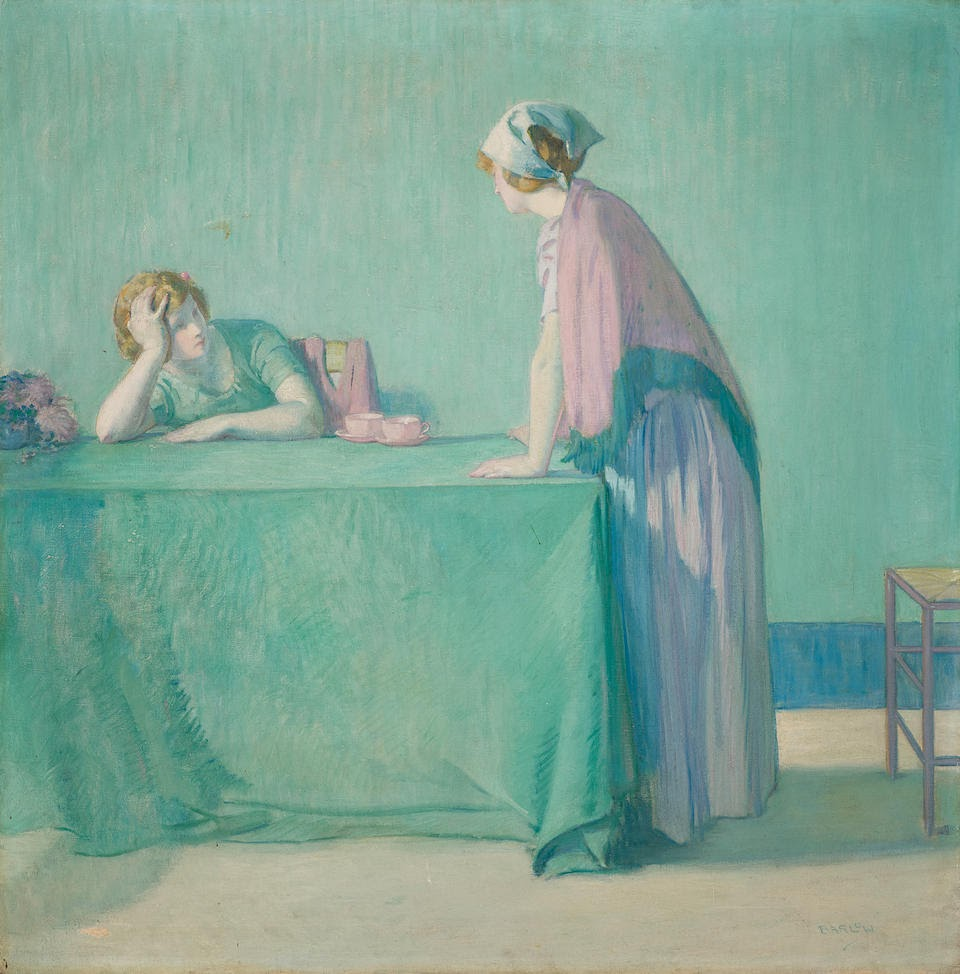
Tea for two

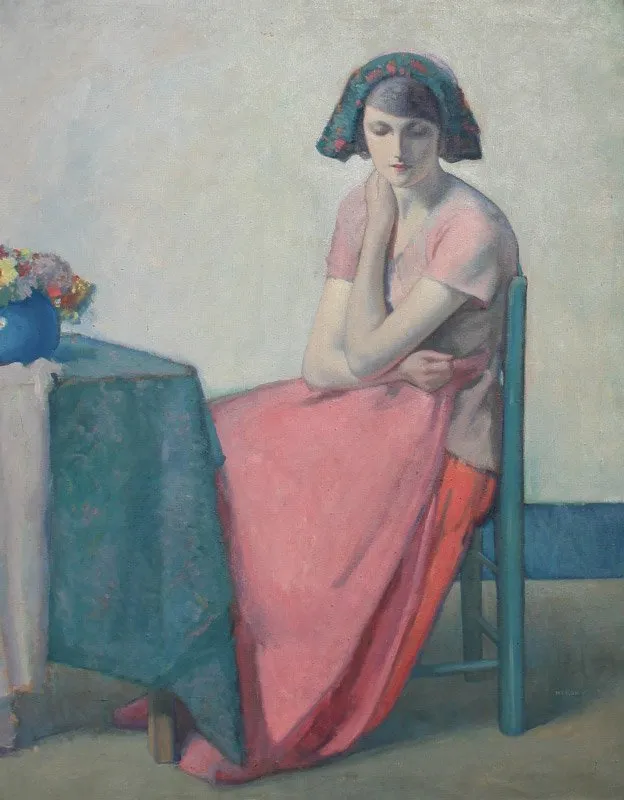
unitled

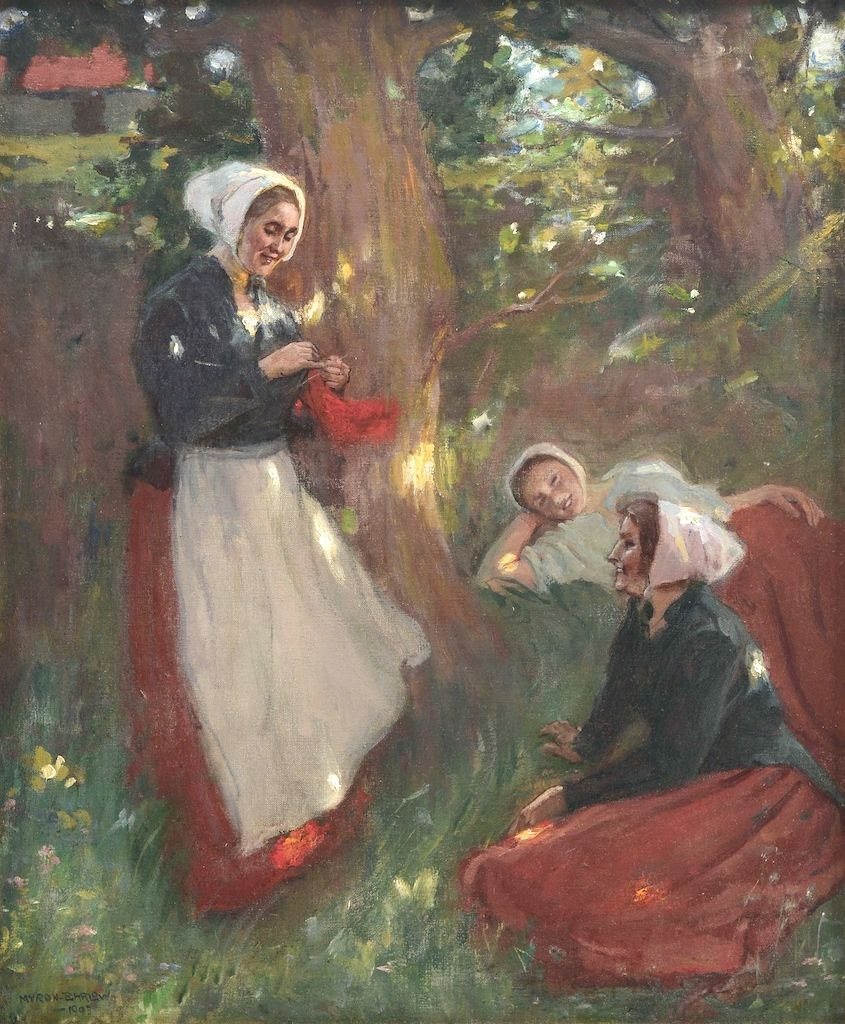
Idle Conversation, 1903

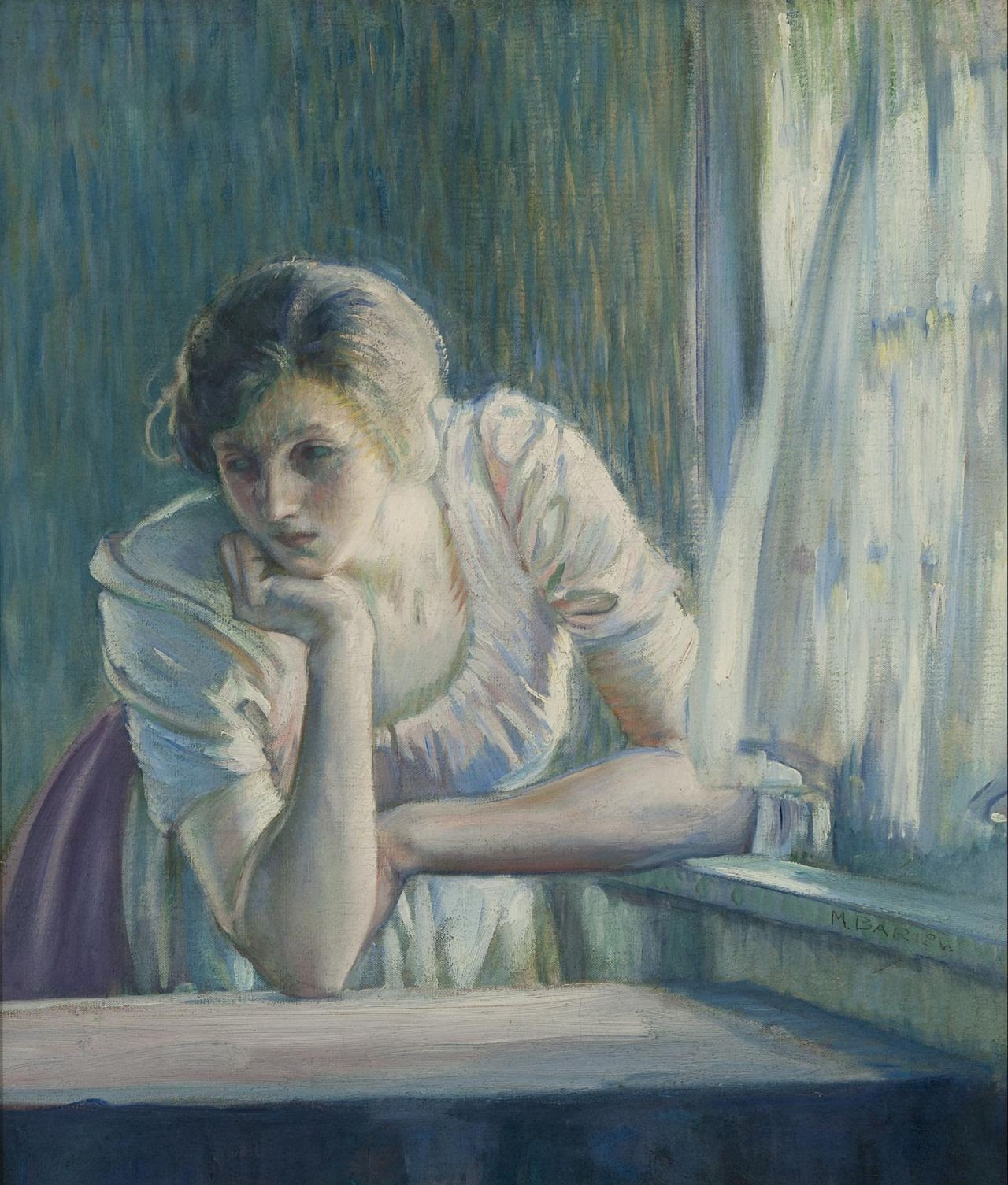
title unknown

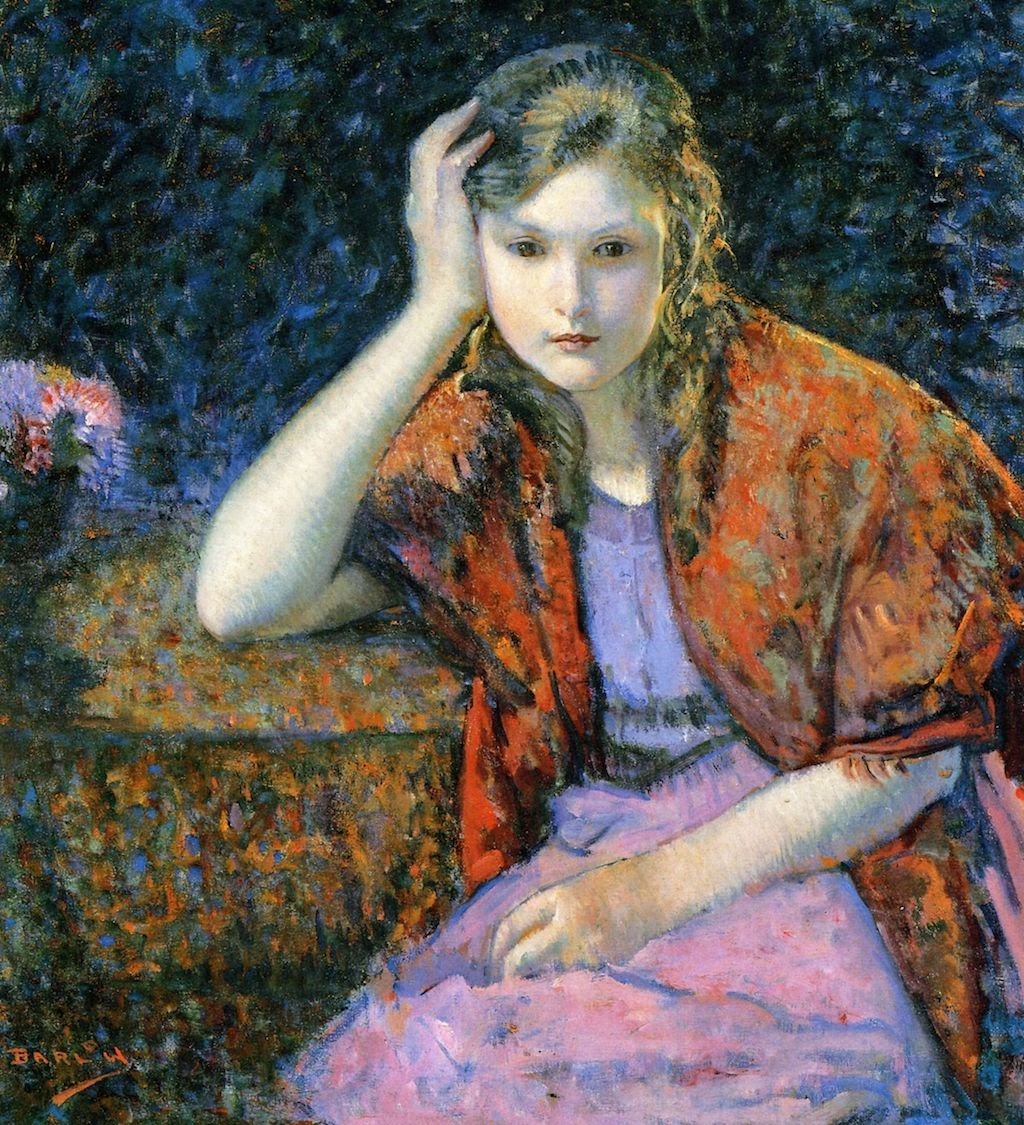
Portrait of a Young Woman

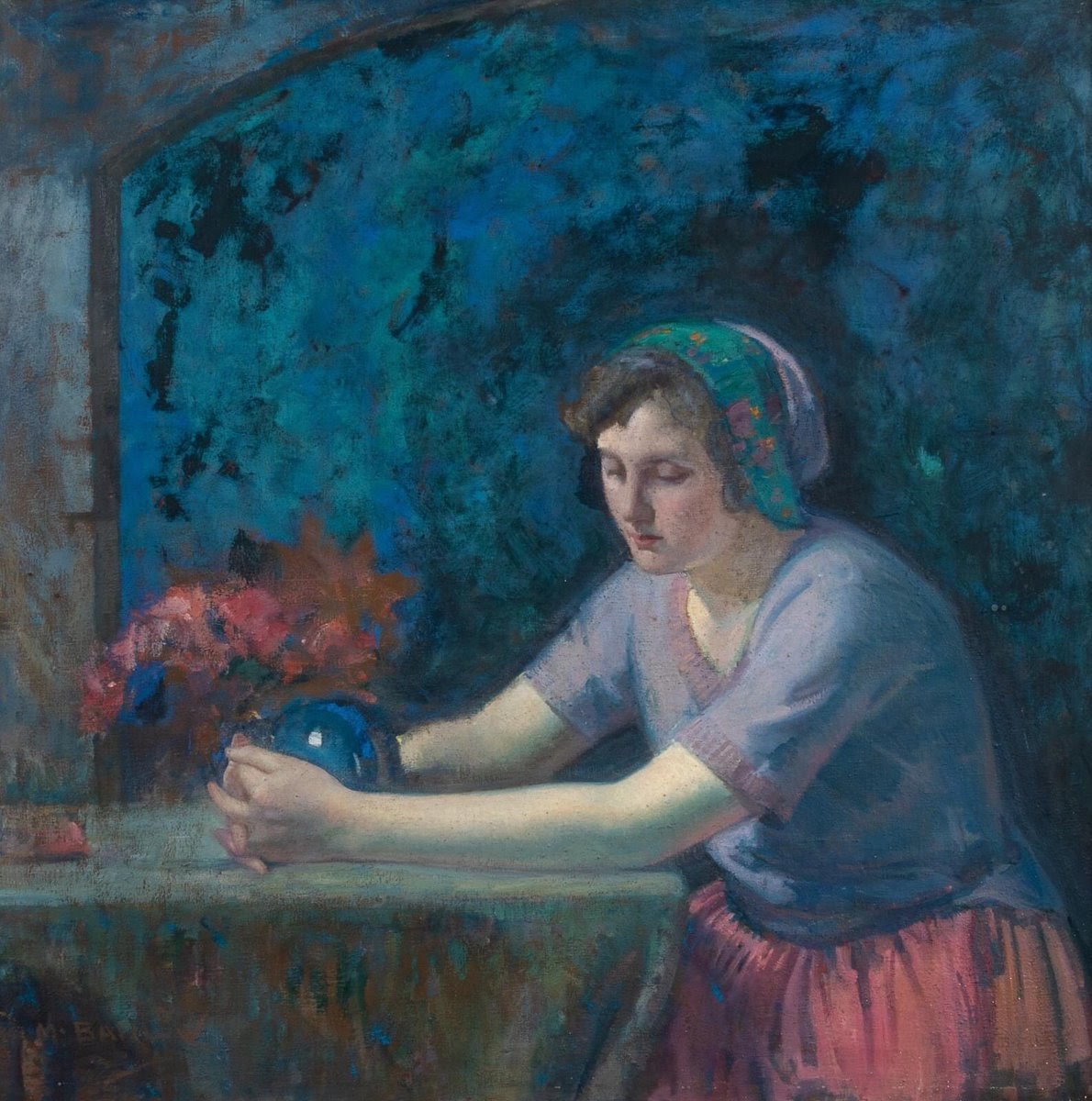
The Crystal Ball

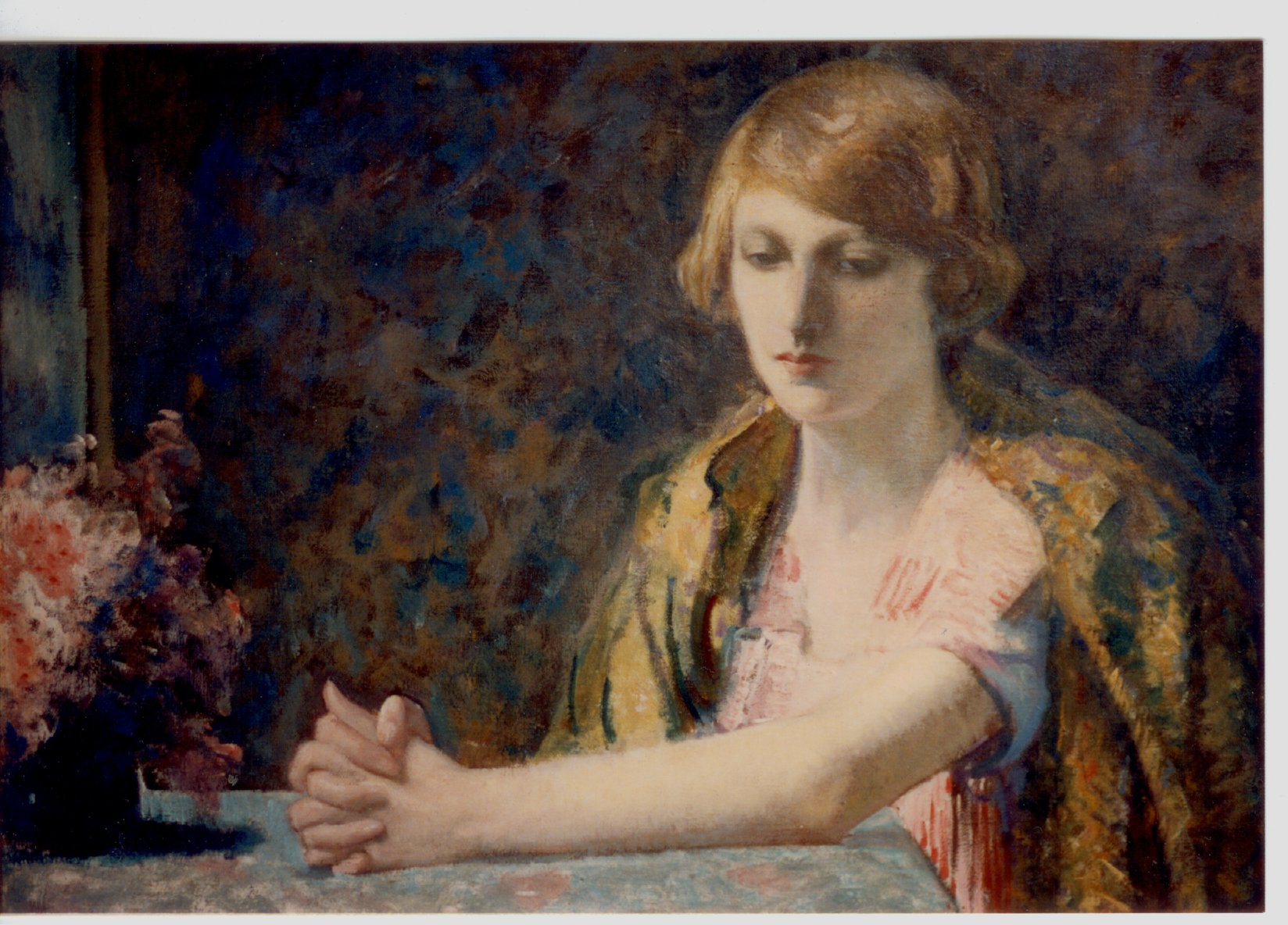
Jeune Femme assise or Young Woman seated. Musée du Touquet

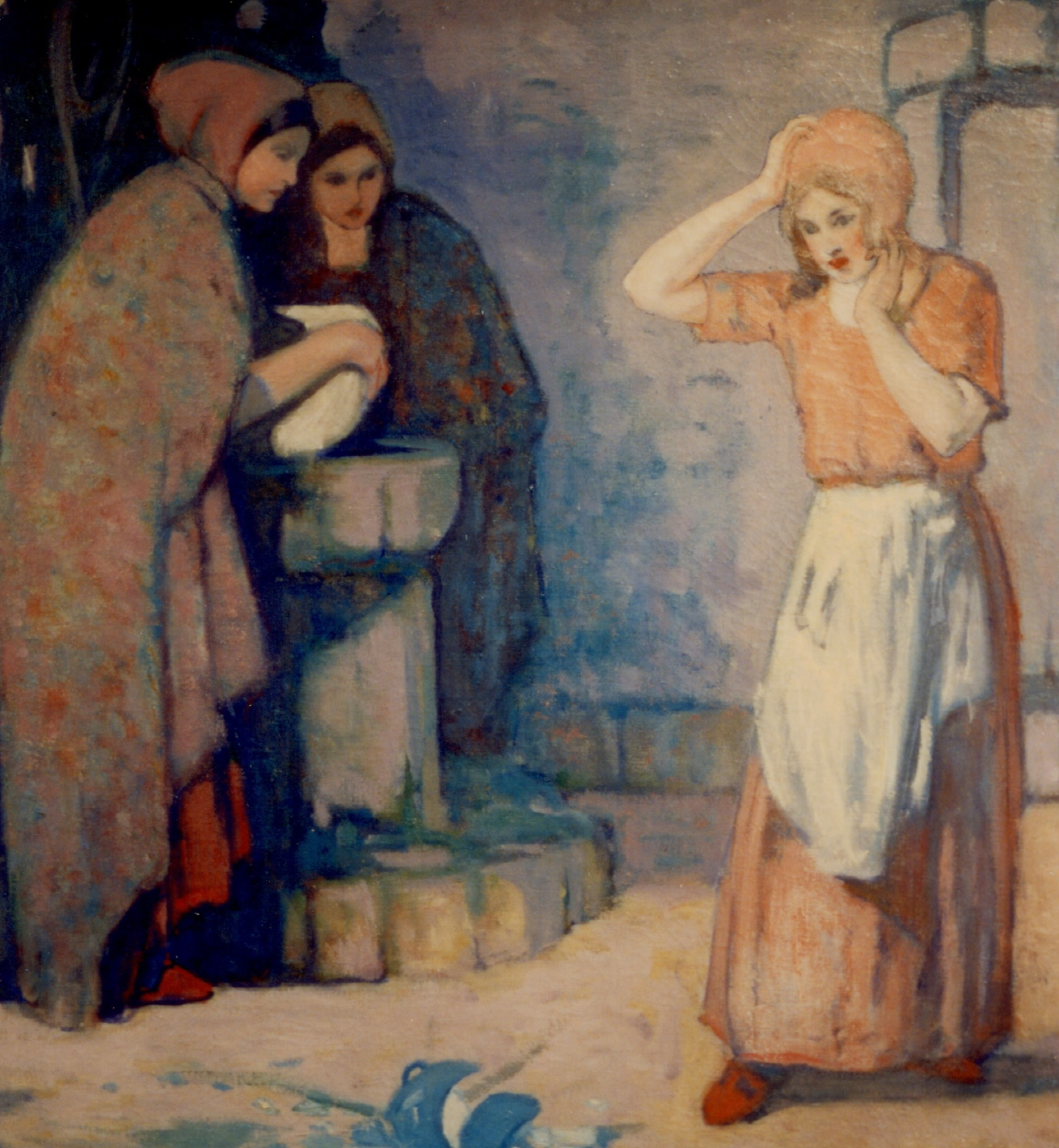
Broken Jug

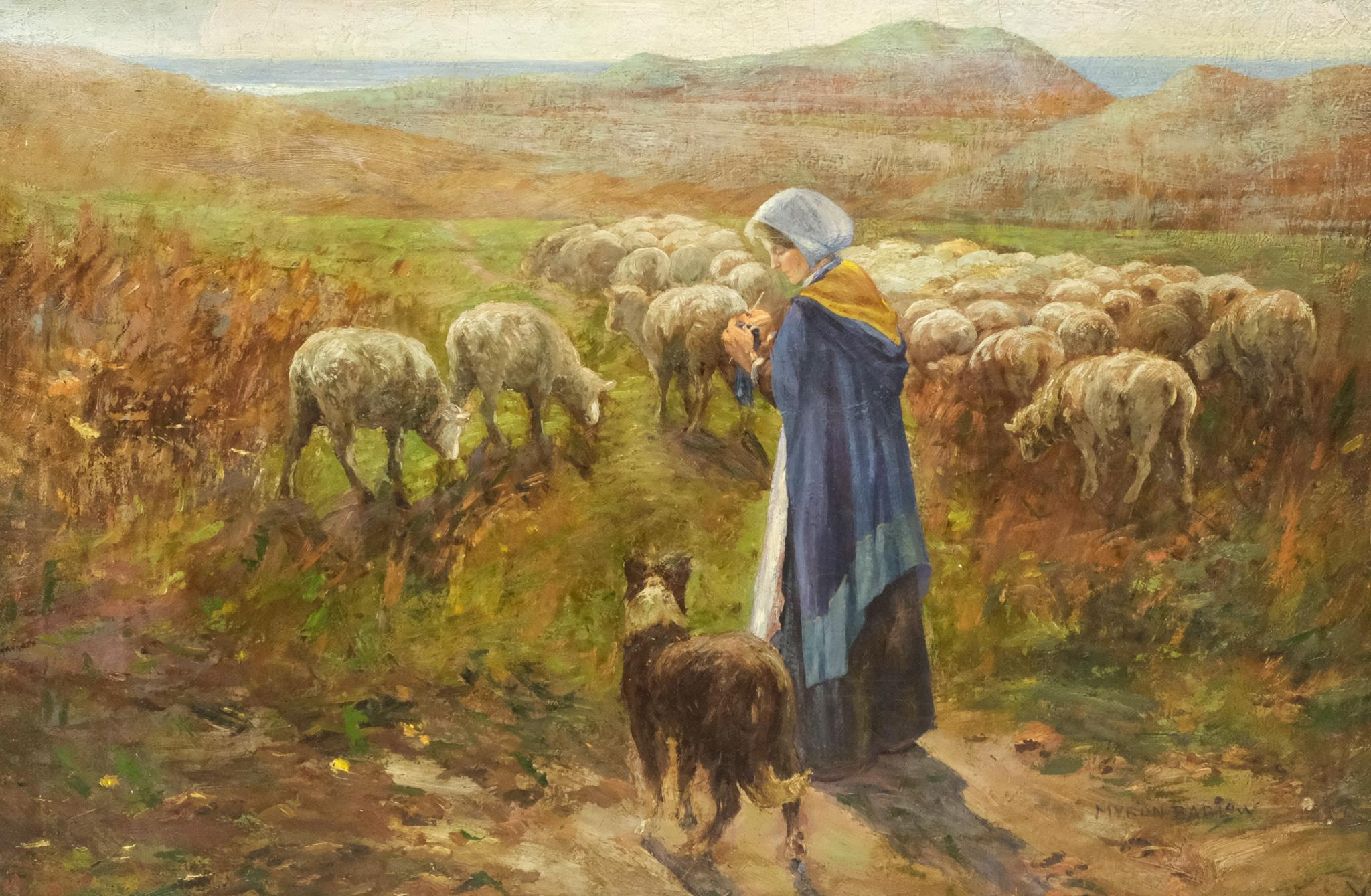
The Shepherdess

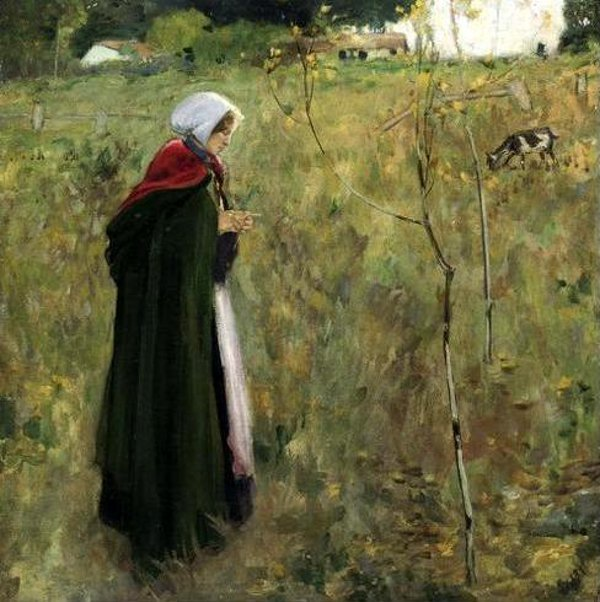
The shepherdess

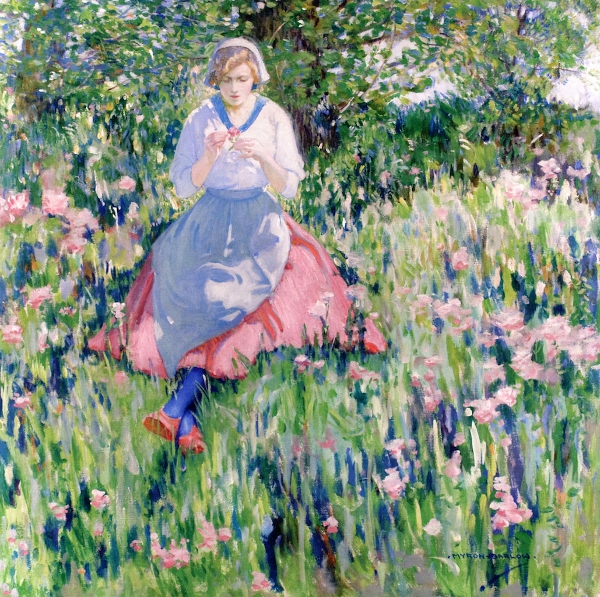
Wild carnations

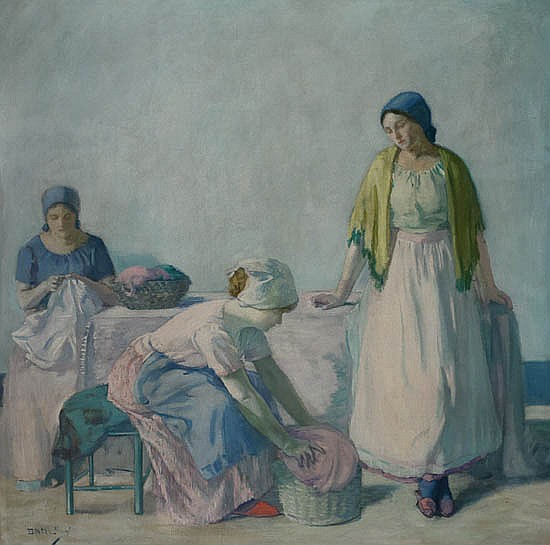
Three sisters

== Honors ==
- Chevalier de la Légion d'honneur. Knight of the Legion of Honor. In 1932, he was named a knight in the national order of the Legion of Honor 2

Barlow listed his honors in 1919:

- Six Academic Medals, Paris
- Gold Medal, First Class, St. Louis Exposition, 1904
- Gold Medal, First Class, San Francisco Exposition, 1914
- Hors Concours [special status, no longer has to compete to get paintings entered], Paris Salon of Société Nationale des Beaux-Arts
- Member of the Paris Jury for Panama-Pacific Exposition
- Member of the Jury in Paris for the Pennsylvania Academy of Fine Arts Exhibition
- Societaire [full member] Societe Nationale des Beaux Arts Salon, Paris
- Member Paris Society of American Painters
- Member Societe Internationale des Peintres et Sculpteurs, Paris
- Member Societe Internationale des Beaux Arts et des Lettres, Paris
- Member American Art Association, Paris
- Member Philadelphia Art Club

== Salon entries ==
- 1901 Fisher Girl Mending Nets (actually an entry to the Society of Oil Painters, London) Listed as one of the Americans with paintings in the Salon
- 1904 Entry 82 Grand-père (Grandfather)

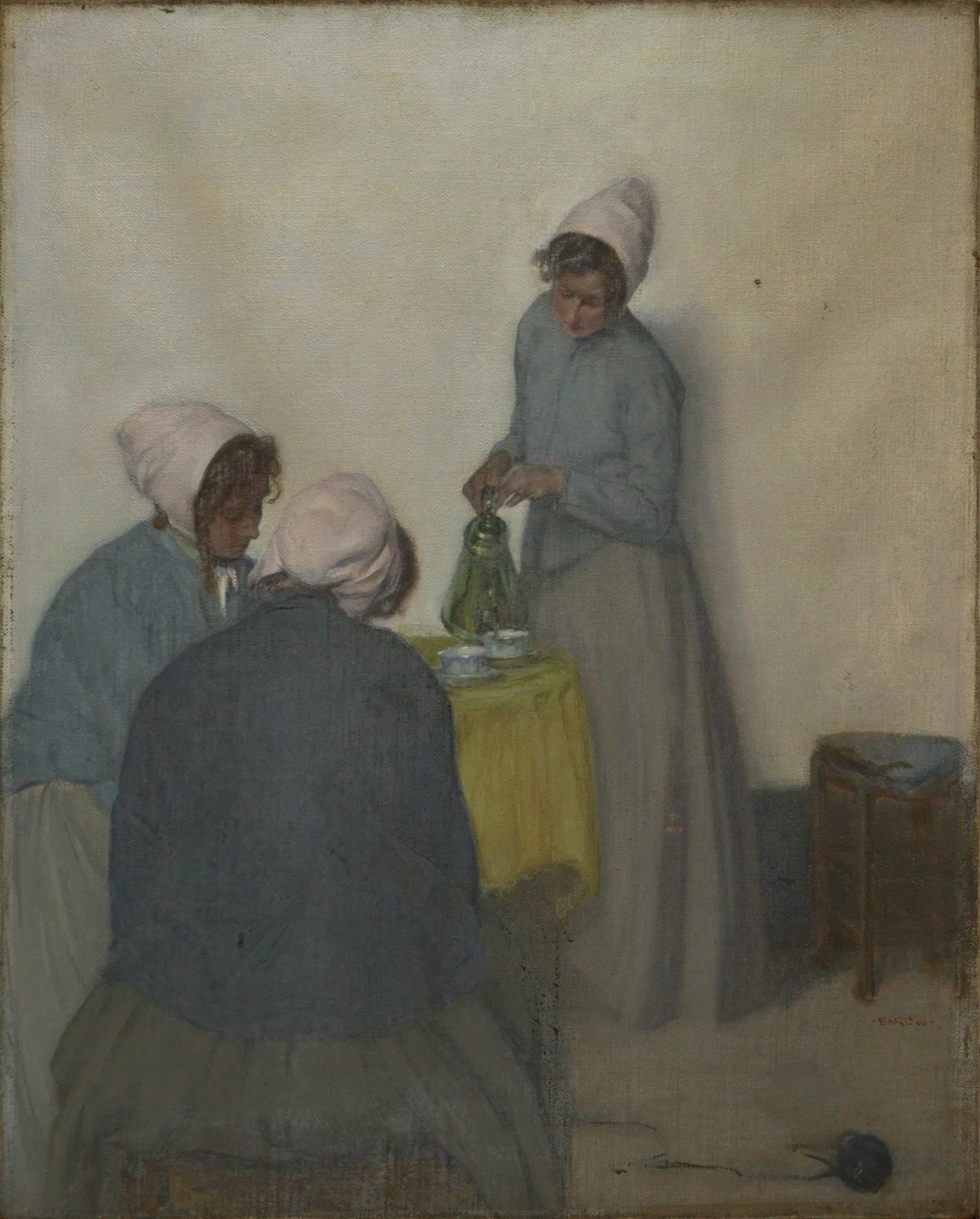
Tasse de café, 1907 entry for Paris Salon. 1907 was the year he was elected to the Société Nationale des Beaux-Arts. He gained full membership in 1912.

- 1905 Cinderella, Early Morning in Brittany, 2 portraits with unknown titles
- 1906 Les curieuse (The Curious) and Consolation maternelle (Maternal Consolation)
- 1907 Entry 57 Le dévidage and entry (58) Tasse de café
- 1908 Entry 56. Hospitalité, entry 57 La bergère bleue, entry 58 La visite, entry 59 La lettre
- 1909 "[unnamed] dreamy studies of Normandy women in gray blues and mauves"
- 1910 "[unnamed] delicate genre studies"
- 1911
- 1912 The Choice, The Toilette , A Girl Reading The Choice, By the Fire
- 1913, 6 paintings (as a Societaire). Le Crochet Old Shawls, Winding, A Sad Novel
- 1914, 5 paintings entered (as a Societaire).
- 1915 No Salon due to World War 1
- 1916 No Salon due to World War 1
- 1917 No Salon due to World War 1
- 1918 No Salon due to World War 1

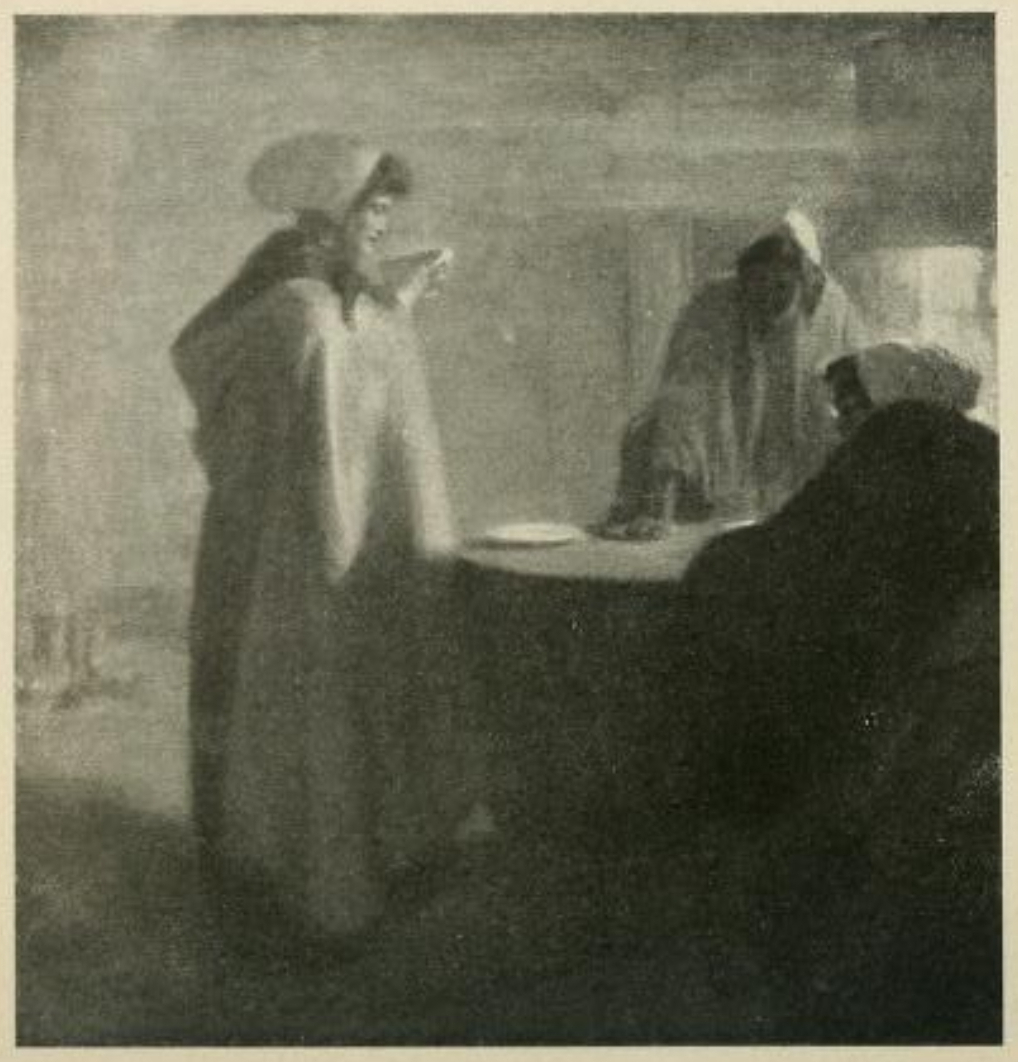
La Bergère Bleue (The Blue Shepherdess), 1908 Salon entry

- 1921 Contemplation, Tales of Picardy
- 1922 Sans Nouvelles

== Titles of other works ==
These may or may not have been at the Paris Salon

- 1901 The Fisherman's Daughter, displayed at the Chicago Art Institute
- 1907 at the Detroit Museum of Art: Maternal Consolations, Curios, On the Dunes, Moonrise, Bringing Home the Cows, Snowballs, Burning Weeds

== Works in public collections ==
=== France ===
- Étaples, Quentovic Museum (in French), Louise belle femme (Louise beautiful woman), oil on canvas
- Le Touquet-Paris-Plage Museum - Édouard Champion (in French)
  - Cruche cassée (Broken jug), oil on canvas, 75 × 75 cm, circa 1932, gift from the artist to the museum
  - Jeune fille assise (Young Woman seated), oil on canvas, 75 × 75 cm, circa 1932, gift from the artist to the museum
- Collections of the Pas-de-Calais Department Council
  - Laundress
  - Tales of Picardy
  - Winding yarn
  - Portrait of an Etaples Seaman
  - Chrysanthemums

=== United States ===
- Asheville Art Museum, Woman arranging flowers, c. 1915
- Detroit Institute of Arts
  - A Cup of Tea (1890s)
  - Apples (c. 1914)
- Cranbrook Educational Community
  - Two Women With A Bowl of Flowers on a Table
  - Young Girl Braiding Her Hair
- Rahr West Art Museum, Two Women
- Saginaw Art Museum, untitled, woman resting in firelit room

== Works in private collections ==
- Confidences, circa 1910, oil on canvas, 120 × 120 cm
- Art in the Bethel Community Transformation Center
  - 1 of 4
  - 2 of 4
  - 3 of 4 Portrait of Albert Kahn, designer of the Bethel-El Synagogue Myron Barlow's signature is on the painting's bottom.
  - 4 of 4

== See also ==
- Etaples art colony
