= National Register of Historic Places listings in Detroit =

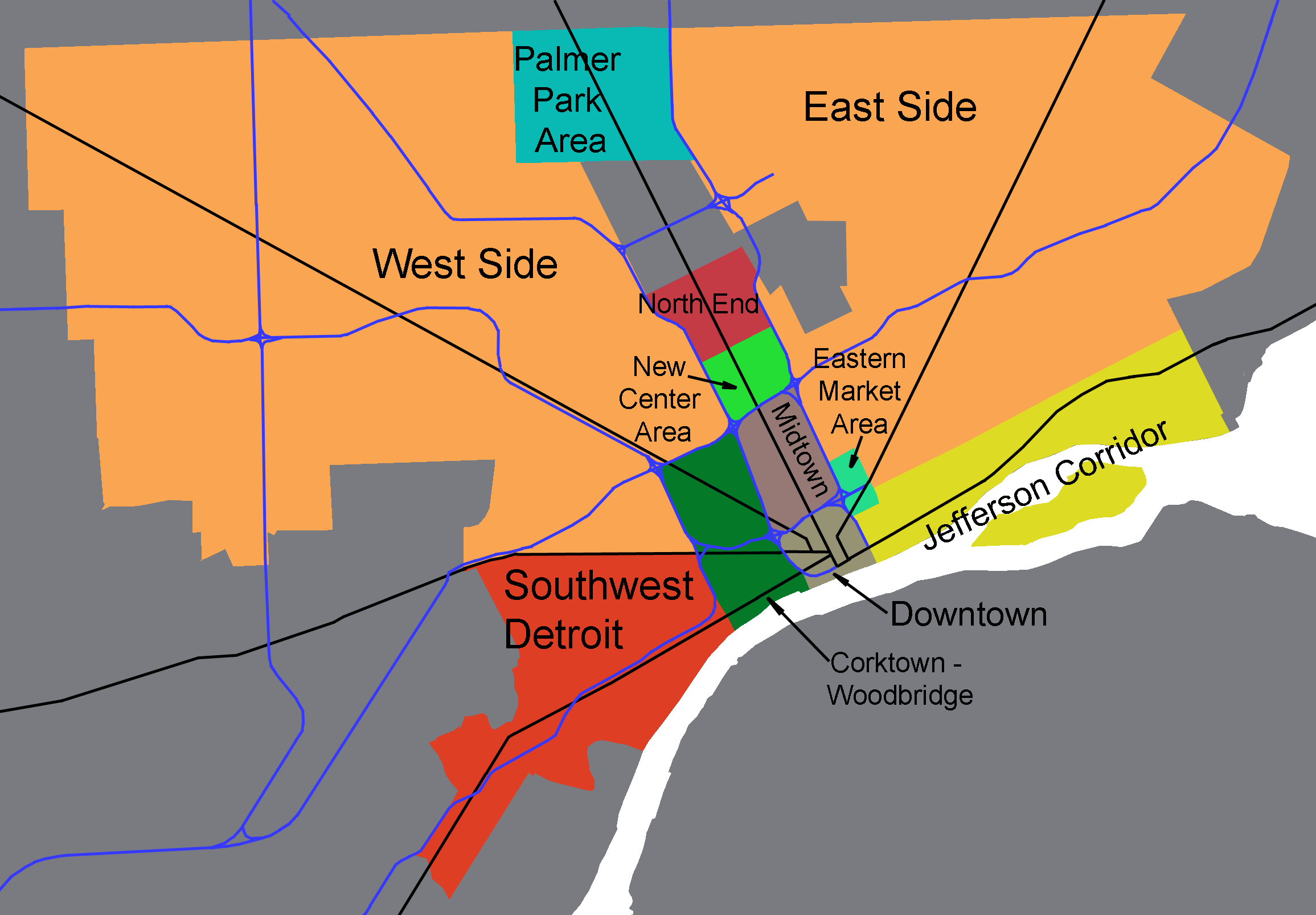
City of Detroit areas

This is a list of the National Register of Historic Places listings in Detroit, Michigan.

This is intended to be a complete list of the properties and districts on the National Register of Historic Places in Detroit, Michigan, United States. Latitude and longitude coordinates are provided for many National Register properties and districts; these locations may be seen together in an online map.

There are 364 properties and districts listed on the National Register in Wayne County, including 14 National Historic Landmarks. The city of Detroit is the location of 283 of these properties and districts, including 10 National Historic Landmarks; those outside downtown and midtown are listed here, while the properties and districts outside Detroit, including 4 National Historic Landmarks, are listed separately. A single property straddles the city limits and thus appears on both lists.

This National Park Service list is complete through NPS recent listings posted November 6, 2026.

== Geographical areas ==
The properties on this list are within the city of Detroit but outside of the Downtown/Midtown area bounded by the Lodge Freeway (M-10) to the west, the Edsel Ford Freeway (I-94) on the north, the Chrysler Freeway (I-75) and Interstate 375 on the east, and the Detroit River to the south. Properties on this list are further divided into geographical areas:

- New Center Area: North of Midtown and bounded by the Lodge Freeway on the west, I-94 on the south, Woodward Avenue on the east, and Seward Avenue on the north.
- North End: North of the New Center and bounded by the Woodward Avenue on the west, East Grand Blvd. on the south, I-75 on the east, and Highland Park on the north.
- Palmer Park Area: Bounded by Highland Park and McNichols Rd. on the south, Livernois on the west, Eight Mile on the north, and Woodward on the east.
- Corktown – Woodbridge: West of Downtown and bounded by I-96 to the east, I-94 on the south, the Lodge Freeway to the east, and the Detroit River to the south.
- Southwest Detroit: The section of Detroit west of Corktown – Woodbridge and south of Michigan Avenue.
- Eastern Market Area: The section of Detroit east of Downtown/Midtown and immediately adjacent to Eastern Market.
- Jefferson Corridor: The section of Detroit east of Downtown and Eastern Market and south of Kercheval.
- West Side: The remainder of Detroit not already delineated west of Woodward Avenue.
- East Side: The remainder of Detroit not already delineated east of Woodward Avenue.

There are 156 properties and districts listed on the National Register in Detroit outside of Downtown and Midtown, including five National Historic Landmarks and one property straddling the border with River Rouge, Michigan. There are 126 more properties and districts listed on the National Register in Downtown and Midtown Detroit, including four National Historic Landmarks. These other properties are listed at National Register of Historic Places listings in Downtown and Midtown Detroit.

All together there are 282 properties and districts listed on the National Register in Detroit proper. Nine additional properties and districts, including one National Historic Landmark, are located in the Detroit enclave of Highland Park. Three properties are located in the Detroit enclave of Hamtramck. The properties and districts in these two Detroit enclaves, plus 75 others, are listed in this list of non-Detroit NRHP listings in Wayne County.

	District	# of Sites
1	Downtown and Midtown Detroit	127
2	Remainder of Detroit	156
3	Outer Wayne County, Hamtramck, & Highland Park	92
(Duplicates):		(1)
Total:		374

== History of Detroit ==
=== Beginnings ===
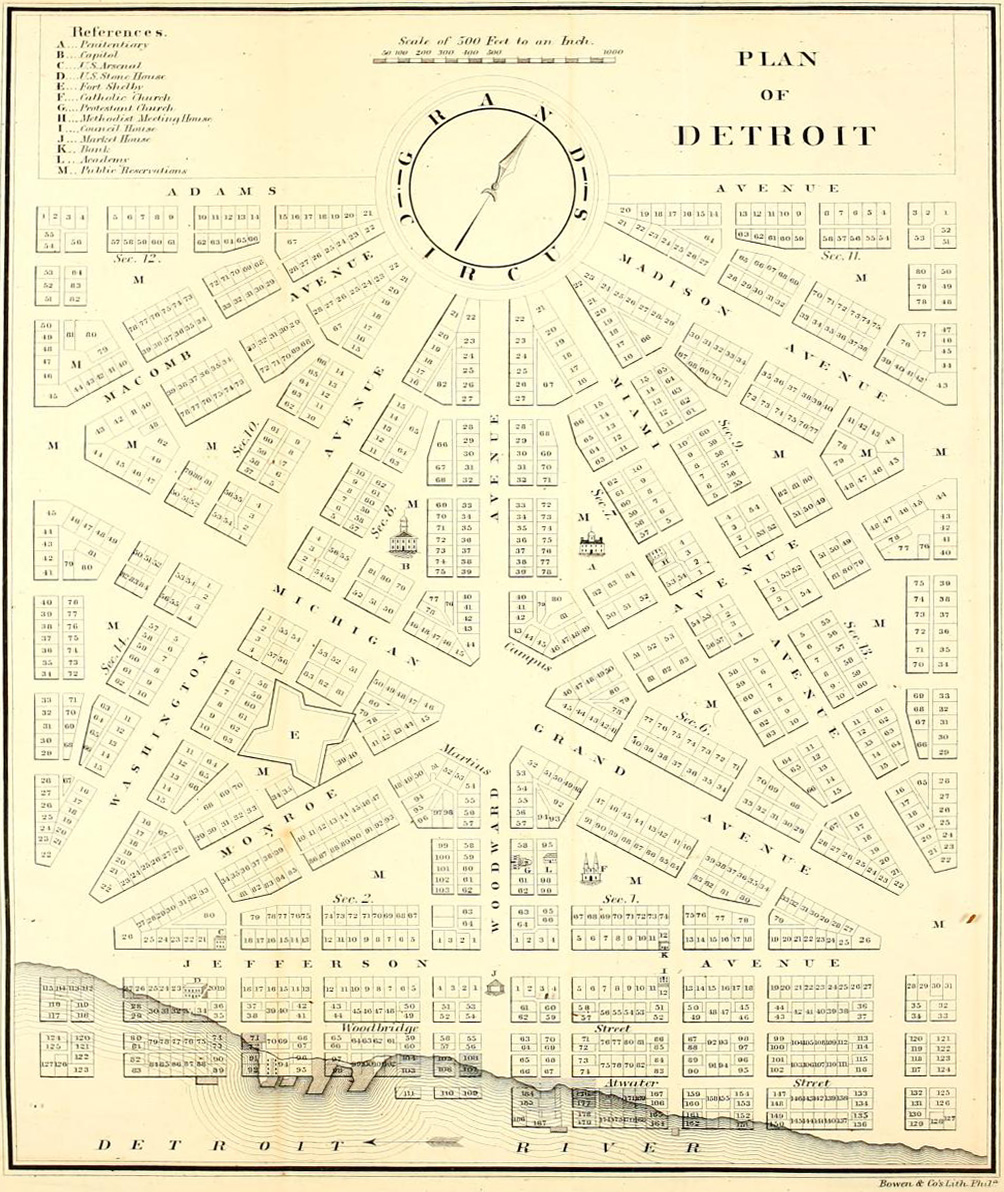
Augustus Woodward's plan for the city following 1805 fire.

Detroit, settled in 1701, is one of the oldest cities in the Midwest. It experienced a disastrous fire in 1805 which nearly destroyed the city, leaving little present-day evidence of old Detroit save a few east-side streets named for early French settlers, their ancestors, and some pear trees which were believed to have been planted by early missionaries. After the fire, Judge Augustus B. Woodward designed a plan of evenly spaced public parks with interconnecting semi-circular and diagonal streets. Although Woodward's plan was not fully implemented, the basic outline in still in place today in the heart of the city. Main thoroughfares radiate outward from the center of the city like spokes in a wheel, with Jefferson Avenue running parallel to the river, Woodward Avenue running perpendicular to it, and Gratiot, Michigan, and Grand River Avenues interspersed. A sixth main street, Fort, wanders downriver from the center of the city.

After Detroit rebuilt in the early 19th century, a thriving community soon sprang up, and by the Civil War, over 45,000 people were living in the city, primarily spread along Jefferson Avenue to the east and Fort Street to the west. As in many major American cities, subsequent redevelopment of the central city through the next 150 years has eliminated all but a handful of the antebellum structures in Detroit. The oldest remaining structures are those built as private residences, including a group in the Corktown neighborhood and another set of houses strung along Jefferson Avenue—notably the Charles Trowbridge House (1826, the oldest known structure in the city), the Joseph Campau House (1835), the Sibley House (1848), the Beaubien House (1851), and the Moross House (1855). Other extant pre-1860 structures include Fort Wayne (1849); Saints Peter and Paul Church (1848) and Mariner's Church (1849); and scattered commercial buildings (one in Randolph Street Commercial Buildings Historic District, for example); Unfortunately, the demolition of historic structures continues into the present day: multiple structures listed on the Register, including the Alexander Chene House (1855), have been demolished in the last decade.

=== Rise of industry and commerce ===
As Detroit grew into a thriving hub of commerce and industry, the city spread along Jefferson, with multiple manufacturing firms taking advantage of the transportation resources afforded by the river and a parallel rail line. The shipyard that eventually became the Dry Dock Engine Works-Detroit Dry Dock Company Complex opened on the Detroit River at the foot of Orleans in 1852; Parke-Davis established a center between East Jefferson Avenue and the river in the 1870s; another pharmaceutical firm, the Frederick Stearns Company, built a plant in the same area in the 1890s. Globe Tobacco built a manufacturing facility closer to downtown in 1888.

The rise of manufacturing led to a new class of wealthy industrialists, entrepreneurs, and professionals. Some of these nouveau riche built along East Jefferson, resulting in structures such as the Thomas A. Parker House (1868), the Croul-Palms House (1881), the William H. Wells House (1889), the John N. Bagley House (1889), and the Frederick K. Stearns House (1902). However, Detroit began increasingly to turn away from the river, and other citizens pushed north of downtown, building houses along Woodward in what was at the time a quiet residential area. Many of these neighborhoods have disappeared under 20th-century commercialization of the Woodward corridor, but some Victorian structures remain, notably the Elisha Taylor House (1870) and the Hudson-Evans House (1872), both near the Woodward East Historic District; and the Col. Frank J. Hecker House (1888) and the Charles Lang Freer House (1887) in the East Ferry Avenue Historic District. Near the end of the 19th century, apartment living became more acceptable for affluent middle-class families, and upscale apartments, such as the Coronado Apartments (1894), the Verona Apartments (1894), the Palms Apartments (1903), the Davenport Apartments (1905) in the Cass-Davenport Historic District, and the Garden Court Apartments (1915) were constructed to meet the new demand.

These well-to-do late-19th-century residents also funded the construction of a spate of churches, such as the Cass Avenue Methodist Episcopal Church (1883), the First Presbyterian Church (1889), the Trinity Episcopal Church (1890) (built by James E. Scripps), and the First Unitarian Church (1890).

=== Immigration ===
Detroit has long been a city of immigrants, from the early French and English settlers in the 18th century, through the Irish who settled in the Corktown neighborhood in the 1840s, to the Greeks, who settled in the Greektown neighborhood in the early 20th century and the southern whites and African-Americans who came to Detroit in the years before the Great Depression. Detroit's industrial boom in the later 19th century created yet another stream of immigrants into Detroit. Perhaps the most significant contingents during this period were the German and Polish immigrants who settled in Detroit in the 1860–1890s. Germans came first, establishing German-speaking churches, primarily on the east side of the city, including Saint John's-St. Luke's Evangelical Church (1872), St. Joseph Catholic Church (1873), and Sacred Heart Church (1875), as well as social clubs such as the Harmonie Club (1894) and west-side churches such as St. Boniface (1882) and Gethsemane Evangelical Lutheran Church (1891). Close behind, a wave of Polish immigrants established east-side Roman Catholic parishes such as St. Albertus (1885), Sweetest Heart Of Mary (1893), St. Josaphat's (1901), St. Stanislaus (1911), and St. Thomas the Apostle Catholic Church (1923). The Poles also settled on the west side, founding West Side Dom Polski (1916).

=== Birth of the automobile ===
Around the start of the 20th century, entrepreneurs in the Detroit area—notably Henry Ford—forged into production of the automobile, capitalizing on the already-existing machine tool and coach-building industry in the city. Early automotive production is recognizable by structures such as the Ford Piquette Avenue Plant (1904) (a National Historic Landmark), and multiple structures in the surrounding Piquette Avenue Industrial Historic District (including the now-destroyed E-M-F/Studebaker Plant, 1906) and the New Amsterdam Historic District (including the original Cadillac factory, 1905) and small factories such as the Crescent Brass and Pin Company Building (1905).

Automobile assembly and associated manufacturing soon dominated Detroit, and the newly minted automotive magnates built commercial and office buildings such as General Motors Building (1919), the General Motors Research Laboratory (1928), and the Fisher Building (1928).

=== Changes wrought by the automobile ===
The development of the automobile industry led to rising demands for labor, which were filled by huge numbers of newcomers from Europe and the American South. Between 1900 and 1930, the city's population soared from 265,000 to over 1.5 million, pushing the boundaries of the city outward. The population boom led to the construction of apartment buildings across the city, aimed at the middle-class auto worker. These include the Somerset Apartments (1922), the Garden Court Apartments (1915), and the Manchester Apartments (1915).

At the same time, new upscale neighborhoods farther from the center of the city sprang up, including Boston-Edison, Indian Village, and Palmer Woods. The wealthy moved into these more exclusive neighborhoods as the once-exclusive Woodward Avenue neighborhoods (such as the Warren-Prentis Historic District and the Willis-Selden Historic District) became mixed with apartments and commercial buildings. As the population spread outwards, new churches were constructed to serve the newly populated areas, notably the Roman Catholic Cathedral of the Most Blessed Sacrament (1913), the Woodward Avenue Presbyterian Church (1908), the Metropolitan United Methodist Church (1922), and the St. Theresa of Avila Roman Catholic Church (1919).

The rise of the automobile also required rethinking transportation within the city. The Chestnut Street-Grand Trunk Railroad bridge (1929) was a result of a grade separation that unsnarled train and automobile traffic. The Fort Street-Pleasant Street and Norfolk & Western Railroad Viaduct (1928) was a product of the same program, routing trucking traffic over the train traffic. And the West Jefferson Avenue – Rouge River Bridge (1922) allowed the Rouge River to be expanded for barge traffic.

Automobile wealth led to a boom in downtown Detroit business, and the construction of a collection of early-20th-century skyscrapers. The most notable of these is the Art Deco National Historic Landmark Guardian Building (1928), but numerous other significant office buildings such as the Vinton Building (1916), the Barlum Tower (1927), and the Lawyers Building (1922) were also constructed. The building boom was not confined to businesses. Shopping districts sprang up along Park Avenue, Broadway, and Woodward. Multiple hotels were constructed, including the Fort Shelby Hotel (1916), the Detroit-Leland Hotel (1927), the Royal Palm Hotel (1924), and many others. Extravagant movie theaters such as the Fox (1928) and the Palms (1925) were constructed. And public buildings, such as Orchestra Hall (1919), the Detroit Public Library (1921), and the Detroit Institute of Arts (1923).

=== African-Americans ===
During the early years of Detroit, the African-American population was relatively small. However, the Second Baptist Church (1857; rebuilt 1914) was founded with an African-American congregation in the 1830s; the church played an instrumental role in the Underground Railroad, due to Detroit's proximity to Canada. The auto boom of the 20th century changed the population, and in the years following World War I, the black population of Detroit soared. In 1910, fewer than 6000 blacks called the city home; in 1917 more than 30,000 blacks lived in Detroit. Significant African-American structures in Detroit are related to the struggle with segregation: Dunbar Hospital (founded 1914), the Ossian H. Sweet House (1925), and the Sugar Hill neighborhood. However, other structures, such as the Breitmeyer-Tobin Building (1905) are tributes to the slow integration in the latter half of the 20th century.

=== Architecture ===
A number of notable architects worked in Detroit, including D. H. Burnham & Company; Donaldson and Meier; McKim, Mead, and White; Smith, Hinchman, and Grylls (and Wirt C. Rowland); and Minoru Yamasaki. However, Albert Kahn deserves special recognition for the scope and variety of his work in the city, and the number of Kahn-buildings listed in the National Register. Kahn designed large industrial buildings such as the Highland Park Ford Plant (1908) in nearby Highland Park (a National Historic Landmark), Fisher Body Plant 21 (1921) in the Piquette Avenue Industrial Historic District, and his addition to the Frederick Stearns Building (1906).

Kahn's output extended to a range of building types, notably office buildings such as the General Motors Building (1919) and the Fisher Building (1928) — both National Historic Landmarks — as well as the Edwin S. George Building (1908), the Vinton Building (1916), the S. S. Kresge World Headquarters (1928), the Griswold Building (1929), and a string of banks and highrises in the Detroit Financial District. Kahn also designed private homes (the Bernard Ginsburg House, 1898; the Albert Kahn House, 1906; and homes in Boston-Edison, Rosedale Park, and Indian Village), apartment and hotel buildings (the Palms Apartments, 1903; the Addison Hotel in the Midtown Woodward Historic District, 1905, Garden Court Apartments, 1915; and 1001 Covington in the Palmer Park Apartment Building Historic District, 1925), churches (the 1903 Temple Beth-El; the 1923 Temple Beth-El; and additions on the First Congregational Church, 1921), and theatres (the National Theatre, 1911).

== Current listings ==
=== Other neighborhoods ===
	Name on the Register	Image	Date listed	Location	Neighborhood	Description
1	Alden Park Towers	Alden Park Towers	October 9, 1985 (#85002933)	8100 E. Jefferson Ave. 42°21′05″N 82°59′40″W	Jefferson Corridor	The Alden Park Towers were built in 1922 south of Jefferson to take advantage of the natural beauty of the Detroit River. This structure is one of the few large apartment buildings constructed in Detroit.
2	Alger Theater	Alger Theater	July 22, 2005 (#05000719)	16451 E. Warren Ave. 42°24′13″N 82°56′14″W	East Side	The Art Moderne Alger Theater is one of only two remaining intact and unchanged neighborhood theaters in the city of Detroit (the second being the Redford Theatre). The theater is owned by Friends of the Alger Theater, a non profit organization dedicated to refurbishing and reopening the theater.
3	Amity Lodge No. 335 Temple — Spiritual Israel Church and Its Army Temple	Amity Lodge No. 335 Temple — Spiritual Israel Church and Its Army Temple	December 10, 2014 (#14001011)	9375 Amity St. 42°21′52″N 82°59′13″W	East Side	This building was constructed in 1911 for the Amity Lodge No. 335 of the Independent Order of Odd Fellows. It was used by Odd Fellow lodges and other fraternal organizations until 1960, when it became the headquarters of the Spiritual Israel Church and Its Army, a predominantly African American denomination.
4	Antietam Avenue Bridge	Antietam Avenue Bridge	February 18, 2000 (#00000114)	Antietam St. over the Grand Trunk Railroad line 42°20′43″N 83°02′05″W	Eastern Market Area	The Antietam Street bridge (along with the nearby Chestnut Street bridge) was built in the late 1920s and early 1930s as part of Detroit's program to separate railroad and street grades. It runs over what was once the Grand Trunk Railroad, and is now the Dequindre Cut. The bridge was demolished due to structural deficiencies.
5	Arden Park-East Boston Historic District	Arden Park-East Boston Historic District	April 29, 1982 (#82002891)	Arden Park and E. Boston Aves. between Woodward and Oakland Aves. 42°23′19″N 83°04′49″W	North End	The Arden Park-East Boston Historic District was platted in the 1890s east of Woodward in what was then the far northern reaches of Detroit. The neighborhood was platted with large lots to attract wealthier residents of Detroit; some of the neighborhood's first residents included Frederick Fisher, John Dodge, and J.L. Hudson. The neighborhood, along with nearby Boston-Edison (also on the register) remained a premier address for residential living in Detroit.
6	Assumption of the Blessed Virgin Mary Church	Assumption of the Blessed Virgin Mary Church	August 5, 1991 (#91001020)	13770 Gratiot Ave. 42°25′40″N 82°58′52″W	East Side	This Roman Catholic parish was started in 1830 by German immigrants. The church is known as the Assumption Grotto Church, due to the popularity of the grotto, completed in 1881, which was built as a replica of the Sanctuary of Our Lady of Lourdes in France. The church complex includes the grotto, a 1929 church, a rectory, convent, and cemetery.
7	Edmund Atkinson School	Edmund Atkinson School	December 12, 2011 (#10000635)	4900 E. Hildale St. 42°25′44″N 83°03′15″W	East Side	The Edmund Atkinson School was built as an elementary school in 1927. Detroit Public Schools closed the building in 2007, and in 2010 sold it to National Heritage Academy for $600,000. The building has reopened as Legacy Charter Academy.
8	John N. Bagley House	John N. Bagley House	October 9, 1985 (#85002934)	2921 E. Jefferson Ave. 42°20′27″N 83°01′03″W	Jefferson Corridor	This two-and-one-half-story structure is still one of the finest of Detroit's Richardsonian Romanesque houses. Built of dark brick and brown stone, it has a massive gable roof and a tower with conical roof. The facade contains multiple surface and window treatments, including sculptural elements by Julius Melchers around the entrance.
9	Bagley-West Vernor Historic District	Bagley-West Vernor Historic District	January 22, 2026 (#100012599)	Generally, 2443-3500 Bagley St. and 1753-4750 W. Vernor; 42°19′23″N 83°05′16″W	Southwest Detroit	Detroit’s Latinx Communities MPS
10	Belle Isle	Belle Isle	February 25, 1974 (#74000999)	Detroit River; 42°20′32″N 82°58′46″W	Jefferson Corridor	Belle Isle is a 982-acre (3.97 km^{2}) island park in the Detroit River, home to the Anna Scripps Whitcomb Conservatory, the Detroit Yacht Club, the Detroit Boat Club, the Dossin Great Lakes Museum, a Coast Guard post, and a municipal golf course. It is the largest island park in the United States.
11	Birwood Wall	Birwood Wall	January 27, 2021 (#100006100)	Along the alleyway between Birwood Ave. and Mendota St. from Eight Mile Rd. to Pembroke Ave; 42°26′32″N 83°09′58″W	West Side	The Birwood Wall is a six-foot-high (1.8 m) separation wall that was constructed in 1941 to physically separate Black and White homeowners on the sole basis of race.
12	Boston-Edison Historic District	Boston-Edison Historic District	September 5, 1975 (#75000965)	Roughly bounded by Edison St., Woodward and Linwood Aves. and Glynn Ct. 42°22′54″N 83°05′50″W	North End	The Boston-Edison Historic District is a historic neighborhood consisting of over 900 homes. Historically significant residents include Henry Ford, James Couzens, Horace Rackham, Peter E. Martin, C. Harold Wills, Clarence W. Avery, Sebastian S. Kresge, and Clarence Burton. It is one of the largest residential historic districts in the nation.
13	Luther Burbank Elementary School		March 15, 2022 (#100007521)	15600 East State Fair Ave. 42°26′33″N 82°57′34″W	Palmer Park Area	Part of the Public Schools of Detroit MPS.
14	Joseph Campau House	Joseph Campau House	October 9, 1985 (#85002935)	2910 E. Jefferson Ave. 42°20′23″N 83°01′07″W	Jefferson Corridor	The Joseph Campau House, built on land that was originally part of the Joseph Campau farm, is one of the oldest residences in Detroit. The house is a simply constructed two-story house with a symmetrical three-bay facade.
15	Cathedral of the Most Blessed Sacrament	Cathedral of the Most Blessed Sacrament	August 3, 1982 (#82002894)	9844-9854 Woodward Ave. 42°23′18″N 83°05′06″W	North End	The Cathedral of the Most Blessed Sacrament is the home of the Archdiocese of Detroit since its inception in 1938. Construction of the church started in 1913, but proceeded rather slowly. The interior was finished in 1930, and the exterior was not finished until 1951 with the construction of the towers.
16	Central Woodward Christian Church	Central Woodward Christian Church	August 3, 1982 (#82002896)	9000 Woodward Ave. 42°22′54″N 83°04′50″W	North End	This church was built by the Disciples of Christ in Detroit, in the mid-1920s as their second church in Detroit. In the 1970s, the congregation migrated into the suburbs, and the church was sold to the Little Rock Missionary Baptist Church.
17	Checker Cab Taxi Garage and Office Building	Checker Cab Taxi Garage and Office Building	July 24, 2019 (#100004226)	2128 Trumbull Ave. 42°19′57″N 83°04′03″W	Corktown-Woodbridge	In 1927, the Detroit Cab Company constructed this new, three-story flat-roofed garage and office building. In 1929, the Checker Cab Company purchased Detroit Cab, and by `931 had moved its own headquarters to the building. Checker remained in the building on Trumbull until 2016, when it sold the building for redevelopment into loft space.
18	Alexander Chene House	Alexander Chene House	October 9, 1985 (#85002936)	2681 E. Jefferson Ave. 42°20′21″N 83°01′17″W	Jefferson Corridor	The Chene House was one of the few examples of Federal architecture in Detroit. It was built in 1850 by Alexander Chene on land which had been granted to the Chene family by Louis XIV of France in 1707. The home was demolished in April 1991; an IHOP was built in its place.
19	Chestnut Street-Grand Trunk Railroad	Chestnut Street-Grand Trunk Railroad	February 18, 2000 (#00000115)	Chestnut St. over Grand Trunk Railroad; 42°20′41″N 83°02′03″W	Eastern Market Area	The Chestnut Street bridge (along with the nearby Antietam Street bridge) was built in the late 1920s/early 1930s as part of Detroit's program to separate railroad and street grades. It runs over what was once the Grand Trunk Railroad, and is now the Dequindre Cut.
20	Christ Church, Detroit	Christ Church, Detroit	March 11, 1971 (#71000423)	960 E. Jefferson Ave. 42°19′57″N 83°02′05″W	Jefferson Corridor	This Episcopalian church, constructed in 1863, is the oldest Protestant church in Michigan which is still located on its original site. The church is built in an American Gothic style, using limestone and sandstone; a massive belfry with a squared-off Germanic roof dominates the front facade. All interior woodwork, save the roof, is made from local butternut. There are two Tiffany windows in the church, with more windows designed by other famous glass companies.
21	Church of the Transfiguration Historic District	Church of the Transfiguration Historic District	September 16, 2019 (#100004383)	5830 Simon K 42°24′53″N 83°02′38″W	East Side	This Historic District is a group of buildings associated with what was the Church of the Transfiguration Roman Catholic parish (and is now the Saint John Paul II parish). It includes the church itself, a shrine (with grotto), school, convent, rectory and activities building. They are all located near each other in a one-and-half-block area. The buildings were constructed over the period 1925 - 1961.
22	Elizabeth Cleveland Intermediate School	Elizabeth Cleveland Intermediate School	October 5, 2015 (#15000702)	13322 Conant St. 42°24′44″N 83°03′29″W	East Side	This school, designed by Donaldson and Meier, is an excellent example of Collegiate Gothic style, with no alteration to its exterior since its construction in 1927. The building was used as a Detroit Public School until 2009, and now houses the Frontier International Academy.
23	Thomas M. Cooley High School	Thomas M. Cooley High School	December 12, 2011 (#10000651)	15055 Hubbell St. 42°24′02″N 83°11′28″W	West Side	This three-story, Mediterranean Revival school, named for Michigan Supreme Court chief justice Thomas M. Cooley opened in 1928. It was closed in 2010.
24	Corktown Historic District	Corktown Historic District	July 31, 1978 (#78001517)	Roughly bounded by Lodge Freeway, Porter, Trumbull, Bagley, Rosa Parks Boulevard, and Michigan Ave. 42°19′46″N 83°04′27″W	Corktown – Woodbridge	Corktown is the oldest surviving neighborhood in Detroit, dating to the 1850s. The name comes from the Irish immigrants who settled there; they were predominantly from County Cork. The neighborhood is primarily residential, but the district does include some commercial buildings, mostly along Michigan Avenue.
25	Crescent Brass and Pin Company Building	Crescent Brass and Pin Company Building	March 3, 2003 (#03000067)	5766 Trumbull Ave. 42°21′32″N 83°04′56″W	West Side	This building was originally constructed in 1905 for a firm that made radiator chaplets, and was enlarged in several stages in 1916, 1917, 1924, and the early 1950s. The company ceased operations in Detroit in the 1980s. The building has been refurbished into lofts, and is now known as the Research Lofts on Trumbull.
26	Croul-Palms House	Croul-Palms House	December 20, 1983 (#83003790)	1394 E. Jefferson Ave. 42°20′01″N 83°01′55″W	Jefferson Corridor	The Croul-Palms House is named after its first two owners, Jerome Croul and Francis Palms. The house is an excellent example of Queen Anne architecture.
27	Edwin Denby High School	Edwin Denby High School	February 2, 2005 (#04001581)	12800 Kelly Rd. 42°25′33″N 82°57′26″W	East Side	Denby High School is named after Edwin C. Denby, an attorney, former Michigan legislator and Secretary of the Navy during the administration of Warren G. Harding. The Art Deco building features nautical themes.
28	Detroit Naval Armory	Detroit Naval Armory	July 1, 1994 (#94000662)	7600 E. Jefferson Ave. 42°20′55″N 82°59′51″W	Jefferson Corridor	The Detroit Naval Armory, also known as the R. Thornton Brodhead Armory, was constructed as a training facility for the Michigan "naval militias", the forerunner of present-day Navy and Marine Corps Reserve units. During the Great Depression, the Works Progress Administration funded numerous artistic additions to the armory; this collection of WPA art is the largest collection of federally funded Depression-era artwork of any building in the state.
29	Detroit Savings Bank Southwest Branch	Detroit Savings Bank Southwest Branch	April 16, 2021 (#100006411)	5705 West Fort St. 42°18′32″N 83°05′52″W	Southwest Detroit	Part of the Branch Banks in Detroit, Michigan, 1889-1970 MPS
30	Detroit Yacht Club	Detroit Yacht Club	May 25, 2011 (#11000309)	1 Riverbank Rd., Belle Isle; 42°20′56″N 82°58′25″W	Jefferson Corridor	The Detroit Yacht Club is the largest yacht club in the United States. Its clubhouse was designed by architect George Mason in a Mediterranean Revival style.
31	Duane Doty School	Duane Doty School	December 12, 2011 (#10000654)	10225 3rd St. 42°23′12″N 83°05′33″W	North End	The Duane Doty School, built in 1908, was named after a former Superintendent of Schools for Detroit.
32	Dry Dock Engine Works-Detroit Dry Dock Company Complex	Dry Dock Engine Works-Detroit Dry Dock Company Complex	September 3, 2009 (#09000680)	1801–1803 and 1900 Atwater St. 42°19′59″N 83°01′37″W	Jefferson Corridor	The complex includes a cluster of six buildings (also known as the Globe Trading Company Building) and a dry dock along the river; these structures are the remnants of a once-thriving maritime construction trade. The machine shop is significant as an early industrial building with structural steel frame and curtain walls.
33	East Grand Boulevard Historic District	East Grand Boulevard Historic District	November 30, 1999 (#99001468)	E. Grand Boulevard, between E. Jefferson Ave. and Mack Ave. 42°21′12″N 83°00′22″W	Jefferson Corridor	The East Grand Boulevard Historic District includes a few moderate-sized apartment buildings and numerous large homes constructed primarily between 1900 and 1925. The apartment buildings in the district include the El Tovar Apartments, Saint Paul Manor Apartments, and the Kingston Arms Apartments.
34	Eastern Market Historic District	Eastern Market Historic District	November 29, 1978 (#78001518)	Bounded by Gratiot Ave., Riopelle, Rivard, and Division Sts.; also roughly bounded by Gratiot Ave., Riopelle St., Wilkins St., the Grand Trunk Railroad line, and Division St. 42°20′44″N 83°02′22″W	Eastern Market Area	Eastern market, established in the 1850s, is the largest historic public market district in the United States. The district houses food wholesaling and processing businesses as well as public market sheds. The second set of boundaries represents an increase added on 2007-02-01.
35	Eastside Historic Cemetery District	Eastside Historic Cemetery District	December 2, 1982 (#82000550)	Bounded by Elmwood and Mt. Elliot Aves., Lafayette and Waterloo Sts. 42°20′59″N 83°01′05″W	Jefferson Corridor	The Eastside Historic Cemetery District consists of three separate cemeteries: Mount Elliott Cemetery (Catholic, established 1841), Elmwood Cemetery (Protestant, established 1846), and the Lafayette Street Cemetery (Jewish, established 1850), spreading over 150 acres (0.61 km^{2}) in total. The cemeteries are notable for the monuments, landscaping, and notable individuals interred there.
36	Edson, Moore and Company Building	Edson, Moore and Company Building	November 27, 2017 (#100001839)	1702 W Fort St. 42°19′25″N 83°03′56″W	Corktown – Woodbridge	This building was constructed in 1912 for Edson, Moore & Company, a wholesale dry goods firm, as warehouse space. The company used the building until 1958.The building has been redeveloped into a mixed use space known as The Assembly Apartments.
37	Eighth Precinct Police Station	Eighth Precinct Police Station	December 31, 1974 (#74001001)	4150 Grand River; 42°20′42″N 83°04′46″W	Corktown – Woodbridge	The Eighth Precinct Police Station is the second-oldest police building in Detroit. The station is made up of two, two-story structures with a single-story arcade between. The main building was used as office space while the other building was used as a garage. The building currently houses Phoenix Group Consultants.
38	El Tovar Apartments	El Tovar Apartments	February 28, 1991 (#91000214)	320 E. Grand Boulevard; 42°21′12″N 83°00′20″W	Jefferson Corridor	The 73-apartment El Tovar Apartment building is an excellent example of Spanish Moorish/Art Deco style. It is located within the East Grand Boulevard Historic District.
39	Engine House No. 11	Engine House No. 11	January 9, 1978 (#78001519)	2737 Gratiot Ave. 42°21′16″N 83°01′53″W	East Side	Engine House No. 11 is the oldest remaining fire house in the city of Detroit. It was organized in 1884 with horse-drawn equipment, and converted to motorized equipment in 1911. The building was used as a fire house until 1972.
40	Engine House No. 18	Engine House No. 18	November 29, 1995 (#95001368)	3812 Mt. Elliott Ave. 42°21′47″N 83°01′21″W	East Side	Engine House No. 18 is the third oldest existing (and the oldest operating) fire station in Detroit. It was built in 1892 with two first-floor engine bays.
41	First Baptist Church of Detroit	First Baptist Church of Detroit	August 3, 1982 (#82002898)	8601 Woodward Ave. 42°22′44″N 83°04′47″W	North End	The First Baptist Church congregation was founded in 1827. This building was constructed in 1910 as congregants moved out of the downtown area. In 1957, with the congregation again on the move, First Baptist sold the building to the Peoples Community Church, who remain in the building.
42	Fisher and New Center Buildings	Fisher and New Center Buildings	October 14, 1980 (#80001922)	7430 2nd Ave. and 3011 W. Grand Boulevard; 42°22′11″N 83°04′39″W	New Center Area	The Fisher and New Center Buildings as a pair are an architecturally significant complex demonstrating some of the finest craftsmanship and artistry in Art Deco–style buildings. Both were funded by the Fisher brothers (of Fisher Body) and designed by Albert Kahn. The New Center building is now known as the Albert Kahn Building.
43	Fisher Building	Fisher Building	June 29, 1989 (#07000847)	3011 West Grand Boulevard; 42°22′09″N 83°04′37″W	New Center Area	Built in 1927 by the Fisher brothers, this skyscraper is one of the greatest works by architect Albert Kahn. The Fishers spent lavishly to make this Art Deco masterpiece a monumental gift to Detroit and one of the most finely detailed major commercial buildings in the United States.
44	Henry Ford Hospital	Henry Ford Hospital	September 4, 2013 (#13000671)	2799 West Grand Boulevard; 42°22′02″N 83°05′03″W	West Side	Henry Ford Hospital was opened in 1915 primarily through the efforts of Henry Ford. The main hospital dates from 1917.
45	Ford Piquette Avenue Plant	Ford Piquette Avenue Plant	February 22, 2002 (#02000041)	461 Piquette Ave. 42°22′07″N 83°03′56″W	New Center Area	The Ford Piquette Avenue Plant is a New England mill-style building, built by the Ford Motor Company in 1904. The building is where the Model T was designed and first built. Ford moved out in 1910, selling the building to Studebaker the following year. It is currently operated as a museum, the Model T Automotive Heritage Complex.
46	Fort Wayne	Fort Wayne	May 6, 1971 (#71000425)	6053 W. Jefferson Ave. 42°17′49″N 83°05′45″W	Southwest Detroit	Fort Wayne is Detroit's third fort, after Fort Detroit and Fort Lernoult. The original star fort and barracks at Fort Wayne was constructed in 1845-48. It served as a mustering center and garrison post from the Civil War though the Vietnam War. Later buildings were added outside the star fort, including officer's homes, a guard post, hospital, additional barracks, and other buildings.
47	Garden Court Apartments	Garden Court Apartments	October 9, 1985 (#85002937)	2900 E. Jefferson Ave. 42°20′22″N 83°01′09″W	Jefferson Corridor	The Garden Court Apartments were constructed for J. Harrington Walker (of Hiram Walker & Sons) in 1915. Walker lived across the street from the Garden Court; when the building was completed, he moved into one of the apartments. The nine-story building originally housed 32 very large luxury apartments.
48	James A. Garfield School	James A. Garfield School	January 26, 1984 (#84001857)	840 Waterman St. 42°18′23″N 83°06′33″W	Southwest Detroit	The James A. Garfield School is one of the oldest existing schools in the city of Detroit, as well as one of the least altered. The school, named for president James A. Garfield, was designed in 1896; in 1907, the name of the building was changed to honor Frank H. Beard, the director of the Springwells school board for 17 years.
49	General Motors Building	General Motors Building	June 2, 1978 (#78001520)	3044 W. Grand Boulevard; 42°22′07″N 83°04′32″W	New Center Area	The 15-story General Motors Building was designed in 1919 by Albert Kahn, and used until 1996 as the headquarters of General Motors Corporation. The building, currently known as Cadillac Place, is now leased by the State of Michigan.
50	General Motors Research Laboratory	General Motors Research Laboratory	July 22, 2005 (#05000713)	485-495 Milwaukee; 42°22′05″N 83°04′30″W	New Center Area	This building, designed by Albert Kahn, was a former laboratory building for General Motors, which operated from the General Motors Building across West Milwaukee Street. General Motors recently donated it to Detroit's College for Creative Studies. The building is also known as the Argonaut Building.
51	Gethsemane Evangelical Lutheran Church	Gethsemane Evangelical Lutheran Church	April 22, 1982 (#82002900)	4461 28th St. 42°20′16″N 83°06′36″W	West Side	The Gethsemane Lutheran Church is a wooden, High Victorian Gothic chapel, built in 1891 by the Zion Evangelical Lutheran Church. The congregation used the building until 1976, when they went defunct. The building was purchased by the Motor City Missionary Baptist Church in 1978.
52	Grande Ballroom	Grande Ballroom	December 10, 2018 (#100003226)	8952 Grand River Ave. 42°21′53″N 83°07′42″W	West Side	The Grande Ballroom is a historic live music venue, designed by Detroit architect Charles N. Agree in 1928. In 1966 the Grande was acquired by local radio DJ Russ Gibb as a venue for the new psychedelic music and a resource for local teenagers.
53	Greenfield Union School	Greenfield Union School	March 29, 2011 (#10000662)	420 W. 7 Mile Rd. 42°25′57″N 83°06′28″W	Palmer Park Area	The Greenfield Union School was built for $40,000 in 1914 in what was then Greenfield Township. In 1916, the area was annexed by the city of Detroit. The school was nominated to the NRHP as part of the Public Schools of Detroit MPS.
54	Frances Harper Inn	Frances Harper Inn	July 20, 2023 (#100009149)	307 Horton St. 42°22′22″N 83°04′11″W	New Center Area	
55	Hibbard Apartment Building	Hibbard Apartment Building	October 9, 1985 (#85002938)	8905 E. Jefferson Ave. 42°21′26″N 82°59′14″W	Jefferson Corridor	The Hibbard Apartment Building is a nine-story structure with 40 units, designed in a handsome Renaissance Revival style by Robert O. Derrick, who also designed the National Historic Landmark Henry Ford Museum in Dearborn, Michigan.
56	William E. Higginbotham Elementary School	William E. Higginbotham Elementary School	December 9, 2022 (#100008470)	8730 Chippewa Ave. 42°26′28″N 83°09′31″W	West Side	
57	Samuel D. Holcomb School		July 21, 2023 (#100009147)	18100 Bentler St. 42°25′17″N 83°15′10″W	West Side	
58	Hook and Ladder House No. 5-Detroit Fire Department Repair Shop	Hook and Ladder House No. 5-Detroit Fire Department Repair Shop	December 1, 1997 (#97001481)	3400-3434 Russell; 42°21′04″N 83°02′35″W	Eastern Market Area	The Hook and Ladder House No. 5 and the Detroit Fire Department Repair Shop are two conjoined structures originally built for the Detroit Fire Department. The Hook and Ladder House was built in 1888, the Repair Shop in 1917. The two are now the Sala Thai Restaurant and the FD Lofts.
59	Hunter House	Hunter House	December 31, 1974 (#74001002)	3985 Trumbull Ave. 42°20′43″N 83°04′30″W	Corktown – Woodbridge	In 1890, William Northwood, the co-founder of the Howard–Northwood Malt Manufacturing Company, commissioned architect George F. Depew to design this home. The structure was completed in 1891 at a cost of $13,500. In the 1960s, the house was converted into a church. In the early 1970s, the home was purchased by the Hunter family, who converted it back to a private residence. This house is also known as the Northwood House or the Northwood–Hunter House. It is currently operated as the Woodbridge Star, a bed and breakfast.
60	Hurlbut Memorial Gate	Hurlbut Memorial Gate	March 27, 1975 (#75000967)	E. Jefferson at Cadillac Boulevard; 42°21′39″N 82°58′53″W	Jefferson Corridor	Hurlbut Memorial Gate, named for Detroit grocer and Water Commissioner Chauncey Hurlbut (1803–1885), marks the entrance to Waterworks Park, the main site of Detroit's municipal water system. The gate is a handsome limestone Beaux Arts design.
61	Immaculata High School	Immaculata High School	August 1, 2023 (#100008529)	16661 Greenlawn Avenue; 42°24′51″N 83°09′05″W	West Side	
62	Indian Village Historic District	Indian Village Historic District	March 24, 1972 (#72000667)	Bounded by Mack, Burns, Jefferson, and Seminole Aves. 42°21′40″N 82°59′48″W	Jefferson Corridor	Indian Village has a number of architecturally significant homes built in the early 20th century. Many of the homes were built by prominent architects such as Albert Kahn, Louis Kamper and William Stratton for some of the area's most prominent citizens such as Edsel Ford.
63	Jefferson-Chalmers Historic Business District	Jefferson-Chalmers Historic Business District	June 16, 2004 (#04000598)	E. Jefferson between Eastlawn and Alter; 42°22′26″N 82°56′34″W	Jefferson Corridor	The Historic Jefferson-Chalmers Business District, running eight blocks along Jefferson Avenue, is one of a few early 20th-century neighborhood commercial districts that still survive in Detroit.
64	The Kean	The Kean	October 9, 1985 (#85002940)	8925 E. Jefferson Ave. 42°21′27″N 82°59′12″W	Jefferson Corridor	The Kean is a strikingly Art Deco apartment building designed by Charles Noble in 1931. The building is sixteen stories high, containing four apartments per floor. It was the last of the large apartment building built along East Jefferson before the Great Depression depressed development.
65	Kingston Arms Apartments	Kingston Arms Apartments	April 9, 1999 (#99000433)	296 E. Grand Boulevard; 42°21′16″N 83°00′28″W	Jefferson Corridor	The Kingston Arms is a 4 1/2-story apartment building with 24 apartments, and is a representative example of the rise of middle-class apartment buildings in pre-Depression era Detroit. It is located in the East Grand Boulevard Historic District.
66	Lee Plaza Hotel	Lee Plaza Hotel	November 5, 1981 (#81000319)	2240 W. Grand Boulevard; 42°21′34″N 83°06′06″W	West Side	First built as an ornate high rise hotel along West Grand Boulevard, Lee Plaza was an upscale apartment with hotel services. Decorated with sculpture and tile outside, the structure rivaled the Book-Cadillac Hotel and Statler Hotel for architectural notice in Detroit during the 1920s. The structure is currently vacant.
67	Nellie Leland School	Nellie Leland School	February 14, 2002 (#02000044)	1395 Antietam St. 42°20′28″N 83°02′15″W	Eastern Market Area	The Nellie Leland School is a school building, originally built to serve handicapped children. It is named after the wife of Henry M. Leland, a Detroit automotive pioneer who founded both the Cadillac and Lincoln automotive companies and a philanthropist who focused on helping those sick with tuberculosis.
68	Manchester Apartments	Manchester Apartments	October 9, 1985 (#85002941)	2016 E. Jefferson Ave. 42°20′10″N 83°01′37″W	Jefferson Corridor	The Manchester Apartments is typical of medium-scale middle-class apartment buildings built in Detroit in general and along East Jefferson in particular in the first decade of the 20th century. The details of the exterior, including corner blocks around window groupings, brick quoins, and patterns above the cornice demonstrate the rise of modernism.
69	Marwood Apartments	Marwood Apartments	May 16, 2019 (#100003937)	53 Marston St. 42°22′31″N 83°04′31″W	New Center Area	In 1925, developer Emil C. Pokorny of Pokorny & Company hired local architect Harvey J. Haughey to design this building, one of five Porknoy developed in Detroit. The building is a U-shaped four-and-a-half-story, Neoclassical multi-tone red brick building. The apartments were rented as fully furnished units, and were marketed to professionals and white-collar workers.
70	Marygrove College	Marygrove College	July 11, 2022 (#100007930)	8425 West McNichols Rd. 42°24′56″N 83°09′21″W		
71	Metropolitan United Methodist Church	Metropolitan United Methodist Church	August 3, 1982 (#82002904)	8000 Woodward Ave. 42°22′29″N 83°04′32″W	New Center Area	The Metropolitan United Methodist Church congregation was founded in 1901 with the merger of two earlier congregations. The church building was constructed in 1922 on land donated by one of the congregants, Sebastian S. Kresge. By the mid-1930s, the congregation was the largest local church in the Methodist world.
72	Michigan Avenue Historic Commercial District	Michigan Avenue Historic Commercial District	April 8, 2020 (#100005169)	South side of 3301-3461 Michigan Ave. 42°19′53″N 83°05′24″W	Southwest Detroit	This district contains 13 contributing commercial buildings, constricted from the 1880s through the 1920s. This represents the most intact section collections of buildings along this stretch of Michigan Avenue.
73	Michigan Bell and Western Electric Warehouse	Michigan Bell and Western Electric Warehouse	December 8, 2009 (#09001069)	882 Oakman Boulevard; 42°24′10″N 83°06′48″W	North End	This structure was built in 1929-30 as a warehouse, garage, and office space for Western Electric. Western Electric used the building as its Michigan headquarters until 1958, after which it was used by Michigan Bell and its Yellow Pages operation until 1999.
74	Michigan State Fair Riding Coliseum, Dairy Cattle Building, and Agricultural Building	Michigan State Fair Riding Coliseum, Dairy Cattle Building, and Agricultural Building	June 6, 1980 (#80001925)	Michigan State Fairgrounds; 42°26′36″N 83°07′03″W	Palmer Park Area	The Michigan State Fair Riding Coliseum, Dairy Cattle Building, and Agricultural Building are three buildings located on the grounds of the Michigan State Fair. They were built two years apart in 1922, 1924, and 1926. All three are similar in appearance, being Neo-Classical Revival, white stuccoed buildings sitting on high red brick foundations.
75	Mies van der Rohe Residential District, Lafayette Park	Mies van der Rohe Residential District, Lafayette Park	August 1, 1996 (#96000809)	Roughly bounded by Lafayette Ave., Rivard, Antietam, and Orleans Sts. 42°20′31″N 83°02′08″W	Jefferson Corridor	This 78-acre (320,000 m^{2}) urban renewal project was planned by Mies van der Rohe, Ludwig Hilberseimer and Alfred Caldwell. It is the largest collection of his work in the world, centered around a landscaped, 19-acre (7.7 ha) park with no through traffic, in which these and other low-rise apartment buildings are sited. The apartment buildings are classic examples of Mies' International Style, with their simplicity, clean proportions, and cladding of tinted glass and aluminum.
76	Orsel and Minnie McGhee House	Orsel and Minnie McGhee House	August 16, 2022 (#100008009)	4626 Seebaldt St. 42°21′19″N 83°07′10″W	West Side	
77	Sidney D. Miller Junior High and High School	Sidney D. Miller Junior High and High School	December 12, 2011 (#10000689)	2322 DuBois St. 42°20′54″N 83°01′54″W	East Side	Miller Middle School opened in 1921 as a Junior High. However, as the percentage of African-Americans in the Black Bottom neighborhood increased, white parents of students at nearby Eastern High School complained. In response the Detroit School Board converted Miller to a senior high school in 1933. A liberal school transfer policy allowed White students zoned to Miller to attend Eastern, which effectively segregated students, leaving Miller as the de facto African-American High school. In 1955, steps were taken to end segregation in Detroit schools, and in 1957 the building was converted back into a middle school. It remained a middle school for 50 years, and was closed in 2007.
78	Millwood Apartments	Millwood Apartments	August 21, 2024 (#100010751)	36 East Milwaukee St. 42°22′09″N 83°04′18″W	New Center Area	Part of the Apartment Buildings in Detroit, Michigan, 1892-1970 MPS
79	Most Worshipful Prince Hall Grand Lodge of Michigan	Most Worshipful Prince Hall Grand Lodge of Michigan	January 19, 2022 (#100007344)	3500 McDougall St. 42°21′26″N 83°01′43″W	East Side	Part of The Civil Rights Movement and the African American Experience in 20th Century Detroit MPS
80	Moross House	Moross House	January 13, 1972 (#72000669)	1460 E. Jefferson Ave. 42°20′05″N 83°01′53″W	Jefferson Corridor	The Moross House was built in the 1840s by brickmaker Christopher Moross; it was one of two built by Moross on the site. It is the oldest surviving brick house in the city.
81	Nacirema Club	Nacirema Club	November 30, 2011 (#11000867)	6118 30th St. 42°20′59″N 83°06′58″W	West Side	The Nacirema Club, founded in 1922, is the first African-American social club in Michigan. During its heyday, this men's club was the social center of the surrounding neighborhood. The name is "American" spelled backwards.
82	New Amsterdam Historic District	New Amsterdam Historic District	May 30, 2001 (#01000570)	435, 450 Amsterdam;440, 41-47 Burroughs; 5911-5919, 6050-6160 Cass; 6100-6200 Second; 425 York; 42°21′56″N 83°04′21″W	New Center Area	The New Amsterdam Historic District contains a mix of industrial, commercial, and government/utility buildings constructed primarily near the start of the 20th century. Industry in the district was enabled by the construction of major railroad infrastructure, known as the Milwaukee Junction, in the 1890s. The district includes the original Cadillac assembly plant.
83	New Bethel Baptist Church	New Bethel Baptist Church	February 8, 2021 (#100006130)	8430 Linwood St. 42°22′05″N 83°06′17″W	West Side	The New Bethel Baptist Church was founded in 1932, and led by the Reverend C. L. Franklin from 1946 until 1979. In 1963, the church moved to its current location, the former Oriole Theater building. The church and this building was at the center of the Civil Rights Movement in Detroit.
84	New Center Commercial Historic District	New Center Commercial Historic District	May 3, 2016 (#16000218)	Woodward Ave.-Baltimore St. to Grand Blvd. 42°22′10″N 83°04′22″W	New Center Area	This district contains fourteen contributing structures, built the late 1880s to 1942. The structures are one to three-story commercial masonry buildings, constructed in a range of architectural styles, including Commercial style, Neoclassical, Art Deco and Moderne. The district is representative of many of the local commercial districts in Detroit which sprang up at the intersections of major streets. However, the New Center area has retained more commercial vitality than many other neighborhood commercial districts, and the buildings within the district maintain a higher degree of integrity.
85	Philetus W. Norris House	Philetus W. Norris House	January 28, 1992 (#91001982)	17815 Mt. Elliott Ave. 42°25′30″N 83°02′19″W	East Side	The Philetus W. Norris House was built in 1873 by Philetus W. Norris, who went on to become the second superintendent of Yellowstone National Park. Norris founded the town of "Norris" (later "North Detroit") and built his house there. The town was later subsumed into the city of Detroit; Norris's house is one of the few original structures left in the area.
86	North Woodward Congregational Church	North Woodward Congregational Church	August 3, 1982 (#82002905)	8715 Woodward Ave. 42°22′47″N 83°04′49″W	North End	The North Woodward Congregational Church was built in stages, with a small chapel on the site of the present church constructed as early as 1907; the main sanctuary was built in 1911–1912 and additional sections were added later, with the most recent, the church house, being added in 1929. By the 1950s, the congregation had substantially moved out of Detroit, and the building was sold to St. John's Christian Methodist Episcopal Church.
87	Palmer Park Apartment Building Historic District	Palmer Park Apartment Building Historic District	May 21, 1983 (#83000895)	Roughly bounded by Pontchartrain Boulevard, McNichols Rd. and Covington Dr.; also approximately bounded by Covington Dr., Pontchartrain Boulevard, Woodward Ave., and W. McNichols Rd. 42°25′11″N 83°06′37″W	Palmer Park Area	The land that this historic district sits on was once the estate of Thomas W. Palmer. In 1925, Walter Briggs hired Albert Kahn to design an apartment building at 1001 Covington. Forty buildings total were constructed in the district by multiple architects, including Weidmaier and Gay, Robert West, and William Kapp. The second set of boundaries is from the boundary increase of February 11, 2005.
88	Palmer Woods Historic District	Palmer Woods Historic District	August 11, 1983 (#83000896)	Roughly bounded by Seven Mile Rd., Woodward Ave., and Strathcona Dr. 42°26′05″N 83°07′28″W	Palmer Park Area	Palmer Woods sits on land originally owned by Thomas W. Palmer, a prominent citizen of 19th-century Detroit and a United States Senator. The neighborhood was platted in the mid-1910s, and most of the homes were constructed between about 1917 and 1929. Landscape architect Ossian Cole Simonds laid out a subdivision with gently curving streets, capitalizing on the natural beauty of the area and creating a parklike atmosphere in the neighborhood.
89	The Palms	The Palms	October 9, 1985 (#85002942)	1001 E. Jefferson Ave. 42°20′00″N 83°02′04″W	Jefferson Corridor	The Palms was one of the first buildings in the US to use reinforced concrete as one of its major construction materials. The building was named after Francis Palms, a major investor, who lived close by (in the Croul-Palms House). The original floor plans called for apartments that occupied an entire wing of the building, consisting of a double parlor in the front and a dining room with fireplace to the back separated by bedrooms, libraries, baths and more.
90	Parke-Davis and Company Pharmaceutical Company Plant	Parke-Davis and Company Pharmaceutical Company Plant	September 16, 1985 (#85002445)	Bounded by Joseph Campau Ave., Wight St., and McDougal Ave. 42°20′13″N 83°00′59″W	Jefferson Corridor	In the 1870s, Parke-Davis moved to the riverfront property this complex now occupies. Between 1891 and 1955, the company expanded the complex to cover over 14 acres (57,000 m^{2}), building the 26 buildings that still stand (including the National Historic Landmark Parke-Davis Research Laboratory). These buildings range from brick mill buildings built around the start of the 20th century to reinforced concrete buildings constructed after 1920 and range from one to six stories in height.
91	Parke-Davis Research Laboratory	Parke-Davis Research Laboratory	May 11, 1976 (#76001039)	Joseph Campau St. at Detroit River; 42°20′13″N 83°00′52″W	Jefferson Corridor	Built in 1902, this was the first industrial research laboratory in the U.S. established for the specific purpose of conducting pharmacological research, inaugurating the commercial pure science approach which has driven the rapid development of pharmaceutical products. Now known as the Omni Detroit Hotel at River Place.
92	Arthur M. Parker House	Arthur M. Parker House	October 9, 1985 (#85002943)	8115 E. Jefferson Ave. 42°21′10″N 82°59′36″W	Jefferson Corridor	The Arthur M. Parker House is a two-and-one-half-story house, faced with brick on the first story and stucco and half-timbering above. The house has a medieval character reinforced by irregular bays, though more restrained than the next-door Frederick K. Stearns House.
93	Thomas A. Parker House	Thomas A. Parker House	November 12, 1982 (#82000552)	975 E. Jefferson Ave. 42°19′59″N 83°02′06″W	Jefferson Corridor	Thomas Parker was a grocer and real estate speculator who commissioned Gorden W. Lloyd in 1868 to build what is now a rare example of a Gothic Revival house in Detroit.
94	Rosa L. (McCauley) and Raymond Parks Flat	Rosa L. (McCauley) and Raymond Parks Flat	February 5, 2021 (#100006131)	3201-3203 Virginia Park St. 42°21′52″N 83°06′35″W	West Side	This building is a two-story brick duplex, and is significant as the home of civil rights icon Rosa Parks, who lived in the first floor flat with her husband Raymond from 1961 to 1988.
95	Pasadena Apartments	Pasadena Apartments	October 9, 1985 (#85002944)	2170 E. Jefferson Ave. 42°20′12″N 83°01′34″W	Jefferson Corridor	The building is an early example of upper-class, multi-unit housing, and is one of the earliest of these structures to be built with reinforced concrete. The building was constructed at a time when newly wealthy families associated with Detroit's industrial boom were appearing, yet financing requirements for private homes were substantial enough that renting was a preferred option.
96	Penn Central Station	Penn Central Station	April 16, 1975 (#75000969)	2405 W. Vernor St. 42°19′42″N 83°04′41″W	Corktown – Woodbridge	The unfinished building began operating as Detroit's main passenger depot in 1913; it was constructed as part of a much larger project that involved the Michigan Central Railway Tunnel below the Detroit River for freight and passengers. The building was used for rail service until 1988, and is now abandoned.
97	Pewabic Pottery	Pewabic Pottery	September 3, 1971 (#71000430)	10125 E. Jefferson Ave. 42°21′41″N 82°58′54″W	Jefferson Corridor	This 1907 building, designed by William Stratton, is the home of ceramic artist Mary Chase Perry Stratton's studio and production facilities. Her work in the Arts and Crafts movement raised the artistic standard of American pottery, and is featured in numerous prominent buildings and distinguished institutions.
98	Pilgrim and Puritan Apartment Complex	Pilgrim and Puritan Apartment Complex	August 25, 2014 (#14000514)	9303–9333 E. Jefferson Ave. 42°21′34″N 82°59′04″W	Jefferson Corridor	Designed by Charles N. Agree in 1924, these two apartments provided housing for Detroit's growing professional and middle-class during a time when the surrounding area was being developed with luxury apartment buildings.
99	Piquette Avenue Industrial Historic District	Piquette Avenue Industrial Historic District	June 15, 2004 (#04000601)	Roughly bounded by Woodward, Harper, Hastings and the Grand Trunk Western Railroad Line; 42°22′05″N 83°03′57″W	New Center Area	The area along Piquette was an important center for automobile production in the early 20th century. Ford Motor Company, Studebaker, Cadillac, Dodge, and Regal Motor Car had plants in the area, as well as suppliers such as Fisher Body. In 1911, the two largest automobile producers in the world, Studebaker and Ford, were located next door to each other on Piquette. The district includes the National Historic Landmark Ford Piquette Avenue Plant.
100	Pittsburgh Plate Glass Company Detroit Warehouse	Pittsburgh Plate Glass Company Detroit Warehouse	March 28, 2023 (#100008812)	6045 John C. Lodge Service Dr. 42°21′46″N 83°04′47″W	New Center Area	
101	The Players	The Players	June 12, 1987 (#87000920)	3321 E. Jefferson Ave. 42°20′32″N 83°00′51″W	Jefferson Corridor	The Players Club of Detroit was founded in 1910 by a group of local Detroit businessmen as an institution to encourage amateur theater. In 1925, Players Club member William E. Kapp designed an elaborately decorated two-story building to permanently house the club. It was constructed of what was, at the time, a novel material: cinder blocks. The bed of Bloody Run Creek, where the Battle of Bloody Run took place between Chief Pontiac and British forces, lies underneath one corner of the building.
102	Ponchartrain Apartments	Ponchartrain Apartments	October 9, 1985 (#85002945)	1350 E. Jefferson Ave. 42°20′02″N 83°01′55″W	Jefferson Corridor	The Ponchartrain Apartment building was a four-story red brick structure sitting atop a limestone foundation. The building has been demolished.
103	Redford Theatre Building	Redford Theatre Building	January 31, 1985 (#85000171)	17354 Lahser Ave. 42°25′02″N 83°15′27″W	West Side	The Redford Theatre opened in 1928 and has continuously operated since. The theatre's original 3 manual, 10 rank Barton theatre organ is still in place and operational.
104	Louis G. Redstone Residential Historic District	Louis G. Redstone Residential Historic District	February 24, 2014 (#14000024)	19303, 19309, and 19315 Appoline St. 42°26′00″N 83°10′20″W	West Side	This district consists of three houses located in a row on Appoline Street, designed by architect Louis G. Redstone for himself, his brother, and his business partner. The houses exhibit fundamental characteristics of the International Style, including low hip roofs, corner windows, and curved walls. The design is distinctive in the use of reclaimed common red brick for the exterior, rather than the white stucco usually associated with the International style.
105	River Terrace Apartments	River Terrace Apartments	April 15, 2009 (#09000204)	7700 E. Jefferson St. 42°20′59″N 82°59′49″W	Jefferson Corridor	The River Terrace Apartments was built in 1939 and designed for middle-class tenants. It was one of the first two garden apartment complexes built in Michigan which used loan guarantees from the Federal Housing Administration, and the architectural style exemplifies the FHA standards at the time.
106	Rosedale Park Historic District	Rosedale Park Historic District	July 12, 2006 (#06000587)	Roughly bounded by Fenkell, Outer Dr. W, Grand River Ave., the Southfield Freeway, Glastonbury, Lyndon, Westwood Dr., 42°24′01″N 83°13′37″W	West Side	Construction in Rosedale Park was accomplished primarily in the 1920s and the late 1930s/early 1940s. houses were built in a multitude of styles, including English Tudor revival, Arts and Crafts, Bungalow, Colonial Revival, Dutch Colonial, American Foursquare, Prairie, but an English country esthetic seems to have been encouraged, and many homes have English Tudor details.
107	Sacred Heart Roman Catholic Church, Convent and Rectory	Sacred Heart Roman Catholic Church, Convent and Rectory	June 6, 1980 (#80001926)	1000 Eliot St. 42°21′03″N 83°02′47″W	Eastern Market Area	Sacred Heart, built in 1875, was the third German Roman Catholic church constructed in Detroit. After World War I, the German population slowly moved from the area. In 1938, Sacred Heart was converted from a German parish to an African American parish. The congregation at this time measured approximately 1500 members, and they quickly utilized the school at Sacred Heart, graduating the first high school class in 1945.
108	Sacred Heart Seminary	Sacred Heart Seminary	December 2, 1982 (#82000553)	2701 W. Chicago Boulevard; 42°22′30″N 83°06′41″W	West Side	Sacred Heart Major Seminary is a Catholic institution of higher learning associated with the Archdiocese of Detroit. The seminary building was built in 1923 in the English Tudor Gothic architectural style, with stained glass windows designed by Margaret Bouchez Cavanaugh.
109	St. Albertus Roman Catholic Church	St. Albertus Roman Catholic Church	January 18, 1978 (#78001522)	4231 St. Aubin St. 42°21′36″N 83°02′31″W	East Side	In 1871, St. Albertus Parish was organized with three hundred or so Polish families. A frame church was built in 1872. The parish grew enormously, and in 1882, construction was started on the present building.
110	Ste. Anne Roman Catholic Church Complex	Ste. Anne Roman Catholic Church Complex	June 3, 1976 (#76001040)	Howard and Ste. Anne Sts. 42°19′15″N 83°04′36″W	Southwest Detroit	Ste. Anne de Detroit, founded July 26, 1701, is the second oldest continuously operating Roman Catholic parish in the United States. The current church was built in 1886, and contains some pieces from an earlier 1818 version of Ste. Anne's. The parish today has a largely Hispanic congregation.
111	St. Bonaventure Monastery	St. Bonaventure Monastery	December 2, 1982 (#82000554)	1740 Mt. Elliott Ave; 42°21′04″N 83°00′52″W	Jefferson Corridor	The St. Bonaventure Monastery is a complex of religious buildings, built for the Capuchin Order of Franciscan friars. The friars operate a soup kitchen which, during the Great Depression, provided as many as 3,500 free meals per day. Father Solanus Casey, a Capuchin friar who acted as a porter at St. Bonaventure's, introduced as a candidate for sainthood in 1966.
112	St. Catherine of Siena Roman Catholic Church	St. Catherine of Siena Roman Catholic Church	April 5, 1991 (#91000389)	4151 Seminole; 42°22′17″N 83°00′23″W	East Side	The St. Catherine of Siena Parish complex consists of four architecturally significant buildings: the parish school (1913), convent (1926), rectory (1926), and the church itself (1929). All buildings are basically Romanesque in style, with some Byzantine elements. The church is now the Augustine and St. Monica Roman Catholic Church.
113	St. Charles Borromeo Roman Catholic Parish Complex	St. Charles Borromeo Roman Catholic Parish Complex	June 9, 1989 (#89000488)	Baldwin Ave. at St. Paul Ave. 42°21′18″N 83°00′07″W	Jefferson Corridor	In 1886, a parish dedicated to St. Charles Borromeo was established to minister to the eastside area where an influx of Belgians had settled. As Detroit grew, the parish grew along with it, with French, German, Irish, Scotch, and English congregants in addition to the original Belgians. By 1920, the congregation numbered over 3000.
114	St. John's-St. Luke's Evangelical Church	St. John's-St. Luke's Evangelical Church	April 22, 1982 (#82002907)	2120 Russell St. 42°20′36″N 83°02′17″W	Eastern Market Area	St. John's – St. Luke's is the oldest German Protestant church in Detroit, and was the base from which twelve other German Protestant churches in the city were formed. The church was originally constructed in 1874 from brick, but in 1915 the exterior was completely covered in Formstone, a cast concrete made to resemble limestone.
115	St. Joseph's Episcopal Church	St. Joseph's Episcopal Church	August 3, 1982 (#82002908)	5930 Woodward Ave. 42°21′53″N 83°04′09″W	New Center Area	The church, built from 1893 to 1896 and originally named St. Joseph's Episcopal Church, is a massive rock-faced, cross-gable-roofed, sandstone, Romanesque Revival structure. In 1907, it was sold to a Catholic congregation.
116	St. Joseph's Episcopal Church	St. Joseph's Episcopal Church	August 3, 1982 (#82002909)	8850 Woodward Ave. 42°22′52″N 83°04′47″W	North End	The church building is a typical Gothic structure with a narrow gabled nave and projecting side aisles. A large rose window faces Woodward, and a tall bell tower is to the south. The structure is now St. Matthew's-St. Joseph's Episcopal Church.
117	St. Joseph's Roman Catholic Church	St. Joseph's Roman Catholic Church	December 8, 1972 (#72000670)	1828 Jay St. 42°20′43″N 83°02′08″W	Eastern Market Area	St. Joseph's is a historic German Catholic parish; the current church was constructed in 1870-73. It is still in full operation today. Three subsidiary buildings -- the rectory, convent, and the Wermers House -- were added to the listing in 1992.
118	Saint Mary of Redford Catholic Church	Saint Mary of Redford Catholic Church	April 7, 2025 (#100011641)	16098 Grand River Ave; 42°23′47″N 83°12′21″W	West Side	
119	Saint Matthew Parish	Saint Matthew Parish	April 4, 2023 (#100008814)	6021 Whittier Ave. 42°24′43″N 82°56′33″W	East Side	
120	Saint Paul Manor Apartments	Saint Paul Manor Apartments	April 9, 1999 (#99000435)	356 E. Grand Boulevard; 42°21′13″N 83°00′21″W	Jefferson Corridor	The Saint Paul Manor, situated in the East Grand Boulevard Historic District, was built as an upper-middle-class apartment building in 1925.
121	Saint Rita Apartments	Saint Rita Apartments	March 13, 2017 (#100000749)	35 Owen St. 42°23′00″N 83°04′52″W	North End	The Saint Rita Apartments is a six-story English Renaissance Revival red brick apartment building, built as an upscale apartment building in 1916. By 1990, the apartment building had been converted into subsidized housing, and was closed in 2005. The Saint Rita Apartments reopened in 2019 as 26 units of "Permanent Supportive Housing" for veterans.
122	St. Stanislaus Bishop and Martyr Roman Catholic Church	St. Stanislaus Bishop and Martyr Roman Catholic Church	July 14, 1989 (#89000788)	5818 Dubois St. 42°22′19″N 83°02′49″W	East Side	In 1898, the parish of St. Stanislaus was established to relieve the overcrowding in the Polish congregation of at St. Albertus. In 1911, work was begun on a magnificent Baroque church with a lavish Beaux Arts interior, which was completed in 1913. The church is now used by the Promise Land Missionary Baptist Church.
123	St. Theresa of Avila Roman Catholic Church	St. Theresa of Avila Roman Catholic Church	July 14, 1989 (#89000786)	8666 Quincy Ave. 42°21′49″N 83°07′11″W	West Side	The St. Theresa of Avila Roman Catholic Parish Complex consists of the church, rectory, school, and convent. All of the buildings are essentially Neo-Romanesque in character, with Byzantine and Art Deco influences. They are constructed of dark red brick trimmed with Indiana limestone.
124	Shrine of the Black Madonna of the Pan African Orthodox Christian Church	Shrine of the Black Madonna of the Pan African Orthodox Christian Church	February 5, 2021 (#100006132)	7625 Linwood St. 42°21′47″N 83°06′07″W	West Side	This church, designed by George D. Mason, was built in 1925. It was purchased by civil rights leader Rev. Albert B. Cleage Jr. and his Central Congregational Church in 1957, and was remnamed for the 1967 murla painted by Black artist Glanton Dowdell . The church is significant for its association with Cleage and as the location of many significant 20th century African American civil rights activities.
125	Sibley House	Sibley House	April 16, 1971 (#71000432)	976 Jefferson Ave. 42°19′59″N 83°02′06″W	Jefferson Corridor	The Sibley house is a clapboard, side-gabled Greek Revival-style home, and is one of the oldest structures in Detroit. It was built by Sarah Sproat Sibley, widow of Solomon Sibley, in 1848.
126	Frederic M. Sibley Lumber Company Office Building	Frederic M. Sibley Lumber Company Office Building	April 4, 1991 (#91000329)	6460 Kercheval Ave. 42°21′11″N 83°00′49″W	Jefferson Corridor	The Frederic M. Sibley Lumber Company Office Building was built in a Neo-Classical style in 1925. At the time, the Sibley Lumber Company employed 400 people and was the second largest lumber firm in Detroit.
127	Somerset Apartments	Somerset Apartments	October 9, 1985 (#85002946)	1523 E. Jefferson Ave. 42°20′07″N 83°01′47″W	Jefferson Corridor	The Somerset Apartments were five interconnected rectangular buildings, each four stories, built in a row running rearward from Jefferson. It was an excellent example of high-quality middle-class residential architecture from the 1920s. It burned in late 2013 and was demolished in 2014.
128	Frederick K. Stearns House	Frederick K. Stearns House	October 9, 1985 (#85002947)	8109 E. Jefferson Ave. 42°21′07″N 82°59′42″W	Jefferson Corridor	This house is a two-and-one-half-story house constructed from hollow tile for Frederick K. Stearns, founder of a pharmaceutical company. It is significant because of its fine medieval and Arts and Crafts design.
129	Frederick Stearns Building	Frederick Stearns Building	October 14, 1980 (#80001927)	6533 E. Jefferson Ave. 42°20′45″N 83°00′24″W	Jefferson Corridor	The Frederick Stearns Building is a pharmaceutical manufacturing plant, originally containing Stearns's production facilities as well as warehouses and white-collar offices. The first three stories of this building were constructed in 1899, the fourth floor was added later. A taller concrete addition, designed by Albert Kahn, was built around 1910.
130	Ossian H. Sweet House	Ossian H. Sweet House	April 4, 1985 (#85000696)	2905 Garland; 42°22′13″N 82°59′03″W	East Side	In 1925, African-American physician Ossian Sweet moved into this house in what was then an all-white neighborhood. A hostile mob confronted Sweet and his friends, and after a standoff, someone in the house shot and killed one of the whites outside. A landmark trial, where attorney Clarence Darrow argued self-defense, resulted in a hung jury and no further prosecution of Sweet.
131	Sweetest Heart of Mary Roman Catholic Church	Sweetest Heart of Mary Roman Catholic Church	January 31, 1978 (#78001523)	4440 Russell St. 42°21′30″N 83°02′52″W	East Side	Sweetest Heart Of Mary is the largest Roman Catholic Church in Detroit. At the time of construction, Sweetest Heart was a Polish parish, which had split from St. Albertus parish, and established a new parish outside the jurisdiction of the mother church. The parish was later reconciled, and this impressive Gothic Revival church returned to the Roman Catholic fold.
132	Temple Baptist Church – King Solomon Baptist Church	Temple Baptist Church – King Solomon Baptist Church	April 20, 2015 (#15000159)	6102 and 6125 14th St. 42°21′35″N 83°05′33″W	West Side	The church consists of two buildings: the original church, a Tudor Revival structure built in 1917, and the later church, an Art Deco building constructed in 1937. In 1934 Rev. J. Frank Norris began his tenure as pastor there. Sold in 1951 to King Solomon Baptist Church, it served as an important venue for Civil Rights leaders.
133	Temple Beth-El	Temple Beth-El	August 3, 1982 (#82002912)	8801 Woodward Ave. 42°22′50″N 83°04′52″W	North End	This Albert Kahn-designed building was home to Detroit's Temple Beth El from 1922 to 1974. The building is now known as the Bethel Community Transformation Center.
134	Third Precinct Police Station	Third Precinct Police Station	February 29, 1980 (#80001928)	2200 Hunt St. 42°21′02″N 83°01′58″W	East Side	This police station is a well-preserved example of a late-19th-century Beaux Arts public building, and is significant for its role in the history of the Detroit police force. It was in use as a police station from 1896 until 1959. It is currently used as office space and is known as the Sun Center Building.
135	Trinity Episcopal Church	Trinity Episcopal Church	May 22, 1980 (#80001929)	1519 Martin Luther King Boulevard; 42°20′29″N 83°04′22″W	Corktown – Woodbridge	Trinity Episcopal Church was built in 1893 by James E. Scripps, owner of the Detroit News. Scripps was born in London and developed a fascination with historic English churches; he commissioned Trinity to be in the English Gothic style. The exterior of the building boasts over two hundred carvings, including gargoyles that serve as water drains. In 2006, Trinity's congregation merged with Faith Memorial Lutheran to become Spirit of Hope.
136	Trinity Evangelical Lutheran Church Complex	Trinity Evangelical Lutheran Church Complex	February 10, 1983 (#83000897)	1345 Gratiot Ave. 42°20′34″N 83°02′23″W	Eastern Market Area	The Trinity congregation was originally a German-speaking congregation, formed in 1850 when members of St. Matthew's Lutheran Church broke away from the main body following the excommunication of another member. As the flow of German-speaking immigrants dried up, Trinity began offering English-language services. The current building was dedicated in 1931.
137	Charles Trowbridge House	Charles Trowbridge House	May 28, 1976 (#76001042)	1380 E. Jefferson Ave. 42°20′01″N 83°01′58″W	Jefferson Corridor	The Charles Trowbridge House, built in 1826, is the oldest known structure in the city of Detroit. Charles Christopher Trowbridge built the house and lived there until his death in 1883. It was originally built in a Greek Revival style, and later updated with Victorian elements.
138	Sojourner Truth Homes	Sojourner Truth Homes	September 15, 2022 (#100008140)	4525 and 4801 East Nevada St. 42°25′34″N 83°03′18″W		
139	United States Immigration Station	United States Immigration Station	May 22, 2013 (#13000322)	333 Mount Elliott St. 42°20′36″N 83°00′37″W	Jefferson Corridor	The United States Immigration Station, now the Rosa Parks Federal Building, was originally constructed as nurse's housing for the Detroit Marine Hospital. When the Marine Hospital was moved, the Detroit Border Patrol Station was installed in the building.
140	United States Postal Service Roosevelt Park Station	United States Postal Service Roosevelt Park Station	December 23, 2020 (#100005983)	1800 18th St. 42°19′36″N 83°04′44″W		
141	Vanity Ballroom Building	Vanity Ballroom Building	November 12, 1982 (#82000556)	1024 Newport St. 42°22′42″N 82°57′01″W	Jefferson Corridor	The Vanity Ballroom Building contains the last remaining intact ballroom of the multiple Detroit dance halls that hosted big bands in the 1930s-50s. It is built in a flamboyant Art Deco style with an Aztec theme. The 5,600-square-foot (520 m^{2}) dance floor was built on springs, giving the dancers a "bounce" and they moved.
142	Vaughn's Book Store	Vaughn's Book Store	August 4, 2023 (#100009177)	12115–12123 Dexter Ave. 42°22′55″N 83°07′33″W	West Side	
143	Virginia Park Historic District	Virginia Park Historic District	December 2, 1982 (#82000557)	Both sides of Virginia Park From Woodward Ave. to John Lodge Service Dr. 42°22′29″N 83°04′54″W	New Center Area	In 1893, Virginia Park was platted with 92 relatively small lots. Requirements ensured that only well-to-do businessmen and professionals could afford to erect a home in the neighborhood. Most of the homes were built between 1893 and 1915, in Tudor, Neo-Georgian, Bungalow and Arts and Crafts architectural styles.
144	WGPR-TV Studio	WGPR-TV Studio	January 27, 2021 (#100006101)	3146 E. Jefferson Ave. 42°20′25″N 83°01′01″W	Jefferson Corridor	This pair of early 20th century commercial buildings housed WGPR-TV studios from 1975 to 1995. WGPR-TV was the first Black-owned television station in the nation, and offered local programming and opportunities for Black professionals on both sides of the camera.
145	WJBK-TV Studios Building	WJBK-TV Studios Building	April 19, 2016 (#16000180)	7441 Second Ave. 42°22′16″N 83°04′39″W	New Center Area	This building was constructed in 1956 by Storer Broadcasting Inc to house studios for WJBK television. The station produced news and programming here until 1971, when it was sold to Detroit's public television station WTVS.
146	Franklin H. Walker House	Franklin H. Walker House	October 9, 1985 (#85002948)	2730 E. Jefferson Ave. 42°20′21″N 83°01′11″W	Jefferson Corridor	This home was built in 1896 for Franklin H. Walker, a son of Hiram Walker and president of the Hiram Walker Distillery. The house was notable for its immense size, diverse building materials, and medieval motif. The house was used until 1980 as Doctor's Hospital. It has since been demolished.
147	Warren Motor Car Company Building	Warren Motor Car Company Building	March 20, 2020 (#100005108)	1331 Holden St. 42°21′46″N 83°04′59″W	West side	Warren Motor Car Company was founded in 1909 by real estate magnate Homer Warren. Warren hired the Detroit architectural firm of Rogers and MacFarlane to design a series of building to fill the site. These buildings were constructed and occupied in 1910. However, Warren Motor Car went bankrupt in 1913, and a series of automobile companies occupied the buildings, including Lincoln Motor Company and the Ford Motor Company. Grocery firms occupied the buildings after WWII, and as of 2019, the Holden facility housed a recycling center, an artist studio, and a public art gallery.
148	William H. Wells House	William H. Wells House	October 9, 1985 (#85002949)	2931 E. Jefferson Ave. 42°20′28″N 83°01′00″W	Jefferson Corridor	The William H. Wells House, designed by architect William Henry Miller, is an outstanding example of Romanesque revival residential architecture in Detroit.
149	West Jefferson Avenue–Rouge River Bridge	West Jefferson Avenue–Rouge River Bridge	February 10, 2000 (#00000079)	W. Jefferson Ave. over the River Rouge; 42°16′50″N 83°07′44″W	Southwest Detroit	Built in 1922, this "Chicago city type of single trunnion, double-leaf bascule bridge" replaced a narrow swing bridge, allowing the Rouge River to be widened to provide freighter access to the Ford River Rouge Complex. The Rouge River marks the boundary between the cities of River Rouge and Detroit, and this listing is also included in the List of Registered Historic Places in Wayne County, Michigan.
150	West Side Dom Polski	West Side Dom Polski	February 1, 2007 (#06001332)	3426 Junction Ave. 42°19′50″N 83°06′38″W	Southwest Detroit	This Dom Polski, or Polish home, was established on the west side of the city as a meeting hall and social club for the Polish-Americans that had established a community in the area. The structure's first cornerstone was laid in 1917, but financial difficulties delayed building completion until 1925.
151	West Vernor-Junction Historic District	West Vernor-Junction Historic District	December 12, 2002 (#02001503)	W. Vernor Highway between Lansing and Cavalry; 42°19′02″N 83°06′07″W	Southwest Detroit	The West Vernor-Junction Historic District is a commercial district located along West Vernor Highway. The district encompasses 160 acres (0.65 km^{2}) and 44 buildings, including the Most Holy Redeemer Church, which was once estimated as the largest Catholic parish in North America.
152	West Vernor-Lawndale Historic District	West Vernor-Lawndale Historic District	December 12, 2002 (#02001501)	W. Vernor Highway between Cabot and Ferris; 42°18′33″N 83°07′57″W	Southwest Detroit	The West Vernor-Lawndale Historic District is a commercial district located along West Vernor Highway between. The district encompasses 30 acres (120,000 m^{2}) and 10 buildings.
153	West Vernor-Springwells Historic District	West Vernor-Springwells Historic District	December 12, 2002 (#02001502)	W. Vernor Highway between Honorah and Norman; 42°18′44″N 83°07′35″W	Southwest Detroit	The West Vernor-Springwells Historic District is a commercial district located along West Vernor Highway. The district encompasses 80 acres (320,000 m^{2}) and 28 buildings.
154	West Village Historic District	West Village Historic District	October 14, 1980 (#80001930)	Roughly bounded by Jefferson, Kercheval, Parker and Seyburn Aves. 42°21′16″N 82°59′53″W	Jefferson Corridor	The West Village Historic District is a neighborhood just west of Indian Village Historic District. It is a primarily residential neighborhoods containing 275 single and two-family houses, thirty apartment buildings, and about twenty commercial structures of a wide range of architectural styles spread over 20 square blocks.
155	Whittier Hotel	Whittier Hotel	October 9, 1985 (#85002950)	415 Burns Dr. 42°21′17″N 82°59′23″W	Jefferson Corridor	The Whittier Hotel was constructed as an apartment hotel, meaning that tenants could rent an apartment, yet have access to services typically provided by a hotel. The hotel actually consists of two separate structures: an eight-story building to the north and a larger fifteen-story Italian Renaissance style hotel to the south (closer to the river). The northern building has been turned into a senior citizen's living center, known as the Whittier Manor.
156	Woodbridge Historic District	Woodbridge Historic District	March 6, 1980 (#80001931)	Bounded by Trumbull, Calumet, Gibson, Grand River, 12th W. Warren and Wabash Sts., railroad tracks, and Edsel Ford Expressway; also 4304-14 Trumbull Ave. and 3800 Grand River; also the southeastern corner of Trumbull and Warren; 42°20′50″N 83°04′42″W	Corktown – Woodbridge	The Woodbridge neighborhood was primarily developed between 1870 and 1920 with single and two family residences built in Queen Anne, Colonial Revival, Georgian Revival, and 'cottage' style architecture. Commercial districts in the neighborhood were located along Grand River, Trumbull, Twelfth and Fourteenth. The boundaries of the District were increased twice: first on 1997-12-01, and 2008-03-20; these are distinguished in the boundary listings with "also" descriptions.
157	Woodward Avenue Presbyterian Church	Woodward Avenue Presbyterian Church	August 3, 1982 (#82002916)	8501 Woodward Ave. 42°22′41″N 83°04′46″W	North End	The Woodward Avenue Presbyterian Church was built in 1911 in the Gothic revival style by architect Sidney Badgley. The exterior is faced with rough rock and trimmed with a contrasting limestone. The church was for some time the Abyssinia Church of God in Christ.

== Former listings ==
	Name on the Register	Image	Date listed	Date removed	Location	Description
1	Chateau Frontenac Apartments	Chateau Frontenac Apartments	February 28, 1991 (#91000213)	June 10, 2020	10410 E. Jefferson Ave. 42°21′47″N 82°58′43″W	The Chateau Frontenac was an eight-story apartment building constructed from buff brick, with off-white terra cotta details and a hipped roof of green Spanish tile. It has been demolished.
2	Fort Street–Pleasant Street and Norfolk & Western Railroad Viaduct	Fort Street–Pleasant Street and Norfolk & Western Railroad Viaduct	February 18, 2000 (#00000116)	August 8, 2022	Fort St. over Pleasant St. and the Norfolk Southern railroad line 42°17′04″N 83°08′54″W	This Fort Street bridge was by far the largest and most ambitious structure included in the 1920s grade separation plan, where major streets and rail lines were separated with a series of bridges and subways. Fort Street was, at the time, designated a "superhighway", requiring the bridge to be 80 feet (24 m) in width; the tracks underneath required a 2,800 feet (850 m) span.
3	Grand Riviera Theater	Grand Riviera Theater	April 22, 1982 (#82002901)	June 10, 2020	9222 Grand River Ave. 42°21′58″N 83°07′51″W	The Grand Riviera was built in 1925, at a cost of over one million dollars. It seated over three thousand patrons, and was the first "atmospheric" theater in Detroit, using lighting, special effects, and interior design to make the audience feel like they were sitting outdoors in a garden. Due to structural deterioration, the Grand Riviera Theater was demolished in 1997.
4	Jefferson Hall	Jefferson Hall	October 9, 1985 (#85002939)	December 2, 2024	1404 E. Jefferson Ave. 42°20′06″N 83°01′50″W	Jefferson Hall was a four-story "garden court" style apartment, where apartments are arranged in a U-shape around a central courtyard. It has been demolished.
5	Lincoln Motor Company Plant	Lincoln Motor Company Plant	June 2, 1978 (#78001521)	April 4, 2005	6200 W Warren Ave. 42°20′54″N 83°07′52″W	Henry M. Leland acquired a factory here in 1917 and greatly expanded it in order to produce Liberty Engines as part of the World War I war effort. After the war, Leland used his long and prominent experience with Cadillac to inaugurate the Lincoln line of automobiles. Leland sold his company to Henry Ford in 1922; by 1952 this original Lincoln plant was retired from automotive production. Most of the complex was demolished in 2002/03, leading to withdrawal of its National Register listing and National Historic Landmark designation.
6	St. Boniface Roman Catholic Church	St. Boniface Roman Catholic Church	June 9, 1989 (#89000487)	August 8, 2022	2356 Vermont Ave. 42°19′57″N 83°04′26″W	St. Boniface was built in 1873 to serve the German Roman Catholic church residing on the west side of Detroit. The parish was closed in 1989, and the building demolished a few years later.
7	Ste. Claire (Steamer)	Ste. Claire (Steamer)	November 2, 1979 (#79001177)	December 20, 2023	11000 Freud St (in Detroit River near foot of St Jean St); 42°21′18″N 82°57′55″W	Designed by naval architect Frank E. Kirby. Between 1910 and 1991, the Ste. Claire ferried passengers to Bois Blanc Island (Boblo) for the Detroit & Windsor Ferry Company. The Ste. Claire was listed in the National Register in 1979 and became a National Historic Landmark in 1992. In 2016 she was docked in the Rouge River in Detroit, then moved to the Riverside Marina on the Detroit River. There on July 6, 2018, a devastating fire caused severe damage during repairs. As a result, the Ste. Claire lost her NHL status and was delisted from the NRHP in 2023.
8	St. Thomas the Apostle Catholic Church	St. Thomas the Apostle Catholic Church	June 29, 1989 (#89000785)	July 23, 2024	8363-8383 Townsend Ave. 42°23′24″N 83°01′28″W	St. Thomas the Apostle Parish was a Polish-American Roman Catholic parish founded in 1914, at the eastern edge of the predominantly Polish sections of Detroit. A church was constructed in 1923, and the parish had both a grade school and a high school. The church has been demolished, and the school currently serves as the St. Thomas Assessment Center for troubled youths.
9	Tiger Stadium	Tiger Stadium	February 6, 1989 (#88003236)	September 1, 2022	2121 Trumbull Ave. 42°19′57″N 83°04′08″W	The original site of Detroit Tigers baseball opened at the corner of Michigan and Trumbull in 1895 when owner George Vanderbeck opened Bennett Park. Successive owners enlarged the park, with Frank Navin increasing seating to 23,000 (renaming the park Navin Field) and Walter Briggs increasing it to 53,000 (renaming the park Briggs Stadium). In 1951, the name was changed to Tiger Stadium. The city demolished the original stadium on June 30, 2008. In 2000, a replacement debuted at Comerica Park.

== See also ==
- List of National Historic Landmarks in Michigan
- National Register of Historic Places listings in Michigan
- List of Michigan State Historic Sites in Wayne County, Michigan
