= Louis G. Redstone Residential Historic District =

Historic district in Michigan, United States

- U.S. National Register of Historic Places
- U.S. Historic district
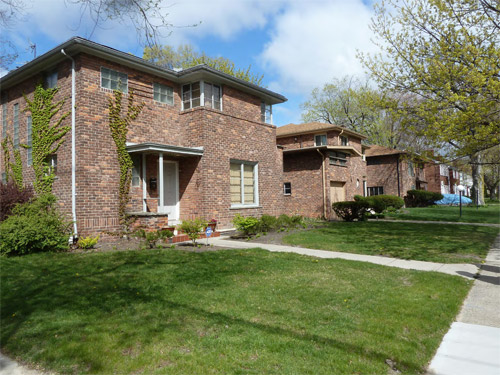

- Location within Michigan
- Interactive map
- Location: 19303, 19309 and 19315 Appoline Street, Detroit, Michigan
- Coordinates: 42°26′0″N 83°10′20″W
- Built: 1940
- Architect: Louis G. Redstone
- Architectural style: International Style
- NRHP reference No.: 14000024
- Added to NRHP: February 24, 2014

The Louis G. Redstone Residential Historic District consists of three houses located at 19303, 19309 and 19315 Appoline Street in the Greenwich Park neighborhood in northwest Detroit. It was listed on the National Register of Historic Places in 2014.

The houses were designed by Redstone for occupancy by himself (19303 Appoline), his brother Solomon Redstone (19309 Appoline), and his business partner, architect Henry J . Abrams (19315 Appoline). The district is significant because the houses exhibit many of the fundamental characteristics of the International Style, as evidenced by the simple geometric form and proportions with lack of ornamentation, the low-sloped hip roofs, and use of corner windows, textured glass block, and curved bays. The design of the houses is distinctive in the use of reclaimed common red brick for the exterior, rather than the white stucco usually associated with the International style.

The site also includes a perimeter brick wall that encloses the common rear yards, an outdoor cook stove, and a small wading pool decorated with stylized snail sculptures by artist Samuel Cashwan.

== Louis G. Redstone ==
Louis Redstone was born as Louis Gordon Routenstein on March 16, 1903, in Grodno (then located in Russia, now in Belarus). Louis's father ran a small military supply business providing uniforms to the Russian Army. Louis attended school in Grodno and developed a desire to become an architect. Louis's brother Sol emigrated to the United States in 1916, there changing his surname to "Redstone" and eventually making his way to Detroit. Louis followed his brother in 1923.

Louis began his career in the United States by working as a construction laborer and mason during the day, and studying both English and blue-print reading in the evenings. In 1925 he enrolled at the University of Michigan, and graduated with a bachelor's degree in architecture in 1929. After graduation, Redstone worked with Albert Kahn Associates. However, the Great Depression intervened, and Redstone moved on to work for Ford Motor Company designing plants in the Soviet Union and then opened his own practice in Tel Aviv. There he worked at the Levant Fair designing pavilions, many in the International Style. He also received a number of commissions for moderate-sized apartment buildings.

Redstone returned to Michigan in 1937 and opened his own practice, starting with many residential commissions. He championed the concept of shared yards, a design feature used in the Appoline houses. In 1938, Louis's brother Sol was married, and in 1939 Louis married Ruth Roslyn Rosenbaum. A few years after this he began designing the houses on Appoline Street for their families.

Redstone continued to practice professionally, designing a number of shopping centers during the 1950s. He was also active in the American Institute of Architects, and was inducted into their College of Fellows in 1964. Louis Redstone died in 2002 at the age of 99, but the Redstone architectural firm continues to operate today.

== Description ==
The three houses in the Louis G. Redstone Residential District are situated in a contiguous row on Appoline Street. All three are two-story, structures of reclaimed red brick, built in the International Style. The houses feature curved walls, low hip roofs, and steel casement and glass block windows. Each house has an attached single-car garage. The houses are tightly spaced, with a uniform setback, and the common backyard is enclosed with a red brick perimeter wall with no intermediate dividing walls. Benches and cantilevered stone shelves are incorporated Into the wall, as is a large outdoor grille and cooking stove. In the center of the backyard is a small concrete wading pool featuring two stylized snail sculptures, one at each end of the pool.

On the interior, the three houses feature 2,000 square feet of living space, similarly arranged in all three. Interior walls and ceilings are finished primarily in plaster with some rooms featuring curly maple paneling. The interiors also have open stairways and built-in cabinets, shelving and niches. The wall are curved, with corner windows providing natural light and ventilation.

The houses have been slightly modified since construction, by enclosing of balconies and porches and the construction of small single room additions.

== See also ==
- National Register of Historic Places listings in Detroit, Michigan
