= River Terrace Apartments =

United States historic place

- U.S. National Register of Historic Places
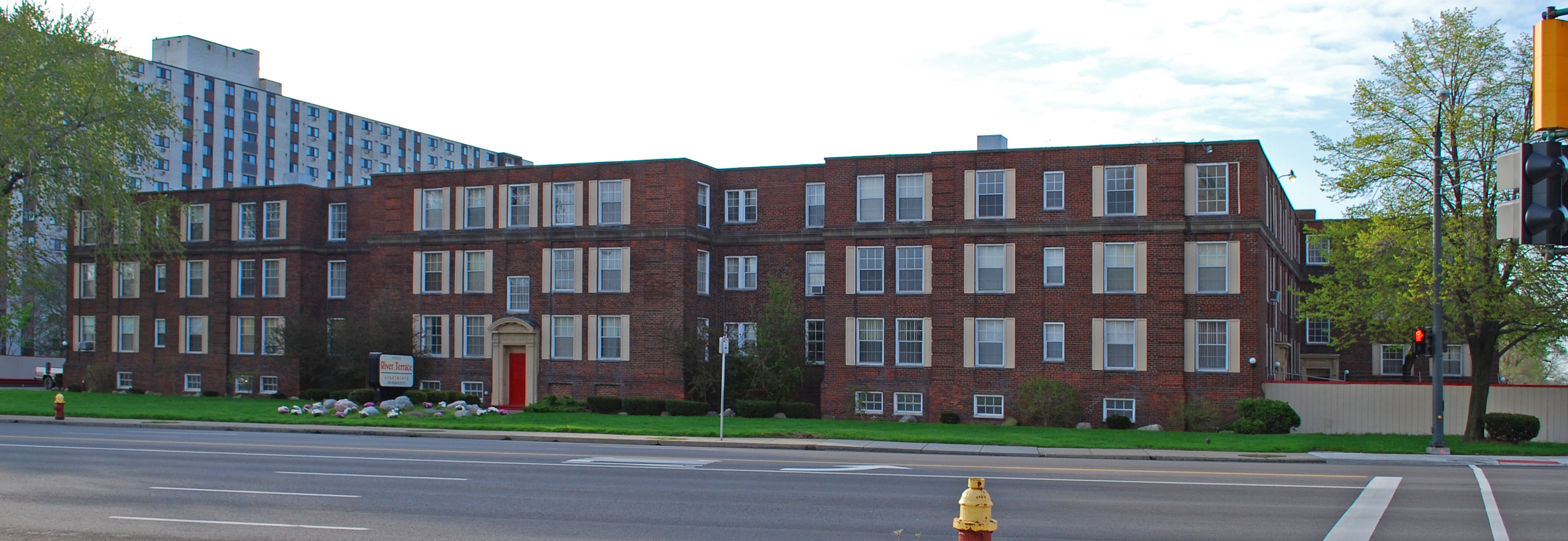

- Location within Michigan Location within the United States
- Interactive map
- Location: 7700 East Jefferson Avenue; Detroit, Michigan
- Coordinates: 42°20′56″N 82°59′46″W
- Area: 5.5 acres (2.2 ha)
- Built: 1939
- Architect: Robert O. Derrick, Derrick & Gamber
- Architectural style: Colonial Revival
- NRHP reference No.: 09000204
- Added to NRHP: April 15, 2009

The River Terrace Apartments is an apartment building located at 7700 East Jefferson Avenue in Detroit, Michigan. It was listed on the National Register of Historic Places in 2009. River Terrace Apartments was one of the first two garden apartment complexes built in Michigan which used loan guarantees from the Federal Housing Administration, the other being Hillcrest Village in East Lansing.

== History ==
By the late 19th century, the corridor along East Jefferson Avenue had become a prestigious residential neighborhood. As the automobile age dawned in the twentieth century and Detroit's population boomed, large upscale apartment buildings were constructed along the Avenue. However, this boom in apartment construction collapsed at the start of the Great Depression. However, in 1939, Wesson Seyburn, along with Leonard P. Reaume, of the property management firm of Holden & Reaume, applied for a building permit to construct this apartment building. It was the first new apartment complex to be constructed along the river since the late 1920s.

The owners engaged the architectural firm of Derrick & Gamber to design this apartment building, and it was completed in late 1939 at a cost of $1,250,000. The River Terrace Apartments were first marketed toward primarily middle-class tenants. They remain used as apartments until the present.

== Description ==
The River Terrace Apartments are a "garden court" type of apartment complex, consisting of four separate structures surrounding a large garden / lawn space. The garden space slopes down toward the Detroit River, and the apartment buildings are situated to provide river views and access to the shoreline. Each structure has a different footprint, although they all share Georgian Revival architectural details. All buildings have limestone beltcourses between the second and third stories, and the comers of each building have raised brick quoining. The architectural style of the complex exemplifies the FHA standards at the time.

All four buildings are 2-1/2 to four stories tall, and are constructed with steel framing, cinder block walls faced with red brick, and flat roofs. The complex contains 178 apartments, varying in size from 2-1/2 room studio apartments to 5 room full apartments. Building number one is U-shaped, with the base of the U fronting on Jefferson. It is 3 1/2 stories tall, with a half-story basement level. The facade has a central section, containing the entrance and two flanking windows, which projects slightly from the main section of the building. The entrance is set in a pilaster with a segmental pediment wood frame. Building two forms a long undulating line behind the southwest corner of building one, extending almost to the river. Building three and four are separated from building two by a long courtyard, and zigzag toward the river from the southeast corner of building one.

== See also ==
- National Register of Historic Places listings in Detroit, Michigan
