= Church of the Transfiguration Historic District =

- U.S. National Register of Historic Places
- U.S. Historic district
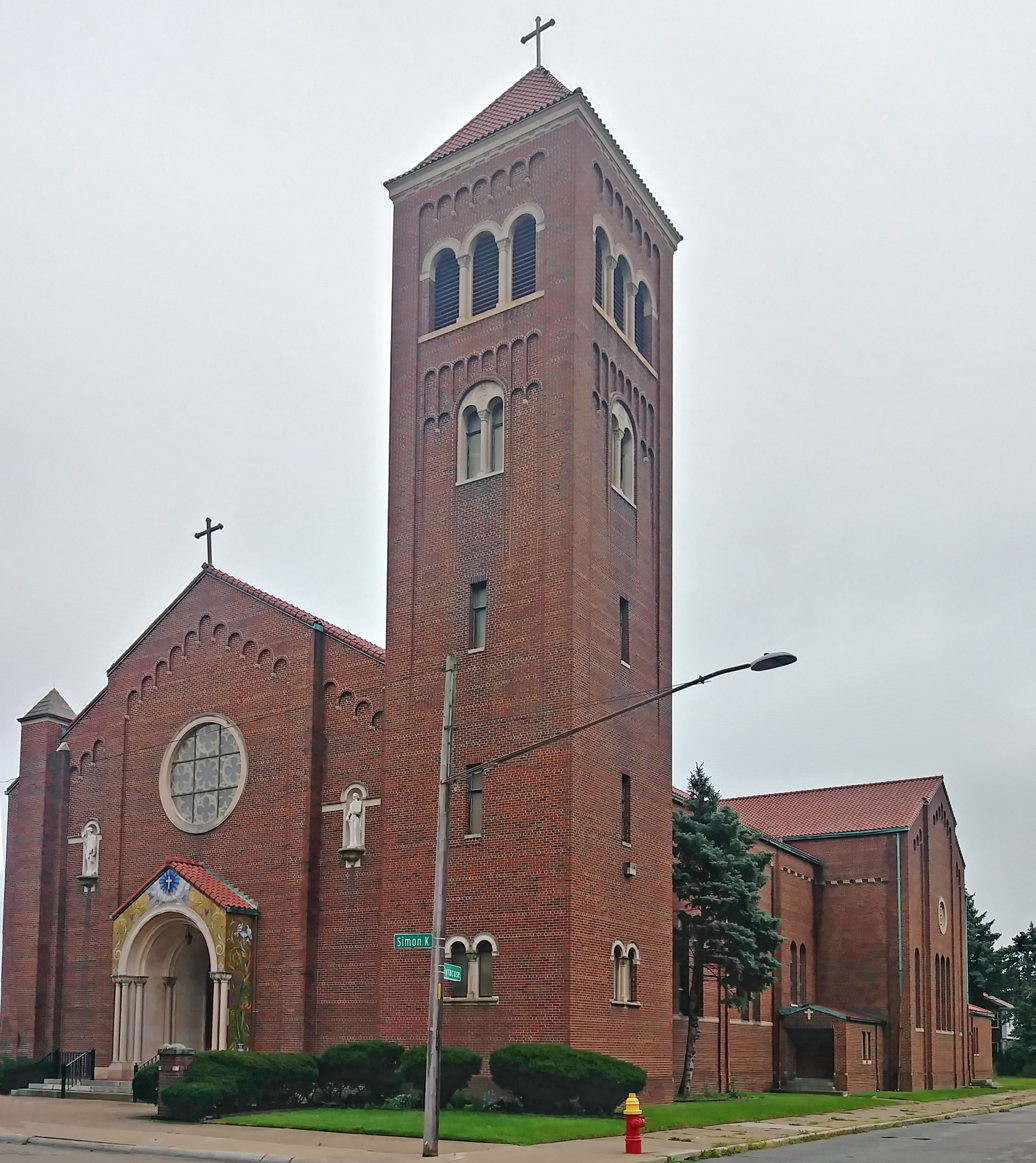
- 1948 Church
- Interactive map
- Location: 5830 Simon K Detroit, Michigan
- Coordinates: 42°24′53″N 83°2′38″W
- Built: 1926
- Built by: Arthur O. Misch Company
- Architects: Narcyz Kostrzanowski, Garstecki & Waier, Walter J. Rozycki, Erroll R. Clark
- Architectural style: Italian Renaissance Revival, Modern
- NRHP reference No.: 100004383
- Added to NRHP: September 16, 2019

The Church of the Transfiguration Historic District is a group of buildings associated with what was the Church of the Transfiguration Roman Catholic parish (and is now the Saint John Paul II parish), located at 5830 Simon K in Detroit, Michigan. It was listed on the National Register of Historic Places in 2019.

== History ==
This section of Detroit was annexed to the city in 1916, and in the early 1920s a large influx of Polish immigrants made their homes in the neighborhood. The new immigrants desired a church where Polish was spoken, and the Transfiguration Parish was founded in 1925. A frame church was quickly built, and in 1926 the cornerstone was laid for a new church and school, designed by Garstecki & Waier. The school was quickly completed, and had over 700 students the first year. A rectory was built in 1927, and a convent in 1929.

The parish continued to grow through the 1930s and into the 1940s. By 1946, the school building, which also served as the church, was severely overcrowded, and a new church building was planned. In 1948, construction was started on the new church, designed by Narcyz Kostrzanowski and constructed by Arthur O. Misch Company. In 1952, a new rectory was constructed, and in 1961 an activities building was constructed.

However, in the 1960s the size of the parish was shrinking. This trend continued through the following decades, and the school closed in 2005, with the building leased to a charter school until 2014. In 2012, other local parishes were merged with Transfiguration, and the parish renamed Blessed John Paul II. When Pope John Paul II was canonized in 2014 the parish name was changed to Saint John Paul II. In 2021, construction began on the school building to convert it into 19 affordable housing units.

== Description ==
The Transfiguration Roman Catholic Church Parish Complex contains six buildings: the church, shrine (with grotto), school, convent, rectory and activities buildings. They are all located near each other in a one-and-half-block area.

The church is an Italian Renaissance style building constructed of multi-tonal brick, with limestone trim and a red clay tile roof. The facade has a three-story gable front with a five-story bell tower on one side. It has a central entrance, approached by three limestone steps which lead to a two-story tall limestone and mosaic tile clad entrance portico. Above the portico is a large rose window.

The school is a two-story tall multi-tone red brick building with a rectangular footprint and a flat roof. It has a raised brick basement with a stone beltcourse above. The shrine is a small building surrounded by a wrought iron fence with brick pillars. The convent is a rectangular shaped, two-story tall brick building. It has an off-center brick porch. The rectory is a two-story tall brick building with a hip roof. The activities building is a modern brick building with a one-story and two-story section.

== Gallery ==
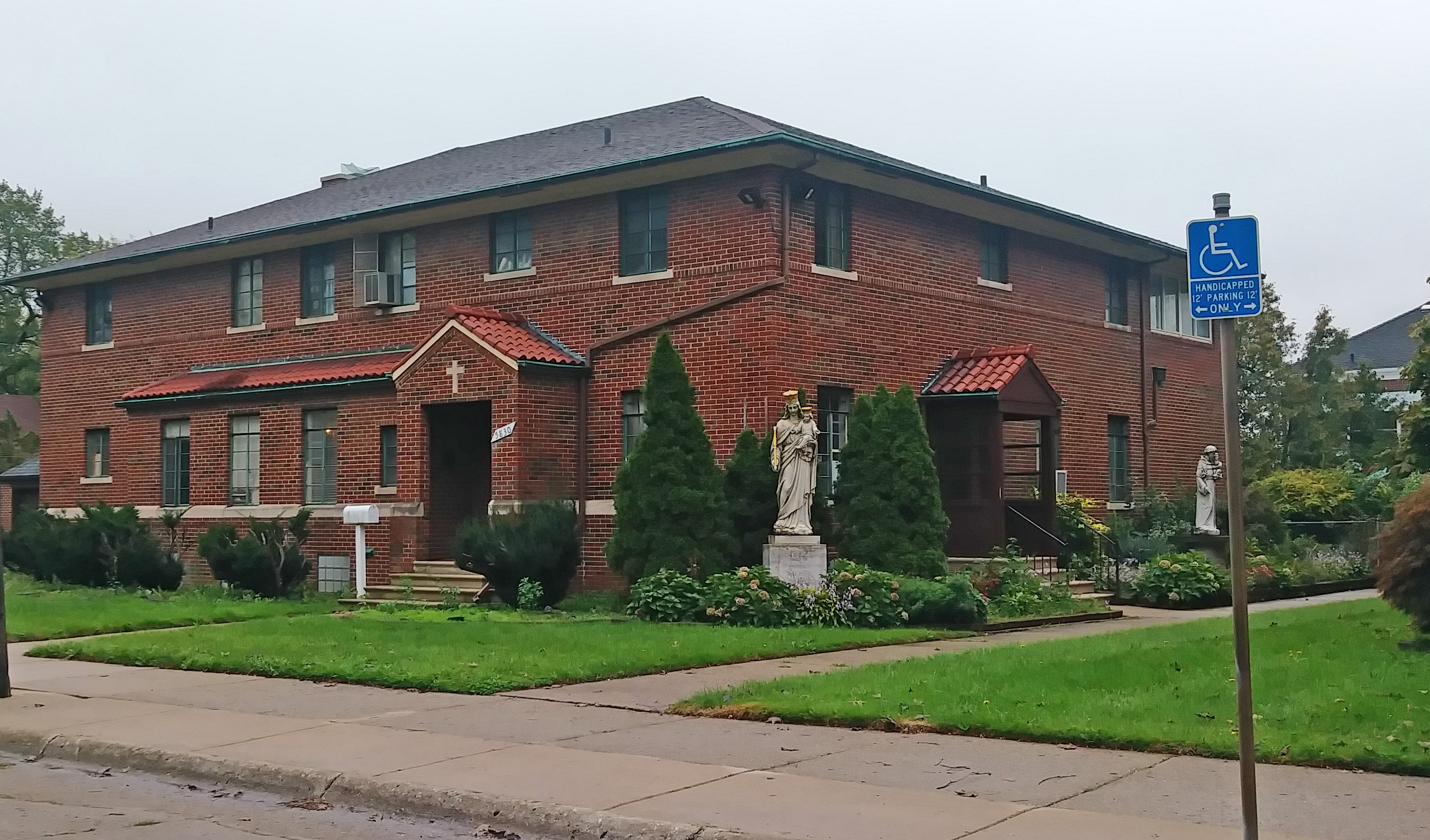
Rectory

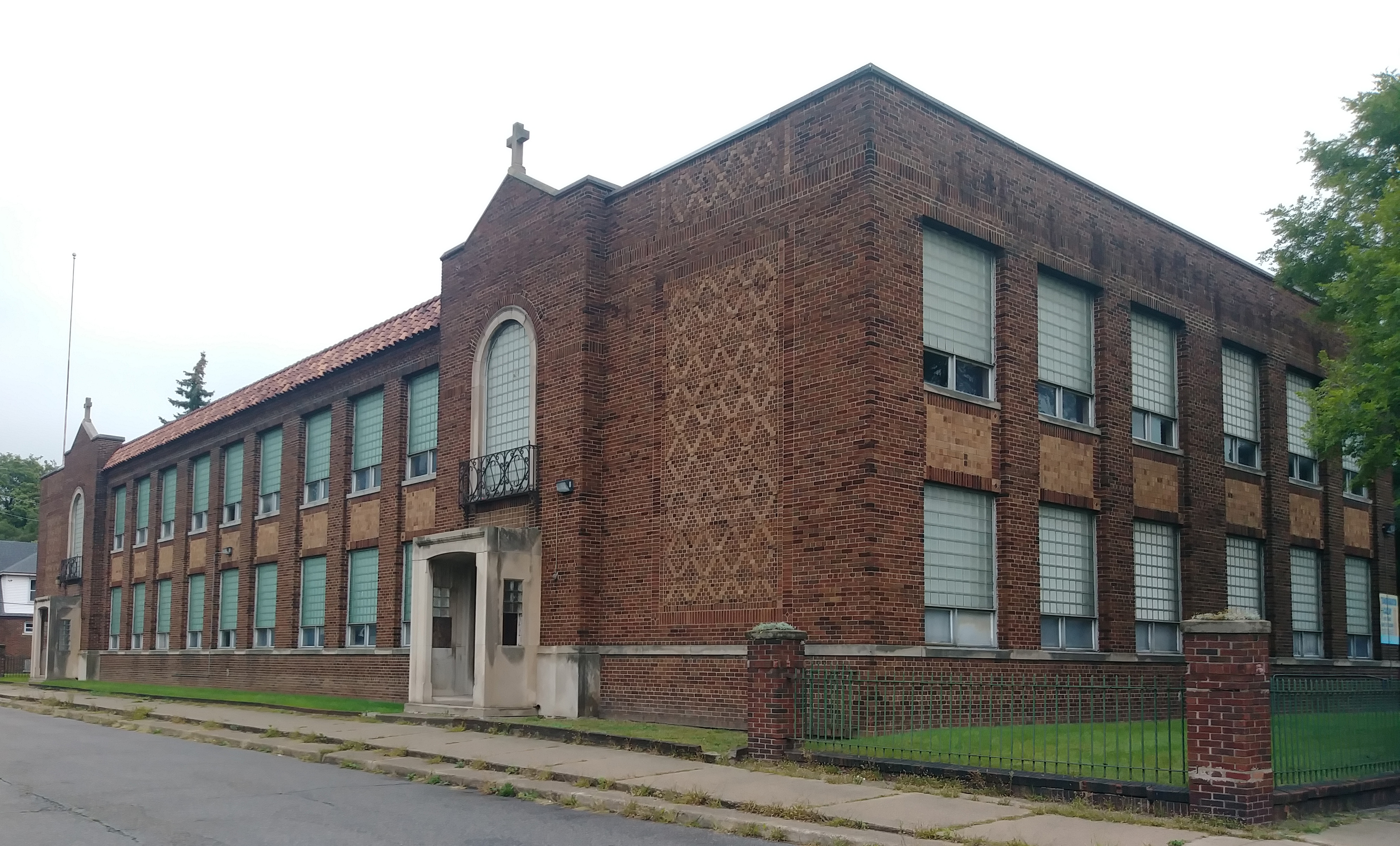
School

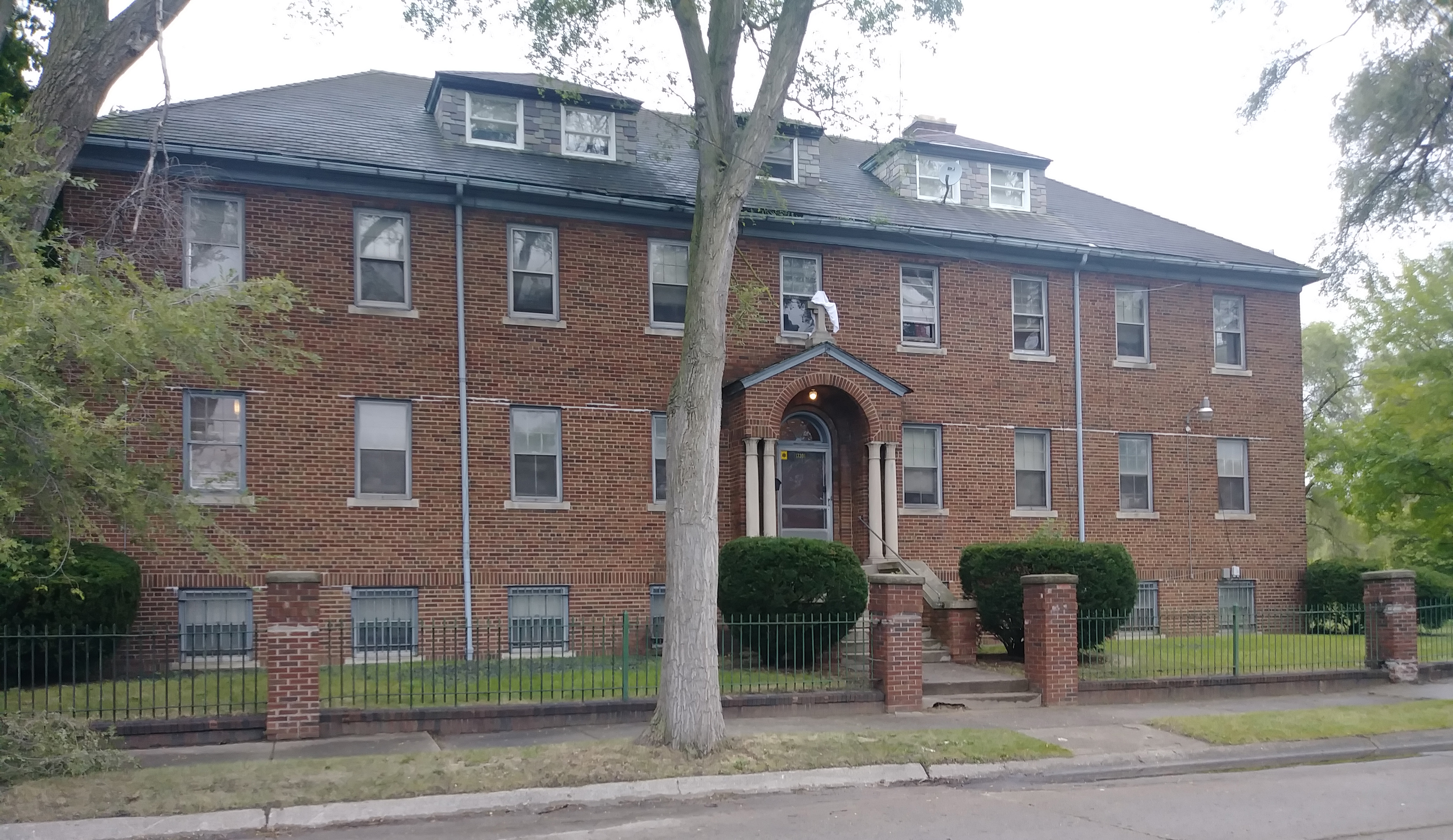
Former Convent

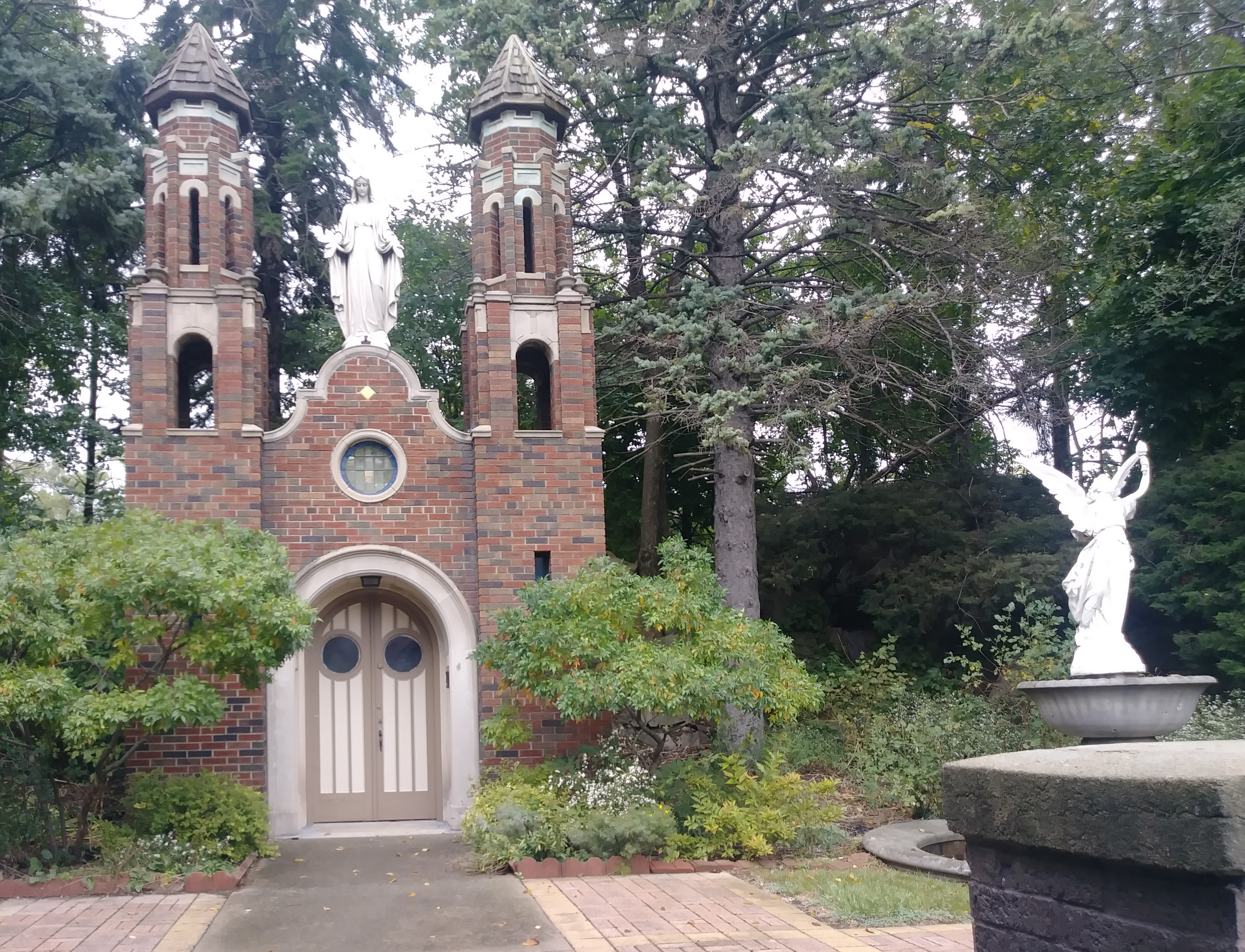
Grotto
