= Samuel D. Holcomb School =

NHRP structure in Michigan

- U.S. National Register of Historic Places
- Interactive map
- Location: 18100 Bentler St. Detroit, Michigan
- Coordinates: 42°25′17″N 83°15′10″W
- Built: 1925
- Built by: Raymond Carey
- Architect: Verner, Wihelm and Molby
- Architectural style: Collegiate Gothic
- MPS: Public Schools of Detroit MPS
- NRHP reference No.: 100009147
- Added to NRHP: July 21, 2023

The Samuel D. Holcomb School, or simply the Holcomb School, is a former school located at 18100 Bentler Street in Detroit.It was listed on the National Register of Historic Places in 2023.

== History ==
In the 1910s and 1920s, what was then the village of Redford experienced a boom in population. In response, the Redford Union Schools district constructed new buildings to house the influx of students. In 1925, the Redford Union Schools district hired the Detroit architectural firm of Verner, Wihelm and Molby to design this school to serve as the District No. 1 elementary school; it was completed in December 1925. The school was named in honor of Samuel D. Holcomb, a local physician. The original school contained thirteen classrooms. Although the school was built under the auspices of the Redford Union Schools district, Redford Union was almost immediately absorbed by the Detroit School District, and Holcomb opened the 1926/27 school year as a Detroit public school.

The area around the school continued to grow, and an addition to the school was completed in 1929, containing six more classrooms as well as a gymnasium and lunchroom. In 1946, a second addition was constructed, containing five more classrooms, an auditorium, a shop, and additional bathrooms.

The school continued to serve the neighborhood until declining enrollment forced its closure in 2010. It has since remained vacant.

== Description ==
The Holcomb School is a single-story, Collegiate Gothic structure constructed from red brick with limestone trim. The school has a rectangular footprint with two interior courtyards, like a figure eight. The facade along the main street has a side gable roof covered with asphalt shingles; the remainder of the building has a flat roof. The main facade is split into three sections. The central section is taller and deeper than the wings to each side. Tall brick gable ends divide the central section from the wings. The center section has two symmetrical projecting bays flanked by shallow projecting entryways.
