= Millwood Apartments =

- U.S. National Register of Historic Places
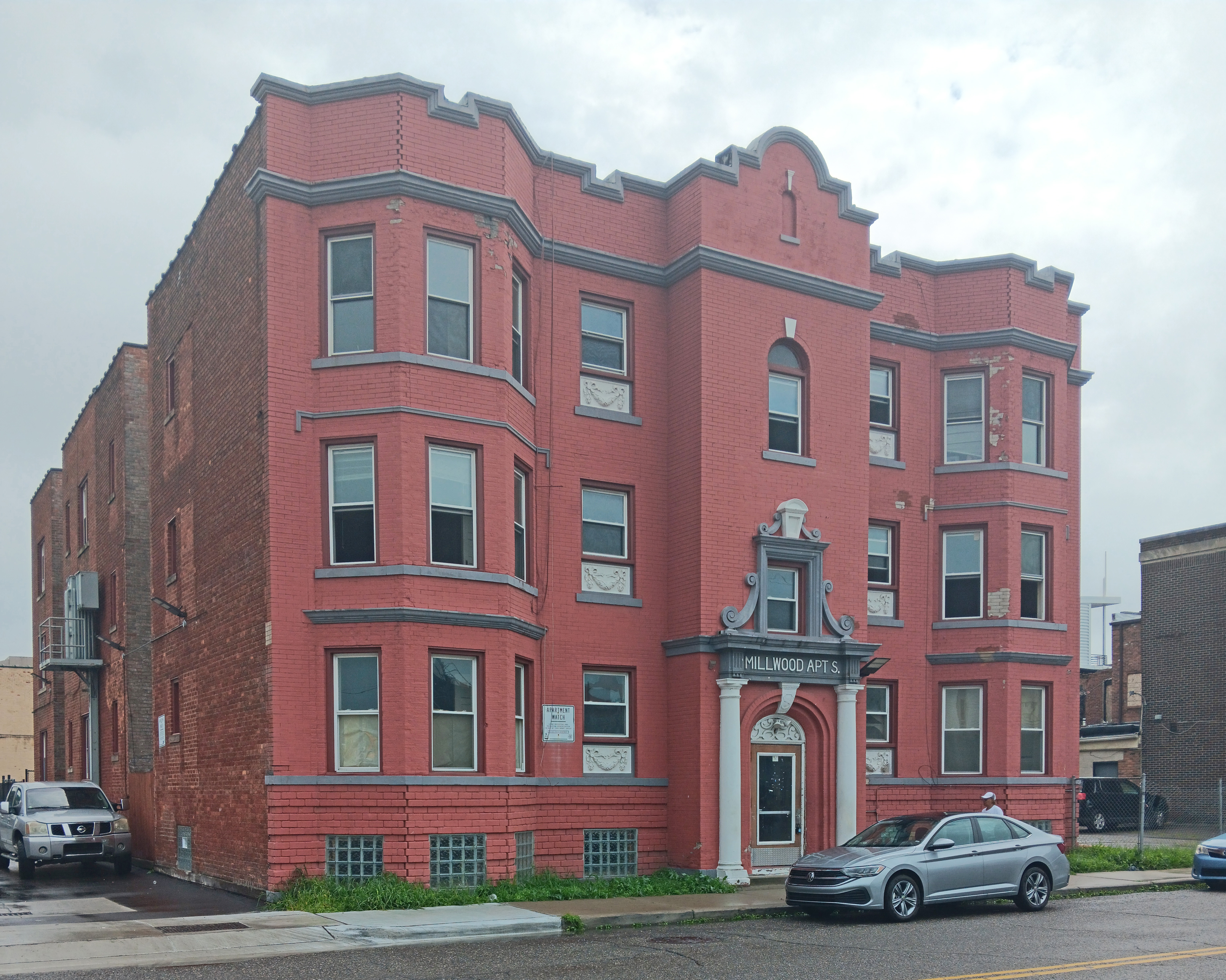
- Millwood Apartments, 2024
- Interactive map
- Location: 36 East Milwaukee St. Detroit, Michigan
- Coordinates: 42°22′9″N 83°4′18″W
- Built: 1904
- Architect: Raseman & Fisher
- Architectural style: Classical Revival
- MPS: Apartment Buildings in Detroit, Michigan, 1892-1970 MPS
- NRHP reference No.: 100010751
- Added to NRHP: August 21,2024

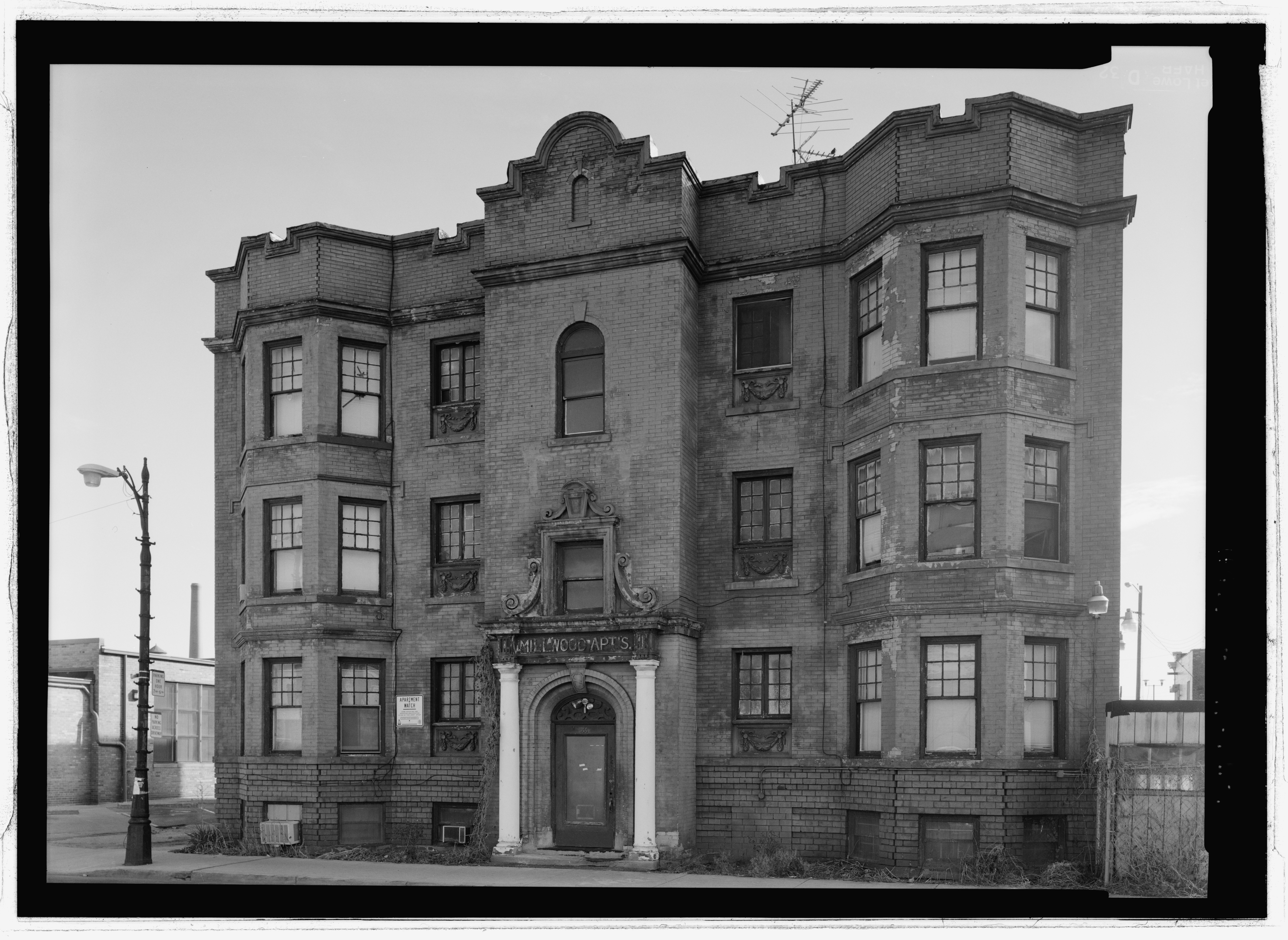
Millwood Apartments, 2003

Millwood Apartments is an apartment building located at 36 East Milwaukee Street in Detroit, Michigan. It was listed on the National Register of Historic Places in 2023.

== History ==
In 1901, Isaac and Rachel Applebaum purchased a plot of land along Milwaukee near Woodward. Issac was a general railway supply manufacturer, but retired to invest in real estate. He quickly constructed a commercial building at the corner of Milwaukee and Woodward. In 1904, he hired Detroit architects Raseman & Fisher to design a small apartment building, then known as the Ray Apartments. The newly opened building had a doctor's office in the basement and averaged five or six tenants on the residential floors.

In 1909, Isaac Applebaum sold the building to Abraham Cohen, a prominent hotel owner. In 1922, Cohen constructed a large addition on the rear of the building, increasing the number of apartments to thirty. When the addition was completed in 1923, Cohen changed the building name to the Millwood Apartments. Cohen sold the building in 1928.

== Description ==
Millwood Apartments is a three-story rectangular plan apartment building sitting on a raised basement. It has a concrete foundation and a flat roof. The building is constructed of gray and red brick with limestone trim. The front façade is symmetrical and divided into five bays. The outer bays contain the projections extending from the basement up to the roof. The center bay contains a recessed entrance within a rounded archway. Two limestone Doric columns flank the entry, and a semi-circular relief panel above mimics a fanlight.
