= United States Postal Service Roosevelt Park Station =

- U.S. National Register of Historic Places
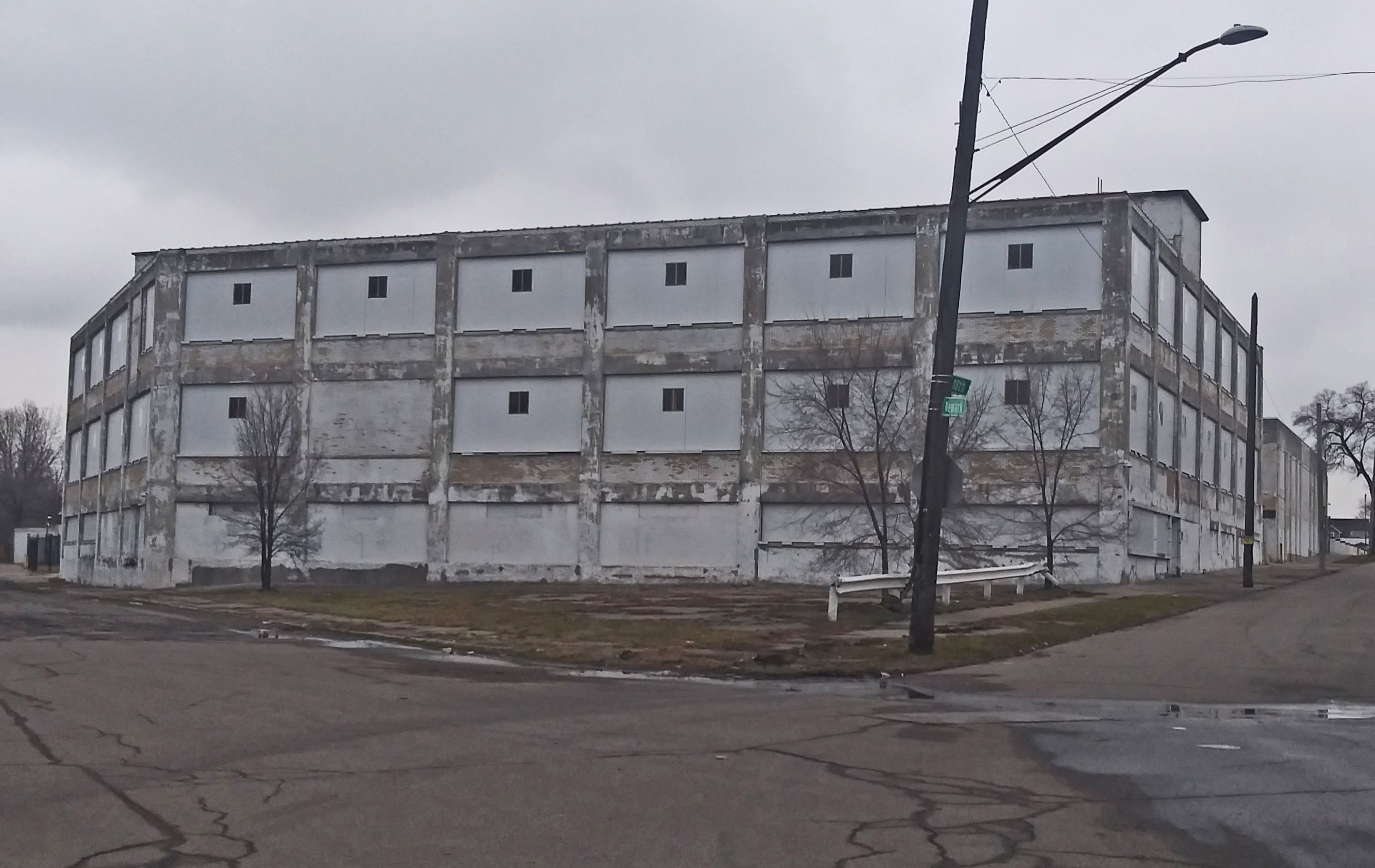
- North building, seen from the northwest
- Interactive map
- Location: 1800 18th St. Detroit, Michigan
- Coordinates: 42°19′38″N 83°4′42″W
- Built: 1923
- Built by: Everett Winters Co.
- Architectural style: Commercial style
- NRHP reference No.: 100005983
- Added to NRHP: December 23, 2020

The United States Postal Service Roosevelt Park Station is a former United States Post Office located at 1800 18th Street in Detroit, Michigan. It was listed on the National Register of Historic Places in 2020.

== History ==
Between 1910 and 1920, Detroit's population more than doubled. By 1922, plans were in the works to construct a new post office facility. Originally conceived as a post office and office building, by 1923 the plan had evolved to become a parcel post station to be erected in the vicinity of Michigan Central Station. By late that year, funds were allocated and a developer, Raymond D. Brown of Indianapolis, was chosen. Brown began construction in late 1923, and the postal service agreed to lease the building from him for $20,000 per year.

The building opened in 1924, but did not solve the parcel post delivery problem in Detroit. In 1925, additional parcels were obtained and construction began on another building, connected to the original. However, Detroit continued to grow, and in 1936 a new, larger Roosevelt Post Office Station was constructed on 14th Street. The Post Office moved into the new building that year, but continued to use the original Roosevelt Park Station as a garage through 1939.

In 1948, Frederic B. Stevens Inc., a metal plating and fabricating firm, moved into the original Roosevelt Park Station. At a later point, the Chope-Stevens Paper Company occupied the North Building, while Frederic B. Stevens occupied the South Building. In 1984, the APAC Paper and Packaging Company purchased the building. They used it until 2013, when the company moved to Allen Park, Michigan. The building was sold to Galapagos Art Space, but it was never utilized and became vacant. The building was purchased in 2019 by Dan Gilbert's Bedrock Detroit.

== Description ==
The United States Postal Service Roosevelt Park Station occupies the northern part of a city block between 17th and 18th Streets, south of Newark Street and the former Michigan Central (now Canadian Pacific Railway) railroad tracks. The structure consists of two sections: a northern building constructed in 1923-1924 and a southern building constructed in 1925. The two buildings are constructed in the Commercial Brick style, with a cast-in-place concrete frame, and floor and roof slabs. The two buildings are connected on the eastern side.

The northern building is a pentagon-shaped structure three stories tall, with sides measuring approximately 138 feet (north) by 112 feet (northeast) by 138 feet (west) by 66 feet (east) by 223 feet (south). The building is faced in yellow brick, which has been painted white. Large window openings with stone sills are in every level; the first floor windows have been infilled, while the upper two stories retain large five-over-six steel multipaned windows. A pedestrian entry is located on the west side.

The southern building is rectangular and two stories tall, measuring 223 feet (north-south) by 132 feet (east-west). The south façade is made of structural concrete and terra cotta block. The eastern façade contains three large freight openings for truck loading. Most of the building has been painted white.
