= West Side Dom Polski =

- U.S. National Register of Historic Places
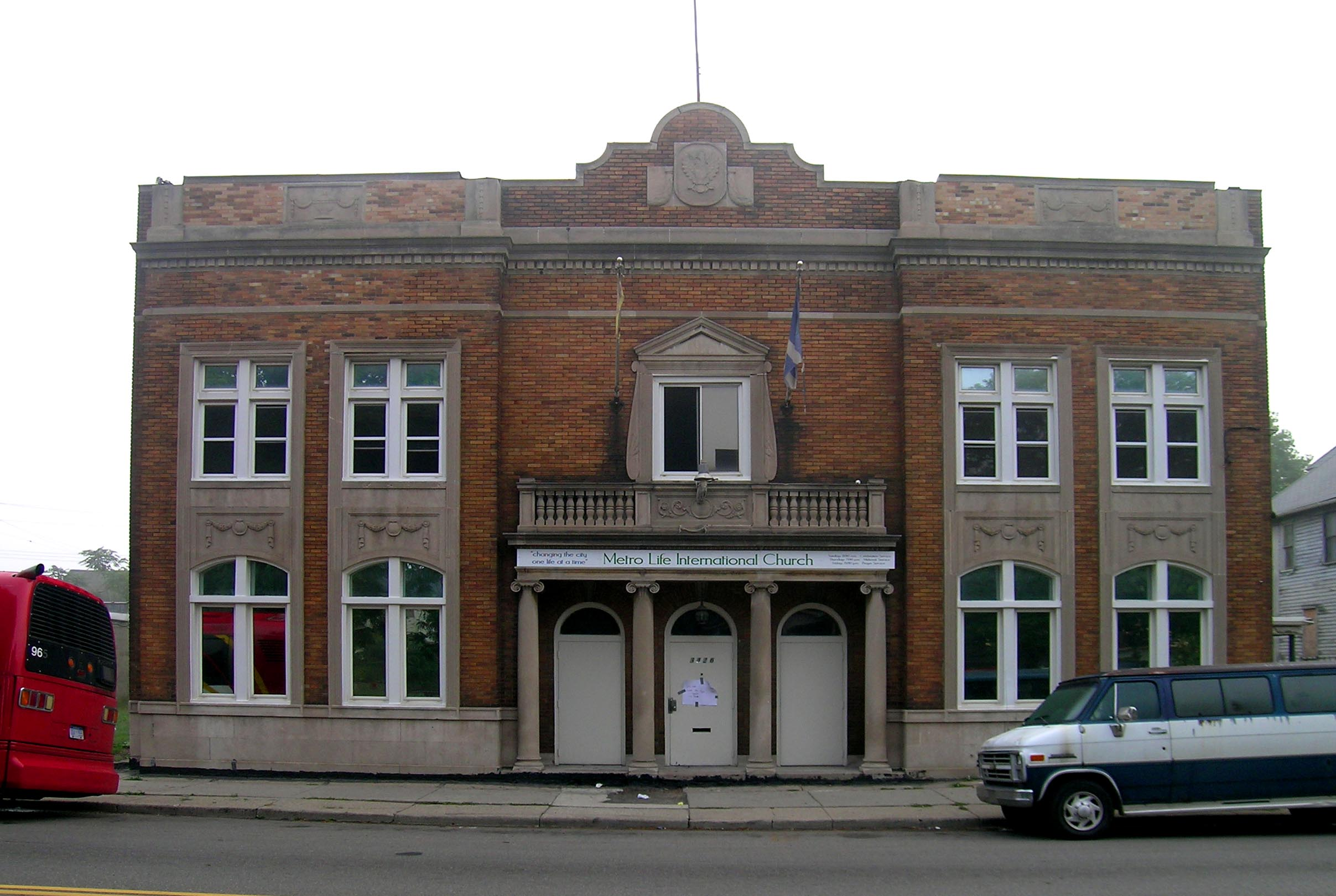
- Interactive map
- Location: 3426 Junction Street; Detroit, Michigan
- Coordinates: 42°19′50″N 83°6′38″W
- Built: 1916
- Architect: Joseph Julius Gwizdowski
- NRHP reference No.: 06001332
- Added to NRHP: February 1, 2007

The West Side Dom Polski is a meeting hall and social club located at 3426 Junction Street in Detroit, Michigan. The building was listed on the National Register of Historic Places in 2007. It is now the Metro Life International Church.

== History ==
In the 1870s, Polish immigrants began settling on the west side of Detroit. As the population grew, several Polish Catholic parishes were established, including St. Casimir (in 1882), St. Francis of Assisi (in 1889), St. Hedwig (in 1903), Assumption of the Blessed Virgin Mary (in 1911), and Our Lady Queen of Angels (in 1915). As in many other Polish-American neighborhoods, plans were made to establish a social and meeting hall called Dom Polski (Polish home).

On the West side of Detroit, these plans were developed in 1913 by two Polish social organizations, Lodge 649 of the St. Isadore Society and Lodge 1009 of the St. Cecila Society. Land for the Dom Polski was obtained, and the societies commissioned architect Joseph Julius Gwizdowski to design the building. The structure's first cornerstone was laid on July 5, 1917. However, the construction soon ran into financial difficulties, and the building was not completed until 1925.

When Poles moved from the west side neighborhood, many of the Polish Roman Catholic parishes were closed, and the Dom Polski changed hands. It has recently been used to house the Metro Life International Church and Scotty's Food and Cookies.

As of March 2008 it was up for sale; the property was described as being 20,181 square feet (1,874.9 m^{2}), including a cat room, auditorium with seating for 400, bar, dance studio, basement kitchen, and 6-8 bathrooms.
