= Checker Cab Building (Detroit) =

Garage and office building in Detroit

- Checker Cab Taxi Garage and Office Building
- U.S. National Register of Historic Places
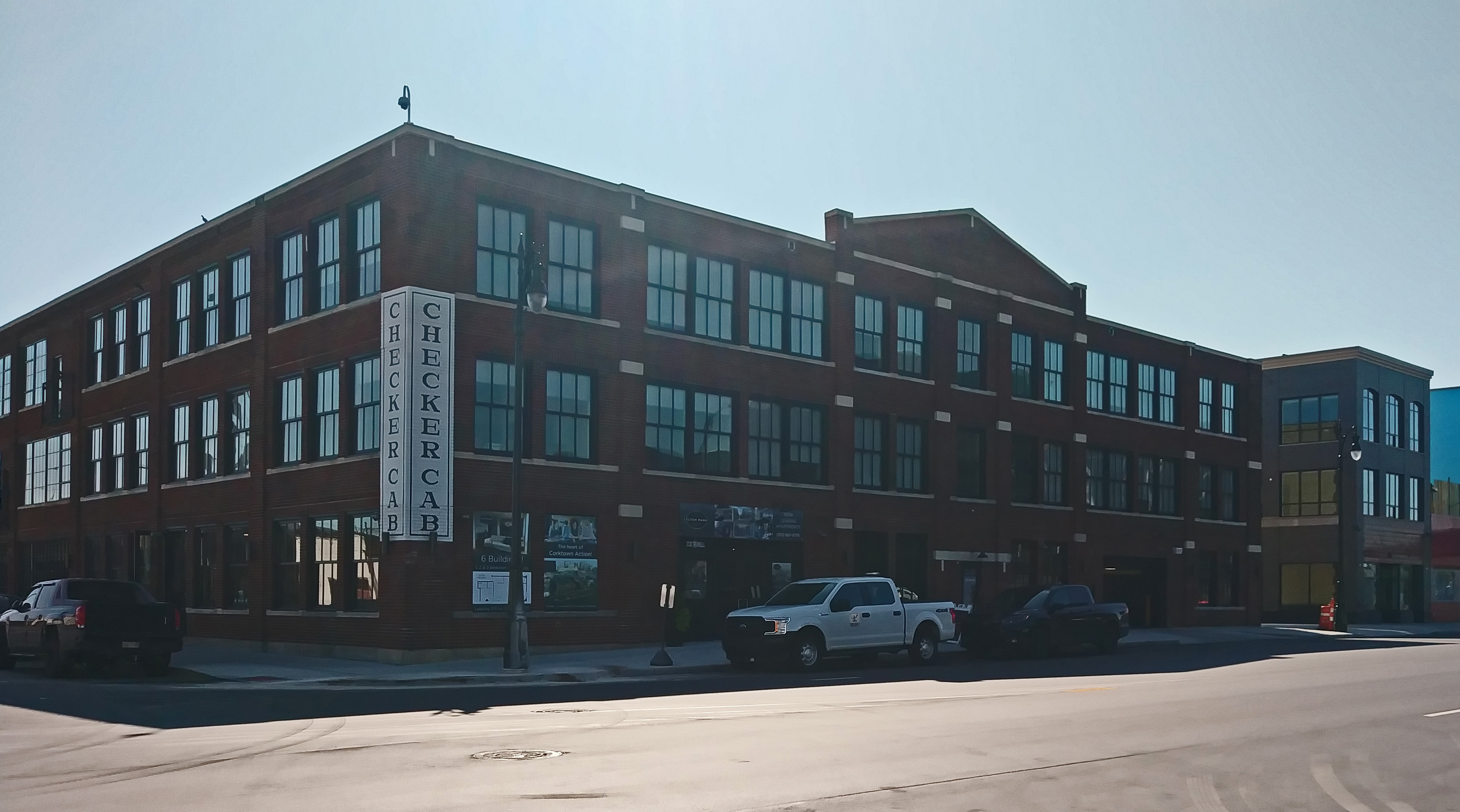
- Interactive map
- Location: 2128 Trumbull Ave. Detroit, Michigan
- Coordinates: 42°19′57″N 83°4′3″W
- Area: less than one acre
- Built: 1927
- Architect: Wisconsin Bridge and Iron Company
- Architectural style: Early 20th century commercial brick
- NRHP reference No.: 100004226
- Added to NRHP: July 24, 2019

The Checker Cab Building was built as a garage and office building located at 2128 Trumbull Avenue in Detroit, Michigan. It was listed on the National Register of Historic Places in 2019. The building has been rehabilitated into residences, and is now part of the Elton Park lofts.

== History ==
Automobile taxis were first introduced in Detroit in the late 19th century. By the 1910s, automobile taxis were commonplace, with stiff competition between organized taxi companies and independent operators. In 1921, some of Detroit's independent taxicab operators organized into a confederation soon named the "Checker Taxicab Service," and later the "Checker Cab Company." Checker undercut its competition on prices and allowed owner-operators to join, and by 1922 ran 85 cabs, increasing to 240 in 1924. In 1923, Checker Cab moved into new offices in the General Motors Building.

One of Checker's largest rivals, the Detroit Cab Company, was organized in 1910 as the Detroit Garage Company (later the Detroit Taxicab and Transfer Company). By the early 1920s, the company was the largest taxicab company in Detroit. By 1921, the company had purchased a yard at the corner of Trumbull and Plum, where it built several single-story buildings, including a garage and office. In 1927, Detroit Cab constructed a new, multi-story garage and office building. The new building was designed by the Detroit branch of the Wisconsin Bridge and Iron Company.

In 1929, the Checker Cab Company purchased the Detroit Cab Company, and by 1931 had moved its headquarters out of the General Motors Building and into the Trumbull facility. The Great Depression caused many of Checker's rivals to go out of business, and by the late 1930s, most of the registered cabs in the city were Checker's. The company did well in the postwar years, peaking along with Detroit's explosive growth, to 900 cabs in 1960, when Detroit's population was 2 million. As the city struggled from the late 1960s to the 1980s, Checkers numbers fell accordingly, by approximately 50%. However, it rebounded later and remains the largest cab company in Michigan into the present day. Checker remained in the building on Trumbull until 2016 when it sold the building for redevelopment into loft space. The building was refurbished as part of the Elton Park development in 2018.

== Description ==
The Checker Cab Building is a three-story, flat-roofed commercial-style brick building measuring 292 by 124 feet. It has a steel and concrete frame and is faced with red-brown brick and cast concrete. The main facade is symmetrical, seven bays wide. The center bay is narrow, containing a single window with a pedestrian door on the first floor. The two flanking bays have paired windows; above these three bays is a gabled parapet. The remaining bays on each side are four- and two-window bays. The four-window bays contain garage doors on the first-floor level. The bays are divided by brick piers trimmed with flat cast concrete bands at each floor level. The windows have cast concrete sills and soldier course brick lintels.

The Plum Street facade is thirteen bays long, with red-brown brick like the main facade. The three bays nearest Trumbull contain tripled double-hung windows; the remainder contains steel factory windows.
