= St. Albertus Roman Catholic Church =

Historic church in Michigan, United States

- U.S. National Register of Historic Places
- Michigan State Historic Site
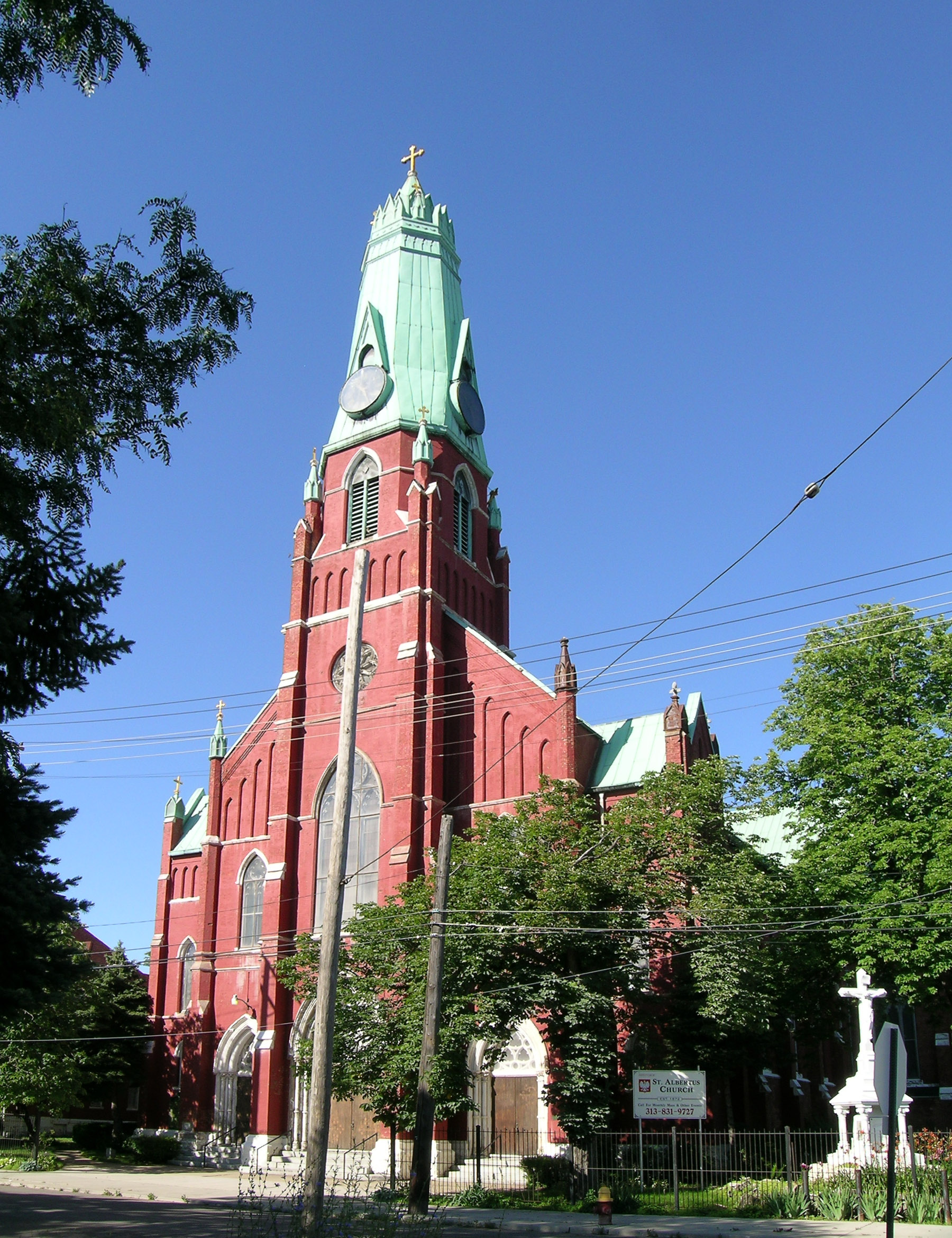
- St. Albertus façade
- Interactive map
- Location: 4231 St. Aubin Street; Detroit, Michigan
- Coordinates: 42°21′36″N 83°2′31″W
- Built: 1885
- Architect: Henry Engelbert
- Architectural style: Polish Cathedral style, Gothic Revival
- NRHP reference No.: 78001522

Significant dates
- Added to NRHP: January 18, 1978
- Designated MSHS: July 26, 1974

St. Albertus Roman Catholic Church is in the Forest Park neighborhood of Detroit, Michigan. It was designated a Michigan State Historic Site in 1974 and listed on the National Register of Historic Places in 1978.

== History ==
The rise of Detroit brought a number of Polish immigrants into the city in the 19th century; by the mid-1850s, the number of Polish families who had settled in the city was significant. These Polish immigrants were primarily from the Prussian-controlled sections of the partitioned Poland, and naturally settled in and near the German-speaking sections of Detroit. They were joined, after the American Civil War, by Kashubian immigrants from what is now northwestern Poland. Many of these Poles and Kashubians first attended St. Joseph's, which was at the time a German-speaking church. However, the Polish congregants were dissatisfied, and agitated for a Polish church.

In 1870, aided by Father Simon Wieczorek, the Poles took steps to organize their own parish. They organized the St. Stanislaus Kostka Society and, with the blessing then-administrator Bishop Caspar Borgess, began to collect funds to build a church. In 1871, St. Albertus Parish was organized with three hundred or so Polish families. That same year, the parish purchased a plot of land, 100 feet wide and 270 feet deep, on the western side of St. Aubin Avenue and what is now East Canfield Street. They hired architect John Wiesenhoffèr, and construction of a frame church began in 1872.

The church was dedicated to St. Wojciech; early pastors borrowed the erroneous Latin equivalent Adalbertus, which is St. Albertus or St. Albert in English. The establishment of St. Albertus led to an influx of Poles into the immediate neighborhood in order to be close to the church. This influx resulted in Detroit's first Polish neighborhood, known among Detroiters as "Poletown".

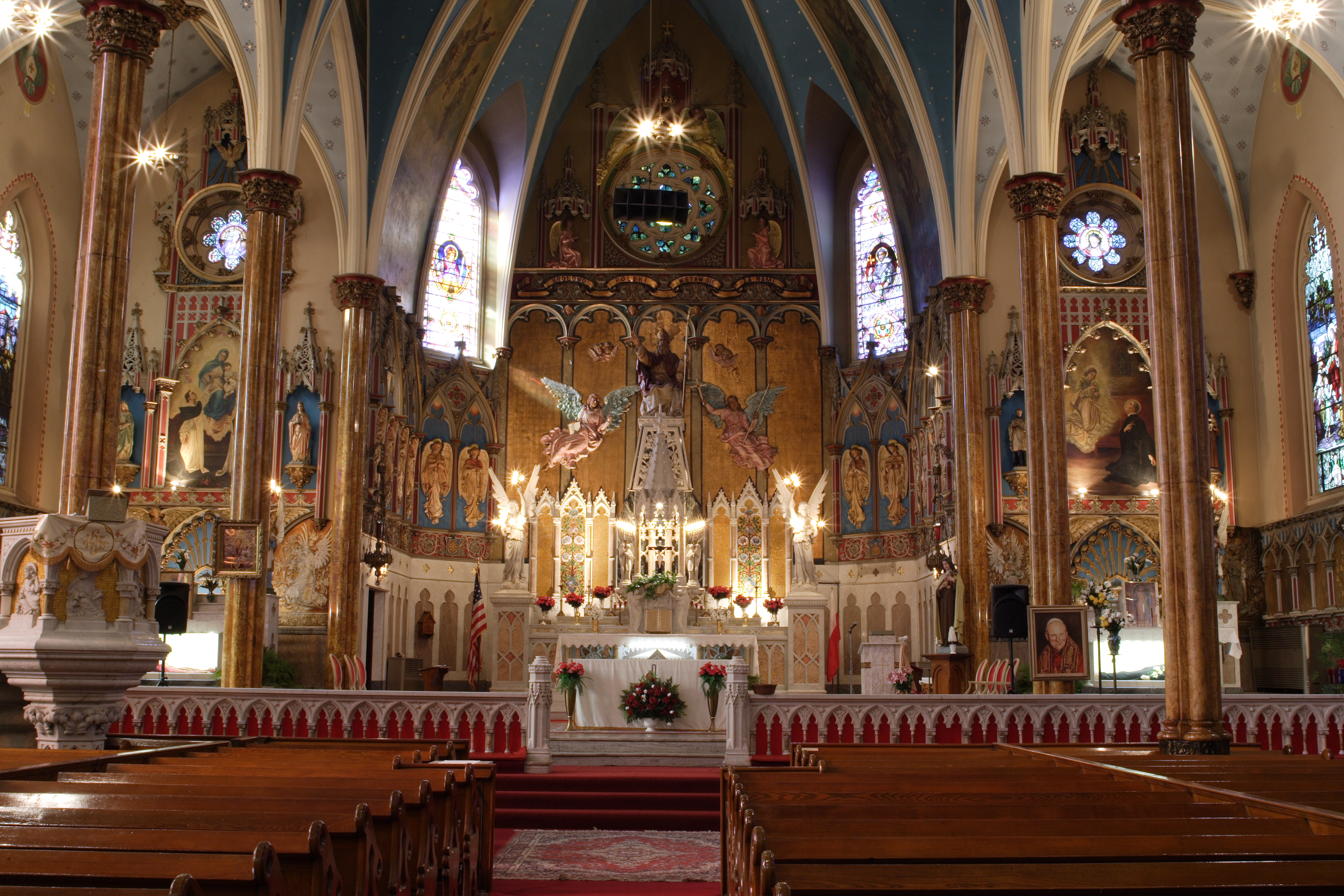
Interior of St. Albertus Catholic Church

St. Albertus went through four pastors until, in 1882, the charismatic Father Dominic Hippolytus Kolasinski was appointed to the post. Appealing to his parishioners' national pride, he urged the construction of a larger church. The parish contracted architect Henry Engelbert to design a church to seat 2500 people, and the Spitzely Brothers of Detroit to build it for a cost of $61,000. Construction began in 1883, and the church was dedicated on July 4, 1885. At the time, St. Albertus was the largest Catholic church in Michigan, and was the first in the City of Detroit to feature steam heat and electrical lighting.

Unfortunately, Kolasinski was a very controversial priest, and in November 1885 the parish became factionalized which resulted in his suspension. Kolasinski initially refused to leave his post, appealing his suspension to the bishop. However, pressure was brought to bear, and Kolasinski eventually left Detroit for a pastorate in the Dakota Territory.

Kolasinski's followers, however, remained estranged from the other St. Albertus congregants, and established their own church school. When John Samuel Foley became Bishop of Detroit in 1888, Kolasinski returned to the city and established the Parish of the Sweetest Heart of Mary outside the jurisdiction of the Roman Catholic Diocese. Although subsequent years in the parish have been less tumultuous, St. Albertus is the mother church of more than 30 Polish Catholic churches, including Sweetest Heart of Mary, St. Josaphat, and St. Stanislaus.

A rectory building was constructed adjacent to the church in 1891 and a school was built immediately behind the church in 1917, replacing two earlier school buildings. The parish was closed in 1990 as part of a reorganization by the Archdiocese of Detroit. In 1991, a group of parishioners formed The Polish American Historic Site Association (PAHSA) to maintain and preserve St. Albertus. The church still hosts monthly Masses in Polish, English, and Latin, and is open for tours and weddings.

Rev. John A. Lemke, who was born in Detroit on February 10, 1866, as the son of Prussian-Polish immigrants, was the first native-born Roman Catholic priest of Polish descent to be ordained in the United States. He was baptized at nearby St. Mary's Church and attended St. Albertus for his primary education.

== Description ==
St. Albertus is a brick building 200 ft (61 m) long and 70 ft (21 m) wide, with a spire originally 280 ft (85 m) tall. The original spire was shortened after being damaged in a windstorm on Good Friday of 1913.

Contrasting with the plain brick of the exterior, the interior of St. Albertus has an ornate Medieval flair. The altars, baptismal font, and the wainscot are made of patterned terra-cotta. The ceiling is ornately painted. Sixty-three pieces of painted plaster sculpture are within the church, and the windows are decorated with Medieval-style stained glass.

== See also ==
- History of the Polish Americans in Metro Detroit
- Archdiocese of Detroit
