= St. Joseph Oratory =

Historic church in Michigan, United States

- St. Joseph Shrine
- U.S. National Register of Historic Places
- U.S. Historic district
- Michigan State Historic Site
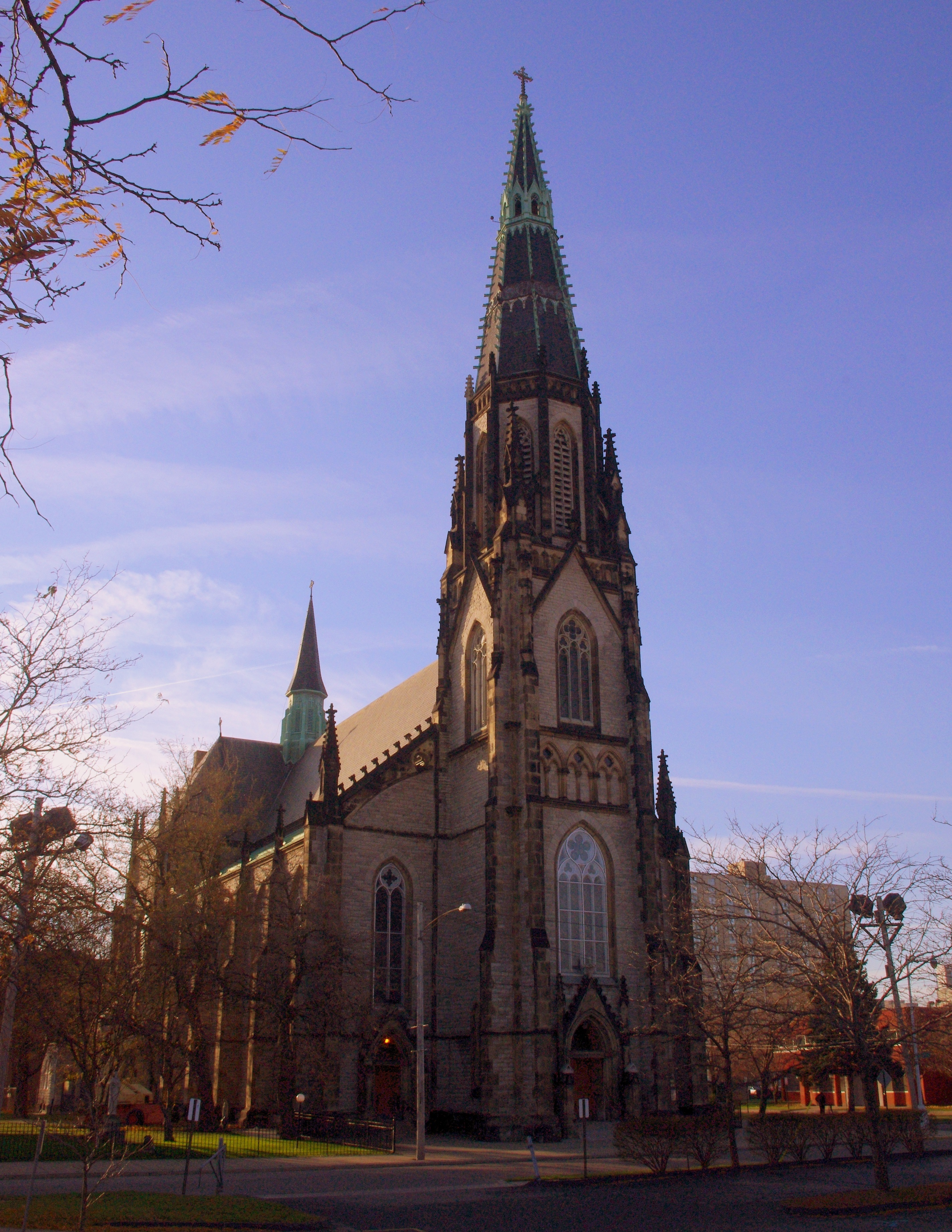
- Interactive map
- Location: 1828 Jay Street; Detroit, Michigan
- Coordinates: 42°20′43″N 83°2′8″W
- Built: 1870-1873; 153 years ago
- Architect: Francis G. Himpler; Donaldson and Meier
- Architectural style: Late Gothic Revival; German Hall Church
- NRHP reference No.: 72000670 (original); 91002013 (increase)

Significant dates
- Added to NRHP: December 08, 1972
- Boundary increase: January 28, 1992

St. Joseph Shrine (formerly St. Joseph Oratory and St. Joseph's Roman Catholic Church), founded in 1855, is a historic German Catholic church located at 1828 Jay Street in the Eastern Market–Lafayette Park neighborhood area just outside downtown Detroit, Michigan, on the city's central east side. The building was listed on the National Register of Historic Places in 1972, and deemed "of national importance" because of its stained glass. Three subsidiary buildings—the rectory, convent, and the Wermers House—were added to the listing in 1992. It is under the jurisdiction of the Archdiocese of Detroit, and presently a shrine dedicated to the celebration of the pre-Vatican II liturgy (the Tridentine Mass) under the care of the canons of the Institute of Christ the King Sovereign Priest.

== Architecture ==
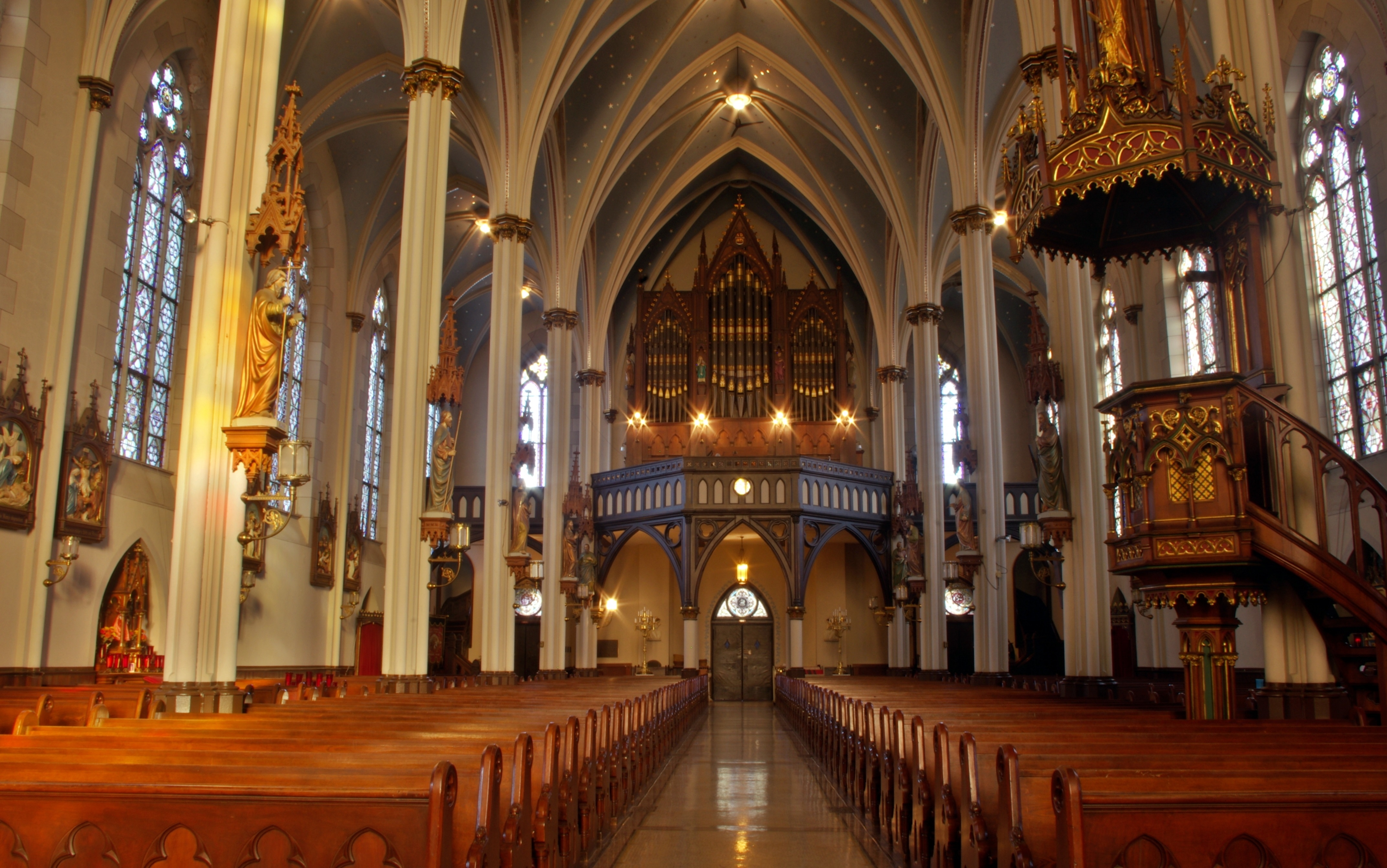
The rear of the church nave.

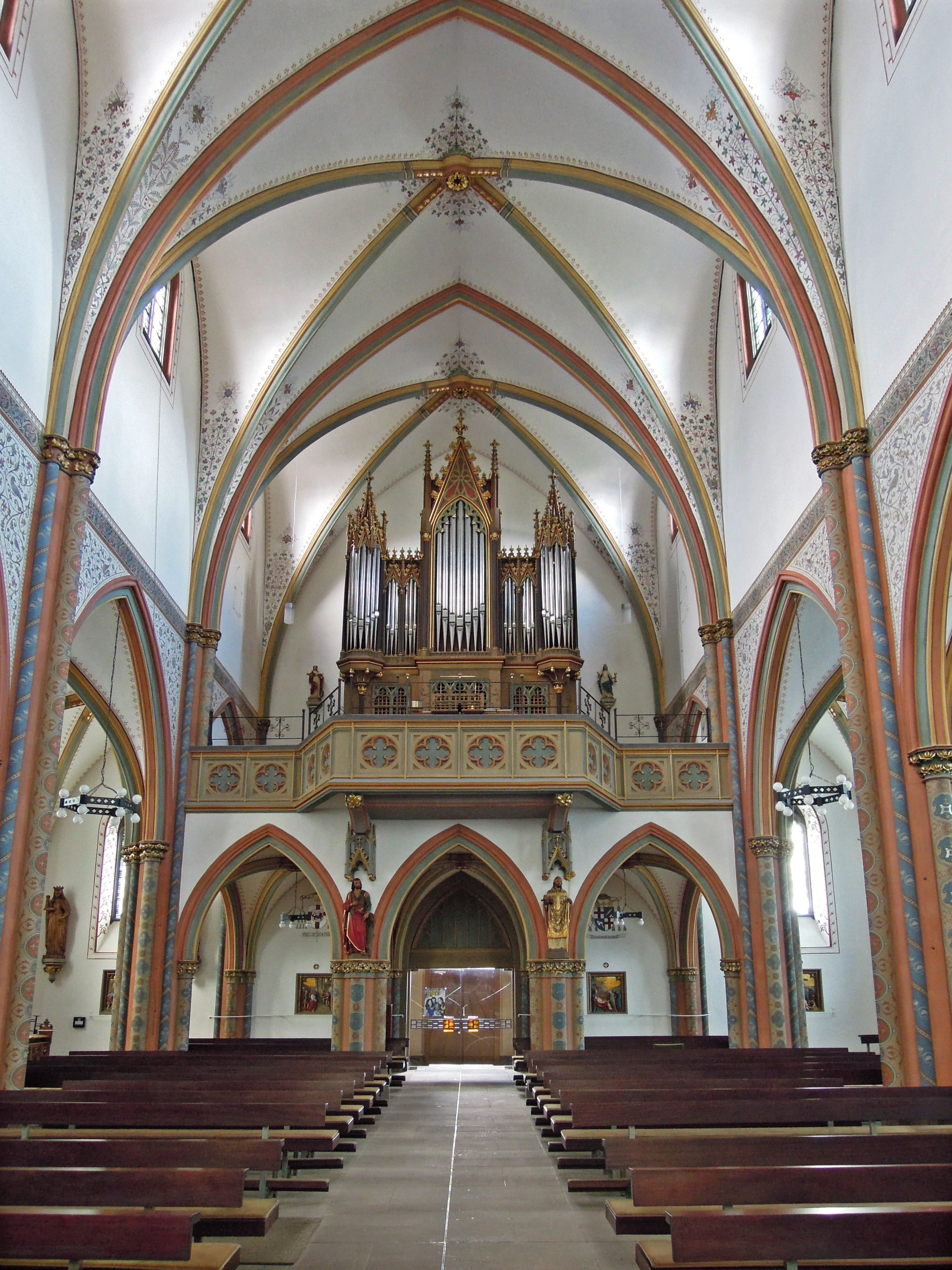
Wallerfangen, Church St. Katharina

The Gothic structure of the church, inspired by Himpler's church St. Katharina (1860-1863) in Wallerfangen (Saarland), had its cornerstone laid in 1870 and was dedicated in 1873, making it one of the oldest extant churches in Detroit. Francis G. Himpler, an Ottweiler (Germany)-born New York architect, designed the building which is considered one of the Midwest's best examples of Victorian Gothic architecture, especially so because the structure is effectively unaltered. The building is distinguished by its stained glass, notable in its intricate designs and wide usage. Also of note is the woodwork, statuary, and original high altar in the interior. St. Joseph Church was placed on the National Register of Historic Places in 1972; the buildings in the surrounding complex were added in 1992.

== Traditional worship ==
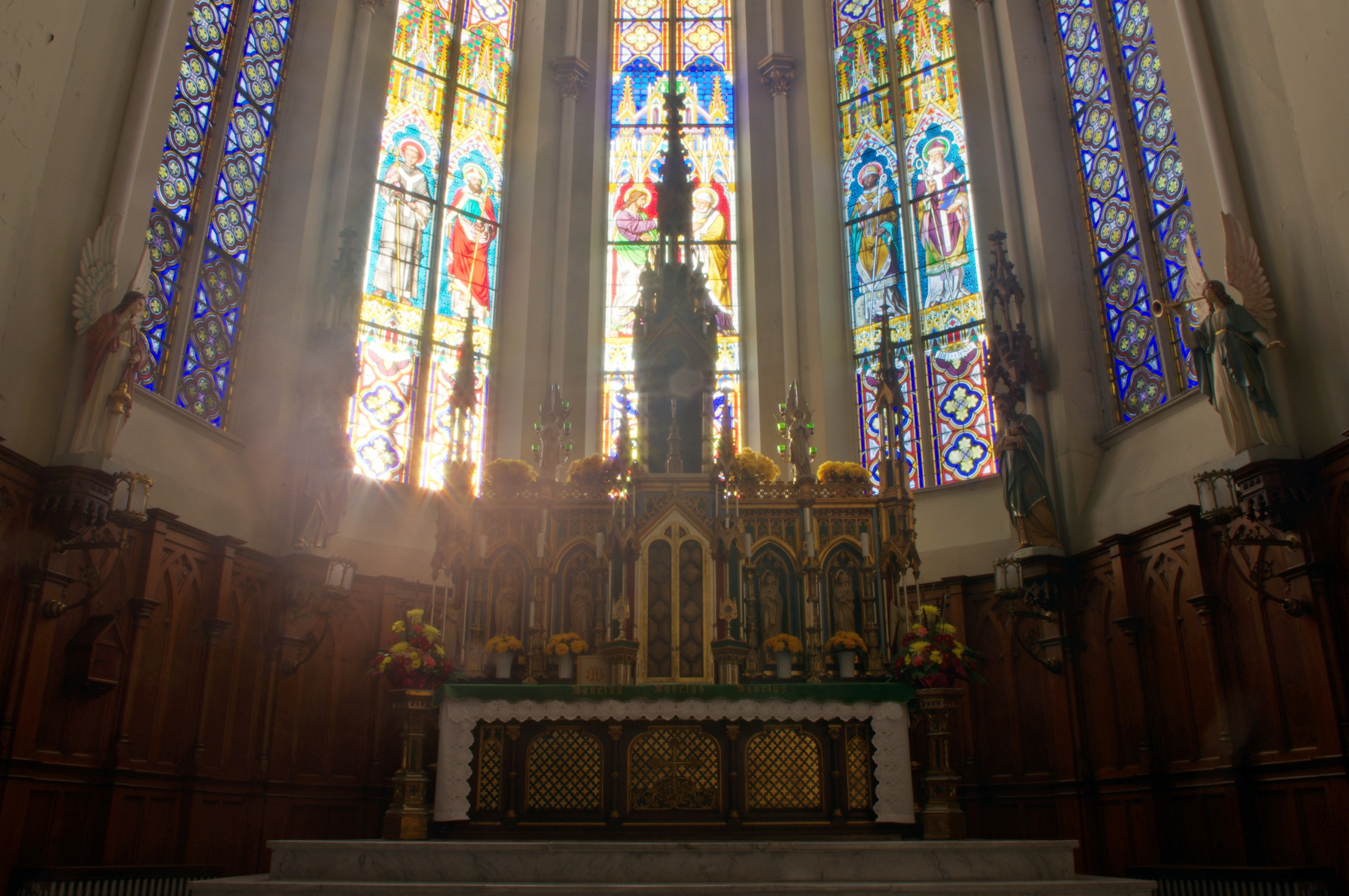
The high altar and tabernacle in St. Joseph Church.

In its time as a parish church, St. Joseph continued traditional worship throughout its history, maintaining the Latin language, alongside vernacular German and English, in its Novus Ordo Masses after the Second Vatican Council. Many Masses were celebrated ad orientem, with a free-standing altar available for priests who preferred it. In Fall 2007, after a 37-year absence, the parish reinstated the Latin Tridentine Mass, which was widely replaced when Pope Paul VI promulgated the Novus Ordo Mass in 1969.

The parish is known for its musical heritage, offering orchestral Masses composed by the likes of Haydn, Mozart, Schubert, and lesser known composers on certain Sundays and Holy Days, and maintaining traditional choir and organ music. The St. Joseph tracker organ is a powerful instrument in a fine acoustical space. Originally built by J. H. & C. S. Odell for the present Church structure in 1873, the organ was greatly altered around 1910 and again in the early 1940s. Having declined into unplayability, it was replaced for the celebration of the church building's centennial in 1973 by the organ builder William M. Worden, using many of the Odell pipes. It currently contains twenty-nine stops.

== Current status ==
On June 19, 2013, by a decree from Allen H. Vigneron, Archbishop of Detroit, the clustered parishes of St. Joseph, Sweetest Heart of Mary and St. Josaphat were merged to create the new Mother of Divine Mercy Parish.

On August 29, 2016, Archbishop Vigneron announced that effective October 2016, St. Joseph Church would be separated from Mother of Divine Mercy Parish to become St. Joseph Oratory under the care of the Institute of Christ the King Sovereign Priest and would be dedicated to the celebration of the traditional Latin Mass. The first Mass under the watch of the canons of the Institute was celebrated on October 16, 2016. The Reverend Canon Jean-Baptiste Commins currently serves as rector of the shrine. Previously on the verge of closing, after the Institute of Christ the King priests arrived, the parish has seen large growth, especially amongst young people and young families. In March 2020, Archbishop Vigneron granted the church the title of "shrine".

The church was featured in a 2022 article by The New York Times about the Latin Mass in the United States following Traditionis custodes, an apostolic letter issued by Pope Francis limiting the use of the traditional Latin Mass.

== Gallery ==
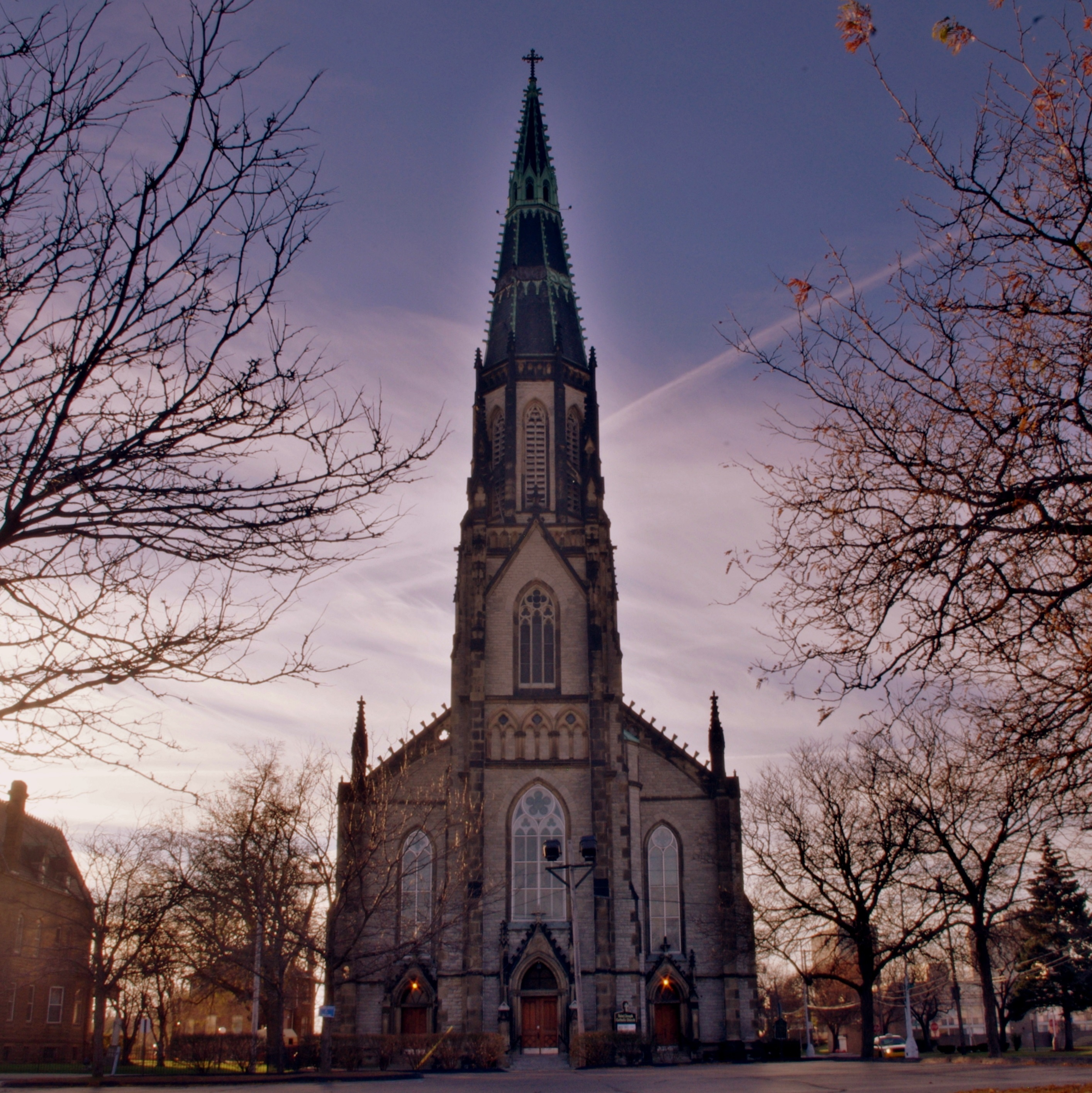
Façade of the church

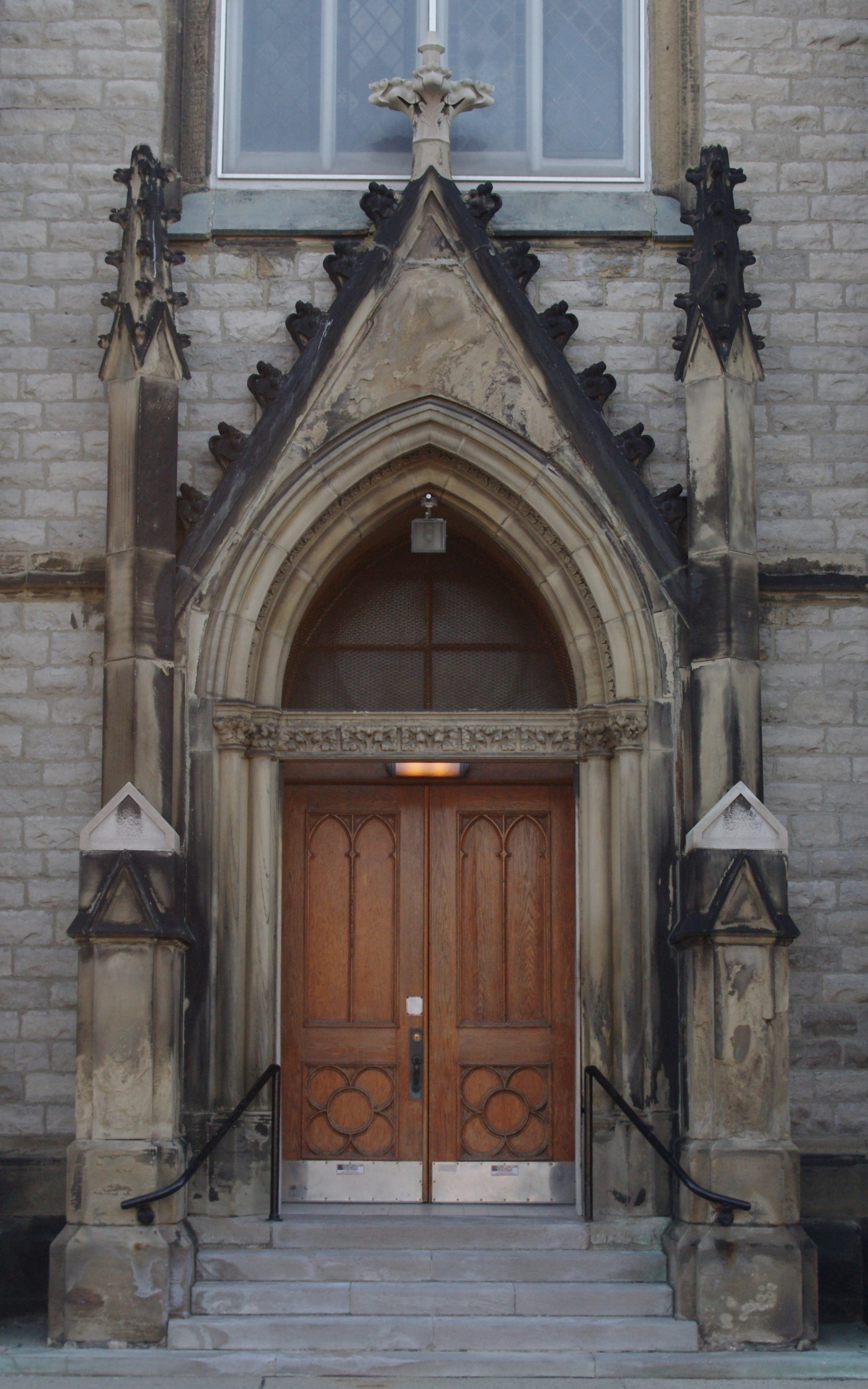
Portal

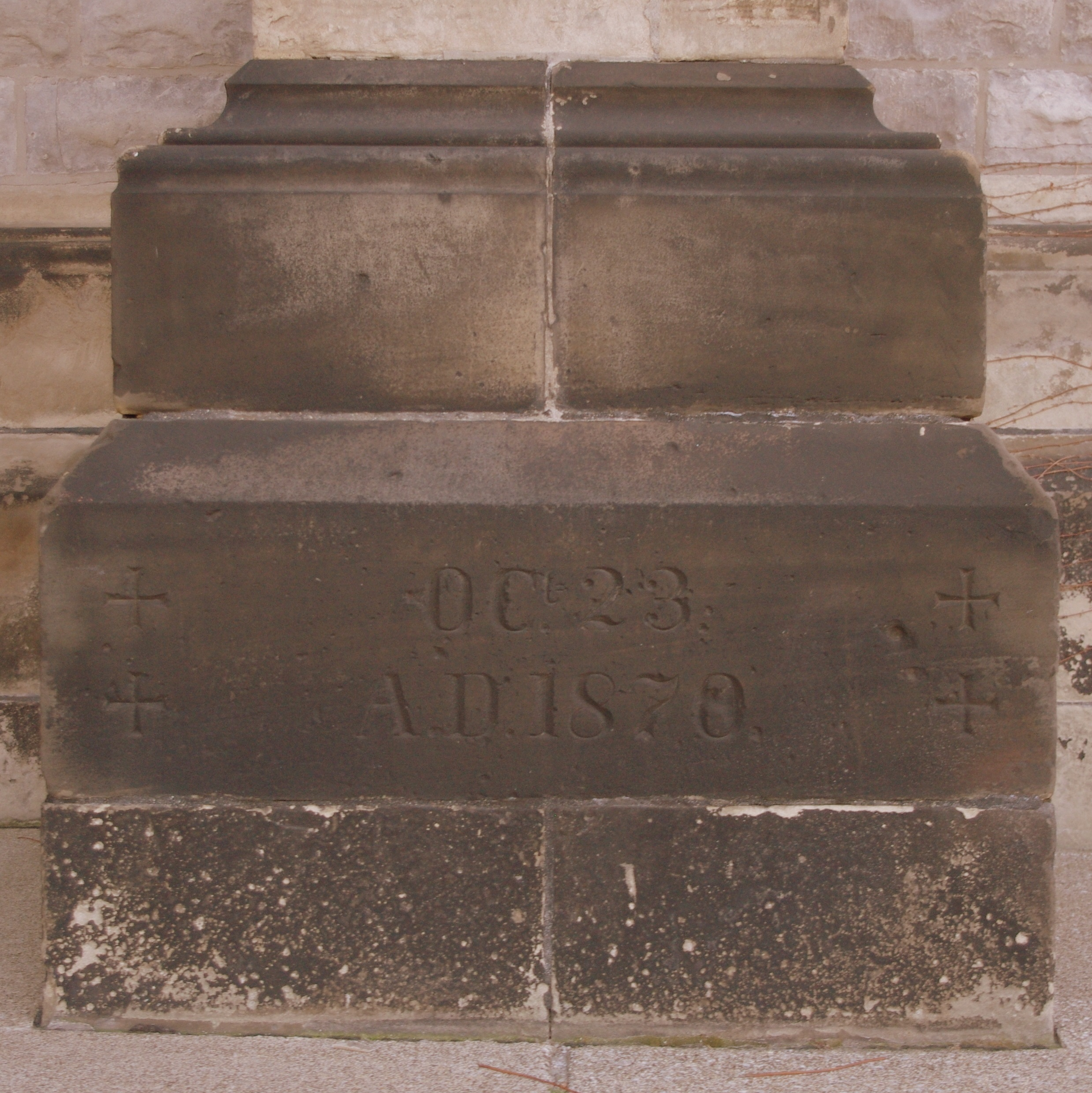
Cornerstone

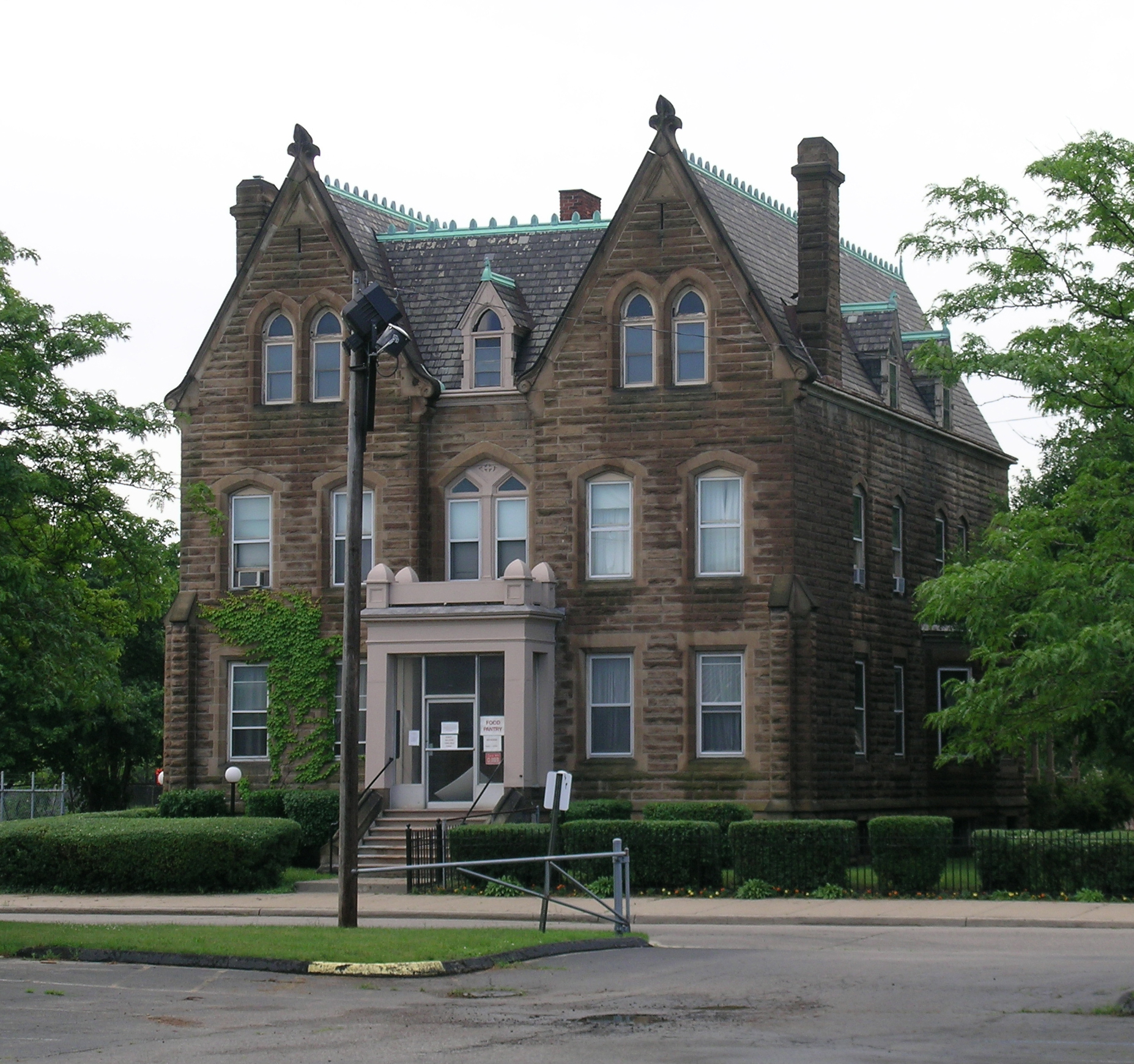
Parish rectory house next door to the church

== See also ==
- Archdiocese of Detroit
- Architecture of metropolitan Detroit
