= Eastern Market, Detroit =

- Eastern Market Historic District
- U.S. National Register of Historic Places
- U.S. Historic district
- Michigan State Historic Site
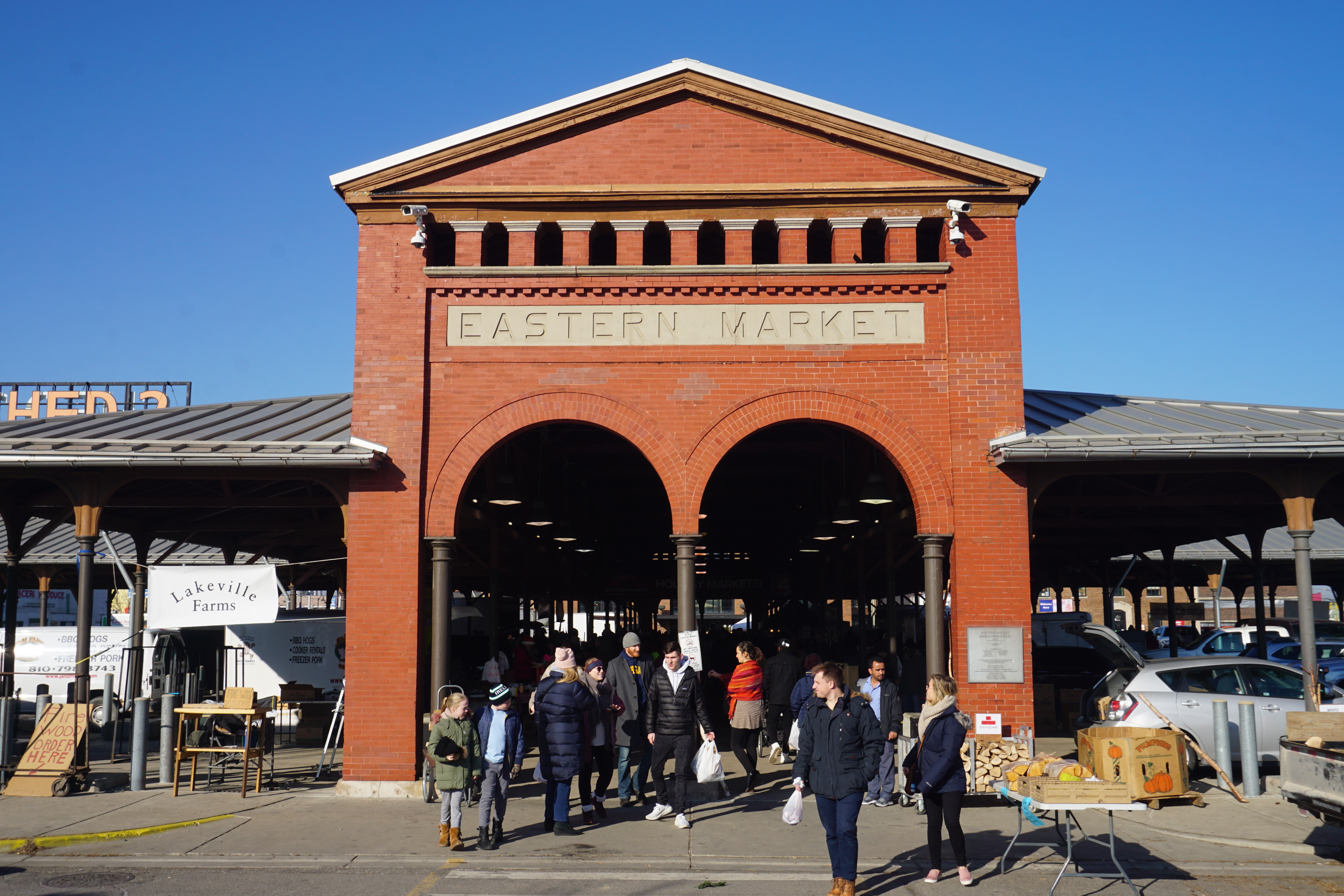
- Shed 2 at Eastern Market
- Interactive map
- Location: Detroit, Michigan, U.S.
- Coordinates: 42°20′44″N 83°2′35″W
- Architect: Smith, Hinchman & Grylls
- Architectural style: Early Commercial, Late Victorian
- NRHP reference No.: 78001518 (original); 06001330 (increase)

Significant dates
- Added to NRHP: November 29, 1978
- Boundary increase: February 1, 2007
- Designated MSHS: July 26, 1974

Eastern Market is a commercial district in Detroit, Michigan. It is located approximately one mile (1.6 km) northeast of the city's downtown and is bordered on the south by Gratiot Avenue, the north by Mack Avenue, the east by St. Aubin Street, and the west by Interstate 75 (I-75, Chrysler Freeway). Eastern Market is located on the city's central east side near St. Joseph Roman Catholic Church and the Lafayette Park neighborhood. The district was designated a Michigan State Historic Site in 1974 and listed on the National Register of Historic Places in 1978. The district's National Register boundary was increased in 2007.

The market was transferred from city management in 2006, and now operates through a public-private partnership with the Eastern Market Corporation. Eastern Market is the largest historic public market district in the United States, and the Eastern Market farmers' distribution center is the largest open-air flowerbed market in the United States. There are more than 150 businesses in the district, selling goods such as produce, meat, flowers, and specialty items. Before the COVID-19 pandemic, the market attracted over 45,000 visitors on peak days. Today, between 30,000 and 40,000 people shop at Eastern Market on a typical summer Saturday.

== History ==
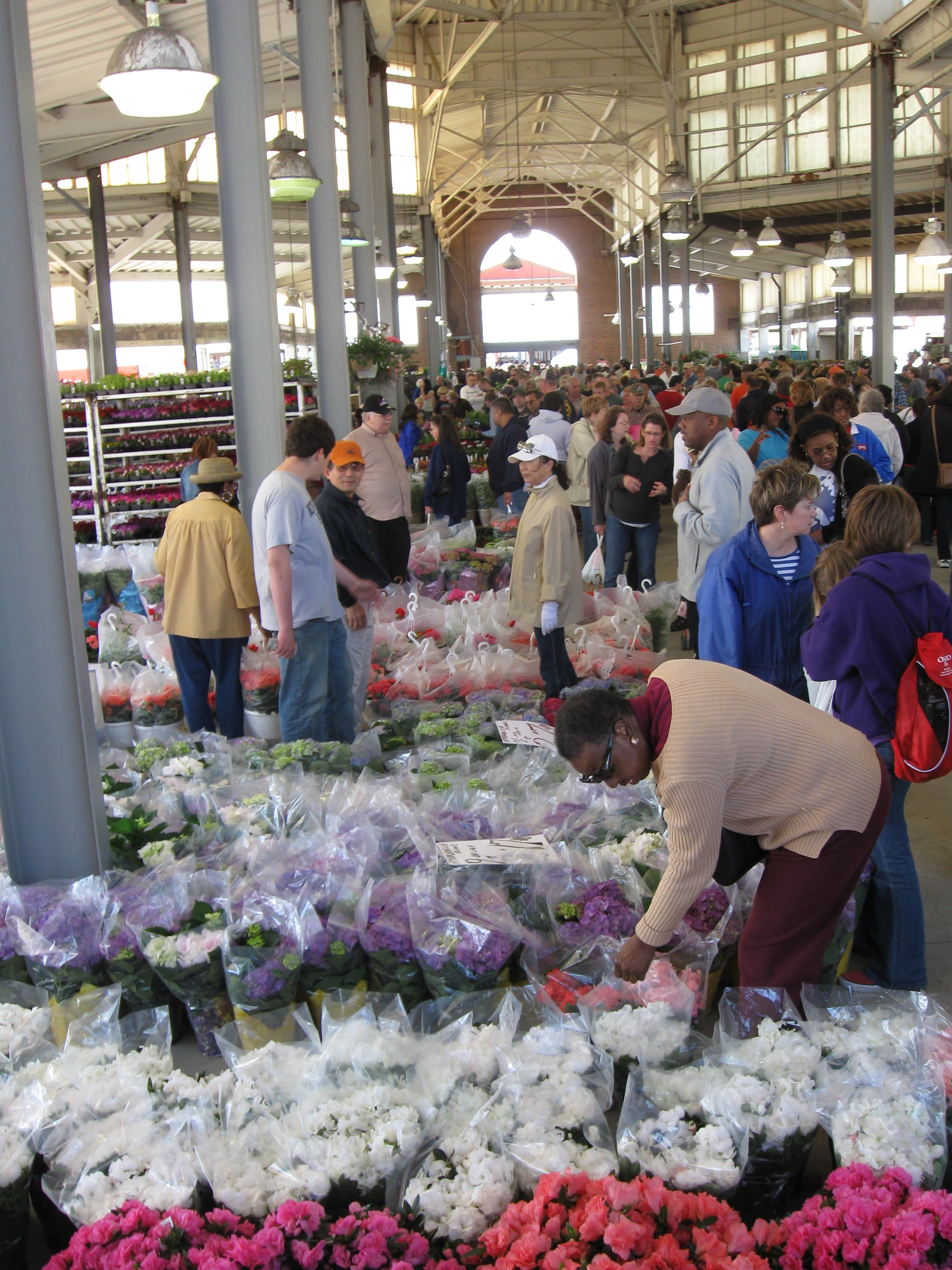
Flower market section

From 1841 until the end of the nineteenth century, Detroit's primary market was located at City Hall in Cadillac Square. As the industrial sector grew and more workers moved to Detroit, this space in downtown became increasingly valuable real estate, and it became clear that the existing market was not large enough to serve the rapidly growing urban population. An informal market space for hay and wood had already been established a few years prior in the present-day Eastern Market district, so city leadership took advantage of the community's familiarity with the site and officially moved Detroit's farmer's market in 1891. A second city-sponsored market was established at the same on the west side at the corner of Michigan Ave and 18th Street. Today, only Eastern Market survives, the western market torn down in 1965 during the construction of a freeway interchange. Shed 1 at Eastern Market, completed in 1892, was similarly demolished in 1967 to make space for the construction of a nearby freeway. Shed 2 was added in 1898, Shed 3 in 1922, Shed 4 in 1938, Shed 5 in 1939 (but rebuilt in 1981), and Shed 6 in 1966. Today, the five central market sheds occupy 14 acres of land, and the entire Eastern Market district spans 43 acres between Gratiot Avenue and Mack Avenue. The sheds sit on land that housed a city cemetery and a correctional facility prior to the construction of the market.

In the early twentieth century, the area was home to much of Detroit's Italian and German communities, although there is no tight-knit ethnic neighborhood in the area today. During the Great Depression, Eastern Market offered Detroiters the chance to purchase food at a lower price than most stores because they could buy directly from producers. Farmers in the region also benefitted at this time because the city residents' reliance on the market ensured they had a steady stream of customers. Similarly, during World War II food shortages, the market provided relief to consumers by allowing them to purchase more food than ration coupons allowed at brick-and-mortar shops. Even once this practice was restricted in 1944, the black market for ration coupons openly flourished in the district. Following World War II, more wholesalers and food processors moved into the area, and Eastern Market developed into an important hub for the wholesale food distribution industry. At the same time, large-scale food retailers became more prominent in the US, which led to a decrease in individual consumer traffic at the market. Detroit also entered a period of economic decline during the second half of the twentieth century, which impacted the market. The city's shrinking population and the growing number of vacant lots in the Eastern Market neighborhood meant that running the market became costly for the city, with seemingly fewer and fewer socioeconomic benefits each year. By the late 1960s, Eastern Market was under threat of closure, but it made a comeback in the early 1970s when the addition of new murals (as well as the growing popular interest in the environmental movement) garnered newfound interest from the public. These initial murals were primarily paintings of produce and livestock. Over the years, they have become Eastern Market logos.

=== Eastern Market Corporation, 2006–present ===
In 2006, in an effort to maintain the character of the market during citywide financial challenges, market operations were shifted to the newly created Eastern Market Corporation (EMC). The EMC is a nonprofit public-private partnership that is responsible for managing day-to-day operations, restoring and maintaining the sheds, and promoting the market to the public. In its first ten years of operation, the EMC spent over $10 million on renovations. Since the shift in management, the market has seen an increase in visitors and has even added Tuesday and Sunday hours during the summer. EMC initiatives have also fostered substantially more investment from private, corporate, and nonprofit donors. Today, the market has more specialty and boutique food producers than before the EMC takeover, transforming the sheds from a farmers' market to a space for shoppers to participate in cultural immersion, novel culinary experiences, community engagement, and the construction of a local (commercial) identity.

In 2022, the Detroit Unity Bell, a centerpiece from the now-demolished Old City Hall, was added to the market. The bell's name is a nod to Philadelphia's Liberty Bell.

== Present uses ==
As of 2025, the public market is open on Saturdays year-round and on Tuesdays and Sundays during the summer months. The wholesale market operates at night every weekday from April to November. At peak times during the summer, Eastern Market can see up to 40,000 visitors in a single day.

In 2007, Eastern Market's historic district designation was expanded beyond the market's sheds to encompass 76 neighboring historic structures. At 43 acres (17 ha), Eastern Market is the largest historic public market district in the United States. The sheds are a selling point for a wide variety of produce, meat, spices and other products, while the extended district includes restaurants, grocers, retail businesses, and specialty food producers. On home game days, the market allows Detroit Lions fans to tailgate in its parking lots.

Local and internationally recognized art galleries, studios, and makerspaces have recently established spaces nearby, including The Red Bull House of Art, OmniCorp Detroit, Inner State Gallery, Riopelle and Project. Independent eateries, shops and performance spaces such as Trinosophes, Antietam, and People's Records have arrived in storefront spaces along Gratiot Avenue, and light manufacturing and e-commerce retailers including 1XRUN and Cyberoptix continue to operate out of upper floors. The annual Murals in the Market festival, hosted in the fall by 1XRUN, commissions local artists to paint murals around the Eastern Market district. Murals in the Market is part of the citywide Detroit Month of Design, which brings artist panels, galleries, art vendors, and the signature Eastern Market After Dark event to the district.

In addition to Murals in the Market, the Eastern Market sheds are also often used as space for hosting city events and festivals. Some of the current annual community events include Flower Day (May), Detroit Burger Battle (June), Detroit Festival of Books (July), Taco Showdown (July), Detroit Sandwich Party (September), Eastern Market After Dark (September), Detroit Fall Beer Festival (October), Whiskey Wonderland (November), and All Things Detroit (twice per year). Some events, such as the Detroit Festival of Books, attract over 10,000 attendees.

=== Sustainability Efforts ===
Detroit's large amount of vacant land, combined with a need for more robust local food systems, has made it possible for the city to become a national leader in urban agriculture during the twenty-first century. Eastern Market, as one of the oldest and largest continually run farmers' markets in the US, is a key hub for the city's turn towards sustainable food system practices. The market participates in a range of programs that provide food assistance for low-income residents, support farm-to-table initiatives, and help young chefs start new businesses. Wholesale market hours offer nonprofits and local cooperatives the opportunity to purchase food at a reduced per-unit price. Bridging the interests of stakeholders both within and beyond the district, Eastern Market provides a space for small businesses, local nonprofits, public sector initiatives, and educational programs to converge, encouraging robust socioeconomic development. However, Eastern Market, like other neighborhoods near downtown Detroit, has become increasingly gentrified in recent years.

The market is currently participating in a "Sustainable Cities Challenge" effort to reduce the carbon footprint of the market. To ensure that the market district, which is in a period of growth, continues to serve the health and well-being of Detroiters, the challenge encourages local businesses and nonprofits to develop methods for cutting down on the market's reliance on fossil fuels and reducing the number of freight vehicles in operation in the district.

== Gallery ==
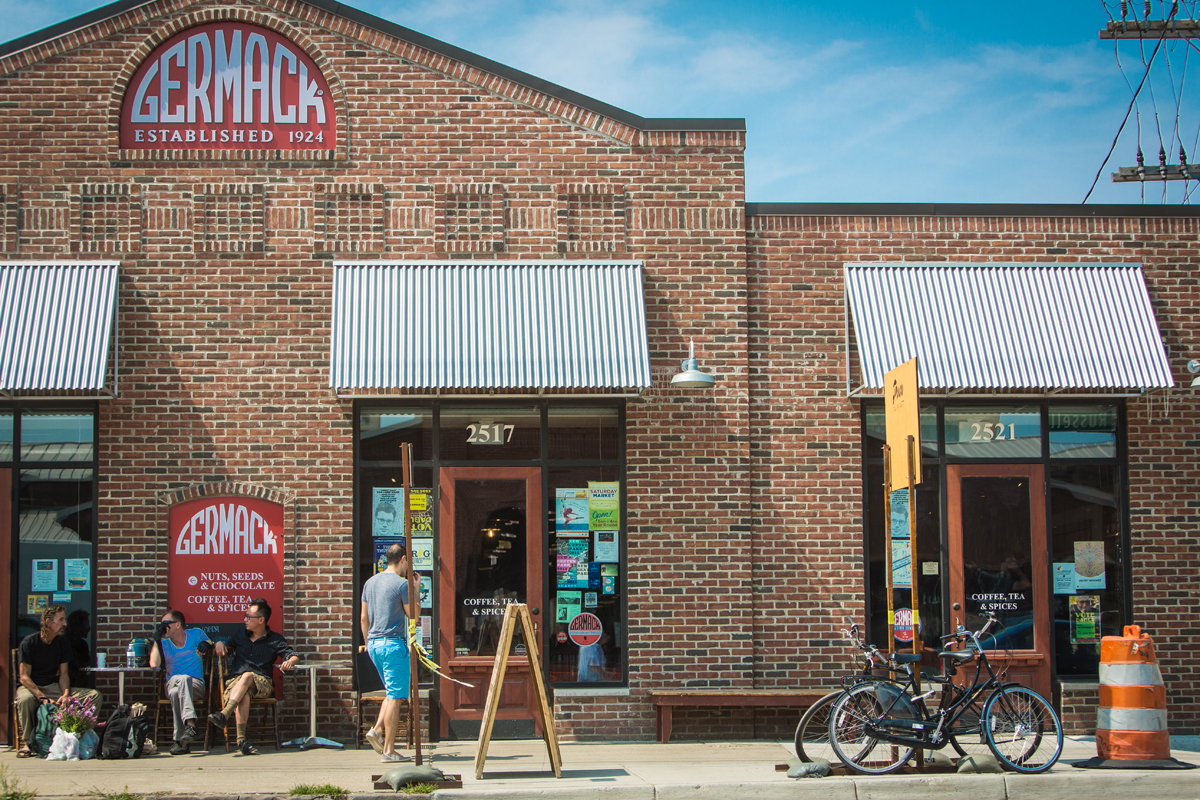
Germack Pistachio Company

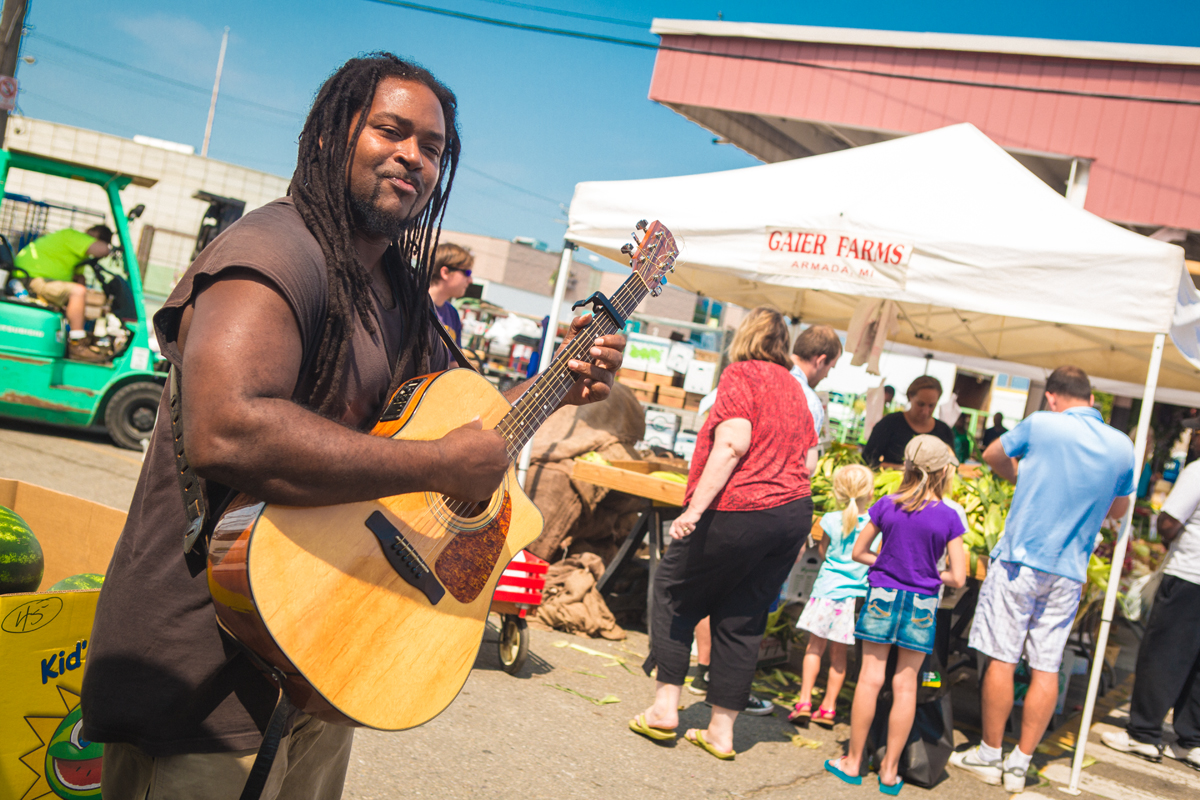
Eastern Market Busker

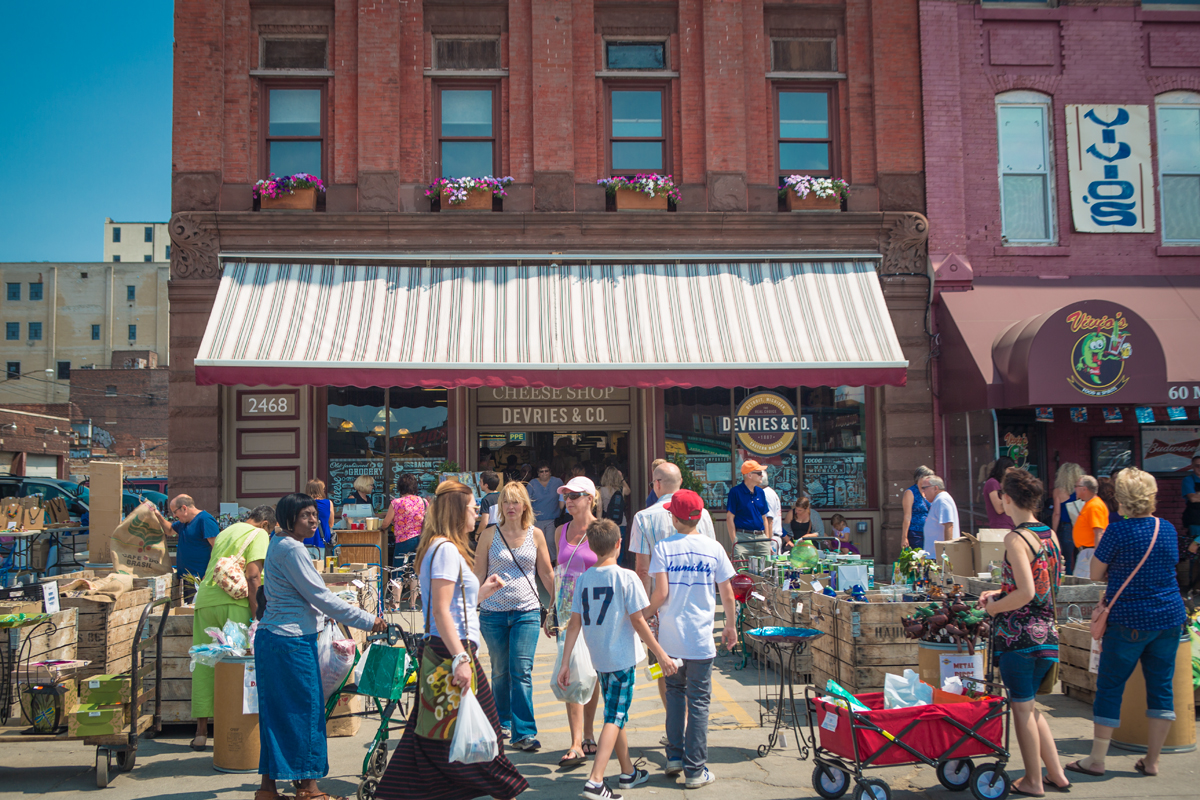
DeVries & Company 1887

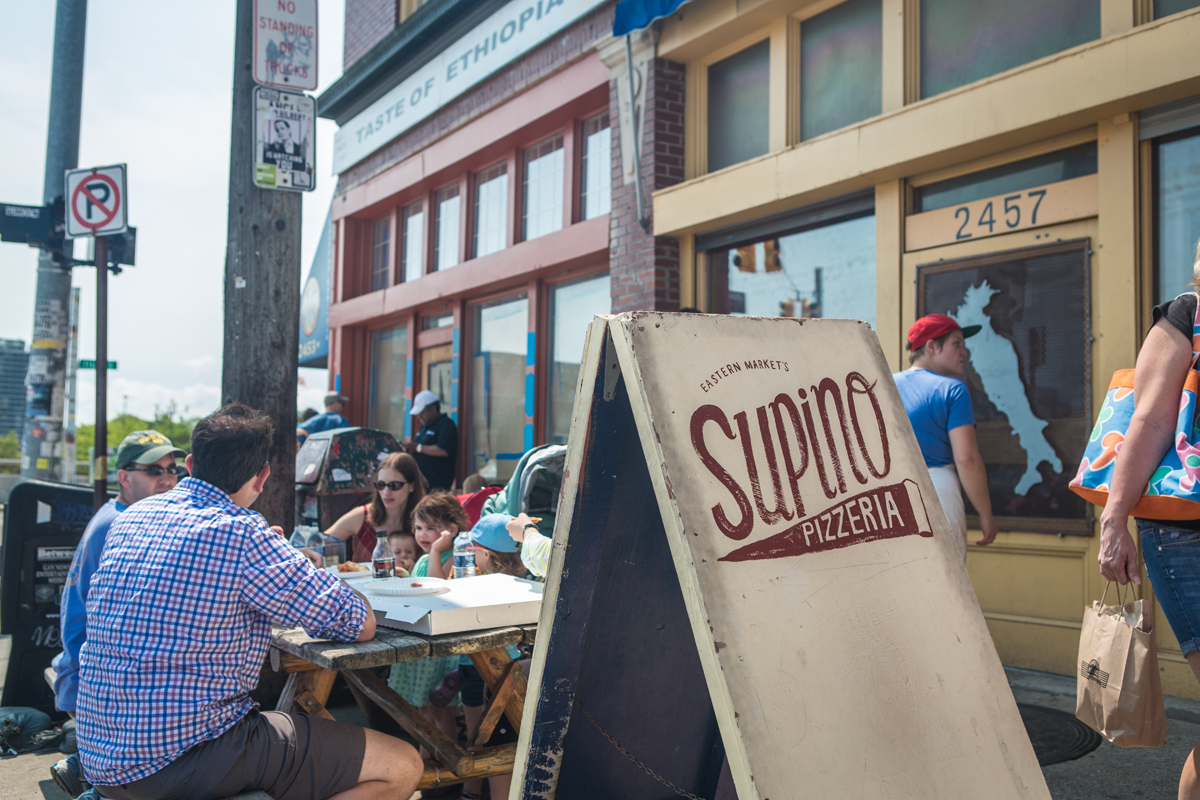
Supino Pizza

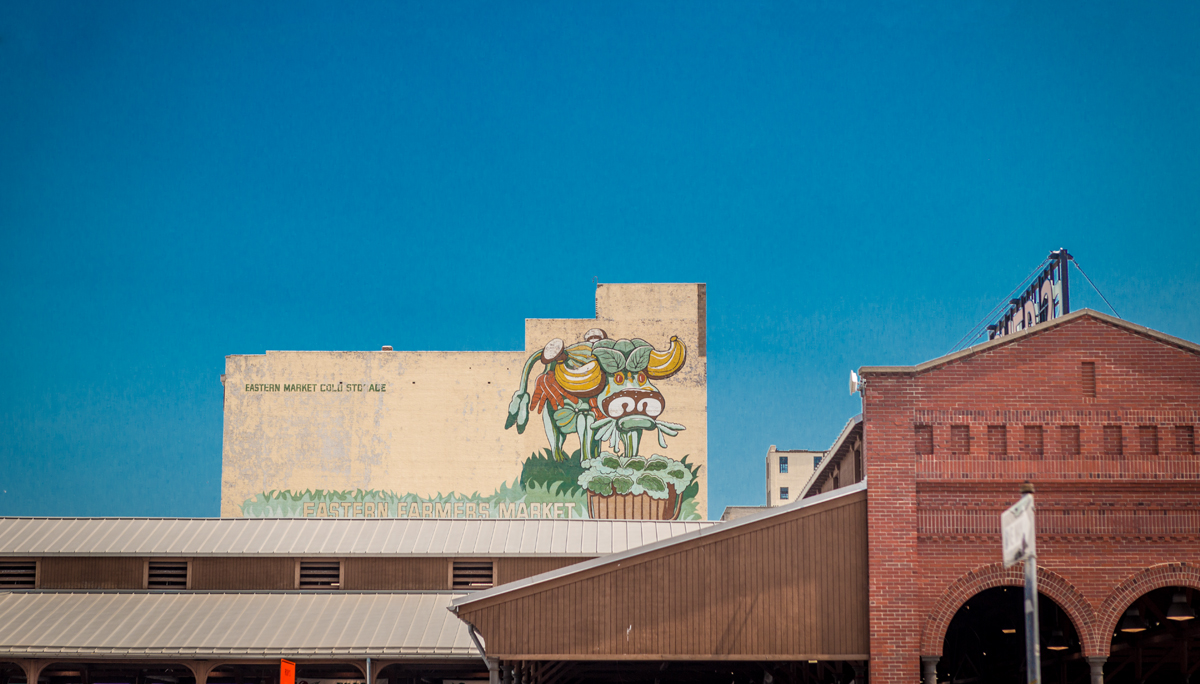
Eastern Market Artwork

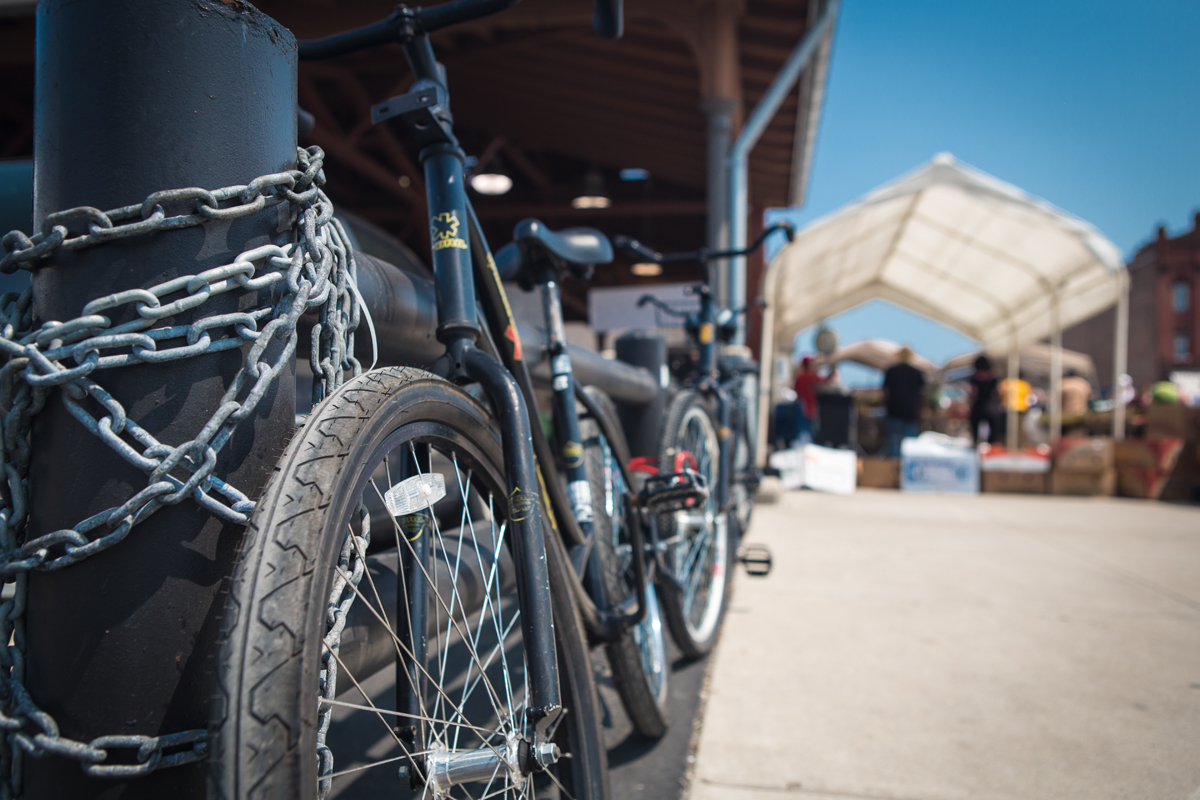
Bikes at the market

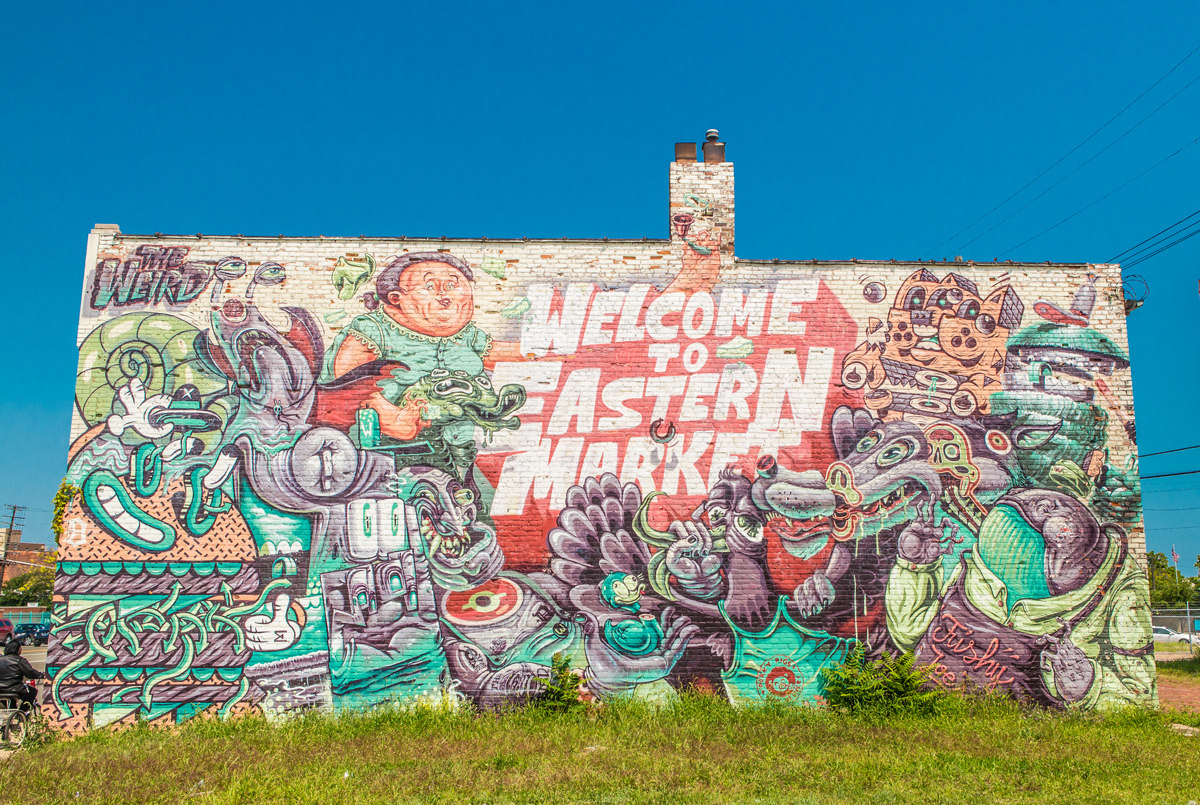
Art - Graffiti

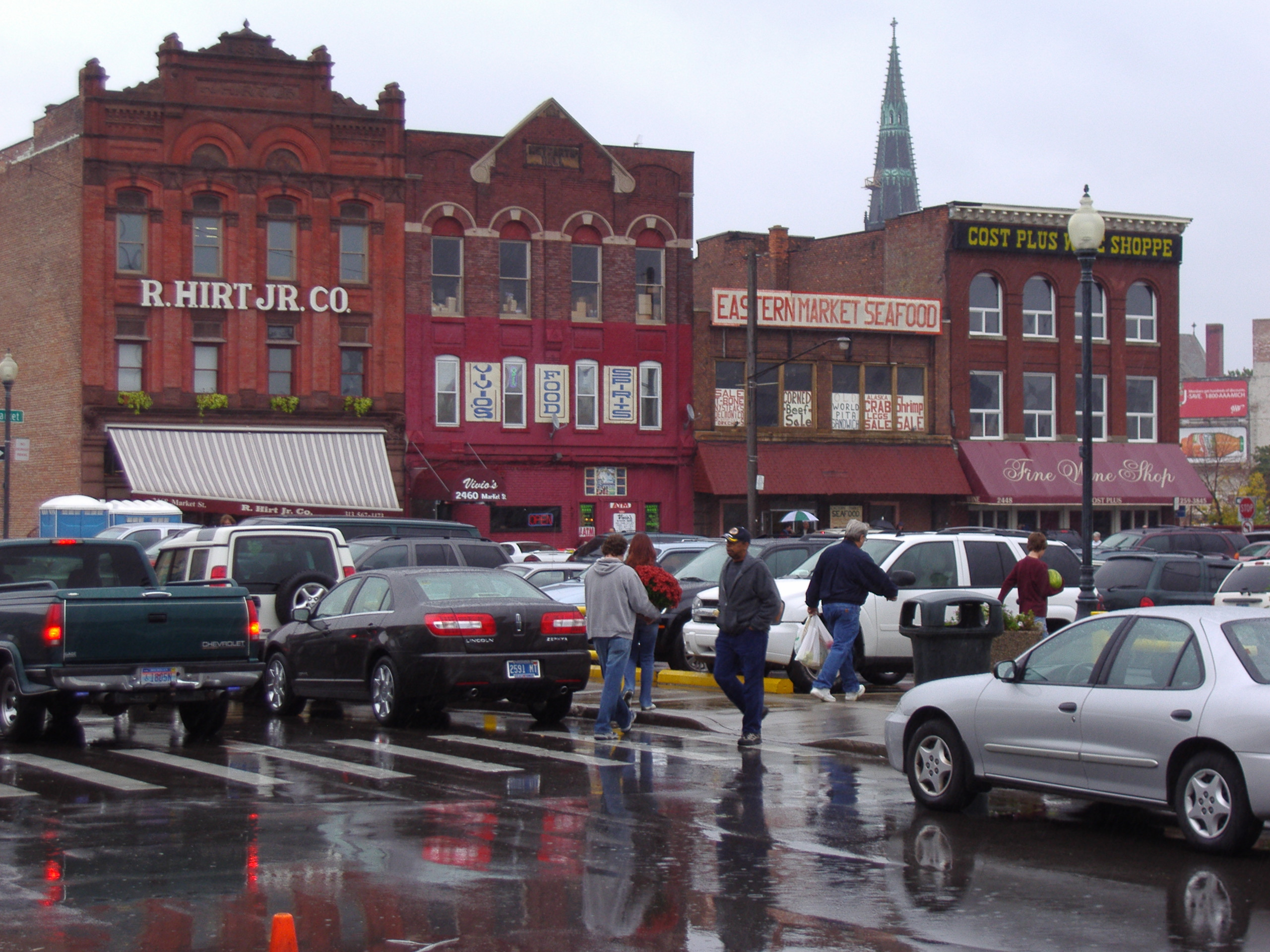
The R. Hirt Jr., Co. (1893) in the Eastern Market

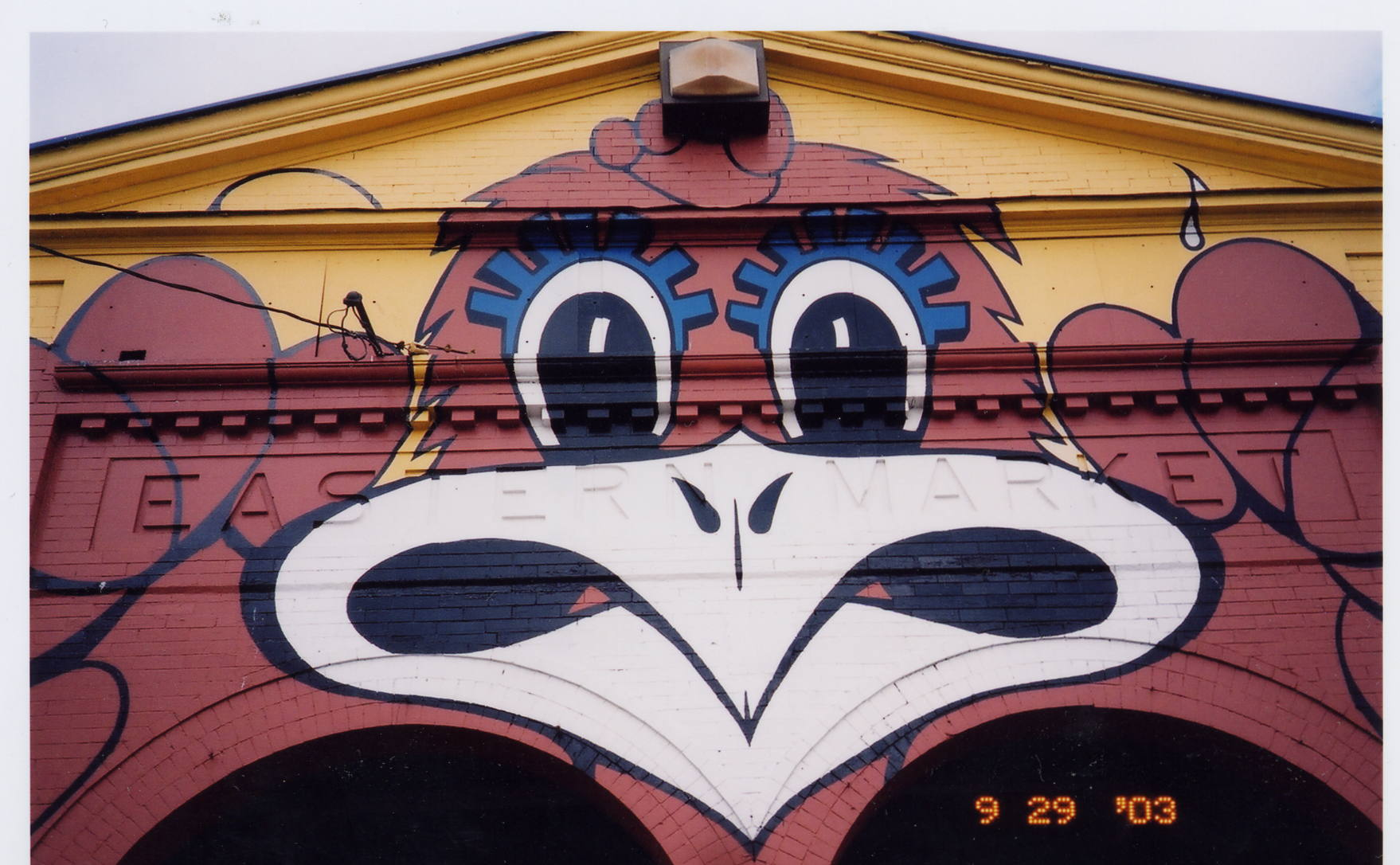
Before renovation

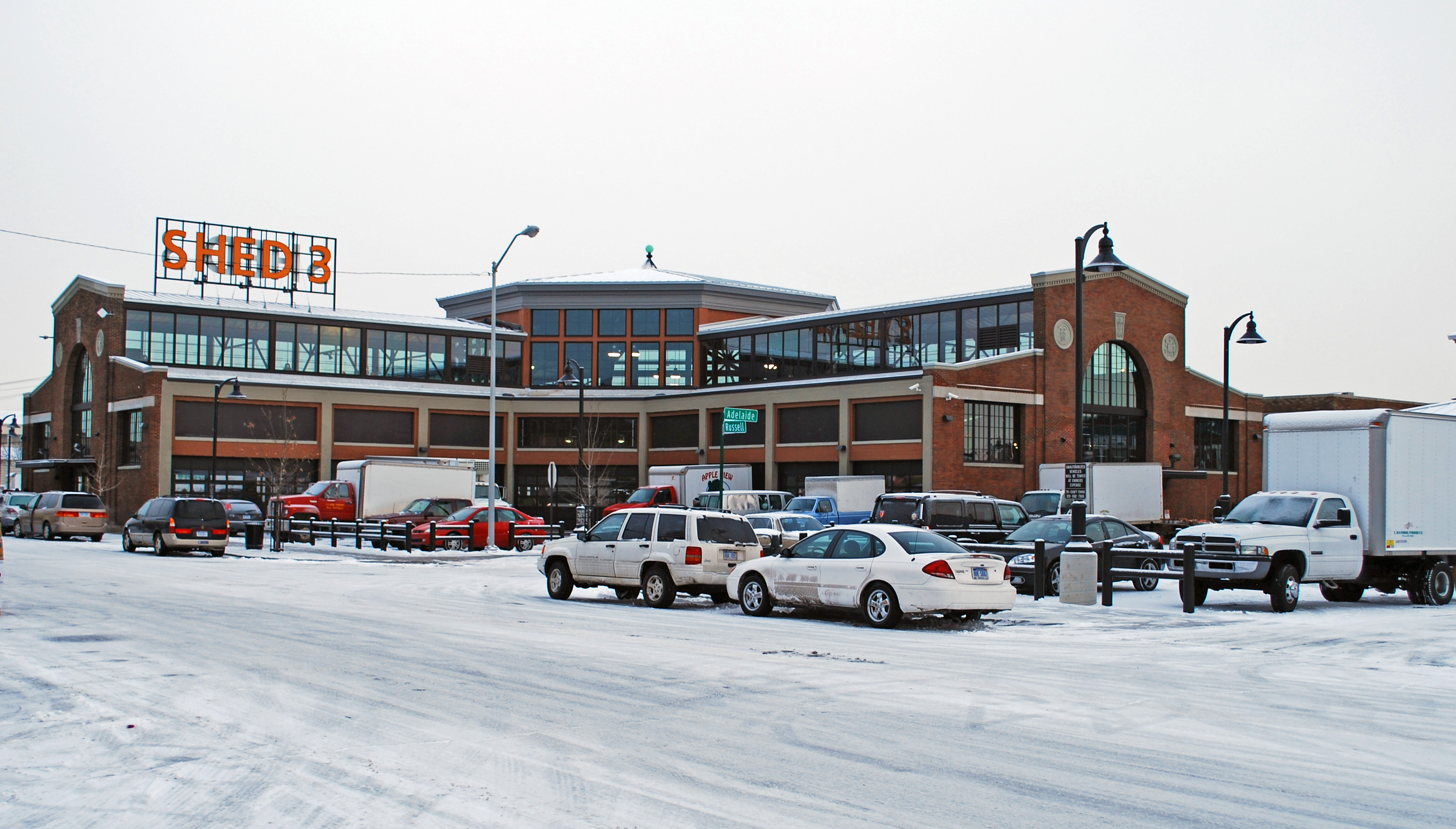
Shed 3 after renovation, 2009

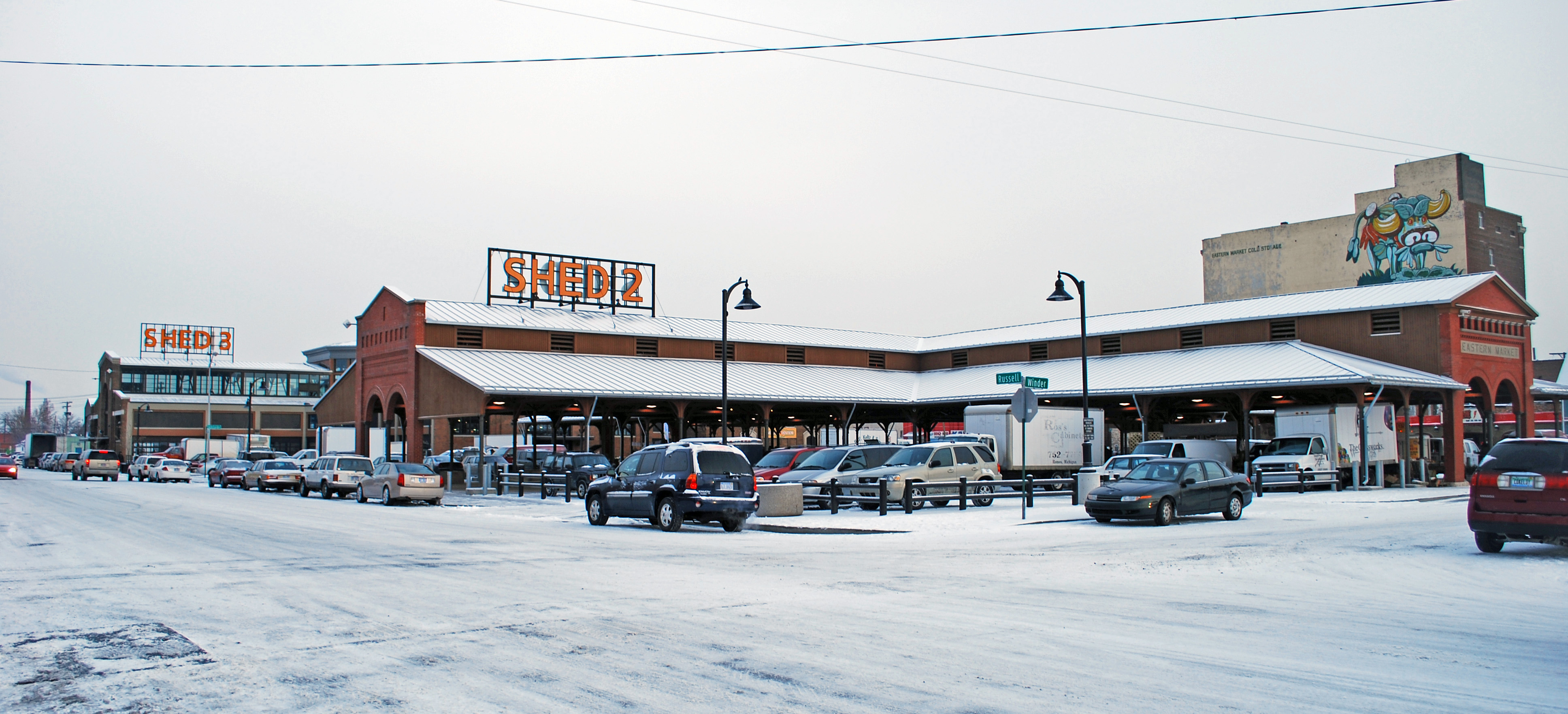
Sheds 2 and 3 after renovation, 2009

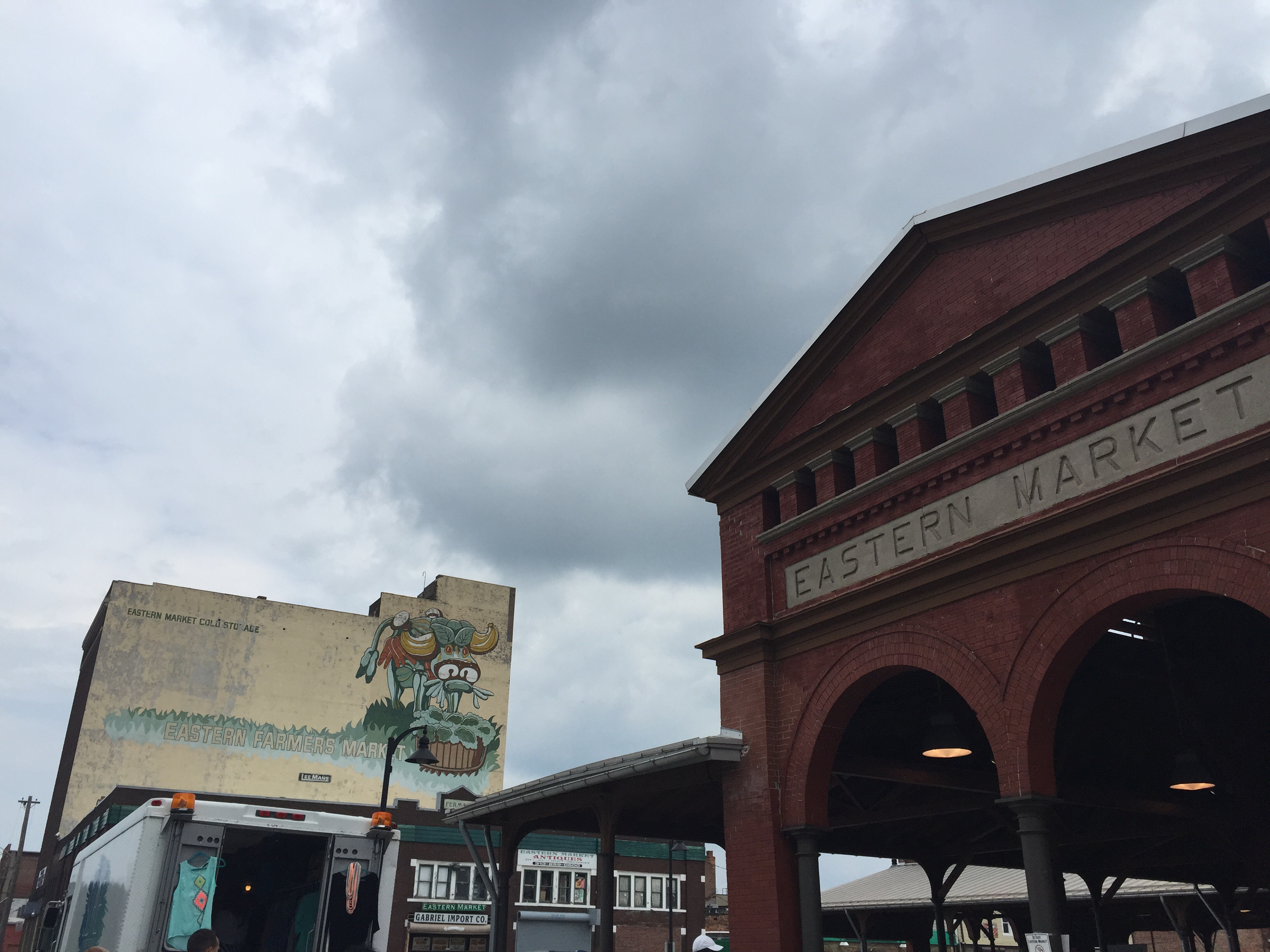
Shed 5 and mural

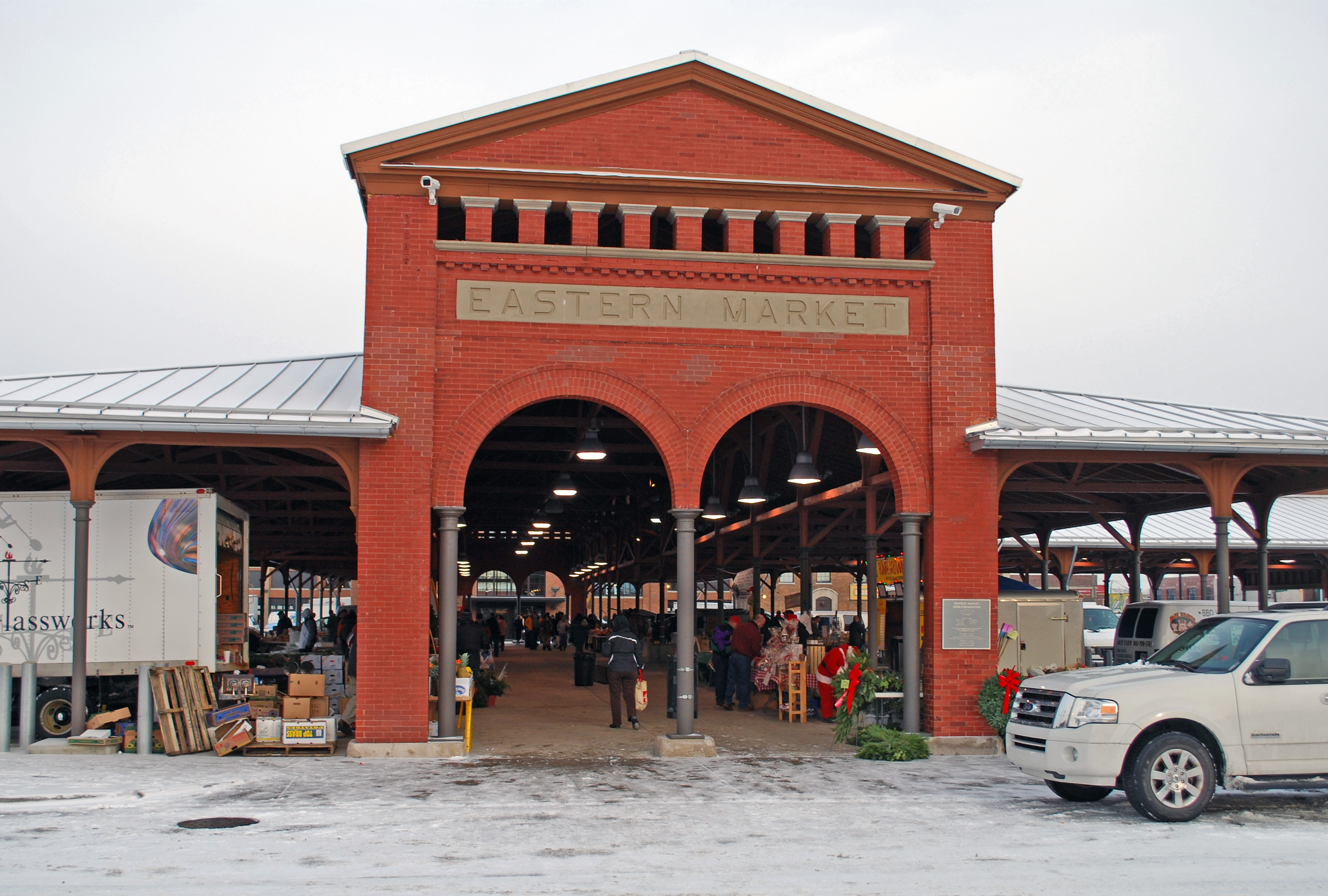
Shed 2 facade in the winter
