= St. Stanislaus Bishop and Martyr Roman Catholic Church =

Historic church in Michigan, United States

- St. Stanislaus Bishop and Martyr Roman Catholic Parish Complex
- U.S. National Register of Historic Places
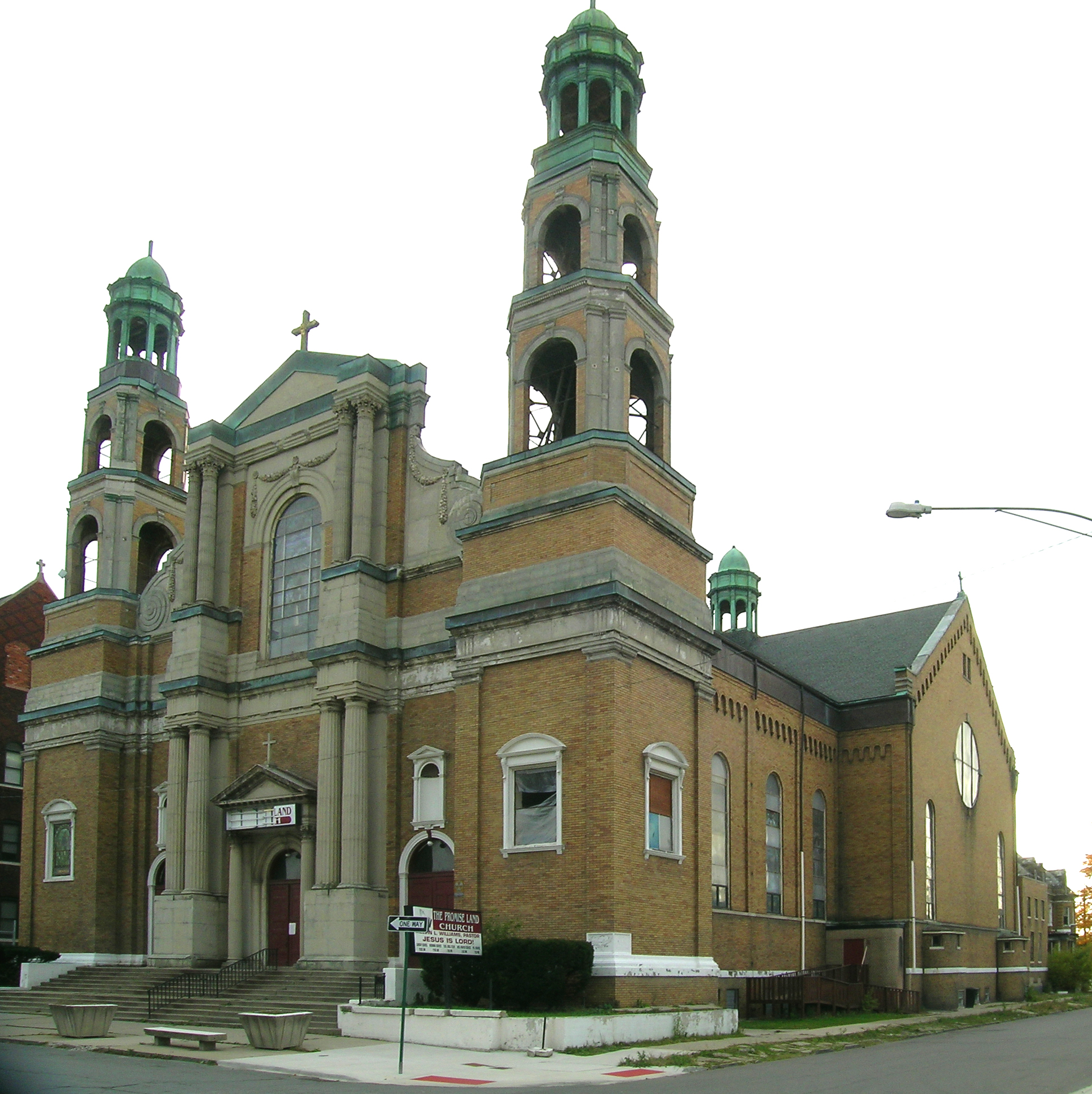
- Interactive map
- Location: 5818 Dubois Street; Detroit, Michigan
- Coordinates: 42°22′19″N 83°2′49″W
- Built: 1911–13
- Architect: Kastler & Hunter, Harry J. Rill
- Architectural style: Late Gothic Revival, Beaux-Arts, Renaissance Revival
- NRHP reference No.: 89000788
- Added to NRHP: July 14, 1989

The St. Stanislaus Bishop and Martyr Roman Catholic Church is a church located at 5818 Dubois Street in Detroit, Michigan. The church was listed on the National Register of Historic Places in 1989.

== History ==
In 1898, the parish of St. Stanislaus was established to relieve the overcrowding in the Polish congregation of at St. Albertus. A church and school were purchased for the parish from the Protestant Bethel Church, and in 1900 a new elementary school was constructed. Reverend F. G. Zella was assigned as the first pastor. However, between 1905-1910 the population of the church doubled, and a new church was desperately needed.

In 1911, work began on a magnificent Baroque church with a lavish Beaux-Arts interior, which was completed in 1913. In 1921, a convent was built for the Felician Sisters who ran the school; seven years later, a high school was constructed. By the late 1940s, St. Stanislaus was the largest Polish parish school in Michigan.

After World War II, the demographics of the neighborhood changed as the Polish Catholics moved out of the city and into the suburbs; in addition, the construction of Interstate 94 split the parish and displaced a number of families. Enrollment in the parish school declined, and the grade school was closed in 1968, the high school in 1973, and the convent demolished soon after.

The parish underwent a resurgence in the late 1970s, but the 1989 reorganization of the Archdiocese of Detroit eliminated the parish. The Archdiocese sold the structure to University of Michigan organist Sam Koontz of Ann Arbor, MI in 1989. The congregation of Promise Land Missionary Baptist Church purchased the church from Koontz's estate in 1995, but lost it through foreclosure in September 2012.

In January 2013, the church was for sale as-is for $79,000. It requires extensive work and several stained glass windows and other architectural elements had previously been removed. The school buildings house the Detroit Academy of Arts & Sciences and were not affected by the foreclosure and sale.

== See also ==
- Polish Cathedral style
