= St. Josaphat Roman Catholic Church =

Historic church in Michigan, United States

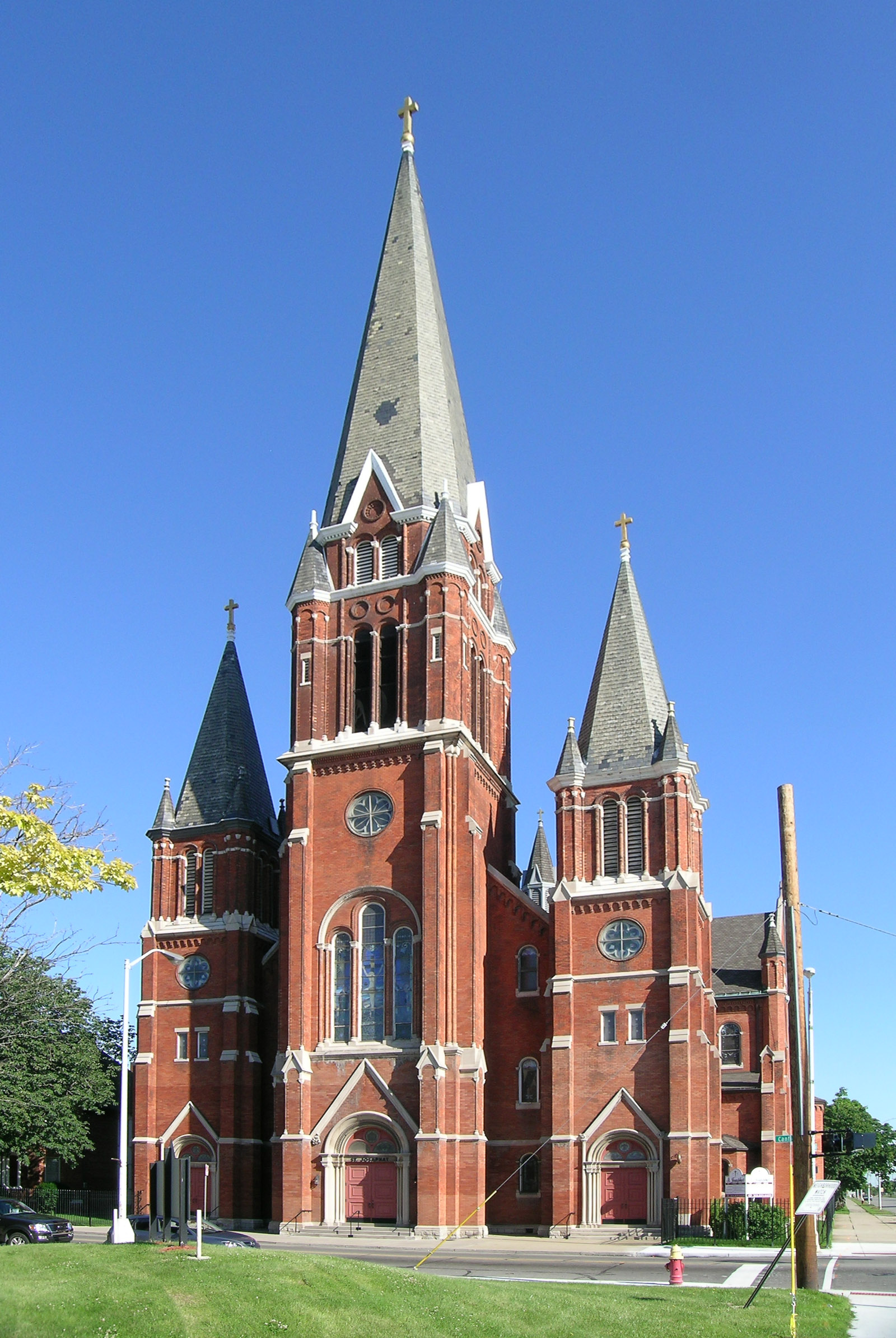

Religion
- Affiliation: Roman Catholic
- Leadership: Fr. Gregory Tokarski
- Year consecrated: 1901

Location
- Location: 715 East Canfield Street; Detroit, Michigan
- Interactive map of St. Josaphat Roman Catholic Church
- Coordinates: 42°21′21″N 83°3′10″W

Architecture
- Architects: Joseph G. Kastler, William E. N. Hunter
- Type: church
- Style: Romanesque Revival, Gothic Revival
- Completed: 1901

Specifications
- Capacity: 1,100
- Length: 132 feet (40 m)
- Width: 56 feet (17 m)
- Height (max): 200 feet (61 m)
- Materials: brick, limestone
- St. Josaphat Roman Catholic Church
- U.S. National Register of Historic Places
- Michigan State Historic Site
- Built: 1901
- NRHP reference No.: 82000555

Significant dates
- Added to NRHP: December 8, 1982
- Designated MSHS: 1985

Website
- www.motherofdivinemercy.org

St. Josaphat Roman Catholic Church is a Roman Catholic church located at 715 East Canfield Street in Detroit, Michigan. It was listed on the National Register of Historic Places in 1982 and designated a Michigan State Historic Site in 1985. Since 2013, it has been one of two churches that comprise Mother of Divine Mercy Parish.

== History ==
In 1889, the Polish community of St. Albertus Roman Catholic Church was outgrowing the capacity of the church, and the parish of St. Josaphat was started on June first to serve the burgeoning community. The church is named after St. Josaphat Kuntsevych, a Greek Catholic priest, who became archbishop of Polotsk, Poland, (now Belarus) in 1617. He was martyred in 1623 and canonized in 1867, thus it is likely that this parish, founded only 22 years later, was among the first to bear his name.

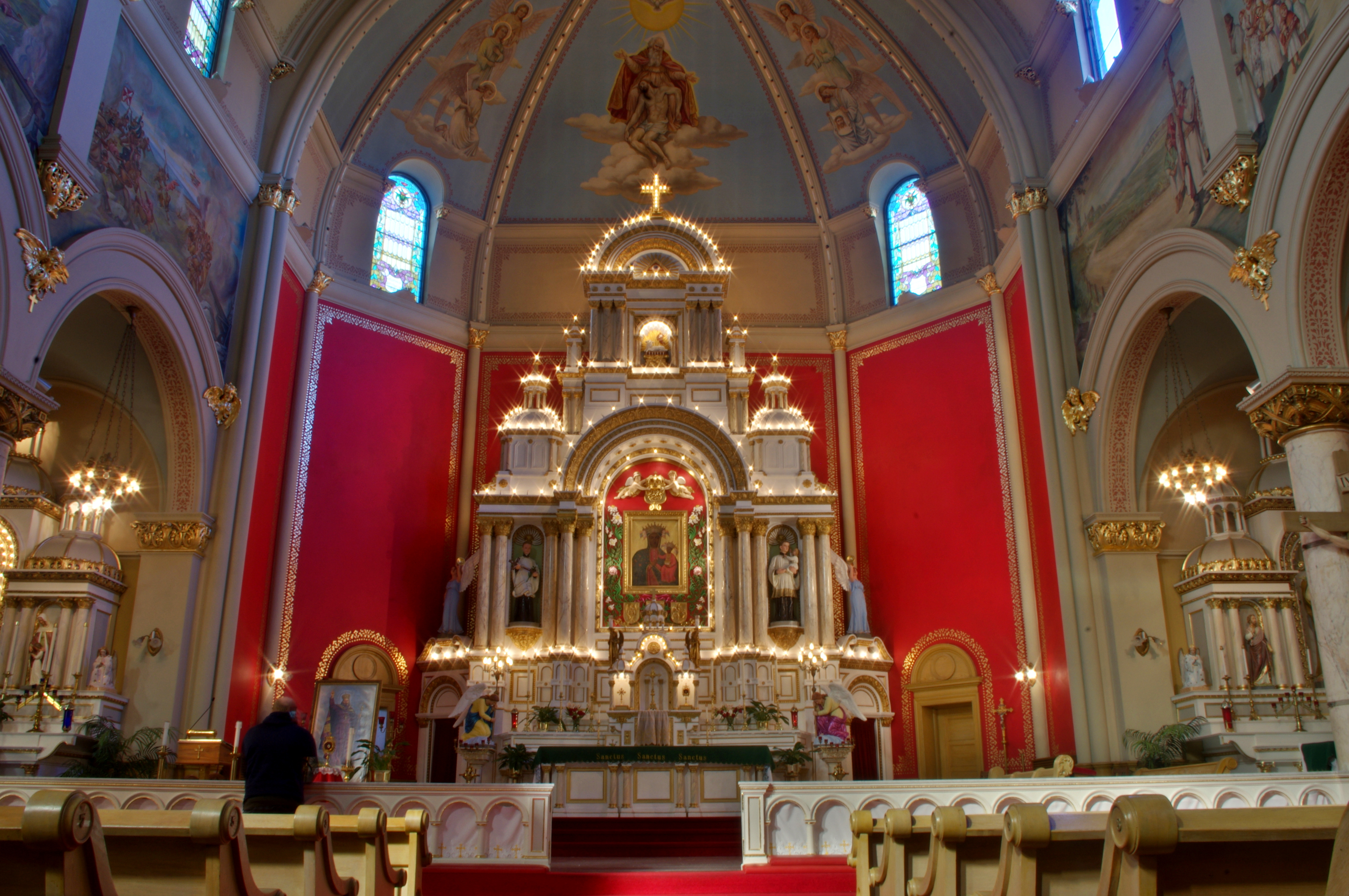
Main Altar and Reredos

The church was located on Canfield not far west of the Sweetest Heart Of Mary Roman Catholic Church. It is possible that the choice of location was intended to compete with Sweetest Heart, which was at the time a Polish Catholic church unsanctioned by the diocese. On February 2, 1890, parishioners dedicated the first building of St. Josaphat, a combination church and school. However, in the next decade, the church grew to over 1,000 families under the leadership of Father Razadkowski. In response, Razadkowski raised funds to build the current church. The structure opened in 1901, along with a rectory and janitor's home. A school was built in the 1920s.

By 1960, the Polish community that had once attended the church had scattered to the suburbs. The school was closed and demolished, and St. Josaphat struggled with dwindling membership and the upkeep of the aging church. However, the parish began a building rehabilitation program, and it continues to serve the Polish community.

In 2004, St. Josaphat became the home for the Archdiocese of Detroit's first regular celebrations of the Tridentine Latin Mass since the liturgical reforms following the Second Vatican Council. This ceased in 2016, when responsibility for this service was entrusted to the Institute of Christ the King at the St. Joseph Oratory in the city.

== Architecture ==
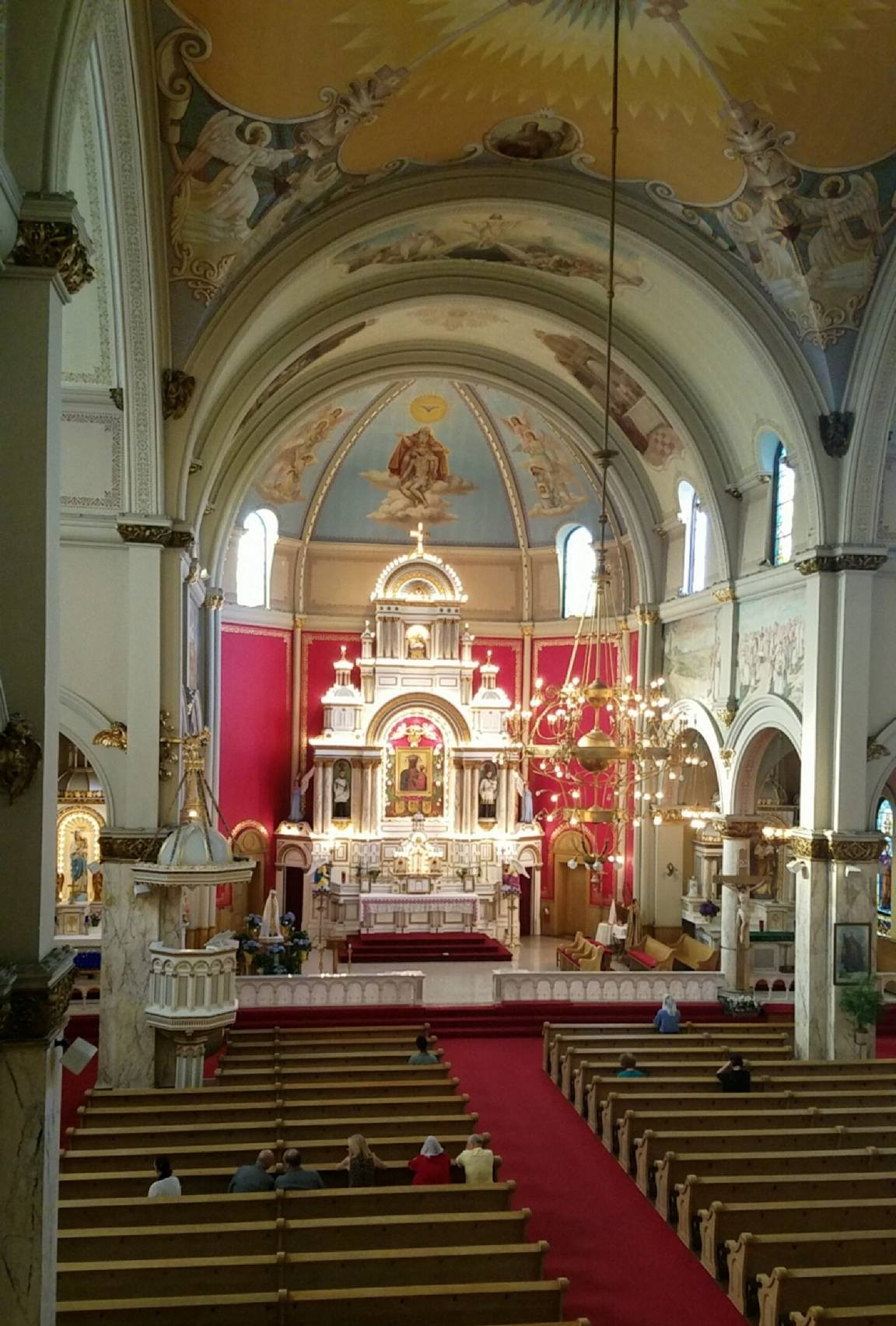
The interior of St. Josaphat, as seen from the left side of the choir loft.

The Victorian Romanesque Revival and Gothic Revival style church was designed by Joseph G. Kastler and William E. N. Hunter. It was built by the Jermolowicz Brothers and local carpenters, Harcus and Lang. The church measures 132 feet (40 m) by 56 feet (17 m), with a 65-foot (20 m) ceiling and a seating capacity of 1100. The main steeple is 200 feet (61 m) tall, while the two side steeples are each 100 feet. The exterior of the church is built from red and orange brick, extensively trimmed with Bedford Indiana buff limestone. The stained glass windows, depicting Mary & Joseph and the twelve apostles, were made by the Detroit Stained Glass Works.

The interior of the church contains five altars. On the main altar there is a painting of St. Josaphat, dressed in the vestments of an eastern rite bishop. The side altars are dedicated to the Virgin Mary and St. Joseph, and in the transept of the church are altars dedicated to Saints Anthony of Padua and Francis of Assisi. The woodwork in the church is crafted of white oak, and there is an extensive collection of murals on the walls.

== Current information ==
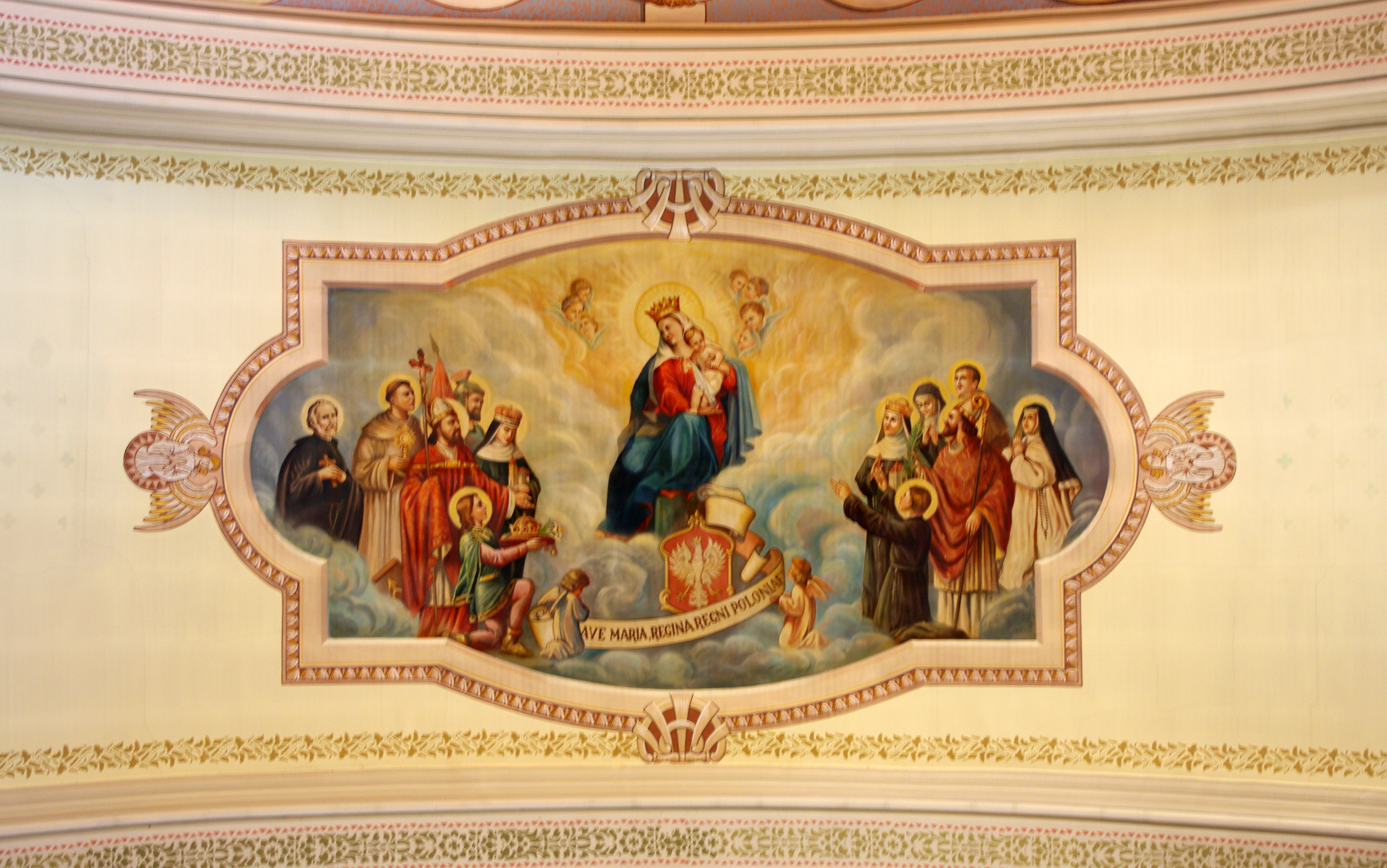
Ceiling mural of Our Lady, Queen of Poland.

The church was placed on the National Register of Historic Places in 1982, and received historic recognition from the city of Detroit in 1983, and as a Michigan State Historic Site from the state of Michigan in 1985.

On June 19, 2013, a decree from his excellency Allen H. Vigneron, Archbishop of Detroit, created the new Mother of Divine Mercy Parish from the clustered parishes of St. Josaphat, Sweetest Heart of Mary and St. Joseph. St. Joseph Church was separated from Mother of Divine Mercy Parish in October 2016 to form St. Joseph Oratory.

Effective July 1, 2013, Fr. Gregory Tokarski became new pastor of the parish.

In November 2013, the main spire suffered structural damage during a winter storm. Because the congregation did not have the funds to make necessary repairs, it announced on November 19, 2013, that the spire would be demolished and replaced with a small roof.

== See also ==
- Roman Catholic Archdiocese of Detroit
