= Sweetest Heart of Mary Roman Catholic Church =

Historic church in Michigan, United States

- U.S. National Register of Historic Places
- Michigan State Historic Site
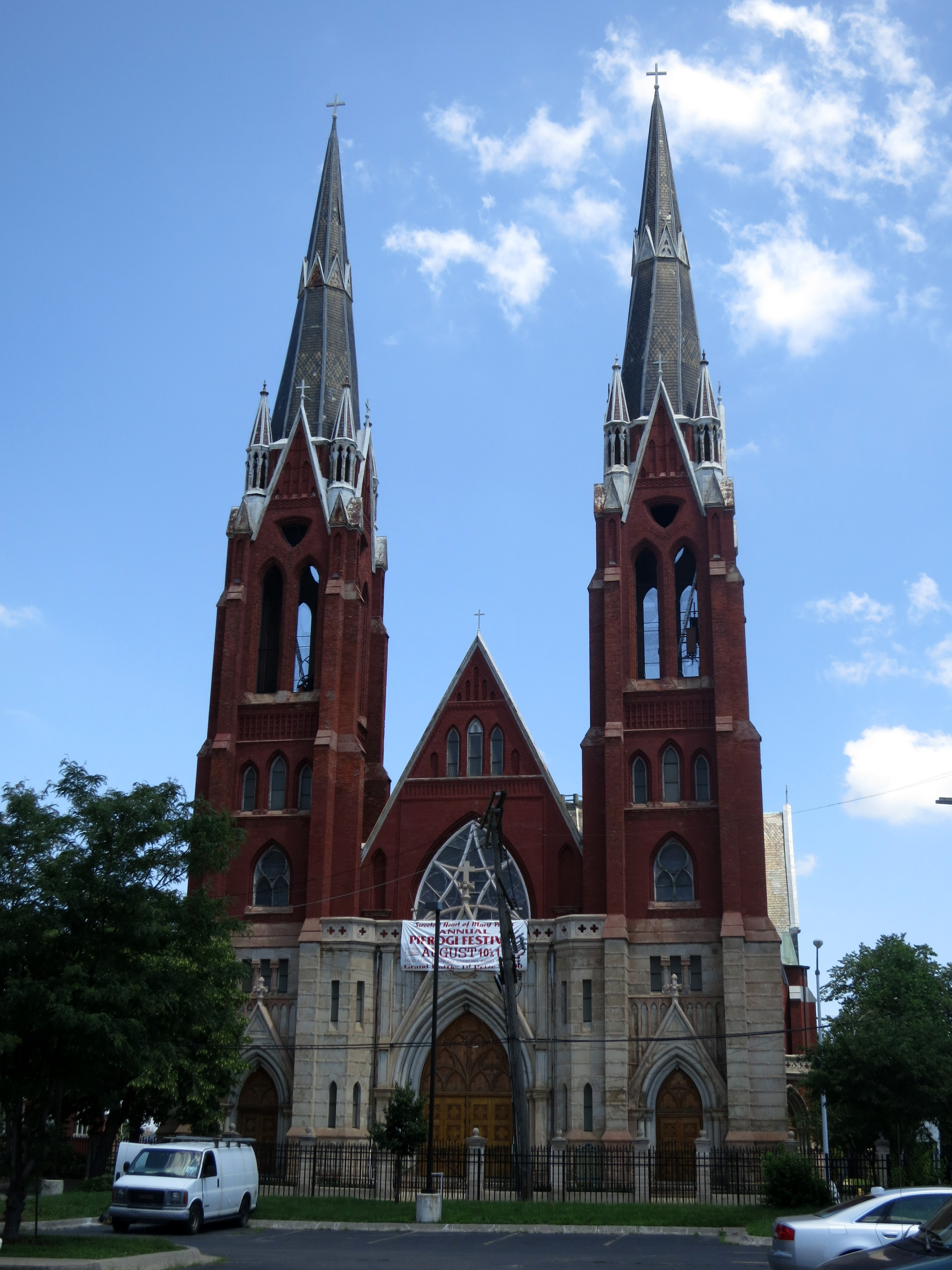
- Interactive map
- Location: 4440 Russell Street; Detroit, Michigan
- Coordinates: 42°21′30″N 83°2′52″W
- Built: 1893
- Architect: Spier & Rohns
- Architectural style: Gothic Revival, Polish Cathedral
- NRHP reference No.: 78001523

Significant dates
- Added to NRHP: January 31, 1978
- Designated MSHS: July 26, 1974

The Sweetest Heart of Mary Roman Catholic Church is located at 4440 Russell Street (at East Canfield Street) in Detroit, Michigan, in the Forest Park neighborhood on the city's central East side. It was designated a Michigan State Historic Site in 1974 and listed on the National Register of Historic Places in 1978. It, along with St. Albertus Roman Catholic Church, 0.4 miles east on East Canfield Street, and St. Josaphat Roman Catholic Church, 0.3 miles west at East Canfield Street and Chrysler Drive, served the large Polish community through most of the twentieth century. In a diocesan reorganization instituted by Archbishop Allen Vigneron in 2013, Sweetest Heart of Mary joined with St. Josephat to form Mother of Divine Mercy Parish.

== History ==
The rise of Detroit brought in many Polish immigrants into the city in the 19th century; by the mid-1850s, the number of Polish families who had settled in the city was significant. These émigrés from Poland first attended St. Joseph's parish, which was at the time a German-speaking church. However, the Polish congregants were dissatisfied, and agitated for a Polish church. In 1871, three hundred or so Polish families organized St. Albertus Parish and built a frame church at St. Aubin and Canfield Avenue. In 1882, the charismatic Father Dominic Hippolytus Kolasinski became pastor of St. Albertus. Kolasinski organized the parish to construct the present St. Albertus Church, which was dedicated in 1885. In November 1885, the parish became factionalized and Kolasinski was reassigned. When Reverend John Foley became the new Bishop of Detroit in 1888, Kolasinski returned to the city and began the Parish of the Sweetest Heart of Mary outside the jurisdiction of the Detroit Diocese. Shortly afterward, the congregation added the school structure on Canfield, which still stands behind the church.

Kolasinski negotiated to bring his flock, numbering nearly 4,000 families, into the fold of the Catholic Church. The Panic of 1893 hit the parish hard. Parish members secured a loan in order to keep the building. Eventually, Rome directed the bishop of Detroit to make peace with Kolasinski, and the congregation of the Sweetest Heart of Mary was officially received into the Diocese of Detroit on February 18, 1894.

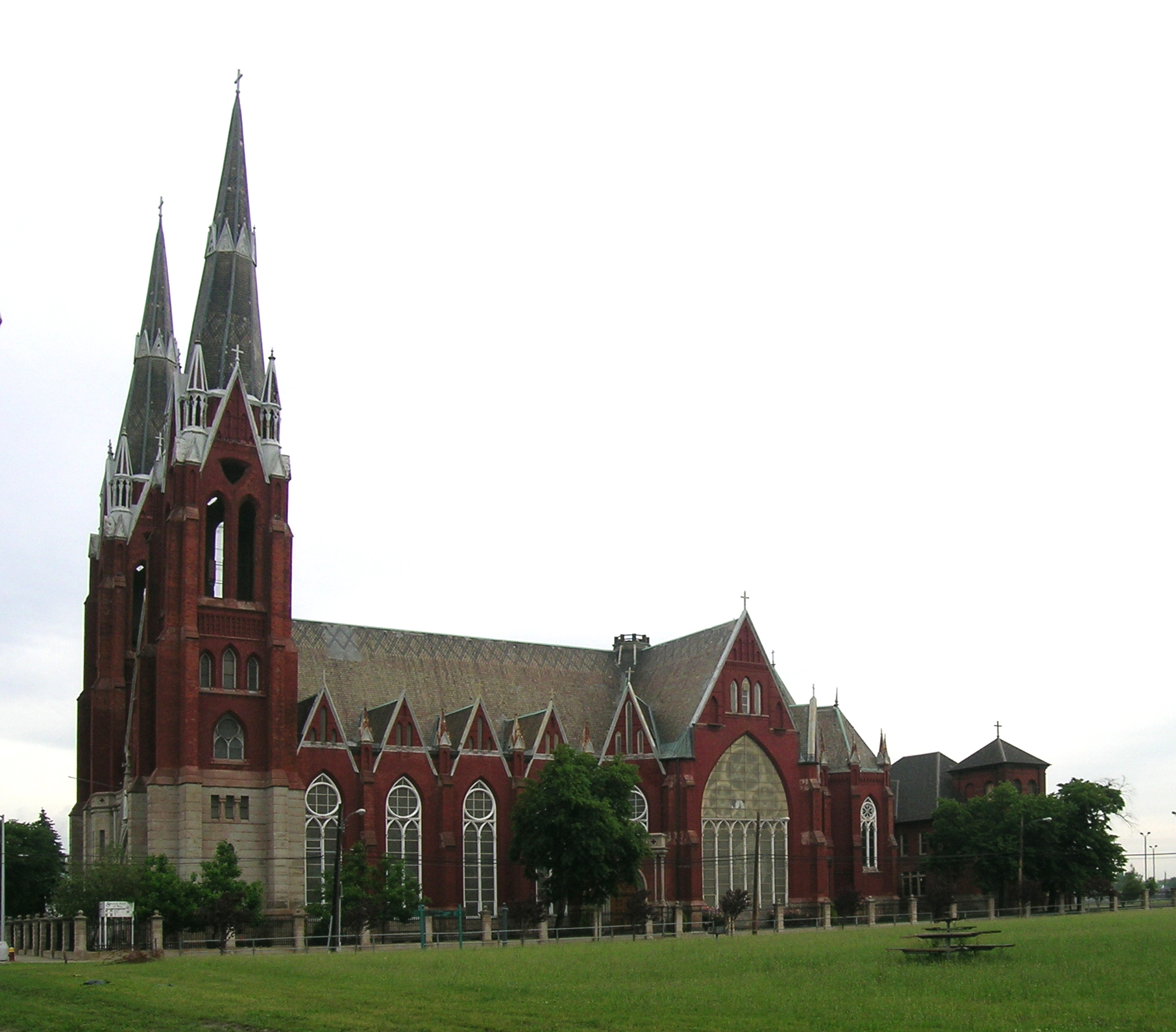
Sweetest Heart of Mary Roman Catholic Church

Kolasinski died in 1898. He was temporarily succeeded by the Kashubian priest Rev. Jan Romuald Byzewski OFM, previously pastor of Detroit's Saint Francis of Assisi Parish. When Father Byzewski rejoined the Franciscan Order in 1899, he was succeeded by the assistant, Rev. Joseph Folta, who served as pastor until 1919. Father Folta built a second school, constructed a permanent rectory, and built an ornamental fence about the church. Folta was succeeded by Rev. Joseph Casimir Plagens, who served at Sweetest Heart from 1919 until 1935, and later became Bishop of Marquette and then Bishop of Grand Rapids. Plagens added embellishments to the church interior and built a permanent convent for the Sisters of St. Joseph, who staffed the parish school.

During Father Plagens's tenure, the parish flourished. The church school was filled with almost 1,500 pupils, and the church was the social as well as spiritual center of the community. Over time, with shifting demographics, membership waned. This trend accelerated through the tenures of the next three pastors: Monsignor Michael Grupa (1935 to 1949), Rev. Adam Koprowski (1949 to 1959), and Rev. Boguslaus Poznański (1959 to 1976). During the 1960s and early 1970s the congregation numbers fell.

In 1976, Rev. Bohdan Kosicki joined Sweetest Heart, began a building restoration, and implemented a plan which revived church membership. He reached out and established ties to earlier parishioners, raising funds for the restoration. Sweetest Heart of Mary was placed on the National Register of Historic Places in 1978. It received state historic designation in 1974, and city of Detroit designation in 1981. A state of Michigan historical marker was also erected in 1981. The stained glass windows and organ were restored, and much of the main altar was renovated. In addition, the convent and fencing were restored, the second school building was demolished, and the historic old school building was stabilized. Kosicki's work was carried on through the tenure of Rev. Alphons Gorecki, who served from 1981 through 2002. Other work included refurbishing the interior, repairing plasterwork and statues, and upgrading electrical wiring.

From 2002 until early 2010, Fr. Mark A. Borkowski was pastor and continued the restoration and revival of Sweetest Heart of Mary. During this period the Annual Pierogi Festival greatly expanded to become the largest religious festival in the City of Detroit. July 1, 2011, Fr. Darrell Roman became the new administrator in addition to being administrator for the other two churches in the cluster, St. Joseph and St. Josaphat.

== Architecture ==
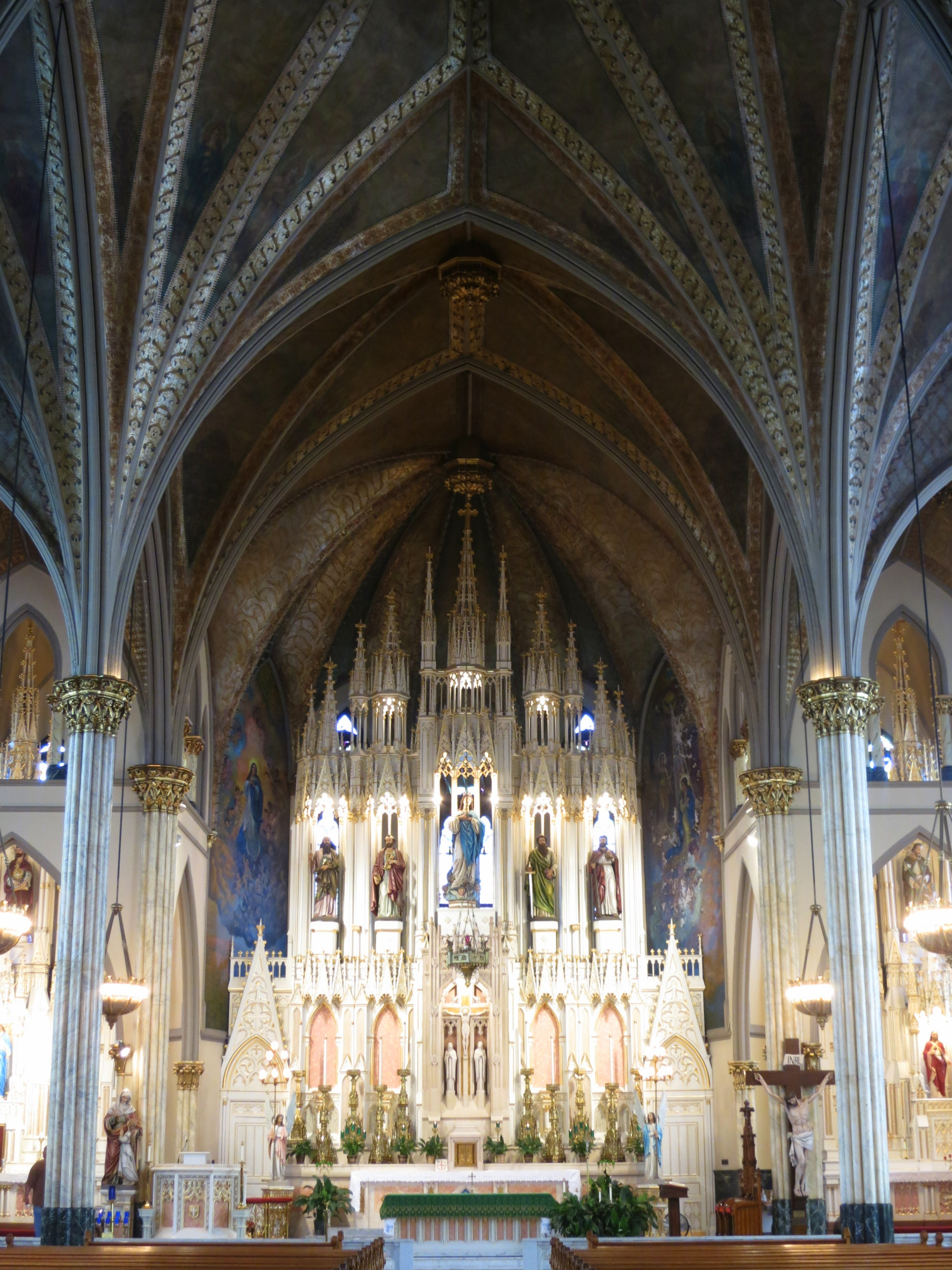
The church sanctuary

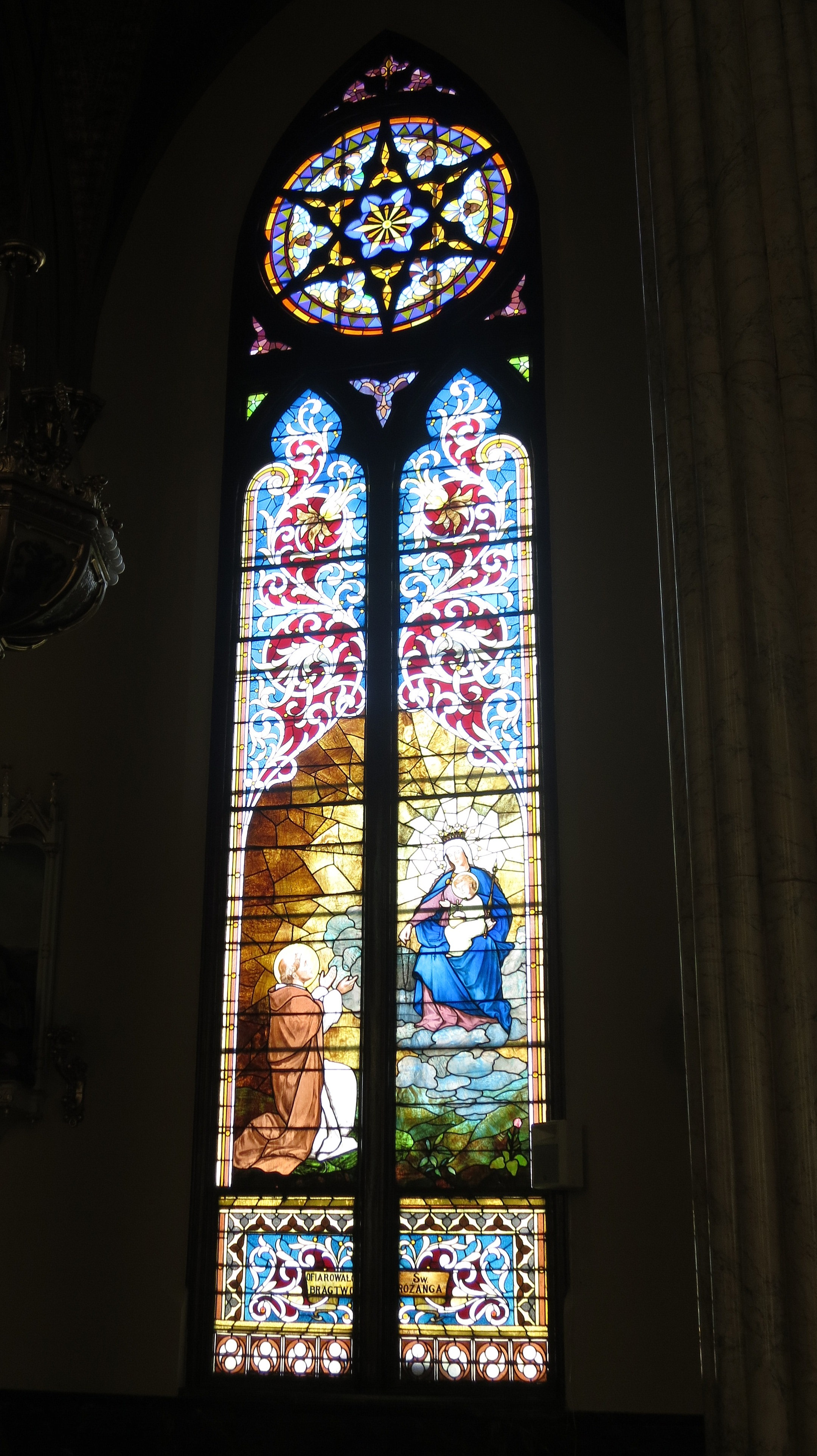
A stained glass window depicting the Blessed Virgin Mary giving the Rosary to Saint Dominic

In 1890, construction began on "what would become the largest Catholic Church in Michigan." Spier and Rohns designed the present structure. Kolasinski had formed the parish and raised the building funds for the rapidly growing parish. The cornerstone-laying ceremony was held on June 5, 1892, and on December 24, 1893, after construction costs of over $125,000, the church was officially dedicated. More than 10,000 people attended the dedication ceremony.

Sweetest Heart of Mary is one of the largest Gothic Revival churches in the Midwest, and perhaps the most impressive. The church is constructed of red brick in a cruciform shape with a cross gabled roof. The facade on Russell boasts a rusticated stone lower level with a triple portal, a pointed arch structure, and a stone balustrade atop everything. Two towers flank the entrance, topped with identical spires, which are capped with buttresses and detailed with crosses.

The church includes several stained glass windows created by Detroit Stained Glass Works, the successor to the firm Friederichs and Staffin. The major transept window illustrates the Holy Family in Saint Joseph's workshop. Eight windows lining the nave portray Christ, Mary, and several saints; this set of windows won a prize at the 1893 World's Columbian Exposition in Chicago.

There are three related buildings—a large rectory, a convent that could house several dozen religious sisters, and a large school building—which make up a local historic district.

The 1893 Austin pipe organ Opus No. 2 (2 manuals and 20 ranks) is the oldest Austin Organ still in service, and the oldest surviving electro-pneumatic in the state of Michigan.

== See also ==
- Archdiocese of Detroit
- Architecture of metropolitan Detroit
