= East Jefferson Avenue Residential TR =

Historic house in Michigan, United States

- U.S. National Register of Historic Places
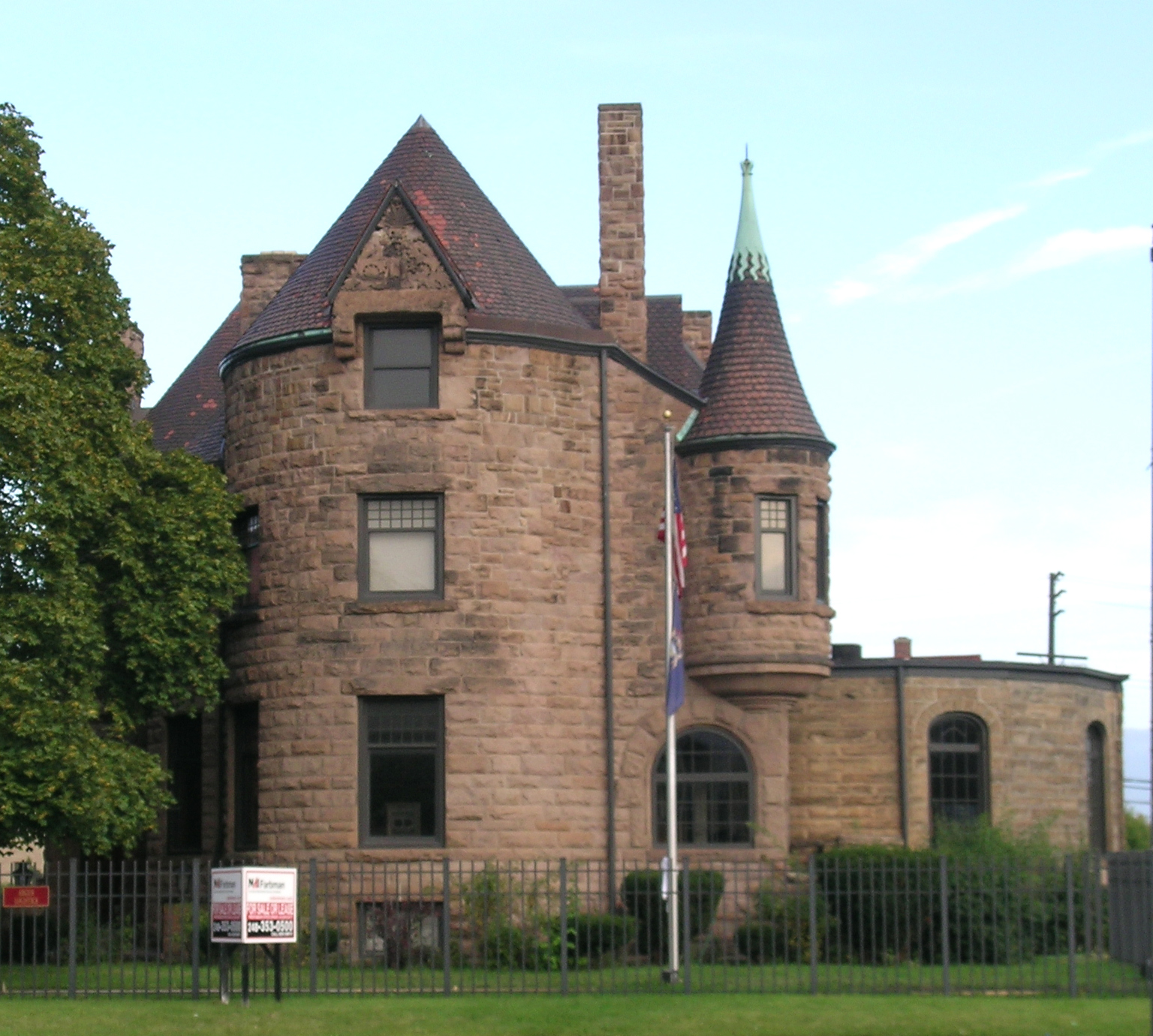
- William H. Wells House
- Location: Detroit, Michigan, U.S.
- Coordinates: 42°20′28″N 83°1′0″W
- Built: 1835–1931
- Architect: Charles N. Agree; Robert O. Derrick; Albert Kahn; Malcomson & Higginbotham; George D. Mason; William Henry Miller; Charles Noble; Shepley, Rutan & Coolidge; Mortimer L. Smith & Sons; J. Will Wilson and Otto Misch
- Architectural style: Gothic Revival, Richardsonian Romanesque, Queen Anne, Italianate, Art Deco, Georgian, Federal, Late 19th and 20th Century Revivals, Renaissance Revival
- MPS: East Jefferson Avenue Residential TR
- NRHP reference No.: 64000324
- Added to NRHP: October 9, 1985

The East Jefferson Avenue Residential District in Detroit, Michigan, includes the Thematic Resource (TR) in the multiple property submission to the National Register of Historic Places which was approved on October 9, 1985. The structures are single-family and multiple-unit residential buildings with construction dates spanning nearly a century, from 1835 to 1931. The area is located on the lower east side of the city.

== History ==
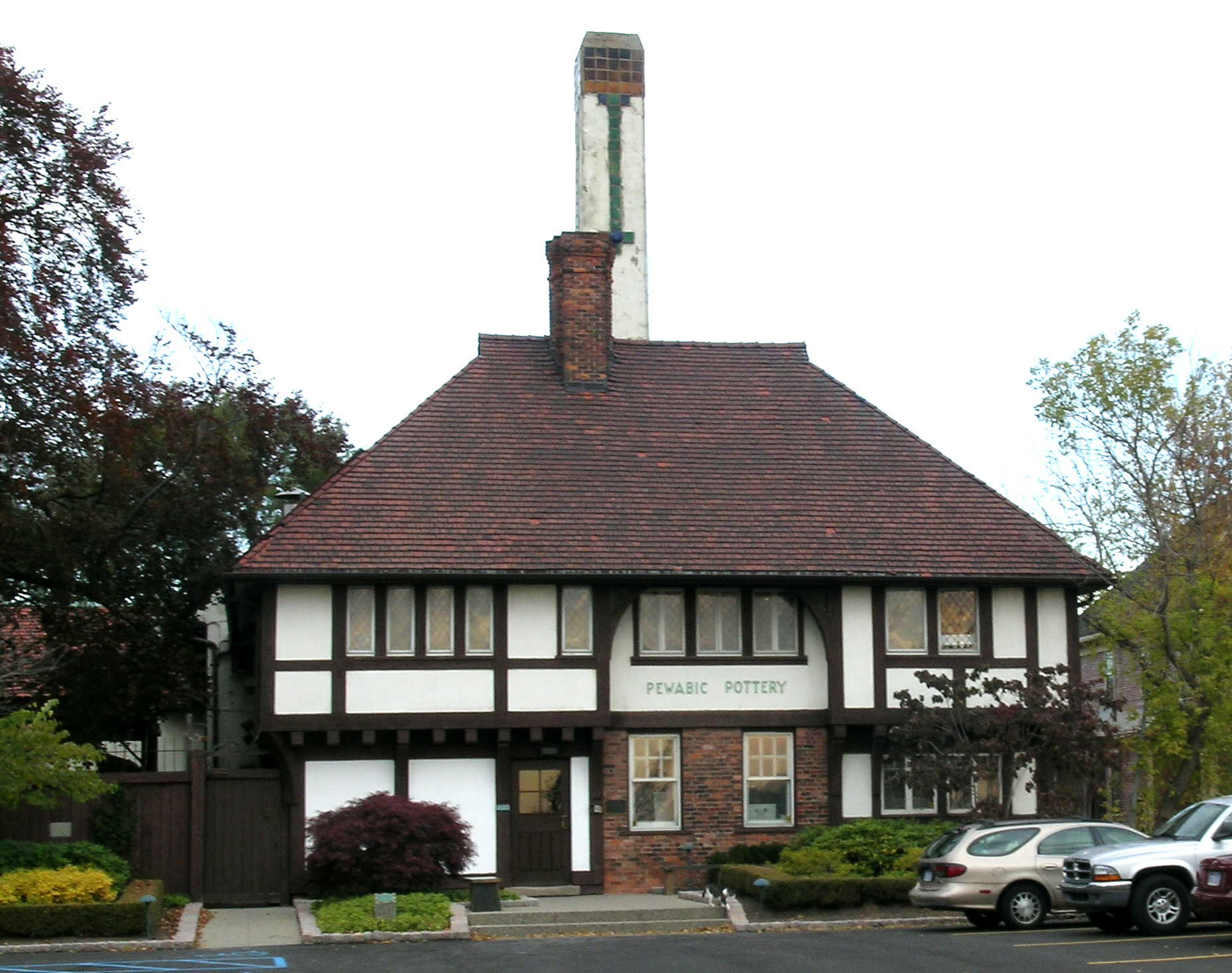
The Pewabic Pottery Museum is a National Historic Landmark along East Jefferson Ave.

The road that is now East Jefferson Avenue existed from the earliest days of Detroit. Then known as the "River Road," it paralleled the Detroit River east of Detroit, connecting the French ribbon farms to Ste. Anne Street in the heart of Detroit. After the disastrous fire of 1805, Judge Augustus Woodward platted out a new design for the city, widening Ste. Anne St. and renaming it (and the connecting River Road) "Jefferson Avenue" in honor of Thomas Jefferson.

Jefferson quickly became the commercial nexus of Detroit; by 1820 over half the businesses on the city were located on the avenue. Additionally, many prominent Detroit residents of the time lived along Jefferson, including Charles Christopher Trowbridge, William Hull, Solomon Sibley, John R. Williams, Antoine Dequindre, Joseph Campau, Oliver Newberry, and Oliver Miller. As Detroit grew and city services expanded, Jefferson was one of the first streets to obtain new installations, getting iron water pipes in 1838, a horse-drawn bus line in 1847, horse-drawn rail in 1863, electric arc lighting in 1883, and asphalt pavement in 1892.

After the Civil War, many newly prosperous Detroit citizens built homes along Jefferson in a variety of popular architectural styles, including Gothic Revival, Richardsonian Romanesque, Queen Anne, and Italianate.

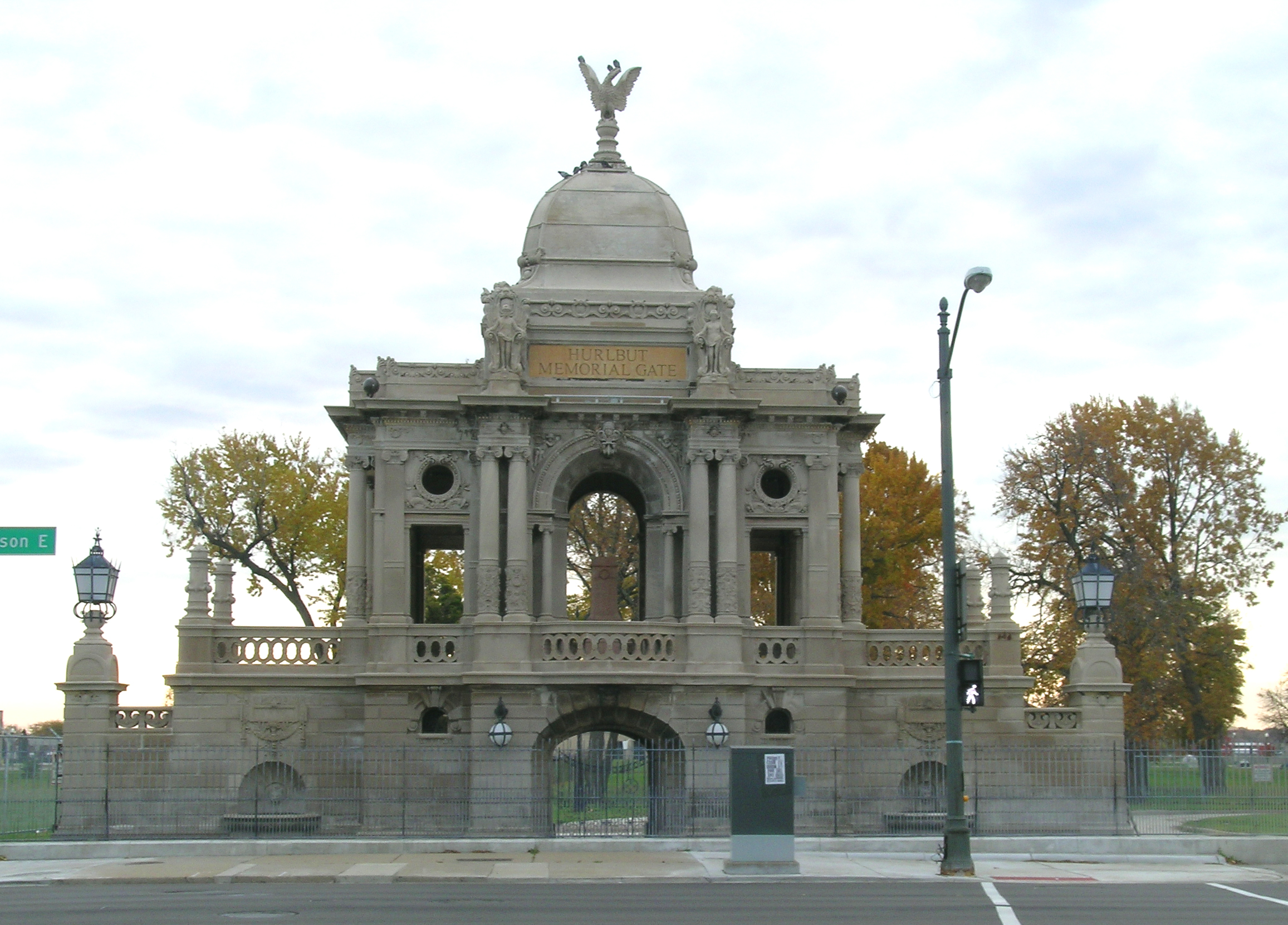
Chauncey Hurlbut Memorial Gate (1894) - restored in 2007. East Jefferson at Cadillac Blvd.

As the 19th century drew to a close and the 20th century began, the area around Jefferson Avenue became more industrialized. Wealthy residents, spurred by the availability of streetcar lines (and later, the automobiles), moved farther from the city center, leaving Jefferson Avenue behind. However, the booming city economy and influx of new residents in the 1910s increased demand for new housing. East Jefferson Avenue became an epicenter for new luxury apartment buildings, built particularly in the 1920s and 1930s.

Following World War II, East Jefferson became more commercial with the introduction of modern commercial structures. Yet, East Jefferson contains clusters of preserved historic structures.

== Gallery of Lost Residences ==
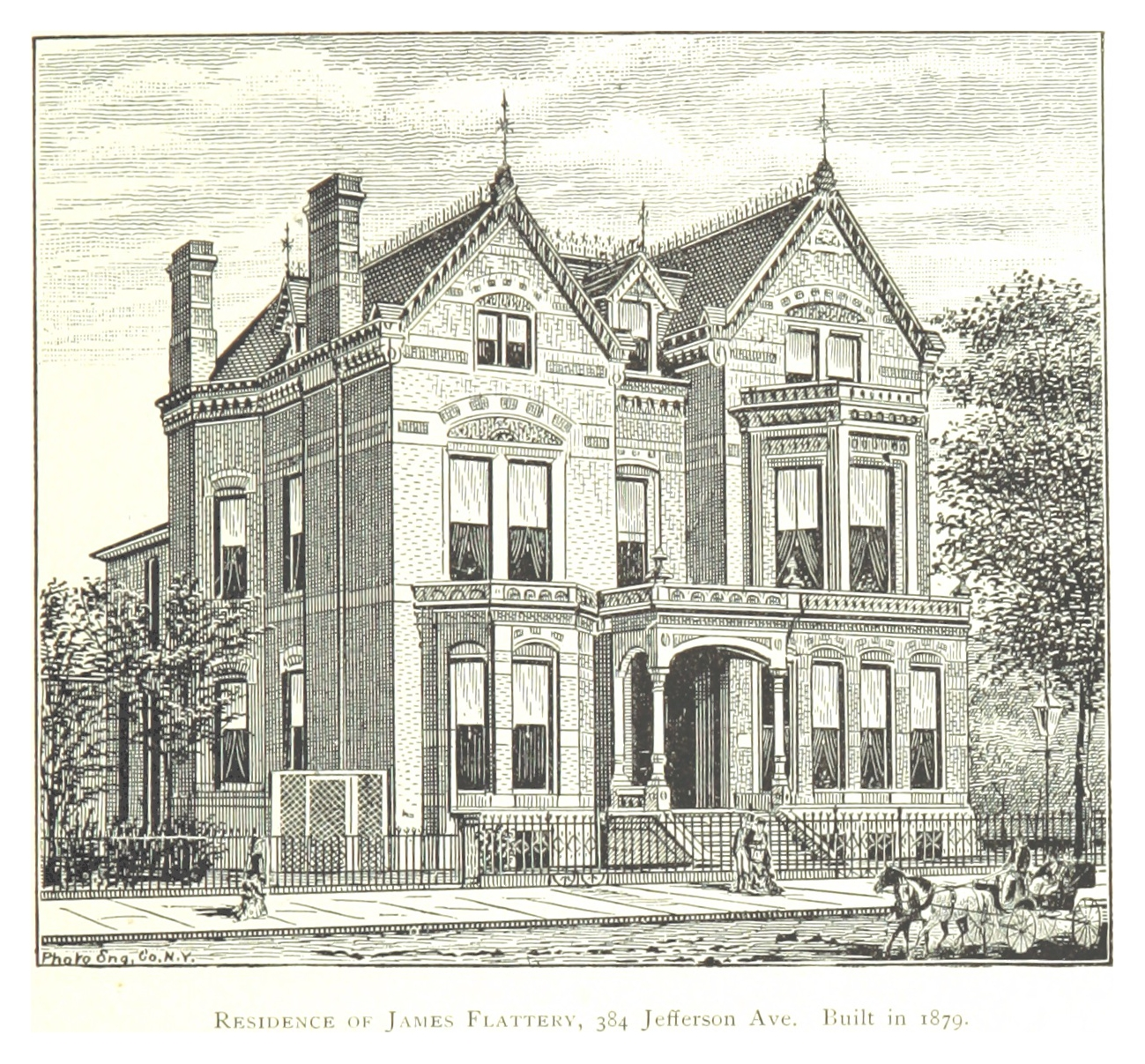
James Flattery House built in 1879 and designed by the architect Mortimer L Smith, was demolished in 1960s.

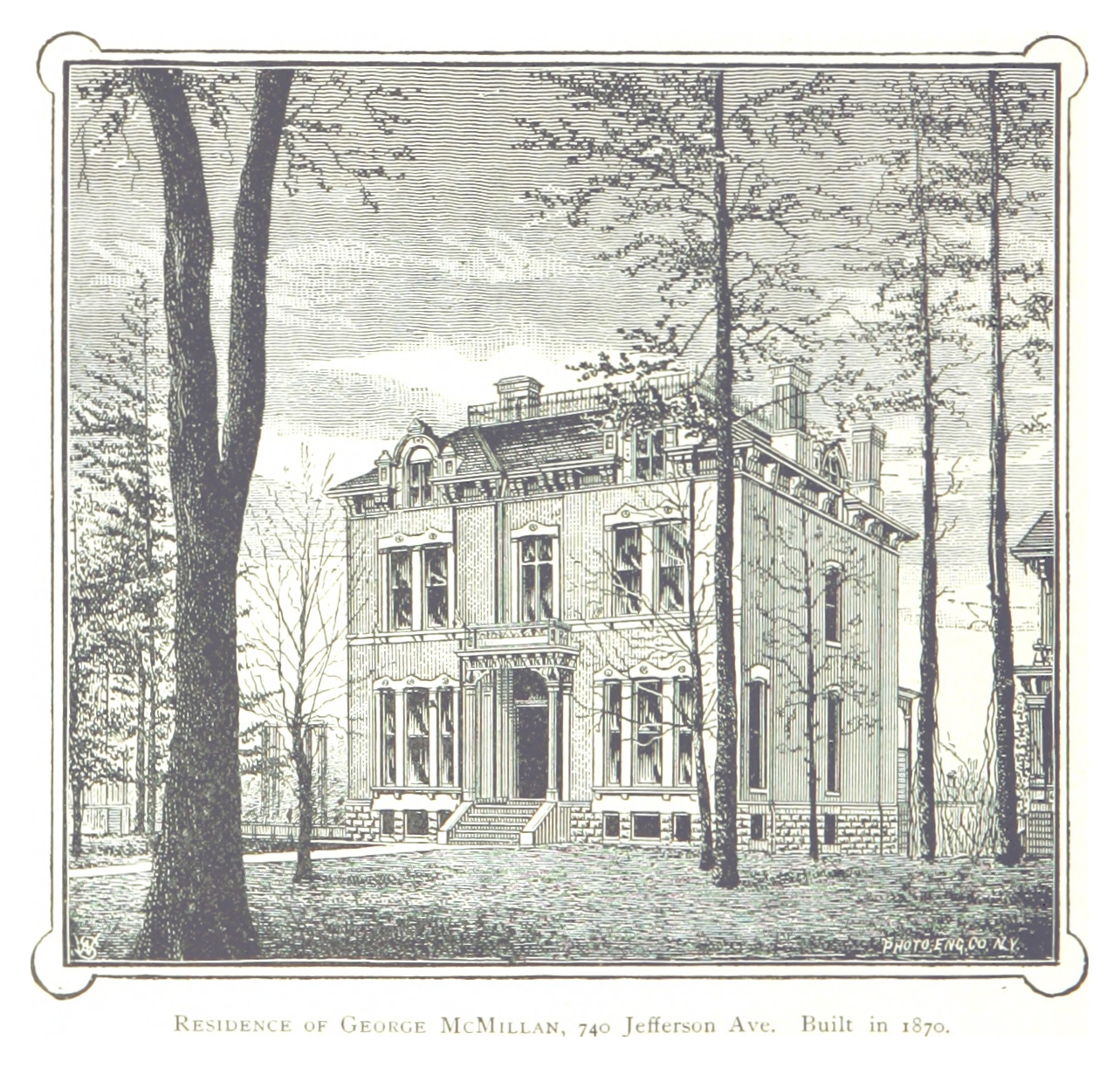
George McMillan residence built in 1870 and demolished in 1950s.

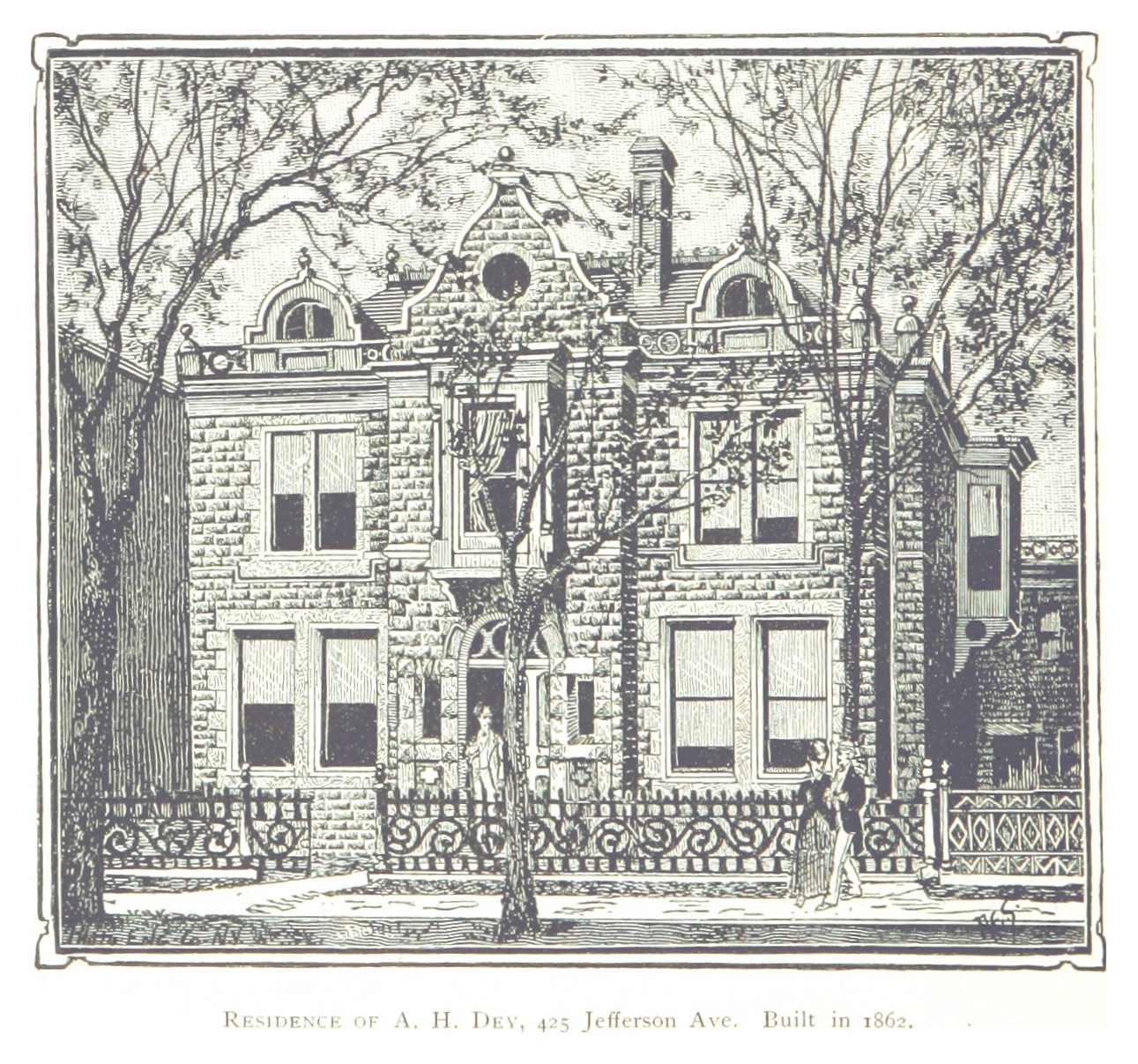
Alexander H Dey residence built in 1862 and designed by Gordon W Lloyd.

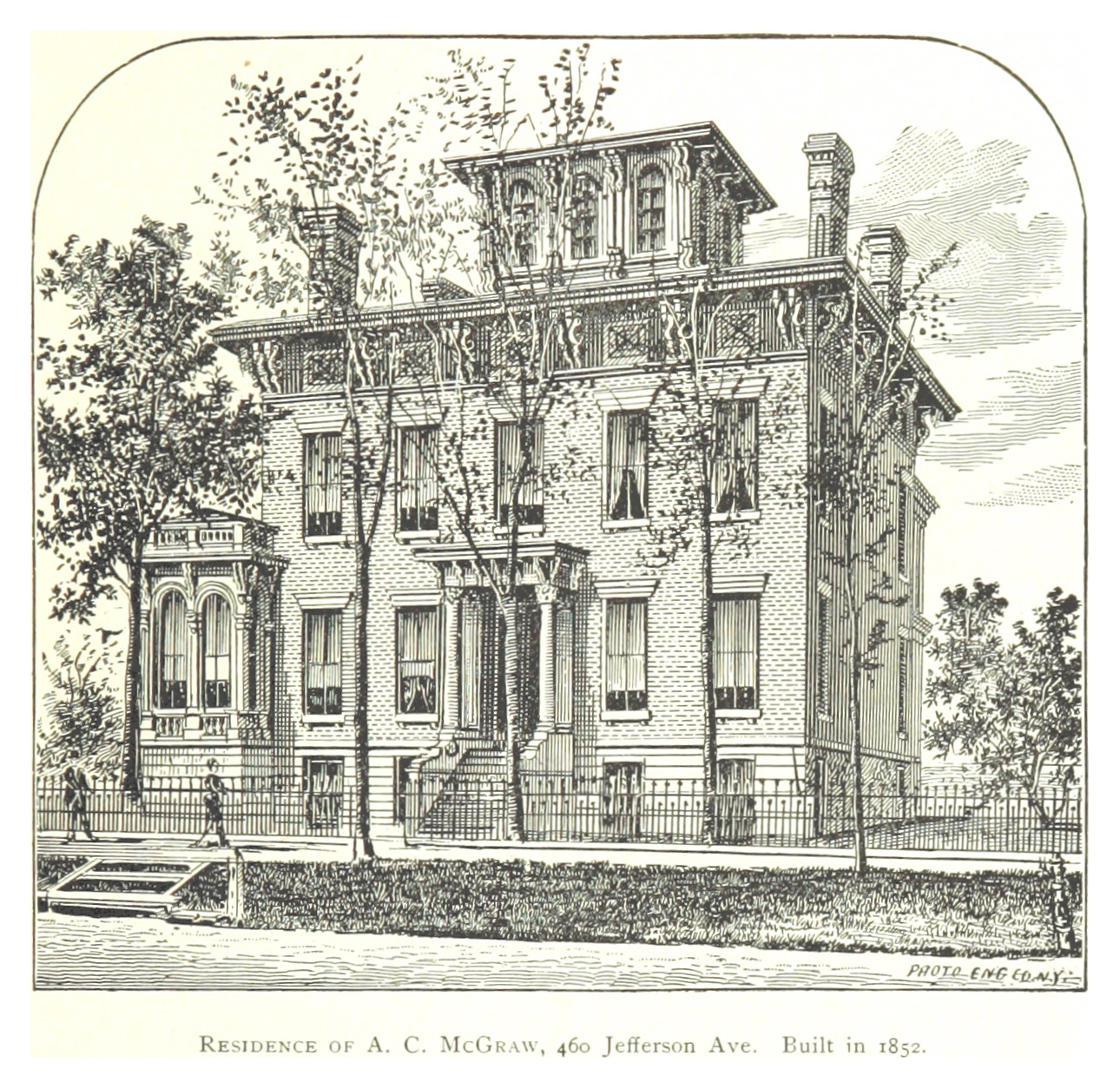
A.C McGraw residence built in 1852 and demolished in 1940s.

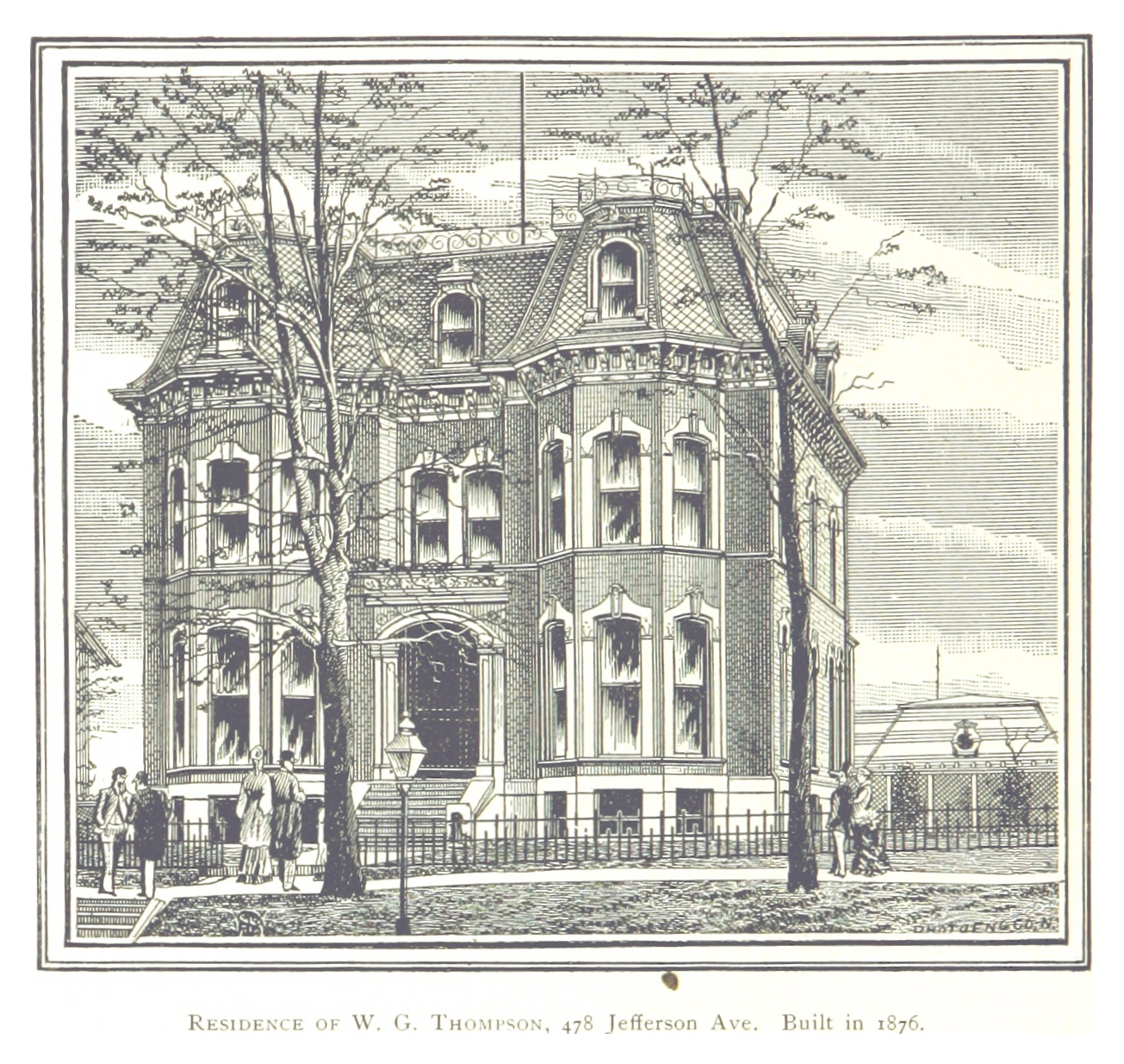
William G Thompson residence built in 1876 and demolished in 1920.

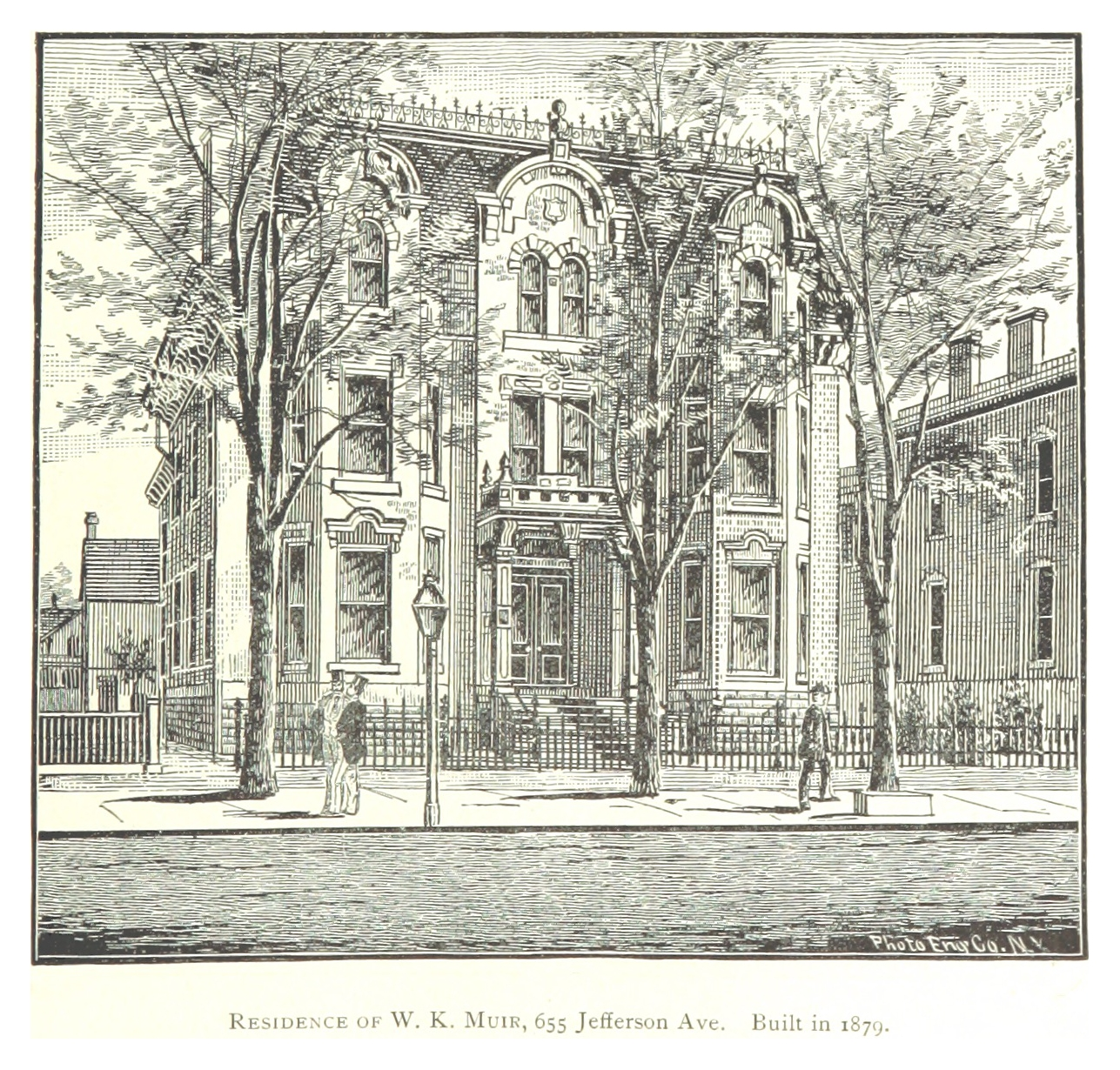
William K Muir residence built in 1879 and designed by the architect Henry T Brush, was demolished in 1929.

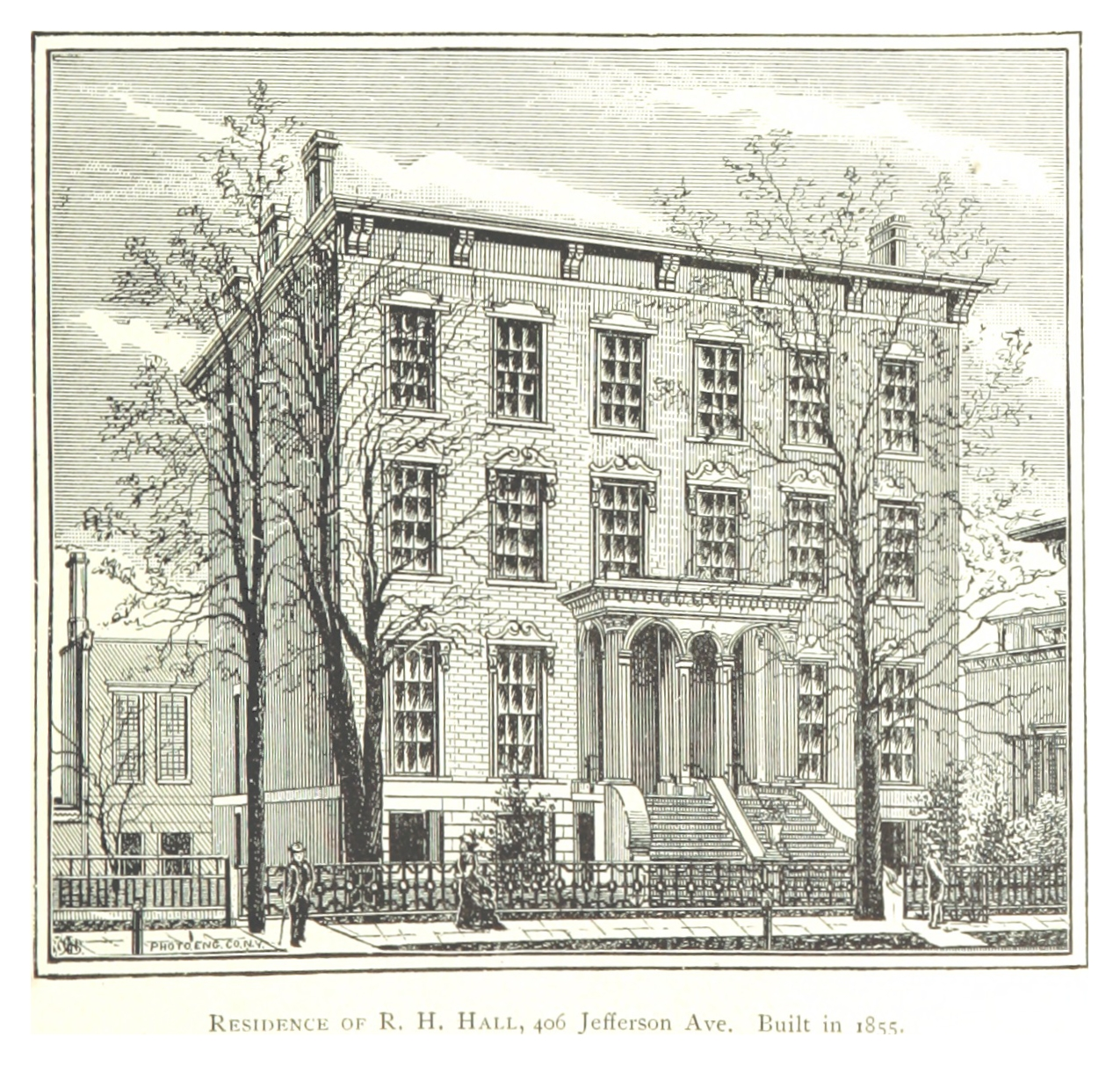
Double residence of Richard H Hall built in 1855 and demolished in 1960s for the Chrysler Freeway

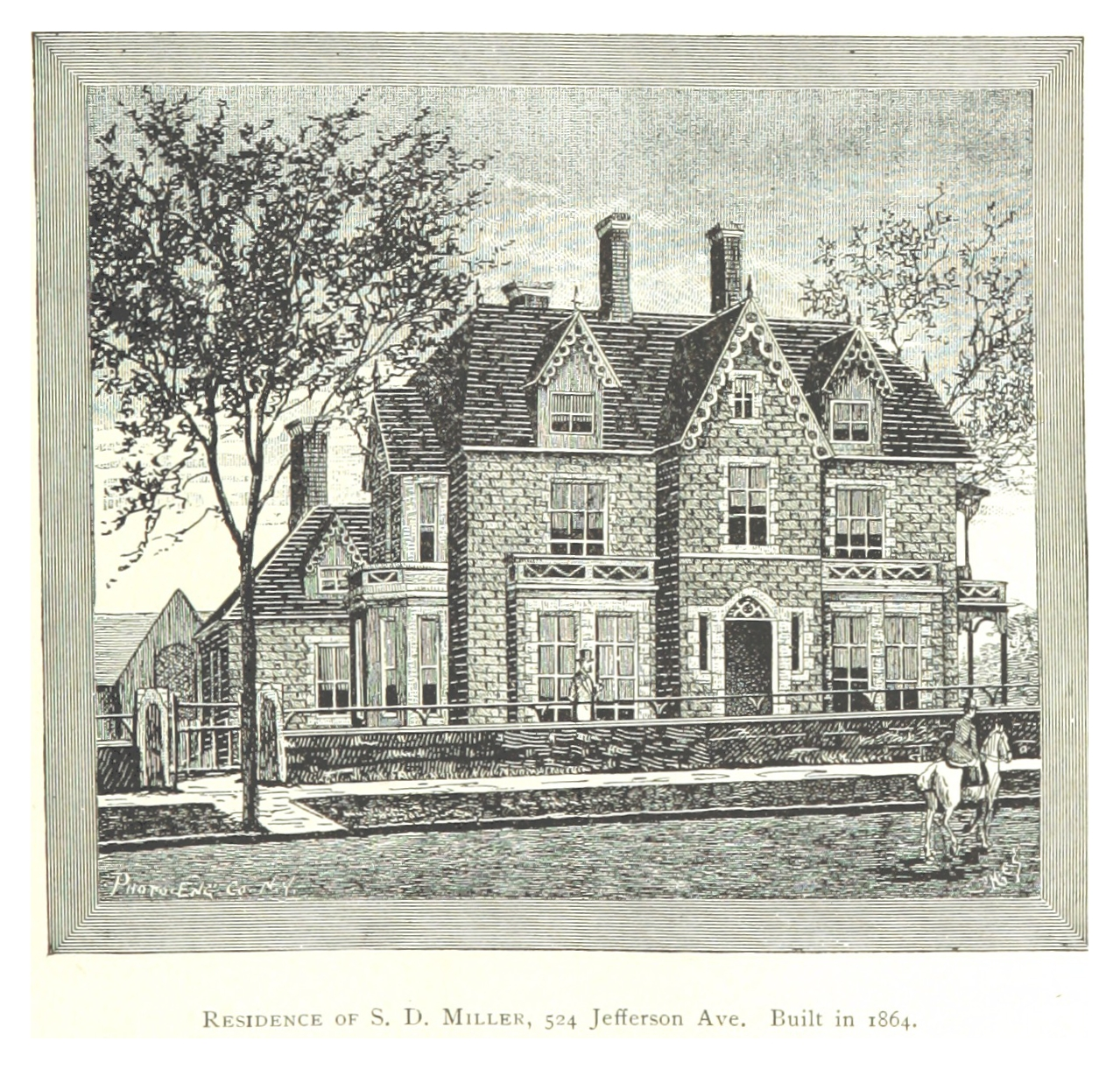
Sidney D Miller residence built in 1864 and designed by Gordon W Lloyd, was demolished in 1955.

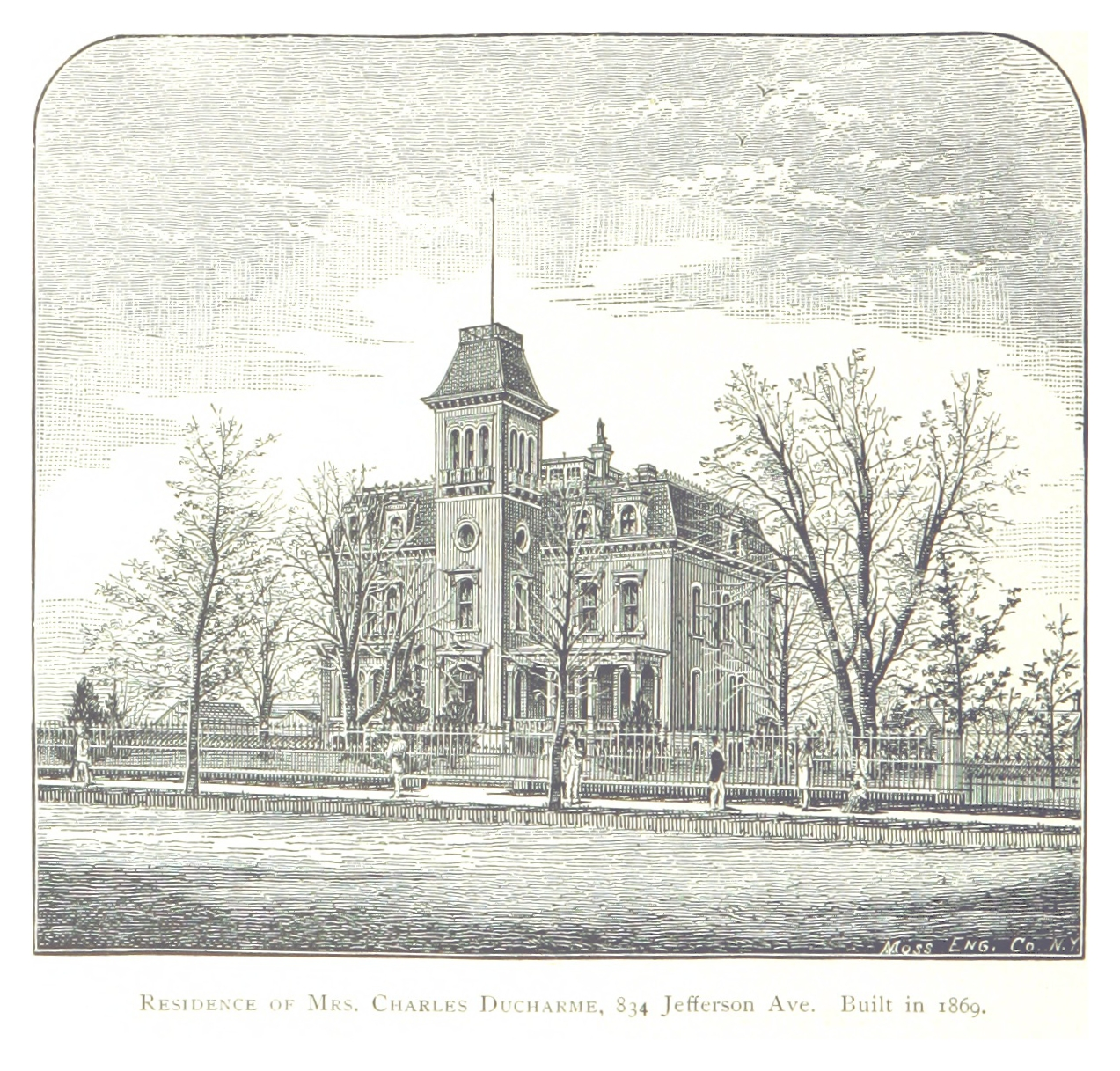
Charles DuCharme residence built in 1869 and designed by Mortimer L Smith, was demolished in 1948.

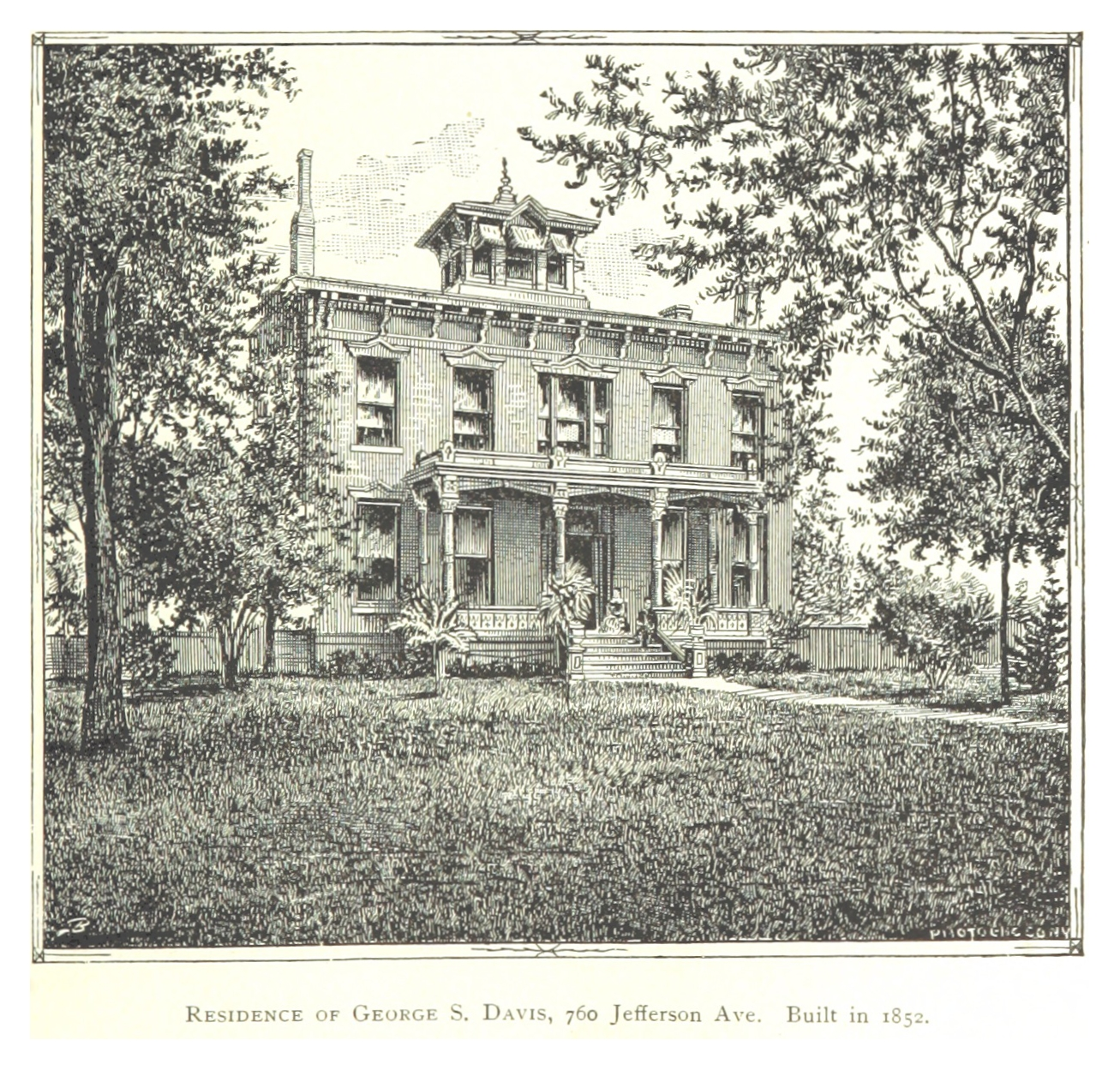
Residence of G.S Davis built in 1852 and demolished in 1910s

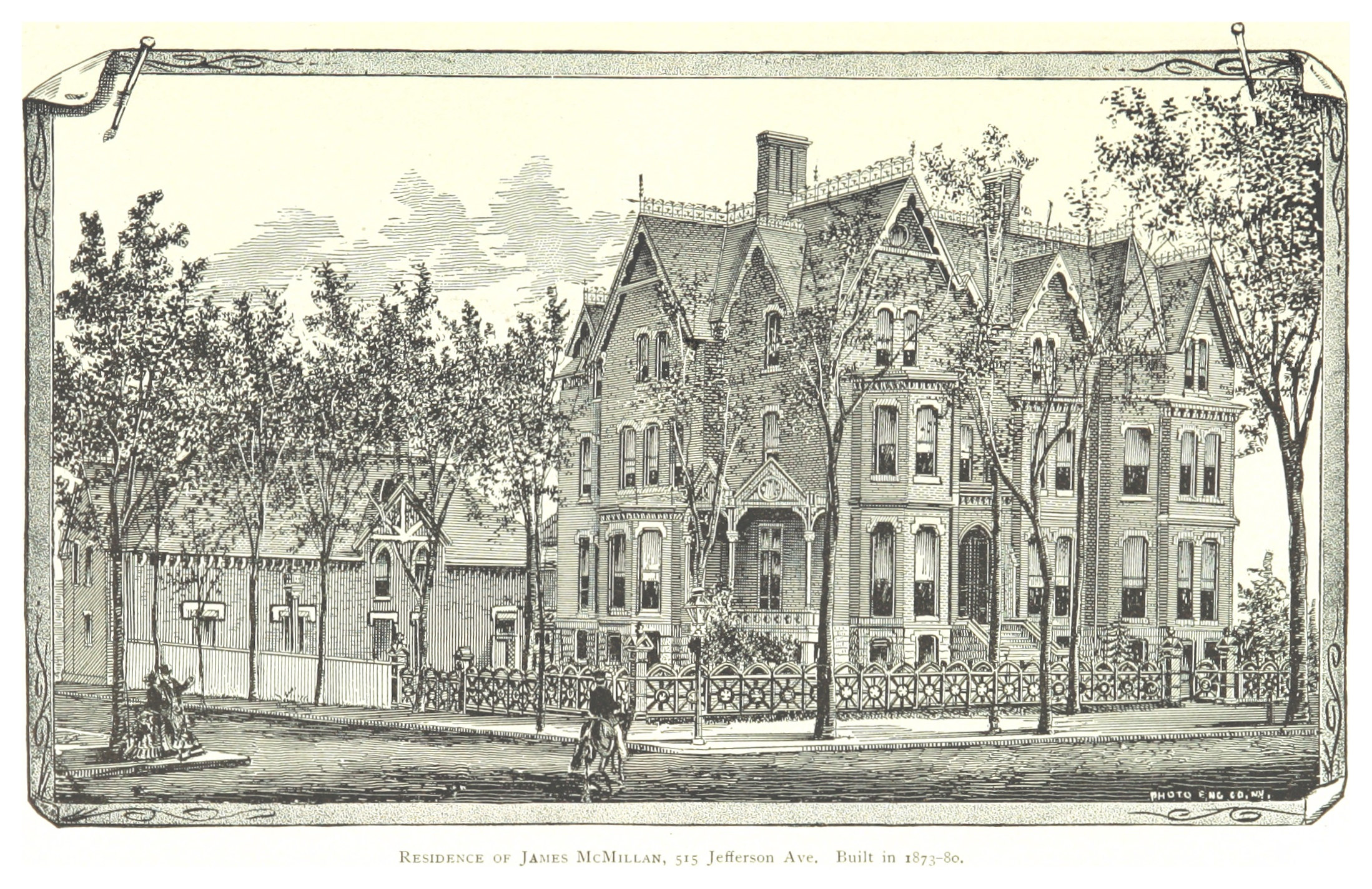
James McMillan House built in 1873 and designed by Gordon W Lloyd, was demolished in 1931.

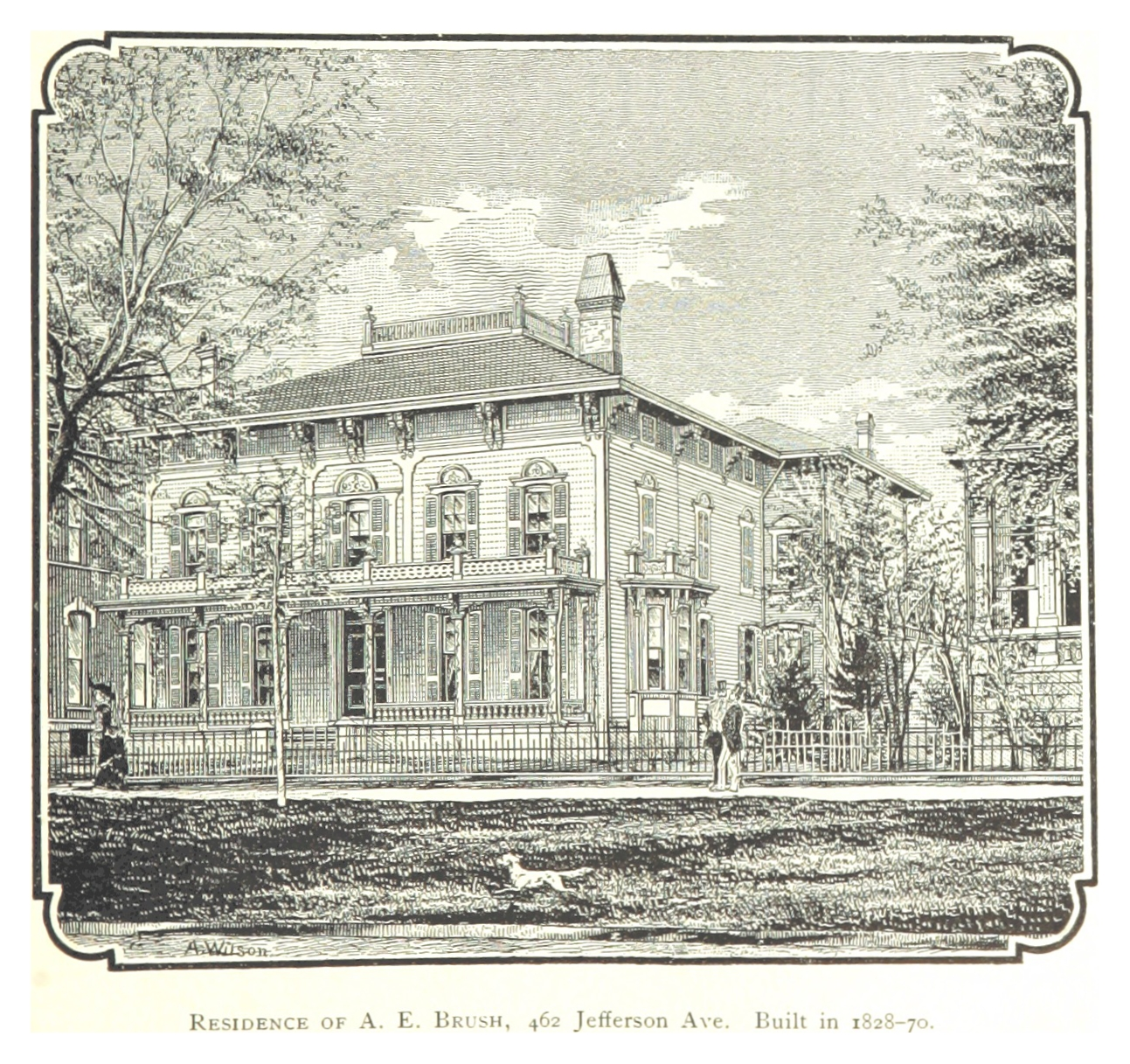
Alfred Erskine Brush residence built in 1828 and demolished in 1890s.

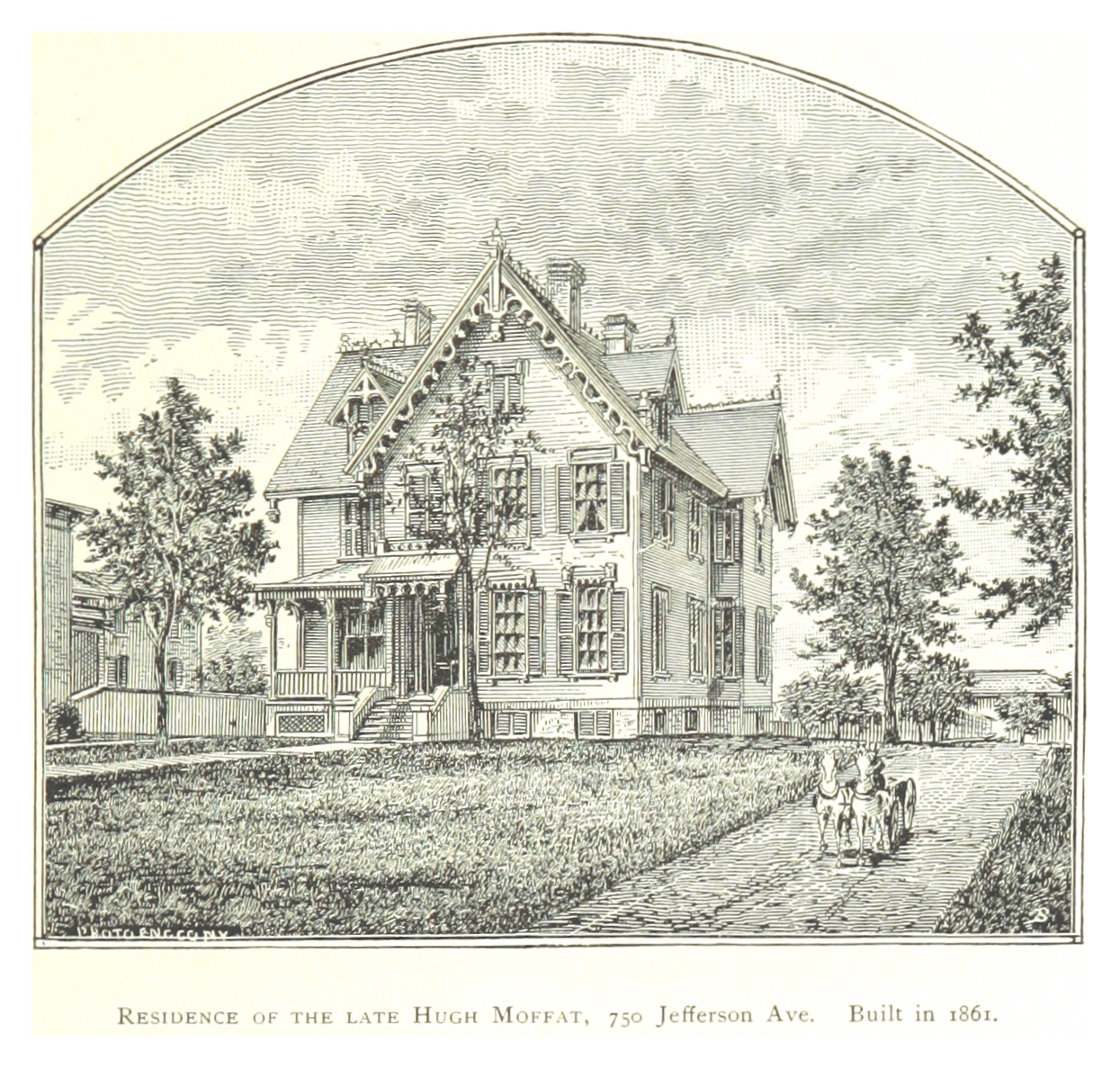
Hugh Moffat residence built in 1861 and demolished in 1940s.

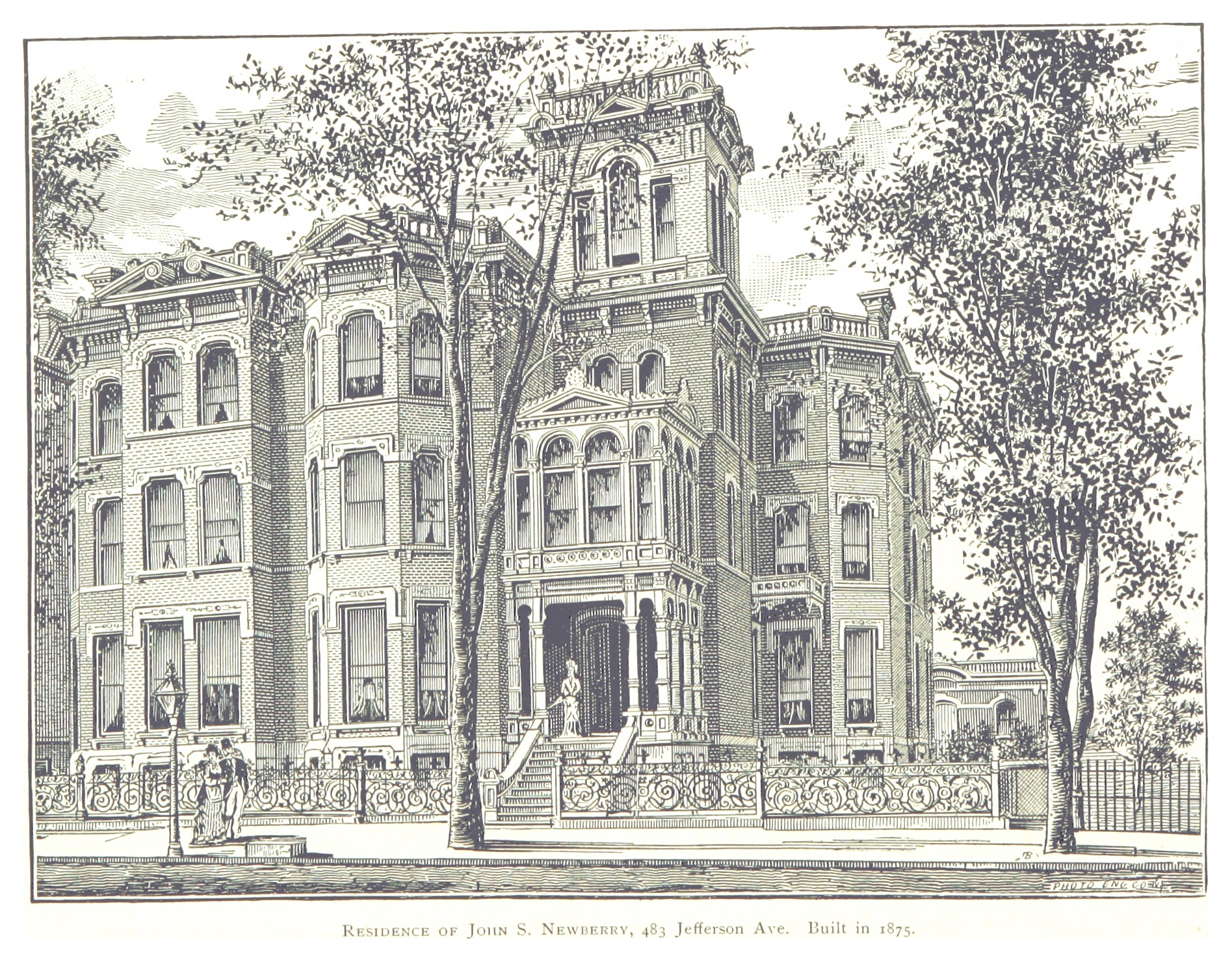
John S Newberry residence built in 1875 and designed by Gordon W Lloyd, was demolished in 1961.

== Architecture ==
The Thematic Resource includes twenty-eight architecturally and historically significant structures, stretching along a scenic three-mile section of East Jefferson Avenue beginning just east of downtown Detroit. Each of the structures included are, in some way, representative of the "high style" architecture of the period. The structures listed have a high degree of architectural integrity, with building alteration primarily confined to interior remodeling or additions; in all buildings, the Jefferson Avenue façade remains substantially intact. Four of the historic structures along East Jefferson listed on the T.R. have been demolished after their addition to the Register.

The structures included are as follows:

Resource name	Image	Address	Built	Architect	Notes
Alden Park Towers		8100 East Jefferson Avenue	1923	Edwin Rorke	
John N. Bagley House		2921 East Jefferson Avenue	1889	Rogers and MacFarlane	
Joseph Campau House		2910 East Jefferson Avenue	1835	Unknown	
Garden Court Apartments		2900 East Jefferson Avenue	1915	Albert Kahn	
Hibbard Apartment Building		8905 East Jefferson Avenue	1924	Robert O. Derrick	
The Kean		8925 East Jefferson Avenue	1931	Charles Noble	
Manchester Apartments		2016 East Jefferson Avenue	1915	Unknown	
The Palms		1001 East Jefferson Avenue	1903	Albert Kahn	
Arthur M. Parker House		8115 East Jefferson Avenue	1901	Malcomson & Higginbotham	
Pasadena Apartments		2170 East Jefferson Avenue	1902	Mortimer L. Smith & Sons	
Somerset Apartments		1523 East Jefferson Avenue	1922	Unknown	
Frederick K. Stearns House		8109 East Jefferson Avenue	1902	Stratton & Baldwin	
William H. Wells House		2931 East Jefferson Avenue	1889	William Henry Miller	
The Whittier		415 Burns Drive	1922, 1926	Charles N. Agree	

In addition, the following nine residential structures were previously listed on the NRHP, either individually or as part of an historic district:

Resource Name	Image	Address	Built	Architect	Notes
Croul-Palms House		1394 East Jefferson Avenue	1881	William Scott	
Thomas A. Parker House		975 East Jefferson Avenue	1868	Gordon W. Lloyd	
Charles Trowbridge House		1380 East Jefferson Avenue	1826	Unknown	Oldest surviving building in Detroit.
Moross House		1460 East Jefferson Avenue	1855	Christopher Moross	
Edwin Nelson House		8311 East Jefferson Avenue			Part of the Indian Village Historic District
James Hamilton House		8325 East Jefferson Avenue	1902	Stratton & Baldwin	Part of the Indian Village Historic District
William F. Harris House		8335 East Jefferson Avenue			Part of the Indian Village Historic District
Mary S. Smith House		8445 East Jefferson Avenue			Part of the Indian Village Historic District
James Burgess Book Jr. House		8469 East Jefferson Avenue	1911	Louis Kamper	Part of the Indian Village Historic District.

== Significance ==
The structures in this Thematic Resource vary greatly in style, construction, and use, but all are related by the common theme of residential development and general upper-class nature. Each of the structures included are, in some way, representative of the "high style" architecture of the period. The structures are divided into four groups, according to their original use and construction date.

The first group includes the single-family residences built by prominent Detroit citizens before the Civil War. This group includes the Joseph Campau House (1835) and the Alexander Chene House (1855) listed in this T.R., as well as the Charles Trowbridge House (1826) and the Moross House (1855), both listed on the NRHP at an earlier date. These structures are distinguished by their relatively modest appearance, although at the time of their construction they were fashionable homes housing prominent Detroit citizens.

The second group includes the single-family residences built by wealthy Detroiters in the latter part of the 19th century and in the early 20th century. This group includes the John N. Bagley House (1889), the William H. Wells House (1889), the Franklin H. Walker House (1896), the Arthur M. Parker House (1901), and the Frederick K. Stearns House (1902), all listed in this T.R., as well as the Thomas A. Parker House (1868), the Croul-Palms House (1881), and homes in the Indian Village Historic District which were listed on the NRHP at an earlier date. These architect-designed structures are distinguished by their elaborate and expensive construction and exemplification of popular architectural styles.

The third group includes the large-scale luxury apartment buildings built in the early 20th century. These large, luxurious apartment buildings were the first multiple-unit structures to make inroads into the previously exclusive single-family residential East Jefferson neighborhood, with the Pasadena Apartments (1902) and The Palms (1903) being the earliest examples. The larger apartment buildings continued to be constructed along Jefferson, with the much larger Garden Court Apartments (1915), the Whittier Hotel (1922–1926), and the Alden Park Towers (1922) built over the next two decades, and The Kean (1931) built just as the Great Depression halted construction for years. These structures are distinguished by their relatively large size and (originally) sizable and luxurious apartments.

The fourth group includes the more modest (but still well-appointed) smaller scale apartment buildings constructed in the 1910s and 1920s to cater to more upper-middle-class tenants such as automobile company workers and professionals. This group includes the Manchester Apartments (1915), Jefferson Hall (1916), the Ponchartrain Apartments (1920), the Chateau Frontenac Apartments (1925), the Somerset Apartments (1922), and the Hibbard Apartment Building (1924). These structures are distinguished by their smaller scale and less well-appointed but still high quality rooms.
