= Pontchartrain =

Pontchartrain may refer to:

== People ==
- Jérôme Phélypeaux, comte de Pontchartrain, French statesman (1674–1747), the son of
- Louis Phélypeaux (1643-1727), comte de Pontchartrain, French statesman

== Places ==
- Fort Detroit (Fort Pontchartrain du Détroit), Detroit, Michigan
- Lake Pontchartrain, Louisiana
- Pontchartrain Park, New Orleans, Louisiana
- Jouars-Pontchartrain, Yvelines, France, place of origin of the Phélypeaux family
- Ponchartrain Apartments, Detroit, Michigan.

== Architecture ==
- Château de Pontchartrain, in the city of Jouars-Pontchartrain
- Pontchartrain Expressway, Louisiana
- Lake Pontchartrain Causeway, Louisiana
- Pontchartrain Hotel, New Orleans, Louisiana
- Pontchartrain Rail-Road, Louisiana
- Fort Pontchartrain a Wyndham Hotel, Detroit

== Ships ==
- CSS Pontchartrain, launched 1859, served in the American Civil War
- USCGC Pontchartrain, launched 1928, served in World War II
- USCGC Pontchartrain, launched 1944, served in the Cold War
