= The Kean =

- U.S. National Register of Historic Places
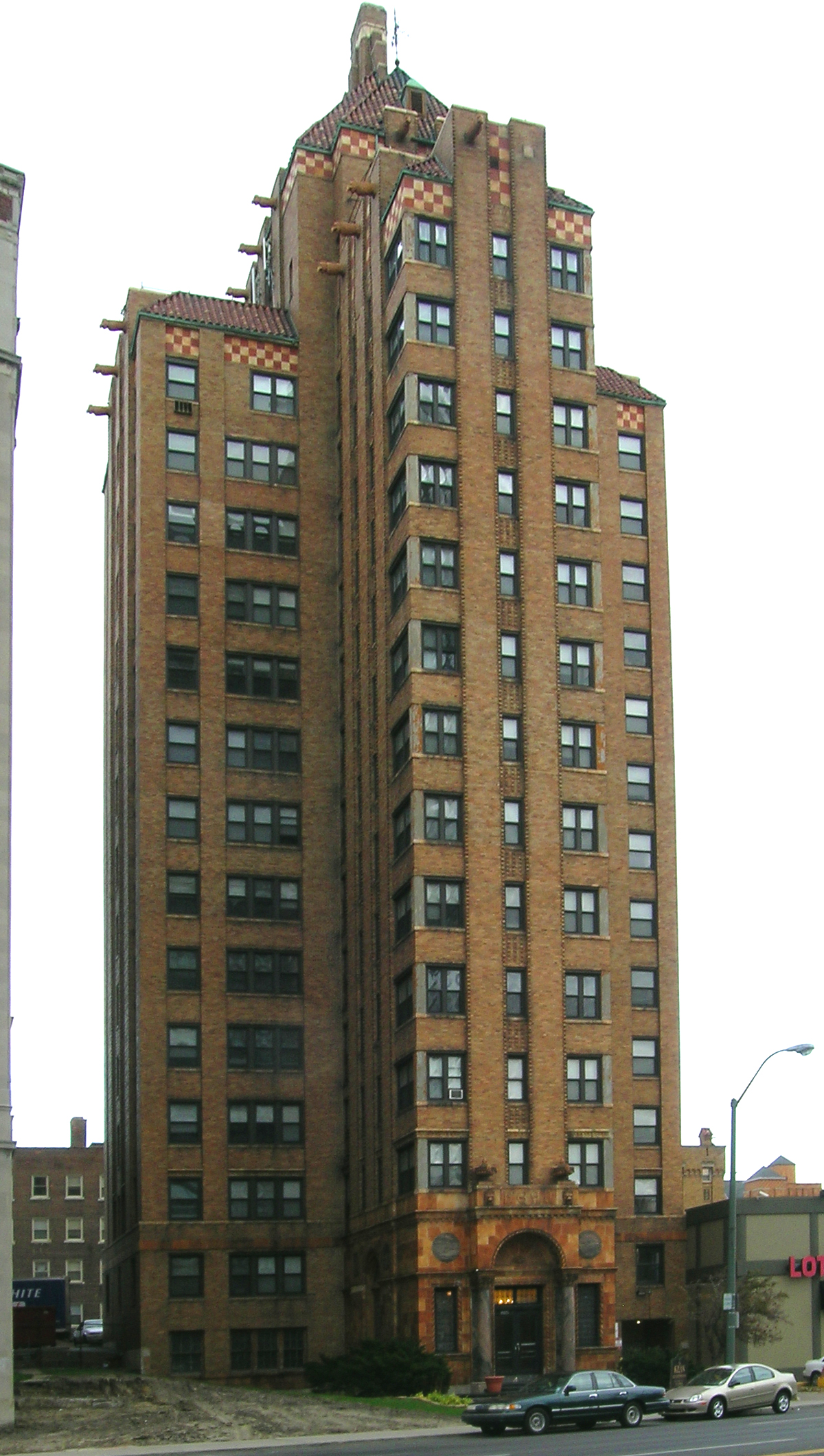
- Interactive map
- Location: 8925 East Jefferson Avenue; Detroit, Michigan
- Coordinates: 42°21′27″N 82°59′12″W
- Built: 1931
- Architect: Charles Noble
- Architectural style: Art Deco
- MPS: East Jefferson Avenue Residential TR
- NRHP reference No.: 85002940
- Added to NRHP: October 09, 1985

The Kean is an apartment building located at 8925 East Jefferson Avenue in Detroit, Michigan, directly adjacent to the Hibbard Apartment Building. It was listed on the National Register of Historic Places in 1985.

== Description ==
The Kean is a striking Art Deco apartment building containing some Romanesque elements. The building is sixteen stories high, containing four apartments per floor. The main structure is brick; the entrance is embellished with light orange terra cotta, inset medallions, and Corinthian columns. The vertical surfaces rise the full height of the building. The hipped roof is tiled, and edged with a red and white checkerboard pattern and projecting gargoyles.

== History ==
The Kean was designed by Charles Noble in 1931. With the onset of the Great Depression, this was the last of the large residential apartments built along Jefferson until well after World War II. The building is currently operated as an apartment building.
