= Alexander Chene House =

Historic house in Michigan, United States

- Alexander Chêne House
- U.S. National Register of Historic Places
- Michigan State Historic Site
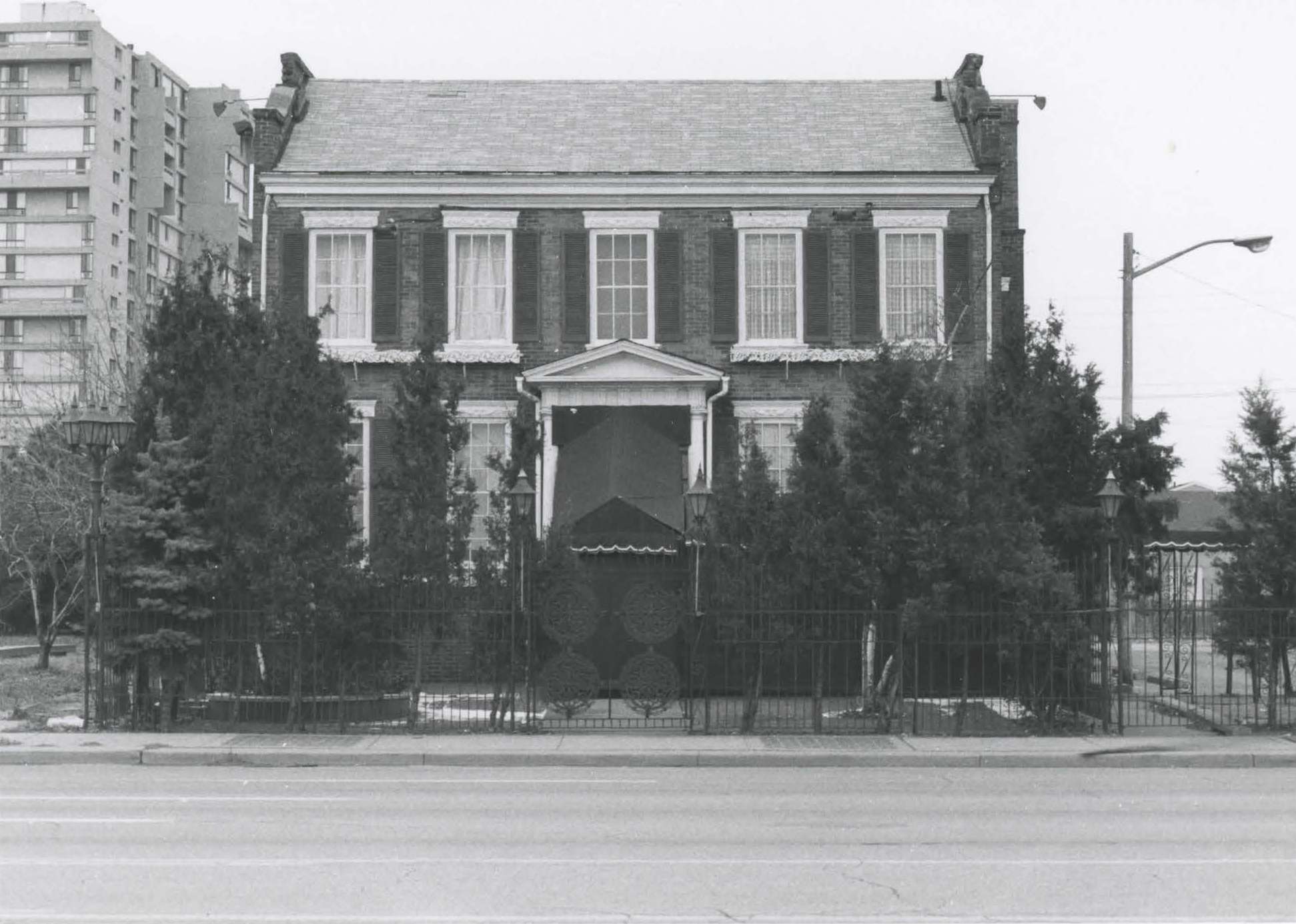
- Alexander Chene House, 1983
- Interactive map
- Location: 2681 East Jefferson Avenue, Detroit, Michigan
- Coordinates: 42°20′21″N 83°1′17″W
- Built: 1855
- Architectural style: Federal
- Demolished: April 1991
- MPS: East Jefferson Avenue Residential TR
- NRHP reference No.: 85002936

Significant dates
- Added to NRHP: October 9, 1985
- Designated MSHS: January 17, 1986

The Alexander Chêne House was a private residence located at 2681 East Jefferson Avenue in Detroit, Michigan. It was listed on the National Register of Historic Places in 1985 and designated a Michigan State Historic Site in 1986, but subsequently demolished in April 1991.

== Description ==
The Alexander Chêne House was a two-story, Federal-style house with additional Colonial Revival details on the facade, added after original construction. The house was constructed of red brick sitting on a raised basement. A one-story porch sat in the center of the front facade, and the side walls rose above the roof to form fractables. A small cornice ran the width of the front. The windows were topped with decorative iron lintels. A rear extension was added to the house in the 20th century.

== History ==
The Chêne House was one of the few examples of the Federal style in Detroit. It was built in 1850 by Alexander Chêne on land which had been granted to the Chêne family by Louis XIV of France in 1707. The house was later owned by Charles B. Warren, who constructed the rear wing some time between 1902 and 1914.

The house was later used as a fraternity house for the University of Detroit, and during Prohibition was a speakeasy. Starting in 1935, the house was used as a fine dining restaurant, known as Little Harry's. The restaurant went through a series of owners, and closed in 1990. It was sold to singer Anita Baker, and in 1991, the structure was demolished and replaced with a franchise International House of Pancakes (IHOP).

== Gallery ==
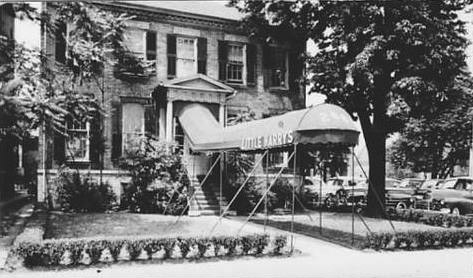
Little Harry's Restaurant, c. 1930

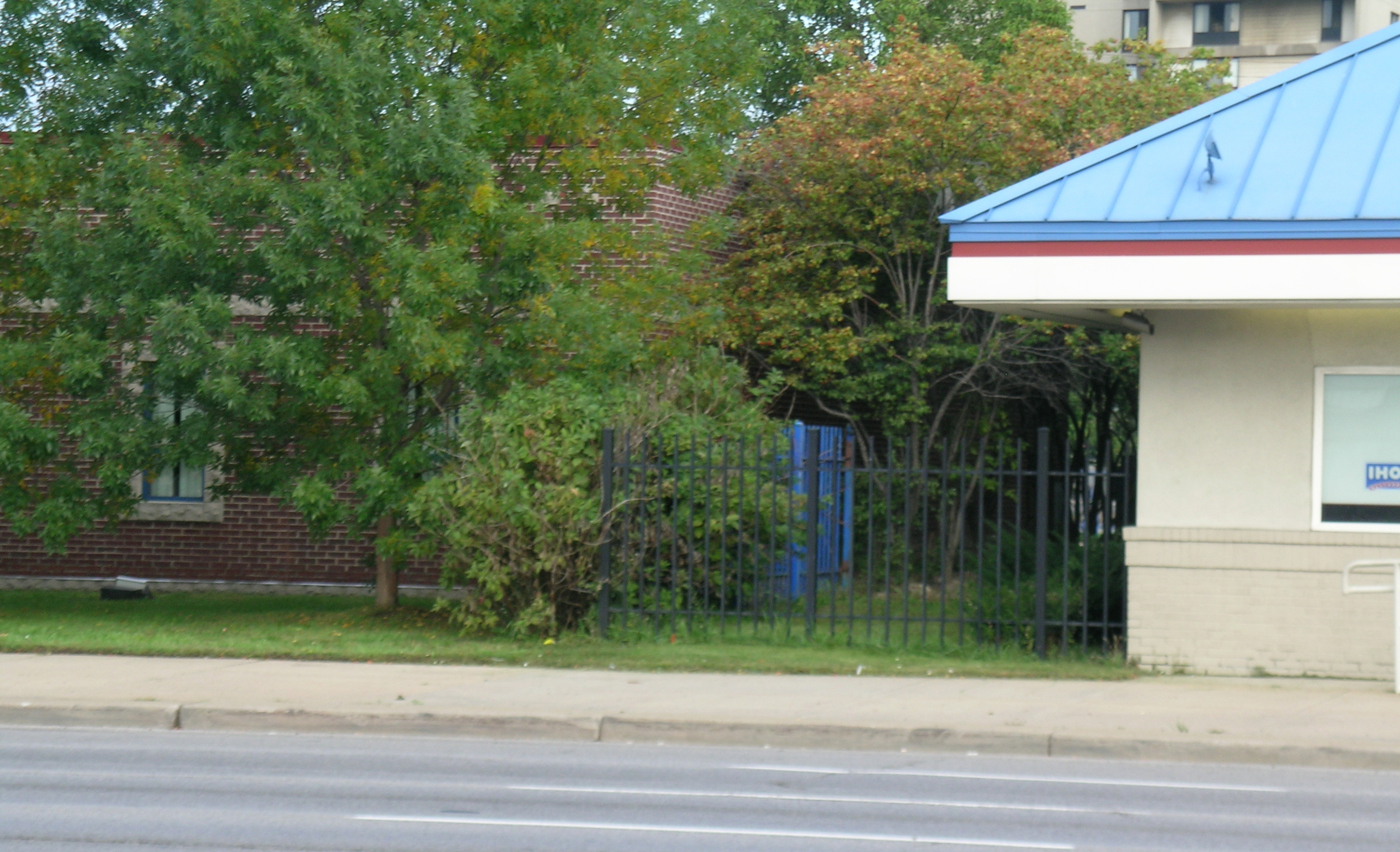
Site where the house once stood (now IHOP parking lot)
