= Hibbard Apartment Building =

- U.S. National Register of Historic Places
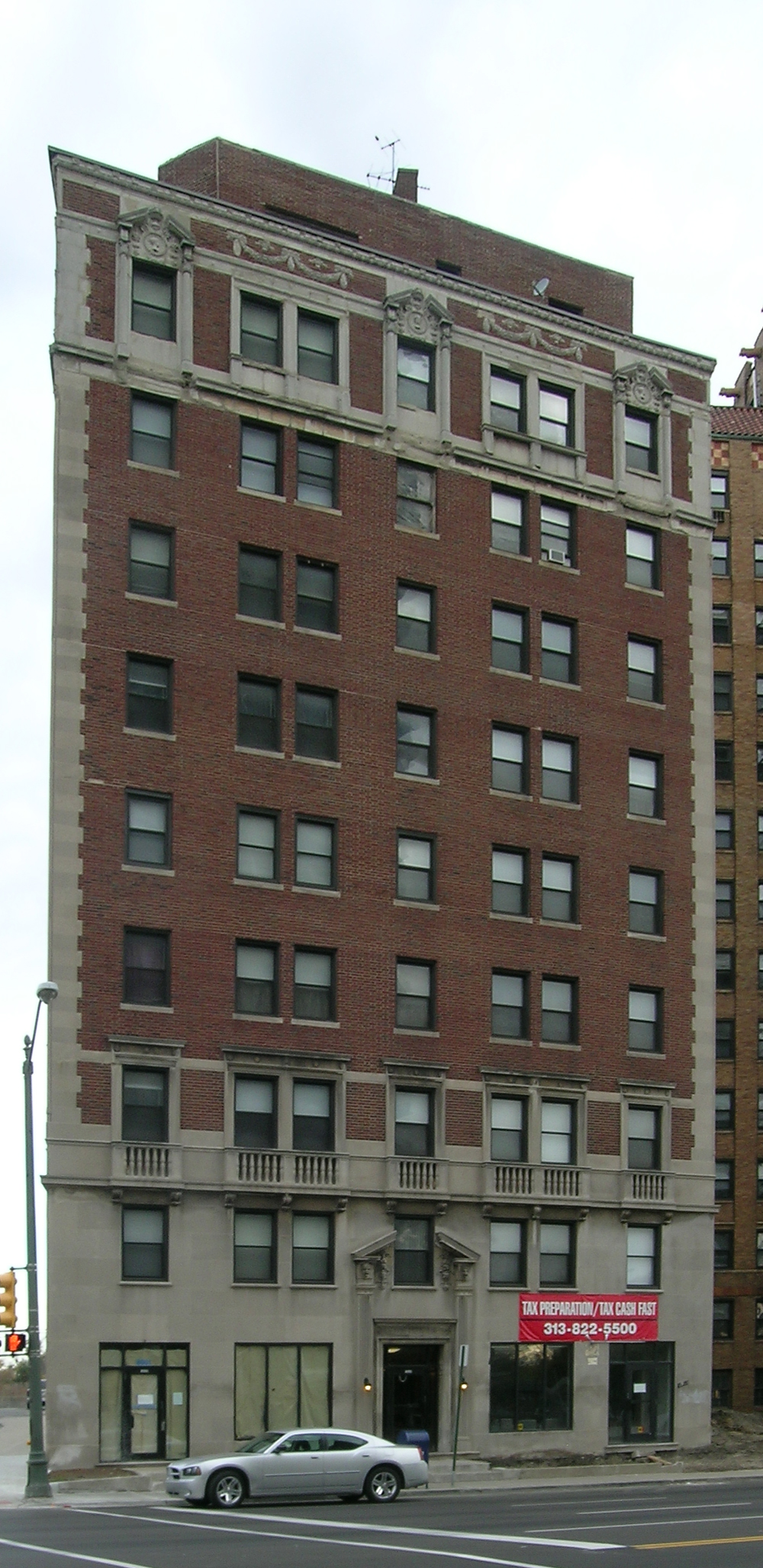
- Interactive map
- Location: 8905 East Jefferson Avenue; Detroit, Michigan
- Coordinates: 42°21′26″N 82°59′14″W
- Built: 1924
- Architect: Brown & Derrick
- Architectural style: Renaissance Revival
- MPS: East Jefferson Avenue Residential TR
- NRHP reference No.: 85002938
- Added to NRHP: October 09, 1985

The Hibbard Apartment Building is an apartment building located at 8905 East Jefferson Avenue in Detroit, Michigan, directly adjacent to The Kean. It was listed on the National Register of Historic Places in 1985.

== Description ==
The Hibbard Apartment Building is a nine-story structure with 40 units. The exterior is primarily red brick, with limestone on the first two stories. The façade is decorated with limestone decorative elements such as balustrades, pediments, and quoins. A pair of swags are located below the cornice.

== Significance ==
The building is notable for its handsome Renaissance Revival design. In addition, the Hibbard is notable for its architect, Robert O. Derrick, who also designed the National Historic Landmark Henry Ford Museum in Dearborn, Michigan.

The building is currently operated as an apartment building by Friedman Communities.
