= Somerset Apartments =

- U.S. National Register of Historic Places
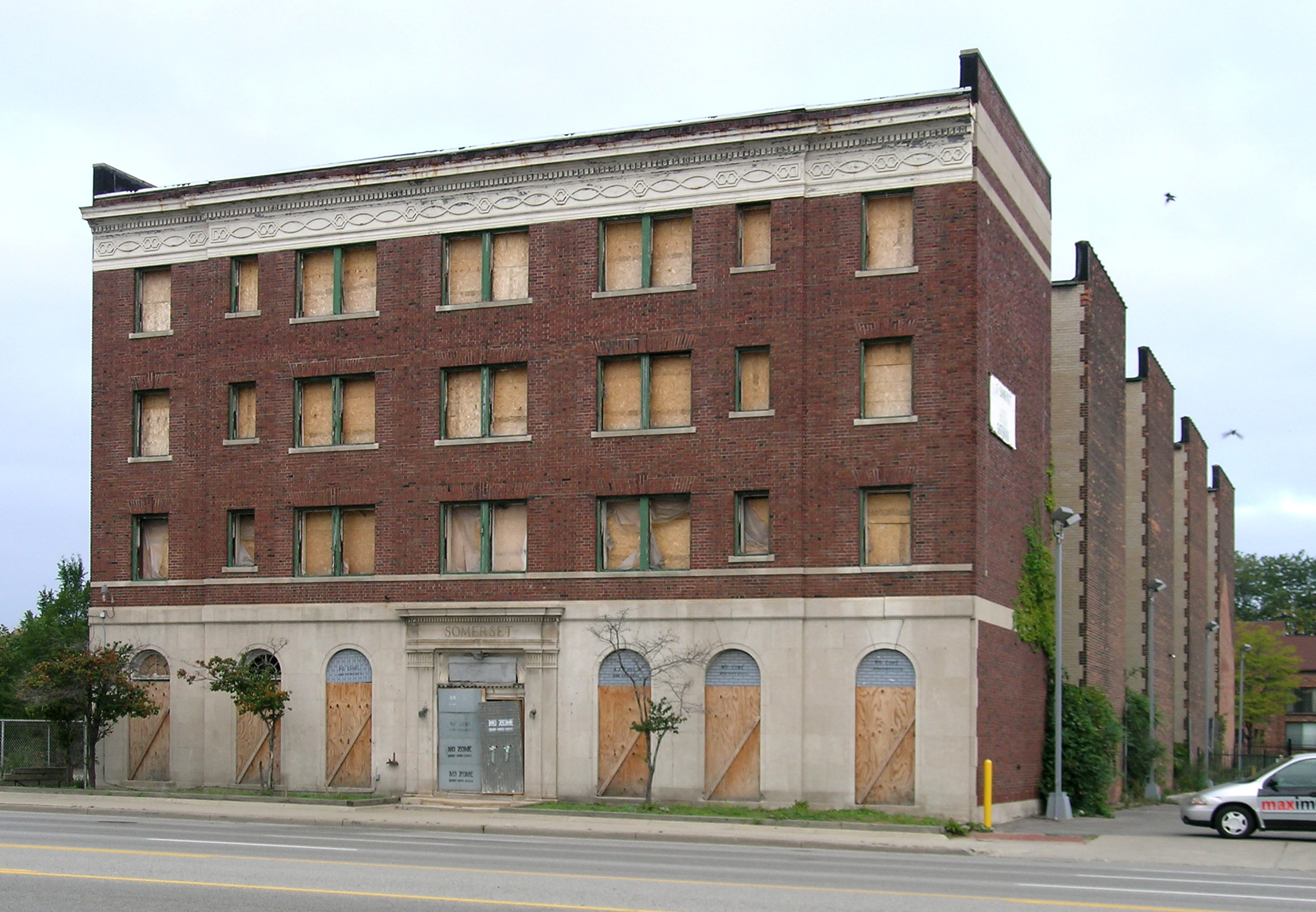
- Interactive map
- Location: 1523 East Jefferson Avenue; Detroit, Michigan
- Coordinates: 42°20′7″N 83°1′47″W
- Built: 1922
- Architect: C. Howard Crane
- Architectural style: Georgian, Federal
- Demolished: 2014
- MPS: East Jefferson Avenue Residential TR
- NRHP reference No.: 85002946
- Added to NRHP: October 9, 1985

The Somerset Apartments was an apartment building located in Detroit, Michigan. It was also known as the Parkcrest Apartment Building. The building was listed on the National Register of Historic Places in 1985.

== Description ==
The Somerset Apartments were five interconnected rectangular buildings, each four stories, built in a row running rearward from Jefferson. It had 80 units and was over 45,000 square feet (4,200 m^{2}). The front façade was symmetrical, faced with limestone on the first story and red brick above, with arched windows on the first floor. The roofline had a dentiled cornice with a white frieze below.

== History and significance ==
The apartment building was an excellent example of high-quality middle-class residential architecture from the 1920s. The May 14, 1922 issue of the Detroit Free Press lists C. Howard Crane as the architect of the building. In the 2000s, the building was unused, and was slated for demolition by the city of Detroit. The Somerset Apartments was in a two-alarm fire on November 23, 2013. It was damaged beyond repair and was demolished 7 months later.
