= Chateau Frontenac Apartments =

Building in Detroit, Michigan, U.S.

- Formerly listed on the U.S. National Register of Historic Places
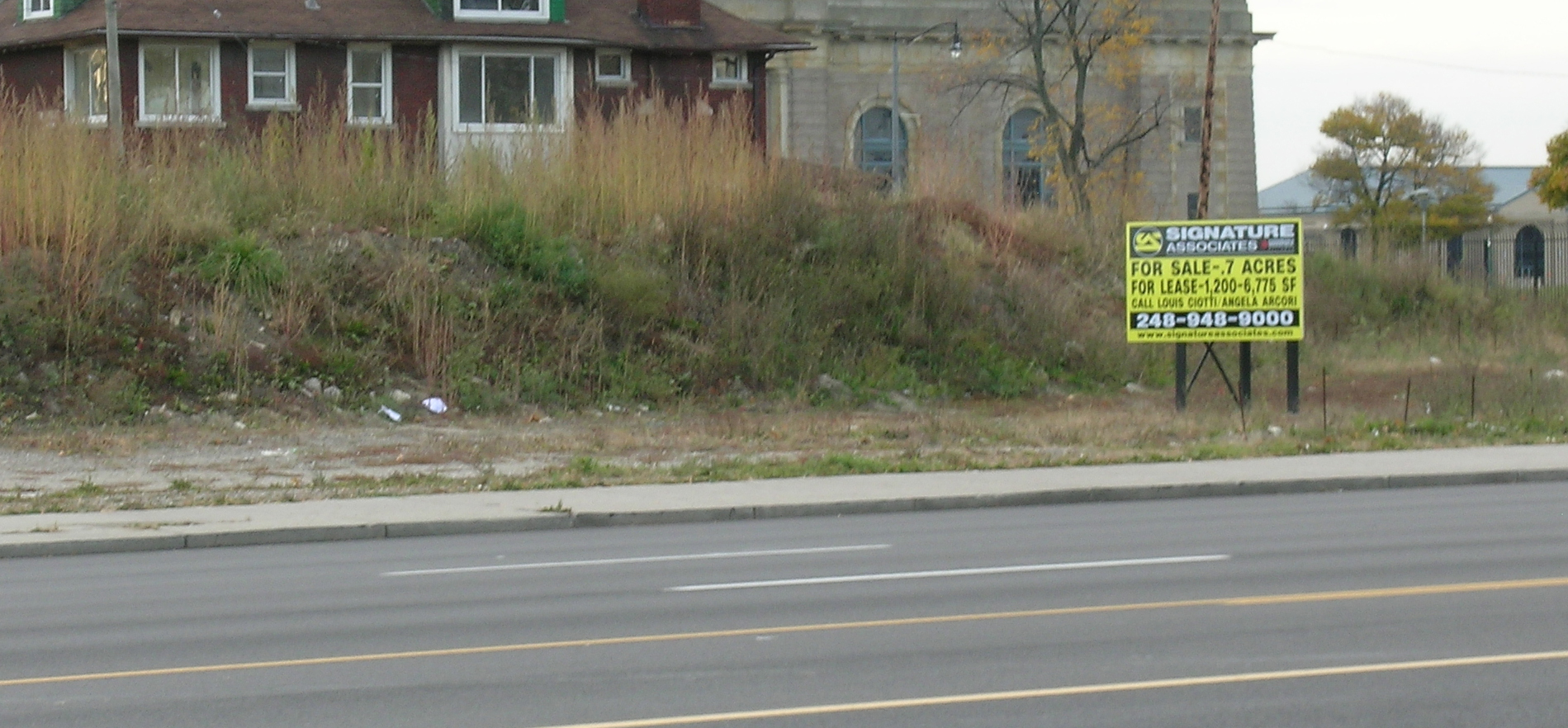
- Interactive map
- Location: 10410 East Jefferson Avenue; Detroit, Michigan
- Coordinates: 42°21′47″N 82°58′43″W
- Built: 1925
- Architect: J. Will Wilson, Otto Misch
- Architectural style: Late 19th And 20th Century Revivals
- Demolished: June 1999
- MPS: East Jefferson Avenue Residential TR
- NRHP reference No.: 91000213

Significant dates
- Added to NRHP: February 28, 1991
- Removed from NRHP: June 10, 2020

The Chateau Frontenac Apartments was an apartment building located in Detroit, Michigan. It bore the name of the famous Château Frontenac hotel in Quebec City, Canada. The building was listed on the National Register of Historic Places in 1991, but was subsequently demolished in 1999. It was removed from the National Register in 2020.

== Description ==
The Chateau Frontenac was an eight-story apartment building constructed from buff brick, with off-white terra cotta details and a hipped roof of green Spanish tile. The building was Mediterranean Revival with some French Gothic accents, and covered an E-shaped plan area. The entranceway was through a tile-roofed projecting pavilion (the center leg of the "E") containing a terra cotta fountain with a dolphin motif. The first floor had raised bricks every ninth course or so, giving the appearance of rustication.

Different bonds of brick (including American bond and English bond) were used throughout to add textural interest. Fanlike terra cotta motifs were inserted above second floor windows. Cartouches of terra cotta were placed between the top-floor windows, and decorative terra cotta eave brackets were beneath the roof. Three-sided multi-paned bay windows projected into the courtyard.

The interior of the building originally held 102 apartments. Decorative elements included wood frame moldings and hallway cornices with leaf motifs.

== History ==
The Chateau Frontenac Apartments was originally designed and owned by architect J. Will Wilson. The Chateau Frontenac was one of several high quality apartment buildings that opened along East Jefferson Avenue in the first few decades of the twentieth century. However, Wilson apparently had financial troubles during the construction of the building, and he was forced to sell the building in 1927. The building had a succession of owners from that time until its eventual demolition in 1999.
