= Jefferson Hall (Detroit) =

- Formerly listed on the U.S. National Register of Historic Places
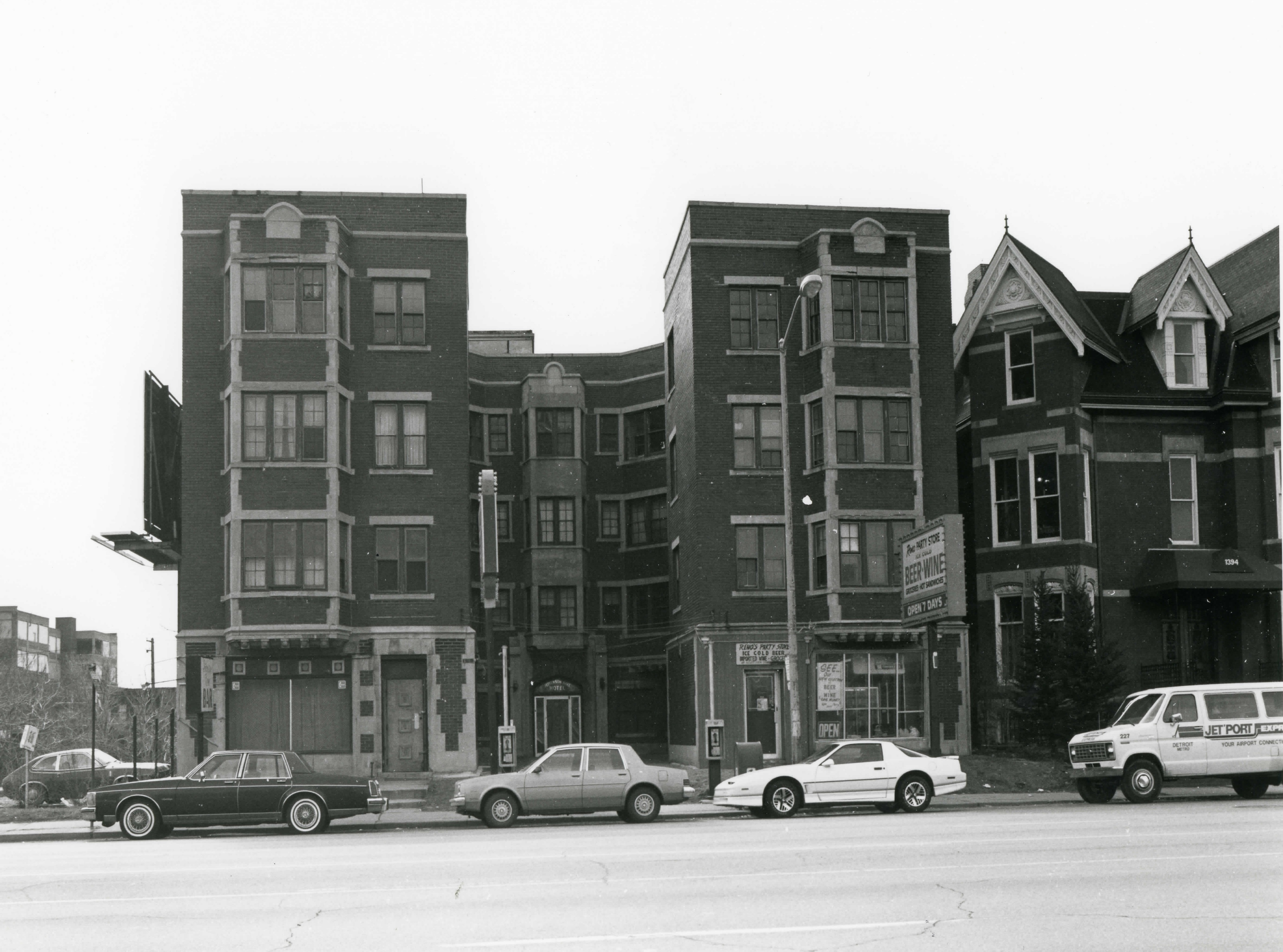
- Jefferson Hall, 1985
- Interactive map
- Location: 1404 East Jefferson Avenue, Detroit, Michigan
- Coordinates: 42°20′6″N 83°1′50″W
- Built: 1916
- Architectural style: Late 19th And 20th Century Revivals
- Demolished: c. 1990
- MPS: East Jefferson Avenue Residential TR
- NRHP reference No.: 85002939

Significant dates
- Added to NRHP: October 9, 1985
- Removed from NRHP: December 2, 2024

Jefferson Hall was an apartment building located in Detroit, Michigan. It was listed on the National Register of Historic Places in 1985, but subsequently demolished. The building was removed from the National Register of Historic Places in 2024.

== History ==
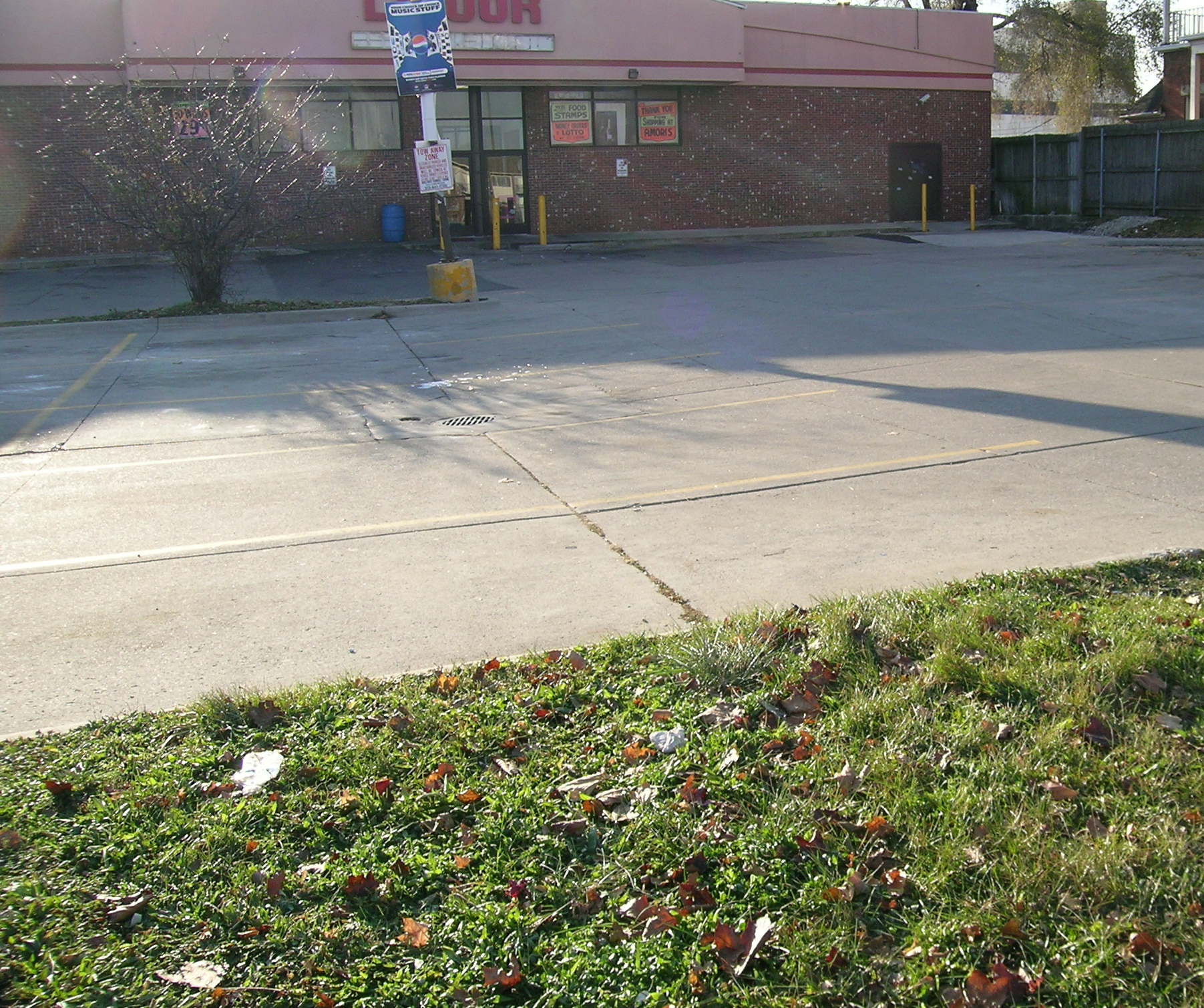
Parking lot where Jefferson Hall once stood

Jefferson Hall was constructed in 1916. It operated as an apartment through the 1980s but was demolished in about 1990.

== Description ==
Jefferson Hall was a four-story red brick apartment building built in the "garden court" style, where apartments are arranged in a U-shape around a central courtyard. This arrangement gave tenants more window space and a courtyard view. The building was trimmed with stone. The main lobby was located in the center of the U, and two commercial stores flanked the entryway. Projecting bay windows were located above on the second through fourth floors.
