= Ponchartrain Apartments =

- U.S. National Register of Historic Places
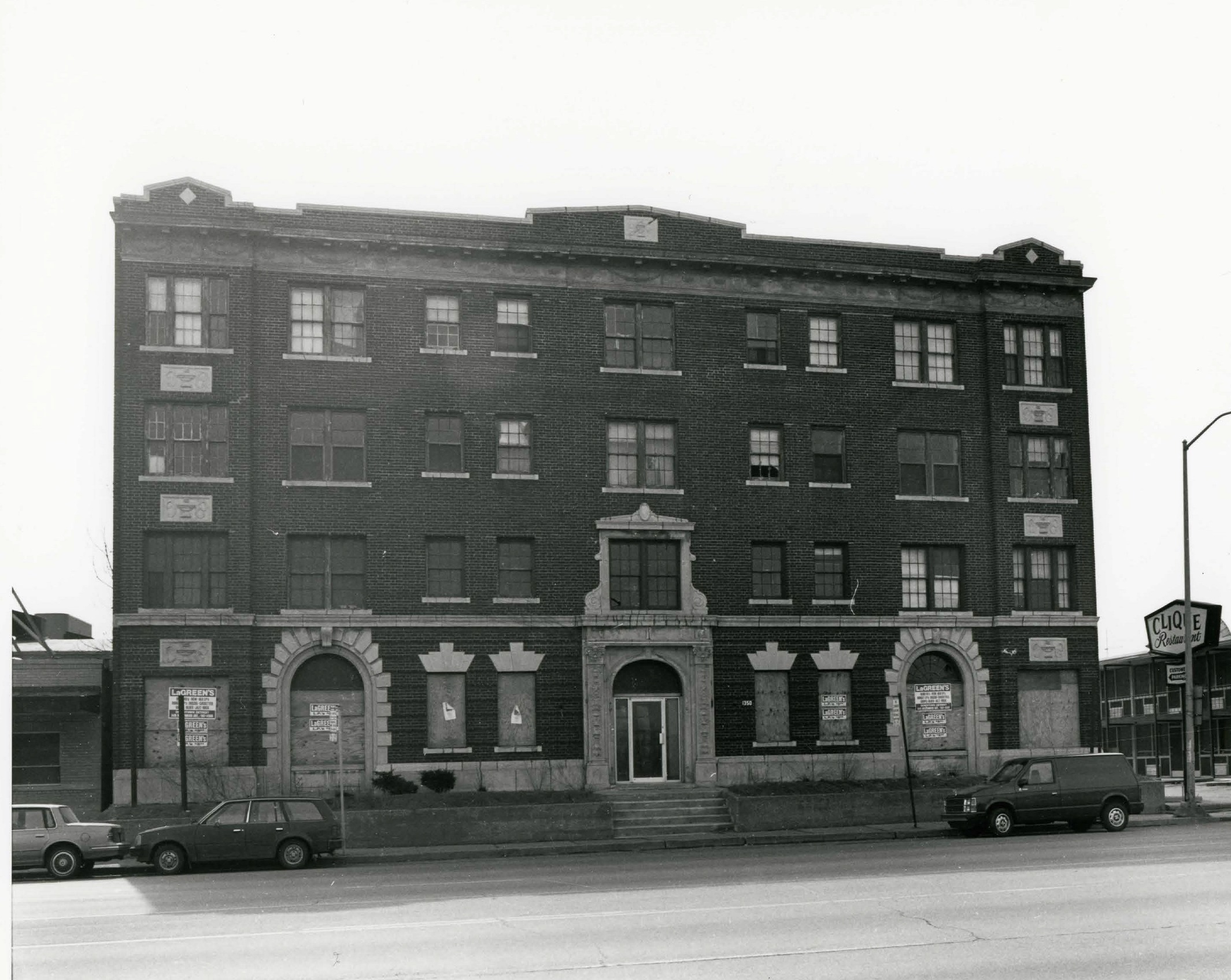
- Ponchartrain Apartments, 1985
- Interactive map
- Location: 1350 E. Jefferson, Detroit, Michigan
- Coordinates: 42°20′2″N 83°1′55″W
- Built: 1920
- Architectural style: Classical Revival
- Demolished: c. 1990
- MPS: East Jefferson Avenue Residential TR
- NRHP reference No.: 85002945
- Added to NRHP: October 9, 1985

The Ponchartrain Apartments was an apartment building located at 1350 East Jefferson Avenue in Detroit, Michigan. It was also known as the Renaissance Apartments. It was listed on the National Register of Historic Places in 1985, but subsequently demolished.

== Description ==
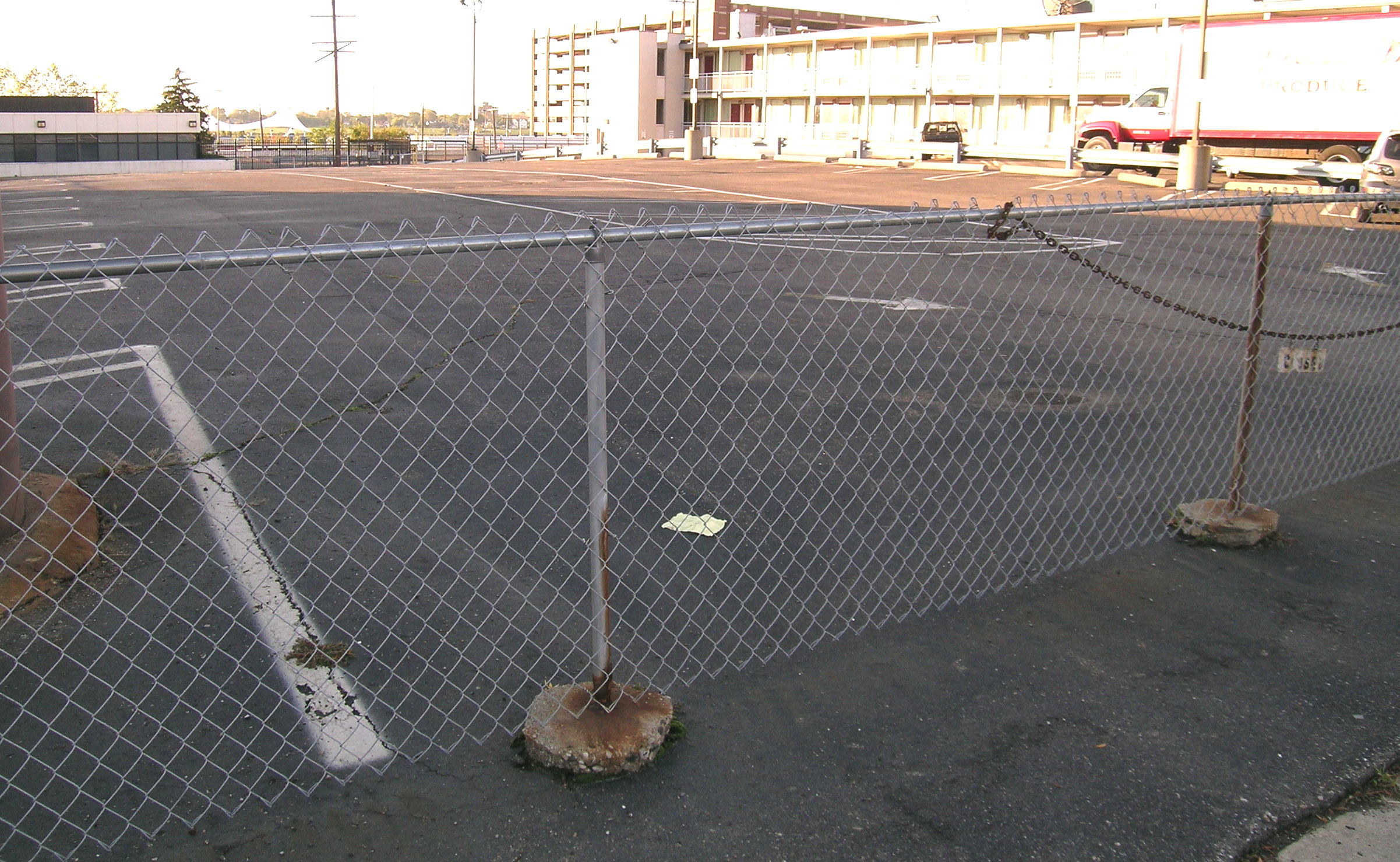
Parking lot where the Ponchartrain Apartments once stood

The Ponchartrain Apartment building was a four-story red brick structure sitting atop a limestone foundation. Window sills, coping, and a belt course between the first and second stories were also constructed of limestone. The entrance sat in an arched opening flanked by ornamental pilasters supporting the lintel. Swags and urns decorate the entablature, and urns also graced the stone relief panels beneath the end windows. The building contained 74 apartments.

== History ==
The Ponchartrain Apartments were built in 1920 at a cost of $195,000. The building went through a succession of owners, and was renamed the Monticello Apartment Hotel in 1926, the Shorecrest Apartments in 1949, and the Renaissance Apartments in 1981. The building has since been demolished.
