= Moross House =

Historic house in Michigan, United States

- U.S. National Register of Historic Places
- Michigan State Historic Site
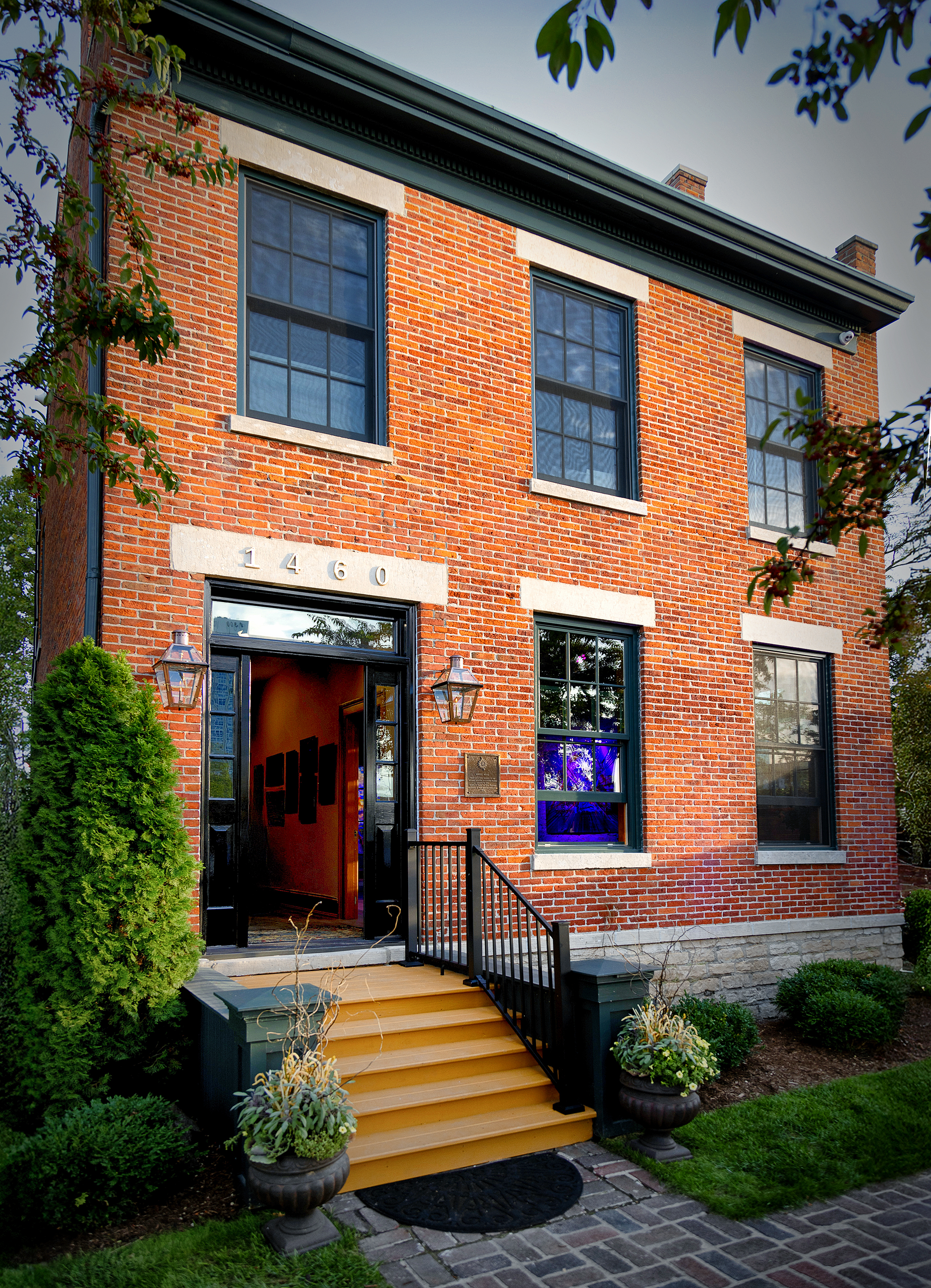
- Moross House 2024
- Interactive map
- Location: 1460 East Jefferson Avenue; Detroit, Michigan
- Coordinates: 42°20′3″N 83°1′52″W
- Built: 1855
- Architect: Christopher Moross
- Architectural style: Federal
- NRHP reference No.: 72000669

Significant dates
- Added to NRHP: January 13, 1972
- Designated MSHS: June 19, 1971

The Moross House is a house located at 1460 East Jefferson Avenue in Detroit, Michigan. It is one of the oldest surviving brick homes in the city; it was designated a Michigan State Historic Site in 1971 and listed on the National Register of Historic Places in 1972.

== History ==
The Moross House was built in 1840 by French brickmaker Christopher Moross; it was one of two homes built by him on the site. The Moross House is the oldest brick dwelling remaining in the city of Detroit. Ownership of the property changed hands several times, and included shipbuilding James N. Jones, under whose name the house listed on the Historic American Buildings Survey, and Colonel Freeman Norvell, son of US Senator John Norvell of Michigan. The Colonel fought at the Battle of Gettysburg in 1863, was a University of Michigan Regent, State Senator and co-owner of the Detroit Free Press.

The Detroit Historical Commission purchased the property in the 1960s and completely restored the home from 1971 - 1973. The home was placed on the National Historic Register in 1972. The city of Detroit operated the home as the Moross House Museum and the Detroit Garden Center used the house and gardens for events, meetings, parties and sensational plantings. According to the University Michigan, the gardens contain the oldest, or second oldest, wisteria in the Midwest. In 2005 the city of Detroit sold the home and property to Mr. and Mr. Roland Scott.

In April 2016, the Moross House and property was sold to LTD Limited, LLC, a Michigan Limited Liability Company owned by Linda K. Schinkel Rodney and her two sons Theodore M. Shinkle and N. Douglas Shinkle and Theodore individually. The home and property are currently the studio, showroom and gallery for Schinkel Fine Art, LLC, a fine art business representing the artworks of Mother/Son Artist Duo Linda Schinkel Rodney and Theodore M. Schinkel. The Schinkels renovated the house, finishing in 2025.

== Description ==
The Moross House is a three-bay townhouse, built in a vernacular Federal style with Greek Revival details, including heavy stone lintels and sidelights and a transom surrounding the entrance. It stands two stories tall, built on a foundation of river limestone. The roof is parapeted with wood shingles, and a pair of chimneys bracket the roof. A single-story addition sits to the rear, and a second is on the side.

== Images ==
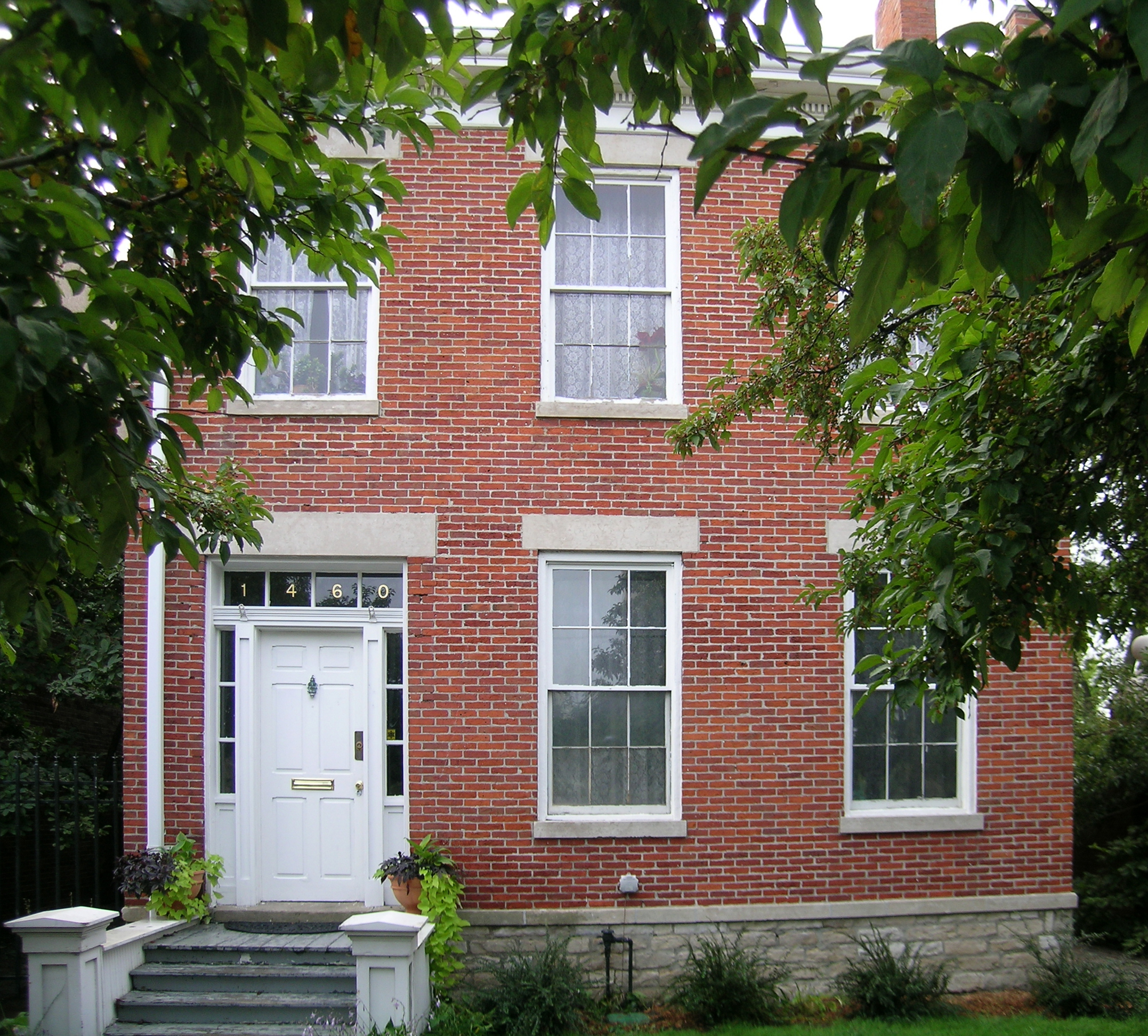
Moross House, 2008

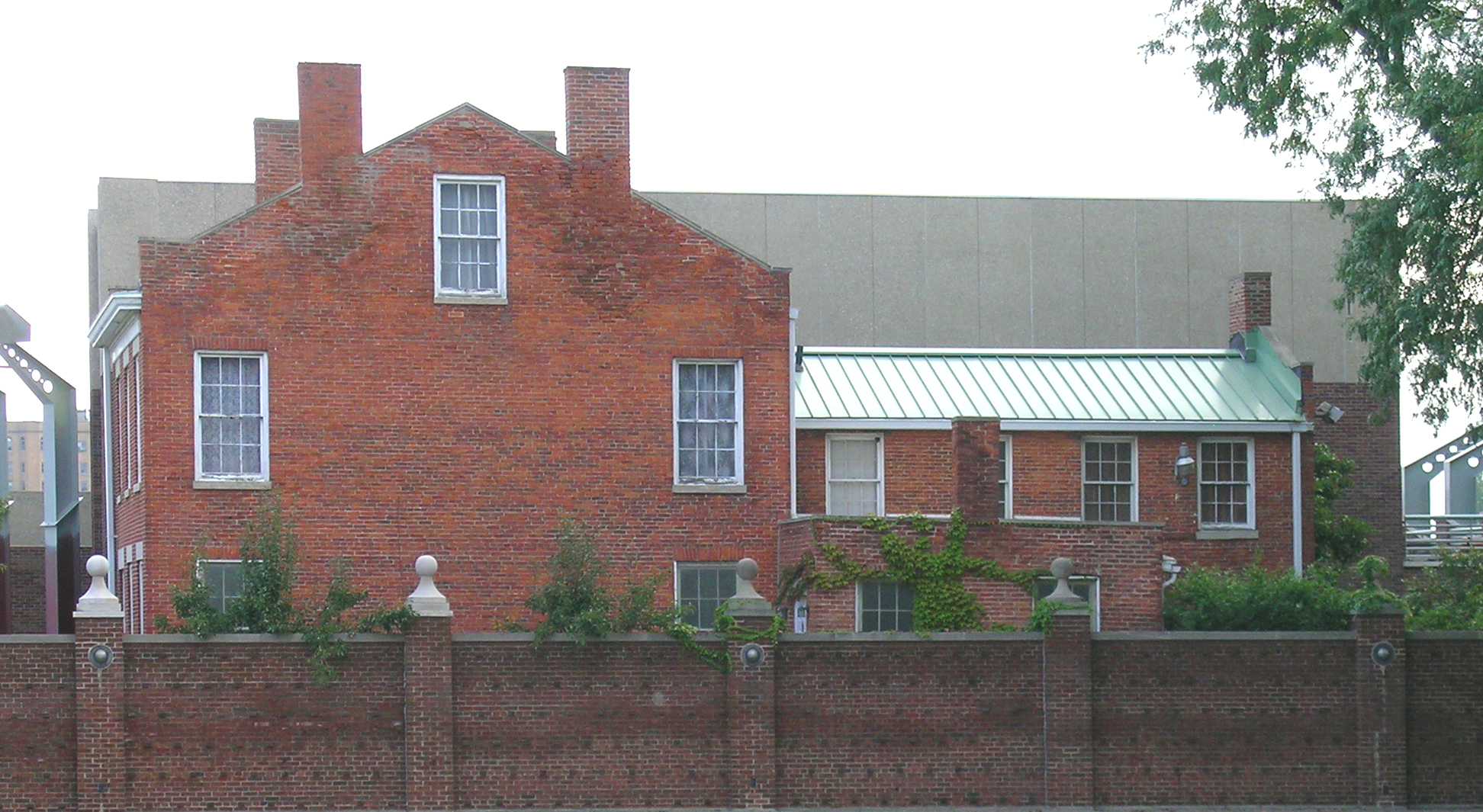
Side profile before new windows

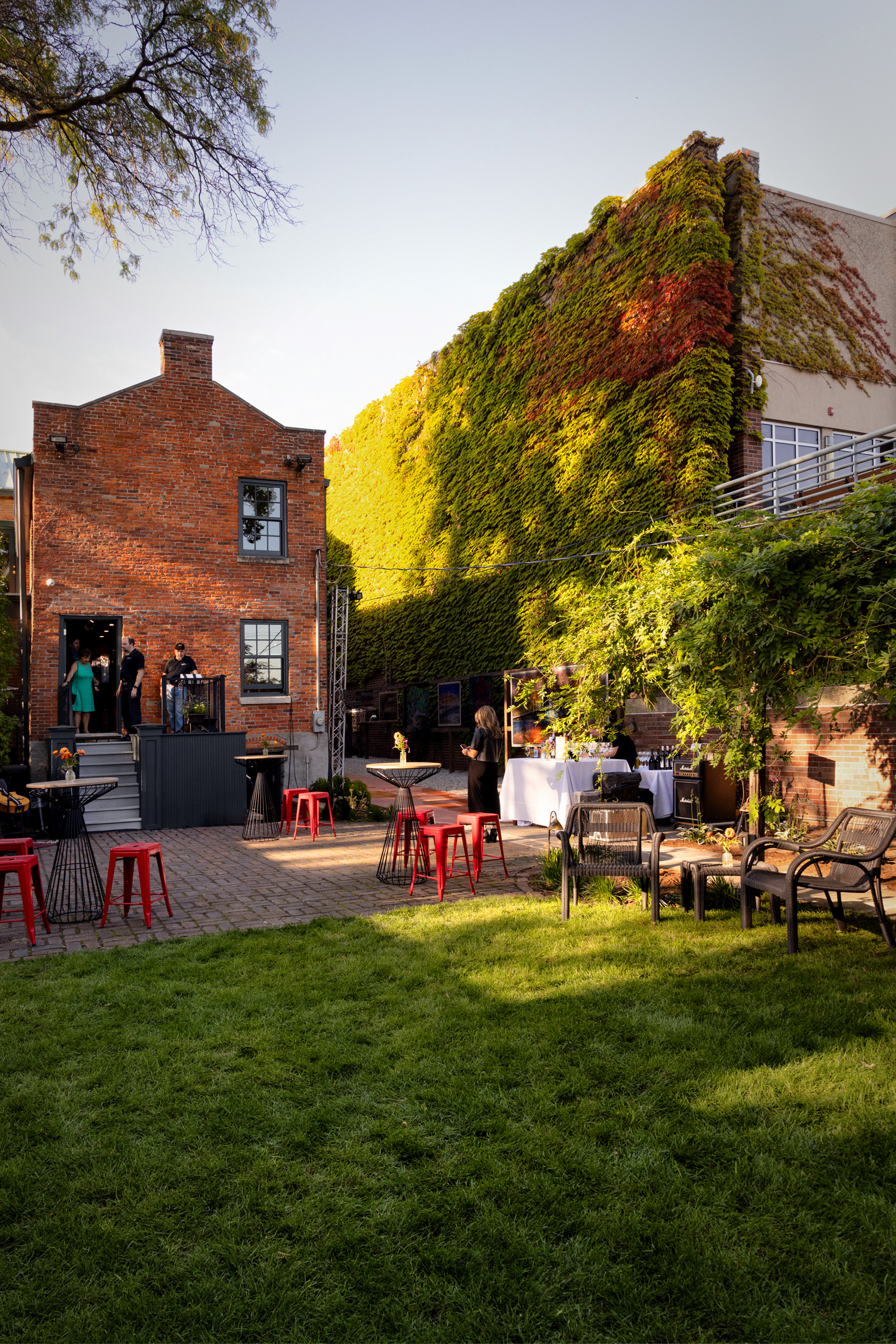
The back yard of the Moross House showing the Detroit Secret Garden. 2024
