= William H. Wells House =

Historic house in Michigan, United States

- U.S. National Register of Historic Places
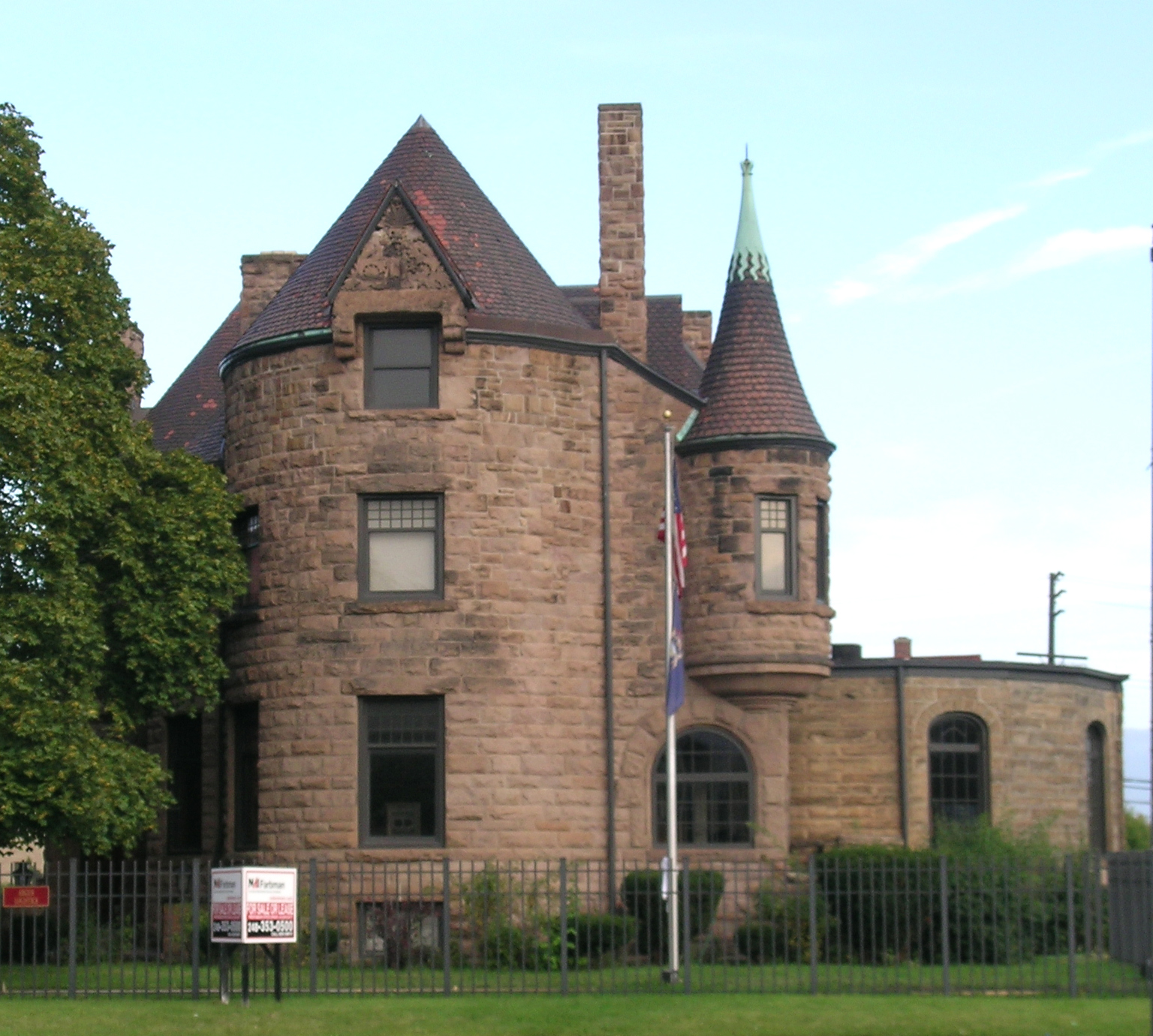

- Location within Michigan Location within the United States
- Interactive map
- Location: 2931 E. Jefferson Ave. Detroit, Michigan
- Coordinates: 42°20′28″N 83°1′0″W
- Area: less than one acre
- Built: 1889
- Architect: William Henry Miller
- Architectural style: Romanesque Revival, Richardsonian Romanesque
- MPS: East Jefferson Avenue Residential TR
- NRHP reference No.: 85002949
- Added to NRHP: October 9, 1985

The William H. Wells House is a private residence located at 2931 East Jefferson Avenue in Detroit, Michigan. It was listed on the National Register of Historic Places in 1985.

== History ==
This house was designed by Cornell architect William Henry Miller and constructed in 1889 by the Vinton company. At the time, the property was owned by the heirs of William Croul. William H. Wells, a partner in the law firm a partner in the law firm of Wells, Angell, Boynton and McMillan, moved into the house soon after it was constructed, and purchased it in 1900. After Wells' death, his widow sold the house to Ella Barbour, who owned the house until 1949. The University of Detroit Alumni Association purchased the house in 1966 and donated it to the University of Detroit. The house went through a succession of owners, and was refurbished in 2000. Banyan Investments LLC purchased the house in 2015.

== Architecture ==
The William H. Wells House is a two-and-one-half-story, 18,000 square feet Romanesque Revival mansion, built of coursed, rock-face stone. The house is built on an irregular plan with an asymmetrical, picturesque composition. The entrance is within a projection, and a turret with a concave conical roof at one corner sits at one corner of the house. Other bays project randomly from the main structure. A 4500 square foot 1 1/2-story carriage house in red brick and clapboard was built at the rear of the house in 1891.

The house is significant as an outstanding example of Romanesque residential architecture in Detroit and for its association with architect William Henry Miller.

== See also ==
- National Register of Historic Places listings in Detroit, Michigan
