= Thomas A. Parker House =

Historic house in Michigan, United States

- U.S. National Register of Historic Places
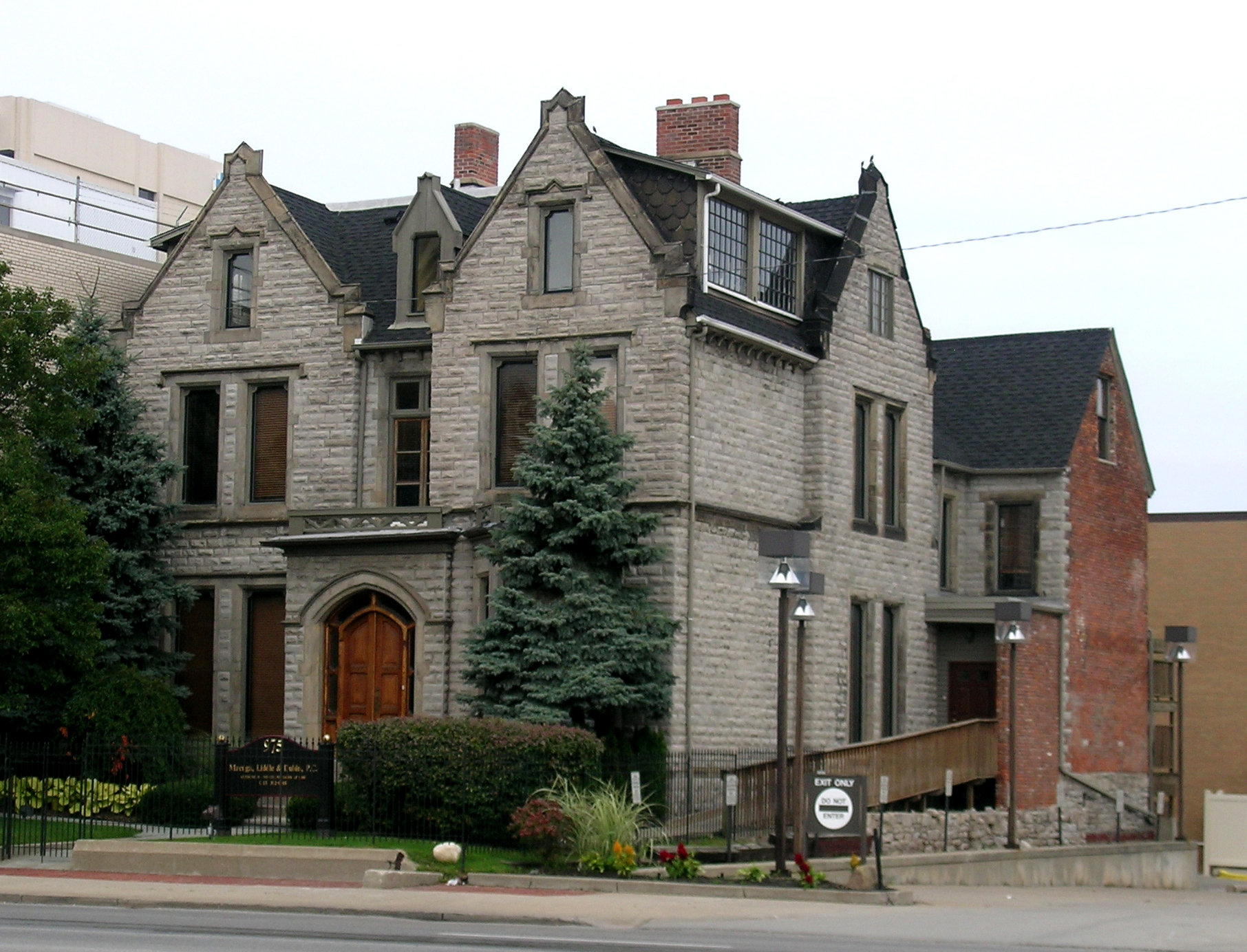
- Interactive map
- Location: 975 East Jefferson Avenue; Detroit, Michigan
- Coordinates: 42.333357°N 83.035159°W
- Built: 1868
- Architect: Gordon W. Lloyd
- Architectural style: Gothic Revival
- NRHP reference No.: 82000552
- Added to NRHP: November 12, 1982

The Thomas A. Parker House was built as a private residence and is located at 975 East Jefferson Avenue in Detroit, Michigan. The house was listed on the National Register of Historic Places in 1982. It is currently the law offices of Liddle Sheets Coulson P.C.

== Thomas Parker ==
Thomas Augustus Parker was born in New York and came to Detroit with his brother in 1845. The two established a successful wholesale grocery business, enabling Parker to grow wealthy. After his retirement, he invested most of his grocery profits in real estate, and was said to be worth $750,000 in 1895.

== History ==
Parker bought the land on which this house sits in 1867 and, in 1868, commissioned architect Gordon W. Lloyd to build what is now a rare example of a Gothic Revival house in Detroit. Parker lived in the house until his death in 1901. In the 1920s, the house was leased to the Advertisers Bureau by Parker's daughter, and in 1928 it was sold. The building was later used as an artist studio, offices and an apartment building. In 1957 it was sold again, and used as offices, a reading room, a hospital record room and four apartments. It was later turned into the law offices of Liddle Sheets Coulson P.C.

== Description ==
The house is built from Kelly Island grey limestone, with sandstone from Amherst used as trim. The front façade is asymmetric, with three bays. The central bay holds an arched double-door entranceway on the first floor, and above, double French doors leading to a balcony. The side bays have transverse gables, with the east bay containing a first-floor bay window.
