= List of Art Deco architecture in Michigan =

This is a list of buildings that are examples of the Art Deco architectural style in Michigan, United States.

== Ann Arbor ==
- Burton Memorial Tower, University Of Michigan Central Campus Historic District, Ann Arbor, 1936
- First National Bank Building, Ann Arbor, 1927
- Nickels Arcade, Ann Arbor, 1915
- State Theatre, Ann Arbor, 1942

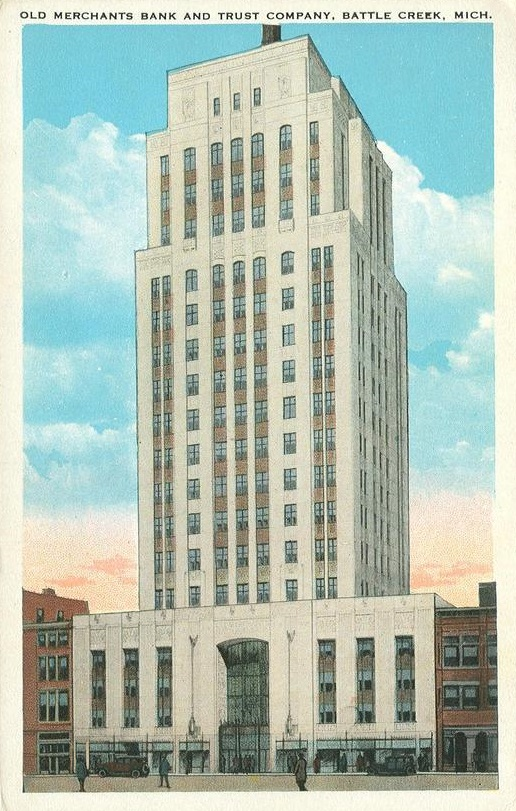
Heritage Tower, Battle Creek

== Battle Creek ==
- Battle Creek Tower, Battle Creek, 1931
- Boy's Club Building, Battle Creek, 1928
- Heritage Tower, Battle Creek, 1931

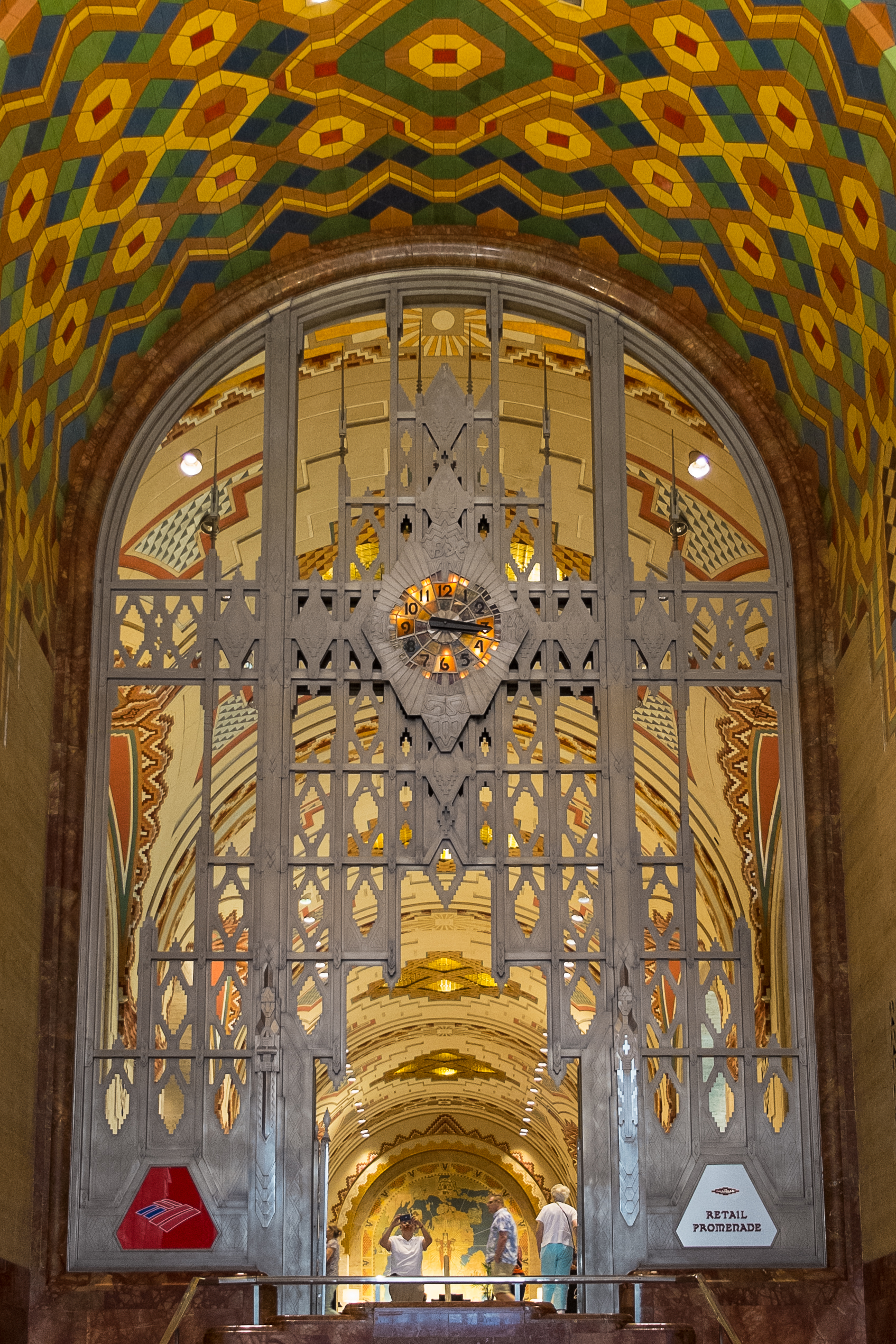
Guardian Building, Detroit

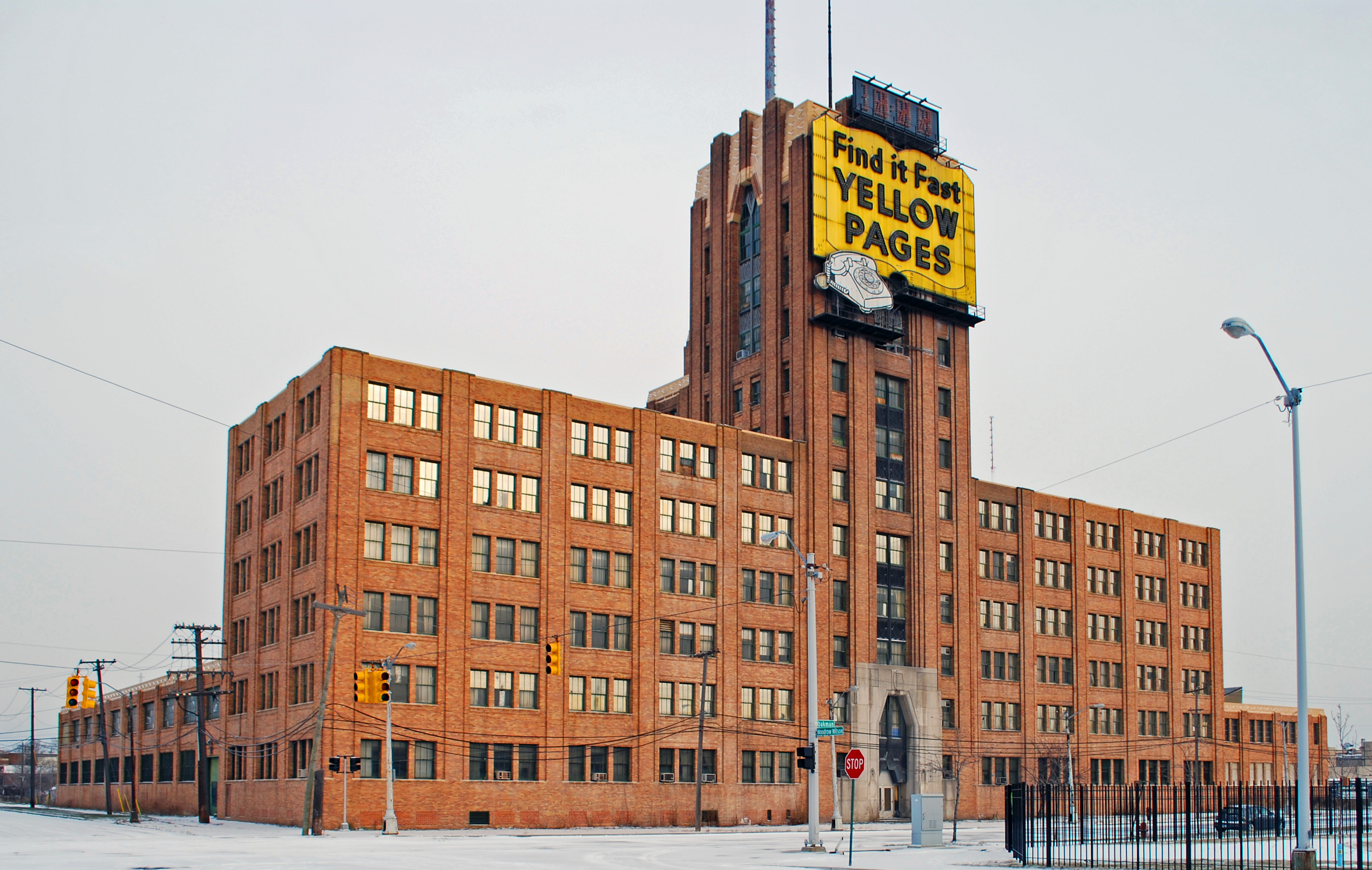
NSO Bell Building, Detroit

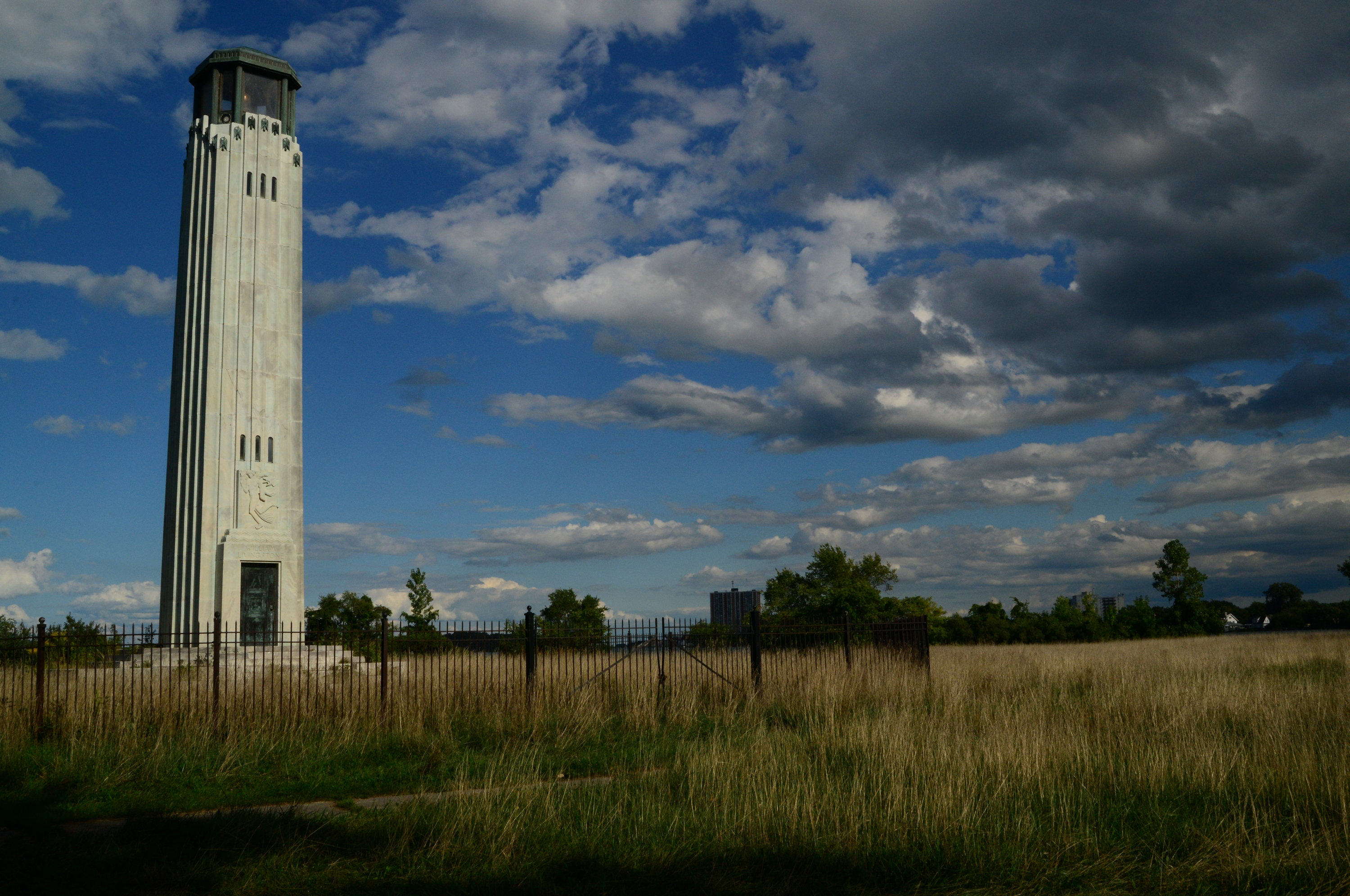
William Livingstone Memorial Lighthouse, Belle Isle Park, Detroit

== Detroit ==
- Argonaut Building (now A. Alfred Taubman Center for Design Education), Detroit, 1928
- Albert Kahn Building, Detroit, 1931
- Alger Theater, Detroit, 1935
- Ambassador Bridge, Detroit to Windsor, Ontario, Canada, 1929
- AT&T Michigan Headquarters, Detroit, 1928
- Boyce Apartments, Palmer Park Square Apartment Building Historic District, Detroit, 1925 and 1964
- Buhl Building, Detroit, 1925
- Cass Motor Sales, Detroit, 1928
- Crystal Ballroom, Detroit, 1919 and 1936
- David Stott Building, Detroit, 1929
- Denby High School, Detroit, 1930
- Detroit Free Press Building, Detroit, 1925
- Detroit Naval Armory, Detroit, 1930
- Detroit News Complex, Detroit, 1915
- El Tovar Apartments, Detroit, 1928
- Elwood Bar, Detroit, 1936
- Fisher Building, Detroit, 1928
- Fox Theatre, Detroit, 1928
- The Frontera Building, Detroit, 1932
- Guardian Building, Detroit, 1929
- Industrial Building, Detroit, 1928
- The Kean, Detroit, 1931
- Laredo Apartments, Detroit, 1920s
- Lee Plaza, Detroit, 1929
- Maccabees Building, Detroit, 1927
- Majestic Theater, Detroit, 1915 and 1934
- Metropolitan Center for High Technology, Detroit, 1927
- Michigan Bell and Western Electric Warehouse, Detroit, 1929
- Mumford High School, Detroit, 1949
- Music Hall Center for the Performing Arts, Detroit, 1928
- Penobscot Building, Detroit, 1928
- Pershing High School, Detroit, 1929
- Saint Paul Manor Apartments, Detroit, 1925
- Stanley's Mania Café, Detroit, 1940
- Stratford Theatre, Detroit, 1916 and 1930s
- Theodore Levin United States Courthouse, Detroit, 1934
- Town Apartments, Detroit, 1929
- Vanity Ballroom Building, Detroit, 1929
- Whitmore Plaza, Palmer Park Square Apartment Building Historic District, Detroit, 1925 and 1964
- William Livingstone Memorial Lighthouse, Belle Isle Park., Detroit, 1929
- WWJ (AM) Transmitter Building, Detroit, 1936

== Flint ==
- Charles Stewart Mott Foundation Building, Flint, 1928
- The Paterson Building, Flint, 1931

== Kalamazoo ==
- Kalamazoo Federal Building and U.S. Courthouse, Kalamazoo, 1939

== Lake Huron ==
- DeTour Reef Light, Lake Huron, 1931
- Martin Reef Light Station, Lake Huron, 1927
- Round Island Passage Light, Lake Huron, 1948

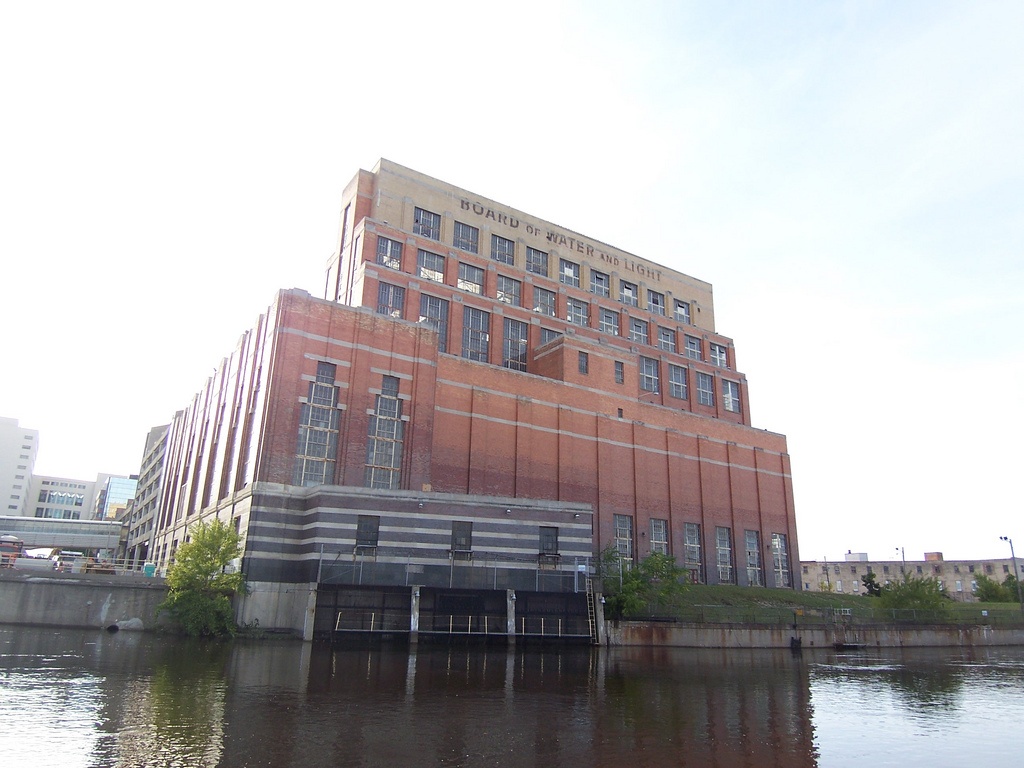
Ottawa Street Power Station, Lansing

== Lansing ==
- Boji Tower, Lansing, 1931
- Charles E. Chamberlain Federal Building & Post Office, Lansing, 1932
- J. W. Sexton High School, Lansing, 1943
- J. W. Knapp Company Building, Lansing, 1929
- Ottawa Street Power Station, Lansing, 1939
- Strand Theatre and Arcade, Lansing, 1920

== Saginaw ==
- Michigan Bell Building, Saginaw, 1930

== Traverse City ==
- Bijou by the Bay, Traverse City, 1930s
- State Theatre, Traverse City, 1923

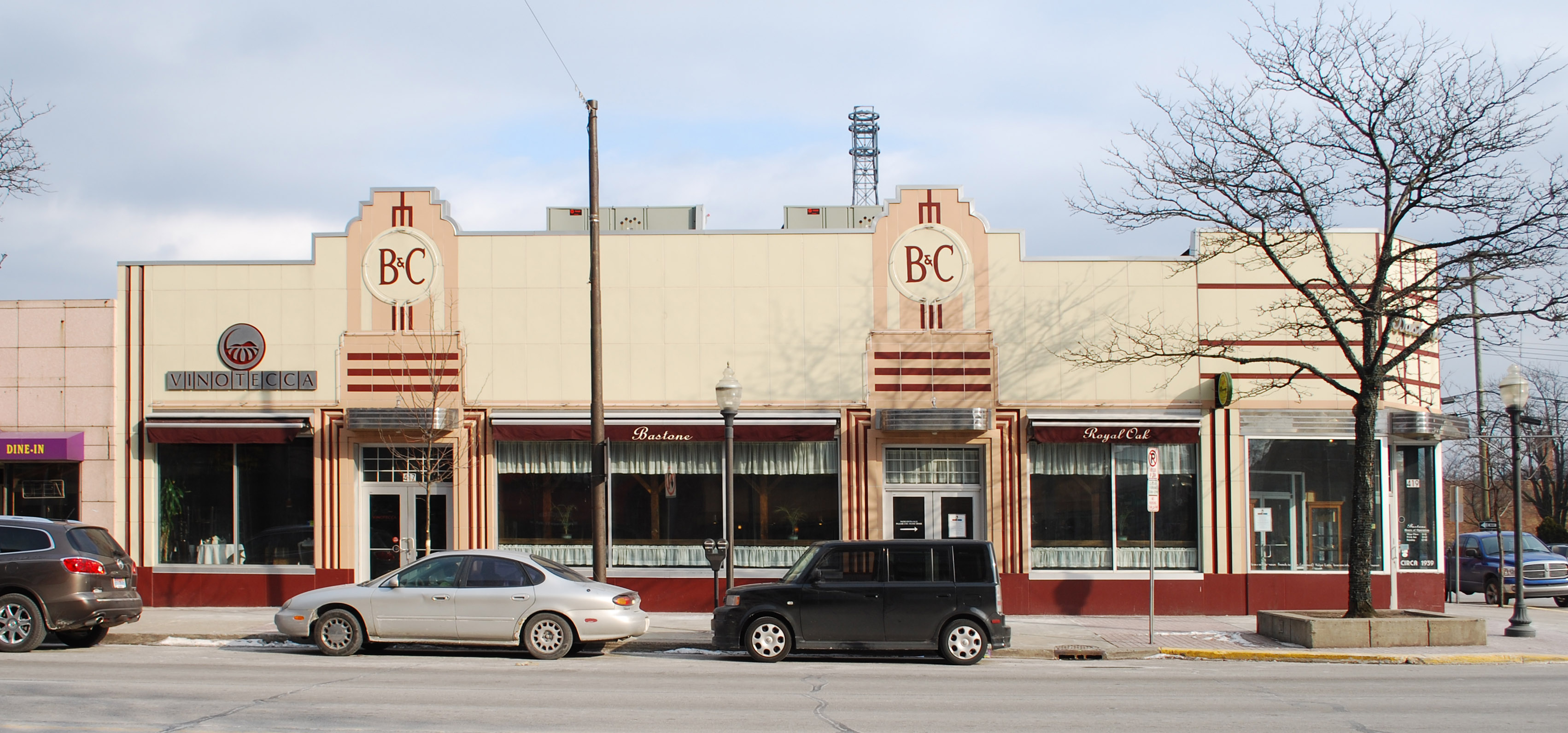
B and C Grocery Building, Royal Oak

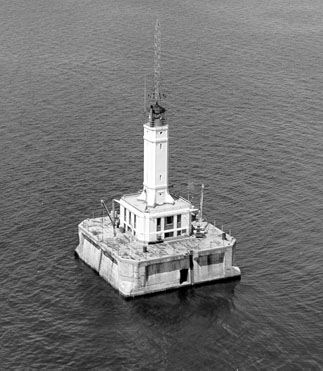
Grays Reef Light, Lake Michigan

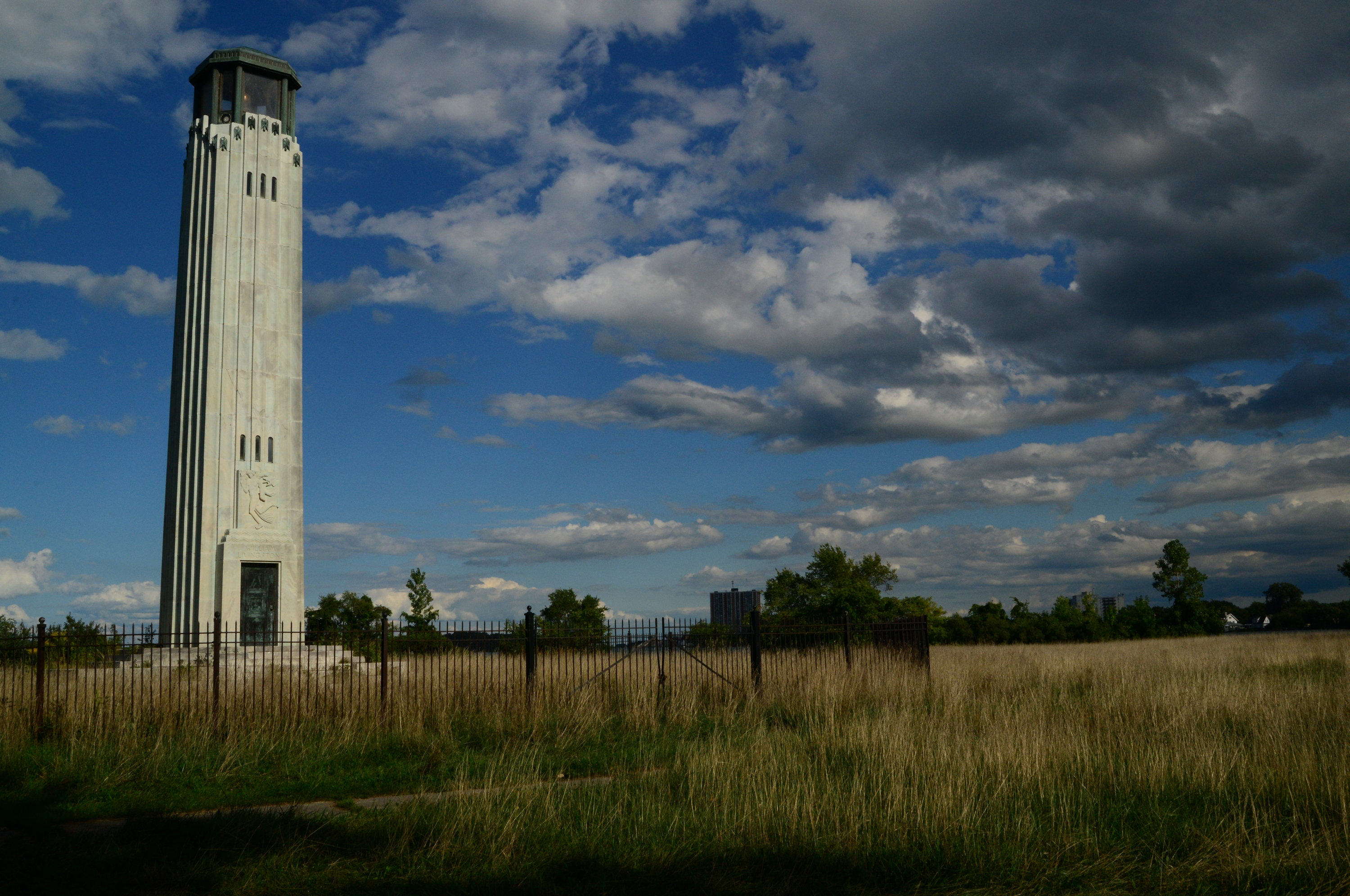
William Livingstone Lighthouse, Belle Isle Park

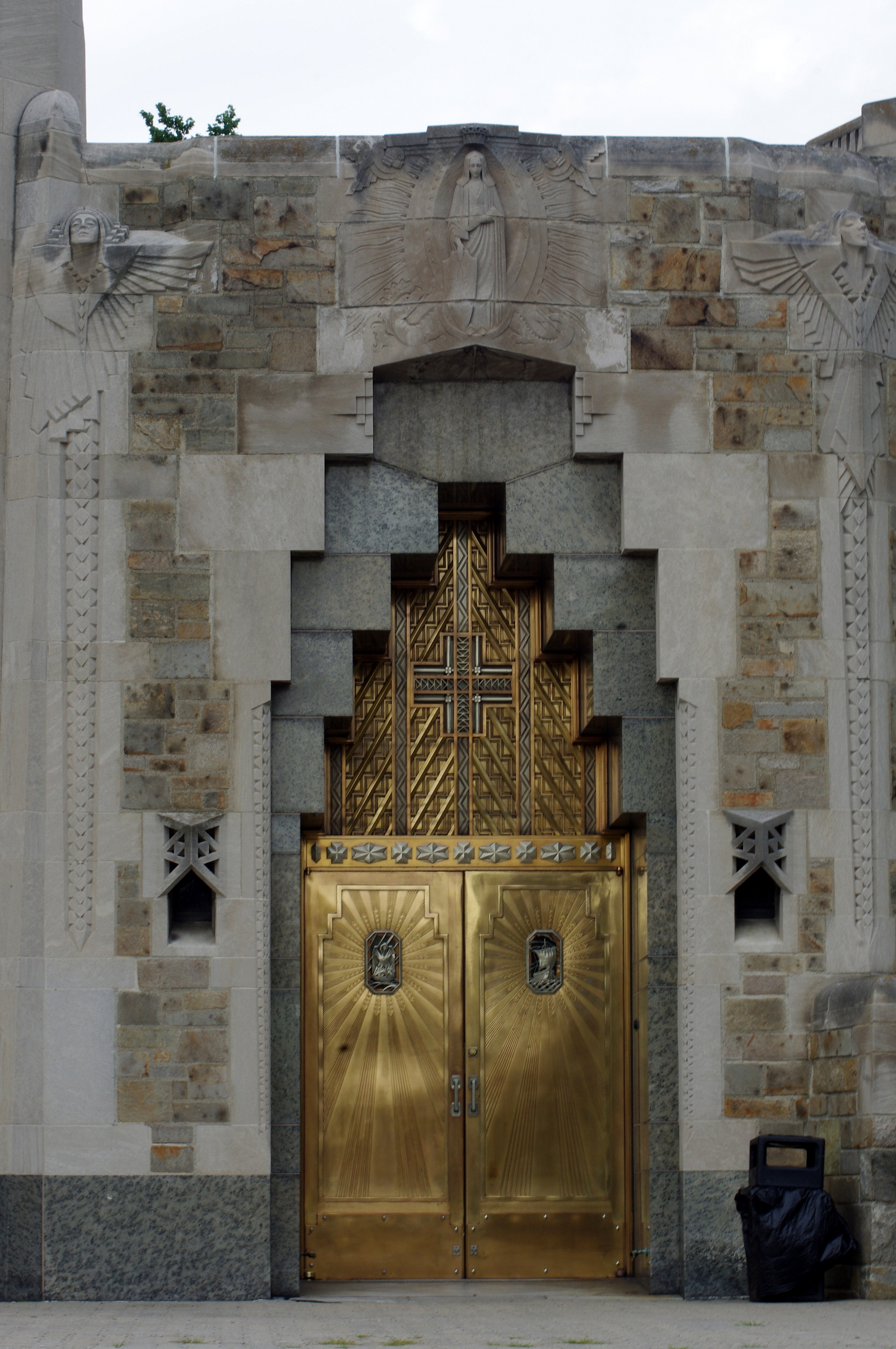
National Shrine of the Little Flower Basilica, Royal Oak

== Other cities ==
- Alpena County Courthouse, Alpena, 1934
- B and C Grocery Building, Royal Oak, 1939
- Bad Axe Theatre, Bad Axe, 1916
- Bay County Building, Bay City, 1933
- Berkley Screw Machine Products Factory (now U-Haul & Storage), Rochester, 1946
- Cass Theatre, Cass City, 1940
- Central Fire Station, Muskegon, 1930
- Cranbrook Schools, Bloomfield Hills, 1929
- Crystal Theatre, Crystal Falls, 1927
- Detroit & Northern Michigan Savings & Loan Association, Quincy Street Historic District, Hancock, 1939
- Ford Valve Plant, Northville, 1936
- Gladwin County Building, Gladwin, 1939
- Gravelly Shoal Light, Saginaw Bay, 1939
- Grays Reef Light, Lake Michigan, 1936
- Home Repair Services, Grand Rapids, c. 1940s
- Howard Miller Clock Company, Zeeland, 1940s
- Ionia Theatre, Ionia, 1875 and 1930s
- Jenison Fieldhouse, Michigan State University, East Lansing, 1940
- John H. Schaefer Building, Dearborn, 1930
- Keweenaw Waterway Upper Entrance, Lake Superior, 1937
- Landmark Inn, Marquette, 1930
- Mackinac County Courthouse, St. Ignace, 1936
- Macomb County Building, Mount Clemens, 1933
- McKenny Hall, Eastern Michigan University Historic District, Ypsilanti, 1931
- McKinley Elementary School, Wyandotte, 1938
- Michigan Theatre, Jackson, 1929
- Minneapolis Shoal Light Station, Green Bay, Lake Michigan, 1934
- Munising Fire Department and Department of Public Works, Munising, 1939
- Muskegon YMCA Building, Muskegon, 1926
- National Shrine of the Little Flower Basilica, Royal Oak, 1931 and 1936
- National Time & Signal Corporation, Oak Park, 1945
- Northern Michigan Bank and Trust, Iron Mountain, 1927
- Olin Memorial Health Center, East Lansing
- Old Regent Theatre, Allegan, 1919 and 1930s
- Oldsmobile Dealership (now offices), Grand Rapids
- Park Theatre, 108 East Clinton Street, Augusta, 1950
- Park Theatre (now Lincoln Park Lofts), Lincoln Park, 1925
- The People's State Bank (now Fifth Third Bank), Holland, 1928
- Roseville Theatre, 28325 Utica Road, Roseville, 1928
- Seaway Painting, 31801 Schoolcraft St, Livonia, 1940s
- St. Mary's Academy, St. Mary's Academy Historic District, Monroe, 1931
- St. Paul Apostolic Temple Church, 17400 Manderson Road, Highland Park, 1951
- State Bank of Perry, Perry, 1913
- Temple Israel, West Bloomfield Township, 1949
- Trolley Depot Building, Monroe, 1931
- Tuscola County Courthouse, Caro, 1933
- Twin Lakes Java Coffee Roaster (former Fanny's Tavern), Toivola
- Victoria Theater (now Garden Theater), Frankfort, 1923
- WJR Radio Transmitter Building, Riverview, 1934
- The Westown Theater, 611 Midland Street, Midland Street Commercial District, Bay City, 1915

== See also ==
- List of Art Deco architecture
- List of Art Deco architecture in the United States
