= Grand Boulevard (Detroit) =

Thoroughfare in Detroit

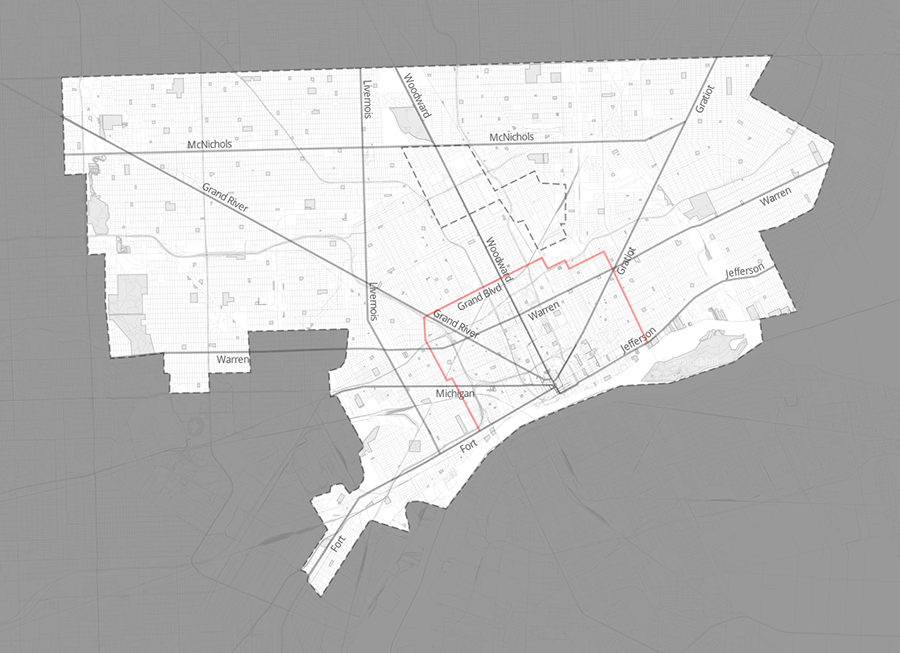
- Grand Boulevard highlighted in red
- Maintained by: City of Detroit
- West end: Jefferson Avenue, Detroit
- Major junctions: M-85 (Fort Street) I-75; US 12 (Michigan Avenue); I-94; I-96; M-5 (Grand River Avenue); M-10 (Lodge Freeway); M-1 (Woodward Avenue) M-3 (Gratiot Avenue)
- East end: Riverbank Drive, Belle Isle

Grand Boulevard (colloquially referred to by residents simply as the Boulevard) is a thoroughfare in Detroit that runs east to west in some places and north to south in other places and is approximately 11 miles in length. It once constituted the city limits of Detroit. Grand Boulevard is named the "Berry Gordy Jr. Boulevard" in the area where the Motown Historical Museum is located and the "General Motors Boulevard" in the area of Detroit's "New Center" where the Fisher Building and Cadillac Place (formerly the General Motors Building) are located.

== History ==
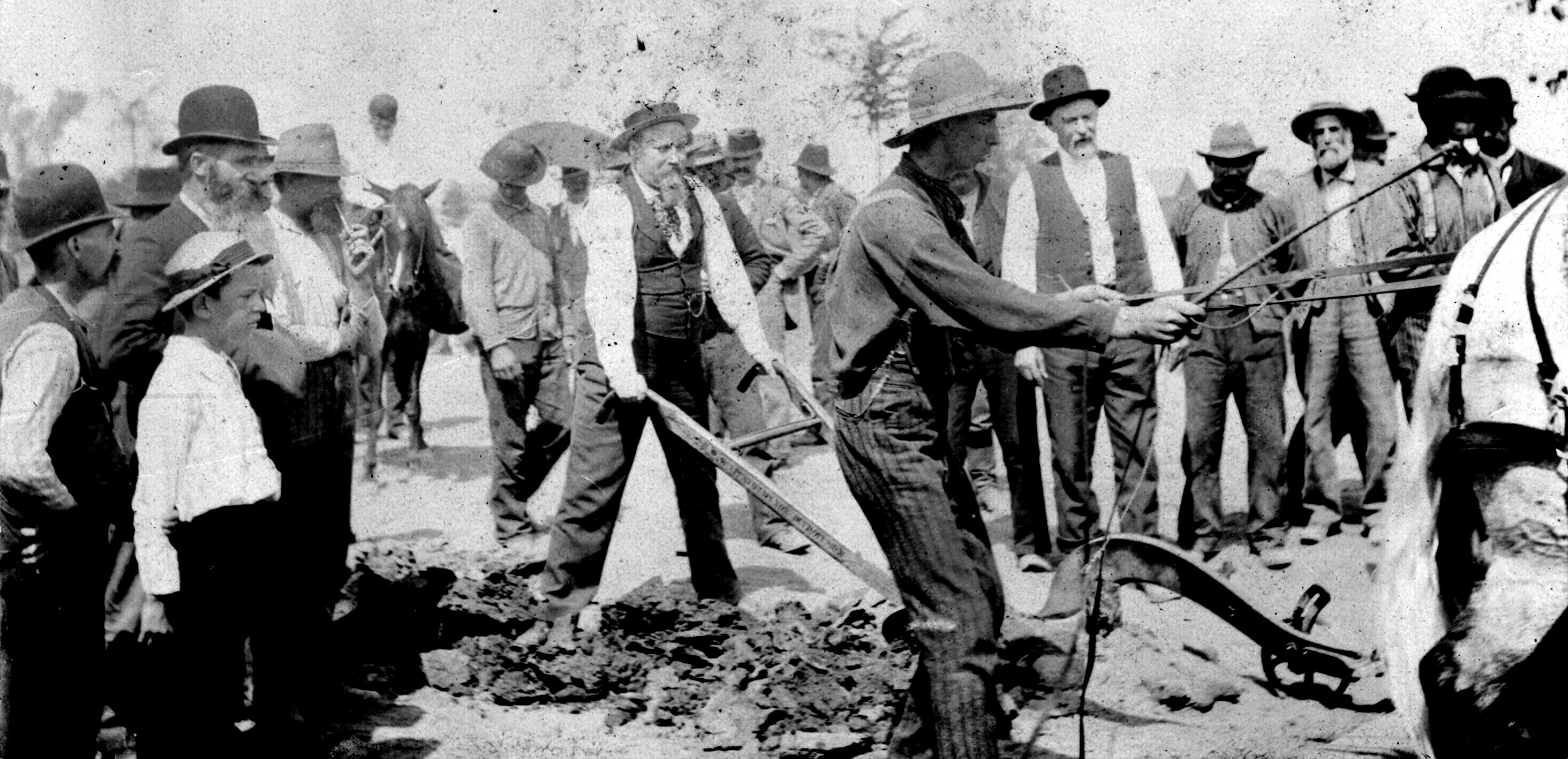
Mayor Pingree breaks ground.

As early as 1876, Bela Hubbard and other Detroiters were cognizant of the efforts of Baron Georges-Eugène Haussmann to make Paris into a beautiful city by designing parks, broad streets, and grand boulevards.

These citizens proposed adopting Haussmann's concepts by surrounding Detroit with its "Grand Boulevard." When Belle Isle was transferred from the state to the city of Detroit, Michigan legislator James Randall included a rider calling for the construction of this Grand Boulevard. However, the city government refused to begin work on the road right away, although a few people built homes along the Boulevard's proposed route.

Finally, in 1891, Detroit mayor Hazen S. Pingree supported the idea and broke ground on the construction of Grand Boulevard, a ring road that wrapped around the city of Detroit. The Boulevard ran for 12 miles (19 km), curving from the Detroit River on the west and returning to that river on the east, crossing Woodward Avenue at a point approximately 3 miles (4.8 km) north of the downtown area. The Boulevard was originally thought to represent the absolute limit of the city's expansion. However, tremendous growth at the beginning of the 20th century quickly pushed the city limits far beyond Grand Boulevard to its north, its east, and its west.

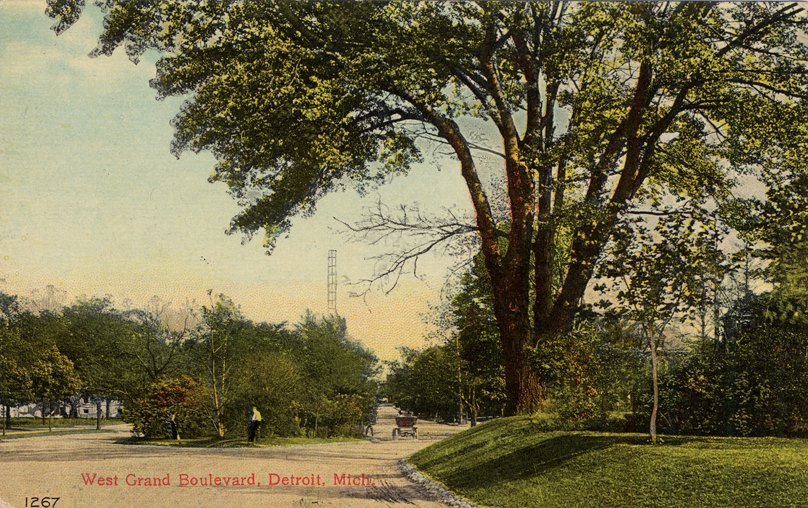
A view of West Grand Boulevard circa 1913

By 1913, Grand Boulevard was completed, encircling the central most and oldest portion of the city. It was generally recognized as a major attraction of the city; the entire length was decorated with trees, shrubbery, and flowerbeds.

By the early 1980s, to accommodate the construction of a new General Motors plant, portions of East Grand Boulevard were reconfigured. This was part of a controversial use of eminent domain by the City of Detroit which allowed for demolition of a substantial portion of the nearby Poletown neighborhood in order to make way for the plant. The controversy sparked opposition within the neighborhood. The Michigan Supreme Court, in the 1981 case of Poletown Neighborhood Council v. City of Detroit, settled the matter by ruling that the project did constitute a legitimate use of eminent domain authority and that the evictions could proceed.

Many years ago, the streetcar route which traveled along much of Grand Boulevard, as well as on neighboring streets parallel to Grand Boulevard, was formally called the "Grand Belt" line because of Grand Boulevard's belt-like configuration around the most central part of Detroit. The subsequent bus route which likewise traveled on some, but not all, of Grand Boulevard retained the "Grand Belt" name until a service cut in 2009 eliminated that public transit coverage entirely.

== Landmarks ==
	Name	Image	Location	Summary
1	Lee Plaza		2240 W. Grand Blvd. 42°21′34″N 83°5′19″W	
2	Motown Record Corporation		2648 W. Grand Blvd. 42°21′52″N 83°5′2″W	
3	Henry Ford Hospital		2799 W. Grand Blvd. 42°22′0″N 83°5′2″W	
4	Fisher Building		3011 W. Grand Blvd. 42°22′8.5″N 83°4′36.92″W	Built in 1927 by the Fisher brothers, who owned Fisher Body of General Motors, this skyscraper is one of the greatest works by architect Albert Kahn. The Fishers spent lavishly to make this Art Deco masterpiece a monumental gift to Detroit and one of the most finely detailed major commercial buildings in the United States.
5	Cadillac Place		3044 W. Grand Blvd. 42°22′7″N 83°4′32″W	Housing offices for the state of Michigan, it was originally known as the General Motors Building until 2002.
6	Hotel St. Regis		3071 W. Grand Blvd. 42°22′12″N 83°04′30″W	
7	East Grand Boulevard Historic District		E. Grand Blvd., bet. E. Jefferson Ave. and Mack Ave. 42°21′12″N 83°0′22″W	
8	Packard Automotive Plant		1539 E. Grand Blvd. 42.3782°N 83.0270°W	The Packard Plant was a former automotive-manufacturing-facility that crossed over Grand Boulevard; the connecting walkway was destroyed in a windstorm in 2019. Portions of the plant were demolished in 2022, 2023, and 2024.
9	Saint Paul Manor Apartments		356 E. Grand Blvd. 42°21′13″N 83°0′21″W	
10	El Tovar Apartments		320 E. Grand Blvd. 42°21′12″N 83°0′20″W	
11	Kingston Arms Apartments		296 E. Grand Blvd. 42°21′16″N 83°0′28″W	
12	Belle Isle		Detroit River, at the base of Grand Blvd. 42°20′32″N 82°58′46″W	Belle Isle is a 982-acre (3.97 km^{2}) island park in the Detroit River, home to the Anna Scripps Whitcomb Conservatory, the Detroit Yacht Club, the Detroit Boat Club, the Dossin Great Lakes Museum, a Coast Guard post, and a municipal golf course. It is the largest island park in the United States.

== See also ==
Outer Drive
