= East Grand Boulevard Historic District =

Historic district in Michigan, United States

- U.S. National Register of Historic Places
- U.S. Historic district
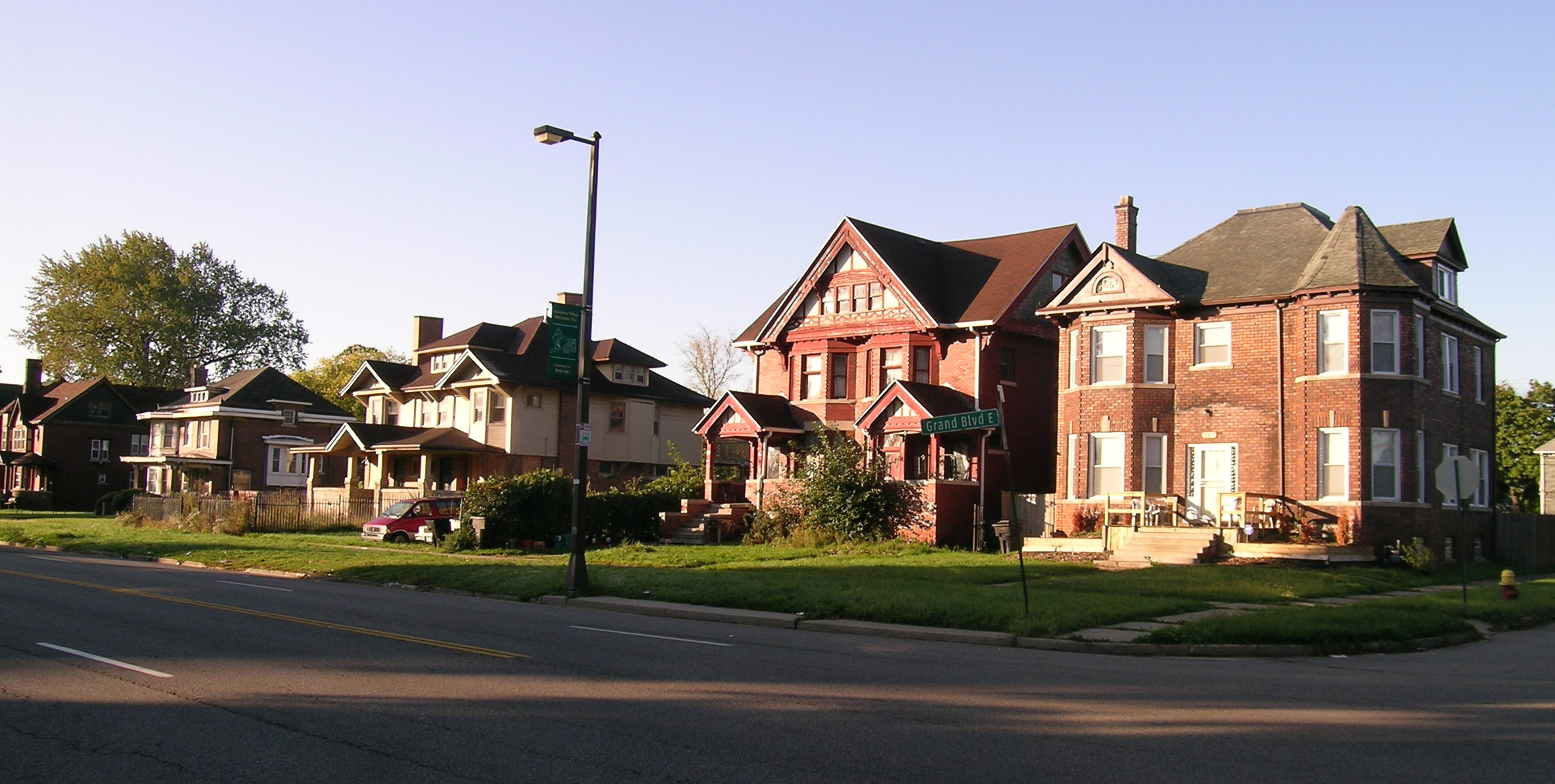
- Streetscape on Grand Boulevard
- Interactive map
- Location: Detroit, Michigan, U.S.
- Coordinates: 42°21′12″N 83°0′22″W
- Architect: C. F. Barnes, R.C. Geis, et al.
- Architectural style: Renaissance, Colonial Revival
- NRHP reference No.: 99001468
- Added to NRHP: November 30, 1999

The East Grand Boulevard Historic District is a historic district located along East Grand Boulevard between East Jefferson Avenue and Mack Avenue in Detroit, Michigan. The district was listed on the National Register of Historic Places in 1999.

== History ==
During the late 19th century, creating wide, graceful streets was seen as a way to create a beautiful city. After much debate, in the 1890s Detroit adopted the idea of creating a "Grand Boulevard" encircling the city. By 1913, the landscaped Grand Boulevard was generally recognized as a major adornment of the city, and a prestigious address in which to reside.

Houses built along this section of the Boulevard were among the grandest in the city at the time they were built; however, by the mid-1920s, the appeal of living along Grand Boulevard declined. During the Great Depression and later during World War II, some of these massive elegant homes in this historic district were cut up into small apartments. Currently, this section of Grand Boulevard has become a mixed-use neighborhood. Only a few of these homes are still used as single-family residences; many serve as group homes for those who need institutional care.

== Description ==
The East Grand Boulevard Historic District includes a few moderate-sized apartment buildings and numerous large homes. The apartment buildings in the district include the El Tovar Apartments, Saint Paul Manor Apartments, and Kingston Arms Apartments. Structures in this district were constructed primarily between 1900 and 1925.

== Gallery ==
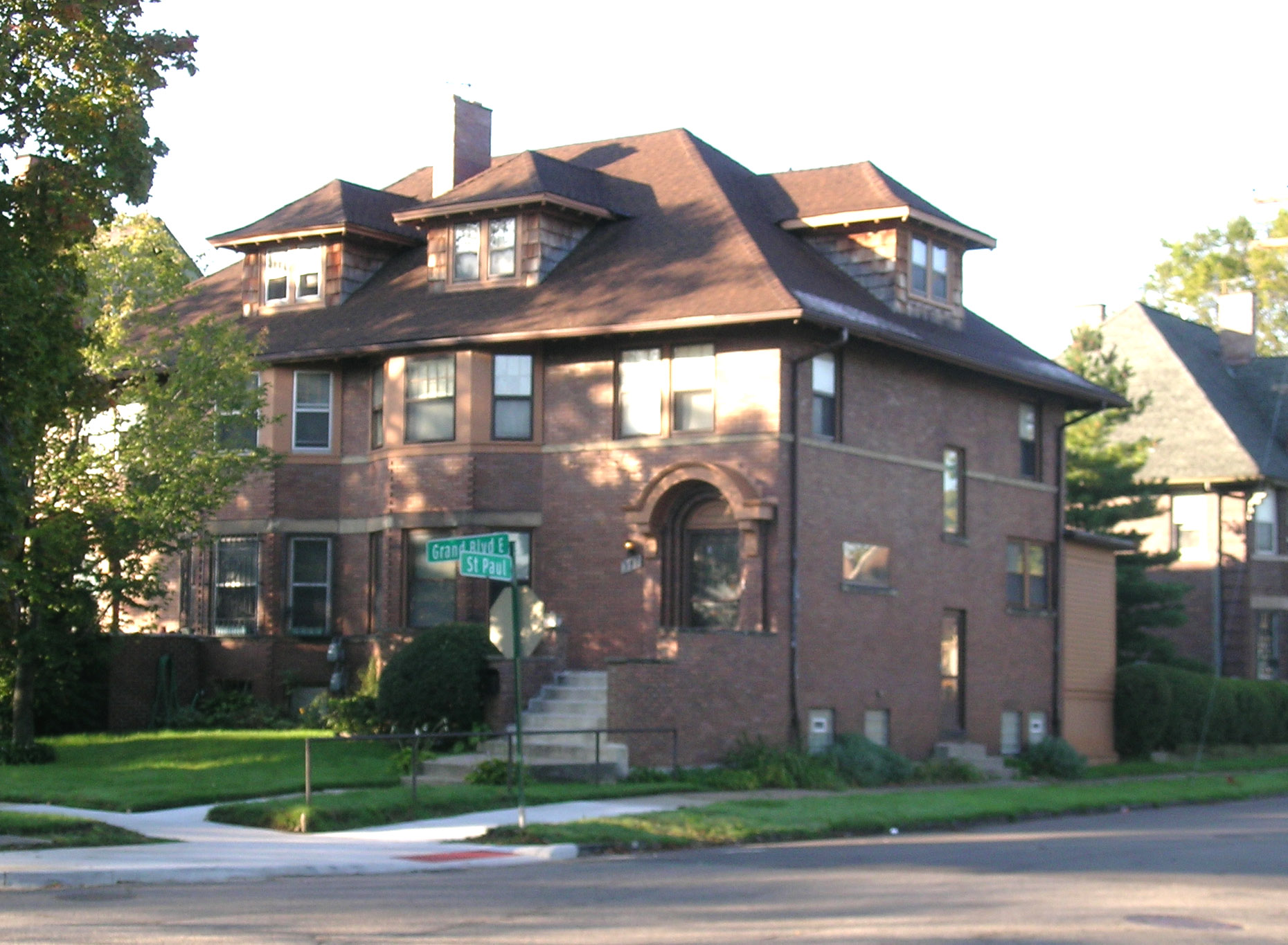
Home on Grand Boulevard

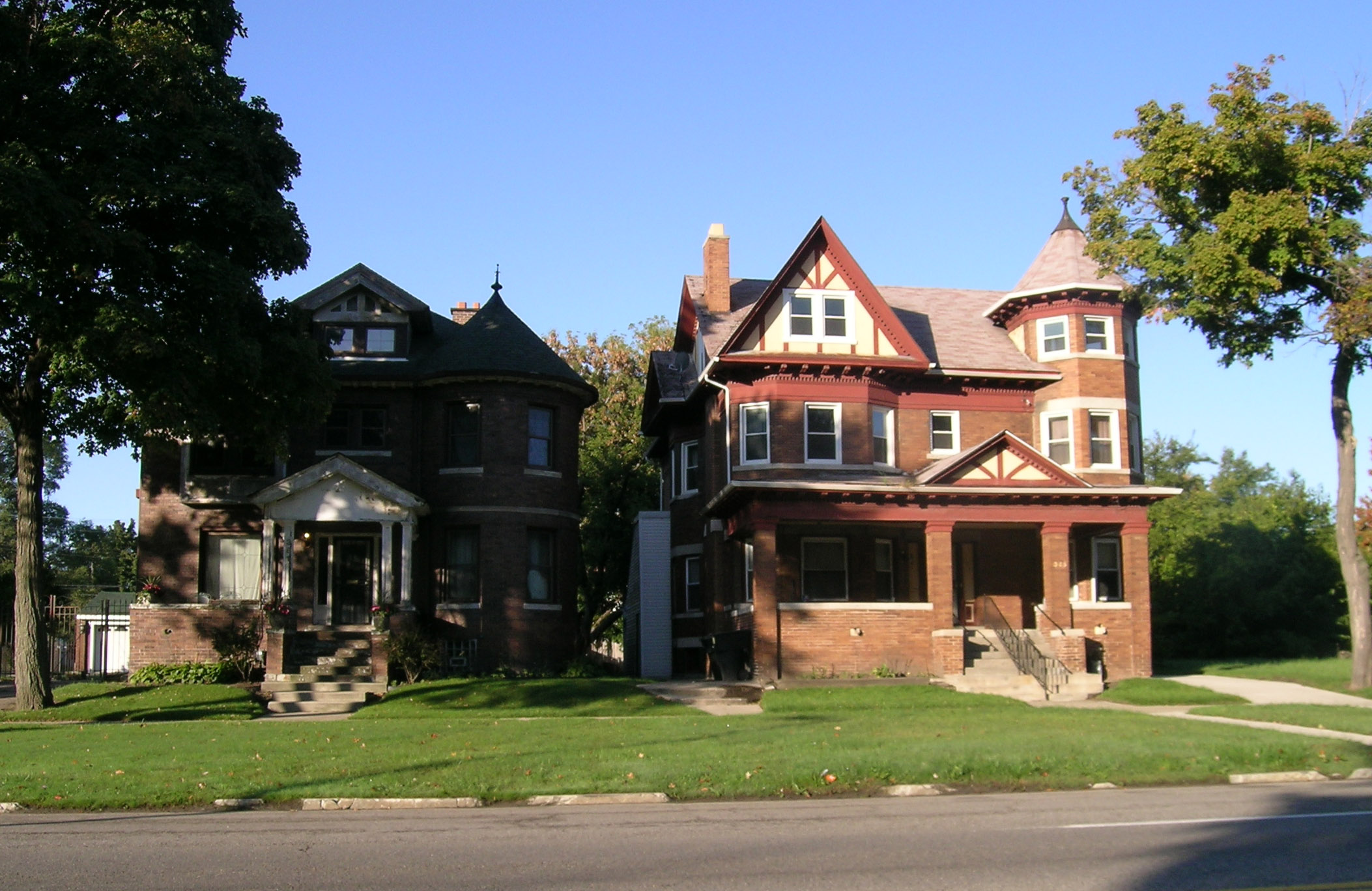
Homes on Grand Boulevard

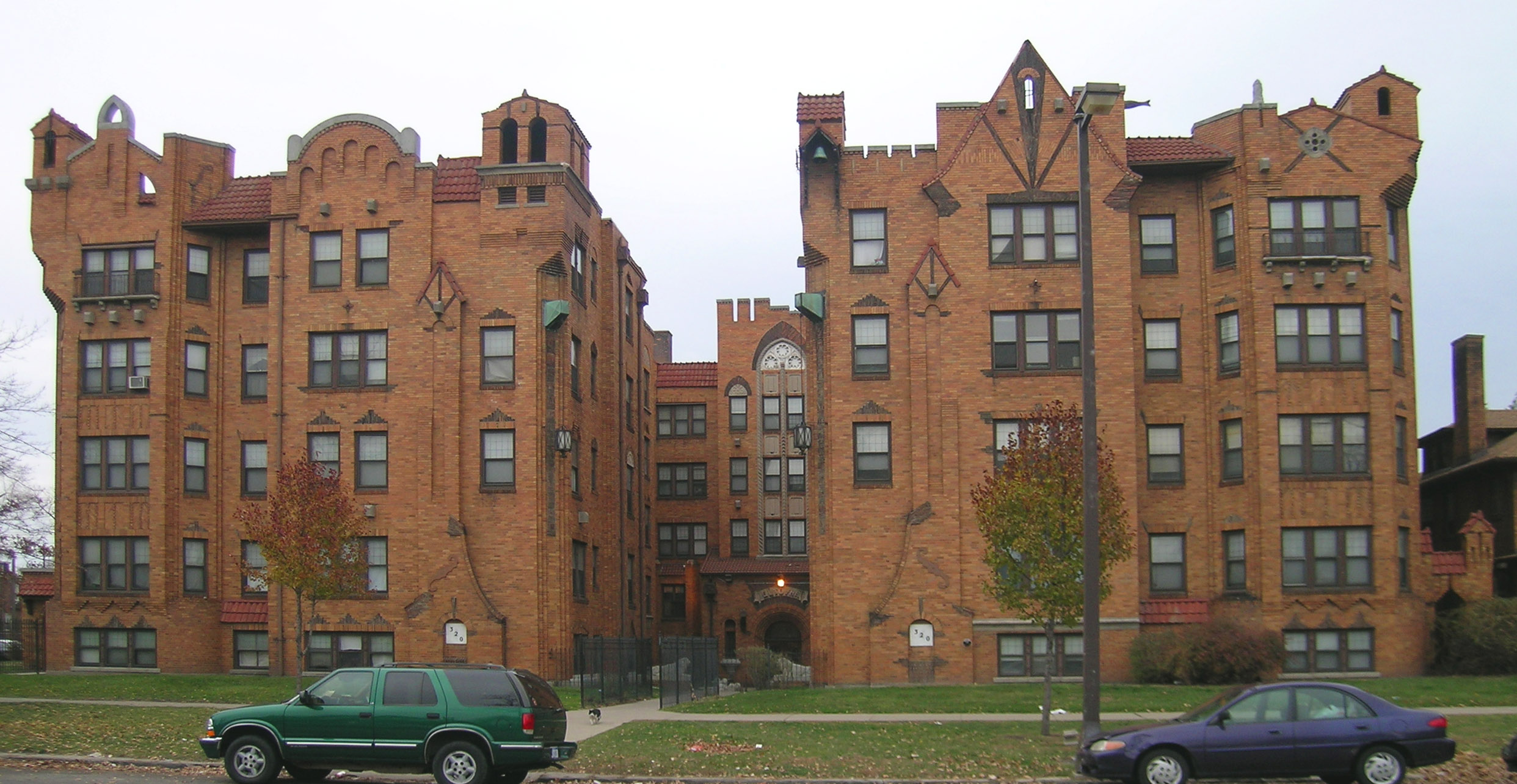
El Tovar Apartments

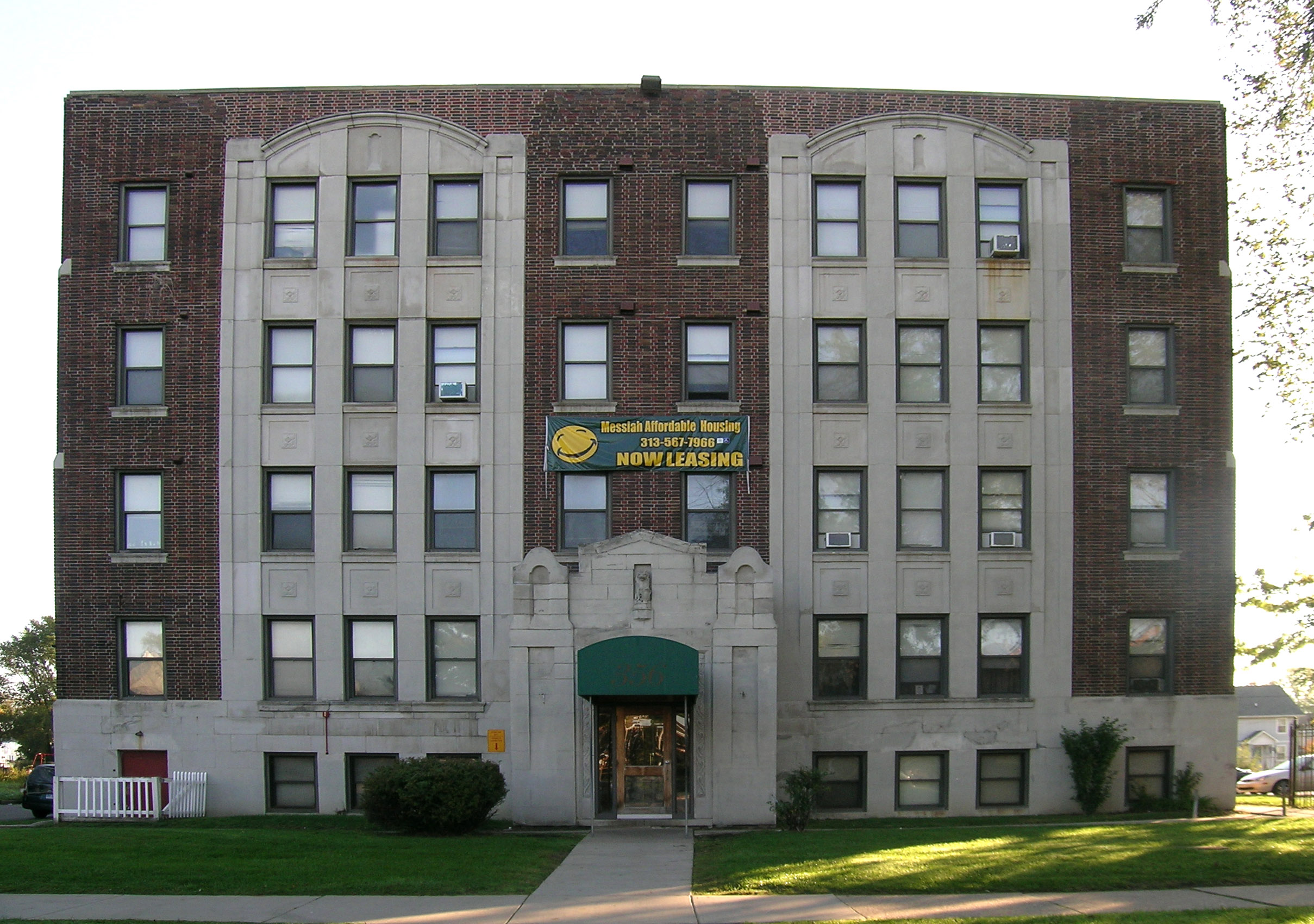
Saint Paul Manor Apartments
