= Kingston Arms Apartments =

- U.S. National Register of Historic Places
- U.S. Historic district – Contributing property
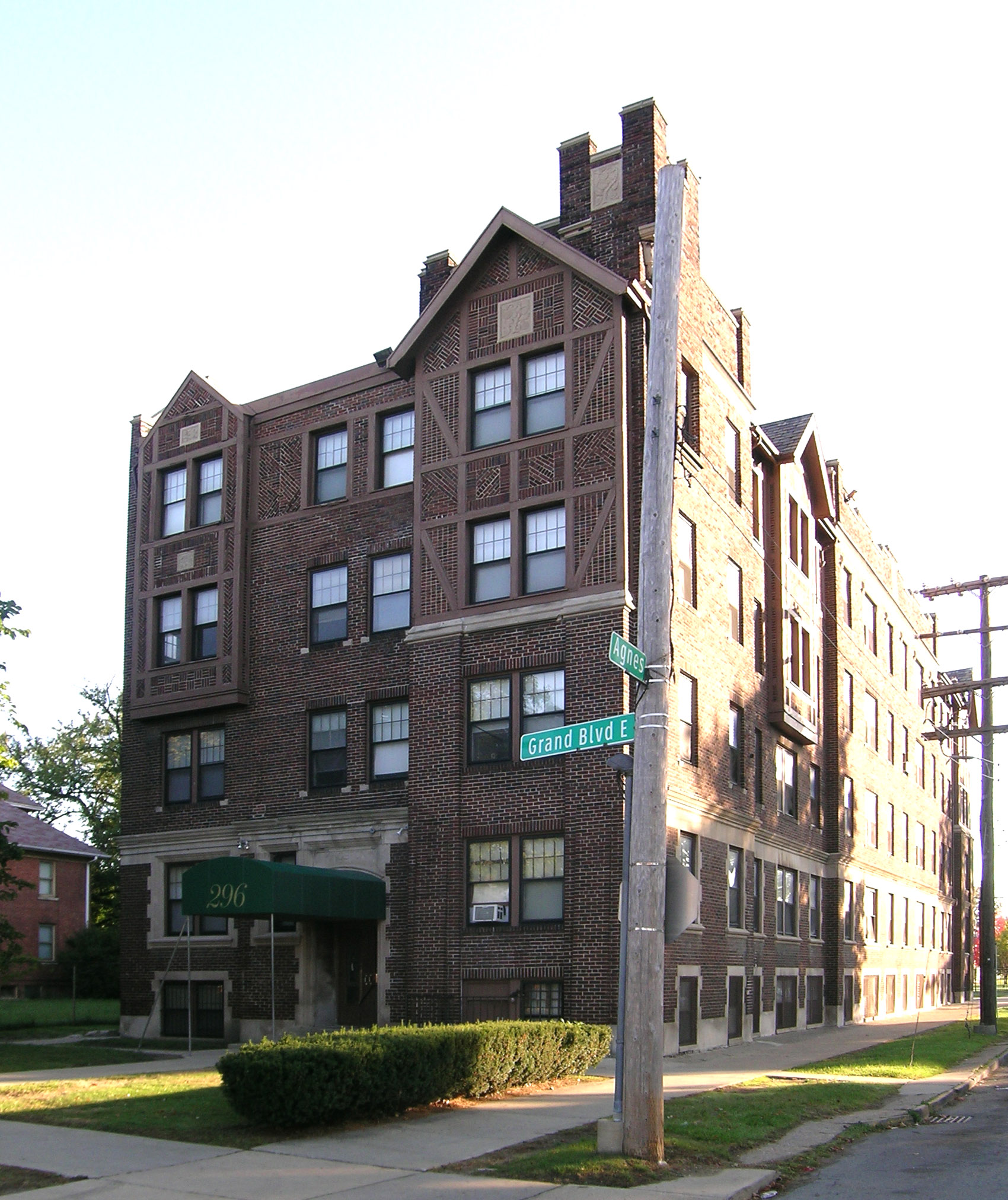

- Location within Michigan Location within the United States
- Interactive map
- Location: 296 E. Grand Blvd. Detroit, Michigan
- Coordinates: 42°21′16″N 83°0′28″W
- Area: less than one acre
- Built: 1924
- Architect: Jacob I. Weinberg
- Architectural style: Tudor Revival
- Part of: East Grand Boulevard Historic District (ID99001468)
- NRHP reference No.: 99000433

Significant dates
- Added to NRHP: April 9, 1999
- Designated CP: November 30, 1999

The Kingston Arms Apartments is an apartment building located at 296 East Grand Boulevard in Detroit, Michigan, in the East Grand Boulevard Historic District. It was listed on the National Register of Historic Places in 1999. The Kingston Arms, built in 1924, is a representative example of the rise of middle-class apartment buildings in pre-Depression era Detroit.

== Description ==
The Kingston Arms is a 4 1/2-story apartment building with 24 apartments. The building is rectangular in plan with a front façade facing East Grand Boulevard and a longer façade facing the side street. Retail space with a separate entrance is located in the basement.

The facade is predominantly brick, trimmed with stone around windows, at the building base, and at the parapet. The upper two floors have recessed half timbers inset in projecting bays, with gables above. The original entrance doors and windows are still in place. Other than paint, the facades have received no alterations since they were constructed.

The interior of the building has a lobby with wainscoting and a high ceiling. Ceramic tiles in the lobby appear to include Pewabic tiles laid in an unusual diagonal pattern.

== See also ==
- National Register of Historic Places listings in Detroit, Michigan

== History ==
A building permit was initially issued to Albert A. Rose for the Kingston Arms in 1916; however, due to a lawsuit relating to the ownership of the land, construction of the building was delayed until 1924. Construction took place during 1924-25. The building remained in Rose's hands through the Great Depression, but ownership changed in about 1937. The building has remained as apartments throughout its life. It is currently owned by Messiah Housing Corporation, which purchased the building in 1990 and refurbished twice since then. Messiah Housing also owns the nearby Saint Paul Manor Apartments and El Tovar Apartments.
