= Bay County Building =

- U.S. National Register of Historic Places
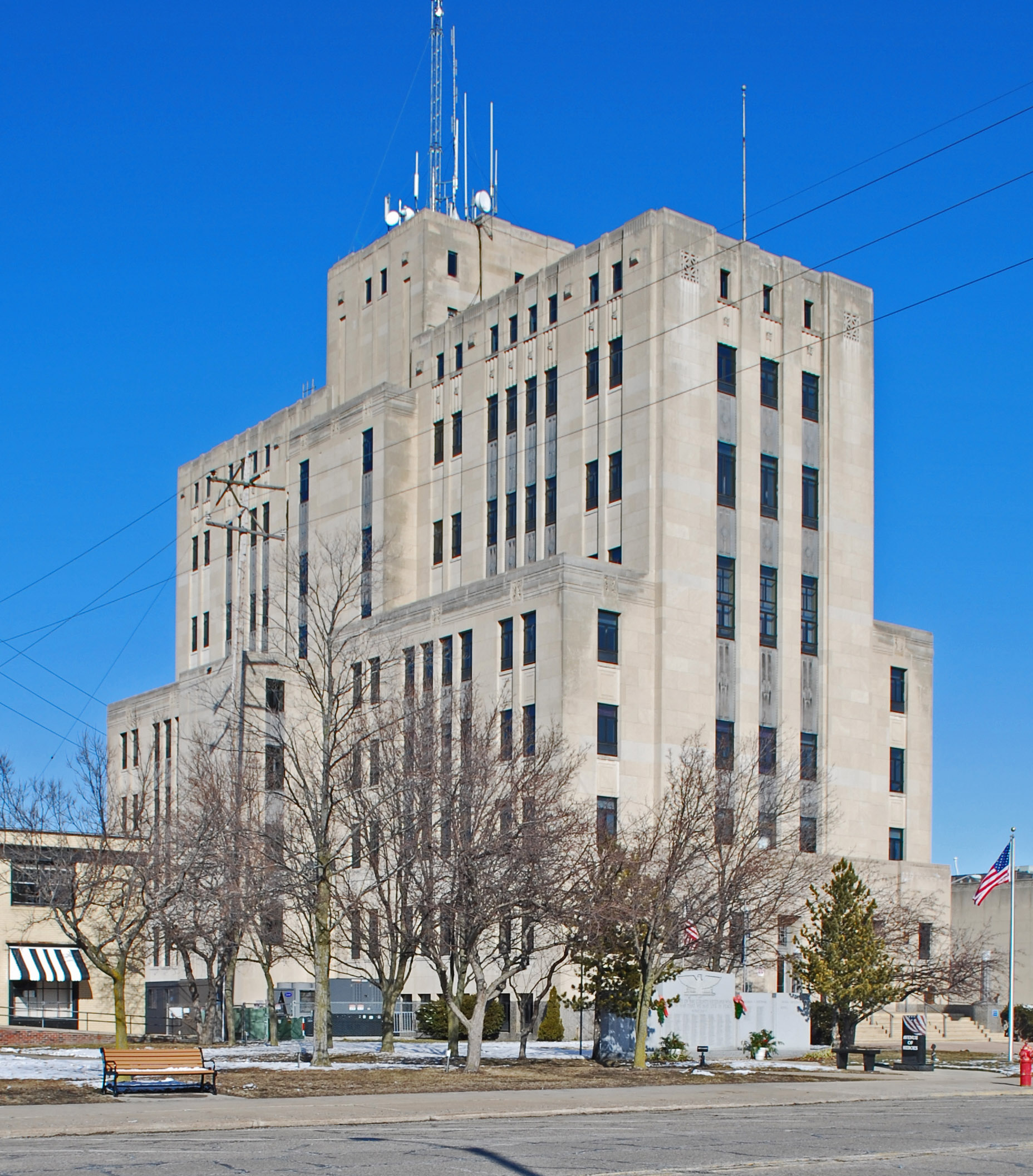

- Location within Michigan Location within the United States
- Interactive map
- Location: 515 Center Ave., Bay City, Michigan
- Coordinates: 43°35′54″N 83°53′6″W
- Area: 1.5 acres (0.61 ha)
- Built: 1933-1934
- Built by: Bay City Stone Company
- Architect: Joseph C. Goddeyne
- Architectural style: Art Deco
- NRHP reference No.: 82002825
- Added to NRHP: March 25, 1982

The Bay County Building is a government building located at 515 Center Avenue in Bay City, Michigan. It was listed on the National Register of Historic Places in 1982.

== History ==
Bay County was founded in 1858. The first courthouse was a small clapboard structure at the foot of Fourth Street in Bay City. In 1867, this had grown too small, and a new courthouse was erected at this location, opening in 1868. By the late 1920s, however, Judge Samuel G. Houghton was campaigning for a new courthouse. In 1931, voters approved, and in 1932 the county Board of Supervisors selected local architect Joseph C. Goddeyne to design the building and Bay City Stone Company to construct it. The project began in 1932 with the clearing of the site and the demolition of the old courthouse. The cornerstone for the new courthouse was laid on April 13, 1933. The building was completed in 1934. The building is still used by the county.

== Description ==
The Bay County Building is an eight-story steel-framed Art Deco structure sheathed in limestone and granite. The main facade has an entry portico on the slightly projecting main bay with three deeply set doorways with classic Art Deco surrounds. Piers rise above from the weighted lower section, and the upper levels are stepped back. The center bay has three trabeated windows in simple metal frames on each floor. Three-story side bays with stacks of windows flank the center. The side facades are similar, with a weighed base and three stories above with trabeated windows. The higher floors are stepped back. One side has an entryway.

On the interior, the front foyer and first floor corridor have molded edge marble panels lining the walls and a decoratively colored, tile-edged terrazzo floor. Above, a wide plaster painted fascia runs along the top. The probate and circuit courtrooms have plaster walls with paneled oak wainscoting and a speaker's dais constructed of the same deep-stained oak.
