= Michigan Bell Building =

- U.S. National Register of Historic Places
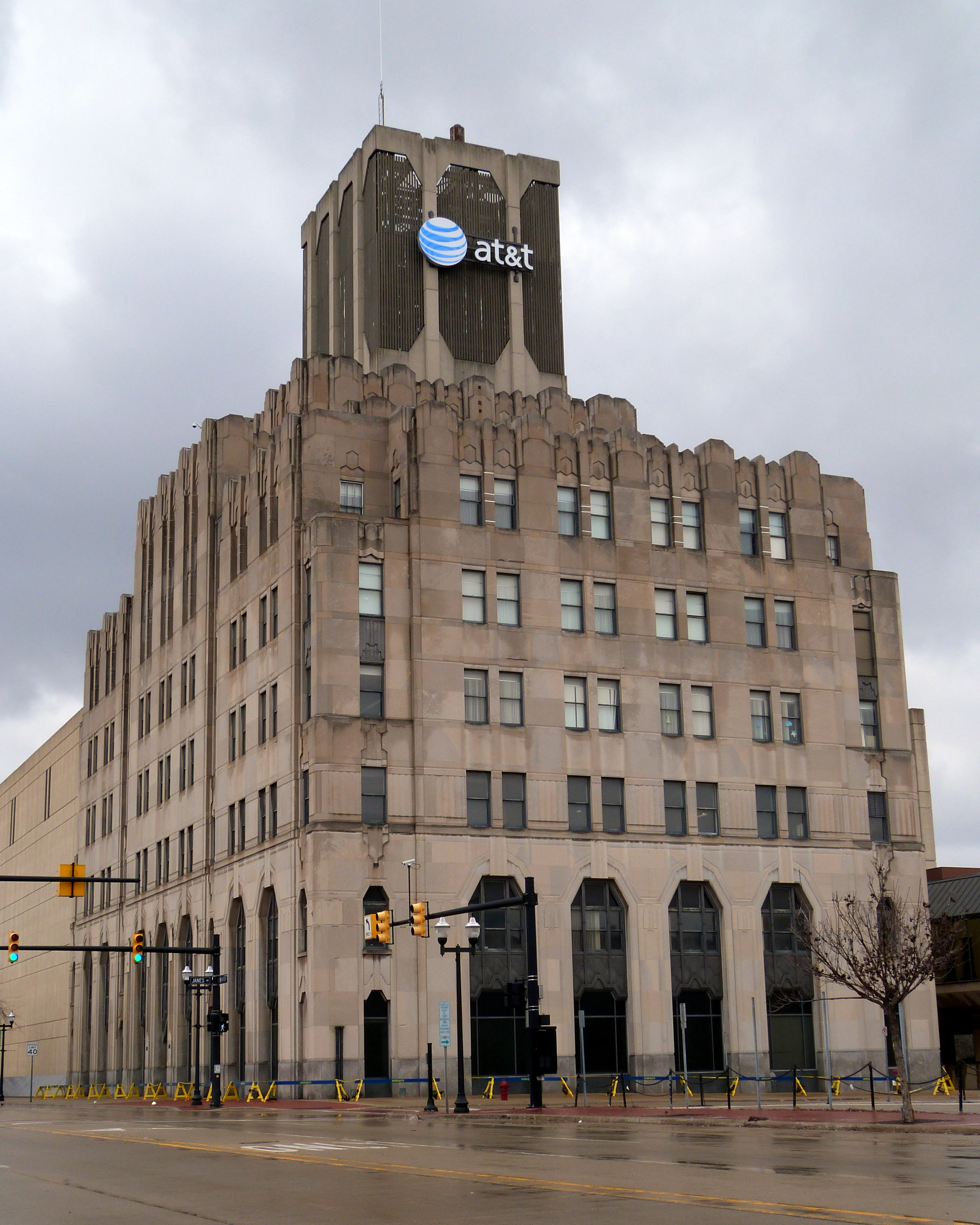
- Interactive map
- Location: 309 S. Washington, Saginaw, Michigan
- Coordinates: 43°25′50″N 83°56′25″W
- Area: 1 acre (0.40 ha)
- Built: 1930
- Architect: Smith, Hinchman & Grylls
- Architectural style: Art Deco
- MPS: Center Saginaw MRA
- NRHP reference No.: 82002870
- Added to NRHP: July 9, 1982

The Michigan Bell Building is an industrial and office building located at 309 South Washington in Saginaw, Michigan. It was listed on the National Register of Historic Places in 1982.

== History ==
In the late 1920s, Michigan Bell needed a new facility to house dial telephone equipment. They engaged the Detroit firm of Smith, Hinchman & Grylls to design this building. Construction on the building began in 1930. An addition was constructed in 1974. The flexibility of the building allowed Michigan Bell, and later AT&T, to continue using the building through the 2010s.

== Description ==
The Michigan Bell Building is a seven-story limestone Art Deco structure with stepped-back upper floors. The first two floors are unified behind tall window openings. Wide stone bandcourses separate the third through the sixth floors. Floors seven and eight are set back and decorated with low relief chevrons. To accommodate the heavy equipment, the building was designed to hold over double the floor weight per square foot of a standard office building.
