= Muskegon YMCA Building =

- U.S. National Register of Historic Places
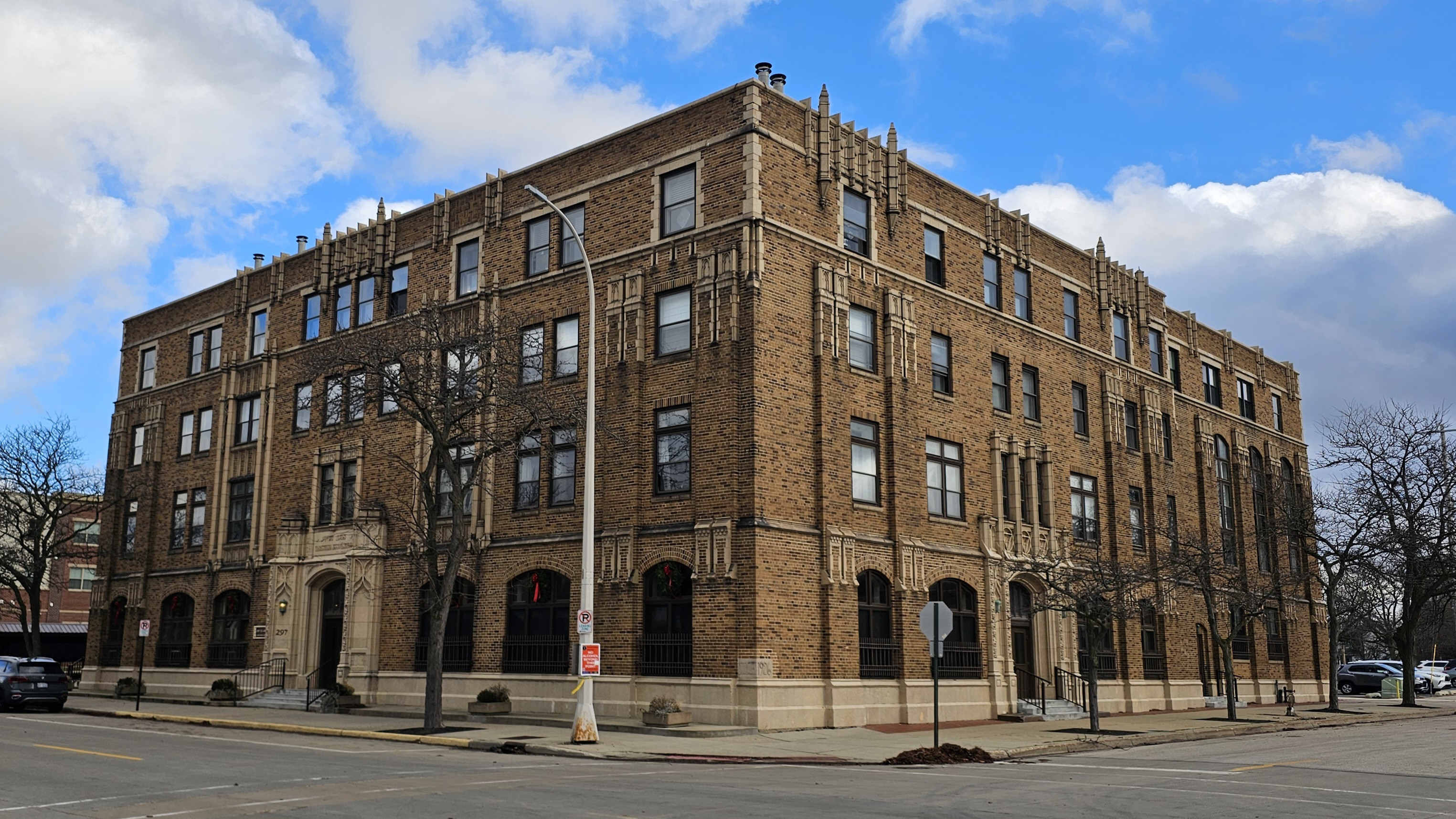
- The building in December 2023

- Location within Michigan Location within the United States
- Interactive map
- Location: 297 W. Clay Ave., Muskegon, Michigan
- Coordinates: 43°14′7″N 86°15′2″W
- Area: less than one acre
- Built: 1926
- Architect: Foeller, Schoeber & Stevenson; Edwin E. Vallentine
- Architectural style: Late Gothic Revival, Art Deco
- NRHP reference No.: 82002858
- Added to NRHP: August 11, 1982

The Muskegon YMCA Building is a YMCA building located at 297 West Clay Avenue in Muskegon, Michigan. It was listed on the National Register of Historic Places in 1982. It has been renovated, and currently houses 297 Clay Condominiums.

== History ==
A Muskegon chapter of the YMCA first formed in 1890. However, the Panic of 1893 forced the group into insolvency, and it closed in 1897. However, in 1916, a group of civic leaders met with some local young men to re-organize a YMCA chapter. In 1918, the group moved into the city's old armory, and in 1923 the group moved into the newer and larger armory. In 1925, a fund-raising drive was launched with a goal of raising $70,000 to fund a new YMCA building. Muskegon residents wound up pledging $350,000 in donations.

The Muskegon YMCA engaged the architectural firms of Foeller, Schoeber and Stevenson of Green Bay, Wisconsin and Edwin E. Vallentine of Muskegon, who worked cooperatively to design this building. Construction began in 1926, and the building opened in 1927. The building was heavily used, and by 1929, an addition was necessary. To meet the need, the building was mortgaged and a new $30,000 dormitory section was constructed. The onset of the Great Depression damaged the YMCA's ability to repay the loan, but at the same time emphasized the need in the community for the Y's services.

The debt was retired in 1941, and the YMCA continued to utilize the building until the late 1970s, when the size of the Clay Avenue facility was no longer adequate. The organization constructed a new facility on the Muskegon waterfront and moved out of this building. The facility remained vacant until 1981, when plans were made to rehabilitate the structure.

== Description ==
The Muskegon YMCA Building is a four-story building constructed of blond brick with limestone trim. The building exterior displays a collection of Art Deco styling overlaid with Late Gothic Revival ornamentation. The front facade is seven bays wide with balanced massing and window openings. The main entryway is in the center bay, framed by Gothic-inspired side piers and capped with a limestone block bearing the name of the building. The bays to each side contain rounded arch windows. A molded limestone bandcourse runs across the top of the first floor. The second and third floors are connected visually by limestone bandcourses and brick piers. The fourth floor is separated from the third by a limestone bandcourse.

One side of the building also faces the street. This facade is visually tied to the main one through the use of similar rounded arch window assemblies at the first floor level and the use of limestone bandcourses The other side and rear facades are much simpler.
