= Saint Paul Manor Apartments =

- U.S. National Register of Historic Places
- U.S. Historic district – Contributing property
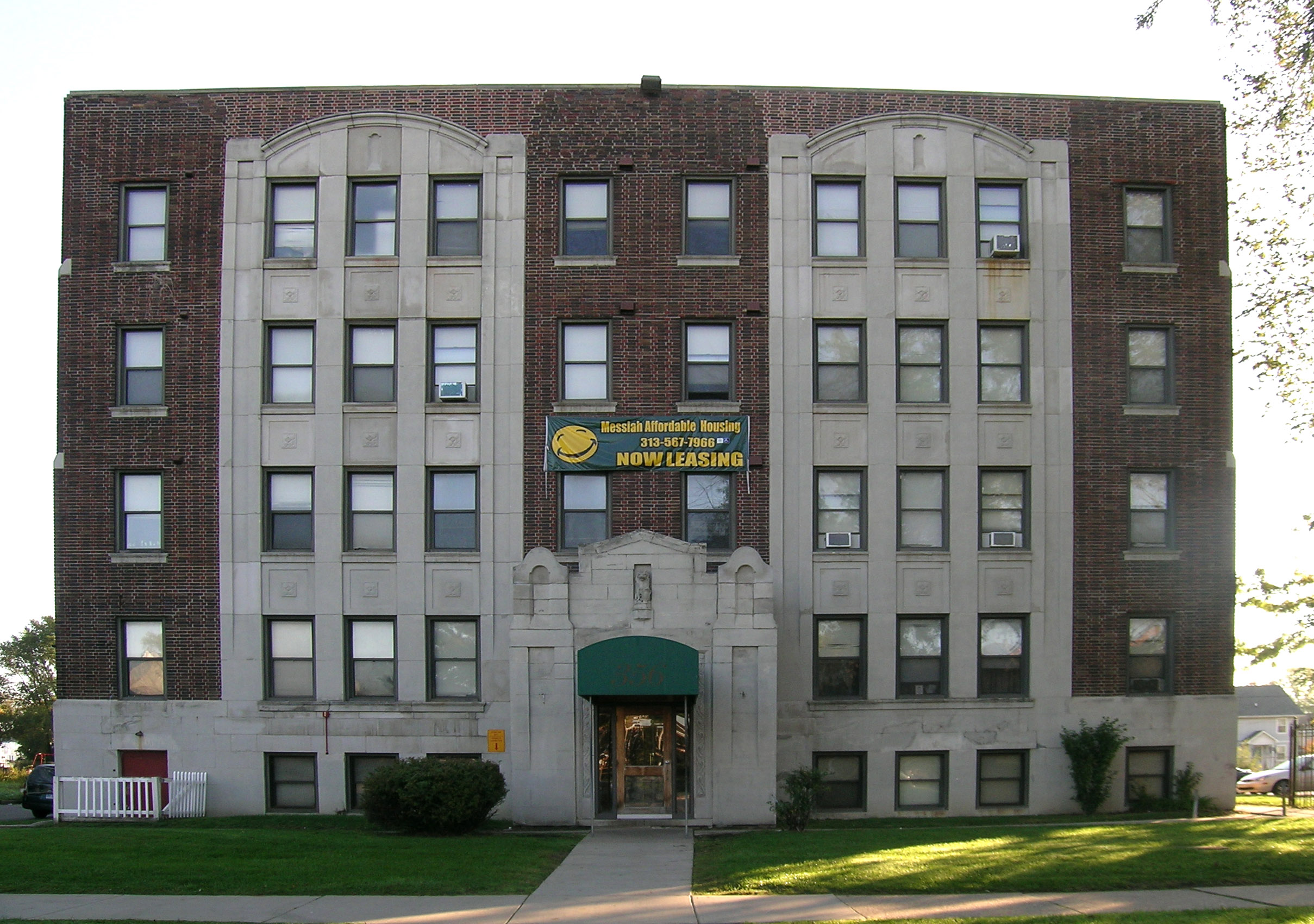

- Location within Michigan Location within the United States
- Interactive map
- Location: 356 East Grand Blvd. Detroit, Michigan
- Coordinates: 42°21′13″N 83°0′21″W
- Area: less than one acre
- Built: 1925
- Architect: Robert J. West
- Architectural style: Art Deco
- Part of: East Grand Boulevard Historic District (ID99001468)
- NRHP reference No.: 99000435

Significant dates
- Added to NRHP: April 9, 1999
- Designated CP: November 30, 1999

The Saint Paul Manor Apartments is an apartment building located at 356 East Grand Boulevard in Detroit, Michigan, in the East Grand Boulevard Historic District. It was listed on the National Register of Historic Places in 1999.

== Description ==
The St. Paul Manor Apartments are a 4-1/2-story U-shaped brick Art Deco structure containing 36 apartments. A commercial space is located in the basement. The main facades contain precast concrete/stone panels rising from a heavy precast base and stretching the full height of the building, topped with half-round arches. These panels surround each window opening, and incorporate ornamental medallions and various relief trim panel styles. The entrance is in the center of the building, within a projecting one-story vestibule.

== History ==
The Saint Paul Manor was built as an upper-middle-class apartment building in 1925. The building was fully occupied by 1926. However, the owners, Morris Rosenberg and Louis Kaplan, ran into financial problems in 1928 and had to sell the building in early 1929. The Saint Paul Manor served as an apartment building for the entirety of its existence. The building is currently owned by Messiah Housing Corporation, which refurbished the building in 1987. Messiah Housing also owns the nearby El Tovar Apartments and Kingston Arms Apartments.

== See also ==
- National Register of Historic Places listings in Detroit, Michigan
