= El Tovar Apartments =

- U.S. National Register of Historic Places
- U.S. Historic district – Contributing property
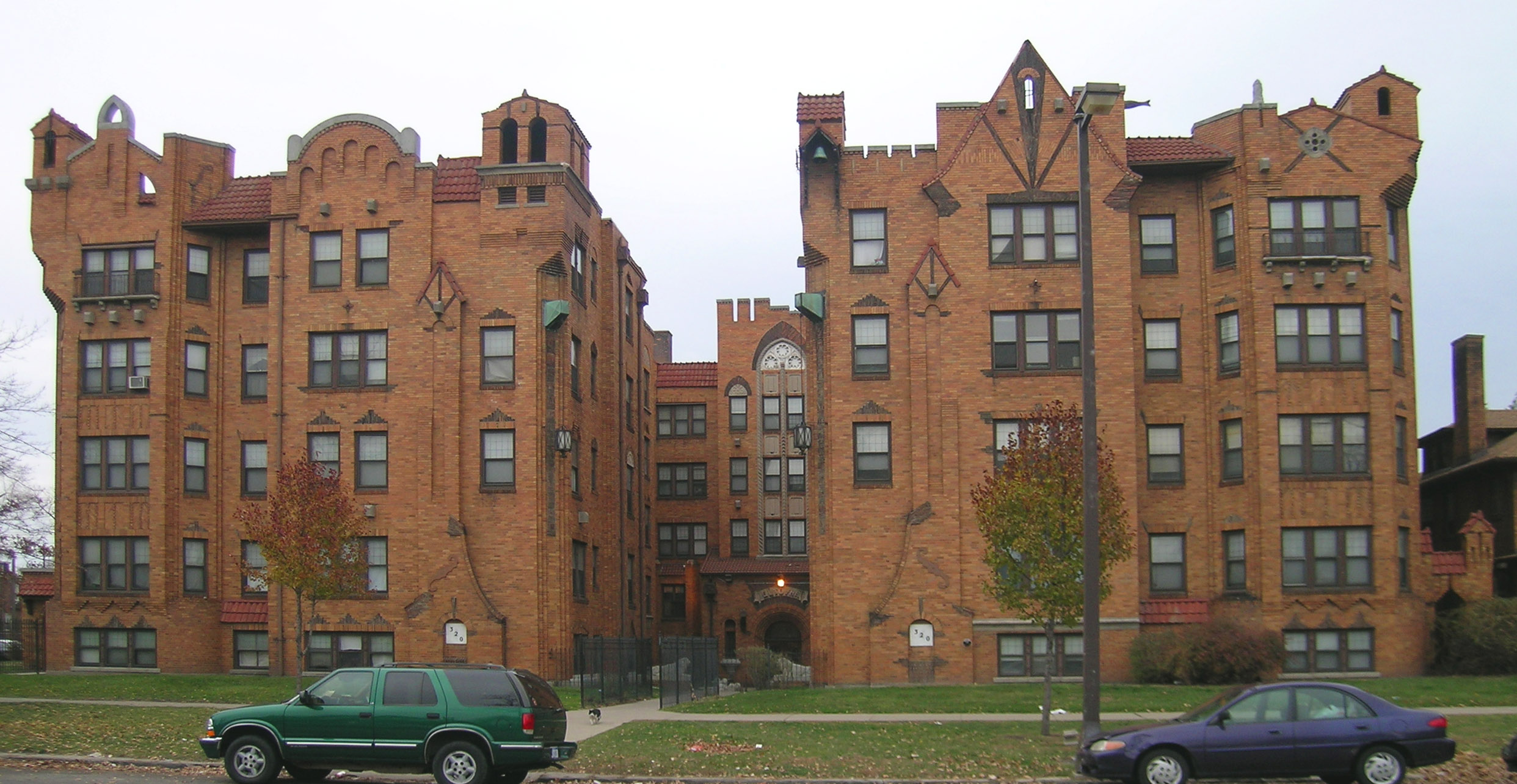
- Interactive map
- Location: 320 East Grand Boulevard; Detroit, Michigan
- Coordinates: 42°21′12″N 83°0′20″W
- Built: 1928
- Built by: Jacob P. and Walter F. Sumeracki
- Architect: Robert J. West
- Architectural style: Late 19th And 20th Century Revivals, Art Deco
- Part of: East Grand Boulevard Historic District (ID99001468)
- NRHP reference No.: 91000214

Significant dates
- Added to NRHP: February 28, 1991
- Designated CP: November 30, 1999

The El Tovar Apartments is an apartment building located at 320 East Grand Boulevard in Detroit, Michigan, in the East Grand Boulevard Historic District. It was listed on the National Register of Historic Places in 1991.

== Architecture ==
Often attributed to the firm of Wiedmaier & Gay, the December 6, 1928, edition of the Detroit Free Press lists Robert J. West as the architect of the building. The El Tovar Apartment building is an excellent example of Spanish Moorish/Art Deco style. El Tovar Apartments is a four-and-a-half-story building, containing 73 apartments, constructed from orange brick with limestone trim, orange terra cotta accents, and a Spanish tile roof. The entrance is within the center pavilion, reached by a sidewalk flanked by carved lion figures. The name El Tovar is carved on a scroll above the entrance. Minaret-like towers project from the gabled roof, and there are arched openings at the corners of the front façade, chimney stack-like projections, pseudo-flying buttresses, and stylized crenellations.

== Significance ==
Built in 1928, the apartment building represents a significant change in Detroit from low density to higher density housing. In 1988, the Messiah Housing Corporation purchased the building; they rehabilitated the apartments and opened them for Section 8 housing in 1992. Messiah Housing also owns the nearby Saint Paul Manor Apartments and Kingston Arms Apartments.
