= Boys' Club Building =

- U.S. National Register of Historic Places
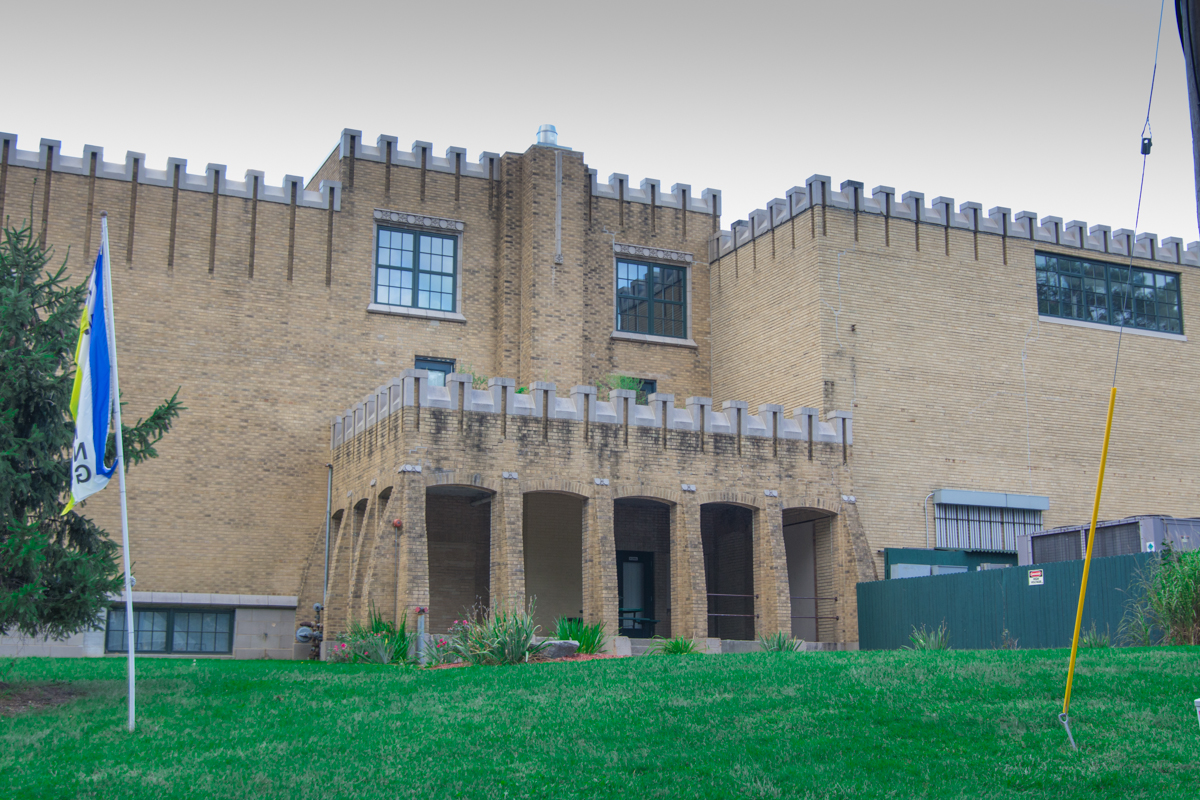
- Interactive map
- Location: 115 West St., Battle Creek, Michigan
- Coordinates: 42°19′35″N 85°10′58″W
- Area: 2.4 acres (0.97 ha)
- Built: 1928
- Architect: Benjamin & Benjamin
- Architectural style: Art Deco, Late 19th And 20th Century Revivals
- NRHP reference No.: 04000457
- Added to NRHP: May 19, 2004

The Boys' Club Building, also known as the Youth Building, is a recreational structure located at 115 West Street in Battle Creek, Michigan. It was listed on the National Register of Historic Places in 2004.

== History ==
In 1926, W.K. Kellogg anonymously donated $150,000 to the city of Battle Creek to construct and purchase equipment for a clubhouse for boys located in Irving Park. The city enlisted the help of two local foundations to oversee the project: the Fellowship Corporation (now the W.K. Kellogg Foundation) and the Battle Creek Foundation. The Grand Rapids building and architectural firm of Benjamin & Benjamin was chosen to design the building. In 1928, the management of the building was turned over to the Boy Scouts of Battle Creek, and W.K. Kellogg was publicly acknowledged as the donor. Operation of the building was transferred to the city's Civic Recreation Association in 1937, and the building's name was changed to the W.K. Kellogg Youth Building. The city opened the building to the general public. After many years of civic use, the W.K. Kellogg Foundation transferred ownership of the building to the city in 1950. The city used the building until 1988, when it was decided that the required repairs and maintenance were too expensive to justify further investment. The building remained vacant until 2003, when it was renovated for residential use. The new community was named "The Village at Irving Park."

== Description ==
The Boys' Club Building is a flat-roofed, two-story Art Deco recreation facility, with walls constructed from buff-color brick and trimmed with gray terra cotta. The building covers roughly 15,000 square feet. It sits on a stone-faced masonry foundation, high enough to have a basement level. The main elevation is symmetrical, nine bays wide, with three-bay side wings. The building's main central entrance is elevated, and is approached by a wide stair. The entrance is through an arched opening with terra cotta surround.
