= B and C Grocery Building =

- U.S. National Register of Historic Places
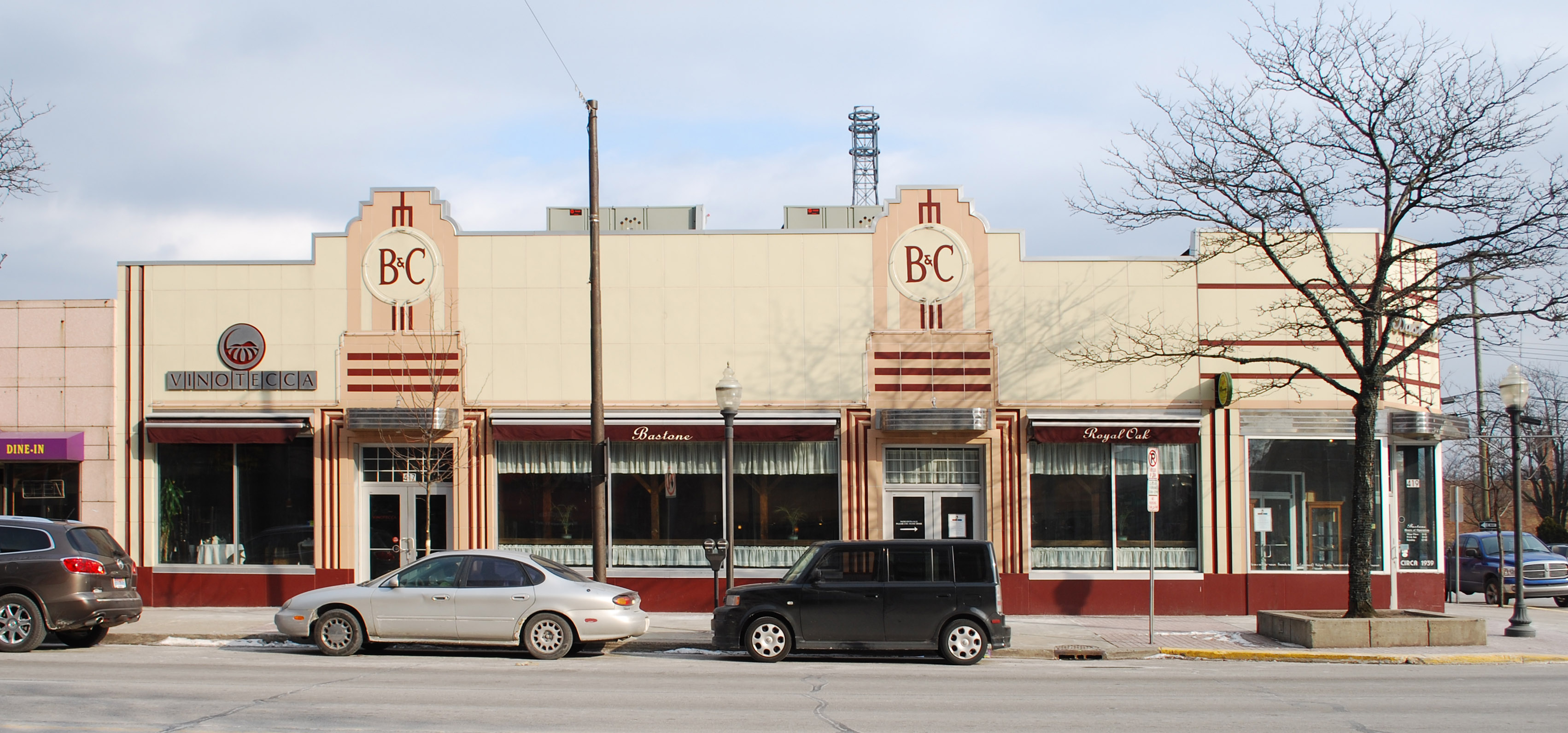

- Location within Michigan Location within the United States
- Interactive map
- Location: 417-19 S. Main St., Royal Oak, Michigan
- Coordinates: 42°29′9″N 83°8′39″W
- Area: less than one acre
- Built: 1939
- Architect: Henry Kohner, Inc.
- Architectural style: Art Deco, Moderne
- NRHP reference No.: 06000149
- Added to NRHP: March 22, 2006

The B and C Grocery Building is a commercial building located at 417-19 South Main Street in Royal Oak, Michigan. It was listed on the National Register of Historic Places in 2006.

== History ==
Joseph Chodoroff, Peter Chodoroff, and Max Bachman established the Bachman & Chodoroff grocery on Oakland Avenue in Detroit in the early 1920s. By 1930, the store had developed into a chain, with two stores in Detroit and two in Royal Oak. In 1939, B & C hired the Detroit firm of Henry Kohner, Inc to design this building. Construction began in 1939, and was finished in 1940. By 1950, two other stores opened in Berkley and Clawson, and by 1954 the two Detroit stores were closed. Daisy Warren Roberts (1916-2012), a Royal Oak resident, began working as a clerk at the B & C in the early 1930s. The owners paid her tuition for accounting school and she became the bookkeeper for the company and remained in that position through the mid-1950s. When the building was purchased and remodeled into a restaurant in the early 2000s, the owner contacted Daisy and invited her to give a short speech at the grand opening, to which she happily obliged.

The B & C Grocery closed in the 1960s, after which the building housed offices, a cardio-pulmonary clinic, and a sporting goods store. In about 1970, the Art Moderne panels were hidden behind a new facade. The building was purchased in 2003 by 2mission, who rehabilitated the building. completing it in 2006. Five new tenants were placed in the building, including a restaurant and wine bar.

== Description ==
The B & C Grocery Building is a one-story red brick commercial building with a broad and low Art Deco front, faced in Macotta porcelain enamel metal panels, colored pail yellow with salmon and burgundy accents. Shiny metal doors and windows create a band across the building. Low stepped "gables" are placed above the two double-door entries; a third entry is angled on the corner of the building. The B & C Grocery was the first supermarket to ever have a soda fountain and the first privately owned chain of supermarkets in the U.S. in the 1940s.

== See also ==
- National Register of Historic Places listings in Oakland County, Michigan
