= McKinley Elementary School (Wyandotte, Michigan) =

- U.S. National Register of Historic Places
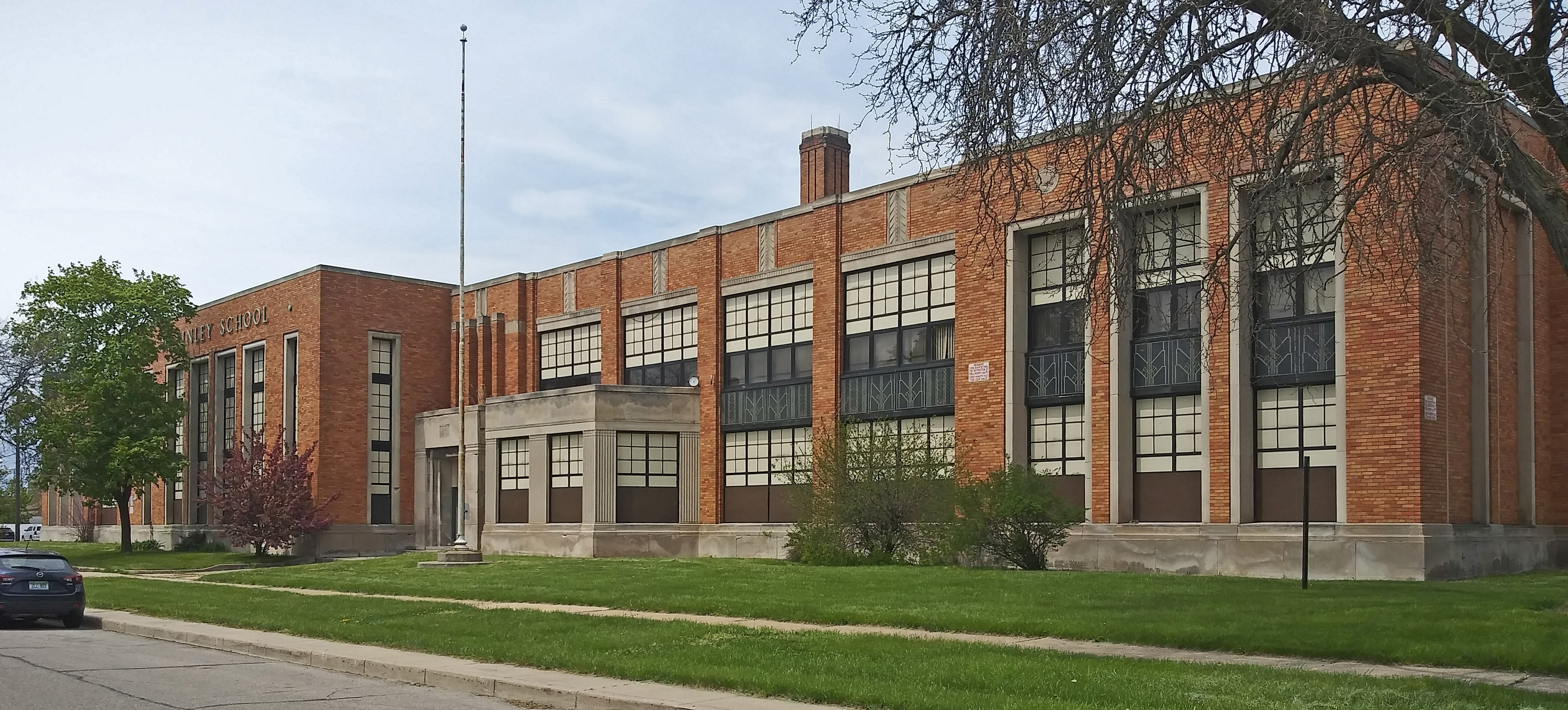
- McKinley Elementary School Wyandotte.jpg

- Location within Michigan Location within the United States
- Interactive map
- Location: 640 Plum St. Wyandotte, Michigan
- Coordinates: 42°11′46″N 83°9′31″W
- Area: less than one acre
- Built: 1940
- Built by: O.W. Burke Company
- Architect: Carl R. Jensen, Gwen Frostic
- Architectural style: Art deco
- NRHP reference No.: 100001840
- Added to NRHP: November 27, 2017

McKinley Elementary School is a former school building located at 640 Plum Street in Wyandotte, Michigan. It was listed on the National Register of Historic Places in 2017.

== History ==
The first school building in what is now Wyandotte was constructed in 1837. A new school as constructed in 1856, and a Central Union high school was built in 1869. The first school on the site of the present McKinley Elementary School was constructed in 1872, and was known as the Third Ward school. This school was demolished in 1901, and replaced with a new building designed by Malcomson and Higginbotham, and named McKinley Elementary School. By 1937, this was the oldest elementary school in the district, and the school board began considering replacing it. After exploring funding sources, the board finally approved construction of a new building in late 1938.

The school district hired architect Carl R. Jensen of Detroit to design the building, and the O.W. Burke Company to construct it. The school opened in March 1940. The school continued in use until 2009, when declining enrollment led the school board to close it. As of 2017, the building is being rehabilitated for housing. Coachlight Properties LLC and Jonesboro Investment Corp. will redevelop the building into 60 market-rate senior apartments.

== Description ==
McKinley Elementary School is a two-story Art deco-style building faced with multi-tone orange brick. the front facade has a raised foundation clad with limestone. It is divided into three main sections: an auditorium in the center and the east and west wings. The central auditorium section is six bays wide, and projects forward from the wings. Six limestone-framed openings in the central section extend two stories above the foundation. Each side wing is eight bays wide, and has a one-story-tall projecting limestone porch entrance abutting the auditorium. The porches shelter a recessed entrance. Above each entrance are three narrow window openings separated by square brick piers topped with limestone. The next four bays of the wings are separated by brick piers and have a set of four windows at the first and second floors. Each bay has a limestone cornice running across the top. The three end bays project slightly, and contain two-story openings framed with limestone, containing windows.

The interior of the building has corridors with terrazzo floors and glazed tile wainscoting with plaster walls above. Inset in the floors on the first story are four medallions designed by Fred Frostic, superintendent of Wyandotte Public Schools at the time the school was built, and his daughter Gwen Frostic. The staircases to the upper floor are metal with terrazzo treads and metal balustrades. Classrooms generally have vinyl tile floors, plaster walls with wood trim, and bulletin and marker boards framed with wood. The kindergarten room has a fireplace surrounded with decorative tile featuring nursery rhyme characters and animals. The school also has an auditorium and gymnasium.
