= Michigan Bell and Western Electric Warehouse =

- U.S. National Register of Historic Places
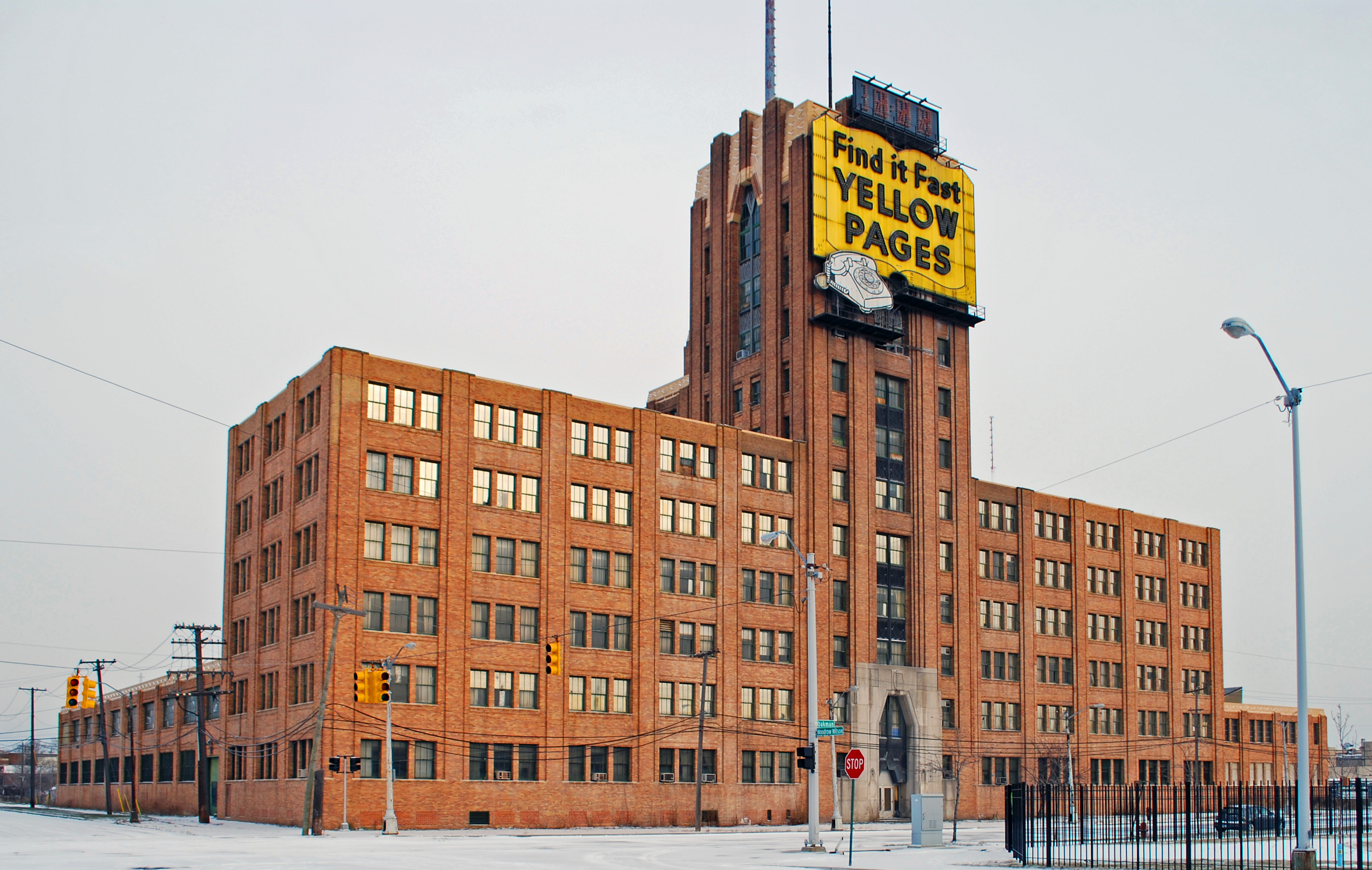

- Location within Michigan Location within the United States
- Interactive map
- Location: 882 Oakman Blvd. Detroit, Michigan
- Coordinates: 42°24′10″N 83°6′51″W
- Area: 3.4 acres (1.4 ha)
- Built: 1929
- Architect: Smith, Hinchman & Grylis; Bryant & Detwiler
- Architectural style: Art Deco
- NRHP reference No.: 09001069
- Added to NRHP: December 8, 2009

The Michigan Bell and Western Electric Warehouse is a former commercial warehouse building located at 882 Oakman Boulevard (also numbered as 14300 Woodrow Wilson) in Detroit, Michigan. It was listed on the National Register of Historic Places in 2009. It is now known as the NSO Bell Building.

== History ==
In the late 1920s, Western Electric and Michigan Bell shared a building on Detroit's east side, where Western Electric stored and distributed equipment, and Michigan Bell housed and serviced their vehicles. That building proved too small, so in 1929–30, the two companies built this structure to serve as a warehouse, garage, and office space for both. Michigan Bell used the west side of the first floor as a garage, and the third and sixth floors as maintenance operations and office space, respectively. Western Electric used a rail spur on the north and east side of the building for shipping, the second floor for storage, and the remainder of the building for offices and operations.

Western Electric used the building as its Michigan headquarters until 1958, when they moved to a larger facility in Plymouth, Michigan. The next year, the Yellow Pages operation moved into the building. In 1961, a large "Yellow Pages" sign was installed across the front of the building. Michigan Bell sold the building in 1995, although the company continued to use it until 1999.

For some years until the mid-1980s, the building was notable for its "Weather-Phone" sign, under the Yellow Pages logo. This translucent white plastic sign, modeled after the Western Electric model 500 desk telephone, was backlit with lights of different colors, providing a basic weather forecast to motorists on the Lodge Freeway at night. A red telephone meant warmer weather was forecast in the next 24 hours, blue meant cooler, and yellow, no change in temperature. The lighting would blink when precipitation was expected, whereas a steady light meant neither rain nor snow was expected. During the redevelopment of the building in 2009, the sign was deemed structurally unsound and removed. It was offered to museums, but due to its sheer size (it was nearly five stories tall) none were able to take it.

A mixed-use renovation was planned for the structure in 2009, combining the administrative offices and services of the Neighborhood Service Organization with permanent supportive housing for the formerly homeless. Total investment is approximately $50,000,000.

As of July 2013, the redevelopment is nearing completion, with only the NSO headquarters to be finished. Residents already occupy the building, which contains such amenities as a gym, library, computer room, recreation room, supportive services office, and workout room.

== Description ==
The Michigan Bell and Western Electric Warehouse consists of a number of rectangular masses laid out in an irregular footprint. The main section, running along Oakman, is six stories tall, with a central tower that rises to 12 stories. The tower is three bays wide, and the flanking sections of the building are five bays each. Each bay is separated with brick piers, and contains a grouping of three double-hung four-over-four windows with limestone sills. The entrance in the central tower is through a pair of double doors with sidelights and a transom. The doors are located within a 2 1/2-story arched opening, with the surround faced in limestone with Art Deco relief in the keystone.

A five-story wing, six bays by seven bays, extends behind the main section. The bays are again separated by brick piers and contain multi-paned, steel industrial-type windows. A two-story warehouse, five bays wide by ten bays deep, runs along the east side of the building. A two-story garage, six bays wide and ten bays deep, runs along the west side. Another single story garage is on the north side.

The interior of the structure was originally primarily industrial. However, the entrance vestibule and first floor hallway have a marble stairway with marble faced walls and a vaulted ceiling. The garages and warehouse are open spaces with concrete floors and walls and exposed ceiling trusses. The remainder of the main building is painted brick and concrete block walls and concrete floors. Currently, areas that were built as open warehouse spaces have been subdivided into office areas. There is a third floor kitchen with glazed block walls and tile floors. The eleventh and twelfth floors of the tower are a single open space containing two large water tanks.

== See also ==
- Planning and development in Detroit
- National Register of Historic Places listings in Detroit
