= Manchester Apartments =

Manchester Apartments may refer to:

- Manchester Apartments (Indianapolis, Indiana), listed on the NRHP in Indiana
- Manchester Apartments (Detroit), listed on the NRHP in Michigan
