= Sheffield Inn =

- U.S. National Register of Historic Places
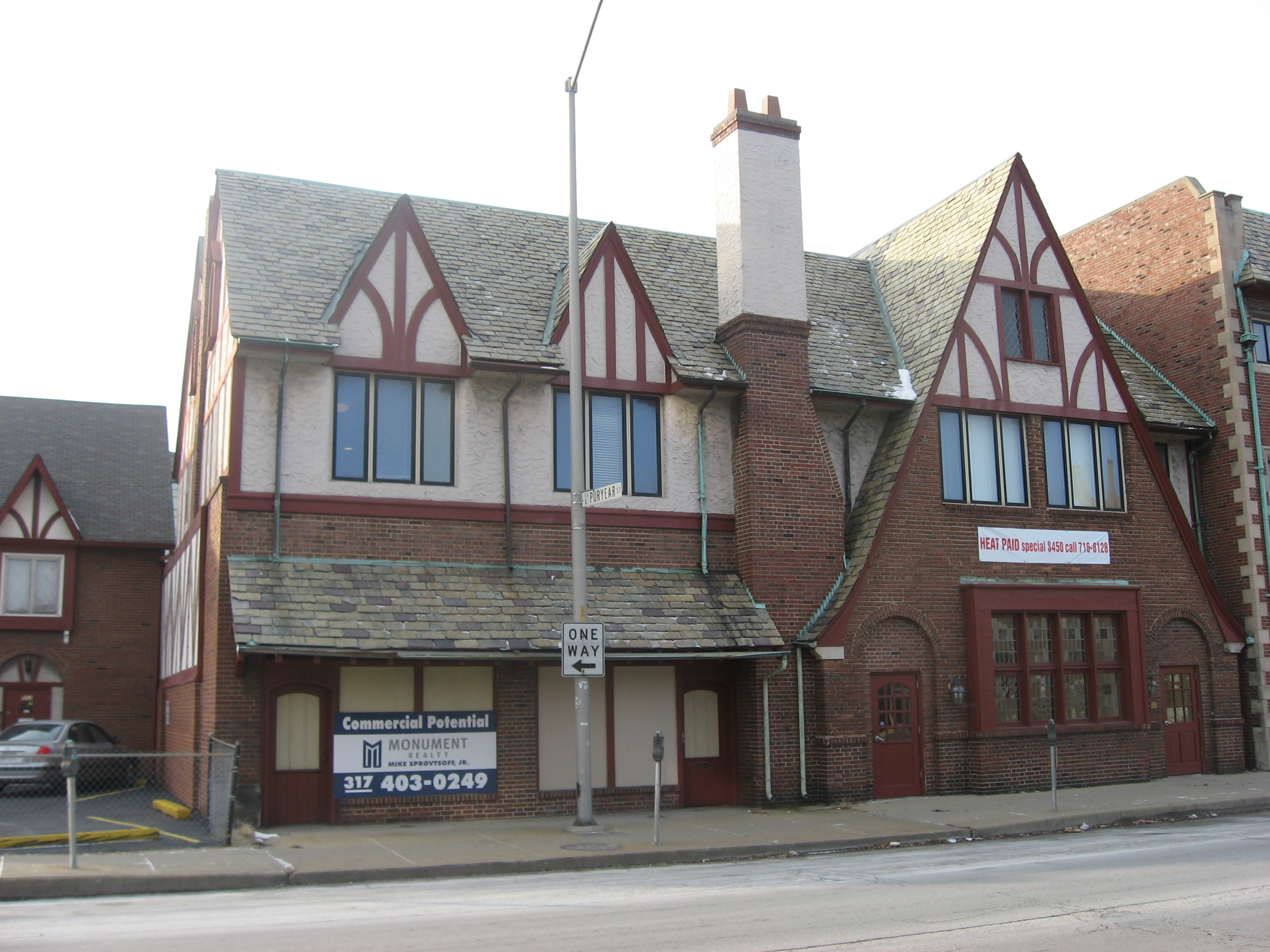
- Sheffield Inn, January 2010

- Location within Indianapolis Location within Indiana Location within the United States
- Location: 956-58 N Pennsylvania St., Indianapolis, Indiana
- Coordinates: 39°46′50″N 86°9′21″W
- Area: less than one acre
- Built: 1927
- Architect: Fitton, Harry R.
- Architectural style: Tudor Revival
- NRHP reference No.: 98000301
- Added to NRHP: April 1, 1998

Sheffield Inn, also known as the Sheffield Apartments, is a historic apartment building located at Indianapolis, Indiana. It was built in 1927, and is a two-story, I-shaped Tudor Revival style masonry building. It features a multi-gabled slate roof with 2 1/2-story projecting gabled pavilion, decorative chimney, banks of leaded glass windows, and decorative half-timbering. The building was originally designed as a residential hotel and remodeled in 1971. It is located immediately next to the Manchester Apartments.

It was listed on the National Register of Historic Places in 1998.

== See also ==
- National Register of Historic Places listings in Center Township, Marion County, Indiana
