= Manchester Apartments (Indianapolis, Indiana) =

- U.S. National Register of Historic Places
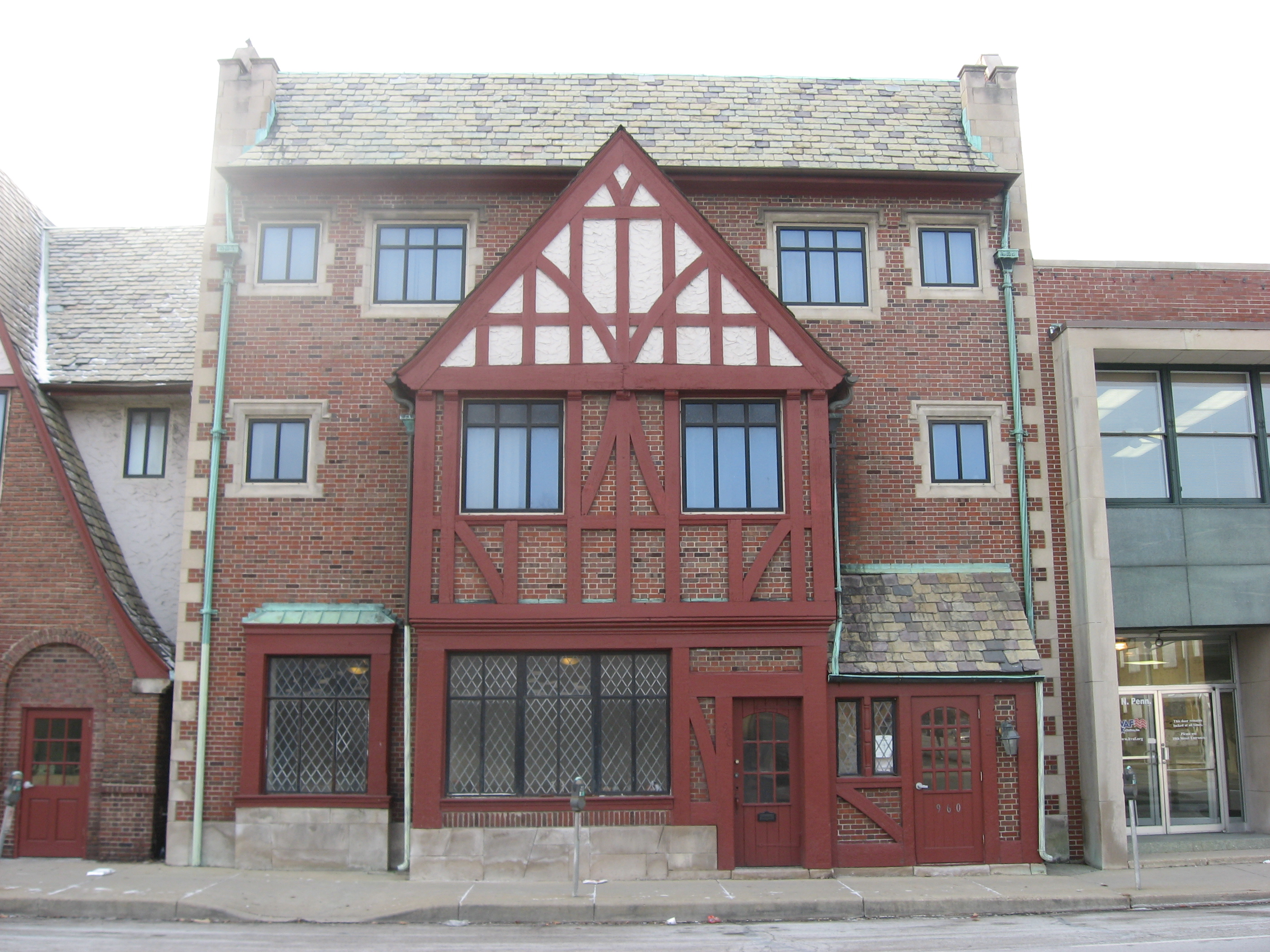
- Manchester Apartments, January 2010

- Location within Indianapolis Location within Indiana Location within the United States
- Location: 960-962 N. Pennsylvania St., Indianapolis, Indiana
- Coordinates: 39°46′47″N 86°9′22″W
- Area: less than one acrea
- Built: 1929
- Architect: Fitton, Harry R.
- Architectural style: Tudor Revival
- NRHP reference No.: 98000302
- Added to NRHP: April 1, 1998

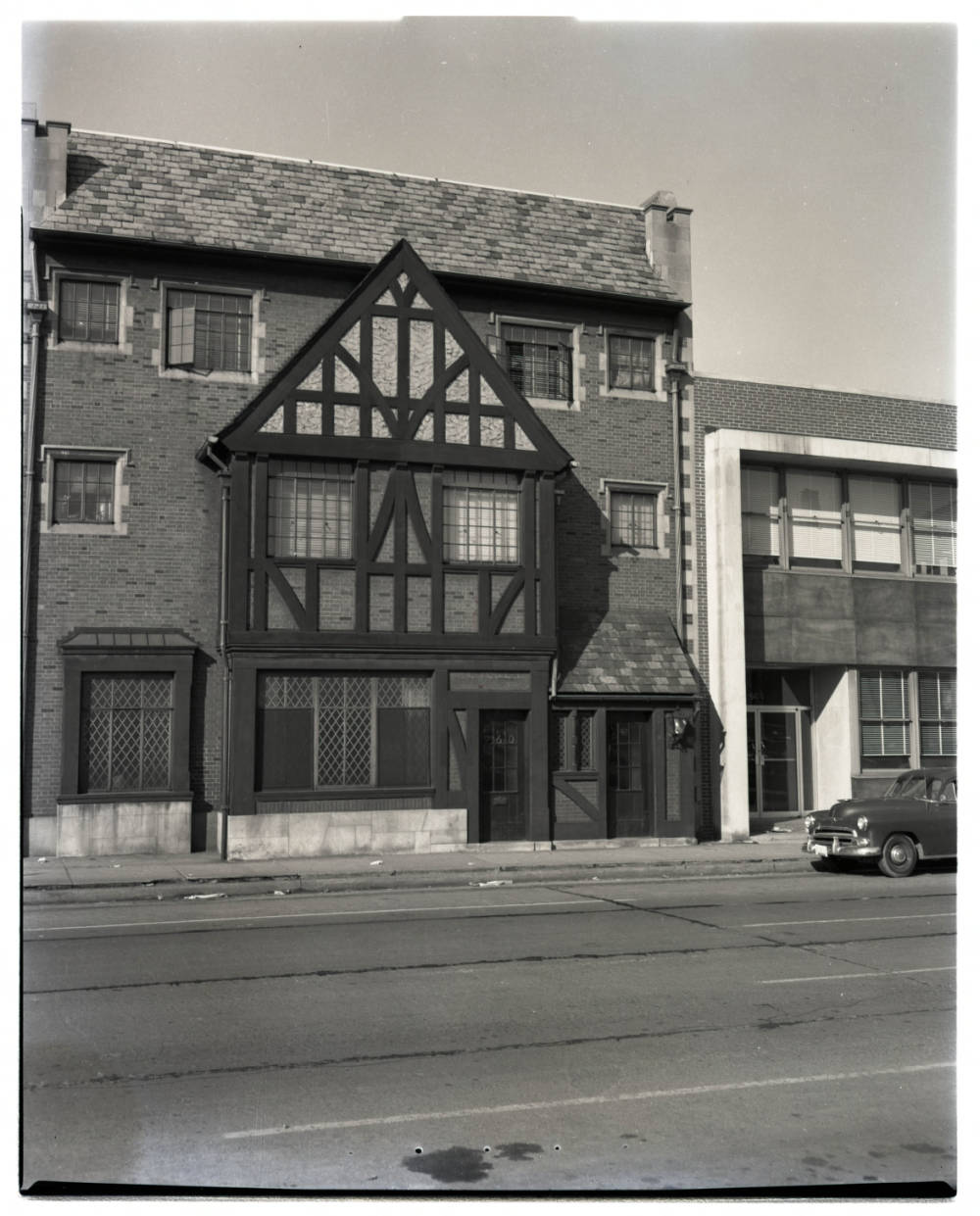
Manchester Apartments 1940s

Manchester Apartments is a historic apartment building in Indianapolis, Indiana. It was built in 1929, and is a three-story, Tudor Revival style brick building. It measures 40 feet wide and 210 feet long and features a gable front pavilion with stucco and decorative half-timbering. The building was remodeled in 1971. It is next to the Sheffield Inn.

It was listed on the National Register of Historic Places in 1998.

== See also ==
- National Register of Historic Places listings in Center Township, Marion County, Indiana
