= Manchester Apartments (Detroit) =

- U.S. National Register of Historic Places
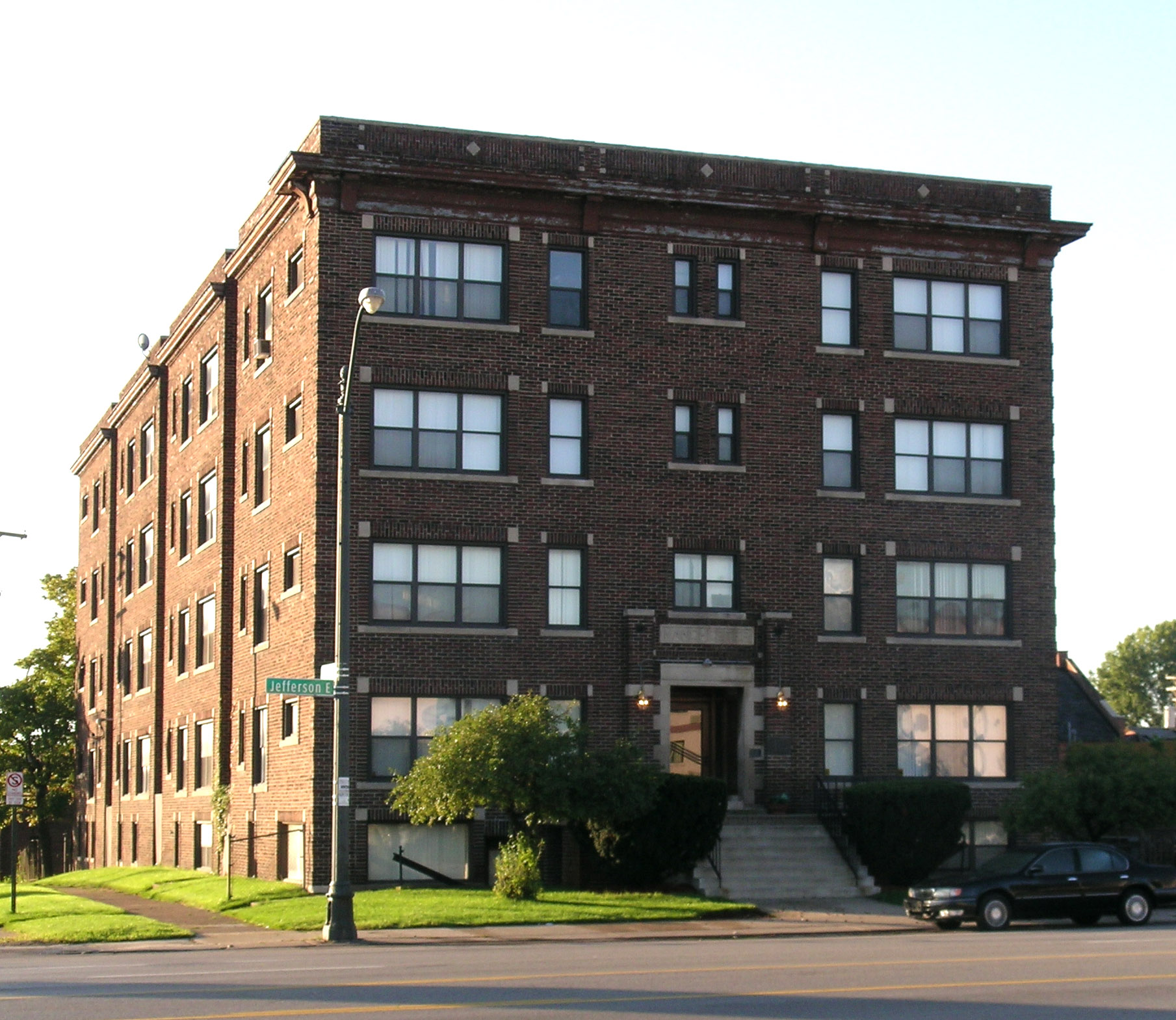
- Interactive map
- Location: 2016 East Jefferson Avenue; Detroit, Michigan
- Coordinates: 42°20′10″N 83°1′37″W
- Built: 1915
- MPS: East Jefferson Avenue Residential TR
- NRHP reference No.: 85002941
- Added to NRHP: October 9, 1985

The Manchester Apartments is an apartment building located at 2016 East Jefferson Avenue in Detroit, Michigan. It was listed on the National Register of Historic Places in 1985.

== Description ==
The Manchester Apartments is a four-story apartment building constructed from brick. The front entrance is flanked by pilasters, and surmounted by a stone panel with the name "Manchester." The details of the exterior, including corner blocks around window groupings, brick quoins, and patterns above the cornice, demonstrate the rise of modernism. The building contains one- and two-bedroom apartments.

== History ==
Manchester Apartments was constructed in 1915. The building is typical of medium-scale middle-class apartment buildings built in Detroit in general and along East Jefferson in particular in the first decade of the 20th century. The building continues to house apartments into 2020.

== In popular culture ==
The Manchester Apartments were featured in the season one episode of The Sopranos, The Legend of Tennessee Moltisanti, where it serves as the apartment building of Christopher Moltisanti and Adriana La Cerva.
