= Beard Elementary School =

Beard Elementary School may refer to:

- Beard Elementary School - Helotes, Texas - Northside Independent School District
- Beard Elementary School (James A. Garfield School) - Detroit - Detroit Public Schools
