= Malcomson and Higginbotham =

Malcomson and Higginbotham was an architectural firm started in the nineteenth century and based in Detroit, Michigan. A successor firm, Malcomson-Greimel and Associates, still exists in Rochester, Michigan as of 2010.

== History ==
Architects William G. Malcomson and William E. Higginbotham formed a partnership in 1890.

The firm was retained by the Detroit Board of Education in 1895, and between 1895 and 1923 had designed over 75% of the school buildings in Detroit. The firm remained in business under various names until the present.

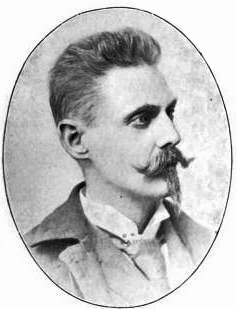
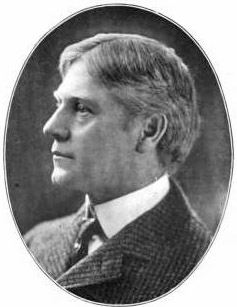
William G. Malcomson (left) and William E. Higginbotham

== William G. Malcomson ==
William George Malcomson was born in 1856 in Hamilton, Ontario. He began his architectural career early, and in 1875 supervised the construction of the Henry Langley-designed Erie Street United Church in Ridgetown, Ontario. In 1882, Malcomson married Jennie E. McKinlay of Ridgetown, Ontario; the couple had five children. William G. Malcomson died in 1937.

== William E. Higginbotham ==
William E. Higginbotham was born in 1858 in Detroit. He was educated in the Detroit public schools, and at the age of 19 joined the architectural form of J. V. Smith. He married Nettie M. Morphy in 1892; the couple had two children: a daughter, Doris Higginbotham (born 26 February 1893, Detroit; died 3 July 1983, Lafayette, LA) and a son, Bruce Field Higginbotham (born 1895, Detroit; died 1939, Atlanta, GA). William E. Higginbotham died in 1923.

== Other principals and architects ==
- Malcomson and Higginbotham began as a partnership between William G. Malcomson and William E. Higginbotham.
- Around 1907, the firm changed its name to "Malcomson, Higginbotham and Clement" with the addition of Hugh B. Clement as a partner. Clement soon left, and the name reverted to "Malcomson and Higginbotham".
- Wirt C. Rowland joined the firm, though not as a partner, in 1912 and stayed until 1915 when he rejoined Albert Kahn.
- C. William Palmer became a partner in 1920 and the firm became known as "Malcomson, Higginbotham and Palmer", reverting again to "Malcomson and Higginbotham" upon Palmer's departure in 1924, despite Higginbotham's death in 1922.
- In 1925, Alexander L. Trout became a partner, and the firm once more changed its name to "Malcomson and Higginbotham and Trout" until 1935, when Trout left.
- The firm finally dropped Higginbotham's name after Malcomson's death in 1937 with the addition of Ralph R. Calder, and Maurice E. Hammond, becoming "Malcomson, Calder, and Hammond"; they remained under that name until 1945, when Ralph R. Calder resigned to establish his eponymous firm, which remains in business.
- In 1945, Homer A. Fowler became a partner, and the firm name was changed to "Malcomson, Fowler, and Hammond". until 1958 at least.
- In the 1960s, the firm merged with that of Karl H. Greimel to become "Greimel, Malcomson and Hammond". Karl Greimel was the dean of Lawrence Technological University's School of Architecture from 1974 - 1991.
- The firm was later known as "Greimel, Malcomson, and James".
- The firm changed its name to "Malcomson-Greimel and Associates", and still exists as of 2018.

== List of structures designed by Malcomson and Higginbotham ==
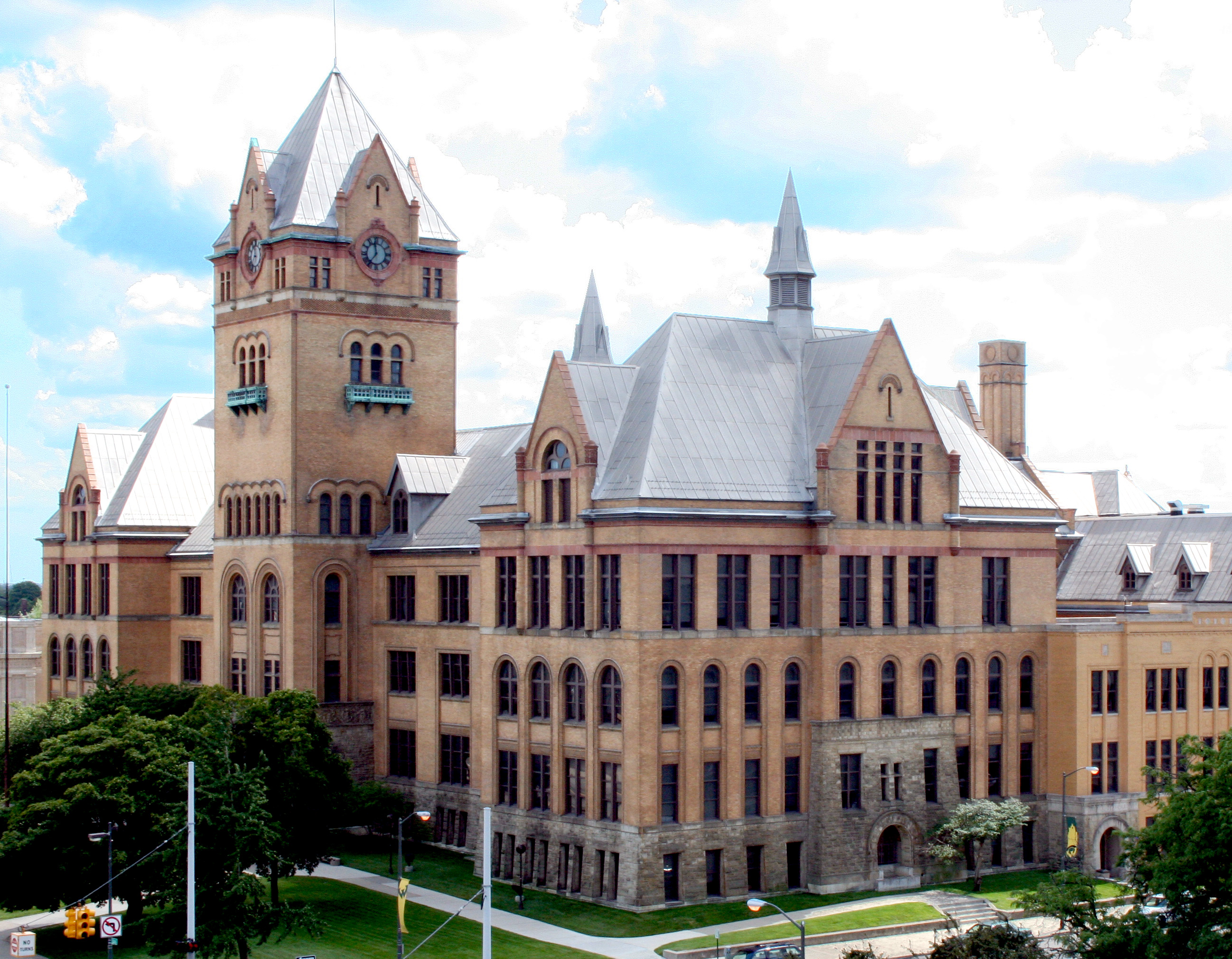
Old Main, Wayne State University, 1895

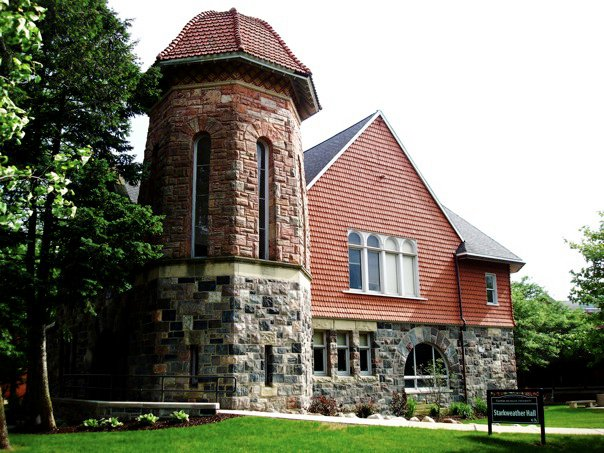
Starkweather Hall, Eastern Michigan University, 1896

All buildings are located in Detroit, unless otherwise indicated.

- The Liggett School (1883) 155-165 Stimson Avenue. Demolished in 1960s
- Thomas G. Craig Residence (1884) 461 West Alexandrine.
- Parker Building (1886) 1437 Woodward Avenue.
- Young Women's Association Home (1888) 164 West Adams. Demolished in 1960s
- 1317 Abbott (1888) Demolished in 1960s
- Hook and Ladder House No. 5-Detroit Fire Department Repair Shop, (1888) 3400 Russell.
- Frederick Besancon Residence (1889) 1011 Howard. Demolished in 1950s
- 74 Charlotte (1890)
- Thomas J. D. Sealy Residence (1890) 1432 Leverette.
- 1842 Michigan Avenue (1891)
- Central Christian Church (1891) northeast corner of Ledyard & Second Avenue. Demolished in 1966.
- William A. Pungs Residence (1891) 60 East Ferry Avenue.
- Agnes Inglis Residence (1891) 102 Garfield.
- Terrace (1892) 3113 Woodward Avenue. Demolished in 1980s
- Berry School (1892) 2911 Concord. Demolished.
- Hancock School (1892) 2150 West Hancock. Demolished.
- Columbian Elementary School (1892) 5130 McKinley. Demolished.
- Cass Avenue Methodist Episcopal Church, (1892) (addition) 3901 Cass Avenue.
- First Congregational Church (1892) 327 North Washington Street, Owosso, MI.
- Van Dyke Elementary School (1893) 2101 Van Dyke. Demolished.
- Charles Wardell Residence (1893) 3677 Lincoln.
- Field School (1894) 1413 Field. Demolished.
- Verona Apartments, (1894) 92 West Ferry.
- 1932 Eleventh (1894)
- T. Wilson Dickinson Residence (1894) 81 Marston. Demolished in 2014.
- 99 Marston (1894). Demolished.
- Campbell School (1895) 2117 East Alexandrine. Demolished.
- Estabrook School (1895) 6016 Linwood. Demolished.
- Preston School (1895) 1251 Seventeenth. Demolished.
- Ferdinand Amos Elementary School (1895) 1310 Military. Demolished.
- David Mackenzie house (1895) Moved from 4735 Cass Avenue to 490 West Forest in 2020.
- Old Main (Wayne State University), 1895 4869 Cass Avenue.
- General Orlando M. Poe Elementary School (1896) 1235 Lysander. Demolished.
- James McMillan School (1896) 615 West End Avenue. Demolished in 1999.
- George P. MacNichol House, Wyandotte, Michigan, 1896
- James A. Garfield School, 1896
- Starkweather Hall (Eastern Michigan University), Ypsilanti, Michigan, (1896)
- Our Lady of the Rosary Church, (1896) 5930 Woodward Avenue.
- Scovel Memorial Presbyterian Church (1896) 5785 Grand River Avenue. Demolished in 2005.
- George P. MacNichol Residence (1896) 2610 Biddle Wyandotte, MI.
- Harris Elementary School (1896) 3700 Pulford. Demolished.
- 469 Ledyard (1897) Demolished.
- Ford-Bacon House, Wyandotte, Michigan, (1897) 45 Vinewood.
- Detroit Light Guard Amory (1898) 329 East Larned. Demolished in 1945.
- Engine #24 Detroit Fire Department (1898) 111 Kenilworth.
- Western High School (1898) 1500 Scotten. Demolished in 1935.
- M. M. Rose Elementary School (1898) 5505 Van Dyke.
- Garfield School (1899) 1315 Frederick. Demolished.
- Alger School (1899) 311 Kenilworth, Demolished in 1991.
- Tilden Elementary School (1899) 1314 West Kirby, Demolished in 1960s.
- Daniel J. Campau School (1899) 2921 East Forest, Demolished.
- Benjamin Franklin Elementary School (1899) 2525 Brooklyn, Demolished.
- Engine #26 (1900) 2200 Crane.
- Gillies Elementary School (1900) 926 Junction, Demolished in 1960s.
- 1400 Howard (1900). Demolished.
- Eastern High School (1901) 770 East Grand Boulevard, Demolished in 1982.
- Bellevue School (1901) 1150 Bellvue, Demolished.
- Hervey C. Parke Elementary School (1901) 3010 East Milwaukee, Demolished in 1980s.
- Addition In John Owen Elementary School, (1901) 2020 Martin Luther King Boulevard, Demolished.
- Craft Elementary School (1901) 3310 Vinewood, Demolished.
- Thomas McGraw Elementary School (1901) 3400 Wreford, Demolished.
- Engine Company #9 Detroit Fire Department (1901) 1485-1489 East Larned, Demolished in 1965.
- William C. Maybury Residence, (1901) 322 West Grand Boulevard.
- Hartz Building (1902) 1529 Broadway.
- Hugh Cary Elementary School (1902) 6501 South Street, Demolished.
- Janes W. Price Residence (1902) 555 East Ferry, Demolished.
- Arthur M. Parker House, (1902) 8115 East Jefferson Avenue.
- Commercial Building in 6454 Russell (1903) Demolished in 2017.
- Imperial Wheel Company, (1903) 1051 East Hamilton, Flint, MI.
- Morley School (1903) 1120 South Beaumont, Demolished.
- Mrs. Mary Ferguson Residence (1903) 4234 Avery.
- Ellen E. Capron Elementary School (1904) 1471 Maple, Demolished in 1960s.
- McKinstry Elementary School (1905) 1981 McKinstry.
- J. M. B. Sill School (1905) 5000 Thirtieth, Demolished.
- Church of Christ (1905) 6868 Wakefield Road, Hiram, OH.
- Aerocar Company Factory (1906) 6501 Mack Avenue.
- John S. Gray Branch Detroit Public Library (1906) 1117 Field.
- John Monteith Elementary School (1906) 1095 Hibbard.
- Emma A. Thomas School (1906) 6821 East Ferry, Demolished in 2013.
- Detroit University School (1906) 504-538 Elmwood Avenue, Demolished in 1960s.
- Ann Arbor High School (1906) located at the southeast corner of East Huron Street and South State, Ann Arbor, MI. Demolished in 2007.
- John Whittaker Residence (1906) 3900 Commonwealth.
- Malcomson Building (1907) 1215 Griswold.
- Peoples State Bank Branch (1907) 5517 Michigan Avenue.
- Chandler Elementary School (1907) 9227 Chapin.
- Ernest E. Sweet Residence (1907) 551 Chandler.
- Edward M. Murphy Residence (1907) 206 Auburn Avenue, Pontiac, MI.
- Fanny E. Wingert Elementary School (1908) 1851 West Grand Boulevard.
- Duane Doty Elementary School (1908) 10225 Third Avenue.
- W. A. Moore School (1908) 1000 Alger, Demolished.
- Henry Ford Residence (1908) 140 Edison.
- Herbert J. Conn Residence (1908) 1417 Seminole.
- Bert Lambert Residence (1908) 130 Virginia Park.
- John E. Lambert Residence (1908) 160 Virginia Park.
- William C. Maybury Elementary School (1909) 4410 Porter.
- Greusel Elementary School (1909) 5924 Moran, Demolished
- Donald Miller Residence (1909) 296 Eliot.
- Regal Motor Car Company Factory (1909) 561 Piquette, Demolished in 1930s.
- Douglass Houghton School (1910) 1330 Abbott, Demolished in 1963.
- Clippert School (1910) 4725 Martin, Demolished in 1990s
- John F. Nichols Elementary School (1910) 3000 Burns.
- Herbert J. Conn Residence (1911) 1411 Burns.
- Frederick E. Zumstein Residence (1911) 5105 Second Avenue, Demolished in 1960s.
- Charles R. Lambert Residence (1911) 611 West Boston Boulevard.
- Northwestern High School (1912) 6300 Grand River Avenue, Demolished in 1980s.
- Theodore D. Buhl Memorial Addition of Harper Hospital (1912) 3800 John R, Demolished in 1977.
- High School of Commerce (1912) 2330 Grand River Avenue, Demolished in 1964.
- Clarence M. Burton School (1912) 3420 Cass Avenue.
- Carolyn Crossman Elementary School (1912) 9027 John C. Lodge Freeway.
- John F. Bennett Elementary School (1912) 2111 Mullane.
- William T. Sampson Elementary School (1912) 6075 Begole.
- Samuel Barstow Elementary School (1913) 1464 East Congress, Demolished in 1960s.
- Albert L. Stephens Elementary School (1913) 5974 Seneca.
- C. E. Forgeson Terrace (1913) northeast corner of Commonwealth and West Alexandrine.
- Charles J. George Elementary/Trade School (1914) 4110 Russell, Demolished.
- William Hilger Elementary School (1914) 8411 East Forest.
- Anna M. Joyce Intermediate School (1914) 8411 Sylvester.
- Isabel F. Thirkell School (1914) 7724 Fourteenth Street.
- Herbert J. Conn Residence (1914) 1490 Iroquois.
- Northeastern High School (1914) 4830-4872 Grandy, Demolished in 1999.
- Hely Elementary School (1915) 7630 Harper, Demolished.
- Joseph A. Majeske Elementary School (1915) 2139 Trombly, Demolished.
- John Nordstrum High School (1915) 6921 West Fort Street, Demolished.
- Hattie M. Carstens Elementary School (1915) 2592 Coplin.
- Northern High School (1916) 9026 Woodward Avenue.
- Breitmeyer Elementary School (1916) 8210 Cameron, Demolished.
- Frank C. Neinas Elementary School (1916) 6021 McMillan.
- Lucien Ellis Elementary School (1916) 5611 Rich, Demolished.
- James B. Angell Elementary School (1916) 8323 Holmur, Demolished.
- Church of Christ (1916) 252 Tuxedo, Highland Park, MI.
- Southeastern High School (1916) 3030 Fairview.
- Lingemann Elementary School (1917) 567 Montclair, Demolished.
- McMichael Junior High School (1917) 6230 Grand River Avenue, Demolished.
- Theodore Harms Elementary School (1917) 2400 Central.
- Peoples State Bank Branch (1917) 3401 Hastings, Demolished.
- Nellie Leland School (1917) 1395 Antietam.
- Frederick A. Hanstein School (1917) 4290 Marseilles, Grosse Pointe Township Schools, Demolished in 2015.
- 1211-1213 Griswold (1917)
- Sidney D. Miller Intermediate School (1917) 2322 DuBois.
- George Armstrong Custer Elementary School (1920) 15531 Linwood.
- Katherine B. White Elementary School (1920) 5161 Charles Street.
- Pattengill Elementary School (1920) 8411 Northfield, Demolished.
- Harry B. Hutchins Elementary School (1921) 8820 Woodrow Wilson.
- Levi Barbour Junior High School (1921) 4209 Seneca.
- George Washington Balch Intermediate School, (1921) 5536 St. Antoine.
- George Newton Brady Elementary School (1921) 2920 Joy Road.
- Edison Elementary School (1921) 17045 Grandmont.
- Cass Technical High School (1922) 2421 Second Avenue, Demolished in 2011.
- Southwestern High School (1922) 6921 West Fort Street.
- Thomas Jefferson Middle School (1922) 958 Selden.
- Greenfield Park Elementary School (1922) 17501 Brush, Highland Park, MI, Demolished in 2017.
- Orlando M. Poe Elementary School (1922) 1300 West Canfield.
- Winterhalter Elementary School (1922) 12121 Broadstreet.
- Franklin School (1923) 1333 Pine.
- Elizabeth Courville Elementary School (1923) 18040 St. Aubin.
- Burroughs Middle School (1923) 8950 Saint Cyril.
- Dexter M. Ferry Elementary School (1923) 2920 East Palmer, Demolished in 2010.
- Edna Chaffee Noble Elementary School (1923) 8646 Fullerton.
- Joseph W. Guyton Elementary School (1923) 355 Philip.
- Flint Central High School (1923) 601 Crapo Street, Flint, MI.
- Rackham Golf Course recreation building (1924) 1924 Huntington Woods, MI.
- Roosevelt Elementary School (1925) 11526 Linwood, Demolished.
- Dewitt Clinton Elementary School (1925) 8145 Chalfonte, Demolished in 2012.
- Central High School (1926) 2425 Tuxedo.
- Western Branch Y. M. C. A (1928) 1601 Clark.
- Edgar O. Durfee Intermediate School (1927) 2470 Collingwood.
- D. Bethune Duffield Elementary School (1927) 2715 Macomb.
- Louise Emma Munger Intermediate School (1927) 5525 Martin, Demolished in 2011.
- Arthur J. Stock Residence (1927) 110 Kenwood RoadGrosse Pointe Farms, MI.
- Riker Building (1928) 35 West Huron, Pontiac, MI.
- Griswold Memorial Auditorium (1929) 401 Hubbard, Allegan, MI.
- Elks Lodge Detroit #34 (1930) 8200 East Jefferson Avenue, Demolished in 1960.
- University of Detroit Jesuit High School & Academy (1931) 8400 South Cambridge.
- Auditorium for David MacKenzie High School (1938) 9275 Wyoming, Demolished in 2012.
- Louise H. Campbell Hall West Circle (1939) Michigan State University East Lansing, MI.
- Lavina Spindler Hall Oliver Lane (1940) Western Michigan University Kalamazoo, MI.
- Will Carlton Elementary School addition (1950) 11724 Casino.
- First Methodist Church (1950) 22331 Woodward Avenue, Ferndale, MI.

== See also ==
- Architecture of metropolitan Detroit
