= George P. MacNichol House =

Historic house in Michigan, United States

- U.S. National Register of Historic Places
- Michigan State Historic Site
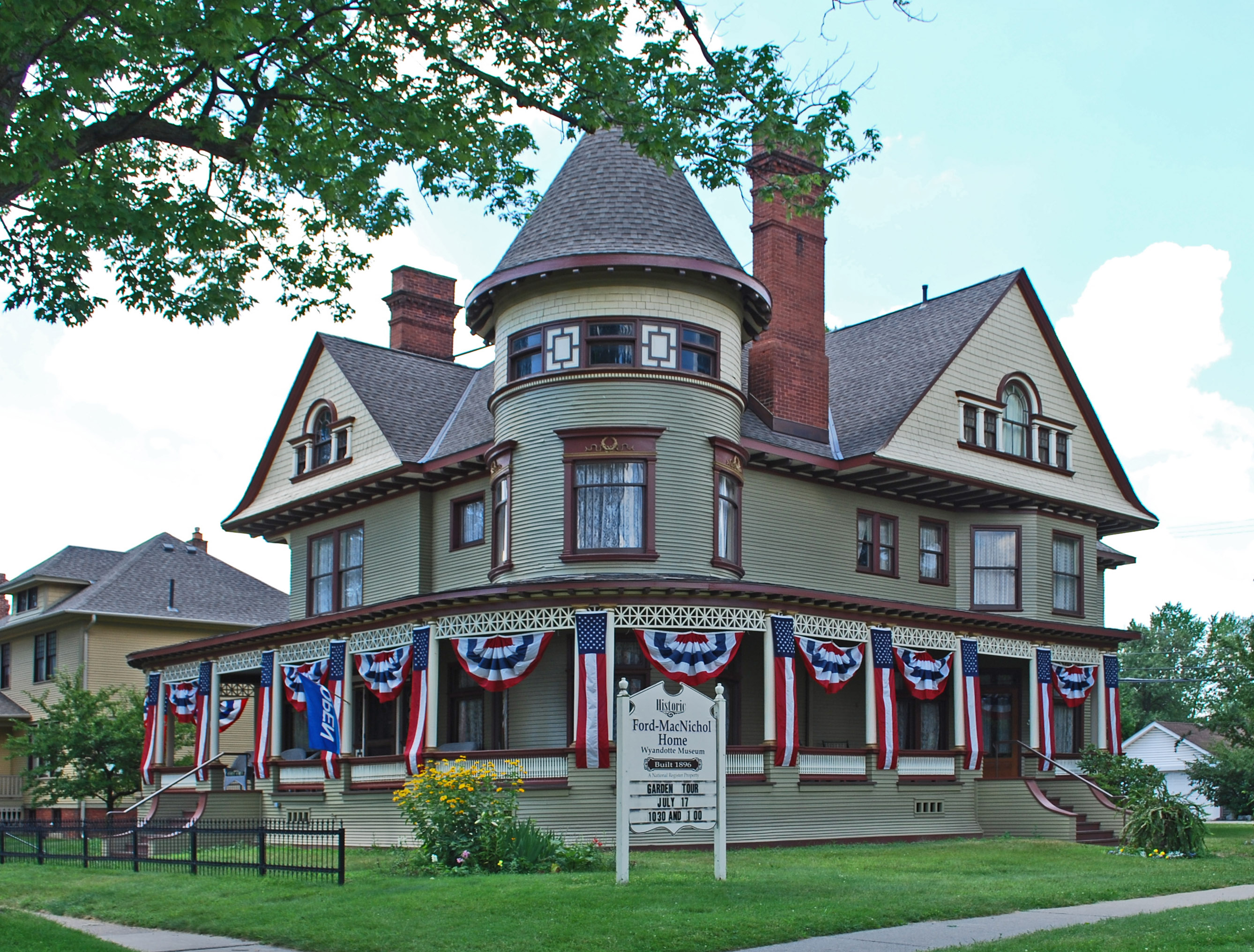

- Location within Michigan Location within the United States
- Interactive map
- Location: 2610 Biddle Ave., Wyandotte, Michigan
- Coordinates: 42°12′27″N 83°8′56″W
- Area: less than one acre
- Built: 1896
- Architect: Malcomson & Higginbotham
- Architectural style: Queen Anne
- NRHP reference No.: 84001859

Significant dates
- Added to NRHP: May 24, 1984
- Designated MSHS: November 15, 1973

The George P. MacNichol House, also known as the Ford-MacNichol House, is a house located at 2610 Biddle Avenue in Wyandotte, Michigan. It was designated a Michigan State Historic Site in 1973 and listed on the National Register of Historic Places in 1984.

The house is currently used as the main historic house museum of Wyandotte Museums. The Marx House is also owned by the Museums and used for art exhibits and community meeting space.

== History ==
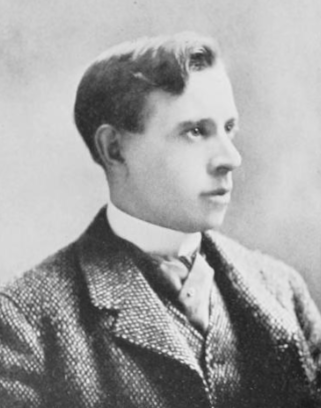
George Pope MacNichol

Edward Ford (also the builder of the Ford-Bacon House across the street) was the son of glass pioneer John Baptiste Ford and the founder of the Michigan Alkali Company in Wyandotte and the Ford Plate Glass Company in Toledo, Ohio, (later the Libbey–Owens–Ford Company). In 1896, Ford hired Malcomson & Higginbotham to design this home as wedding gift for his daughter Laura on her marriage to George P. MacNichol. MacNichol was a medical doctor, but was active in research and development work for both the Ford Plate Glass Company and the Michigan Alkali Company. The couple lived in the house for seven years before moving to Toledo to be closer to family.

After the MacNichols moved, the house was purchased by Jeremiah Drennen, a local lawyer. The Drennen family owned the house until the 1970s, when it was purchased by Yvonne Latta. Latta restored the house, and in 1977, it was purchased by the city of Wyandotte.

== Description ==
The George P. MacNichol House is a two-and-one-half-story wood-framed rectangular-plan gabled Queen Anne house. It has 32 rooms and 6,600 feet of interior space, with 6 fireplaces, 65 windows, and 53 doors. The roof and gables are steeply pitched. The front facade features a one-story wraparound porch with Tuscan columns and under-eave latticework, and a corner turret with conical roof. Most of the house is sheathed in clapboards, with the gable ends and upper portion of the tower covered in shingles.

The house is significant as an example of the residential architecture of the firm of Malcomson & Higginbotham, and for the house's association with some of the community's most prominent people.
