= Amy Hayes =

Amy Hayes may refer to:

- Amy Beth Hayes (born 1982), British actress
- Amy Hayes (announcer) (born 1973), American ring announcer
