= Frederick K. Stearns House =

Historic house in Michigan, United States

- U.S. National Register of Historic Places
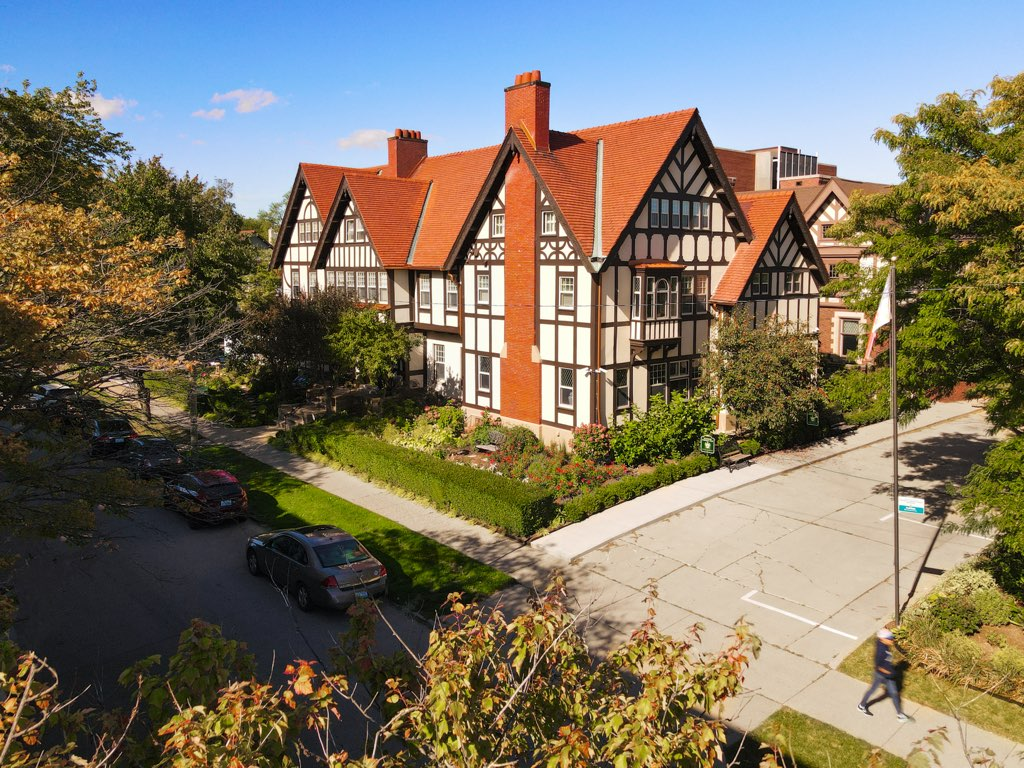
- Frederick Stearns House as of 2022
- Interactive map
- Location: 8109 East Jefferson Avenue; Detroit, Michigan
- Coordinates: 42°21′7″N 82°59′42″W
- Built: 1902
- Architect: Stratton & Baldwin
- MPS: East Jefferson Avenue Residential TR
- NRHP reference No.: 85002947
- Added to NRHP: October 9, 1985

The Frederick K. Stearns House is a historic inn located at 8109 East Jefferson Avenue in Detroit, Michigan, directly adjacent to the Arthur M. Parker House and Indian Village. Built as a single family home for businessman Frederick K. Stearns, it now houses a bed and breakfast. It was listed on the National Register of Historic Places in 1985.

== Description ==
The Frederick K. Stearns House is a two-and-one-half-story house constructed from hollow tile. It has a gabled roof and stuccoed, half timber façades. The medieval feel of the house is accentuated through the use of varied window sizes, and by several projecting bays and broad roof surfaces. The house is known for its original painted glass windows and moravian tile work and pewabic fireplace.

== Significance ==
This house was built for Frederick K. Stearns, son of the founder of a pharmaceutical firm that built the Frederick Stearns Building, also located on Jefferson Avenue, and who served as its president from 1887 to 1921. It is also significant because of its fine medieval and Arts and Crafts design.

The home underwent extensive restoration and renovation from 2018 to 2022. It was opened on June 11, 2022, as a historic inn with an speakeasy downstairs. It has a large collection of oil paintings and antique furniture.
