= Wyandotte Municipal Services =

Not-for-profit service provider in Michigan

- Company type: Non-Profit, Consumer-Owned
- Industry: Electric, Water, Telecommunications
- Founded: 1889 in Wyandotte, Michigan, USA
- Headquarters: Wyandotte, Michigan, US
- Key people: Roderick J. Lesko; General Manager
- Products: Electric Service, Broadband Internet, VoIP, Water Services
- Website: wyan.org

Wyandotte Municipal Services is a not-for-profit service provider located in Wyandotte, Michigan. The services that WMS provides are electric, cable telecommunications, and water supply and treatment to the City of Wyandotte. WMS was created by local residents more than 100 years ago. The City of Wyandotte, Michigan is the only community to own and operate its own power plant, water treatment plant, and cable TV headend.

The system consists of:

- Over 275 digital channels
- Digital pay-per-view selections
- Two Public, educational, and government access (PEG) cable TV channels without additional charge

The system contributes five percent of gross revenue to the city's general fund. The system is up-to-date. It was rebuilt from the headend to the consumer in 1998. The system converted to digital in 2014, coinciding with a rebranding into Wyandotte Cable. Again, WMS also owns the lines and they are separate from surrounding communities. It consists of:

- 25-miles of fiber optic cable backbone
- 72-miles of coaxial cable
- 3,000 strand miles of fiber optic cable

The system has its benefits over the other communities, both in monthly service charges and in customer service.

WMS is currently in the process of replacing its coaxial cable system and headend with a fiber optic network. The fiber network will be ready for use soon.

== Electric Services ==
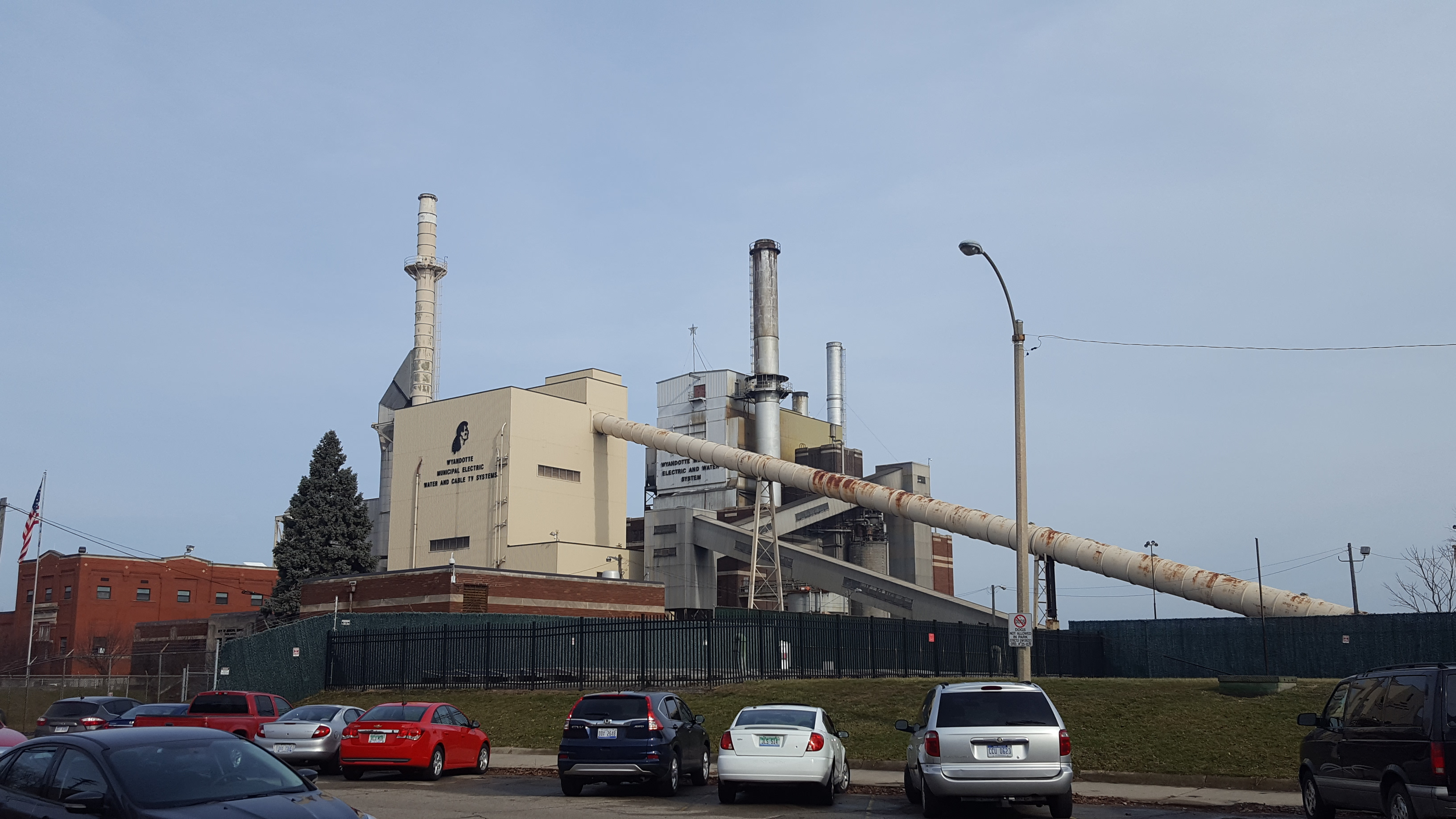
Wyandotte Power plant

In December 1889, the Wyandotte Electric Light Company initially provided street lighting and electric service for the city. At this time, the company was a for-profit entity. After a few years, residents voted to create a municipal electric utility.

Currently, WMS is one of the 41 public power systems in Michigan and one of 2,000 public power systems in the United States. The electric system alone generates $22.2 million in revenues, and sold 282 million kilowatt-hours in the year 2001. It is a member of the American Municipal Power-Ohio.

Peak electric demands, which occur during the summer, span from 65 to 70 megawatts. The electric system has two sources of supply to provide reliable, and most economical service:

- A 70-megawatt municipal power plant
- A 98-megawatt interconnection with ITC's 120,000-volt transmission system

=== Wyandotte Municipal Power Plant ===
The Wyandotte municipal power plant has three boilers and four generators. Types of fuels that are consumed are coal, natural gas and tire derived fuel (TDF). TDF is more efficient than coal, has a higher BTU value than coal, and is about half the price of coal. It produces nearly the same emissions. 95% of ash produced at the power plant becomes recycled materials like cement, and is used in steel production. 13,000 tons of TDF (which is the equivalent of 2.6 million tires) were used at the power plant in 2001.

=== Wyandotte Municipal Electric Distribution System ===
The electric distribution system is separate from that of the surrounding areas. WMS owns its own lines, which in turn, are connected to the municipal power plant. Also, without additional charge, WMS maintains street lighting in the community.

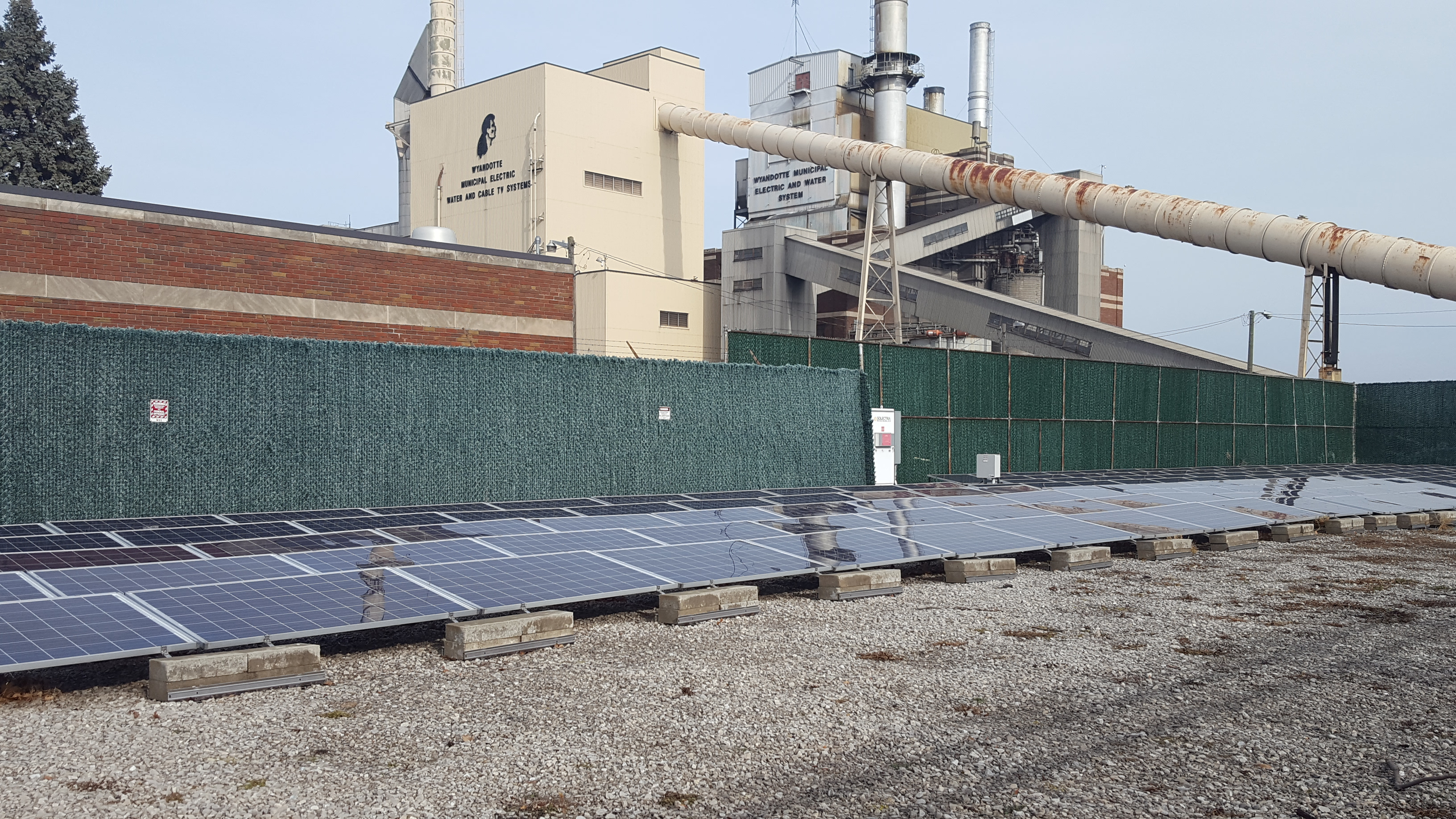
Wyandotte has a program installing solar panels around the city.

== Water Services ==
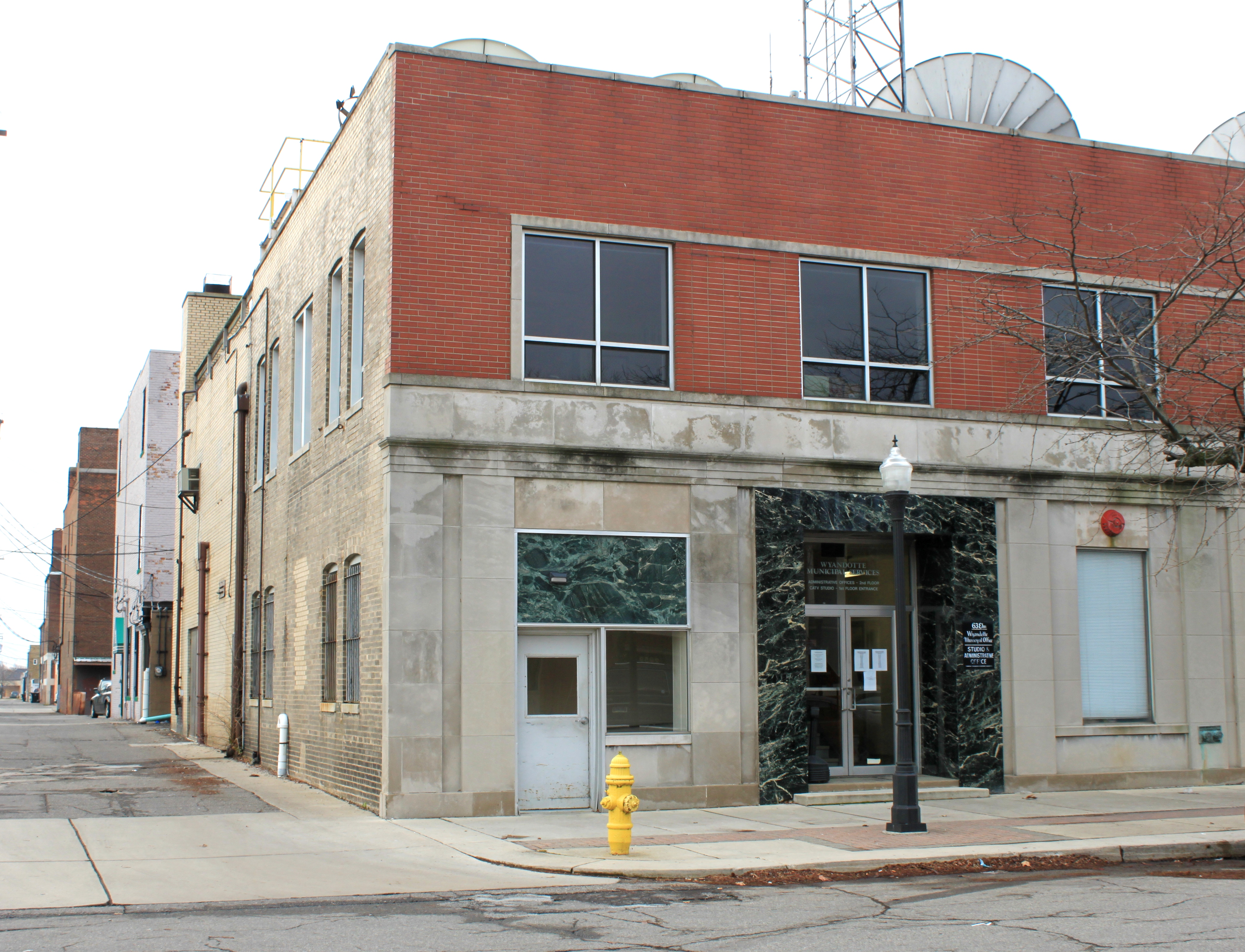
WMS administrative offices and studio

Local residents also created the Wyandotte municipal water utility. The utility has 11,142 consumers, and $2.4 million alone in revenue. 1.86 billion US gallons (7,000,000 m^{3}) of water were used in 2001.

=== Wyandotte Municipal Water Distribution System ===
The municipal water system is separate from that of surrounding areas. The system consists of:

- 110 miles (180 km) of water mains ranging from 4 inches (100 mm) to 30 inches (760 mm) in diameter.
- 850 fire hydrants
- 500,000-US-gallon (1,900,000 L) water tower located in the south end of town
- 4.5 million US gallons (17,000 m^{3}) of storage at ground level for peak demand and fire fighting.
