= Arthur M. Parker House =

Historic house in Michigan, United States

- U.S. National Register of Historic Places
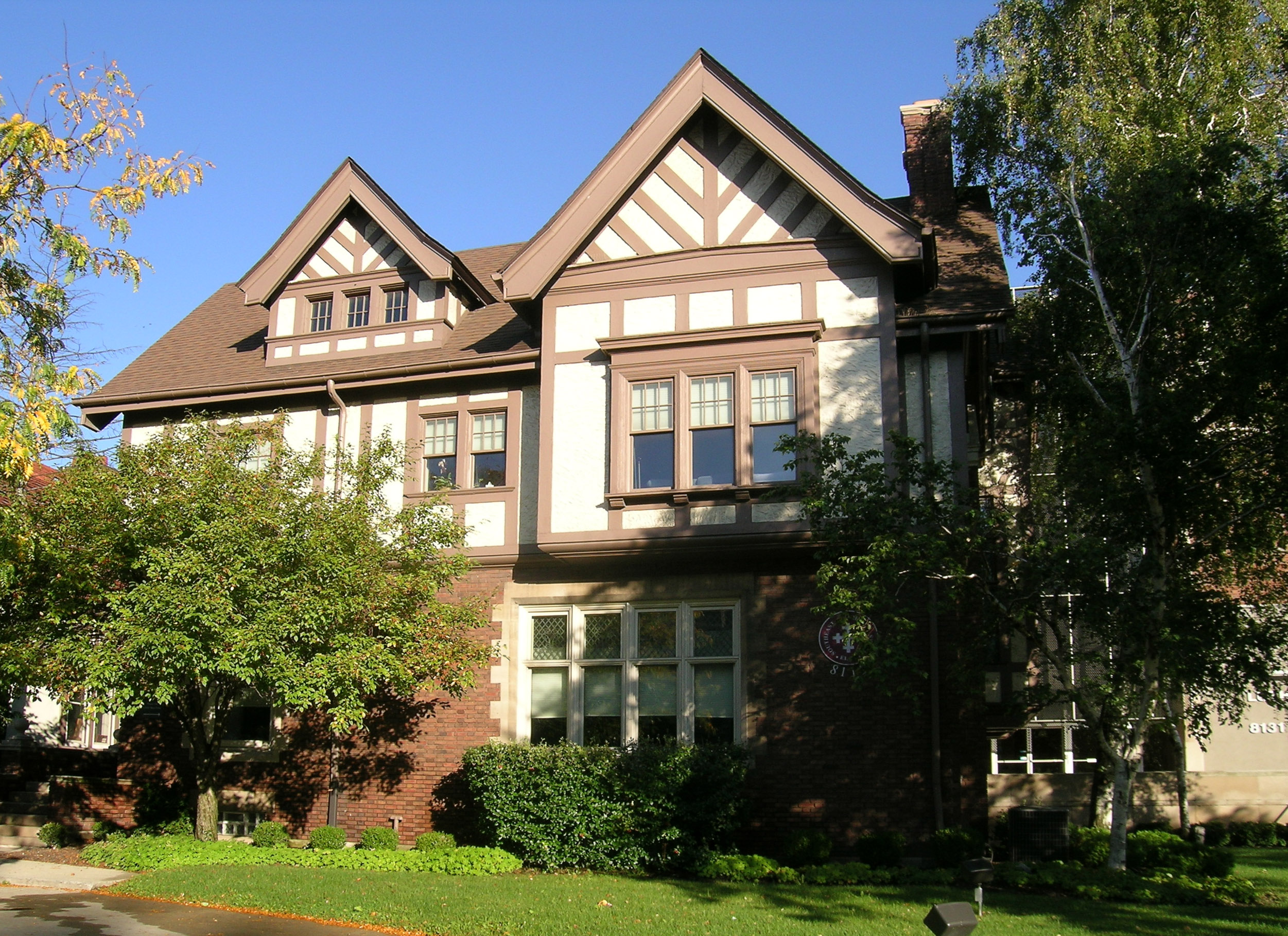

- Location within Michigan Location within the United States
- Interactive map
- Location: 8115 E. Jefferson Ave., Detroit, Michigan
- Coordinates: 42°21′10″N 82°59′36″W
- Built: 1901
- Architect: Malcomson & Higginbotham
- MPS: East Jefferson Avenue Residential TR
- NRHP reference No.: 85002943
- Added to NRHP: October 9, 1985

The Arthur M. Parker House (also known as the Parker House) is a historic house located at 8115 East Jefferson Avenue in Detroit, Michigan, directly adjacent to the Frederick K. Stearns House. It was listed on the National Register of Historic Places on October 9, 1985.

== Description ==
The Arthur M. Parker House is a two-and-one-half-story building, faced with brick on the first story and stucco and half-timbering above. The house has a medieval character reinforced by irregular bays, though more restrained than the next-door Frederick K. Stearns House.The Arthur M. Parker House is significant for its neo-medieval design.

== History ==
The Arthur M. Parker House was built in 1901. The house was designed for Arthur M. Parker, secretary-treasurer of the Detroit Boiler Company, by the Detroit firm of Malcomson & Higginbotham. By the 1980s, the house was being used by the Detroit School Board. By the 2000s, the house is used as the headquarters of the Southeast Michigan Synod - Evangelical Lutheran Church in America.
