= Frederick K. Stearns =

American businessman

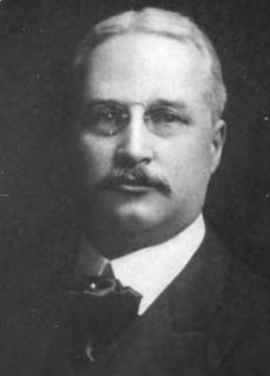
- Born: December 6, 1854; Buffalo, New York, U.S.
- Died: June 7, 1924; Beverly Hills, California, U S.
- Education: University of Michigan
- Occupations: Owner of Detroit Wolverines (MLB), businessman
- Political party: Republican
- Spouse: Helen E. Sweet
- Children: Edward Sweet Stearns
- Parent(s): Frederick and Eliza (Kimball) Stearns

Frederick Kimball Stearns (December 6, 1854 – June 7, 1924) was an American businessman who was the president of Frederick Stearns & Company, a pharmaceutical manufacturing business, from 1887 to 1921. He was also the organizer of the Detroit Orchestral Association, which later became the Detroit Symphony Orchestra, a trustee of the Detroit Museum of Art, and the owner of the Detroit Wolverines baseball team in the National League from 1885 to 1888.

== Biography ==
Stearns was born in Buffalo, New York, in 1854, the son of Frederick and Eliza (Kimball) Stearns. He moved to Detroit with his parents as a child and was educated at the Philo M. Patterson Classical School. He enrolled in the University of Michigan in 1873 where he was the captain and second baseman for the Michigan Wolverines baseball team. He left the university as a junior to join his father's pharmaceutical manufacturing business, Frederick Stearns & Company. He became president of the company in 1887. Stearns resigned as president of the family business in 1921 to become chairman of the board.

In 1885, Stearns acquired the Detroit Wolverines baseball club and became its president. During his ownership, the team acquired a number of star players, including future Baseball Hall of Fame inductees Sam Thompson and Dan Brouthers. Stearns spent $25,000 (equal to $895,833 today) between 1885 and 1887 to turn Detroit into a powerhouse team. His 1887 team won the National League pennant and went on to defeat St. Louis in the 1887 World Series.

Stearns also served as a trustee of the Detroit Museum of Art and was the organizer of the Detroit Orchestral Association, which later became the Detroit Symphony Orchestra. He later moved to Beverly Hills and served on the board of directors of the Los Angeles Philharmonic Orchestra.

Stearns was married in October 1878 to Helen E. Sweet. They had three children, Frederick Sweet Stearns, Marjorie (Stearns) Dyar, and Alan Stearns. Their Elizabethan home on Jefferson Avenue in Detroit was known as "Red Gables" and is now a registered historic site.

The Detroit Century Box, a time capsule, contains a letter written by Stearns in 1900.

== See also ==
- Frederick K. Stearns House
- Frederick Stearns Building
