= Jefferson Intermediate School =

- U.S. National Register of Historic Places
- U.S. Historic district
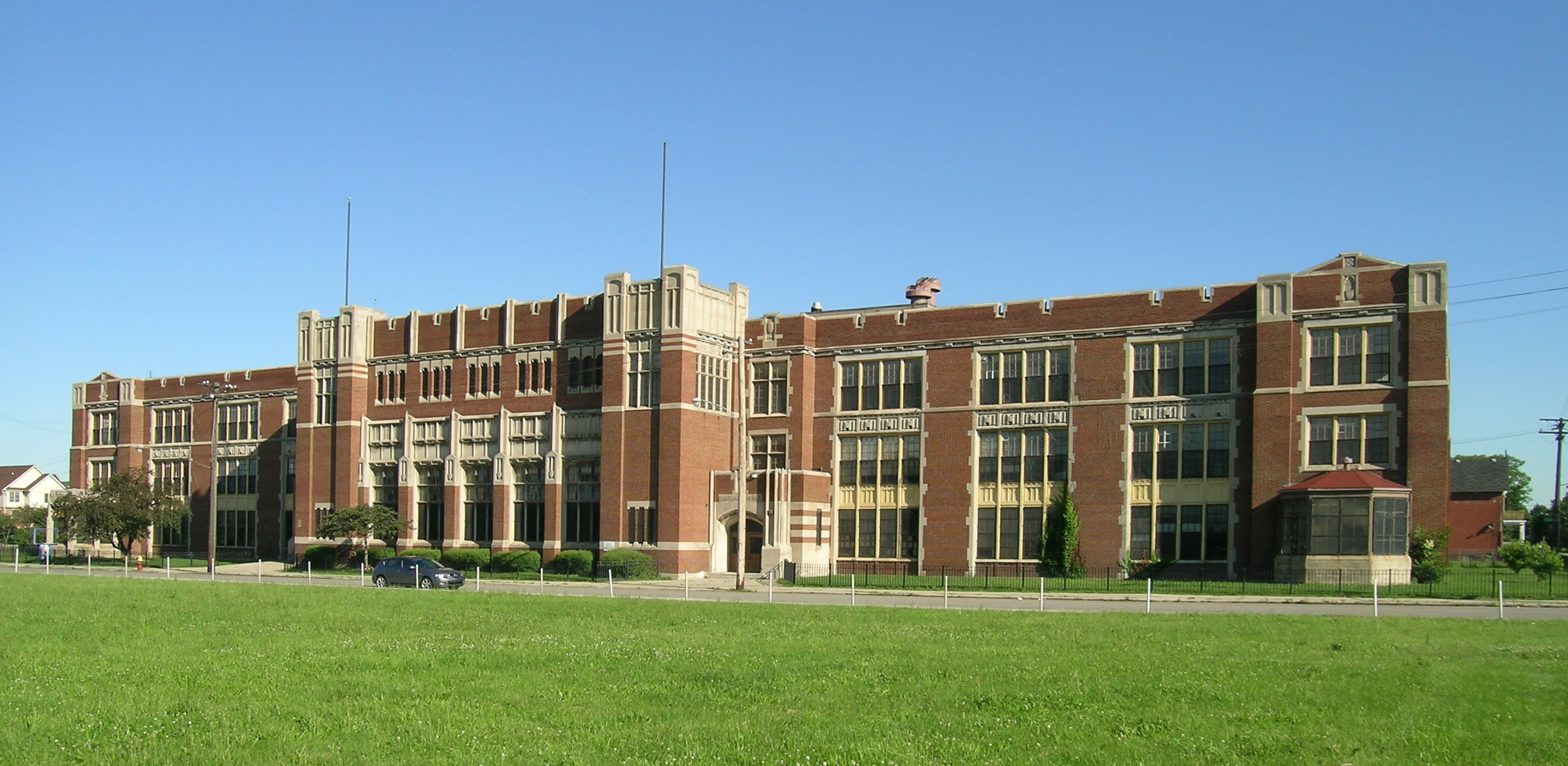
- Interactive map
- Location: 938 Selden Street; Detroit, Michigan
- Coordinates: 42°20′47″N 83°04′07″W
- Built: 1922
- Architect: Malcomson, Higginbotham, & Palmer
- Architectural style: Late 19th And 20th Century Revivals, Tudor Revival
- MPS: Cass Farm MPS
- NRHP reference No.: 97001094
- Added to NRHP: September 22, 1997

The Jefferson Intermediate School is a school building located at 938 Selden Street in Detroit, Michigan. It is also known as Jefferson Junior High School or Jefferson School. The school was listed on the National Register of Historic Places in 1997.

== History ==
The site on which the Jefferson School sits was purchased by the city of Detroit in 1869, and an elementary school was built on the property in 1873 at a cost of $60,000. In 1915, additional lots to the west were purchased for a playground. However, the old school was considered dilapidated, and in 1922, the city tore it down and began construction of the building now occupying the site. The structure, designed by Malcomson, Higginbotham, & Palmer, was completed in 1923 at a cost of $706,000.

During the 1950s, the Lodge Freeway was constructed, running directly to the west of the school through what was once the playground. As of 2008, the building has been rehabilitated and served as a public charter school, Experiencia Preparatory Academy, serving grades K–11. Experiencia closed in 2016. As of 2019, the building is being redeveloped into office space.

== Description ==
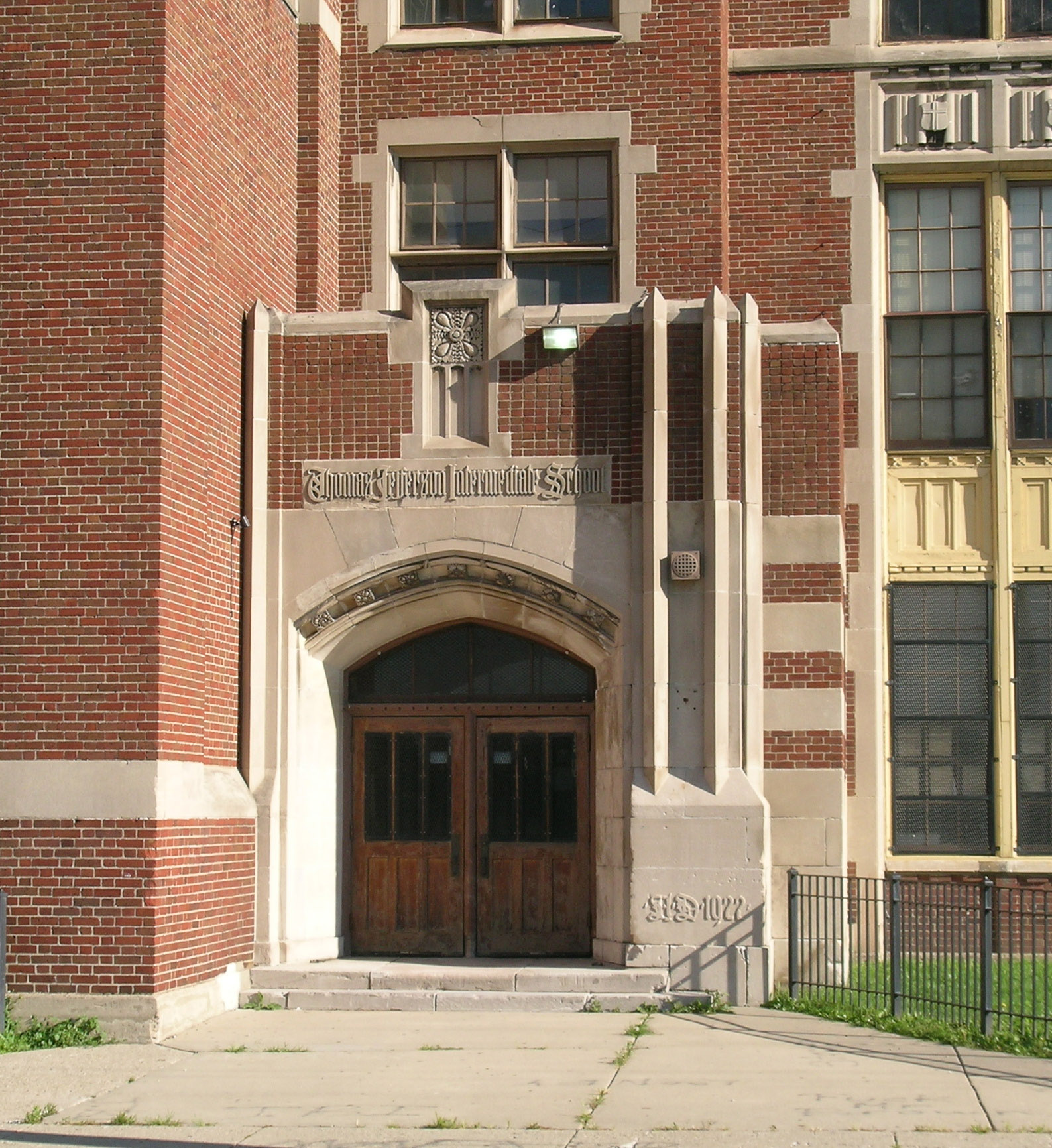
Entrance to Jefferson Intermediate School

The Jefferson School is a three-story rectangular Tudor Revival school building, finished with brick and limestone, with a flat roof. The front facade has a stone-faced foundation, and is divided into three sections. The center section protrudes slightly, and the two flanking sections make up a nearly symmetrical facade. Each end of the central section projects slightly farther than the main body and protrudes above the roofline, forming a pair of "towers." Between the "towers," the center section is divided into five bays with a continuous stone water table running through them. Each bay has a two-story window sitting on the water table, with a decorative stone transom at the first story level and three windows on the third story. The center section is topped with a stone cornice and brick parapet wall.

The two flanking sections are also divided into five bays each. The left hand section has two outer bays which protrude slightly, and an inner bay containing an arched stone entryway which protrudes from the facade. At the second and third story above the entrance are pairs of windows. The outermost bay contains a similar entryway, but is constructed of stone, and with a five sided bay window with a shaped parapet. The right-hand section nearly mirrors the left-hand section, but without the second entrance and bay window. The three central bays in each section contain three-story windows with decorative stone spandrels on the second and third floors.

The interior originally contained 53 rooms. Utilities are located in the basement under the main section. The upper three floors of the schools have a similar arrangement, with larger rooms located near the center, a U-shaped hallway, and smaller rooms on either side. The first floor contained an auditorium, as well as a conference room, shop rooms, a science room, and other classrooms. The second floor contained a gymnasium, a teacher's work room, administrative office, art/design and sewing room, and general classrooms. The third floor contained a library, lunch room, cooking housekeeping, and typewriting rooms, and more general classrooms.
