= Hook and Ladder House No. 5–Detroit Fire Department Repair Shop =

- U.S. National Register of Historic Places
- Michigan State Historic Site
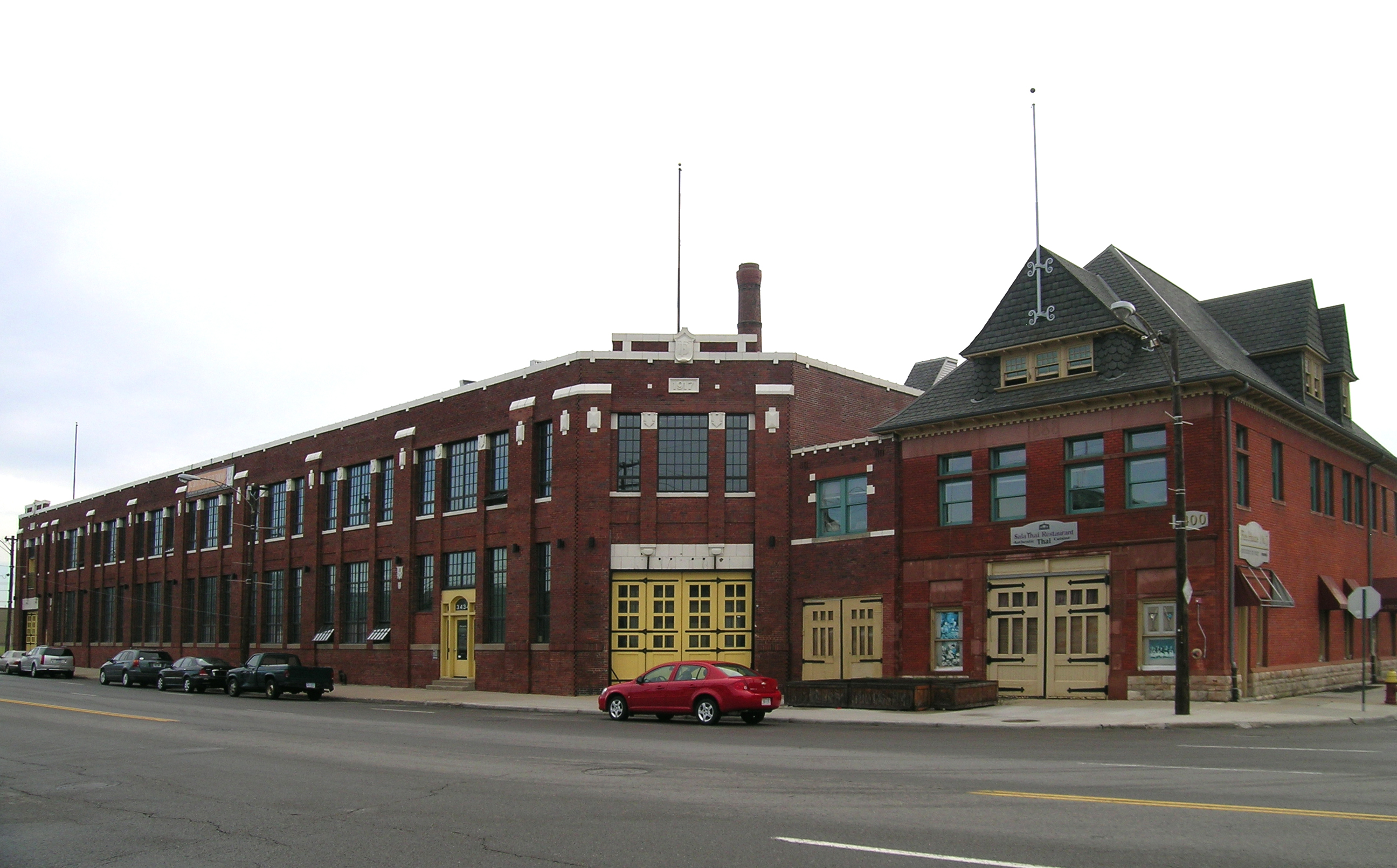
- To the left is the Detroit Fire Department Repair Shop; to the right is Hook and Ladder House No. 5.
- Interactive map
- Location: 3400, 3434 Russell Street; Detroit, Michigan
- Coordinates: 42°21′4″N 83°2′35″W
- Built: 1888, 1917
- Architect: William G. Malcomson & William E. Higginbotham
- Architectural style: Queen Anne, Early Commercial
- NRHP reference No.: 97001481

Significant dates
- Added to NRHP: December 01, 1997
- Designated MSHS: June 19, 1975

The Hook and Ladder House No. 5 and the Detroit Fire Department Repair Shop are two cojoined structures located at 3400 and 3434 Russell Street in Detroit, Michigan. The Hook and Ladder House No. 5 is the second oldest surviving fire station in Detroit, was designated a Michigan State Historic Site in 1975 and was listed on the National Register of Historic Places in 1997.

== History ==
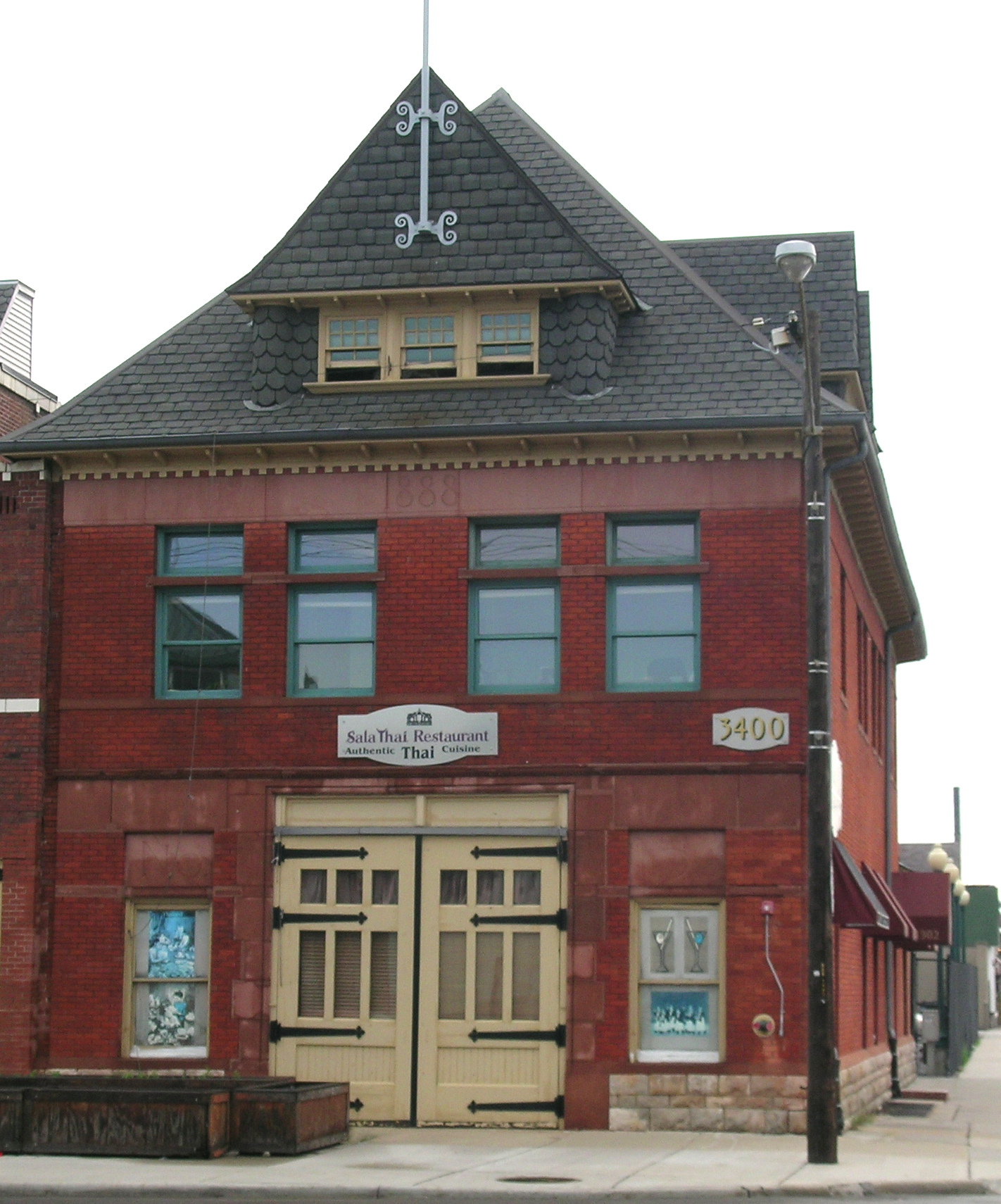
Hook and Ladder House No. 5, now Sala Thai

The Detroit Hook and Ladder House no. 5 was built in 1888; it was designed by the architectural firm of Malcomson and Higginbotham. The station was built to provide protection to the surrounding neighborhood and the imminently expanding Eastern Market. In 1911, a small annex was built to serve as a repair shop for the departments's growing fleet of motorized fire engines. In 1917, the larger repair shop designed by Raseman & Frier was built; the 1911 annex joins the repair shop to the hook and ladder house.

Hook and Ladder No. 5 was in use as a fire station until 1956, when a new station built nearby replaced it. The Detroit Fire Department Repair Shop was used until recently by the Detroit Department of Public Works as a maintenance yard, carpenter shop, and electrical shop.

== Description ==
Hook and Ladder house No. 5 is a two-story Queen Anne style red brick and stone building with third floor attic space. The roof is a steeply pitched hip roof with shingled dormers. The original wood swinging doors are still located on the front façade.

Both the small 1911 annex and the large 1917 repair shop are two story brick buildings trimmed with terra cotta. The repair shop has zero setback from the street, yet is clearly designed to relate to the fire station through the positioning of its southwest corner entrance at an angle meeting the setback of the fire station and annex.

== Current use ==
The properties were listed on the state historical register in 1975, and on the National Register of Historic Places in 1997. In September 2002, the Sala Thai restaurant opened in the ground floor of the Hook and Ladder No. 5 building. The Detroit Fire Department Repair Shop has been renovated, and is now known as the FD Lofts, featuring over 30 loft spaces from 900 to 1700 square feet.
