= Ford–Bacon House =

Historic house in Michigan, United States

- U.S. National Register of Historic Places
- Michigan State Historic Site
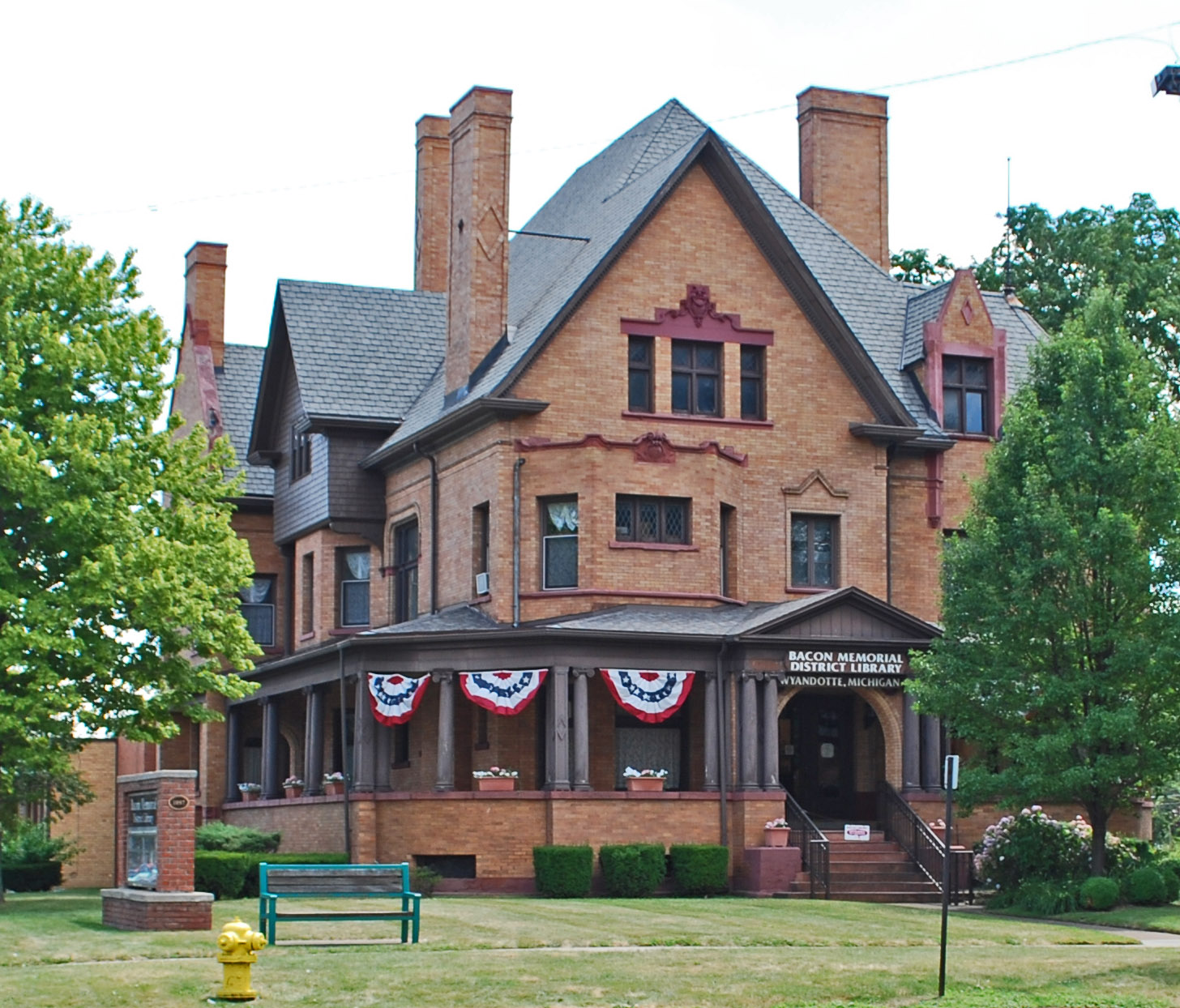

- Location within Michigan Location within the United States
- Interactive map
- Location: 45 Vinewood, Wyandotte, Michigan
- Coordinates: 42°12′26″N 83°8′54″W
- Area: less than one acre
- Built: 1897
- Architect: Malcomson & Higginbotham
- Architectural style: Queen Anne
- NRHP reference No.: 97001476

Significant dates
- Added to NRHP: December 01, 1997
- Designated MSHS: February 19, 1987

The Ford–Bacon House is located at 45 Vinewood in Wyandotte, Michigan. It was designated a Michigan State Historic Site in 1987 and listed on the National Register of Historic Places in 1997. It is now used as the Bacon Memorial District Library.

== History ==
Edward Ford (also the builder of the George P. MacNichol House across the street) was the son of plate glass pioneer John Baptiste Ford and the founder of the Michigan Alkali Company in Wyandotte and the Ford Plate Glass Company in Toledo, Ohio, (later the Libbey–Owens–Ford Company). In 1897, Ford hired Malcomson & Higginbotham to design this house for himself and his wife Carrie. Ford lived in the house only a short time before moving to Toledo, Ohio in 1900. Ford's son, John B Ford, occupied the house from 1900 to 1902, and in 1902, Edward Ford's daughter Mary Ford Bacon and her husband Mark R. Bacon moved in. The couple lived here from 1902 to 1942, although they spent a considerable number of their later years in California. When Mark Bacon died in 1942, Mary gave the house to the Wyandotte Public School System. The building now serves as the public library.

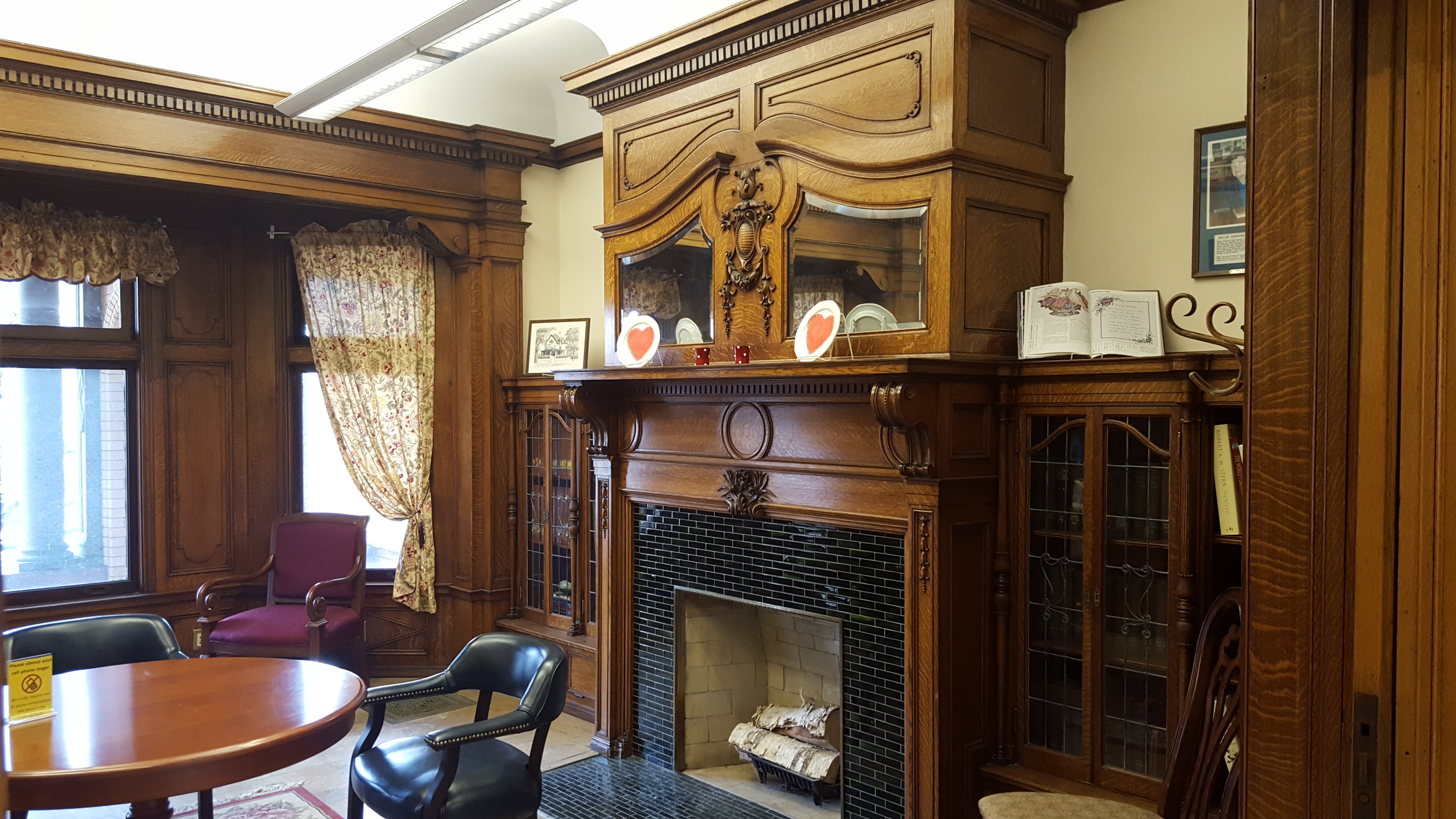
One of the reading rooms

== Description ==
The Ford–Bacon House is a four-story Queen Anne house built from buff-colored brick with red sandstone trim. The house measures 62 feet by 95 feet, sits on four city lots, and contains 27 rooms and 11 fireplaces. A wide porch extends along the front and side of the house, and the hipped roof was originally covered with black slate. A four-story bell tower is located in the rear, and the house features gabled dormers, a two-story side bay, and square brick chimneys.
