= Frederick Stearns Building =

- U.S. National Register of Historic Places
- Michigan State Historic Site
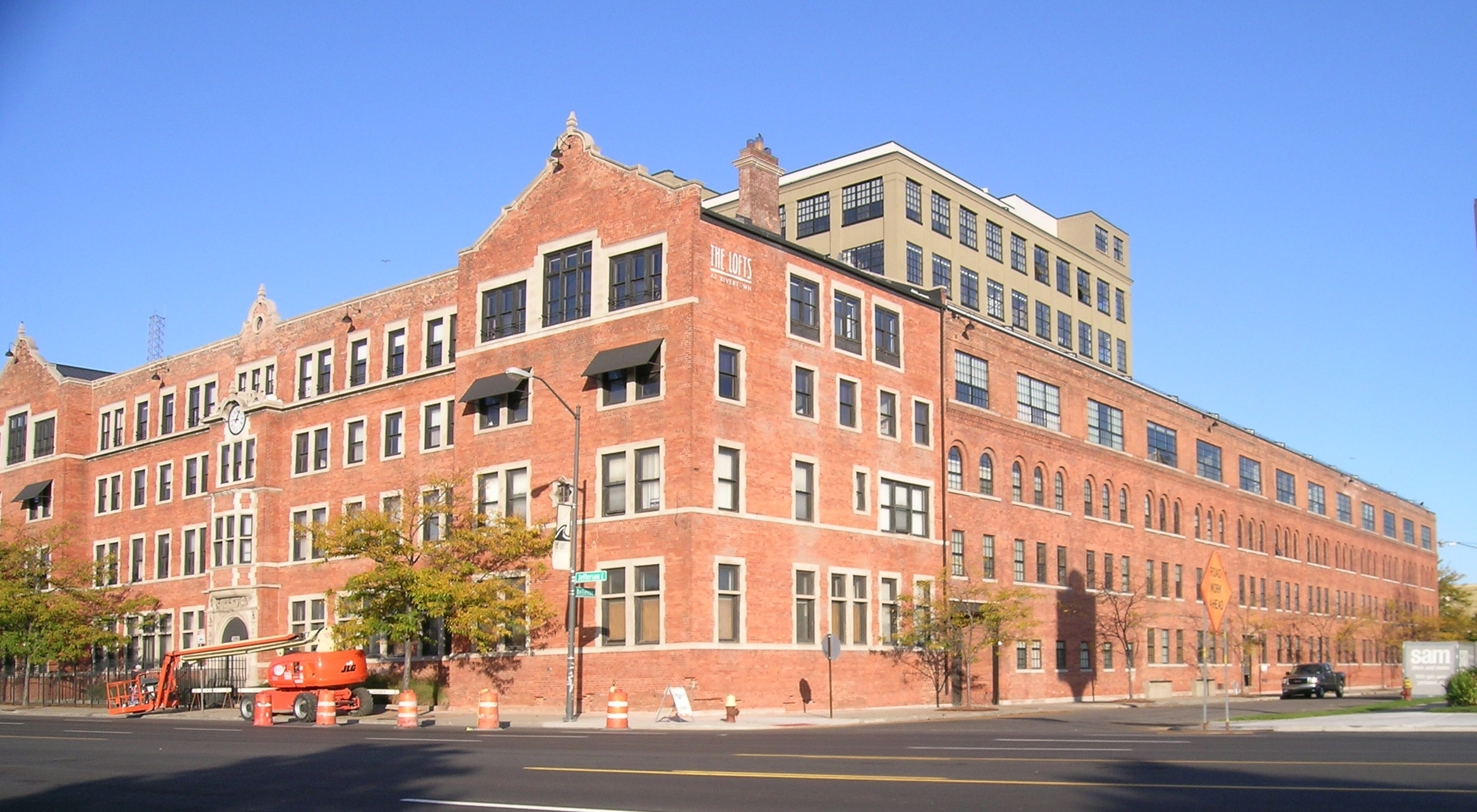
- Interactive map
- Location: 6533 E. Jefferson Ave., Detroit, Michigan
- Coordinates: 42°20′45″N 83°0′24″W
- Built: 1899; ca. 1910 (addition)
- Architect: William B. Stratton; Albert Kahn
- NRHP reference No.: 80001927

Significant dates
- Added to NRHP: October 14, 1980
- Designated MSHS: January 8, 1981

The Frederick Stearns Building is a manufacturing plant located at 6533 East Jefferson Avenue in Detroit, Michigan. The building was listed on the National Register of Historic Places in 1980 and designated a Michigan State Historic Site in 1981. It has been converted to condominiums.

== History ==
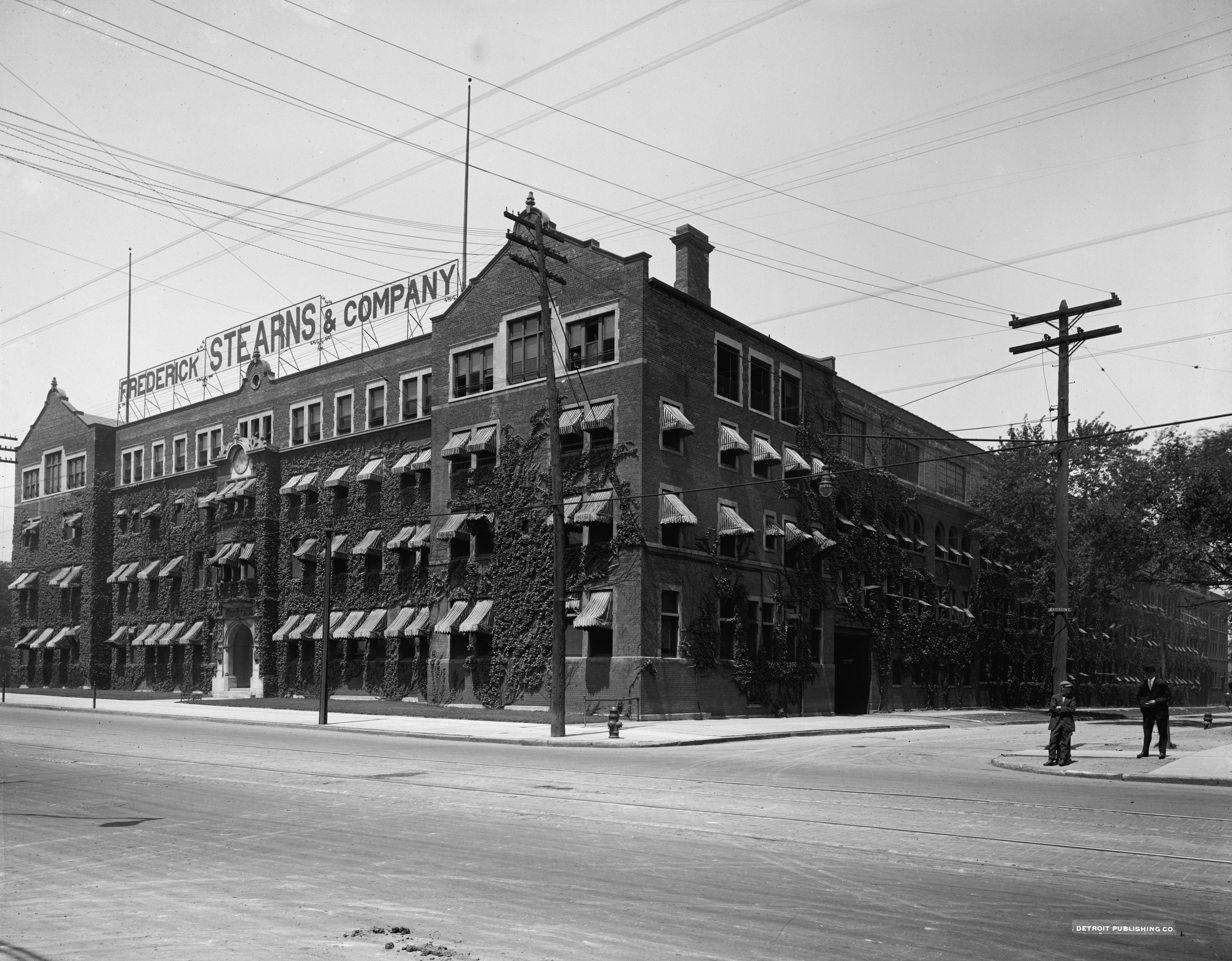
Frederick Stearns Building, c. 1910

Frederick Stearns & Company, established in 1855, was a leading pharmaceutical manufacturer in 19th century Detroit. In the late 1890s, Frederick K. Stearns (son of the firm's founder, Frederick A. Stearns) commissioned William B. Stratton to design this building (Stratton also designed Stearns's personal home, the Frederick K. Stearns House, a few years later). Construction was completed in 1899 at a cost of $85,000. It originally contained Stearns's production facilities, as well as warehouses and white-collar offices.

The building was converted into condominiums in 1989, and is now known as the Lofts at Rivertown.

== Description ==
The building was originally three stories in height; a fourth floor was added later. The original building, with its upper story addition, is constructed from brick. The façade is symmetric, with projecting pavilions at each end and another in the center; this front section, which housed the company offices, is 13 bays wide and five bays deep. The center pavilion contains an arched stone entryway and a clock on the third floor. Each window in the Jefferson façade is trimmed with limestone. Fourth-floor gables above the end pavilions add to the appeal of the building.

A taller concrete addition, the top of which can be seen from Jefferson, was built around 1910. This addition was designed by Albert Kahn.
