= Wyandotte Boat Club =

Wyandotte Boat Club is a non-profit organization located in Wyandotte, Michigan along the Detroit River dedicated to the promotion of the sport of rowing within the Downriver area of Metro Detroit. The Wyandotte Boat Club was established in 1875. It is the home to 7 Local High Schools. They host two high school regattas, the Hebda Cup, held in late April and the Wyandotte High Schools Regatta or WyHi held in early May.

== High School Rowing Teams ==
- Wyandotte Roosevelt
- Riverview
- Gibraltar Carlson
- Grosse Ile
- Southgate Anderson
- Dearborn Heights Crestwood
- Trenton.

== Programs ==
The WBC offers different Summer and Fall programs which include Competitive, Masters, Recreational and Youth Rowing.

== Junior B ==
This program offered in the Summer Program. For anyone under 16 who is interested in rowing. This program is usually made up of high school Freshmen and Sophomores who are looking to gain skill and compete against high end competition. Junior "B" rowing is offered to both Men and Women.

== Junior A ==
This program offered in the Summer Program. For anyone under 18 who is interested in rowing. This program is usually made up of high school Juniors and Seniors who are looking to compete against high end competition. Junior "A" rowing is offered to both men and women.

== Senior B (under 23) ==
This program offered in the Summer Program. The Senior "B" category is for anyone with an age between 18 and 23. This category is broken up into different weight categories. The 140 pound category is offered to only the men's crew. The 115 pound category is offered to the women's crew only. The 130 pound category is another weight category for women as is the 155 pound category for men. Senior "B's" also offers open weight categories to both men and women.

== Senior ==
The Senior category is anyone older than 23 years. This category is broken up into different weight categories as well. They too offer the 140 pound category to men only. The 115 pound category and the 130 pound category is offered only to the women and the 155 pound category for men. Senior's are the toughest events to compete in because most oarsmen in this event are very experienced.

== Masters (over 27) ==
This program offered in the Summer Program. Men and women, older athletes that wish to train and compete against equal or near equal competition. Master's races are mostly not as long as Senior or Junior races.

== Recreational Rowing ==
This program offered in the Summer Program. Men and women, for anyone who has interest in the sport can sign up. For people looking to get a workout, learn the sport, and experience the challenges of rowing.

== Youth Rowing ==
This program offered in the Summer Program. Boys and girls not yet in High School whom wish to learn the basics of rowing. Not as long as competitive season, usually offered if a few sessions a Summer.
