= Nellie Leland School =

- U.S. National Register of Historic Places
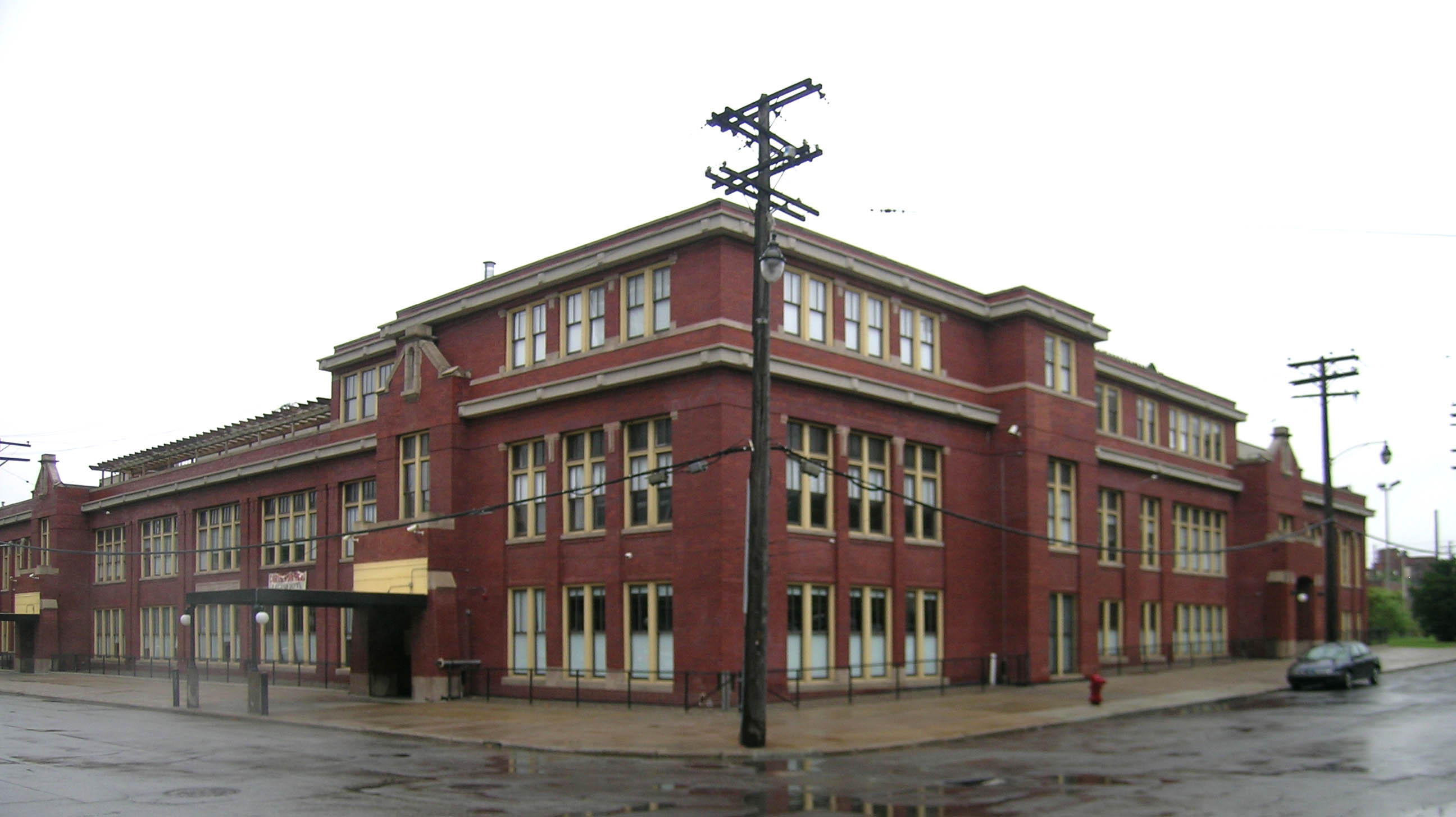
- Interactive map
- Location: 1395 Antietam Avenue; Detroit, Michigan
- Coordinates: 42°20′28″N 83°02′14″W
- Built: 1918
- Architect: William G. Malcomson & William E. Higginbotham
- Architectural style: Bungalow/Craftsman
- NRHP reference No.: 02000044
- Added to NRHP: February 14, 2002

The Nellie Leland School is a school building, originally built to serve handicapped children, located at 1395 Antietam Avenue in Detroit, Michigan (the former location of the Detroit Barracks, where Lieutenant Ulysses S. Grant served from 1849 to 1851). It was listed on the National Register of Historic Places in 2002. The building has been renovated into loft space.

== History ==
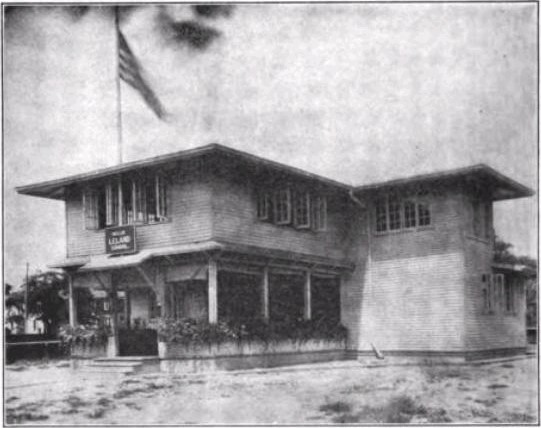
First Nellie Leland School, c. 1916

Henry M. Leland was a Detroit automotive pioneer who founded both the Cadillac and Lincoln automotive companies. His wife, Nellie Leland, was active in the philanthropic community, focusing on the hardships of poor citizens with tuberculosis and promoting the scientific search for a cure. Nellie Leland died in 1910, but two years later, Henry built an open air school to serve children in the early stages of tuberculosis, naming the structure after his wife.

At the time, there was no requirement for school systems to adapt to the needs of handicapped children. Leland encouraged Detroit school officials to build a school to serve the special needs of physically handicapped children, and in 1917 the Detroit School Board built the current structure at a cost of $111,495, transferring the name, Nellie Leland, from the earlier school. The Nellie Leland School contained innovative structural features that allowed handicapped children to learn, including such things as wheelchair ramps. The school proved popular, and in 1920, an addition was constructed to accommodate children awaiting admission; an elevator was added at the same time.

The Detroit school board operated the Leland school until 1981, when it was sold to a developer. In the mid-1990s, it was planned to use the building as a charter school, but it has instead been turned into loft space.
