= James A. Garfield School =

- U.S. National Register of Historic Places
- Michigan State Historic Site
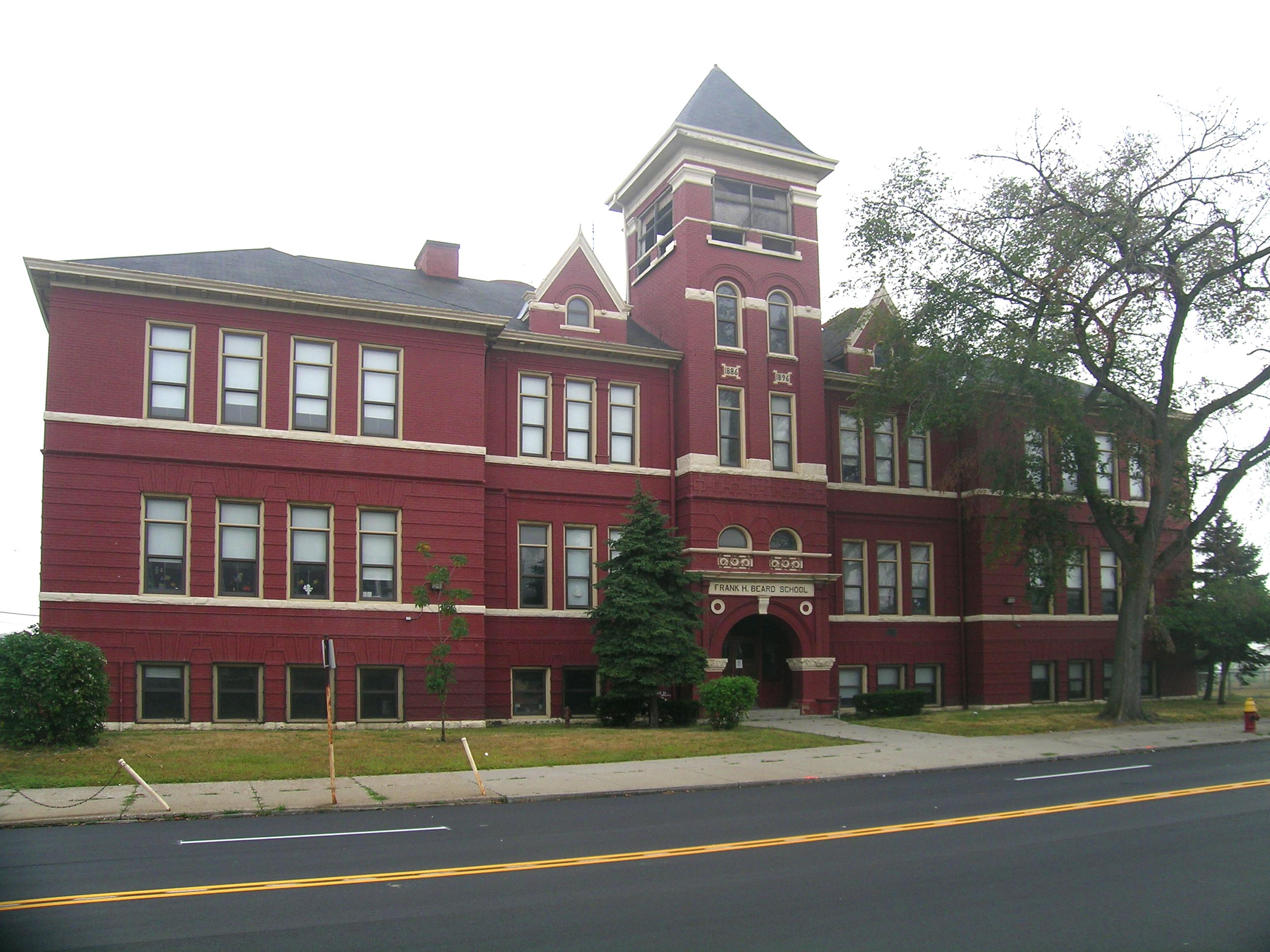
- Interactive map
- Location: 840 Waterman Street; Detroit, Michigan
- Coordinates: 42°18′23″N 83°06′33″W
- Built: 1896
- Architect: Malcomson and Higginbotham
- Architectural style: Late Victorian
- Demolished: 2022
- NRHP reference No.: 84001857

Significant dates
- Added to NRHP: January 26, 1984
- Designated MSHS: March 20, 1974

The James A. Garfield School was a former school building located at 840 Waterman Street in Detroit, Michigan. It is also known as the Frank H. Beard School. It was one of the oldest existing schools in the city of Detroit, as well as one of the least altered. The school was listed on the National Register of Historic Places and designated a Michigan State Historic Site in 1984, but caught fire and was demolished in 2022.

== History ==
In 1885, a section of Springwells Township was annexed to the city of Detroit. This section included two elementary schools, requiring the township to construct a new school for the remaining population. In 1886 a four-room schoolhouse was constructed at this site and named for president James A. Garfield. The surrounding area was booming, however, and by 1895 the original school was overcrowded. In 1896 it was torn down, and a new Garfield School, designed by Malcomson and Higginbotham, was constructed. An addition was constructed in 1900. In 1907, the Springwells School District merged with the schools of Detroit. After the merger, the city found that there were now two James A. Garfield Schools in the district, and name of the building was changed to honor Frank H. Beard, the director of the Springwells school board for 17 years. Beard Elementary School moved to a different address and by 2004 became Roberto Clemente Learning Academy.

As the neighborhood changed, enrollment declined. By 2008, the building housed the Beard Early Childhood Center. The school closed permanently in 2014.

In the early morning hours of July 27, 2022, the building caught fire and sustained considerable damage. The remainder of the school was demolished in October.

== Description ==
The brick school was built in the Victorian Romanesque style. The symmetrical front façade was organized into five bays, with the central and end bays projecting outward and the other two receding. The entrances were topped with semi-circular arches, and the structure boasted a variety of window shapes and sizes. The elaborate brickwork, multi-planed roofline, and the red brick tower conveyed the importance the community attached to public education. An addition to the original school was built in 1900.
