= Amy Hayes (announcer) =

American ring announcer and model (born 1973)

- Born: November 24, 1973 (age 52); Wyandotte, Michigan, U.S.
- Other name: "Lady of the Ring"
- Occupation: Ring announcer
- Years active: 2001–present
- Known for: "First Female Ring Announcer"
- Website: amyhayes.com

Amy Hayes (born November 24, 1973) is an American ring announcer and model. She is a regular aunnancer on Fox Sports Net, and in 2001 was the exclusive ring announcer on Fox Sport's networks "Sunday Night Fights" series under promoter Dan Goossen.

== Career ==
She is a former regular on ESPN2's Friday Night Fights, and Showtime. In 2001, Hayes signed a five-year deal with Fox Sports News to do ring announcing.

She has also been featured on Best Damn Sports Show Period. Hayes was asked to announce the very first episode of ShoBox: The New Generation on Showtime.
