= Dresden Codak =

Science fiction webcomic by Senna Diaz

- Blank cover of the complementary 2010 sketchbook, by Senna Diaz
- Author: A. Senna Diaz
- Website: http://dresdencodak.com/
- Current status/schedule: Every 2–4 weeks (as of late 2022)
- Launch date: June 8th, 2005
- Genre(s): Science fiction, philosophy, humour, Decopunk

Dresden Codak is a webcomic written and illustrated by A. Senna Diaz. Described by Diaz as a "celebration of science, death and human folly", the comic presents stories that deal with elements of philosophy, science and technology, and/or psychology. The comic was recognized in 2008 at the Web Cartoonists' Choice Awards for Outstanding Use of Color and Outstanding Use of The Medium.

On October 22, 2008, Dresden Codak concluded a long-running sequence called "Hob", which focused on the character Kimiko's discovery of a post-Singularity robot and its attempted recovery by people from a future in which Earth was destroyed in a war with the artificial intelligence that once tended the planet.

On February 25, 2013, Senna Diaz launched a Kickstarter campaign to raise funds for a hard cover book edition of the webcomic. Dubbed The Tomorrow Girl: Dresden Codak Volume 1, it collected the first 5 years of the webcomic plus additional art and reformatted everything to fit printed media. The campaign reached its original goal of $30,000 in less than 24 hours and ended with a total of $534,994.

== Subject matter ==
Dresden Codak's second longest-running story arc, HOB, focused primarily on the results of a technological singularity and the consequences of time travel. Accordingly, much of Dresden Codak falls into the cyberpunk and science fiction genres.

The current and longest-running major story arc is Dark Science. The arc centers on Kimiko Ross, while introducing a few new characters. The arc also utilises to great effect the artistic style of decopunk, which, though notably present in the HOB arc, defines the city of Nephilopolis.

== Major characters ==
=== Dark Science arc ===
Kimiko as a child

- Kimiko Ross (given name Kimiko Sarai Kusanagi, middle name later given as Serena) is Dresden Codak's main character. Her uncompromising devotion to science leads her into social and militaristic conflicts throughout the comic, but also provides much of the genesis for each plot arc. The comic "Mother" alludes to Kimiko's mother's death as the reason for her resistance towards anything that would impede the progress of science or technology. At the end of the "Hob" storyline Kim was badly wounded, losing both legs, her left arm and her left eye. Following these events she uses cybernetic replacements of her own design, which she frequently adjusts and upgrades.
- Melchior – a rogue agent of Department of Opposition.
- Lilith – a twin of Asmodea.
- Xiaoling Chavez – a cyborg woman, a warrior, a former leader of a gang of cyborgs.
- Yvonne “Vonnie” Awning – a former lead of a fashionable magazine, now Leviathan and a head of dept. of Inquisition. Kimiko's best friend.

=== HOB arc ===
- Kimiko Ross
- Dimitri and Alina Tokamak are two of Kimiko's close Russian friends. They are shown to have impressive superpowers and Diaz describes the two of them as "probably Nuclear-Powered", a reference to the Tokamak nuclear fusion reactor that is their namesake.
- Tiny Carl Jung is a tiny version of Carl Jung, "one of the fathers of modern tiny psychology". He seems to live with Kimiko, or at least to associate with Kimiko and the Tokamak siblings closely.
- Rupert and Hubert are a pair of Victorian intellectuals who have moved to a magical palace on the moon to escape the insincerity of the world's leaders. They are less frequently recurring than the staple characters of the comic, and spend their time discussing scientific issues in the surreal manner typical of the comic. They do not interact with the other characters.

== Reception ==
The Perry Bible Fellowship creator Nicholas Gurewitch wrote that he enjoyed reading Dresden Codak. The comic's highbrow patter is distinctive yet not based in realistic physical medium: in Wired, internet pundit Lore Sjöberg described it as "Little Nemo in Higher Education Land", while the pseudo-Victorian pseudoscience of "Traversing the Luminiferous Aether with Rupert and Hubert" was featured in the "Daily Zeitgeist" section of science magazine Seed.

=== Web Cartoonists' Choice Awards ===
- 2008 Web Cartoonists' Choice Awards Winner for multiple awards:
  - Outstanding Use of Color
  - Outstanding in a field
- 2008 Web Cartoonists' Choice Awards Nominee for multiple awards:
  - Outstanding Artist
  - Outstanding Layout
  - Outstanding Environment Design
- 2007 Web Cartoonists' Choice Awards Nominee for Outstanding Layout.
