= Wyandotte, Michigan =

- City
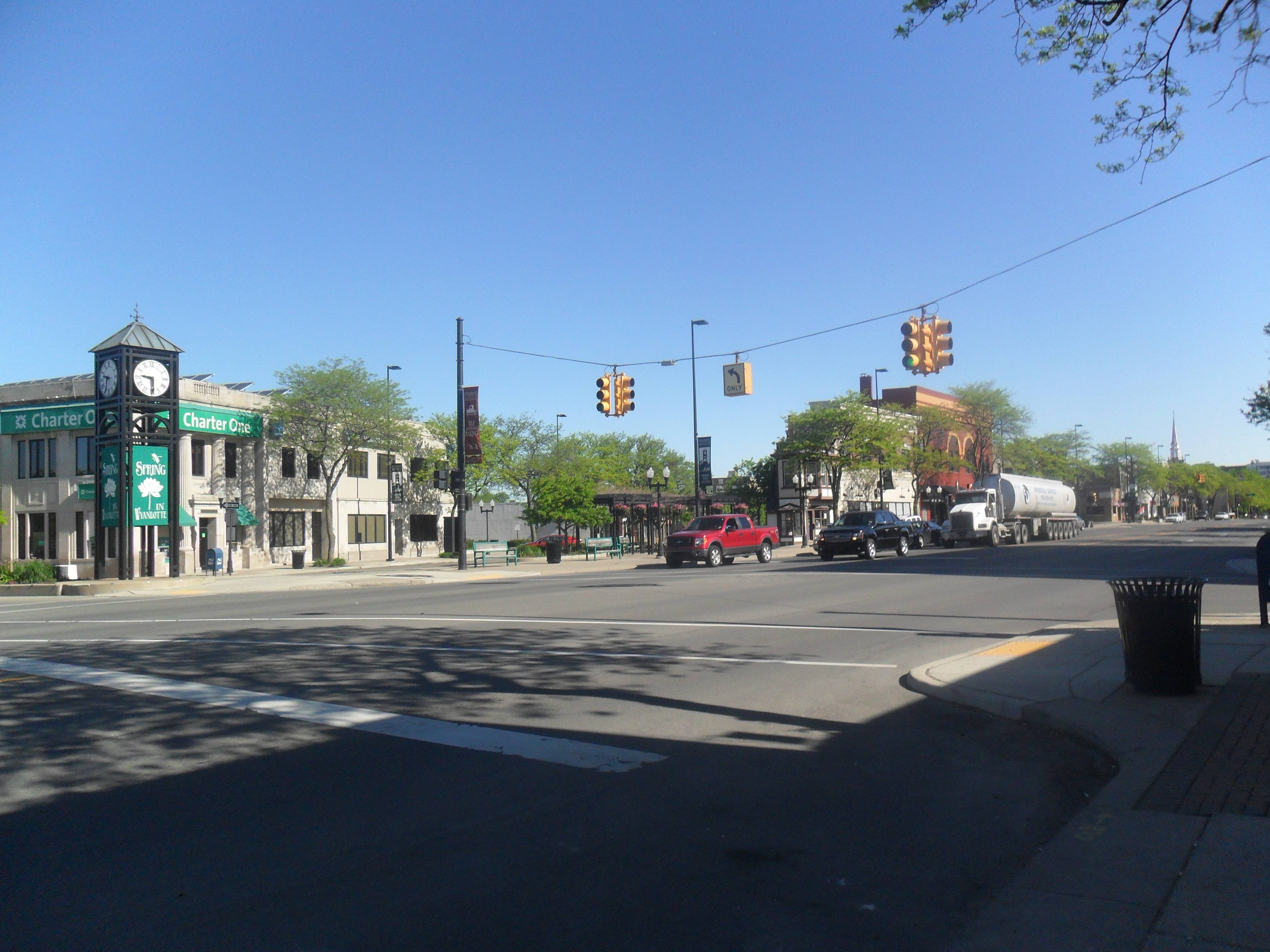
- Downtown Wyandotte along Biddle Avenue

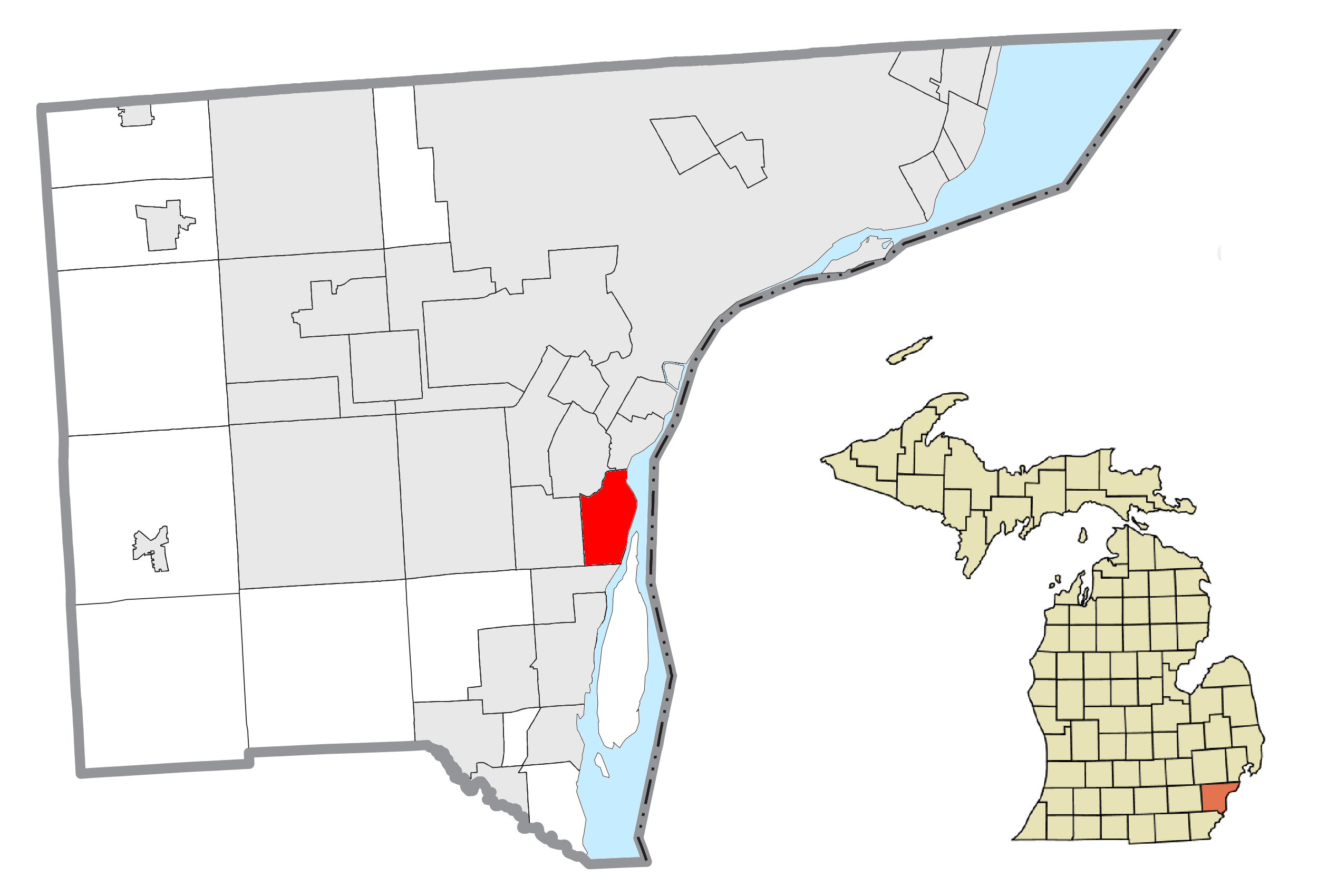
- Location within Wayne County

- Location within the state of Michigan Location within the United States
- Coordinates: 42°12′31″N 83°09′45″W
- Country: United States
- State: Michigan
- County: Wayne
- Founded: 1854
- Incorporated: 1867

Government
  - Type: Mayor–council
  - Mayor: Robert DeSana
  - Clerk: Lawrence Stec
  - City council: Members: Kelly Stec (Mayor Pro Tempore); Todd Hanna; Rosemary Shuryan; Chris Calvin (D); Kaylyn Crayne; Robert Alderman

Area
  - City: 6.98 sq mi (18.08 km^{2})
  - Land: 5.29 sq mi (13.71 km^{2})
  - Water: 1.69 sq mi (4.37 km^{2})
- Elevation: 581 ft (177 m)

Population (2020)
  - City: 25,058
  - Estimate (2019): 24,859
  - Density: 4,697.2/sq mi (1,813.61/km^{2})
  - Metro: 4,285,832 (Metro Detroit)
- Time zone: UTC-5 (EST)
  - Summer (DST): UTC-4 (EDT)
- ZIP code(s): 48192
- Area code: 734
- FIPS code: 26-88900
- GNIS feature ID: 1616849
- Website: www.wyandottemi.gov

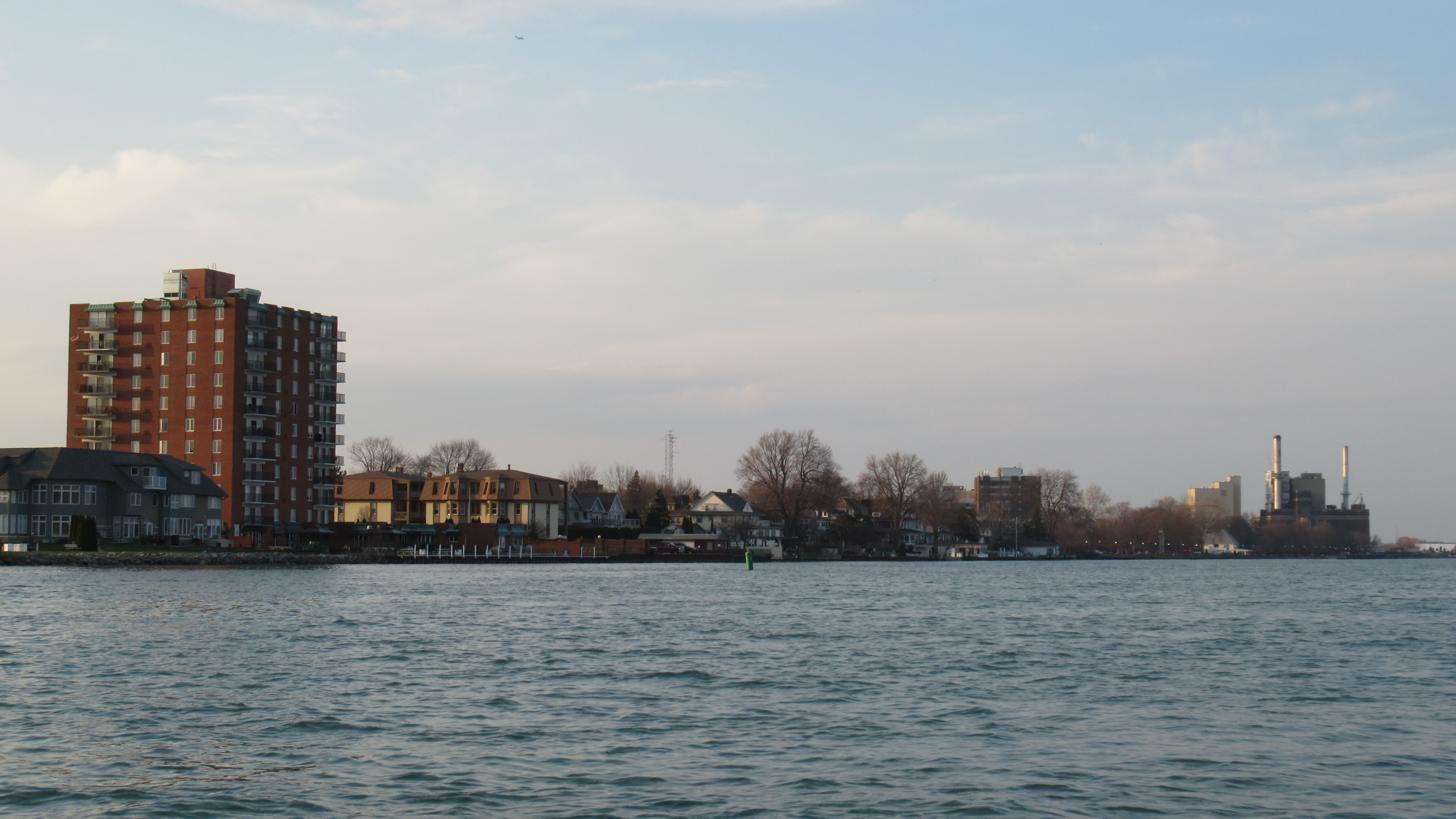
Wyandotte riverfront looking north along the Detroit River

Wyandotte (/ˈwaɪəndɒt/ WY-ən-dot) is a city in Wayne County in the U.S. state of Michigan. A Downriver suburb of Detroit, Wyandotte is located roughly 14 miles (22.5 km) southwest of downtown Detroit. As of the 2020 census, the city had a population of 25,058.

== History ==
=== 18th century ===
In the 18th century, this area was a small village of the Wyandot (or Wendat) called Maquaqua. Local French colonists called it Monguagon, a transliteration of its pronunciation in French.

The Wyandot were Iroquoian-speaking and part of the Huron nation from the Georgian Bay area of Canada. They generally lived peacefully with the few white French farmers, exchanging products and favors.

During the French and Indian War (part of the Seven Years' War in Europe), the Wyandot were allied with the Potawatomi and the French. English had taken control of the garrisoned Fort of Detroit. Near here, Chief Pontiac plotted his attack against the British fort in 1763 but failed.

The center of the village was nearly parallel to Biddle Avenue between Oak Street and Eureka Road near the river and its sandy beach, which was a welcome feature to the local tribesmen, as their main mode of transportation to the fort in Detroit was by birch bark canoe. The tribe was considered peaceable and friendly with the British, the remaining French in the area, and the newly arrived Americans.

=== 19th century ===
In 1818, after the United States had gained independence and then control over this area from the British, the Wyandot signed a treaty with the U.S. government ceding this land. Some Wyandot moved to an area near Flat Rock, Michigan, then to Ohio, and Indian Territory, in Kansas and finally Oklahoma.

Most of the Wyandot moved across the Detroit River to Canada and what is now Anderdon, Windsor, Ontario. Many of their descendants live there today. The name somewhat lives on as Wyandotte County, Kansas.

The Anglo-Americans later credited Major John Biddle as the first white settler in Wyandotte, but French colonists had lived in the area for more than a century before he settled there.

After the War of 1812 and the Wyandot cession, Major Biddle purchased 2,200 acres (9 km^{2}) of land from the federal government in 1818. He developed a farm and a summer estate. The buildings were completed around 1835, and he named his estate "Wyandotte" after the Indians who were still living in the area.

John S. Van Alstyne, general manager for Eber Ward of both the Eureka Iron & Steel Works and the associated Wyandotte Rolling Mills, laid out the master plan for the city. This plan was frequently called the "Philadelphia Plan", as streets were laid out on a north–south and east–west grid, similar to those in Philadelphia, Pennsylvania. That plan was made by colonial founder William Penn.

In Wyandotte, the focal point was the Detroit River, and the first street parallel became Front Street. This street was eventually extended and renamed Van Alstyne Boulevard in 1921. Streets running parallel to Front Street were named according to numbers, from First to the extent of the territory involved. Streets running horizontal to the numbered streets were named for trees and plants.

Founded as a village of Ecorse Township in 1854, Wyandotte was incorporated as a city, and granted a charter by the State of Michigan, on December 12, 1866. It held its first city election in April 1867, making it the oldest incorporated city in Wayne County after Detroit. On April 8, 1867, the Village of Wyandotte was incorporated as a home rule city.

=== 20th century ===
A community named New Jerusalem, consisting of immigrants from multiple nations, was founded nearby in the 1890s. It has since been absorbed by Wyandotte. It was incorporated as a village with the name of Glenwood in 1900. In 1901 a post office was established here with the name of Bacon since there was already a Glenwood post office in Wayne Township, Cass County, Michigan. Wyandotte annexed the community in 1905.

The community of Ford City was founded as a village in 1902. It was named for John B. Ford who ran the Michigan Alkali Company there. In 1922 it merged with Wyandotte. On April 14, 1924, Wyandotte annexed a large section of Ecorse Township.

Since settlement by eastern Americans, Wyandotte has been influenced by immigrants from many nations. Ethnic German, Polish, Irish and Italian communities have contributed much from their cultures. The city attracted African Americans for industrial jobs, but had a discriminatory past as a sundown town. It refused to allow them as residents.

== Geography ==
According to the United States Census Bureau, the city has a total area of 7.01 square miles (18.16 km^{2}), of which 5.27 square miles (13.65 km^{2}) is land and 1.74 square miles (4.51 km^{2}) is water.

The city is 10 miles (16 km) southwest of Downtown Detroit. The Detroit River forms the eastern boundary of the city, and the uninhabited Grassy Island is administered by the city. The Ecorse River also forms a small northern boundary of the city.

== Business and industry ==
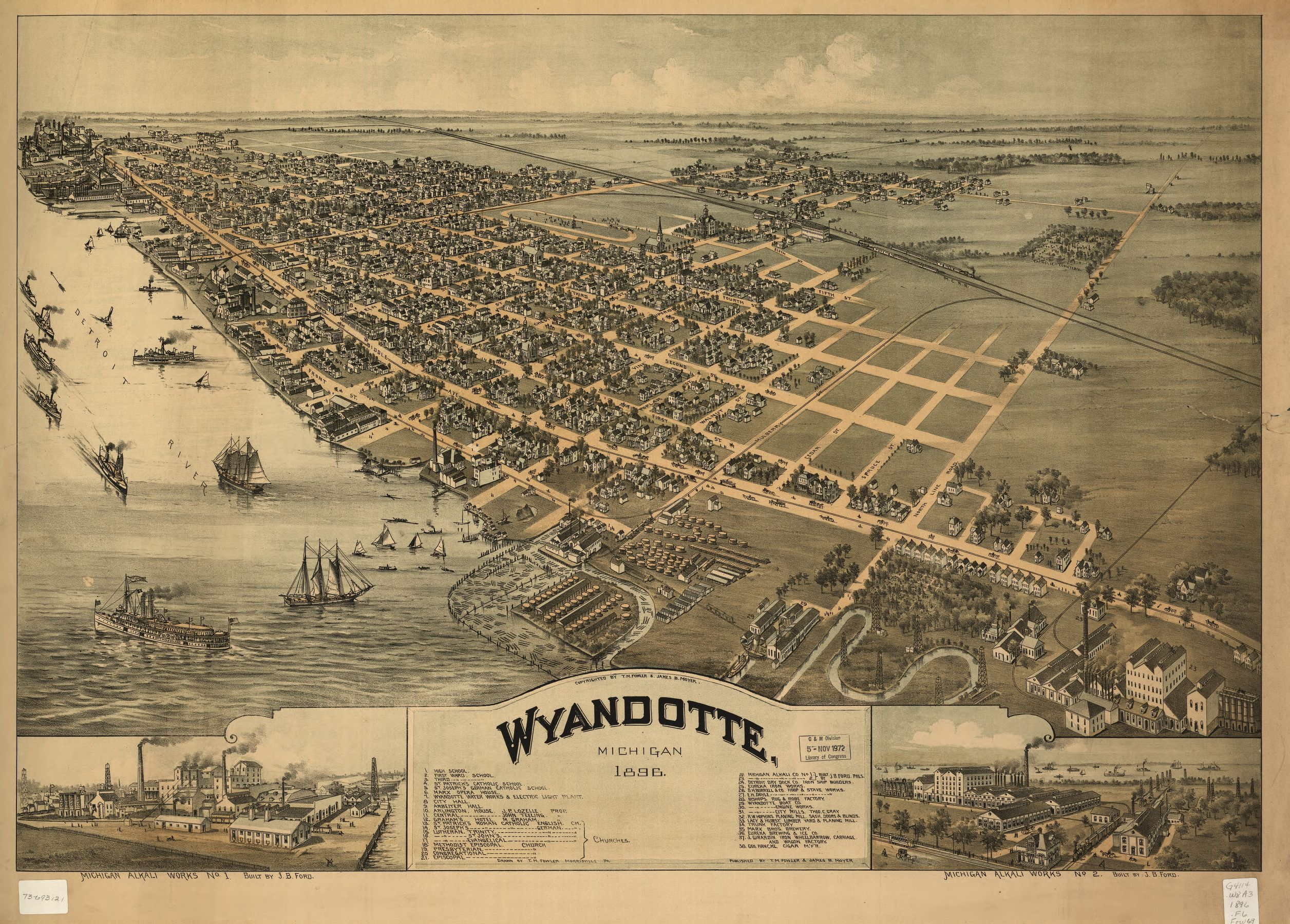
Wyandotte in 1896

An early figure was Captain John Baptiste Ford, who used the salt to create soda ash, which in turn was used to create plate glass. In 1893, he created Michigan Alkali Company, which created baking soda, soda ash and lye. The company, later renamed Wyandotte Chemicals Co., went on to create a variety of soaps and cleaners, eventually becoming part of BASF and expanding into the BASF industrial complex.

Ward also help create Wyandotte's shipbuilding role, which existed from the 1870s into the 1920s. During that time, a wide variety of boats were created along Wyandotte's riverbank, from steamers and tugs to huge ferries. In 1873, Ward's Wyandotte Iron Ship Building Works built the nation's earliest steel-hulled vessel, a tugboat called the Sport. This shipbuilding industry was immortalized in 1942 in the painting of several murals which still exist today in the auditorium of Theodore Roosevelt High School.

Beginning in the 1920s Wyandotte was a major source of toy production, with the All Metal Products Company founded in 1920 and located in Wyandotte on Sycamore Street between 14th and 15th streets. From the 1920s until the 1950s the company, under the name "Wyandotte Toys", was the largest manufacturer of toy guns and pistols in the US, producing a wide variety of pop guns, clicker pistols, dart guns, cap guns and a variety of plastic pistols. The company also produced a wide range of toy airplanes and other vehicles by pressing scrap metal obtained from local automobile factories. The company's motto was "Wyandotte Toys Are Good and Safe." In the early 1950s the company moved to Ohio, and it was bought out by Louis Marx and Company three years later.

Bishop Park, located on the riverfront north of downtown, once had a dock to board the Boblo Boat ferry to Boblo Island.

Today, much of the remaining industry is minor, with a notable exception being BASF Wyandotte on the city's north riverfront.

In July 2001, three workers at an Atofina plant in neighboring Riverview were killed when a rail car leaked a colorless gas called methyl mercaptan. The gas exploded into flames and led to the emergency evacuation of 3,100 area residents, including some Wyandotte citizens.

The city is served by three newspapers: the regional Detroit Free Press and The Detroit News; as well as The News-Herald, which is a more local paper serving the Downriver communities and has roots tracing back to two former newspapers that were published in Wyandotte. Wyandotte is also in the Detroit radio and television markets.

== Government and municipal services ==
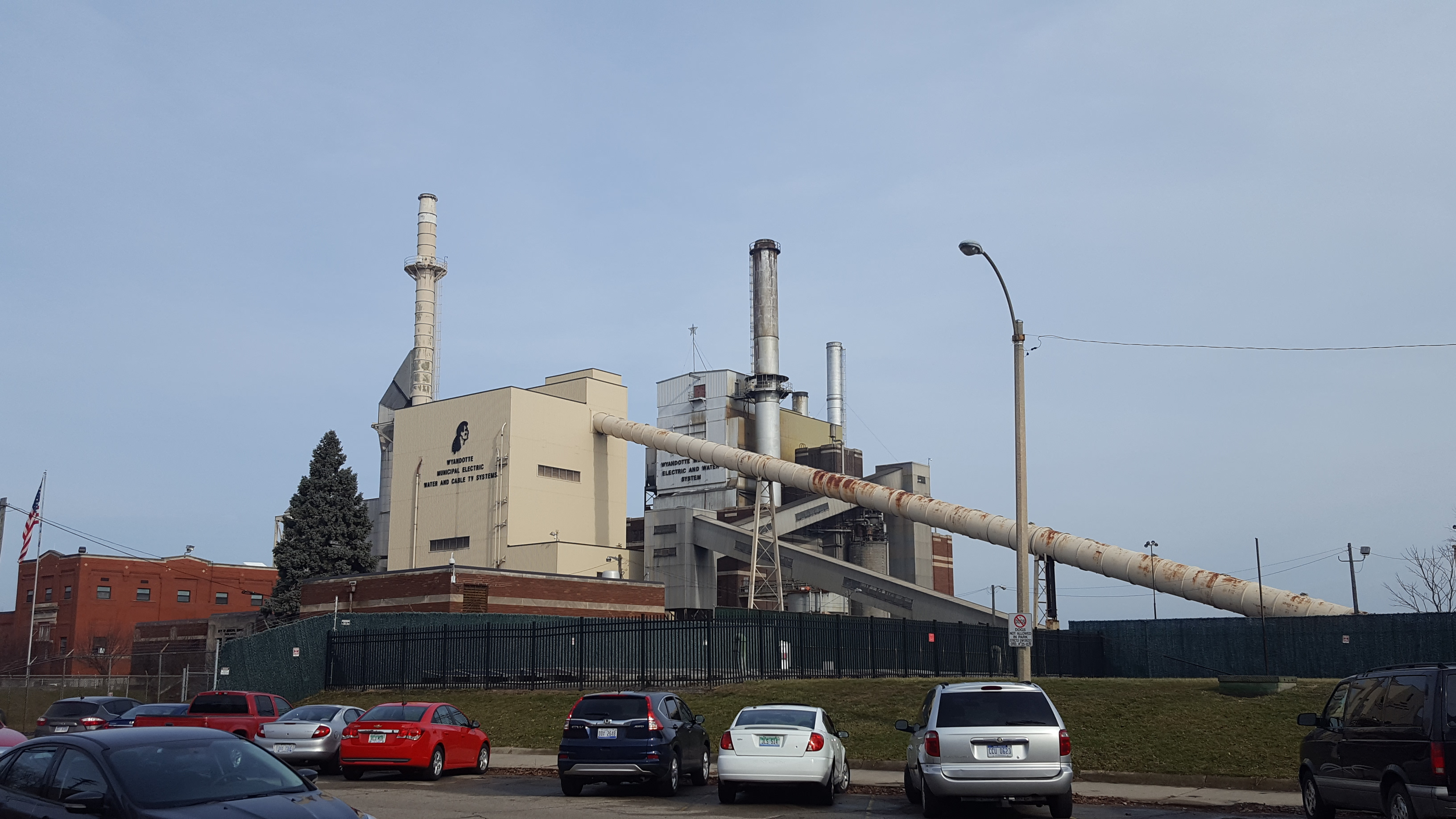
Wyandotte Power Plant

The mayor and City Council and other elected officials oversee the community's governance. Wyandotte has its own community-owned municipal services, Wyandotte Municipal Services, which provides electricity from a municipal power plant, and operates city-owned water and cable television services.

The Wyandotte Police Department, like that of its fellow Downriver community Woodhaven, has a Police Explorers post for youths ages 14–21 that have an interest in law enforcement.

Wyandotte's community is served by the Bacon Memorial District Library, a member of the tri-county library system The Library Network. Built out of the Ford-Bacon House on Vinewood Street, it replaced the Wyandotte Carnegie Library in 1942; following the death of Congressman Mark R. Bacon, his widow Mary Ford-Bacon deeded the building to the city. The staff offer guided tours through the historic part of the building.

Wyandotte is a sister city to Komaki, Japan. Each year delegates from Komaki come to Wyandotte to tour the city.

== Education ==
=== Public schools ===
Wyandotte Public Schools operates the city's public schools. Since 1901, all schools are named for former US presidents.

- Elementary and middle schools include:
  - Garfield Elementary School, built in 1932
  - James Monroe Elementary School, built in 1954
  - George Washington Elementary School, built in the 1929
  - Thomas Jefferson Elementary School, built in 1950
- Middle schools include:
  - Woodrow Wilson Middle School, built in 1956

Wyandotte's public high school is Theodore Roosevelt High School, which began construction in 1921, was completed in 1923, and has since been expanded four times.

=== Catholic schools ===
Currently there are no Catholic schools open in Wyandotte. These are the schools that were formerly open: Our Lady of Mount Carmel Elementary and High School, St. Stanislaus Kostka Elementary School, St. Patrick Elementary and High School, St, Elizabeth Elementary School, St. Joseph Elementary School, and St. Helena Elementary School; also, Wyandotte Catholic Consolidated School (After the consolidation of Sts. Elizabeth, Patrick, and Joseph) were previously in the community. They were a part of the Roman Catholic Archdiocese of Detroit.

Wyandotte Consolidated formed in 1970 from the merger of St. Elizabeth, St. Joseph, and St. Patrick Schools. It closed in 2011 after a downturn in the economy.

== Sports and recreation ==
The city is home to the Wyandotte Boat Club, a rowing facility. The club host to three local regattas: two spring high school regattas and one fall club regatta. The new facility features two indoor rowing tanks, numerous shell racks and shells, erg and weight rooms, men's and women's locker rooms, meeting room, and a massive club/bar overlooking the Detroit River. The tanks are used by all of the rowing programs for technique and style training. They have been shown to be of great benefit in the training of novice rowers. During the off season, the tanks are rented by the hour to outside schools and universities. The city has 23 parks in total with the largest being Bishop Park. Pets, bikes and alcohol are prohibited in all Wyandotte city parks. Rollerblades and skateboards are prohibited in all areas except the Wyandotte Skate Park.

Wyandotte was home to minor league baseball. In 1912 and 1913, the Wyandotte Alkalis, named for the Michigan Alkali Company, played as members of the Class D level Border League, winning the 1912 league championship. Wyandotte hosted home minor league games at Alkali Park.

=== F.O.P. Park ===
Located at the corner of Bondie and 8th Streets, the F.O.P. Park has a large shaded playground and covered pavilion for picnicking. Sports facilities include a basketball court, baseball diamond and two horseshoe pits. The park has a 66% satisfaction rating out of 45 people surveyed.

F.O.P. Park holds youth baseball and softball games during day and night for the Wyandotte Braves Association.

=== Kiwanis Park ===
Kiwanis Park is named in honor of the Kiwanis Club of Wyandotte, which is the town's oldest civic non-profit organization. The Kiwanis Club continues to make an annual contribution to the upkeep of the park. The park is located at the intersection of 6th Street and North Drive. The park is located on the site of the North Drive Dump which was remediated by the US EPA through the 1990s as the Lower Ecorse Creek Superfund Site. The site was successfully remediated by 2003 before the park was built on the site.

=== Lions Club Park ===
The Lions Club Park is located at the intersection of Vinewood and 9th Avenue next to Our Lady of the Scapular Religious Education Office. It was first opened on August 12, 2009, by the Lions Club. The park is completely enclosed with fences and has benches situated all around it. There is a large playscape and climbing terrace. The hours are 6:00 am to 10:00 pm, year round.

=== Oak Club Park ===
The Oak Club Park is at the corner of 20th Street and Vinewood. It has a large shaded area, a playground and basketball court. A small picnic area, water fountain and pavilion are located in the park, which is open from 6am to 10pm year round. The park's name was changed to "American Legion Edward C. Headman Post 217 Park" in 2022.

=== Pulaski Park ===
Pulaski Park is at the corner of 12 Street and Oxford Court. It hosts multiple softball and baseball fields, two basketball courts, and four tennis courts. Hours are 6:00 am to 10:00 pm, year round.

The Park is named in honor of Count Casimir Pulaski, a statue of whom was dedicated in the park in 1938.

=== V.F.W Playfield ===
V.F.W Playfield is a moderate sized park located at the corner of 11th and Cherry. It has a baseball diamond, a very large open field, swings, and a playscape. There is also a covered pavilion. It is located next to Silver Lining Tire Recycling. The hours are 6:00 am to 10:00 pm, year round. Pets, bikes, skateboards and rollerblades are not permitted in the park. Alcohol is not permitted in the park. It is owned by the Veterans Of Foreign Wars, (V.F.W), in Wyandotte.

=== WAA Park ===
A smaller park located on Highland and Alfred street in the north end of Wyandotte, it has a playground and swing sets, an open play space for sports and other activities. There is a covered pavilion and benches and a sand pit. It is owned by the Wyandotte Athletic Association. The hours are 6:00 am to 10:00 pm, year round.

== Transportation ==
=== Public transportation ===
Two Suburban Mobility Authority for Regional Transportation bus routes pass through the city of Wyandotte. Fort Street north of Eureka Road is served seven days a week by route 125, which connects Detroit Metropolitan Airport and River Rouge. Biddle Avenue, Eureka Road, and Fort Street south of Eureka Road are served on weekdays by route 140, which extends north to the John D. Dingell Transit Center in Dearborn.

=== Highways ===
- M-85, known locally as Fort Street, runs south–north and forms most of the westernmost boundary of the city.

=== Rail ===
The Canadian National Railway (through its Grand Trunk Western Railroad subsidiary) Shore Line and Flat Rock subdivisions and the Conrail Shared Assets Detroit Line (also used by Norfolk Southern Railway trains) parallel each other through the city of Wyandotte, connecting Detroit and Toledo, Ohio.

== Demographics ==
Historical population
Census	Pop.	Note	%±
1870	2,731		—
1880	3,631		33.0%
1890	3,817		5.1%
1900	5,183		35.8%
1910	8,287		59.9%
1920	13,851		67.1%
1930	28,368		104.8%
1940	30,618		7.9%
1950	36,846		20.3%
1960	43,519		18.1%
1970	41,061		−5.6%
1980	34,006		−17.2%
1990	30,938		−9.0%
2000	28,006		−9.5%
2010	25,883		−7.6%
2020	25,058		−3.2%
U.S. Decennial Census

=== Racial and ethnic composition ===
Wyandotte city, Michigan – Racial and ethnic composition Note: the US Census treats Hispanic/Latino as an ethnic category. This table excludes Latinos from the racial categories and assigns them to a separate category. Hispanics/Latinos may be of any race.
Race / Ethnicity (NH = Non-Hispanic)	Pop 2000	Pop 2010	Pop 2020	% 2000	% 2010	% 2020
White alone (NH)	26,421	23,562	21,342	94.34%	91.03%	85.17%
Black or African American alone (NH)	144	327	467	0.51%	1.26%	1.86%
Native American or Alaska Native alone (NH)	121	146	87	0.43%	0.56%	0.35%
Asian alone (NH)	91	129	128	0.32%	0.50%	0.51%
Native Hawaiian or Pacific Islander alone (NH)	6	6	7	0.02%	0.02%	0.03%
Other race alone (NH)	19	15	79	0.07%	0.06%	0.32%
Mixed race or Multiracial (NH)	388	386	1,157	1.39%	1.49%	4.62%
Hispanic or Latino (any race)	816	1,312	1,791	2.91%	5.07%	7.15%
Total	28,006	25,883	25,058	100.00%	100.00%	100.00%

=== 2020 census ===
As of the 2020 census, Wyandotte had a population of 25,058. The median age was 42.0 years. 18.6% of residents were under the age of 18 and 17.6% of residents were 65 years of age or older. For every 100 females there were 97.3 males, and for every 100 females age 18 and over there were 95.4 males age 18 and over.

100.0% of residents lived in urban areas, while 0.0% lived in rural areas.

There were 11,260 households in Wyandotte, of which 23.5% had children under the age of 18 living in them. Of all households, 37.9% were married-couple households, 23.4% were households with a male householder and no spouse or partner present, and 30.5% were households with a female householder and no spouse or partner present. About 36.0% of all households were made up of individuals and 14.1% had someone living alone who was 65 years of age or older.

There were 11,872 housing units, of which 5.2% were vacant. The homeowner vacancy rate was 1.0% and the rental vacancy rate was 5.2%.

Racial composition as of the 2020 census
Race	Number	Percent
White	22,015	87.9%
Black or African American	494	2.0%
American Indian and Alaska Native	133	0.5%
Asian	135	0.5%
Native Hawaiian and Other Pacific Islander	9	0.0%
Some other race	415	1.7%
Two or more races	1,857	7.4%

=== 2010 census ===
As of the census of 2010, there were 25,883 people, 10,991 households, and 6,727 families residing in the city. The population density was 4,911.4 inhabitants per square mile (1,896.3/km^{2}). There were 12,081 housing units at an average density of 2,292.4 per square mile (885.1/km^{2}). The racial makeup of the city was 94.7% White, 1.3% African American, 0.7% Native American, 0.5% Asian, 0.9% from other races, and 1.9% from two or more races. Hispanic or Latino of any race were 5.1% of the population.

There were 10,991 households, of which 28.4% had children under the age of 18 living with them, 42.6% were married couples living together, 13.2% had a female householder with no husband present, 5.4% had a male householder with no wife present, and 38.8% were non-families. 33.0% of all households were made up of individuals, and 12.8% had someone living alone who was 65 years of age or older. The average household size was 2.35 and the average family size was 2.99.

The median age in the city was 40.4 years. 21.4% of residents were under the age of 18; 8.5% were between the ages of 18 and 24; 26.4% were from 25 to 44; 29.9% were from 45 to 64; and 13.8% were 65 years of age or older. The gender makeup of the city was 48.9% male and 51.1% female.

=== 2000 census ===
As of the census of 2000, there were 28,006 people, 11,816 households, and 7,420 families residing in the city. The population density was 5,278.1 inhabitants per square mile (2,037.9/km^{2}). There were 12,303 housing units at an average density of 2,318.7 per square mile (895.3/km^{2}). The racial makeup of the city was 96.32% White, 0.52% African American, 0.49% Native American, 0.33% Asian, 0.03% Pacific Islander, 0.72% from other races, and 1.59% from two or more races. Hispanic or Latino of any race were 2.91% of the population.

There were 11,816 households, out of which 27.7% had children under the age of 18 living with them, 46.3% were married couples living together, 11.9% had a female householder with no husband present, and 37.2% were non-families. 31.9% of all households were made up of individuals, and 13.3% had someone living alone who was 65 years of age or older. The average household size was 2.36 and the average family size was 2.99.

In the city, the population was spread out, with 22.6% under the age of 18, 8.3% from 18 to 24, 31.6% from 25 to 44, 21.7% from 45 to 64, and 15.7% who were 65 years of age or older. The median age was 38 years. For every 100 females, there were 96.0 males. For every 100 females age 18 and over, there were 93.5 males.

As of 2000, residents were predominantly of Polish descent, with the following ancestry distribution: Polish (22.5%), German (21.9%), Irish (17.5%), English (9.0%), French (8.5%), Italian (8.4%).

The median income for a household in the city was $43,740, and the median income for a family was $54,106. Males had a median income of $42,469 versus $27,261 for females. The per capita income for the city was $22,185. About 4.7% of families and 6.2% of the population were below the poverty line, including 8.7% of those under age 18 and 4.0% of those age 65 or over.

== Notable people ==
- Amy Faye Hayes, ring announcer and model.
- Lucille Ball, actress who was raised in the city as a child
- Joe Carollo, tackle for Notre Dame and NFL's Los Angeles Rams
- Dick Dean, born Richard Dean Sawitskas, automobile designer and builder of custom cars
- Aaron Diaz, science popularizer and creator of the comic Dresden Codak
- Gwen Frostic, artist and author
- Justin Hicks, professional golfer
- Denise R. Johnson, first woman appointed to Vermont Supreme Court
- Jeff Kaiser, former pitcher for the Cleveland Indians.
- Connie Kreski, 1969 Playboy Playmate of the Year
- Bob Kuzava, baseball pitcher for New York Yankees in three World Series
- Bill Lajoie, general manager of 1984 World Series champion Detroit Tigers
- Budd Lynch, the Detroit Red Wings' public address announcer at Joe Louis Arena
- Lee Majors, actor most noted as The Six Million Dollar Man and The Fall Guy
- Gerald Mayhew, professional ice hockey player
- Ann Penelope Marston, archery champion and Miss America 1960 pageant contestant
- George E. Martin, US Army major general, raised and educated in Wyandotte
- John Martin, baseball pitcher for St. Louis Cardinals
- Thomas McGuane, novelist, screenwriter known for such works as Ninety-Two in the Shade and The Missouri Breaks, husband of actress Margot Kidder
- Ed Mierkowicz, baseball outfielder for Detroit Tigers in 1940s
- Jenny Romatowski, baseball player, All-American Girls Professional Baseball League
- Soony Saad, Lebanese-American professional soccer player
- John Schreiber, baseball pitcher for the Kansas City Royals
- Matt Shoemaker, baseball pitcher for Toronto Blue Jays
- Fritz Shurmur, football coach for five NFL teams
- Craig Titus, former IFBB bodybuilding champion and convicted murderer
- Louis A. Waldman, art historian specializing in Italian Renaissance

== See also ==
- List of sundown towns in the United States
