= List of Michigan State Historic Sites in Wayne County =

Location of Wayne County in Michigan

The following is a list of Michigan State Historic Sites in Wayne County, Michigan. Sites marked with a dagger (†) are also listed on the National Register of Historic Places in Wayne County, Michigan. Those with a double dagger (‡) are also designated National Historic Landmarks.

== Current listings ==
Name	Image	Location	City	Listing date
Grosse Pointe War Memorial†		32 Lake Shore Drive	Grosse Pointe Farms	February 18, 1982
Alpha Phi Alpha Fraternity House		293 Eliot	Detroit	August 30, 1977
American Academy of Pediatrics Informational Site		3990 John R Street	Detroit	July 29, 1980
American's First Bessemer Steel Mill		Northwest corner Van Alstyne Boulevard and Elm Street	Wyandotte	September 17, 1957
Amo-Juchartz House		434 Plum Street	Wyandotte	March 21, 1991
William Armstrong House		2234 Biddle Avenue	Wyandotte	March 21, 1991
Association of Food and Drug Officials Commemorative Designation		Washington Boulevard between Michigan and State Streets	Detroit	July 15, 1999
Assumption Roman Catholic Church†		13770 Gratiot Avenue	Detroit	July 19, 1990
Bagley Memorial Fountain†		Cadillac Square	Detroit	February 2, 1971
James A. Bailey Home Informational Site		1 Washington Boulevard	Detroit	January 19, 1978
Baker House†		233 South Main Street	Plymouth	January 8, 1981
Baker's Keyboard Lounge		20510 Livernois Avenue	Detroit	December 5, 1986
Battle of Bloody Run Informational Designation		3321 E Jefferson Ave	Detroit	August 23, 1956
Battle of Brownstown Informational Designation		Parsons Memorial Park, Elementary School, 14473 Middle Gibraltar Road	Gibraltar	September 25, 1956
Battle of Monguagon / Michigan Wyandot and Monguagon Informational Designation		Elizabeth Park, Slocum and West Jefferson avenues	Trenton	September 25, 1956
Belcrest Apartments†		5440 Cass Avenue	Detroit	November 30, 1983
Belle Isle†		Detroit River	Detroit	September 10, 1979
Bethel African Methodist Episcopal Church		5050 Saint Antoine	Detroit	April 4, 1975
Birthplace of Ford Automobile Informational Site		220 Bagley Street	Detroit	August 23, 1956
Birthplace of Model T Commemorative Designation		15050 Woodward Avenue, north side of Highland Park Ford Plant	Highland Park	April 17, 1956
Bishop's Residence		1880 Wellesley Drive	Detroit	March 15, 1990
Issac Boomer - Carl Haessler House		39 Massachusetts	Highland Park	February 25, 1988
Boston-Edison Historic District†		45 block area bounded by Linwood, Atkinson, Woodward and Glynn Court	Detroit	December 11, 1973
Boulevard Temple Methodist Episcopal Church		2567 West Grand Boulevard	Detroit	March 16, 1982
Brewster Homes Commemorative Designation		Corner of Mack Avenue and I-75	Detroit	June 15, 1995
Broadhead Armory†		7600 East Jefferson Avenue	Detroit	October 2, 1980
Colonel Thorton Fleming Brodhead's Office		20604 East River Road	Grosse Ile	January 19, 1978
Buick Motor Company Commemorative Designation		GM Headquarters, Renaissance Center, corner of Beaubien St and Jefferson Ave	Detroit	November 15, 2001
Ralph J. Bunche Birthplace Informational Site		Intersection of Fort and Junction streets	Detroit	February 11, 1972
Lee Burt House		420 Concord	Detroit	April 10, 1986
Canton Center School		1150 Canton Center Road	Canton	August 3, 1979
Cherry Hill School		50440 Cherry Hill Road	Canton	March 16, 1989
Cass Avenue Methodist Episcopal Church†		3901 Cass Avenue	Detroit	March 28, 1985
Cathedral Church of St. Paul Complex†		4800 Woodward Avenue	Detroit	August 3, 1982
Central United Methodist Church†		23 East Adams, at Woodward Avenue	Detroit	June 6, 1977
Central Woodward Christian Church†		9000 Woodward Avenue	Detroit	April 22, 1993
Chapoton House†		511 Beaubien	Detroit	April 21, 1980
Alexander Chene House† (demolished)		2681 E Jefferson Ave	Detroit	January 17, 1986
Cherry Hill United Methodist Church		321 Ridge Road	Canton Township	July 29, 1980
Chicago Road Informational Designation		Michigan and Washington Boulevard	Detroit	May 4, 1966
Chief Tonquish Informational Designation		34850 Fountain Boulevard	Westland	October 21, 1975
Children's Home of Detroit Informational Designation		900 Cook Road	Grosse Pointe Woods	May 21, 1985
Christ Church Chapel Complex†		61 Grosse Pointe Boulevard	Grosse Pointe Farms	September 24, 1992
Christ Church, Detroit†		960 East Jefferson Avenue	Detroit	November 6, 1970
Chrysler Corporation Informational Designation		12000 Oakland Avenue	Highland Park	May 4, 1966
Church of Annunciation Informational Designation		707 East Lafayette Boulevard	Detroit	January 18, 1980
Austin Church House		2156 West Jefferson	Trenton	January 27, 1983
Clay School†		453 Martin Luther King, Jr., Boulevard	Detroit	September 8, 1982
Lyman Cochrane House		216 Winder	Detroit	January 16, 1990
Commandant's Quarters†		21950 Michigan Avenue	Dearborn	August 23, 1956
Conant Gardens Informational Designation		NE corner of Conant & Nevada, 18000 Conant	Detroit	September 7, 1989
Cook School		20276 Mack Avenue	Grosse Pointe Woods	March 22, 1983
Cooper School Informational Site		28550 Ann Arbor Trail	Westland	July 21, 1988
Cornelius Henderson Informational Designation		Riverside Park; 3085 W. Jefferson Avenue	Detroit	May 7, 2024
Coronado Apartments†		3751-73 Second Avenue	Detroit	October 2, 1980
Charles G. Curtiss House†		168 Union Street	Plymouth	June 20, 1994
Dakota Inn Rathskeller		17324 John R	Detroit	June 30, 1988
George De Baptiste Home Informational Site		Southwest corner of East Larned and Beaubien streets	Detroit	April 4, 1975
Dearborn Hills Golf Club		3001 S Telegraph Road	Dearborn	February 16, 1989
Dearborn Inn and Colonial Homes†		20301 Oakwood Boulevard, NW of Rotunda Drive	Dearborn	February 10, 1983
Defer Elementary School†		15425 Kercheval	Grosse Pointe Park	May 29, 1996
Paul Harvey Deming House†		111 Lake Shore Road	Grosse Pointe Farms	October 17, 1996
Detroit and Pontiac Railway Terminal Informational Designation		Jefferson at Dequindre	Detroit	August 23, 1956
Detroit Association of Women's Clubs (also known as William Lennane House)		5461 Brush Street	Detroit	December 19, 1984
Detroit City Bank (Demolished)		134 W Jefferson Ave	Detroit	August 23, 1956
Detroit City Cemetery		Approx NW corner of Gunston and Hern streets, at the I-94 and Conner Street interchange	Detroit	January 27, 1983
Detroit College of Law Informational Designation (building demolished)		130 East Elizabeth Street	Detroit	April 18, 1983
Detroit Copper and Brass Rolling Mills		174 South Clark Street	Detroit	June 15, 1979
Detroit Cornice and Slate†		733 St. Antoine	Detroit	January 21, 1974
Detroit Edison Company Building		200 North Center Street	Northville	August 23, 1990
Detroit Free Press Building / The Free Press		321 West Lafayette Boulevard	Detroit	January 8, 1981
The Detroit Free Press Commemorative Designation		600 West Fort Street	Detroit	August 26, 1999
Detroit Institute of Technology		Corner of Temple and Second	Detroit	January 16, 1962
Detroit Masonic Temple†		500 Temple Avenue	Detroit	January 24, 1964
Detroit Medical College - Detroit College of Medicine Informational Site		3800 Woodward and Martin Place	Detroit	May 26, 1967
Detroit Museum of Art (Demolished)		Southwest corner of Jefferson Avenue and Hastings	Detroit	February 19, 1958
The Detroit News Informational Designation		615 West Lafayette Boulevard	Detroit	February 21, 1975
Detroit Plaindealer Informational Site		Southwest corner of Shelby and State	Detroit	November 14, 1974
Detroit Public Library - Redford Branch		21511 West McNichols	Detroit	July 26, 1978
Detroit River / Detroit River Recovery Informational Designation		5437 West Jefferson Avenue	Trenton	2007
Detroit Trust Company		201 West Fort Street	Detroit	October 21, 1975
Detroit Urban League Informational Designation		208 Mack Avenue	Detroit	March 2, 1976
Detroit's First Public School Informational Site		Woodbridge Street, near Shelby	Detroit	?
Dodge Brothers / Dodge Main Informational Designation		Veterans Park, Joseph Campau Avenue	Hamtramck	2007
Dodge Mansion (Demolished; NR delisted 11/30/77)		12 Lakeshore Drive	Grosse Pointe Farms	June 19, 1971
Frederick Douglass and John Brown Meeting Informational Site		633 East Congress, at St. Antoine	Detroit	December 5, 1961
Dunbar Hospital†		580 Frederick Street	Detroit	April 11, 1977
Early Detroit: 1701-1760 Informational Designation		151 Jefferson Avenue	Detroit	July 19, 1956
East Ferry Avenue Historic District†		East Ferry Ave. between Woodward and Beaubien	Detroit	December 14, 1976
East River Road Historic District†		East River Road	Grosse Ile	June 16, 1972
Eastern Liggett School / Detroit Waldorf School		2555 Burns Avenue	Detroit	2016
Eastern Market Historic District†		Bounded by Gratiot Avenue, Riopelle, Rivard, and Division streets	Detroit	July 26, 1974
Edgar-Hannan House		1020 Iroquois	Detroit	March 19, 1987
The Edison Institute‡		29000 Oakwood Boulevard	Dearborn	September 13, 1963
Eighteenth-Century Gristmill Informational Site		East River Road	Grosse Ile	March 23, 1962
Eighth Precinct Police Station†		4150 Grand River	Detroit	November 15, 1973
Spencer Eisenlord House		4139 Newberry	Wayne	March 6, 1997
Elmwood Cemetery		1200 Elmwood Avenue	Detroit	February 21, 1975
Engine House No. 11†		2737 Gratiot	Detroit	May 14, 1975
Joseph H. Esterling House		2245 Wabash	Detroit	March 16, 1982
Fair Lane Manor‡		4901 Evergreen Road	Dearborn	February 18, 1958
Farwell Building†		1249-1259 Griswold Street	Detroit	July 26, 1974
William Ferguson Informational Site		661 Alfred	Detroit	November 14, 1974
Finney Hotel/Underground Railway Informational Site		46 State Street, northeast corner of State and Griswold streets	Detroit	August 23, 1956
Fire of 1805			Detroit	August 23, 1956
First Christian Reformed Church of Detroit		1444 Maryland Avenue	Grosse Pointe Park	December 20, 1989
First Congregational Church of Detroit†		33 East Forest Street	Detroit	July 26, 1974
First Congregational Church		2 Towne Square Street	Wayne	April 15, 1999
First Detroit Public Library Commemorative Designation		Griswold and State streets	Detroit	January 24, 1964
First Jewish Religious Services Informational Designation		Corner of St. Antoine and East Congress	Detroit	April 1, 1977
First Michigan Colored Regiment Informational Site		Duffield School Ground, 2700 Clinton Street at Joseph Campau	Detroit	March 1, 1968
First Mile of Concrete Highway Informational Designation		Woodward Avenue (US-10) between Six and Seven Mile roads, in Palmer Park	Detroit	January 19, 1957
First Presbyterian Church†		2930 Woodward Avenue	Detroit	August 3, 1979
First Presbyterian Church of Northville Informational Site		200 East Main Street	Northville	May 18, 1989
First Unitarian Universalist Church†		4605 Cass Avenue	Detroit	December 14, 1976
First United States Troops in Detroit Informational Designation		Hart Plaza, Griswold at Jefferson Avenue	Detroit	August 23, 1956
Fisher Building‡		3011 W Grand Blvd	Detroit	October 21, 1975
John P. Fiske House		261-263 Edmund Place	Detroit	August 18, 1988
Ford Airport/William B. Stout Informational Site		20301 Oakwood Boulevard at Dearborn Inn	Dearborn	January 19, 1957
Ford Hunger March Informational Site		10520 W Fort St, at the Rouge River	Detroit	December 19, 1991
Ford Motor Company Informational Site		149 Griswold at Jefferson, Hart Plaza	Detroit	January 19, 1978
Ford Motor Company Lamp Factory		26601 W. Huron River Drive	Flat Rock	2008
Ford Piquette Plant‡		461 Piquette Avenue	Detroit	March 13, 2003
Ford Rouge Plant‡		3001 Miller Road	Dearborn	December 14, 1976
Ford Village Municipal Building (demolished)		994 Biddle Avenue	Wyandotte	December 20, 1989
Henry Ford Birthplace Informational Site		Ford and Greenfield roads	Dearborn	April 18, 1962
Henry Ford's Honeymoon House†		29835 Beechwood Avenue	Garden City	August 3, 1979
Henry Ford House		140 Edison Avenue	Detroit	July 17, 1986
Ford-Bacon House†		45 Vinewood	Wyandotte	February 19, 1987
Fordson High School		13800 Ford	Dearborn	April 9, 1998
Fort Lernoult Informational Designation		Fort and Shelby streets	Detroit	August 23, 1956
Fort Pontchartrain Informational Site		2 Washington Boulevard (Marker indoors)	Detroit	February 18, 1956
Fort Street Presbyterian Church†		631 West Fort Street	Detroit	March 3, 1971
Fort Wayne†		6325 West Jefferson Avenue	Detroit	February 19, 1958
Elizabeth Denison Forth Home Site		328 Macomb	Detroit	December 14, 1976
Fox Indian Massacre Informational Site		Corner of Lake Point and Windmill Point roads	Grosse Pointe Park	April 11, 1977
Fox Theater Building‡		2211 Woodward Avenue	Detroit	October 17, 1991
Charles Lang Freer House† / The Merrill-Palmer Institute		71 East Ferry Avenue	Detroit	November 6, 1970
French Landing Dam and Powerhouse		12100 Haggerty Road	Belleville	February 18, 1982
James A. Garfield School†		840 Waterman	Detroit	March 20, 1984
Gethsemane Evangelical Lutheran Church†		4461 Twenty-Eighth Street	Detroit	October 2, 1980
William and Amelia Kuehn Glinke House		434 Cherry Street	Wyandotte	May 30, 1996
Ziba B. Graham House		55 Peterboro	Detroit	December 15, 1988
Grand Riviera Theater - Demolished†		9222 Grand River Avenue	Detroit	October 2, 1980
U. S. Grant House		Northwest corner of Avenue "B" and International Grove	Detroit	August 23, 1956
Aaron Greeley/St. Cosme Line Road Informational Designation		Cunningham Park; 16850 Southfield Road	Allen Park	August 13, 1971
Grosse Ile Depot, Canada Southern / Michigan Central Railroad Depot		Parkway at East River Road	Grosse Ile	May 20, 1982
Grosse Ile Military Outpost Informational Site		East River Road	Grosse Ile	May 4, 1962
Grosse Pointe Academy†		171 Lake Shore Drive	Grosse Pointe Farms	April 15, 1977
Grosse Pointe Farms Sewage Pumping Station		305 Chalfonte	Grosse Pointe Farms	February 18, 1993
Grosse Pointe Farms Water Filtration Plant and Pumping Station		29 Moross	Grosse Pointe Farms	February 18, 1993
Grosse Pointe Shores Village Hall		795 Lake Shore Road	Grosse Pointe Shores	2018
Grosse Pointe High School†		11 Grosse Pointe Boulevard	Grosse Pointe Farms	December 17, 1992
Grosse Pointe Memorial Church†		16 Lakeshore Drive	Grosse Pointe Farms	April 19, 1990
Colonel John Hamtramck Burial Place		Berres and Dan	Hamtramck	October 22, 1963
Harmonie Club† / Germantown		267 East Grand River Avenue	Detroit	October 21, 1975
Harper Hospital (demolished; NR delisted 01/11/78)		3990 John R Street	Detroit	March 30, 1971
Col. Frank J. Hecker House†		5510 Woodward Avenue	Detroit	February 19, 1958
Highland Park General Hospital†		357 Glendale Avenue	Highland Park	March 5, 1979
Highland Park Plant‡		91 Manchester Avenue / 14100 Woodward Avenue	Highland Park	July 17, 1997
Highland Park Presbyterian Church†		14 Cortland Street	Highland Park	August 12, 1983
Hilberry Theater		4743 Cass Avenue	Detroit	September 8, 1982
Holy Family Roman Catholic Church		641 Walter P. Chrysler Highway	Detroit	February 16, 1989
Hook and Ladder House No. 5-Detroit Fire Department Repair Shop†		3434-3400 Russell Street	Detroit	June 19, 1975
Hudson-Evans House†		79 Alfred Street	Detroit	November 15, 1973
Huguenot House (Demolished)		2540 3rd Street	Detroit	May 14, 1975
Hull's Trace Informational Designation		36000 W Jefferson Avenue	Brownstown Charter Township	2012
Hurlbut Memorial Gate†		E Jefferson Avenue at Cadillac Boulevard	Detroit	July 26, 1974
Indian Village†		Burns, Iroquois, & Seminole from E Jefferson to Mack	Detroit	October 29, 1971
Ireland and Matthews Manufacturing Plant		227 Iron Street	Detroit	December 5, 1986
Jewell Colony		Bounded by Lakewood Dr, Meridian Rd, Island Rd, and West River Rd	Grosse Ile	December 5, 1986
Johnson's Tavern Informational Site		35118 Michigan	Wayne	June 27, 1969
Albert Kahn House†		208 Mack Avenue	Detroit	December 7, 1971
Charles A. Kandt House		22331 Morley	Dearborn	July 19, 1990
Angus Keith House		9510 Horse Mill Road	Grosse Ile	November 16, 1989
Charles Brady King Auto Informational Designation		618 St. Antoine	Detroit	September 25, 1956
L. B. King and Company Building†		1274 Library Avenue	Detroit	January 22, 1987
Birth of Kiwanis/Griswold Hotel Informational Site		Griswold Street and Grand River Avenue	Detroit	January 24, 1964
Herman Kreit House		16004 East Jefferson	Grosse Pointe Park	April 24, 1981
S. S. Kresge World Headquarters†		2727 Second Avenue	Detroit	August 3, 1979
Martin Kundig Commemorative Designation		3300 Jefferies	Detroit	May 14, 1975
William Lambert Homesite Informational Site		1930 East Lafayette	Detroit	November 14, 1974
Landing of Cadillac Informational Site		Hart Plaza, Jefferson Avenue at Woodward Avenue	Detroit	May 22, 1979
The Lapham Home		22110 Morley Avenue	Dearborn	September 14, 1995
Le Côté du Nord-est Informational Site		Joseph Campau Avenue at the Detroit River	Detroit	September 17, 1974
Father John A. Lemke Informational Designation		Saint Albertus R.C. Church, 4231 St. Aubin Street	Detroit	March 19, 1980
Lewis College of Business (also known as the James F. Murphy House)		5450 John R Street	Detroit	June 30, 1988
Frederick Linsell House		5104 Second Avenue	Detroit	October 23, 1987
Livonia Revolutionary War Soldiers Informational Designation		Livonia Bicentennial Park, West Seven Mile and Wayne roads	Livonia	January 16, 1976
Mackenzie House		4735 Cass Avenue	Detroit	March 5, 1979
George P. MacNichol House†		2610 Biddle Avenue	Wyandotte	November 15, 1973
Main Detroit Public Library		5201 Woodward Avenue	Detroit	January 24, 1964
Lewis E. Maire Elementary School		740 Cadieux	Grosse Pointe	December 5, 1996
Mansion House and Survey Tree Informational Site		20722 River Road	Grosse Ile	December 10, 1963
Mariners' Church† / U.S. Topographical Engineers Informational Designation		170 Jefferson Avenue	Detroit	October 23, 1957
Marx House†		2630 Biddle Avenue	Wyandotte	January 16, 1976
Mary Bell's Millinery - John Allen's Cafe		1378-1384 Michigan Avenue	Detroit	May 18, 1989
Elijah McCoy Home Informational Site		5730 Lincoln Avenue	Detroit	November 14, 1974
Orsel McGhee House		4626 Seebaldt	Detroit	December 14, 1976
McGregor Public Library		12244 Woodward Avenue	Highland Park	February 21, 1991
Gustave Mehlhose House		367 Oak Street	Wyandotte	March 21, 1991
Louis Mehlhose House		355 Oak Street	Wyandotte	March 17, 1994
Merrill-Morris House		13880 Huron River Drive South	Romulus	May 17, 1978
Metropolitan United Methodist Church†		8000 Woodward Avenue	Detroit	October 23, 1986
Michigan Alkali Company		1609 Biddle Street	Wyandotte	October 11, 1990
Michigan Central Railroad Detroit Station		2405 West Vernor Street	Detroit	September 17, 1974
Michigan Soldiers' and Sailors' Monument		Cadillac Square at Woodward	Detroit	February 17, 1965
Michigan State Medical Society Informational Site		85-87 Woodward Avenue, between Congress and Larned streets	Detroit	June 11, 1965
The Michigan Stove		State Fairgrounds, near Woodward Avenue	Detroit	June 18, 1998
Michigan's First Capitol / Capitol Union School Informational Site		Griswold and State streets	Detroit	August 23, 1956
Michigan's First Lasting Newspaper		West Jefferson between Griswold and Shelby	Detroit	August 23, 1956
Michigan's First Seat of Government Informational Site		313 Woodward Avenue	Detroit	August 23, 1956
Michigan's First Theater Informational Site			Detroit	September 25, 1956
Mill Race Historical Village Informational Designation		Griswold Street	Northville	June 10, 1987
Sidney D. Miller Middle School		2322 DuBois Street	Detroit	December 5, 1986
Monroe Avenue Commercial Buildings (Partially demolished, February 1990)†		16-118 Monroe Avenue	Detroit	December 18, 1974
John Moore House		306 St. Joseph Street	Trenton	November 16, 1981
Moross House†		1460 East Jefferson	Detroit	June 19, 1971
Most Holy Trinity Catholic Church and Rectory		1050 Porter	Detroit	October 27, 1984
Motown Informational Site		2648 West Grand Boulevard	Detroit	August 21, 1987
Muer's Oyster House, Inc (Demolished)		2000 Gratiot Avenue	Detroit	August 3, 1979
Cornelius G. Munger General Store		Munger Lane, corner of Gibraltar and Evergreen Roads	Flat Rock	November 15, 1990
Music Hall†		350 Madison Avenue	Detroit	August 6, 1976
Nankin Mills		33175 Ann Arbor Trail	Westland	March 11, 1967
Nankin Pioneer Informational Designation		Warren Road and Sunset Drive	Garden City	January 22, 1965
Nankin Township School District No. 3 Commemorative Designation		6420 Newburgh Road	Westland	January 20, 1994
Newburg Methodist Church Commemorative Designation		36500 Ann Arbor Trail	Livonia	October 20, 1994
Newburgh Cemetery		36000 Ann Arbor Trail	Livonia	January 24, 1964
Newburgh Mill		37401 Edward Hines Drive	Livonia	September 7, 1989
North Woodward Avenue Congregational Church†		8715 Woodward Avenue	Detroit	September 3, 1998
Northville Historic District†		Bounded roughly by Cady, Rogers and Randolph streets	Northville	December 11, 1970
Northwood House†		3985 Trumbull Avenue	Detroit	July 26, 1974
Norwayne Subdivision†			Westland	2014
Oak Grove Cemetery		Burr and Buck roads	Taylor	May 19, 1988
Old City Hall Informational Site (building demolished)		Woodward Avenue at Cadillac Square	Detroit	February 19, 1958
Old Van Buren Township Hall		405 Main Street	Belleville	November 15, 1973
Old Wayne Village Hall		1 Town Hall Street	Wayne	October 23, 1986
Oldest Jewish Cemetery Commemorative Designation		3371 East Lafayette	Detroit	August 14, 1962
Omega Psi Phi Fraternity House		235 East Ferry Street	Detroit	December 14, 1976
Orchestra Hall†		3711 Woodward Avenue	Detroit	December 11, 1970
Packard Motor Car Company		1580 Grand Boulevard	Detroit	January 13, 1982
Palmer Park		North of Second Avenue at Merrill Plaisance	Detroit	December 14, 1976
The Palms†		1001 E Jefferson Ave	Detroit	August 3, 1979
Park Avenue Historic District†		2209, 2233, 2323, and 2333 Park Avenue; 113 and 119 Fisher Freeway	Detroit	April 18, 1996
Perrinsville Informational Designation		Ann Arbor Trail and Merriman Road	Westland	October 7, 1975
Perrinsville School		31755 Cowan Road at Warren Road	Westland	August 29, 1996
Pewabic Pottery‡ / Mary Chase Perry Stratton Informational Designation		10125 East Jefferson Avenue	Detroit	December 11, 1970
Phoenix Mill		14973 Northville Road	Northville Township	September 7, 1989
The Players†		3321 East Jefferson Avenue	Detroit	August 22, 1985
Plymouth Informational Designation		City Hall, 201 South Main	Plymouth	December 21, 1978
Plymouth Mill		230 Wilcox Road	Plymouth Township	September 21, 1989
Pointe Mouillee Marsh Informational Designation		37205 Mouillee Road	Brownstown	February 15, 1990
Poles in Michigan			Hamtramck	September 17, 1957
Police Dispatch Radio Informational Designation		Belle Isle	Detroit	2008
Potawatomi Cession of Grosse Ile		Bridge Road	Grosse Ile	February 17, 1965
Ransom Eli Olds Commemorative Designation		Picnic shelter on Central between Casino Wayne and Ruse Road, Belle Isle	Detroit	September 4, 1997
Old Rawsonville Village Informational Designation		Mosley-Bennett-Barlow Nature Preserve, 2193 Rawsonville Road	Belleville vicinity	October 27, 1983
Recreation Park Informational Designation		Harper Hospital, 3990 John R Street	Detroit	June 10, 1987
Redeemer Lutheran Church		6087 Fifteenth Street	Detroit	August 22, 1981
Redford Cemetery		Telegraph Road between Five Mile Road and Puritan Avenue	Detroit	June 13, 1986
Redford Theatre†		17354 Lahser Avenue	Detroit	August 18, 1988
Redford Township District No. 5 School†		18499 Beech Daly Road	Redford	March 17, 1994
Redford Township School District No. 9 Informational Designation		12259 Beech-Daly Road at Southwestern and Capitol	Redford	May 16, 1991
Religious of the Sacred Heart Informational Designation		South side of East Jefferson Avenue between Beaubien & St. Antoine streets	Detroit	March 20, 1994
Reves-Wilhelm Cemetery		Park on Wall Street between Greenfield Road and Oakwood Boulevard	Melvindale	August 14, 1962
The Richard Press Informational Designation		5450 West Jefferson Avenue	Detroit	September 25, 1956
Pere Gabriel Richard Elementary School†		176 McKinley Avenue	Grosse Pointe Farms	August 20, 1992
Fannie Richards Home		1357 East Congress	Detroit	November 14, 1974
Franklin L. Robbe House		12955 Haggerty Road	Belleville	February 25, 1988
John Anthony Rucker House		21719 West River Road, between Church and Lakeview roads	Grosse Ile	November 26, 1985
Sacred Heart Parish†		1000 Elliot Street and 3481 Rivard	Detroit	June 19, 1975
St. Albertus Church†		4231 St. Aubin	Detroit	July 26, 1974
Saint Alphonsus Parish Complex		7455 Calhoun	Dearborn	August 29, 1996
Saint Andrew's Benevolent Society		431 East Congress	Detroit	April 24, 1981
Ste. Anne Church† / Gabriel Richard Informational Designation		1000 St Anne Street	Detroit	May 14, 1975
Saint Anthony Catholic Church		5247 Sheridan Avenue	Detroit	June 20, 1985
Saint Antoine YMCA Informational Site		635 Elizabeth	Detroit	March 2, 1976
Saint Bernard of Clairvaux Roman Catholic Church		11031 Mack Avenue at Lillibridge	Detroit	August 21, 1986
St. Boniface Roman Catholic Church†		2356 Vermont Avenue	Detroit	March 23, 1983
Saint David School and Convent		8105-8111 East Outer Drive	Detroit	September 25, 1985
Saint Elizabeth Church		3138 East Canfield Avenue	Detroit	January 27, 1983
Saint Francis Hospital (now used as the City Hall)		3401 Evaline	Hamtramck	February 25, 1988
Saint Hyacinth Roman Catholic Church Complex		3151 Farnsworth, 5240 McDougall	Detroit	September 21, 1988
Saint James Episcopal Chapel†		25150 East River Road	Grosse Ile	May 18, 1971
Saint John's Episcopal Church†		2326 Woodward Avenue	Detroit	June 10, 1987
Saint John's Presbyterian Church Informational Designation		1961 E. Lafayette	Detroit	August 23, 1990
Saint Josaphat's Roman Catholic Church Complex†		715 Canfield	Detroit	November 26, 1985
Saint Joseph Roman Catholic Parish Complex†		1828 Jay Street	Detroit	June 16, 1972
Saint Joseph's Retreat Informational Site		23300 Michigan Avenue, at Outer Drive	Dearborn	June 16, 1972
Saint Mary's Roman Catholic Church		646 Monroe	Detroit	June 15, 1979
Saint Matthew's Episcopal Church		2019 St. Antoine	Detroit	March 2, 1976
Saint Paul Roman Catholic Church Complex†		157 Lake Shore Road	Grosse Pointe Farms	October 15, 1992
Saint Philip's Lutheran Congregation Informational Designation		2884 East Grand Boulevard	Detroit	July 21, 1988
Ss. Peter and Paul Church†		629 East Jefferson Avenue	Detroit	January 22, 1971
Salvation Army Commemorative Designation		Randolph Street boulevard between Congress and Larned	Detroit	February 17, 1994
Sandhill Cemetery		Southeast corner of Telegraph and Pardee Roads	Taylor	May 19, 1988
Scarab Club†		217 Farnsworth	Detroit	July 26, 1974
Robert Pauli Scherer Informational Designation		Children's Museum, 67 Kirby Street	Detroit	June 15, 1984
Emanuel Schloss House		234 Winder	Detroit	August 18, 1988
Louis E. Schmidt Auditorium		20155 Middlebelt Road	Livonia	November 18, 2000
Schwankowsky Building		1500 Woodward Avenue	Detroit	October 2, 1980
Second Baptist Church of Detroit†		441 Monroe Street	Detroit	September 17, 1974
John Sell Farmstead		20904 Northline Road	Taylor	February 23, 1981
Sheldon's Corners Informational Designation		Southeast corner of Michigan Avenue and Sheldon Road	Canton	May 21, 1985
Henry G. and Charlotte B. Sherrard House		59 Lakeshore Drive	Grosse Pointe Farms	December 19, 1984
Shiloh Baptist Church		557 Benton	Detroit	January 19, 1989
Shrine Circus Informational Designation		Randolph Street and Larned Street	Detroit	December 21, 1982
Shulte House (Demolished)		2446 St. Aubin	Detroit	September 17, 1974
Sibley House†		976 Jefferson Avenue	Detroit	February 19, 1958
Frederic M. Sibley Lumber Company Office Building†		6460 Kercheval Avenue	Detroit	April 20, 1989
Simmons House		38125 Base Line Road	Livonia	August 13, 1971
James Smith Farm		2015 Clements	Detroit	July 19, 1990
Springwells Municipal Building		13615 Michigan Avenue	Dearborn	March 20, 1984
George A. Starkweather House		711 Starkweather	Plymouth	June 15, 1989
State Police Post Informational Designation		Rockwood State Police Post, 32409 Fort Street	Rockwood	September 16, 1986
State Savings Bank†		151 Fort Street	Detroit	January 8, 1981
State Fair		1120 West State Fair Avenue, Woodward Avenue at 8 Mile Road	Detroit	September 17, 1957
Stearns Telephone Informational Site		511 Woodward	Detroit	April 24, 1970
Frederick Stearns Building†		6533 East Jefferson Avenue	Detroit	January 8, 1981
John C. Stellwagen House		41903 South Service Drive	Belleville vicinity	May 13, 1981
Sarah Mellen Stephens Estate Entrance Gateway		Forsyth Lane at Grosse Pointe Boulevard	Grosse Pointe Farms	April 10, 1986
Walter Stowers Home		4180 Burns	Detroit	February 7, 1977
D. Augustus Straker Informational Site		428 Temple	Detroit	January 16, 1976
Stroh Brewery (Demolished)		Gratiot Avenue, SE of I-75	Detroit	October 21, 1975
Sutherland House		1142 South Main Street	Plymouth	January 22, 1987
Ossian Sweet House† / Dr. Ossian Sweet Informational Designation		2905 Garland	Detroit	November 21, 1975
Sweetest Heart of Mary Catholic Church†		4440 Russell Street	Detroit	July 26, 1974
Taylor Methodist Episcopal Church		22395 Eureka Road	Taylor	July 20, 1984
Taylor Methodist Episcopal Church Cemetery		22395 Eureka Road	Taylor	April 19, 1990
Taylor Township Cemetery		Northeast corner of Golden Ridge and McKinley	Taylor	January 21, 1988
Elisha Taylor House†		59 Alfred Street	Detroit	November 15, 1973
Teakle House		4223 Lincoln	Detroit	September 15, 1975
Territorial Road		Geddes Road near Sheldon Road / US 12	Canton Township	2019
Thompson Home†		4756 Cass Avenue	Detroit	November 14, 1974
John Tibbitts Farmstead		46225 North Territorial Road	Plymouth	February 28, 1986
Tiger Stadium†		2121 Trumbull Ave	Detroit	September 15, 1975
Trinity Episcopal Church†		1519 Martin Luther King	Detroit	August 3, 1979
Trinity Lutheran Church†		1335-45 Gratiot	Detroit	April 24, 1981
Charles Trombly House†		553 East Jefferson Avenue	Detroit	August 15, 1975
Charles Trowbridge House†		1380 Jefferson	Detroit	July 26, 1974
Trumbull Avenue Presbyterian Church and Organ		1435 Brainard	Detroit	June 6, 1977
Turkel House		2760 Seven Mile Road	Detroit	November 2, 1980
U.S. Customs House		Parkway at East River Road	Grosse Ile	May 20, 1982
University of Detroit High School		8400 South Cambridge	Detroit	November 16, 1981
Edward Van Husan - Dr. Robert Gillman House		61 Peterboro St	Detroit	March 16, 1989
William Van Moore - Robert B. Tanahill House		67 Peterboro St	Detroit	April 20, 1989
James H Vhay House		60 Charlotte, between Woodward and Park Streets	Detroit	December 15, 1988
Village Waterworks		337 Lake Shore Road	Grosse Pointe Farms	September 14, 1995
Vinton Building†		600 Woodward Avenue	Detroit	November 16, 1982
John Wagner Residence (demolished)		468 Peterboro St	Detroit	June 15, 1979
Robert Wagstaff House		2576 Riverside Drive	Trenton	April 10, 1986
Wallaceville School		8050 North Gulley Road	Dearborn Heights	February 17, 1967
War of 1812 Dead Informational Site		Southwest corner of Washington Boulevard and Michigan Avenue	Detroit	November 17, 1962
Wardwell House		16109 Jefferson Avenue	Grosse Pointe Park	August 6, 1976
Wayne County Courthouse†		600 Randolph Street	Detroit	September 17, 1974
Wayne State University Informational Designation		4735-4841 Cass Avenue	Detroit	January 19, 1957
Joseph F. Weber House		206 Eliot	Detroit	December 17, 1987
Andrew Jackson Welsh House		512 West Dunlap	Northville	February 23, 1981
West Canfield Historic District†		West Canfield between Second and Third Avenues	Detroit	November 6, 1970
Wheeler Center		637 Brewster	Detroit	March 2, 1976
David Whitney, Jr. Residence†		4421 Woodward Avenue	Detroit	December 10, 1971
Wilson Barn†		9710 Middlebelt Road, NE corner of West Chicago	Livonia	November 15, 1973
Women's City Club of Detroit†		2110 Park Avenue	Detroit	April 29, 1979
John Wood Log Cabin		South side of Middle Gibraltar Road, west of Jefferson	Gibraltar	August 3, 1979
Woodward East Historic District†		Bounded by Alfred, Edmund, Watson, and Brush and John R streets	Detroit	September 17, 1974
Zion Evangelical Lutheran Church		4305 Military near Buchanan	Detroit	February 16, 1989

== See also ==
- National Register of Historic Places listings in Wayne County, Michigan

== Sources ==
- Historic Sites Online – Wayne County. Michigan State Housing Developmental Authority. Accessed January 4, 2011.
