= Mill race (disambiguation) =

A mill race is the current of water that turns a water wheel, or the channel (sluice) conducting water to or from a water wheel.

Mill race may also refer to:

- Mill Race (Eugene), a mill race in Eugene, Oregon.
- Mill Race (log flume), a log flume formerly at Cedar Point amusement park in Sandusky, Ohio
- Mill Race Bridge, a historic structure in Eldorado, Iowa
- Mill Race Park, a city park in Columbus, Indiana
- Mill Race Village, part of Northville Historic District, Northville, Michigan
