= Knickerbocker Bicycle Bridge =

Bridge in Eugene, Oregon, U.S.

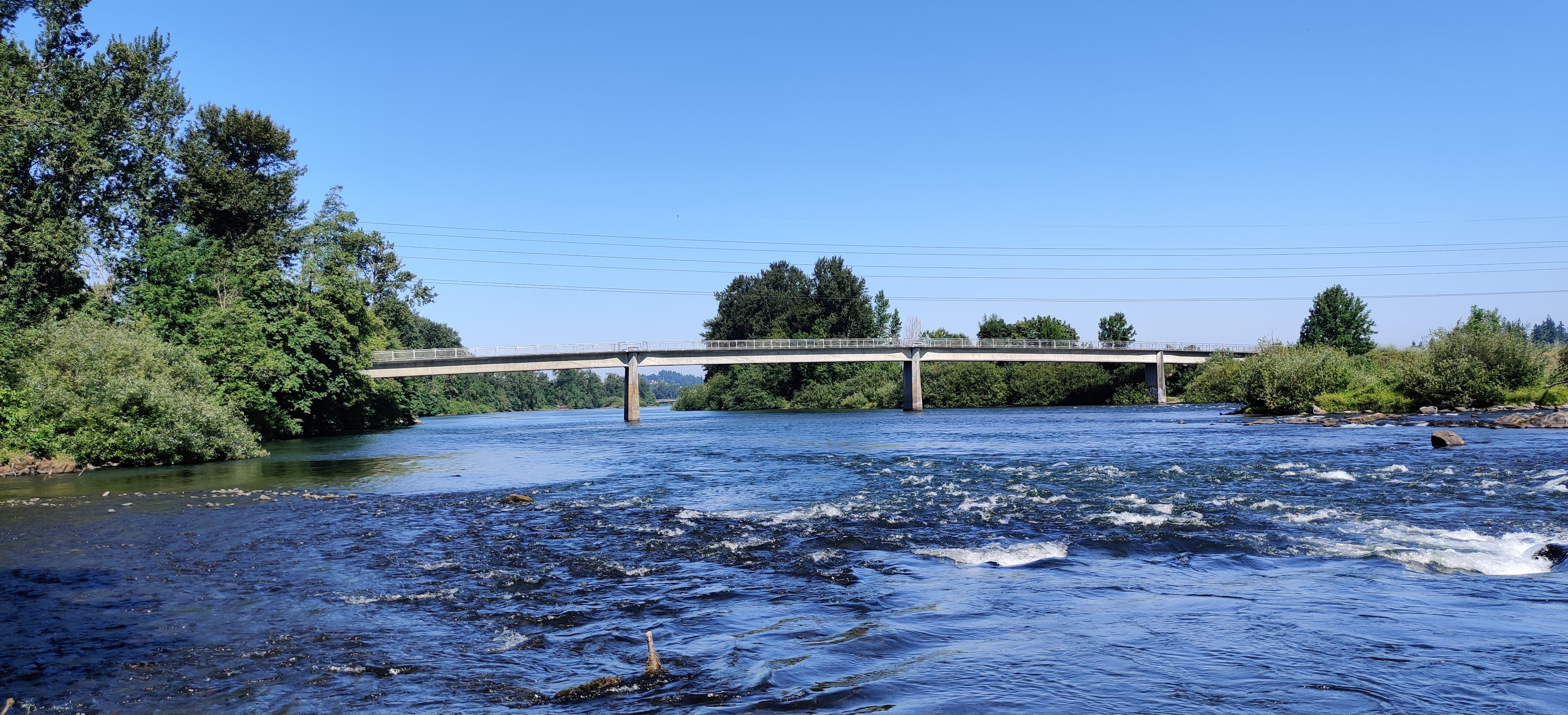
- Knickerbocker Bicycle Bridge, viewed from the river.
- Coordinates: 44.0453°N 123.0522°W
- Carries: bicycle and pedestrian traffic, water main
- Crosses: Willamette River
- Locale: Eugene, Oregon
- Official name: Willie Knickerbocker Bridge
- Owner: EWEB

Characteristics
- Material: Concrete
- Total length: 523 ft (159 m)
- Width: 14 ft (4.3 m)
- No. of spans: 5
- Piers in water: 3

History
- Architect: OBEC Consulting Engineers
- Construction start: 1978
- Construction end: 1980
- Construction cost: $440,000
- Inaugurated: September 27, 1980

Statistics
- Toll: none

Location
- Interactive map of Knickerbocker Bicycle Bridge

Knickerbocker Bicycle Bridge (officially the Willie Knickerbocker Bridge) is a bridge across the Willamette River in Eugene, Oregon, United States. The bridge was dedicated in 1980.

The bridge was originally constructed to carry a Eugene Water & Electric Board water main for $330,000. The city and county added the bridge deck, rails, and approaches for $110,000.

The bridge is named for Willie Knickerbocker (1868–1960), "The Father of Bicycling in Eugene".

== See also ==
- List of crossings of the Willamette River
- Whilamut Passage Bridge—nearby bridge running parallel to the Knickerbocker Bicycle Bridge over the Millrace.
