= Whilamut Passage Bridge =

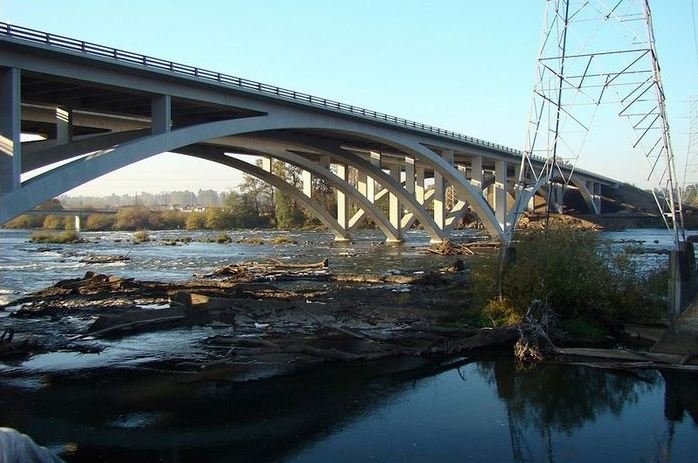
- Both spans in 2013 after completion, with east span in foreground
- Coordinates: 44°02′42″N 123°03′00″W
- Carries: I-5
- Crosses: Willamette River
- Locale: Eugene, Oregon
- Owner: Oregon Department of Transportation
- ID number: 21038 001 19275x
- Preceded by: Springfield Bridge
- Followed by: Knickerbocker Bicycle Bridge

Characteristics
- Design: Arch
- Material: Concrete
- Total length: 1,984.7 feet (604.9 m)
- Width: 64 feet (20 m)
- Longest span: 416 feet (127 m)
- No. of spans: 2
- Load limit: 40.2 metric tons (39.6 long tons; 44.3 short tons)
- No. of lanes: 2

History
- Construction start: 2009
- Construction end: 2011 (west span); 2013 (east span)
- Construction cost: $204 million

Statistics
- Daily traffic: 30,400 (2018)

The Whilamut Passage Bridge is a pair of bridges across the Willamette River in Eugene, Oregon, U.S. The west span was completed in 2011. The east span was completed and opened in August 2013. They carry Interstate 5 traffic and replaced an earlier bridge completed in 1961. Construction on the bridges began in 2009 and cost $204 million.

== See also ==
- List of crossings of the Willamette River
- Knickerbocker Bicycle Bridge—nearby bicycle bridge running parallel to the Whilamut Passage Bridge over the Millrace
