= Fruehauf Trailer Corporation =

Defunct American manufacturing company

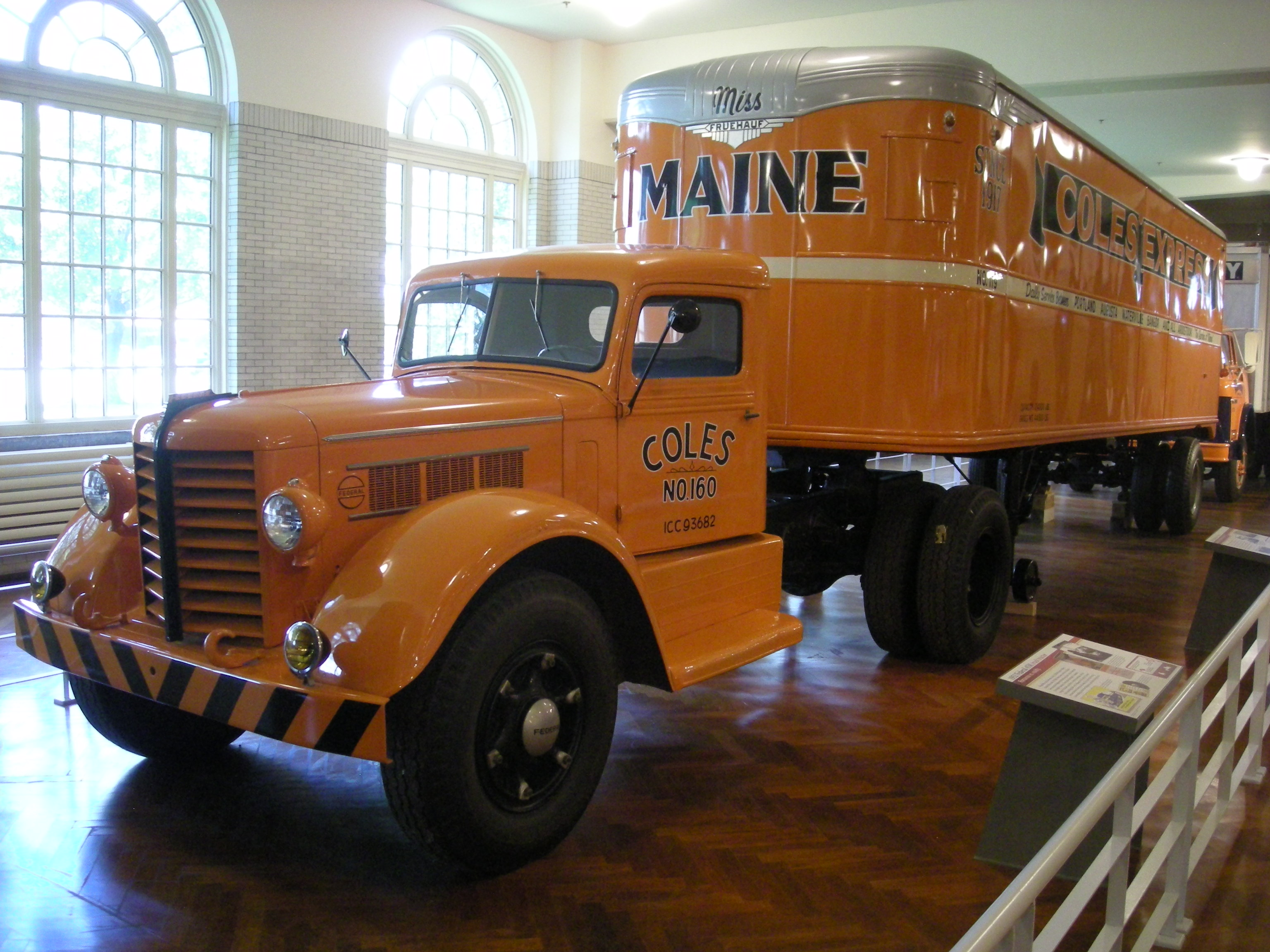
- A 1946 Fruehauf semi-trailer (mated to a 1952 Federal 45M truck tractor) on display at the Henry Ford Museum in 2012
- Industry: Semi-trailer manufacturing, defense industry
- Founded: Detroit, Michigan, U.S. February 27, 1918
- Founder: August Charles Fruehauf
- Fate: Acquired by Wabash National

Fruehauf Trailer Corporation, previously Fruehauf Trailer Company (1918–1963) and Fruehauf Corporation (1963–1989), was an American company engaged in the manufacture and sale of truck trailers, and other machinery and equipment, with headquarters located in Detroit, Michigan. It was founded in 1918 in Detroit, after August Fruehauf created the semi-trailer and launched a new industry. The Fruehauf trailer company introduced revolutionary inventions to trucking and transportation with hydraulic dump trailers, bulk tanker trailers, and automatic fifth-wheel couplings among their more than one thousand patents, including the shipping container in 1956. Expanding across the country, Fruehauf had 16 plants and more than 80 distributorships for parts and service. Globally, the company expanded into Europe, South America, and Asia.

Following a proxy battle in the late 1980s the company filed for bankruptcy protection in 1997. International divisions became independent, U.S. subsidiaries such as Kelsey Hayes, Pro-Par, Budd Wheels, and Hobbs were sold; Wabash National acquired the crippled company in 1997.

== History ==
The company's founder, August Charles Fruehauf (1868–1930), was born in Fraser, Michigan, the son of Sophia and Charles Fruehauf. (Note: The Fruehauf surname is German in origin, originally spelled "Frühauf", meaning "early riser".) He began his career as a Detroit-area blacksmith and carriage builder. In 1914, a local businessman named Frederic M. Sibley asked Fruehauf to build a trailer that could be towed behind a Ford Model T and transport a boat to upper Michigan. Fruehauf successfully built the device, and Sibley requested he build additional trailers for use on his lumber yard. Fruehauf would call them "semi-trailers", and his product proved popular. In 1918, he incorporated his business as the Fruehauf Trailer Company.

The semi-trailers soon demonstrated their practicality and orders came in from competing lumber dealers and any manufacturer who wanted to expand their customer base. Closed van trailers were designed and put into service. Industries such as dairy and fuel oil were revolutionized with this "go-anywhere" type of transportation. Capitalizing on August Fruehauf's slogan, "a horse can pull more than it can carry, so can a truck", the company continued to grow.

The St. Louis plant

Fruehauf developed semi-trailers for use in World War I, World War II, and the Korean War. Developing more than 150 patents for military products alone, these were eventually introduced into commercial use. Among them were early versions of the shipping container used on some U.S. railroads and, after 1956, on the ships of Pan-Atlantic Steamship Co., the ship line controlled by container pioneer Malcom McLean and later known as Sea-Land. Fruehauf contributed to the creation of the American Trucking Association and was instrumental in the creation of the interstate highway system as advisors to President Dwight D. Eisenhower.

Fruehauf purchased competing companies to acquire distribution, new technology, or geographic advantages. Warner-Fruehauf in Baltimore, Hobbs from Texas, and Strick in the Midwest. On February 28, 1947, the Fruehauf Corporation purchased the Carter Manufacturing Company. Carter was started in 1927 and based in Memphis, Tennessee, with another location in Birmingham, Alabama. The Carter Manufacturing Company was involved in the manufacturing of trailers from the Carter plant. As with Warner-Fruehauf in Baltimore, all trailers made out of the Memphis and Birmingham plants were called Fruehauf-Carter.

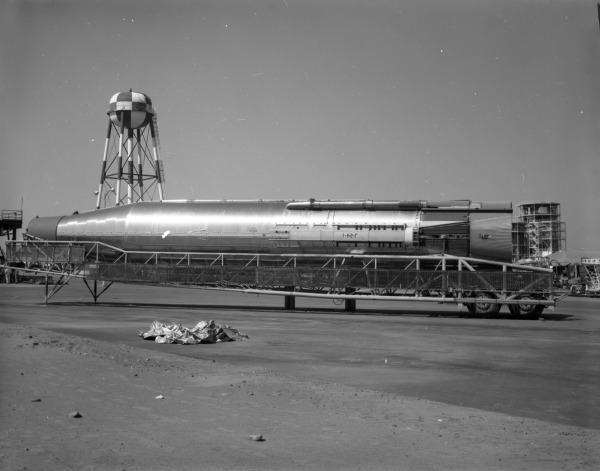
Fruehauf designed and built trailers, launchers and GHE for ICBM, IRBM, and tactical ballistic missiles of various types

During the U.S. guided missile boom in the 1950s and 1960s, Fruehauf developed and manufactured missile vehicles, ground-based and submarine-based missile launchers, transporters/erectors, shipping containers, ground handling equipment, equipment shelters, and other components for the U.S. Army, Navy, and Air Force. This included systems for the Atlas, Bomarc, Corporal, Falcon, Genie, Hawk, Matador, Nike Ajax, Nike Hercules, Jupiter, Polaris, Redstone, Regulus I, II, Sergeant, Thor, and Titan missiles. To meet increasing defense contract work, the hub of the company's ground handling/ground support equipment (GHE/GSE) production was placed at its plant in Delphos, Ohio. The company also provided the army with 5,000-US-gallon (19,000 L) fuel tank semi-trailers and 12-ton semi-trailers. At its plant in Fullerton, California (previously owned by Hanson Bros.) it manufactured 15-ton amphibious lighters and reusable metal shipping boxes for military purposes. Both Detroit and Fullerton branches of the company's military products division took part in the U.S. space program, producing among the other things Gemini practice recovery spacecraft.

In 1959, the company, Roy Fruehauf, Teamsters Union President Dave Beck, and others were indicted on charges that the company had illegally lent $200,000 to Beck in 1954. The Teamsters had previously lent $1.5 million to Roy Fruehauf to finance a proxy fight against his elder brother, Harvey, and Roy Fruehauf was alleged to have returned the favor by making the loan to Beck. As the Teamsters represented some Fruehauf employees, the loan was alleged to be an illegal gift or bribe, in violation of the Labor-Management Relations Act of 1947. The U.S. Supreme Court upheld the indictment in 1961, but subsequently, the case was dismissed.

Following the death of August's sons, Harvey, Harry, and Roy Fruehauf, the Fruehauf family was no longer in charge by the mid-1960s. Resting on the laurels of the preceding decades, management would not make the tough and difficult personal sacrifices needed to withstand economic challenges. While the company eventually diversified and expanded its operations, financial issues resulted in the sell-off of company divisions in 1989. The truck trailer unit continued operation as Fruehauf Trailer Corporation.

In the 1970s and 1980s, Fruehauf became a major manufacturer of aluminum or steel marine intermodal containers for container ships, both in the U.S. as well as through various overseas subsidiaries such as Crane Fruehauf in the UK, Fruehauf France or Nippon Fruehauf, with major global shipping lines and container leasing companies as customers.

The company declared bankruptcy on October 7, 1996. An axle plant in Ohio was sold to Holland Hitch Company on February 18, 1997, and Fruehauf's United States manufacturing and sales business was sold to Wabash National on March 17, 1997. Prior to the bankruptcy, the Bellinger Shipyard owned by Fruehauf in Jacksonville, Florida, was sold to M. D. Moody & Sons, Inc. for $1.9 million in 1995 and then the Jacksonville Shipyard was sold to developers in 2014. Companies in France, Mexico, New Zealand, and Japan continued to operate under the Fruehauf name.

In 2015, Poland's largest trailer company, Wielton, purchased a 65% share of Fruehauf France. It completed the purchase of the balance in 2017.

In 2021, MV Commercial purchased Fruehauf in the UK from administration. It aimed to revive the brand and increase production by investing heavily in the business, which had been neglected for several years.

In 2023, Fruehauf featured in the October issue of Bulk & Tipper magazine, with the article covering Fruehauf's acquisition by MV Commercial and the success of the takeover.
