= Redford Cemetery =

Cemetery in Michigan, U.S.

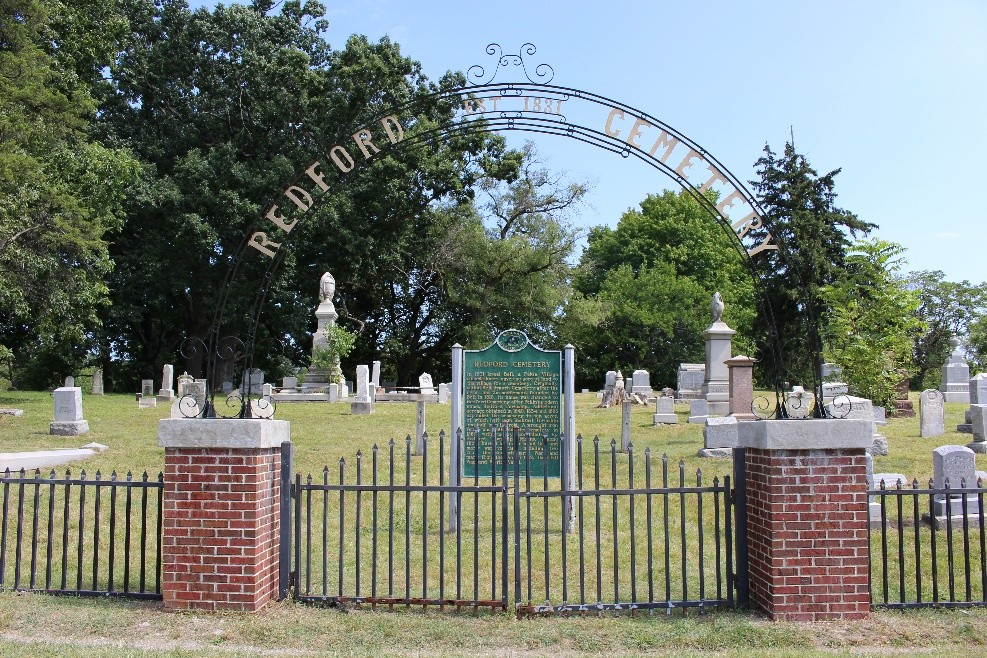
- Interactive map of Redford Cemetery

Details
- Established: 1831
- Location: 15898 Telegraph Road, Redford, Michigan
- Coordinates: 42°24′23″N 83°16′32″W
- Type: Non-profit
- Size: 10 acres (4.0 ha)
- No. of graves: Approximately 2,000
- Website: https://redfordcemetery.org/
- Find a Grave: Redford Cemetery

Redford Cemetery is a historic cemetery on Telegraph Road in Redford Township, Michigan, United States, established in 1831. Originally known as Bell Branch Cemetery and later as Redford Pioneer Cemetery, it was listed as a Michigan Historic Site in 1986. The cemetery contains approximately 2,300 burials, including the graves of many early settlers and veterans of several American wars. Among the earliest burials are veterans of the American Revolutionary War and the War of 1812. More than 120 veterans who served in the Toledo War, Mexican-American War, American Civil War, World War I, World War II, Korean War, and the Vietnam War are buried at the cemetery.

== History ==
Redford Township, originally named Pekin, was organized on October 29, 1829, and later renamed Redford Township in March 1833. In 1831, Israel Bell (1805–1885), a Pekin Village commissioner and early settler, gave a small parcel of land to the village for a cemetery. It was originally called Bell Branch Cemetery, after the settlement founded in 1818, and was later also known as Redford Pioneer Cemetery. Its name was changed to Redford Cemetery after Pekin was renamed Redford Township.

In 1926, the City of Detroit annexed part of Redford Township including approximately 70% of the cemetery. The remaining western portion along Telegraph Road (US 24) remained in Redford Township.

In March 1933, the Redford Cemetery Association (RCA) was established as a non-profit corporation. Following petitions to the Redford Township Board and the City of Detroit, in 1933 the Township deeded to the Association the land the cemetery occupied in Redford Township and the City of Detroit granted a lease in perpetuity of the rest of the land occupied by the cemetery. The lease was issued because the Common Council of the City of Detroit did not have the power under the city's charter to deed away cemetery property. These agreements reflected the municipal boundary created by the 1926 annexation. Today, the cemetery spans both Redford Township and the City of Detroit, with its entrance located in Redford Township. The cemetery is operated by the elected volunteers of the Redford Cemetery Association.

== Historic designation ==
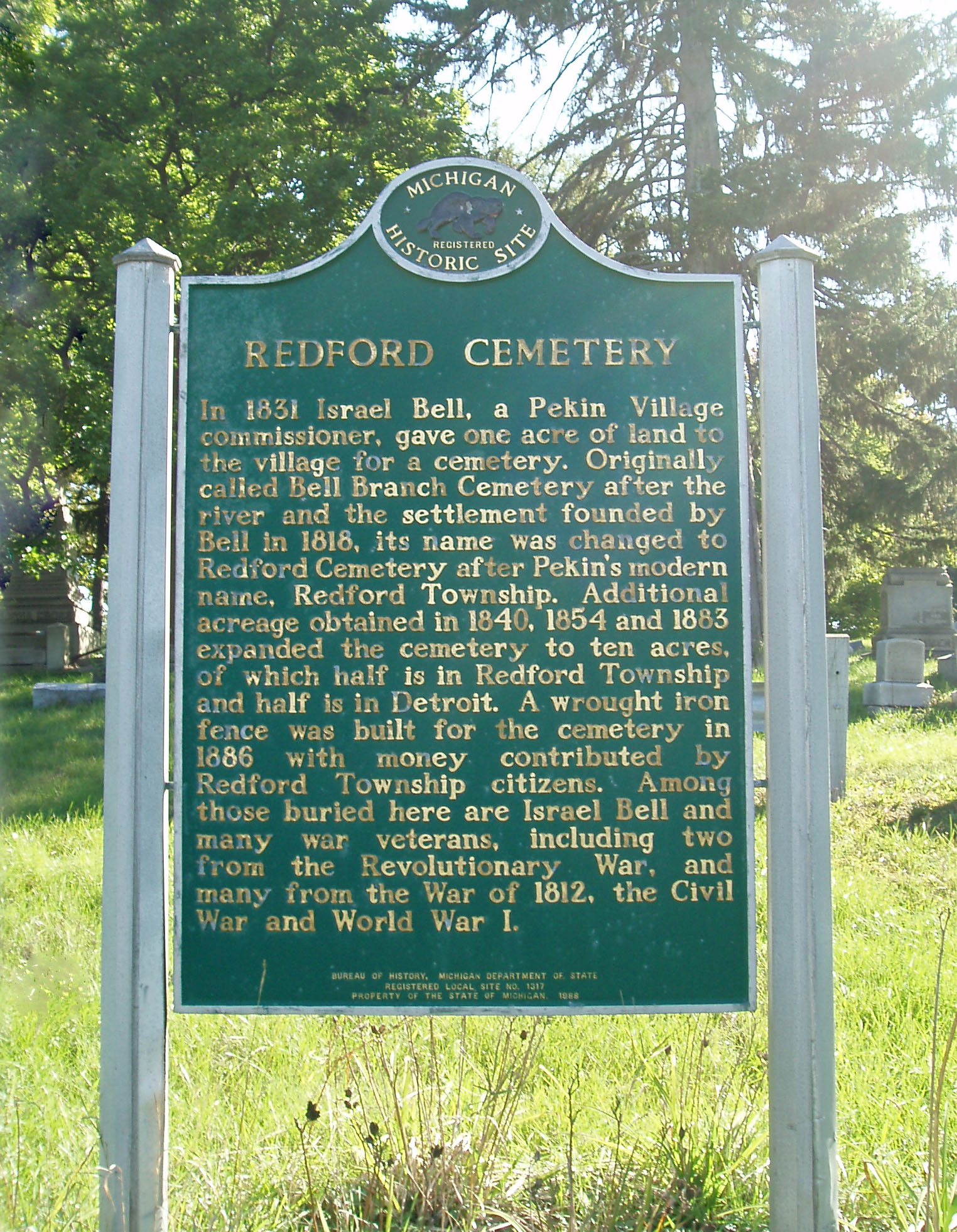
Historic Marker noting Redford Cemetery as a Michigan Historic Site.

On June 13, 1986, Redford Cemetery was listed in the State Register as Michigan Historic Site number 1317. On June 11, 1989, a historic marker was officially placed and dedicated at the cemetery bearing the inscription, "In 1831, Israel Bell, a Pekin Village commissioner, gave one acre of land to the village for a cemetery. Originally called Bell Branch Cemetery after the river and the settlement founded by Bell in 1818, its name was changed to Redford Cemetery after Pekin's modern name, Redford Township. Additional acreage obtained in 1840, 1854 and 1883 expanded the cemetery to ten acres, of which half is in Redford Township and half is in Detroit. A wrought iron fence was built for the cemetery in 1886 with money contributed by Redford Township citizens. Among those buried here are Israel Bell and many war veterans, including two from the Revolutionary War, and many from the War of 1812, the Civil War and World War I."

== Notable burials ==
- Israel Bell (1805–1885) – Early settler, commissioner, and donor of the original Redford Cemetery land.
- Onesimus O. Pierce (1809–1876) – Redford Township supervisor and clerk, later a Michigan state representative from 1/1/1873 until his death.

The cemetery contains the graves of two American Revolutionary War veterans who later migrated to Michigan with younger members of their families

- Ephraim Sr. Dains (1752–1836) – Revolutionary War veteran; served in the Connecticut Militia.
- Darius Smead (1766–1846) – Revolutionary War veteran; served in the New Hampshire Line

== See also ==
- List of cemeteries in Michigan
