= Perrinsville School =

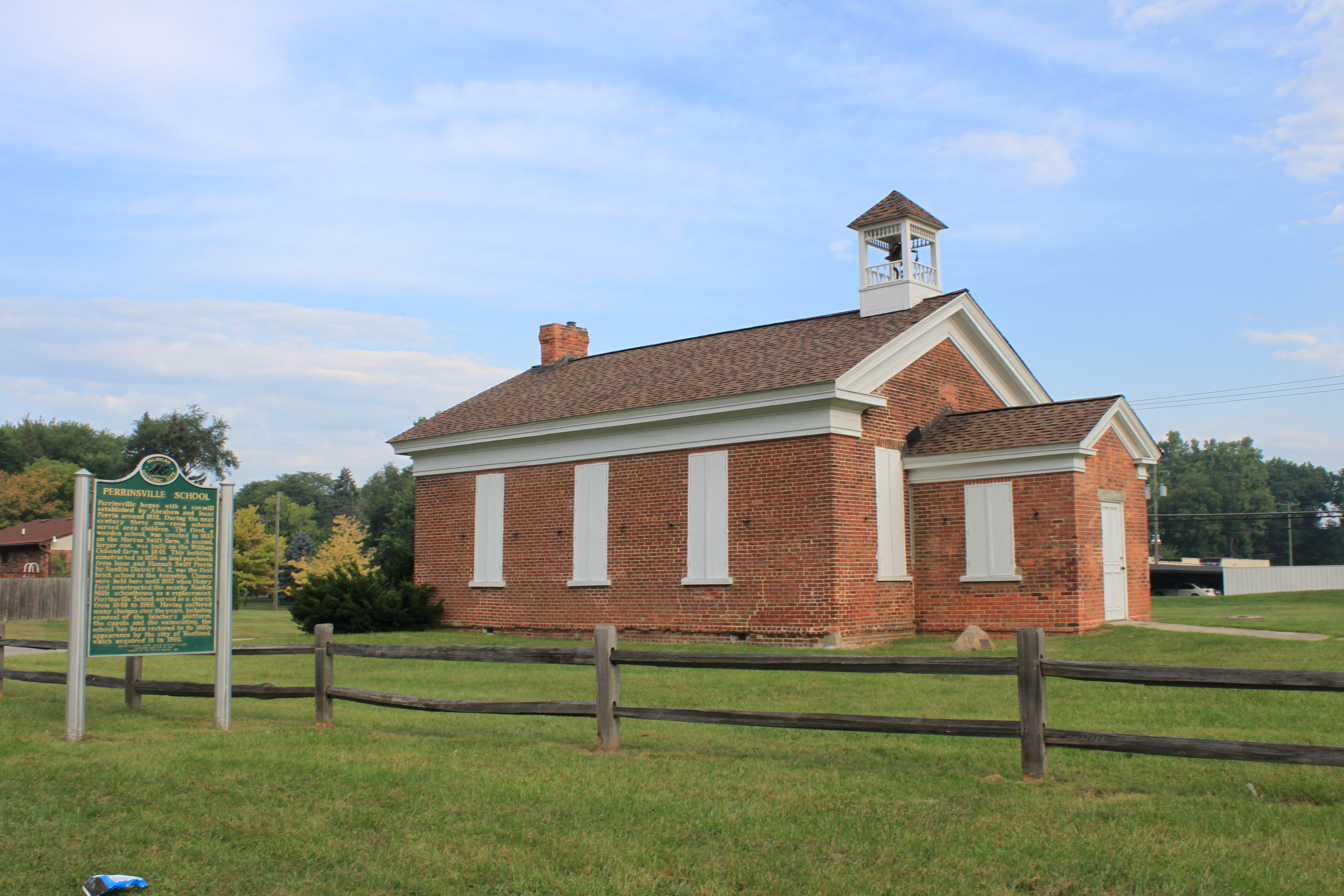

- Location within the state of Michigan
- 42°20′23.4″N 83°21′19.3″W
- Location: 31755 Cowan Road; Westland, Michigan

History
- Built: 1856

Michigan State Historic Site
- Designated: August 29, 1996

Perrinsville School is a historical site in Wayne County in Westland, Michigan. Perrinsville is a one-room schoolhouse that is located on Warren Road and Cowan Road. What is now the city of Westland used to be called the Village of Perrinsville in the 1830s. The main residential streets, Perrin and Liberty are still there today and Perrinsville was first settled by Thomas Dickerson in 1831. The Perrin brothers opened a sawmill in 1832 and several other business opened to help the village of Perrinsville reach peak activity in the 1850s.

- The Perrinsville School Historical Marker says, “Perrinsville began with a sawmill established by Abraham and Isaac Perrin around 1832. During the next century three one-room schools served area children. The first, a wooden school, was erected in 1833 on Marcus Swift farm. A second, larger one, was built on the William Osband farm in 1856 on land purchased from Isaac and Hannah Swift Perrin by Nankin District No. 2, was the first brick school in the township. Classes were held here until 1937 when Henry Ford constructed the nearby Nankin Mills schoolhouse as a replacement. Perrinsville School served as a church from 1948 to 1968. Having suffered many changes over the years, including the removal of the teacher’s platform, the cupola, and the wainscoting, the school has been restored to its 1890s appearance by the city of Westland, which acquired it in 1990.”
- The Perrinsville one-room schoolroom was built in 1856 as a Greek Revival architecture style made with soft red, clay bricks that were made at a nearby brickyard. For eighty-one years, from 1856 to 1937, the school was used for educating the boys and girls of Nankin. In 1937, the school was closed and replaced by another one-room school called Nankin Mills, built by Henry Ford two and half miles away.
- On October 25, 2016, Perrinsville School was relocated from its original location to the historical village located at the City of Livonia's Greenmead Historical Park. The park is located at the southwest corner of Newburgh and Eight Mile Roads.

== Village of Perrinsville ==
- The Perrinsville historical marker says, “The village of Perrinsville was established as a small commercial center during the 1830s. Abraham and Isaac Perrin started a successful sawmill where Merriman Road now crosses the Middle Rouge. Several businesses sprang up and the community became known as Perrinville. About 1850 the village reached its peak of activity with flourishing enterprises on Ann Arbor Trail and Merriman Road. But a railroad built during this era bypassed Perrinville to the south; in 1871 this railroad was intersected at what is now Wayne City by a rail line running from the north. Perrinsville’s distance from these vital transportation lines led to its decline. It became an agricultural area. Absorbed by the city of Westland in 1966, one of Perrinsville’s residential streets, a school, and a store still exist.”
- The American Local History Network of Michigan has a website that has a list of Wayne county townships/communities that do not exist anymore, Perrinsville is listed on it and it says that the name was changed to Pikes Peak December 21, 1882, and that it was in operation until August 30, 1902. A book called Traveling Through Time: A Guide to Michigan's Historical Markers, By Laura Rose Ashlee has information about different historical markers.

== Wayne County ==
- The City of Westland has information about the village of Perrinsville and pictures regarding the one-room school house in the Westland Historical Museum. The historical museum has articles that tell about what life was like for the people that used to go to live In Perrinsville and about that the main cause for the decline was because of the distance from the railroad system. The Perrinsville School was also a huge part of village along with the sawmill, a store, the cabinet shop, blacksmith, and post office. Between the years of 1866 and 1870, Thomas Lathers, had a country store in Perrinsville. The Westland Historical museum has a copy of a book that Thomas Lathers had that has the accounts of about 180 names that were directly related to the pioneer farm families of Nankin and Livonia.
- The Perrinville schoolhouse at Cowan and Warren and the Perrinsville sign at Ann Arbor Trail and Merriman both are Michigan Historical Markers which means that they are recognized by the State of Michigan. The Westland Historical Museum and the Garden City Historical Museum both have information about the Village of Perrinsville, articles about what life was life in the 1830s, and pictures.

"The first train arrived in the Village of Wayne on Feb. 3, 1838. The decision to build the tracks through Wayne raised that village to prominence in Nankin Township and doomed the Village of Perrinsville"

== Historical Schools ==
- Briggs School (District No. 3) - Constructed in 1859 at Six Mile and Newburg (Newburgh) Roads. Even though districts were consolidated in 1944, the school was still used until 1945. In 1964, Briggs was razed to make way for the Newburgh Shopping Plaza.
- Cooper School #1 (Nankin/Fractional District No. 1) - Constructed in 1837 at present-day Ann Arbor Trail & Middlebelt Road; became Fractional District No. 1 for Livonia & Nankin Townships in 1849.
- Cooper School #2 - Constructed in 1865 by the district as a one-room schoolhouse; replaced by Cooper School #3 in 1938.
- Elm School #'s 1 & 2 (District No. 6) - Constructed in 1869 on Middlebelt Road, south of the present-day CSX Transportation line, with an addition during the 1920s. During the 1930s, a second Elm School was constructed, with an addition a few years later. Both schools were razed in the early 1970s for the construction of a General Motors Powertrain plant.
- Livonia Center (Tamarack) School (District No. 4) - Constructed in 1872 on Farmington Road, just south of Five Mile Road. The original school was razed in 1927 for a replacement four-room school on the site. The building is now part of the district Board of Education office.
- Newburg School #1 (Fractional School District No. 8) - Constructed in 1861 at present-day Newburgh & Ann Arbor Roads. The one-room schoolhouse was used until 1922, when it was replaced with Newburg School #2 In 1987, the schoolhouse was moved to Greenmead Historical Park, where it still stands today.
- Newburg School #2 - Constructed in 1922 to replace Newburg School #1; razed in 1974.
- Pearson School (School District No. 2)
- Stark School (School District No. 7)
- Wilcox (Gaffney) School (School District No. 5)

== See also ==
- National Register of Historic Places listings in Wayne County, Michigan
- Saginaw Trail
