= Dearborn Hills =

Historic golf course in Michigan

Coordinates: 42°18′04″N 83°16′28″W

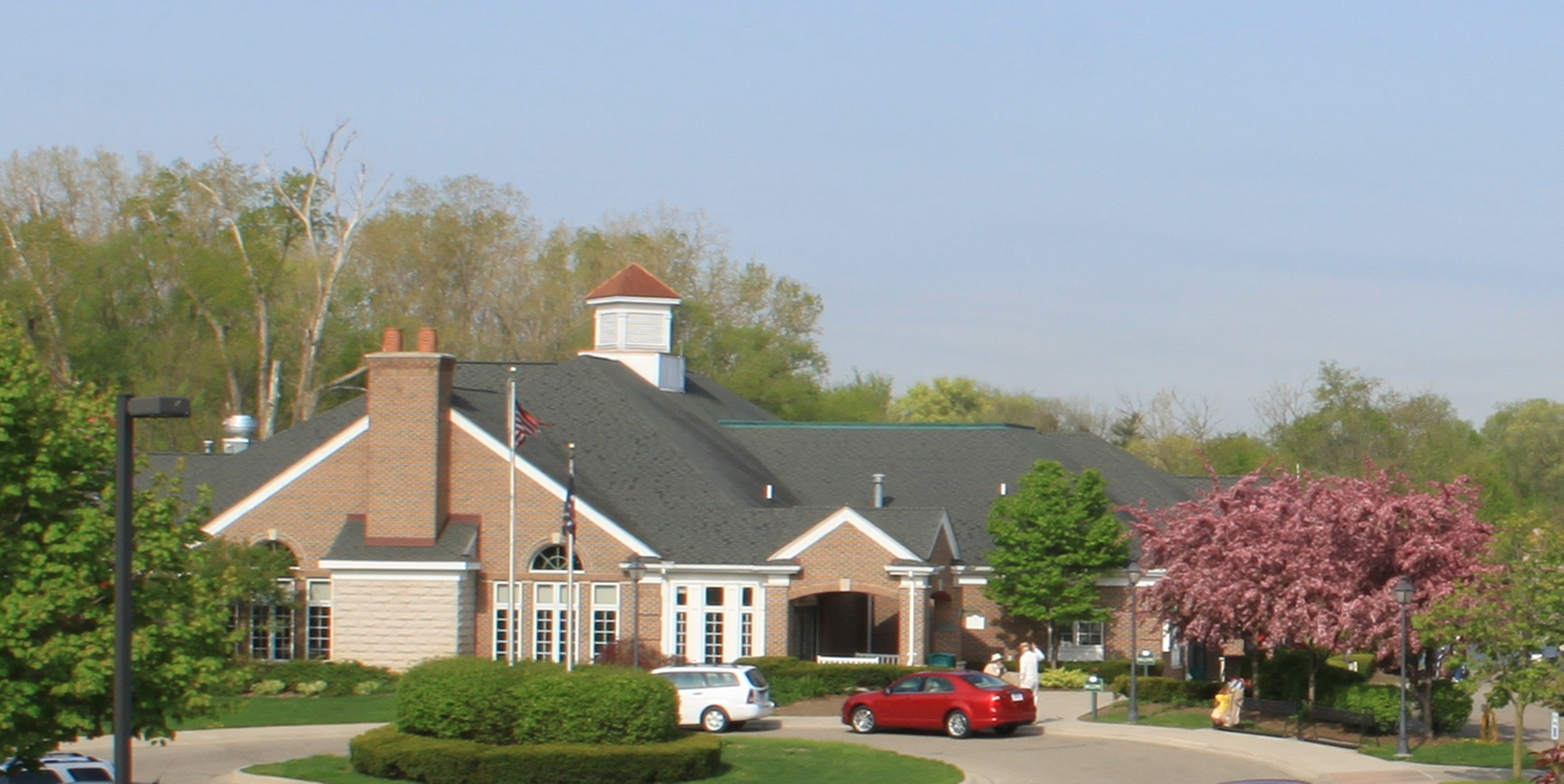
Dearborn Hills Golf Course clubhouse Michigan

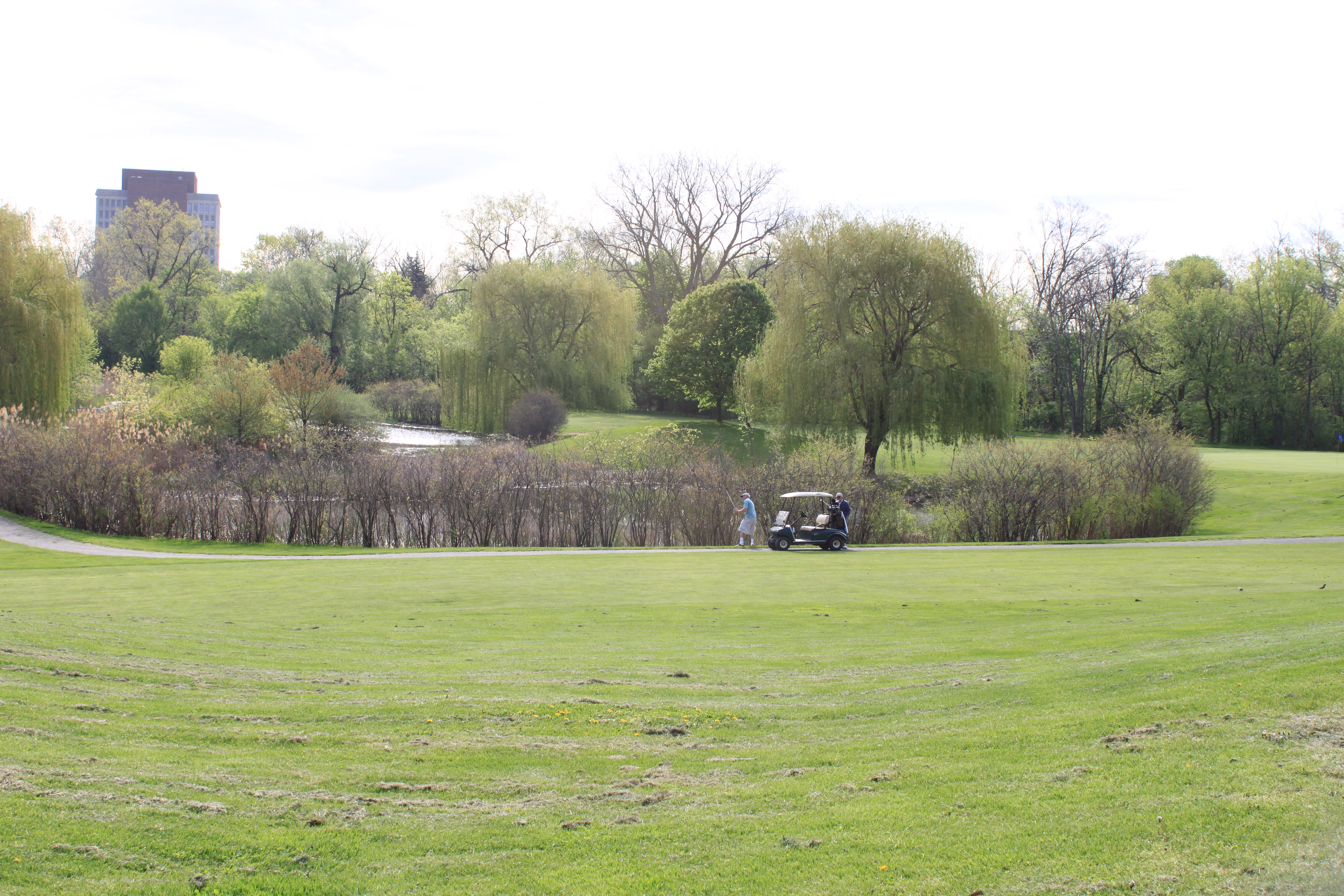
Dearborn Hills Golf Course greens Michigan

Dearborn Hills is a golf course built in 1922–23 by the late Robert Herndon, a prominent local developer and benefactor. After Herndon's death in 1986, his widow deeded the course to the city. It is reputed to be Michigan's oldest public golf course and is listed in the State Register of Historic Sites. In the summer of 1991 it closed to undergo a nearly $5 million renovation and expansion. It has a rating of on GolfNow.
