= Alexander Chapoton House =

Historic house in Michigan, United States

- U.S. National Register of Historic Places
- Michigan State Historic Site
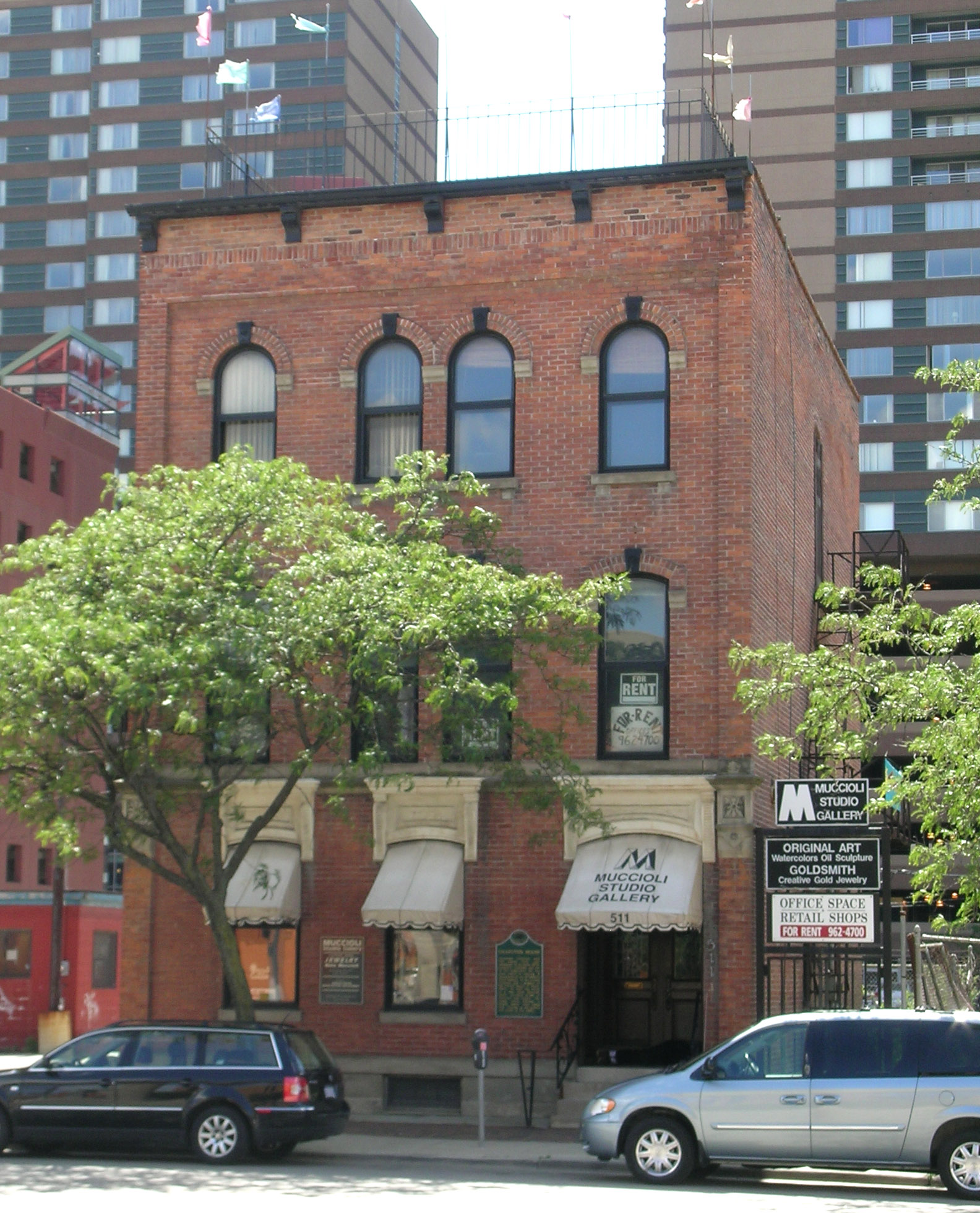
- Interactive map
- Location: 511 Beaubien Street; Detroit, Michigan
- Coordinates: 42°19′54″N 83°2′26″W
- Built: 1885
- Architect: Alexander Chapoton
- Architectural style: Queen Anne
- NRHP reference No.: 80001919

Significant dates
- Added to NRHP: March 10, 1980
- Designated MSHS: April 21, 1980

The Alexander Chapoton House is a Queen Anne style row house located at 511 Beaubien Street in Downtown Detroit, Michigan. It was listed on the National Register of Historic Places and designated a Michigan State Historic Site in 1980.

== Alexander Chapoton ==
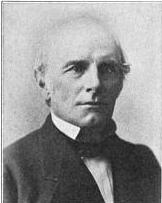
Alexander Chapoton

Alexander Chapoton was a descendant of one of the oldest Detroit families. His ancestor Jean Chapoton was a surgeon in the French army, and was assigned to Fort Pontchartrain, arriving in 1719. Jean remained in Detroit until his death in 1762.

Years later, Jean's descendant Alexander Chapoton inherited his father Eustache's masonry business and a fortune to go along with it. He later expanded his business and became an important contractor in Detroit, helping to build several commercial blocks and residences, including the Globe Tobacco Building. He was the first Chairman of the Builders' and Traders' Exchange of Detroit (now known as the Construction Association of Michigan), serving 1885-1886. He also served on the Water Board and was appointed to a commission that selected an architect for the Michigan state capitol. Chapoton's son, Alexander Jr., joined the family business and eventually inherited a greater fortune than his father had.

Chapoton built this house in the late 1870s as rental property. However, Chapoton himself lived in the home until his death in 1893.

== House ==
The house is a three-story brick building with its foundation placed at the edge of the sidewalk. The stone-faced basement raises the first floor several feet off the ground. The facade is asymmetrical, with a three-bay first floor upper floors of differing height. The brick and stone hoods over the windows vary from floor to floor. It is believed that the first and second stories were once separated by cast iron panels which were removed during renovation.

The interior floor plan is unusual, having space for Victorian Living hall. The interior still retains the original trim, staircase and parlor fireplace.

== Later years ==
When this house was built, it was one of a row of similar homes on Beaubien. In the years following the house's construction, the area around it was cleared for commercial development. The development was especially prevalent in the 1960s and 1970s; as a result, only a few row houses remain. The Alexander Chapoton House is one of the last examples of Queen Anne style row houses in the city.

The house was used as a rooming house for several decades. In the 1980s, it was purchased and renovated. Currently, the first floor is art gallery, studios are located in the basement and offices are on the upper floors.
