= Wilson Barn =

United States historic place, Ira Wilson Dairy Barn

- U.S. National Register of Historic Places
- Michigan State Historic Site
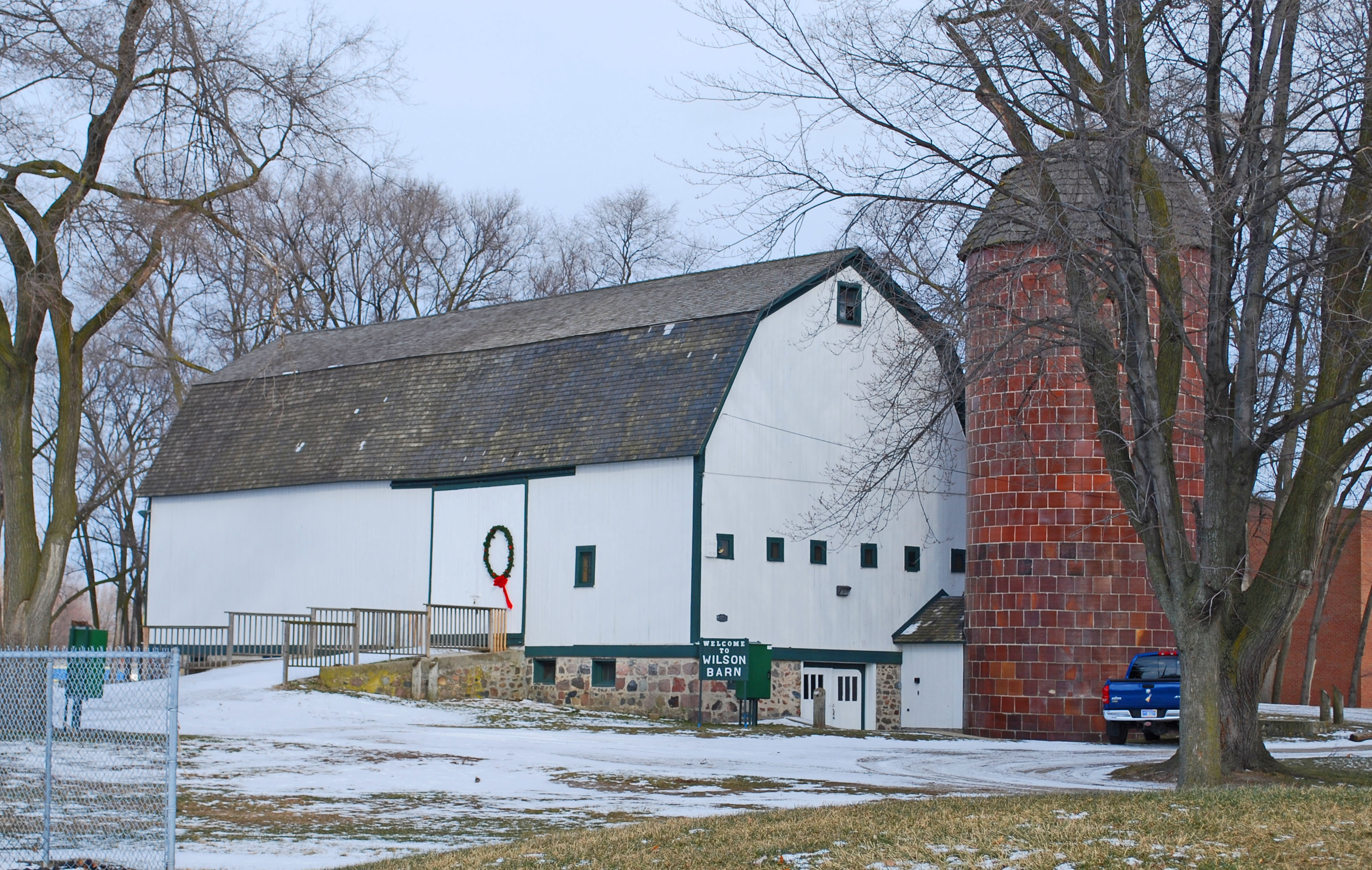

- Location within Michigan Location within the United States
- Interactive map
- Location: NE corner of Middlebelt and W. Chicago Rds., Livonia, Michigan
- Coordinates: 42°21′53″N 83°19′55″W
- Area: 4.8 acres (1.9 ha)
- Built: 1888
- Architect: John H. Paterson
- Architectural style: Bank Barn
- NRHP reference No.: 73000962

Significant dates
- Added to NRHP: December 12, 1973
- Designated MSHS: November 15, 1973

The Wilson Barn (also known as the Ira Wilson Dairy Barn) is a barn located at the northeast corner of Middlebelt and W. Chicago Roads in Livonia, Michigan right by Emerson Middle School. It was listed on the National Register of Historic Places and designated a Michigan State Historic Site in 1973. This was the beginning of the Ira Wilson & Sons Dairy Company, a now defunct company (which partnered for a time with Kroger and was ultimately acquired by Melody Farms in 1980). There were several large iconic cow's head sculptures, which were fixtures in the Detroit metropolitan area.

== History ==
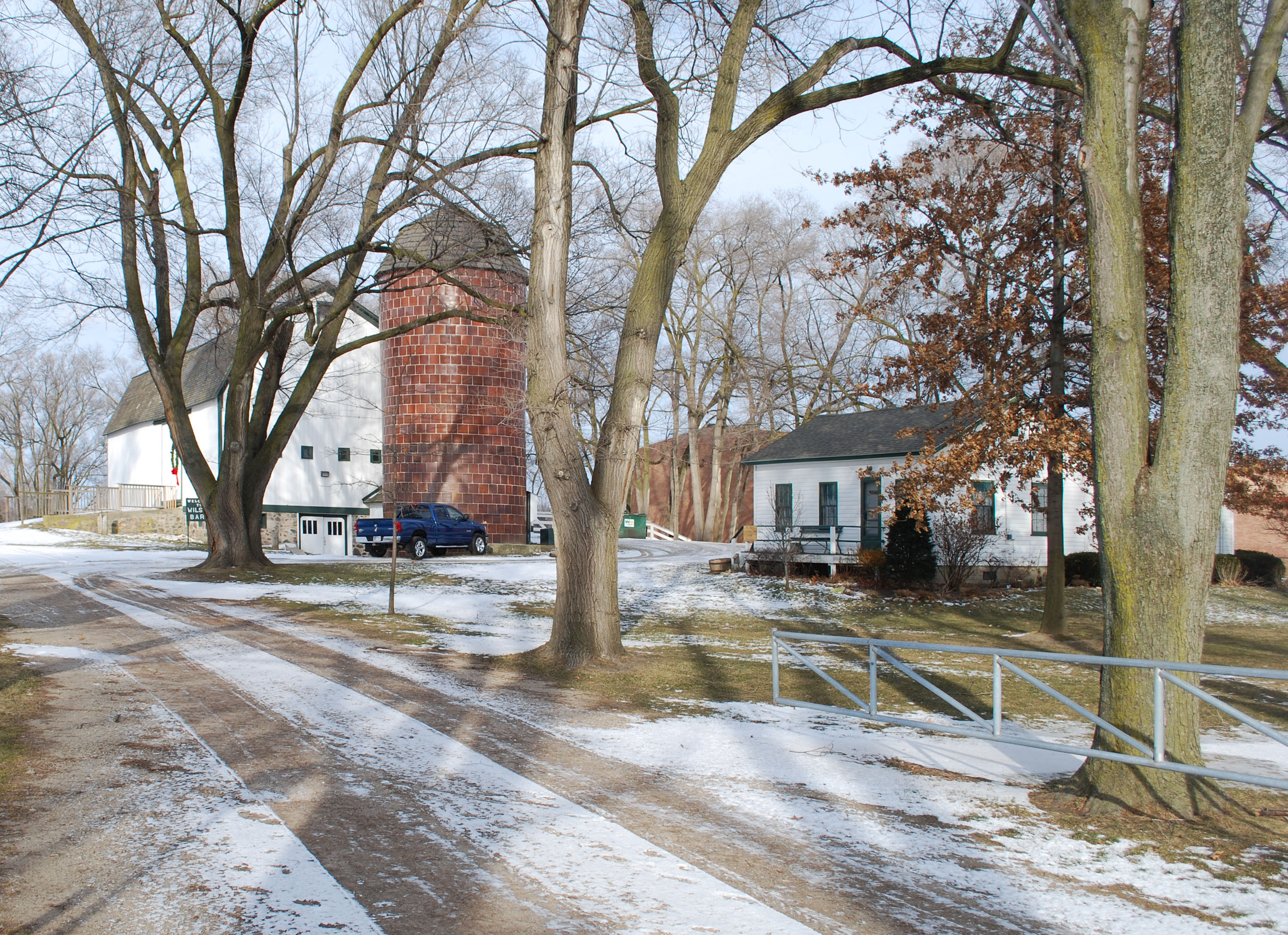
Farmyard with barn and house

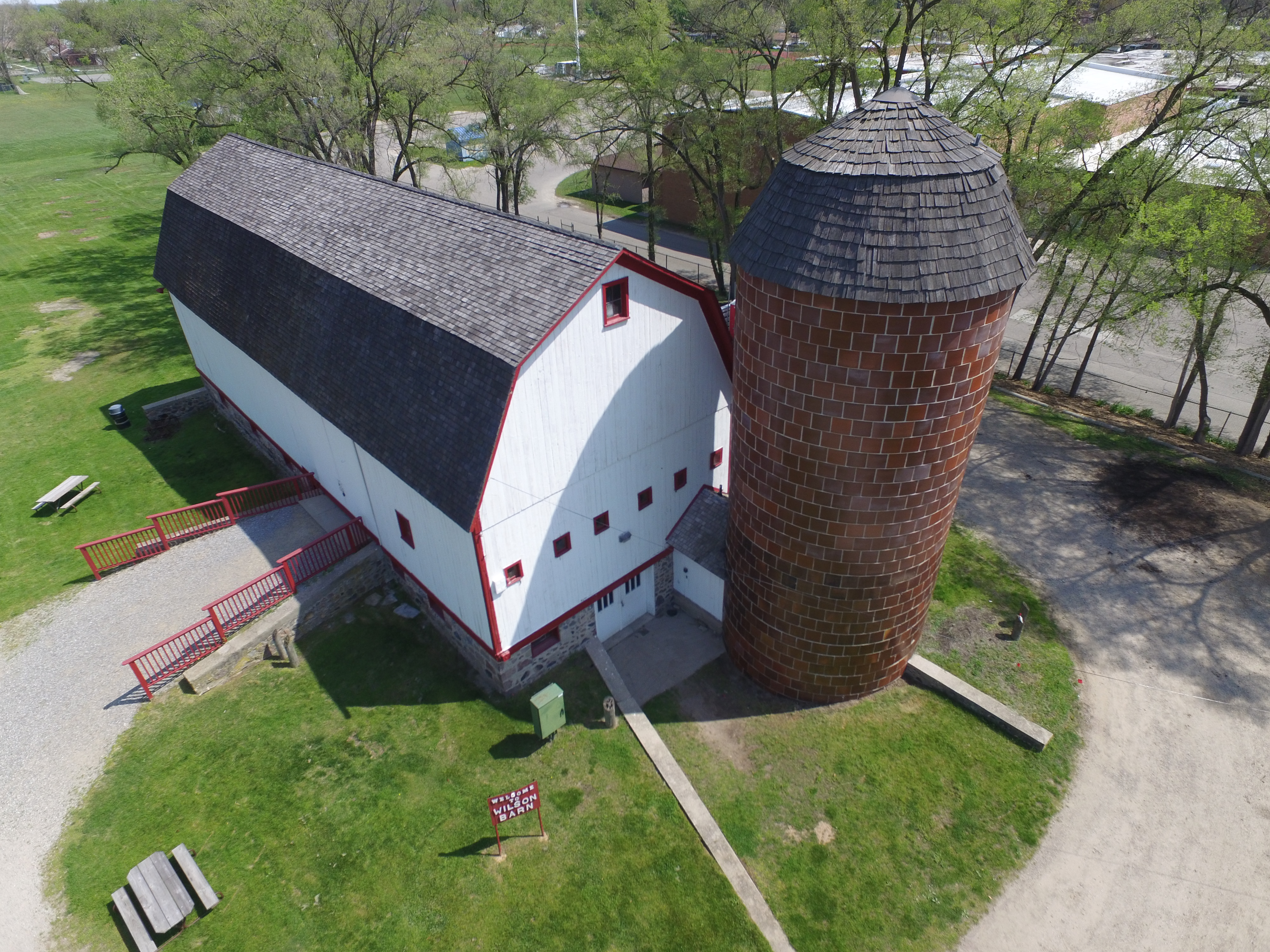
Barn and silo aerial

Ira Wilson was born in 1867, and began his career in dairy farming at an early age, working on the farm owned by his family since 1847. He built a barn on this site in 1888; in 1919 the barn burned and he built the present structure on the foundations of the earlier barn. Wilson eventually established a million-dollar dairy, creamery, and trucking business, the Ira Wilson & Sons Dairy, and served for two terms as Wayne County sheriff. Wilson died in 1944, and the lower level of the barn was converted for use as a horse stable in the same year.

As of 2011, the Wilson Barn is managed by "The Friends of the Barn," a volunteer group.

== Description ==
The barn is a post-and-beam structure faced with wood siding, resting on a stone foundation and having a gambrel roof. A silo made of dark brown, glazed tile is attached to the barn.

== Events ==
The friends of the Wilson Barn host many events at the barn including a farmers market every saturday from the first Saturday in June until October, pumpkinfest, a twice monthly community board game night, an annual chess tournament, and other various events including 2 car shows.
