= Frederic M. Sibley Lumber Company Office Building =

- U.S. National Register of Historic Places
- Michigan State Historic Site
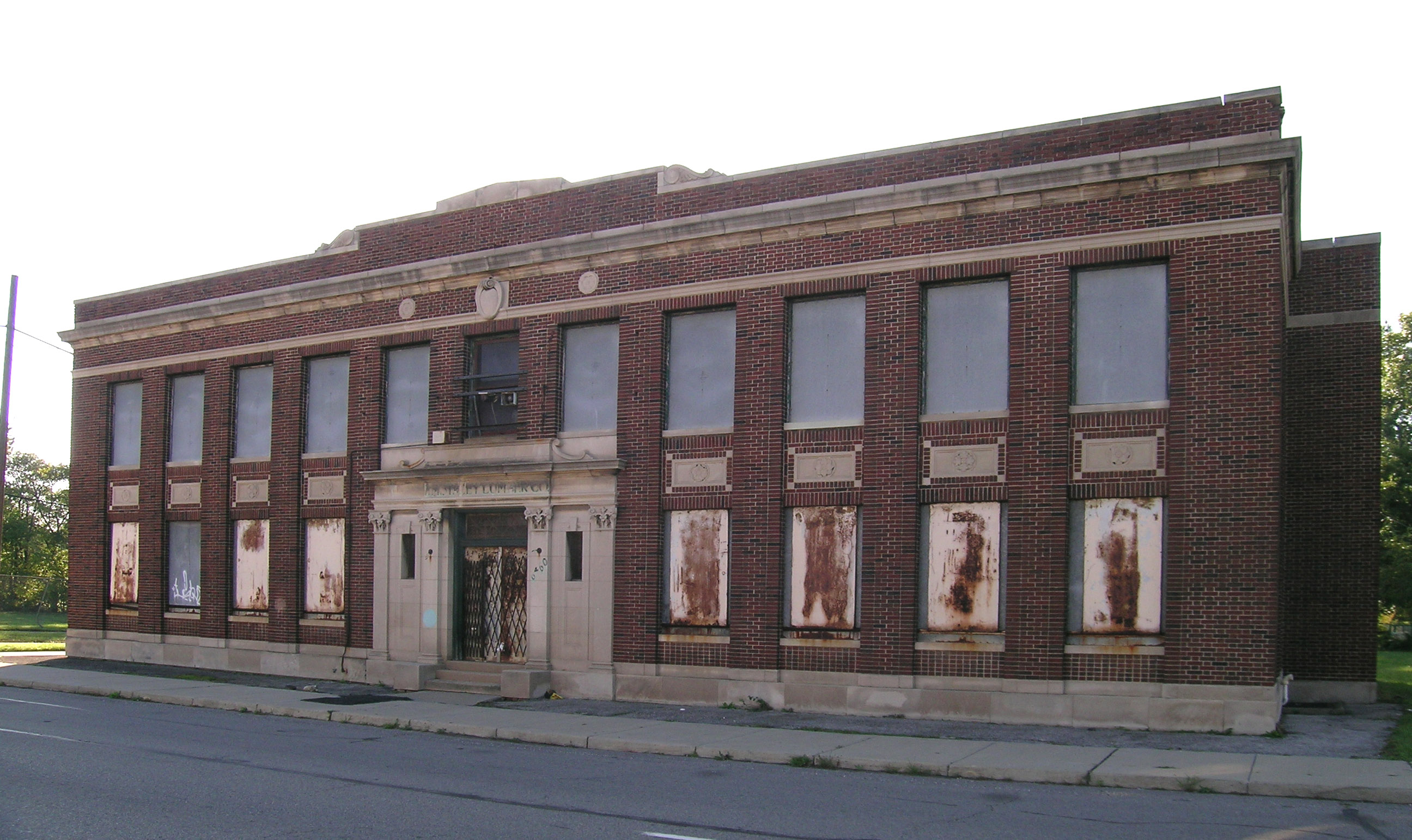
- Interactive map
- Location: 6460 Kercheval Avenue; Detroit, Michigan
- Coordinates: 42°21′11″N 83°0′49″W
- Area: less than one acre
- Built: 1917
- Architect: Baxter, O'Dell & Halprin
- Architectural style: Classical Revival
- NRHP reference No.: 91000329

Significant dates
- Added to NRHP: April 4, 1991
- Designated MSHS: April 20, 1989

The Frederic M. Sibley Lumber Company Office Building is an office building located at 6460 Kercheval Avenue in Detroit, Michigan. It was designated a Michigan State Historic Site in 1989 and listed on the National Register of Historic Places in 1991. The building is known for being the beginning of a major trailer manufacturing company.

== Frederic M. Sibley ==
Frederic M. Sibley was born in Detroit in late October, 1883. As an adult, he joined his father's lumber company and acted as treasurer until his father's death in 1912, after which he assumed the presidency of the firm. In 1922, the Sibley Lumber Company employed 400 people and was the second largest lumber firm in Detroit.

Sibley married Mabel Bessenger in August 1910. They had five children: Josephine, Frederic Jr., Dorothy, Suzanne, and Joy.

Sibley is also known for his cooperation with August Fruehauf in developing the first semi-trailers to haul lumber. Sibley, approached August Fruehauf, his blacksmith about modifying a wagon to transport an 18' boat. Sibley wanted to use his Model-T roadster rather than a slow moving horse and wagon. August Fruehauf and his partner, Otto Neumann took several days to devise a solution. They removed the back seat of the Model-T to support the front end of the wagon and fashioned a 5th wheel coupling to attach the wagon to the back of the automobile. August called it a semi-trailer. Sibley was impressed with the solution and ordered additional semi-trailers for his lumber company. Henry Ford canceled the warrantee on the modified Model T's. August Fruehauf turned this invention into a goldmine. The Fruehauf Corporation manufactured these trailers for many years afterward.

== Description ==
The Frederic M. Sibley Lumber Company Office Building was constructed in a Neo-Classical style in 1925. The two-story building is red brick, trimmed with limestone, and the legend "F. M. Sibley Lumber Co." is carved in the limestone lintel above the entrance. The façade is divided into eleven bays, each separated by a brick pillar. Rectangular transoms within each bay separate the two stories. Four limestone pilasters with Corinthian capitals surround the entrance, flanked by two vertical recessed lights.
