= St. Boniface Roman Catholic Church =

Historic church in Michigan, United States

- Formerly listed on the U.S. National Register of Historic Places
- Michigan State Historic Site
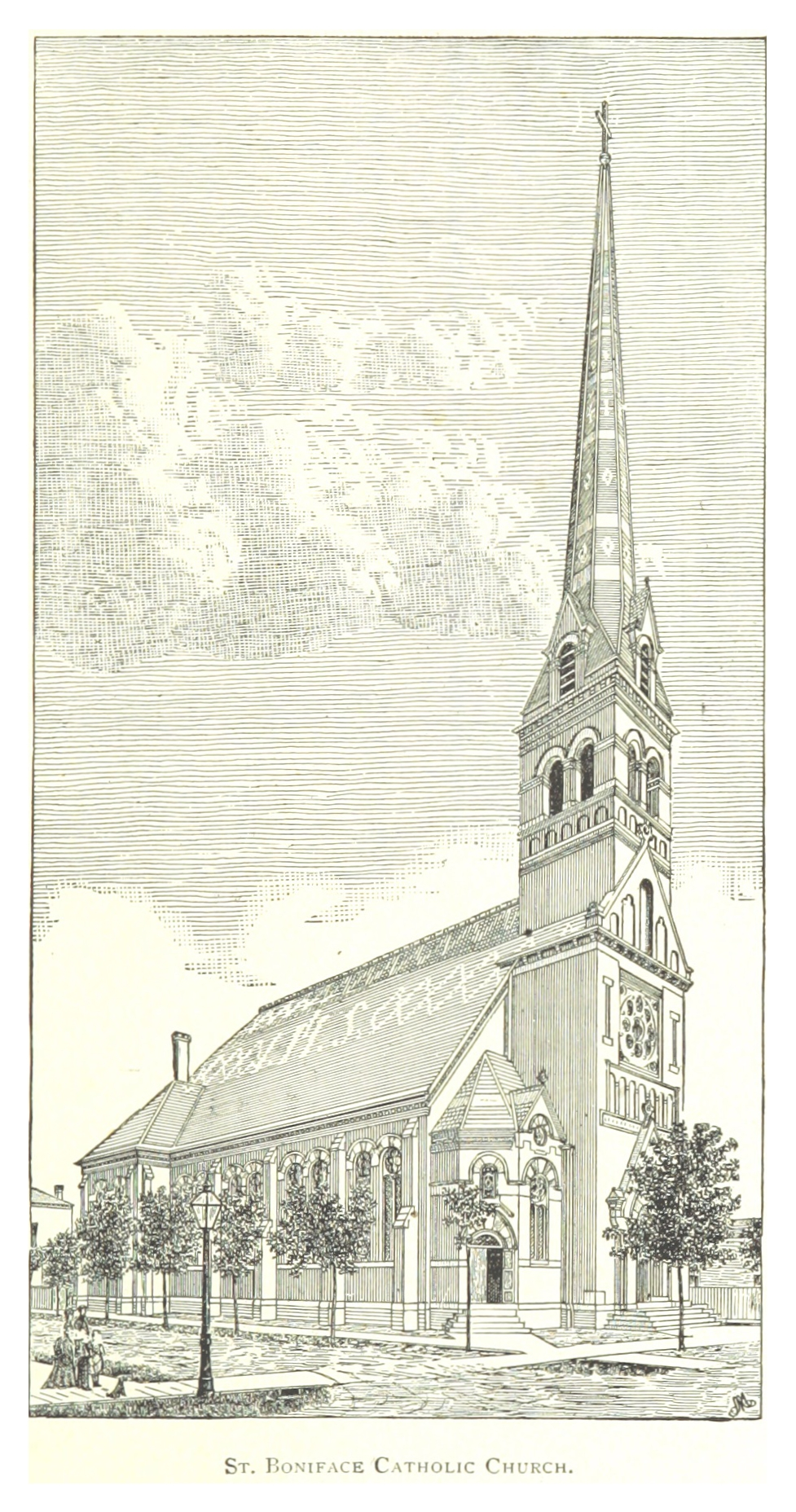
- St. Boniface Roman Catholic Church, c. 1884
- Interactive map
- Location: 2356 Vermont Avenue; Detroit, Michigan
- Coordinates: 42°19′57″N 83°4′26″W
- Built: 1882
- Architect: Scott, William & Co.; Wuestewald, Caspar
- Architectural style: Romanesque Revival
- Demolished: November 1996
- NRHP reference No.: 89000487

Significant dates
- Added to NRHP: June 09, 1989
- Designated MSHS: March 23, 1983
- Removed from NRHP: August 8, 2022

St. Boniface Roman Catholic Church was a Roman Catholic church located at 2356 Vermont Avenue in Detroit, Michigan. It was also known as St. Boniface-St. Vincent Roman Catholic Church. The church was designated a Michigan State Historic Site in 1983 and listed on the National Register of Historic Places in 1989, but was subsequently demolished in 1996. The church was removed from the NRHP in 2022.

== History and significance ==
The German Catholic citizens of Detroit began moving to the west side in the 1860s, particularly along the Michigan Avenue corridor. In 1867, Bishop Casper Borgess created St. Boniface parish to serve the German population on the west side. In 1873, a two-story, red brick Italianate rectory building was built for the parish at a cost of $6,000. A stone church building was planned by the prominent local architect William M. Scott, and construction was completed in 1883 at a cost of $30,000.

The parish was closed in 1989, and the building was demolished in 1996.

== Description ==
St. Boniface Church was an eclectic example of Romanesque Revival and Ruskinian Gothic architecture. It was built in a cruciform shape from red brick and cream-painted wood, and featured a high nave roof, steeply gabled stone entry arches, and a central pavilion with recessed round arches. The church had a square, louvered bell tower with an octagonal metal roof. The side walls were supported by heavy, stone-embellished buttresses. The rectory was a two-story Italianate stone building, painted black. It had a modified hip-roof with cross-gabled dormers and a bracketed corniceline, an open gabled portico, and rectangular and round arch window enframements.

== Gallery ==
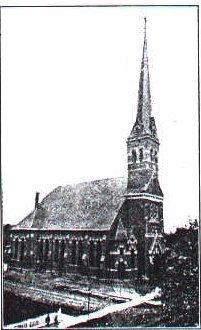
St. Boniface Roman Catholic Church, c. 1910

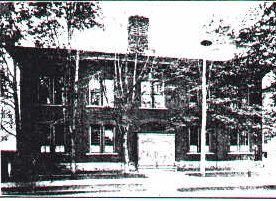
St. Boniface School, c. 1910

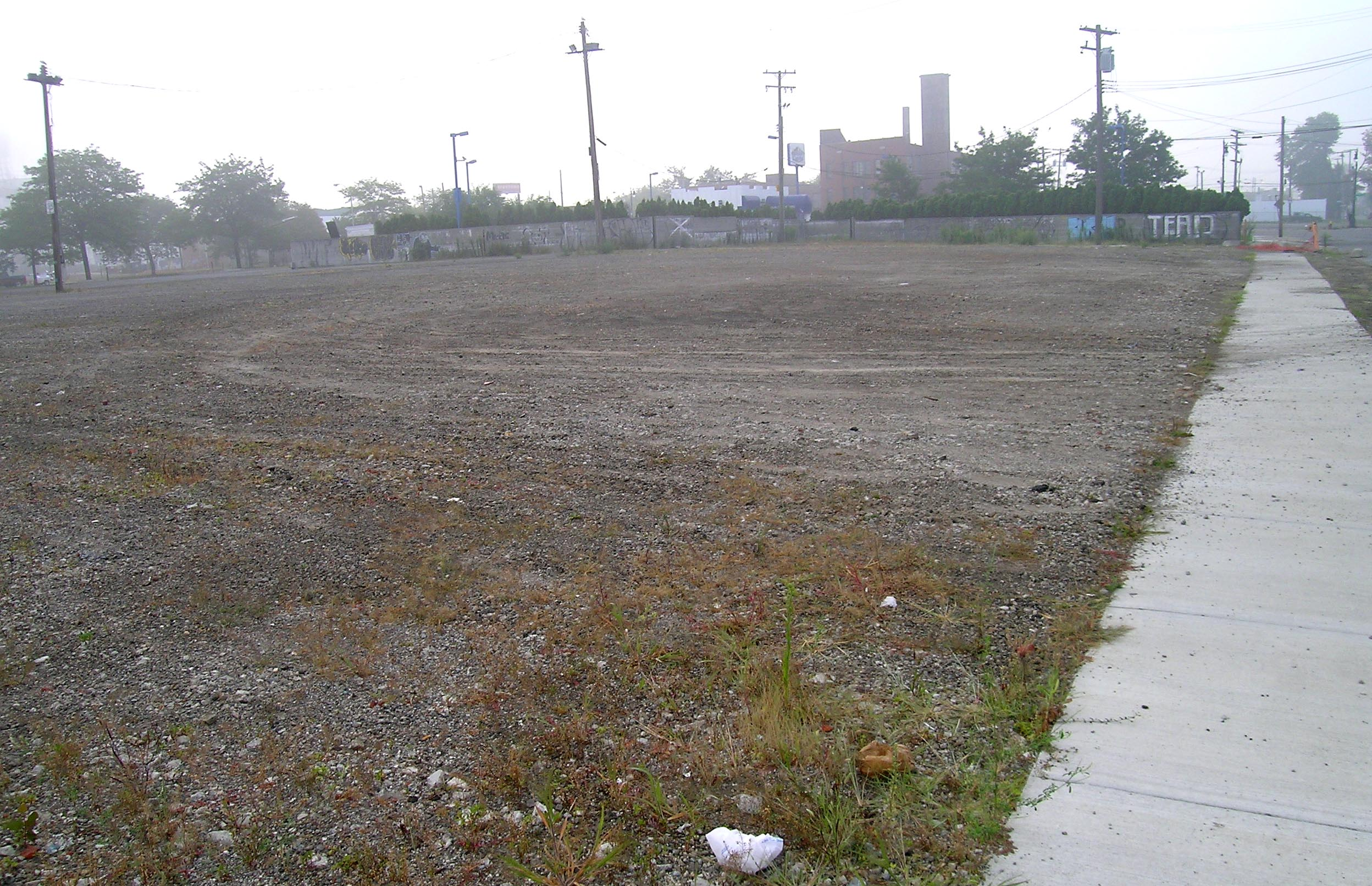
Lot where St. Boniface Roman Catholic Church once stood
