= Highland Park General Hospital =

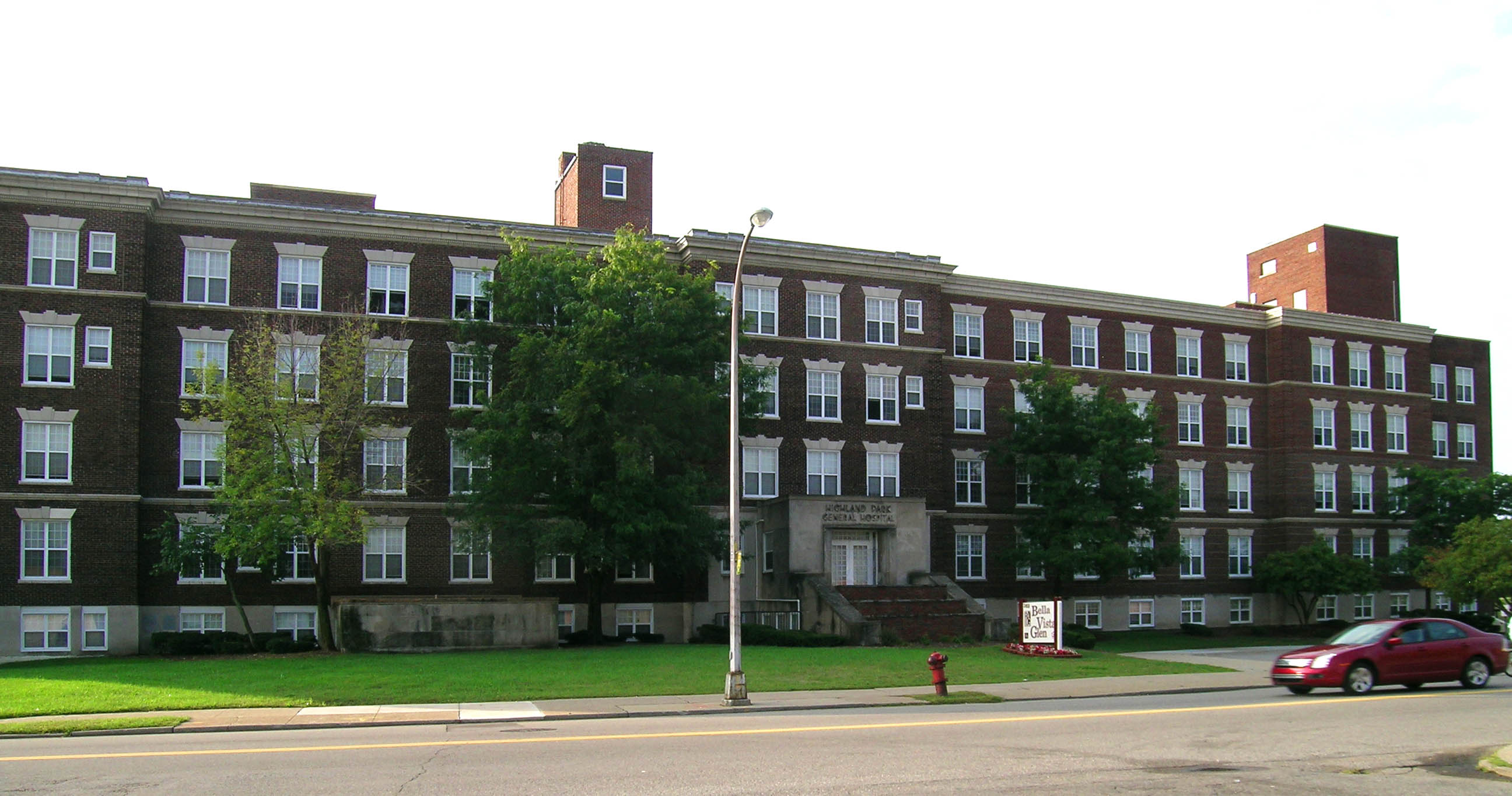

Geography
- Location: 369 Glendale Ave., Highland Park, Michigan, Michigan, United States
- Coordinates: 42°23′41″N 83°6′19″W

Organization
- Type: General

History
- Opened: 1921
- Closed: 1976

Links
- Lists: Hospitals in Michigan
- Highland Park General Hospital
- U.S. National Register of Historic Places
- Michigan State Historic Site
- Built: 1918
- Architect: Meyer Joseph Sturm
- Architectural style: Late 19th And 20th Century Revivals
- NRHP reference No.: 85003400

Significant dates
- Added to NRHP: October 31, 1985
- Designated MSHS: March 5, 1979

The Highland Park General Hospital is a former hospital complex located at 357 Glendale Avenue in Highland Park, Michigan. It was closed in 1976 and designated a Michigan State Historic Site in 1979 and listed on the National Register of Historic Places in 1985. The hospital primarily served African Americans. The building was later renovated into apartments, and is now the Bella Vista Glen Senior Apartments.

== Description ==
The Highland Park General Hospital sits on a 6-acre (2.4 ha) at the western edge of Highland Park, in an area that is primarily residential. The complex includes three separate buildings. The primary building faces Glendale, and includes the original hospital building, built in 1918, and the attached nurses' residence (1925). The other two buildings are located behind the main unit, and consist of the power plant/laundry buildings (builtin in 1921 and 1940, respectively) and the Contagious and Psychopathic Units (built in 1926).

This complex of buildings was developed to be a coherent assemblage, united by a common use of materials, utilitarian design, and hierarchical relationship. The buildings constructed before World War II are detailed in a neo-Georgian style characteristic of the early 20th century period of construction, while elements built in the postwar era have no historical or ornamental detailing.

== History ==
The Highland Park General Hospital is a significant landmark in the history of Highland Park. The hospital was one of the first two institutions established when Highland Park incorporated as a city in 1916. The main building was constructed in the period from 1918 to 1921, and the growth and usage of the hospital contributed to the strong municipal identity of Highland Park, particularly as Detroit grew and annexed the surrounding suburbs. The Highland Park General Hospital served the city as a hospital until its closing in 1976. The building remained vacant until 1986, when it was purchased and renovated into apartments. It now serves as the Bella Vista Glen Senior Apartments.

Voice actor Billy West was born at the hospital in April 1952.
