= Frederick Linsell House =

Coordinates: 42.35655°N 83.06923°W

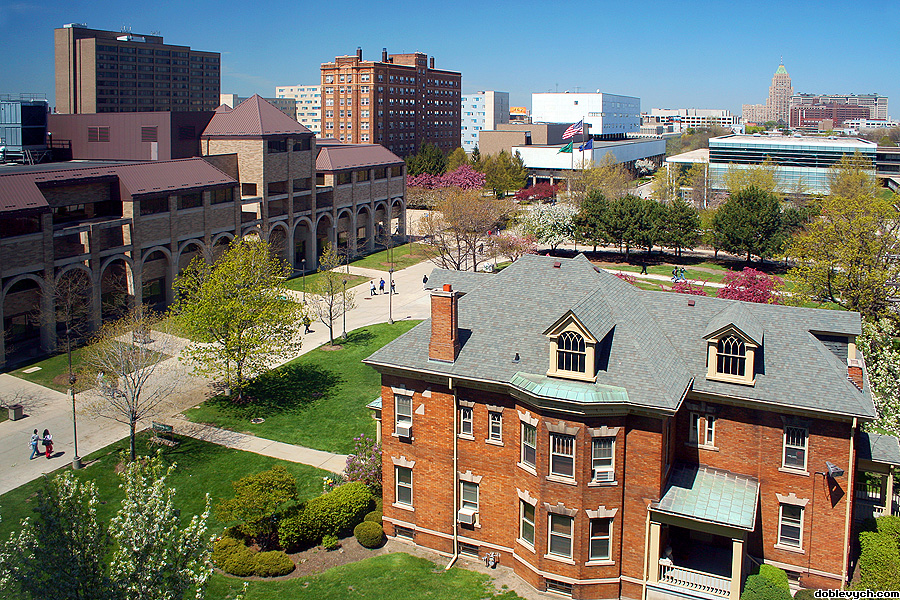
Frederick Linsell House

Frederick Linsell House is a two-story Georgian style building on the campus of Wayne State University in Detroit, Michigan, United States. The house was one of the first residences that Wayne converted to educational use, and is now the Dean's Office for the university's College of Fine Performing and Communication Arts.

== History ==
Originally located on the corner of 2nd and Putnam, the two-story Georgian style home was constructed in 1904 for Frederick Linsell (1847-1938), secretary treasurer of the William Wright Company furniture decorating firm, and his wife Rosa. The architect, John C. Stahl (1874–1951), crafted the house to Linsell's specifications by incorporating fine woods and Georgian-style windows in his design, which was built at the cost of $9,000. The Linsells lived there for 10 years before selling it.

After serving as a home for two more families, the building was bought by the Detroit Board of Education in the 1930s. In 1939 the building became the Women's Study Building for the university. It was the only building of 16 on its block that survived the expansion of Wayne State's campus in the mid-1900s. In 1956 the Board of Education donated the Linsell House to the university; it became the office for the School of Business, and later the Biology Department. In 1987 the house was restored and turned into the Dean's Office for the College of Fine Performing and Communication Arts. The 13-room house is now located at 5104 Gullen Mall, in the middle of the Wayne State campus.

== Exterior features ==
The Linsell House is an example of 20th century colonial architecture. The two-story brick structure is in Georgian style with a palladian window positioned over its front portico. The windows are framed in stone, and it has two chimneys asymmetrically placed on its Georgian hip roof.

== Interior features ==
The Linsell House has 13 rooms with paneling and oak woodwork from its original construction. It retains its original expansive staircase in good condition. Although the house was restored, its features did not change.
