= Northville Historic District =

Historic district in Michigan, United States

- U.S. National Register of Historic Places
- U.S. Historic district
- Michigan State Historic Site
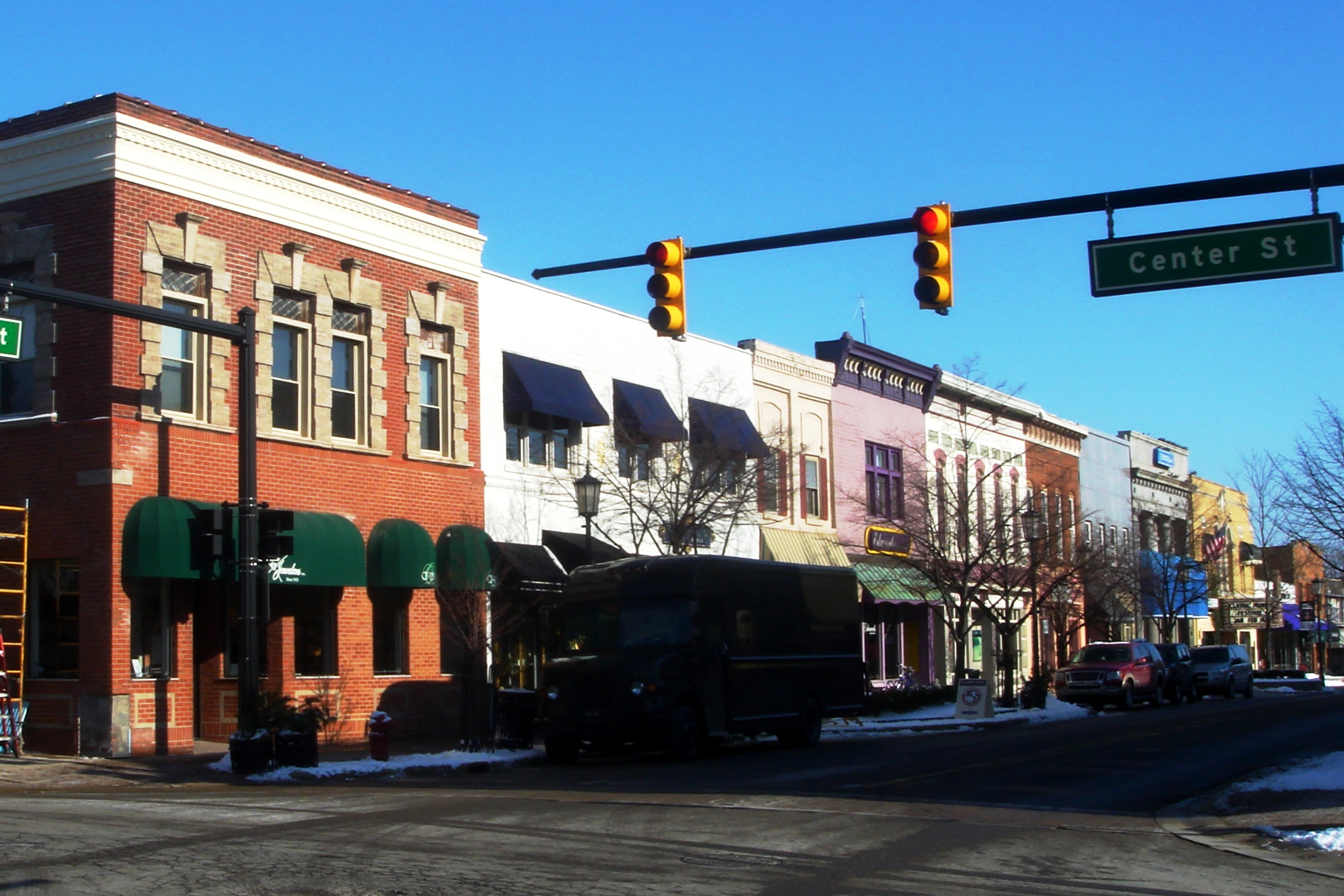

- Location within Michigan Location within the United States
- Interactive map
- Location: Bounded roughly by Cady, Rogers, and Randolph Sts., Northville, Michigan
- Coordinates: 42°25′54″N 83°29′3″W
- Architectural style: Greek Revival, Queen Anne, Gothic Revival
- NRHP reference No.: 72000673

Significant dates
- Added to NRHP: July 31, 1972
- Designated MSHS: December 11, 1970

The Northville Historic District is located in Northville, Michigan. It was designated a Michigan State Historic Site in 1970 and listed on the National Register of Historic Places in 1972. The district is roughly bounded by Cady Street, Rogers Street, and Randolph Street; alterations to the boundaries of the city-designated district in 2003 and 2007 included structures on the opposite sides of the original bounding streets within the district. The district is located in the heart of old Northville, and is primarily residential, although the 73 contributing structures, include several commercial buildings and a church. The majority of the district contains Gothic Revival houses constructed between 1860 and 1880.

== Architecture ==
The most significant structures in the district include:

- First Baptist Church (209 N. Wing) - This church was founded in 1841. The present site of the church building was obtained by the congregation in 1844, and construction began in 1859.
- Masonic Hall (106 E. Main) - In 1880, the first story of this commercial structure was built by Barton Wheeler. The Masonic Lodge constructed and occupied the floor, resulting in the two stories of the building being owned by two separate parties.
- Freydl Stores (112 and 118 E. Main) - These commercial buildings were constructed in 1875.
- Oakwood Cemetery (W. Cady) - The Oakwood Cemetery was established early in Northville's history, and is located on land donated by Daniel Cady and Martin Randolph.
- Ambler House (473 W. Cady) - The Ambler House was built in 1840, and is a transitional Greek Revival style.
- Methodist Parsonage (139 Dunlap) - The Parsonage was built in 1890 for William and Georgina Yerkes. The house is one of the few Queen Anne style structures in the district.
- Alfred Heatley Residence (304 Dunlap) - The Alfred Heatley house, built in the 1870s, is a Victorian-style Gothic house. A wide porch was added to the structure in approximately 1910.
- Dean Griswold House (317 Dunlap) - The Dean Griswold House is a brick Italianate structure built in 1882.
- Dr. Manfred Lampe Residence (417 Dunlap) - The Lampe Residence is a cottage Gothic home built in the late 1860s or 1870s.

== Mill Race Village ==
Two of the most significant structures in the district have been moved to the adjacent Mill Race Village, which was established in 1972 as a location where buildings slated for demolition could be moved. These two are:

- The Cady Inn (formerly at 315 E. Cady) - This house was built about 1835, and is one of the oldest houses in Northville. It was moved to its Cady Street location sometime in the latter half of the 19th century, and moved again to the Mill Race Village in 1987. The saltbox style house was believed to have been a tavern and a stop on the Underground Railroad.
- The Yerkes House (formerly 164 E. Cady) - The Yerkes House was built around 1859 by Henry Wade, the finest area carpenter, for William Purdy Yerkes, the first village president. The house has nine rooms, and the Gothic carpentry is in excellent shape.
