= Mill Race (Eugene) =

Stream in Eugene, Oregon, US

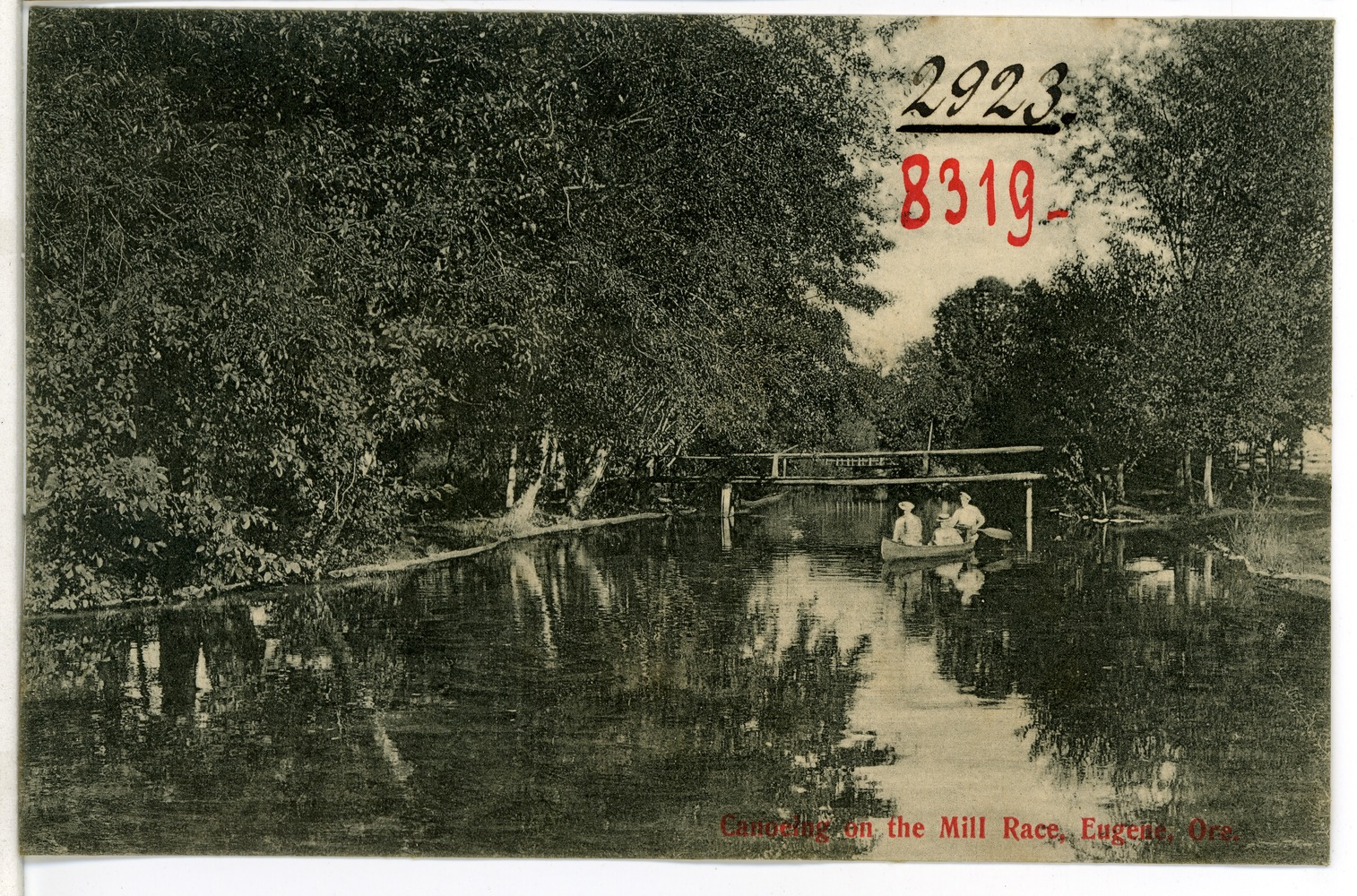
The Mill Race in 1906

The Mill Race or millrace is a channel off the Willamette River in Eugene. The stream was once an integral part of life for many Eugene residents and University students. It contributed to the industrial beginnings of the city and as the site of some of the University of Oregon’s traditions.

== History ==
The Eugene Mill & Elevator was constructed in 1895.

The millrace was the vision of Hillyard Shaw, an early settler of area who saw the possibility of connecting two sloughs to create a millrace for industrial purposes in Eugene. Linked by a ditch approximately five blocks long, from Ferry St. to Kincaid St., the millrace was completed in 1851, followed closely by the addition of a sawmill on its banks in 1852, and a flour mill by 1856. During the third quarter of the nineteenth century, the industrial activity of the millrace contributed heavily to the growth of Eugene. The railroad came to Eugene in 1871, resulting in a building boom in housing and hotels, as well as new industries joining the banks of the lower millrace including furniture makers, a tannery, and a woolen mill. From 1877 to 1898, the millrace was at its height as the industrial heart of Eugene, primarily seen as a power source for the mills along its banks. In 1890, the millrace flooded, damaging the intake channel and changing the millrace course. It was soon rebuilt, though devastating floods would become common to the millrace in later years.

By the early 1900s, the banks of the millrace had become a fashionable place to live, and many stately homes were appearing along 11th Avenue with their backyards running down to the millrace. In 1910, controversy arose between the millrace owners and property owners, ensuing in a multi-year legal battle that would hamper development along the race. The millrace owners, in an effort to further increase the industrial power of the millrace, planned to extensively widen and deepen the millrace course. Property owners, however, objected, stating any such improvements would alter or destroy their lawns, claiming continued alterations and high water levels were flooding basements and overflowing their land. The case escalated and finally landed in the Supreme Court of Oregon, which though siding with the defendants, set definitive limits to Shaw's original easement in regard to further widening and development. During the time of this debate, industrial growth along the millrace slowed due to uncertainty about its future. Other technological advances were also occurring at the time, making water power practices nearly obsolete. In 1928, flooding again breached the intake channel and all waterwheels along the race were finally stopped. Eventually the industries converted to electricity as a more reliable energy source, ending the millrace's reign as the industrial power of the city.

The Eugene Mill & Elevator was constructed in 1895 by Williams & Matthews to replace a previous mill destroyed by fire in 1892. The site was historically located along a millrace developed in c1850 by Hilyard Shaw, and given additional impetus when the Oregon & California Railroad reached Eugene in 1871. In 1877-1898 the millrace became the industrial heart of Eugene. By 1912 a grainhouse replaced a small shed on the west elevation to connect the elevator and flour mill. The west lean-to roof was raised on the north end during the early 1920s to accommodate equipment for conversion to electrical power. The Bushman Brothers acquired the mill & elevator in 1931 and operated it until 1946 when all but the lone elevator burned down. The cupola was removed in the 1970s when the new roof and east shed of corrugated steel were constructed. The elevator was significant as the last remaining structure of the city's pioneer millrace industrial complex, which catapulted Eugene to commercial prominence and its designation as the county seat. After extensive review by the City of Eugene, the elevator was allowed to be demolished by the Eugene Water & Electric Board in November 1986.

== Recreation and university traditions ==
As the industrial needs of the millrace decreased, recreational use flourished. A cold winter in 1884 caused the millrace to freeze over, and students and townspeople went ice skating in its first recreational use. It wasn't long before the millrace's recreational opportunities caught on, and in 1890, Edward McClanahan opened a boathouse at Ferry Street, renting skiffs to University of Oregon students and community members. This was the start of the romantic era of the millrace, an idyllic setting for boating and picnics among the young student population of the university. As boating increased in popularity, and the mode of transportation evolved from flat-bottomed skiffs to canoes, additional boathouses opened in 1906 and 1911. The opening of the Anchorage followed in 1913, what would become a well-loved University hangout until being torn down in 1950.

As canoeing increased as a leisure activity among students, the canoe fete was established as part of the junior weekend festivities. In 1915, the first night parade featuring decorated canoes was held. The fete was a tremendous success from the start, and would only become more elaborate each year, with lavishly decorated floats soon making their way down the millrace. The event drew crowds of spectators and bleachers were constructed in 1922 to allow for more strategic viewing. In addition, lights were installed above the bleachers and millrace, and spotlights highlighted the floats as they passed, adding “… unusual charm and beauty to the fete.” The canoe fete at its height was featured in news reels and radio broadcasts, and was even endorsed by the likes of Bing Crosby, who in 1935 wrote a letter to the fete committee offering a prize to the builders of the winning float and extending his regards for the event. “Congratulations on the happy selection of the ‘Melody in Spring’ theme for Oregon's Water Pageant. It should be very beautiful,” he wrote, as printed in the Oregon Daily Emerald. “I am happy to extend my best wishes for the success of the event.” With this success, the university began making plans to enhance the event, purchasing property north of the millrace with intentions of developing an outdoor amphitheater, open park space, and even relocating the nearby railroad tracks. These plans came to a halt with the onset of World War II, however, and though the canoe fete would eventually continue, the romantic, carefree days of boating and canoe fetes would never reach the same height. In 1971, the canoe fete was discontinued “due to a lack of financial support, higher costs, and decreasing spectator interest.” With the focus on larger issues at hand, such as the Vietnam War, the canoe fete seemed extraneous with regard to the changing attitudes of the time.

Canoeing on the millrace wasn't all fond memories, however, as boating incidents were relatively common on the race. Senior class president Robert C. Bailey was the victim of one these tragic accidents, losing his life in a canoeing accident on Easter Sunday 1939. The eight Pyramidal English Oaks standing in the university's Memorial Quad were planted in 1940 in honor of Bailey. A brass plaque is also located on the fountain on the Knight Library terrace as part of the memorial. Another integral tradition at the time was the practice of millrace “dunking.” Dunking was a regular occasion on campus, the punishment for breaking rules, violating traditions, or as part of fraternity hazing. Not even women were safe from a millrace dunking, with a 1949 Eugene Daily Emerald article requesting tradition violators to meet for their punishment, with "women wearing appropriate dunking clothes.”

== Deterioration ==
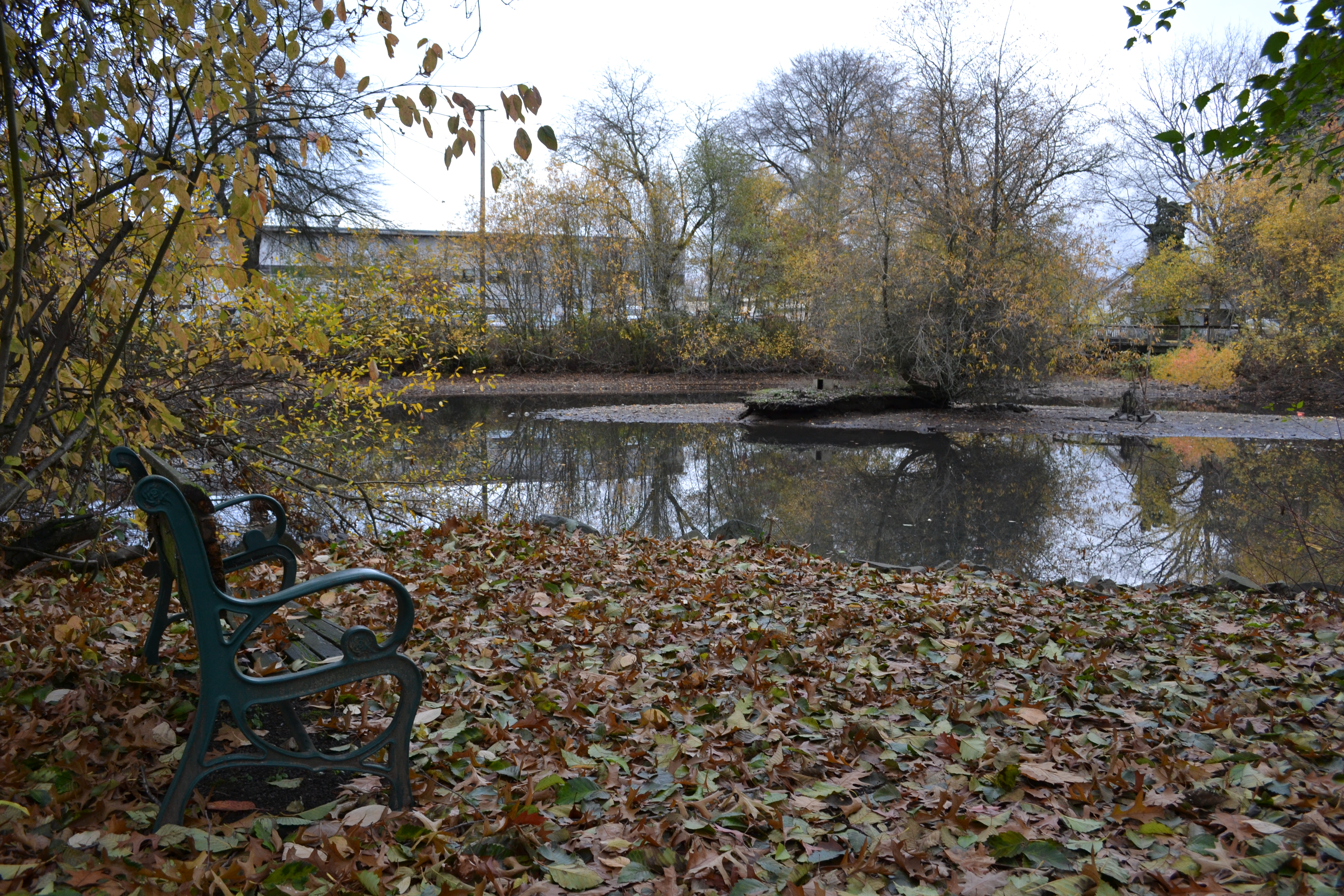
Mill Race 1

After another series of flooding resulted in damage to the intake channel, the millrace ran dry and the fete was switched to a float parade on wheels in 1945. In 1947, the City of Eugene purchased the millrace, and in 1949 installed a pipe along the length of the lower millrace channel to accommodate highway improvements. After the millrace was refilled, it was discovered that both the intake pipe and the pipe newly installed under the new highway were too small to accommodate adequate flow. While the millrace originally flowed at a rate of 250 cubic feet per second, the current flow was only at 25 cubic feet per second.

== Preservation efforts ==
In the following years, regular efforts were made by various university and neighborhood groups to revive the millrace. In 1955, a University of Oregon group led efforts to bring the millrace back to its former glory, funding engineering surveys and even bringing back a successful Canoe Fete to highlight the promise of a restored millrace. Continual disagreements over water flow, maintenance costs, and preservation approaches have gone on for years, however, hampering progress on any permanent revitalization efforts. In 1990, the millrace was the local focus of National Historic Preservation Week, with city, neighborhood, and university groups highlighting the millrace's historic significance within the city in attempts to spur preservation efforts. Though the future of the millrace remains in question, it was formally documented during the Oregon Department of Transportation's Willamette River Bridge replacement project.
