= Eugene Water & Electric Board =

Water and electric utility in Eugene, Oregon

- Company type: Public utility
- Industry: Electricity, Water
- Founded: 1911
- Headquarters: Eugene, Oregon, United States
- Number of employees: 500+
- Website: www.eweb.org

The Eugene Water & Electric Board (EWEB) is Oregon's largest customer-owned utility. Founded in 1911, it provides electricity and water to more than 86,000 customers in or around Eugene, Oregon.

Chartered by the City of Eugene, a five-member Board of Commissioners is elected by the citizens of Eugene and governs the utility. Four commissioners are elected by their respective geographic wards; a fifth commissioner is at-large and elected by all of Eugene's voters. This board retains full control and sets policies for the water and electric utilities.

== Electric resource portfolio ==
More than 95 percent of the electricity EWEB serves its customers comes from hydropower, wind and other sources that do not generate carbon-based emissions that are linked to global warming.

Most of this electricity comes from the federal Bonneville Power Administration and from EWEB's own hydroelectric projects. EWEB was the first public utility in Oregon to own a wind farm, and the utility has contracts to purchase a substantial amount of wind and geothermal power generated in the Northwest.

== Power projects ==
Hydro	Wind	Steam Co-generation
Carmen-Smith Hydroelectric Project	Foote Creek Rim Wind Project	EWEB/International Paper Steam Co-generation Plant
Smith Creek Hydroelectric Project	Harvest Wind	Wauna Steam Co-Generation Project
Leaburg-Walterville Hydroelectric Project		
Stone Creek Hydroelectric Project		

== Electric resource plan ==
EWEB’s Integrated Electric Resource Plan guides future resource decisions. Developed with the help of citizens, it prioritizes a continually aggressive energy conservation effort and the acquisition of renewable power to meet increased demand that such effort cannot offset.

== See also ==
- Hayden Bridge (Springfield, Oregon), near EWEB's water intake facilities
