= Nankin Mills Nature Center =

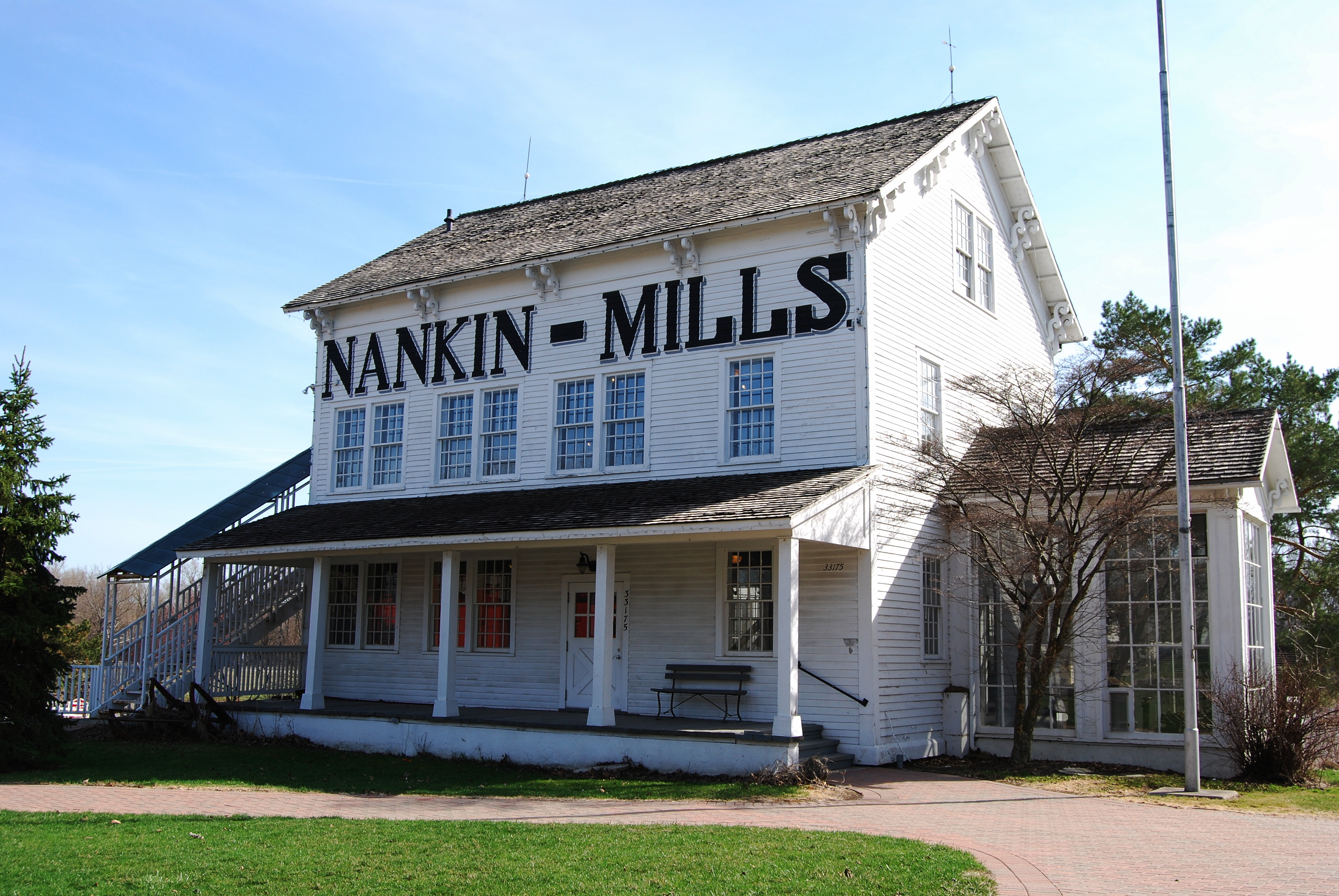

- Location within Michigan
- Interactive map
- 42°20′55″N 83°22′10″W
- Location: 33175 Ann Arbor Trail, Westland, Michigan

History
- Built: 1863

Site notes
- Governing body: State

Michigan State Historic Site
- Designated: March 11, 1967

The Nankin Mills Nature Center is a historic and nature interpretive center located at 33175 Ann Arbor Trail in Westland, Michigan. It was originally built as a grist mill, and was one of Henry Ford's "village industries." The mill was designated a Michigan State Historic Site in 1967. Today, Nankin Mills serves as the headquarters of Wayne County Parks, and sits at the center of Hines Park.

== Description ==
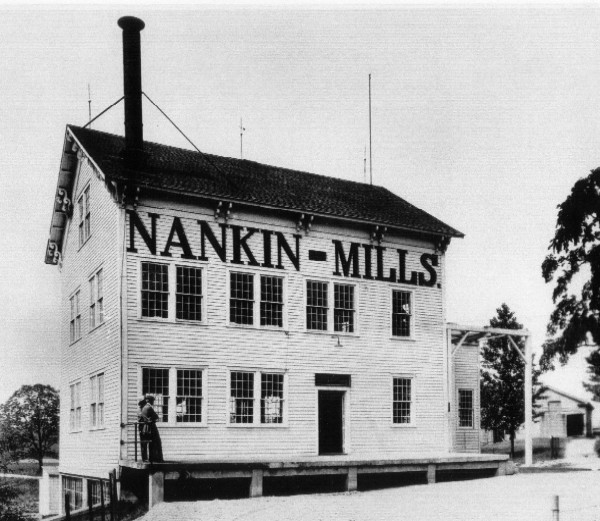
Nankin Mills, c. 1918, with Henry Ford and Floyd Bassett on the porch

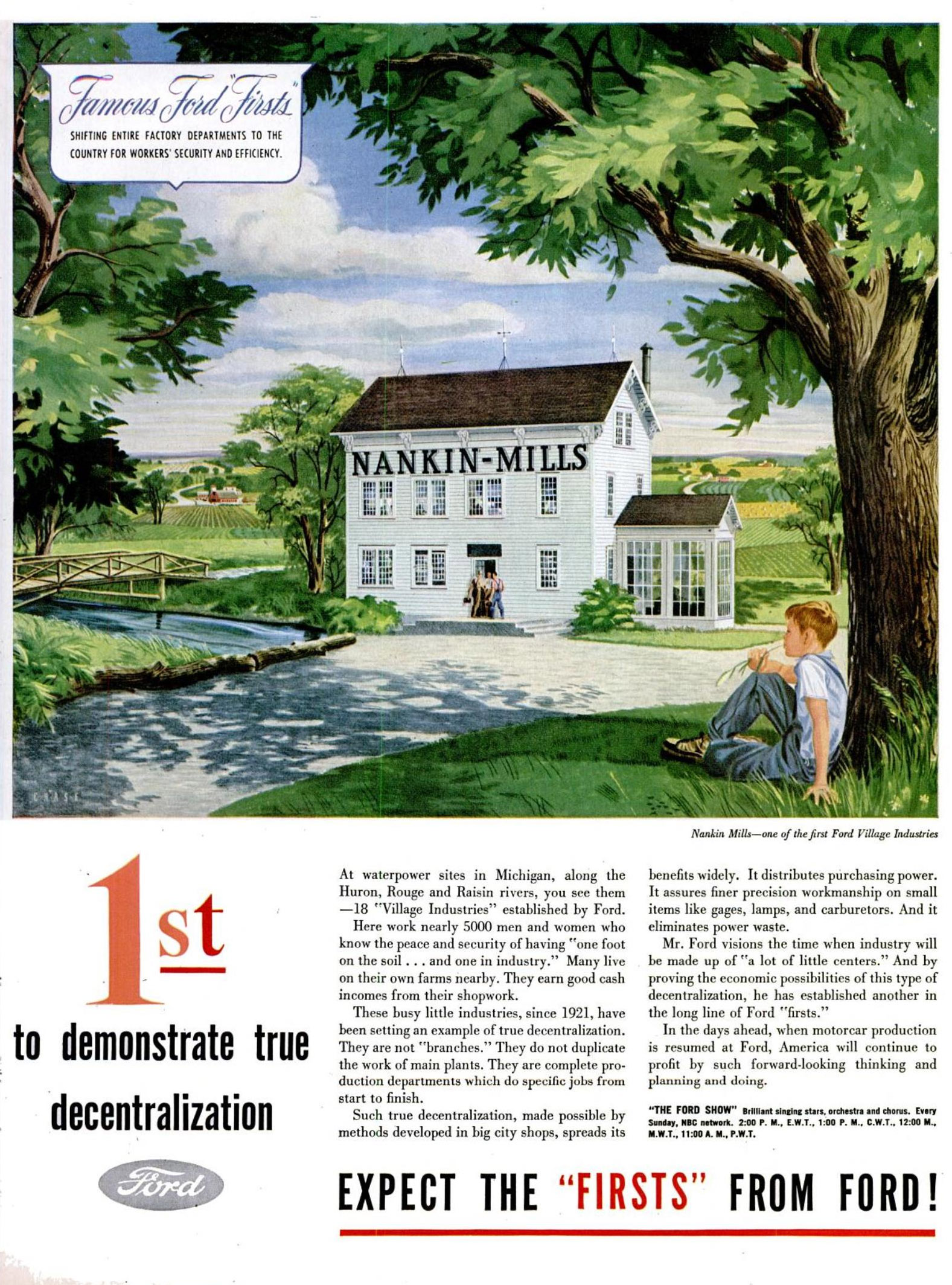
1945 village industries ad

The Nankin Mills Nature Center is a 2 1/2-story Greek Revival mill building. It is framed and sided with clapboard. A one-story porch runs the width of the building.

== History ==
Construction on the first mill on this site was begun in 1835. However, the construction was abandoned until 1842, when a new owner completed the building and installed an overshot water wheel. A small community, known as Pike's Peak, grew up around the mill. In addition to the mill, Pike's Peak boasted a blacksmith's shop, printing shop, general store, and post office.

The original mill burned some time during the Civil War. The present mill was constructed in 1863 by Samuel Hardenbergh. In 1887, Hardenbergh sold the mill to Isaac Martin Lewis, who replaced the overshot water wheel with a more efficient turbine.

In 1918, Henry Ford purchased the mill as part of his Village industries program. Ford developed his Village Industries in part to provide farm workers a stable source of income during the winter months. He converted the building into a small factory, and in 1920, twelve workers began producing screws for Ford. It was the second Village Industry to open, after the Ford Valve Plant in Northville. In 1927, Ford converted the site to make engravings and stencils; eventually it employed 70 people.

However, the Village Industries experiment proved unprofitable, and after World War II the factory closed. In 1948, Ford donated the site to the Wayne County Road Commission. The commission remodeled the mill, and in 1956 it was opened as a nature center. In the mid-1980s, Nankin Mills became the headquarters of the Wayne County Park System. An addition was built in 1999, and in 2001 the original mill reopened as an interpretive center.
