= Hines Park =

Hines Park may refer to:

- Edward N. Hines Park, Wayne County, Michigan
- Gerald D. Hines Waterwall Park, Houston, Texas
- Hines-Park Foods, a food manufacturing company founded by Roy H. Park
  - Duncan Hines, namesake of Hines-Park Foods
