= Edward Hines =

Edward Hines may refer to:

- Edward Hines (1863–1931), American businessman and lumberman, founder of Edward Hines Lumber Company
- Edward N. Hines (1870–1938), American innovator in road development
