= Saturday in the Park (disambiguation) =

"Saturday in the Park" is a 1972 single by Chicago.

Saturday in the Park may also refer to:

- Saturday in the Park (music festival), a music festival in Sioux City, Iowa
- Saturday in the Park (cycling event), a cycling event in Wayne County, Michigan
