= Phoenix Mill =

Coordinates: 42°23′33″N 83°28′1″W

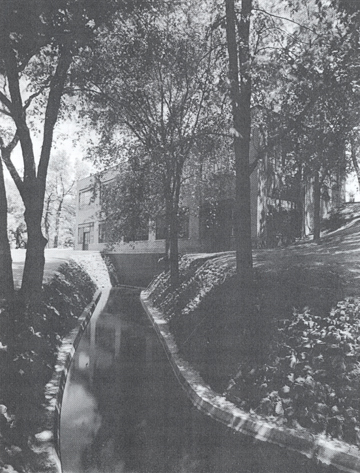
Phoenix Mill

Phoenix Mill was part of Henry Ford's Village industries project and ran from 1922 to 1948 in Plymouth, Michigan. Generator cutouts, voltage regulators, gauges and light switches for Ford vehicles were produced at the plant.

After the original gristmill burned down, Ford bought the site and utilized his Dearborn Realty and Construction Company to design and construct a new mill in 1921. Ford intended the factory to run entirely on a hydroelectric generator.

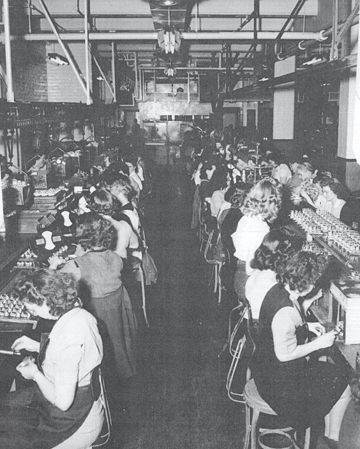
The Phoenix Mill factory line in the early 1940s

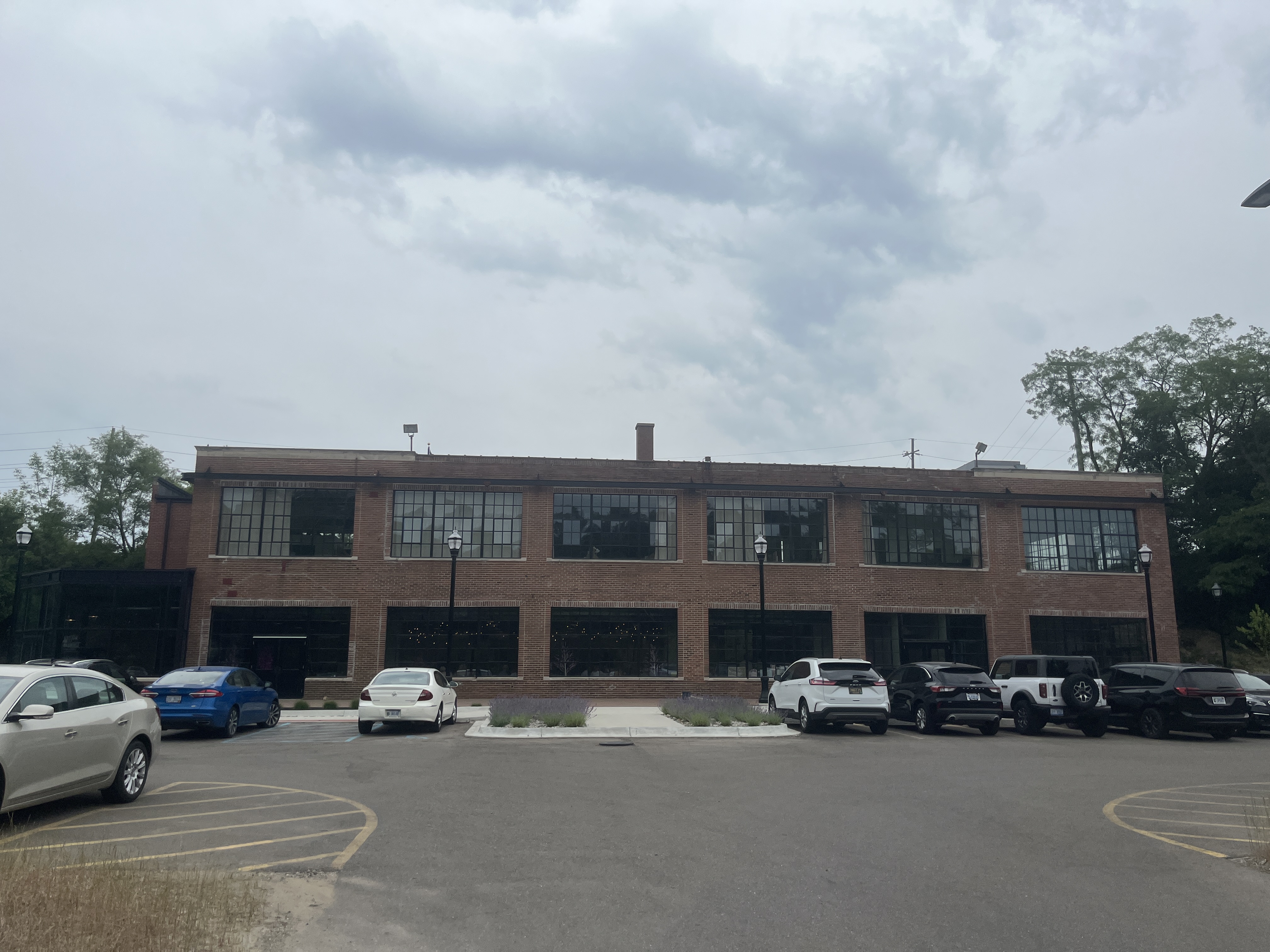
Phoenix Mill Events in June 2023

== Employees ==
Workers at Phoenix Mill were mostly women, with male maintenance workers and a male manager. Before the union, women who were hired had to be single, widowed, or married with a husband who was not able to work. Workers had limited breaks and were under pressure to keep optimum efficiency, but were paid the same or more than men who had similar jobs.

== Status ==
Ownership of the mill eventually passed to Wayne County, as part of Hines Park. The building was used only for storage for decades. In 2018, it was sold by Wayne County to a developer, who began converting it into an event space. The pandemic altered the timeline and plans, but the banquet center opened in 2022. The second floor was converted into offices.
