= Village industries =

Former rural factories in Michigan, United States

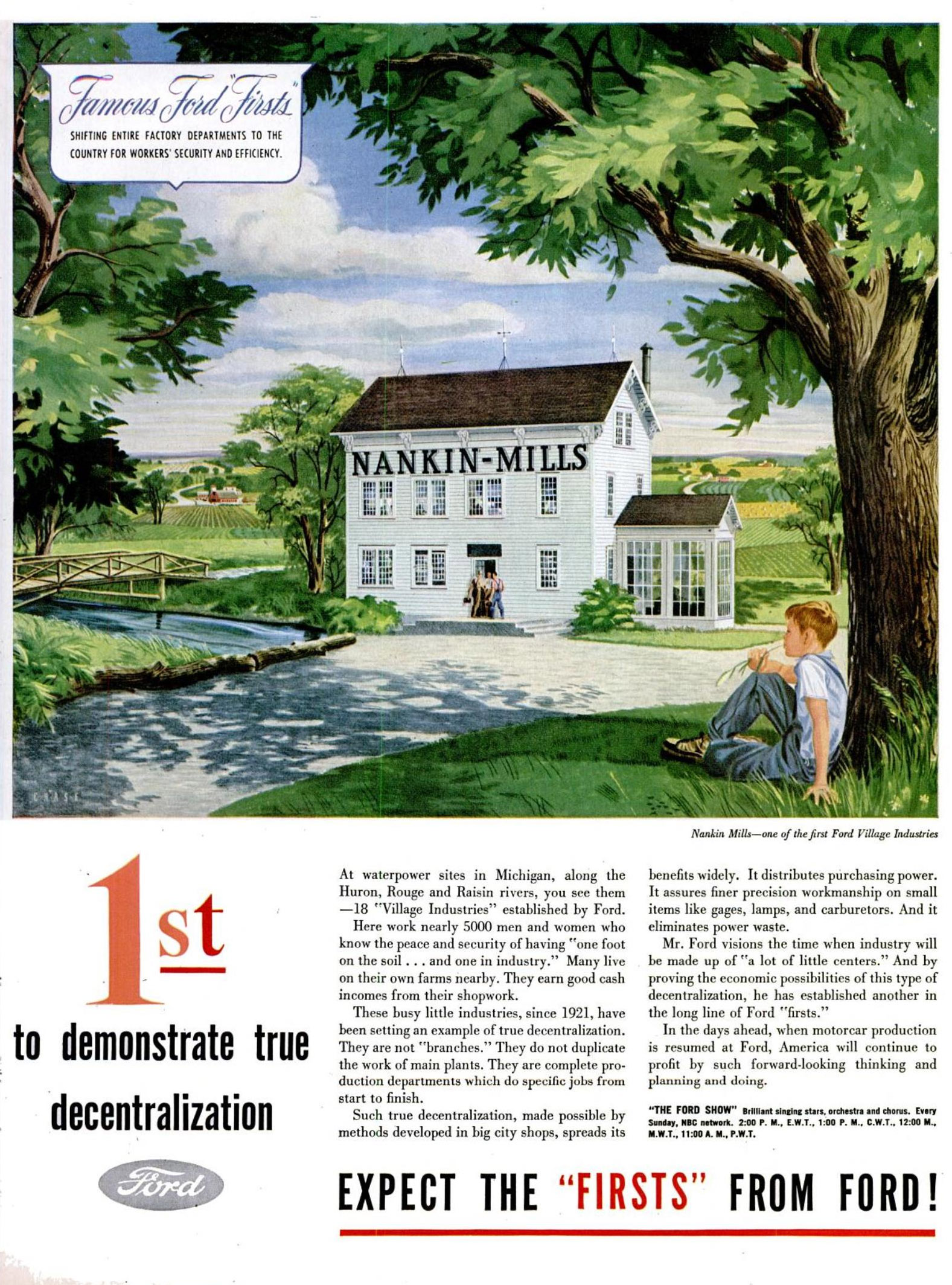
1945 village industries ad

Henry Ford's Village Industries were small factories located in rural areas of Michigan. Ford developed his Village Industries in part to provide farm workers a stable source of income during the winter months.

== Philosophy ==
Ford strongly felt that there were many positive aspects to rural life. At the same time, he recognized that the promise of high wages was encouraging young people to discard the agrarian life of their parents and move to the cities. The spreading of industrialization (due in part, Ford knew, to his very own factory system) was making farming less attractive and giving farmers less to do in the winter. Ford developed the village industries program as a way to bring manufacturing jobs to the countryside, allowing residents to reap the economic advantages without giving up their agricultural heritage. His village industries were intended to strengthen rural communities by providing jobs to unemployed and under-employed local residents, allowing farmers to work in the winter and return to farming in the summer. It was also, in a very real sense, intended to maintain the bucolic settings and lifestyles that Ford remembered from his boyhood and idealized to some extent.

Ford wanted to create places where technology, manufacturing, and agriculture could co-exist. He established his village industries in rural areas where farmland was easily available. However, Ford intended the village industries to be an integral part of his manufacturing system, providing cost-effective and reliable parts. To minimize the increased costs of transportation incurred by these decentralized manufacturing plants, Ford chose sites that were primarily near larger existing Ford plants (the Ford River Rouge Complex and the Highland Park Ford Plant). The products the village industries made were all small and light, able to be efficiently shipped.

Ford also believed in using clean and readily-available sources of power. Water power, he thought, was nearly inexhaustible and easy to come by in Michigan. He had in fact begun experimenting with water power when building his house at Fair Lane. Thus, the village industry plants all made use of hydroelectric power; indeed, many were located at the site of old mills. Some of the village industry plants actually utilize refurbished grist mill buildings, others merely used the site, with Ford erecting new industrial buildings to house the plant.

== History ==
After World War I, Henry Ford began a program of decentralizing his manufacturing efforts away from Detroit and Dearborn, Michigan, establishing plants in other areas of Michigan and across the country. Ford felt that decentralization held many advantages, in particular that managing the comings and goings of a large number of employees at any one site became problematic. One part of this plan was the establishment of small rural manufacturing plants known as "village industries." The village industries reflected Ford's vision of decentralization: not merely locating factories in different cities or regions of the country, but taking specific production tasks out of the larger factories and moving them to small rural factories.

In 1918, Ford made his first purchase of a village industry site when he bought Nankin Mills (now part of Westland, Michigan) on the Rouge River. Nankin Mills was in fact familiar to Ford: as a boy he had travelled with his father to the site to grind grain. In 1919, Ford made his second purchase on the Rouge: an old gristmill in Northville, Michigan. The site was again familiar to Ford: he had spent his honeymoon in Northville. Ford planned on building more sites, and so forged an agreement with the Wayne County Road Commission, where the commission would build hydro dams along the Rouge for Ford's use, in return for receiving the land (and eventually the mills) that Ford had purchased. Ford eventually built six of his village industries at mill sites along the Rouge River.

Ford reconfigured the Northville property into a valve manufacturing facility by moving machinery in from the Fordson and Highland Park plants. The Northville Ford Valve Plant was the first village industry to open, in 1919–20. Meanwhile, Ford converted Nankin Mills into a small factory, and in 1920, workers began producing screws.

More plants were quickly opened, with three more village industries in Phoenix, Plymouth, and Waterford by 1925. After that, there was something of a lull in the village industry program, with only two new plants, in Flat Rock and Ypsilanti, opened in the next ten years. However, in the late 1930s and early 1940s, Ford moved to rapidly expand the village industry concept, opening plants in Tecumseh, Newburg, Dundee, Brooklyn, Saline, Milan, Milford, Sharon Hollow, Willow Run, and Manchester. many of these plants, opening in the middle of the Great Depression, had a profound economic effect on the community, employing dozens or hundreds of workers who would otherwise have been unemployed or have moved away. During World War II, three more plants, at Hayden Mills, Cherry Hill, and Clarkston, were constructed.

However, the village industry program did not live much longer than Henry Ford himself. The small manufacturing plants were not a financial success, and the stricter accountability procedures implemented after Henry Ford relinquished the presidency in 1945 found that they did not return optimal cost/benefit ratios. Ford Motor Company soon began closing the Village Industries; most of the plants were closed in the 1940s. Only five were still operating in the mid-1950s, three in the mid-1960s, and only a single one, the Ford Valve Plant in Northville, in the mid-1970s. The Northville plant, ironically both the first and last of Ford's village industries, continued in operation until 1981.

== List of sites ==
There was never a canonical list of sites included in the village industries program, and it is not always clear from the scale, siting, or establishment date of a particular factory whether the site should be considered a "village industry" or simply a small factory. Ford Motor Company itself says that "more than 30 Village Industries plants sprouted throughout Michigan, Ohio, Mississippi, New York and other states." However, contemporaneous accounts describe village industries as being confined to "different points within a 50 mile radius of Dearborn."

Thus, many contemporary historians limit consideration to the 18 or 20 sites in southern Michigan that Ford established primarily in the 1920s and 1930s. The following list of sites comes from Howard P. Segal, author of the book Recasting the machine age: Henry Ford's village industries, who lists 19 separate sites. Other historians use a substantially similar list; for example, Mullin includes the same 19 sites, but deprecates Nankin Mills, which he describes as "not actually part of the Village Industries," but "set[ting] the tone for the decentralized village factories that followed.

=== Northville site ===
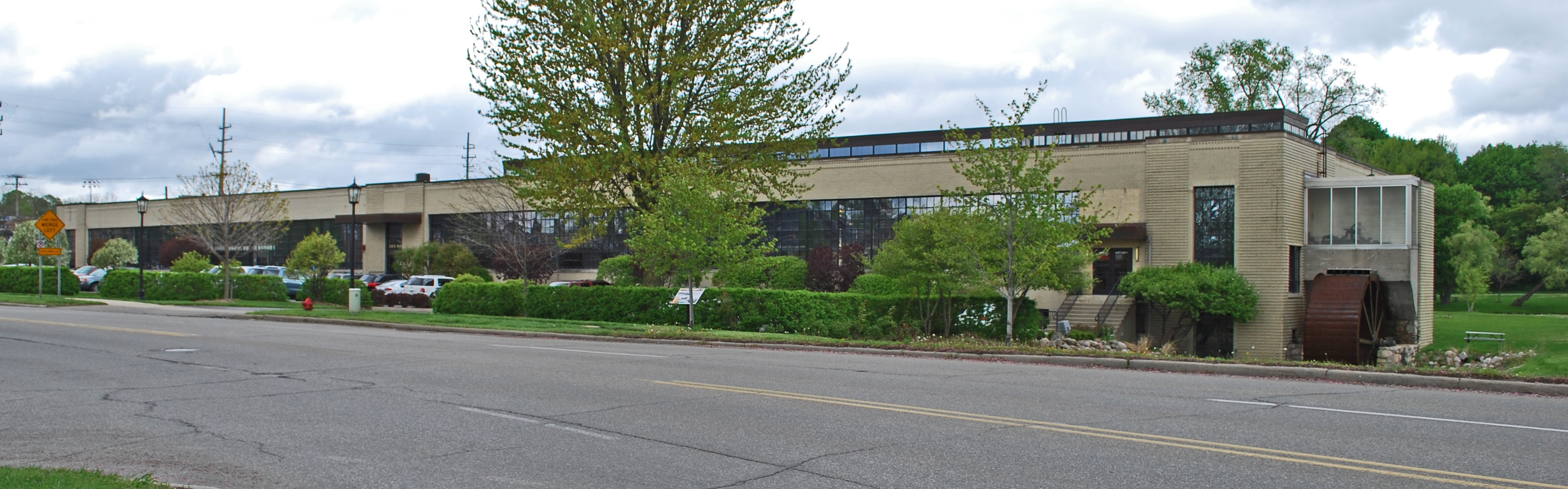

42°25′56″N 83°28′40″W
The Northville plant is located at 235 East Main Street in Northville, Michigan. The site was originally a gristmill built in 1825 and renovated in 1896. A second gristmill was built on this site by the Yerkes family, and later a sawmill was built by the Dubar family.

Henry Ford purchased the old gristmill located at this site in 1919. He reconfigured the mill into a valve manufacturing facility by moving machinery in from the Fordson and Highland Park plants, and opened it as the first of the village industries in 1920. Between 1920 and 1936, the plant manufactured over 180 million valves, at a cost of less than half what it would be in the larger Highland Park plant.

In 1936, Ford replaced the mill with an Albert Kahn-designed factory building. The building reflects the then-current industrial architecture, as well as hints of Art Deco in the brickwork and entryway styling but still incorporated a water wheel. With the new building, as many as 400 people were employed at the Northville plant. The factory continued to produce valves after the Village Industries program was discontinued in 1947. The building was enlarged in 1956, and in 1969 over 150,000 valves were produced every day. The plant continued operations until 1981, the longest lived of any former Village Industries factory. It reopened in 1982 to manufacture shipping racks and gas tanks, but operations were discontinued for good in 1989.

The building was later sold. The building has been renovated into office space for use by design firms. The land surrounding the building is a town park, in part containing "Mill Race Village," an outdoor museum of restored buildings. The valve plant was listed on the National Register of Historic Places in 1995.

=== Nankin Mills site ===
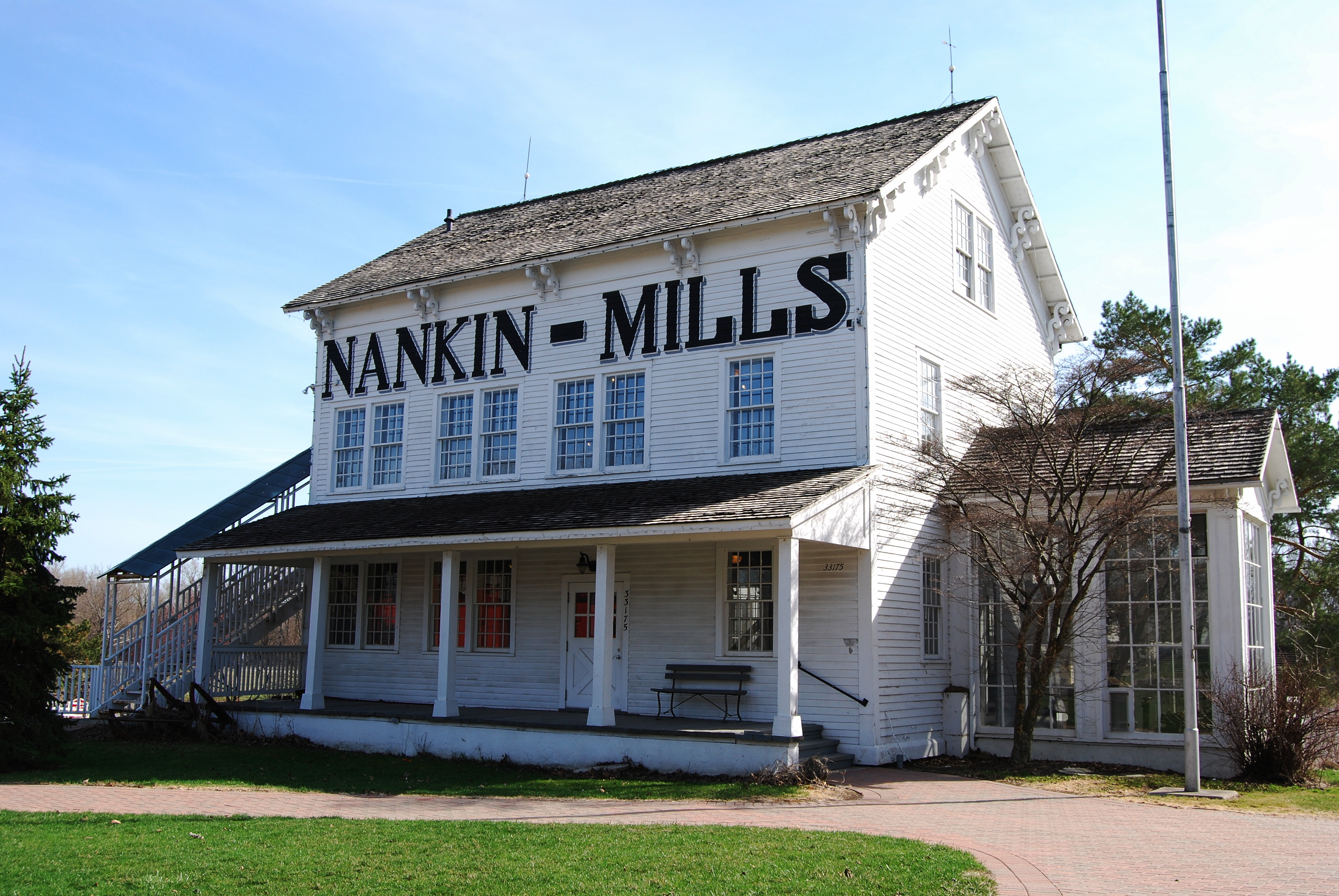

42°20′55″N 83°22′10″W
The Nankin Mills site is located at 33175 Ann Arbor Trail in Westland, Michigan. The first mill on this site was constructed in 1835–42; that mill burned some time during the Civil War. The second mill was constructed in 1863 by Samuel Hardenbergh. In 1887, Hardenbergh sold the mill to Martin Lewis, and at a later date was purchased by Floyd Bassett.

The mill was eventually purchased by Henry Ford in 1918 from Bassett. Ford converted the building into a small factory, and in 1920, twelve workers began producing screws for Ford. It was the second Village Industry to open, after the Ford Valve Plant in Northville. In 1927, Ford converted the site to make engravings and stencils, and in 1937 a new building was constructed at the site. Eventually it employed 70 people.

The plant closed in 1948, after which Ford donated the site to the Wayne County Road Commission. The commission remodeled the mill, and in 1956 it was opened as a nature center. It was designated a Michigan State Historic Site in 1967; in the mid-1980s, Nankin Mills became the headquarters of the Wayne County Park System. An addition was built in 1999, and in 2001 the original mill reopened as an interpretive center.

The mill was designated a state of Michigan historic site in 1967, and a historical marker is placed at this site.

=== Phoenix Mill site ===
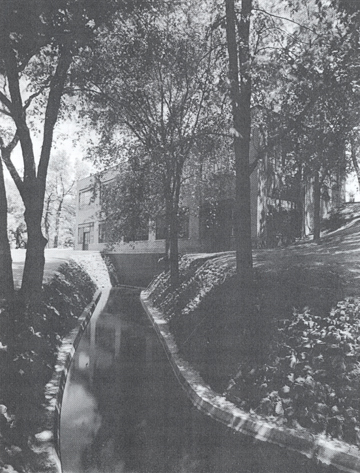

42°23′33″N 83°28′1″W
The Phoenix Mill is located on the Rouge River, at 14973 Northville Road (at Edward N. Hines Drive) in Plymouth Township. It is the site of the former village of Phoenix. Phoenix was founded in 1837, and flourished only until about 1880. The mill located at this site was built in 1840 and burned in 1905.

Ford purchased the site of the mill in 1919, and according to the blue prints, utilized his Dearborn Realty and Construction Company to design and build the mill. It is a commonly held myth that Albert Kahn designed Phoenix Mill. A list of projects conducted by the Albert Kahn firm for Henry Ford that is held at the Benson Ford Research Center reveals that the only work the Kahn Firm conducted at Phoenix Mill was a sewer study. The plant was built, but the opening was delayed when the mill dam collapsed in 1921 and had to be reconstructed. The plant opened in 1922, employing exclusively women workers from Ford's Highland Park plant. The Phoenix plant was notable in that Ford paid the women workers high wages, equal to those of male workers, a rarity in the 1920s. The workers, however, were required to be single and childless, and to be properly attired in dresses, stockings and heels.

At its peak 148 women were employed at the Phoenix Mill. The site originally produced generator cutouts; in 1940 the line was changed to produce voltage regulators for V8 engines. During World War II, the plant made parts for B-24 bombers. The Phoenix Mill plant closed in 1948, and Ford turned it over to the Wayne County Road Commission, who used it as a maintenance yard. The mill was designated a state of Michigan historic site in 1989. A Michigan Women's Museum was later planned for the site, but had not materialized.

=== Flat Rock site ===
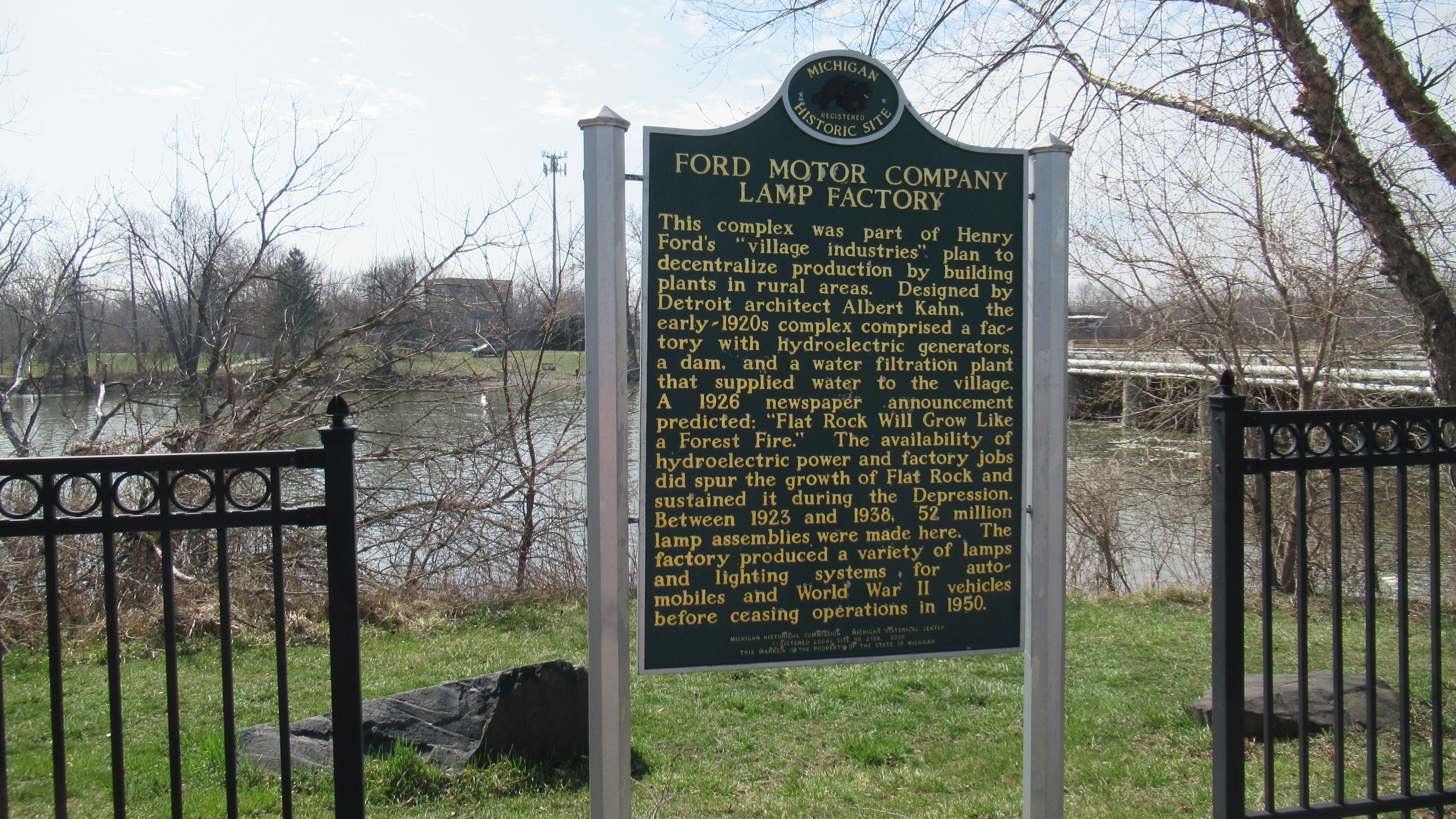

42°5′55″N 83°17′55″W
The Flat Rock plant was built on the site of a former sawmill in Flat Rock, Michigan. Ford purchased the property in 1921 and hired Albert Kahn to design a building for the site. The plant which opened in 1923. It employed as many as 1200 people, and made all of the vehicle lamps used by Ford.

The Flat Rock site closed in 1950, and the production was moved to the nearby facility in Monroe, Michigan. The site is now occupied by smaller private manufacturing companies; the surrounding land has been renovated into a park. A state of Michigan historical marker is now placed at the site.

=== Plymouth site ===
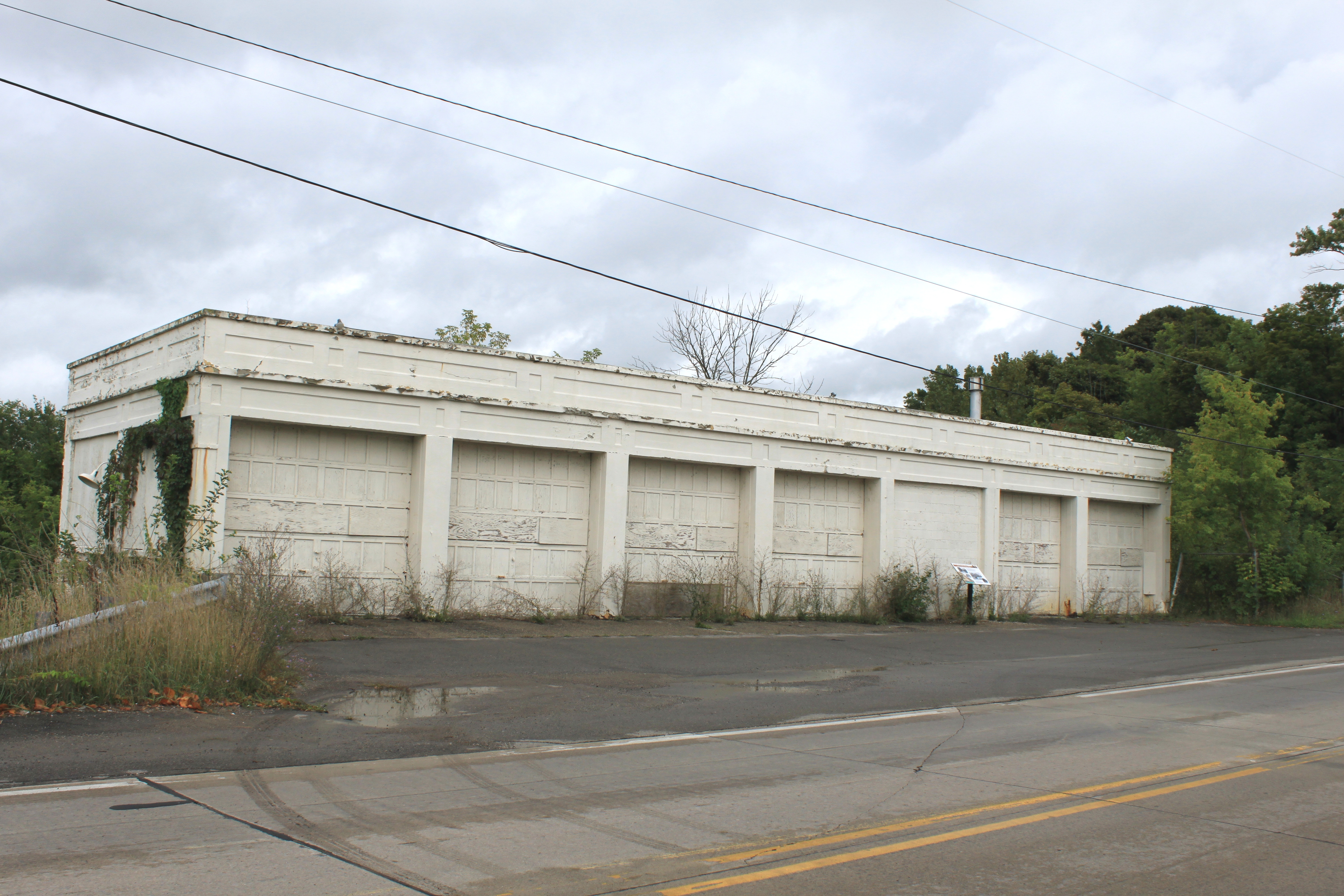

42°23′1″N 83°27′30″W
The Plymouth Mills site is located at 230 Wilcox in Plymouth, Michigan. A flour mill was built on this site in 1845 by Henry Holbrook. By 1860, "S. Hardenburgh" was listed as the owner, and in 1879 it became Wilcox Mills. Wilcox Mills was in continuous operation as a gristmill until Henry Ford purchased it and tore it down.

It is a commonly held myth that Albert Kahn designed this building for Ford. But research into Phoenix Mill for a State of Michigan Historic Marker reveals that neither of these mills was designed by Albert Kahn. This was confirmed via email by Kimberly N. Montague, current President & CEO of Albert Kahn Associates, Inc. on August 14, 2025. Plymouth Mill opened in 1923. The plant employed up to 23 people making taps and other tools used in manufacturing. The Plymouth site closed in 1948. The building was turned over to the Wayne County division of Parks, who used it as a garage. The site was designated a state of Michigan historic site in 1989. As of 2005, it is an artist's studio.

=== Waterford site ===
42°24′21″N 83°28′5″W
The Waterford plant is located at 16580 Northville Road (at Mill Road), just south of Six-Mile Road in Northville, Michigan. The area was originally the village of Mead's Mill (named for a second mill whose ruins can be seen to the south at 16000 Hines Drive). In 1873, the village was renamed "Waterford" (not to be confused with the Waterford in nearby Oakland County). A gristmill was built at this site.

In 1925, Ford bought the gristmill site and dam. A new building was designed for the site, which opened in 1925. The plant employed up to 210 people making precision gauges; the workers had been transferred from New Jersey when Ford purchased another company originally located there. The Waterford site closed in 1954. As of 2005, the building is owned by a window manufacturer.

=== Ypsilanti site ===
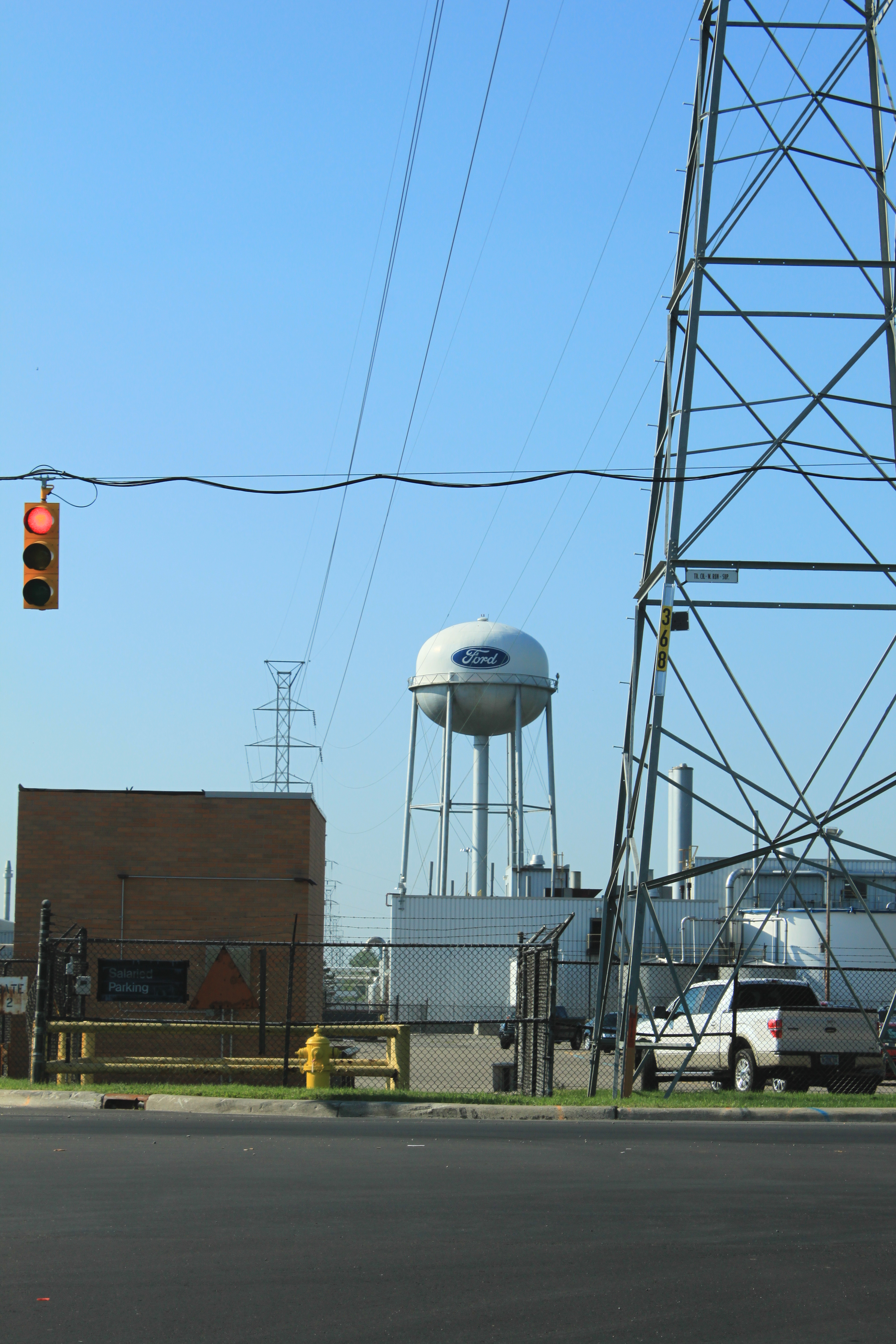

42°12′7″N 83°33′27″W
The Ypsilanti plant was housed in an Albert Kahn-designed located on the Huron River in Ypsilanti, Michigan. A hydroelectric plant was built three miles east of Ypsilanti in Rawsonville. The Ypsilanti plant opened in 1932, then merged with a larger Ford facility in 1947. After the merger, the plant employed 1500 people, making it the largest of all the village industries. The plant made all the starters and generators for the Ford Motor Company. It was eventually absorbed into a more conventional plant, and in 1969 the Rawsonville hydroelectric plant, dam, and the surrounding land was donated to the city of Ypsilanti.

=== Newburgh site ===
42°22′0″N 83°24′40″W
The Newburgh mill is located at 37401 Edward N. Hines Drive in Livonia, Michigan. In 1870, Nicholas Bovee dammed the river at this spot and built a cider mill. He dubbed the resulting body of water "Newburgh Lake," and the village of Newburgh sprung up around it.

In 1934, Ford bought the site of the Bovee cider mill. A new building was designed for the site, and was constructed through a partnership among Ford, the Wayne County Road Commission, and the New Deal Works Progress Administration program. The new plant opened in 1935. The plant employed up to 32 people making twist drills, and, during World War II, aircraft parts.

The Newburgh site closed in 1948. The building was turned over to the Wayne County division of Parks, who used it for maintenance and law enforcement. The site was designated a state of Michigan historic site in 1989. As of 2005, the building has been renovated for public use.

=== Hayden Mills site ===
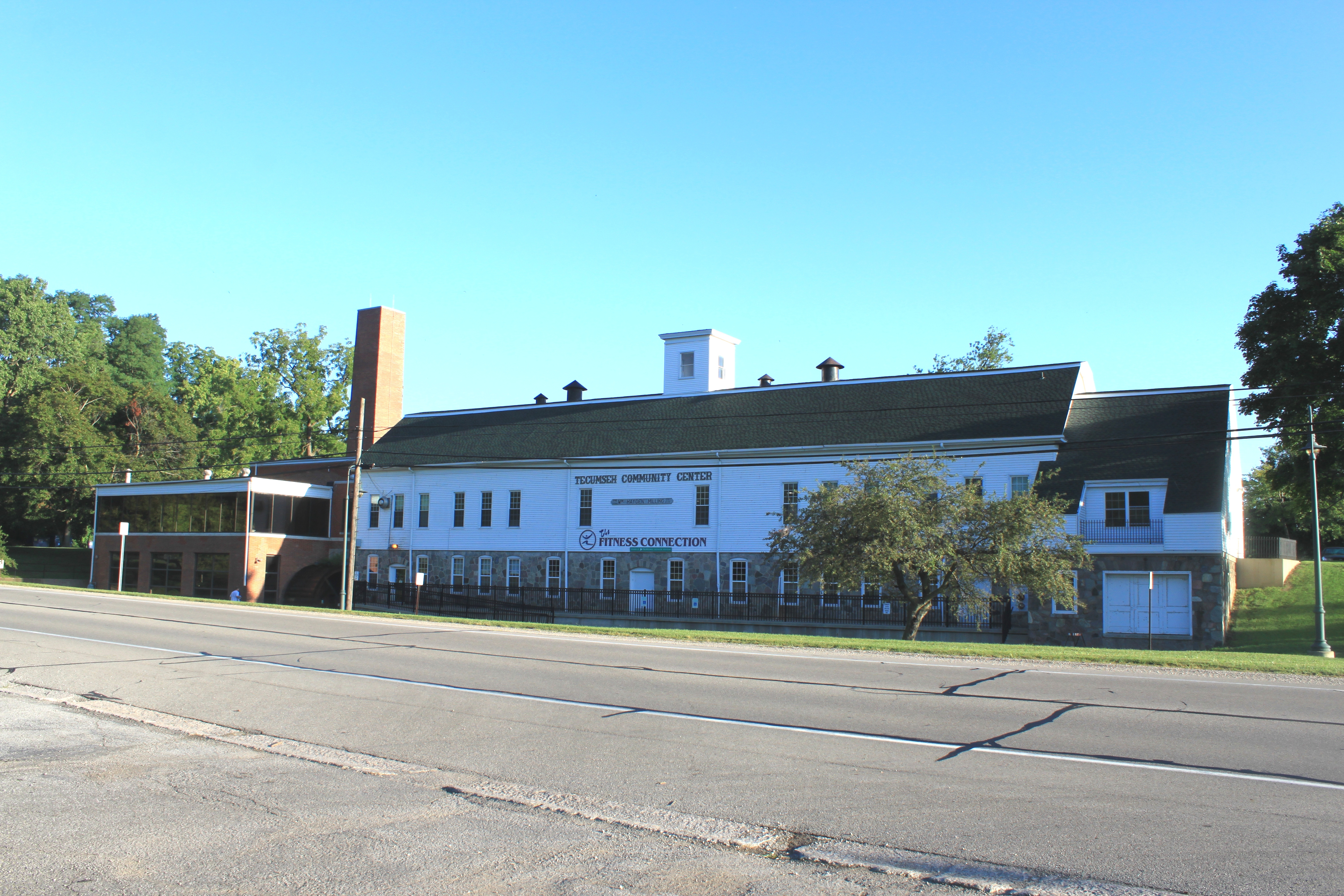

42°0′14″N 83°56′2″W
The Hayden Mills site is located at 703 East Chicago Street in Tecumseh, Michigan, at the Globe Mill Pond. This was originally the site of the Globe Mill, constructed in the 1830s by Stillman Blanchard as a flour mill at the cost of over $30,000. Blanchard went bankrupt in 1858, and sold the mill to William Hayden, who changed the name to Hayden Mills. In 1898, the original mill burned, and a new mill replaced it. An electric power plant was later added.

Eventually, Hayden's heirs sold the mill to Henry Ford. Ford rebuilt the mill and opened the plant in 1935. It employed up to 25 people in soybean processing. The site was closed in 1948. The site was used for some time as a private gun club. In 1961, it was donated to the city of Tecumseh, who used it as a Community Center. As of 2011, the building is planned for reuse.

=== Dundee site ===
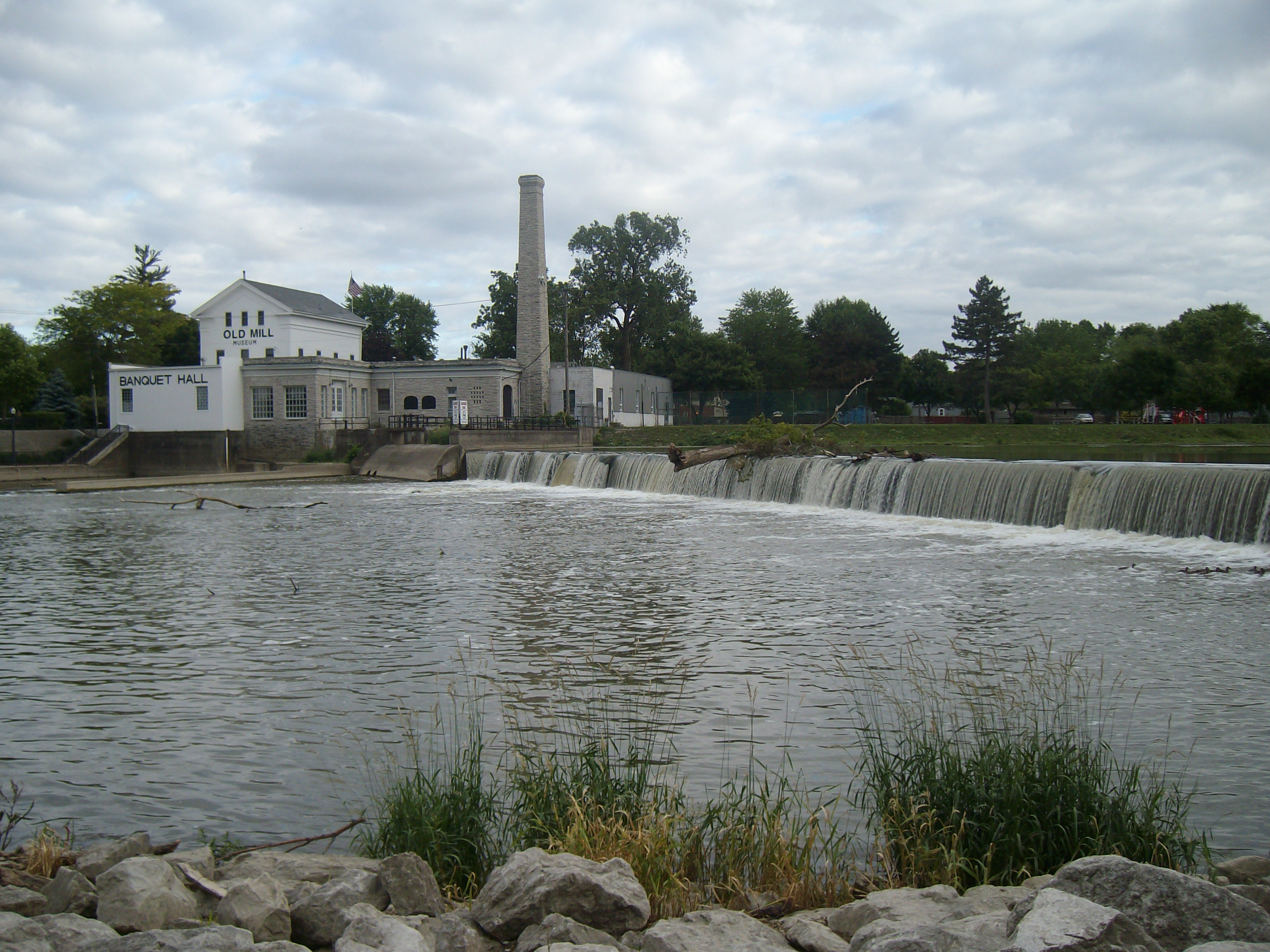

41°57′20″N 83°39′33″W
The Dundee mill, also known as the Alfred Wilkerson Grist Mill, is located at 242 Toledo Street in Dundee, Michigan. A sawmill, constructed in 1828, originally stood on this site. In 1846, Alfred Wilkerson built the nearby log dam, and in 1848-49 he replaced the earlier sawmill with the current structure, a gristmill. In 1880, Wilkersons sold the mill to Henry Smith, who sold it in 1882 to Captain R.B. Davis. Davis continued to use the site as a flour and feed mill, but in 1910 sold it to the Dundee Hydraulic Power Company. The Dundee Power Company built a small hydroelectric plant at the site in 1912, but in the 1920s, Detroit Edison began supplying power to the village, and the millsite was abandoned.

In 1931, the village decided to demolish the building, but Henry Ford, who had contemplated purchasing the site since 1922, bought it instead. In 1935, Ford began refurbishing the mill, and constructed some additional new buildings. The plant opened in 1936 as a copper-alloy foundry, making primarily copper welding tips. The site and employed up to 125 people.

The Dundee site closed in 1954, and was purchased by the Wolverine Fabricating and Manufacturing. They used it until 1970, sold the mill to the village of Dundee for $1.00. The site was unused for a decade until 1981, when restoration began. The village renovated the mill into offices, a community center, and a museum, which opened in 1986. The site was designated a state of Michigan historic site in 1979, and was placed on the National Register of Historic Places as part of the Dundee Historic District in 1990.

=== Milan site ===
42°4′52″N 83°41′3″W
The Milan site is located at 147 Wabash Street in Milan, Michigan. Ford purchased an existing mill in Milan in 1936. The mill was renovated, including the construction of a new dam and hydroelectric plant. The mill was used to process soybeans, and a small factory located on site was used to manufacture ignition coils. By 1939, the mill had nearly 200 employees and produced all the ignition coils used by the Ford Motor Company. The plant continued to make ignition coils through World War II, but was closed in 1948, with the production line and its employees moved to the nearby Ypsilanti plant. The property was turned over to the village of Milan, who used it for offices, the police department, and a library.

=== Milford site ===
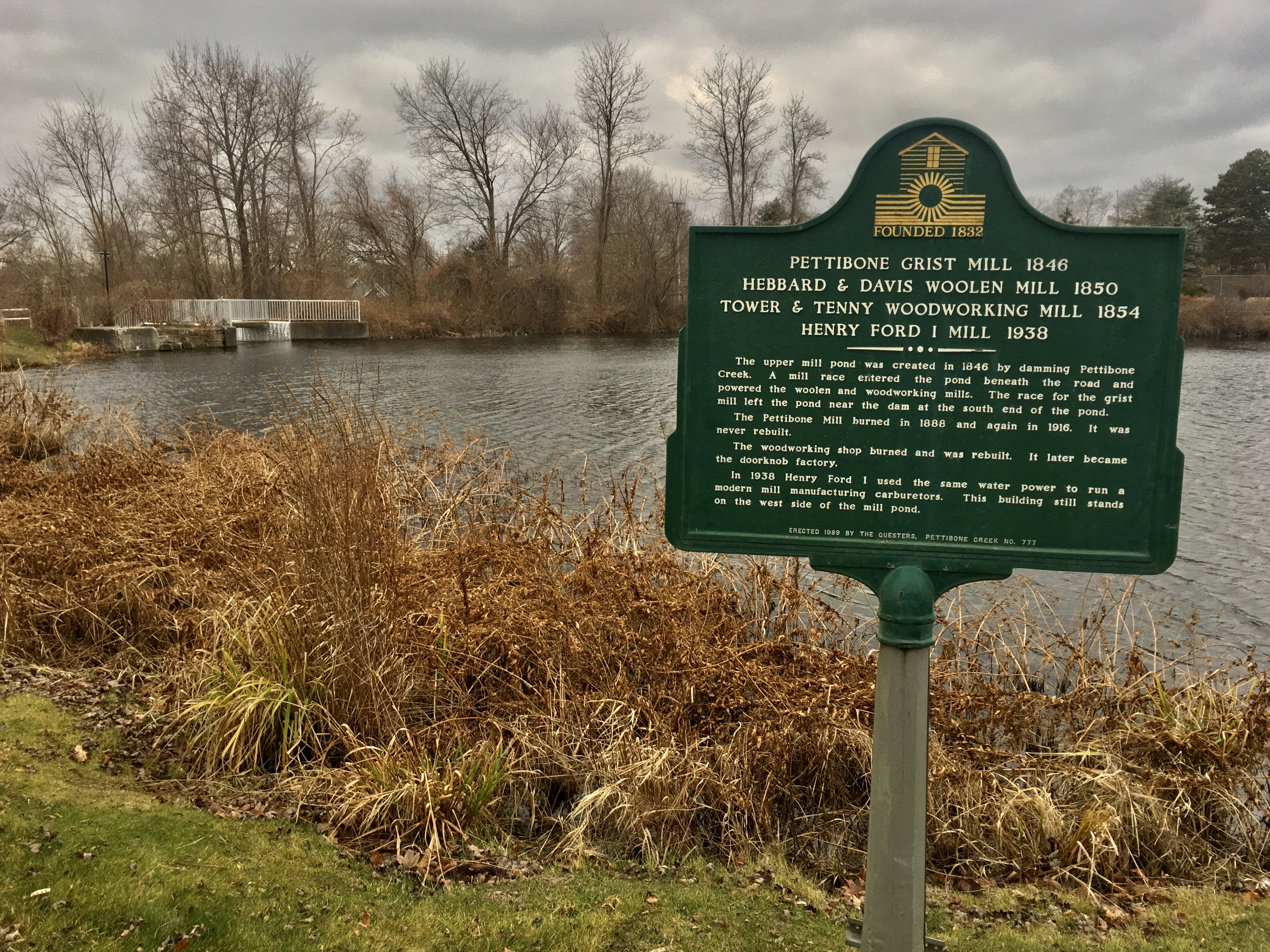

42°35′23″N 83°36′8″W
The remaining structure from the Milford site is located near a mill pond at 225 West Liberty in Milford, Michigan. The Upper Mill Pond in Milford was created by an 1845 dam. Early in the 20th century, Detroit Auto Dash built a factory nearby.

Ford purchased the Auto Dash factory and nearby property and in 1938 opened a plant, officially known as the "Pettibone Creek Hydroelectric Station," on the Upper Mill Pond. The plant consisted of two hydroelectric powerhouses (the Huron River and Pettibone Creek stations) and a manufacturing facility. The facility was designed by Albert Kahn. The Milford site was used to produce carburetors. The initial capacity of the facility was 2,450 carburetors per day; a renovation in 1945 increased the capacity to 3,200 carburetors per day.

The Milford facility remained in operation until 1957, when the production was transferred to a plant in Rawsonville. The old Auto Dash factory was sold to Kelsey-Hayes, who used it until the 1980s. The Huron River Hydroelectric Station was demolished in 1997 and the carburetor factory soon followed in 2001. The last remaining structure, the Pettibone Creek Hydroelectric Station (colloquially known as the "Milford Powerhouse"), has undergone extensive external restoration (completed in 2006) and interior restoration is in process. It was placed on the National Register of Historic Places as part of the North Milford Village Historic District in 2000.

=== Saline site ===
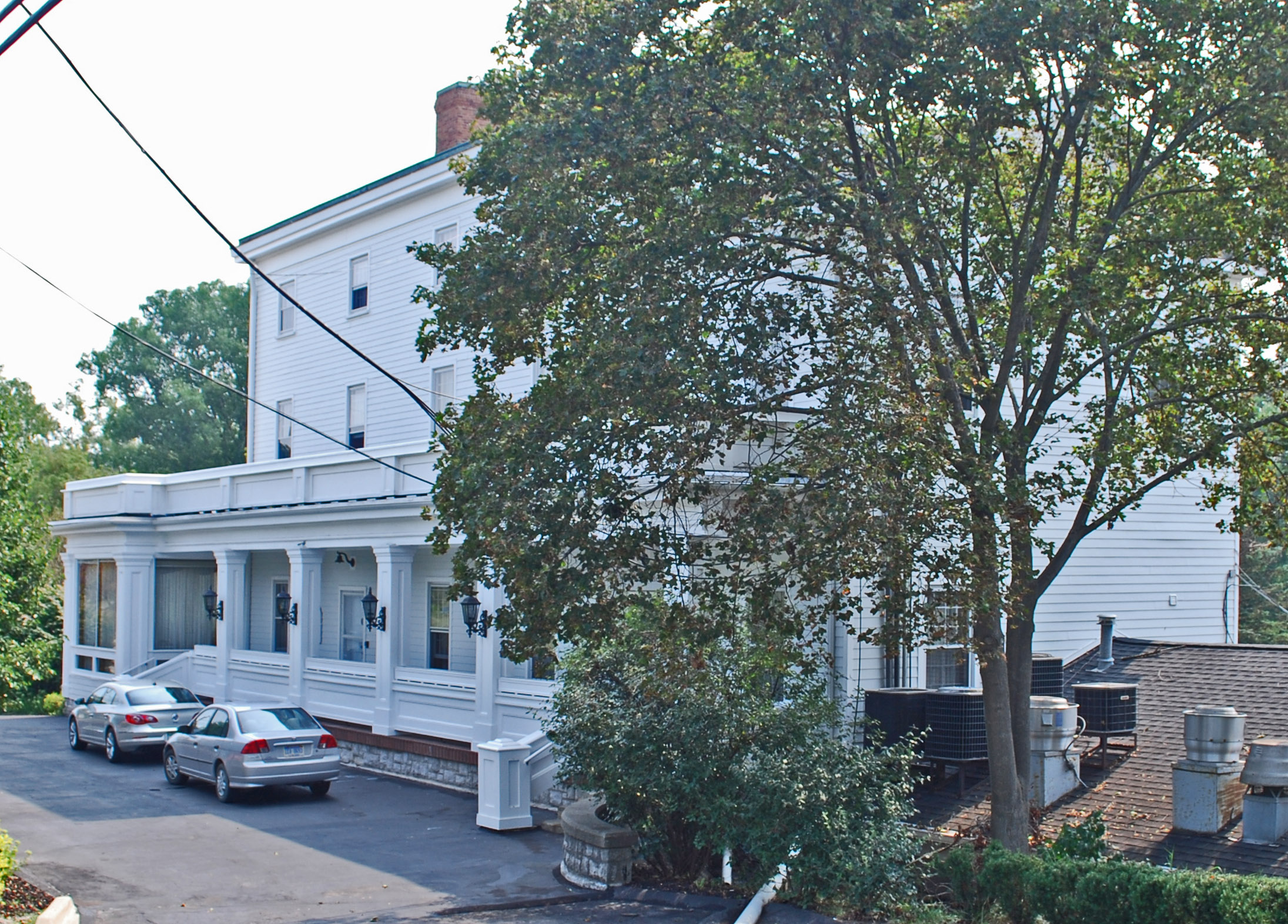

42°9′46″N 83°47′23″W
The Saline plant, also known as the Schuyler Mill, is located at 555-600 Michigan Avenue in Saline, Michigan. In 1845, David Schuyler Haywood constructed a gristmill at this site on the western edge of Saline, Michigan. A small settlement, Barnegat, soon coalesced around the mill site; Barnegat was annexed by the village of Saline in 1848. However, by 1865, business declined, and the mill was soon closed.

Henry Ford purchased the site in 1936, refurbished it, and opened it as a soybean processing plant in 1938. The site employed up to 19 people, who removed the soybean oil from the beans, which was processed into plastics and paint. The residuals were used to make casting cores or for cattle feed. In 1943, Ford moved a one-room Greek Revival schoolhouse to the site and refurbished it as a residence. However, the plant was closed in 1947, not long after Henry Ford's death.

After its closure the building was used by a private soybean processing firm. However, the processing equipment was soon obsolete, and in 1962, the property was turned into an antique shop and general store, know first as the "Sauk Trail Inn". and later as "Weller's Country Store." More recently, part of the structure has been used as a cafe and a banquet facility. The mill was listed on the National Register of Historic Places in 1996.

=== Brooklyn site ===
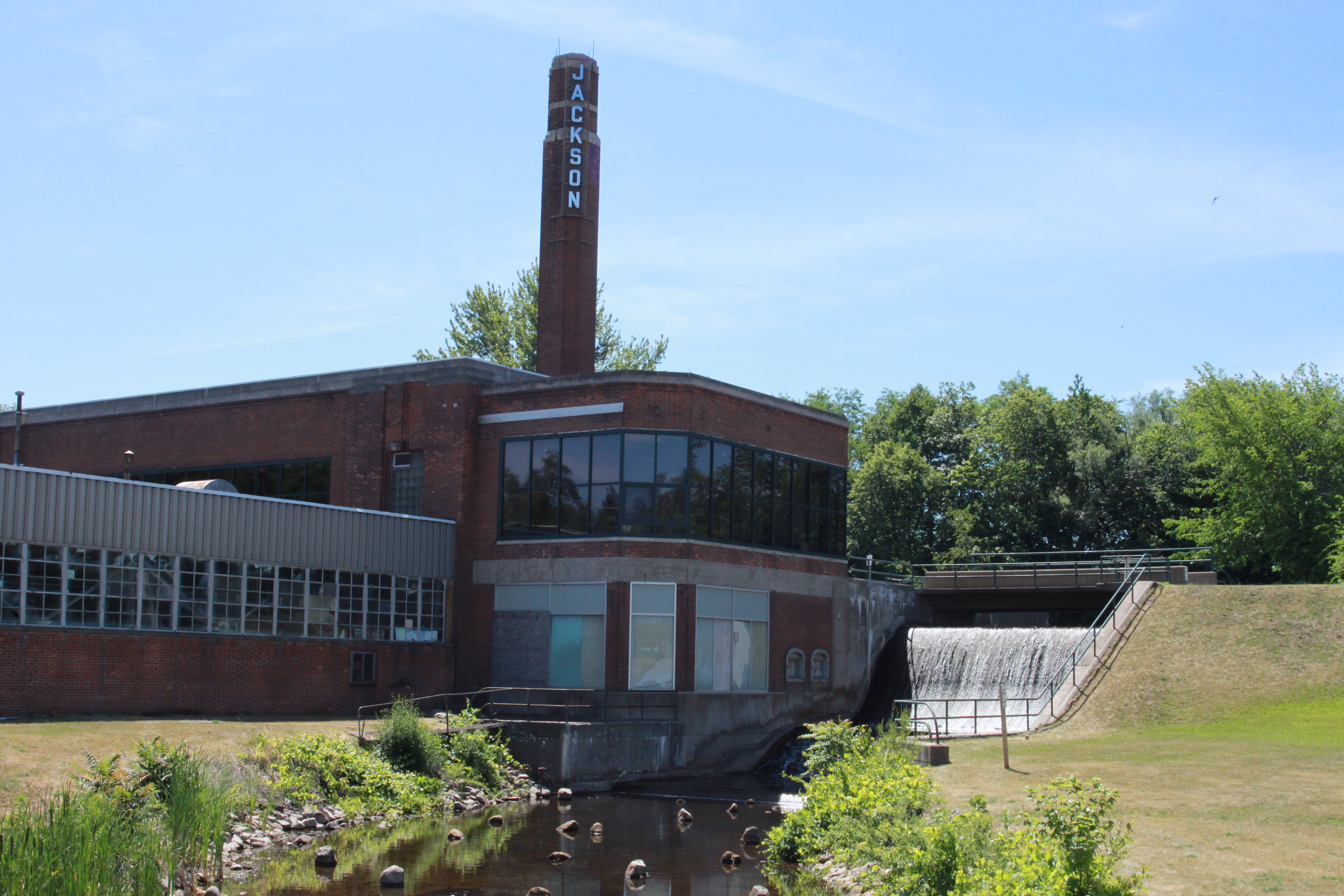
View from Mill Street looking at the River Raisin

42°6′37″N 84°14′44″W
The Brooklyn mill is located at 221 Mill Street in Brooklyn, Michigan. A gristmill, originally built by Calvin Swain c. 1832, originally stood at this site. The small village that grew around the mill was originally called Swainsville, but in 1836 the name was changed to Brooklyn. The Brooklyn Mill burned in about 1912.

Henry Ford purchased the property in 1921, but did not use it for some time. Eventually, he constructed a new building constructed on the site, and the plant opened in 1939. It employed up to 130 people making workers horn buttons and starter switches. During World War II, production shifted to brass spark plug bushings for B-24 bombers. After the war, the line returned to making horn buttons and starter switches until 1954, when production shifted to armrests and lamp lenses.

The Brooklyn site closed in 1967. After it was closed, the building was owned by Industrial Automotive Products, a subsidiary of Jackson Gear. The building has been recently used to house a collector's Model T collection. The building was purchased by Daniel and Samantha Ross in 2014 and is being converted into an Irish themed destination called the Old Irish Mill.

=== Sharon Mills site ===
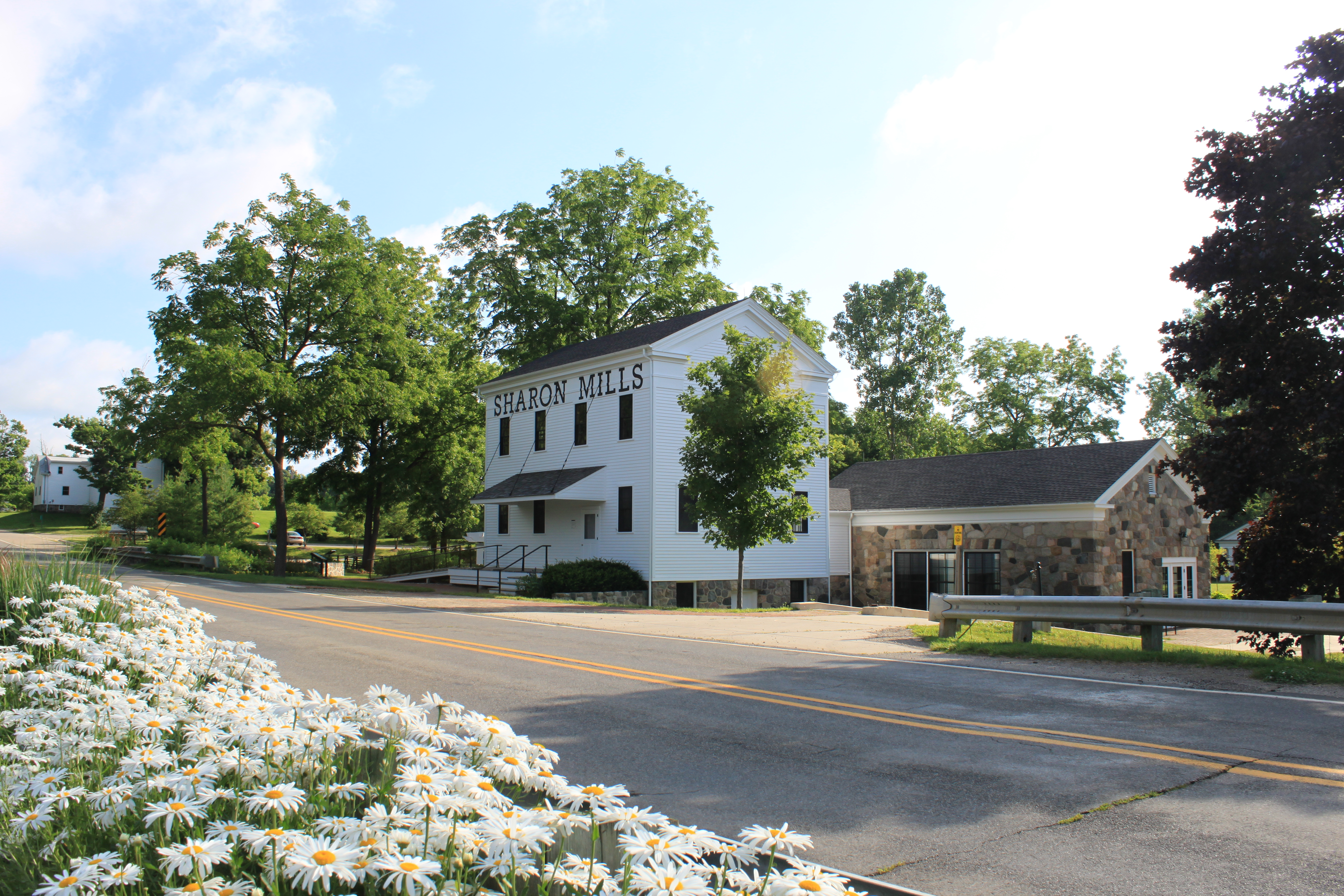

42°10′38″N 84°5′30″W
The Sharon Mills (or Sharon Hollow) plant is located at 5701 Sharon Hollow Road in Sharon, Michigan. In the 1830s, a sawmill was constructed at this site. Later, John Rice built a gristmill here, which was operated by Rice and later the Kirkwood family until the 1920s.

Henry Ford purchased the property in 1926, restored the exquisite Greek Revival mill, and added a wing to the mill and a hydroelectric generator. The plant opened in 1939, employing up to 19 people making cigarette lighters, ammeters, and switches.

The Sharon Mills site closed in 1947. After closure, the building was used primarily as a private residence, with a stint as an antique shop, until the late 1980s. In the 1990s, the site was used as a winery, until 1999, when the property was purchased by the Washtenaw County Park Division for use as a museum and conference center. The county restored the mill, and it currently operates as Sharon Mills Park. The site was designated a state of Michigan historic site in 1989.

=== Manchester site ===
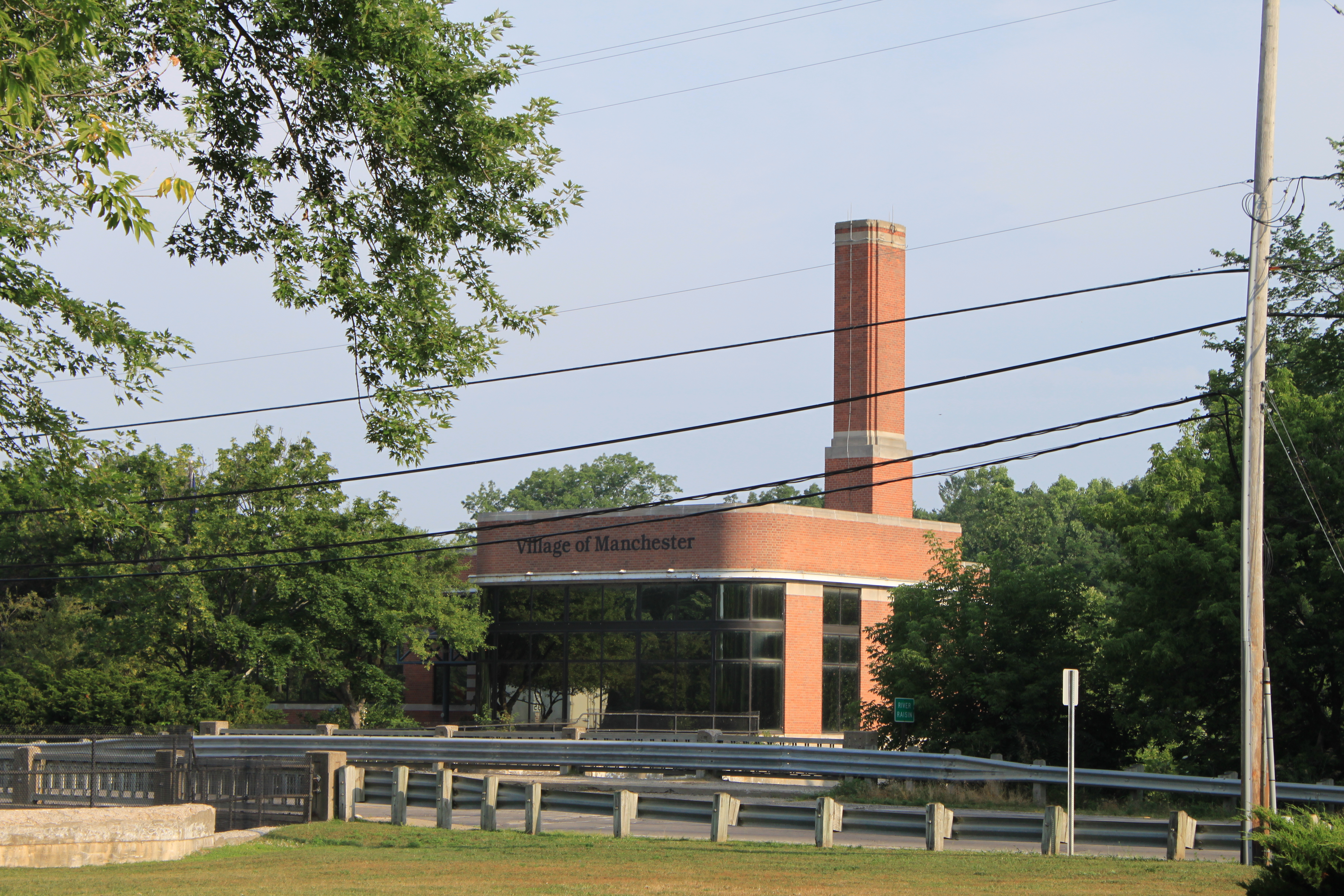

42°9′0″N 84°1′26″W
The Manchester plant was constructed on the site of an old (1892) gristmill east of Manchester, Michigan on Austin Road.

Ford purchased the site in 1936, and spent nearly $800,000 refurbishing, updating, and equipping the plant. The plant opened in 1941, and employed up to 279 people making ammeters, gauges, and instrument clusters.

The Manchester site closed in 1957. In 1960, the plant was sold to a small manufacturer, Thornton Industries. Thornton used it until the early 1970s, after which the building was owned by a series of small manufacturers, including Economy Baler, a maker of scrap compressors, Brooklyn Products, Hoover Universal, Johnson Controls, and Cincinnati Milacron. In 2001, Milacron sold the property to the village of Manchester; the village uses the site to house the public library and village offices.

=== Willow Run site ===
42°14′3″N 83°33′0″W
The Willow Run plant was opened in 1940 in a new building. The plant had a short run with up to 41 people making ignition locks, door locks, and keys; it closed in 1944. The building has been long abandoned.

=== Clarkston site ===
42°44′10″N 83°25′12″W
The Clarkston site is located at 20 West Washington Street in Clarkston, Michigan. Butler Holcomb built a sawmill at this site in 1833. He sold the property to Nelson W. and Jeremiah Clarke. in 1838. The mill, now known as the "Clarkston Mill," changed hands several times, until in the early 20th century it was operated by Charles and Butler Holcomb, grandsons of the original owner. The mill property, apparently unused, changed hands again multiple times in the 1910s. In 1917, the mill was demolished, and in 1920 the Fords purchased the property.

The lot remained vacant for some time, until in 1941 Ford began construction of a factory on the old mill site. The plant opened in 1942, with up to 40 people making drill bushings, straps and seat covers. However, it had a short run and closed in 1947.

In 1950, Hawk Tool and Engineering purchased the building; it was later occupied by the Nason Co., and then sat vacant for several years. In the 1970s, the property was redeveloped into a small shopping mall. Later, much of the space was converted to offices. The site is part of the Clarkston Village Historic District, which was designated a Michigan historic site in 1976 and placed on the National Register of Historic Places in 1980.

=== Cherry Hill site ===
42°18′20″N 83°32′20″W
The Cherry Hill facility was located at the corner of Cherry Hill and Ridge Roads in the village of Cherry Hill, Michigan. Cherry Hill (originally known as "Ridge") was settled in 1825, The Cherry Hill United Methodist Church was built in 1834; in approximately 1865, Abner Hitchcock constructed an inn in the village, naming it the "Cherry Hill House" in reference to the wild cherry trees growing in the area. The town of Ridge soon changed its name to "Cherry Hill." A dairy, the Ypsi Creamery, was also located in Cherry Hill. It was soon replaced by the Detroit Creamery (later the Wilson Dairy), which operated until 1940.

Henry Ford purchased the dairy in about 1940. He converted into another village industry, which opened in 1944. The site and employed 30 people in making ignition locks, door locks, keys, and brass petcocks. The plant was unique in that part of its purpose was to provide work for World War II veterans who suffered physical or mental disabilities die to their wartime service. The plant closed in 1950. The plant was operated by several other companies after Ford stopped using it in 1945: Extruded Hinge from 1950 to 1960, Mather Plastics from 1960 to 1969, William E. Hennells Company from 1969 to 1976, Hennels Company from 1976 to 1983, Ranton, Inc. from 1985 to 1994 and De-Sta-Co (Detroit Stamping Company, a Dover Company) from 1994 to 2012.

The building currently houses privately owned manufacturing facilities. The property is currently owned by The Partnership for Arts and Humanities (Canton) who hope to renovate the property and bring it back into usefulness, while keeping some of Henry Fords ideals in mind. The site was placed on the National Register of Historic Places as part of the Cherry Hill Historic District in 2003.

=== Other sites ===
Although the sites listed above are generally regarded to be part of Ford's village industries program, various other locations could be included depending on the criteria used to differentiate between village industries and small factories. Other sites that could be considered as village industries include plants in Green Island, New York (near Albany, New York) and the Twin Cities Assembly Plant in St. Paul, Minnesota. Additionally, Ford plants in Hamilton, Ohio (just north of Cincinnati), Iron Mountain, Michigan, and Goose Creek, New York boasted hydroelectric plants.
