= Spider9 =

Spider9 Inc.
- Company type: Private
- Industry: Environmental Technology
- Founded: 2011
- Founders: Glynne Townsend, CEO; Dave Park, COO; Bill Beckman; CFO
- Headquarters: Northville, MI, United States
- Products: Advanced control systems for batteries and solar fields
- Number of employees: 10-50
- Website: www.spider9.com

Spider9 Inc. is an American environmental technologies company headquartered in Northville, MI which develops and manufactures advanced control systems for energy storage and solar fields. It was founded in 2011 by Glynne Townsend (A123 Systems), Dave Park (former Vice President of Production at Wave Crest Energy Systems), Dave Smith (former chairman of USABC), and Bill Beckman (former Vice President of Finance at Johnson Controls).

Spider9 acquired control system technology from the University of Michigan, Office of Technology Transfer and is developing the technology at their facilities at the Water Wheel Centre, in the historic Ford Valve Plant.

== History ==
Spider9 was founded on control system technology patents licensed from the University of Michigan Real-Time Computing Laboratory. In the summer of 2011, the Spider9 leadership team brought the technology out of the Office of Technology Transfer, where it had been incubating. In July 2011, Spider9 pivoted the technology's business plan to target grid energy storage and solar field optimization rather than electric vehicles. On November 3, 2011, Spider9 received a Michigan Economic Development Corporation (MEDC) grant to install a solar field on the roof of the Water Wheel Centre in Northville, MI.

== Technology ==
Spider9 systems are capable of reconfiguring the architecture of systems through in-house developed hardware and software algorithms. Using a Spider9 system, individual cells and panels are monitored and managed. The system architecture is dynamically reconfigured around the components to deliver a consistent voltage output, compensating for performance variances and failures.

== Facilities ==
Spider9's facilities are equipped with a waterwheel designed by Albert Kahn (architect) which once provided constant, sustainable hydroelectric power to the facility. The waterwheel no longer fulfills the electricity needs of the building. Spider9 is designing a control system for an 85 kW rooftop solar field with backup battery storage to supply the building with renewable power.
