= Edward N. Hines Park =

Linear park in Western Wayne County, Michigan

Hines Park
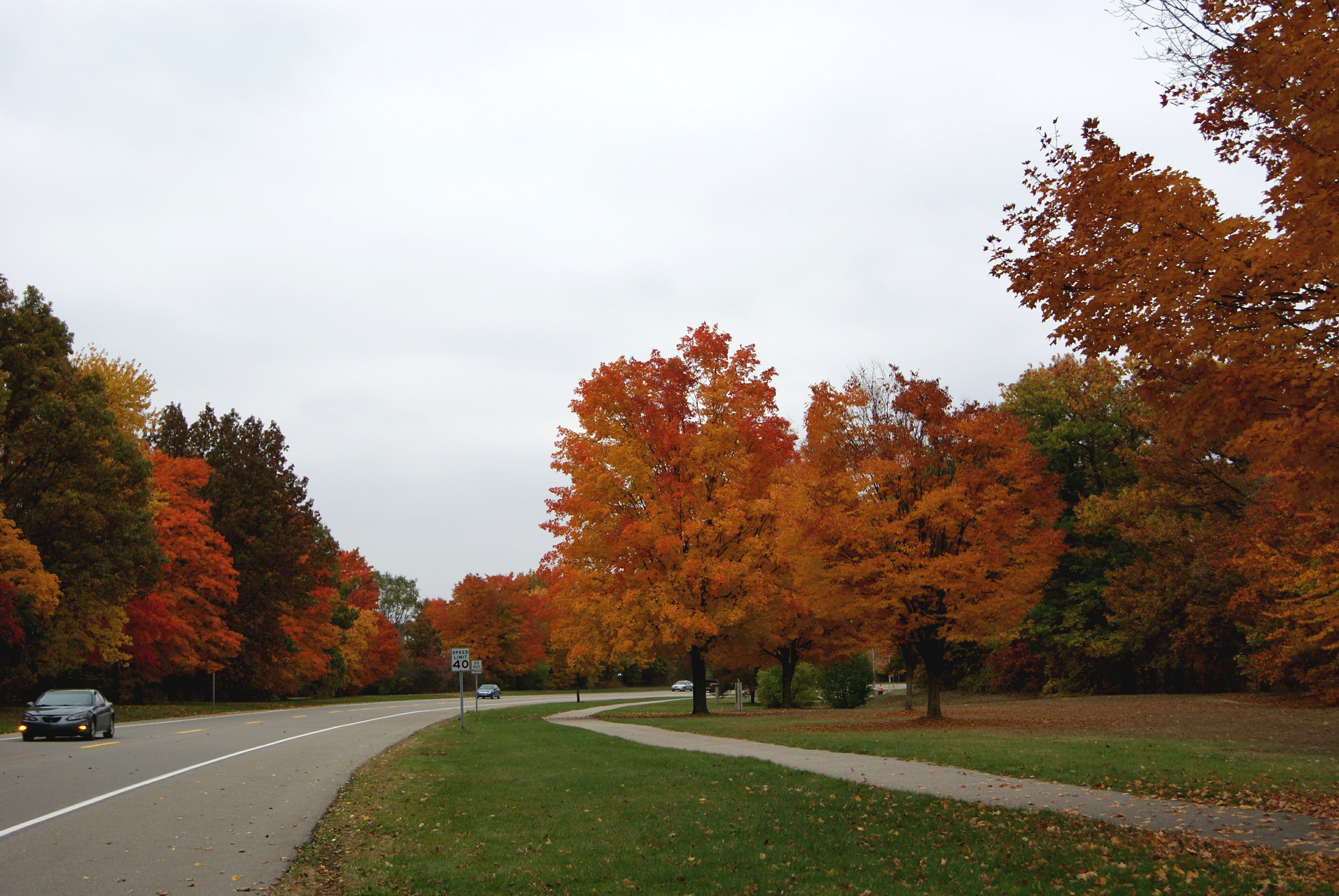
- Fall colors at Nankin Lake, near the park's midpoint
- Interactive map of Hines Park
- Type: Linear park; Parkway
- Location: Western Wayne County, Michigan
- Coordinates: 42°20′35″N 83°21′9″W
- Area: 2,300 acres (9.3 km^{2})
- Manager: Wayne County Parks
- Length: 17.5 mi (28.2 km)
- Website: www.waynecountymi.gov/Parks-Recreation/Pick-A-Park/Hines-Park

Hines Park is a linear park in western Wayne County, Michigan, following the course of the Middle River Rouge. Hines Park serves as a flood control mechanism for the Middle Rouge, which experiences frequent floods due to its heavily urbanized drainage basin. Hines Park consists of 25 recreation areas linked by Edward N. Hines Drive, a 17.5-mile (28.2 km) scenic drive.

Hines Park is named after Edward N. Hines, a member of the Wayne County Road Commission who advocated for the park's creation. The park was initially known as the Middle Rouge Parkway, and it incorporates multiple structures donated by Henry Ford from his village industries project. Hines Park begins at 7 Mile Road in Northville and runs downstream to Ford Road in Dearborn, connecting to multiple regional recreation facilities and trails, including the I-275 Metro Trail and Rouge Park.

== Description ==
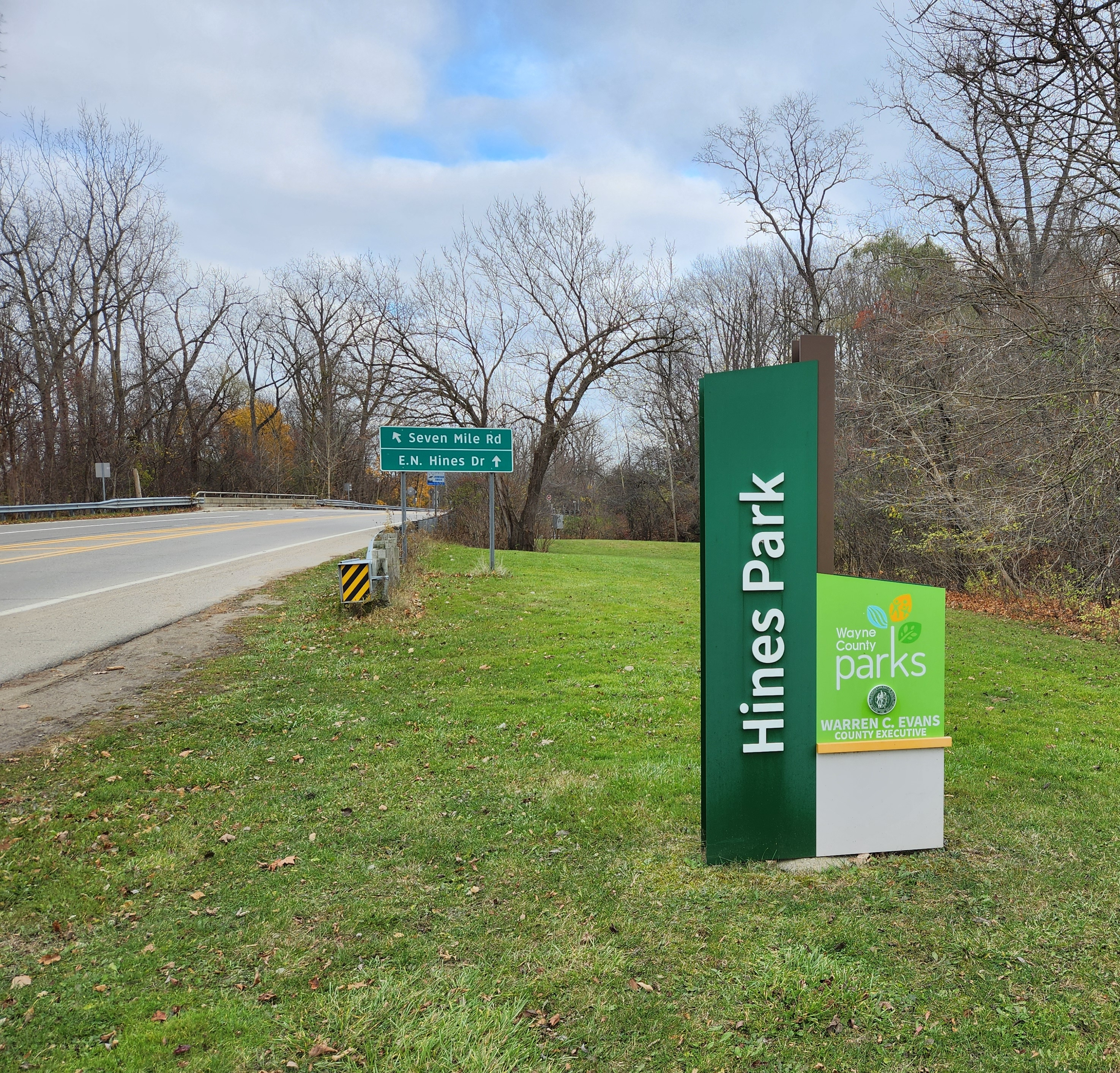
Hines Park's northern entrance at 7 Mile Road in Northville

Hines Park is a linear park, following the entire course of the Middle River Rouge from Northville to Dearborn. The Middle Rouge is one of three major tributaries of the River Rouge, a river in Southeast Michigan that drains much of the western suburbs of Detroit. The Middle Rouge forms in Northville at the confluence of the Walled Lake Branch and the Johnson Drain. It flows through the cities of Plymouth, Westland, and Livonia to its confluence with the main stem of the Rouge at Ford Road on the Dearborn–Dearborn Heights border.

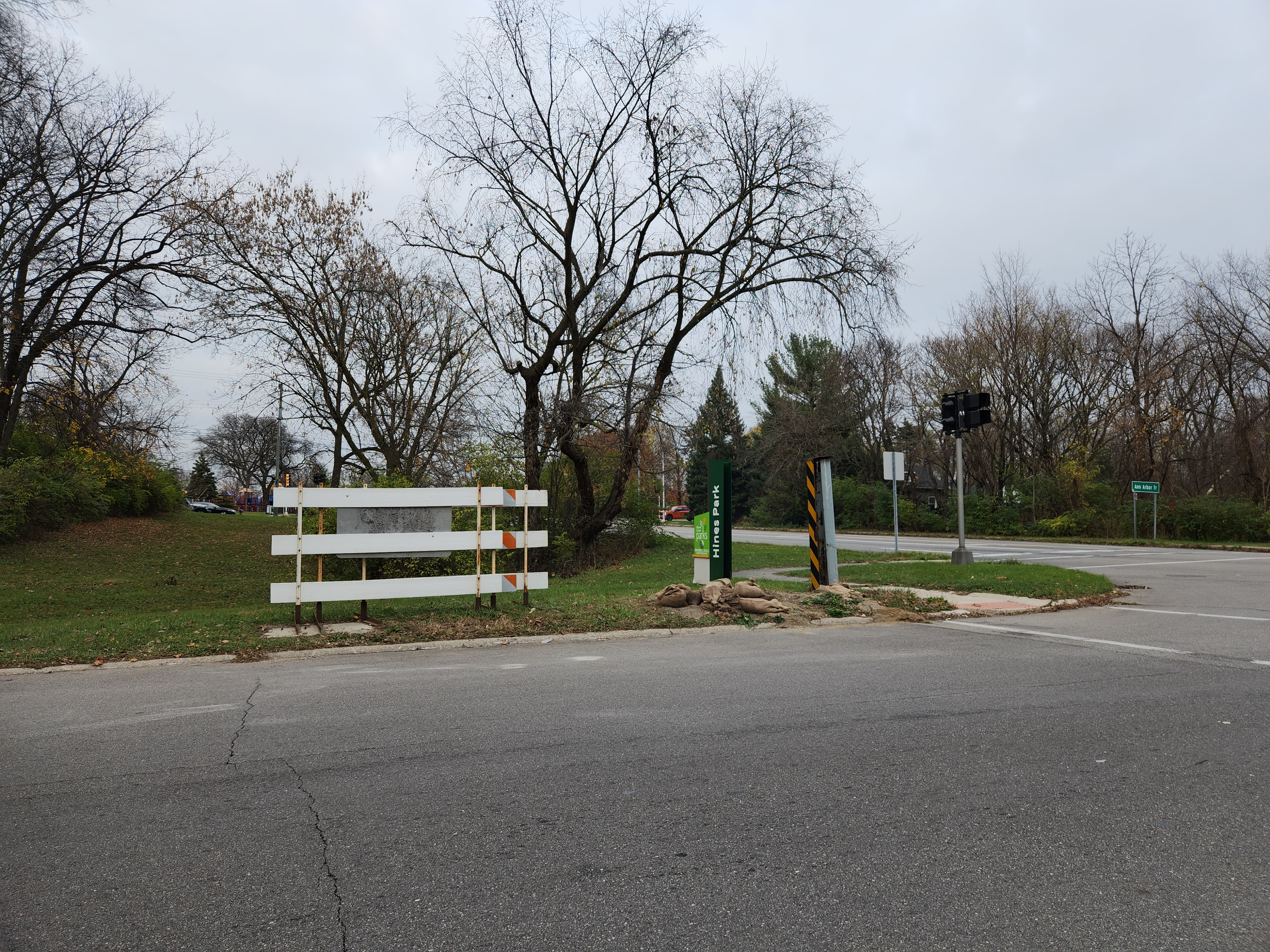
Gates and barricades staged at a park entrance in Dearborn Heights, reflecting the park's nature as a floodplain

The entire park is a floodplain, and portions of Hines Park are regularly closed to the public during heavy rains. This flooding is by design, and Hines Park helps protect the rest of the Middle Rouge watershed from severe flooding.

Hines Park connects with multiple regional parks and trails. In Plymouth Township, the I-275 Metro Trail runs within Hines Park, routing bicyclists and pedestrians around I-275's interchange with M-14. At the downstream end, Hines Park connects to Detroit's Rouge Park, a large urban park on the main stem of the Rouge.

== Amenities ==
The 25 recreation areas of Hines Park feature a variety of amenities. Baseball diamonds, soccer fields, picnic shelters, and hiking trails are located throughout the park, and restrooms are available at some recreation areas. Nankin Mills, near the park's midpoint, features an interpretive center and the Wayne County Parks customer service center.

The Hines Park Trail runs the length of the park, providing a dedicated path for pedestrians and cyclists from Northville to Dearborn. Approximately 14 miles (23 km) of dedicated mountain bike trails run from Newburgh Lake to Hawthorne Ridge, with a mountain bike skills course at Hawthorne Ridge. Fishing piers are available on all four lakes in Hines Park, and sledding hills are located at Cass Benton and Middlebelt Hill.

== History ==
=== Industry on the Middle Rouge ===
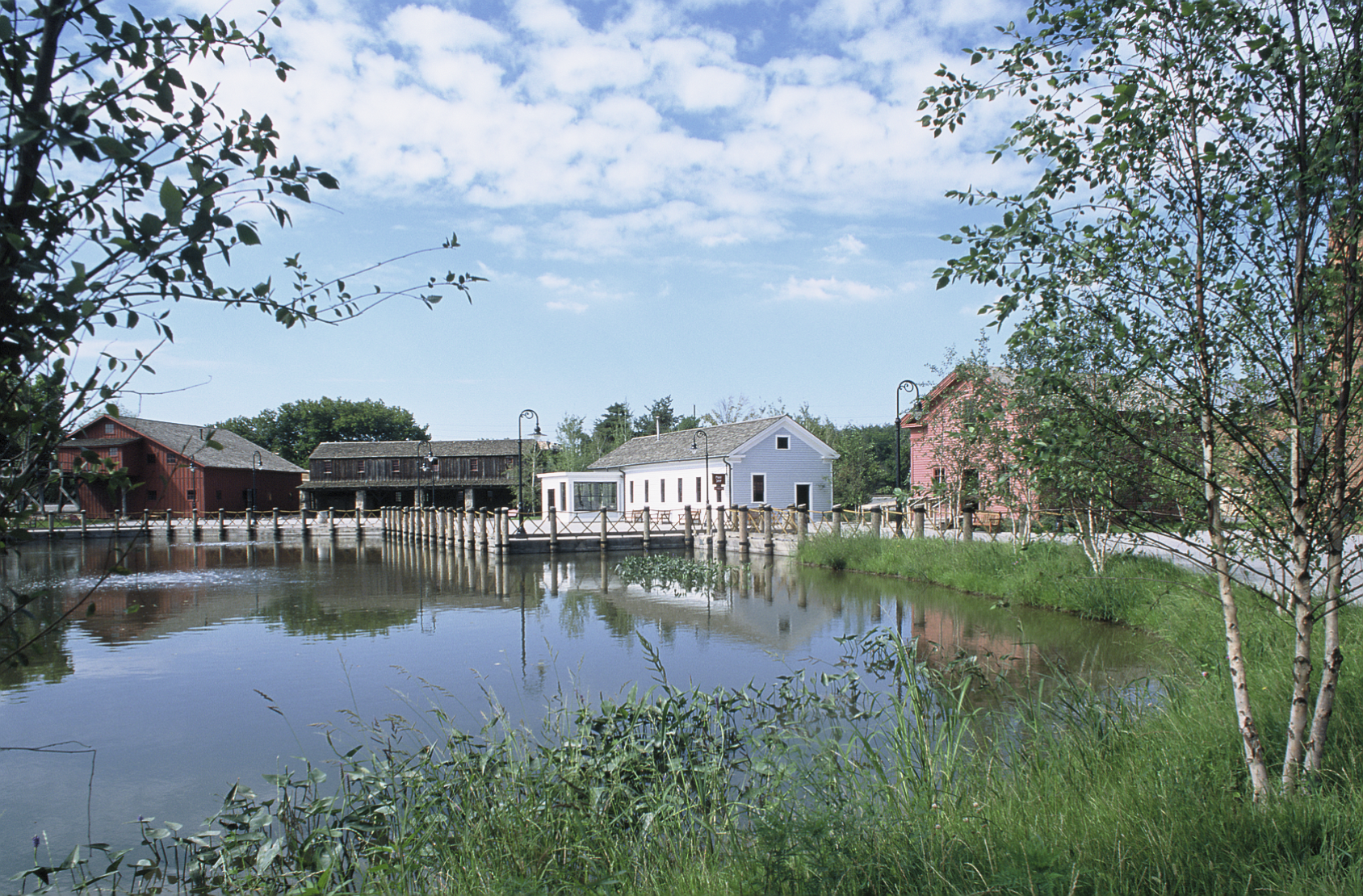
The original Gunsolly Carding Mill building (right), on display at Greenfield Village

The present-day Hines Park is located on the Middle River Rouge, whose landscape changed dramatically in the 19th century. The Plymouth Mill (later the Wilcox Mill) opened in 1820, the Nankin Mill in 1842, and the Gunsolly Carding Mill in 1851, altering the landscape and serving as the center of local economies. Henry Ford contributed to the creation of Hines Park, and in his childhood he was a frequent visitor to the mills along the Middle Rouge. Ford was born in 1863, and he and his parents regularly traveled 20 miles (32 km) from Springwells Township to the Gunsolly Mill to have the wool from their sheep carded.

The Rouge River watershed has flooded regularly, even before the introduction of industry and later urban development. The Rouge watershed is defined by its clay-rich soil, which functions as a natural impervious surface.

In the early 20th century, Henry Ford and the Ford Motor Company drastically changed the landscape of the River Rouge, building the massive Rouge complex downstream in the 1910s and 20s. In parallel with his massive developments downstream on the Rouge, Henry Ford also had visions for the Rouge further upstream, which was still mostly undeveloped. In Ford's vision, articulated in a 1924 interview, he desired to "Put up a nice dam and a factory, and the first thing you know, everything and everybody will be better." Ford's vision of decentralized rural manufacturing contrasted with his company's massive urban manufacturing complexes, a contradiction that apparently did not bother him.

Ford realized this vision as the "village industries" project, which began with 4 sites on the Middle Rouge, on the site of former grist mills. Ford reached an agreement with the Wayne County Road Commission, where the road commission would rebuild dams on the Middle Rouge at Phoenix, Wilcox, Nankin and Newburgh Mills. Ford would operate the village industries at the sites as an experiment, and the land would be deeded to the road commission when the experiment concluded. The village industries continued operating through World War II, supporting Ford Motor Company's contribution to the war effort.

=== Creation of the Middle Rouge Parkway ===
Hines Park was created by the Wayne County Road Commission, a governmental entity that was founded by promoters of the Good Roads Movement. Its three founding members, Cassius Benton, Henry Ford, and Edward N. Hines, each had a stake in the creation of the contemporary Hines Park. Benton and Ford resigned after one year following a legal battle, but Hines remained the head of the board until his death.

A state law passed in 1913 allowed Wayne County to create a county park system, but little progress was made until the early 1920s. The road commission also served as the Board of County Park Trustees, and their inaugural project was the creation of a scenic parkway along the Middle Rouge River. Land acquisition for the parkway began in the early 1920s, with the donation of a parcel in Northville Township, and continued through the Great Depression. During the Great Depression, the county acquired 775 acres (3.14 km^{2}) of land along the Middle Rouge, and assigned Works Progress Administration workers to build a concrete parkway and numerous recreation facilities along the Middle Rouge. The Middle Rouge Parkway, then still under construction, was renamed for Hines in 1937. Hines died in 1938.

The village industries remained a personal interest of Henry Ford throughout his life, but they began to close as he aged and lost control of Ford Motor Company. Ford's grandson Henry Ford II viewed the project as wasteful and dismantled most of the village industries in 1947, the year of the elder Ford's death. The Ford Motor Company fulfilled the promise of donating the village industries to Wayne County, and the four former mills became part of the parkway that year. In the years following World War II, the parkway was extended downstream from Newburgh Lake to Warren Avenue, mostly completing its path along the course of the Middle Rouge.

=== Decline and cleanup efforts ===
The nature center at Nankin Mills closed in 1979 due to budget cuts, and maintenance in the rest of the park was deferred. A parks millage was passed by Wayne County voters in 1996, providing a dedicated funding source for county parks, and beginning the reversal of Hines Park's decline.

Due to its industrial history and the runoff from its surroundings, the entire River Rouge watershed has been subject to significant pollution. The issue came to prominence in 1969, when spilled oil on the river's main stem in Detroit caught fire. Putting out the fire required a crew of 65 firefighters, 10 fire trucks, and the fireboat John Kendall. The International Joint Commission designated the entire watershed as a Great Lakes Area Of Concern in 1987, and cleanup efforts have continued since then.

On the Middle Rouge, a major project in 1997 and 1998 removed over 300,000 short tons (270,000 t; 270,000 long tons) of PCB-contaminated sediment from Newburgh Lake. Other restoration projects include the elimination of combined sewer overflows from municipalities throughout the watershed, and the reversal of channelization. As a result, the Middle Rouge has become less prone to flooding, and dissolved oxygen levels have risen substantially. The Middle Rouge has become even healthier in the 21st century, as represented by its fishery. Measurements taken in Plymouth Township on the Middle Rouge show that from 2002 to 2018, fish abundance increased by over 100%, and fish diversity increased from 6 species to over 10.

=== Redevelopment of the village industries ===
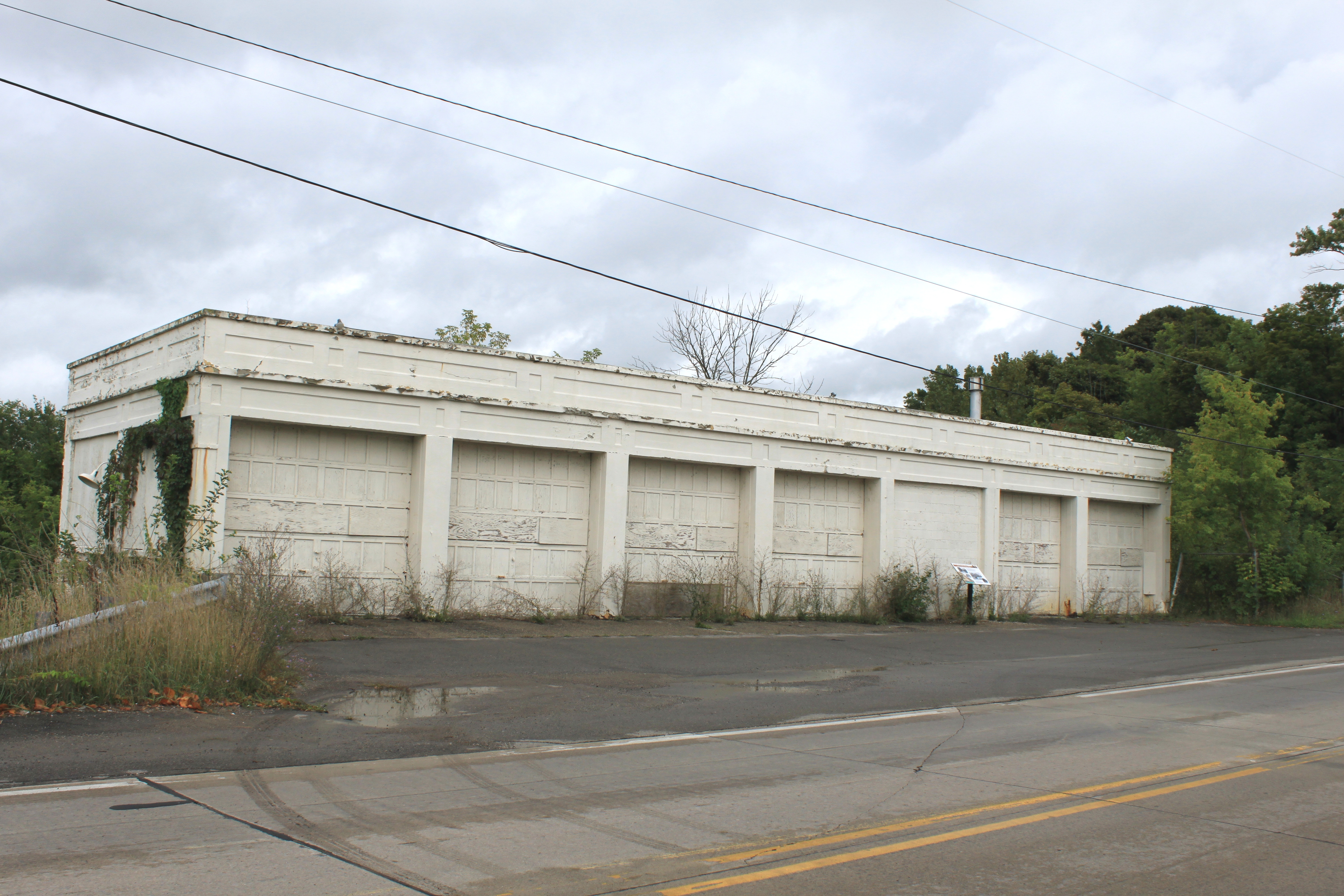
The former Plymouth Mill, 2011

Wayne County sold the Warren Valley Golf Course, located at the downstream end of the park, to the city of Dearborn Heights in 2018. The sale to the city occurred after the county proposed to sell the site to a private developer to build housing, a plan that was criticized by the public. The Phoenix Mill, Wilcox Mill, and Newburgh Mill were also sold to private entities, with adaptive reuse projects planned for all three.

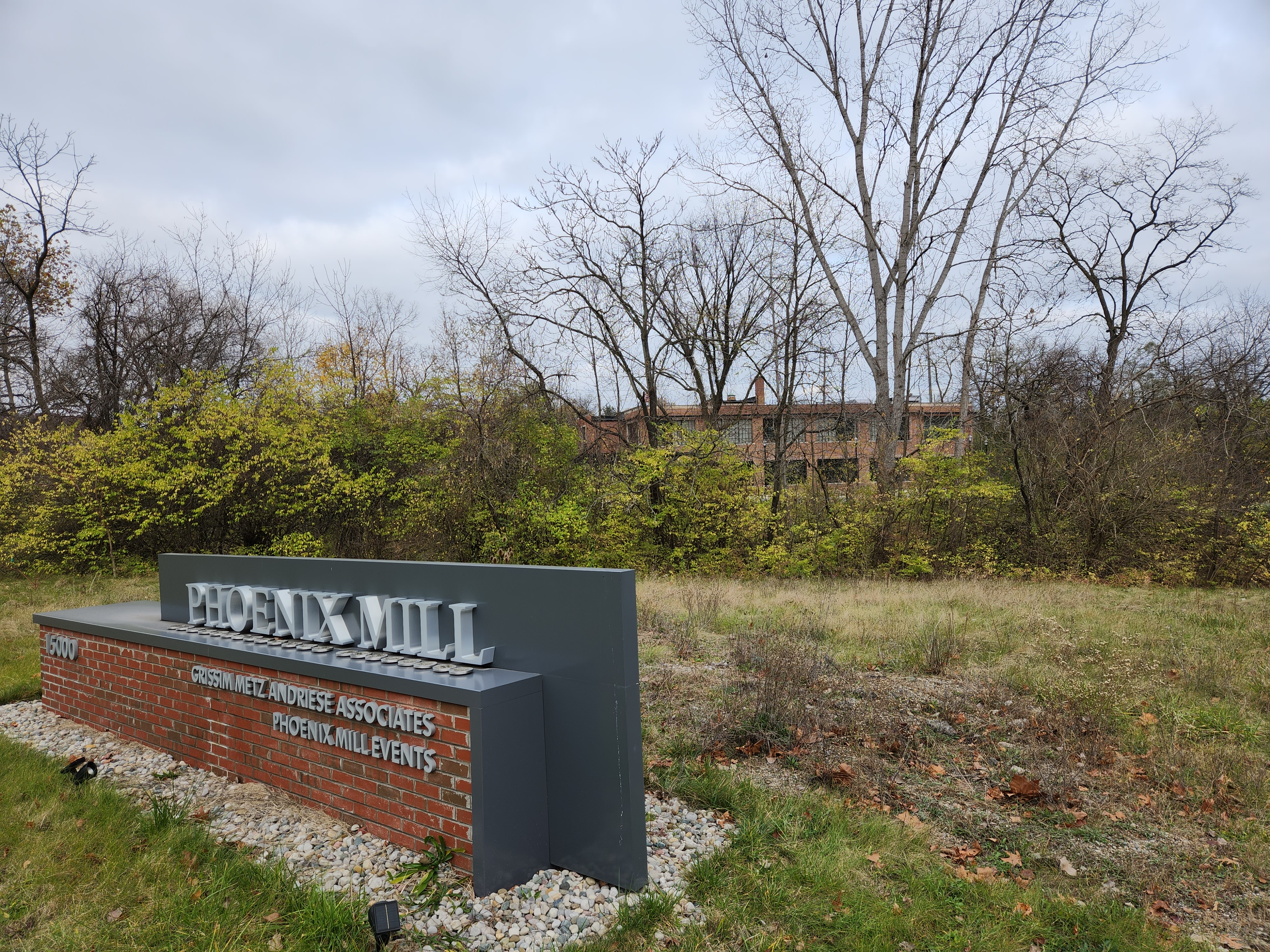
The former Phoenix Mill has been redeveloped as offices and a banquet hall

The Wilcox Mill was planned to be renovated as a community art center led by local artist Tony Roko, but plans were abandoned in 2021 due to COVID-19 pandemic-related financial difficulties. The Phoenix Mill was sold to another local developer, who reopened it as offices and a banquet hall in 2022. The Newburgh Mill, then used as a stable for the Wayne County Sheriff's mounted division, was sold on the condition that the developer find a new site for the stables. As of February 2023, work has not yet started on the Newburgh Mill site.

== Programming and events ==
The Saturday in the Park program closes part of Hines Park to cars on Saturdays during the summer, making Hines Drive available exclusively for pedestrians and cyclists. The program closes Hines Drive to vehicle traffic from Nankin Mills downstream to Outer Drive, a distance of approximately 7 miles (11 km). From Nankin Mills to Outer Drive, Hines Drive is separated from cross traffic by bridges, providing an uninterrupted walking and cycling path.

Cruisin' Hines, an annual classic car show and parade, is hosted by Hines Park every August. Cruisin' Hines is one of many classic car events in Southeast Michigan in late summer, which also includes the Woodward Dream Cruise. Cruisin' Hines began in 2011, and attracts thousands of classic cars every year.

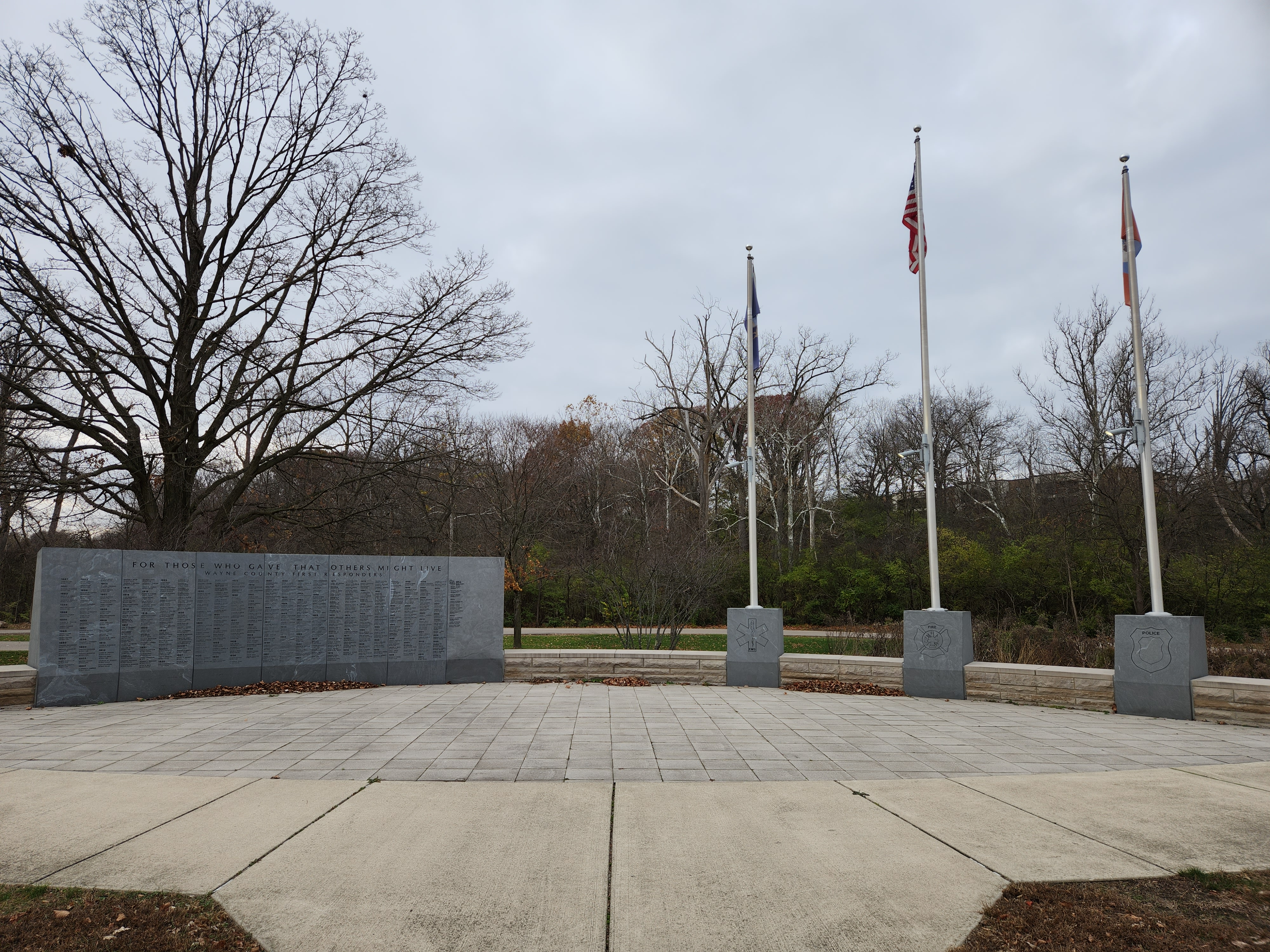
The Wayne County First Responders Memorial

The Heroes on Hines run is presented by Wayne County Parks annually in September, with its start and finish line at the First Responders Memorial. The 5K run raises funds for the upkeep of the First Responders Memorial, and was first held in 2013.

Hines Park is the site of the annual Wayne County Lightfest, a drive-through light show featuring giant animated holiday-themed displays. Lightfest began in 1993, and sees hundreds of thousands of visitors every November and December.

== See also ==
- River Rouge Park
