= I-275 Metro Trail =

Bicycle trail in Wayne and Oakland counties, Michigan

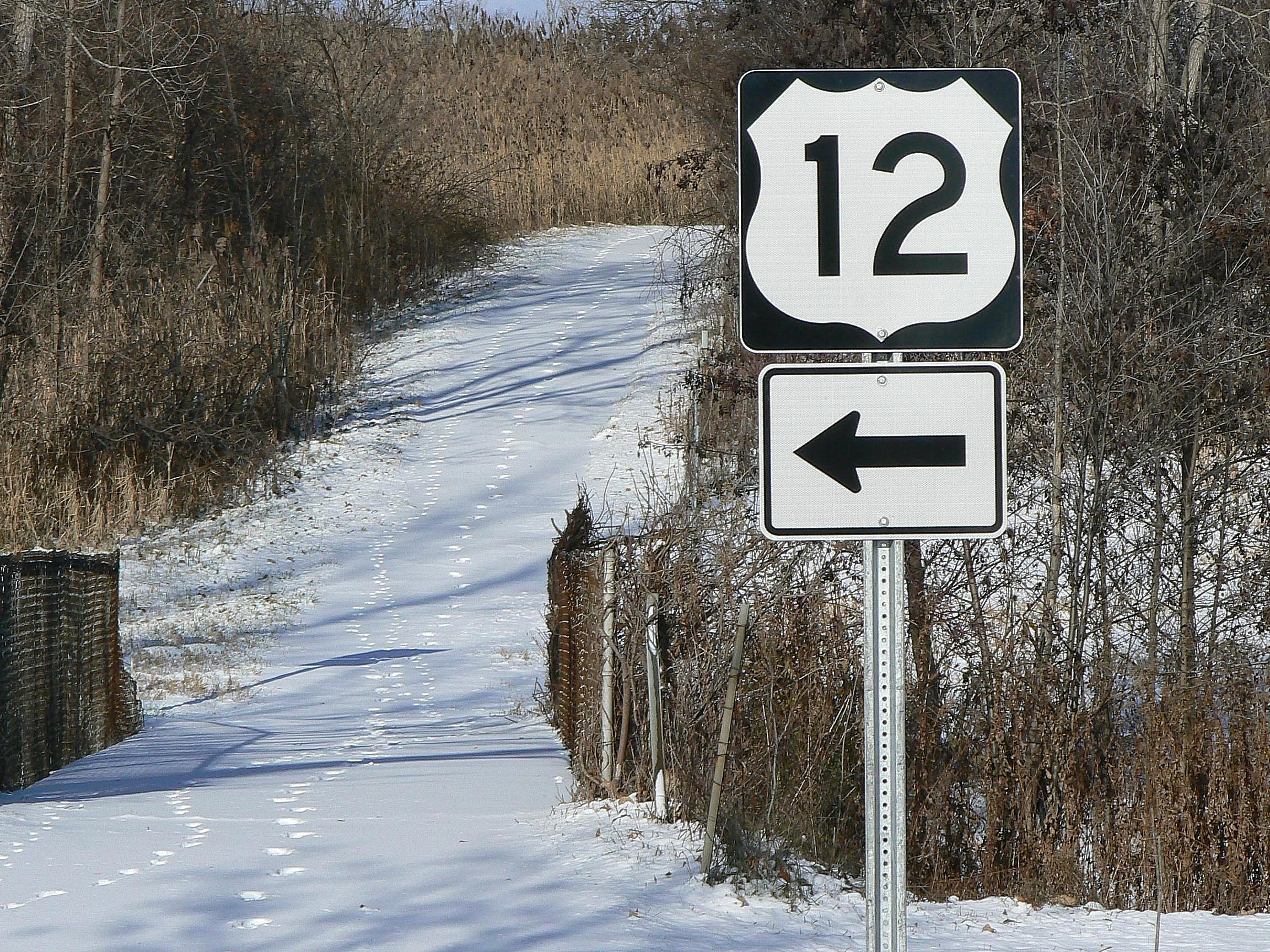
- I-275 Metro Trail in Canton, December 2008
- Length: 31.6 mi (50.9 km)
- Location: Wayne, and Oakland counties
- Trailheads: 2
- Use: Hiking, biking

The I-275 Metro Trail is a bicycle trail in Wayne and Oakland counties in the US state of Michigan.

== History ==
The Michigan Department of Transportation (MDOT) built a bike trail parallel to I-275 in the mid-1970s. This I-275 Bikeway was constructed as a reply to the 1970s energy crisis, along a 31.6-mile (50.9 km) stretch in Monroe, Wayne and Oakland counties. This path is 8 feet (2.4 m) wide and runs at least 30 feet (9 m) from the freeway, fenced off from adjacent landowners. It was not well-maintained originally, but it was being improved in the first decade of the 21st century. There are 24 access points to the trail located at major cross roads along the route. The trail is one of a network approved in June 1974, and the state originally planned it to follow almost all 60 miles (97 km) of I-275 at the time, including the unbuilt segment north of Novi.

Since 2006, the Michigan Trails & Greenway Alliance and MDOT have been working to improve the bike trail. At the time of the alliance's initial studies, the trail was overgrown with vegetation in locations. The study focused on areas of needed improvement after meeting with members of the public in the communities surrounding the bike path. In August 2009, MDOT held an open house to discuss construction work planned to improve the trail. Further impacts by MDOT to the bikeway included closures in 2010 during reconstruction projects underway on the I-275 freeway. Since a grand re-opening in 2011, the bike path has been called the I-275 Metro Trail. In the middle of 2015, MDOT completed reconstruction of the bike trail, resulting in a paved trail from a junction with the Downriver Linked Greenways East–West Trail near South Huron Road northward to 12 Mile Road in Novi.
