= North Milford Village Historic District =

- U.S. National Register of Historic Places
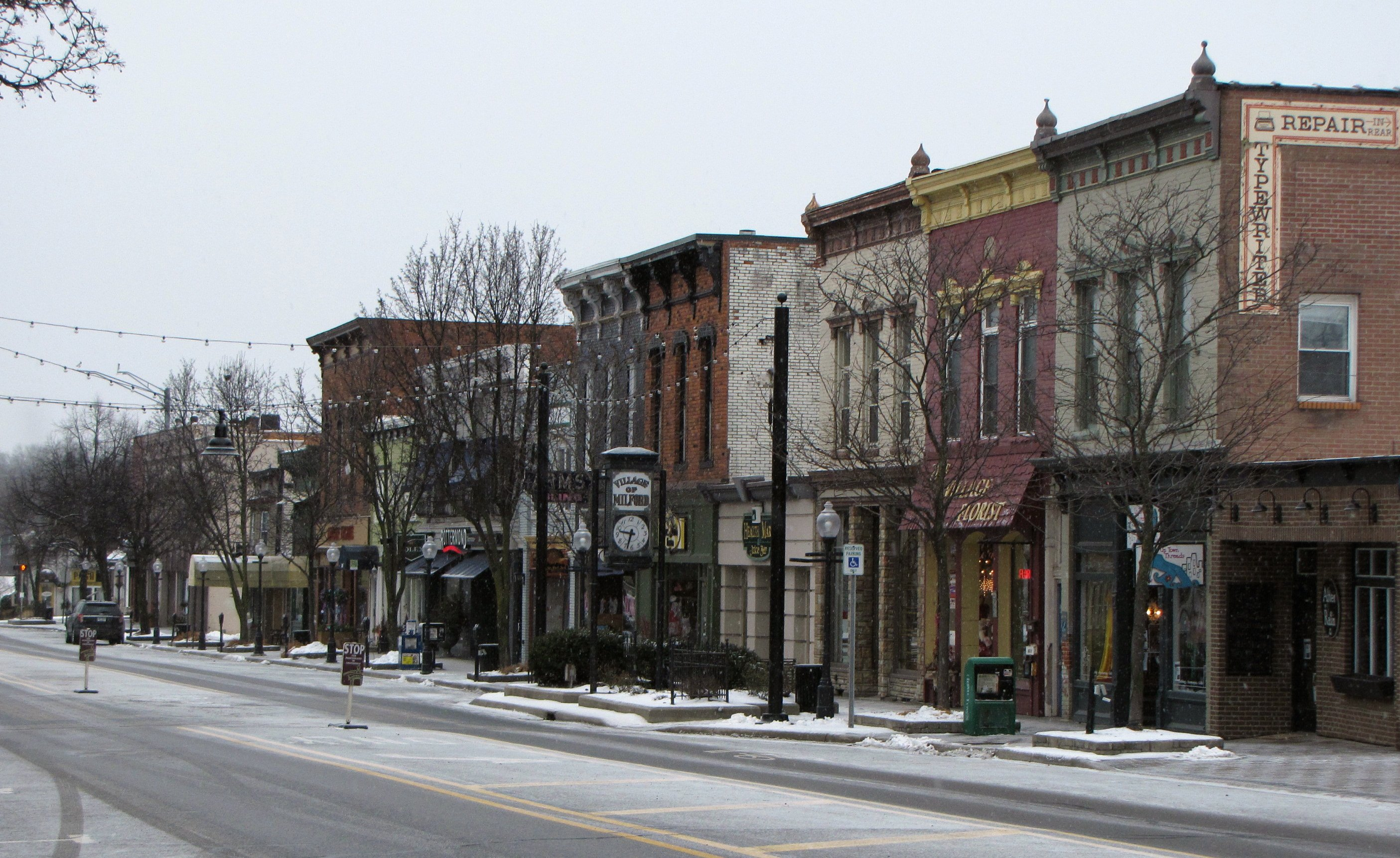
- Main Street at Center Park, looking south
- Interactive map
- Location: Historic area of North Milford Village, Milford, Michigan
- Coordinates: 42°35′26″N 83°35′51″W
- Area: 155 acres (63 ha)
- Architect: Harry J. Rill, et.al.
- Architectural style: Greek Revival, Italianate, et.al.
- NRHP reference No.: 00000391
- Added to NRHP: April 21, 2000

The North Milford Village Historic District is a historic district located in Milford, Michigan, including the commercial area along Main Street from the Huron River to Summit, industrial areas around the mill ponds west of Main, and residential areas east of Main. The district was listed on the National Register of Historic Places in 2000.

== History ==
Milford was first settled in 1832, when Elizur and Stanley Ruggles established a sawmill here. The Ruggles sold to Stephen and John Armstrong in 1836, and the Armstrongs added a gristmill in 1839. North Milford Village was platted in 1838 by Aaron Phelps, who also dammed Pettibone Creek to create the still extant millponds. However, by the early 1840s Phelps ran into financial difficulties and sold out to the Hebbard brothers, who established an industrial park in North Milford. Soon a number of mills were located along Pettibone Creek, along with other industrial operations.

As industry grew, so did the commercial ventures along Main Street, and the residential section of town grew to house the new residents of Milford. The railroad came through Milford in 1871, causing a building boom both in the industrial and commercial enterprises now provided with an easy mode of transport. The majority of the commercial structures in Milford were built between 1872 and 1898. New stores included taverns, lumber yards, grocers and dry goods stores, drug stores, tailors, restaurants, and more. The residential section of town also expanded greatly, with Victorian houses joining the previous Greek Revival structures. New larger church buildings were also constructed.

In the twentieth century, the rise of the automobile brought new auto-related businesses. These included service stations, but also a new Ford Motor Company plant on the mill pond, and General Motors' Milford proving grounds outside of town. Newer houses were constructed to meet the needs of the influx of workers. In the period after World War II, Milford has avoided the urban renewal process, leaving a healthy cross-section of historical structures within the district intact.

== Description ==
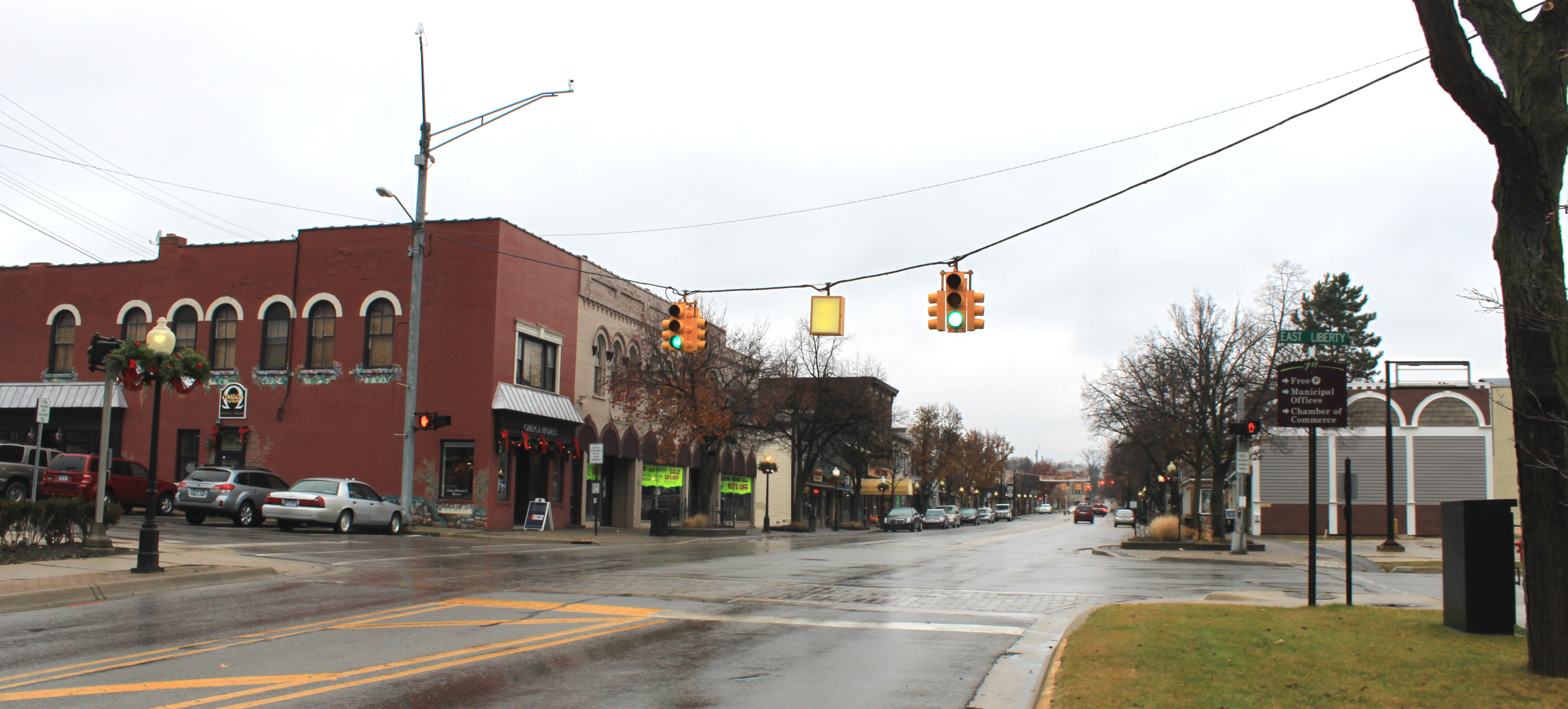
Main Street at Liberty, looking north

The North Milford Village Historic District consists of a three-block section of commercial buildings along Milford's North Main Street, along with adjacent residential areas along five east-west streets and six north-south streets, and the two historic mill ponds along Pettibone Creek. The district contains 312 structures, 255 of which contribute to the historical character of the district. The commercial district includes two- and three-story buildings primarily of brick and concrete block, in Italianate, Commercial brick, Tudor Revival, and Art Deco styles. The residential portion of the district contains wood frame, stone, concrete block and brick houses in a range of architectural styles, including Greek Revival, Italianate, Victorian Gothic, Late Victorian, Second Empire, Queen Anne, Stick, Chateauesque, Vernacular, Tudor Revival, Dutch Colonial Revival, Bungalow, Craftsman, English style and Cape Cod. The district also contains four historic churches.

== See also ==
- National Register of Historic Places listings in Oakland County, Michigan
