= Edward N. Hines =

American civil engineer (1870–1938)

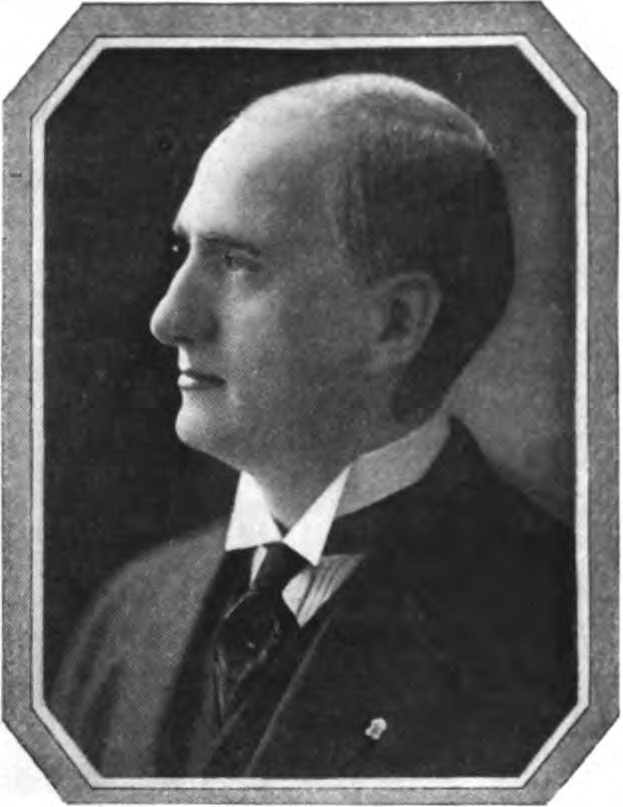
- Portrait of Hines, circa 1914
- Born: January 13, 1870; St. Louis
- Died: June 4, 1938 (aged 68); Detroit
- Awards: Paul Mijksenaar Award (2011)

Edward Norris Hines (January 13, 1870 – June 4, 1938) was a member of the Wayne County Road Commission (of Wayne County, Michigan), from 1906 to 1938. A printer by trade, he is one of the great innovators in road development.

== Career ==
As a cyclist in 1890, Hines formed a Good Roads organisation in Michigan which advocated for the development of county roads. This led to the passage of the County Road Law in 1893, and a change to Michigan's Constitution in 1894. During this time, Hines was president of the Detroit Wheelmen cycling club, chief consul of League of American Wheelmen's Michigan Division, and vice-president of the League of American Wheelmen.

Hines was appointed to the Wayne County Board of Roads at its inception in 1906, along with Henry Ford and Cassius R. Benton. In 1909, Hines was responsible for the construction of the first full mile of concrete road pavement in the world, the stretch of Woodward Avenue between Six Mile Road and Seven Mile Road in Detroit.

Hines originated the concept of painting a line down the center of a road to separate traffic in opposing directions. The idea came to him after watching a leaky milk wagon leave a trail down the street. Painted center lines were first used in 1911 on River Road in Trenton, in Wayne County. This simple idea has since been recognized as one of the most important single traffic safety devices in the history of highway transportation. Snow removal from public roads was another of Hines' innovations.

Hines, along with William E. Metzger and others, formed the Detroit Automobile Club in 1916. Hines was a national leader in the concept of landscaping highway rights-of-way. He was instrumental in movements to beautify highways by eliminating power lines and billboards. In the 1920s, Hines was a leader in the movement to acquire land along the Huron River and the Rouge River for the purpose of converting them into parks. In 1937, the Middle Rouge Parkway was renamed the Edward N. Hines Parkway, in his honor.

== Honors and recognition ==
- In 1935, Hines was awarded the George S. Bartlett Award for outstanding contribution to highway progress.
- He was later inducted into the Michigan Transportation Hall of Honor in 1972.
- and in 2011, Hines received the Paul Mijksenaar Design for Function Award.
