= Ford Valve Plant =

- U.S. National Register of Historic Places
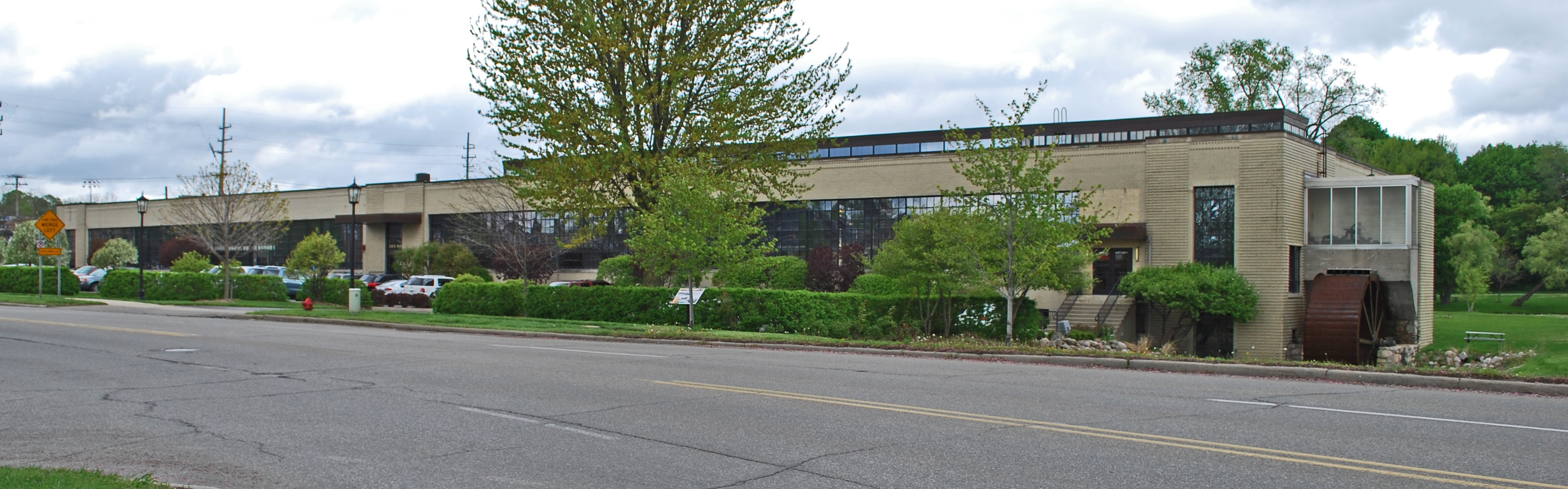
- Ford Valve Plant. Note water wheel at extreme right.

- Location within Michigan Location within the United States
- Interactive map
- Location: 235 E. Main St., Northville, Michigan
- Coordinates: 42°25′56″N 83°28′40″W
- Area: 4 acres (1.6 ha)
- Built: 1936
- Architect: Albert Kahn
- Architectural style: Art Deco
- NRHP reference No.: 95000866
- Added to NRHP: August 01, 1995

The Ford Valve Plant is a factory building located at 235 East Main Street in Northville, Michigan. The plant was built as part of Henry Ford's vision of decentralizing manufacturing and integrating it into rural communities. It was listed on the National Register of Historic Places in 1995.

== Village Industries ==
Northville's Valve Plant was the first of Henry Ford's "Village Industries" factories. The Village industries were designed to bring the economic advantages of industrial jobs to rural communities through the establishment of decentralized, non-disruptive manufacturing plants. In particular, Ford intended the Village Industries to stabilize the income of farmers who would otherwise have little winter income, and he gave his workers leaves of absence to work their farms.

Over the span of the 1920s and 1930s, Ford established over thirty more Village Industries factories, making everything from copper welding rods to lamp assemblies to wheels. The plants tended to be small, employing around 100 workers. As in Northville, all of the factories were built on a riverbank (many at the former site of gristmills), and utilized hydroelectric power.

== History ==
Henry Ford purchased the property this building sits on in 1919. The lot contained an old gristmill which was reconfigured into a valve manufacturing facility by moving machinery in from the Fordson and Highland Park plants. Between 1919 and 1936, the plant manufactured over 180 million valves, at a cost of less than half what it would be in the larger Highland Park plant.

In 1936, Ford replaced the mill with an Albert Kahn-designed factory building. The building reflects the then-current industrial architecture, as well as hints of Art Deco in the brickwork and entryway styling but still incorporated a water wheel.

The Village Industries program was discontinued in 1947, but the factory continued to produce valves. The building was enlarged in 1956, and in 1969 over 150,000 valves were produced every day. The plant continued operations until 1978, the longest lived of any former Village Industries factory, and was later sold. The building has been renovated into office space for use by design firms, such as HKS, Inc., an architecture firm, and Spider9, an environmental technology developer.
