= Fire Station No. 18 =

Fire Station No. 18, and variations such as Engine House No. 18, may refer to:

- Engine House No. 18 (Los Angeles, California)
- Fire Station No. 18 (Denver, Colorado), a Denver Landmark
- Steam Engine Company No. 18, Louisville, Kentucky
- Engine House No. 18 (Detroit), Michigan
- Fire Hall for Engine Company No. 18, Nashville, Tennessee
- Fire Station No. 18 (Seattle, Washington)

== See also ==
- List of fire stations
