= George D. Mason =

American architect (1856–1948)

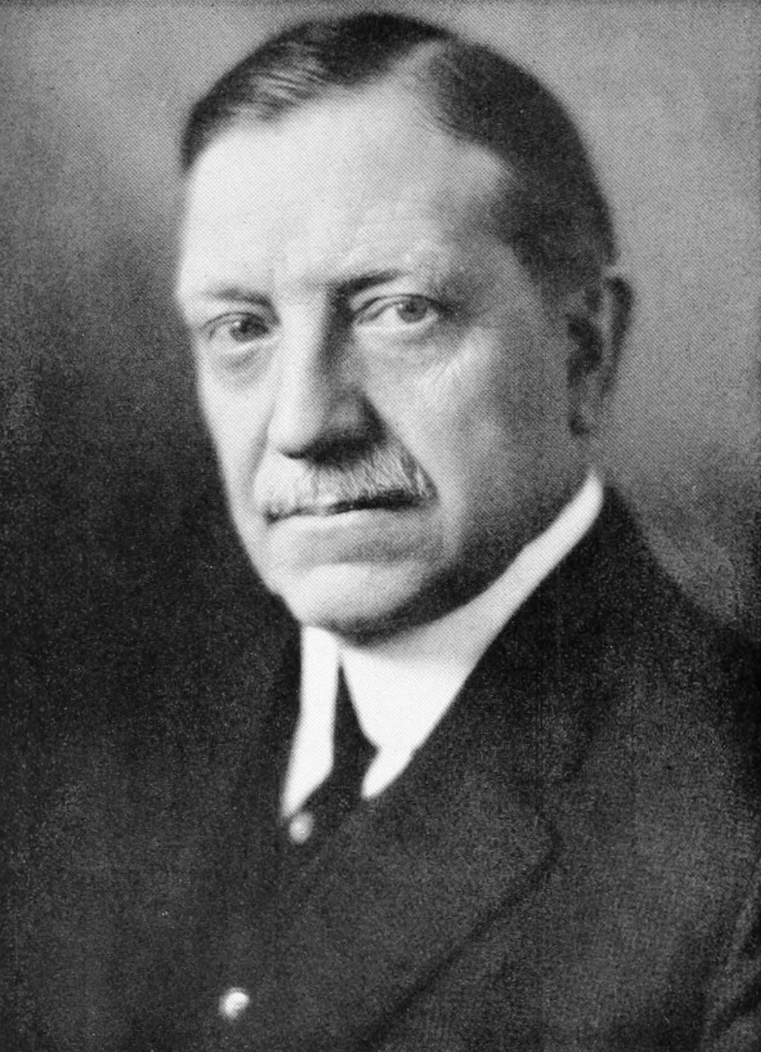
- Mason in 1915
- Born: George DeWitt Mason; July 4, 1856; Syracuse, New York, US
- Died: June 3, 1948 (aged 91); Detroit, Michigan, US
- Occupation: Architect
- Spouse: Ida Whitaker (m. 1882)
- Children: 1

Signature
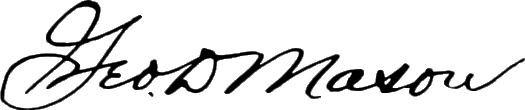

George DeWitt Mason (July 4, 1856 – June 3, 1948) was an American architect who practiced in Detroit. He collaborated with the likes of Henry T. Brush and Albert Kahn.

== Early life ==
Mason was born on July 4, 1856, in Syracuse, New York, the son of James H. and Zelda E. Mason. In 1870, the family moved to Detroit, where Mason received his early education.

== Career ==
Mason began his architectural career working for Detroit architect Hugh Smith in 1875, but this only lasted a summer. Afterward, he moved to the firm of Henry T. Brush, where he worked for the first nine months without pay. Mason started out assigned to some specific detailing work on the George O. Robinson House and the Detroit Public Library. One of the first buildings in which Mason received equal billing for the design was the Ransom Gillis House. In 1878, he joined with Zachariah Rice to form the firm Mason & Rice. This partnership lasted until 1898, after which time Mason continued his practice alone.

Mason married Ida Whitaker in 1882, and they had one daughter. From 1884 until 1896, Albert Kahn worked with Mason & Rice, and he returned to partner with Mason for a few years early in the 20th century. A number of Mason's works, either by himself or as part of Mason & Rice, are listed on the National Register of Historic Places.

Mason died on June 3, 1948, aged 91, in Detroit. He was buried at Evergreen Cemetery in Detroit.

== Selected commissions ==
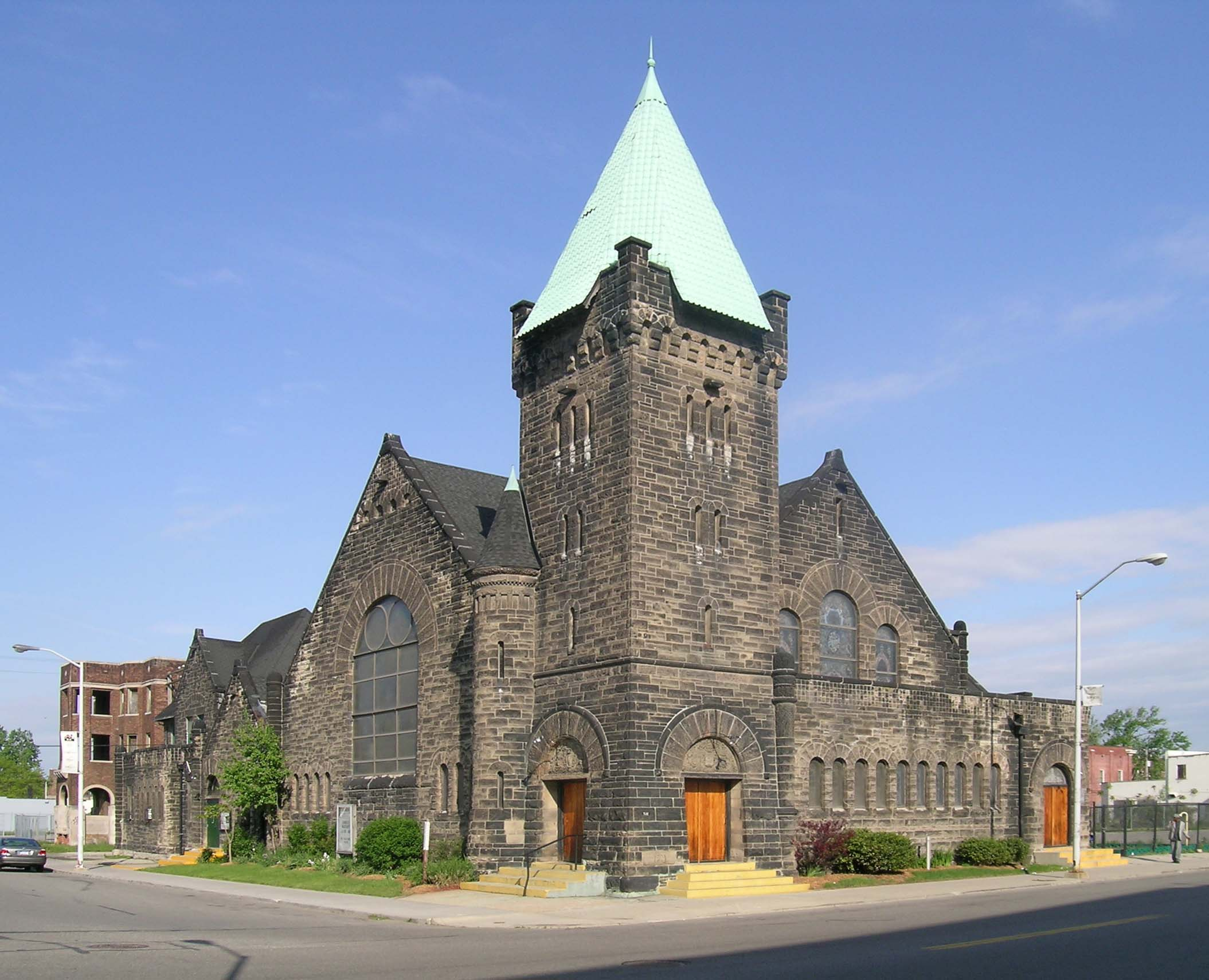
Cass Avenue Methodist Episcopal Church (1883)

- Ransom Gillis House 205 Alfred Street (with Henry T. Brush) (1876 or 1878)
- Michigan Central Railroad Chelsea Depot (with Rice), Chelsea, Michigan (1880)
- Cass Avenue Methodist Episcopal Church (with Rice) (1883) (chapel only; while the building stands, it has been totally refaced) 901 Cass Avenue.
- Marine City City Hall (with Rice) (1884) (300 Broadway Marine City, MI) (Richardson Romanesque)
- Thompson Home (with Rice) 4756 Cass Avenue (1884)
- George and Martha Hitchcock House (with Rice), Farwell, Michigan (1885)
- Grand Hotel (with Rice), Mackinac Island (1887)
- Starkweather Memorial Chapel at Highland Cemetery, Ypsilanti, MIchigan (1888)
- First Presbyterian Church (with Rice) 2930 Woodward Avenue (1889)
- Trinity Episcopal Church (with Rice) 1519 Martin Luther King Boulevard (1890)
- Engine House No. 18 (with Rice) (1892)
- Belle Isle Police Station (with Rice) (1893)
- Franklin H. Walker House (with Rice) 2730 East Jefferson (1896). Demolished in 1990s
- Century Theatre (1903)
- Palms Apartments (with Albert Kahn) (1903)
- Belle Isle Aquarium (with Kahn) (1904)
- Trinity United Methodist Church (1922), 13100 Woodward Avenue, Highland Park, Michigan.
- Detroit Yacht Club (1923) 1 Riverbank Road.
- Detroit Masonic Temple (1926) 500 Temple.
- Gem Theatre (1927) Moved from 62 Columbia to 353 Madison in 1997.
- Central Woodward Christian Church (1928) 9000 Woodward Avenue.
- Detroit College of Law Building (1937) 130 East Elizabeth. Demolished in 1990s

== See also ==
- Architecture of metropolitan Detroit
