= Faith Fowler =

Detroit pastor and nonprofit director

Faith Fowler is an American pastor and community activist. She is the senior pastor of Cass Community United Methodist Church and the executive director of Cass Community Social Services (CCSS), a large nonprofit in Detroit that serves more than 700,000 meals a year and houses about 300 homeless people per night alongside a day program, medical clinics, and a job center. CCSS was established as a nonprofit 501(c)(3) in 2002. Prior to that, many of its programs started as a part of Cass Community United Methodist Church.

Under Fowler's leadership, CCSS has expanded its jobs programs and campus. Her original goal was to expand the social services available in the Cass Corridor beyond emergency-only programs. Fowler's focus on sustainability and jobs has helped address income inequality in Detroit by creating jobs for homeless people and people under the poverty line, through products like mud mats made of repurposed illegally dumped tires, coasters made wood sourced from demolished houses, and Detroit-branded sandals. Her expansion of CCSS's programs and properties has increased the number of homeless people who have successfully moved into transitional housing. Fowler helped create the Tiny Homes Detroit project, Cass Community Publishing House, and Cass Green Industries, which produces the sustainable products sold by CCSS.

Fowler graduated from Albion College and received a Master of Divinity from Boston University School of Theology and a Master of Public Administration from the University of Michigan-Dearborn.

Fowler felt the call to pastorship in junior high, but was told by her church's pastor that she was "wrong". Nonetheless, she studied religion and English at Albion College. To save enough money for a Master of Divinity degree from Boston University, she worked a full-time job at a children's care and rehabilitation facility, and a part-time job at a church youth program.

Fowler has also served as an adjunct professor at University of Michigan-Dearborn, a board member for the Cass Corridor Neighborhood Development Corporation, an advisory board member of the Detroit Area Agency on Aging, and chaired the Detroit Brownfield Redevelopment Authority Advisory Committee. She is the author of two books.

She was inducted into the Michigan Women's Hall of Fame in 2016.

== Tiny Homes Detroit ==
In 2016, Fowler helped create the Tiny Homes Detroit project, a development of small, one- and two-person tiny homes constructed for low-income tenants by Cass Community Social Services. According to CCSS, anyone who completes the homeownership program for seven years will be "given the opportunity to own the home and property."

In early 2023, after winning a two-year legal battle, Fowler drew criticisms from local activists for legally evicting a woman from one of the tiny homes. According to court records, the 44-year-old tenant has been taken to court at least nine times by different landlords in two counties for numerous tenant violations, including unpaid rent. On April 4, 2023, bailiffs were sent to the home to evict the resident but were met by activists illegally blocking the door.

The first Tiny Homes Detroit residents are on pace to own their homes in 2024.

According to a social media post by the agency on December 26, 2025, and the agency website, the Tiny Homes Detroit community currently has three homeowners, with two additional residents "slated to receive their deeds in 2026."
