= Chelsea station (Michigan) =

Railroad depot in Michigan, US

Chelsea, MI
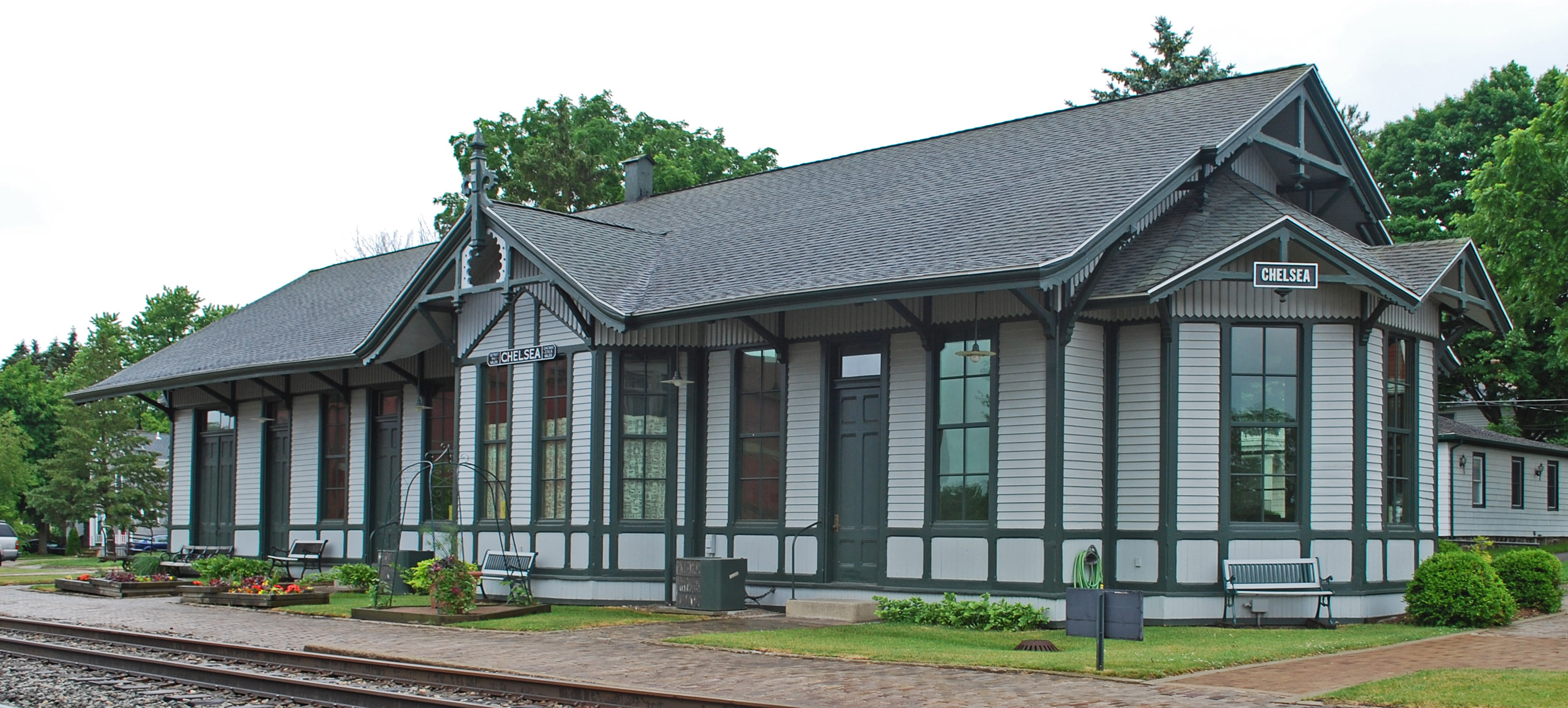

General information
- Location: 150 Jackson Street, Chelsea, Michigan 48118

History
- Opened: 1880
- Closed: 1981

Former services
Preceding station	Amtrak	Following station
Jackson Terminus	Michigan Executive	Ann Arbor toward Detroit (Michigan Central)
Preceding station	New York Central Railroad	Following station
Grass Lake toward Chicago	Michigan Central Railroad Main Line	Dexter toward Buffalo
- Michigan Central Railroad Chelsea Depot
- U.S. National Register of Historic Places
- Michigan State Historic Site
- Location within Michigan Location within the United States
- Location: 125 Jackson St., Chelsea, Michigan
- Coordinates: 42°19′9″N 84°1′11″W
- Area: 0.8 acres (0.32 ha)
- Built: 1880
- Built by: Adams & Rogers
- Architect: Mason and Rice
- Architectural style: Stick style Victorian architecture
- NRHP reference No.: 87000915

Significant dates
- Added to NRHP: June 12, 1987
- Designated MSHS: December 5, 1986
Location

Chelsea railroad station is a disused railroad depot located at 125 Jackson Street in Chelsea, Michigan. It was designated a Michigan State Historic Site in 1986 and listed on the National Register of Historic Places in 2010 as Michigan Central Railroad Chelsea Depot. The depot is the only known Michigan example designed by the well known Detroit architectural firm of Mason and Rice.

== History ==
The land where the Chelsea Depot now sits was first settled in the 1830s by brothers Elisha and James Congdon. In 1848, the Congdons offered the Michigan Central Railroad a plot of land along the rail line on which to build a station. The railroad accepted, and the first structure built at the site was a freight station, completed in 1850. A series of freight stations followed, and the resulting freight business through the town spurred the growth of Chelsea in the mid-1800s. However, in 1875, the last of these depots – a rather shabby shed – was destroyed under suspicious circumstances, and the railroad was slow to rebuild it.

In 1880, the railroad decided to establish passenger service in Chelsea, and chose the site for an experiment in improving the appearance and design of their rural stations. The railroad hired Detroit architects Mason and Rice to design the new station. It was built and commissioned in 1880, and served as a Michigan Central Railroad passenger station until 1975, when the company went out of business. Amtrak took over the line, and continued service until 1981, when the station was closed. For the next few years, the station was used for storage.

In 1985, a group of Chelsea citizens formed the Chelsea Depot Association and, with the financial assistance of local businesses, purchased the depot to prevent the deterioration of the structure. They began restoration efforts in 1986, and the depot was listed on the National Register of Historic Places in 1987. The building has since been used as a rental space for community and private functions, and the Chelsea Depot Association continues to maintain it. In 2011, the exterior was repainted and new windows were installed.

== Description ==
Mason and Rice's design for the Michigan Central Railroad Chelsea Depot is a Stick style Late Victorian design, with multiple gables and gingerbread decoration. It is a one-story rectangular frame structure measuring 100 feet (30 m) by 35 feet (11 m), with widely overhanging eaves. A hip roof triple bay at each end delineates the two interior waiting rooms - one for women and one for men. Most of the structure is covered with horizontal clapboard, but the gable ends are covered with vertical board and batten. A brick patio surrounds the building. With the exception of some changes to the chimney structure and missing roof crests and finial, the depot's exterior looks exactly like it did when constructed.
