= Hunter House (Detroit) =

Historic house in Michigan, United States

- U.S. National Register of Historic Places
- Michigan State Historic Site
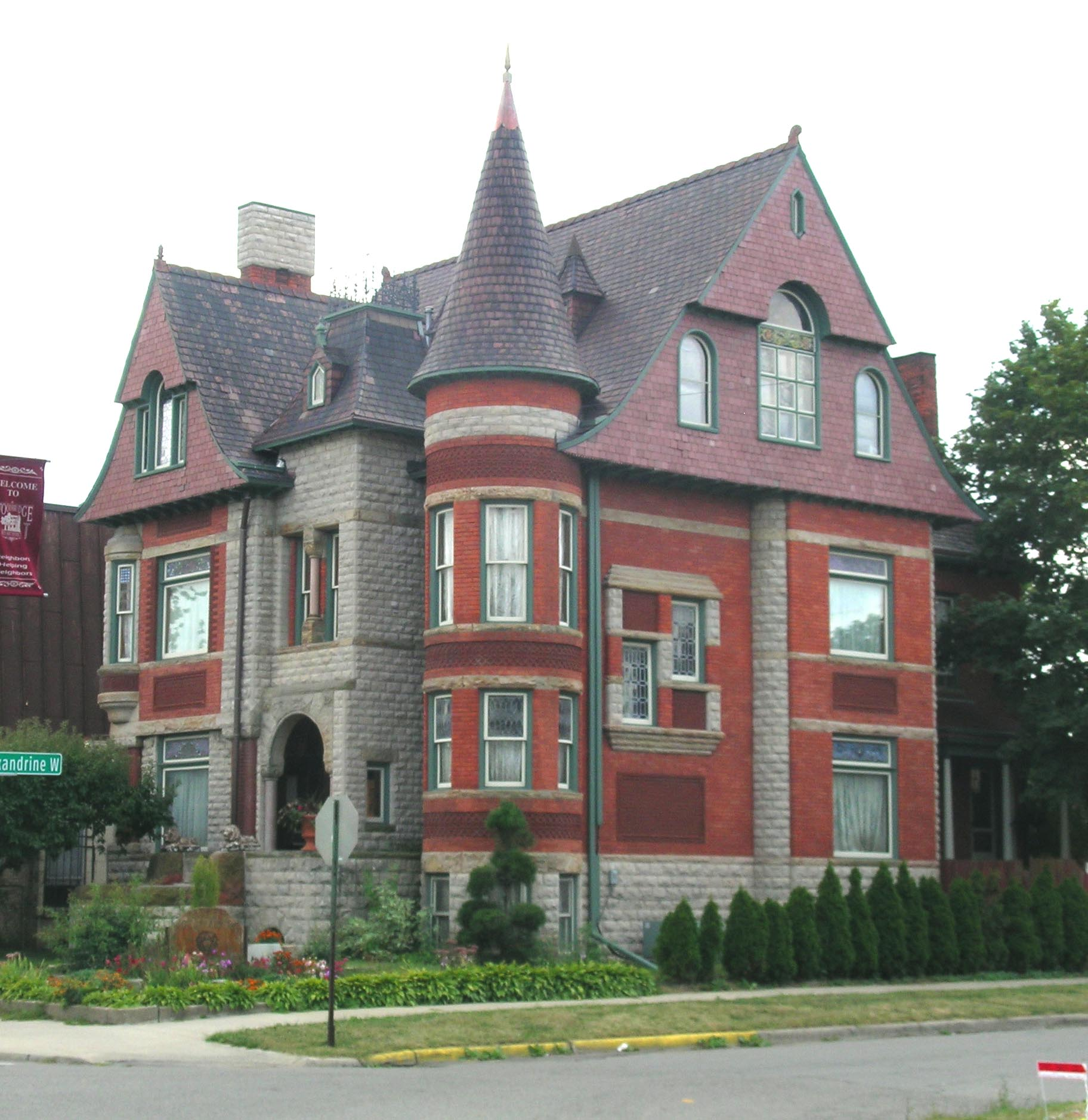
- Interactive map
- Location: 3985 Trumbull Avenue; Detroit, Michigan
- Coordinates: 42°20′43.55″N 83°4′30.44″W
- Built: 1891
- Architect: George F. Depew
- Architectural style: Châteauesque, Queen Anne, Second Empire
- NRHP reference No.: 74001002

Significant dates
- Added to NRHP: December 31, 1974
- Designated MSHS: July 26, 1974

The Hunter House (also known as the William Northwood House or the Northwood–Hunter House) is located at 3985 Trumbull Avenue in the Woodbridge Neighborhood Historic District of Detroit, Michigan. The house was listed on the National Register of Historic Places and designated a Michigan State Historic Site in 1974. It was previously operated as the Woodbridge Star, a bed and breakfast.

== History ==
In 1890, William Northwood, the co-founder of the Howard–Northwood Malt Manufacturing Company, commissioned architect George F. Depew to design this home. The structure was completed in 1891 at a cost of $13,500. In 1903, James J. Sullivan, founder of Sullivan Beef, purchased the home. The family lived in the house until 1957. Both Howard–Northwood Malt Manufacturing and Sullivan Beef were major commercial ventures in Detroit, and this home reflects the prosperity of the owners. In the 1960s, the house was converted into a church, and in 1966, a side porch and conservatory were demolished. In the early 1970s, the home was purchased by the Hunter family, who converted it back to a private residence. The structure was added to the National Register of Historic Places in 1974. The house was sold at a later date in 2009 to an unknown buyer.

The home was recently operated as the Woodbridge Star, a seven-room bed and breakfast. Very few exterior alterations have been made to the home, and the interior remains highly original.

== Architecture ==
George F. Depew designed the elaborate three-story house in French Renaissance Châteauesque style with a red brick and rusticated stone exterior. The influences of Queen Anne and Second Empire styles can also be seen on the home. Round and square towers project from the main section of the house, each with a different roof style. The house has 6,500 sq ft (600 m^{2}). The sides of the house differ in their appearance. Incised brick and colored sandstone add ornamentation to the façade. The roof has red slate shingles with metal cresting; shingle-covered gables facing the front of the home extend from the roof. The transom windows are filled with stained and leaded glass, and the house boasts polished jasper collonettes.
