= Woodbridge, Detroit =

- Woodbridge Neighborhood Historic District
- U.S. National Register of Historic Places
- U.S. Historic district
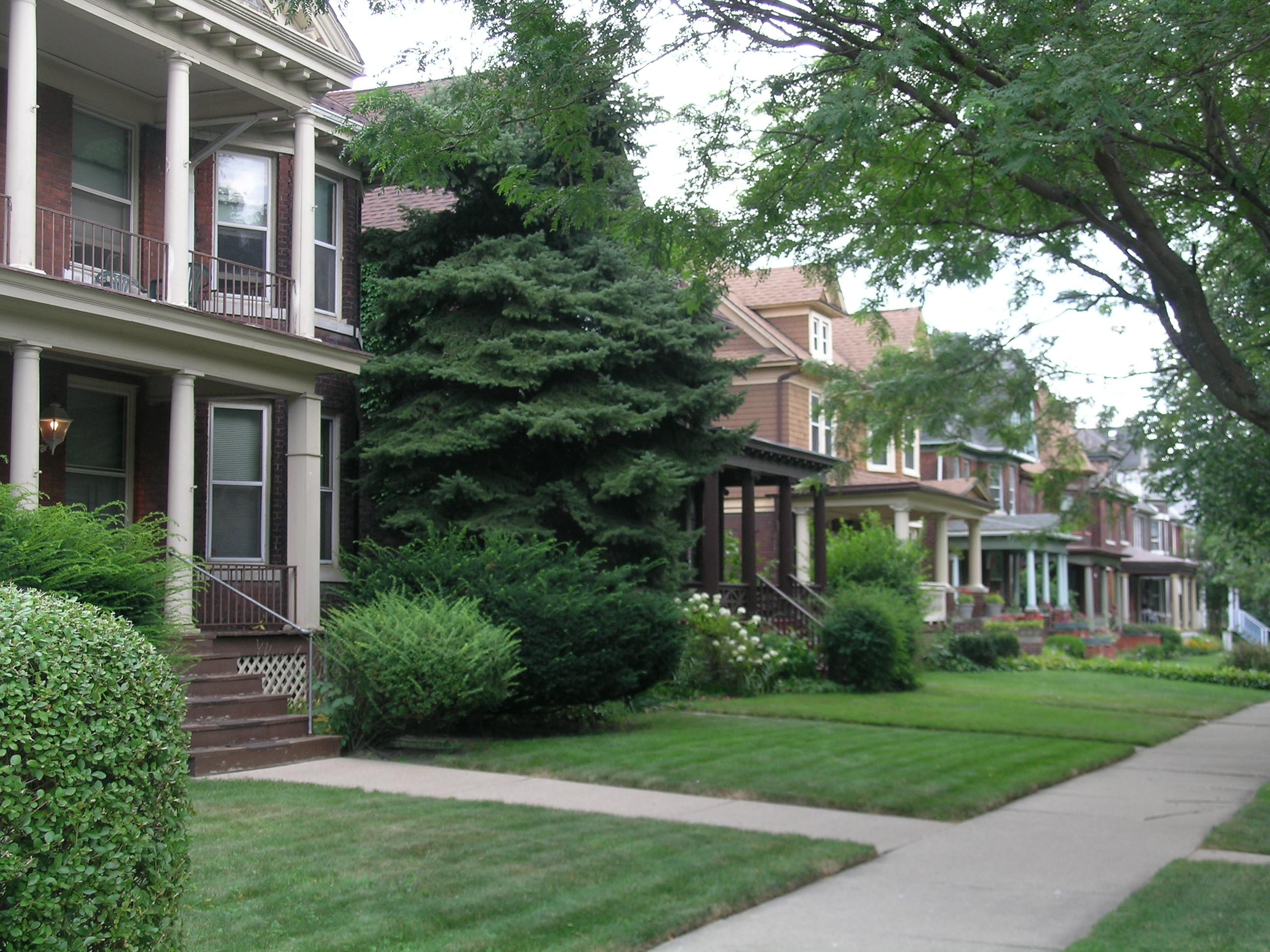
- Street scene on Avery, looking south from Willis

- Location within Michigan
- Interactive map
- Location: Detroit, Michigan, U.S.
- Coordinates: 42°20′50″N 83°4′42″W
- Architectural style: Second Empire, Queen Anne, Romanesque
- NRHP reference No.: 80001931, 97001480 (boundary increase I), 08000225 (boundary increase II)
- Added to NRHP: March 6, 1980, December 1, 1997 (boundary increase I), March 20, 2008 (boundary increase II)

Woodbridge is a historic neighborhood of primarily Victorian homes located in Detroit, Michigan. The district was listed on the National Register of Historic Places in 1980, with later boundary increases in 1997 and 2008. In addition to its historic value, Woodbridge is also notable for being an intact neighborhood of turn-of-the-century homes within walking or biking distance of Detroit's Downtown, Midtown, New Center, and Corktown neighborhoods.

== Description ==
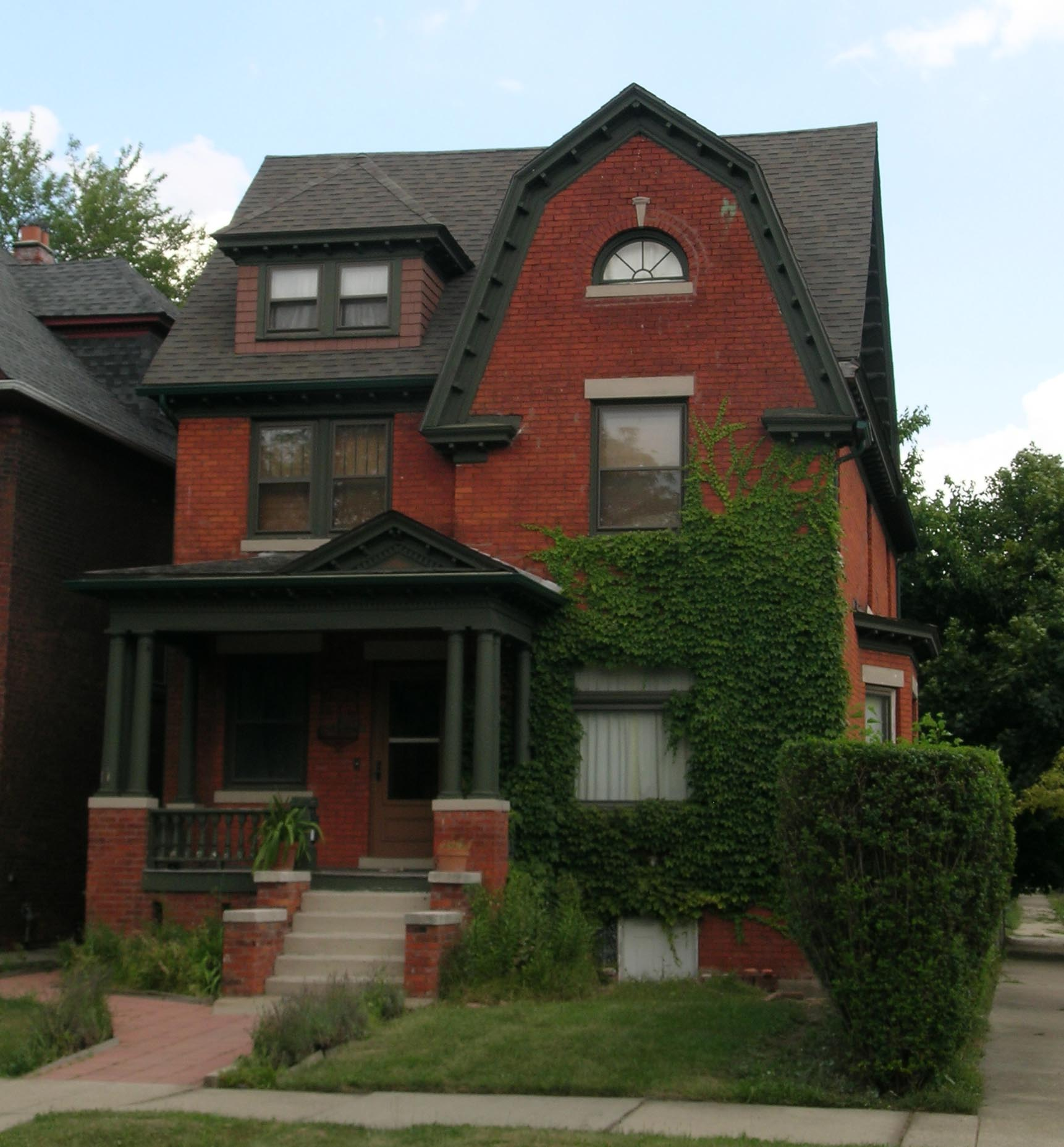
House on Avery

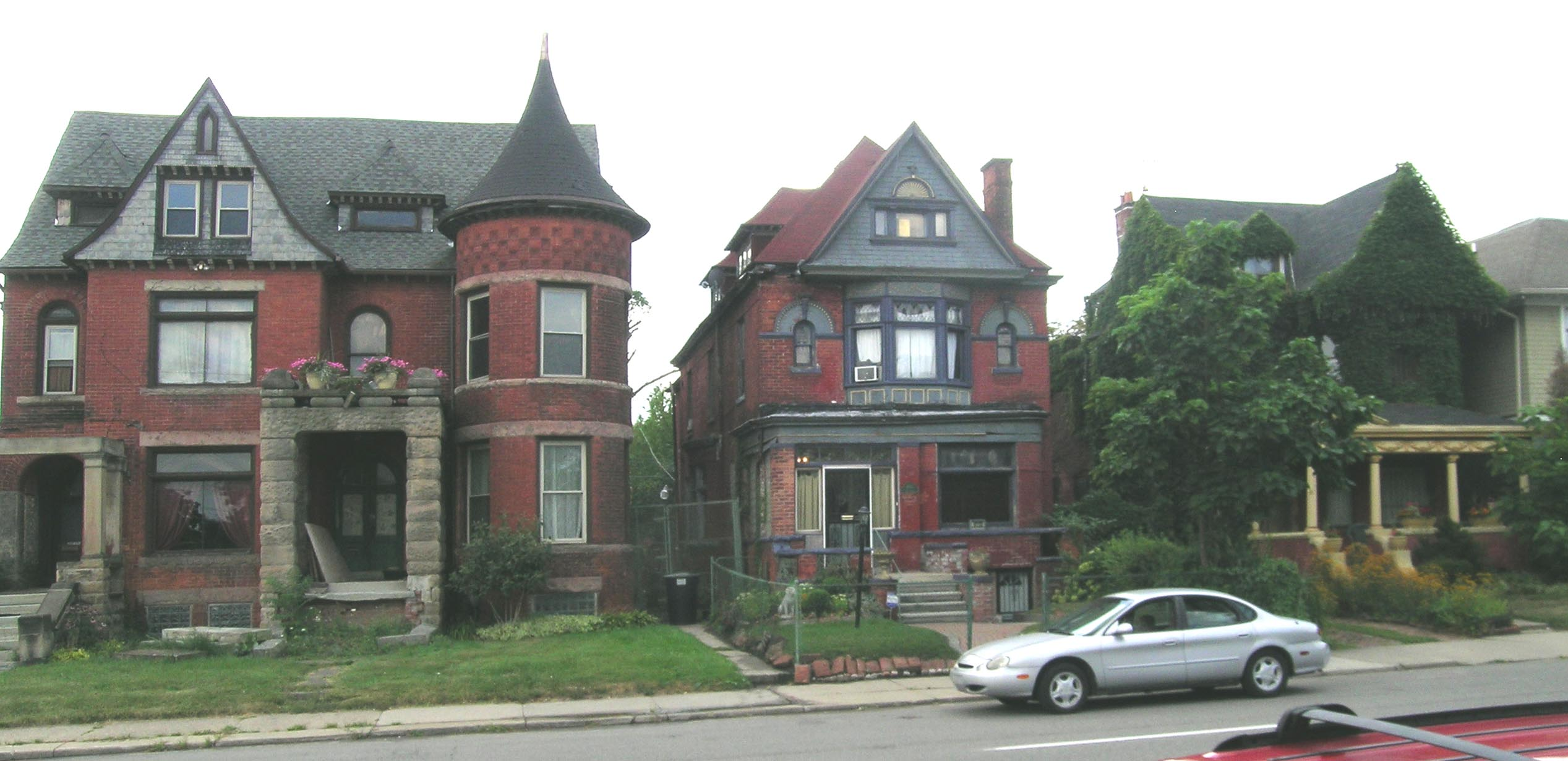
West side of Trumbull between Willis and Alexandrine

The district as recognized by the National Register of Historic Places was originally bounded by Trumbull Street, Calumet Street, Gibson Street, Grand River Avenue, Rosa Parks Boulevard, West Warren Avenue, Wabash Street, Railroad Tracks, and the Edsel Ford Freeway. The boundaries of the District were increased twice: in 1997, 4304-14 Trumbull Street (private residences) and 3800 Grand River Avenue were added to the district, and in 2008 the southeast corner of Trumbull Street and Warren Avenue (Saint Dominic Roman Catholic Church) was added.

Most structures in the district are located on north–south streets. The irregularly-shaped district includes structure at 3800 Grand River Avenue (between Avery Street and Commonwealth Street), and structures within the following boundaries:

- on the east side of Wabash street, on both sides of Vermont Street, and on both sides of Rosa Parks Boulevard from the Edsel Ford Freeway to Warren Avenue;
- on the west side of Rosa Parks Boulevard from Warren Avenue to Grand River Avenue;
- on both sides of Hecla Street, Avery Street, and Commonwealth Street from the Edsel Ford Freeway to Grand River Avenue;
- on the west side of Trumbull Street from the Edsel Ford Freeway to Canfield Street;
- on the east side of Trumbull Street at the south corner of Warren Avenue;
- on both sides of Trumbull Street from Canfield Street to Grand River Avenue; and
- on both sides of Lincoln Street and the west side of Gibson Street from Calumet Street to Grand River Avenue.

== History ==
Woodbridge is an intact neighborhood of architecturally significant buildings and has had an important effect on the history of Detroit. The neighborhood, dating to the Victorian era, has largely escaped the redevelopment efforts that have obliterated many of Detroit's other historic areas. It is named for William Woodbridge, governor of Michigan in 1840–1841, who owned a large farm on which much of the neighborhood was subsequently built.

Most of the structures within the neighborhood were built after 1870, beginning with modest cottages. Larger structures were built later, including the James Scripps house (now demolished and turned into a city park), built in 1879. The Eighth Precinct Police Station, built in 1901, was architecturally designed to blend in with the lavish upper-class homes in the neighborhood. As the automotive industry boomed, there was an increased demand for housing in the city of Detroit, and new buildings and apartment houses were constructed behind and between the existing homes in the neighborhood. During World War II, owners rented rooms and divided homes into apartments to house defense industry workers.

After the war, residents began leaving the Woodbridge neighborhood for the suburbs. New residents to Woodbridge were less affluent. In the 1960s, the city cleared areas adjacent to the neighborhood to support revitalization. The residents of Woodbridge organized a Citizen's District Council to preserve the neighborhood, and successfully managed to stabilize and preserve many of the remaining homes. Recent activity has shifted perception of Woodbridge from that of an up-and-coming neighborhood to a hotbed of urban revitalization, with the few properties that come up for sale typically subject to bidding wars.

== Notable structures ==
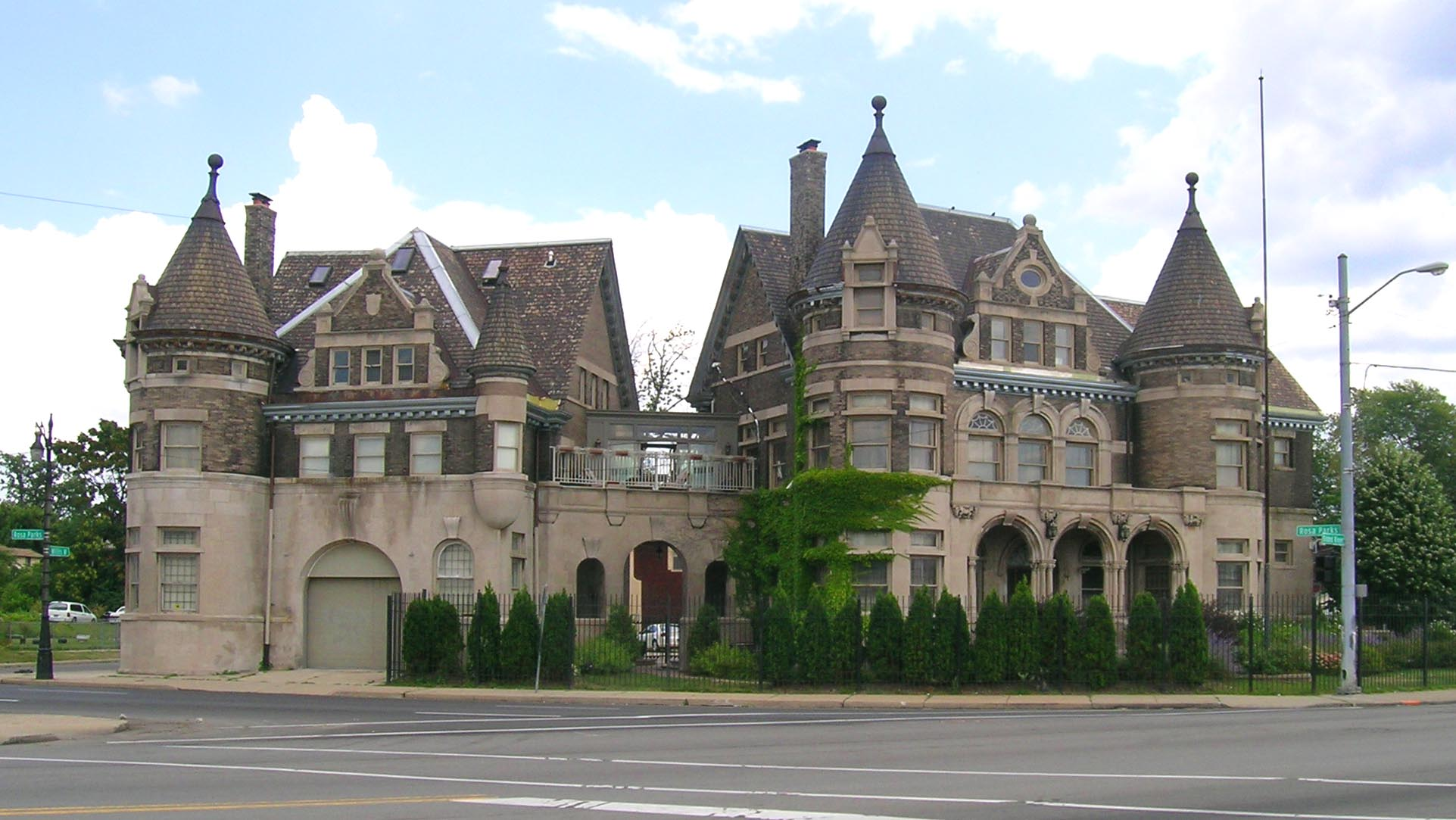
The former Eighth Precinct Police Station was redeveloped into lofts in 2013

Notable structures within the Woodbridge neighborhood include:

- The Eighth Precinct Police Station is located at 4150 Grand River Avenue, and was designated a Michigan State Historic Site in 1973 and listed on the National Register of Historic Places in 1974. In 2013, the building was converted to lofts, as part of the ongoing revitalization of Woodbridge.

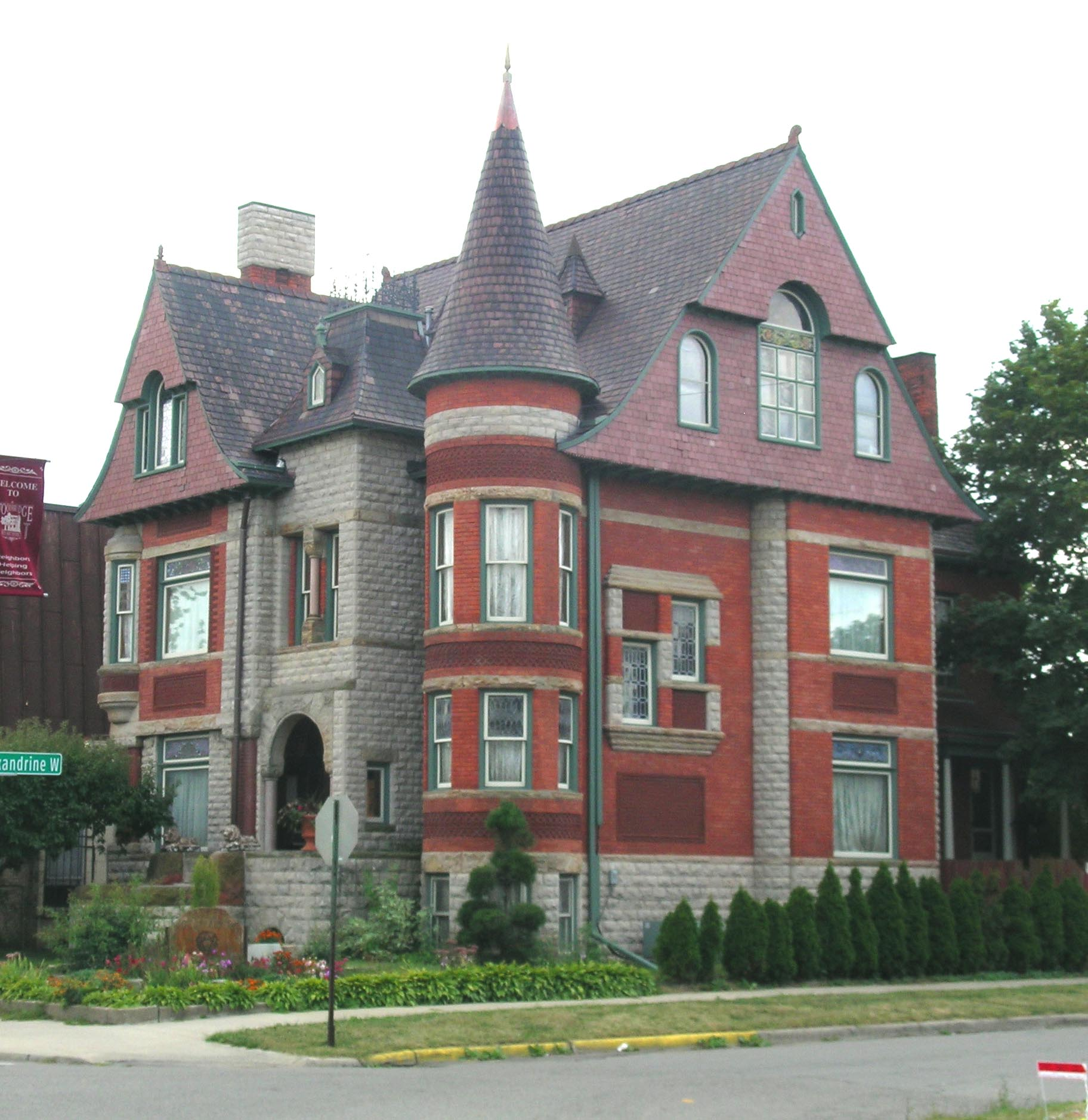
The Hunter House

- The Northwood–Hunter House (also known as the William Northwood House) is located at 3985 Trumbull Avenue. The house was listed on the National Register of Historic Places and designated a Michigan State Historic Site in 1974.

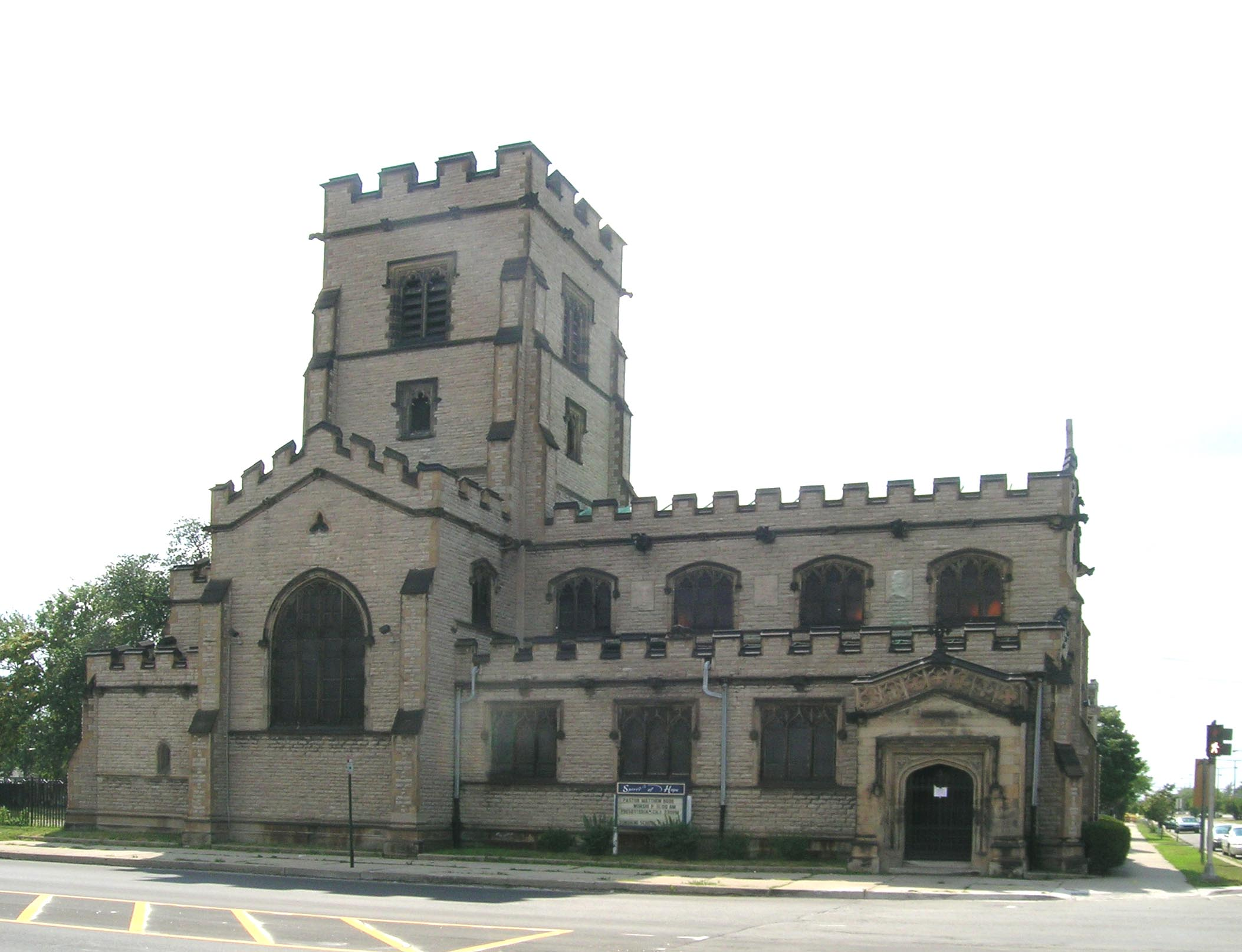
Trinity Episcopal Church

- Presently known as Spirit of Hope church, the Trinity Episcopal Church is located at 1519 Martin Luther King Boulevard. The church was designated a Michigan State Historic Site in 1979 and listed on the National Register of Historic Places in 1980.
- The Trumbullplex is a renowned housing collective and showspace that has become an institution and hotbed of creative anarchism, which was created in 1993 when members of the collective established a nonprofit corporation and purchased the property, two Victorian houses on either side of a single-story art space.
- The Trumbull Avenue Presbyterian Church is located at 1435 Brainard at the intersection of Brainard and Trumbull near Scripps Park. It was listed on the State of Michigan Registry of Historic Sites on June 6, 1977.
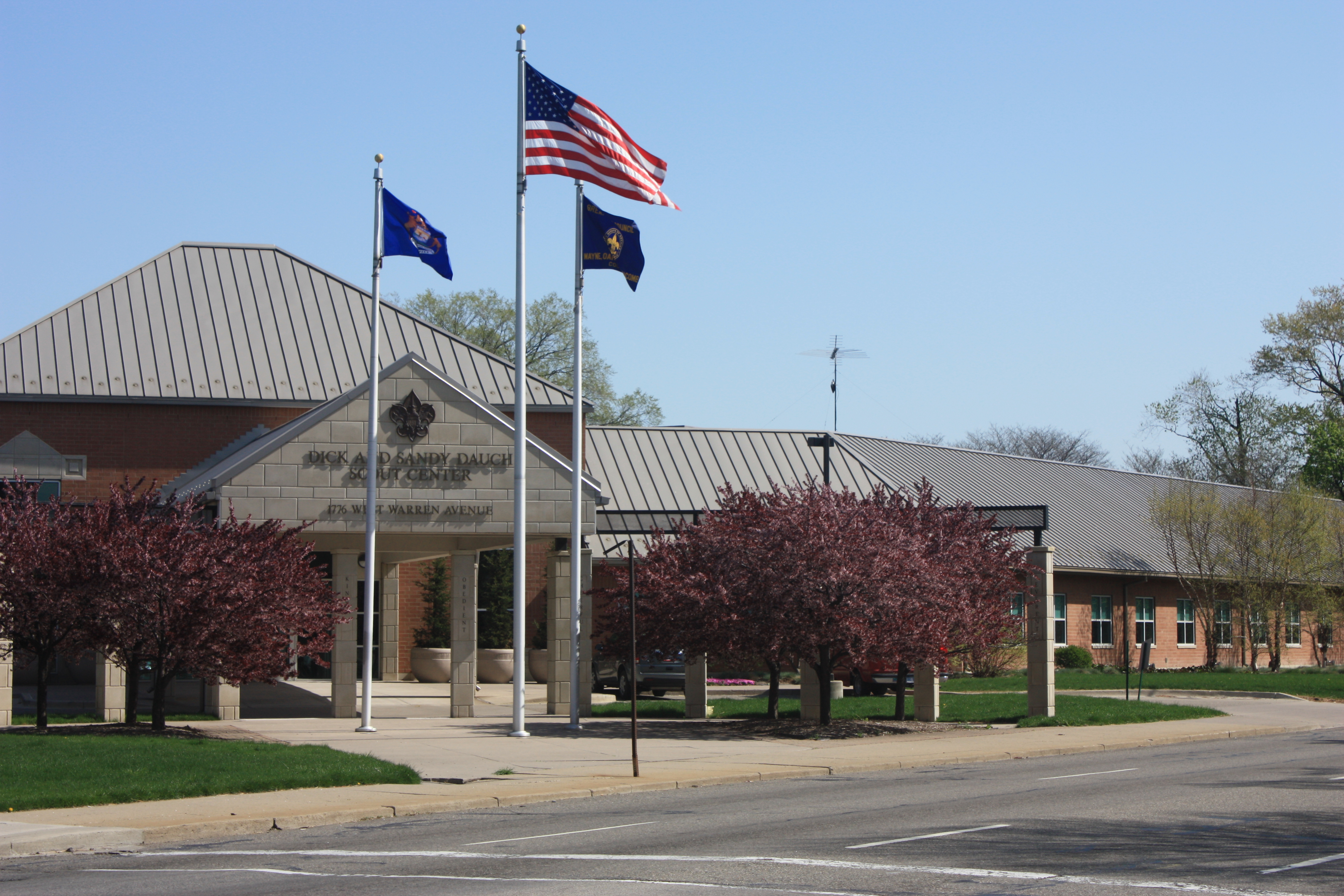
  Dick and Sandy Dauch Scout Center, headquarters of the Great Lakes Council, Boy Scouts of America
- The Detroit Area Council—later becoming the Great Lakes Council for the Boy Scouts of America that serves the Detroit metropolitan area and covers all of Wayne, Oakland and Macomb counties—chose to build its headquarters in Woodbridge. The facility holds both council and district staff, as well as the National Toyota Scout Shop. Dedicated in September 2003, the service center was largely paid for by the donations of the Dauches; Council Treasurer Irving Rose and his wife, Audrey; and Council Vice President Richard Marsh. The building cost nearly $6 million, including new furnishings, landscaping, and demolition of the old building

== Education ==
Detroit Public Schools operates public schools. Frederick Douglass Academy for Young Men is located in Woodbridge.

== Notable people ==
- Kenneth Cockrel Jr., former Detroit City Council member and president, as well as former mayor of Detroit
- Tony Hawk, professional skateboarder, video game subject, and real estate entrepreneur who maintains a second home in the neighborhood
- Rose Mary Robinson, Michigan State Representative, former member of the Detroit Charter Revision Commission (in 2009) and former Wayne County Commissioner (one of the first women ever elected, in 1970)
- Sixto Rodriguez ("Rodriguez"), folk musician and subject of Academy Award-winning movie Searching for Sugar Man
- Gary Schwartz, Academy Award–nominated filmmaker, animator, artist and educator

Previous residents included:

- George Gough Booth, publisher of the privately held Evening News Association, co-founder of Booth Newspapers, co-founder of the Cranbrook Educational Community, major benefactor of The Detroit Institute of Arts, and son-in-law of James E. Scripps
- Ty Cobb, Detroit Tigers outfielder and Major League Baseball hall-of-famer
- Ken and Ann Mikolowski, Cass Corridor artists and cofounders of The Alternative Press
- James E. Scripps, founder of The Evening News (now The Detroit News) and early benefactor of the Detroit Museum of Art (now The Detroit Institute of Arts), to which he gave one of the first major accessions of early paintings for any American museum. Scripps is the namesake for Scripps Park, a public park in the southern part of the neighborhood.
- David Stott, early Detroit millionaire, "Detroit's Flour King," commemorated in the David Stott Building
- William Woodbridge, second Governor of Michigan and United States Senator
