= Trumbullplex =

Housing collective in Detroit, Michigan, US

Coordinates: 42.346891°N 83.075333°W

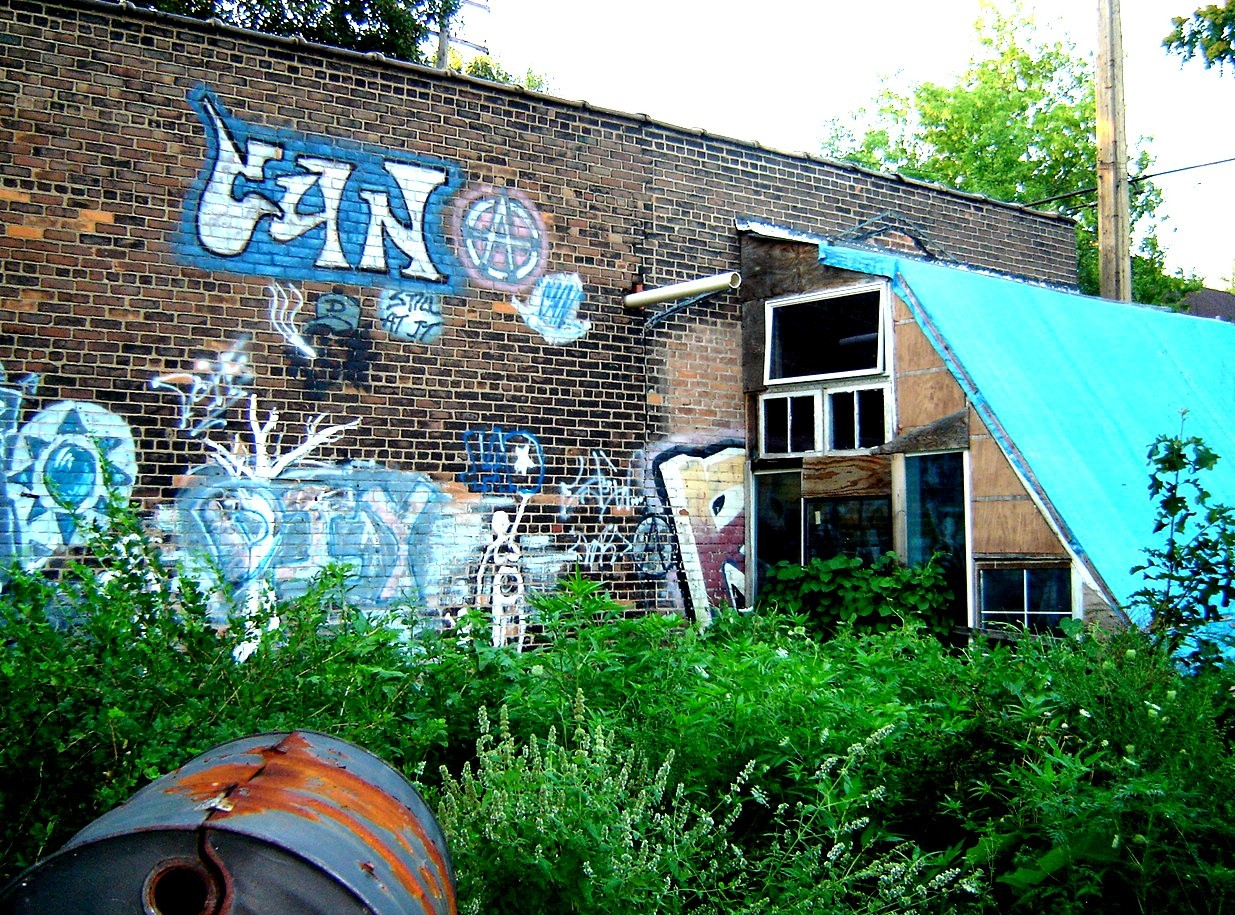
Trumbullplex exterior, Summer 2006

The Trumbullplex is a housing collective and showspace in the Woodbridge neighborhood of Detroit, Michigan, USA.

== Beginnings ==
Trumbullplex was created in 1993, when members of the collective known formally as the Wayne Association of Collective Housing established a nonprofit corporation and purchased the property: two Victorian houses and a single-story art space in-between. The two houses are occupied by a fluctuating group of resident collective members, as well as like-minded short-term traveling artists, musicians, and activists. The resident collective members, along with other committed community members, work together to maintain the show space and provide accessible, meaningful community experiences to locals and travelers alike. The Trumbullplex has since grown to also include three adjacent, undeveloped side-lot properties, following a well-publicized bidding war with a local developer in 2016. These side-lots function as community greenspace for potlucks, herb walks, and arts based events. They were bought from the city for $10,000.

== Collective ==
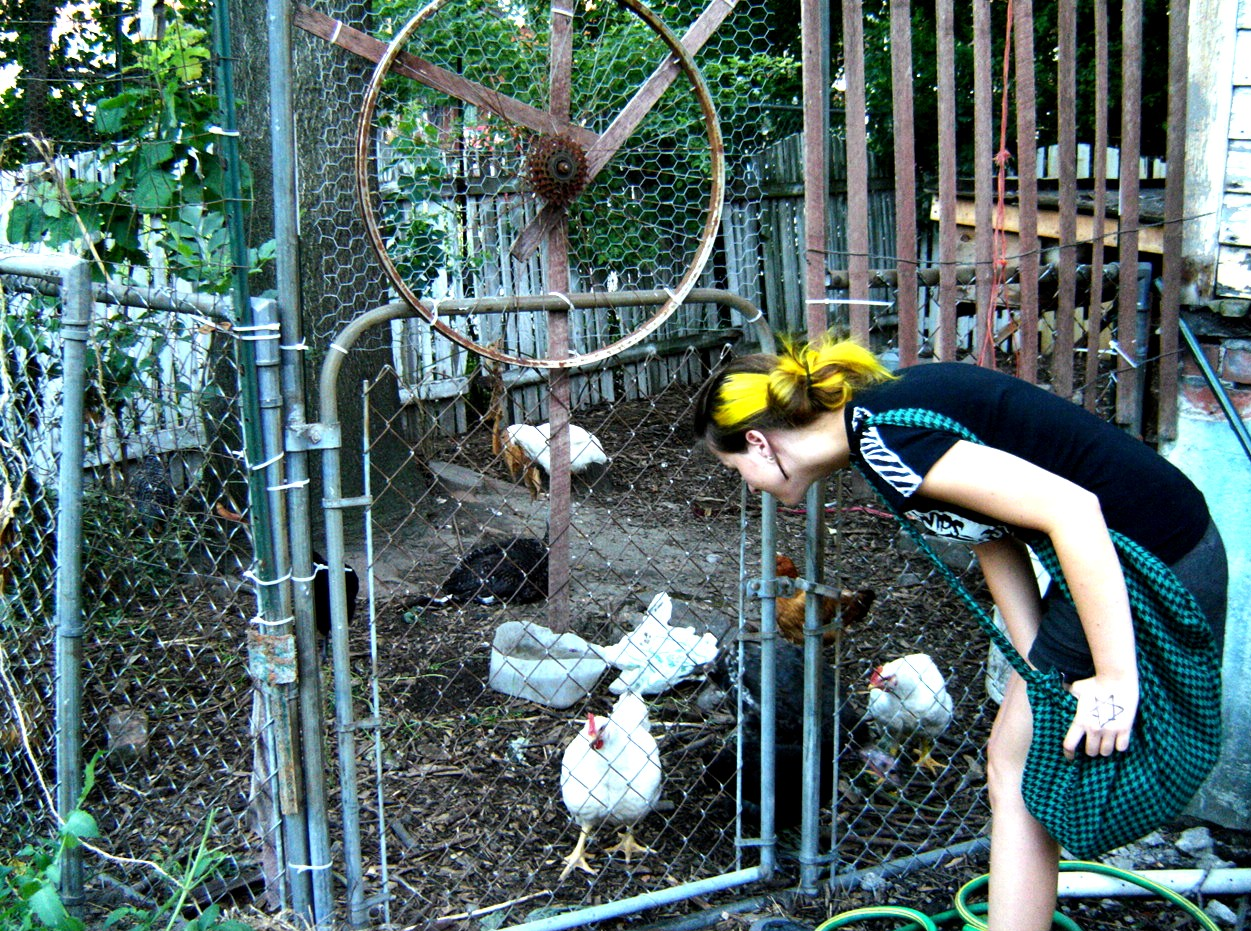
Chicken coop of Trumbullplex in 2006

The collective's mission statement asserts that they “want to create a positive environment for revolutionary change in which economic and social relationships are based on mutual aid and the absence of hierarchy.” It acts on the basis of consensus decision-making and serves as a home, theater, art gallery, infoshop, meeting space and temporary residence for traveling activists. The art space is run on a donations-only basis, and members pay an equal portion of the costs involved in the property's upkeep each month.

The Trumbullplex collective is engaged in homeless support, LGBTQ activism and Food Not Bombs. Members of the collective and surrounding community run the operations within the theater and meeting space and also participate in alternative schools, such as the high school for teenage mothers, the Catherine Ferguson Academy and CFA farm, the Hub of Detroit (a cycling non-profit located in the city's Cass Corridor), to Detroit organizations promoting urban agriculture such as Earthworks, and to a variety of other causes and organizations.

== Zine library ==
In 2011, the Trumbullplex completed the addition of a free zine library located within the showspace, which houses over 2,000 independently published books, pamphlets, and fanzines. Many of these publications were donated to the Trumbullplex following the closing of the now defunct Idle Kids infoshop in Detroit's Cass Corridor. In addition to providing access to the zine library during events in the showspace as well as during regularly scheduled open hours, the Trumbullplex zine library has also provided pop-up versions of the collection at such local events as the Allied Media Conference and the Dally in the Alley festival.

== 25th birthday ==
In August 2018, the Trumbullplex celebrated being 25 years old with a two-day party.
