= Trinity Episcopal Church (Detroit) =

Historic church in Michigan, United States

- U.S. National Register of Historic Places
- Michigan State Historic Site
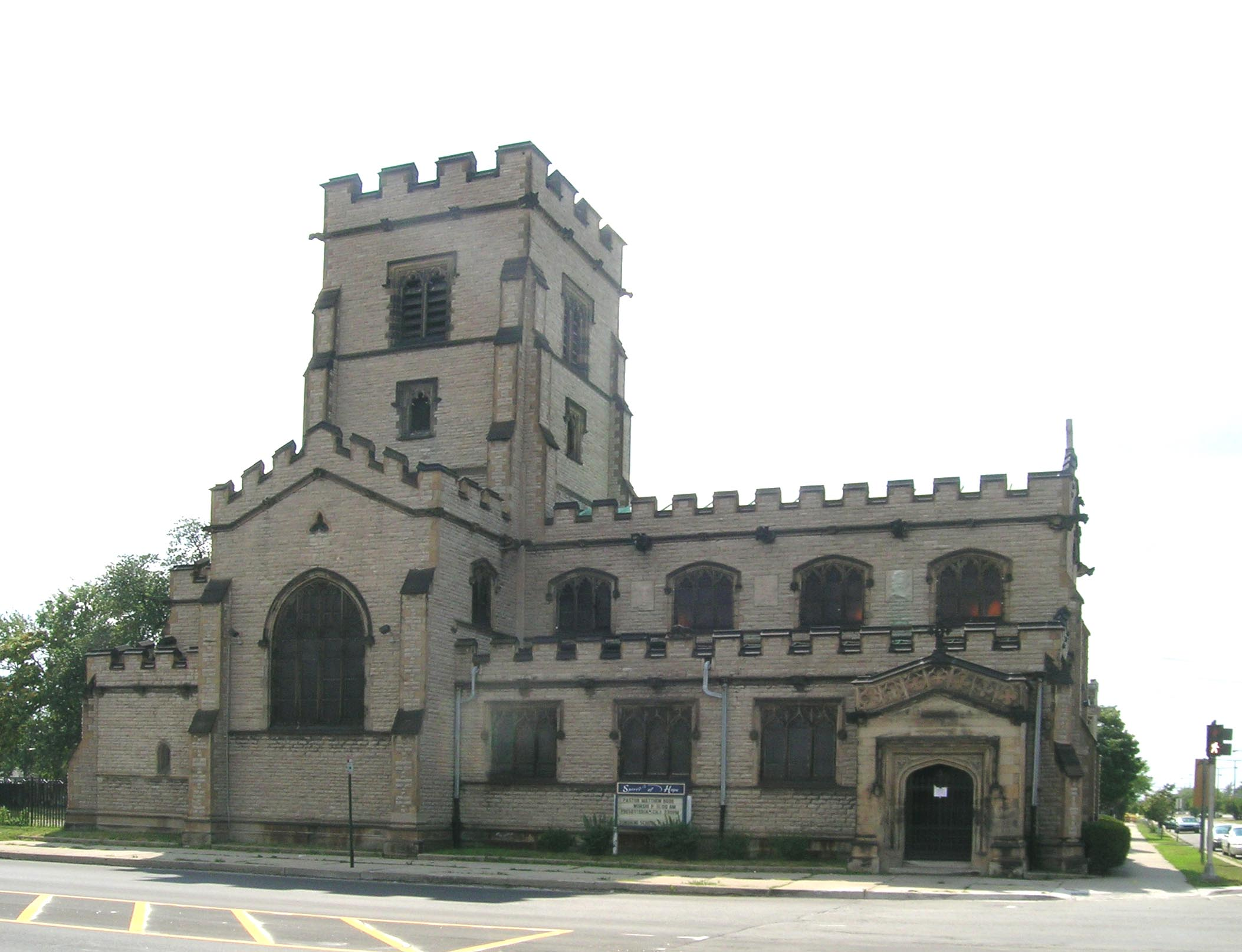
- Interactive map
- Location: 1519 Martin Luther King Boulevard; Detroit, Michigan
- Coordinates: 42°20′29″N 83°4′22″W
- Built: 1890
- Architect: George D. Mason & Zachariah Rice
- Architectural style: Norman Revival
- NRHP reference No.: 80001929

Significant dates
- Added to NRHP: May 22, 1980
- Designated MSHS: August 3, 1979

Trinity Episcopal Church is located at 1519 Martin Luther King Boulevard in the Woodbridge Historic District of Detroit, Michigan. The church was designated a Michigan State Historic Site in 1979 and listed on the National Register of Historic Places in 1980. It is now known as Spirit of Hope.

== History ==
The Epiphany Reformed Episcopal parish was founded in 1878 as a place where Anglicans not pledged to the Episcopal bishop of Michigan might worship. In 1880, the congregation built a small frame church, and in 1889 changed their name to Trinity Episcopal.

James E. Scripps, owner of The Detroit News, was a member of the Trinity congregation. Scripps was born in London, and developed a fascination with historic English churches. He commissioned sketches of churches in England, and in 1893 put up $55,000 to build the current church building.

In 1896, Trinity members voted to unite their church with the Episcopal diocese of Michigan. In 1926, the parish house, which includes a chapel, dining room, gymnasium, offices and classrooms was constructed. As the neighborhood around Trinity changed, the church reached out to new constituents, including the Irish community. However, the declining population of the surrounding area led to a decline in the congregation.

In 2001, the nearby Jeffries Housing Projects were torn down; the Faith Memorial Lutheran Church, founded in 1956 to serve the community, found itself with a drastically reduced congregation. The congregations of Faith Memorial Lutheran and Trinity Episcopal began exploring the concept of merging, and in April 2006, the two joined to become the Spirit of Hope.

In 2007, Kathleen Devlin (Tuka) began the Spirit of Hope Urban Farm which was featured in the September/October 2011 Natural Home & Garden magazine.

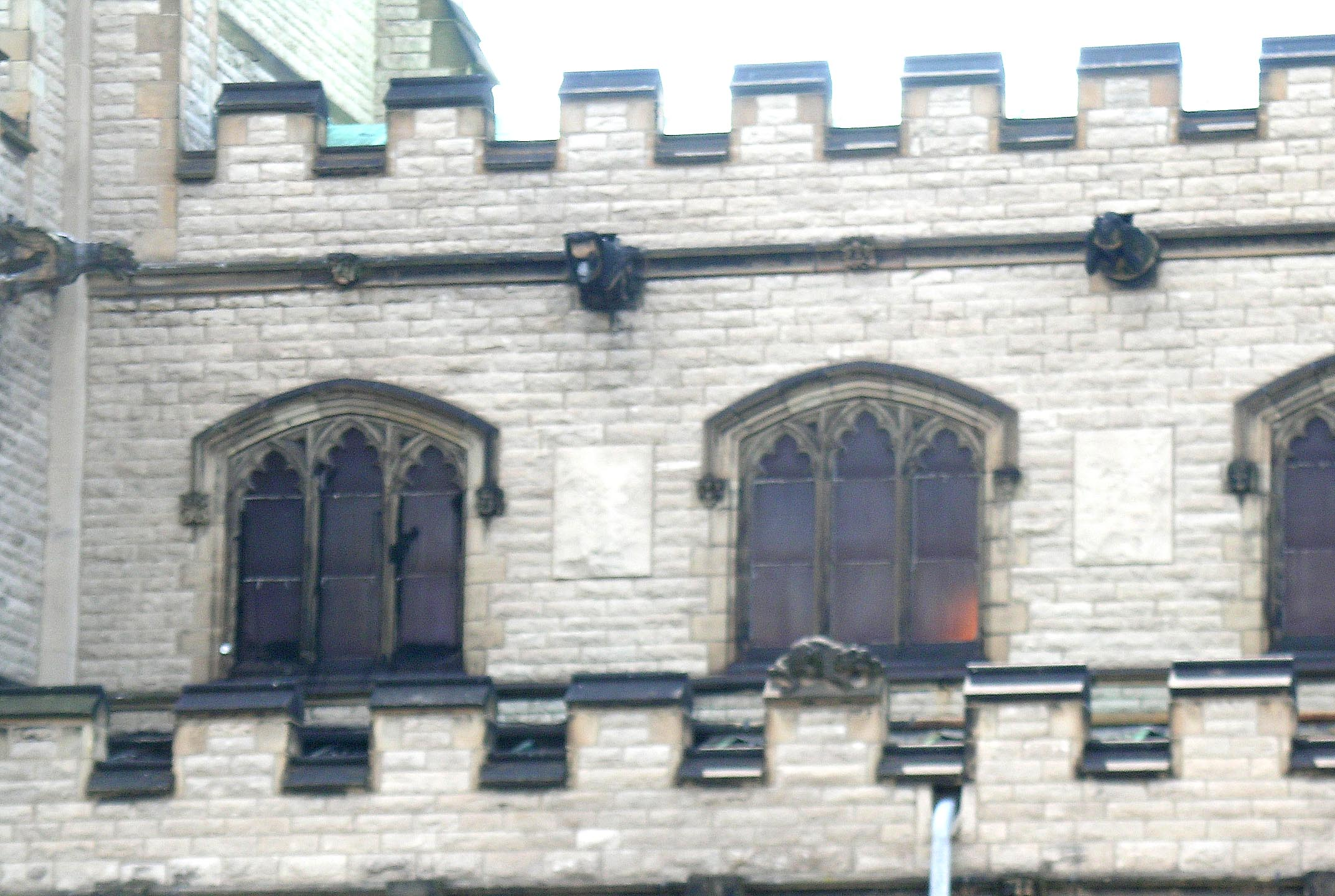
Detail of the exterior

== Architecture ==
James E. Scripps commissioned architects Mason & Rice to design this English Gothic-style church. The floorplan of Trinity Episcopal Church is laid out in a cruciform pattern. The walls are two feet thick Trenton limestone, and the roof is sheathed with copper. Smooth brown limestone used as trim offsets the white limestone used for the bulk of the walls. The 85-foot-tall (26 m) central, supported by stone arches and buttresses, tower contains ten bells. The exterior holds over two hundred carvings, including gargoyles that serve as water drains. Inside the sanctuary, ten stone angels supporting the nave beams face inward; several windows contain stained glass, including a Tiffany, a LaFarge, and a window over the altar was created by Franz Mayer & Co. of Germany. A 1200-pipe organ manufactured by the Jardine Company of New York City is also inside.
