= Cass Avenue Methodist Episcopal Church =

Historic church in Michigan, United States

- U.S. National Register of Historic Places
- U.S. Historic district – Contributing property
- Michigan State Historic Site
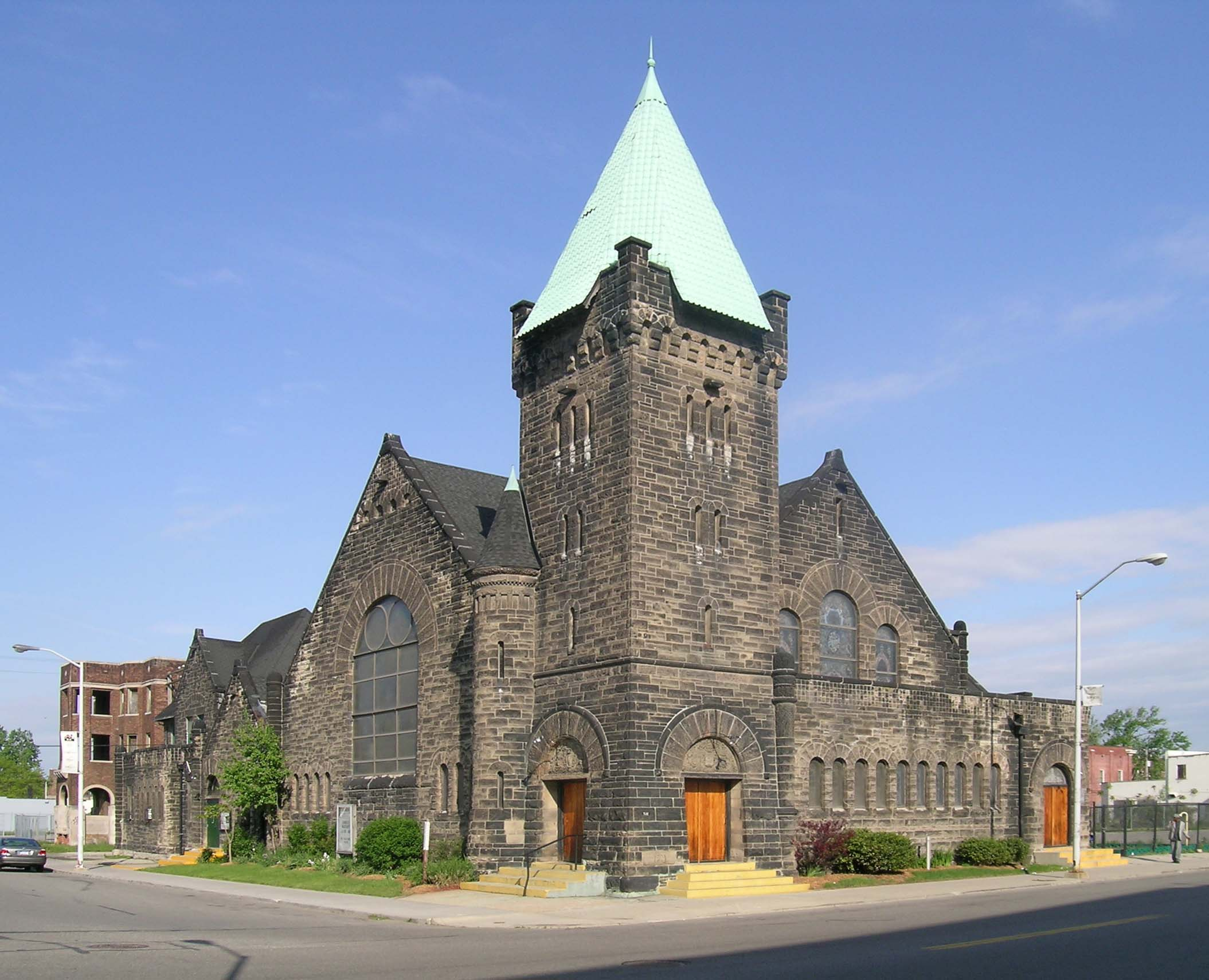
- Interactive map
- Location: 3901 Cass Avenue; Detroit, Michigan
- Coordinates: 42°20′53″N 83°3′47″W
- Built: 1883; 1891 (addition)
- Architect: Mason & Rice; Malcomson & Higginbotham
- Architectural style: Romanesque Revival
- Part of: Willis-Selden Historic District (ID97001478)
- NRHP reference No.: 82000548

Significant dates
- Added to NRHP: December 10, 1982
- Designated CP: December 01, 1997
- Designated MSHS: March 28, 1985

The Cass Community United Methodist Church is located at 3901 Cass Avenue in Midtown Detroit, Michigan. It was built in 1883 as the Cass Avenue Methodist Episcopal Church, listed on the National Register of Historic Places in 1982, and designated a Michigan State Historic Site in 1985.

== History ==
The Cass Avenue Methodist Episcopal Church was founded in 1880. In 1883, the congregation hired architectural firm Mason & Rice to design a church at the corner of Cass and Selden. In 1891, Malcomson and Higginbotham designed an addition on the eastern side, which is now the main portion of the church.

Early in the life of the church, the congregation was well-to-do. In the 1920s, however, the membership declined as congregants moved from the area and the character of the neighborhood changed. However, the church decided to remain in the neighborhood and minister to and with the new residents. The church is still operating as a United Methodist congregation, with services that change to meet the needs of the neighborhood.

== Architecture ==
The church is a Richardsonian Romanesque structure, constructed in the form of a Greek Cross. The church is built from rock faced Grafton stone, trimmed with Ionia sandstone. At the corner is a square tower, 86 feet high; the green ceramic tile roof is original. On the interior, Tiffany grace the windows; a Johnson - Tracker church organ is installed, which is thought to be the largest 19th-century pipe organ in Michigan.

A state of Michigan historical maker marks this church.

== See also ==
- Cass Community Social Services
