= Franklin H. Walker House =

Historic house in Michigan, United States

- U.S. National Register of Historic Places
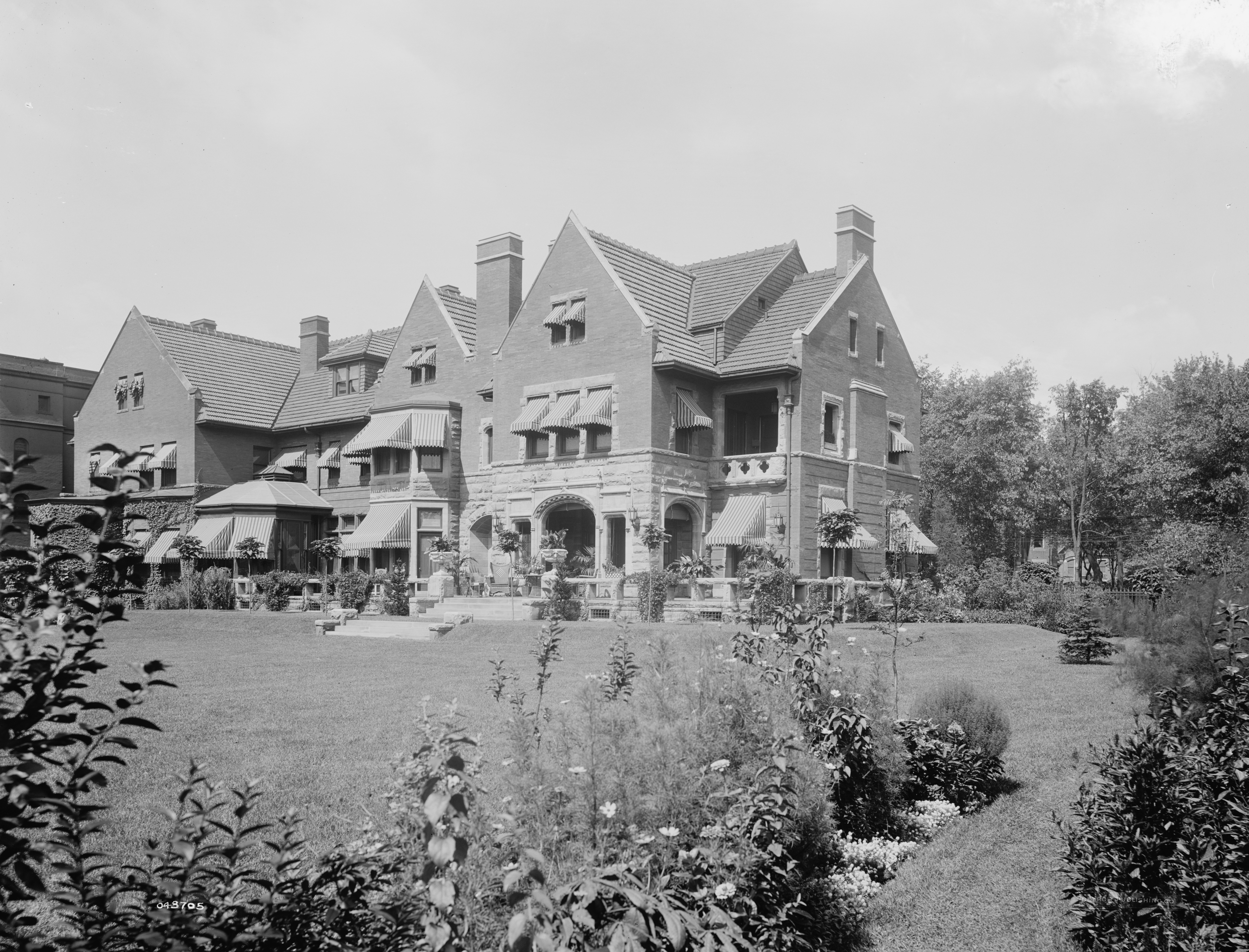
- Walker House c 1910
- Interactive map
- Location: 2730 East Jefferson Avenue; Detroit, Michigan
- Coordinates: 42°20′21″N 83°1′11″W
- Built: 1896
- Architect: George D. Mason
- Architectural style: Neo-Jacobean
- Demolished: 1998
- MPS: East Jefferson Avenue Residential TR
- NRHP reference No.: 85002948
- Added to NRHP: October 09, 1985

The Franklin H. Walker House was a private residence located at 2730 East Jefferson Avenue in Detroit, Michigan. It was also known as Doctor's Hospital. The house was listed on the National Register of Historic Places in 1985, but subsequently demolished in 1998. It was at the time the largest remaining house along Jefferson Avenue.

== Description ==
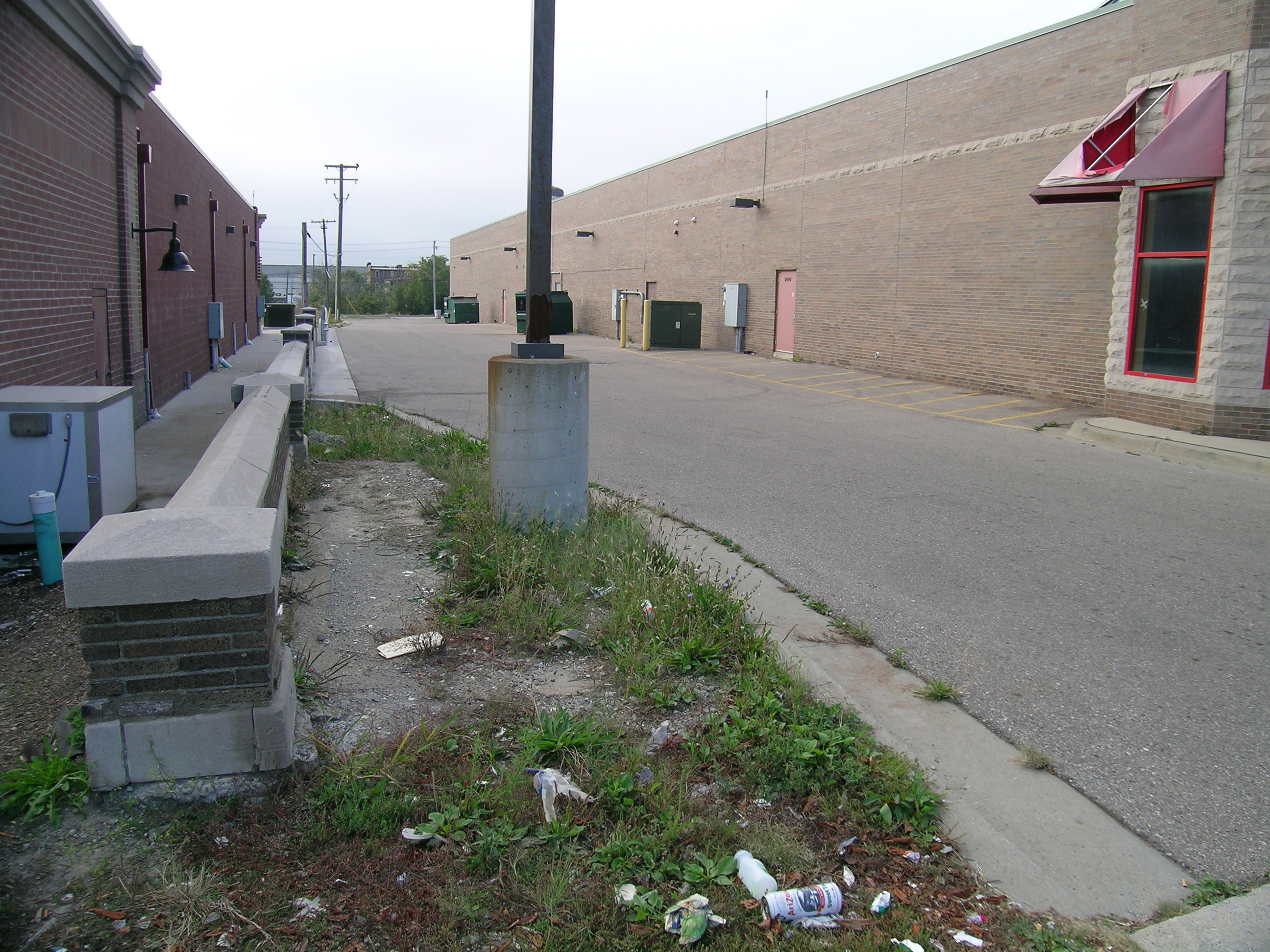
Lot the Walker House stood in 2008

The Franklin H. Walker House was a two-and-one-half-story structure, constructed of brown brick and rock-faced limestone. The massive Neo-Jacobean house was irregular in both floorplan and in height. A medieval-influenced octagonal tower with a pointed roof projected from one corner of the house; at the other corner, a two-story, three-sided bay window unit projected from the main bulk of the house. The gable roof was covered with tiles; walls at the gable ends terminated in fractables.

== History and significance ==
This home was built in 1896 for Franklin H. Walker, a son of Hiram Walker and president of the Hiram Walker Distillery. Walker hired George D. Mason to design the house. The house was notable for its immense size, diverse building materials, and medieval motif.

The house was eventually converted into a hospital, and extensively remodeled and added on to. The house was used until 1980 as Doctor's Hospital. It was demolished in 1998.
