= Gem Theatre (Detroit) =

Historic cinema and event venue in Detroit

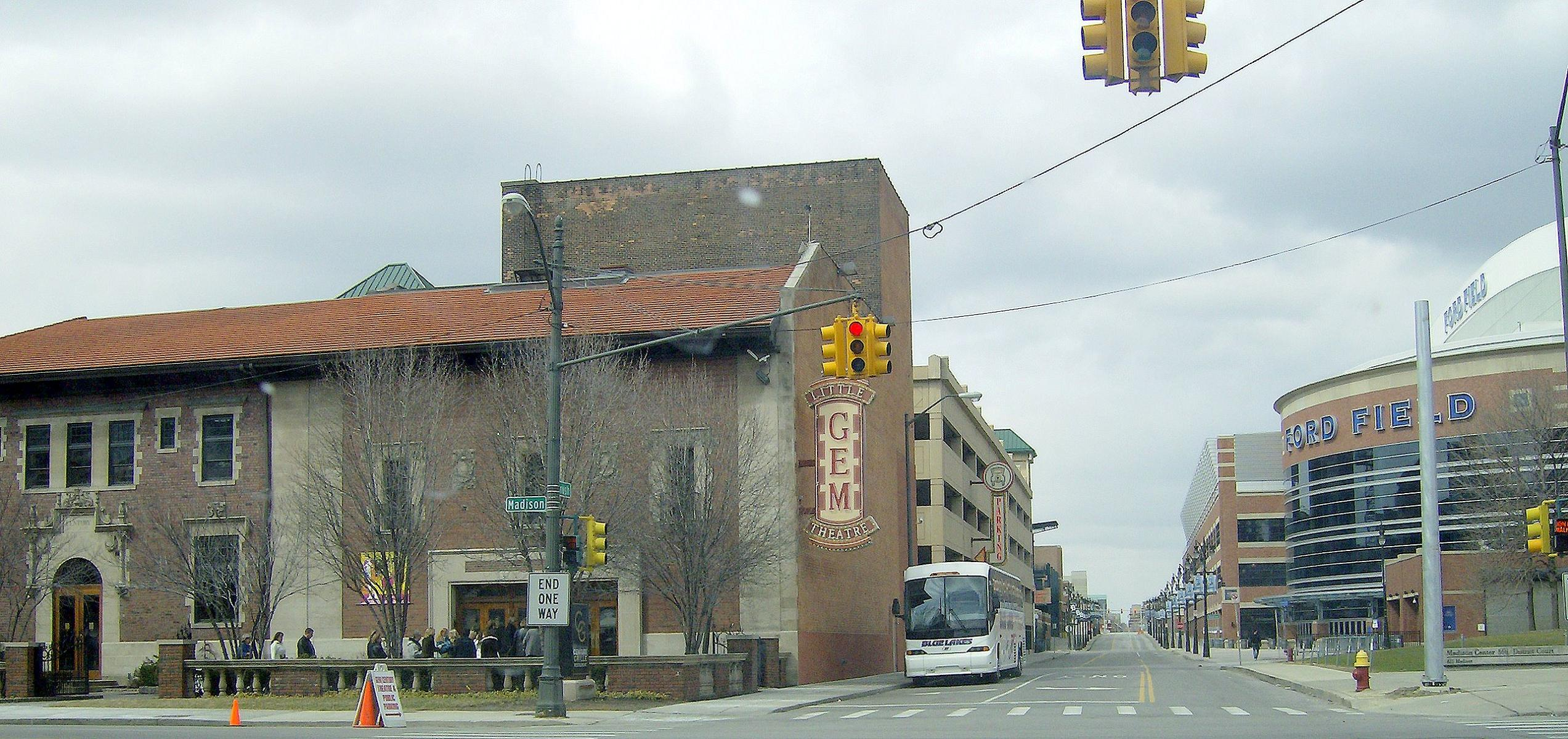
- Location between Century Theatre and Ford Field
- Interactive map of Gem Theatre
- Former names: Little, Rivoli, Drury Lane Europa, Cinema, & Vanguard Playhouse
- Location: 333 Madison Street; Detroit, Michigan 48226
- Coordinates: 42°20′15.63″N 83°2′46.22″W
- Owner: Forbes Hospitality
- Seating type: Traditional row and aisle seating in balcony; cabaret tables at stage level
- Capacity: 456
- Type: Wedding venue and general event venue, former movie theater

Construction
- Opened: 1927
- Closed: 1978
- Reopened: 1991

Website
- Gem Theatre
- Century Building and Little Theatre
- U.S. National Register of Historic Places
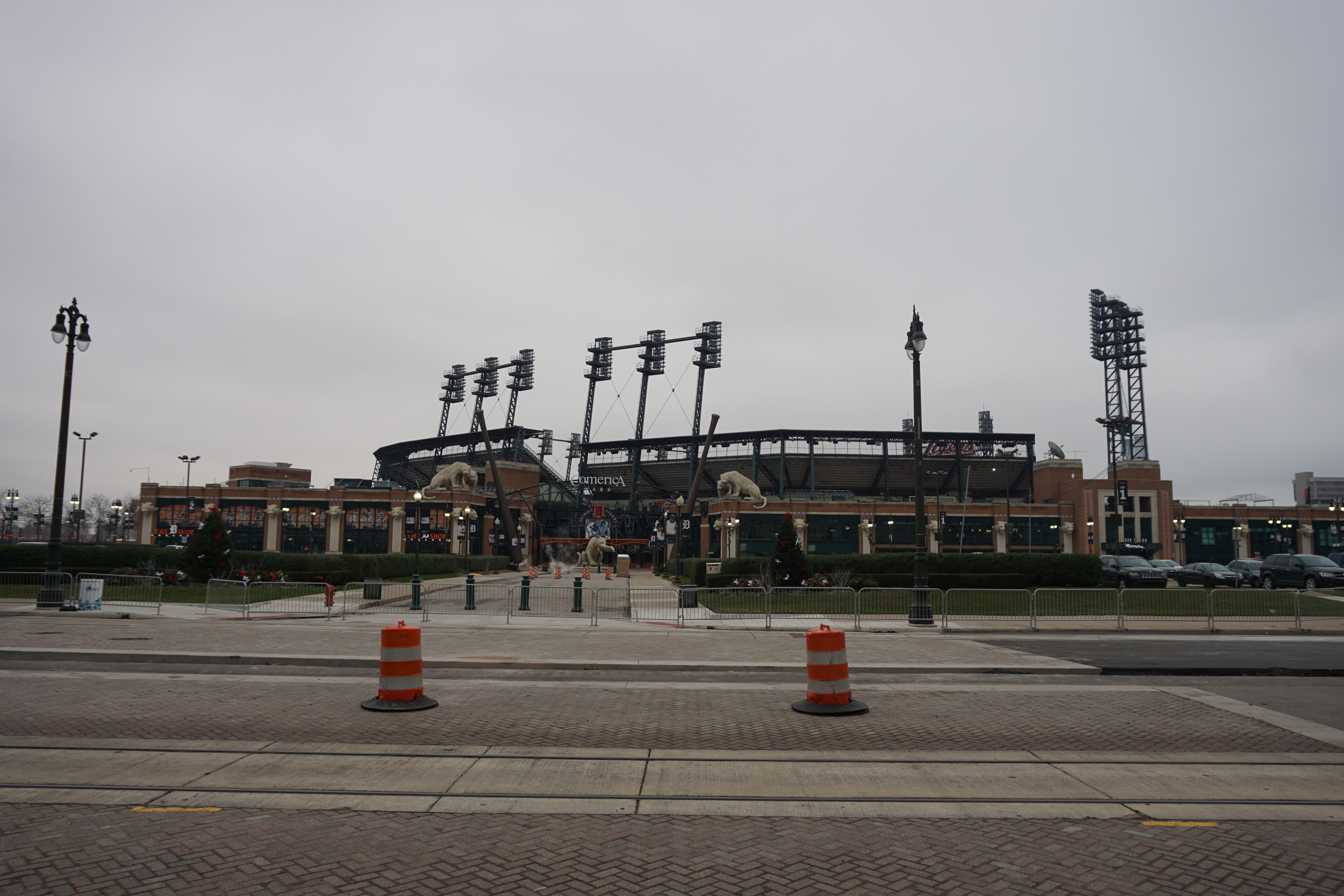
- Former location in Parking Lot #2, left, of Comerica Park
- Coordinates: 42°20′15″N 83°2′47″W
- Area: Comerica Park
- Architect: George D. Mason
- Former location: 62 East Columbia Street; Detroit, Michigan 48201
- Architectural style: Renaissance Revival, Spanish Revival
- NRHP reference No.: 85000993
- Added to NRHP: May 9, 1985

The Gem Theatre is an event facility located in Detroit, Michigan that has served as both wedding venue and private event space since 1991. Operated by Forbes Hospitality, the building consists of two theater spaces, Gem Theatre and Century Theatre. The venue also houses Century Dining Room on its lower level, and Century Club on the main level, acting as the building’s central hub. Once a traditional theater space with a rich history, today Gem Theatre aims to create unique, memorable experiences through its ornate architecture, hand-painted dining rooms, and outdoor patio.

== History ==
The Twentieth Century Club, a group of prominent local women, built the Century Club on Columbia Street in 1903. In 1927, in order to gain rental income, they built this movie theater next door as part of the Little Theatre Movement. The club closed in 1933 due to the Great Depression, but the adjacent cinema continued. The theater went through a variety of owners who in turn used different names: Little (1928-1932), Rivoli (1932-1934), Drury Lane (1935), Europa (1935-1936), and Cinema (1936-59). From 1960 to 1964, director George C. Scott established a live theater troupe called the Vanguard Playhouse.

In 1966, it became a pornographic theater called the Gem before eventually closing in 1978. The National Register of Historic Places listed the two vacant buildings as a single entry in 1985. Local developer Charles "Chuck" Forbes restored both the Gem and Century and opened them as event venues in 1991.

But, in 1997, they both faced demolition to clear space for the Comerica Park stadium project, the new home of the Detroit Tigers. Forbes led efforts to preserve the buildings by relocating them both to Madison Street next to the Detroit Athletic Club and across from the Music Hall. The buildings weighed 2,750 tons and were moved together on 72 dollies, each equipped with a 50-ton jack, for a total cost of $5.5 million. The five-block move covered 1,850 feet (563 meters).

That move set the record for the farthest distance a major building had ever been moved according to the Guinness Book of World Records. The History Channel's Mega Movers series featured the project and the National Register of Historic Places approved the move without delisting the building because the architectural integrity was preserved.

Since the move, the theatre primarily serves as a wedding and corporate venue, although it has also hosted several prominent events. During Super Bowl XL in 2006, ABC aired Jimmy Kimmel Live! on site for a week. Hillary Clinton and Bernie Sanders held a town hall during the 2016 Democratic presidential primary. In 2024, director Yuval Sharon staged Europeras 3 & 4 at the Gem in order to provide a more intimate venue than the nearby Detroit Opera House.

== Architecture ==
In 1927, the women's organization hired the same architect, George D. Mason, who had designed their clubhouse decades earlier. As a result, the front of the Gem uses the same red brick with sandstone trim as the attached Century Club. They also share a roof and cornice, so the new addition appears original.

Renaissance Revival details appear prominently on the exterior. The three windows on the second floor each have quoining and balconettes with wrought-iron railing. Between each window, are stone medallions that replaced a canopy in the 1940s. In contrast, the side of the building now facing Brush Street consists of common brick with no windows.

The interior employs Spanish Revival architecture. The shared lobby includes a wood-beamed lobby with local Pewabic Pottery used for wainscoting. A large arch dominates the 456-seat theater which is decorated with shields, rosettes, cupids, and fleur-de-lis all framed by tongue-and-dart and rope moldings.

== See also ==
- Lists of works by George D. Mason
- National Register of Historic Places listings in Downtown and Midtown Detroit
