= Tiny Homes Detroit =

Development of tiny homes

Tiny Homes Detroit is a development of small, one- and two-person tiny homes constructed for low-income tenants by Cass Community Social Services. The development is located on Elmhurst, Monterey and Richton Street, between Woodrow Wilson and the Lodge Freeway in Detroit. The Lodge Freeway is one of the most trafficked freeways in the Motor City.

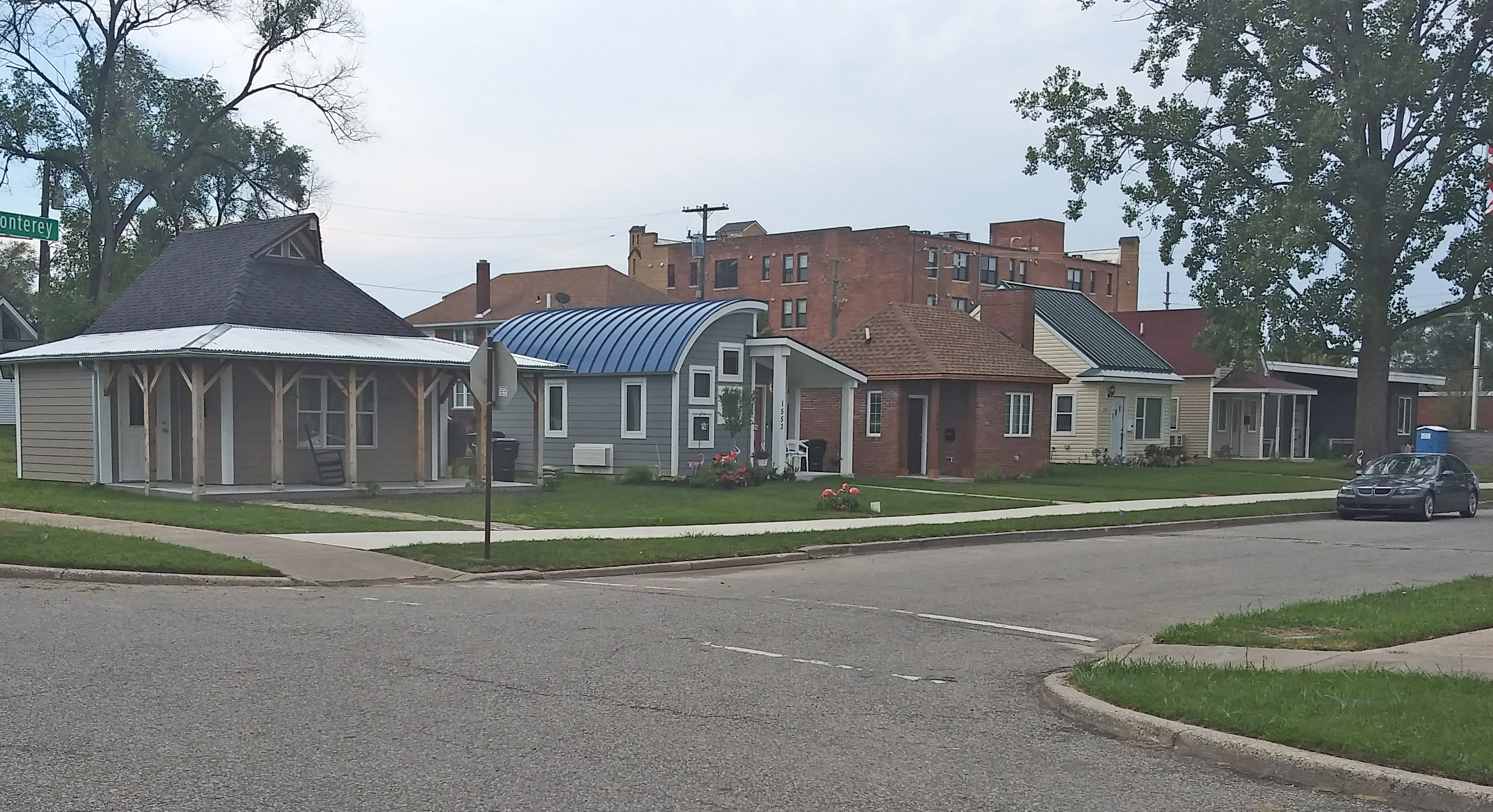

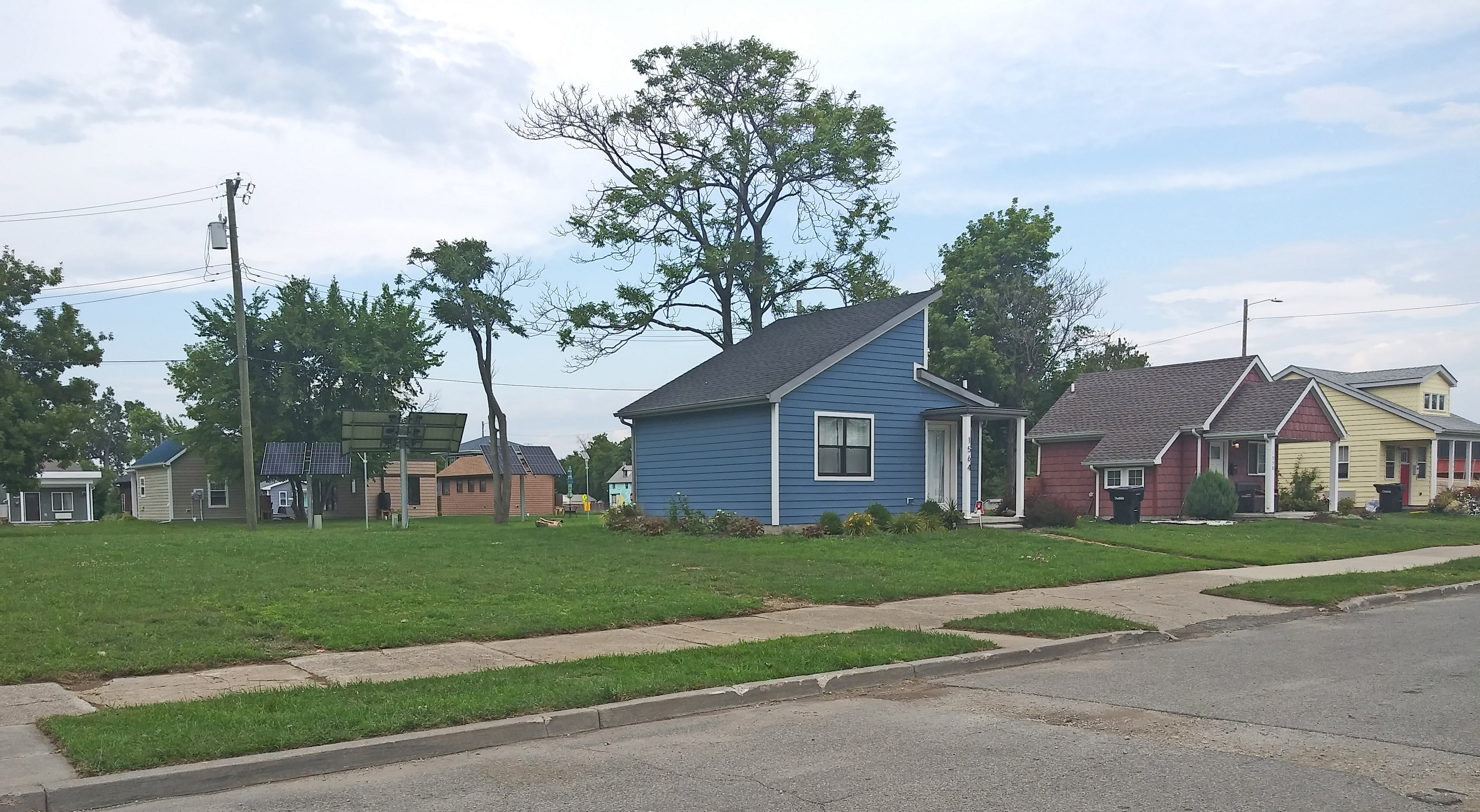

== History ==
The Tiny Homes project was started in 2016 by Rev. Faith Fowler, the executive director of Cass Community Social Services, in order to address asset inequality and create a financial safety net for working poor people in Detroit. The organization purchased 25 parcels of land, measuring 30 by 100 feet (9.1 m × 30.5 m), from the City of Detroit. The lots are located just west of the Lodge Freeway and only a few blocks north of the Cass headquarters at 11850 Woodrow Wilson. They obtained architectural plans for a variety of tiny homes, which ranged in size from 250 to 400 square feet (23 to 37 m^{2}) of floor space. Cass Community Social Services raised money from numerous sources for the project, with an estimated total budget of $1.5 million. Donors included Ford, Jon Bon Jovi, General Motors, staffing agency Epitec, and the Birmingham First United Methodist Church.

A model home was constructed in late 2016, and the first six homes in the development were completed by early 2017. Nineteen homes were completed by 2019. Additional larger homes for families are planned in the future.

According to a social media post by the agency on December 26, 2025, and the agency website, the Tiny Homes Detroit community currently has three homeowners, with two additional residents "slated to receive their deeds in 2026."

== Usage ==
The homes in the development are slated for low-income tenants making as little as $8,000 per year, with the intent to both address housing needs and set low-income tenant on the path to home ownership. The homes are rent-to-own, with tenants taking ownership after a seven-year period. As of 2022, there is a legal dispute regarding eviction and home ownership. The rent is set at $1 per square foot ($11/m^{2}), and includes all utilities. Tenants applying for the program also agree to meet with a financial coach, attend financial literacy classes, and volunteer on neighborhood projects.

When the first six homes were completed in 2017, 122 people applied for tenancy. Applicants were anonymously rated using a numerical scoring system, which factored in residential history, financial readiness, and personal references. The first tenants ranged in age from 24 to 74, and earn an average income of $988 a month.

== Description ==
Tiny Homes Detroit is located along three streets (Elmhurst, Monterey and Richton), between Woodrow Wilson and the Lodge Freeway.The development will contain 25 homes when completed. Houses are located on 30-by-100-foot (9.1 m × 30.5 m) lots, so each has a back yard.

The individual homes range from 250 to 400 square feet (23 to 37 m^{2}) and are designed for individuals or couples. The homes are unique, with distinctive colors and design elements. Architectural styles range from cottages to Colonial, Victorian, Tudor, and an environmental house, with each house being different. Each home contains appliances, a bed, sofa and dining table, and is solar powered. Several have porches or patios.
