= Engine House No. 18 (Detroit) =

- U.S. National Register of Historic Places
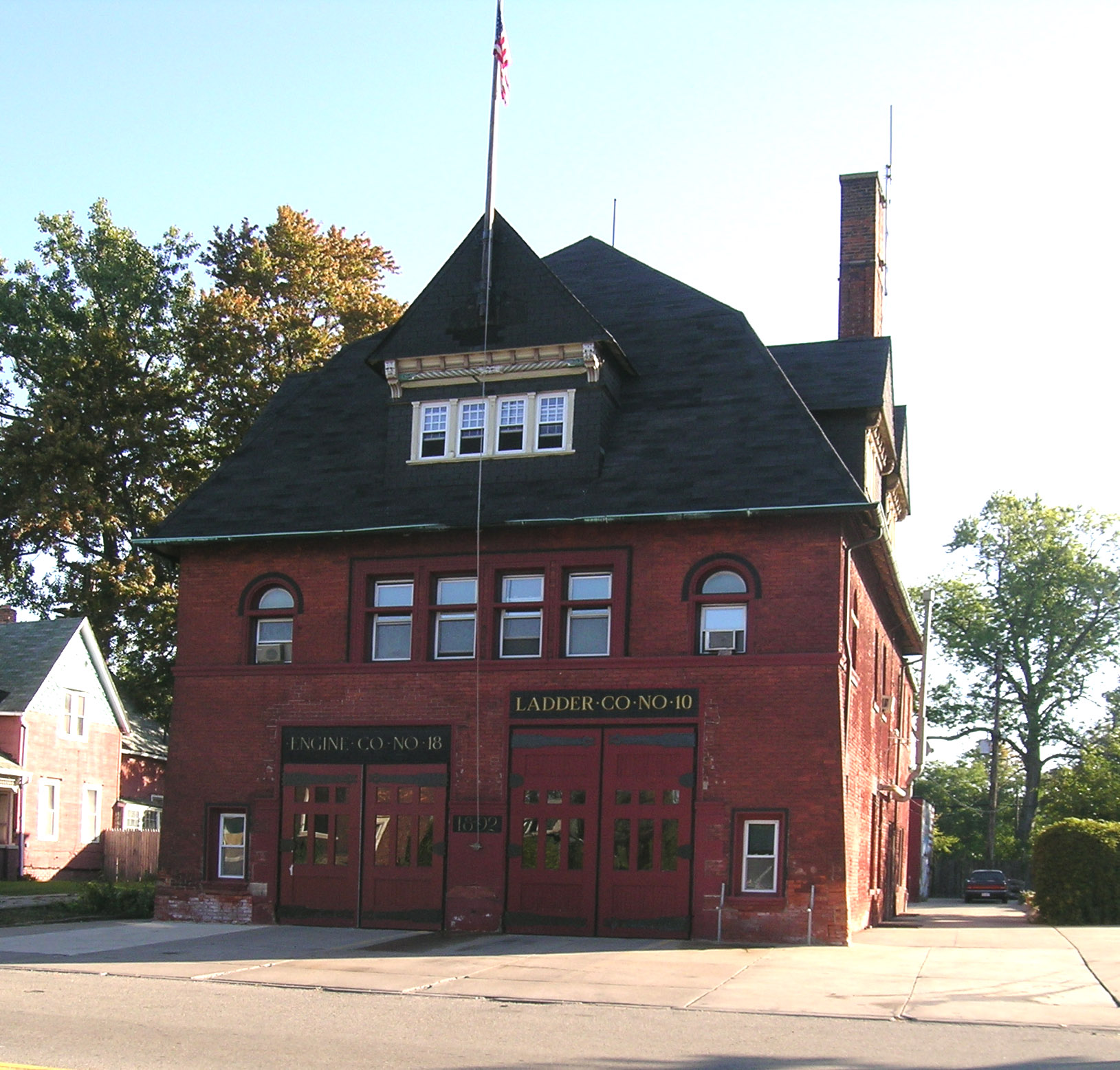
- Interactive map
- Location: 3812 Mt. Elliott Avenue; Detroit, Michigan
- Coordinates: 42°21′47″N 83°1′21″W
- Built: 1892
- Architect: George D. Mason & Zachariah Rice
- Architectural style: Queen Anne
- NRHP reference No.: 95001368
- Added to NRHP: November 29, 1995

The Engine House No. 18 is a fire station located at 3812 Mt. Elliott Avenue in Detroit, Michigan. It is also known as Engine Company No. 18 Fire Station. It is the third oldest existing (and was the oldest operating when closed in 2012) fire station in Detroit. The station was listed on the National Register of Historic Places in 1995.

== History ==
Land for this Engine House was purchased in 1891 for $2100 (equivalent to $66,000 in 2024). The building was designed by the Detroit architects George D. Mason and Zachariah Rice and constructed by Vinton & Co. for $20,228.14 (equivalent to $636,147 in 2024).

== Description ==
The Engine House is a two-story red brick building with trim of red-orange sandstone and salmon colored brick topped with a high double-pitch hip roof in the front and a lower roof in the rear. Dormers feature wooden cornices containing sculpted faces, serpents, and dragonheads. Two engine bays are located on the first floor, along with the station office, kitchen, and dining & recreation room. The sleeping quarters, officer's room, locker room and bathroom are on the second floor. A hose-drying chamber stretches from the first floor to the attic.

A rear addition to the original 1892 building was constructed in 1949; the site also houses a one-story, brick storage building at the rear of the lot.
