= Cass Community Social Services =

American nonprofit organization

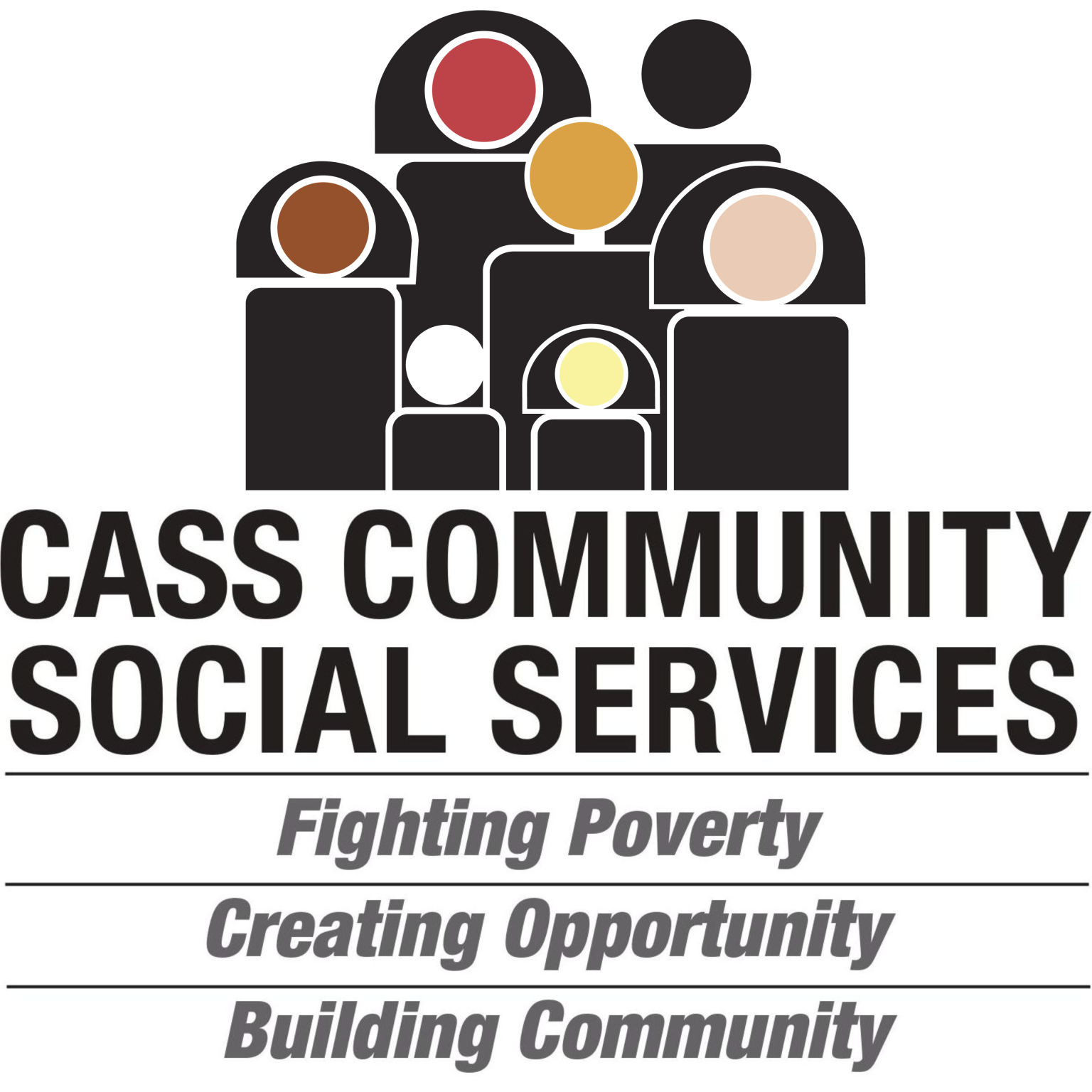
- Logo of Cass Community Social Services

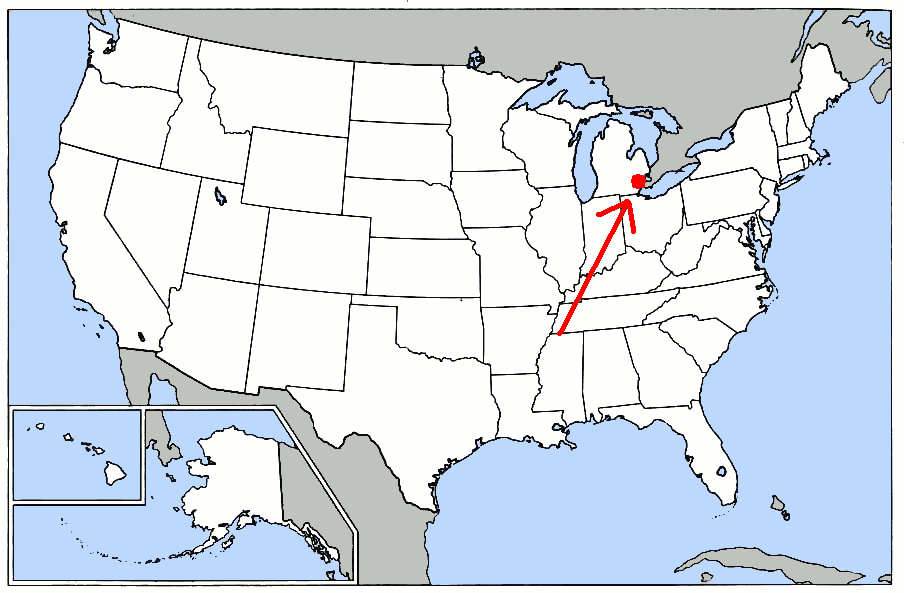
- Detroit
- Abbreviation: Cass
- Formation: 2002
- Type: Non-profit social service, residential, charity
- Purpose: Community building, fighting poverty
- Headquarters: Cass Scott Building @ 11850 Woodrow Wilson, Detroit, Michigan 48206
- Location: Detroit
- Region served: Detroit metro area, Wayne County area
- Executive director: Faith Fowler
- Main organ: Board of directors
- Staff: 92
- Volunteers: 5,000
- Website: casscommunity.org

Cass Community Social Services, Inc. (CCSS or Cass) is a nonprofit, 501(c)(3) community-based organization headquartered in Detroit, Michigan, serving Southeastern Michigan, Wayne County, under the direction of a volunteer Board of Directors. Cass Community Social Services has occasionally engaged in acts of political activism, usually In protest of city and state budget cuts.

== History of Cass Community Social Services ==
Cass Community Social Services originally began when during the Great Depression when the church opened up a soup kitchen. In the 1950s, Reverend Lewis Redmond expanded the church's social services, creating an evening program, a free bible class ("Praise Class") and a senior's program ("Project Scout").

In 1988 the group also started a homeless shelter and "drop in center" for the homeless as well. In 1991 a tent city was created in a nearby vacant lot to oppose the governor's cuts in social services.

The social services of Cass started as part of Cass Community United Methodist Church during the Great Depression. In 2002, they became independent when the Scott building opened and a separate nonprofit/Board of Directors was formed. The mission statement directs the activities of the organization: "Cass is dedicated to making a profound difference in the diverse populations it serves by providing for basic needs, including affordable housing, promoting self reliance and encouraging community inclusion and improvement."

== Funding ==
Cass Community Social Services uses 6 million dollars a year for its programs, of that, 5% comes from the Ford Motor Company, much of the rest comes from donations.

On January 20, 2010, USA Today reported on Cass' Green Gym, the nation's first green gym for homeless men, women and children. The gym was constructed through equipment and monetary donations.

In May 2017, the organization held a fundraiser called the Cass Community Social Services Tiny Homes Progressive Tour. Ticket-holders ($75/ticket or $100/two tickets) could tour the six tiny homes built by the organization in Detroit. At each home, participants could taste a treat prepared by chef Matt Prentice. The homes range in size from 250 to 400 square feet and are rent-to-own properties for qualifying individuals.
