= Century Theatre (Detroit) =

Theater in Detroit, Michigan

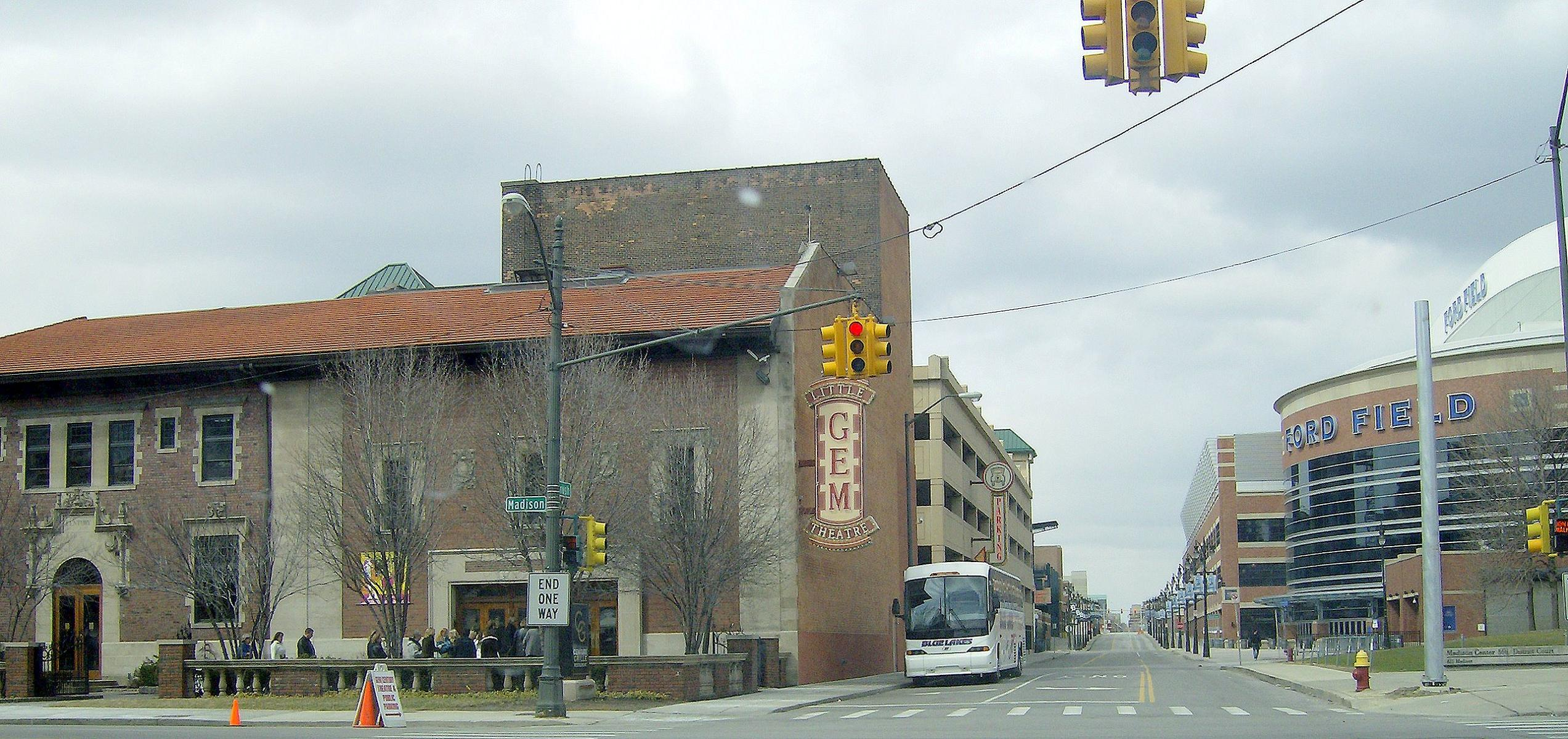
- Interactive map of Century Theatre
- Location: 333 Madison Avenue; Detroit, Michigan
- Coordinates: 42°20′15″N 83°2′46″W
- Capacity: 250

Construction
- Opened: 1903

The Century Theatre in Detroit shares a lobby with the Gem Theatre. The theatre has seating at cabaret tables, and the stage hosts quirky shows, such as Forbidden Broadway, Menopause the Musical, and Late Nite Catechism. The theatre building houses a restaurant, The Century Grille, and is a popular downtown Detroit destination for weddings and private events.

== History ==
Built in 1903 by the Twentieth Century Association and opened on December 26, the theater was the first building in Detroit to have a building permit issued in a woman's name. During The Great Depression, the Association disbanded and the theater foreclosed. The building housed a variety of businesses over the years until it finally closed in 1978. In 1990, developer Charles Forbes began a renovation to restore it. The Gem Theatre reopened on December 31, 1991, only to close again in 1997. Because of the fact it would be torn down due to Comerica Park, Forbes negotiated it so the theatre was moved five blocks away November 10, 1997. It broke the 1986 Guinness Book of World Records for the heaviest building moved on wheels
