= University–Cultural Center Multiple Resource Area =

- University–Cultural Center MRA
- U.S. National Register of Historic Places
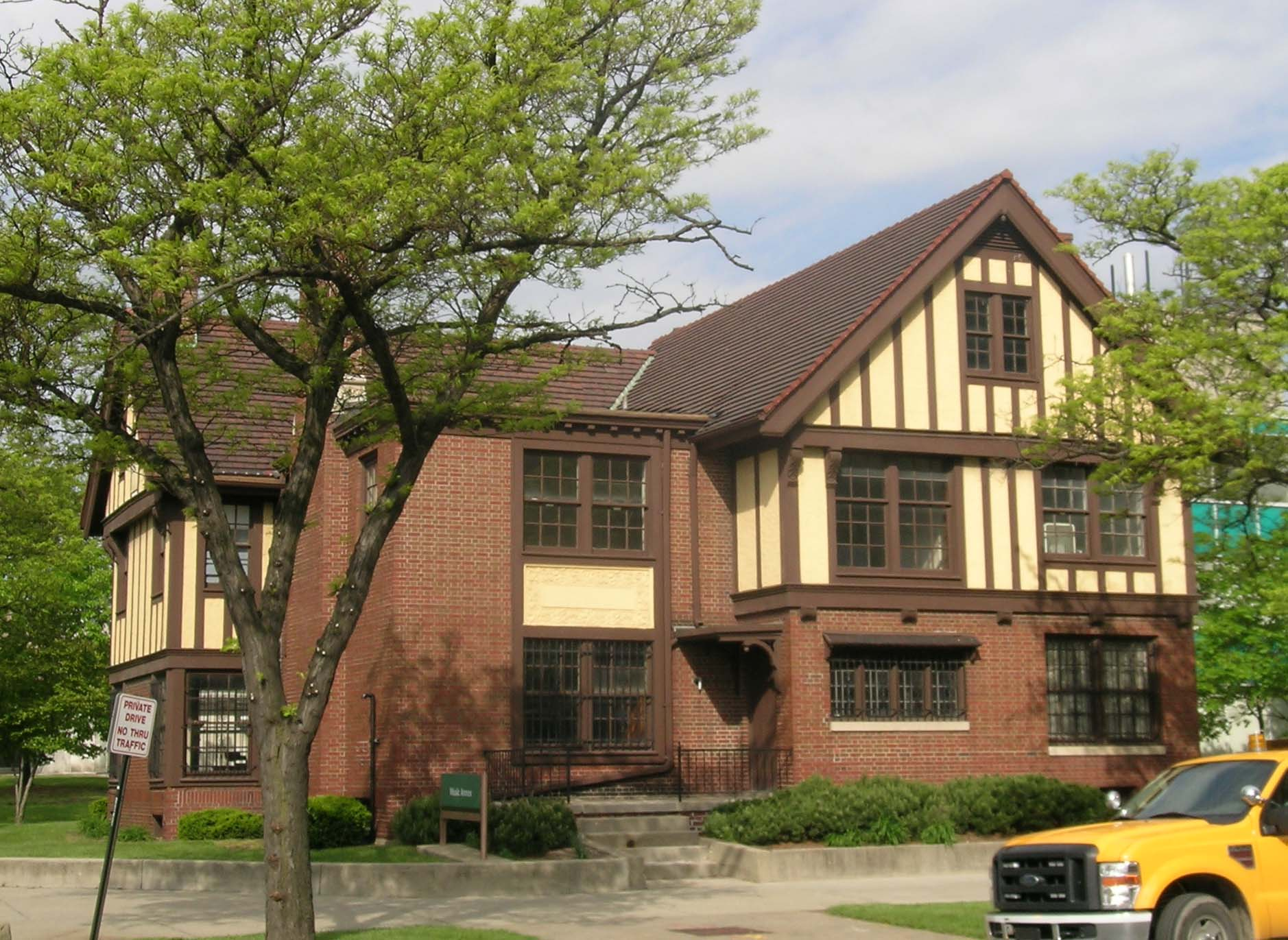
- Herman Strasburg House on Cass
- Location: Detroit, Michigan, U.S.
- Coordinates: 42°21′35″N 83°4′9″W
- Built: 1884–1927
- Architect: Marcus R. Burrowes; Cram, Wentworth & Goodhue; William G. Malcomson and William E. Higginbotham; Pollmar, Ropes & Lundy; James S. Rogers and Walter MacFarlane; William Scott & Co; F. W. Wiedmaier and John B. Gay
- Architectural style: Gothic Revival, Queen Anne, Romanesque Revival, Second Empire
- MPS: University–Cultural Center MRA
- NRHP reference No.: 86000996, 86001001, 86001003, 86001036 - 86001040,
- Added to NRHP: April 29 and May 1, 1986

The University–Cultural Center MRA (Multiple Resource Area) is a pair of multiple property submissions to the National Register of Historic Places which were approved on April 29 and May 1, 1986. The structures included are all located in Midtown, near Woodward Avenue and Wayne State University in Detroit, Michigan. The two submissions are designated the University–Cultural Center MRA Phase I, containing five properties, and the University–Cultural Center MRA Phase II, containing three properties.

== History ==
From the middle of the 19th century until the 1920s, the area that is now the University–Cultural Center was characterized by upper-class single-family homes. After the Civil War, the city of Detroit platted and sold lots along Woodward to private developers. Houses first appeared along Woodward in the 1860s, and construction in the area reached a peak in the 1880s and 1890s as developments off Woodward, first to the east and then to the west, were platted. Construction east of Second Avenue did not reach full swing until the early 1900s.

At the end of the 19th century, Central High School (now Old Main) was constructed on Cass and Warren. The building acted as a magnet, attracting other institutions that were educational and artistic in function, culminating in the erection of the Detroit Institute of Arts and the Detroit Public Library along Woodward Avenue in the 1920s.

The rise of the automobile in the 1910s and 1920s had a twofold effect on the University–Cultural Center area. The prosperous automotive trade increased the population of Detroit by nearly a factor of four between 1900 and 1920. This pushed the city limits far to the north, making what once had been a suburban, open area into the heart of the city. The University–Cultural Center area also became home to automotive-related commercial and industrial businesses, particularly along Woodward and Cass.

In the mid-1920s, large apartment buildings with first-floor commercial space were constructed in the area, bringing more residents into the area and reducing the pressure for store frontage. At the same time, the former residents of the upper-class, turn-of-the-century homes moved farther out into new neighborhoods such as Boston-Edison, Arden Park-East Boston, or Virginia Park. The remaining mansions were repurposed as boardinghouses or commercial space.

Cultural and educational institutions were being developed in the area at around the same time, beginning with the previously mentioned Detroit Institute of Arts and the Detroit Public Library. At the same time, Wayne State University, then housed in the former Central High School, began offering four-year degrees. These institutions formed a core area that attracted other public-oriented institutions, including several music schools, the Merrill-Palmer Institute, the Detroit Historical Museum, College for Creative Studies, and other institutions created campuses in the area.

In particular, Wayne State University has been continuously expanding since its inception as a four-year degree granting institution in the 1930s. The university first expanded out of its Old Main home in 1933, and four years later was utilizing over a dozen former residences in the vicinity. In the 1940s, the university obtained land in the surrounding blocks through emininent domain. Further increases in enrollment and the availability of Federal funds in the 1960s allowed the university to extend its campus south and west.

== Architecture ==
Because of its history, the structures within the University–Cultural Center come in four distinct types: the public-oriented buildings, commercial and industrial establishments, single-family homes, and large multi-unit apartment complexes.

The public-oriented buildings are most noticeable in the heart of the cultural complex, with the Detroit Institute of Arts and the Detroit Public Library, as well as other surrounding museums and cultural institutions. Wayne State University also sports a swath of public buildings on the west side of the area, many built in the 1950s and 1960s. In addition, a number of churches dot the area, including the Cathedral Church of St. Paul and the First Congregational Church.

The primary location of commercial buildings is along the Woodward and Cass corridors. Although the commercial activity is reduced from what it was in the heyday of the area, it still continues, particularly in service of students at Wayne State. Farther north in the area are sites which were originally primarily industrial, now grouped in the New Amsterdam Historic District and the Piquette Avenue Industrial Historic District.

The housing stock in the area is substantially constructed before 1914. Of these, the original single- family homes have been substantially demolished to make way for the waves of redevelopment as multi-unit structures, commercial structures, and cultural and educational-related structures were erected. Some pockets of single-family homes remain, notably in the eastern section with the East Ferry Avenue Historic District, the homes near Dunbar Hospital, and just south of the University–Cultural Center (but within Midtown), Brush Park. In the west, the West Canfield Historic District stands as the single contiguous block of early homes in the area. Other single-family homes exist individually.

Many of the earlier homes were replaced by multi-unit apartment structures. Early, smaller apartment buildings predominate in the area, particularly along Second Avenue. These units are typically four to five stories in height and were built in the mid-1910s and early 1920s. Later large apartment buildings, typically nine to thirteen stories in height, were built during the housing boom of the 1920s; this typology includes The Wardell (now The Park Shelton) and the Belcrest.

Many of the structures within the University–Cultural Center area were designed by well-known architects, including Albert Kahn, Cass Gilbert, Louis Kamper, Gordon W. Lloyd, Donaldson and Meier, and Ralph Adams Cram. Architectural styles of the buildings in the area representsd the range of styles current at the time of construction. Early single-family homes show Second Empire, Romanesque Revival, and particularly Queen Anne stylings. Later residences were built in the Colonial Revival and Federal Revival styles. Great public buildings such as the DIA and the library were built in the Italian Renaissance with Beaux-Arts influences.

=== Phases I and II ===
At the time of the original submission, the area continued within the University–Cultural Center had numerous structures and historic districts already listed on the National Register of Historic Places. These included structures built as private homes (the David Mackenzie House, Col. Frank J. Hecker House, and David Whitney House), public-oriented structures (the Hilberry Theatre, Scarab Club, Orchestra Hall, Detroit Institute of Arts, Rackham Building, Detroit Public Library, and Old Main), large apartment and commercial buildings (the Belcrest and Maccabees Building) and two historic districts (the East Ferry Avenue Historic District and the West Canfield Historic District).

When researching structures within the University–Cultural Center, the decision was made by the group nominating the structures to concentrate on two specific areas. For Phase I, the area bounded by Woodward Avenue on the east, Second Avenue on the west, Warren Avenue on the south, and the Ford Freeway on the north was targeted. For Phase II, the area on the campus of Wayne State University and bounded by Second avenue on the east and the Lodge Freeway on the west was targeted.

Resource name	Image	Address	Built	Architect	Phase	Note
Cass Motor Sales		5800 Cass Avenue	1928	Unknown	Phase I	
Samuel L. Smith House		5035 Woodward Avenue	1889	Rogers and MacFarlane	Phase I	
Thomas S. Sprague House		80 West Palmer Street	1884	William Scott & Co	Phase I	This structure has been demolished.
Herman Strasburg House		5415 Cass Avenue	1915	Marcus Burrowes	Phase I	
Verona Apartments		92 West Ferry Street	1894	William G. Malcomson, William E. Higginbotham	Phase I	
Chatsworth Apartments		630 Merrick Street (now on Wayne State University's campus)	1927	Pollmar, Ropes & Lundy	Phase II	
Saint Andrew's Memorial Episcopal Church		5105 Anthony Wayne Drive (now on Wayne State University's campus)	1894	Cram, Wentworth & Goodhue	Phase II	
Santa Fe Apartments		681 Merrick Street (now on Wayne State University's campus)	1925	F. W. Wiedmaier, John B. Gay	Phase II	This structure has been demolished.

These structures represent each faced of the mixed-use history of the University–Cultural Center, from the original upper-class single-family homes (the Herman Strasburg House, the Thomas S. Sprague House, and the Samuel L. Smith House), to the later apartments, both small (Verona Apartments) and large (the Chatsworth Apartments and Santa Fe Apartments), to commercial establishments (Cass Motor Sales) and public-oriented institutions (Saint Andrew's Memorial Episcopal Church). Many of these structures have been repurposed as the character of the area changes and different types of space a re required.

== Location ==
The University–Cultural Center is a section of Detroit bounded by the Chrysler Freeway (I-75) on the east, the Lodge Freeway (M-10) on the west, the Grand Trunk Railroad tracks on the north, and Selden Street, Parsons Street, East Willis Street, and East Warren Avenue on the south. This particular appellation has fallen out of use, replaced by "Midtown", which extends the southern University–Cultural Center boundary to the Fisher Freeway (I-75), and contracts the northern boundary to the Edsel Ford Freeway (I-94). All the structures in this MRA are located within Midtown. The section of the University–Cultural Center not included in Midtown is primarily industrial in nature (unlike the residential and commercial buildings in this MRA), and contains the New Amsterdam Historic District and the Piquette Avenue Industrial Historic District.

== See also ==
- University District, Detroit
