= Verona Apartments =

Verona Apartments may refer to:

- Verona Apartments (Springfield, Massachusetts), listed on the NRHP in Hampden County
- Verona Apartments (Detroit), listed on the National Register of Historic Places in Wayne County
- Verona Apartments (Cincinnati, Ohio), listed on the National Register of Historic Places in Hamilton County
