= Thomas S. Sprague House =

Historic house in Michigan, United States

- U.S. National Register of Historic Places
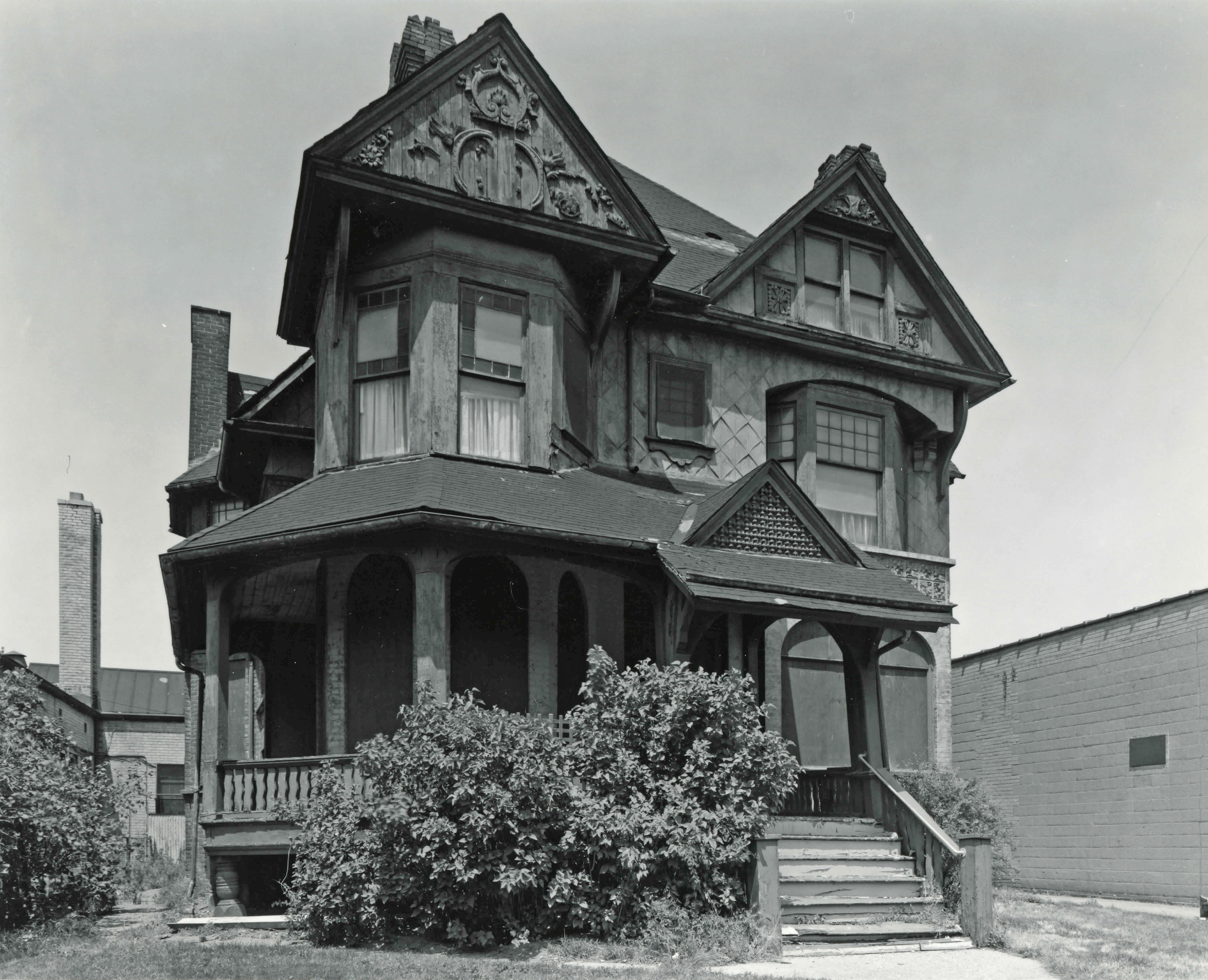
- Thomas S. Sprague House, 1984
- Interactive map
- Location: 80 West Palmer Avenue; Detroit, Michigan
- Coordinates: 42°21′42″N 83°4′11″W
- Built: 1884
- Architect: William Scott & Co.
- Architectural style: Queen Anne, Shingle style
- Demolished: c. 1986
- MPS: University–Cultural Center Phase I MRA
- NRHP reference No.: 86001037
- Added to NRHP: April 29, 1986

The Thomas S. Sprague House was a private residence located at 80 West Palmer Avenue in Midtown Detroit, Michigan. It was listed on the National Register of Historic Places in 1986, but was subsequently demolished.

== History ==
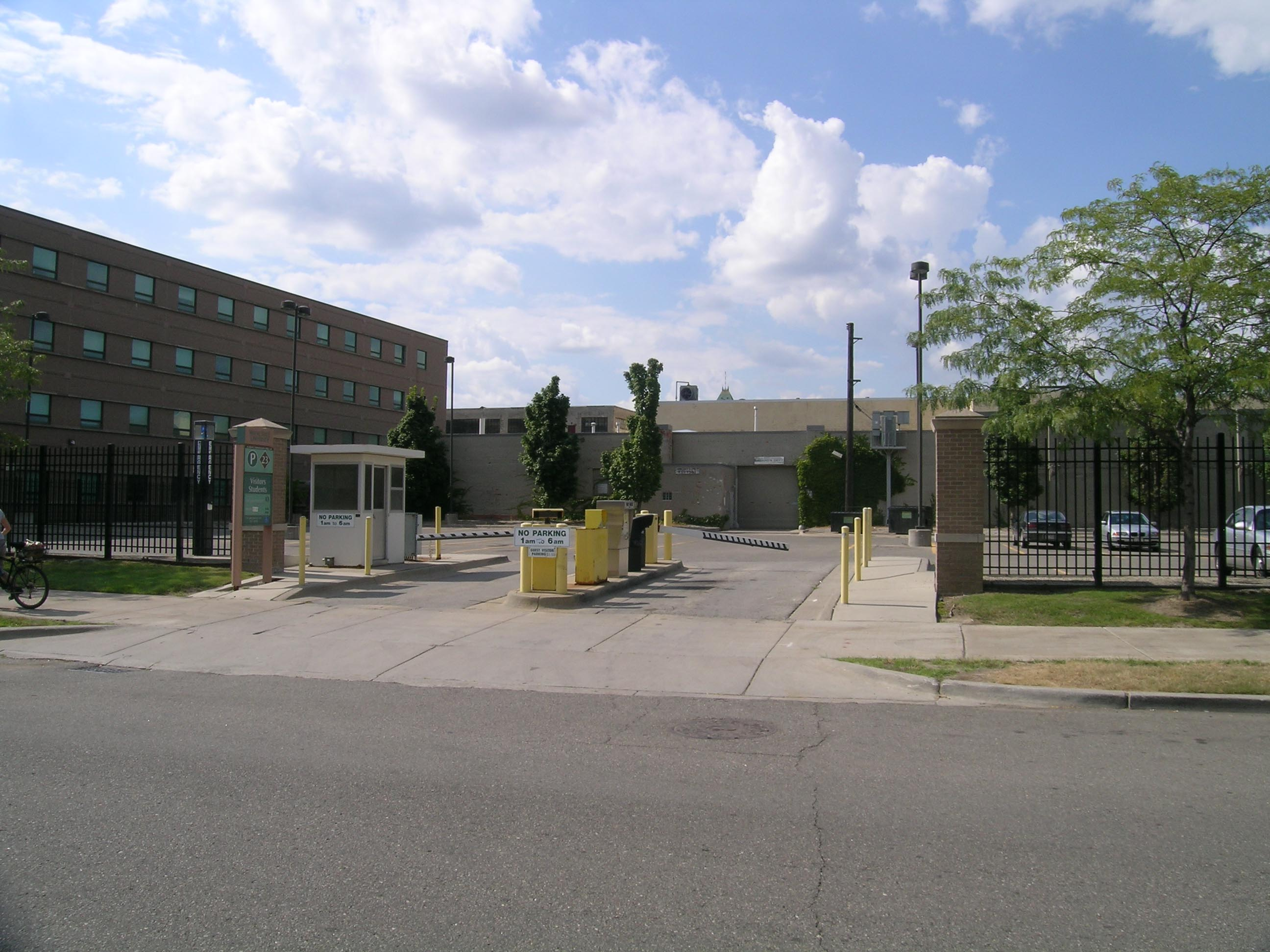
Parking lot where the Thomas S. Sprague House once stood

William Scott & Company constructed this house for Thomas S. Sprague, a Detroit real estate developer. Sprague himself lived in the house from 1884 to 1901, when Detroit Evening News editorial writer Arthur D. Welton moved into the house. Arthur Patriache, a manager for the Pere Marquette Railroad, lived in the house from 1905 to 1916. Restaurateur Michael Guarnieri purchased the house in 1916, and it remained in the Guarnieri family possession until 1977, when Wayne State University purchased the property. The house was demolished in 1994.

== Description ==
The Thomas S. Sprague House was a 2 1/2-story Queen Anne / Shingle style house. The front facade had a variety of projecting and receding elements, and a variety of surface treatments, creating an asymmetric composition with rich texture. A one-story hipped roof porch covered the center entrance, and wrapped around a corner octagonal turret. To the side of the entrance was a triple window surmounted with stained glass. Double hung first floor windows in the turret were also topped by arched stained glass sections. The turret was topped with a gable which made the structure into a bay window. Another bay window was set into the opposite side of the facade.

The interior of the house was maintained in nearly original form for almost 100 years. The interior contained combination gas-electric chandeliers, stained glass windows, patterned hearth tiles, and a radiator with a glass door warming oven. A unique asymmetrical butternut fireplace with mantelpiece was in the parlor.
