= Cass Motor Sales =

- U.S. National Register of Historic Places
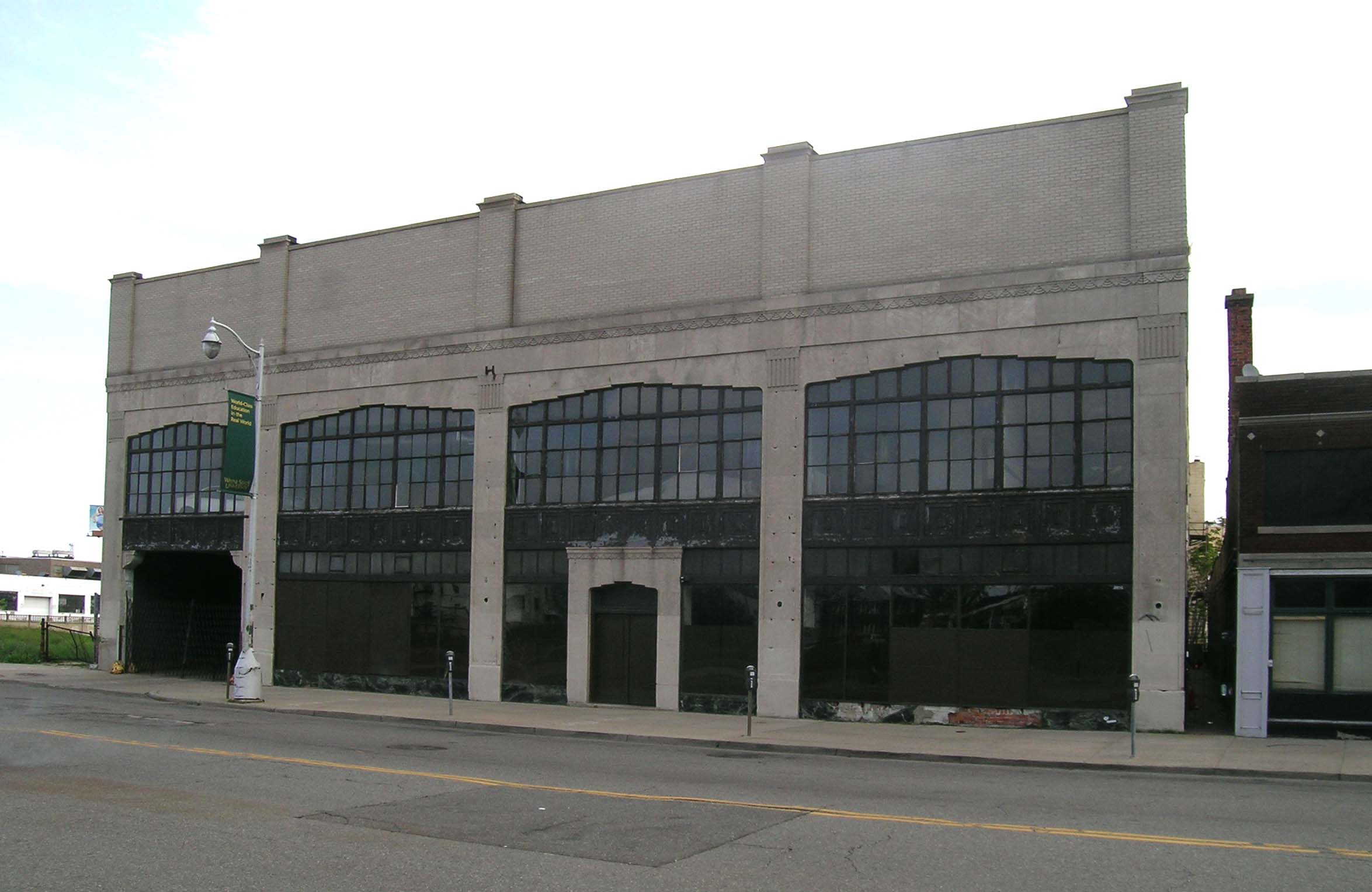
- Interactive map
- Location: 5800 Cass Avenue; Detroit, Michigan
- Coordinates: 42°21′43″N 83°4′12″W
- Built: 1928
- Architect: Charles N. Agree
- Architectural style: Art Deco
- MPS: University–Cultural Center Phase I MRA
- NRHP reference No.: 86001039
- Added to NRHP: April 29, 1986

The Cass Motor Sales is a commercial building located at 5800 Cass Avenue in Detroit, Michigan, USA. It was listed on the National Register of Historic Places in 1986.

== History ==
The Cass Motor Sales Company was established in 1925 as a Chrysler car dealership by Richard A. Cott, an immigrant from England. In 1928, Cott paid approximately $146,000 to have this building constructed. Architect Charles N. Agree designed the building. From 1928 - 1933, Cass Motor Sales sold Marmon Motor Car Company vehicles. After 1933, when Marmon went out of business, Cass again sold Chryslers. Richard A. Cott died in 1965, and in 1969 Cass Motor Sales ceased operations. The building was sold to Dalgleish Cadillac, who operated it until the dealership closed in 2010.

In 2015 the building was renovated into first floor retail space now occupied by Carhartt's flagship store and office space above.

== Architecture ==
The Cass Motor Sales is a three-story rectangular structure, typifying Art Deco architecture as applied to commercial buildings. The building was designed as an integrated showroom, sales office, and service center. The building contains 51.000 square feet over 3 floors.

The building is four bays wide, with each bay separated by engaged columns. Three bays are of equal size; the fourth, smaller bay contains a vehicle entrance. The pedestrian entrance is in the center of the third bay. The building once had an attractive facade of black marble and colored plates, with the marble running across the base of the bay sections, and black colored metal panels providing a decorative separation between the first and second stories.

Noticeable Art Deco features include the stepped arch above the entrance and second story windows and the geometric pattern in the string course between the second and third floors and over the front entrance.
