= Herman Strasburg House =

Historic house in Michigan, United States

- U.S. National Register of Historic Places
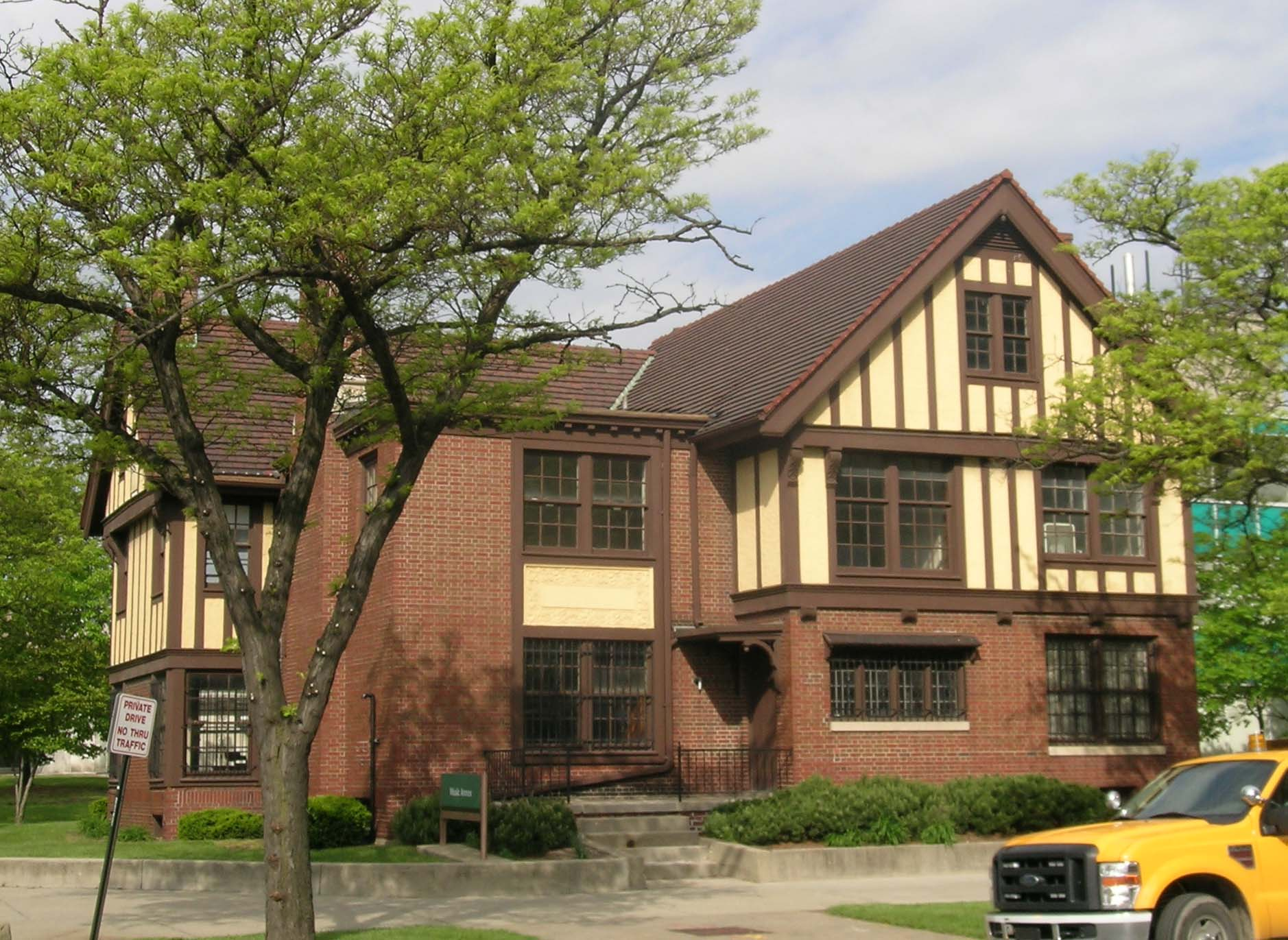
- Interactive map
- Location: 5415 Cass Avenue; Detroit, Michigan
- Coordinates: 42°21′35″N 83°4′9″W
- Built: 1915
- Architect: Marcus R. Burrowes
- Architectural style: Tudor Revival, Arts and Crafts
- MPS: University–Cultural Center Phase I MRA
- NRHP reference No.: 86001036
- Added to NRHP: April 29, 1986

The Herman Strasburg House is located at 5415 Cass Avenue in Midtown Detroit, Michigan. It is now known as the Wayne State University Music Annex. The building was listed on the National Register of Historic Places in 1986.

== History ==
Herman Strasburg Sr. established was one of the leading dance teachers in Detroit in the 19th century. His son, Herman Strasburg Jr., was born in Detroit in 1860. After graduating from high school in 1876, he joined his father's dancing school, and in 1883 became owner of the business after his father's death.

In 1914, Strasburg and his wife Ida purchased this lot on Cass. The following year, they hired architect Marcus R. Burrowes to design the house on Cass Avenue. This was shortly after Burrowes left the firm of Stratton-Baldwin, a leader in bringing Arts and Crafts style to Detroit. Herman Strasburg died in 1918, leaving his dance academy and house to his son Paul. The Strasburg family occupied the home until 1925, although it is not clear if the house was used as a private residence or a dance studio.

From 1925 to 1928, Harrison B. Anderson and Jean Campbell occupied the house, and from 1928 and 1931, Mary Fitzpatrick, who lived nearby, rented out rooms in the house to tenants. In 1931, Bendetson Netzorg purchased the house, and lived there with his parents and sister. He also used the house for his piano school, living there until 1944. In 1949, Wayne State University bought the property, using it first as the Wayne University Choral Studio and later as the Wayne State University Music Annex.

== Architecture ==
The Herman Strasburg house is an asymmetrical, two-and-one-half-story house, and is one of the best examples of Tudor Revival architecture in Detroit containing Arts and Crafts elements. The first floor is clad in attractive red brickwork, while the second floor is characteristically half-timbered. The roof is cross-gabled, with projecting half-timbered gable ends and a pendant decoration at the peak. Most windows are double hung, although there are some leaded casement windows on the first floor.

The interior has been extensively renovated. However, the original oak woodwork, paneling, and cabinetry remains intact. The main staircase is ornately carved, and the living room has a plastered barrel vault ceiling.
