= Julius Theodore Melchers =

American artist (1829–1908)

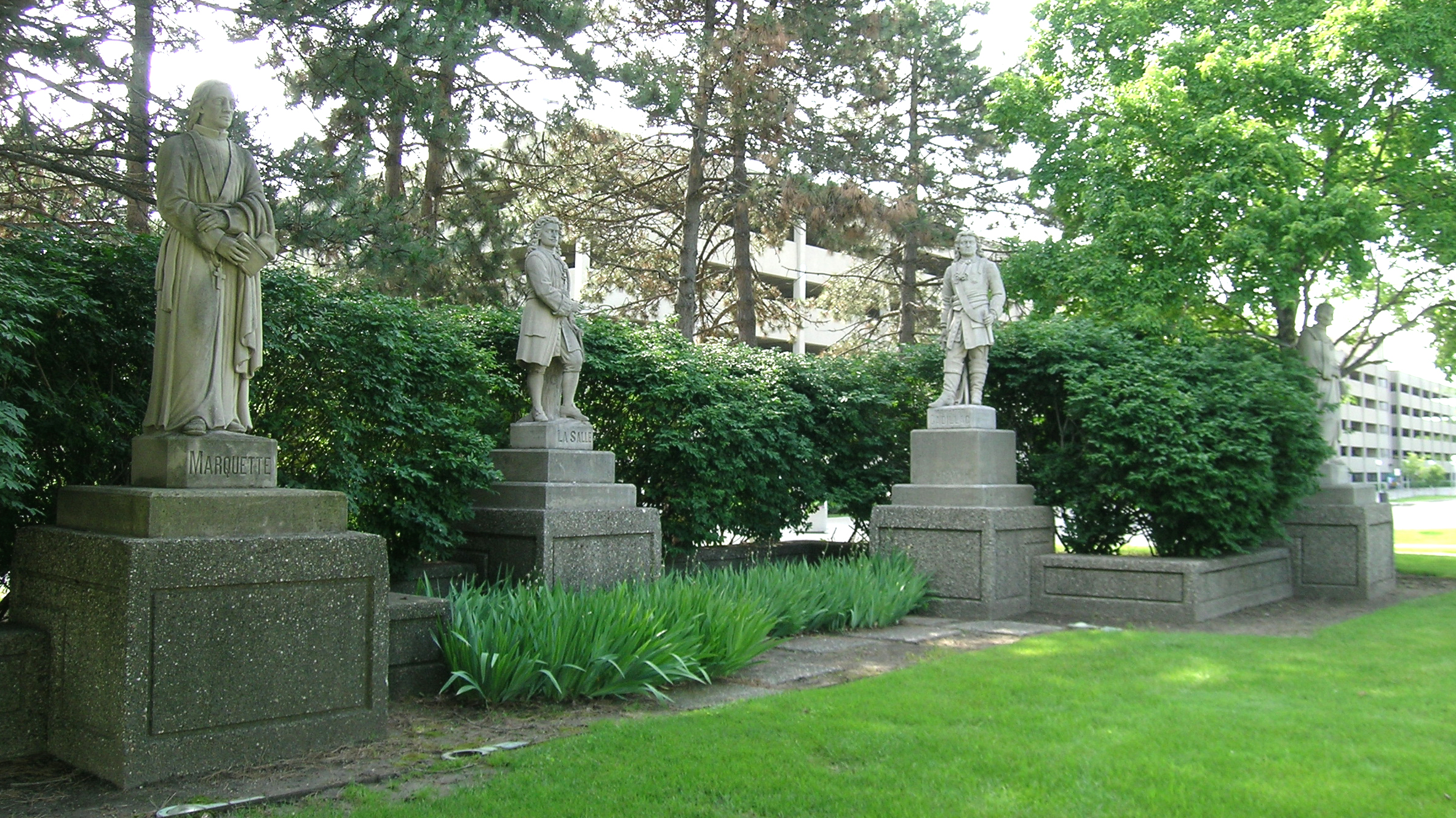
Statues in front of Saint Andrew's Memorial Episcopal Church, sculpted by Julius Theodore Melchers.

Julius Theodore Melchers (1829–1908) was a German born American sculptor and teacher who immigrated to the United States leaving Prussia after 1848 and resided in Detroit, Michigan after 1855 . During the Gilded Age, he became a "sculptor of great renown in the Detroit area." The Julius T. Melchers House (1897) by Donaldson and Meier is located at 723 Seyburn, in the Indian Village Historic District on which Julius carved the ornate gable. The likelihood that Melchers left Europe, as did so many other in and after the turbulent year of 1848 for political reasons is somewhat supported that he named his son (called, "Gari") after the famous Italian patriot and revolutionary Garibaldi.

== Birth and emigration ==
Julius Theodore Melchers, was born in Soest, Westphalia, Prussia. At age fifteen, while still in Prussia, Julius T. Melchers studied carving then studied at the Ecole des Beaux Arts in Paris with Carpeaux and Étex. Before moving to the United States, he worked as a modeler at the Crystal Palace in London as well as carving ships figureheads.

== Children ==
He had four children: Hettie Melchers, who married Julius Stroh of the Stroh brewing family in June 1883. The couple lived in an Italianate mansion on E. Jefferson Ave across from Van Dyke. His first son, Gari Melchers, born in 1860, was an artist. His second daughter was Julia Melchers, who married Spencer Otis of Barington, Illinois. His second son was Arthur Carl Melchers, co-founder of the Koppitz-Melchers Brewing Company in Detroit.

== Stroh Brewing Company ==
Julius T. Melchers served as Vice President of B. Stroh Brewing Company.

According to Nawrocki and Holleman, Julius T. Melchers was Detroit's first sculptor. Bela Hubbard (1814–1896), a lumber baron and real estate mogul, commissioned Julius T. Melchers to carve the "larger than life" sandstone statues of Detroit's four French pioneers, Fr. Jacques Marquette, Sieur de LaSalle, Antoine Cadillac, and Fr. Gabriel Richard installed in 1874 on the old Detroit City Hall (1871). Architect John M. Donaldson had created the model Melchers had used for the statue of Marquette. When the old Detroit City Hall was demolished in 1961 the statues were saved and moved to the campus of Wayne State University.

== Photo gallery ==
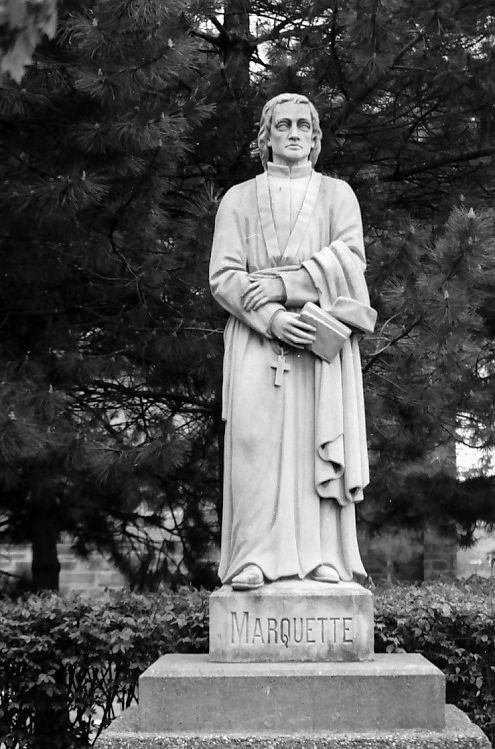
Marquette

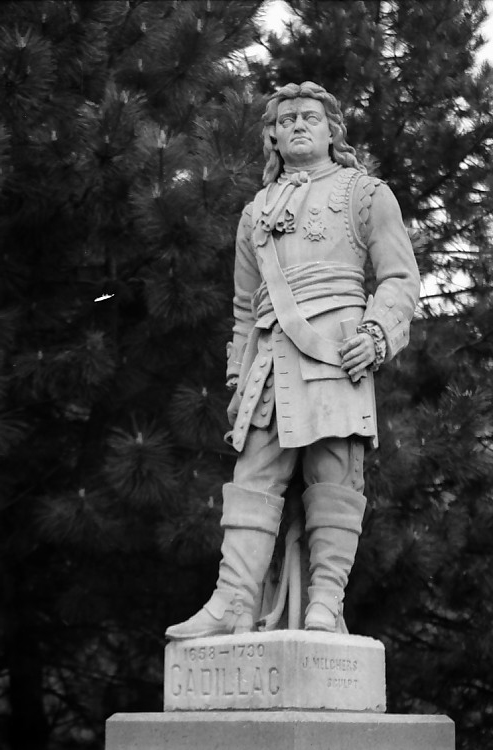
Cadillac

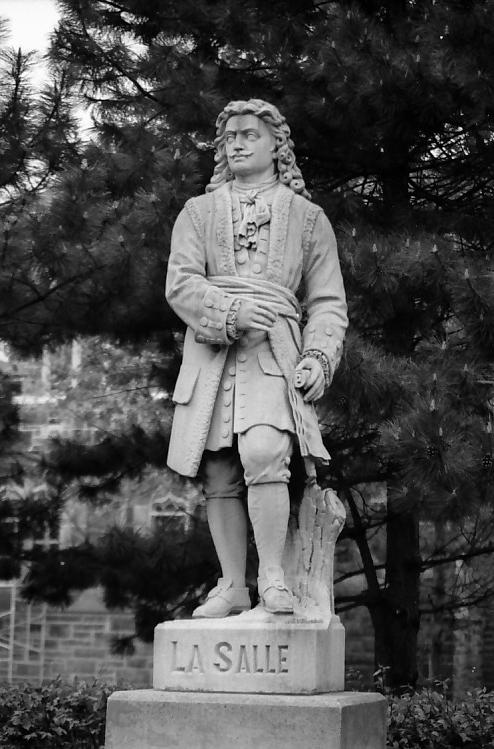
LaSalle

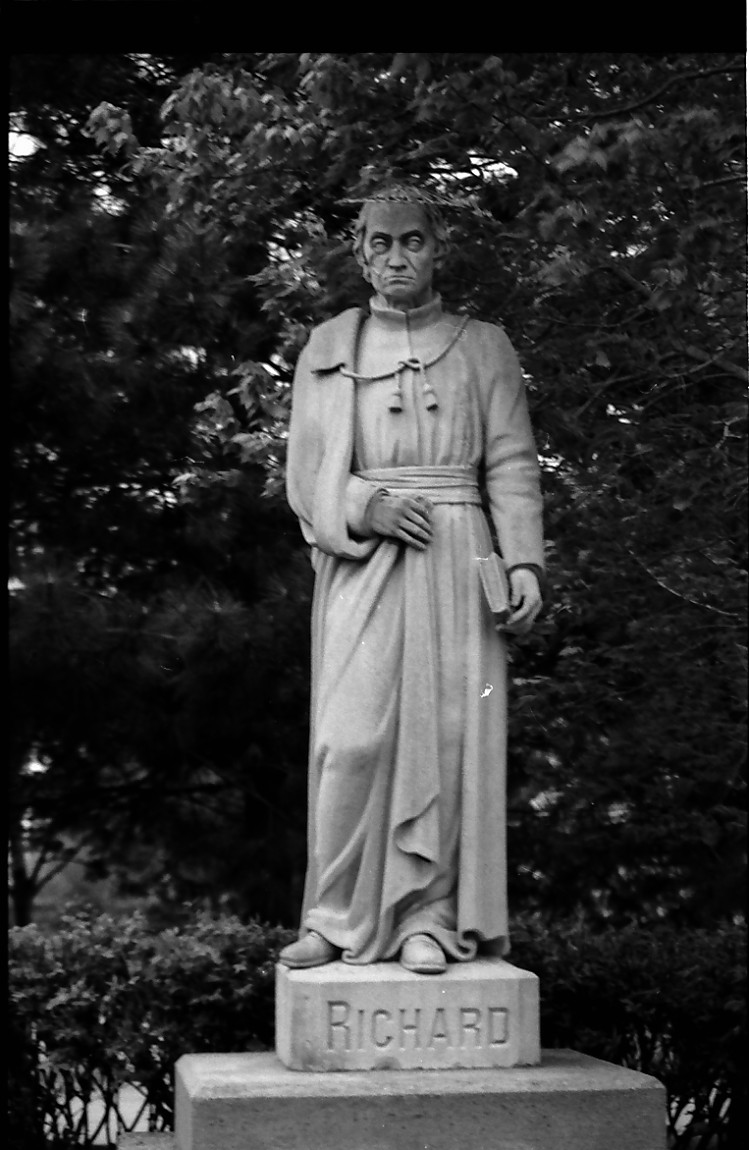
Richard
