= West Village, Detroit =

- West Village Historic District
- U.S. National Register of Historic Places
- U.S. Historic district
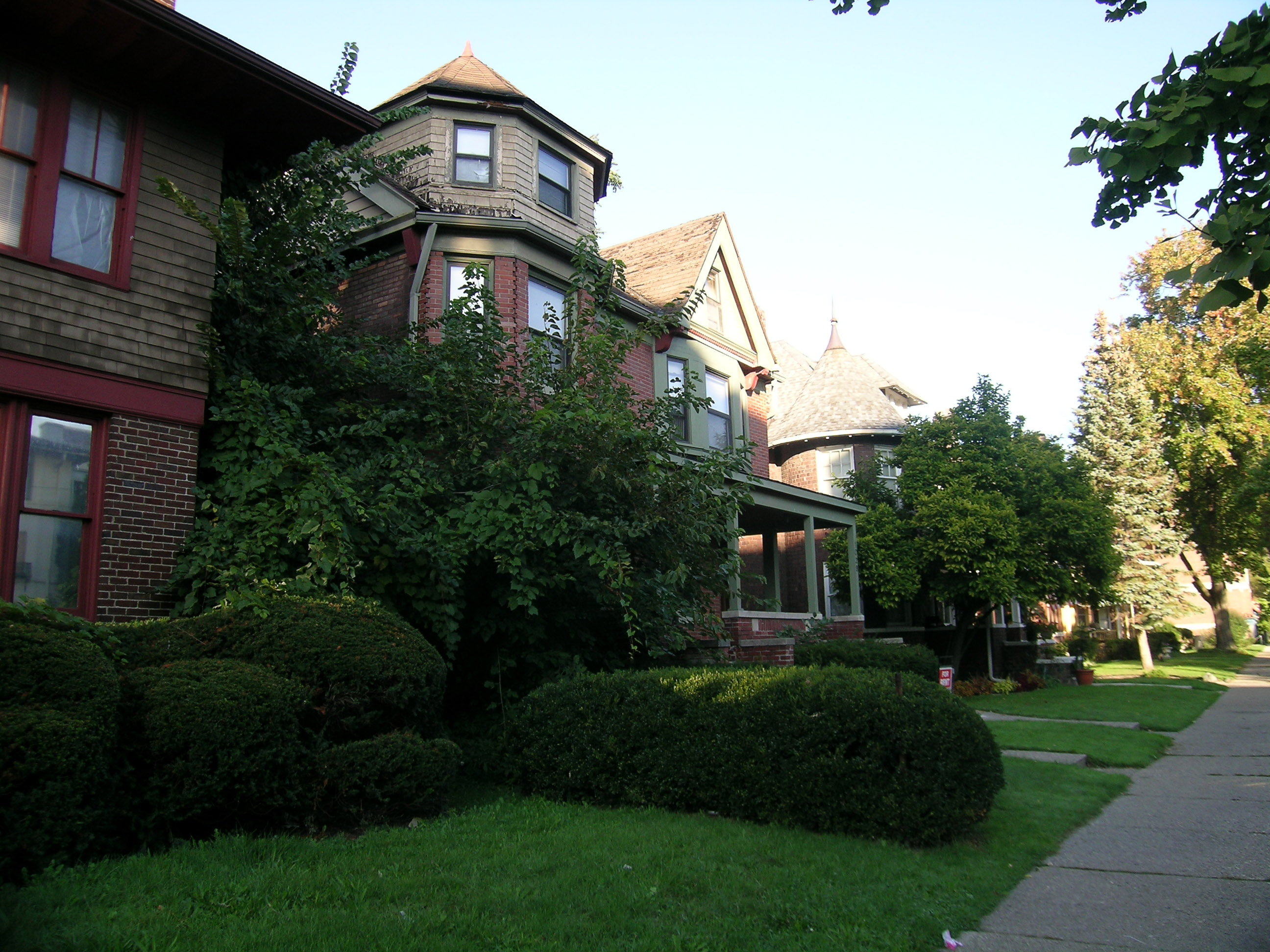
- Streetscape in West Village
- Interactive map
- Location: Detroit, Michigan; United States
- Coordinates: 42°21′16″N 82°59′53″W
- Architectural style: Colonial Revival, Prairie School, Queen Anne
- NRHP reference No.: 80001930
- Added to NRHP: October 14, 1980

West Village is a neighborhood located in Detroit, Michigan, bounded by Jefferson, Kercheval, Parker, and Seyburn Avenues. Adjacent to the west is the Islandview neighborhood, and adjacent to the east is Indian Village. The district received its name in the mid-20th century because of its location just west of the more well-known Indian Village Historic District. It was listed on the National Register of Historic Places in 1980.

== Description ==
West Village is a primarily residential neighborhood containing 275 single and two-family houses, thirty apartment buildings, and about twenty commercial structures spread over 20 square blocks. The neighborhood is platted in an irregular grid, and includes a number of service alleys and short, narrow cross streets. Buildings are uniformly set back from the curb, and a great number of architectural styles are represented, including frame Queen Anne houses, and Tudor, Colonial Revival, and Mediterranean Revival houses as well as Georgian Revival and Jacobean apartment buildings.

== History ==
The areas adjacent to Jefferson Avenue were one of the most exclusive residential addresses in turn-of-the-century Detroit. When the area that is now West Village was platted around that time, the incorporation of restrictions regarding structure cost, use, setback, and height ensured that this area too would be popular. Between 1905 and 1925, the neighborhood rapidly filled with upper-middle-class homes, apartment buildings, and row houses. The neighborhood was home to a number of prominent Detroiters including Franz C. Kuhn, Chief Justice of the Michigan Supreme Court, Edwin C. Denby, Secretary of the Navy, Theodore Hinchman, president of the architectural firm of Smith, Hinchman and Grylls, and sculptor Julius Melchers. As in many Detroit neighborhoods, the racial tensions, red lining, and white exodus to the suburbs following World War II led to a decline of the neighborhood. However, the resurgence of nearby Indian Village in the 1970s created a resurgence in interest in the neighborhood. The West Village Association, a neighborhood association, was formed in 1974.
