= Saint Andrew's Memorial Episcopal Church =

Historic church in Michigan, United States

- U.S. National Register of Historic Places
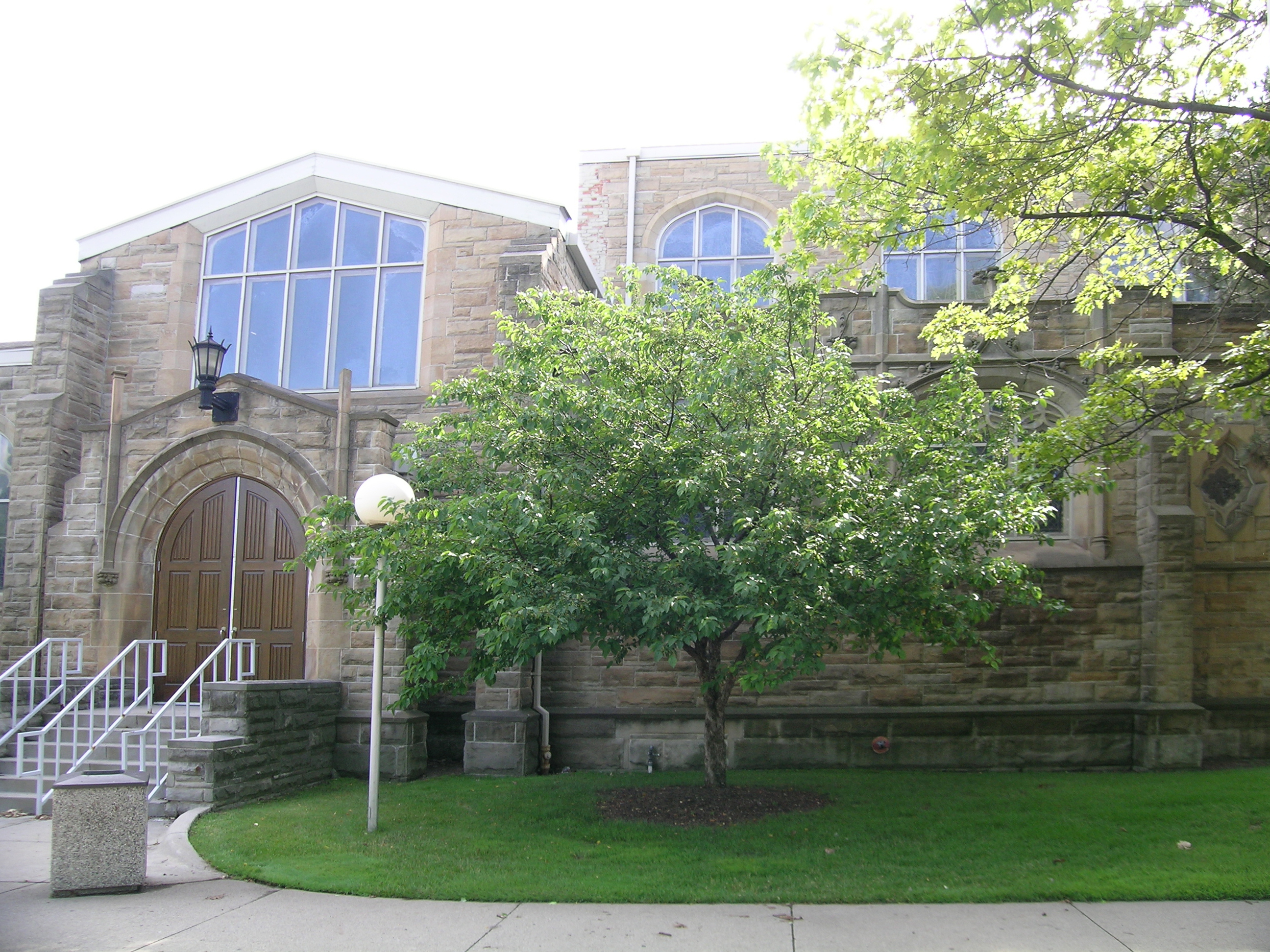
- Interactive map
- Location: 918 Ludington Mall; Detroit, Michigan
- Coordinates: 42°21′20″N 83°4′24″W
- Built: 1894
- Architect: Cram, Wentworth & Goodhue
- Architectural style: Late Gothic Revival
- MPS: University–Cultural Center Phase II MRA
- NRHP reference No.: 86001003
- Added to NRHP: May 15, 1986

Saint Andrew's Memorial Episcopal Church is a historic church located in Detroit, Michigan. As of 2008, it is used by Wayne State University and referred to as St. Andrew's Hall. The church was listed on the National Register of Historic Places in 1986.

== History ==
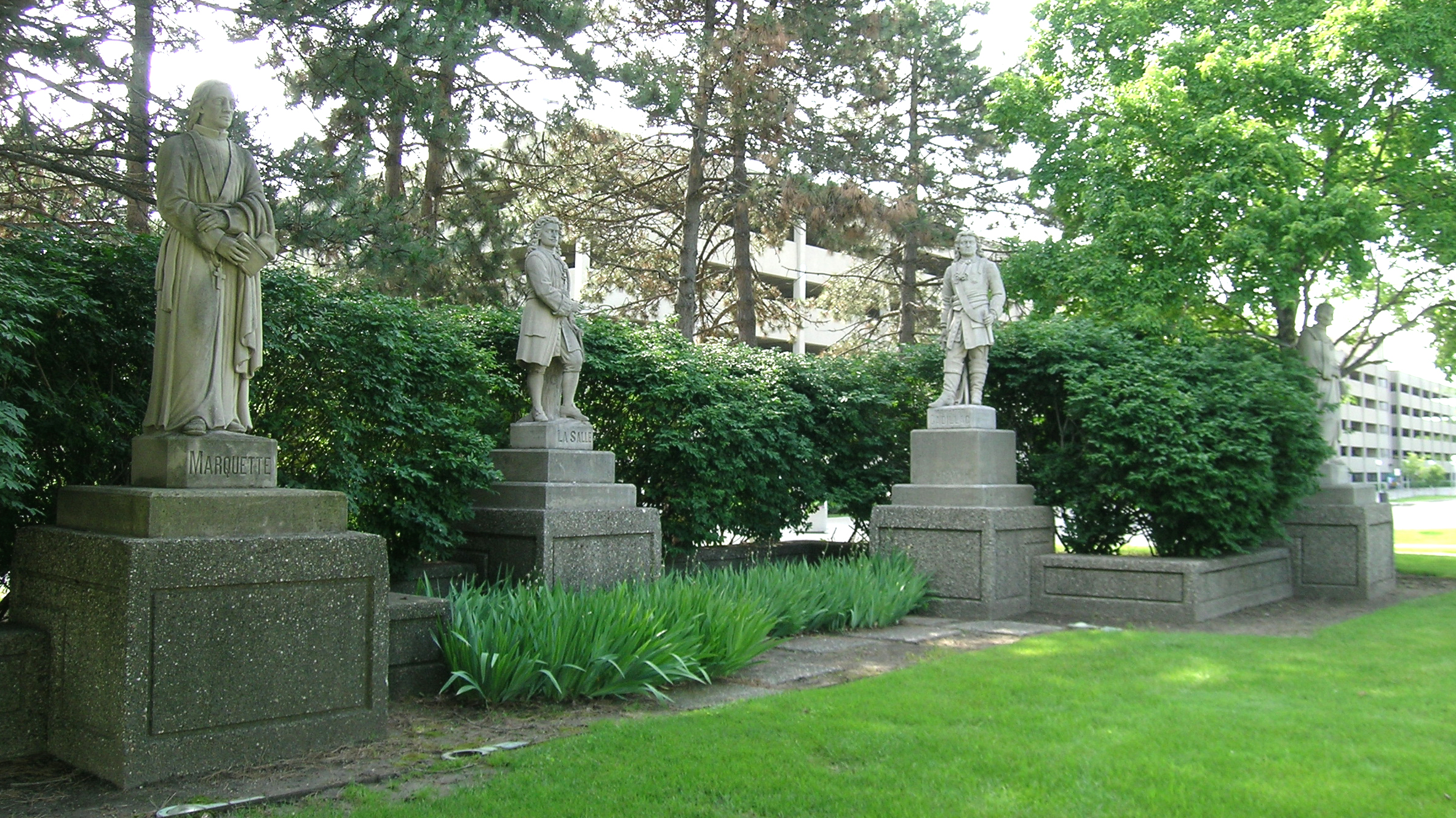
Statues in front of St. Andrews, sculpted by Julius Theodore Melchers

St. Andrew's parish, founded in 1885, was one of the earliest religious institutions established in what is now the University–Cultural Center section of Detroit. By January 1886, the parish had constructed a church at the corner of fourth and Putnam. In the early 1890s, plans for the present church were drawn up in by the Boston-based architectural firm of Cram, Wentworth & Goodhue. There was some delay in construction, but the church was completed in 1902.

In 1906, the church burned due to an electrical fire; it was repaired six years later, although the reconstruction did not restore the original design and has been criticized as architecturally disfiguring. It served the Episcopalian parish for a number of years until, after World War II, the surrounding population began an exodus to the suburbs. In 1961, the diocese leased the building to Wayne State University for 99 years. The University uses it as a student chapel and a concert hall.

== Description ==
St. Andrew's displays the straight, vertical and horizontal lines characteristic of Ralph Adams Cram's work. The exterior is constructed of Bedford limestone, with Berea sandstone trimmings and minimal decorative stonework. Rows of massive columns grace the nave, and an enormous window is inset behind the altar.
