= Calhoun Apartments =

- The Calhoun Apartments
- U.S. National Register of Historic Places
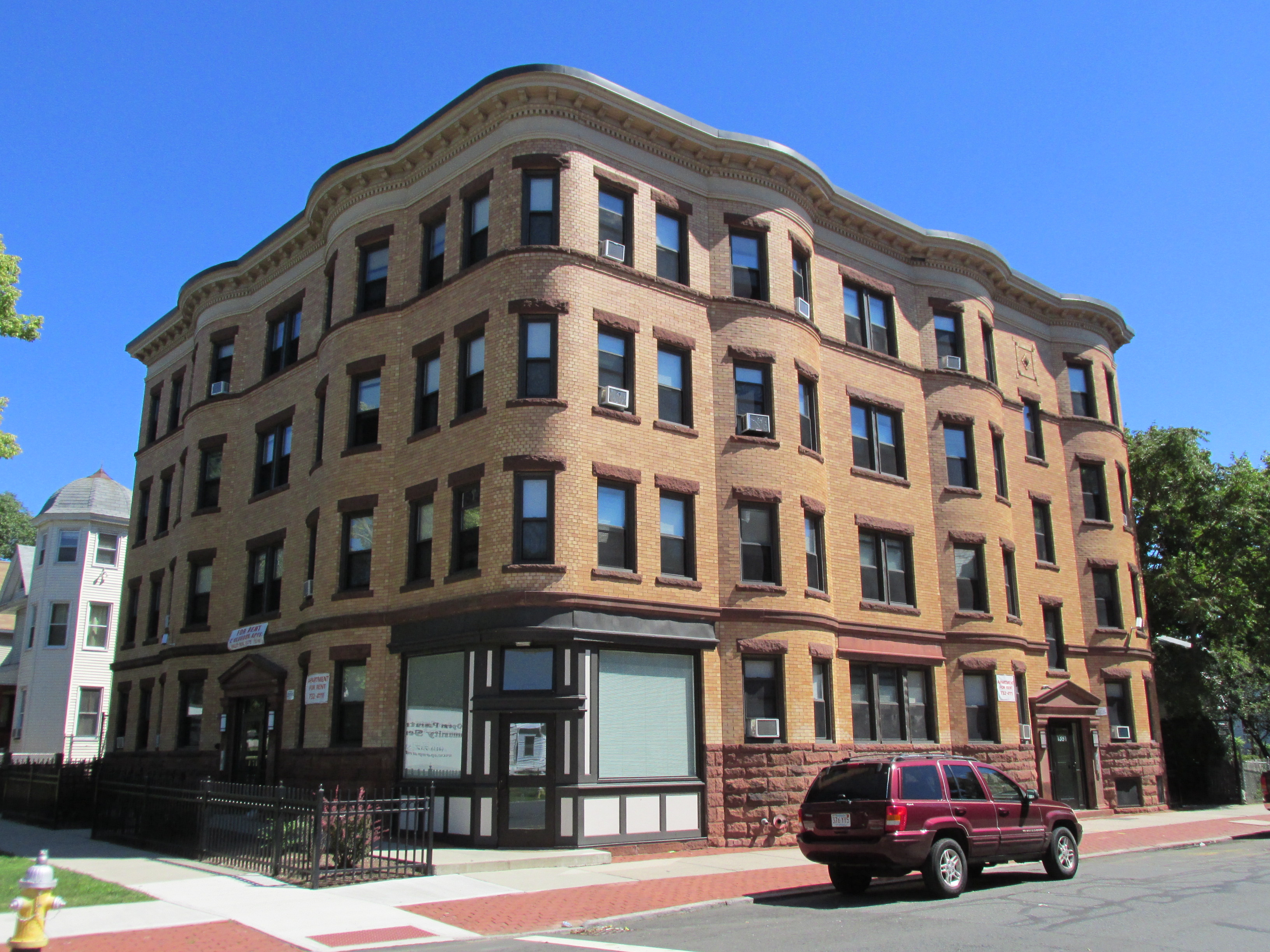

- Location within Massachusetts Location within the United States
- Location: 1391-1399 Dwight St. & 85 Jefferson Ave., Springfield, Massachusetts
- Coordinates: 42°6′58″N 72°36′14″W
- Area: less than one acre
- Built: 1914
- Built by: Home Realty Trust
- Architect: James D. Long
- Architectural style: Classical Revival
- NRHP reference No.: 09000881
- Added to NRHP: November 5, 2009

The Calhoun Apartments are a large multiunit residential building at the corner of Dwight and Jefferson Streets in the North End of Springfield, Massachusetts. The four-story apartment house was built in 1914 for Home Realty Trust and designed by local architect James D. Long in the Classical Revival style. The exterior is built from yellow brick with brownstone trim and features alternating flat and rounded sections on both of its street-facing elevations. The building was completed not long before a new fire code was introduced in Springfield, which in part resulted in more buildings of its type being built. The building went through a rapid succession of owners until the early 1960s, after which it changed hands infrequently.

The Calhoun's resident population underwent changes that echoed Springfield's changing demographics. Its early tenants were almost all working class: teachers, retail store clerks, and factory workers, from a variety of ethnic backgrounds. However, a few small business owners also lived there. By the 1980s Springfield's North End had the highest proportion of substandard housing, and The Calhoun was included in major urban redevelopment plans, along with the nearby Verona Apartments. The Springfield Redevelopment Authority bought an ownership stake in the building and began rehabilitation work in 1983. The interior renovations done pursuant to the redevelopment plan destroyed all historic value inside the building, gutting it and replacing the interior with modern construction. Woodwork around its exterior entrances was also lost.

The Calhoun and Verona were then transferred to Dwight Manor Associates, whose principals included individuals who had overseen the rehabilitation. Property taxes fell into arrears in 1997, and the city took the two properties by tax foreclosure in 2004. In 2006 the city transferred them to the Jefferson Park Limited Partnership for use as low- and moderate-income housing.

== See also ==
- National Register of Historic Places listings in Springfield, Massachusetts
- National Register of Historic Places listings in Hampden County, Massachusetts
