= Chatsworth Apartments =

Historic building in Detroit, Michigan, US

- Chatsworth Suites
- U.S. National Register of Historic Places
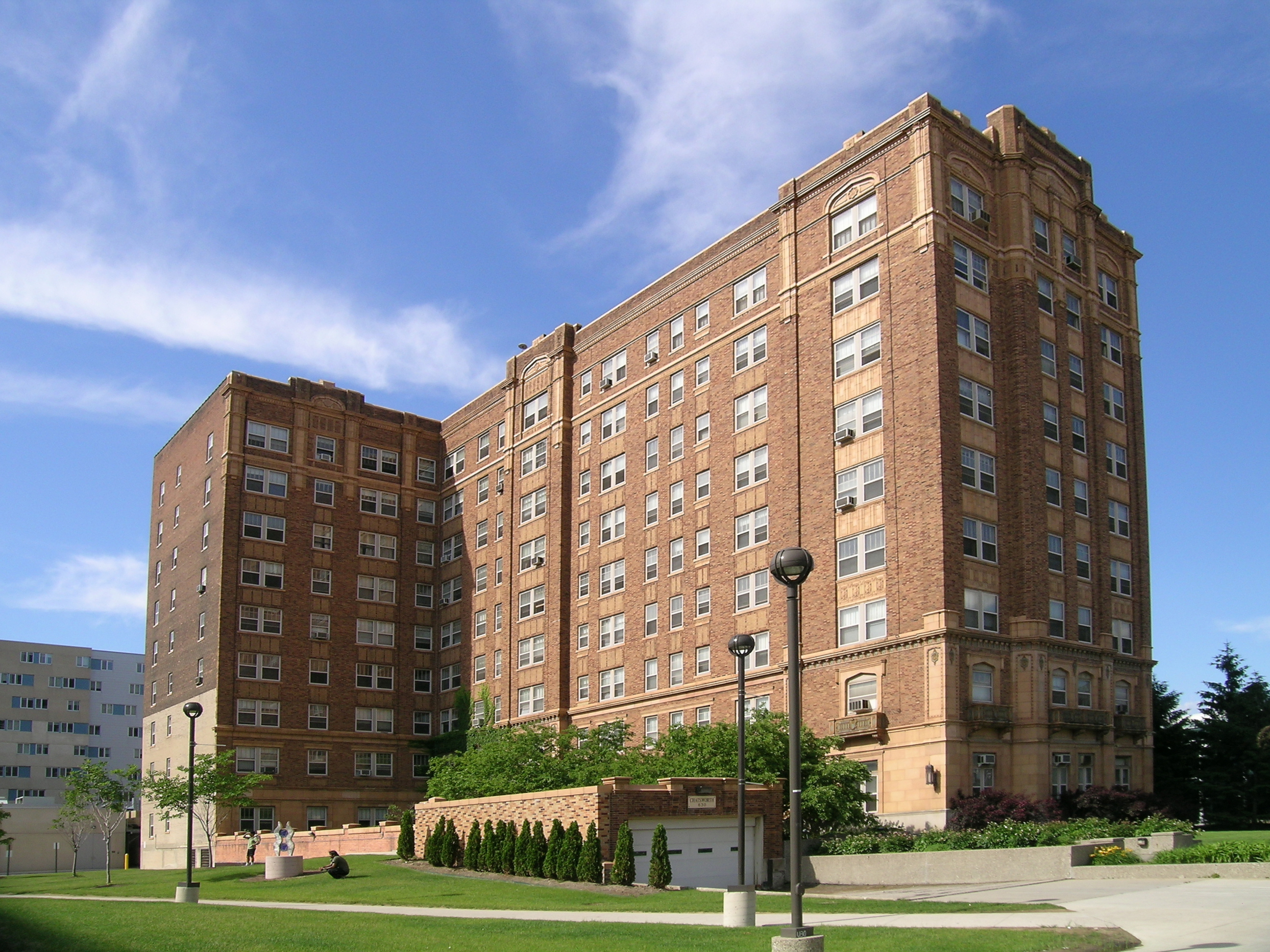
- Interactive map
- Location: 630 Merrick Street; Detroit, Michigan
- Coordinates: 42°21′27″N 83°4′16″W
- Built: 1928
- Architect: Pollmar, Ropes & Lundy
- Architectural style: Late 19th And 20th Century Revivals
- MPS: University–Cultural Center Phase II MRA
- NRHP reference No.: 86001001
- Added to NRHP: May 1, 1986

The Chatsworth Suites is a dormitory located in Midtown Detroit, Michigan, within the campus of Wayne State University. It was listed on the National Register of Historic Places in 1986.

== Description ==
The Chatsworth Suites is a nine-story, L-shaped apartment building, built of reinforced concrete with tan-colored brick and tile. It included an underground parking garage with a sixty-five car capacity – an uncommon feature at the time.

The facade of the Chatsworth is divided into three horizontal sections: a heavier base consisting of the first two floors, a center section of floors 3–8, and the capping of the ninth floor. The first two floors are designed with decorative elements, including white stone at the ground level, orangish tiles, balustrades on the second-story windows, and a clearly defined bracketed cornice above the second floor. The main facade includes three strong vertical bays in the main section (floors 3–8) which stand out as columns. Gothic-shaped arches top the ninth-story windows, as well as the second-story windows.

Currently, the inside of the building is split into several suite style rooms per a floor, with students having a small personal room, a shared living space, and a restroom.

== History ==
The Chatsworth was built in 1928 for the realty company T.F. Norris Company from a design by the firm of Pollmar, Ropes & Lundy. The apartment building was constructed at a cost of approximately $560,000 to accommodate the influx of residents into Detroit in the 1920s. The original owner was likely Charles A. Gallarno – he certainly owned the land on which the Chatsworth was built, and owned some nearby apartment buildings, but his ownership of the Chatsworth is uncertain.

In 1943, Bondholders Management Inc. acquired the property. As early as 1951, Wayne State University expressed an interest in purchasing the Chatsworth. The university did acquire it in February 1961.

The university formerly allowed families with children to live in Chatsworth Tower.

In 2018 the university began a remodeling of Chatsworth, completely removing the original rooms and replacing them with suite style dormitories. This change was met with pushback from the residents, who expressed concern that the university was asking them to move out within hours of taking their last finals that year. As of 2021 Chatsworth reopened as a suite style dormitory for primarily undergraduate students.
