= Santa Fe Apartments =

- Formerly listed on the U.S. National Register of Historic Places
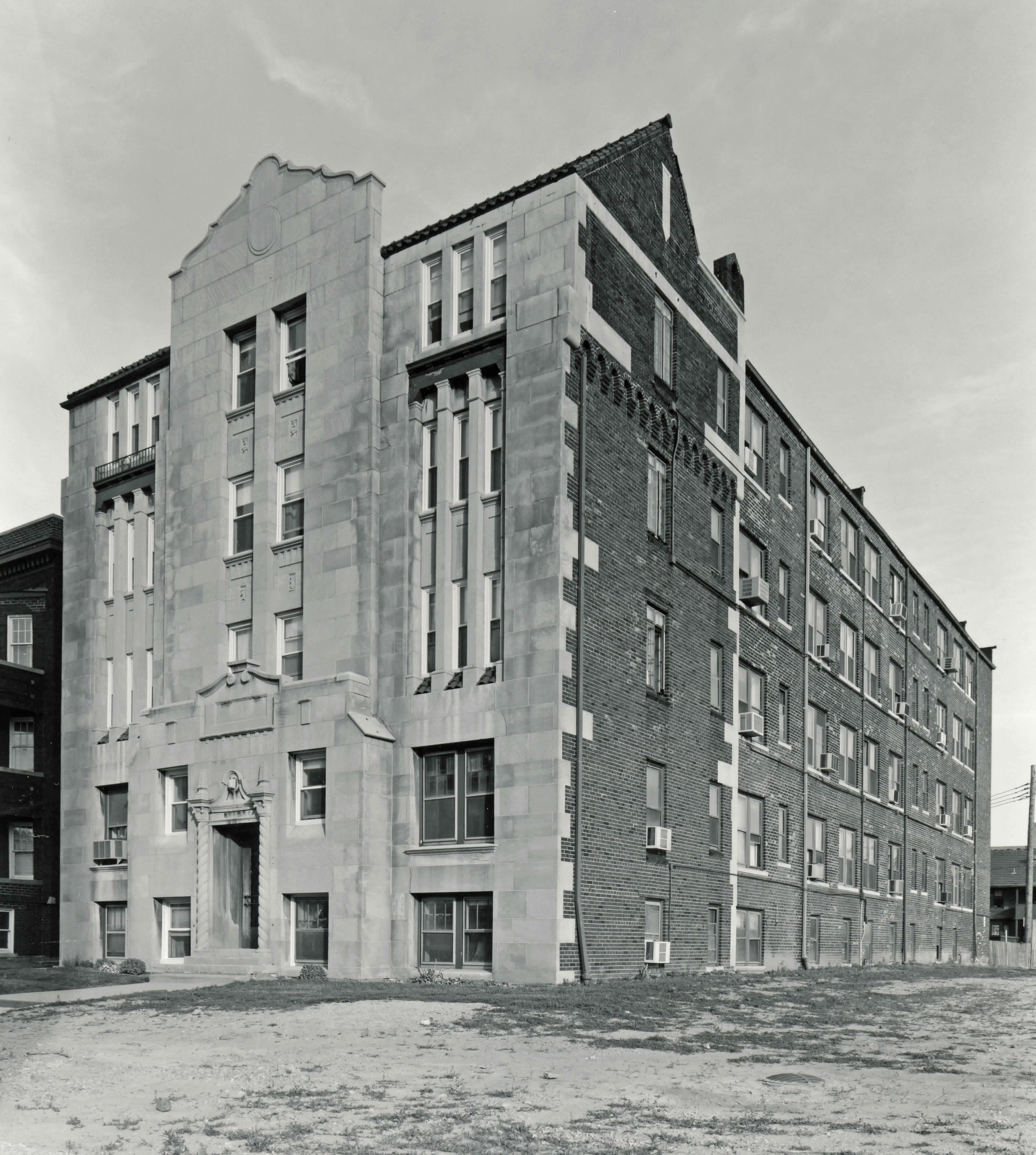
- Santa Fe Apartments, 1985
- Interactive map
- Location: 681 Merrick Street; Detroit, Michigan
- Coordinates: 42°21′24″N 83°4′19″W
- Built: 1925
- Architect: F. William Wiedmaier, John B. Gay
- Architectural style: Mission/Spanish Revival
- Demolished: 1996
- MPS: University–Cultural Center Phase II MRA
- NRHP reference No.: 86000996

Significant dates
- Added to NRHP: May 1, 1986
- Removed from NRHP: October 17, 2022

The Santa Fe Apartments were an apartment building located in Detroit, Michigan. The building was listed on the National Register of Historic Places in 1986 and subsequently demolished by Wayne State University and removed from the National Register of Historic Places in 2022. The site is now the location of the Yousif B. Ghafari Hall.

== History and significance ==
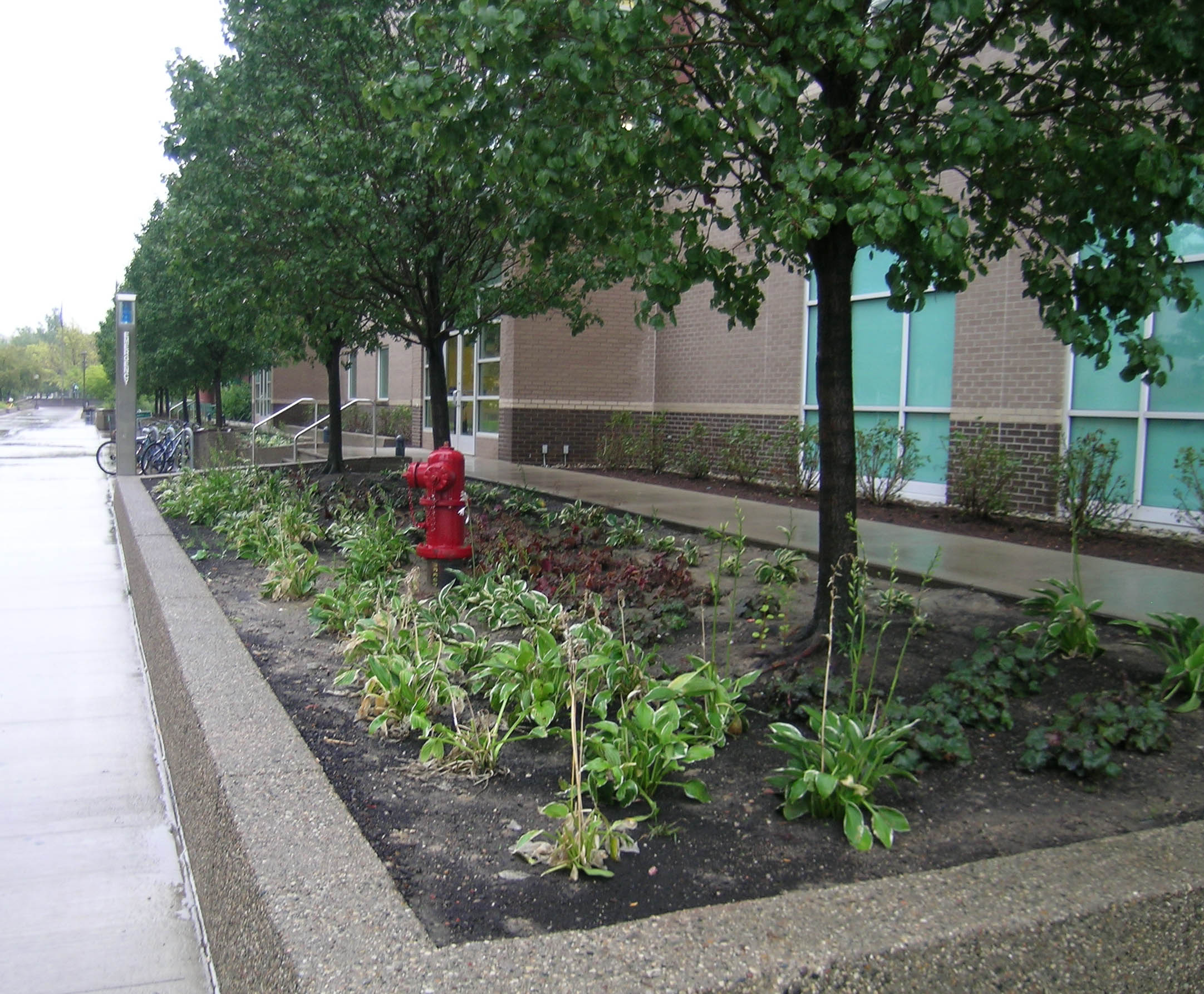
Location of former Santa Fe Apartments

The Santa Fe was built in 1925 for $95,000. The building was a fine example of Mission and Spanish Revival; this style was used frequently for homes and religious buildings, but its use in a multi-unit dwelling is rare. The building was designed by architects F. William Wiedmaier and John B. Gay, and built by Harry Dunitz. The apartment building was purchased by Wayne State University in the 1950s, and was used for student housing until its demolition in 1996.

== Description ==
The Santa Fe Apartments were a five-story apartment building, measuring 45 feet by 122 feet, built of brick, tile, and grey stone, with plentiful architectural details on the front façade. It had a predominantly flat roof, but with a prominent gable at the front. Vertical elements on the façade were created by rectangular columns and tall, narrow windows on the upper floors. The exterior also featured dentil moldings, a broken scroll pediment above the second level, and decorative railings. The sides were quoined and decorative brick and tile work graced the chimneys. The entryway was flanked on each side by a spiral column with classical type carvings just below the capital.

Both Mission and Spanish Revival architecture usually receive a stucco treatment. However, the Santa Fe Apartments were faced with grey stone tiles with thin mortar joints in between. The roof was formed with a distinctive Mission style parapet, and the gable roof at the front was covered with red barrel tiles. The building had 38 apartments.
