= Marcus Burrowes =

American architect

Marcus R. Burrowes FAIA (1874–1953) was a notable Detroit architect. He served one year in the position of president of the Michigan Society of Architects and was a fellow of the American Institute of Architects (AIA). He was widely known in southeast Michigan, especially during the second and third decades of the twentieth century, for his recreation of English Revival style buildings.

== Biography ==
Burrowes was born in Tonawanda, New York, near Buffalo. Burrowes attended the Denver Art Academy, where he attended lectures and received instruction by architects of note, as well as serving an apprenticeship to a leading architectural firm in Denver. In the 1890s, Burrowes work took him to Canada, where he was employed in the chief architects office of the Dominion at Ottawa, specializing in post office buildings. From Canada, he crossed the Detroit River to Detroit, a place suitable for an entrepreneurial architect like Burrowes.

Initially, Burrowes worked in the offices of Albert Kahn. In 1907, he joined the firm of Stratton and Baldwin for two years, which put him into contact with leading figures in the Arts and Crafts movement in Detroit, including Kahn, William B. Stratton, Frank C. Baldwin, and George Gough Booth. Through Stratton's connections with Mary Chase Perry Stratton of Pewabic Pottery, Burrowes gained exposure to this important Detroit-based firm as well.

However, deciding his future was to be in independent practice, Burrowes formed the firm of Burrowes and Wells with Dalton R. Wells. By 1914, Burrowes was operating under his own name. In 1920 he joined with Frank Eurich, who had received training in the architecture program from Cornell University. Together, Burrowes and Eurich designed many homes in Grosse Pointe and Detroit, as well as several libraries and municipal buildings.

During his lifetime, Burrowes was recognized by his fellow architects. He served as president of the Detroit Chapter of the American Institute of Architects in 1916 and 1917; vice-president of the Detroit Chapter in 1923, and secretary from 1911 to 1915. He served as president of the Michigan Society of Architects in 1923 and 1924. In 1940, he was made a Fellow of the American Institute of Architects and became emeritus in 1952. He was a member of the Episcopal Church and the Detroit Athletic Club.

Burrowes died at the age of 79 at his home in London, Ontario, which he had retired to eight months previous. His obituary in the Detroit Free Press in 1953, stated how "he designed more than 1,000 structures in and near Detroit during his long career."

== Selected commissions ==
Sortable table
Name	City	State/Country	Year Designed	Built	Other Information	Image
Hiram Walker and Sons, Customs Office Building	Walkerville	Ontario, Canada	1910		(Burrowes and Wells)	
Cranbrook Service Quarters, Garages	Bloomfield Hills	Michigan	1911			
H.R. Dingwell Home	Walkerville	Ontario, Canada	1912		Devonshire Road	
Hiram Walker Home	Walkerville	Ontario, Canada	1912		Devonshire Road	
Cranbrook Greek Theatre	Bloomfield Hills	Michigan	1915-1916			
Warren Booth Home	Bloomfield Hills	Michigan			Lone Pine Road	
Grace Booth Wallace Home						
Brookside School	Bloomfield Hills	Michigan			Evergreen Road(with Henry Scripps Booth)	
W.G. Morley House	Bloomfield Hills	Michigan			Lone Pine Road	
David A. Brown House	Detroit	Michigan			East Boston Boulevard	
C.B. Tuttle House	Detroit	Michigan			Hamilton Drive	
Victor F. Dewey House	Detroit	Michigan			Hamilton Drive	
A.L. McCarthy House	Detroit	Michigan			Hamilton Drive	
William Locke House	Detroit	Michigan			Hamilton Drive	
Percy A. Barnard House	Detroit	Michigan			Fairway Drive	
Warren Booth Home	Detroit	Michigan	1922		2950 Iroquois	
Henry L. Pierson, Sr. House	Detroit	Michigan	1915		2530 Iroquois	
Mrs. Walter Jennings' Home	Detroit	Michigan			2455 Iroquois	
Herman Strasburg House	Detroit	Michigan	1915		5415 Cass	
2243 Iroquois	Detroit	Michigan	1917			
Newton Annis Home	Detroit	Michigan			2168 Burns	
1432 Burns	Detroit	Michigan				
Miss Jeannette McMillan Liggett Home	Detroit	Michigan			2501 Burns	
S. Kemp Pittman, Sr. Home	Detroit	Michigan	1912		1782 Seminole	
2454 Seminole	Detroit	Michigan				
Paul Gray House	Detroit	Michigan	1910		1710 Seminole	
Ralph Harmon Booth Home	Grosse Pointe	Michigan	1924		315 Washington	
Berrien C. Eaton Home	Grosse Pointe	Michigan			Bishop Road	
Edward S. Caulkins Home	Grosse Pointe	Michigan			Hendrie Lane	
H. Robert Stoepel Home	Grosse Pointe	Michigan				
L.T. Bulkley Home	Grosse Pointe	Michigan			Edgemont Park	
Charles B. Crouse Home, Cadieux and Maumee	Grosse Pointe	Michigan				
Edward G. Burlage Home	Grosse Pointe	Michigan			Harvard Road	
Henry T. Cole Home	Grosse Pointe	Michigan			Lakeland	
Addition to Palmer Sherman House	Farmington	Michigan			Farmington Road	
Burbrook	Farmington	Michigan	1924		residence of Marcus R. Burrowes, 24300 Locust Drive	Burbrook, Farmington Hills, Michigan
David Gray House	Farmington Hills	Michigan			in present-day Heritage Park	Gray-Spicer House, Farmington Hills, Michigan
Windy Hill	Farmington	Michigan			Kirby White House, Eleven Mile Road	
Cottage, Biddestone Woods estate	Farmington	Michigan	1937			
C.W. Hubbell	Milford	Michigan	1923	1937		
Wayne County Training School	Northville Township	Michigan	1923			
Jacob Seigel House	Detroit	Michigan	1917	1918	51 W Boston blvd	

Libraries

- Gabriel Richard Library, Stoepel and Grand River, Detroit
- Redford Village Hall (Redford Library), Six Mile and Grand River, 1928
- Duffield Branch of the Detroit Public Library, 2507 West Grand Boulevard and Dunelin
- Francis Parkman Branch of the Detroit Public Library, 1726 Oakman, Blvd, Detroit, 1931
- McGregor Library, Woodward Avenue, Highland Park (Local associated architects. Building designed by Tilton & Githens of New York)

Schools and Civic Complexes

- Wayne County Training School, near Northville
- Barber School, Highland Park
- Highland Park Athletic Fieldhouse, Highland Park
- Grosse Pointe High School, Grosse Pointe Farms
- Grosse Pointe Cottage School, Grosse Pointe
- Grosse Pointe Hunt Club Clubhouse, Grosse Pointe
- Grosse Pointe Golf Clubhouse, Grosse Pointe
- Peoples' State Bank, Detroit
- Remodeling of Greenmeade, Eight Mile Road, Livonia
- Grand Lawn Cemetery entrance, Grand River just east of Telegraph Road
- Methodist Children's Village, Six Mile Road, Redford
- YMCA, Highland Park
- YWCA, Highland Park
- Grosse Pointe Municipal Building
- Springwells Town Hall, later Dearborn City Hall
- Birmingham Civic Complex, Birmingham, 1921–1922

Starr Commonwealth, outside Albion, Michigan

Design of 11 buildings and campus landscape plan

- Newton Hall, Starr Commonwealth, 1915
- Emily Jewell Clark Building, Starr Commonwealth, 1917
- Wilcox Cottage, Starr Commonwealth
- Hillside, later Payne Family Cottage, Starr Commonwealth, 1920
- Webster Hall, Starr Commonwealth, 1934
- Inglis-Mendelssohn Cottage, Starr Commonwealth
- Chapel in the Woods, Starr Commonwealth, 1949
- Breuckner Museum and Art Gallery, Starr Commonwealth, 1952
- Designs for Candler Hall, Kresge Cottage, Norton Family Cottage, Starr Commonwealth - all built after Burrowes death
