= Verona Apartments (Springfield, Massachusetts) =

- The Verona Apartments
- U.S. National Register of Historic Places
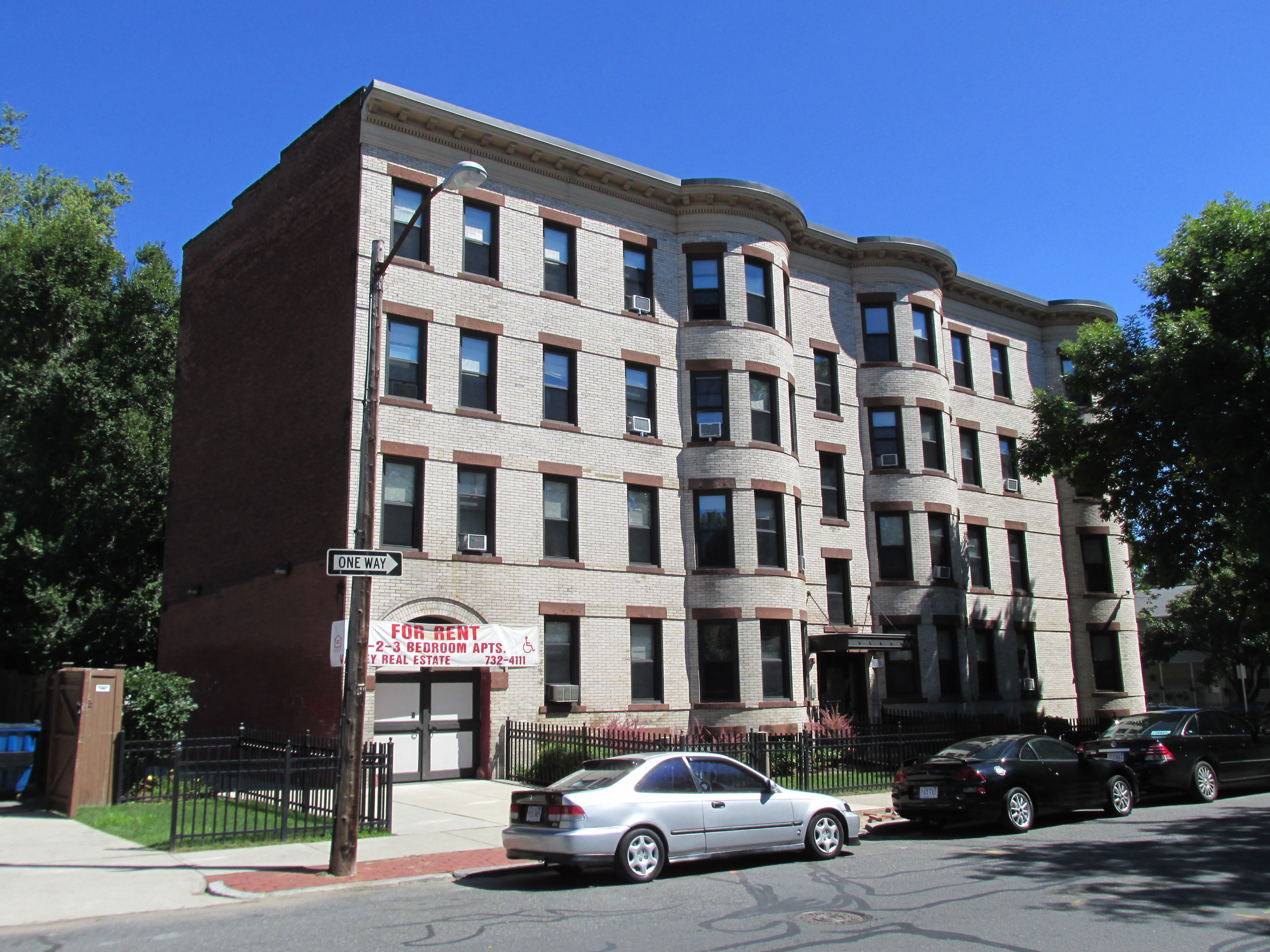

- Location within Massachusetts Location within the United States
- Location: 1245-1255 Dwight St. & 6-10 Allendale St., Springfield, Massachusetts
- Coordinates: 42°6′53″N 72°36′9″W
- Area: less than one acre
- Built: 1906
- Architect: Ranger, Casper; Prew, John
- Architectural style: Classical Revival
- NRHP reference No.: 09000882
- Added to NRHP: November 5, 2009

The Verona Apartments is a significant multiunit residential building situated at the corner of Dwight and Allendale Streets in the North End of Springfield, Massachusetts. The four-story apartment house, constructed in 1906 in the Classical Revival style by a consortium of construction and real estate interests, is characterized by white brick exterior with alternating flat and rounded sections on both street-facing elevations.

The Verona's resident population witnessed changes reflecting Springfield's evolving demographics. Initially occupied by a predominantly working-class community, including teachers, retail store clerks, and factory workers from diverse ethnic backgrounds, the building also housed a few small business owners. However, by the 1980s, Springfield's North End had the highest proportion of substandard housing. The Verona, along with the nearby Calhoun Apartments, became part of major urban redevelopment plans. In 1983, The Verona was acquired by Housing Rehab, Inc., which initiated rehabilitation work in 1983. Unfortunately, the interior renovations carried out as part of the redevelopment plan resulted in the loss of all historic value inside the building, as it was gutted and replaced with modern construction. Exterior woodwork around entrances was also lost.

Subsequently, The Verona and Calhoun were transferred to Dwight Manor Associates, whose principals included individuals overseeing the rehabilitation. In 1997, property taxes fell into arrears, leading to the city's tax foreclosure on both properties in 2004. In 2006, the city transferred them to the Jefferson Park Limited Partnership for use as low and moderate-income housing.

== See also ==
- National Register of Historic Places listings in Springfield, Massachusetts
- National Register of Historic Places listings in Hampden County, Massachusetts
