= Charles Lang Freer House =

Historic house in Michigan, United States

- U.S. National Register of Historic Places
- U.S. Historic district – Contributing property
- Michigan State Historic Site
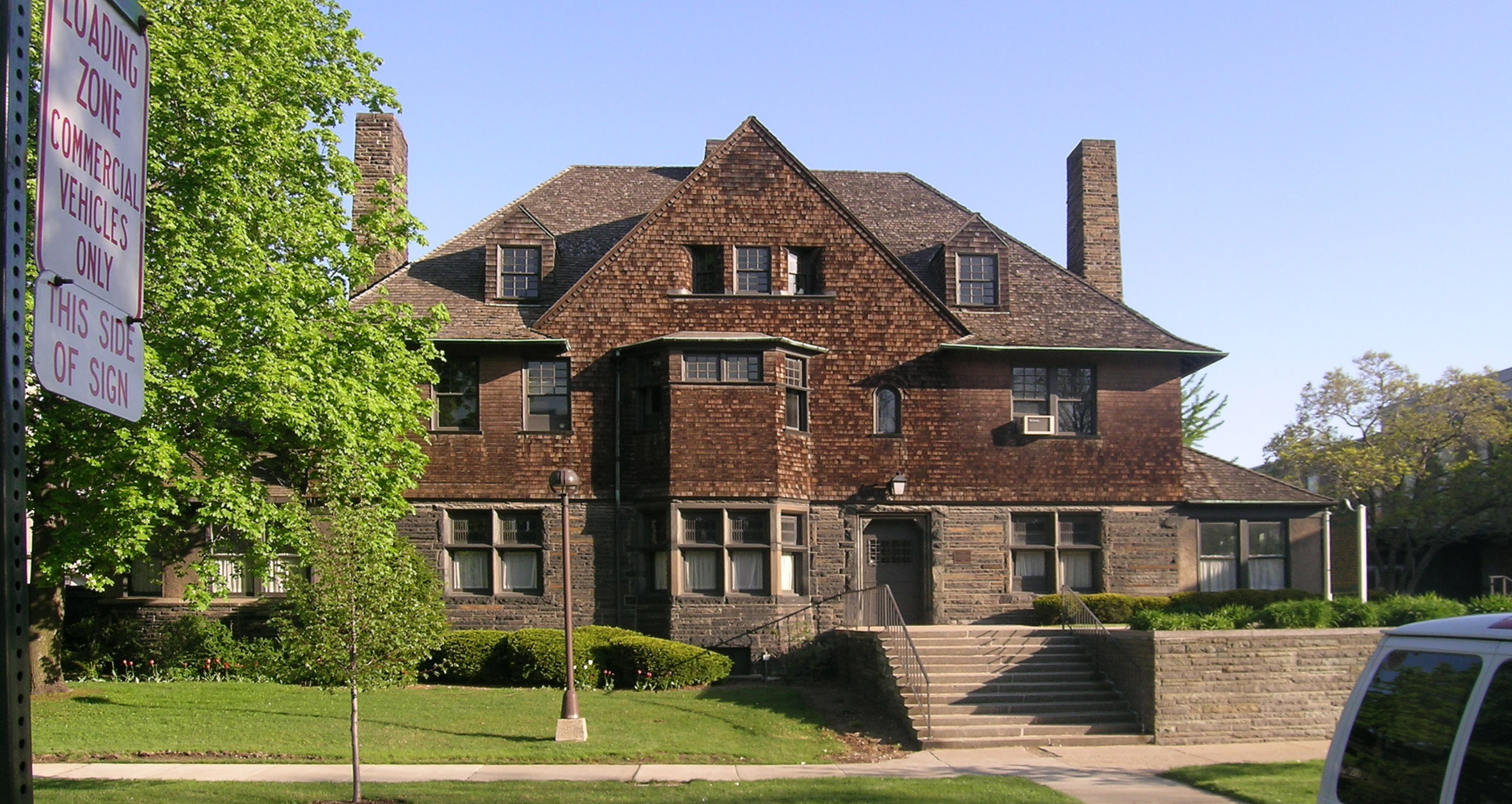
- Interactive map
- Location: 71 East Ferry Street; Detroit, Michigan
- Coordinates: 42°21′43″N 83°3′57″W
- Built: 1892
- Architect: Wilson Eyre
- Architectural style: Shingle style
- Part of: East Ferry Avenue Historic District (ID80001921)
- NRHP reference No.: 71000426

Significant dates
- Added to NRHP: April 16, 1971
- Designated CP: March 10, 1980
- Designated MSHS: November 6, 1970

The Charles Lang Freer House is located at 71 East Ferry Avenue in Detroit, Michigan, USA. The house was originally built for the industrialist and art collector Charles Lang Freer, whose gift of the Freer Gallery of Art began the Smithsonian Institution in Washington, DC. The structure currently hosts the Merrill Palmer Skillman Institute of Child & Family Development of Wayne State University. It was designated a Michigan State Historic Site in 1970 and listed on the National Register of Historic Places in 1971.

== History ==
Charles Lang Freer, in partnership with Col. Frank J. Hecker, made his fortune from the Peninsular Car Company. Freer travelled widely, with one of his favorite spots being Newport, Rhode Island. There, he was favorably impressed by the shingle style summer cottages built by the wealthy. Desiring a similar home, in 1890 Freer contracted with Wilson Eyre to design a home in Detroit. The house, on Ferry Street next door to Hecker's home, was completed in 1892.

== Architecture ==
For the exterior, Eyre used coursed hard blue limestone (now discolored) from New York for the first floor. Dark, closely spaced shingles of Michigan oak cover most of the rest of the façade. On the third story, a triangular gable and various dormers interrupt the roofline. Chimneys dominate the east and west ends of the home, underneath which are porches. These porches were originally open-air, but are currently closed stucco.

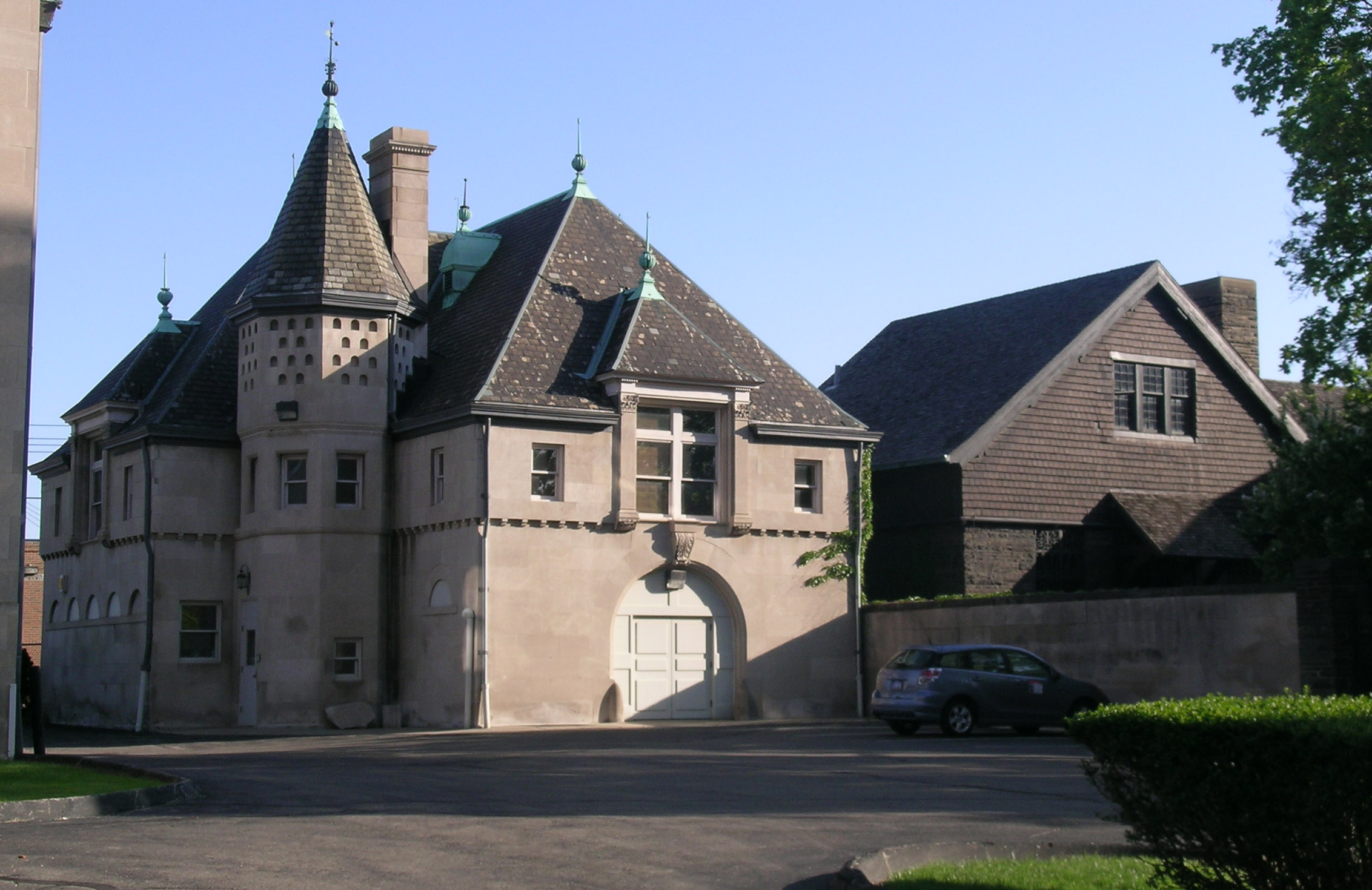
The structure on the right is the carriage house of the Freer House, where The Peacock Room was installed. The structure on the left is the carriage house of the next-door Hecker house.

On the interior, Eyre designed the home with Freer's art collection in mind. (This collection is now in the Smithsonian Institution's Freer Gallery of Art.) There are 22 rooms and 12 fireplaces in the house, as well as an elevator, and numerous balconies, bay windows, enclosed porches, and skylights. In 1906, Eyre designed an art gallery, added above the stable. In 1904, Frederick Leyland's widow sold Freer The Peacock Room, designed by James Whistler, and Freer had Eyre design another room in the carriage house in which to install it.

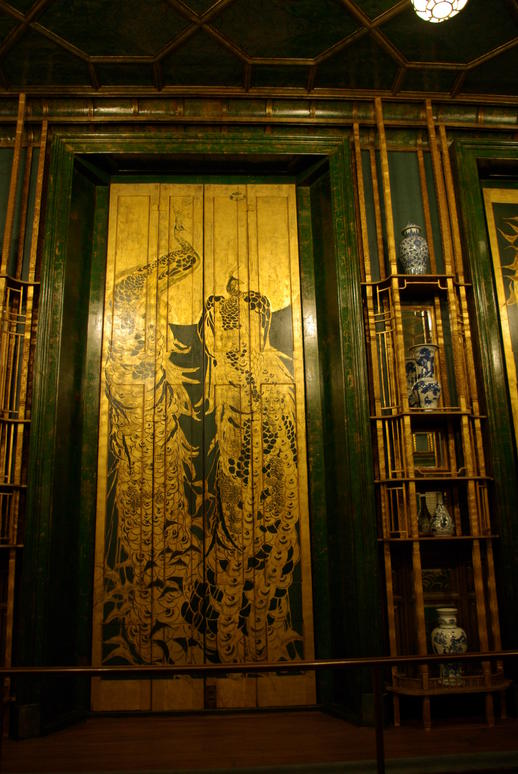
The Peacock Room

== Current use ==
In 1916, Lizzie Pitts Merrill Palmer left a bequest of three million dollars to found a school centering on home and family development. In 1923, the Institute purchased the house, and have remained there since. In 1980, this Institute (currently Merrill Palmer Skillman Institute) was incorporated into Wayne State University. The Institute runs the Early Childhood Center, a preschool for area children age 2 1/2 to 5, and has a research faculty of 12 studying children from infancy to adulthood.
