= East Ferry Avenue Historic District =

Historic district in Michigan, United States

- U.S. National Register of Historic Places
- U.S. Historic district
- Michigan State Historic Site
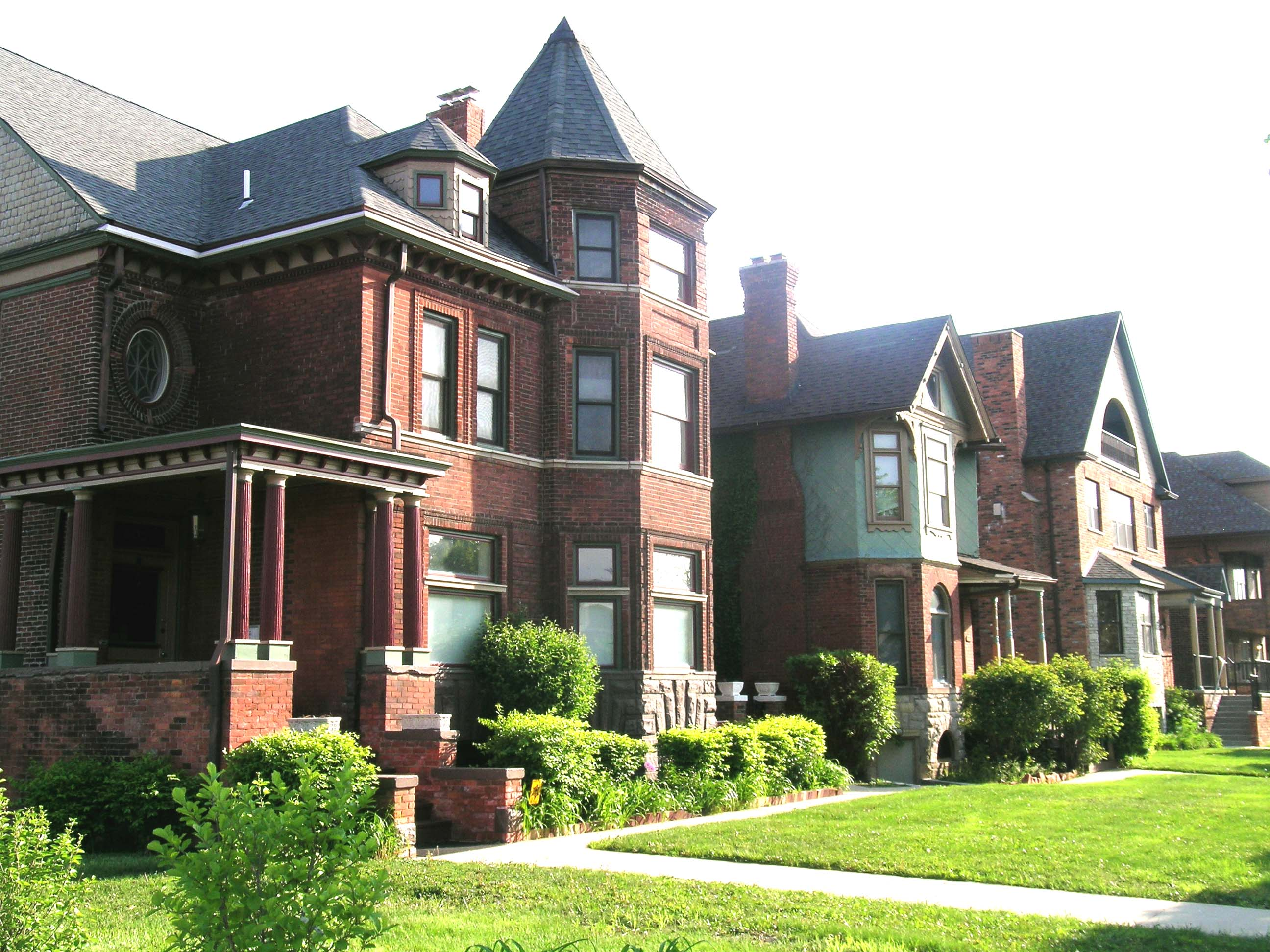
- East Ferry streetscape
- Interactive map
- Location: Detroit, Michigan, U.S.
- Coordinates: 42°21′42″N 83°3′56″W
- Architect: Multiple
- Architectural style: Châteauesque, Colonial Revival, Queen Anne, Romanesque Revival, Shingle
- NRHP reference No.: 80001921

Significant dates
- Added to NRHP: March 10, 1980
- Designated MSHS: December 14, 1976

The East Ferry Avenue Historic District is a historic residential district in Midtown Detroit, Michigan. The nationally designated historic district stretches two blocks from Woodward Avenue east to Brush Street; the locally designated historic district includes a third block between Brush and Beaubien. The district includes the separately designated Col. Frank J. Hecker House and the Charles Lang Freer House. It was designated a Michigan State Historic Site in 1976 and listed on the National Register of Historic Places in 1980.

== History ==
In 1856, the Ferry Seed Company was founded in Detroit; the company established a large farm at the corner of East Ferry and Woodward to grow the seeds that were sold nationwide. (Note: Although no longer in Detroit, the company still exists as the Ferry-Morse Seed Company.) In the mid-1880s, then-owner D. M. Ferry platted the farm into residential lots along East Ferry Avenue. At the time Woodward was an upscale residential street, so lots facing Woodward were quite expensive (as is the Col. Frank J. Hecker House, on Woodward and Ferry). Lots on the side streets were less expensive, and East Ferry was quickly settled by prosperous middle and upper middle class Detroit residents. Prominent early residents of the district include Col. Frank J. Hecker, colonel in the Union Army and founder of the Peninsular Car Company; Charles Lang Freer, Hecker's partner and noted art collector; William A. Pungs, founder of the Anderson Carriage Company; Herman Roehm, co-owner of Roehm and Weston hardware store; John Scott, a prominent architect; and Samuel A. Sloman, of M. Sloman & Co. furrier.

Woodward Avenue since redeveloped into primarily commercial property, but a group of mansions and upscale housing on East Ferry survives. Around World War I, a number of professionals and business people found they could purchase homes on East Ferry. The Omega Psi Phi fraternity and the Lewis College of Business still remain on East Ferry. After World War II, the Merrill Palmer Institute (housed in the Charles Lang Freer House) purchased several homes along East Ferry, hoping to expand their operations. However, Merrill Palmer was unable to expand and in the late 1960s sold the homes to the Detroit Institute of Arts for their proposed expansion. The DIA eventually realized the property on East Ferry would not be useful to them, and re-sold them in the mid-1990s.

Four of these homes were turned into The Inn on Ferry Street, a successful bed and breakfast, others are now residential. Recently, new homes have been constructed in the neighborhood, architecturally congruent with the designs of the 19th century homes already there.

== Architecture ==
Houses on East Ferry are built close together on small lots, set back from the street. Many of the matching carriage houses still exist. In general, the neighborhood consists primarily of Queen Anne homes, built of brick and sandstone, with bay windows or turrets and wide front porches. There are some Romanesque Revival, and Colonial Revival designs. Homes on East Ferry are some of the best current examples of residential commissions from Detroit's leading 19th century architects, including John Scott, Louis Kamper, Malcomson and Higginbotham, Rogers and McFarlane, Mortimer Smith, Donaldson and Meier, Joseph E. Mills, A. E. Harley, and Smith, Hinchman & Grylls.

== Gallery ==
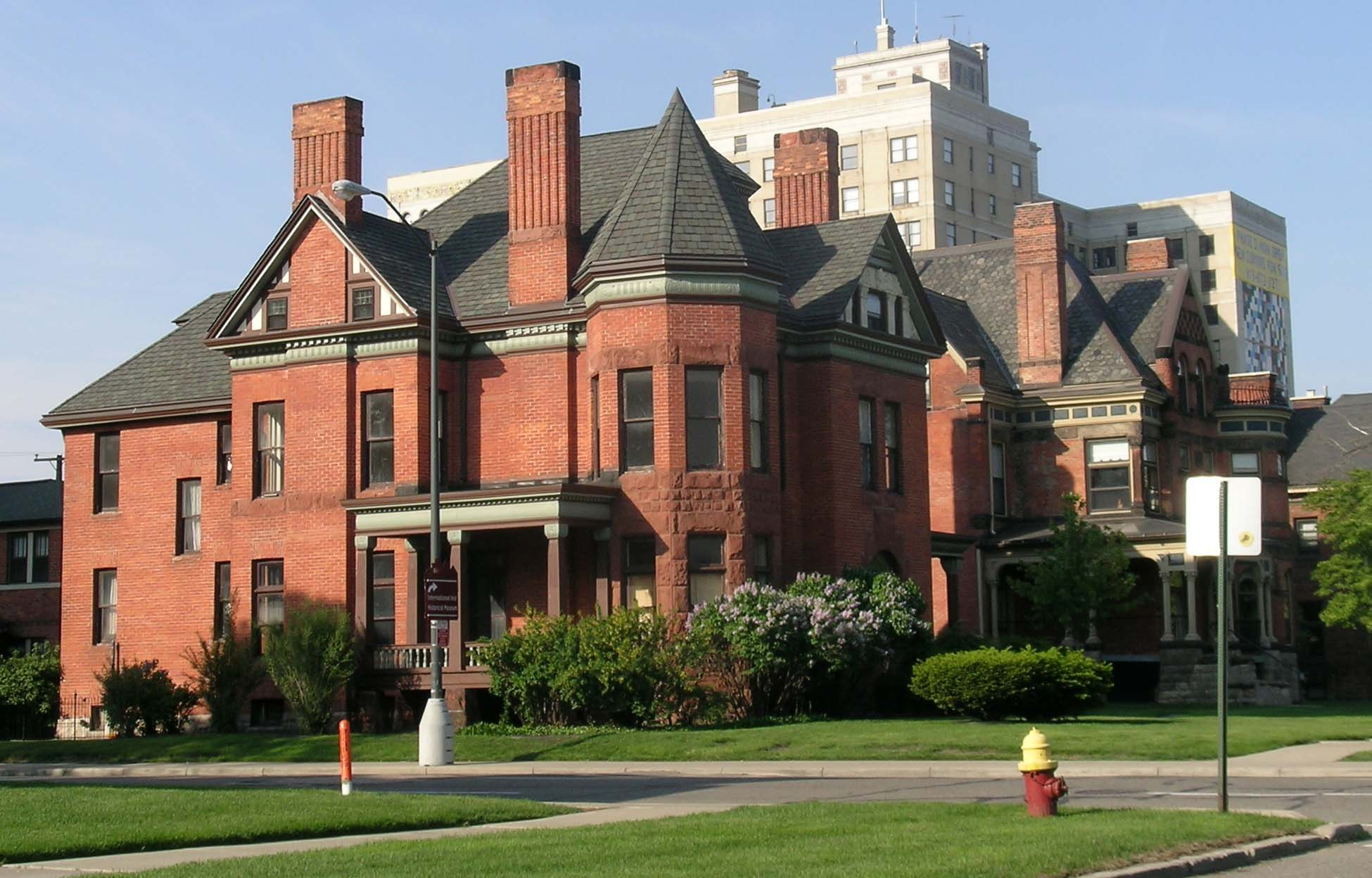
Restored Victorian homes on East Ferry

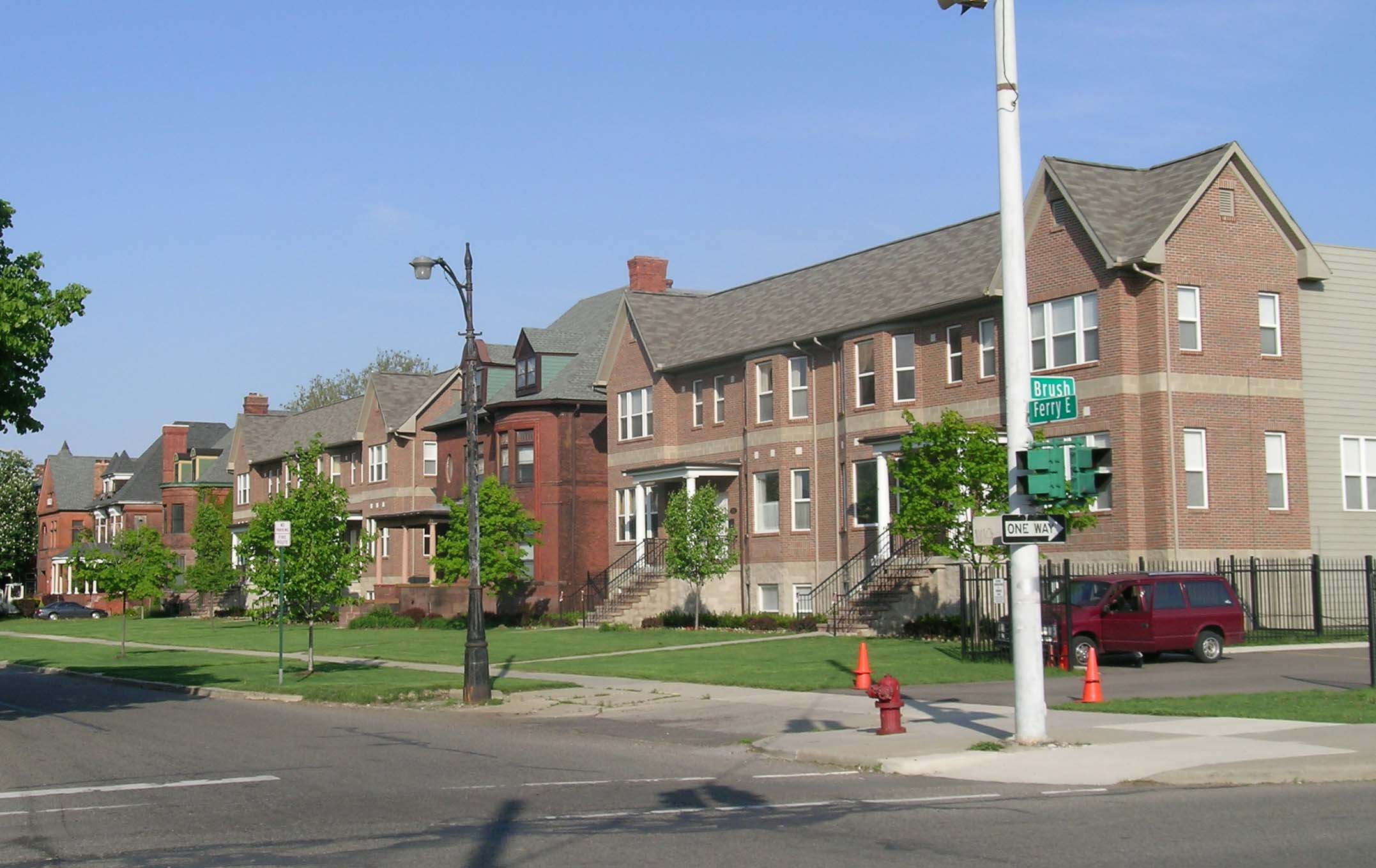
Newer along with restored homes on East Ferry

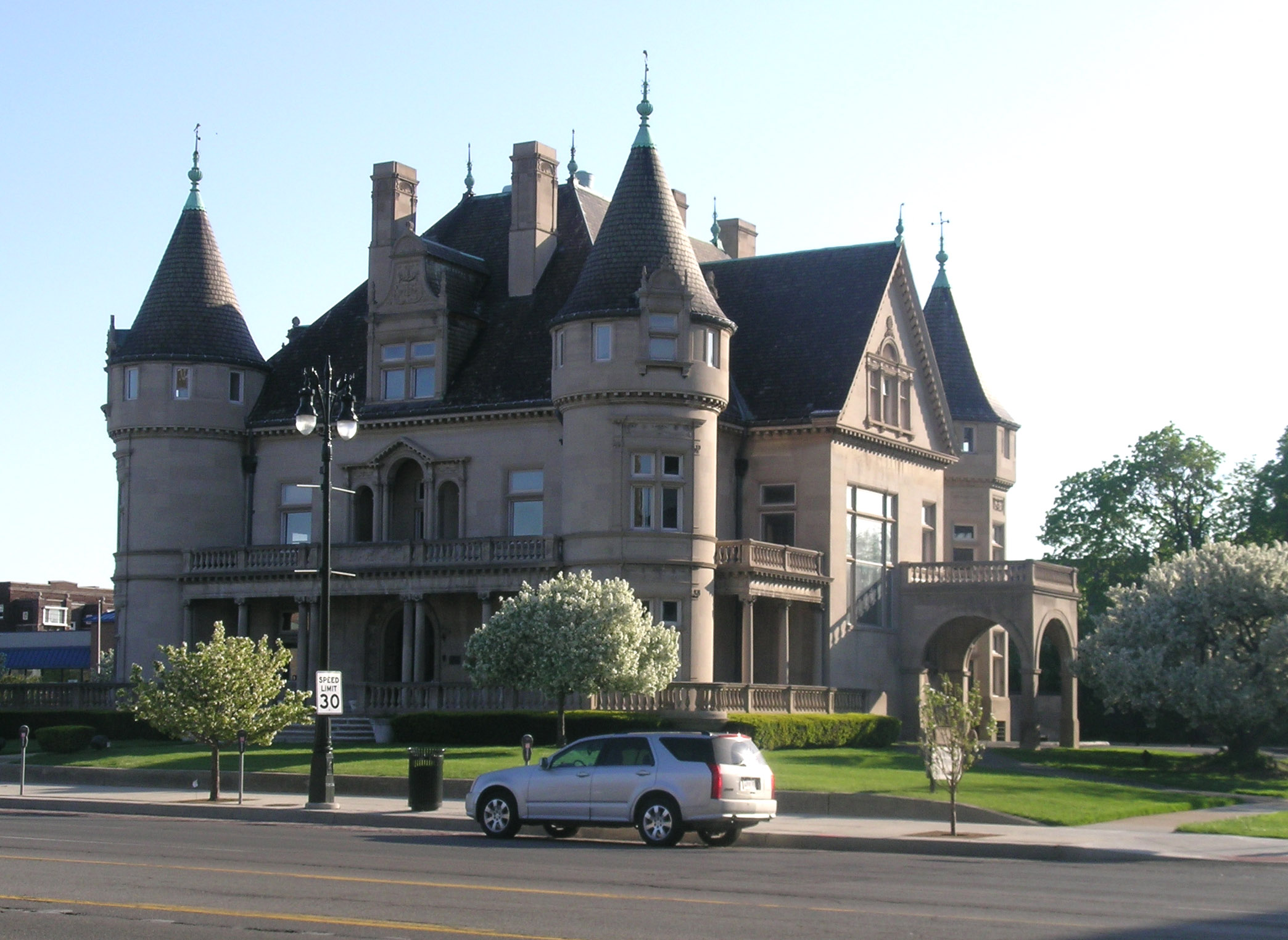
Col. Frank J. Hecker House

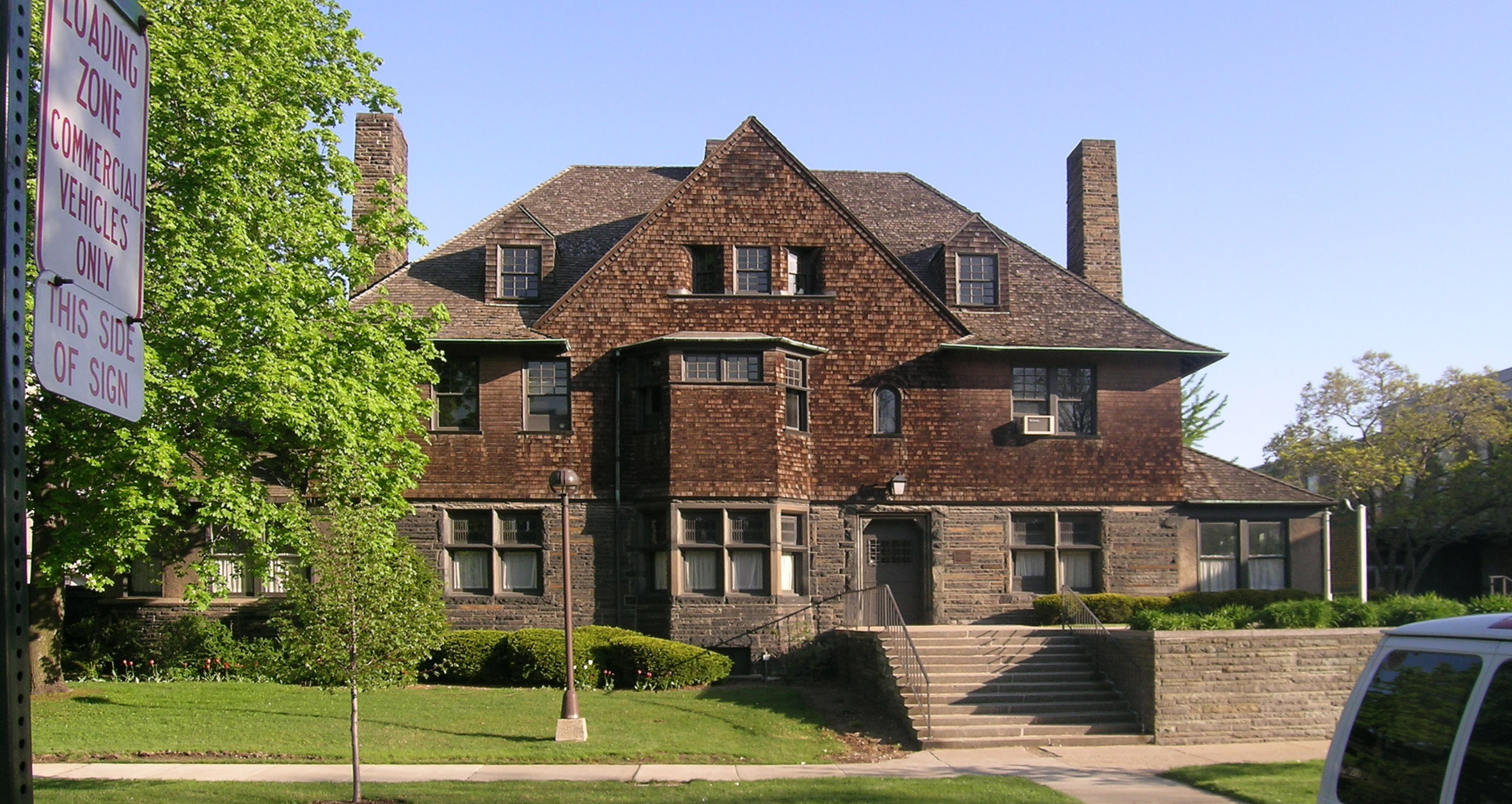
Charles Lang Freer House

== See also ==
- Cultural Center Historic District
