= Col. Frank J. Hecker House =

- U.S. National Register of Historic Places
- Michigan State Historic Site
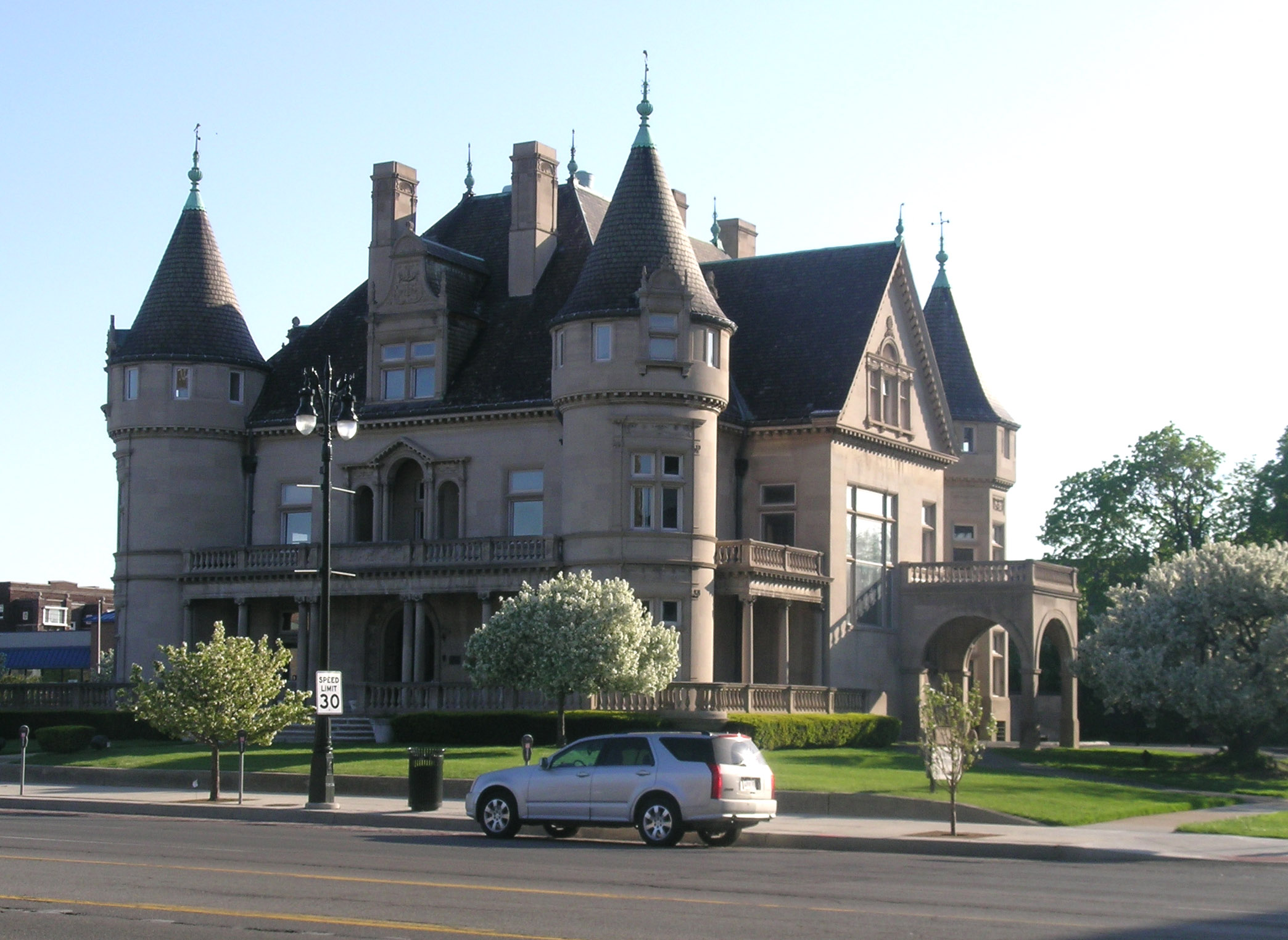
- Interactive map
- Location: 5510 Woodward Ave. Detroit, Michigan
- Coordinates: 42°21′41.67″N 83°4′1.21″W
- Built: 1888–1892
- Architect: Scott, Kamper & Scott
- Architectural style: Châteauesque
- NRHP reference No.: 71000427

Significant dates
- Added to NRHP: September 3, 1971
- Designated MSHS: February 19, 1958

The Col. Frank J. Hecker House is a historic home in Detroit built in 1888 for local businessman and railroad-car manufacturer Colonel Frank J. Hecker. Located at 5510 Woodward Avenue, it was designated a Michigan State Historic Site in 1958. It is located near to the East Ferry Avenue Historic District and Cultural Center Historic District, and was listed on the National Register of Historic Places in 1971. The house has been owned by Wayne State University since September 2014.

== Colonel Frank J. Hecker ==
Frank J. Hecker was born in Freedom, Michigan, in 1846. He joined the Union Army at age 18, and he rose to the rank of Colonel. After the conclusion of the Civil War, he hired on as an agent for the Union Pacific Railroad. Using this experience, he later organized the Peninsular Car Company (with Charles Lang Freer, whose home is next to Hecker's) in Detroit, making his fortune in the railroad supply business.

Hecker served in the Army again in the Spanish–American War, where he was in charge of transporting Spanish prisoners. This service brought him to the attention of President Theodore Roosevelt, who in 1904 appointed Hecker to the Panama Canal Commission. Hecker also served as Detroit Police Commissioner, organized several banks in the midwest, and sat on the boards of the Detroit Copper and Brass Rolling Mills, Michigan Fire and Marine Insurance Company, and the Detroit Lumber Company.

== Architecture ==
In 1888, Hecker hired the short-lived architectural firm of Scott, Kamper & Scott (which included Louis Kamper) and began construction of the mansion on Woodward Avenue, at the corner of Ferry. The house, with 21,000 square feet (1,951 m^{2}), is an imposing example of French Châteauesque style based on the Château de Chenonceaux near Tours, France. Hecker used his home to host elaborate parties, whose guests included presidents William McKinley and Rutherford B. Hayes.

The exterior of the home has large towers at the corners, and Flemish dormers in the steep hip roof. Several bays project from the main body of the home, and wrapped around the whole is a balustraded, colonnaded loggia. A carriage house at the rear is clearly visible from Woodward. At one point, this structure was converted into a concert hall capable of seating 200.

The interior has 49 rooms, including a large oak-paneled hall designed for large parties, an oval dining room done in mahogany, a lobby done in English oak, and a white and gold music room. The fireplaces were constructed of Egyptian Nubian marble, and onyx and Italian Siena marble were used in the vestibules.

== Later use ==
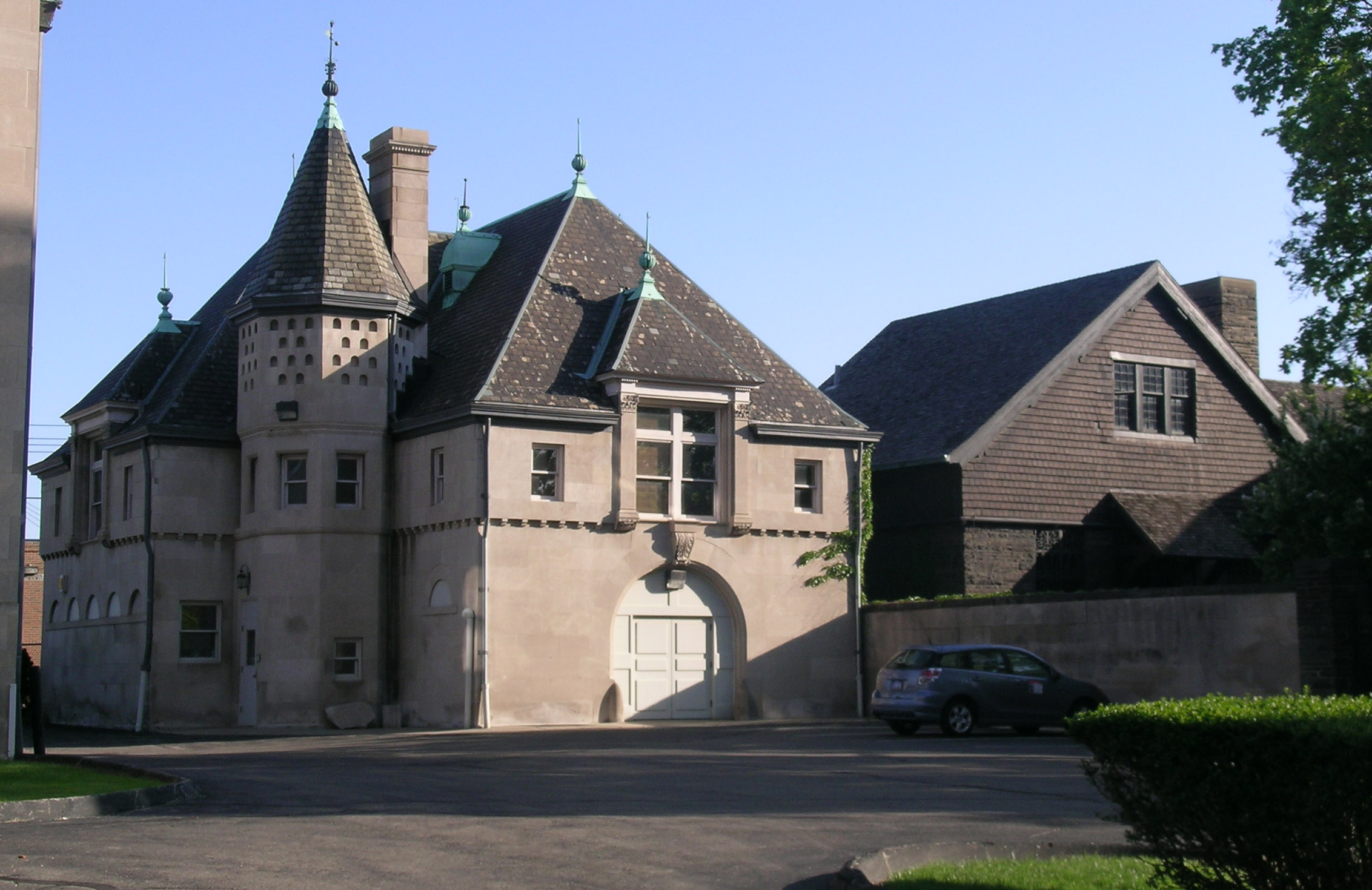
The carriage house of the Hecker mansion. The structure on the right is the carriage house of the Freer House next door.

Hecker lived in the home until his death in 1927. For the next twenty years, the home was owned by the Hecker family, but it operated as a boarding house for single college students.

In 1947, the mansion was sold to Paul Smiley of the Smiley Brothers Music Company, who used it for musical instruction and practice, as well as a sales office. During this time, both the Detroit Chamber Music Workshop and Women's Symphony started on the premises.

When Smiley died in 1990, the building was sold to Charfoos & Christensen, P.C., a law firm. The firm rehabilitated the mansion, and it served as their law offices until 2014. The mansion has also served as the Royal Danish Consulate in Detroit.

In September 2014, Wayne State University purchased the house for $2.3 million. The university calls it the Tierney Alumni House and it houses the Alumni Relations Department and is used for alumni-related activities.
