= Verona Apartments (Detroit) =

- U.S. National Register of Historic Places
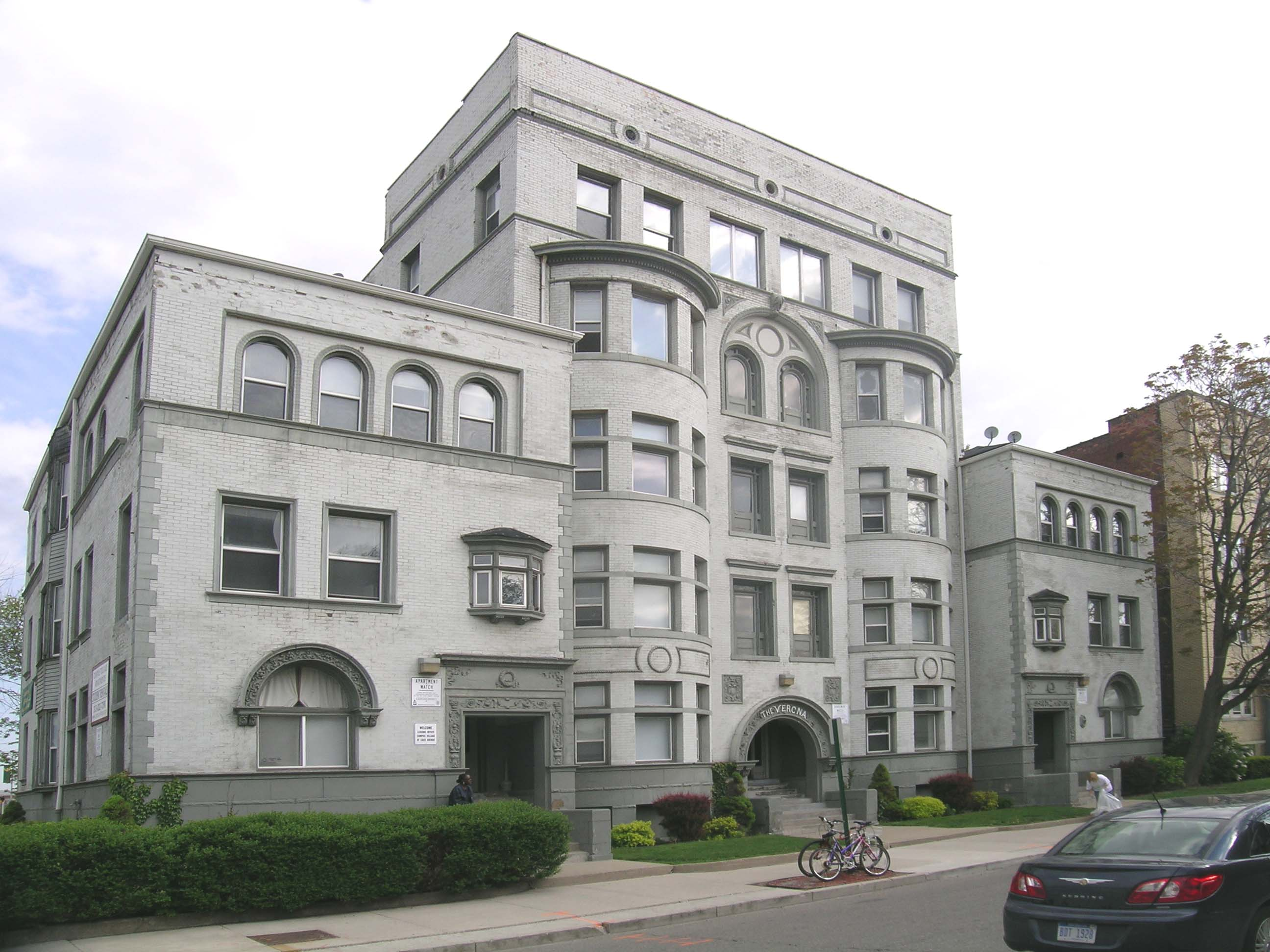
- Interactive map
- Location: 92 West Ferry Avenue; Detroit, Michigan
- Coordinates: 42°21′40″N 83°4′9″W
- Built: 1896
- Architect: William G. Malcomson & William E. Higginbotham
- Architectural style: Romanesque Revival
- MPS: University–Cultural Center Phase I MRA
- NRHP reference No.: 86001040
- Added to NRHP: April 29, 1986

The Verona Apartments is an apartment building located in the Cass Corridor in Detroit, Michigan. The central section is located at 96 W. Ferry. The East and West wings are located at 92 W. Ferry and 100 W. Ferry, respectively. It was listed on the National Register of Historic Places in 1986. The Verona Apartments are now owned and leased by Cass and Ferry Apartments.

== History ==
The Verona Apartments were built in 1896 by the Detroit firm of Malcomson and Higginbotham. The original layout of the apartment building had 16 luxury suites. When home ownership became easier in the 1930s, demand for this type of suite apartment declined, and in 1945 the building was reconfigured to include 26 smaller apartments.

== Architecture ==
The Verona Apartments consist of a five-story central section with flanking three-story wings. The base of the structure is stone; the main body is built of brick, originally orange but now painted gray. The entryway is arched, echoing the arch on the fourth floor, and the building name is embedded in the arche curvature. There are decorative touches throughout the exterior of the building, including the friezework above the first-floor windows, the bowed structures flanking the entrance, and inlays above the first and fifth floors.
