= Panama City Mall =

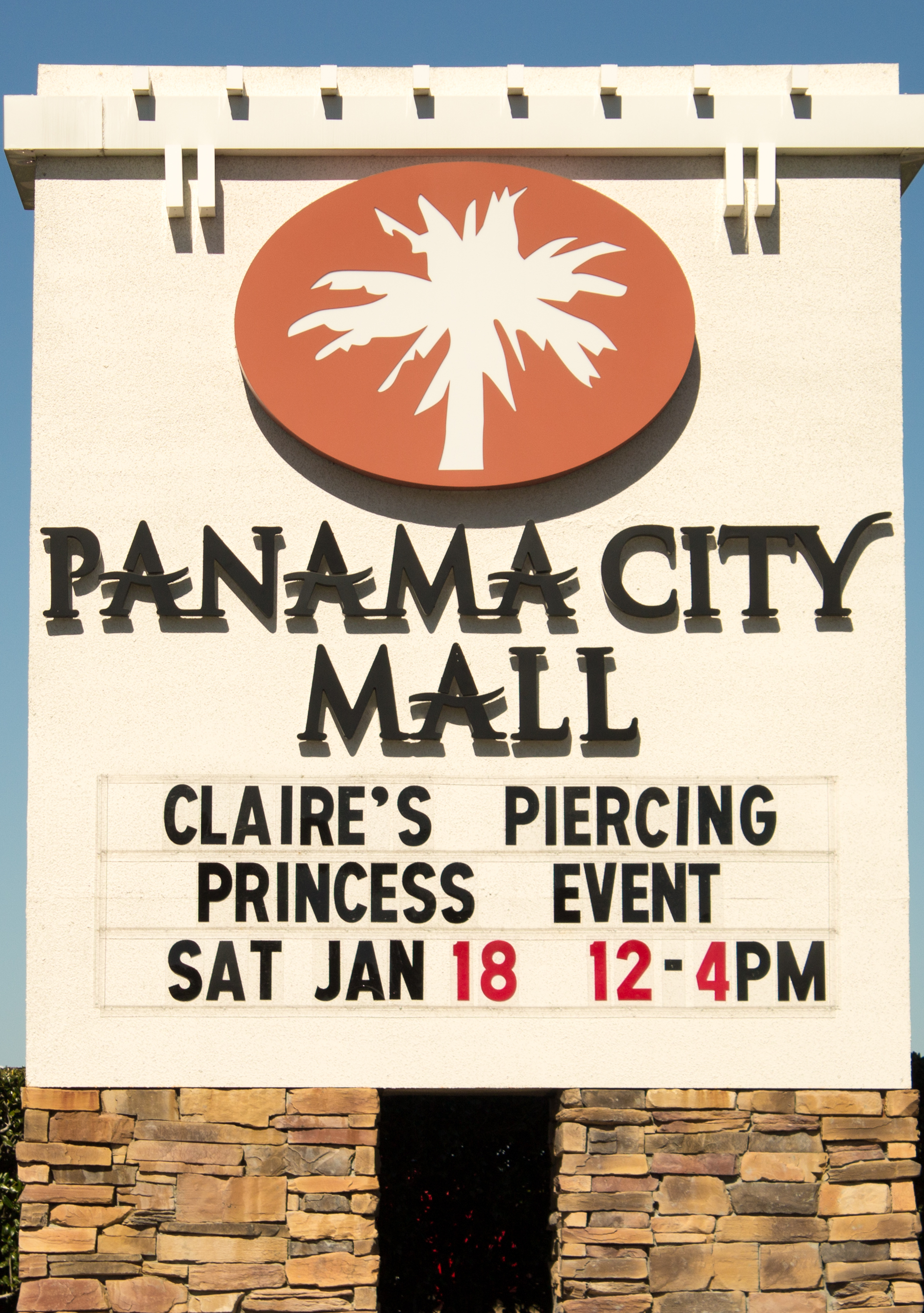
- Mall entrance sign, January 2014
- Location: Panama City, Florida, United States
- Coordinates: 30.187°N 85.6476°W
- Address: 2150 Martin Luther King Jr. Blvd.
- Opened: August 10, 1976
- Closed: December 5, 2018
- Developer: Charles N. Agree
- Owner: Hendon Properties
- Num. of stores: 13
- Num. of anchor tenants: 5 (2 open) (1 demolished) (2 vacant)
- Floor area: 608,339 square feet (57,000 m^{2})
- Floors: 1
- Website: www.panamacity-mall.com

Panama City Mall was a single story enclosed shopping mall in Panama City, Florida. Opened in 1976, it featured J. C. Penney, Gayfers, and Sears as its anchor stores. As of September 2013, it was owned and managed by Hendon Properties of Atlanta, which purchased it from CBL & Associates Properties. The mall closed due to Hurricane Michael and received major damages. It will not be reopening. However, a possible redevelopment of the site was proposed in July 2020 for a potential redevelopment for an open-air retail center with a hotel, residential apartments, and office space, much like Pier Park to the west in Panama City Beach.

== History ==
The mall, built by Charles N. Agree, opened in August 1976 with Sears and Gayfers as its anchor stores.

An East Wing and J.C. Penney anchor store were completed in November 1982. The Gayfers store was rebranded by Dillard's in 1999.

Cost Plus World Market and Linens 'n Things were both added to the mall in the late 2000s, resulting in the relocation of existing stores. Linens 'n Things became Bed Bath & Beyond, while Cost Plus World Market has since moved to Pier Park at Panama City Beach, Florida. Planet Fitness opened next to Dillard's.

In 2015, Sears Holdings spun off 235 of its properties, including the Sears at Panama City Mall, into Seritage Growth Properties.

On October 15, 2018, Sears announced that it would be closing its location at the mall in the future after Sears declared Chapter 11 bankruptcy.

On December 5, 2018, owner Hendon Properties announced the mall's permanent closure, citing rebuilding costs as the primary factor after catastrophic damage from Hurricane Michael. Dillard's and JCPenney announced their locations would be repaired and reopened as stand-alone stores in 2019. Dillard's reopened in October 2018, with reduced store hours, and has since returned to normal hours. On August 30, 2019, J.C. Penney reopened for business. Bed Bath & Beyond closed in 2019.

On July 31, 2020, JCPenney put 21 stores up for sale, this one included. On December 17, 2022, Planet Fitness relocated next to Kohl's near Target and Denny's on Martin Luther King Jr. Boulevard. Demolition of the former Sears began in August 2024 and was expected to be completed by November.
