= Jefferson–Chalmers Historic Business District =

Historic district in Michigan, United States

- U.S. National Register of Historic Places
- U.S. Historic district
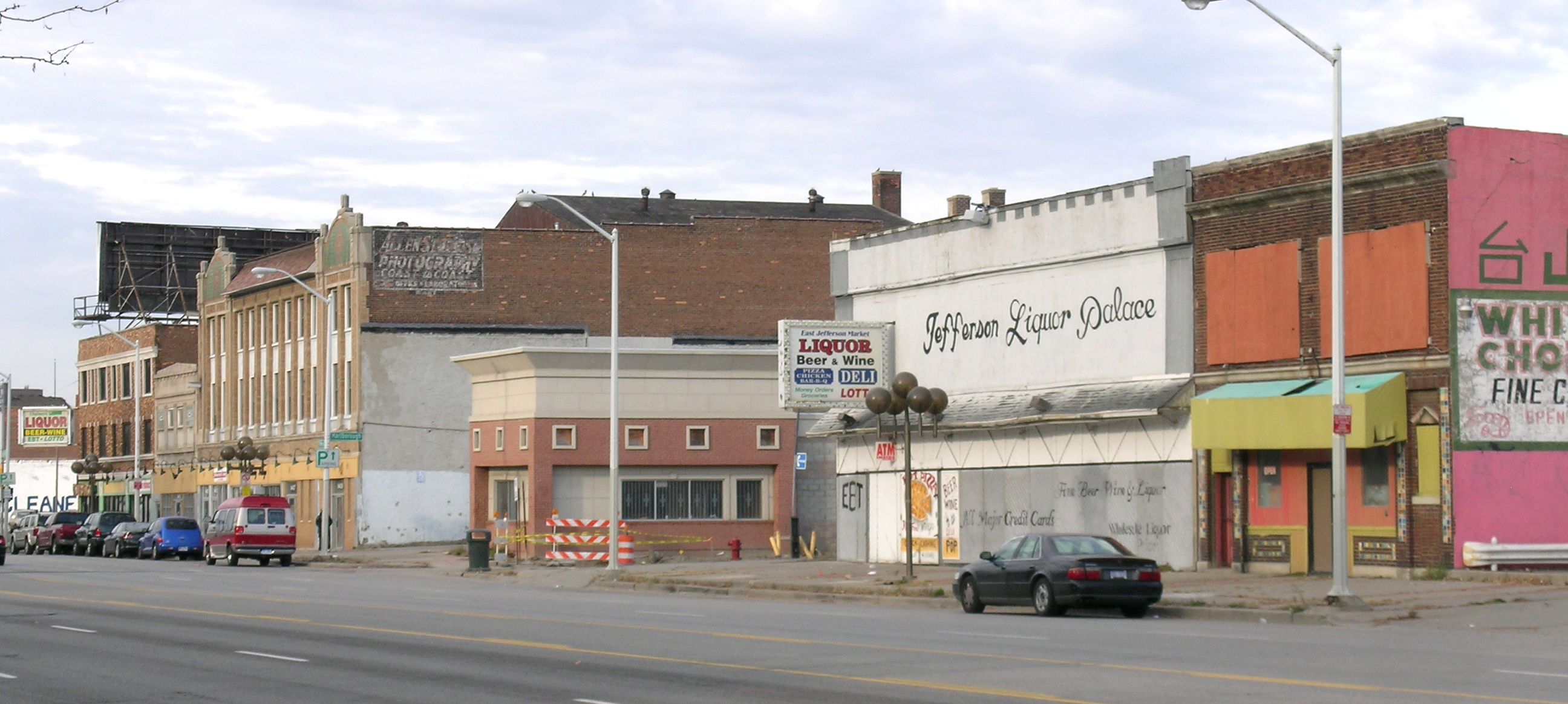
- Jefferson streetscape looking west toward Chalmers in 2008

- Location within Michigan Location within the United States
- Interactive map
- Location: E. Jefferson Ave. between Eastlawn St. and Alter Rd. Detroit, Michigan, U.S.
- Coordinates: 42°22′26″N 82°56′34″W
- Area: 29 acres (12 ha)
- Architect: multiple
- Architectural style: Early Commercial, Late Gothic Revival
- NRHP reference No.: 04000598
- Added to NRHP: June 16, 2004

The Jefferson–Chalmers Historic Business District is a neighborhood located on East Jefferson Avenue between Eastlawn Street and Alter Road in Detroit, Michigan. The district is the only continuously intact commercial district remaining along East Jefferson Avenue, and was listed on the National Register of Historic Places in 2004.

The Historic Jefferson–Chalmers Business District is one of a few early twentieth-century neighborhood commercial districts that is still surviving in Detroit. During the 1920s, this district along Jefferson was the center of the east-side neighborhood's commercial, social, and cultural life. The district is unique in that two big-band era ballrooms, the cultural fulcrums of the early 20th century social scene, still exist within the district: the Monticello and the Vanity Ballroom.

== Nomenclature ==
The Jefferson East neighborhood of Detroit is bounded by Alter Road on the east, St. Jean Street on the west, Charlevoix Street on the north, and the Detroit River on the south. Jefferson Avenue runs approximately through the center of the Jefferson East neighborhood, and is primarily commercial in nature for thirteen blocks from Dickerson Street to Alter Road. This section of Jefferson Avenue is also known as the Jefferson East Business District. Historically significant structures exist along Jefferson Avenue for eight blocks from Conner to Alter Road; this section of the Jefferson East Business District is designated as the Jefferson–Chalmers Historic Business District.

== History ==
East Jefferson Avenue was originally an Indian trail running along the Detroit River. As French settlers established ribbon farms along the river in the 1700s, the trail morphed into what is now River Road, connecting the farms with Fort Detroit. The area that is now within this district was, at the time, a marshy section surrounding Fox Creek, and therefore was relatively sparsely settled. In the 1800s, the Jefferson–Chalmers area gradually became more agricultural, as the swamp was drained. In 1851, a plank road was built along Jefferson, from Detroit to Grosse Pointe, with a toll bridge over Fox Creek. Roadhouses were built along the road including, by 1876, a saloon, located on the south side of East Jefferson Avenue near Fox Creek, within what is now this historic district. Other roadhouses were established in the area during the later 1800s.

In 1874, draining of the surrounding swamp began in earnest, spurred in part by prominent Detroit attorney William B. Moran, who owned much of the land. By the 1880s, Moran had built Edgewood Road (now Alter) to access his summer resort on the river. In 1891, a streetcar line was built through the district, connecting Detroit and Grosse Pointe. That same year, the land in the district began to be subdivided, and by 1893, a number of streets crossing Jefferson had been platted. However, by the early 1900s, only a handful of houses had been constructed. In 1907, the area was annexed to Detroit, and by 1910 a number of industrial concerns had been established in the Connor Creek area, just west of the district. The rise of industry ushered in a rapid influx of residents, and the Jefferson–Chalmers Historic Business District began to grow rapidly as a result.

By 1913, a number of commercial buildings had been constructed in the district, including the 1912 W.J. Hiller Building (14350-56 E. Jefferson), one of the oldest buildings still existing in the district. Businesses included a tailor, hardware store, drug store, physicians, grocers, and dry goods. Also by 1913, the small frame wooden structure St. Columba church (1913-2003) was constructed on Manistique. 1915 brought an explosion of development in the Jefferson–Chalmers area, with a string of commercial buildings, constructed along Jefferson. Automobile-related businesses also were constructed in the district in the later 1910s, as well as religious buildings. New development continued in the surrounding neighborhoods into the 1920s, spurred by the Chrysler Motor Company's construction of a huge nearby factory. A number of apartments were built in the district to house the influx of workers.

The Great Depression ended the construction boom in the district, but business began to revive later in the 1930s with the establishment of stores in the area. The Jefferson–Chalmers area continued to thrive through the 1940s and 1950s, but in 1954 the nearby Hudson Motors plant closed, starting a slow decline in economic fortunes. The loss of jobs was exacerbated by the loss of residents, as more people left Detroit for the nearby suburbs. The decline lasted through the 1970s, and into the 1980s. During the 1990s, there was reinvestment in the area, with new residential and retail construction growth.

The district has recently seen a resurgence, with a Michigan Cool Cities grant, five million dollars' worth of streetscape improvements, and rehabilitation of a number of anchor buildings in the district, such as the Platte Warehouse at Jefferson and Ashland, and the Chalmers Building at Jefferson and Chalmers.

== Description ==
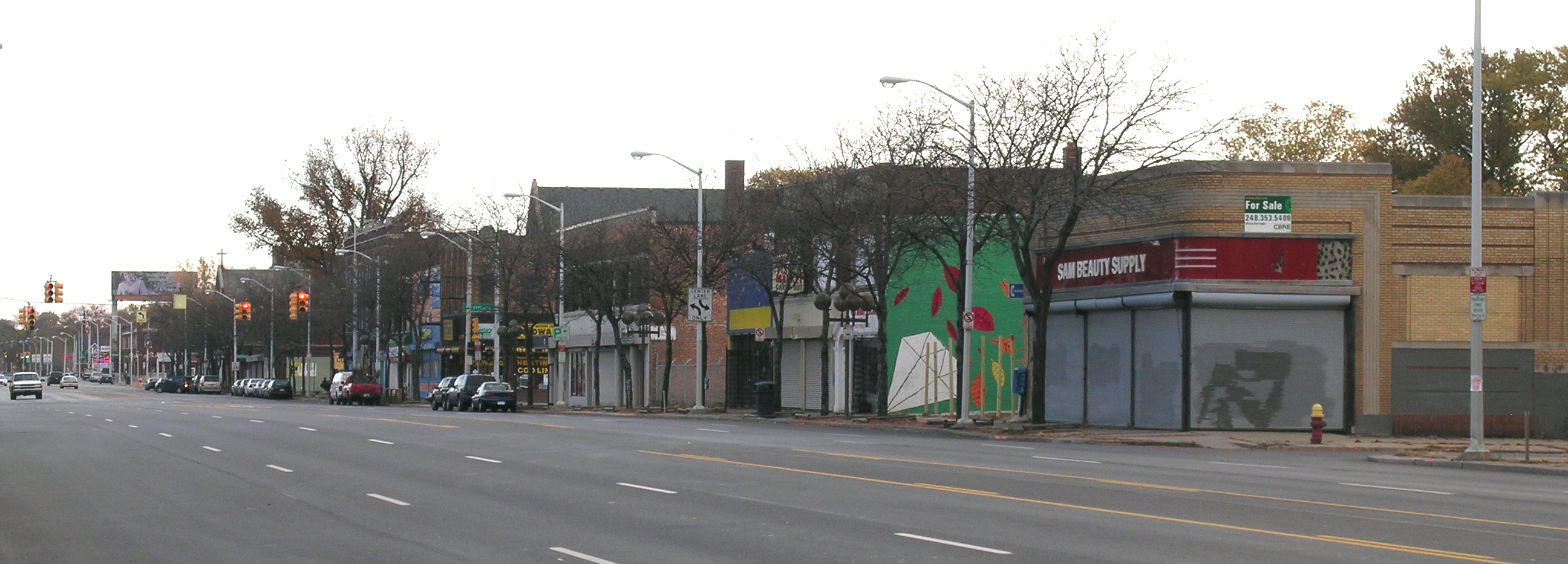
Jefferson streetscape in 2008, looking east from Newport

The Jefferson–Chalmers Historic Business District contains 57 buildings bordering East Jefferson Avenue, running for eight blocks between Eastlawn Street and Alter Road, at the border between Detroit and Grosse Pointe Park, Michigan. Most of the buildings front onto Jefferson, but a few front onto side streets in the block adjacent to Jefferson. Most of the structures are two-story, multi-storefront commercial buildings, dating from the 1910s and 1920s, but the district also includes apartment buildings and churches, and houses two ballrooms: the Vanity and the Monticello. The buildings lining Jefferson generally fill the entire lot, fronting directly onto the sidewalk and sharing walls with adjacent buildings, creating an unbroken streetfront.

Significant structures include:

=== Churches ===
- Jefferson Avenue United Methodist Church, 14456 East Jefferson: The original church building was constructed in 1914 and enlarged with a brick Gothic Revival auditorium in the early 1920s. The original building was demolished in the 1950s, and the auditorium became the main church building. A contemporary steel and glass addition was constructed in 1957.
- Faith English Evangelical Lutheran Church, 14554 East Jefferson: This three-story brick-and-stone church was designed by Paul Kroske of Donaldson and Meier in 1918, and constructed in 1921–1926. It is an asymmetrical Neo-Gothic building with a bell tower on the eastern side.
- St. Columba Parish Building, 14635 East Jefferson: This three-story, five-bay, brick-and-stone building was designed by Lancelot Suckert and constructed in 1923. The St. Columba Activity Hall is a three-story Elizabethan building with gabled end bays and a slate roof. Storefronts beneath segmental arches are at street level.
- Eastminster Presbyterian Church / Original Primitive Baptist Church, 937 Manistique: This 2 1/2-story rectangular Tudor Revival church was built in 1920. The Manistique Avenue facade is faced with ashlar limestone, and the piers are strongly emphasized to resemble buttresses. The projecting main entrance is located on one end of the facade, and contains a double doorway within a segmental arch.
- St. Columba Episcopal Church, 1021 Manistique: This English Gothic Revival style church was designed by Lancelot Suckert and constructed in 1927. It is cruciform in plan, with a large crenellated bell tower. The exterior is clad with limestone, with a slate roof and copper gutters. Stained glass windows line either side of the nave, with another large stained glass window set in the apse.

=== Apartment buildings ===
- Century Lakewood Apartment, 14230-40 East Jefferson: This 3 1/2-story, H-shaped brick apartment building was constructed in 1924. It is a Classical Revival building housing 44 apartments and seven storefronts at ground level. The half-basement story is clad in cream-colored cast stone, and alternating cream-colored cast stone and red brick delineate the window bays.
- Windmill Pointe Manor, 943 Alter: This four-story apartment building constructed in 1930 houses 38 apartments. It is a Spanish eclectic/Moorish/ Art Deco design faced with yellow/orange brick, containing decorative herringbone and corbelled brick patterns. Limestone trim surrounds the Alter Road entrance.
- Alter Road Apartment (Pointe Manor Apartments), 1020 Alter: This 2 1/2-story apartment building constructed in 1926 houses 13 apartments. It is faced with mottled red and brown brick, with cast stone surrounding the entrance. The building's hipped roof has wide overhanging eaves, and contains gables placed over projecting bays. The Alter Road Apartment has a similar massing, design and setback to its three sister buildings at 1034, 1044, and 1060 Alter; the four buildings make up the Pointe Manor Apartments complex.
- Barnes Apartments (Pointe Manor Apartments), 1034 Alter: This 2 1/2-story apartment building constructed in 1925 is similar to the Alter Road Apartment. It is a symmetrical red and brown brick Colonial Revival structure which houses 17 apartments. The building has a hipped roof containing gables placed over projecting bays. The entrance is through glass double doors surrounded by cast stone and flanked by fluted pilasters, with a transom window above.
- Pointe Manor Apartments, 1044 Alter: This 2 1/2-story five-bay apartment building constructed in 1925 is similar to the Alter Road Apartment. It is a red and brown brick Colonial Revival structure with a flat roof containing 13 apartments. The center entrance is flanked by two projecting bays.
- Pointe Manor Apartments, 1060 Alter: This 2 1/2-story five-bay apartment building constructed in 1926 is similar to the Alter Road Apartment. It is a symmetrical red and brown brick Colonial Revival structure with a flat roof containing 17 apartments. The impressive center entrance is flanked by two projecting bays.
- Eastlawn Apartments, 1044 Eastlawn: This 3 1/2-story symmetrical Classical Revival apartment building constructed in 1924 contains 23 apartments. The center entrance is covered by a portico containing two Doric columns. The center bay on each side projects forward, containing a triple window and topped with a copper roof.
- 950 Manistique: This 2 1/2-story three-bay Mission/Spanish Colonial Revival apartment building constructed in 1930 contains 13 apartments. It is constructed of dark red brick, and the front facade is dominated by a slightly projecting gable filled with a round brick arch. The front entrance projects from the facade, and is covered with a gable roofed with barrel tiles.
- IDAO Apartments (910 Marlborough): This 3 1/2-story seven-bay apartment building designed by Ernest C. Thulin and constructed in 1927 contains 13 apartments. It is constructed of red brick, and contains Tudor Revival details.
- Marlboro Apartments (1031 Marlborough): This 3 1/2-story five-bay apartment building constructed in 1927 contains 19 apartments. It is a yellow brick, Elizabethan-inspired structure with a protruding front entrance and symmetrical window arrangement.
- Sheldor Apartments1025 (Newport): This 3 1/2-story H-shaped six-bay apartment building constructed in 1925 contains 32 apartments. The front facade is faces with buff-colored brick, with the raised basement level sheathed in cast stone. The entrance is through a narrow courtyard.

=== Ballrooms ===
- Vanity Ballroom, 14201 East Jefferson: The Vanity was designed by Charles N. Agree and constructed in 1929. It as a Mayan/ Aztec influenced Art Deco structure, with storefronts on the first floor and the ballroom area above. Entrance pavilions at each corner of the building rise above the rest of the building, while a frieze at the top of the building features brick "jaguars" running across. Square green Pewabic Pottery tiles fill the arches above the second floor windows.
- Monticello Ballroom, 14421-29 East Jefferson: The Monticello is a three-story structure designed by Pollmar & Ropes and constructed in 1928. The building has Spanish Colonial Revival and Art Deco exterior design elements, with raised, rounded parapets at each end of the building and a pent roof in between. The first floor contains storefronts, and the second housed the ballroom.

=== Commercial buildings ===
- St. Amour Building, 14111 East Jefferson: This building is a two-story commercial brick building originally containing five storefronts, with 13 apartments on the second floor. It was designed by E. C. Thulin and constructed in 1920.
- Sam's Beauty Supply / S. S. Kresge, 14300 East Jefferson: This is a single-story, rounded corner Moderne style brick commercial building constructed in 1936 by the S. S. Kresge Company. The front is spanned by plate glass windows, with red pigmented structural glass blocks (originally a background for the S. S. Kresge store name) above.
- W. J. Hiller Building, 14350-56 East Jefferson: The W. J. Hiller Building is a two-story Commercial Brick building built in two partsm in 1912 and 1914. The building was designed by the architectural firm of Spier, Rohns & Gehrke. The building has a diagonal comer at the street intersection, with plate glass windows spanning the first floor and regularly spaced windows on the second.
- Walgreens Drugs / Riverfront Building Supply, 14400 East Jefferson: This vibrant two story brick commercial building, constructed in 1929, is attributed to architect Charles N. Agree. The building has five storefronts along Jefferson, with offices above. The Art Deco style is expressed with multicolor brick in chevron and checkerboard patterns.
- Platte Apartments / Sutton's Drugs, 14401 East Jefferson: This three-story Commercial Brick building was constructed in 1928 by Jerry Oldenkamp, a real estate developer. It originally contained five stores and eighteen apartments; however, the first-floor storefronts have been altered. The brick facing is enhanced by the use of cast stone framing the third floor windows and accenting the second floor window surrounds.
- Winkelman's, 14411-15 East Jefferson: This two-story, four-bay, brick commercial building was constructed in 1928. The second story has a scored cast stone veneer, with classical pilasters between the windows.
- The Chalmers Building, 14432-36 East Jefferson: This symmetrical three-story Commercial Brick structure was built in 1925. It is four bays wide with three windows per bay on the upper floors. The center entrance is framed with a molded architrave and topped with a carved panel saying "The Chalmers." The building originally contained 33 apartments and four storefronts.
- People's State Bank / National Bank of Detroit, 14555 East Jefferson: This single-story, limestone and brick building was constructed in 1925 from a design by architect Hans Gehrke. An addition was constructed in 1953. The Classical Revival style echoes a Greek temple, with limestone sheathing, Ionic columns flanking the recessed entrance, denticulated cornice, and the pediment atop the front facade.
- Ned's Auto Supply / Palace Cleaners, 14701 East Jefferson: This is a low, single-story brick Art Deco commercial building constructed in 1933. The East Jefferson facade is dominated by a long roofline, stretching to create a garage bay on one side. An entrance is at the corner facing the garage space. Nine plaques containing the letter "N" decorate the roofline along Jefferson an Manistique.
- Fox Creek Backwater Gates, 14737 East Jefferson: This single-story Classical/ Art Deco style public works building was constructed in 1930. It houses underground gates that control the level of Fox Creek. It is constructed if yellow multi-tone brick, with cast stone surrounds defining the door openings.
- Peter Platte Motor Sales / B. F. Goodrich, 14801 East Jefferson: This three-story brick and reinforced concrete commercial building was constructed as an automotive sales showroom in 1919. A two-story addition was constructed in 1936.

== Cityscape ==
The housing consists of bungalows and Arts and Crafts houses built in the early 20th century. John Carlisle (Detroitblogger John) of the Metro Times said that the houses "still have beauty and character despite weathering over the years". Most blocks have many owner occupied houses and mowed lawns. There are some vacant lots alongside streets and some boarded-up foreclosed houses. Recently Kathy Makino-Leipsitz, owner of Shelborne Development, completed full rehabilitations on three buildings located on Jefferson Avenue opening up 49 - 1, 2 & 3 bedroom apartments.

== See also ==
- National Register of Historic Places listings in Detroit, Michigan
