= Interstate 375 (Michigan) =

Highway in Detroit, Michigan

Interstate 375
- Walter P. Chrysler Freeway
- I-375 highlighted in red, BS I-375 in green

Route information
- Auxiliary route of I-75
- Maintained by MDOT
- Length: 1.062 mi (1.709 km)
- Existed: June 12, 1964–present
- NHS: Entire route

Major junctions
- South end: BS I-375 in Detroit
- North end: I-75 in Detroit

Location
- Country: United States
- State: Michigan
- Counties: Wayne

Highway system
- Interstate Highway System; Main; Auxiliary; Suffixed; Business; Future; Michigan State Trunkline Highway System; Interstate; US; State; Byways
| ← M-343 | → I-475 |

Interstate 375 (I-375) is a north–south auxiliary Interstate Highway in Detroit, Michigan, United States. It is the southernmost leg of the Walter P. Chrysler Freeway and a spur of I-75 into Downtown Detroit, ending at the unsigned Business Spur I-375 (BS I-375), better known as Jefferson Avenue. The freeway opened on June 12, 1964. At only 1.062 miles (1.709 km) in length, it once had the distinction of being the shortest signed Interstate Highway in the country before I-110 in El Paso, Texas, was signed. The Michigan Department of Transportation (MDOT) announced in 2021 plans to convert the freeway to a boulevard. Details of that project were revealed in April 2023 with MDOT reaffirming that construction was scheduled to begin in 2025; these plans were paused indefinitely in August 2025.

== Route description ==
I-375 and the Chrysler Freeway begin at Jefferson Avenue between St. Antoine Street and Beaubien Street in Downtown Detroit near the Renaissance Center. The freeway runs east before turning north. Just about a mile (1.6 km) after the southern terminus, I-375 meets the Fisher Freeway which carries I-75 north of downtown. At this interchange, I-75 takes ramps to leave the Fisher Freeway and uses the Chrysler Freeway, replacing I-375. I-375 is a four-lane freeway south of the I-75 interchange, where it widens to six lanes. As with all other Interstate Highways, the entire length of I-375 is included on the National Highway System, a network of roadways that are important to the country's economy, defense, and mobility.

According to MDOT, I-375 is 1.062 miles (1.709 km). At the time it opened until at least 2007, I-375 was the shortest signed Interstate in the country. Based on Federal Highway Administration (FHWA) data, there are three Interstates that are shorter: I-110 in Texas (0.92 mi or 1.48 km), I-878 in New York (0.70 mi or 1.13 km), and I-315 in Montana (0.83 mi or 1.34 km). The latter two designations are not signed on their respective roadways, and I-110 in Texas has since been signed.

Every year, MDOT conducts a series of surveys on its highways in the state to measure traffic volume. In 2009, MDOT calculated that 14,112 vehicles per day used the southernmost section of I-375 on average and 53,900 vehicles used the northernmost section near I-75. These vehicles included 798 trucks.

== History ==
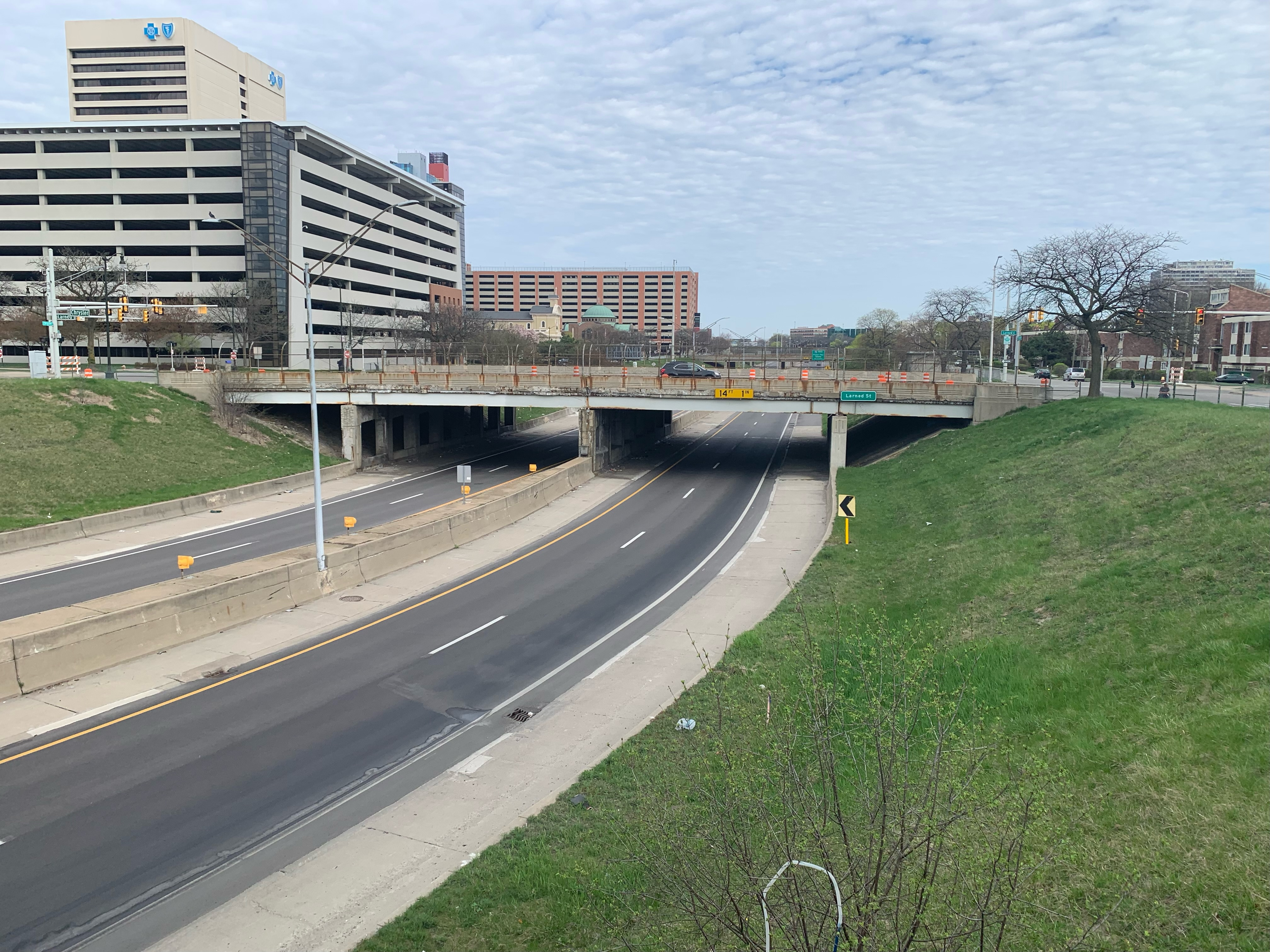
A view of I-375, looking northbound

Construction on the first segments of the Chrysler Freeway started on January 30, 1959. The area where the freeway was built was called Black Bottom, a historic district that received its name from the soil found there by French explorers. In the 1940s and 1950s, the area was home to a community of African-American entrepreneurs and businesses that rivaled Harlem in New York City. Black Bottom was one of the oldest neighborhoods in the city, and, at the time of freeway construction, it had wooden sewers and dilapidated buildings.

In the 1950s and 1960s, the neighborhood was one of the poorest in the city. There was a perception among whites that the duplexes its residents lived in were overcrowded and run-down, putting the neighborhood in the crosshairs of the 1960s policies of slum clearance. The area, like Corktown to the west of downtown, was targeted by urban planners for demolition in the 1950s and 1960s, which included the Chrysler Freeway and public housing projects.

In the case of the construction of the Chrysler Freeway, some of the most crucial entertainment and cultural communities in Detroit, Black Bottom, and Paradise Valley were destroyed. The unrest this caused is sometimes cited as a contributing factor to the 1967 Detroit riot.

On June 12, 1964, a surface street highway/freeway in Detroit that ran north from Jefferson Avenue and Randolph Street to the Fisher/Chrysler freeway interchange was opened. The southernmost segment, built through the Black Bottom neighborhood, was designated I-375 at this time. The freeway cost $50 million to build (equivalent to $385 million in 2024).

== Future ==
In April 2013, MDOT announced that it was studying whether to repair the freeway at a cost of $80 million (equivalent to $106 million in 2024) or convert the freeway south of Gratiot Avenue into a boulevard to reduce maintenance cost. This change would make the area more pedestrian-friendly and bring new developers and residents into the neighborhood. Converting this segment of the freeway and its right-of-way to a boulevard would free up 12 acres (4.9 ha) of land for development. The department invited businesses and other groups affected by the potential project to participate in the study in November 2013. Advocates of the conversion cite increased pedestrian access and an improved connection between Eastern Market and downtown as reasons to remove the freeway. Also, because the freeway has outdated geometric conditions, such as ramp widths and curvature, the high crash rates and congestion of I-375 are used to support the freeway's removal. Some people who live or work along the freeway and in the downtown area note the improved access I-375 provides to the area as reasons to retain the freeway.

Six alternative proposals for rebuilding I-375 were unveiled by MDOT in June 2014. They ranged in price from $40 million to $80 million (equivalent to $52.1 million–104 million in 2024). These options included rebuilding the freeway as is, reducing it to a boulevard or multiple one-way streets, or upgrading the existing freeway right-of-way to include bike lanes and other pedestrian-friendly features. In January 2016, the department announced that any decision on a course of action would be delayed indefinitely. However, in May 2017, MDOT announced it was going forward with an environmental assessment to identify a preferred alternative. In December 2017, the department announced that they were down to two alternatives, both of which involved replacing the freeway with a boulevard. Both alternatives presented included a four-lane surface boulevard between Gratiot Avenue and Atwater Street.

In January 2020, the State Transportation Commission removed the project from its five-year plan citing other priorities, pushing the potential completion of the project back to 2027. A refined locally preferred alternative consisting of a boulevard aligned within the southbound lanes of the current freeway was chosen in January 2021. The proposed boulevard is six lanes between the interchanges with I-75 and Jefferson Avenue, and four lanes in width south of Jefferson; it also includes a two-way cycle track on the east side of the boulevard. Costs for the full project were estimated at $250 million, including $200 million for the reconstruction of the interchange, $50 million for the boulevard, and $20 million for reconstruction of Gratiot Avenue east of the intersection.

In November 2021, Governor Gretchen Whitmer requested funding for the project from the United States Department of Transportation under the newly created Reconnecting Communities program. In March 2022, the Federal Highway Administration returned a finding of no significant impact, allowing the project to enter its design phase. On September 15, 2022, it was announced by US Secretary of Transportation Pete Buttigieg that the state of Michigan had received a $105 million federal grant from the Infrastructure for Rebuilding America grant program for the project; reactions to the announcement were mixed at the time. MDOT announced that construction would start in 2025 with an expected completion in 2028. In August 2025, MDOT announced a pause in the project due to cost concerns and community opposition.

== Exit list ==
The entire highway is in Detroit, Wayne County. All exits are unnumbered.

| mi | km | Destinations | Notes |
|---|---|---|---|
| 0.000 | 0.000 | Jefferson Avenue west (BS I-375 south) – Civic Center | Continuation beyond southern terminus |
| 0.430 | 0.692 | Jefferson Avenue east | Southbound exit and northbound entrance |
| 0.689 | 1.109 | Lafayette Avenue, Macomb Avenue | Southbound exit and northbound entrance |
| 0.919 | 1.479 | I-75 south – Toledo M-3 north (Gratiot Avenue) | Northbound exit and southbound entrance; exit 51C on I-75 |
| 1.062 | 1.709 | Madison Street | Southbound left exit and northbound left entrance |
| 1.062 | 1.709 | I-75 north – Flint | Northern terminus; exit 51C on I-75; Chrysler Freeway continues north on I-75 |
1.000 mi = 1.609 km; 1.000 km = 0.621 mi: Incomplete access

== Business spur ==
Business Spur Interstate 375
- Location: Detroit
- Length: 0.167 mi (269 m)
- Existed: 1964–present

Business Spur Interstate 375 (BS I-375), which is 0.167 miles (0.269 km) long, is an unsigned business route that continues west on Jefferson Avenue from the southern end of I-375, ending at the entrance to the Detroit–Windsor Tunnel at Randolph Street. Jefferson Avenue past that intersection is M-10. BS I-375 runs next to the Renaissance Center and under a segment of the People Mover. This designation was created in 1964. (Note: The section of Jefferson Avenue that connects I-375 with M-10 is combined with the freeway as I-375 on MDOT right-of-way (ROW) maps that document property transfers and ROW descriptions, but in the department's Physical Reference Finder Application the street is marked as BS I-375, a designation missing from the official state map for the public.) The 2009 traffic surveys by MDOT reported that 33,376 vehicles, including 922 trucks, had used BS I-375 on an average day.

Major junctions
The entire highway is in Detroit, Wayne County.

| mi | km | Destinations | Notes |
|---|---|---|---|
| 0.000 | 0.000 | M-10 north (Jefferson Avenue west); Randolph Street | Southern termini of BS I-375 and M-10; Jefferson Avenue continues west as M-10 |
| 0.167 | 0.269 | Jefferson Avenue east I-375 north to I-75 – Flint | Interchange; northern terminus; southern terminus of I-375 |
1.000 mi = 1.609 km; 1.000 km = 0.621 mi
