= The Whittier =

- Whittier
- U.S. National Register of Historic Places
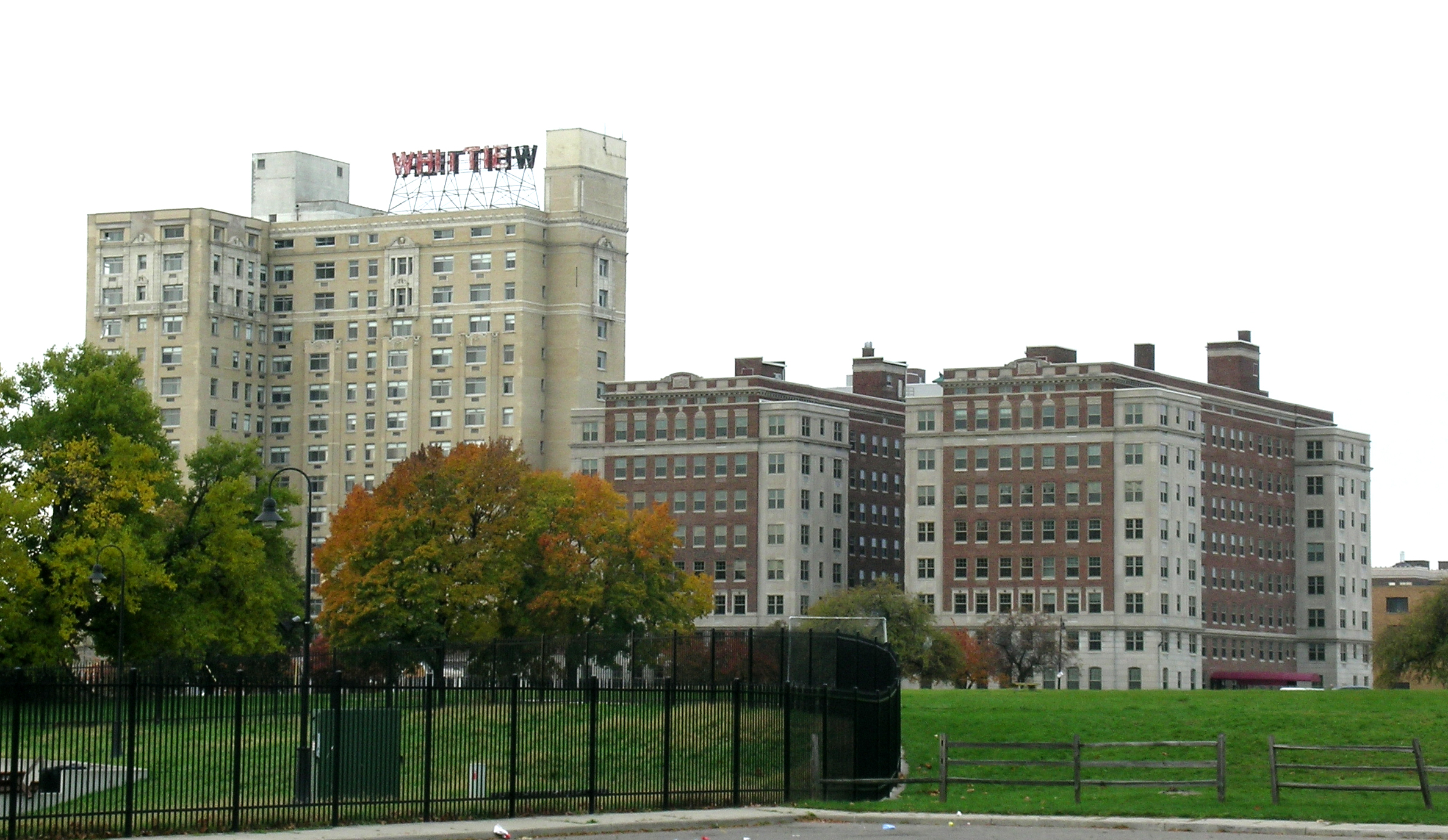
- Interactive map
- Location: 415 Burns Drive; Detroit, Michigan
- Coordinates: 42°21′17″N 82°59′23″W
- Built: 1922, 1926
- Architect: Charles N. Agree
- Architectural style: Late 19th and 20th Century Revivals, Renaissance
- MPS: East Jefferson Avenue Residential TR
- NRHP reference No.: 85002950
- Added to NRHP: October 9, 1985

The Whittier (also known as the Whittier Apartments) is a partially renovated high rise residential complex and former hotel located at 415 Burns Drive in Detroit, Michigan, on the Detroit River. It was listed on the National Register of Historic Places in 1985.

== History ==
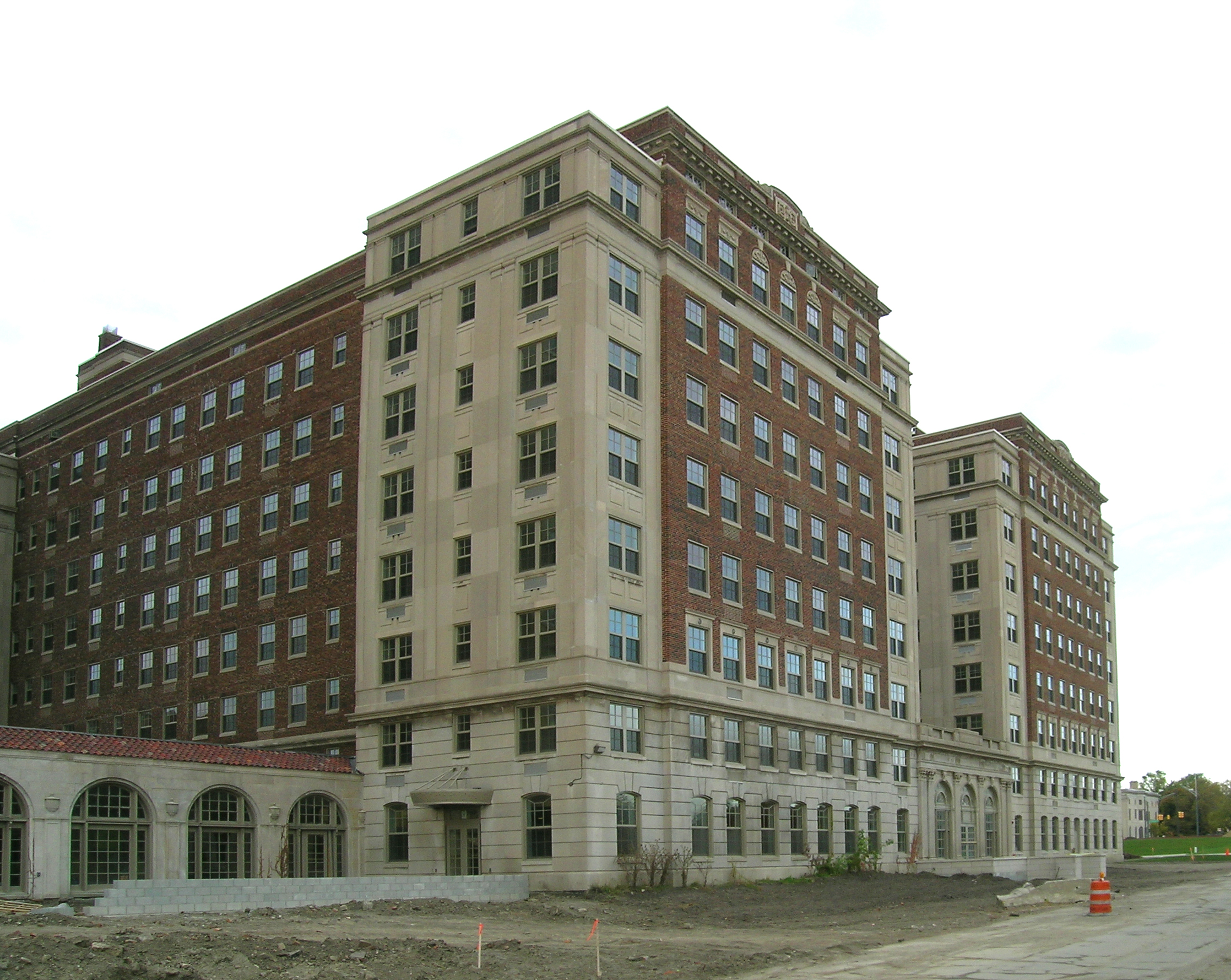
Whittier north

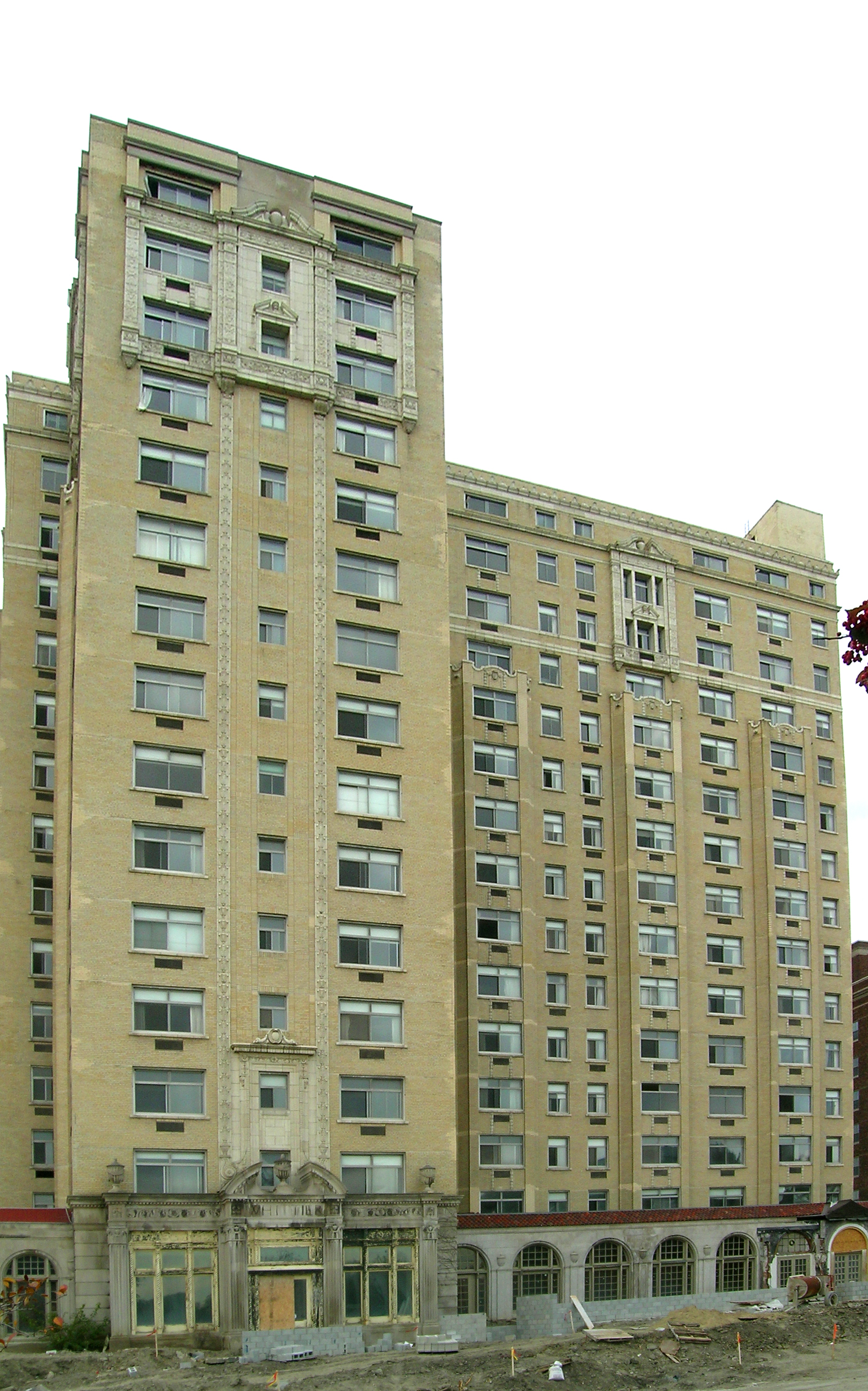
Whittier south

The Whittier was constructed as an apartment hotel, meaning that tenants could rent an apartment, yet have access to services typically provided by a hotel. The Whittier was built at a time when the population boom in Detroit increased demand for housing. The developer selected a site near the Detroit River, in an area that was, until then, primarily used for exclusive upper-class homes. Construction began in 1921, and ran until 1927.

Over the years, the luxury hotel attracted wealthy guests such as Horace Dodge, Eleanor Roosevelt, Mae West, Frank Sinatra and The Beatles. During Prohibition, the hotel's convenient access to the Detroit River and Canada made it popular with underworld types, including the Purple Gang.

The hotel changed hands many times, and was occupied until 2000 or 2001, when the last residents moved out. In June 2003, the building was purchased by Phoenix Communities, who refurbished the eight-story section into a senior citizen's living center, known as the Whittier Manor. Renovation of the fifteen-story tower has recently come to a deadlock.

== Description ==
Charles N. Agree designed the Whittier Hotel; it was the first of several large luxury hotels designed by the architect. Due to the soft, marshy ground, Agree used a slab foundation to support the hotel. The complex actually consists of two separate structures: an eight-story building to the north, and a larger fifteen-story Italian Renaissance style tower to the south.

The eight-story northern building is constructed from red brick and has regularly spaced windows. The first and second stories are faced with smooth stone, and feature a classical facade. This building originally contained 184 units, and was completed in 1922.

The fifteen-story southern building was completed in 1926. It is basically Italian Renaissance in style, and is built from buff brick with terra cotta trim in the upper floors. A modern entrance of a single story in height has been recently removed.

During the 1950s the exterior of the tower was altered

Both buildings are notable for the high quality of the interior and exterior finishes.
