= Belcrest Apartments (Detroit) =

- U.S. National Register of Historic Places
- Michigan State Historic Site
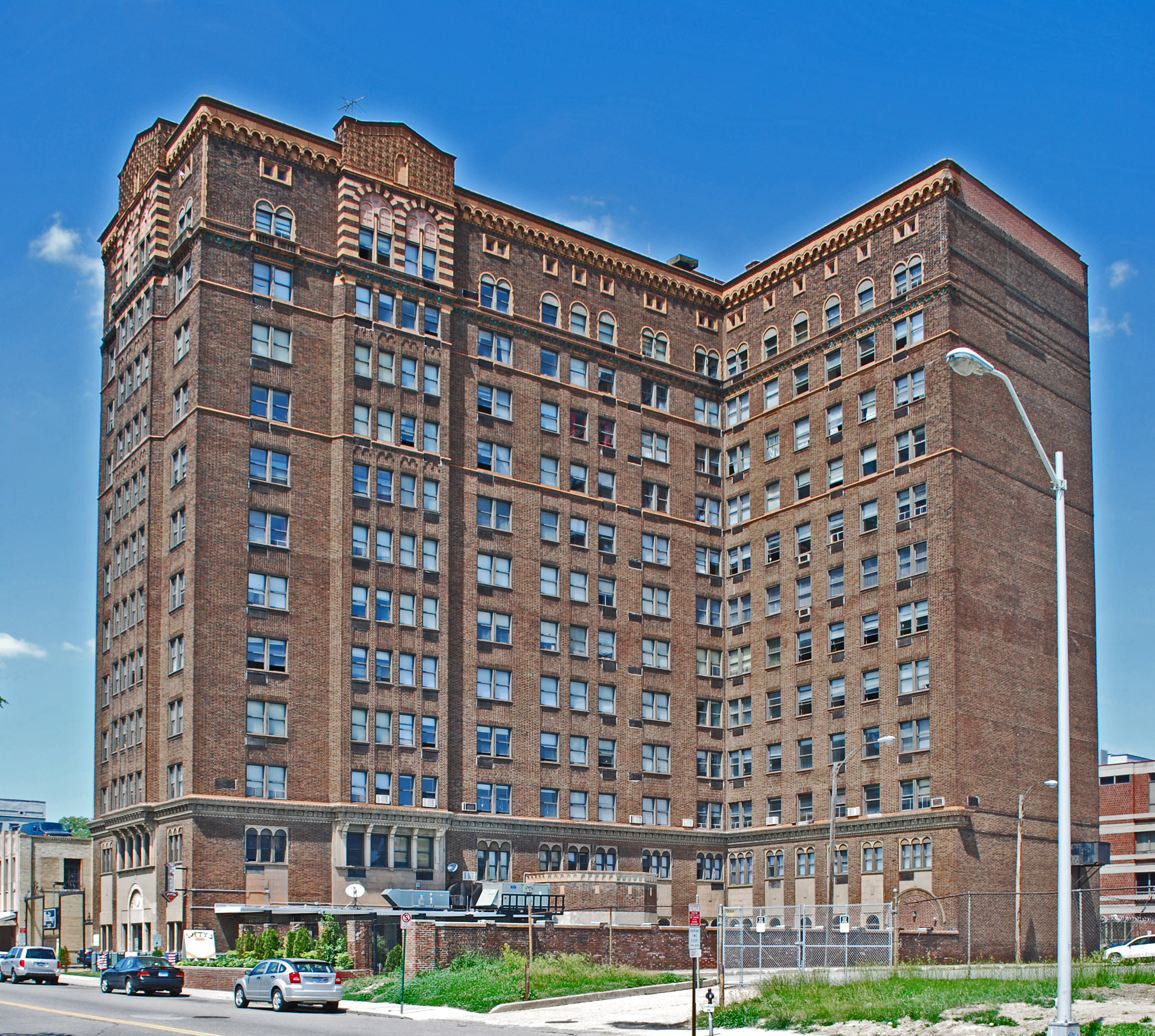
- Interactive map
- Location: 5440 Cass Avenue; Detroit, Michigan
- Coordinates: 42°21′36″N 83°4′7″W
- Built: 1926
- Architect: Charles N. Agree
- Architectural style: Renaissance revival
- NRHP reference No.: 84001851

Significant dates
- Added to NRHP: May 31, 1984
- Designated MSHS: November 30, 1983

Belcrest Hotel Apartments is an apartment building located at 5440 Cass Avenue in Midtown Detroit, Michigan. It was built in 1926 as the Belcrest Hotel, designated a Michigan State Historic Site in 1983, and listed on the National Register of Historic Places in 1984. It is significant as an early example of the apartment hotel development concept in Detroit, and a major early work of architect Charles N. Agree.

== History ==
The Belcrest Apartment Hotel was built in 1926 as a residential hotel, catering to wealthy tenants. The building exemplified what was, at the time, a novel style of living arrangement: an apartment building that offered amenities normally associated with a hotel. Daily maid service and a restaurant on the premises set this apart from a conventional apartment building. The building was developed by Jacob Singer and Max Hamburger, who hired Charles N. Agree as both architect and general contractor for the building. In 1929, Singer and Hamburger signed an agreement to make the Belcrest a part of the Albert Pick hotel chain.

In 1966, the building was converted into apartments. At some point the building was owned by the United States Department of Housing and Urban Development, who sold it to developers in 1983. The building was renovated in 1984, and offered apartments primarily to students of the nearby Wayne State University. The property was purchased by Detroit-based developer, Holcomb Development Company, in Fall of 2022 and a full renovation of all 140 units was completed in late 2023.

== Architecture ==
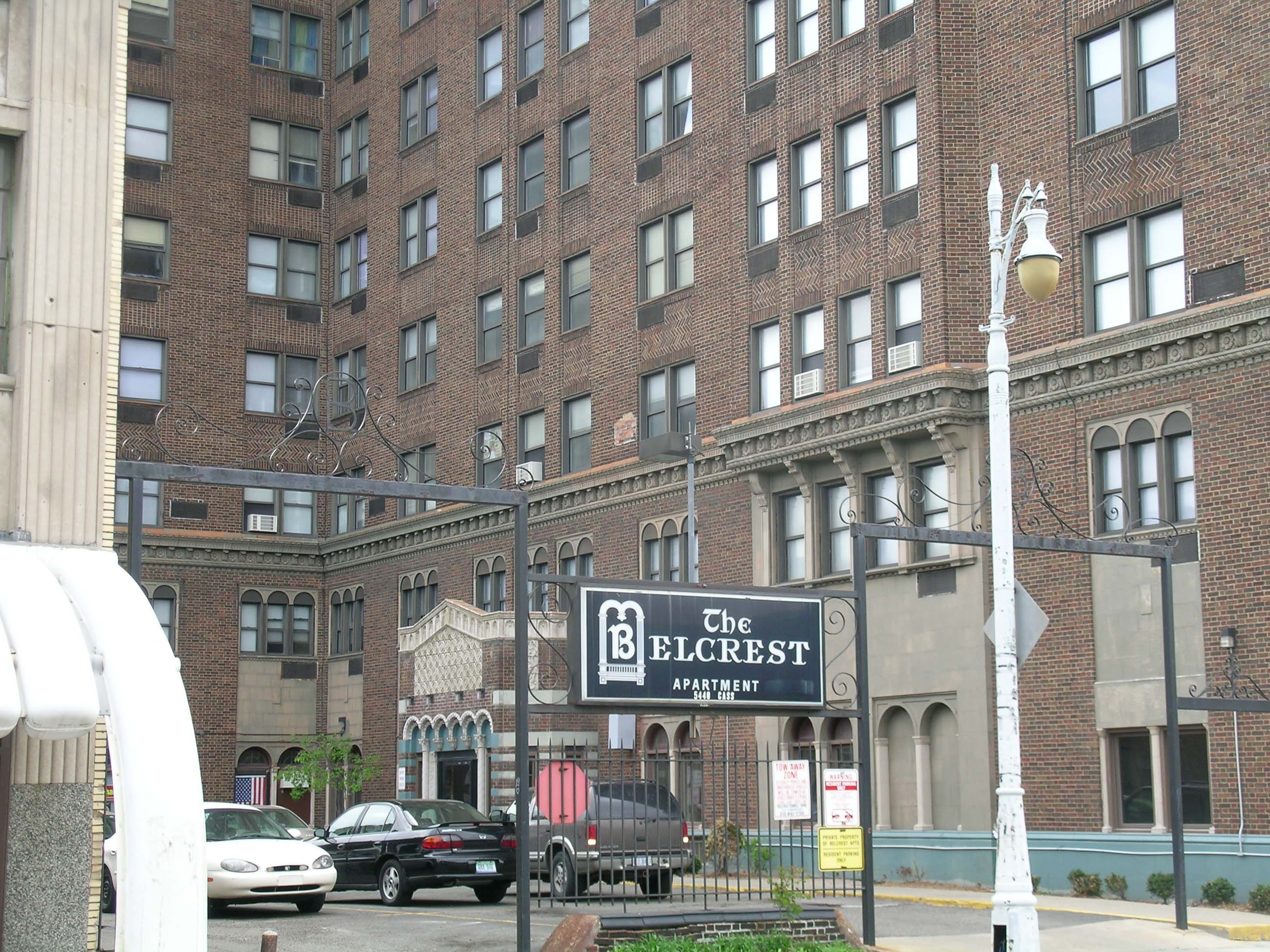
The Belcrest

The Belcrest is a twelve-story, T-shaped apartment building, constructed of concrete and steel and sheathed with brick and terra cotta. Three projecting bays surround the base of the T, emphasizing the vertical, and extend up through the cornice to end in an ornamented gable. The three bays have elaborate detail on the twelfth floor, containing alternating bands of brick and terra cotta, round-arched masonry window openings, and terra cotta diaperwork.

Terra cotta cornices on the third, eleventh, and top floors emphasize the horizontal. The grey and cream second-floor cornice is further embellished with dentils, rope molding, and acanthus leaf molding. The tan and dark brown eleventh-floor corniceline has green highlights, and breaks at terra cotta balconets beneath the twelfth-floor windows. The tan twelfth floor cornice is molded into the form of a series of arches and acanthus leaf brackets, topped with an acanthus leaf molding.

A gabled single story entry foyer echoes the form of the twelfth floor gables. The entryway is reached through original wrought iron entry gates.
