= Jefferson Avenue (Detroit) =

Road in Detroit, Michigan

- Interactive map of Jefferson Avenue
- Length: 63.71 mi (102.53 km)
- South end: Huron River in Brownstown
- Major junctions: M-1 / M-3 / M-10 in Detroit; I-375 in Detroit To M-102 in Grosse Pointe Shores; I-94 near Mount Clemens; M-59 near Mount Clemens
- North end: M-29 in New Baltimore

Jefferson Avenue is a 64-mile-long (103 km) scenic road along the eastern part of the Metro Detroit area in the southeast of the U.S. state of Michigan. It travels alongside Lake Erie, the Detroit River, and Lake St. Clair, and is a major link between Downtown Detroit, the neighborhoods of the Lower East Side and Southwest Detroit, and the suburban regions of Downriver and the Grosse Pointes. Jefferson is one of Detroit's five principal avenues along with Woodward, Michigan, Grand River, and Gratiot.

== History ==
Jefferson is one of five major Detroit avenues planned by Judge Augustus B. Woodward in 1805 that extend radially from downtown Detroit in differing directions. First surveyed in 1807, it was named Main Street. It was later renamed Jefferson Avenue after U.S. President Thomas Jefferson, who was a friend of Woodward. Jefferson Avenue was planned to extend due east of downtown, parallel to the Detroit River, but later additions to the road have extended it west of downtown as well, where it travels near the waterfront through the Downriver area.

== Route description ==
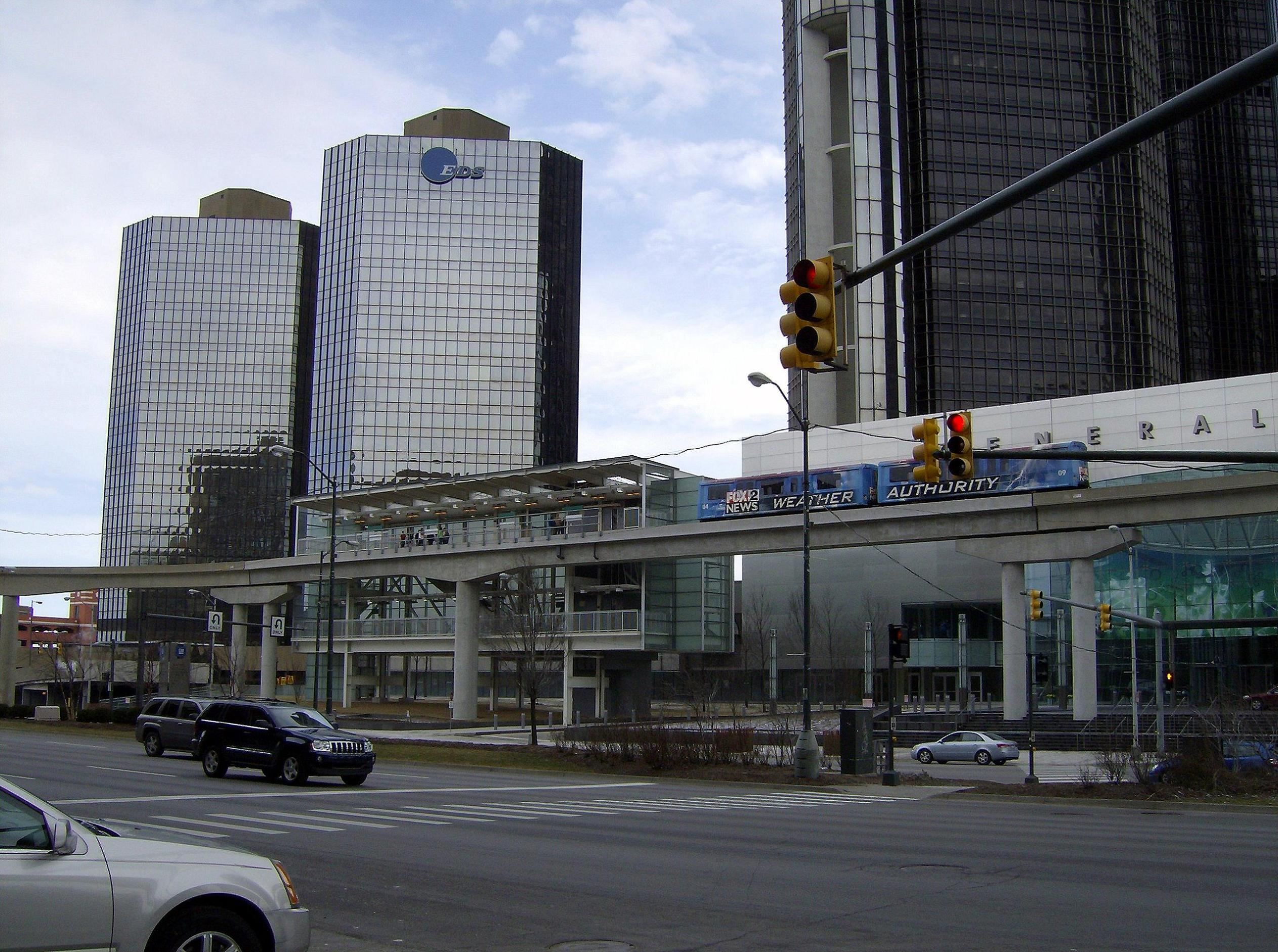
The Detroit People Mover's Renaissance Center station is on Jefferson Avenue.

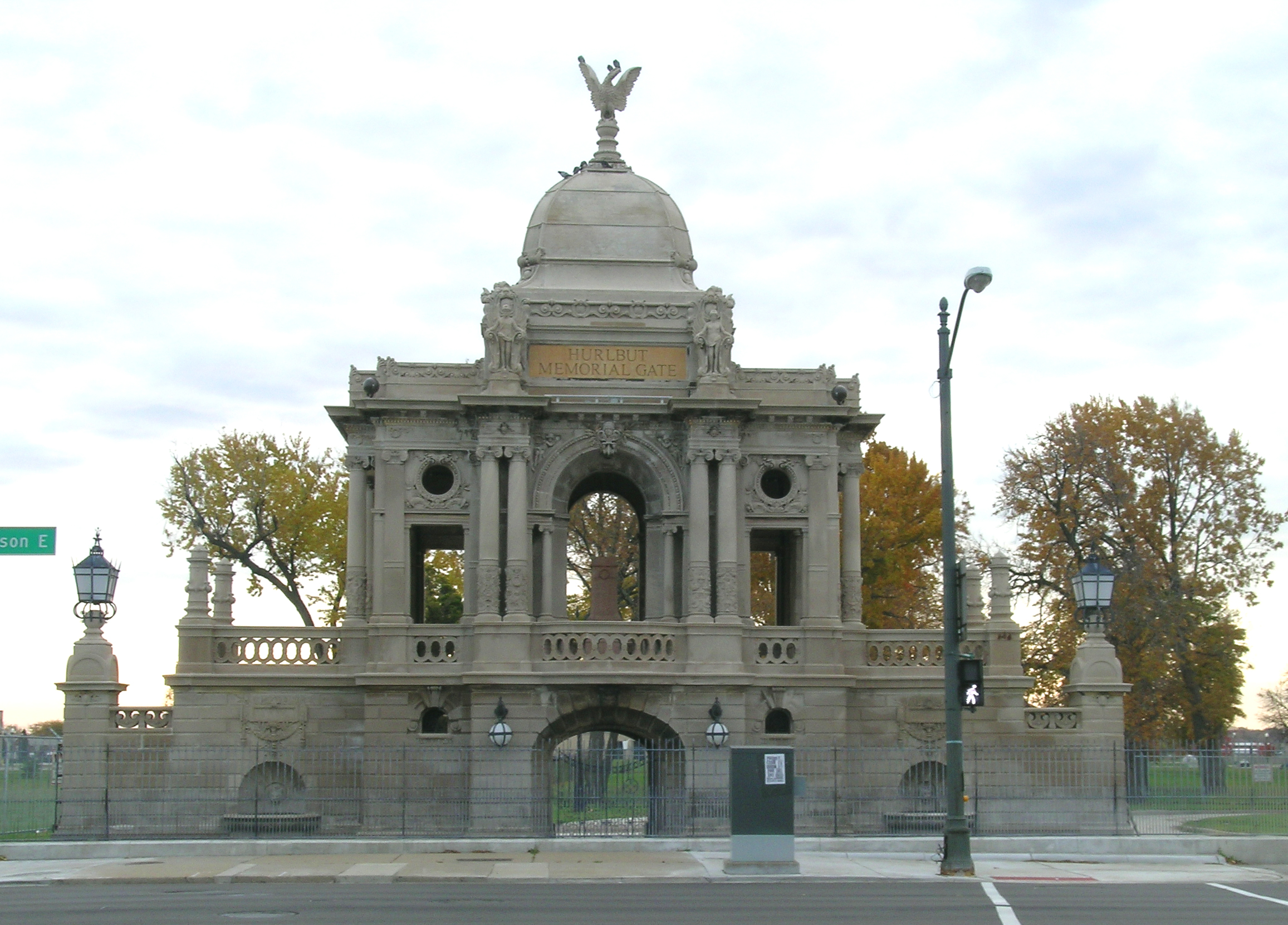
Chauncey Hurlbut Memorial Gate, Waterworks Park

Jefferson Avenue radiates east and west from Downtown Detroit, originating at an intersection with Woodward Avenue next to Hart Plaza. Eastward, Jefferson Avenue runs along the Renaissance Center, and intersects with the beginning of I-375 on the eastern edge of Downtown. There, it narrows from six lanes to five, and begins to include bike lanes which run to the city limits. Continuing east, Jefferson intersects with the MacArthur Bridge, the entrance to Belle Isle. Jefferson Avenue passes through the Eastside neighborhoods of West Village, Indian Village, and Jefferson-Chalmers. Jefferson Avenue continues through the suburb of Grosse Pointe, and its name changes to Lake Shore Drive alongside Lake St. Clair. Northward along the shore, Jefferson Avenue passes through St. Clair Shores and Chesterfield Township. Jefferson Avenue has a gap in its route at Selfridge Air National Guard Base. Jefferson Avenue's east end is at 23 Mile Road, near the boundary between Chesterfield Township and New Baltimore.

Westward from Downtown, Jefferson Avenue passes under the Huntington Place convention center, and is routed along the southern end of M-10. Jefferson Avenue travels south along the Detroit River, connecting parts of the Detroit Riverwalk. Parks located on the river side of Jefferson include the Ralph C. Wilson, Jr. Centennial Park and Riverside Park. Jefferson Avenue passes under the Ambassador Bridge and the Gordie Howe International Bridge, before crossing over the River Rouge to enter the city of River Rouge. Jefferson passes though the Downriver cities of Ecorse, Wyandotte (where it is known as Biddle Avenue), and Trenton. The western end of Jefferson Avenue is in Berlin Township at an intersection with Dixie Highway.

In downtown Detroit, the southern end of M-10 is routed along Jefferson to the corner of Randolph Street/M-3. From the corner of Randolph to the southern end of I-375 between Beaubien and St. Antoine streets, Jefferson is the extremely short, 0.015-mile-long (0.024 km), unsigned Business Spur I-375.

== Images ==
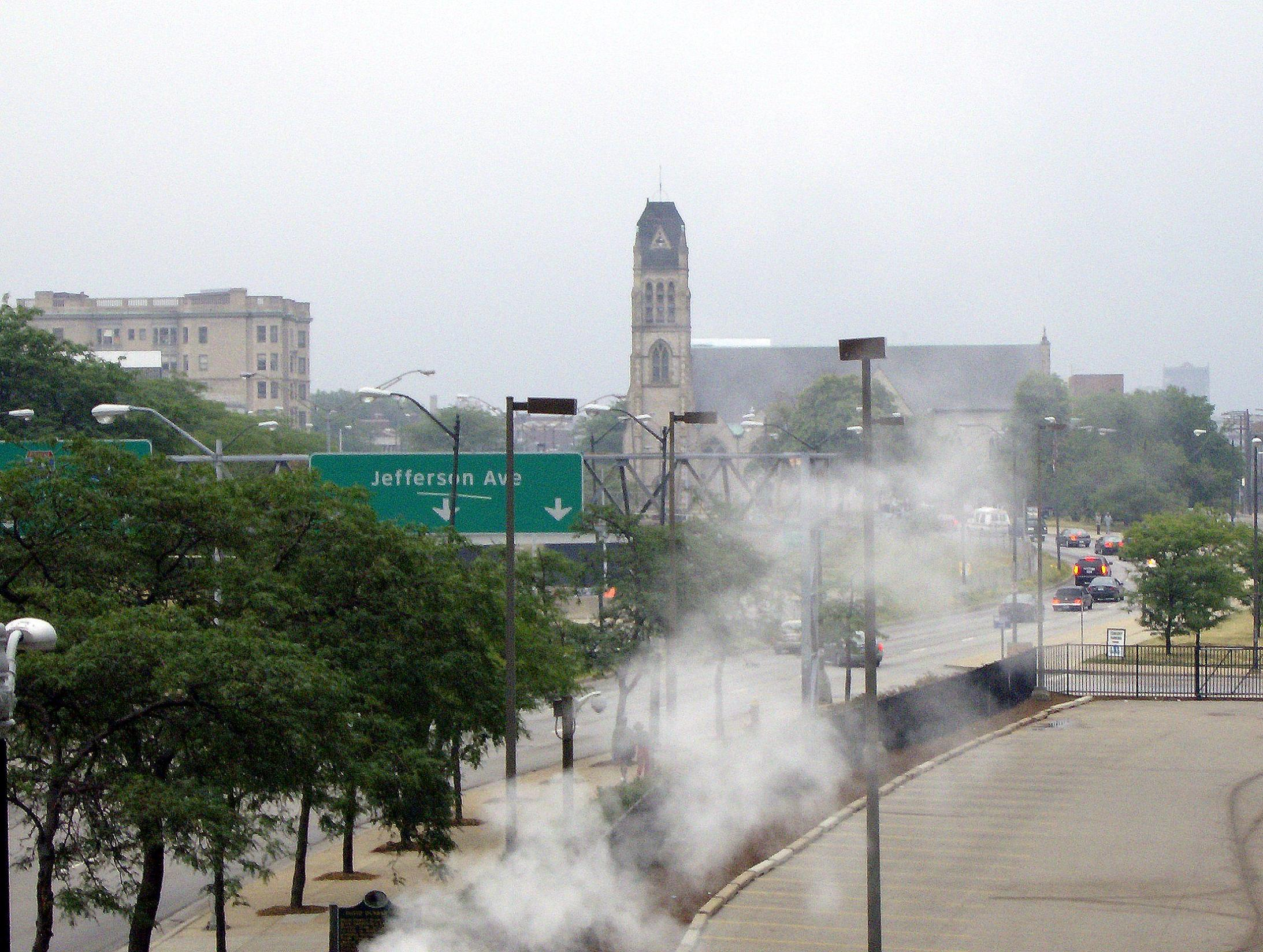
Jefferson Avenue in Detroit near the Chrysler Freeway

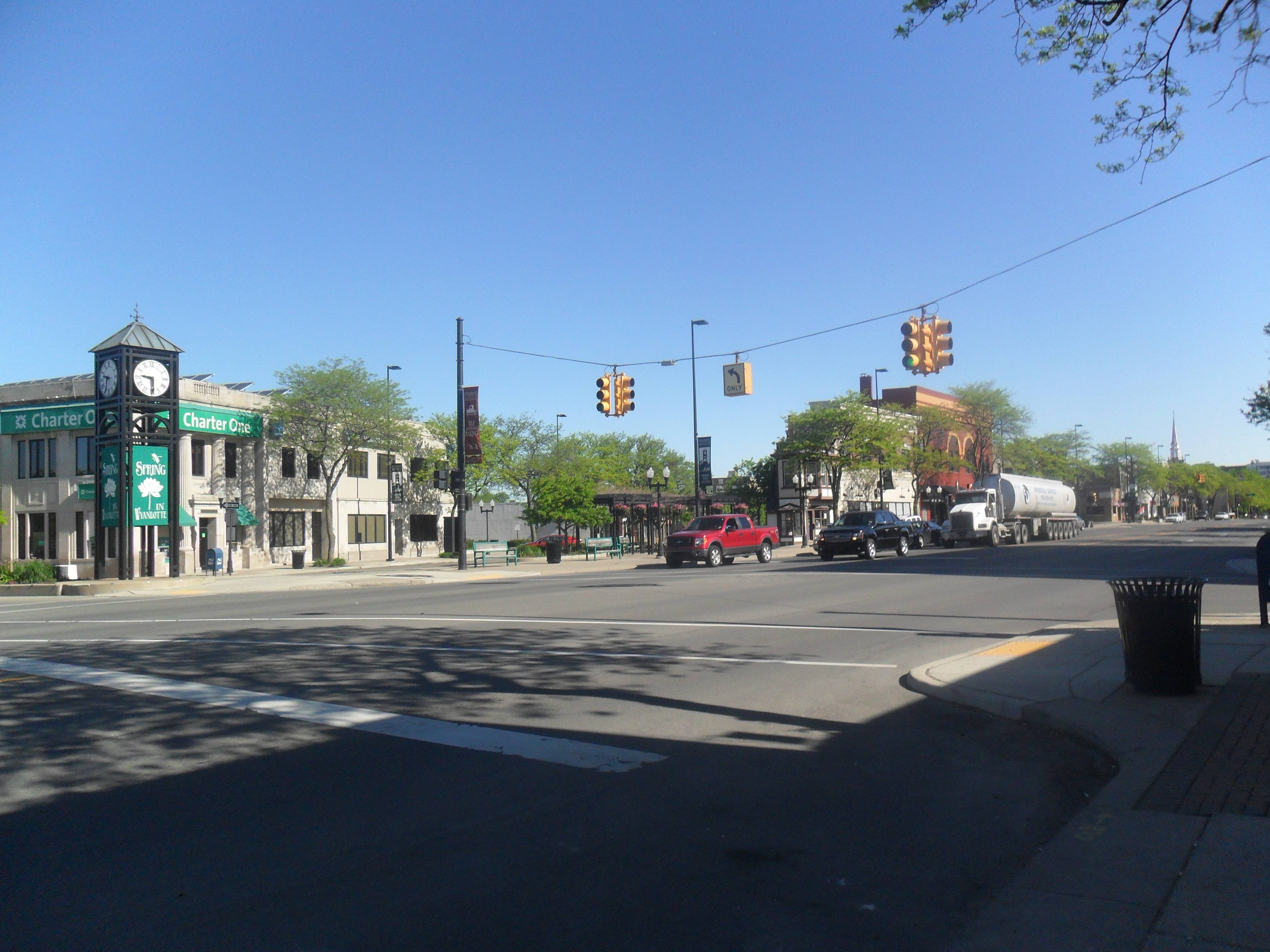
Biddle Avenue in Wyandotte

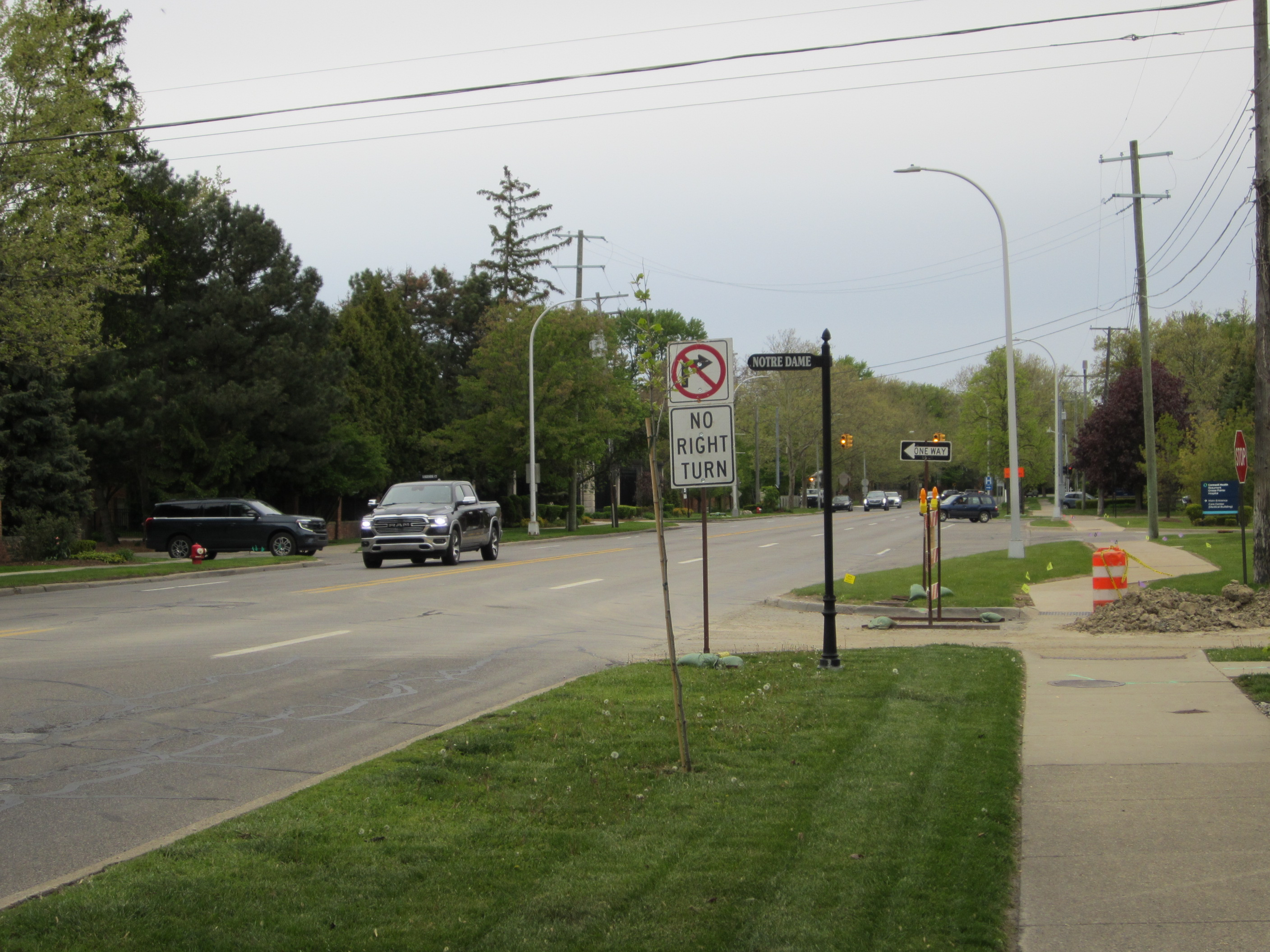
Jefferson Avenue in Grosse Pointe

== See also ==
- Transportation in metropolitan Detroit
- East Jefferson Avenue Residential District
