= Vanity Ballroom Building =

- U.S. National Register of Historic Places
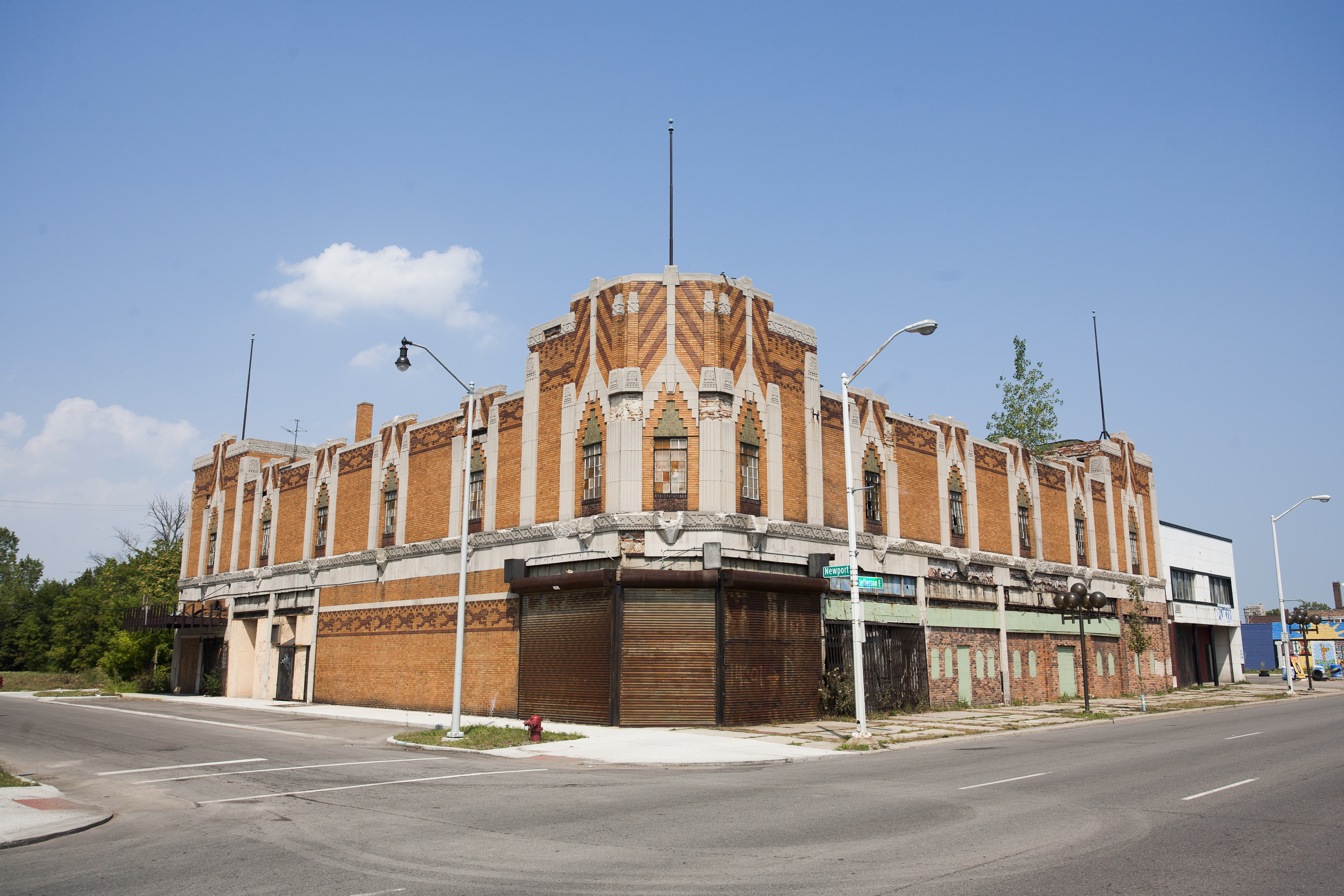
- Interactive map
- Location: 1024 Newport Street; Detroit, Michigan
- Coordinates: 42°22′20″N 82°56′46″W
- Built: 1929
- Architect: Charles N. Agree
- Architectural style: Art Deco
- NRHP reference No.: 82000556
- Added to NRHP: November 12, 1982

The Vanity Ballroom Building is a public building located at 1024 Newport Street (at Jefferson Avenue in the Jefferson-Chalmers Historic Business District) in Detroit, Michigan. It was listed on the National Register of Historic Places in 1982. Although the building is recorded as the last intact ballroom of the multiple Detroit dance halls that hosted big bands in the 1930s–50s, such claims ignore the abandoned yet still standing Grande Ballroom on Grand River Avenue.

== History ==
The Vanity Ballroom was designed in 1929 by Charles N. Agree as a flamboyant venue in which to socialize, dance and hear music. The ballroom was a major venue for bands of the 1930s and 1940s, such as those of Tommy Dorsey, Jimmy Dorsey, Duke Ellington, Benny Goodman, Red Nichols, Russ Morgan, Art Mooney, Woody Herman, and Pee Wee Hunt. The Vanity billed itself as "Detroit's most beautiful dance rendezvous". The ballroom was closed in 1958, but reopened in 1964 for one night a week. It was eventually completely shuttered, and although it played a bit part in the Eminem feature film 8 Mile in 2002, it remains closed and dilapidated.

== Description ==
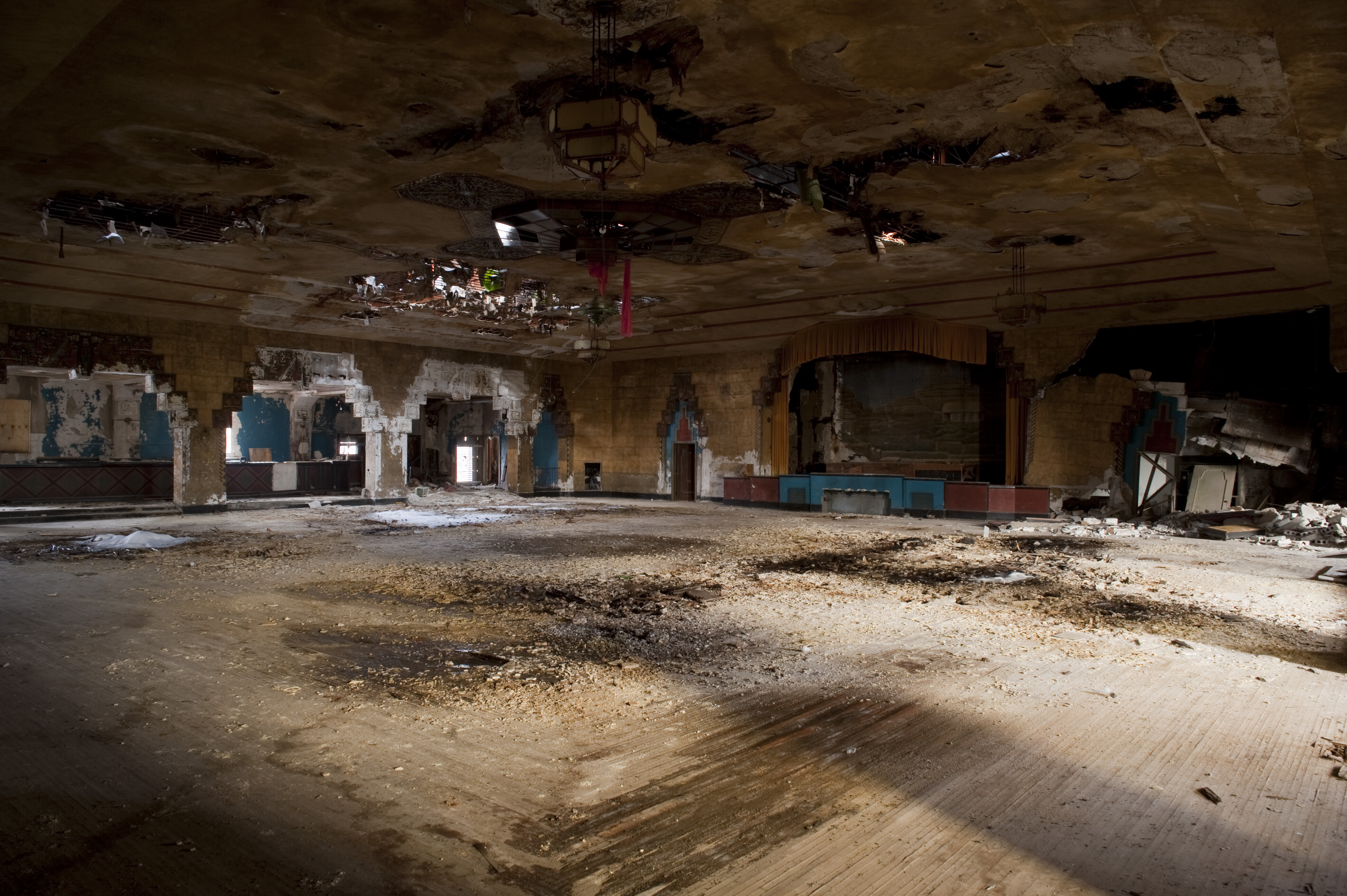
Dance floor of the Vanity Ballroom

The Vanity Ballroom is a two-story building originally containing five retail shops on the first floor and a ballroom on the second. It is built in the Art Deco style with an Aztec or Mayan Revival theme and measures 125 by 121 feet (38 by 37 m). It is constructed of steel and reinforced concrete and faced with brick. The bulk of the brickwork uses orange brick; this is complemented with darker brick and cast stones. There is a three-sided entrance pavilion at the corner of the structure, and the façades to either side (along both Jefferson Avenue and Newport Street) are nearly identical. These façades terminate in smaller entrance pavilions; all three pavilions are slightly taller than the rest of the façades and contain a geometric stone pattern near the top. The multi-paned windows on the second floor are flanked by pilasters and topped with Art Deco geometric designs echoing those of the Aztecs.

The ballroom was built to accommodate 1,000 couples, and has a 5,600-square-foot (520 m^{2}) maple dance floor, a stage or bandstand, and a promenade on three sides. The dance floor was built on springs which intentionally compressed under the weight of the people who danced on it, giving the dancers a bounce as they moved. The backdrop of the stage features a scene representing Chichen Itza.

Three of the retail shops on the first floor also had interiors designed by Agree; their interiors echo the Art Deco Aztec theme of the exterior. Within the retail spaces, Agree used elements such as wood and marble trim and terrazzo floors.

The exteriors of these first-floor stores have been substantially changed with many of the Mayan flavored elements torn off the façade.
