= Pilgrim and Puritan Apartment Complex =

- U.S. National Register of Historic Places
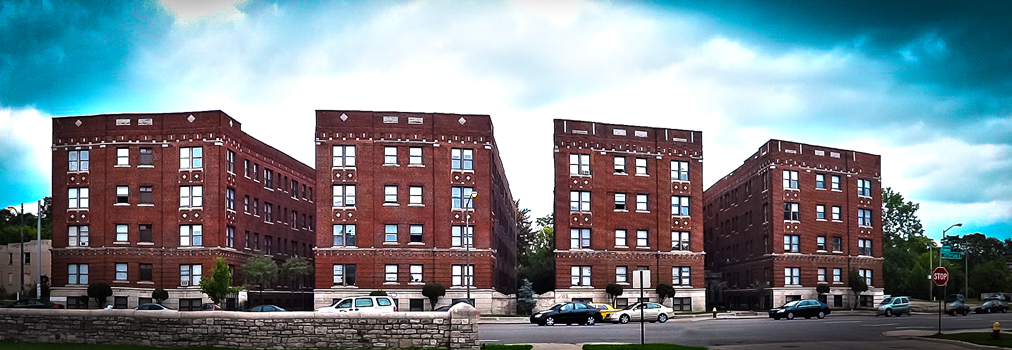
- Interactive map
- Location: 9303–9333 E. Jefferson Ave. Detroit, Michigan
- Coordinates: 42°21′34″N 82°59′4″W
- Built: 1924
- Architect: Charles N. Agree
- Architectural style: Neoclassical / Commercial Brick
- NRHP reference No.: 14000514
- Added to NRHP: August 25, 2014

The Pilgrim and Puritan Apartment Complex is a historic apartment building located at 9303–9333 East Jefferson Avenue in Detroit, Michigan. It was listed on the National Register of Historic Places in 2014. It is a large and intact example of a courtyard style of apartment building complex, not found elsewhere on East Jefferson Avenue. The Pilgrim and Puritan provided housing for Detroit's growing professional and middle-class during a time when the surrounding area was being developed with luxury apartment buildings.

== History ==
Harry Silverman was born in Romania and emigrated to Brooklyn, New York in 1905 at the age of eighteen. He trained as a building contractor, and in 1912 moved to Detroit and in 1913 started his own firm where he developed and quickly sold apartment building complexes. John B. Whitley was a born in Halifax, England, and came to Detroit in 1915 at the age of 35. There he opened his own real estate firm. Both Silverman and Whitley were Masons, which is presumably how they met. In 1924, the two men formed a partnership to construct a trio of apartment buildings next to each other: the Pilgrim, the Puritan, and the Plymouth (now demolished).

Silverman and Whitley brought in architect Charles N. Agree to design the apartment complexes, and construction was completed in 1924. In 1925, Silverman sold his interest to Whitley, ending their partnership. The first residents of the apartment Complex were Detroit's rising professional and middle class, and included a number of salesmen, executives, clerks, teachers, doctors and nurses. The buildings have continued in use as apartments since construction. The Plymouth was demolished in the mid-1980s, while the Pilgrim and Puritan were renovated about the same time. There are plans for a second rehabilitation of the Pilgrim and Puritan.

== Description ==
The Pilgrim and Puritan Apartment Complex consists of two nearly identical U-shaped four story red brick apartment buildings with flat roofs. The center entrance is reached through the courtyard formed by the U. Neoclassical and Commercial Brick elements are used on the buildings in an asymmetrical way to create an overall symmetric appearance. The raised basement portion of the building is clad with limestone, and red brick walls (rusticated on the first floor) extend above. A short wall with fencing is between the two.

Other images

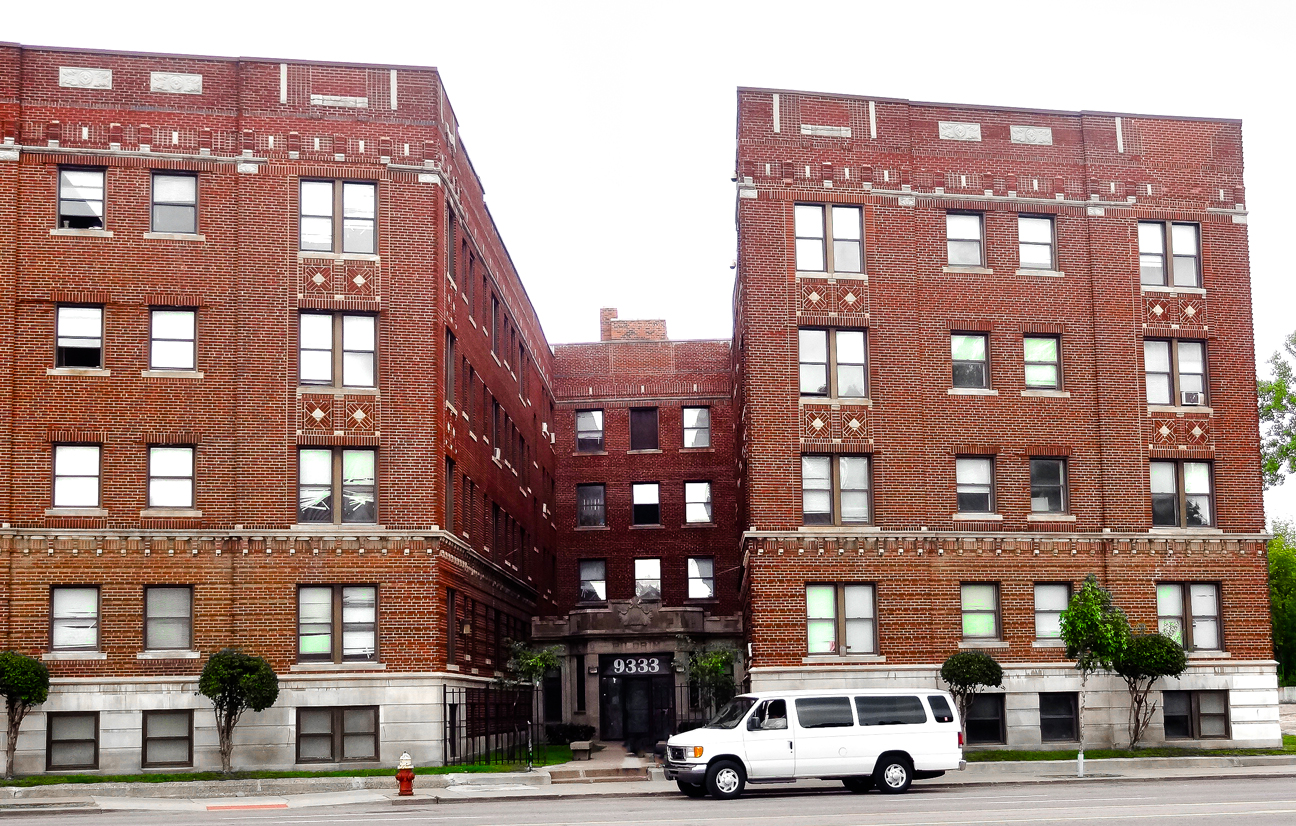

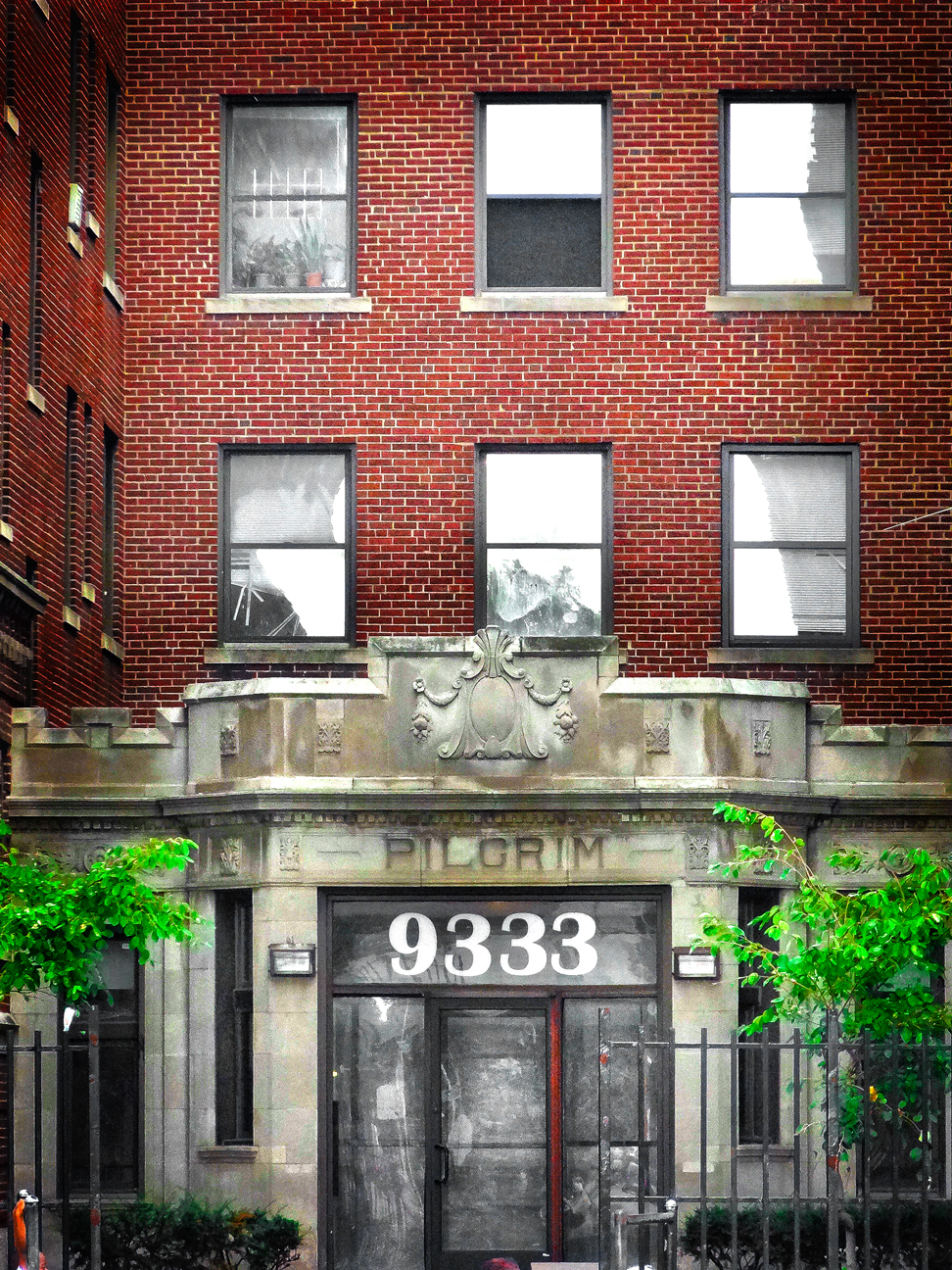

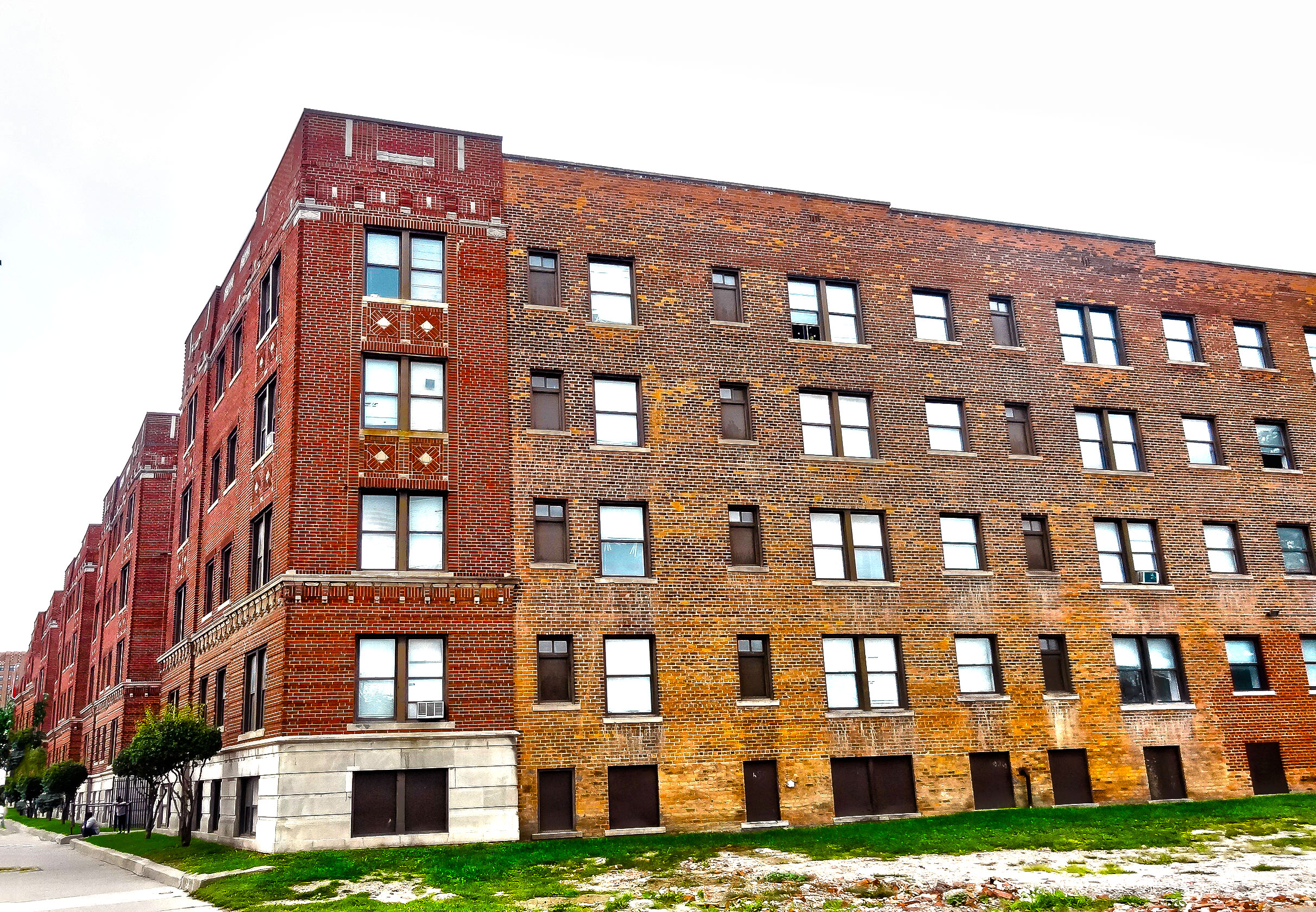

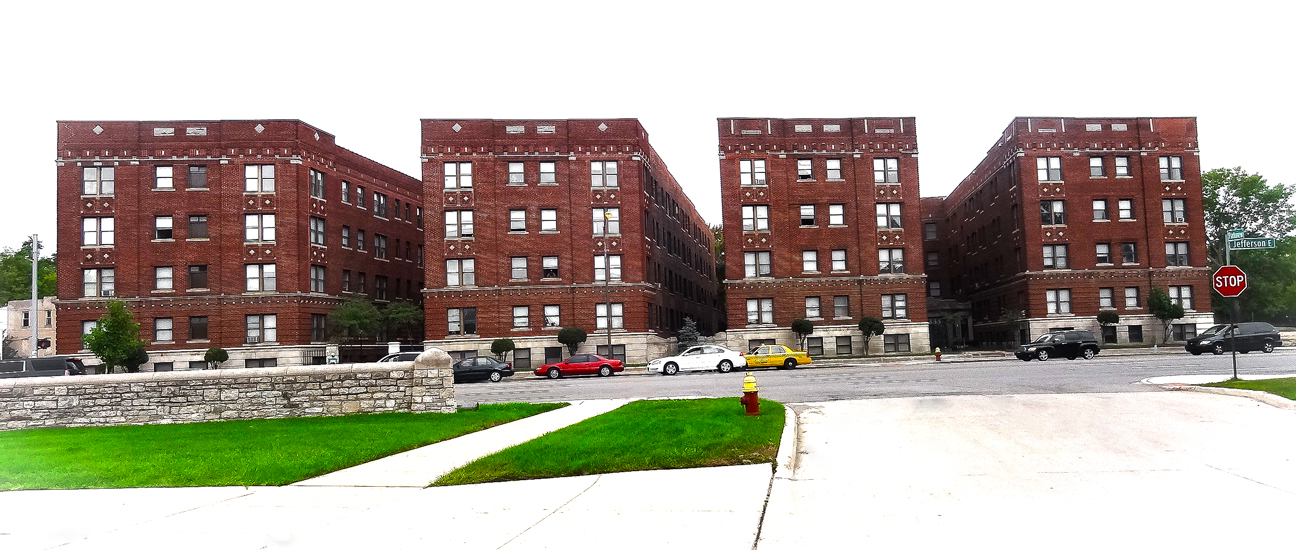

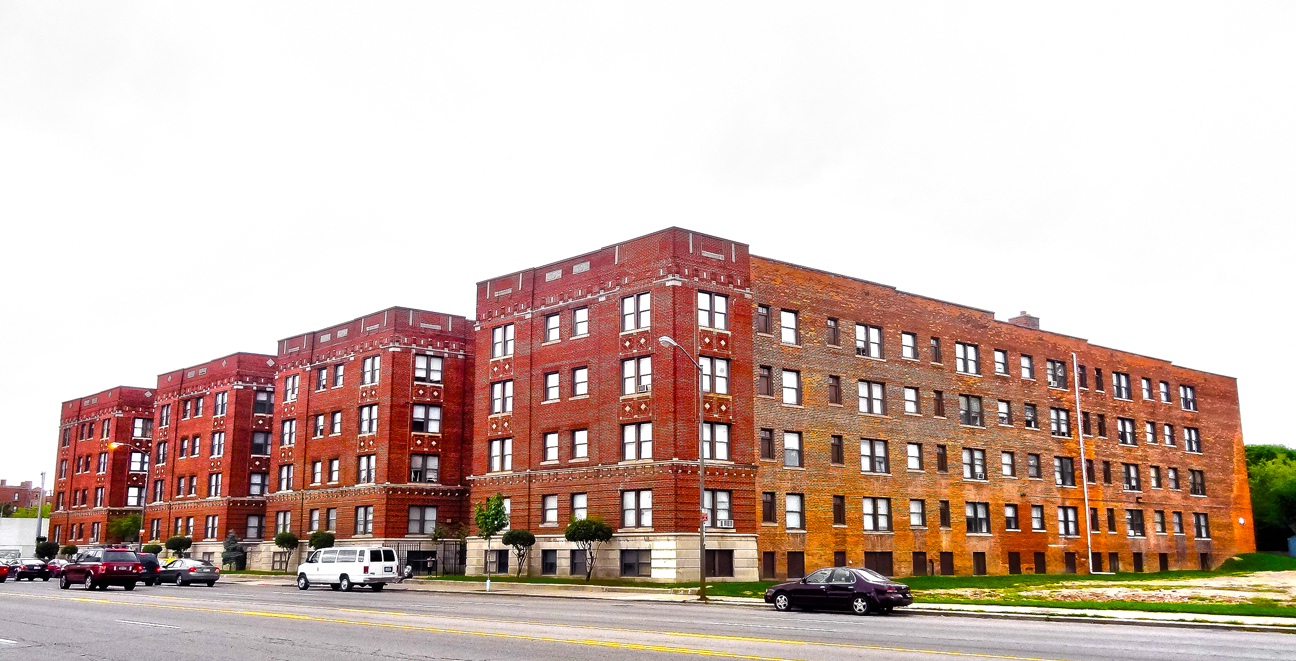

== See also ==
- National Register of Historic Places listings in Detroit, Michigan
