= Chrysler Freeway =

The Chrysler Freeway is the name given to a freeway in the Detroit area. It is composed of:

- Interstate 375 (Michigan) south of the junction with the Fisher Freeway
- Interstate 75 in Michigan north of the junction with the Fisher Freeway
