= Charles N. Agree =

American architect

Charles Nathanial Agree (April 18, 1897 – March 10, 1982) was an American architect in Detroit, Michigan.

== Early life and education ==
Agree moved to Detroit in 1909 at the age of 12. He opened his firm in 1917 after graduating from the Detroit Y.M.C.A. Technical School.

== Career ==
His first major commission was in 1921 to build the Whittier Hotel near the bank of the Detroit River. He later went on to design many office buildings, theaters, and ballrooms. Agree was one of the Detroit architects of the 1920s and 1930s who utilized the services of architectural sculptor Corrado Parducci.

As architecture changed by the 1960s, so did Agree's commissions. He began designing many modern-style malls. In addition to the office in the Book Tower, Agree's firm later opened an office on McNichols Road in Detroit and then a suburban office in Bloomfield Hills.

Several Agree-designed buildings have been plundered by architectural scavengers. These include the Vanity Ballroom, where several Mayan-Deco panels were torn off, and the Grande Ballroom, which brought rock band MC5 into fame, which has sat empty since closing in 1972.

== Agree-designed buildings ==
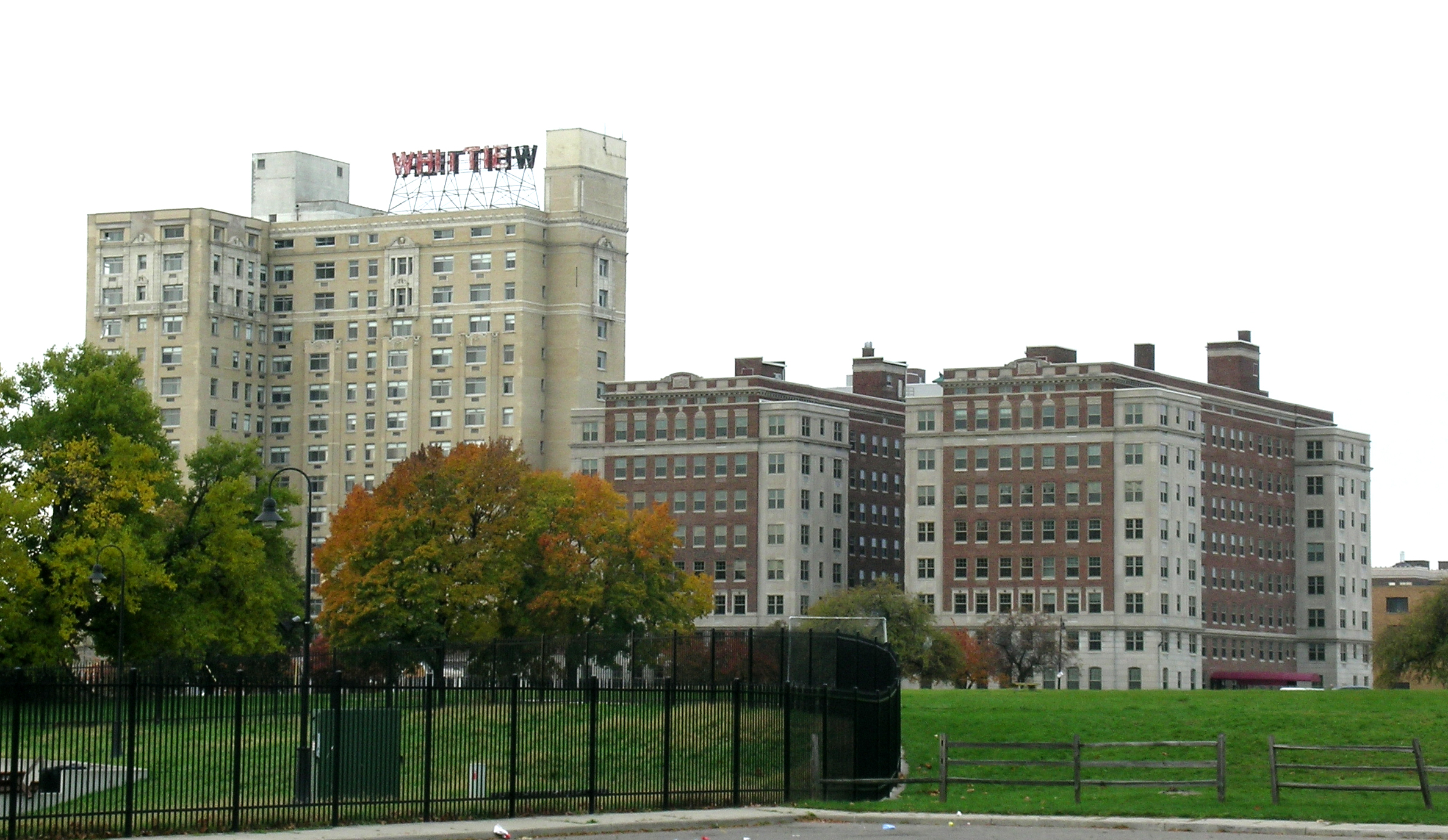
Whittier Hotel

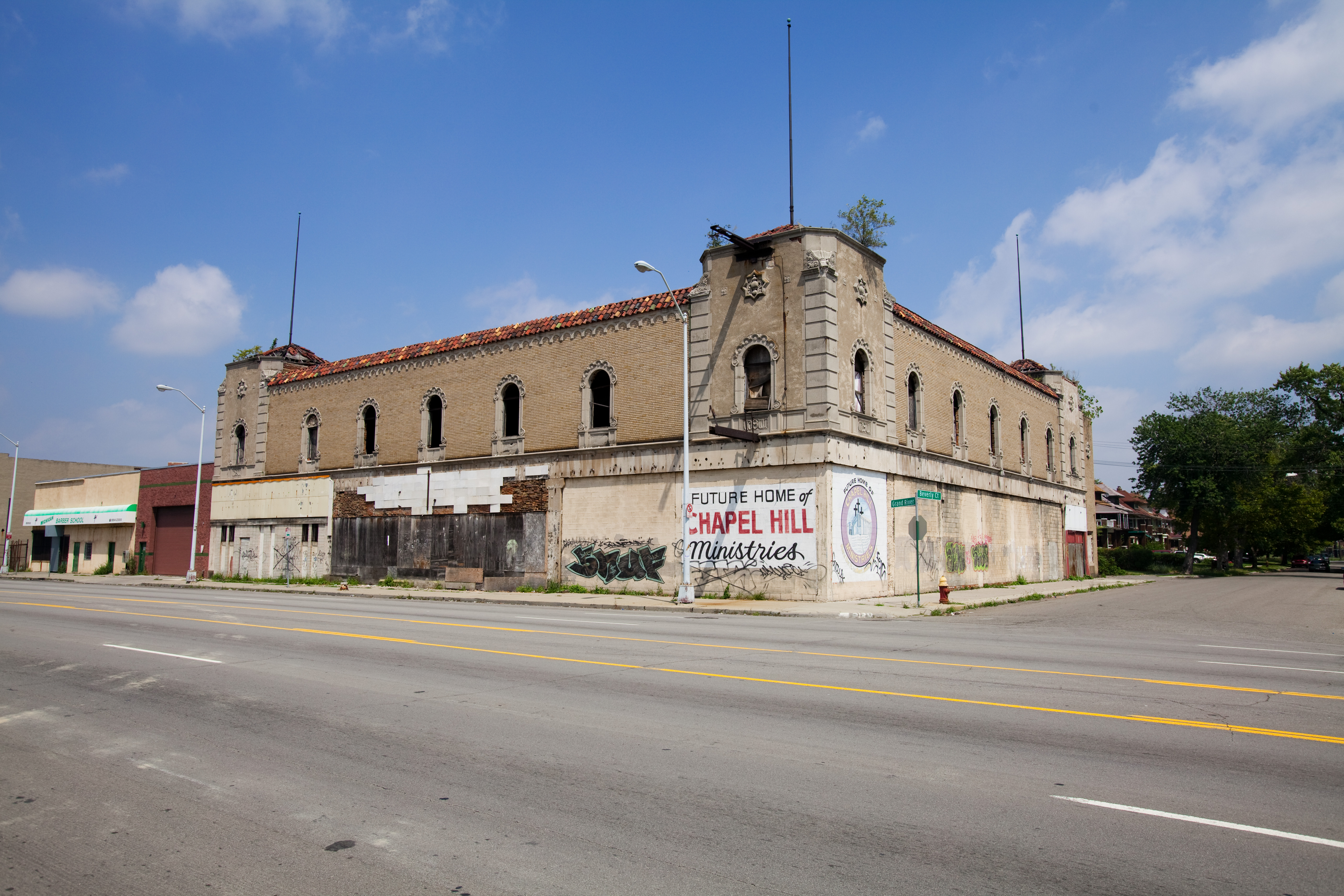
Grande Ballroom

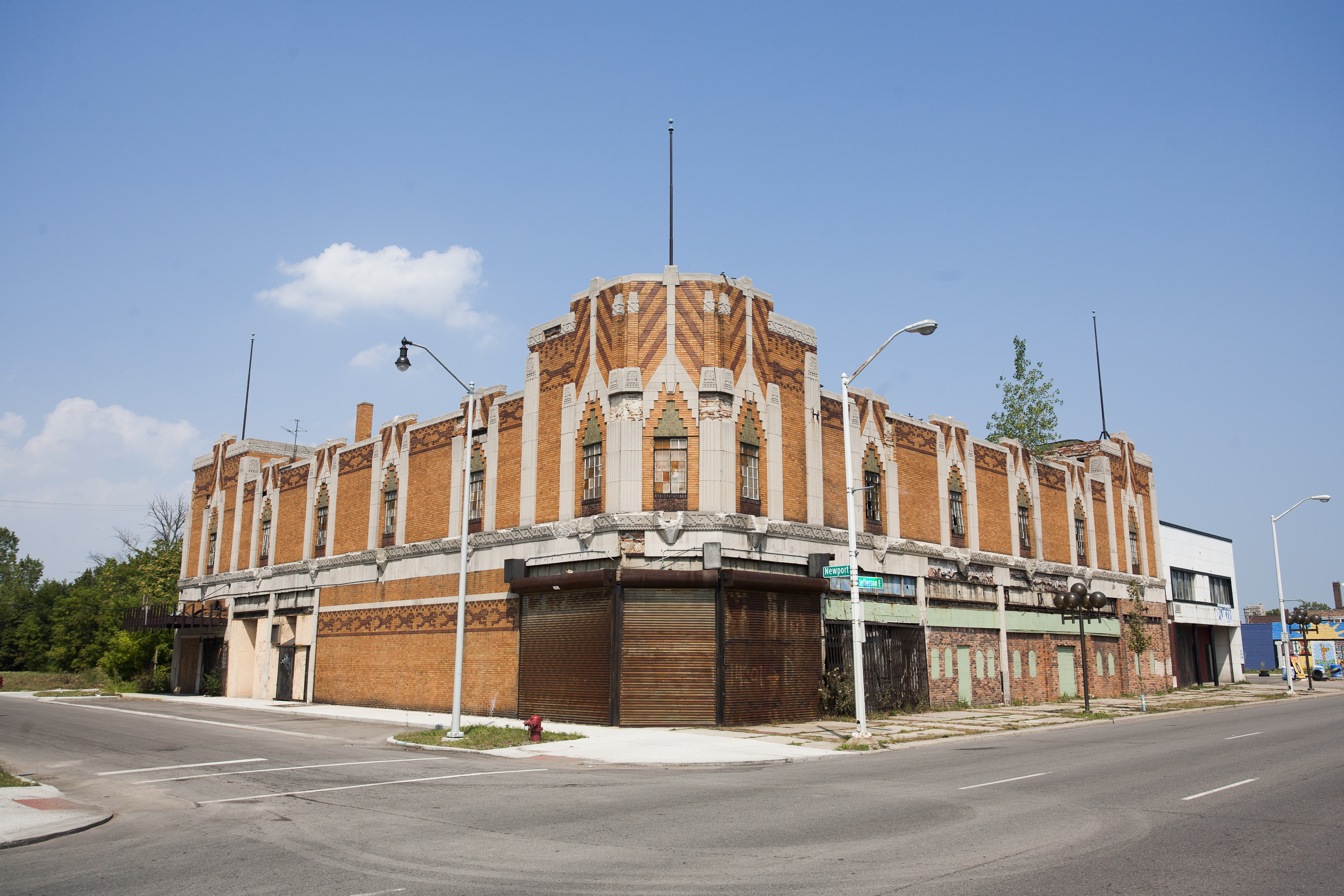
Vanity Ballroom

All buildings are located in Detroit, unless otherwise indicated.

- Whittier Hotel, 1921–1927
- Pilgrim and Puritan Apartment Complex, 1924
- Belcrest Apartments (previously Belcrest Hotel), 1926
- Grande Ballroom, 1928
- Vanity Ballroom, 1929
- Harpos Concert Theatre, 1939
- Nadell Furs Building, 1944
- Southgate Shopping Center, located in Southgate, Michigan, 1957
- Oakland Mall, Troy, Michigan 1968
- Panama City Mall, located in Panama City, Florida
