= Pier Park (Florida) =

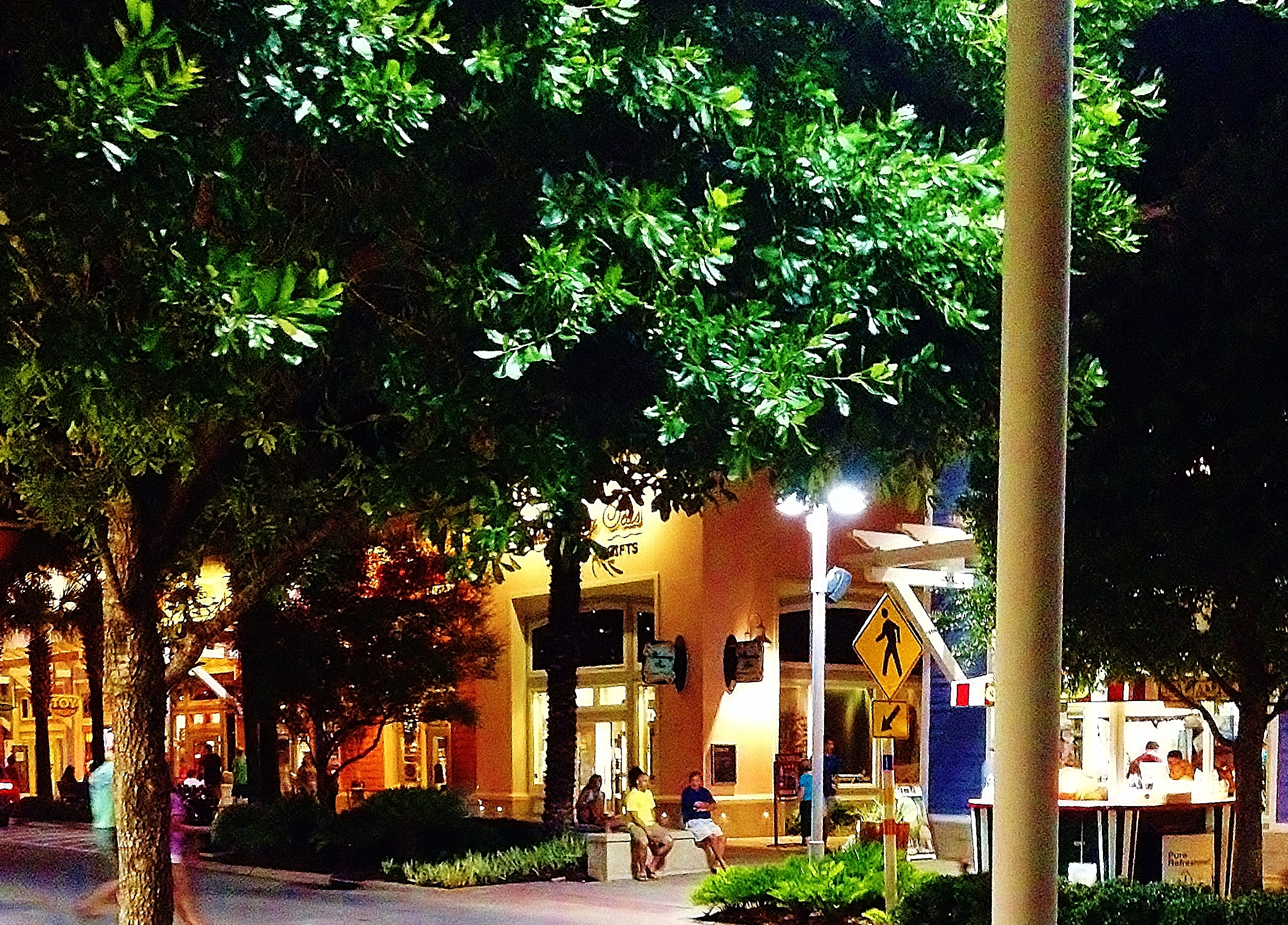
- Location: Panama City Beach, Florida, United States
- Coordinates: 30.21812°N 85.87347°W
- Opened: February 14, 2008
- Developer: Simon Property Group
- Manager: Simon Property Group
- Owner: Simon Property Group (65.6%)
- Num. of stores: 141
- Num. of anchor tenants: 3
- Floor area: 895,974 square feet (83,238.7 square meters)
- Floors: 1
- Website: www.simon.com/mall/pier-park

Pier Park is a lifestyle center in Panama City Beach, Florida. It opened in 2008 and features Dillard's, J. C. Penney, and Target as anchor stores.

== History ==
In the late 1990s to early 2000s, there were talks about an outdoor shopping complex in Panama City Beach that would be adjacent to the Gulf Front with retail stores, dining options, and a movie theatre. The Pier Park project officially broke ground in 2002 with a 5 to 6-year timeline for completion. It neared completion in late 2007 for a Spring 2008 opening date. Pier Park officially opened on February 14, 2008. Among the first stores to open were anchor stores including Dillard's, J. C. Penney, and Target, all of which are still in operation. Other tenants include Jimmy Buffett's Margaritaville restaurant, Buffalo Wild Wings, Marble Slab Creamery, Old Navy, Five Guys Burgers and Fries, Victoria's Secret and Dick's Last Resort, and a movie theater owned by Santikos Theatres (formerly Southern Theatres), The Grand 16, which features IMAX 3D as well as RealD 3D. Forever 21 opened in the former Borders, which closed with the rest of the chain in 2011.

Forever 21 permanently closed its Pier Park location in early 2025 following the company’s Chapter 11 bankruptcy filing and subsequent liquidation of its remaining 350 U.S. stores. All Forever 21 locations in the United States were closed by May 1, 2025.

On January 21, 2021, Nike Factory Outlet closed its location at Pier Park.

The opening of Pier Park led to many other developments in the area, including a Walmart store, an adjacent strip mall called Pier Park West, and a second shopping center complex called Pier Park North. Pier Park West contains GameStop, Dickey's Barbecue Pit, Jimmy John's, and Chipotle. Pier Park North, completed in 2015, is home to Bealls Outlet, Five Below, Dick's Sporting Goods, Ross Dress For Less, The Fresh Market, PetSmart, Cost Plus World Market, Bed Bath & Beyond, Rooms To Go, Chili's, Texas Roadhouse, Wayback Burgers, and Jersey Mike's Subs. A fourth development Pier Park East is in the works to include an extension of the current Pier Park with more retail, an indoor family entertainment center, a hotel, and residential units, although construction has yet to begin. As of 2022, there has been no further announcement regarding this project with some speculation that ongoing COVID-19 pandemic putting this project to a halt. In December 2023, The St. Joe Company announced new developments for the proposed former Pier Park East location behind Walmart. A Topgolf venue is set to be built, making it Florida's 10th Topgolf location. Additionally, the Pirates Voyage Dinner and Show, owned by entertainer Dolly Parton, will also be part of the development right next to Pier Park West. Both attractions are slated to open in 2025.
