= List of rolling stock manufacturers =

Throughout railroad history, many manufacturing companies have come and gone. This is a list of companies that manufactured railroad cars and other rolling stock. Most of these companies built both passenger and freight equipment and no distinction is made between the two for the purposes of this list.

== Algeria ==
- Cital
- Ferrovial

== Argentina ==
- Astarsa
- COMETARSA
- Emepa Group
- Emprendimientos Ferroviarios
- Fabricaciones Militares
- Fábrica Argentina de Locomotoras
- Fábrica Argentina de Vagones y Silos
- Materfer
- SABB S.A.
- TecnoTren
- PINAT EDO srl

== Australia ==
- Alstom Australia
- Downer Rail
- UGL Rail

== Azerbaijan ==
- Baku Carriage Repair Factory
- Baku Metro (Assembly, Modernization and Repair)
- STP-Wagon-Building Factory

== Belgium ==
- BN Bombardier Brugge

== Brazil ==
- Alstom
- Andrade Gutierrez
- Bom Sinal
- CAF
- Marcopolo Rail
- COBRASMA

== Bulgaria ==
- VRZ Karlovo
- Express Service Ltd

== Canada ==
- Alstom
- ARS Canada Rolling Stock
- Arva Industries
- Napanee Industries, Napanee, Ontario
- National Steel Car, Hamilton, Ontario
- Procor, Oakville, Ontario
- Railwest Manufacturing, Squamish, British Columbia
- Woodstock Precision Machining Inc
- Enertec Rail Equipment
- Marine Industries
- TrentonWorks

== China ==
- CRRC
- SJJ Railway Material & Supply, China

== Croatia ==
- Končar
- Đuro Đaković

== Czechia ==
- Škoda Transportation
- Alstom, Czech
- CZ Loko

== Egypt ==
- Arab Organization for Industrialization (Semaf)
- Metallurgical Industry holding (El-Nasr Forging Company)
- Neric.

== Finland ==
- Alstom
- Škoda Transtech

== France ==
- Alstom
- Faiveley Transport
- Lohr Industrie
- SEMT Pielstick
- Socofer
- Titagarh Wagons AFR

== Germany ==
- Siemens Mobility
- Alstom
- WBN Waggonbau Niesky GmbH

== Greece ==
- Alstom, Greece
- Hellenic Shipyards Co.
- Kioleides
- Piraeus Railway Works

== India ==
- Abrol Engg Co
- Airflow Equipments
- Amtek Railcar Industries
- BEML Limited (a government of India Enterprise)
- BESCO Limited
- Bharat Wagon and Engineering (a government of India Enterprise)
- BHEL (a government of India Enterprise)
- Braithwaite & Co.
- Burn Standard Company
- CREWPL
- Hindusthan Engineering & Industries
- Hind Rectifiers
- Integral Coach Factory Chennai (a government of India Enterprise)
- Jessop & Company
- Jupiter Wagons
- Medha Servo Drives
- Metlord Alloys Private Limited, Chennai
- Modern Coach Factory, Raebareli (a government of India Enterprise)
- Rail Coach Factory, Kapurthala (a government of India Enterprise)
- Rail Vikas Nigam Limited (a government of India Enterprise)
- Rail Wheel Factory, Bangalore (a government of India Enterprise)
- Rail Wheel Plant (a government of India Enterprise)
- Forged Wheel Plant, Aihar, UP
- SAIL RITES Bengal Wagon Industry Private Limited (a joint venture between Government of India Enterprises)
- Stone India
- Trident auto components pvt ltd
- Texmaco Rail & Engineering
- Titagarh Wagons
- SAN Engineering & Locomotive Co
- Universal Engineers Chennai Pvt Ltd
- Kin Railway Equipment Pvt Ltd

== Indonesia ==
- Industri Kereta Api

== Iran ==
- Isfahan Kafriz
- Tehran Wagon Manufacturing Co.
- IRICO
- IDRO
- Mapna Locomotive Engineering and Manufacturing Company
- Polour Sabz
- Taam Locomotive Arya
- Arvin Tabriz Co.
- Fadak Group – Rail Pardaz System Company
- Isfahan Urban Railway Organization
- Mapna Wagon Pars (the largest Rolling Stocks manufacturer in the Middle East)

== Italy ==
- Alstom Ferroviaria
- Corifer
- Firema (now part of Titagarh Wagons)
- Hitachi Rail Italy

== Japan ==
- Alna Sharyo (former Alna Koki)
- Fuji Heavy Industries
- Hitachi
- Kawasaki Heavy Industries Rolling Stock Company
- Kinki Sharyo
- Mitsubishi Heavy Industries
- Niigata Transys Company
- Nippon Sharyo
- J-TREC
- Toshiba
- Niigata Engineering (also known as Niigata Tekko)

== North Korea ==
- 4 June Rolling Stock Works
- Chongjin Bus Repair Factory (tram rebuilds)
- Kim Chong-t'ae Electric Locomotive Works (1945–present)
- Pyongyang Bus Repair Factory (tram rebuilds)

== Malaysia ==
- Trendline Wagon
- SMH Rail Sdn Bhd

== Mexico ==
- Alstom, Mexico
- TYTAL (Trailers y Tanques de Aluminio SA de CV) Mexico
- Constructora Nacional de Carros de Ferrocarril SA (CNCF) Ciudad, Sahagún
- Construcciones y Auxiliar de Ferrocarriles (CAF)
- Locomotoras San Luis S.A. de C.V.
- Ferrovías del Bajío S.A. de C.V.

== Pakistan ==
- Pakistan Locomotive Factory
- Carriage Factory Islamabad
- Moghalpura Railway Workshops

== Philippines ==
- Manila Railroad Caloocan Works (1929–c. 1950)
- Metal Industry Research and Development Center
- Ramcar, Inc. — Still extant as the Ramcar Group of Companies, but rolling stock business ended before World War II.

== Poland ==
- Alstom, Poland
- Newag
- PESA
- Stadler Rail
- Solaris Bus & Coach (now a subsidiary of CAF)

== Romania ==
- Astra Rail Industries
- Astra Vagoane Călători
- Electroputere
- FAUR
- Electroputere VFU Paşcani
- Remarul 16 Februarie
- Softronic

== Russia ==
- United Wagon Company (Tikhvin Freight Car Building Plant)
- Altayvagon
- Muromteplovoz
- Uralvagonzavod
- Sinara transport machines (Sinara Group)
  - Ural Locomotives
  - Lyudinovsky Locomotive Plant
- Transmashholding
  - Bryansk Machine-Building Plant
  - Metrovagonmash
  - Kolomna Locomotive Works
  - Novocherkassk Electric Locomotive Plant
  - Demikhovo Machinebuilding Plant
  - Transmash
  - Tver Carriage Works
- JSC ZMK (Saratov region, Engels)
- UK RM RAIL
- Kambarka Engineering Works
- Tikhoretsk Machine Construction Plant n.a. Vorovsky
- First May Kirov Machine Plant
- Oktyabrsky Electric Car Repair Plant
- Circon Service

== Serbia ==
- Bratstvo
- Fabrika Vagona Kraljevo
- Goša FOM
- Mašinska Industrija Niš
- Siemens Kragujevac

== Slovakia ==
- Avokov
- Tatravagonka Poprad
- ZOS Vrutky

== Slovenia ==
- Sorbit valji
- Štore valji

== South Africa ==
- Alstom, South Africa
- Gibela Rail Transport Consortium RF (Pty) Ltd
- Transnet Engineering
- Galison Group
- Global Engineering Worx

== South Korea ==
- Dawonsys
- Hyundai Rotem
- RS KOREA
- Sung Shin RST
- Woojin Industrial Systems

== Spain ==
- Alstom, Spain
- CAF - Construcciones y Auxiliar de Ferrocarriles
- Stadler Rail
- Talgo

== Sweden ==
- Alstom, Sweden
- Kiruna Wagon
- Kockums Industrier

== Switzerland ==
- Alstom, Switzerland
- Stadler Rail

== Taiwan ==
- Alstom, Taiwan
- Taiwan Rolling Stock Company

== Turkey ==
- Alstom, Turkey
- Bozankaya
- CRRC-MNG Railway System Vehicles
- EUROTEM
- Turkish Railway Machines Industry Inc
- Turkish Wagon Industry Inc
- TÜVASAŞ
- Vako Wagon Inc

== United Kingdom ==
- Andrew Barclay Sons & Company
- Ashbury Railway Carriage & Iron Company
- Beyer, Peacock & Company
- Birmingham Railway Carriage & Wagon Company
- Black, Hawthorn & Co
- Bombardier Transportation (now Alstom)
- British Rail Engineering Limited
- British Thomson-Houston
- CAF Newport
- Dick, Kerr & Company
- Drewry Car Company
- Dübs & Company
- English Electric
- Glasgow Works
- Gloucester Railway Carriage & Wagon Company
- Hawthorn Leslie & Company
- Hitachi Newton Aycliffe
- Hudswell Clarke
- Hunslet Engine Company
- Kerr, Stuart & Company
- Leeds Forge Company
- Manning Wardle
- Metro-Cammell
- Metropolitan-Vickers
- Midland Railway Carriage & Wagon Company
- Nasmyth, Gaskell & Company
- North British Locomotive Company
- Pressed Steel Company
- R&W Hawthorn
- Robert Stephenson & Company
- Sentinel Waggon Works
- Swindon Works
- Vivarail
- Vulcan Foundry
- William Beardmore & Company
- Yorkshire Engine Company

== United States ==
- Adrian Car Company (1869–1883) Adrian, Michigan
- W.C. Allison & Sons (c. 1840 – c. 1895) Philadelphia, Pennsylvania
- Allegheny Car Company (c. 1873 – 1882) Swissvale, Pennsylvania
- Alstom
- Altoona Manufacturing Company (c. 1870 – c. 1900) Altoona, Pennsylvania
- Aluminum Company of America (Alcoa)
- American Bridge Company (United States Steel)
- American Car & Foundry (ACF) (to ARI)
- American Car Company (1852–1856) Chicago, Illinois
- AMF, Beard, Texas
- Anniston Car Company (1883–1887) Anniston, Alabama
- ARI (American Railcar Industries, formerly AC&F), to Greenbrier 2019
- Austin-Western (to Baldwin-Lima-Hamilton 1951)
- Baker, Jackson & Company (1880s) Latrobe, Pennsylvania
- Baldwin-Lima-Hamilton (until 1963)
- Baltimore Car and Foundry
- Barney and Smith Car Company (1849 – c. 1923) Dayton, Ohio
- Beaver Falls Car Company (1880s) Beaver Falls, Pennsylvania
- Bellefonte Car Manufacturing Company (c. 1873 – 1881) Bellefonte, Pennsylvania
- Berwick Forge and Fabricating – Berwick, Pennsylvania (to Whittaker)
- Bethlehem Steel Corporation (1901–2003) Johnstown, Pennsylvania
- Bettendorf Company (c. 1902 – 1942) Bettendorf, Iowa
- Billmeyer and Small (1852 – c. 1910) York, Pennsylvania
- Blain Brothers Car Works (1880s) Huntingdon, Pennsylvania
- Bloomsburg Car Manufacturing Company (c. 1868 – c. 1900) Bloomsburg, Pennsylvania
- Bombardier Transportation, US (now part of Alstom)
- Bowers, Dure & Company (1871–1886) Wilmington, Delaware
- Bridgeport Car Works (1870s) Bridgeport, Pennsylvania
- JG Brill Company (Brill)
- Brookville Equipment Corporation
- Budd Company (Budd) (1932–) Philadelphia, Pennsylvania
- Buffalo Car Manufacturing Company (1872–1890) Buffalo, New York
- Butler Manufacturing Company (1971–1973) Murfreesboro, Tennessee (built covered hoppers for NACC, later a NACC facility)
- Cambria Steel Company
- F.E. Canda & Company (until 1878) Chicago, Illinois
- Carlisle Manufacturing Company (c. 1870 – c. 1900) Carlisle, Pennsylvania
- Casebolt, Henry & Company (1863 – c. 1876) San Francisco, California
- Chattanooga Car & Foundry Company (1887–) Chattanooga, Tennessee
- Chicago Steel Car Company
- Chickasaw Ship Building & Car Company (1921–1928) Fairfield, Alabama
- Clark Car Company
- Cleveland Bridge & Car Works (1878–) Cleveland, Ohio
- W. Clough (1852–) Madison, Indiana
- Colorado Railcar
- Connellsville Machine and Car Company (1870s-1880s) Connellsville, Pennsylvania
- Conshohocken Car Works (1880–) Conshohocken, Pennsylvania
- Cummings Car Works (1851–1876) Jersey City, New Jersey
- Darby Corporation (1965–1989 ) Kansas City, Kansas
- Dauphin Car Works (1880s) Dauphin, Pennsylvania
- Davenport and Bridges (1834 – c. 1856) Cambridgeport, Massachusetts
- Davenport, Bridges & Company (1850s) Fitchburg, Massachusetts
- Dawson Manufacturing Company (c. 1870 – c. 1880) Dawson, Georgia
- Detroit Car and Manufacturing Company (1861–1870) Detroit, Michigan
- Detroit Car Works (1872–1879) Adrian (Detroit), Michigan
- DIFCO (originally Differential Steel Car Co.,) Findlay, Ohio (to Trinity)
- William Dyer
- East Railcar
- Eaton & Gilbert (1833–1893) Troy, New York
- Ebenezer Railcar, Buffalo, New York
- Edwards Rail Car Company (1921–1942)
- Edwards Rail Car Company (1997–2008)
- Elliott Car Company (c. 1885 – 1899) Gadsden, Alabama
- Elmira Car Manufactory (1862–1886) Elmira, New York
- Emmons Rail Car, York, Pennsylvania
- Empire Car Works (c. 1849 – c. 1890) York, Pennsylvania
- Ensign Manufacturing Company (c. 1873 – 1899) Huntington, West Virginia (to AC&F)
- Enterprise Railway Equipment Company
- Erie Car Works (1868 – c. 1920) Erie, Pennsylvania
- Evans Products (1964–1972) Plymouth, Michigan
- FMC (formerly Food Machinery Corp.) (1965-) South Charleston, West Virginia, (1965–1985) Portland, Oregon with acquisition of GBEC
- Franklin Foundry Machine & Car Works (c. 1840 – c. 1880) Franklin, Pennsylvania
- Frederick & Company (c. 1870 – c. 1900) Catasaqua, Pennsylvania
- FreightCar America (formerly Johnstown America Corporation, originally Bethlehem Steel Corp.)
- Freight Car Services
- Fruehauf Rail Division (formerly Magor Car Corp.) (1964–1973) Clifton, New Jersey
- Fruit Growers Express (1922–) Alexandria, Virginia
- Fulton Car Works/Keck & Hubbard (1847 – c. 1860) Cincinnati, Ohio
- Fulton Car Works/W.W. Wetherell (1839–1860s) Sandusky, Ohio
- Gantt Manufacturing Company (1973–) Greenville, South Carolina
- General American Transportation Corp. (GATX) (1898–) Sharon, Pennsylvania/East Chicago, Indiana/Warren, Ohio (carbuilding operations to Trinity Industries 1984)
- General Steel Industries (GSI; formerly General Steel Castings) (c. 1962–1972) Granite City, Illinois
- Georgia Railcar (until 1883) Carterville, Georgia (to Portec 1978; to Thrall 1984)
- Georgia Car & Manufacturing Company (c. 1900–) Savannah, Georgia
- Gilbert Car Company
- The Gregg Company (c. 1900–) Hanensack, NJ; mainly export, mining and sugar plantation equipment
- John L. Gill (1862–1883) Columbus, Ohio
- John L. Gill Jr. (until 1885) Allegheny, Pennsylvania
- Golden Tye (division of NRUC), Pickens, South Carolina
- James Goold & Company (1831 – c. 1890) Albany, New York
- The Greenbrier Companies (Greenbrier)
- Greenville Steel Car Company (GSC) (1916–) Greenville, Pennsylvania (to Trinity Industries 1986)
- Grice & Long (1860 – c. 1873) Trenton, New Jersey
- Grove Works (1848–1855) Hartford, Connecticut
- Gulf Railcar
- Gunderson Brothers Engineering Co. (GBEC)(1958–1973) Portland, Oregon (to FMC 1965)
- Gunderson (1985 with Greenbrier's acquisition of FMC)
- Hannibal Car Works (1870s) Hannibal, Missouri
- Harlan & Hollingsworth (1836 – c. 1945) Wilmington, Delaware
- Harrisburg Car Manufacturing Company (1853 – c. 1890) Harrisburg, Pennsylvania
- Harvey Steel Car and Repair Works (c. 1892) Harvey, Illinois
- Haskell and Barker Car Company (1852–1971) Michigan City, Indiana
- Hazelton Car Works (1880s) Hazelton, Pennsylvania
- Hicks Locomotive and Car Works (1897–1911) Chicago, Illinois
- Huntingdon Car Works (1872 – c. 1885) Huntingdon, Pennsylvania
- Illinois Car and Manufacturing Company (1897–1902) Chicago & Urbana, Illinois/Anniston, Alabama (to Western Steel Car 1902)
- Illinois Car & Manufacturing Company (c. 1909–) Hammond, Indiana
- Indiana Car Company (1872–1884) Cambridge City, Indiana
- Indianapolis Car Company (c. 1870 – c. 1900) Indianapolis, Indiana
- Indianapolis Car and Foundry
- Ingalls Shipbuilding, Pascagoula, Mississippi (built covered hoppers for NACC)
- International Car Company (ICC) (1952–) Buffalo, New York/Kenton, Ohio/East Chicago, Indiana (to PC&F 1975)
- Richard Imlay (1830 – c. 1840) Baltimore, Ohio/Philadelphia, Pennsylvania
- Itel
- Jackson and Sharp Company (Delaware Car Works) (1863 – c. 1945) Wilmington, Delaware
- Jackson and Woodin Manufacturing Company (1861–) Berwick, Pennsylvania
- J.J. Finnigan, Duluth, Georgia
- Jones Car Works (1879 – c. 1912) West Troy, New York
- Kansas City Car & Wheel Company (c. 1880 – c. 1900) Kansas City & Armourdale, Missouri
- Kasgro
- William M. Kasson & Son (c. 1860 – c. 1870) Buffalo, New York
- H.T. & I.N. Keith (later Keith Car) (c. 1865 – c. 1935) West Sandwich, Sagamore & Hyannis, Massachusetts
- Kimball & Gorton (1849–1862) Philadelphia, Pennsylvania
- Kimball Manufacturing Company (1860 – c. 1876) San Francisco, California
- Koppel Car Company, Chicago, Illinois (to Pressed Steel Car)
- Laconia Car Company (1879–1928) Laconia, New Hampshire
- LaFayette Car Works (1880–) LaFayette, Indiana
- Laporte Car Manufacturing Company (1872 – c. 1878) Laporte, Indiana
- Lebanon Manufacturing Company (1870–) Lebanon, Pennsylvania
- Lehigh Valley Car Manufacturing Company (c. 1870–) Stemton, Pennsylvania
- Lenoir Car Company (1894–1930) Lenoir City, Tennessee
- Liberty Car and Equipment
- Liberty Railway Services (2016–) Pueblo, CO (affiliated with Ebenezer Railcar)
- Lima Car Company (1880s) Lima, Ohio
- Litchfield Car Manufacturing Company (1872–) Litchfield, Illinois
- Locks & Canals (c. 1840 – c. 1850) Lowell, Massachusetts
- Madison Car Company (1891–) Madison, Illinois
- Magor Car Corporation (1902–1973) Passaic, New Jersey (to Fruehauf)
- Mansfield Machine Works (c. 1870–) Mansfield, Ohio
- Marathon Tank Car, Houston, Texas (to Richmond Tank Car)
- Marshall Car and Foundry Company (1880–) Marshall, Texas
- Mather Stock Car Company
- Maxson Corporation (formerly St. Paul Foundry & Manufacturing) (1966–) St. Paul, Minnesota
- McGuire, Cummings Manufacturing Company (c. 1890 – c. 1930) Chicago, Illinois
- McKee, Fuller & Company (1879–) Catasauqua, Pennsylvania
- McNary, Claflin & Company (1864–1878) Cleveland, Ohio
- Mechtron Industries (1974–1981) Wilmington, Delaware (built covered hoppers for NACC)
- Memphis Car & Foundry (1894–) Memphis, Tennessee
- Merchants Despatch Transportation Company
- Michigan Car Company (1864–1970) Detroit, Michigan (to AC&F)
- Michigan-Peninsular Car Company (to AC&F)
- Middletown Car Company (1869 – c. 1930) Middletown, Pennsylvania
- Midwest Freight Car (1973–) Clinton, Illinois (to Portec 1977)
- Millenium Rail
- Milwaukee Car Manufacturing Company (until 1910) Milwaukee, Wisconsin
- Minerva Car Works (c. 1880 – c. 1920) Minerva, Ohio
- Minnesota Car Company (1888–1896) Duluth, Minnesota
- Missouri Car and Foundry Company (1870–) St. Louis, Missouri (to AC&F)
- Morrison International, A.A. Morrison (to ICC)
- Morrison-Knudsen
- Mount Vernon Car Manufacturing Company (1888–1954) Mt. Vernon, Illinois (to Pressed Steel Car 1946)
- Mowry Car and Wheel Works (1851–1880) Cincinnati, Ohio
- Murray, Dougall and Company (1864–) Milton, Pennsylvania
- Muskegon Car and Engine Works (c. 1880 – 1886) Muskegon, Michigan
- National Alabama Corporation (NAC)
- National Railway Utilization Company (1976–) Pickens, South Carolina
- New Haven Car Company (c. 1860 – c. 1879) New Haven, Connecticut
- Newport News Shipbuilding Company
- Niagara Car Wheel Company
- Nobel Brothers & Company (1880s) Rome, Georgia
- Norca Machinery
- North American Car Corporation (1955–), Chicago, Illinois (carbuilding operations to Trinity Industries 1986)
- North Carolina Car Company (1882–) Raleigh, North Carolina
- North-Western Manufacturing Car Company (c. 1880–) Stillwater, Minnesota
- Norwich Car Company (1847 – c. 1852) Norwich, Connecticut
- Ohio Falls Car Manufacturing Company (1864 – c. 1945) Jeffersonville, Indiana (to AC&F)
- Ortner Freight Car Company (1953–) Covington, Kentucky (to Trinity Industries 1987)
- Osgood Bradley Car Company (c. 1833 – 1960) Worcester, Massachusetts
- Ostermann Manufacturing Company (1906–1911) West Pullman, Illinois
- Oxford Co-operative Car Company (1873 – c. 1878) Oxford, Pennsylvania
- Pacific Car and Foundry (PACCAR) (1905–) Renton, Washington/Portland, Oregon
- Paragon Bridge & Steel, Novi, Michigan (to Portec 1968)
- Pardee Car and Machine Works (c. 1875 – c. 1890) Watsontown, Pennsylvania
- Pardee, Snyder & Company (1880s) Williamsport, Pennsylvania
- Patten Car Works (1872 – c. 1890) Bath, Maine
- Patton Motor Company, Chicago
- Peninsular Car Company (1879–) Adrian & Detroit, Michigan
- Pennock Brothers (c. 1875 – c. 1915) Minerva, Ohio
- Pennsylvania Car Company (1880s) Latrobe & Ligonier, Pennsylvania
- Perley A. Thomas Car Works
- Petersburg Car Company (1873–) Petersburg, Virginia
- Pittsburgh Car Works (c. 1865 – 1883) Pittsburgh, Pennsylvania
- Pittsburgh & McKeesport Car Company (c. 1855 – 1877) McKeesport, Pennsylvania
- Portec, Inc. (1968–1984)(to Thrall 1984; autorack designs to Greenville 1986)
- Portland Company (1848–1912) Portland, Maine
- Progress Rail Albertville, Alabama
- Pressed Steel Car Company (1899–1954) Pittsburgh, Pennsylvania
- Pullman Company (Pullman)
- Pullman-Standard (PS) (to Trinity Industries 1984)
- Quick Car, Fort Worth, Texas (to Trinity Industries 1984)
- Ralston Steel Car Company (1905–1953) Columbus, Ohio
- Ranlet Car Company (c. 1845 – 1879) Laconia, New Hampshire
- Richmond Tank Car Company (1962–) Sheldon, Texas
- Richmond Car Works Richmond, Virginia
- Rohr, Inc.
- Russell & Company (c. 1854 – c. 1880) Massillon & Canton, Ohio
- Ryan Car Company (1906 – c. 1940) Hegewisch, Illinois
- St. Charles Car Company (until 1899) St. Charles, Missouri
- St. Lawrence Shops (division of NRUC), Norfolk, New York
- St. Louis Car Company (SLCC) (1887–1973) St. Louis, Missouri (to GSI 1960)
- St. Louis Car Works (1857–1862) St. Louis, Missouri
- St. Paul Foundry & Manufacturing, St. Paul, Minnesota (to Maxson Corp. c. 1968)
- Michael Schall (1870s-c. 1890) Middletown, Pennsylvania
- Schneider's Combination Cars, Chicago
- G.W. Snyder (c. 1850 – 1880s) Pottsville, Pennsylvania
- South Atlantic Car & Manufacturing Company (1903–) Waycross, Georgia
- South Baltimore Car Works (c. 1885 – c. 1930) Baltimore, Maryland
- Southeastern Specialties, Jacksonville, Florida
- Southern Car and Foundry (1899–1904) Lenoir City & Memphis, Tennessee & Gadsden, Alabama
- Southern Car and Wagon Manufactory (1850s) Memphis, Tennessee
- Southern Car Works (1881–) Knoxville, Tennessee
- Southern Iron & Equipment (1966–) Decatur, Georgia & Ashland City, Tennessee (to Evans)
- Southwark=Baldwin
- Springfield Car & Engine Company (1848 – c. 1857) Springfield, Massachusetts
- Standard Steel Car Company (1902–1930) (to Pullman-Standard)
- George H. Stem & Company (c. 1870 – c. 1885) Stemton, Pennsylvania
- John Stephenson & Company (1832–1842) New York, New York
- Street's Western Stable Car Line (c. 1885–) Chicago, Illinois
- Structural Steel Car Company (1902 – c. 1940) Canton, Ohio
- Swissvale Car Company (1873 – c. 1885) Swissvale, Pennsylvania
- Taunton Car Company (1869–1873) Taunton, Massachusetts
- Tennessee Coal, Iron and Railroad
- Terre Haute Car and Manufacturing Company (c. 1863 – c. 1930) Terre Haute, Indiana
- Thrall Car Manufacturing Company (Thrall) (1917–) Chicago Heights, Illinois (to Trinity Industries 2001)
- Tiffin Car Works (1872–) Tiffin, Ohio
- Timms Car Company (until 1882) Columbus, Ohio
- Tracy & Fales/Grove Works (1852 – c. 1857) Hartford, Connecticut
- Transco (1965–1966) Macon, Georgia
- Trenton Locomotive & Machine Manufacturing Company (1854–1863) Trenton, New Jersey
- Tredegar Company (c. 1850 – c. 1900) Richmond, Virginia
- James A. Trimble, New York City
- Trinity Industries (1978–present), Trinity Rail Group (2001–2004), TrinityRail (2004–present)
- Union Car and Bridge Works (1852–1856) Chicago, Illinois
- Union Car Works (1847–1857) York, Pennsylvania
- Union Car Works (1867–) St. Louis, Missouri
- Union Car Works (1893–1926) Depew, New York
- Union Tank Car Company (1947–) Whiting, Indiana
- United American Car, Cartersville, Georgia (to Thrall)
- United States Rolling Stock Company (1875–1893) Chicago Illinois
- United States Railway Equipment (USRE) (1954–) Blue Island, Illinois (to Evans)
- United Streetcar
- US Car and Foundry
- US Railcar (2009–2025)
- Vertex Railcar
- Virginia Bridge & Iron Company (until 1920s) Roanoke, Virginia
- Wagner Palace Car Company (1887–1900) Buffalo & New York, New York
- Warren Tank Car Company (c. 1900–) Warren, Pennsylvania
- Charles Wason & Company (1852–1855) Cleveland, Ohio
- Wason Car and Foundry Company (1873–1885) Chattanooga, Tennessee
- Wason Manufacturing Company (1846–1932) Springfield, Massachusetts
- Watsontown Car Company (1870s) Watsontown, Pennsylvania
- Wayne Car & Engine Works (c. 1850 – 1857) Fort Wayne, Indiana
- Wells and French Company (c. 1860 – c. 1945) Chicago, Illinois
- Uriah Wells (1850s) Petersburg, Virginia
- West Pullman Car Works (until 1911) Pullman, Illinois
- Western Wheeled Scraper (1904–) (to Austin-Western)
- Western Steel Car and Foundry (1902 – c. 1940) Hegewisch, Illinois (to Pressed Steel Car)
- Witt, Harbeck & Company (1850–) Cleveland, Ohio
- Wharton & Petsch (1850–) Charleston, South Carolina
- Whittaker Industries (formerly Berwick Forge & Fabricating)
- Whitehead & Kales (1965–1967) River Rouge, Michigan (to Thrall 1984)
- Youngstown Car & Manufacturing Company (1881–1914) Youngstown, Ohio
- Youngstown Steel Car Company (1914–) Youngstown, Ohio

== Defunct ==
=== Australia ===
- Commonwealth Engineering

=== Austria ===
- Simmering-Graz-Pauker (SGP) (acquired by Siemens)

=== Belgium ===
- La Brugeoise et Nivelles (bought by Bombardier, in turn bought by Alstom)

=== Canada ===
- AMF Technotransport, Montreal, Quebec
- Bombardier Transportation
- Canadian Car and Foundry (CANCAR) (now part of Alstom)
- Eastern Car Company, Trenton, Nova Scotia (to Hawker Siddeley Canada)
- Marine Industries, Sorel, Quebec
- Montreal Locomotive Works – Toronto Transit Commission subway cars
- National Steel Car (NSC), Hamilton, Ontario
- Preston Car Company
- Hawker Siddeley Canada, Trenton, Nova Scotia and Thunder Bay, Ontario (to Trenton Works)
- Ottawa Car Company – interurban cars
- Trenton Works, Trenton, Nova Scotia (to Greenbrier 1995)
- Urban Transportation Development Corporation, Thunder Bay, Ontario

=== France ===
- Baume et Marpent

=== Germany ===
- Adtranz (bought by Bombardier, in turn bought by Alstom)
- Daimler-Benz (folded into Adtranz)
- Allgemeine Elektricitäts-Gesellschaft AG (AEG) (merged into Adtranz)
- LEW Hennigsdorf (AEG to East German state owned back to AEG)

=== Hungary ===
- Ganz Works
- MÁVAG

=== Latvia ===
- Rīgas Vagonbūves Rūpnīca

=== Mexico ===
- Concarril (CNCF) (1950s–1992, then acquired by Bombardier and later Alstom)

=== Sweden ===
- ASEA
- Kalmar Verkstad (KVAB) (acquired by Bombardier, later part of Alstom)

== See also ==
- List of locomotive manufacturers
- List of tram builders
- List of railway companies
