= EIKON International =

EIKON International is located in Montgomery, Alabama, and makes interurban cars, trolley cars and streetcars. EIKON also restores and manufactures other types of rail cars, including streetcars. EIKON emerged in 2008 as Edwards Rail Car Company ceased production of railcars at the Montgomery location.

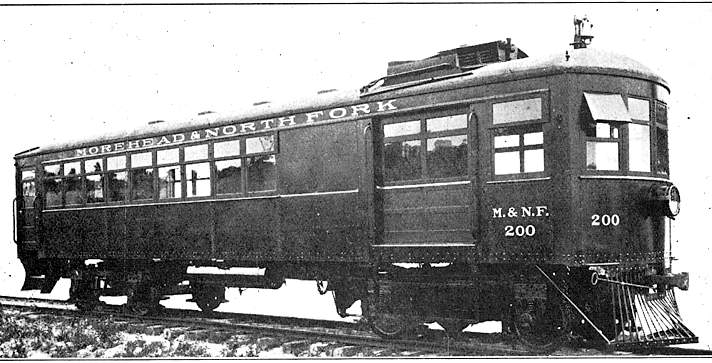
Edwards Model 20

== Current operations ==
In production are several railbuses to be sent to Peru for operation, patterned after original Edwards designs dating from the mid-1920s. The propulsion system for these cars uses a diesel-hydraulic design after joint engineering with Parker Hannifin and Cummins.

Peter Witt trolley #754 was restored for M-Line Trolley, as well as an original Edwards Model 10 for a private collector.

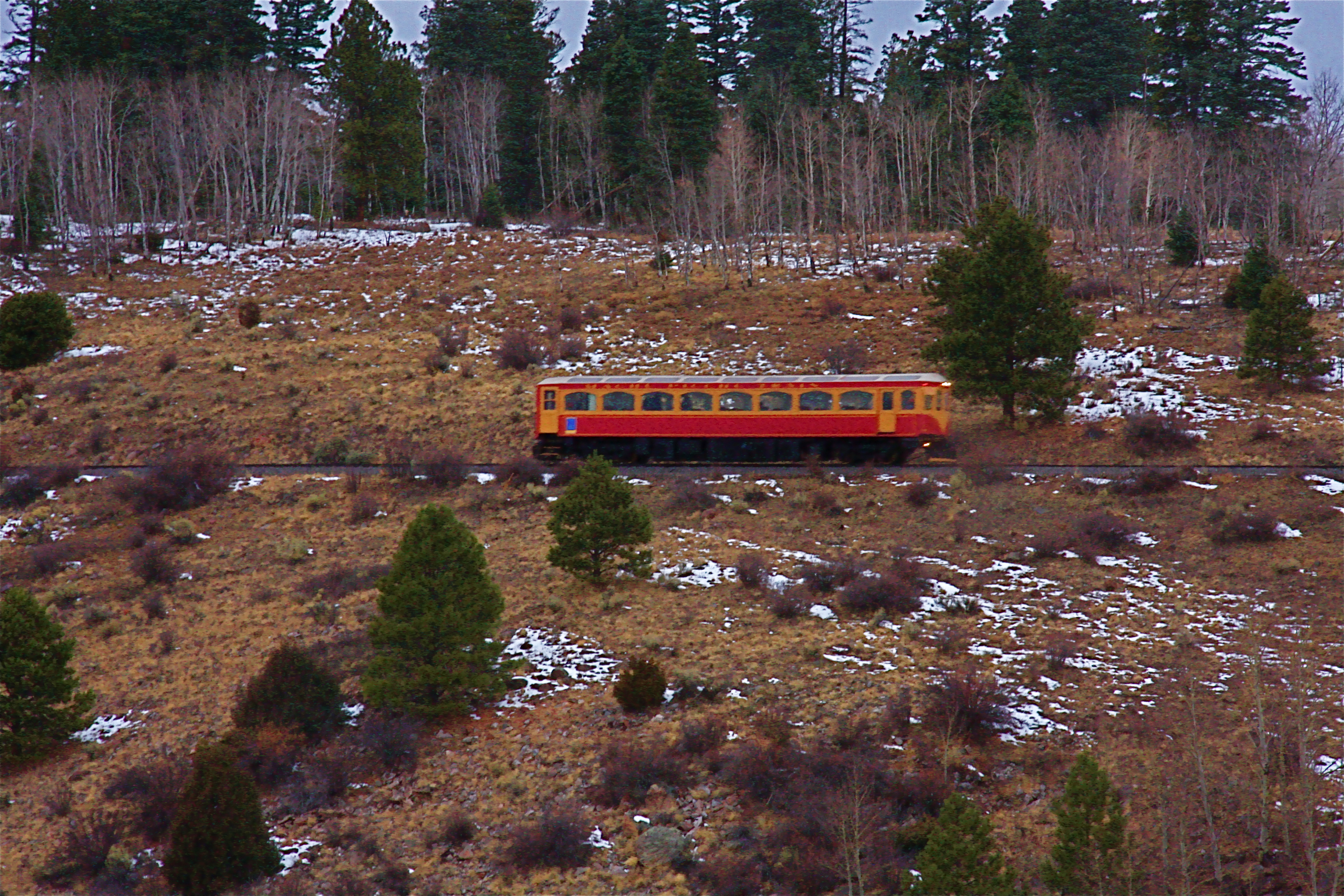
EIKON Model 20

== See also ==
- Doodlebug
- Streetcar
