= Michigan Car Company =

Rolling stock manufacturer

- Company type: Rail transport, rolling stock
- Founded: 1864
- Founders: John S. Newberry; James McMillan
- Defunct: 1892
- Headquarters: Detroit, Michigan, United States

The Michigan Car Company was a railroad rolling stock manufacturer located in Detroit, Michigan.

The Michigan Car Company was organized in 1864 by John S. Newberry (b. 1826) and James McMillan (b. 1838) in order to manufacture railroad cars for the Union Army. In 1873 it relocated its main factory to Grand Trunk Junction. Newberry and McMillan also started supplier companies including an iron works and the Detroit Wheel Company.

Along with Charles L. Freer and Frank J. Hecker's competing Peninsular Car Company, Michigan Car was the largest manufacturer in "Gilded Age" Detroit. By the 1890s, the Detroit railroad car manufacturers earned some $14.7 million in revenue from the manufacture of cars, car wheels, roofs, and repair work, while employing around 6,000 workers. Average production rates were around 76 cars per day.

In 1892, Michigan Car and Peninsular Car merged to form the Michigan-Peninsular Car Company, which was the largest manufacturer of railroad cars in the United States. In 1899, it merged with a dozen other smaller firms to form American Car and Foundry.

Henry Ford was employed at the Michigan Car company beginning in 1879. Charles Brady King was a representative from 1889 to 1892.

== See also ==
- List of rolling stock manufacturers
