= Diego Bustos =

Diego Bustos may refer to:

- Diego Bustos (anchorman) (born 1971), Argentine anchorman and media personality
- Diego Bustos (footballer) (born 1974), Argentine footballer
