= Michigan-Peninsular Car Company =

Rolling stock manufacturer

- Company type: public
- Industry: rail transport
- Founded: 1892
- Headquarters: Detroit, MI, United States
- Products: freight cars

The Michigan-Peninsular Car Company was a railroad rolling stock manufacturing company formed from the merger of five manufacturing companies in 1892. It was Detroit's largest manufacturer before the rise of the automotive industry.

In 1899, it merged with a dozen other railroad car manufacturing firms to form American Car and Foundry Company (ACF).

== History ==
Michigan-Peninsular Car Company was formed from the merger of Michigan Car Company, Peninsular Car Company, Detroit Car Wheel Company, Michigan Forge and Iron Company and Detroit Pipe and Foundry Company, with Russell A. Alger appointed as the first president of the consolidated company. The combined company could build over 100 new freight cars per day. It was financed and controlled by a syndicate led by James A. McMillan.

The Panic of 1893 directly affected Michigan-Peninsular as orders for new cars evaporated, the plant was completely closed for five months. The next three years and the further financial difficulties of 1897 also negatively affected Michigan-Peninsular such that the company was considering reducing the amount of capital stock available. One report in the New York Times claims that Michigan-Peninsular had issued $3,000,000 in common stock and $5,000,000 in preferred stock and that during this time Col. Frank J. Hecker and Charles L. Freer gained a controlling interest in the company.

In 1899, Michigan-Peninsular was one of 13 companies merged to form ACF, with Michigan-Peninsular's plant becoming ACF's Detroit Plant. In 1902, the Detroit Plant became the first of ACF's facilities to move a car under construction on its own trucks between stationary workstations.

== See also ==
- List of rolling stock manufacturers
