= Kiruna Wagon =

Ore wagon manufacturer

Kiruna Wagon AB
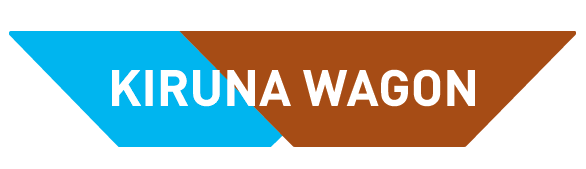
- Industry: Rail-based ore transport
- Founded: 2004
- Headquarters: Kiruna, Sweden
- Products: Ore wagons
- Website: www.kirunawagon.com

Kiruna Wagon AB is a Swedish company specialised in the custom design and manufacture of ore wagons. Kiruna Wagon was established in 2004 and is owned by mechanical engineering companies Nybergs Mekaniska Verkstad and Rönnqvist & Wettainen. The company headquarters and workshop are in Kiruna, Sweden's northernmost city and the country's mining capital.

== Products ==
=== Bottom Dumper FAMMOORR^{050} ===
Kiruna Wagon's largest order to date is the manufacture of Bottom Dumper FAMMOORR^{050} for Swedish mining company LKAB which commenced in 2005. The new-generation ore wagon is built for a 30-tonne axle load and carries up to 100 tonnes, which is 25 per cent more than the previous generation wagons. When in operation, the ore wagons travel in pairs – two short-coupled Fanoo^{040} making up one Fammoorr^{050}. The Bottom Dumpers for LKAB are manufactured in collaboration with K Industrier in Malmö, which builds the chassis while Kiruna Wagon is responsible for the manufacture of the body and hatch system and for final assembly. In September 2012, Kiruna Wagon delivered the 1000th wagon to LKAB.

=== Bottom Dumper NO-RG Fanoo ===
In May 2013, Kiruna Wagon received an order to manufacture 40 ore wagons for Norwegian mining company no:Rana Gruber AS. The NO-RG Fanoo Bottom Dumper, which is built for a 30-tonne axle load empties its load through a large bottom door. The wagon is a further development of the Bottom Dumper built for LKAB and designed to deliver low tare weight and high payload advantage and enable a more environmentally friendly transportation. The NO-RG Fanoo Bottom Dumper is used by Rana Gruber to transport primary sized crude ore, 0–300 mm in size and with a high quartz content, from the Kvannevann underground iron ore mine and satellite open pit deposits in the Ørtfjell area to the dressing plant and port in Mo i Rana.

=== Side Dumper TAIMN^{091} ===
Since 2009, Kiruna Wagon has manufactured Side Dumpers for the Swedish mining and smelting company Boliden AB. The Side Dumper TAIMN^{091} for Boliden is a closed container wagon designed for the transport of ore concentrate in an environmentally sustainable way. The 4-axle bogie wagon measures a little over twelve metres and has a capacity of carrying 73 metric tonnes, or 40.5 m^{3}. The wagon is equipped with a roof for environmental reasons and is constructed for both left and right-side tipping. The subarctic climate influences the choice of materials and the wagon is made mainly of advanced high-strength steels.

=== Helix Dumper ===
Kiruna Wagon's Helix Dumper is optimised for small fractions and tough-flowing commodities that are unsuitable for bottom discharge. The system consists of robust and low maintenance wagons and a low cost unloading station that uses a body-turning device to unload the wagons while the chassis remains on the rails. The Helix Dumper can unload at a speed of 25,000 tonnes per hour. In April 2012, Kiruna Wagon entered into agreement with international mining company Northland Resources S.A. to produce 150 Helix Dumpers for the transport of ore concentrate from Northland's transhipment terminal in Pitkäjärvi in Sweden to the port of Narvik in Norway. In 2016, Kiruna Wagon reached agreement on the principal terms of an exclusive licensing arrangement with Australian RCR Tomlinson, which will manufacture and distribute the Helix Dumper system throughout Australia, New Zealand and Southeast Asia.

=== Underground wagons for LKAB ===
In December 2010, Kiruna Wagon was contracted to manufacture 121 underground wagons for the transport of crude ore at LKAB's new main level, 1,365 metres below ground. The drawings were provided by the customer, LKAB. The wagons are loaded through the ore-pass chute and emptied through bottom discharge, whereby the entire bottom of the wagon is opened in a discharge curve. The wagons have an unloading capacity of approx. 10,000 tonnes per hour.

=== Bottom Dumper Uadk ===
In 2003, K Industrier in Malmö, with Kiruna Wagon as subcontractor, was awarded the contract to produce 110 ore wagons of the Uadk type for LKAB. The Uadk wagon is a modification of LKAB's earlier Uad wagon, built for a 25-tonne axle load and with a capacity of transporting 80 tonnes.

=== Other products & services ===
Besides building wagons, Kiruna Wagon provides equipment for loading and unloading ore, under and above ground as well as wagon maintenance.

== Qualifications & methods of manufacturing ==
In the company's Kiruna workshop, Kiruna Wagon carries out manual fusion welding controlled by more than 80 welding standards, among them quality requirements according to SS-EN ISO 3834, specifications and qualifications of welding procedures according to SS-EN ISO 15614-1 and welder approval SS-EN ISO 9606. The company's main welding robot has a working area of 4×4×20 metres.
