= SABB S.A. =

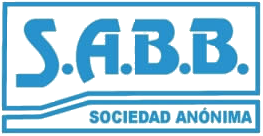
- Formerly: S.A. Bautista Buriasco e Hijos
- Company type: S.A.
- Industry: Transport
- Founded: January 1, 1951; 75 years ago
- Founder: Bautista Buriasco
- Headquarters: María Juana, Santa Fe Province, Argentina
- Products: Goods wagons
- Number of employees: 80 (2012)

SABB S.A. (an acronym for S.A. Bautista Buriasco e Hijos Ltda.) is an Argentine rolling stock manufacturer and shipyard based in María Juana, Santa Fe Province. The company was founded in 1951 and has supplied over 10,000 vehicles to the Argentine railways over the years.

The company was the first Argentine rolling stock company set up after the nationalisation of the railways in 1948 and was the first company to produce cargo cars in the country after Ferrocarriles Argentinos ordered 2,000 cars in 1951. The company currently has a 32,000 square metres (7.9 acres) factory in María Juana where it is based.

== History ==
In the 1930s, Bautista Buriasco bought shares in La Margariteña, a combine harvester manufacturer of Colonia Margarita, Santa Fe Province. In 1938 he moved the factory to the city of María Juana, where it continued producing agricultural machinery. After the World War II the company used military trucks to adapt them to transport cattle and grains.

In 1944 Buriasco established a new company, "La Soberana", that started to produce cannons, pontoons for the Argentine Army, fuel tanks for YPF and water tank for Obras Sanitarias, the main water supply company of Argentina by then. When the whole Argentine railway network was nationalised in 1948, the rolling stock was seriously damaged due to the lack of maintenance. In view of that situation, Buriasco secretly built a goods wagon to offer it to the National Government.

Once the wagon prototype received approval from the Ministry of Transport, the Buriasco Family signed a contract to build 2,000 units of covered, livestock and open wagons.

On January 1, 1951, "Bautista Buriasco e Hijos" was established. Under that name the company started the construction of a new factory to build and distribute the wagons. A railway line to the factory entrance was built for that purpose.

During the 1970s the company had around 1,000 employees, but this number declined after the privatisation of the railways and fell to just 80 by 2012. However, following the re-nationalisation of the railways in 2012–2015, business has picked up again with contracts coming from the state fright operator Belgrano Cargas.

SABB has exported vehicles to neighbouring countries such as Brazil and Bolivia, as well as selling to domestic freight companies such as Ferroexpreso Pampeano, Ferrosur Roca and Nuevo Central Argentino.

In 2014, the Government of Argentina commissioned SABB to repair and refurbish 59 freight wagons, that were added to the Belgrano Cargas y Logística division.

After the Buriasco family left the business, SABB S.A. continued operating.
