= VRZ Karlovo =

Rolling stock manufacturer

VRZ Karlovo, PLC
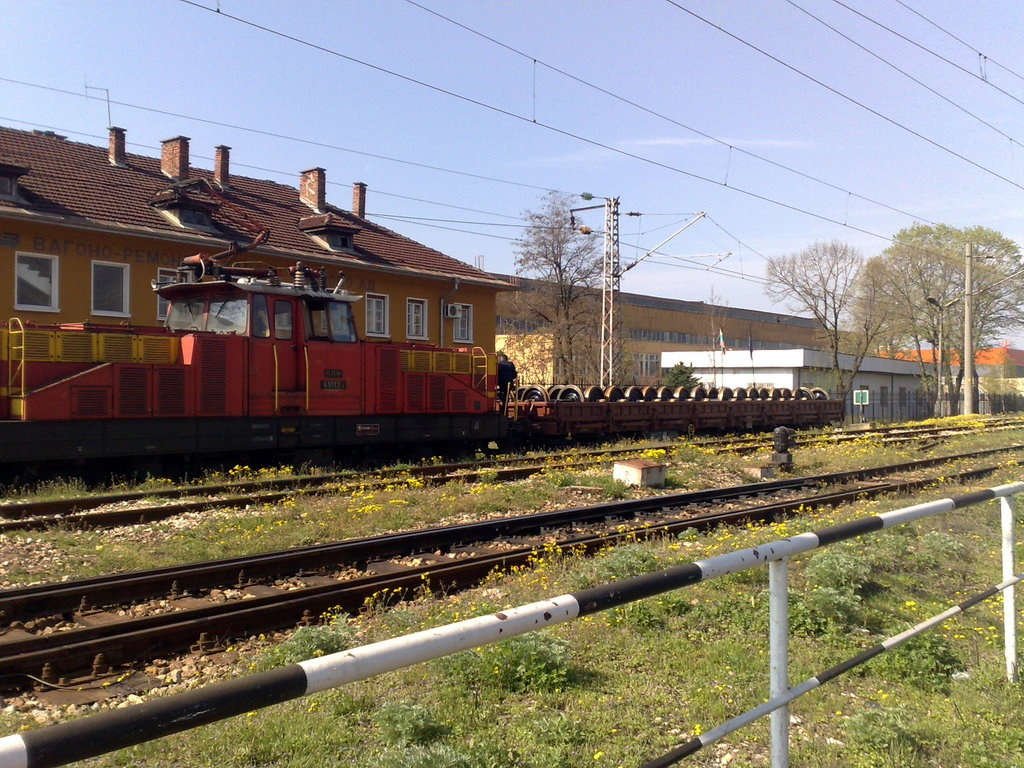
- Company type: private
- Industry: railroad car
- Predecessor: Before 1964: Karlovo-Krupp; Karlovo-MAN; Karlovo-Ansaldo
- Founded: 1923
- Headquarters: Karlovo, Bulgaria
- Products: railway cars/wagons railway equipment rolling stock assemblies spare parts production railroad car - Sgnss'60, Zas/Zaes/Zacns, Eaos/Eanos
- Number of employees: 280

VRZ Karlovo or Vagono-remonten zavod Karlovo (Bulgarian: Вагоно-ремонтен завод Карлово - 'Wagon Repair Plant Karlovo'), mostly known as (Bulgarian: ВРЗ Карлово АД), was established in 1923 in Karlovo with principal business activities in repairs of railway cars and production of spare parts.

In 2005, VRZ Karlovo was contracted by Bulgarian State Railways for the refurbishment of 3260 wagons. Since 2007 the focus of the company was shifted on design, development and manufacturing of a railway car for the Bulgarian and European markets – cars type Sgnss (container wagon), Zas/Zaes/Zacns (tank wagons for light and heavy petroleum products, acids), Eaos/Eanos (open wagons for bulk goods), etc. In present days, the company's activity includes railway cars repairing and manufacturing services, railway equipment, spare parts production, assemblies and units for the rolling stock. In 2019, the company was bought by Deutsche Bahn.

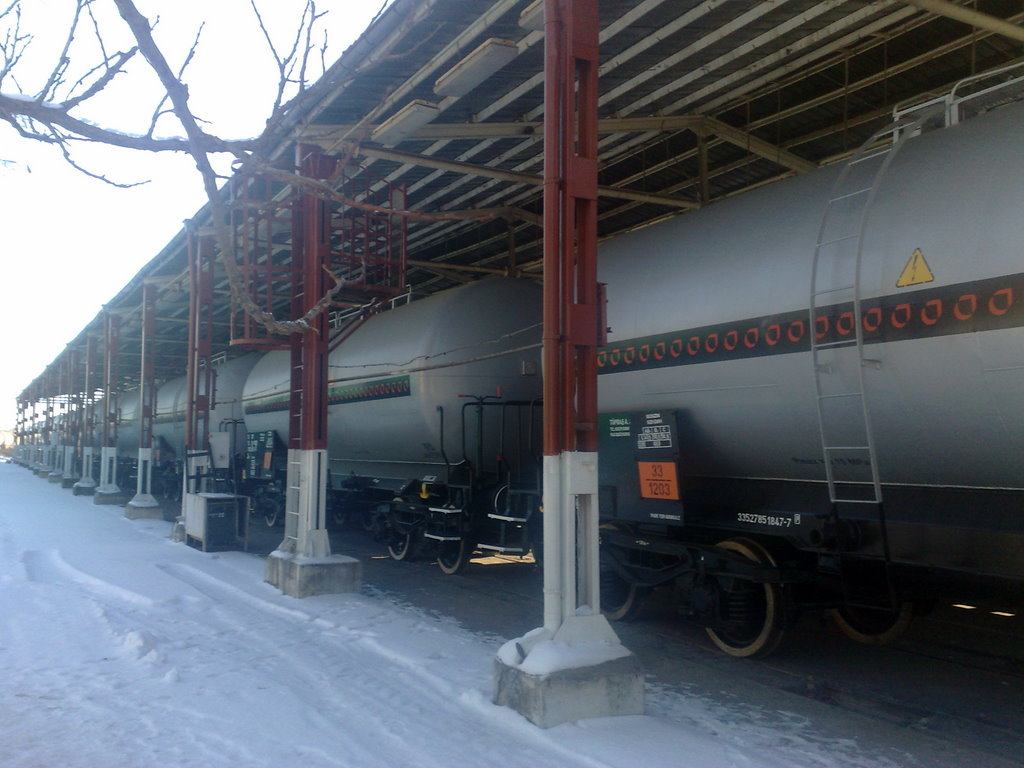
ZAS Wagon

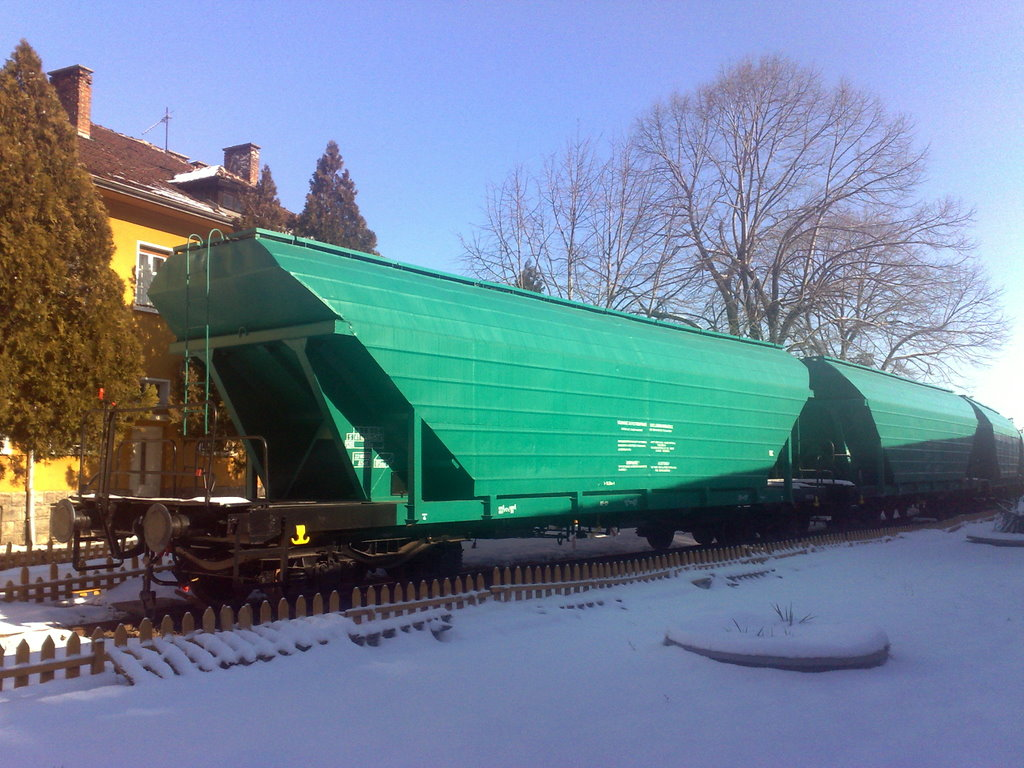
ORE Wagon

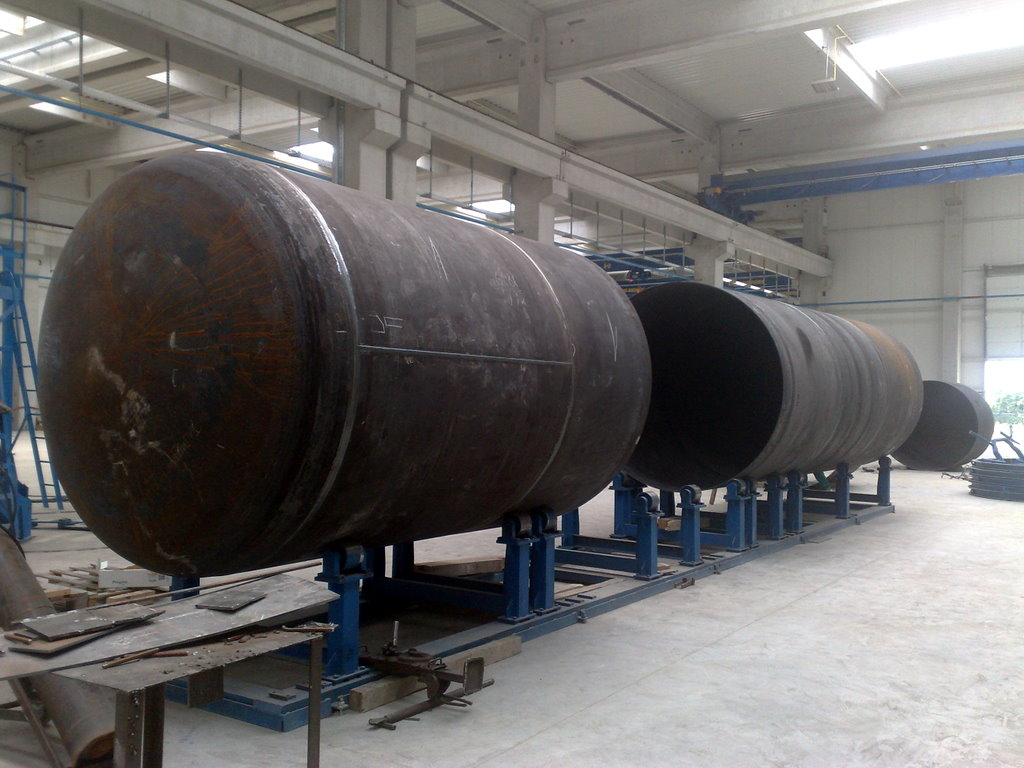
Tank 37m3

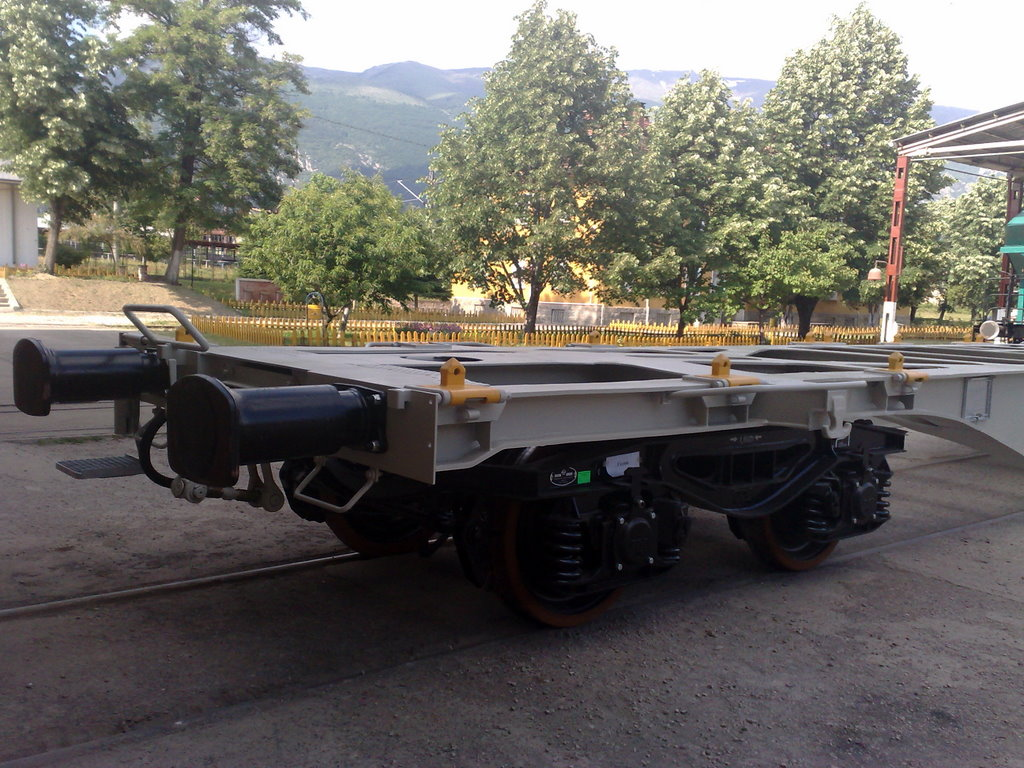
Sgnss Wagon

== See also ==
- Railroad car
- List of rolling stock manufacturers
