= St. Charles Car Company =

American rolling stock manufacturer

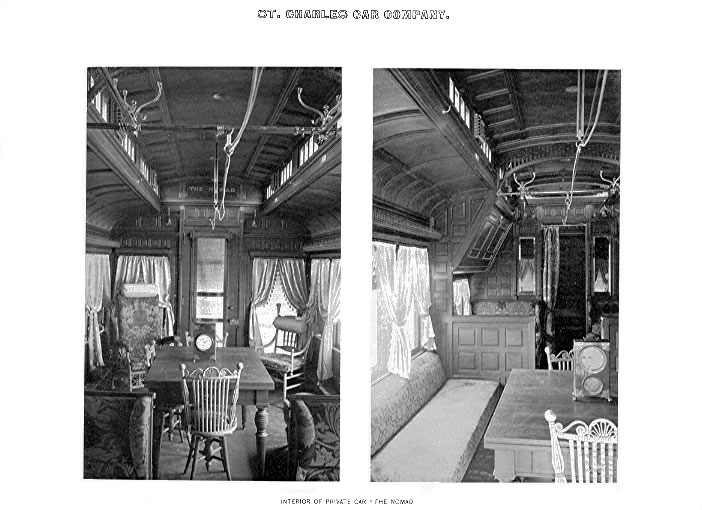
- Interior view of The Nomad, the Director's Car for the Denver and Rio Grande Western Railroad
- Founded: 1872 or 1873
- Defunct: 1899
- Fate: Merged with 12 other companies
- Successor: American Car and Foundry
- Headquarters: St. Charles, Missouri, United States

St. Charles Car Company, a railroad rolling stock manufacturing company located in St. Charles, Missouri, was founded in 1872 or 1873. In 1899 it merged with twelve other companies to form American Car and Foundry (ACF). The St. Charles plant became the main passenger car works. With a failing market for steel passenger cars, ACF phased out the St. Charles operation in 1959.

Its extant buildings are located in the Frenchtown Historic District.

== See also ==
- List of rolling stock manufacturers
