= Charles Lang Freer =

American industrialist and businessman (1854–1919)

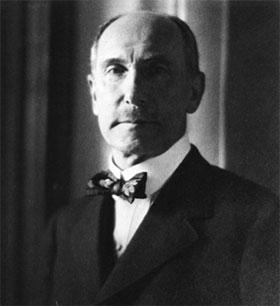
- 1916 photograph portrait by Edward Steichen
- Born: February 25, 1854; Kingston, New York, United States
- Died: September 25, 1919 (aged 65); New York City, New York, United States
- Resting place: Wiltwyck Cemetery; 41°55′24.4″N 74°00′21.2″W
- Occupation: Businessman
- Known for: Collector of Asian and American art

Charles Lang Freer (February 25, 1854 – September 25, 1919) was an American industrialist, art collector, and patron. He is known for his large collection of East Asian, American, and Middle Eastern art. In 1906, Freer donated his extensive collection to the Smithsonian Institution, making him the first American to bequeath his private collection to the United States. To house the objects, including The Peacock Room by James McNeill Whistler, Freer funded the construction of the Freer Gallery of Art in Washington, D.C.

== Biography ==
=== Early life ===
Charles Lang Freer was born in Kingston, New York, United States, in 1856. He was the son of Jacob Roosa Freer (1819–1875) and Phoebe Jane Townsend Freer (1826–1868). He was a direct descendant of Hugo Freer, a New Paltz patentee and the first Freer to the United States. The third child of six, his family had little money. Freer's mother died when he was fourteen years of age. After the seventh grade, Freer left school and took a job in a cement factory. In the early 1870s, Freer was noticed by Frank J. Hecker, then general superintendent of the New York, Kingston, & Syracuse Railroad, while working as a clerk in a general store. Hecker capitalized on Freer's accounting and organizational skills, hiring the young man as his paymaster and accountant in 1874. In the 1870s, a group of investors from Detroit decided to build a rail line in Logansport, Indiana; they hired Hecker to manage the project. Hecker brought the younger Freer along. Hecker's daughter, Anna Cynthia Hecker (1871–1923), would marry Freer's younger brother, Watson Marthis Freer (1863–1922).

=== Industry, railroads, and retirement ===
In 1879, using connections made in the railroad business and the financial backing of a group of Christian H. Buhl, James Joy, Russell Alger, James McMillan, and Allan Shelden, Freer and Hecker moved to Detroit, where they created the Peninsular Car Company in 1885. The business made both men wealthy and Peninsular became Detroit's second largest car manufacturer. In 1892, Peninsular merged with the Michigan Car Company, taking over the majority of the railcar market in Detroit. At the time, Michigan-Peninsular Car was Michigan's largest manufacturer. Seven years later, in 1899, Freer organized a 13-company merger, creating American Car and Foundry in 1899.

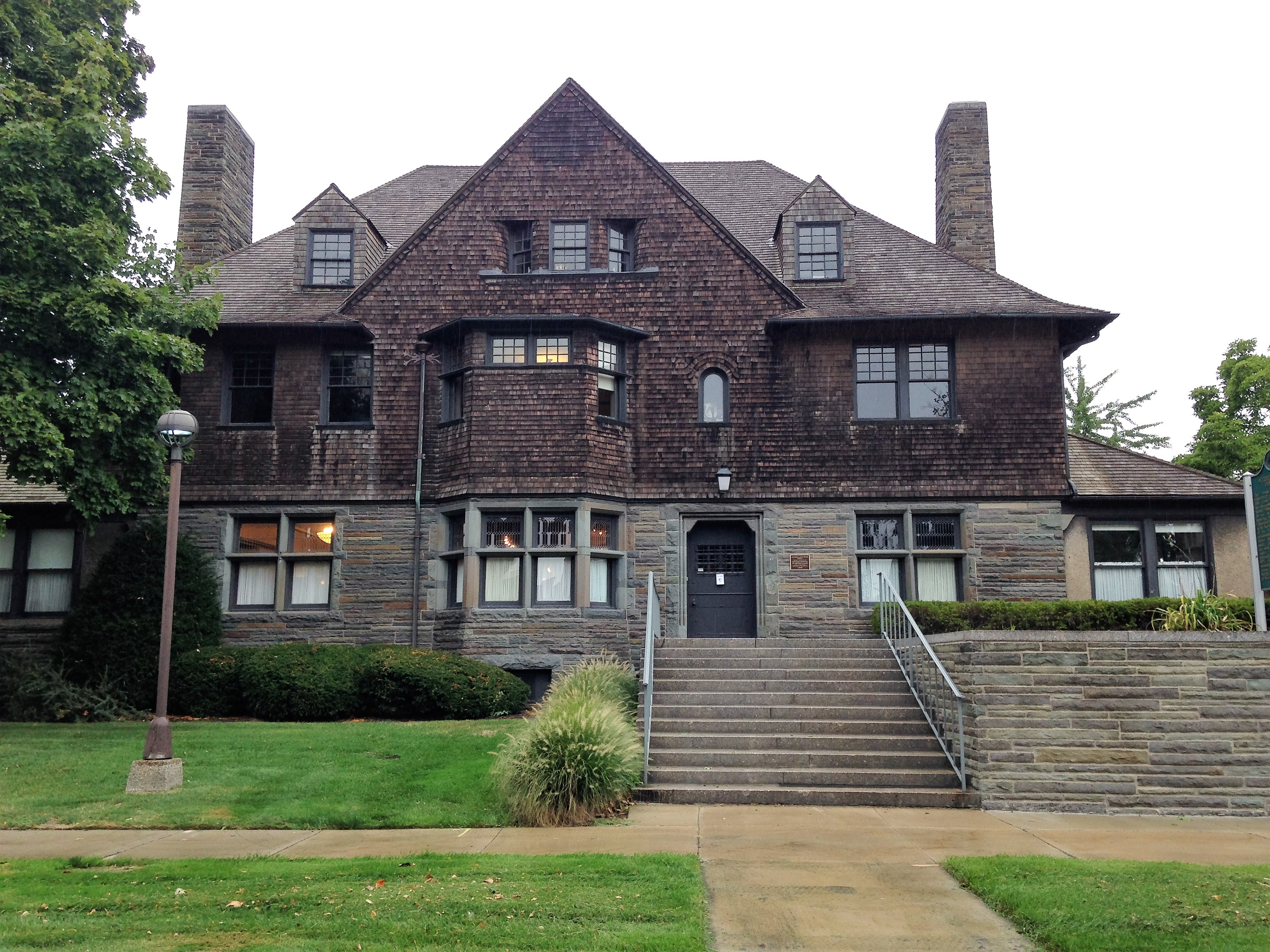
From humble beginnings in the Hudson Valley to the Charles Lang Freer house, Detroit, Michigan

In the late 19th century, Freer's health declined markedly. The economic depression of the 1890s paired with the stress of Freer's position within the company caused both physical and psychological trauma to the industrialist. Freer was diagnosed with neurasthenia, a nervous condition widespread among the upper-class in the United States. Treatment for neurasthenia included long periods of rest, and men were encouraged to pursue activities in the wilderness. Freer's treatment included outings in the Canadian wilderness and the Catskills. In addition to travel as a means of therapy, in the 1880s Freer started collecting art. In 1899, Freer retired from industry, focusing his time and efforts on collecting art and travel.

=== Death ===
Freer died in 1919 while staying at the Gotham Hotel at Fifth Avenue and 55th Street, New York City of what was described as a stroke of apoplexy. He left the bulk of his art collection, more than 5000 objects, to the federal government; it is now housed in the Freer Gallery of Art, Smithsonian Institution. Freer had no wife or children. The legacy of Charles Lang Freer is not just his wealth or art collection, but it is also his generosity as a patron to artists and the public. The boy who left school to work in a cement factory ultimately presented the United States its very first collection of Fine Art.

== Art collection ==
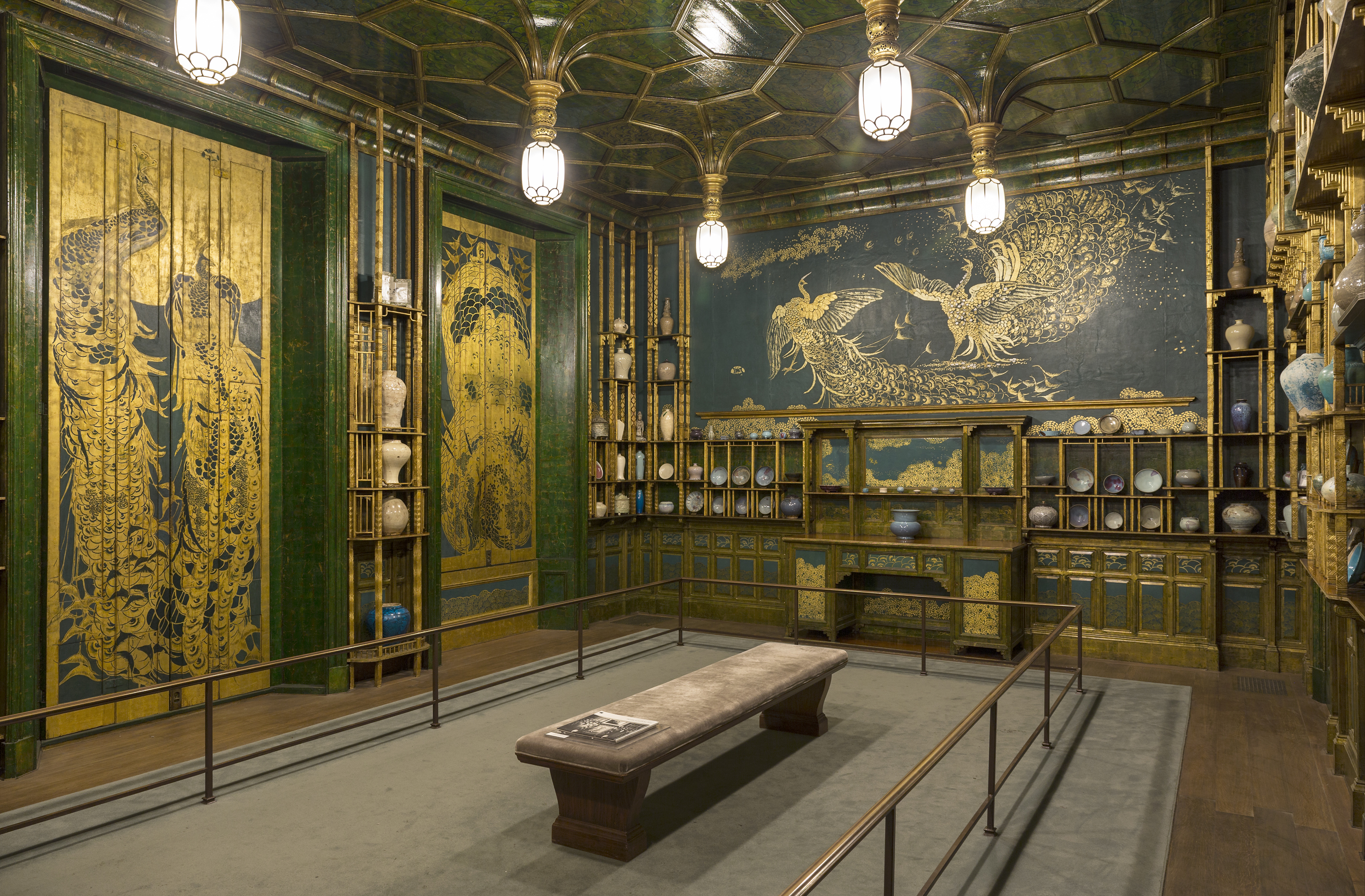
James McNeil Whistler, The Peacock Room, 1876-1877, Leather, Wood, Oil Paint, Canvas, Freer Gallery of Art

Freer is known for his collection of late nineteenth century American painting and Asian art, developed largely after his retirement in 1899. Yet, the industrialist had begun collecting art and prints sixteen years prior, in 1883, when Freer purchased a selection of Old Masters prints from New York dealer, Frederick Keppel. His interests continued to grow in subsequent years through personal and professional connections. These relationships fundamentally shaped the collecting principles and philosophy of the collector. Two friendships, however, stand out for the effect they had on the collector and deserve further explanation. The first is with painter, James McNeill Whistler, who is largely considered to be the catalyst for Freer's Asian collection, while the second is with Asian art scholar, Ernest Fenollosa, who helped shape Freer's view of collecting.

=== Freer and Whistler ===
Freer's interest in Whistler was born in a New York City bachelor pad belonging to lawyer and art collector, Howard Mansfield, in 1887. According to Mansfield, when Freer saw Whistler's etchings, he was instantly drawn to the pieces the artist produced. Only three years later, in 1890, Freer introduced himself to Whistler, while on his first trip to London. It was not long before the artist and industrialist became fast friends, spending long stretches of time together traveling. Freer, during this period, also began amassing what would ultimately become the largest collection of Whistler works in the world. The two remained close friends and confidantes until Whistler's death in 1903.

Whistler is commonly associated as being the inspiration for Freer's collection of Japanese prints and paintings. Although scholars debate why Freer began concentrating on collecting Asian Art, records indicate that his first purchase, a Japanese Rimpa fan painting, occurred in 1887. This predates his established relationship with the painter. There is no reason to believe that Freer's taste, whether it predated Whistler or not, was not influenced by his friend. His influence, however, may be seen in the other American artists collected by Freer. In addition to Whistler, Freer developed large collections of the artists Dwight Tyron, Abbott Thayer, Thomas W. Dewing, and Frederick Church. Tyron, Thayer, Dewing, and Whistler all contributed to Freer's Detroit mansion, designed by Aesthetic Movement architect, Wilson Eyre in 1890.

=== Freer and Fenollosa ===
Although they met in the early 1890s, it wasn't until 1901 that Freer developed an important relationship with Ernest Fenollosa, the son of a Spanish immigrant, and authority on the art of China and Japan. Fenollosa, who lived and worked in Japan from 1880 through 1890, taught Philosophy and Logic at the Imperial University of Tokyo. During his tenure in Japan, Fenollosa studied art history, criticism, and methodology and applied what he learned to Japanese art and culture. Fenollosa published widely, both in English and Japanese, and in 1889 the Museum of Fine Arts Boston offered him the curatorship of the recently developed Japanese Art department. Fenollosa's choice to divorce his wife in 1895 led to his subsequent resignation from the Museum of Fine Arts Boston in the summer of 1896.

For nearly ten years, Fenollosa advised and Freer acquired voraciously. From 1901 to 1908, Freer purchased the majority of the Japanese and Chinese paintings that he would later gift to the Smithsonian. Their partnership was lucrative, as Fenollosa's counsel gave Freer an edge in an increasingly competitive art market. In return, Freer organized speaking engagements for Fenollosa and acquired objects from the academic.

=== Freer and John C. Ferguson ===
On his trip to China in 1910-1911, Freer struck up a relation with and purchased important Chinese paintings and bronzes from John Calvin Ferguson, who had come as a missionary to China in 1887 and had become an expert in Chinese painting. Ferguson also introduced Freer to Chinese officials and collectors, and helped develop a relation with Duan Fang and other important collectors. Freer and Ferguson differed in their tastes, however, as Ferguson preferred Ming and Qing styles. Freer was later asked to appraise a group of paintings Ferguson offered to the Metropolitan Museum, and recommended the purchase only of the earlier paintings, not the Ming and Qing items.

=== Core Beliefs ===
Freer's philosophy was clear when it came to collecting. In their book Freer: A Legacy of Art, Thomas Lawton and Linda Merrill describe Freer's belief as a system in which "a masterpiece required neither explanation nor cultural context to communicate its message: its importance lay in its aesthetic integrity, not in the evidence it might incidentally provide about religious, social, political, or economic issues". This belief is solidified by Freer's preference for subtle works that belied simple analysis. Freer also behaved unlike other patrons of his time. Beyond purchasing works, Freer developed friendships with the artists he supported and lent works from his collections to exhibitions, to provide the greatest professional exposure to the painters in his stable. There is also indication that Freer had been thinking of a museum project long before it was proposed to the Smithsonian. In the summer of 1900, Freer traveled through Venice, Munich, Nuremberg, Dresden, Berlin, Hamburg and Cologne. While in these cities he visited the major ethnological museums, where he drew floor plans and wrote note in a journal.

=== Scope of Collection ===
James McNeill Whistler, La Princesse du Pays de la porcelain, 1863-1865, oil paint, Freer Gallery of Art.

In addition to the 2,250 objects set promised in the original gift to the Smithsonian, Freer collected avidly for the duration of his life. In 1920, after his death, 9,500 objects were transferred from Detroit to Washington, DC, nearly quadrupling the holdings of the collection. Among these works were 1,189 pieces by Whistler, the largest collection of the artist's work in the world, 3,400 Chinese works, 1,863 Japanese, 1,697 Egyptian, 513 from India and the Middle East, 451 from Korea, 200 works of 19th century American masters, and 200 miscellaneous objects. The museum continued to acquire new works, adding nearly 2000 additional objects in its first fifty years. The historian Warren Cohen concludes that Freer and Ferguson were primarily responsible for the "golden age" of East Asian art collecting. Freer's money and taste and connoisseurship made it possible for the public to see and study a much more diverse body of art, and influenced the shift in American taste away from decorative and ornate works.

== Freer Gallery of Art ==
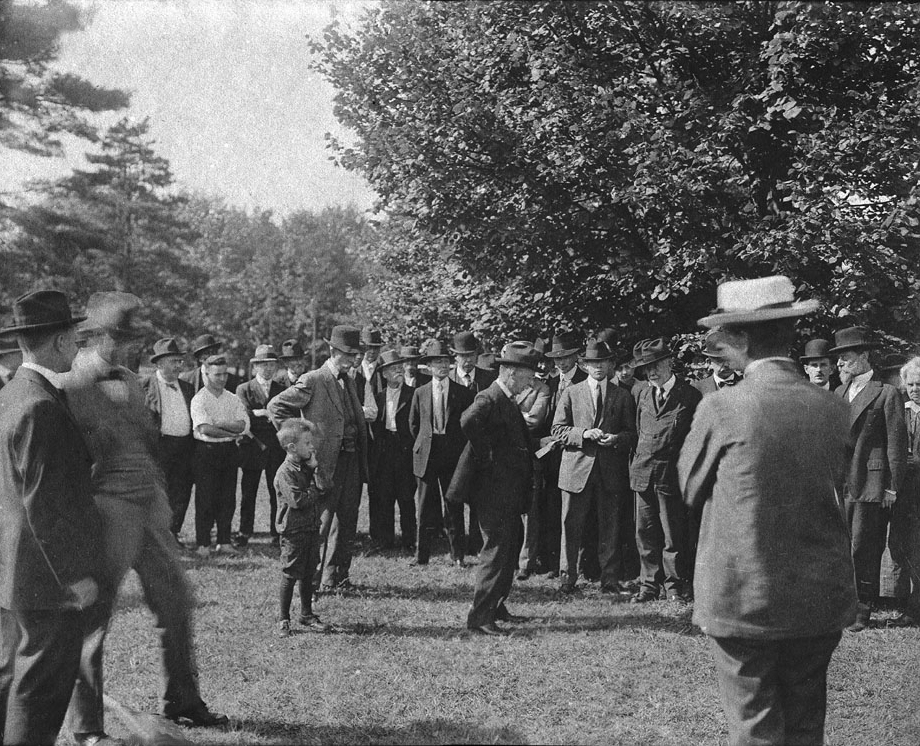
The 1916 groundbreaking ceremony for the Freer Gallery of Art

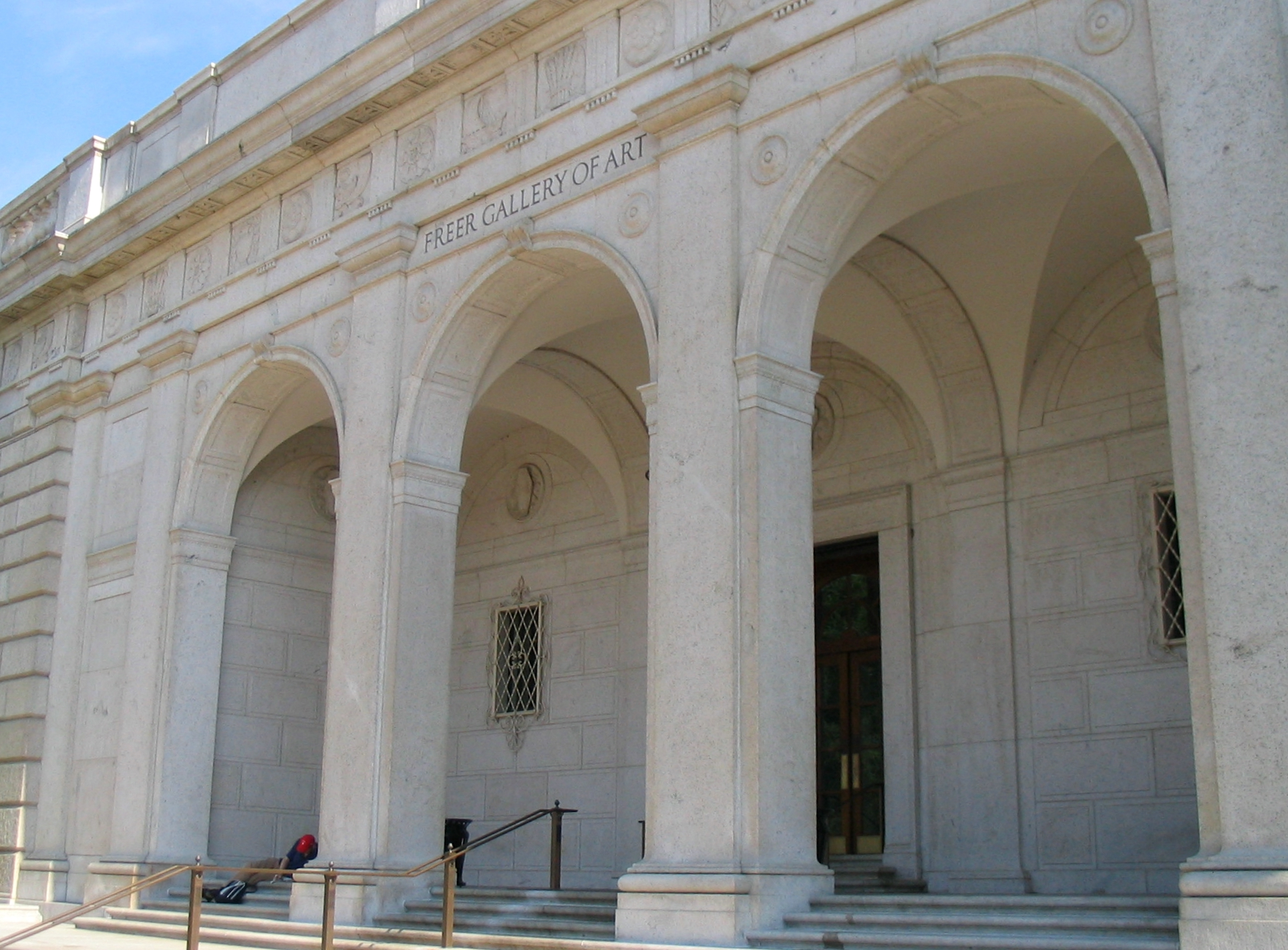
Exterior of the Freer Gallery, a part of the Smithsonian Institution, along the Mall at Washington DC.

On December 15, 1905, Freer sent U.S. President Theodore Roosevelt a letter in which Freer outlined his initial bequest offer. James McMillan, Freer's friend, U.S. Senator, and partner in the Michigan Car Company, championed the idea of a shaping Washington, DC into a beautiful capital city. His influence helped guide Freer's offer towards Washington. Negotiations continued for the next five months, stalled briefly by Samuel P. Langley, the director of the Smithsonian Institution. In May 1906, the Regents of the Smithsonian Institution accepted Freer's gift on behalf of the United States Government.

Freer's gift, provided not only his collection but also the building and initial endowment was the first of its kind in U.S. history. Despite this, Freer's initial bequest was thorough, including an inventory of 2,250 objects that Freer would retain until his death. It also outlined that Freer's new acquisitions would stay with the patron until his death.

In 1918 and 1919, Freer placed provisions in his will, further bolstering the structure he established in the 1906 gift. The first provision established an income stream, sourced from stocks and cash dividends, to ensure that the museum employed a highly skilled curator. The patron designated two additional funds to decorate and maintain the museum grounds, specifically interior and exterior ornamental gardens. Once met, Freer established further stipulations. Freer mandated that residuary incomes from his estate continue to support a scholarship for Asian and Middle Eastern studies and acquire new works from Asia, Egypt, and the Middle East. Within the acquisition addition, Freer included a detailed stipulation. All new acquisitions must be approved by the Fine Arts National Commission and a panel of the collector's close friends and confidantes.

In his most stringent restriction, Freer stated that the museum may not accept gifts of works of art for the permanent collection. The Museum was also forbidden to display works of art that were not part of the permanent collection. Finally, once brought into the permanent collection, no piece of art was permitted to be loaned out.

In 1916, construction began on what is now known as the Freer Gallery in Washington. The building cost a million dollars, all of which was paid by Freer. Completion was delayed by World War I and the gallery was not opened until 1923.

== Works ==
- 1912 Catalogue of a selection of art objects from the Freer collection exhibited in the new building of the National museum, April 15 to June 15, 1912

== Other ==
Freer is known not only as an industrialist and art collector, but also as a prolific writer. His correspondence and telegrams with James McNeill Whistler have been published and are noted within the art community. Freer also maintained decades-long correspondence with other notable American art collectors and patrons.

A few of these early patrons went on to establish collections similar in importance (if not necessarily volume) to that of Freer. See The Phillips Collection, The Vess Collection, The Roosevelt Collection, and others.

The Detroit Century Box, a time capsule, contains a letter written by Freer in 1900.

Freer spent part of his life in Capri where he owned the famous Villa Castello, together with Thomas Spencer Jerome, a socialite, clubman and lawyer from Detroit. A detailed report of Freer life in Italy, at the time of the Capri renaissance, is testified in the book of Carlo Knight, The Tiberio's Lawyer - The Tragic Life and death of Thomas Spencer Jerome.

== See also ==
- Biblical Manuscripts in the Freer Collection
- Charles Lang Freer medal
