= Frenchtown Historic District =

Historic district in Missouri, United States

- U.S. National Register of Historic Places
- U.S. Historic district
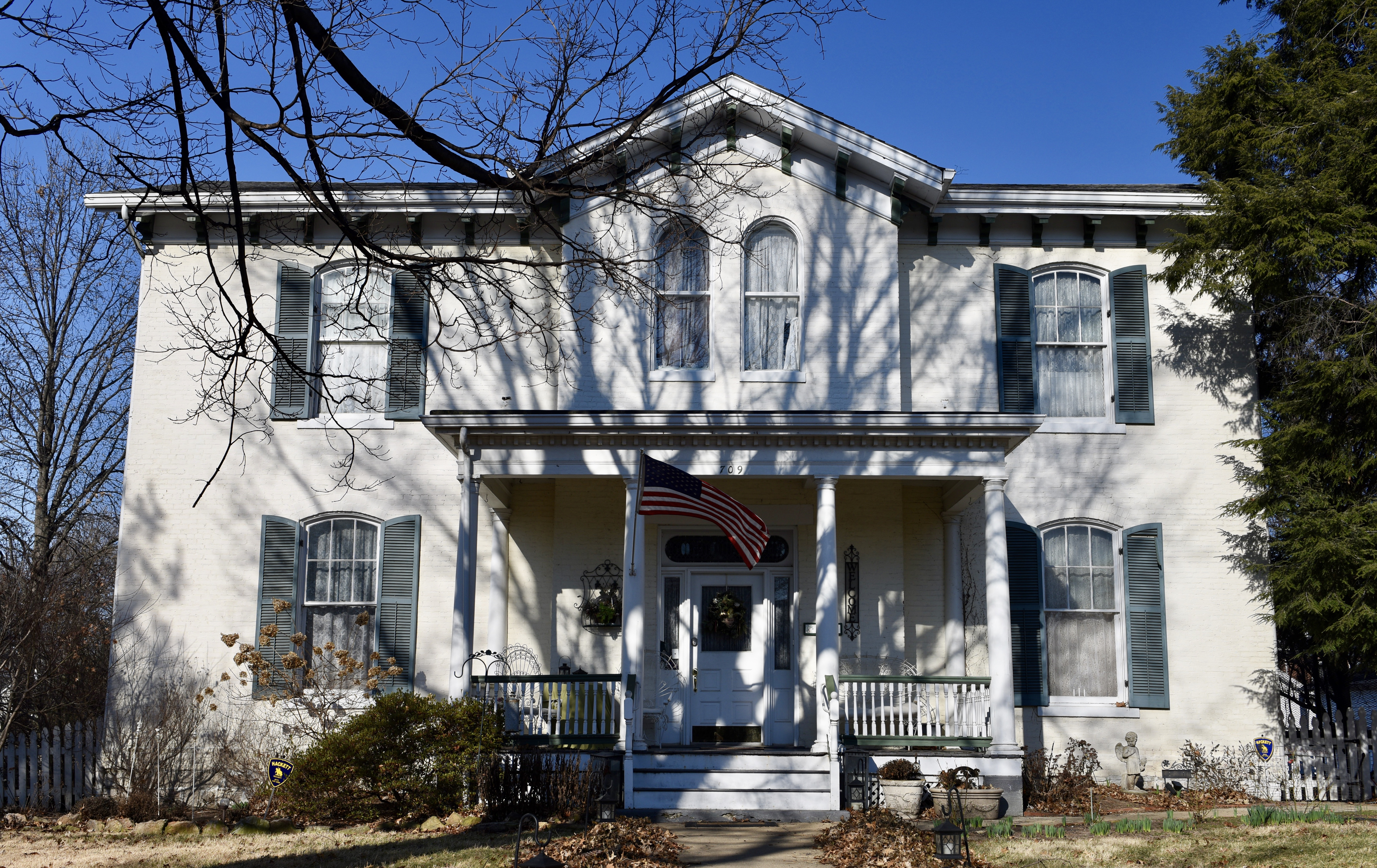

- Location within Missouri Location within the United States
- Location: Roughly bounded by N. Fifth, Clark and French Sts. and the Missouri R., St. Charles, Missouri
- Coordinates: 38°47′19″N 90°28′48″W
- Area: 102.6 acres (41.5 ha)
- Architect: Platte, John Joseph; Wessbecher, Louis
- Architectural style: Greek Revival, Late Victorian, Colonial, French Colonial
- NRHP reference No.: 91000216
- Added to NRHP: March 14, 1991

Frenchtown Historic District is a national historic district located at St. Charles, St. Charles County, Missouri. The district encompasses 205 contributing buildings and 1 contributing structure in the Frenchtown section of St. Charles. It developed between about 1830 and 1940, and includes representative examples of Greek Revival style, Late Victorian style and Colonial style architecture. The district includes an industrial complex associated with the St. Charles Car Company, founded in 1873, and later known as the American Car and Foundry Company.

It was added to the National Register of Historic Places in 1991.
