= Peninsular Car Company =

Rolling stock manufacturer

The Peninsular Car Company was a railroad rolling stock manufacturer, founded by Charles L. Freer and Frank J. Hecker in 1885.

In 1892, the company merged with Michigan Car Company, the Russel Wheel and Foundry Company, the Detroit Car Wheel Company and several smaller manufacturers to form the Michigan-Peninsular Car Company.

== Sources ==
- Willis F. Dunbar and George S. May. Michigan: A History of the Wolverine State. 3rd Revised Ed., (Grand Rapids: William B. Eerdmans, 1995), 413–4.
