= Edwards Rail Car Company (1997–2008) =

Rolling stock manufacturer

Edwards Rail Car Company (1997–2008) was located in Montgomery, Alabama, specializing in the manufacture of self-propelled rail cars patterned after original Edwards designs dating from the mid-1920s. Edward's also restored and manufactured other types of rail cars, including streetcars.

Rebirth of the Edwards Company came in the fall of 1997 when Vintage Rail Consultant Steven Torrico saw and rode on his first Edwards car, an ex-CB&Q Model-25. 2008 was the last year of manufacturing at the Montgomery facility.

As of 12/1/08 Edwards Rail Car no longer manufacturers rail cars at the Montgomery facility. Current plans are to relocate to the original Edwards facility in Sanford, North Carolina.

== Rail cars ==
The standard Edwards Rail Car was designed and recommended for branch line service where traffic requirements are within its capacity, for high speed operation, on roadbeds where the grades are not too severe.

Three types of propulsion systems, mechanical, Diesel-electric or hydrostatic driven were available. The mechanically driven car employs the use of engine, transmission, final drive gear box with sprockets and chains to deliver power to the driving wheels. Cars equipped with electric propulsion have an engine which turns a generator for providing electricity for the traction motors. Hydrostatic propulsion employs the use of diesel engine to power a hydraulic pump which supplies pressurized fluid to two 100 H.P. hydraulic motors on the front truck, in place of the final drive gear box as per the mechanical set-up for the standard Model-20.

== Streetcars ==
Edwards Rail Car Company manufactured several streetcars, to a modified Peter Witt streetcar design.

== Restoration services ==
Edwards Rail Car was awarded a contract to facilitate some aspects of the restoration of John Ringling's private business car, the Wisconsin. Originally built by Pullman in 1905, it was used by the Ringling family for travel with the circus. The Wisconsin is on display at the John and Mable Ringling Museum of Art in Sarasota, Florida.

== See also ==
- Doodlebug
