= Helix Dumper =

A Helix Dumper is a rail transport and unloading solution, designed for continuous rolling discharge of bulk commodities. Originally developed for the iron ore industry, the Helix Dumper system can handle many types of fine-grained and potentially sticky commodities. When the Helix Dumper wagon enters the unloading area, a wheel at the top of the wagon makes contact with the spiral-shaped rigid guide that constitutes the unloading station. As the wheel travels along the path of the guide, the wagon chassis remains on the rails while the body of the wagon is rotated 148 degrees to dump its load. After the rotation, the direction of the guide changes and the wagon body is returned to its normal position. The Helix Dumper has a discharge rate of up to 25,000 tonnes per hour.

The discharge process is powered by the locomotive, which pulls the unbroken train set through the unloading station. The Helix Dumper unloading station has no moving or motorised parts and requires no additional power supply.

== Alternatives ==
The main alternatives to the Helix Dumper system are bottom dumping systems and rotary car dumper systems.

== See also ==
- Bulk material handling
- Bulk cargo
- Rotary car dumper
- Iron ore
