= María Juana =

Town in Santa Fe Province, Argentina

Coordinates: 31°41′S 61°44′W

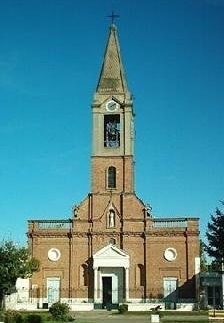
María Juana

María Juana is a town in the province of Santa Fe, Argentina, located 125 km from the provincial capital (Santa Fe) and 210 km from the province's largest city, Rosario. It has a population of about 5,000.

The main economic activity in the area is the production of milk and derivative dairy products, but María Juana also produces and exports soy, wheat, honey, and industrial products.

Populated mainly by descendants from Italian immigrants, María Juana has two elementary schools and three high schools. It has had a cable television system (Cable-Hogar María Juana) since the early 1990s; and Radio María Juana FM 101.9, founded in 1978, one of the few alternative radio stations in Argentina that broadcasts worldwide through internet streaming.

== Notable natives ==
- Diego Bustos, CNN en Español anchor.
