= Diego Bustos (anchorman) =

Argentine journalist

Diego A. Bustos (born March 20 in Maria Juana, Argentina) is a media personality with over 20 years of experience managing, producing and hosting TV shows and events in the sports, entertainment and travel industries for CNN en Español, CNN International, UCVTV, Channel 13, FIA Formula E and Extreme E.

Bustos has spent the majority of his career as a Senior Anchor for CNN en Español and CNN International, but prior to his tenure at CNN he worked as an anchor for Telefe in his native Argentina.

For CNN he has covered multiple World Cups and Olympic Games, the Augusta Masters, FIA Formula E, the World Series and Super Bowl. Along with attending such high profile events, Bustos has conducted interviews with athletes and sports authorities as well as executives and personalities from different industries around the world.

Bustos holds Peabody Awards 2005, 2008 and 2010, and Du Pont-Columbia Award 2005 in CNN news coverage.

== Career highlights ==
Senior Anchor, Reporter and Commentator for CNN en Español and CNN International managing, producing, and/or hosting the following programs:

- “Vive el Golf, presented by Rolex”—Featured many golf courses in Latin America, plus iconic courses in the United States, Beijing, Johannesburg, Scotland
- “Deportes CNN”—Host of a daily sports newscast with the latest information in the world of sports
- “Encuentro”— Occasionally replacing Daniel Viotto. Host of a daily one-hour show touching on a variety of subjects: breaking news, interviews about politics, sports, showbiz, entertainment, health, economy, fashion, and technology
- “La Cara Humana” (The Human Face)—Host and Co-Producer of 30 special one-hour episodes about the human consequences of the invasion in Iraq in 2003
- “Destinos” (Destinations)—Host and Co-Producer of a travel magazine show throughout Latin America

Senior Anchor, Reporter and Commentator at:

- Augusta Masters 2018, 2015, 2014, 2013, 2012, 2011, 2010, 2009, 2008, 2007, 2006
- FIFA World Cups—Brazil 2014, South Africa 2010, Germany 2006, South Korea / Japan 2002, France 1998.
- IOC Olympic Games—Rio 2016, Beijing 2008, Athens 2004
- Copa America —Venezuela 2007, Perú 2004
- Panam Games - Dominican Republic 2003, Winnipeg 1999
- Among several other events

== Interviews ==
- Golf— Tiger Woods, USGA, R&A, Augusta National executives, Matt Kuchar, Ángel Cabrera, Sergio García, Butch Harmon, Lorena Ochoa, Chi Chi Rodríguez, Jhonattan Vegas, Miguel Ángel Carballo, Eduardo Romero, Andrés Romero, Felipe Aguilar, Camilo Villegas
- Football—Lionel Messi, Joseph Blatter, Diego Maradona, Pelé, Ronaldinho, many others.
- Baseball—Alex Rodriguez, Sammy Sosa, Andrés Galarraga, Dennis Martinez, others.
- Basketball— Kobe Bryant, Manu Ginóbili, Esteban Batista, others.
- Boxing—Oscar de la Hoya, Felix "Tito" Trinidad.
- NASCAR— Emerson Fittipaldi, Juan Pablo Montoya.
- Formula E— CEO Alejandro Agag, Alberto Longo, drivers Felipe Massa, Lucas di Grassi, Nelson Piquet Jr, Felix Da Costa, José María López, others.
