= Schneider's Combination Cars =

Convertible railroad cars

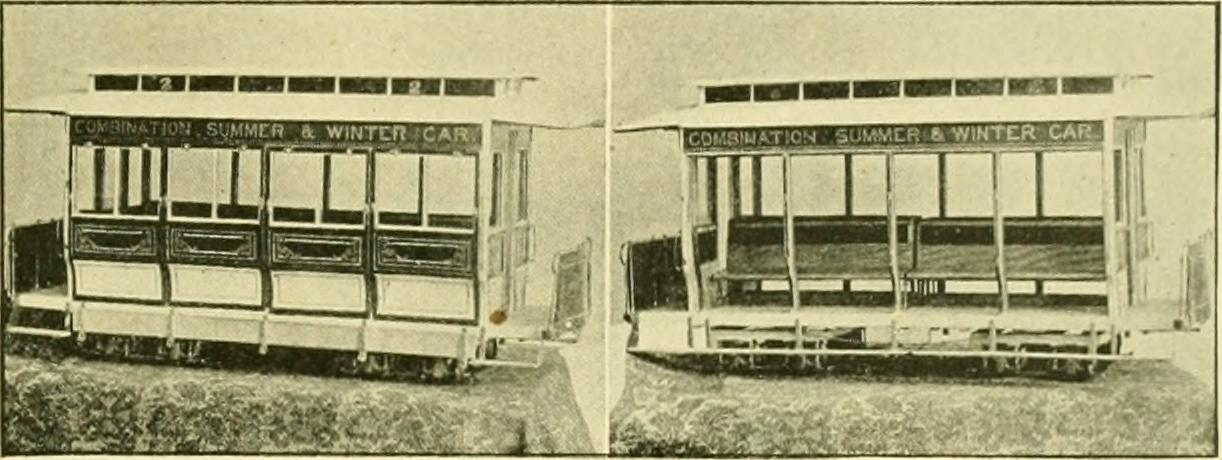
Combination closed and open car made from a converted open car

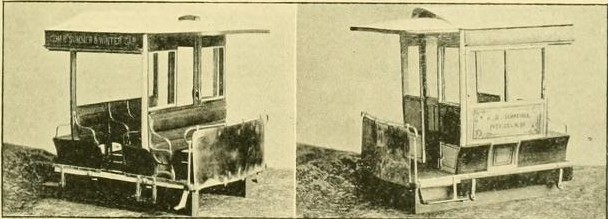
Combination open and closed car made from a converted box car

Schneider's Combination Cars were streetcars invented by J. G. Schneider of Chicago around 1891, as convertible open and closed cars for use in summer and winter respectively.

== Concept ==
J. G. Schneider of Chicago invented and patented two types of adjustable car to meet the demand from many railroads for reconstructing their old cars, and also to accommodate those smaller companies who desired open and closed cars but who did not feel justified in maintaining two full sets of rolling stock.

One was a winter car that could readily be converted to an open car by the removal of the outer panels, which were made in sections and held in place at the bottom with two dowels and locks, which operated with a button at either side of each panel. These panels had rubber casings to prevent rattle and jar and make them perfectly tight. When the box car became an open one by removing the panels, the seats were turned over so as to face outward while extending lengthwise as in a closed car. This left space for the conductor to pass through for collections.

The panels could be quickly removed, and could be painted when not in use in summer, thus reducing the time car must otherwise spend in shop. To rebuild an open car into closed, an aisle was sawed through the cross seats and the panels put on the outside. In summer the seat thus taken out was replaced and panels removed, so that the car resumed its original appearance. The running footboard of the open pattern could be either folded up against the side of the car or removed entirely for the season. Also, the upholstered portion of the seat could be removed when the seat was turned for summer use and the cushion put away. Models of each type of car were exhibited and described at a convention in Pittsburg in 1891.
