= Frank J. Hecker =

American businessman (1846–1927)

Colonel Frank J. Hecker
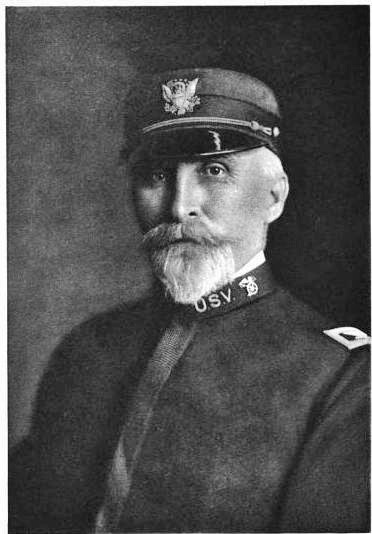
- Born: Frank Joseph Hecker; July 6, 1846; Freedom, Michigan
- Died: June 26, 1927 (aged 80); Detroit, Michigan
- Burial place: Woodlawn Cemetery
- Occupation: president of the Peninsular Car Company

Signature
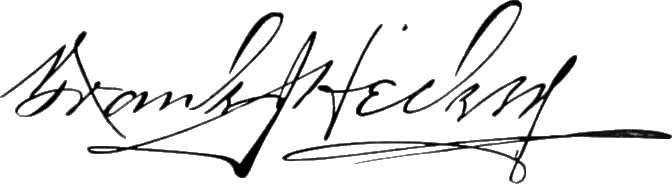

Frank Joseph Hecker (July 6, 1846 – June 26, 1927) was an American businessman in the railroad-car manufacturing business. Hecker was from Detroit, Michigan.

== Early life ==
Frank J. Hecker was born in Freedom, Michigan (in Washtenaw County) on July 6, 1846. His family moved to Waterloo, Illinois in 1859, where Frank was educated. During the American Civil War, he joined the Union Army in 1864, and was appointed first sergeant.

== Business ==
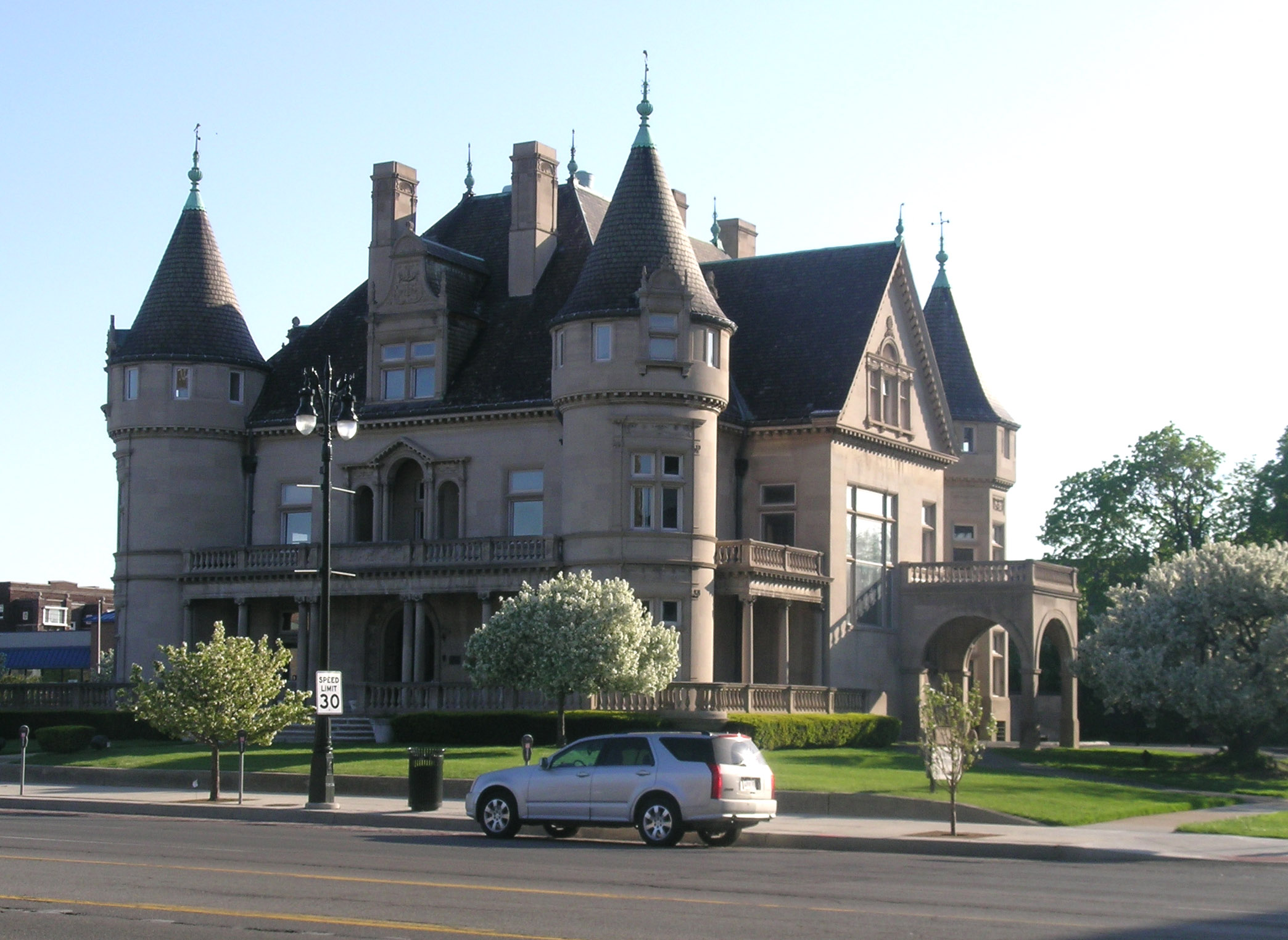
Col. Frank J. Hecker House on Woodward in Detroit

After the conclusion of the Civil War, he was hired on as an agent for the Union Pacific Railroad. In the 1870s, a group of investors from Detroit decided to build a rail line near Logansport, Indiana; they hired Hecker to manage their project. Hecker took on the project, taking a younger Charles Lang Freer with him. Although the project fell through, the Detroit investors were pleased with Hecker's work and invited him to Detroit. There, in 1879, Hecker and Freer organized the Peninsular Car Works, which in 1884 was renamed into the Peninsular Car Company. Hecker was president of both companies, and business made both Hecker and Freer wealthy. Hecker also was on boards of the Detroit Copper and Brass Rolling Mills, Michigan Fire and Marine Insurance Company, and the Detroit Lumber Company.

== Politics ==
Hecker was appointed Police Commissioner in 1888. He unsuccessfully ran for Congress in 1892, and was later a delegate to the Republican National Convention in 1900. During the Spanish–American War, Hecker joined the Army once more, where he was put in charge of transporting Spanish prisoners. In 1899, he was commissioned as a colonel. This service brought him to the attention of President Theodore Roosevelt, who in 1904 appointed Hecker to the Panama Canal Commission.

== Home ==
Hecker is perhaps best known for the construction of the Col. Frank J. Hecker House, located on Woodward Avenue in Detroit. The mansion is on the National Register of Historic Places. Charles Lang Freer's home is next door.

In 1868, Hecker married Anna M. Williamson of Omaha, Nebraska. The couple had five children: Frank Clarence, Anna Cynthia, Louise May, Christian Henry, and Grace Clara. Frank Hecker died from heart failure at his home in Detroit on June 26, 1927, and was buried at Woodlawn Cemetery.
