= Edwards Rail Car Company =

- Industry: Rail transport
- Founded: 1921; 105 years ago
- Defunct: 1942
- Headquarters: Sanford, North Carolina, USA
- Area served: Western Hemisphere
- Key people: Harry P. Edwards
- Products: Railcars

Edwards Rail Car Company was an American company which operated in Sanford, North Carolina, from 1921 to 1942. It specialized in the manufacture of self-propelled rail cars. By some estimates, the company built 100 rail cars, one-third of which were sent to Central and South America.

In 2000, the company name was resurrected by a company in Tavares, Florida, which was later based in Montgomery, Alabama.

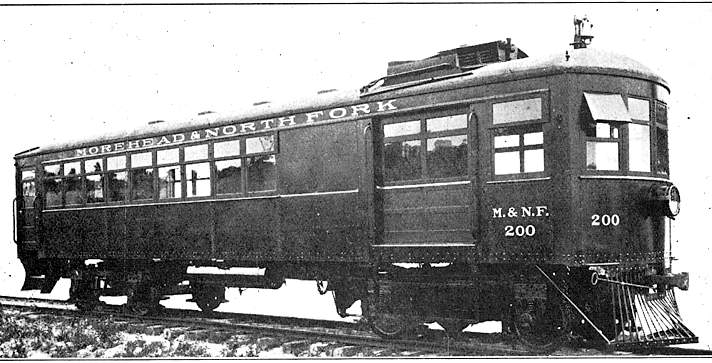
Edwards Model 20 railcar

== History ==
Harry P. Edwards began building passenger railway equipment in 1917 and formed the Edwards Railway Motor Car Company in 1921. Edwards turned out over 130 cars over a two-decade span and made a name for itself among major South and Central American railways, as well as on U.S. Class 1 and short line railroads.

=== Formative years ===
In 1915 the Atlantic and Western Railway, a short line running from Sanford to Lillington, N.C., was running an uneconomical steam passenger train which A&W General Manager Harry P. Edwards came to regard with mounting frustration. Searching for a way to stem the flow of red ink, Edwards built his first car for use on that railroad. Other cars were built in the shops of the A&W and marketed by Edwards and the Atlantic & Western Railway.

As the word spread throughout the South about the economical rail cars built by Edwards, the demand for cars was such that in 1921 the manufacturing firm Edwards Railway Motor Car Co. was organized and in 1922 occupied its new plant along the tracks of the A&W. The short line was not only an Edwards customer, but its tracks served as a test, demonstration and development track for over twenty years of Edwards car production.

=== 1920–1942 ===
During the early 1920s, mainstays of this output was the Model-10 which had the engine mounted up in the baggage compartment, as was the fashion of most all other manufacturers. In 1926 the company started delivery of the new Model-20. What set the Model-20 apart from the Model-10 and competitor's models was the ingenious, patented, power truck design, with the motor set into the front truck frame instead of being up in the car body.

In 1929 Edwards exported two Model 20 units to Argentina, for Ferrocarriles del Estado meter gauge lines. Both, named CM 1 and CM 2 went to Córdoba hills between Alta Córdoba and Capilla del Monte. Service last till 1937 when they were replaced by new streamlined trains built by Ganz of Hungary.

Both units were transferred to Santa Fe province, joining Maciel station with Puerto Gaboto a port on Parana River, that were first Spanish colonial setting in Argentina as Fort Santi Spiritu. Service was ended in 1966 and units were cut for scrap several years later.

Edwards output during the 1930s was mainly export cars including the "modern" streamlined Model-21 and the streamlined version of the Model-10, with their distinctive shovel-nose, first developed by Edwards in 1935. By the late 1930s sales of railcars in the United States was at an all-time low, and with the war in Europe, Edwards sold the plant and new owners re-tooled for defense production in 1940. The final rail car to be built was delivered in 1940. As of 1941, the company was a subcontractor for aircraft parts.

In 1942 the Edwards Company lost its corporate identity and ceased to exist, rail motor cars and trailers were the only Edwards products manufactured under that name. As of 1933 the company claimed rail car sales to forty-four railroads; final tally of original purchasers was close to fifty. With sales, in a 22-year period to nineteen countries in the Western Hemisphere.

== Preservation ==
Only a handful of Edwards cars have survived today. As of 2018, Birmingham & Southeastern was still operating a Model 10, manufactured by Edwards Rail Car Co. in 1923.

== See also ==
- Doodlebug
