= The Princess from the Land of Porcelain =

Painting by James Abbott McNeill Whistler

Rose and Silver: The Princess from the Land of Porcelain
- Artist: James McNeill Whistler
- Year: 1863–1865
- Medium: Oil on canvas
- Dimensions: 201.5 cm × 116.1 cm (79.3 in × 45.7 in)
- Location: Freer Gallery of Art, Washington, D.C.

Rose and Silver: The Princess from the Land of Porcelain (better known as The Princess from the Land of Porcelain; also known by the French title La Princesse du pays de la porcelaine) is an oil painting on canvas by American-born artist James McNeill Whistler. It was painted between 1863 and 1865. It currently hangs above the fireplace in The Peacock Room at the Freer Gallery of Art in Washington, D.C.

== Description ==
Princess depicts a European woman wearing a kimono worn in a Western manner, standing amidst numerous Asian art objects, including a rug, Japanese folding screen and a large decorative porcelain vase. She holds a hand fan and looks ahead "wistfully". The entirety is rendered in an impressionistic manner. The painting‘s frame is decorated with a similar motif to the painting, with interlocking circles and numerous rectangles.

At the time Whistler painted Princess, he often used large amounts of gold in his work, such as in his similarly themed Caprice in Purple and Gold No.2: The Gold Screen. Although the painting itself does not include gold or gold pigments, its yellow and ochre shades complement the gold and blue interior of its original setting while displayed at the home of British shipping magnate Frederick Leyland.

== Production ==
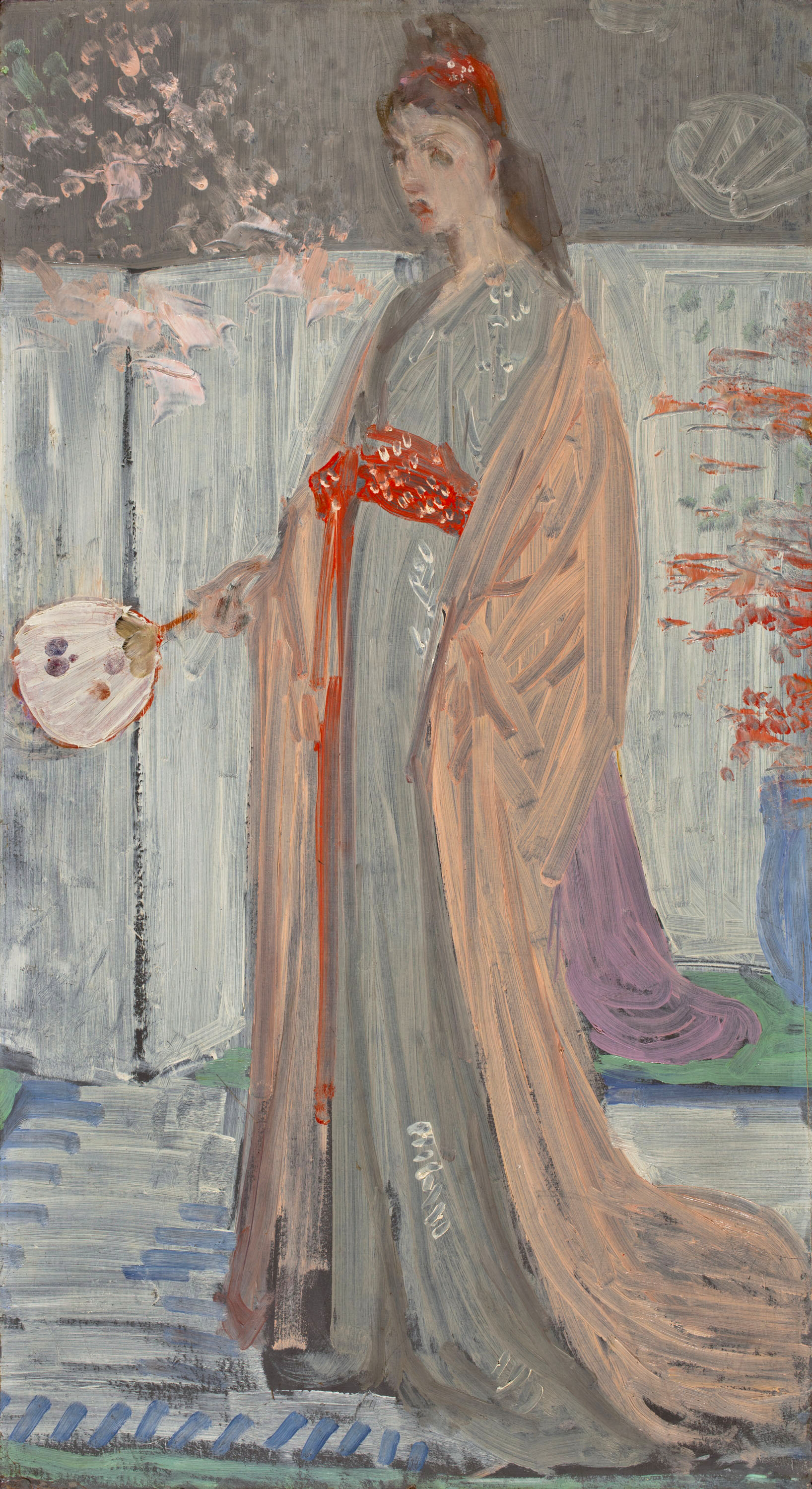
Sketch by Whistler, showing flowers which were later removed

Princess was painted between 1863 and 1865 by James Abbott McNeill Whistler, with Christine Spartali, the sister of Pre-Raphaelite artist Marie Spartali Stillman, serving as the model; Owen Edwards of Smithsonian Magazine describes Spartali as "an Anglo-Greek beauty whom all the artists of the day were clamoring to paint". Princess is one of several of Whistler's works painted during this period that depict a Western woman in Asian-styled surroundings and Asian-styled costume, a reflection of the current Anglo-Japanese trend and Art Nouveau aesthetic. As in several other of his works, Whistler used sketches to prepare the general layout of the composition. Other details were added in later. A surviving sketch depicts flowers, which were later eliminated from the work. The white Japanese folding screen in the background may have been one owned by Whistler.

== History ==
When the portrait was completed, Spartali's father refused to purchase it; Whistler's large signature at the top led another would-be buyer to withdraw. This may have led Whistler to develop his later butterfly-style signature.

The early history of the painting afterwards is fairly uncertain. In 1865 Princess was displayed at the Paris Salon. The following year, it was displayed at Gambart's French Gallery in London; when the exhibition finished, his friend Dante Gabriel Rossetti received the painting as Whistler was in South America at the time. It was then sold by either Rossetti or Joanna Hiffernan, Whistler's muse and lover, to an art collector thought to be Frederick Huth. Princess was returned to Whistler in 1867.

Several years later, the portrait was bought by Leyland He displayed Princess in a dining room filled with Kangxi ceramics, but was displeased how it had been decorated by a previous artist, Thomas Jeckyll. Whistler suggested that Leyland modify the coloring of the room to better accent his new acquisition; the redesign was later handled by Whistler himself, as Jeckyll was ill. The result was The Peacock Room. However, Whistler's modifications were more in-depth than those wished for by Leyland, resulting in a quarrel between the two.

In 1892, after Leyland's death, Princess was sold at Christie's in London to Alexander Reid for 420 guineas. Reid was a Glasgow art dealer who sold it to William Burrell a few years later.

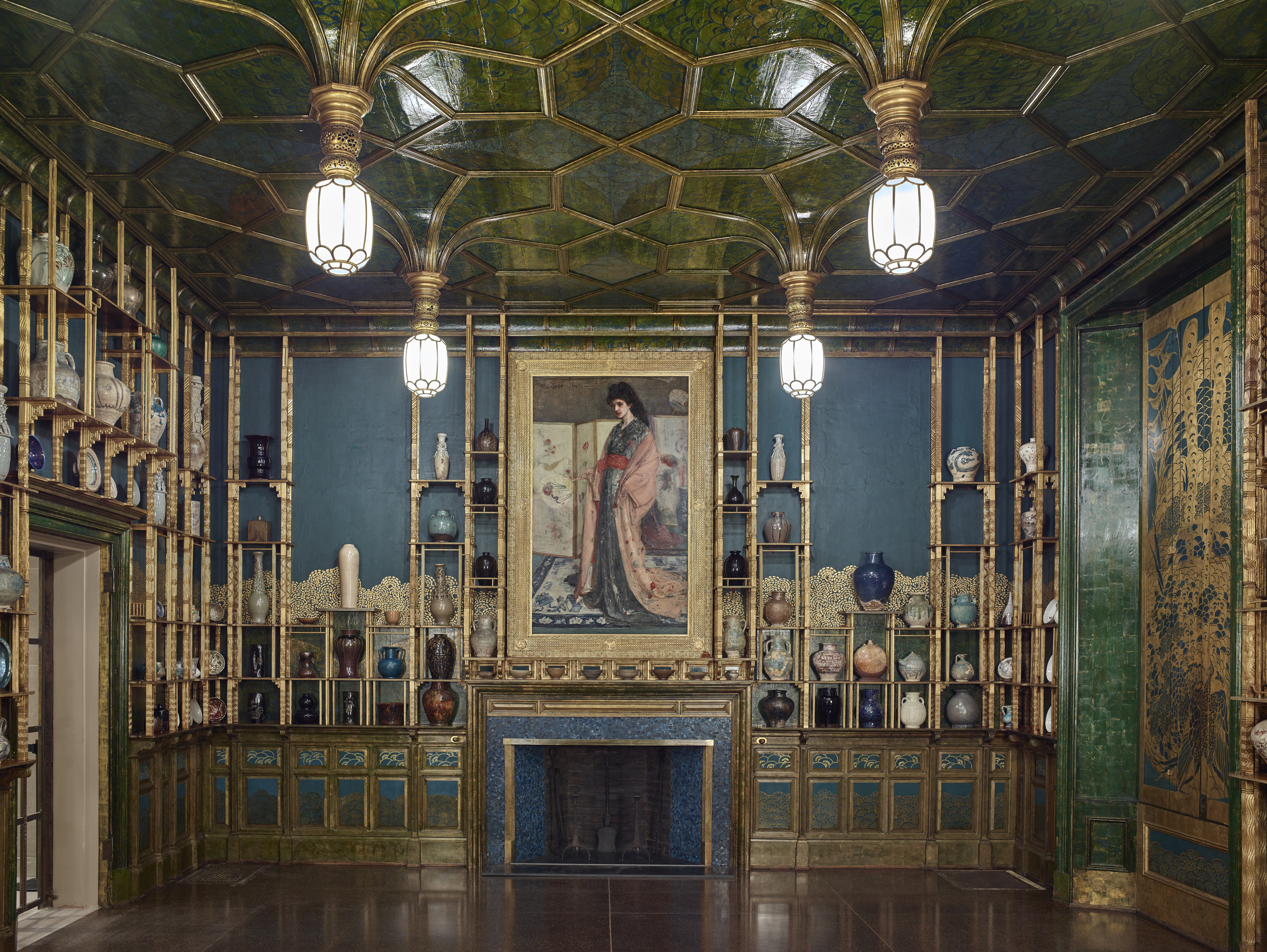
Princess, hanging over the fireplace in The Peacock Room at the Freer Gallery of Art

Princess was acquired by Charles Lang Freer on August 20, 1903, under the title The Princess of Porcelain for £3,750 (US$18,240) on Bond Street, in London. He kept it in his home in Detroit, Michigan; the following year he acquired The Peacock Room. In 1906 he donated both to the Smithsonian.

After Freer's death in 1919, both Princess and The Peacock Room were moved to the Freer Gallery of Art in Washington, D.C., a Smithsonian museum established by Freer. Princess continues to be housed in The Peacock Room at the Freer Gallery, shown hung above the fireplace amidst a rotating stock of Asian ceramics. In 2011, the Princess was digitized with over one gigapixel of resolution by the Google Art Project; this was achieved by assembling numerous smaller digital mosaics.

== Influences ==
Critics have seen influences of Japanese woodblock maker Kitagawa Utamaro in the painting, as well as 18th-century French chinoiserie stylings.

== Reception ==
In a review for the 1865 Paris Salon, Gustave Vattier wrote that the painting was not ready for display, saying that "a child's breath could blow it over"; (Note: Original: "... un soufle [sic] d'enfant la renverserait.") he also disagreed with the belief that Whistler was representing reality, writing that the painting was nothing but "whim and fantasy". (Note: Original: "... que du caprice et de la fantaisie.")

In her doctoral dissertation, Caroline Doswell Older wrote that, when viewed without its frame, Princess came across as a being like a closely cropped, carelessly taken photograph which seems as if it would be swallowed up by The Peacock Room. However, with its frame, she finds it an "aesthetic object with enough presence to hold its own" in the heavily decorated room.

== See also ==
- List of paintings by James McNeill Whistler
