= The Peacock Room =

Interior decorated by James McNeill Whistler and Thomas Jeckyll

Harmony in Blue and Gold: The Peacock Room
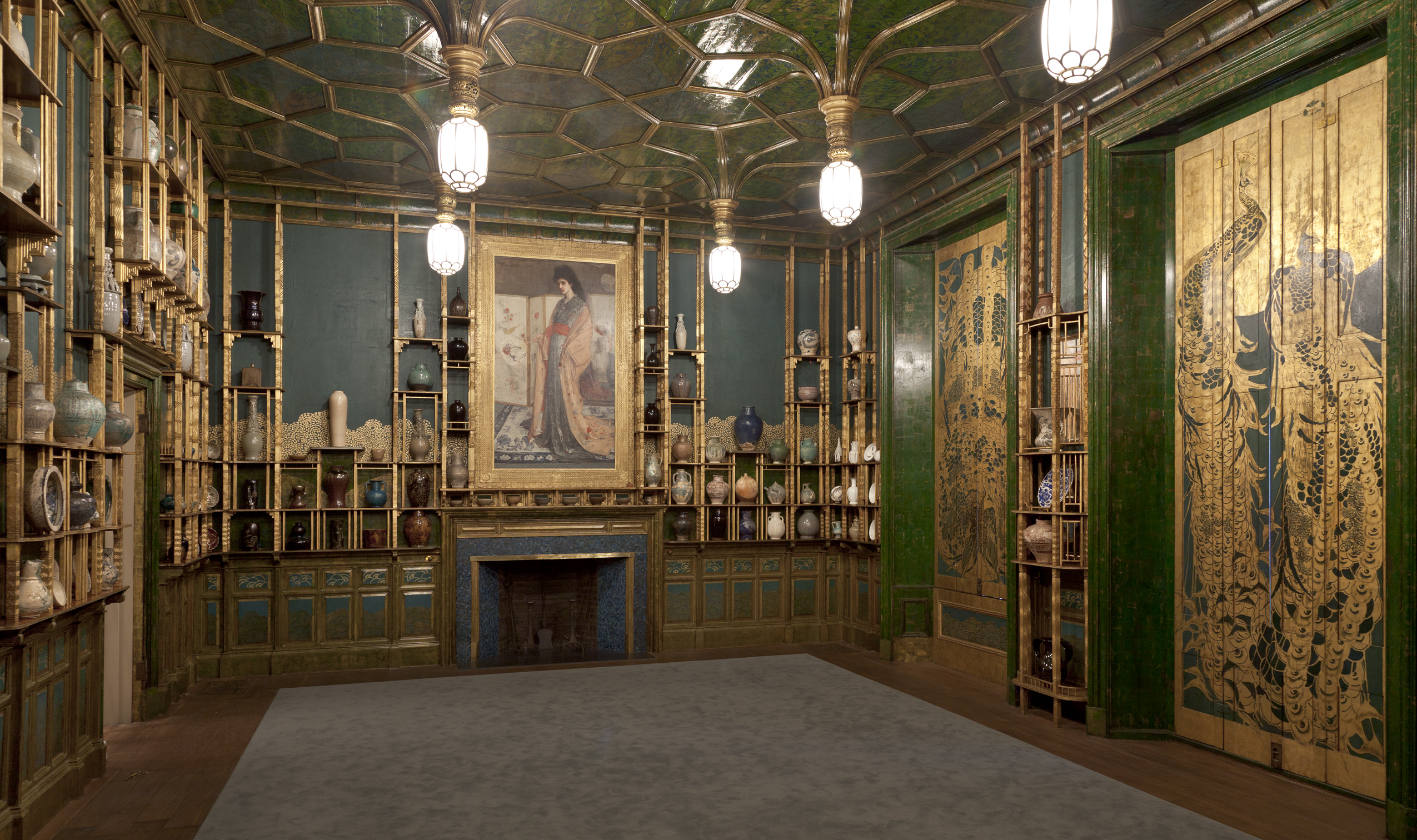
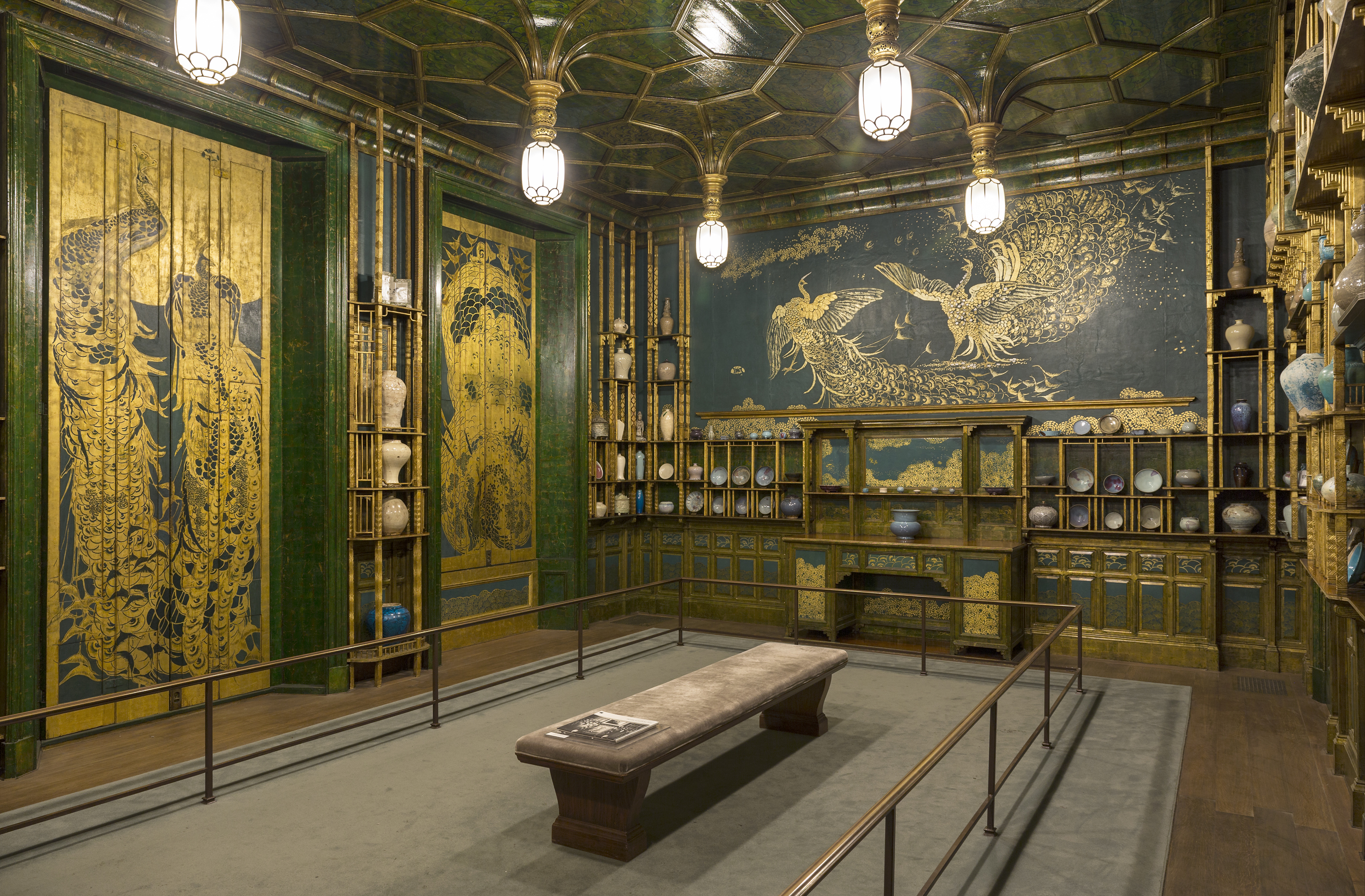
- Artists: James McNeill Whistler and Thomas Jeckyll
- Year: 1876–1877
- Type: Room installation
- Medium: Oil paint and gold leaf on canvas, leather, and wood
- Movement: Aestheticism and Japonisme
- Dimensions: 421.6 cm × 613.4 cm × 1026.2 cm (166.0 in × 241.5 in × 404.0 in)
- Location: Freer Gallery of Art, Washington, D.C.; 38°53′16.50″N 77°01′37.00″W
- Accession: F1904-61

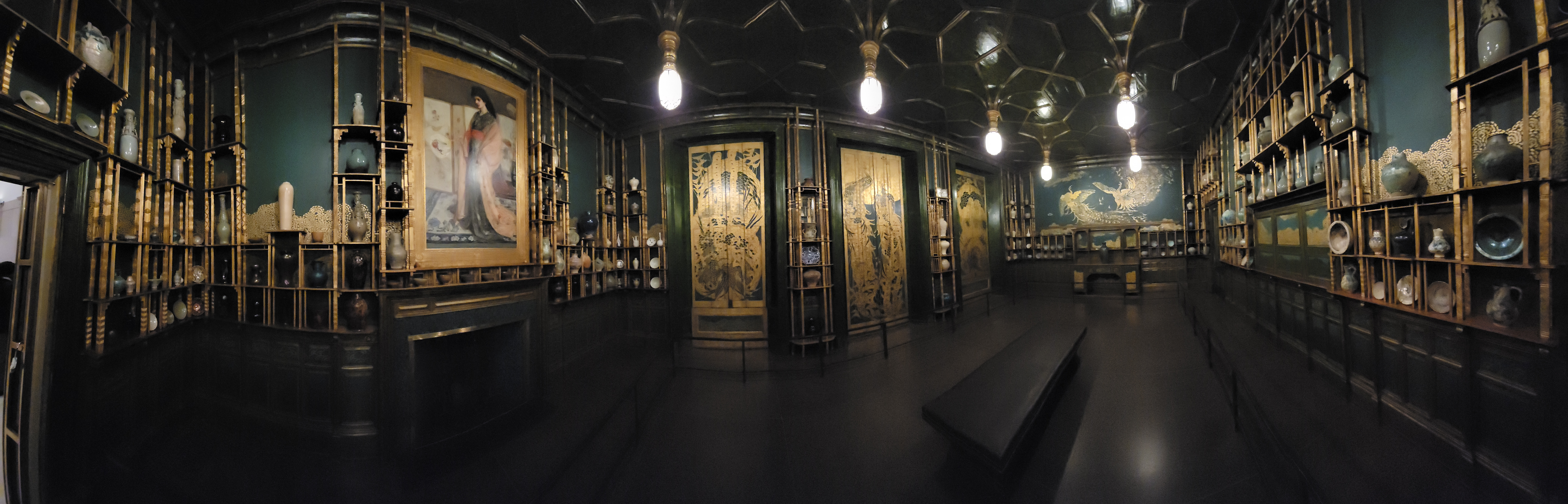
360° panorama (view as a 360° interactive panorama)

Harmony in Blue and Gold: The Peacock Room (better known as The Peacock Room) is a work of interior decorative art created by James McNeill Whistler and Thomas Jeckyll in a London house, and now moved to the Freer Gallery of Art in Washington, D.C., which is part of the Smithsonian's National Museum of Asian Art. Whistler painted the paneled room in a unified palette of blue-greens with over-glazing and metallic gold leaf. Painted between 1876 and 1877, it is now considered one of the greatest surviving Aesthetic interiors, and the best examples of the Anglo-Japanese style.

== History ==
The Peacock Room was originally designed to serve as the dining room in the townhouse located at 49 Prince's Gate in the neighbourhood of Kensington in London, owned by the British shipping magnate Frederick Richards Leyland. Leyland engaged the British architect Richard Norman Shaw to remodel and redecorate his home. Shaw entrusted the remodelling of the dining room to Thomas Jeckyll, another British architect experienced in the Anglo-Japanese style. Jeckyll conceived the dining room as a Porzellanzimmer (porcelain room).

He covered the walls with 16th-century wall hangings of cuir de Cordoue that had been originally brought to England as part of the dowry of Catherine of Aragon. They were painted with her heraldic device, the open pomegranate, and a series of red Tudor roses to symbolize her union with Henry VIII. They had hung on the walls of a Tudor-style house in Norfolk for centuries before they were bought by Leyland for £1,000. Against these walls, Jekyll constructed an intricate lattice framework of engraved spindled walnut shelves that held Leyland's collection of Chinese blue and white porcelain, mostly from the Kangxi era of the Qing dynasty.

To the south of the room, a walnut Welsh dresser was placed in the centre, just below the large empty leather panel, and flanked on both sides by the framework shelves. On the east side, three tall windows parted the room overlooking a private park, and covered by full-length walnut shutters. To the north a fireplace, over which hung the painting by American painter James McNeill Whistler, Rose and Silver: The Princess from the Land of Porcelain, served as the focal point of the room. The ceiling was constructed in a pendant panelled Tudor-style, and decorated with eight globed pendant gas light fixtures. To finish the room, Jekyll placed a rug with a red border on the floor.

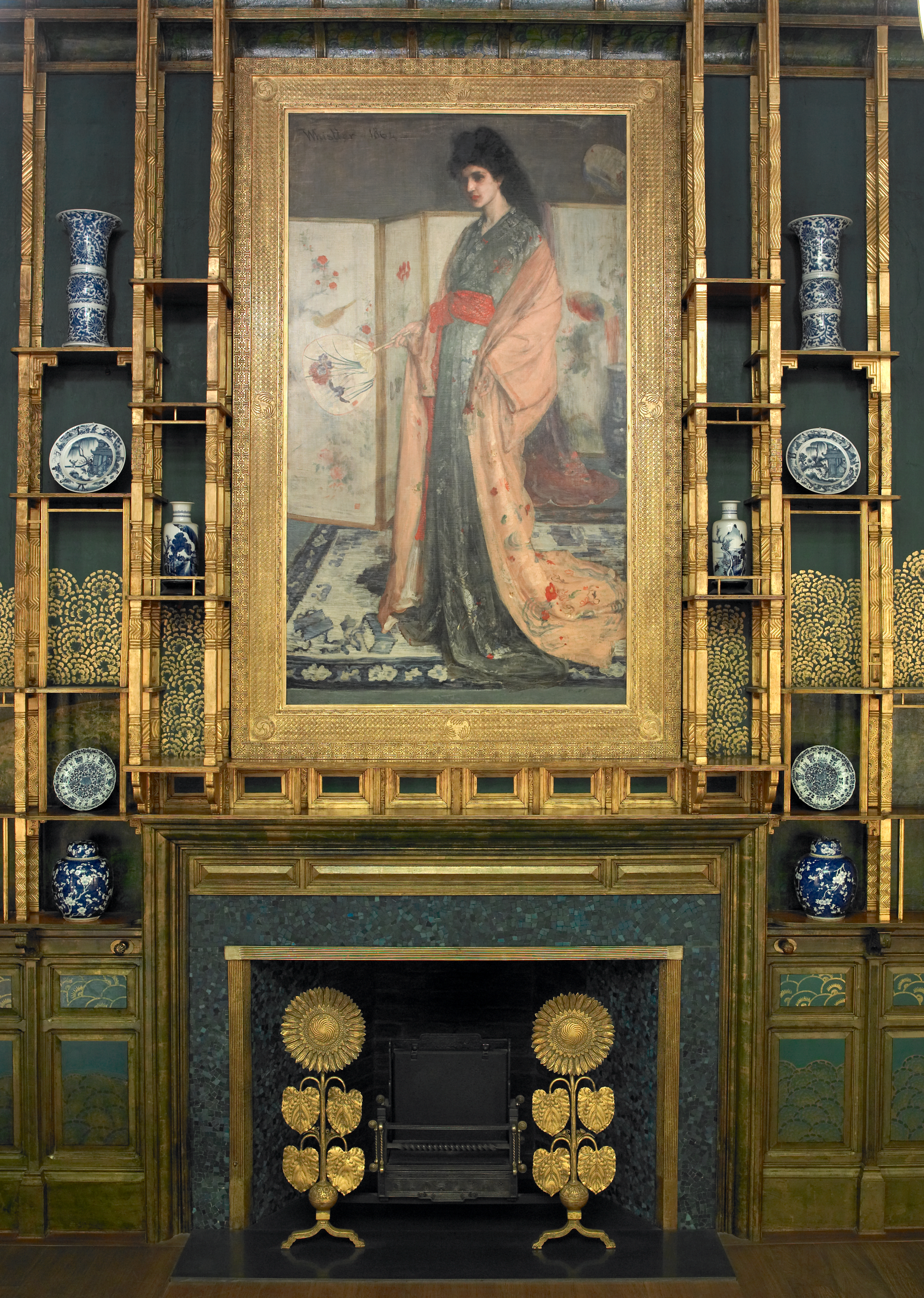
The Princess from the Land of Porcelain, in situ in the Peacock Room

Whistler was working on decorations for the entrance hall of Leyland's house when Jeckyll had nearly completed his decorative scheme. Concerned that the red roses adorning the leather wall hangings clashed with the colours in The Princess, Whistler suggested retouching the leather with yellow paint, and Leyland agreed to that minor alteration. He also authorised Whistler to embellish the cornice and wainscoting with a "wave pattern" derived from the design in Jeckyll's leaded-glass door, and then went to his home in Liverpool. During Leyland's absence, however, Whistler grew bolder with his revisions.

Well, you know, I just painted on. I went on—without design or sketch—it grew as I painted. And toward the end, I reached such a point of perfection—putting in every touch with such freedom—that when I came round to the corner where I started, why, I had to paint part of it over again, as the difference would have been too marked. And the harmony in blue and gold developing, you know, I forgot everything in my joy in it!

— James McNeill Whistler

Upon returning, Leyland was shocked by the "improvements". The artist and patron quarrelled so violently over the room and the proper compensation for the work that the relationship with Whistler was terminated. At one point, Whistler gained access to Leyland's home and painted two fighting peacocks meant to represent the artist and his patron, which he titled Art and Money: or, The Story of the Room.

Whistler is reported to have said to Leyland, "Ah, I have made you famous. My work will live when you are forgotten. Still, per chance, in the dim ages to come you will be remembered as the proprietor of the Peacock Room."

The dispute between Whistler and Leyland did not end there. In 1879, Whistler was forced to file for bankruptcy, and Leyland was his chief creditor at the time. When the creditors arrived to inventory the artist's home for liquidation, they were greeted by The Gold Scab: Eruption in Frilthy Lucre (The Creditor), a large painted caricature of Leyland portrayed as an anthropomorphic demonic peacock playing a piano, sitting upon Whistler's house, painted in the same colours featured in the Peacock Room. He referenced the incident again in his book, The Gentle Art of Making Enemies. Adding to the emotional drama was Whistler's fondness for Leyland's wife, Frances, who separated from her husband in 1879. Another result of this drama was Jeckyll whose erratic behavior at the time lead to being institutionalized, he died three years later.

Having acquired The Princess from the Land of Porcelain, American industrialist and art collector Charles Lang Freer anonymously purchased the entire room in 1904 from Leyland's heirs, including Leyland's daughter and her husband, the British artist Val Prinsep. Freer then had the contents of the Peacock Room installed in his Detroit mansion. After Freer's death in 1919, the Peacock Room was permanently installed in the Freer Gallery of Art at the Smithsonian in Washington, D.C. The gallery opened to the public in 1923.

The Peacock Room was closed for renovation, along with other parts of the gallery, in January 2016. It reopened to the public in the summer of 2017; it also underwent extensive restoration in 2022.

== Legacy ==
Filthy Lucre, an installation by contemporary artist Darren Waterston, replicates The Peacock Room in a state of decay and disrepair. It opened in May 2015.

In March 2020, Church Life, a journal of the University of Notre Dame's McGrath Institute, published "The Art of Madness and Mystery," an essay which uses The Peacock Room and Waterson's Filthy Lucre to examine at length the differences and inherent character of traditional art (especially in the context of Aestheticism) and Contemporary Art.

== See also ==
- List of paintings by James McNeill Whistler
- David B. Gamble House
