= Kangxi (disambiguation) =

Kangxi may refer to:

- Kangxi Emperor (1654-1722), third emperor of the Chinese Qing Dynasty
- Kangxi Dictionary, authoritative compilation and cross reference of Chinese characters, first published during the emperor's reign and used to the present day
- Kangxi radicals, 214 modern Chinese radicals, as organized in the Kangxi dictionary
- Kangxi Dynasty, a Chinese drama TV series
- Kangxi lai le, a talk show in Taiwan
- Kangxi transitional porcelain

== See also ==
- Choi Kang-hee (footballer)
- Lee Kang-hee
