= Tianqi porcelain =

Type of Chinese porcelain

The bottom side of a teapot

Tianqi porcelain or ko sometsuke (古染付け) refers to Chinese underglaze blue porcelain made in the unofficial kilns of Jingdezhen for a largely Japanese market in the 17th century. The term Tianqi (天啓; Tenkei in Japanese) is a reference to the era name of the reign of the Tianqi Emperor (r. 1621–1628) during the late Ming dynasty, but the style and the name are not limited to his reign. Over the same period the related transitional porcelain was being made.

Generally speaking, Tianqi porcelain was one variety of porcelain among various styles of the Jingdezhen unofficial kilns from the time of production breakdown of the official kilns at the death of the Wanli Emperor in 1620 to a time of reorganization in 1683 during the reign of the Kangxi Emperor during the Qing dynasty. The Tianqi ware, and other associated wares, display a refreshing spontaneity of design that makes them unique in Chinese ceramic history. The influence of the master landscape artist Dong Qichang (1555–1636) can be discerned in the use of a dark and light color contrast.

Designs for this ware are usually landscapes, birds and flowers, animals, and human figures. Sizes are usually small to mid-size flatware and bowls. Many examples of the ware were treasured in Japan as part of the tea ceremony culture. Many examples of this ware show an unmistakable Japanese influence and it is thought that they were especially ordered from Japan by period tea masters. This ware is also known in Japan as ko sometsuke (古染付け) or "old blue-and white". Base inscriptions are usually those from previous reigns in the dynasty with a preference for the Chenghua reign mark.
