= Elsing Hall =

Moated manor house in Elsing, UK

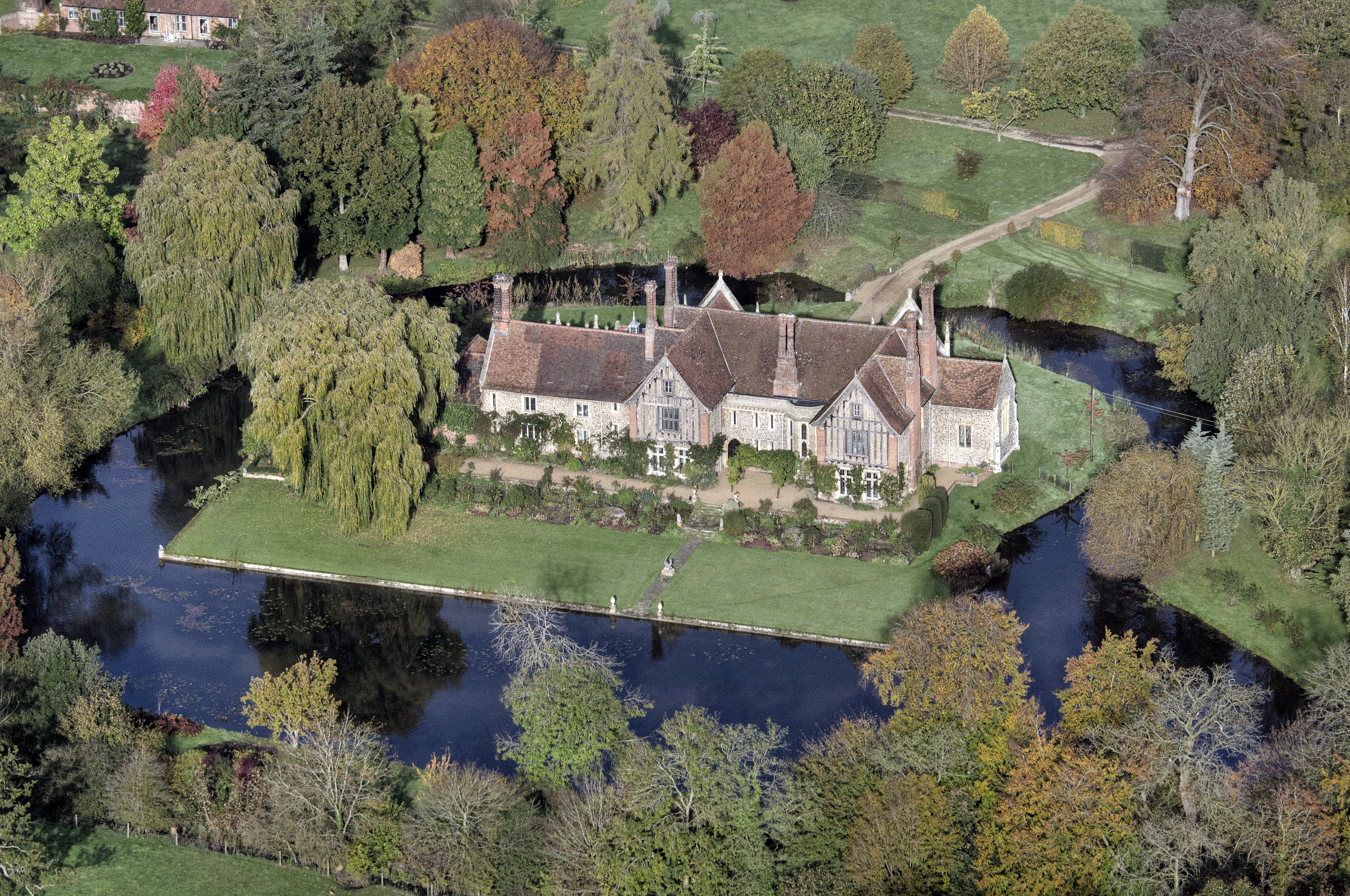
- Interactive map of the Elsing Hall area

General information
- Location: Elsing, Norfolk, United Kingdom
- Coordinates: 52.7033°N 1.01793°E
- Construction started: 13th century

Elsing Hall is a Grade I listed moated manor house in Elsing, Norfolk, England. Likely first built in the 13th century and home to Hugh Hastings I, it was extensively remodelled around 1852 by Thomas Jeckyll.

== History ==
Work at the site likely began in the 13th century. It was the home of Sir Hugh Hastings I, who was later buried in St Mary's Church, Elsing which he had built with his wife Margery Foliot, the heiress of the Elsing Hall site. The oldest work now visible on the site is from the mid to late 15th century, when a gatehouse and bastions were built; these survive around the edge of the moated island.

In 1540 the site passed by marriage to the Browne family which held it until the mid-20th century. In the early 19th century, James Bulwer painted the house in watercolour; this work shows the original form of the house prior to its 1852 refurbishment.

90% of the hall's visible structure is likely from architect Thomas Jeckyll's work at the site around 1852. The house generally kept its medieval form despite the extensive refurbishments; Jekyll sought to reinstate the house's character with additional Tudorbethan style. These alterations included the enlargement of the moat's south side to form a lake, a new exterior hall built in flint, and rebuilt chimney stacks with ornamental bricks.

The site first became a listed building on 4 December 1951. In 1989 the family of David Cargill, a national board member for the Arts Council for England, began to develop the grounds over 30 years, creating a garden with an arboretum.
