= Thomas Jeckyll =

English architect and designer

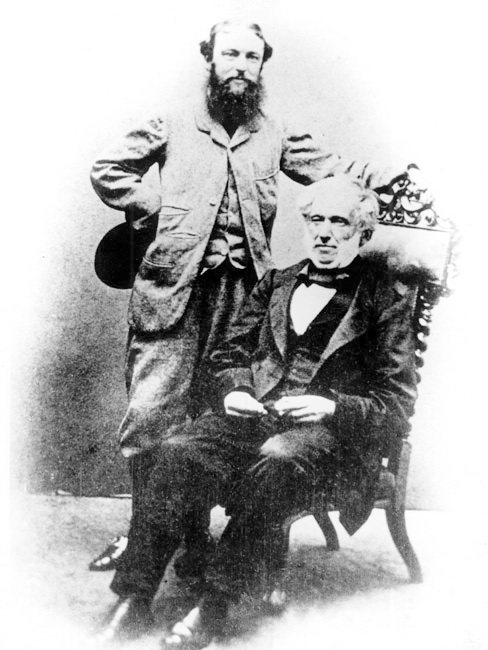
- Thomas Jeckyll and his father
- Born: 20 June 1827; Norfolk, United Kingdom of Great Britain and Ireland
- Died: 1 January 1881 (aged 53)
- Occupations: Architect, Anglo-Japanese style Designer

Thomas Jeckyll (1827 Wymondham, Norfolk – 1881 Norwich) (baptised on 20 June 1827) was an English architect who excelled in the creation of metalwork and furniture strongly influenced by Japanese design, and is best known for his planning in 1876 of the ‘Peacock Room’ at 49 Princes Gate, London.

== Biography ==
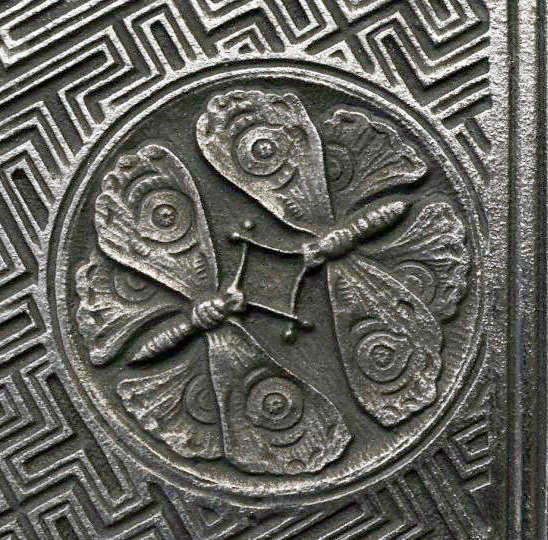
Signature medallion used by Thomas Jeckyll

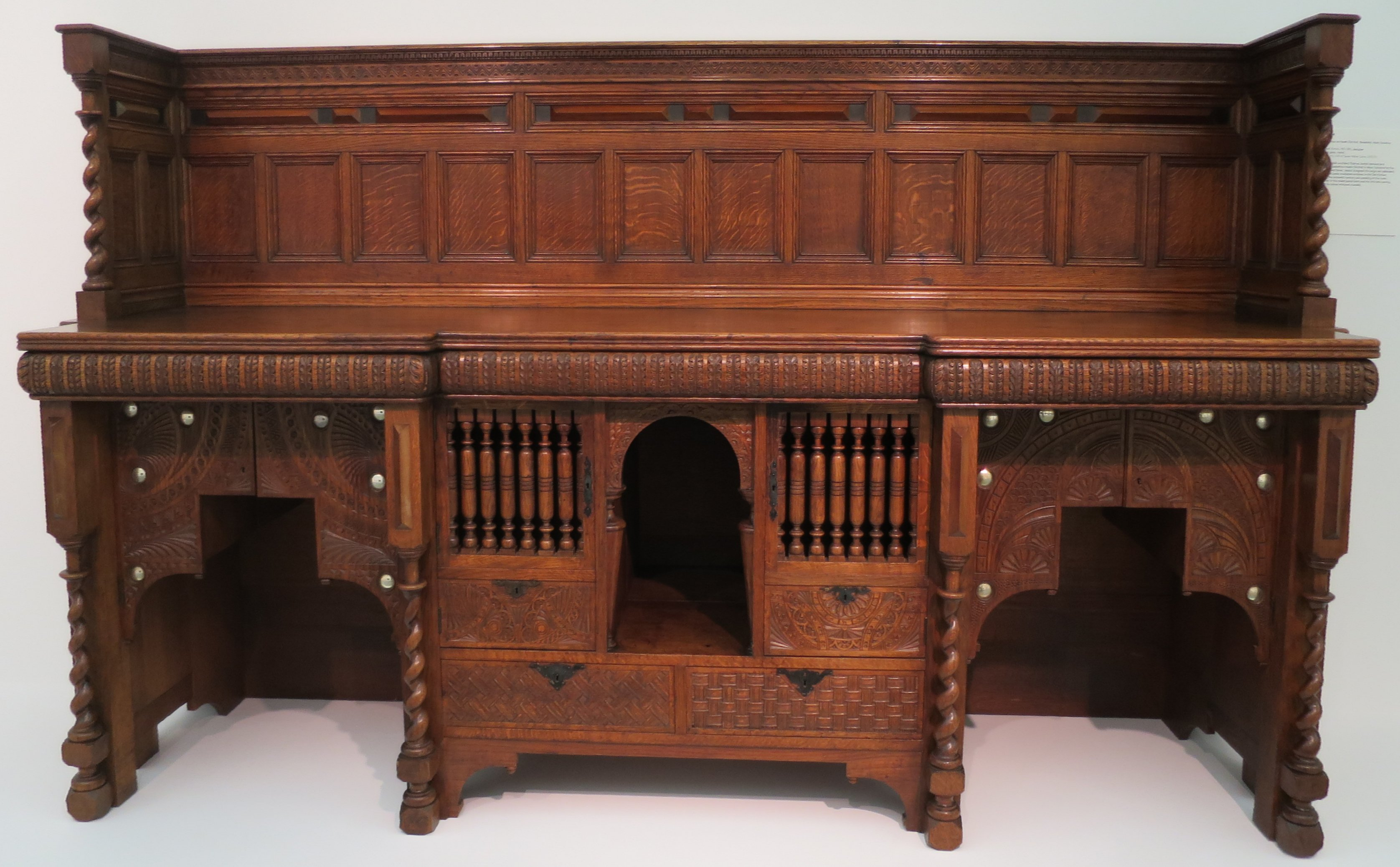
Sideboard designed for the Oak Parlour at Heath Old Hall

Thomas Jeckyll was a son of George Jeckell, a Nonconformist clerk who had taken holy orders, was curate of the Abbey Church in Wymondham and was married to Maria Ann Balduck. Thomas later changed his surname to 'Jeckyll.' His brother Henry was a brass founder in Dudley. He became ill in 1877 and later died at St Andrew's Hospital, Norwich.

== Career ==
He is regarded as an important figure in the Aesthetic Movement. The Tate states "the Arts and Crafts movement ... was a key direct influence on the Aesthetic Movement and Art Nouveau", the V&A sees the Aesthetic Movement as having "sparked a revolution in the architecture and interior decoration of houses that led to a widespread recognition of the need for beauty in everyday life". His ecclesiastical architecture was often controversial, for example the remarkable polychrome pointed Methodist Church in Holt, Norfolk (1862–3), and the plain Great Hautbois Holy Trinity Church (1864), both in Norfolk. Between the 1850s and 1870s he extensively rebuilt the medieval church at Brome, Suffolk including adding a North transept and a rose window in Eastern end of the North aisle.

Jeckyll started his career as a Gothic Revival architect in 1850 in Wymondham, planning rectories and schools, designing and restoring historic homes, such as Elsing Hall near Dereham, Gothic Revival churches, such as at Sculthorpe, and constructing and improving farmhouses and agricultural buildings. By 1858 he was working in Norwich and was elected a Fellow of the Royal Institute of British Architects. Shortly thereafter he settled in London, his friend Frederick Sandys introducing him to the so-called Chelsea aesthetes, du Maurier, Swinburne, Rossetti, Burne-Jones, William Eden Nesfield, Edward William Godwin and Whistler, causing a change of direction in his artistic vision.

Jeckyll pioneered the use of Anglo-Japanese style furnishings. In 1859 he started associating with the Norwich ironworks firm of Barnard, Bishop & Barnards, a relationship which endured until 1881.

One of his first projects was the design of the Norwich Gates, which were displayed at the 1862 International Exhibition. These were then presented by the people of Norwich and Norfolk as a wedding present to the Prince of Wales, later King Edward VII, and may still be seen at the Sandringham Estate. Jeckyll produced an enormous number of designs for the front panels of Barnard's very popular range of slow combustion fireplaces. These featured a deep grate, and allowed air through the front rather than below, reducing the inflow of air and consequently burning more slowly. Jeckyll started decorating these with designs inspired by Japanese art in 1873.

In the 1870s he designed interiors for clients such as Alexander Constantine Ionides and the 'Peacock Room' for Frederick Richards Leyland. Jeckyll's behaviour had become quite erratic, and in his absence Whistler took over the decorating. Whistler painted over Jeckyll's leather-covered walls, shelving and sideboard. “While the result was undoubtedly splendid it effectively overwrote Jeckyll's contribution to art history.” Whistler described Jeckyll in 1877 as “one of my intimate comrades”.

His early death at fifty-four was brought about by a mental breakdown and severe depression. He became ill in 1877 and died in a Norwich asylum in 1881.

== Reception ==
An exhibition of his life's work was held by the Bard Graduate Center, New York in 2003. The exhibitoion was titled Thomas Jeckyll, Architect and Designer, July 17 – October 19, 2003

== List of Works ==
- Church of the Holy Trinity, Coltishall, Norfolk
- Elsing Hall, Elsing, Norfolk (Restoration, 1850s)
- St. Andrew's Church, Little Massingham, Norfolk
- The Parish Church of St Peter Horningsea near Cambridge..(partial restoration 1865 - 66).
