= Frederick Richards Leyland =

British shipowner and art collector (1831–1892)

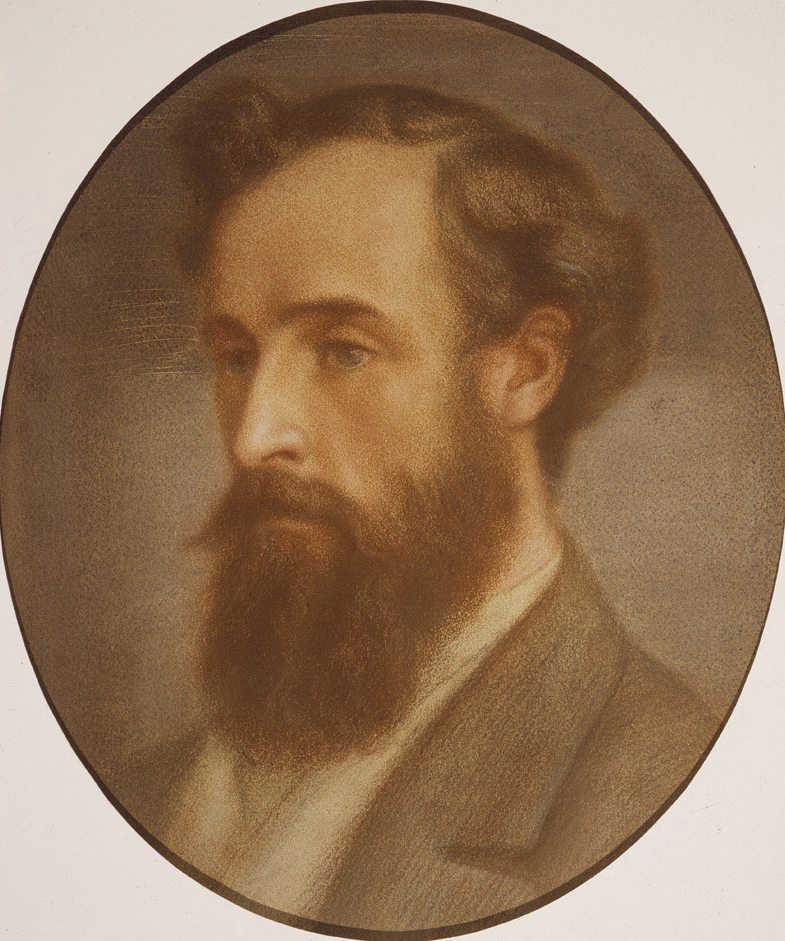
- Head of Frederick Leyland (1879), by Dante Gabriel Rossetti
- Born: 30 September 1831
- Died: 4 January 1892 (aged 60)
- Burial place: Brompton Cemetery; 51°29′5″N 0°11′26″W
- Occupation: Shipowner
- Known for: Shipowner and art collector

Frederick Richards Leyland (30 September 1831 – 4 January 1892) was one of the largest British shipowners, running 25 steamships in the transatlantic trade. He was also a major art collector, who commissioned works from several of the Pre-Raphaelite Brotherhood painters.

== Career ==
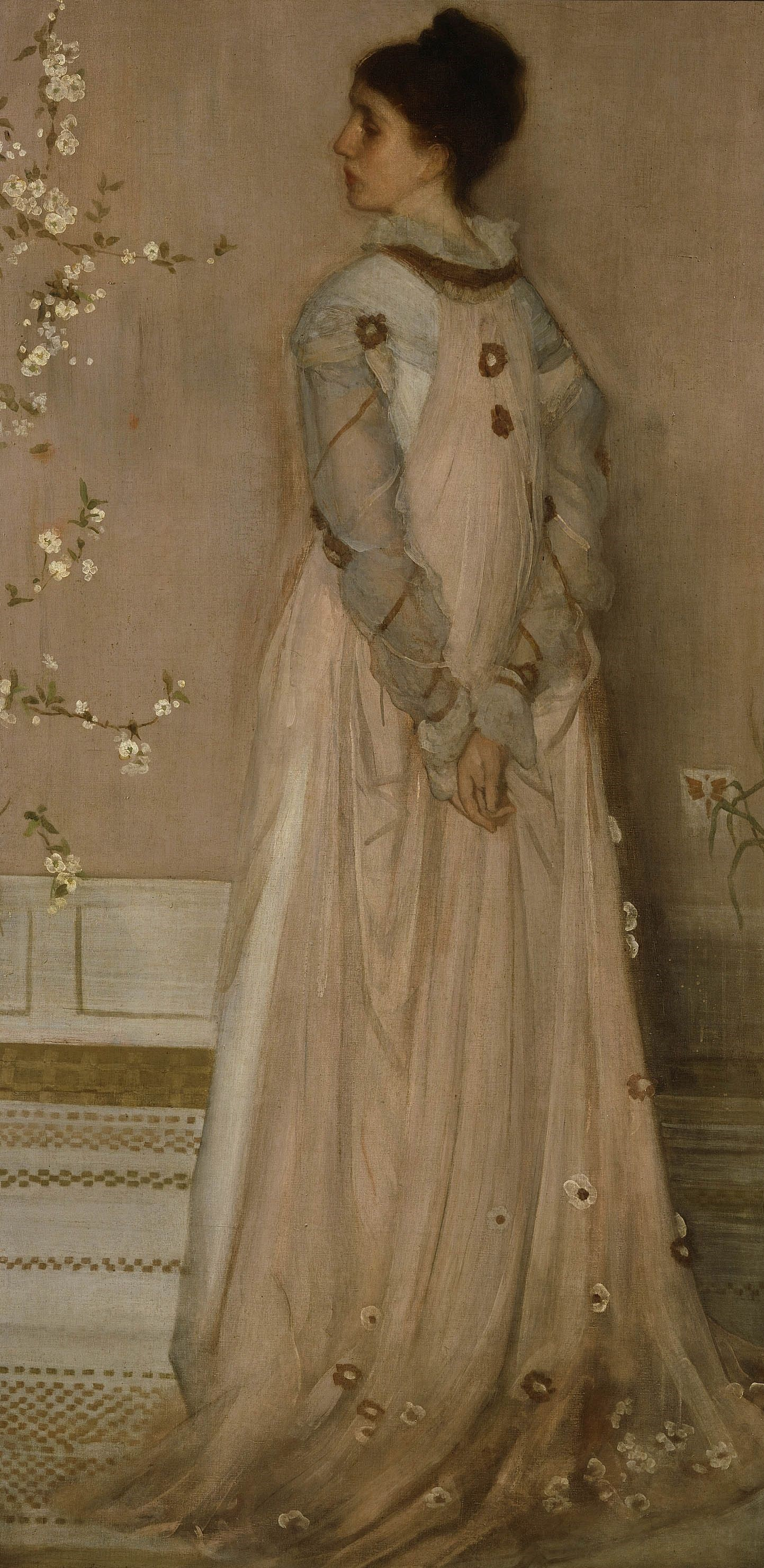
Symphony in Flesh Colour and Pink: Portrait of Frances Leyland, 1871–1874, by James McNeill Whistler

Leyland served as an apprentice in the firm of John Bibby, Sons & Co, where he rose to become a partner. In 1867, he took on the tenancy of Speke Hall, Liverpool, and in 1869 bought a house in London at 49 Princes Gate. At the end of 1872, when the Bibby partnership dissolved, he bought out his employers and changed the company name to the Leyland Line in 1873. Under his direction the line expanded into transatlantic trade and by 1882 had 25 steamships. He retired from active business in 1888, leaving his son Frederick Dawson Leyland in charge.

== Art patron ==
Leyland's first commissions were to Dante Gabriel Rossetti and James Abbott McNeill Whistler, dating from 1864 and 1867. Leyland collected Renaissance art, as well as that of the Pre-Raphaelites, Whistler and Albert Moore.

Leyland commissioned The Beguiling of Merlin, a painting by the Pre-Raphaelite painter Edward Burne-Jones, which was created between 1872 and 1877. The painting depicts a scene from Arthurian legend, the infatuation of Merlin with the Lady of the Lake, Nimue. Merlin is shown trapped, helpless in a hawthorn bush as Nimue reads from a book of spells.

In the 1870s, Leyland commissioned Whistler and architect Thomas Jeckyll to decorate his dining room. The resulting Peacock Room is considered one of Whistler's greatest works. After Leyland's death, his widow sold The Peacock Room to the American industrialist and art collector Charles Lang Freer who had it dismantled and shipped to the United States. It is now in the Smithsonian Museum's Freer Gallery of Art in Washington, DC.

== Later life ==
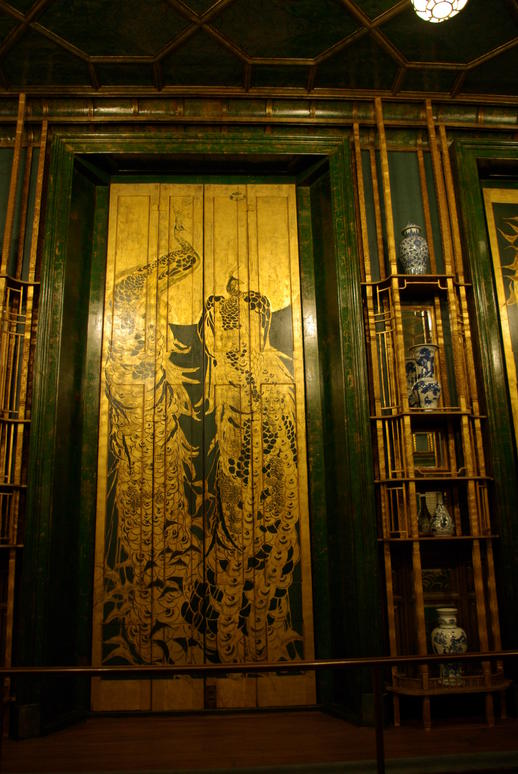
The Peacock Room by James McNeill Whistler and Thomas Jeckyll

Leyland died in 1892, one of the largest shipowners in Britain, and is buried in Brompton Cemetery, London. The grave is 10m west of the main path between the north entrance and colonnade but is highly recognisable due to its unique form and design.

== Legacy ==
In 1892, John Ellerman made his first move into shipping by leading a consortium which purchased the Leyland Line of the late Frederick Richards Leyland. In 1901, Ellerman sold this business to J.P. Morgan for £1.2 million, which was immediately folded into the International Mercantile Marine Co.

Leyland's funerary monument is the only such work by Edward Burne-Jones – the finest Arts and Crafts funerary monument in the UK, and Grade II* listed.

== Personal life ==
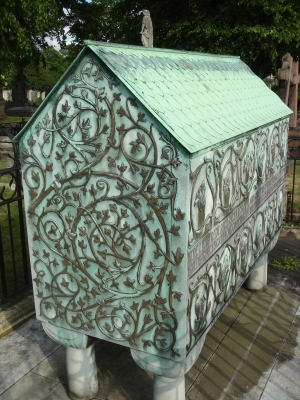
Edward Burne-Jones designed Leyland's funerary monument, located in Brompton Cemetery

Leyland married Frances née Dawson (1834–1910) on 23 March 1855, but they separated in 1879, possibly because of his liaison with his married mistress Rosa Laura Caldecott, née Gately (d. 1890).

He and Frances had four children together: Frederick Dawson (b. 1856), Fanny (b. 1857), Florence (b. 1859, married Valentine Cameron Prinsep), and Elinor (1861–1952).

Rosa bore a son named Frederick Richards Leyland Caldecott in 1883. Leyland had two further sons with his mistress Annie Ellen Wooster, Frederick Richards (b.1884) and Francis George Leyland Wooster (b.1890).
