= Transitional porcelain =

Type of Chinese ceramic

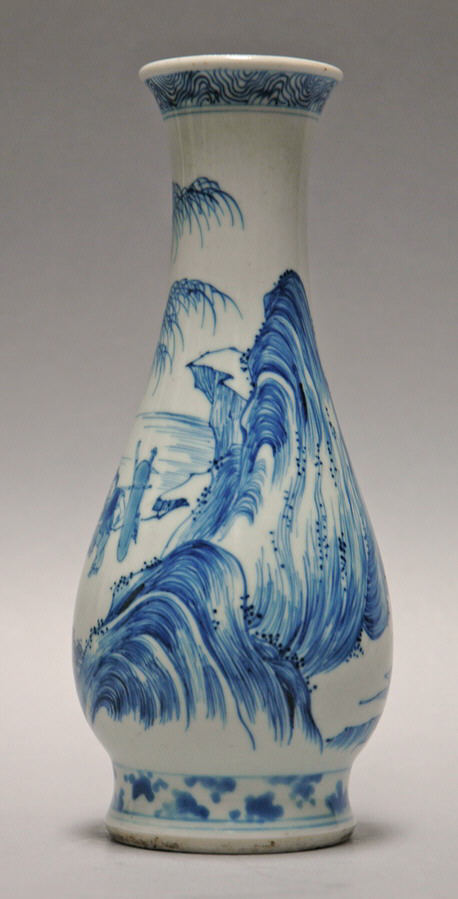
Vase with landscape, mid-century

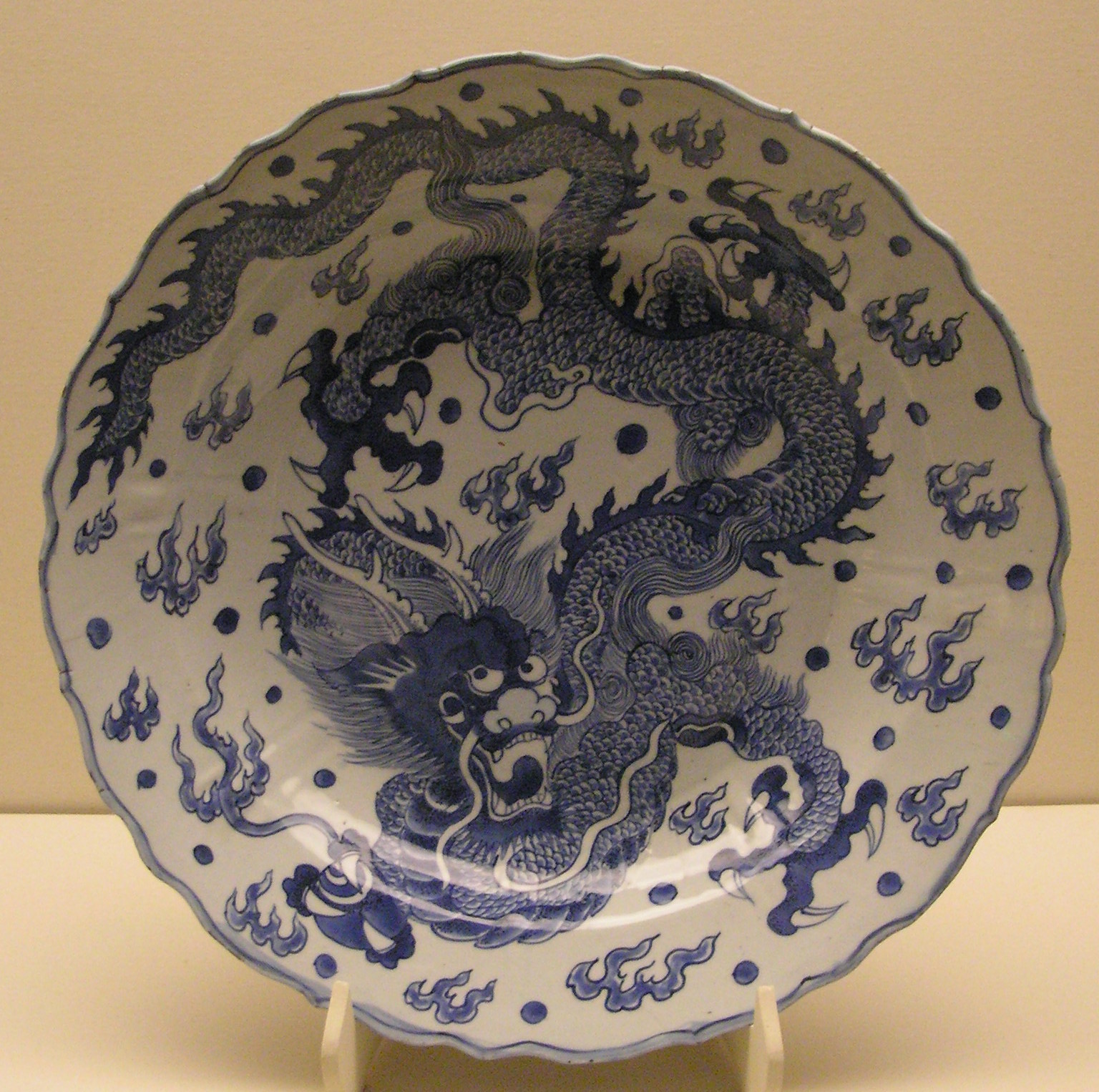
Dragon dish, Late Ming, c. 1640

Transitional porcelain is Jingdezhen porcelain, manufactured at China's principle ceramic production area, in the years during and after the transition from Ming to Qing. As with several previous changes of dynasty in China, this was a protracted and painful period of civil war. Though the start date of Qing rule is customarily given as 1644, when the last Ming emperor hanged himself as the capital fell, the war had really begun in 1618 and Ming resistance continued until 1683. During this period, the Ming system of large-scale manufacturing in the imperial porcelain factories, with orders and payments coming mainly from the imperial court, finally collapsed, and the officials in charge had to turn themselves from obedient civil servants into businessmen, seeking private customers, including foreign trading companies from Europe, Japanese merchants, and new domestic customers.

These new customers led to major changes in the style of porcelain, most of it painted in underglaze cobalt blue on white. A much more free approach was taken to painting, influenced by other Chinese genres of painting. Woodblock illustrations to books were often used as sources for images, or their style copied. An exhibition of porcelain from the period was called "The Liberated Brush".

This situation lasted from 1620 to 1683, when the new Qing dynasty, after some decades struggling with Ming forces, finally resumed large-scale use of Jingdezhen for official wares under the Kangxi Emperor (r. 1662–1722). The larger kilns and a major part of the town were destroyed in 1674 by Ming forces after the Revolt of the Three Feudatories had become a civil war. From 1680 to 1688 the reconstruction of the industry was under the control of Zang Yingxuan from the Qing Board of Works. Organised production of court porcelain had resumed by 1683, and the institution of forced labour replaced by waged employment. Succeeding controllers were appointed by the provincial administration up until 1726, when Beijing appointed Nian Xiyao.

== History ==
The start of the period is conventionally taken as being 1620, under the late Ming dynasty, with the death of the Wanli Emperor (1573–1620), although the most characteristic style probably began from about 1628. During the Wanli reign ceramics under government sponsorship slowly degenerated in quality until production itself was abandoned. The Manchu Qing dynasty regime took the capital in 1644. For those many intervening years, and for years after, a variety of porcelain wares were created in private kilns for domestic use and export to client markets such as Japan. Prior to the reinstatement of the imperial kilns at Jingdezhen the private use of the dynastic reign name on ceramics was officially forbidden in the 16th year of the reign of the Kangxi Emperor in the Qing dynasty (around 1677).

== Style ==
The term "transitional" is usually and most correctly used for one characteristic style made in the period 1620–1683, and arguably for some time afterwards. Other styles of porcelain continued to be made, including rather uninspired continuations of Ming styles. The true transitional style is finely potted and painted, with a deep blue compared to "violets in milk". Many pieces have groups of figures in an extravagant landscape with mountains, clouds, and the moon. Although very much in the "Chinese taste", the pieces also appealed to buyers from Japan and Europe, and many were immediately exported. Other types of wares were made in the Japanese taste, such as the shonsui wares and the ko sometsuke (古染付け) or "old blue-and white" (the same term is used for Japanese-made versions of the style). The term Tianqi porcelain is mostly used of these types for the Japanese market, from the Tianqi Emperor (r. 1620–1627).

The transitional ware of the early Kangxi decades witnessed a move away from designs and aesthetic standards of the painter Dong Qichang to newer tastes typified by the artist Shen Shitong and his use of western perspective. The influence of the artist Dong Qichang can be readily seen on ceramic ware of the period with its heavily accented light and dark tones. The change to Shen Shitung can be seen in generous vertical washes that create a definite foreground and background contrast. The informality of design and shape appealed to Japanese taste and especially those involved in the tea ceremony.

Palace-ware or imperial-ware has traditionally found many admirers in Europe and America. Kangxi reign marks on porcelain are few throughout the ceramic period, but a few can be identified with the pre‑1677 decades. Earlier Ming period marks can frequently be found. Their styles closely match the few Kangxi marks that are found and aid in delineating Kangxi transitional porcelain.

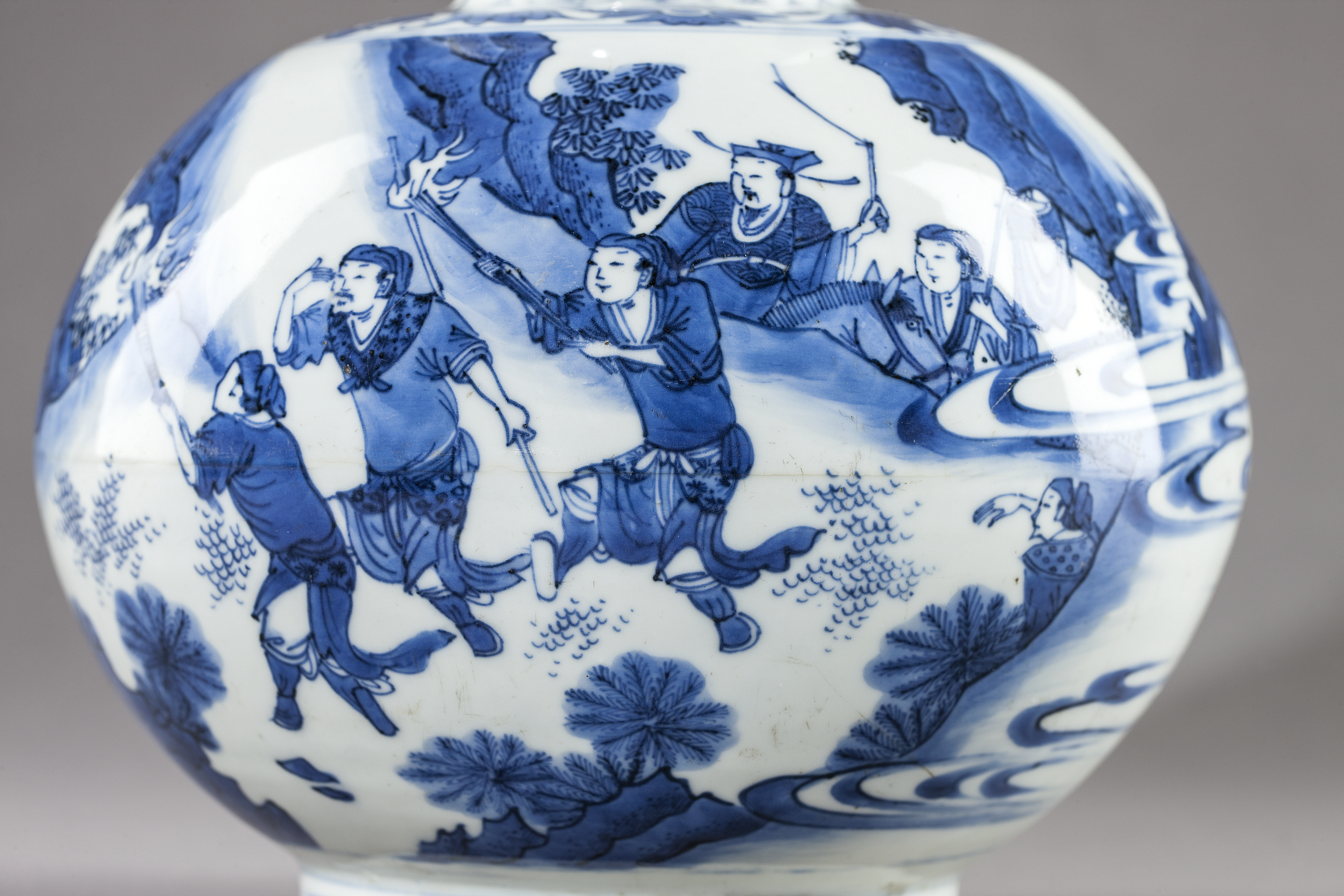
Detail of late Ming vase, 1627–1644, with battle scene from literature. Despite the Chinese subject, the vase was exported to Europe.

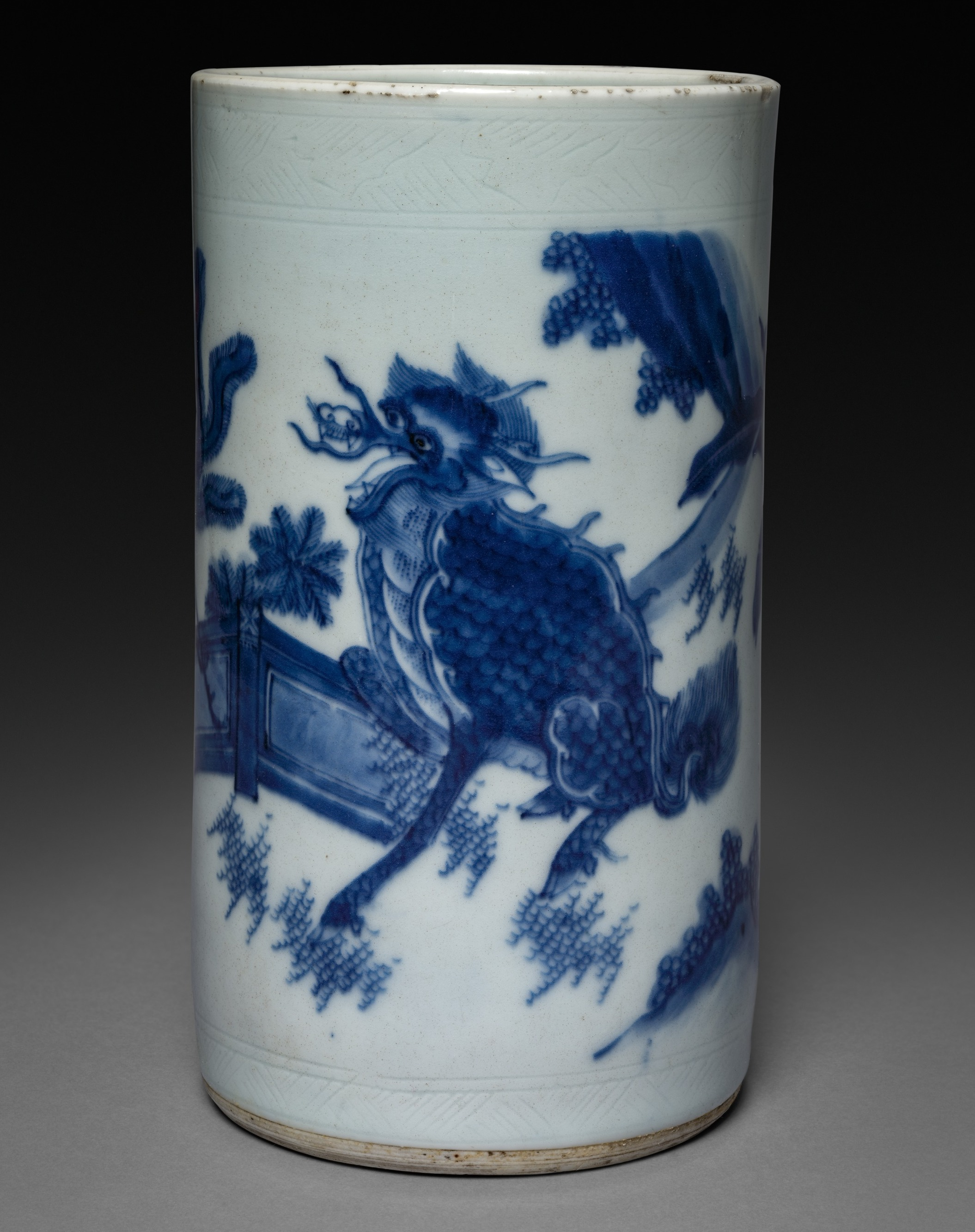
Brush Holder, Jingdezhen, 1628

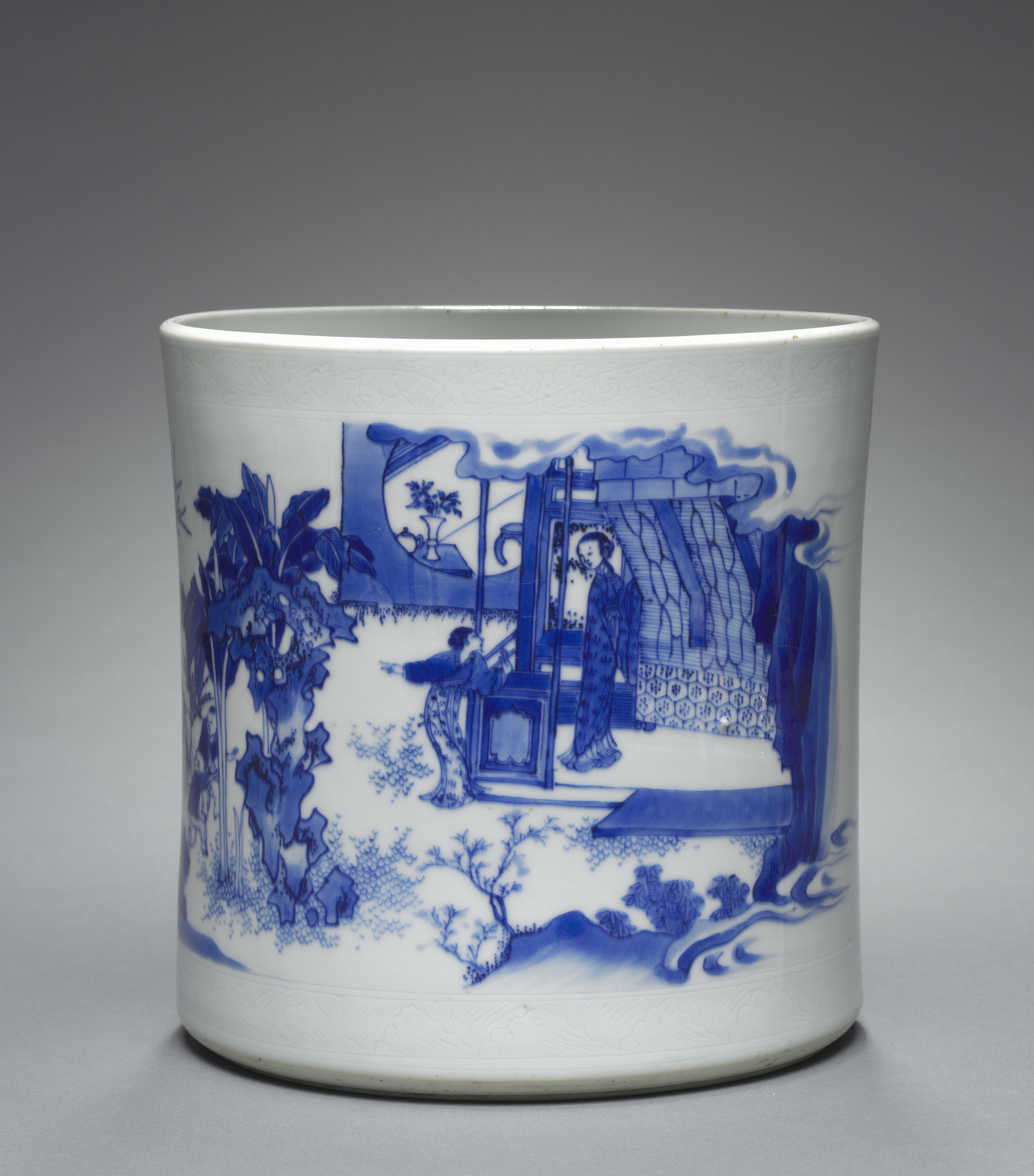
Brush pot with episode from the story of Sima Guang

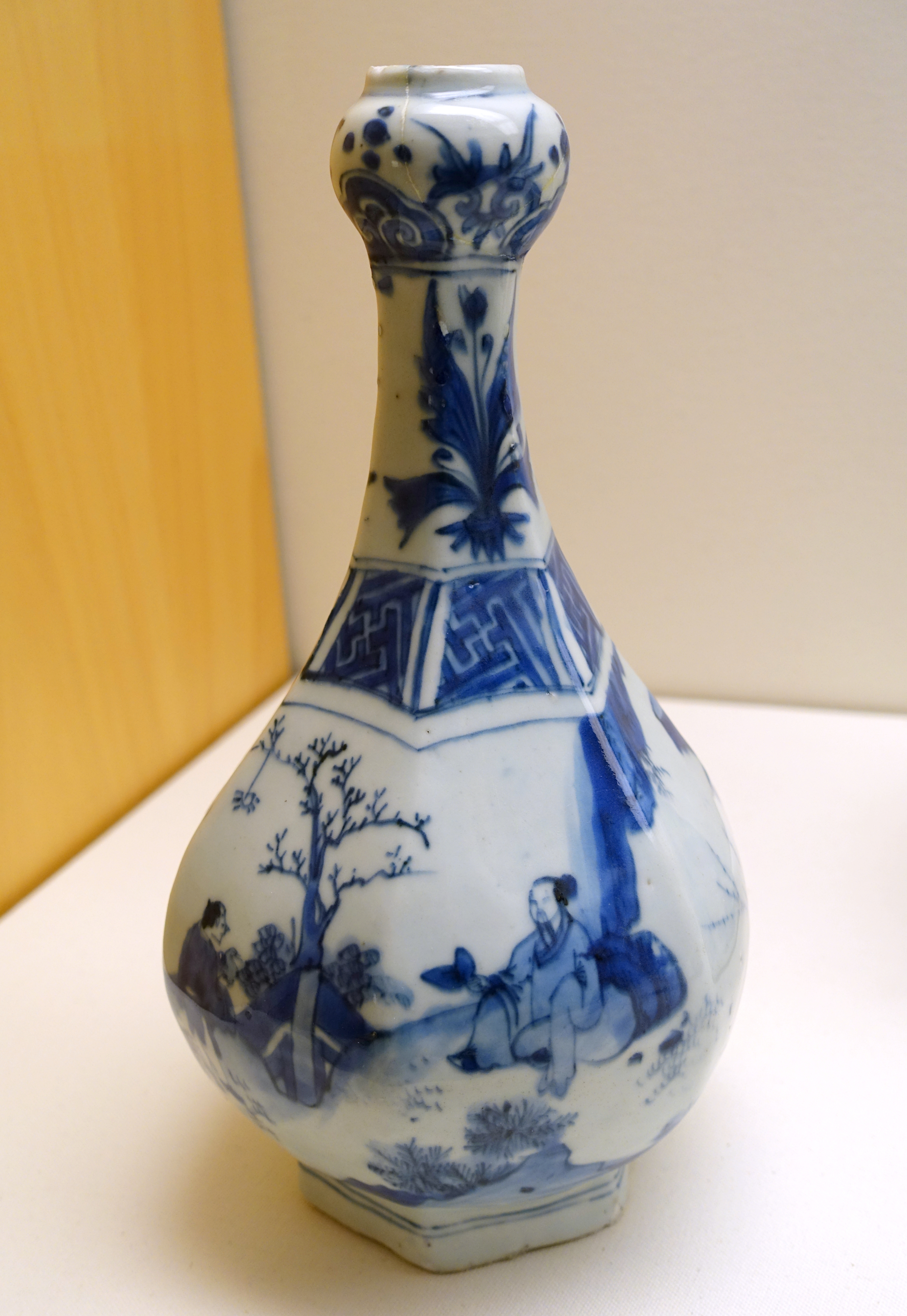
Hexagonal garlic-headed vase

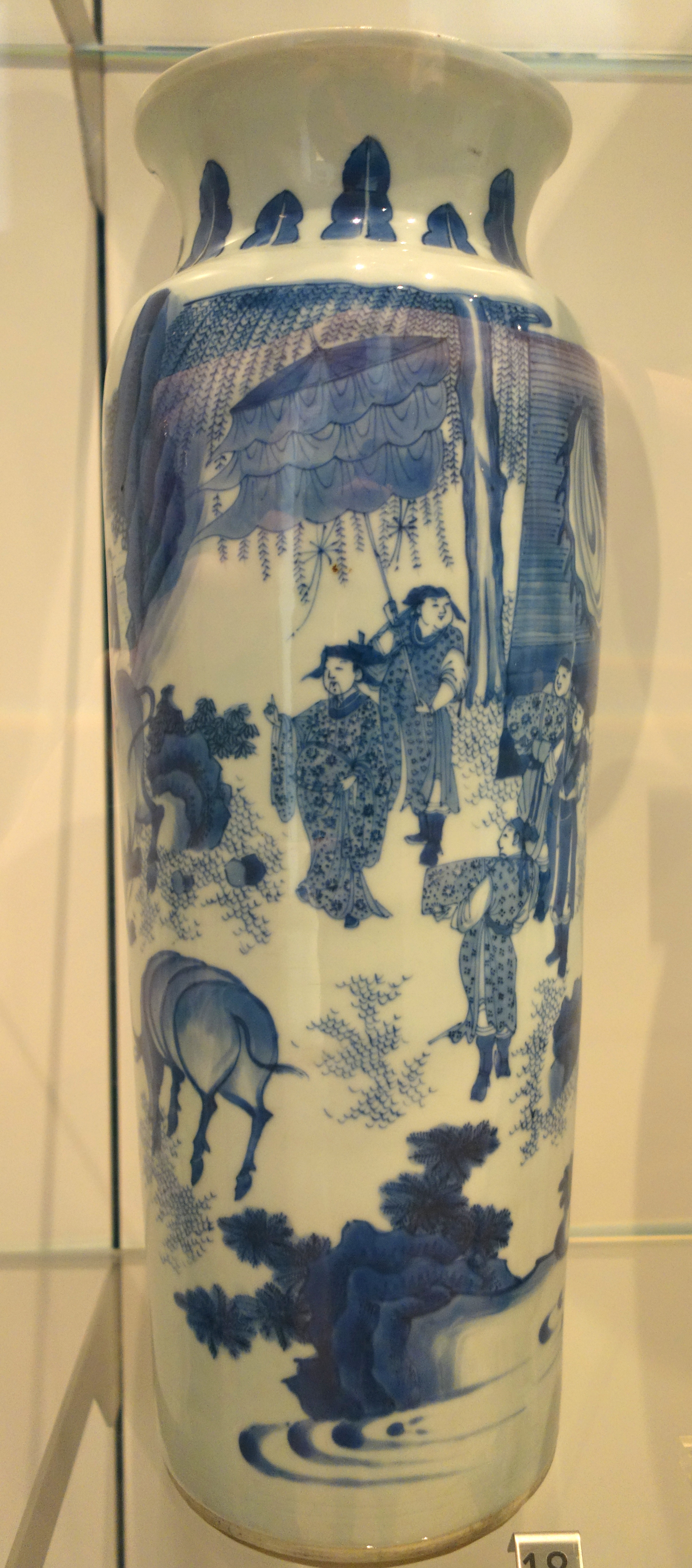
Jingdezhen vase, c. 1625–1644

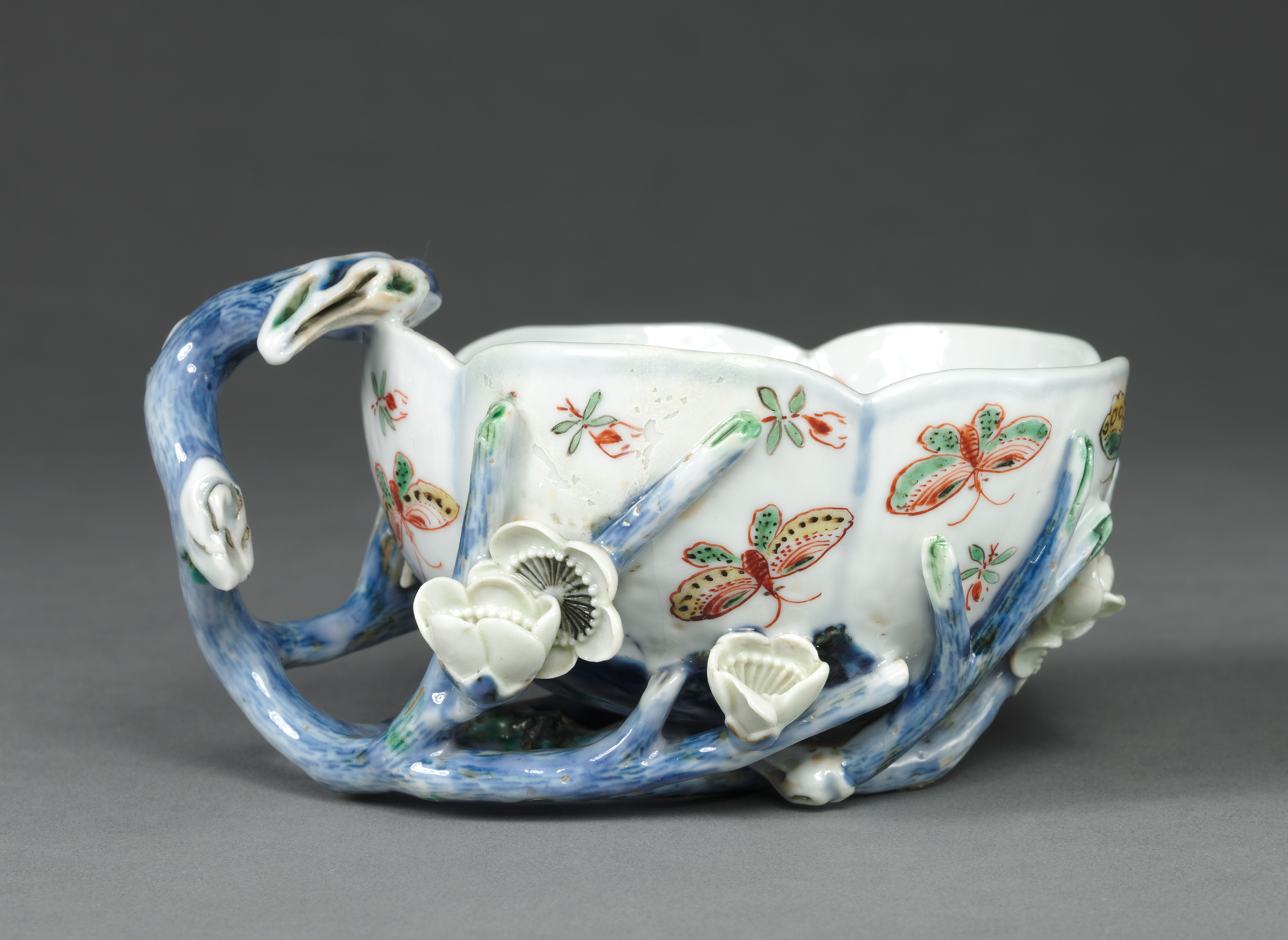
Jingdezhen, Plum Blossom Cup

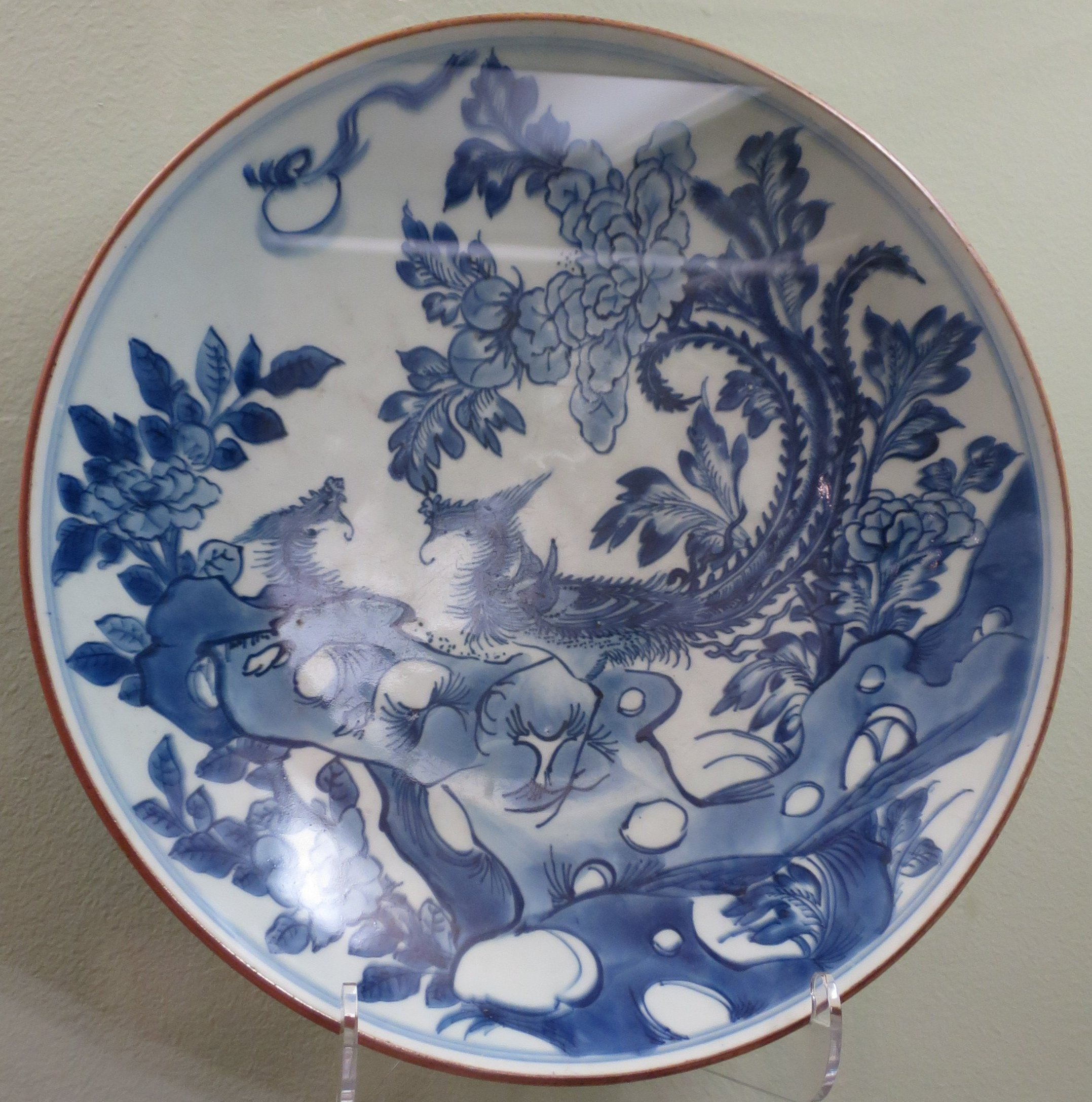
Charger, 1644–1661

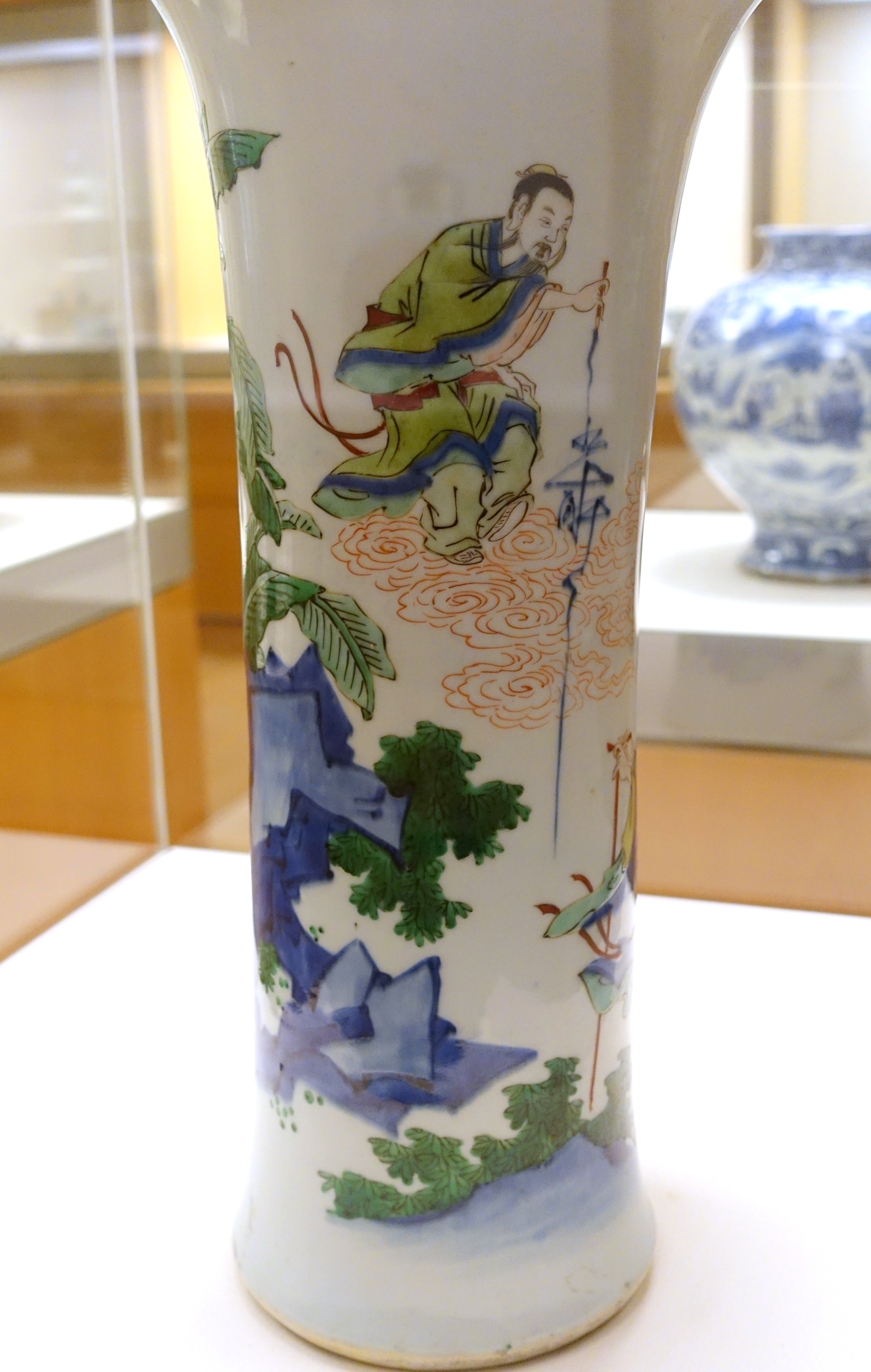
Early Qing vase, c. 1650 AD, wucai technique

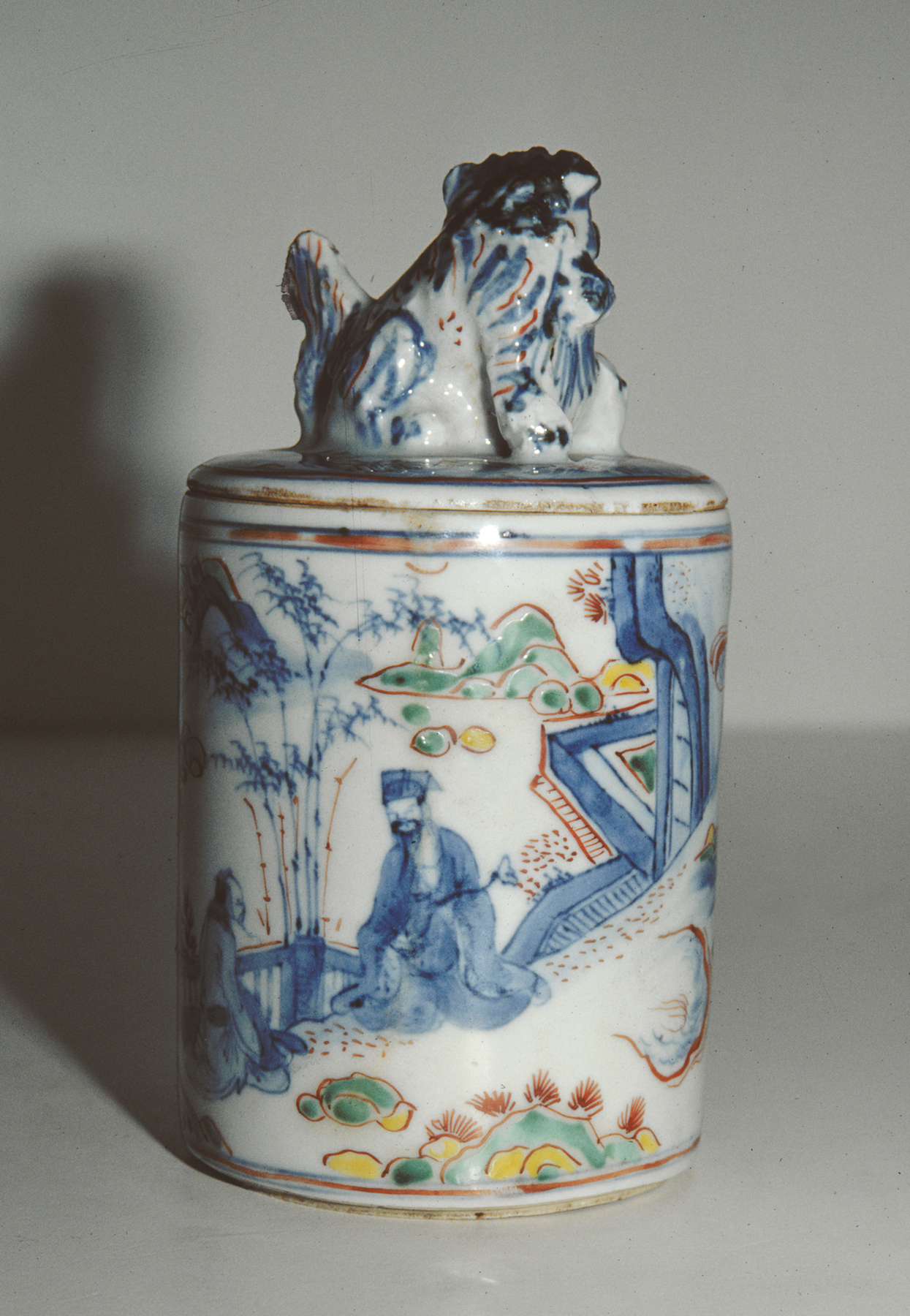
Covered jar, 1620–1640, probably for the Japanese market

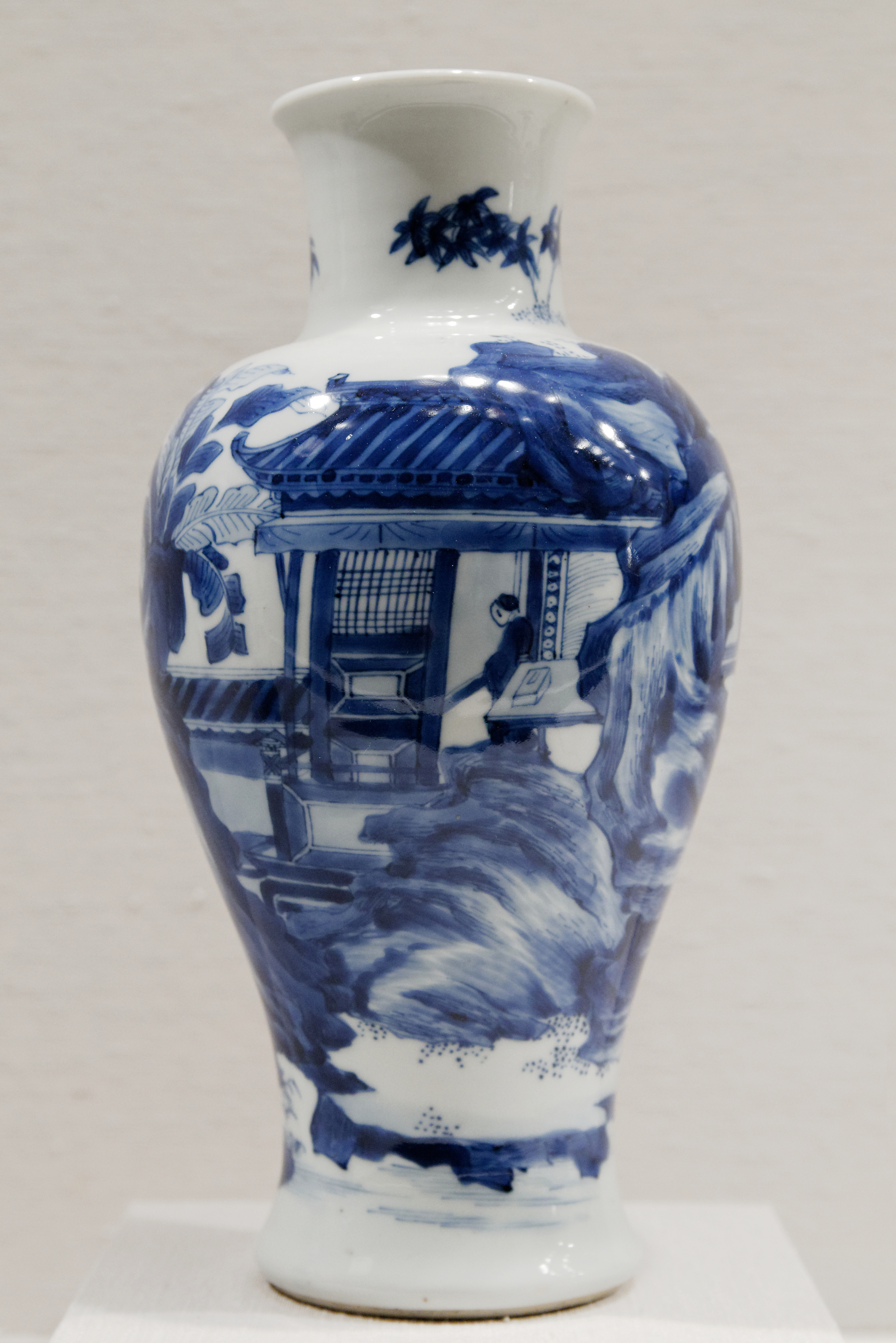
Kangxi vase, about 1700, showing the style living on

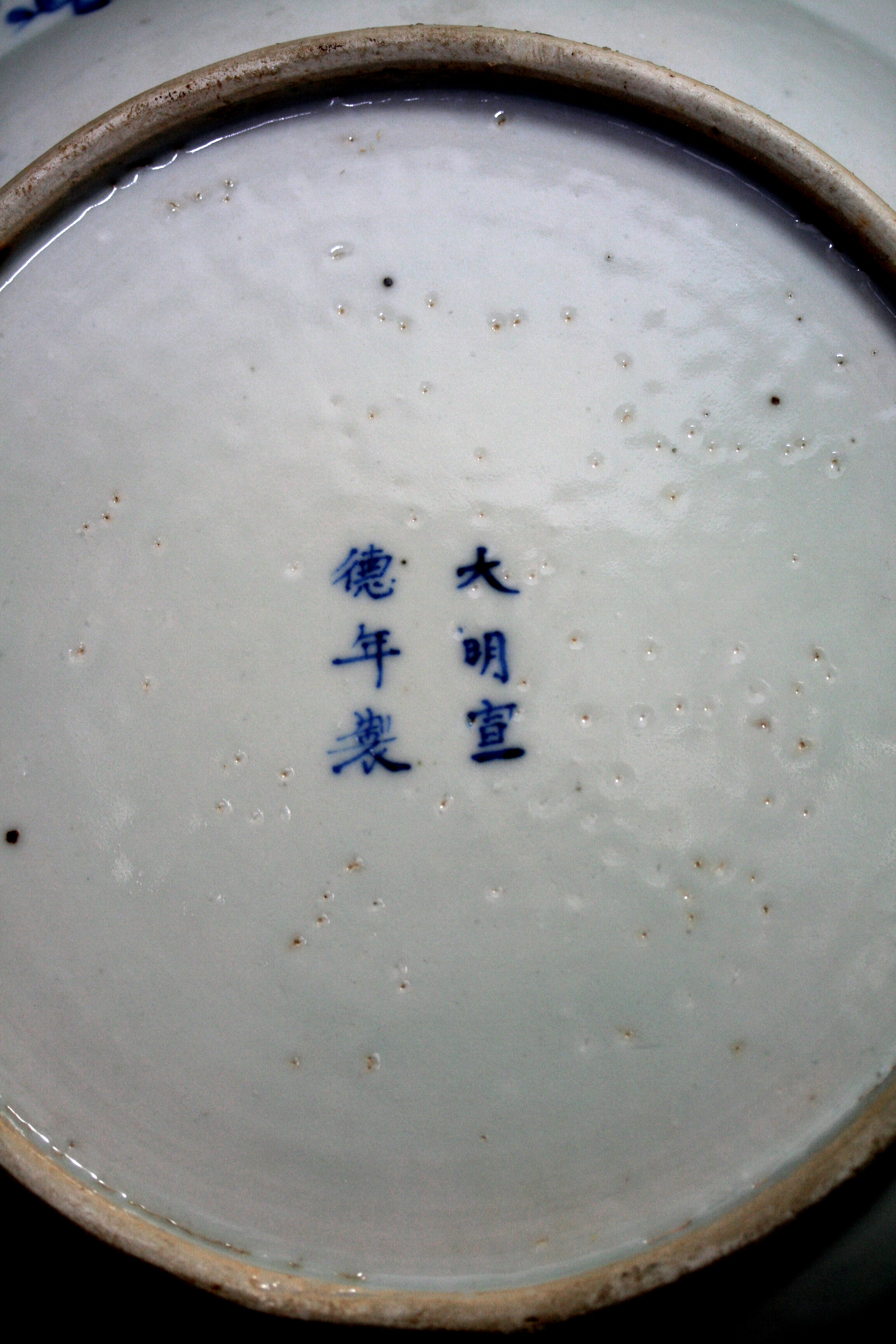
Ming-style mark

Early Kangxi mark
