= Rahlfs 1219 =

Parchment containing part of the Bible book of Psalms in Greek

Rahlfs 1219/Washington Manuscript of the Psalms
- Freer Gallery
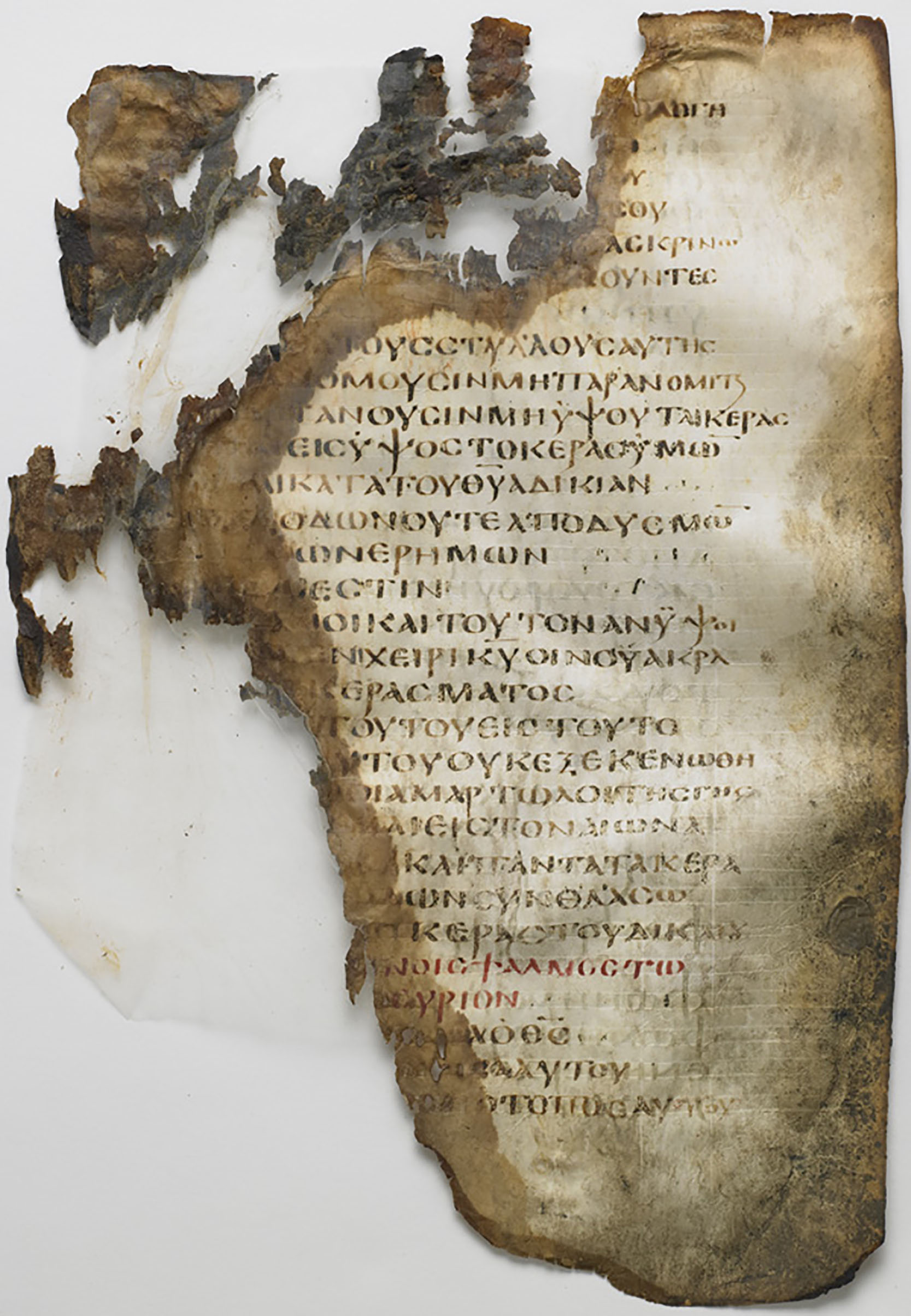
- An image of page 109 showing Psalm 74:2-75:3a
- Date: ~400–650 CE
- Material: Parchment
- Condition: Fragmentary, Decayed
- Contents: Psalm 1:4-146:9a, 149:2b-151:6; Odes 1:1-6a
- Discovered: Egypt

Rahlfs 1219 (in the Alfred Rahlfs numbering of Septuagint manuscripts), also known as the Washington Manuscript of the Psalms (Washington MS II) and van Haelst 83 (in the Van Haelst catalogue numbers of Septuagint manuscripts), is a Greek Septuagint manuscript containing the text of Psalm 1:4-146:9a, 149:2b-151:6, plus the first 6 verses of the book of Odes. It is made of parchment which has survived in a fragmentary condition. Using the study of comparative writing styles (palaeography), it has been assigned to the 5th Century CE. At some point before the 10th century CE, the last few pages of the manuscript were replaced with those from another codex.

The manuscript is one of the six biblical manuscripts purchased by industrialist Charles Lang Freer at the beginning of the 20th century, now housed at the Freer Gallery of Art in the Smithsonian Institution in Washington, D.C. It is one of the oldest manuscripts of the Greek Septuagint Psalms held in the United States of America.

== Description ==
The manuscript is a codex (precursor to the modern book format) containing the text of Psalm 1:4-151:6 and Odes 1:1-6 (from the Greek Septuagint translation of the Hebrew Bible), made of 107, badly decayed and worm eaten, parchment leaves (a total of 214 pages). In his initial description of the manuscript, biblical scholar Henry A. Sanders noted that sometime in the 10th Century CE, some of the final pages of the codex that contained Psalms 142:9-151 were lost. Rather than having new pages written, other pages from a slightly less older codex were taken and added to the end, completing the Psalms and adding six verses from the book of Odes (1:1-6a). This is apparent due to the different page size, the repetition of Psalm 142:5-8, and the divergent handwriting. Sanders indicated the original codex by the Greek letter Λ (Lambda), and the secondary codex as Λ^{a} (Lambda A).

=== Λ ===
The parchment is a mixture of goat and sheep skin. The main text is written in a dark-brown ink, with red ink used for the Psalm titles and numbers, and also for the word διαψαλμα (diapsalma / musical interlude). The text is written in one column per page, which originally would've been around 25 x 35 cm, 30 lines per page, with about 25-30 letters per line. Due to decay, almost half of each leaf is missing, with some leaves having decay covering them in their entirety, although with letters still visible. The text is written in large square uncials, with the Psalm titles usually in a slightly smaller size. Each Psalm has its number in the left hand margin in uppercase letters representing numerals, with decorative lines above and below the letter. The manuscript covers Psalms 1:4-142:8, with the last pages of the manuscript completely missing.

=== Λ^{a} ===
The parchment is made of sheepskin only. The main text is written in a medium-brown ink, with red ink used for the Psalm titles and numbers as in Λ. The text is written in one column per page, which originally would've been around 27.5 x 21.58 cm, 24 lines per page, with about 18-24 letters per line. The seven leaves are in a fragmentary condition, and would originally have contained Psalms 142:5-151:6 and Odes 1:1-6a, but due to the loss of two leaves, Psalms 146:9b-149:2b are missing. The text is written in large, sloping letters known as Slavonic uncial.

== Text ==
Λ:

The copyist used very little punctuation, with most marks occurring only at the end of lines; Sanders counts only 8 exceptions. The text is written in verses corresponding to the Hebrew parallelisms (a symmetrical device of either repeating the same idea in varying words, or exposing the opposite), with any that go over one line being written on the line below, usually with an indent to signify that it is not a new phrase. There is no stanza division (the grouping of poetic lines), but the writing does align somewhat with the stichoi (lines) of Codex Vaticanus. It has certain ligatures that represent the letters και (kai), ου (ou), μου (mou), αυτου (autou), ον (on), μαι (mai), του (tou), μνης (mnes), νην (nen), θαι (thai), and ται (tai), for the ends of lines where the text becomes crowded, although sometimes these ligatures are used within the lines themselves. There are diacritical strokes (used to indicate pitch changes) and dots over vowels (though not consistently), varying from a short grave accent to a small dot. The apostrophe is used consistently throughout, with a slightly varied shape. This appears mainly after final consonants, between double consonants, between unlike consonants, and after the Greek εκ (ek). It employs the use of numerous nomina sacra (special names/words considered sacred in Christianity) – usually the first and last letters of the name/word in question are written, followed by an overline; sometimes other letters from within the word are used as well in order to form a nomen sacrum. The manuscript consistently uses the following nomen sacrum: Θ̅Σ̅ (θεος / God), Κ̅Σ̅ (κυριος / Lord), Δ̅Α̅Δ̅ (Δαυιδ / David), and Χ̅Σ̅ (χριστος / Messiah/Anointed); with other nomina sacra used frequently: Ο̅Ρ̅Ο̅Σ̅ (ουρανος / heaven), Ι̅Η̅Λ̅ (Ισραηλ / Israel), Μ̅Η̅Ρ̅ (μητηρ / mother), Σ̅Η̅Ρ̅ (σωτηρ / saviour), Π̅Ρ̅Σ̅ (πατρος / father), Α̅Ν̅Ο̅Σ̅ (ανθρωπος / man/human), Π̅Ν̅Α̅ (πνευμα / Spirit), Υ̅Σ̅ (υιος / son), and Ι̅Η̅Λ̅Μ̅ (Ιεροσαλημ / Jerusalem).

Λ^{a}:

This part of the codex has only 11 extant cases of punctuation. The text aligns with the lines of Codex Vaticanus, with any verses going over one line being spread onto two or more lines, with indentation to signify inclusion with what precedes. Certain ligatures (representing μους, ται, αυτου, του) are used infrequently. It employs the use of numerous nomina sacra (although with slight divergence from those seen in Λ), consistently using the nomen sacrum for Θ̅Σ̅ (θεος / God), Κ̅Σ̅ (κυριος / Lord), Δ̅Α̅Δ̅ (Δαυιδ / David); with other nomina sacra used frequently: Ο̅Υ̅Ν̅Ο̅Σ̅ (ουρανος / heaven), Ι̅Σ̅Λ̅ (Ισραηλ / Israel), Π̅Ρ̅Σ̅ (πατρος / father), Α̅Ν̅Ο̅Σ̅ (ανθρωπος / man/human), Π̅Ν̅Α̅ (πνευμα / Spirit), and Ι̅Η̅Λ̅Μ̅ (Ιεροσαλημ / Jerusalem). In contrast to Λ, υιος (huios / son) is not a nomen sacrum, and μητηρ (meter / mother) doesn't occur.

== History ==
Prior to its purchase by industrialist Charles Lang Freer in 1906 from an Arab dealer named Ali from Gizah, Cairo, very little is known about the manuscript, where it came from or for whom it was written. One possible place of origin is the Church of Timothy in the Monastery of the Vinedresser, a Coptic Monastery probably destroyed during the Muslim persecutions of the 14th Century CE.

When the manuscript was granted to Sanders, he had to go through a long and precarious process of separating the leaves of the codex, which due to decay had turned the parchment into a hard, glue-like substance, becoming a solid mass. Sanders describes in detail in The Old Testament Manuscripts in the Freer Collection, Part II: The Washington Manuscript of the Psalms how he separated the leaves of the codex, which effectively employed the use of a slightly damp, woollen cloth, and a thin-bladed dinner knife.

Due to the fragmentary and fragile nature of the manuscript, Sanders was unable to separate more than two leaves in a day, having to create as accurate a collation as possible before further deterioration occurred on the leaves, and as such his reprint of the text shows letters that are now no longer extant.

Initial photographic negatives of the pages were made in 1914 by George R. Swain, which were used by Sanders for checking his collation. Further photographs of the pages were made in 1919, where one copy was sent to the British Museum in London, England, and one was placed in the Freer Gallery in Washington D.C., in the USA. Unlike some of the other Biblical manuscripts in the Freer collection, no facsimile was ever made. The reasons for this were provided to Charles Freer by classist Francis Kelsey, who states:

...that the reproduction of the other two manuscripts in facsimile [Gospels and Deut/Josh] has made it possible for scholars to check up every page with the readings reported by Professor Sanders in the monographs which have been published; the results have been so favourable as to the thoroughness and accuracy of the work of Professor Sanders, as you are already aware, that the readings reported in his monograph on the Psalms manuscript, which is now in preparation, will be accepted by all scholars without question.

The manuscript is one of the six main manuscripts that comprise the Freer Biblical Manuscripts, currently housed at The Freer Gallery of Art. Accordingly it is one of the oldest manuscripts of the Greek Septuagint Psalms housed in the United States of America. It is dated to have been written sometime in the 5th century CE.
