= Biblical Manuscripts in the Freer Collection =

Collections of biblical Greek & Coptic Manuscripts

The Biblical Manuscripts in the Freer Collection, a collection of nine biblical manuscripts, date from the 3rd to 6th centuries. Most of the manuscripts are written in Greek, four in Coptic. They are important witnesses of the history of the text of New Testament and Septuagint. The collection was established by Charles Freer (1854–1919), an industrialist from Detroit, Michigan and is held at the Freer Gallery of Art in Washington D.C.

All these manuscripts were purchased at the beginning of the 20th century in Egypt by Charles Freer. Four manuscripts were bought on 19 December 1906 from an Arab dealer named Ali in Giza, not far from Cairo. Freer paid £1,600. Upon the next expedition to Egypt, Freer met with Ali and acquired a Coptic codex of the Psalms and the earliest papyrus codex of the Minor Prophets.

Formerly these manuscripts were held in Detroit, Michigan, in Freer's private collection. He gave his art collections to the United States together with funds for a building to house them. The building cost $1,000,000, all of which was paid by Freer.

The Freer Gallery of Art was opened in 1923.

== Manuscripts ==
- W^{I}: Greek parchment codex, containing Deuteronomy and Joshua, from the early 5th century (designated as Washington Manuscript I by the Freer/Sackler Gallery).
- Rahlfs 1219: Incomplete Greek parchment codex of the Psalms from 5th century (designated as Washington Manuscript II by the Freer/Sackler Gallery).
- W (Codex Washingtonianus): Contains the four Gospels from the 5th century, with some material from 6th century (designated as Washington Manuscript III by the Freer/Sackler Gallery).
- Fragmentary Codex Freerianus, contains Pauline epistles from the 5th century (designated as Washington Manuscript IV by the Freer/Sackler Gallery).
- W: Twelve Prophets on papyri - before the discovery of the Dead Sea Scrolls, this was the oldest Greek manuscript of Twelve Prophets, of the 3rd century A.D. (designated as Washington Manuscript V by the Freer/Sackler Gallery).
- Coptic manuscript of Psalms from the 5th century.

== Gallery of Biblical Manuscripts ==
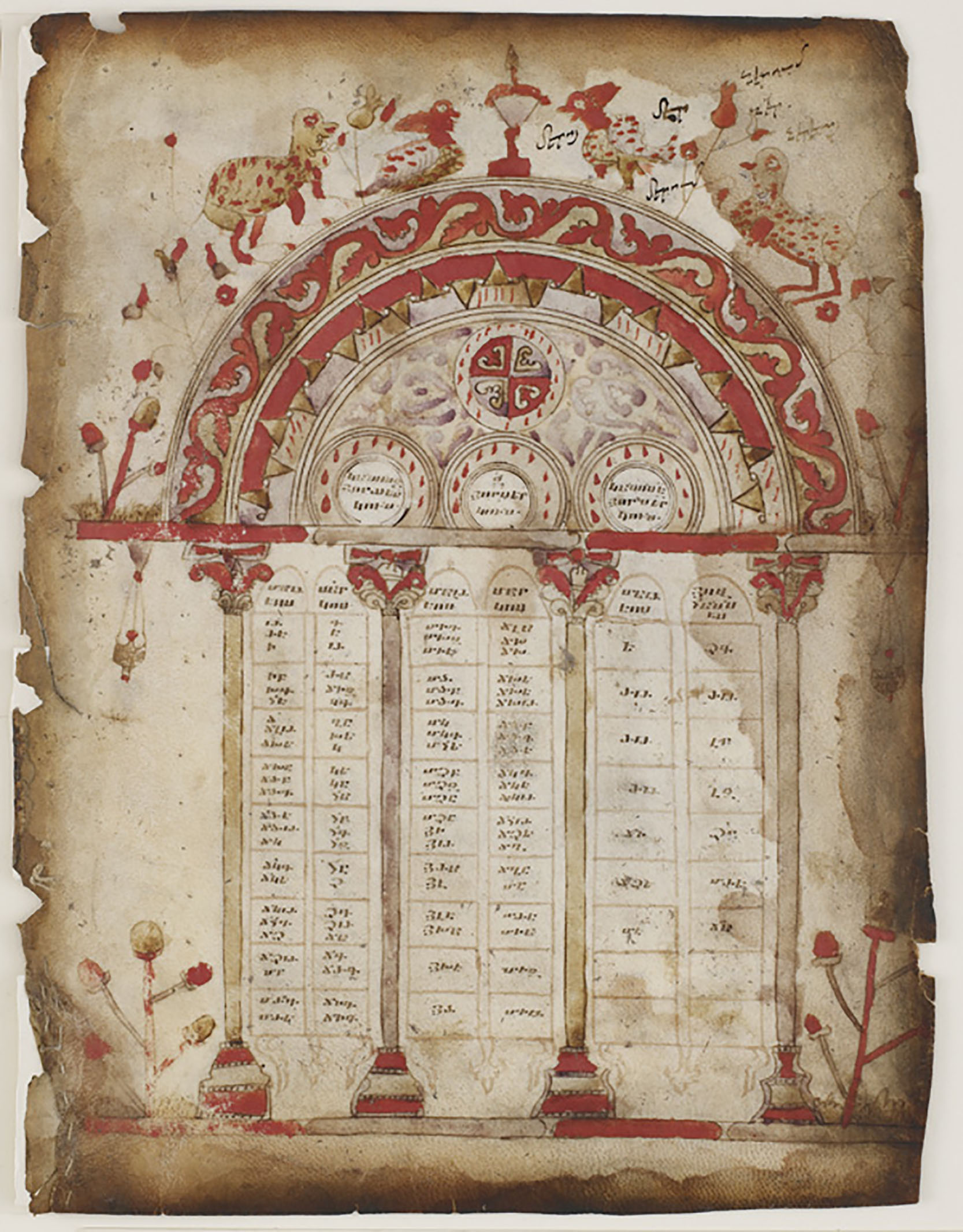

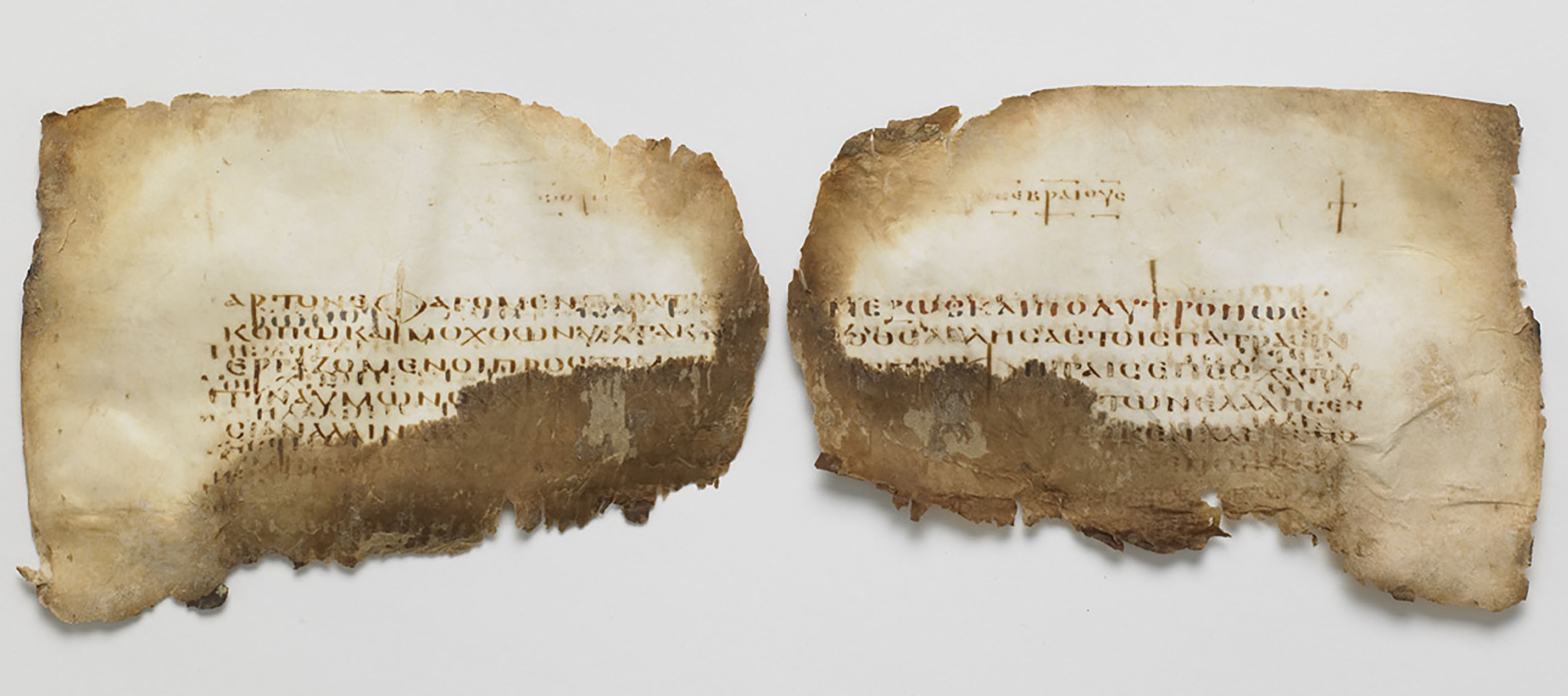

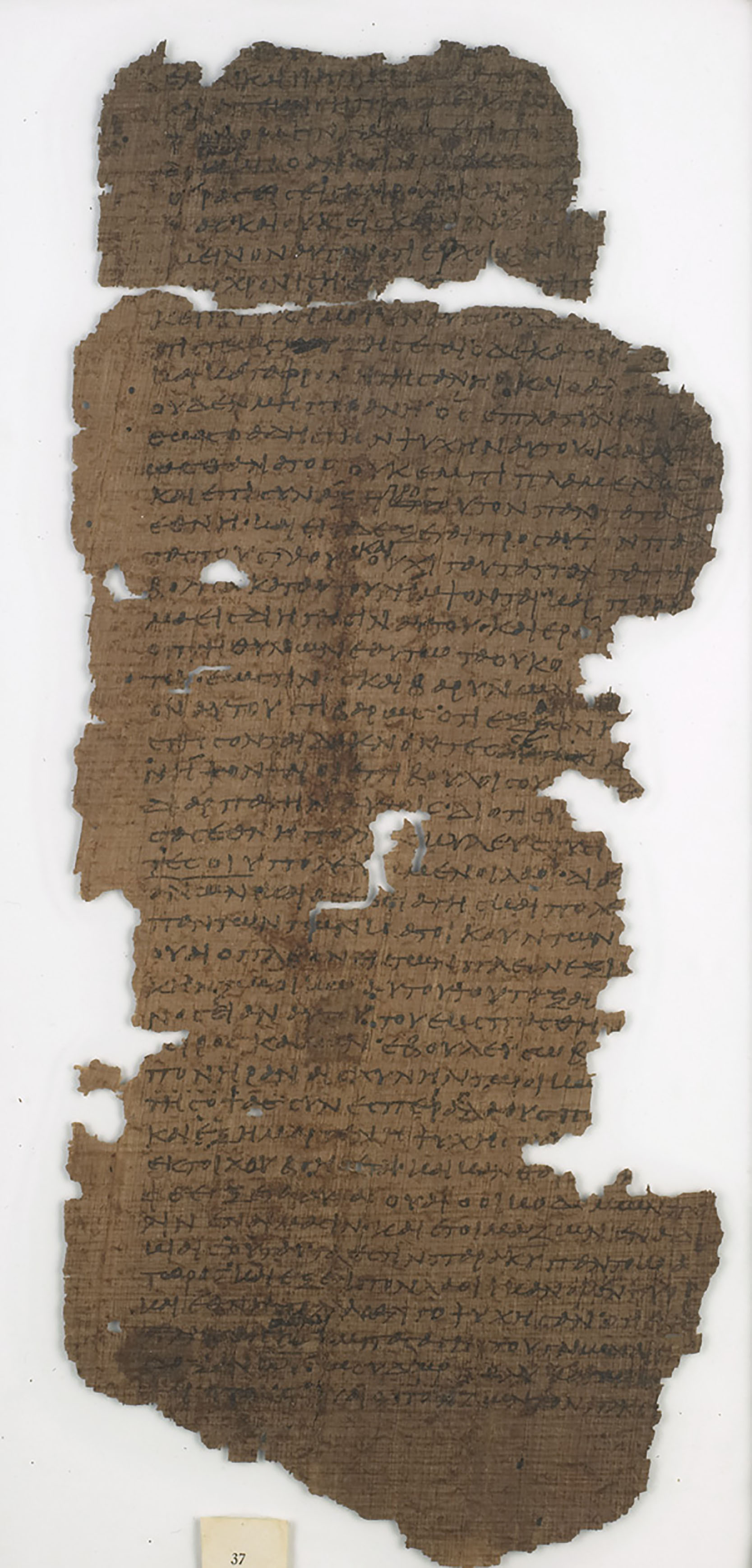

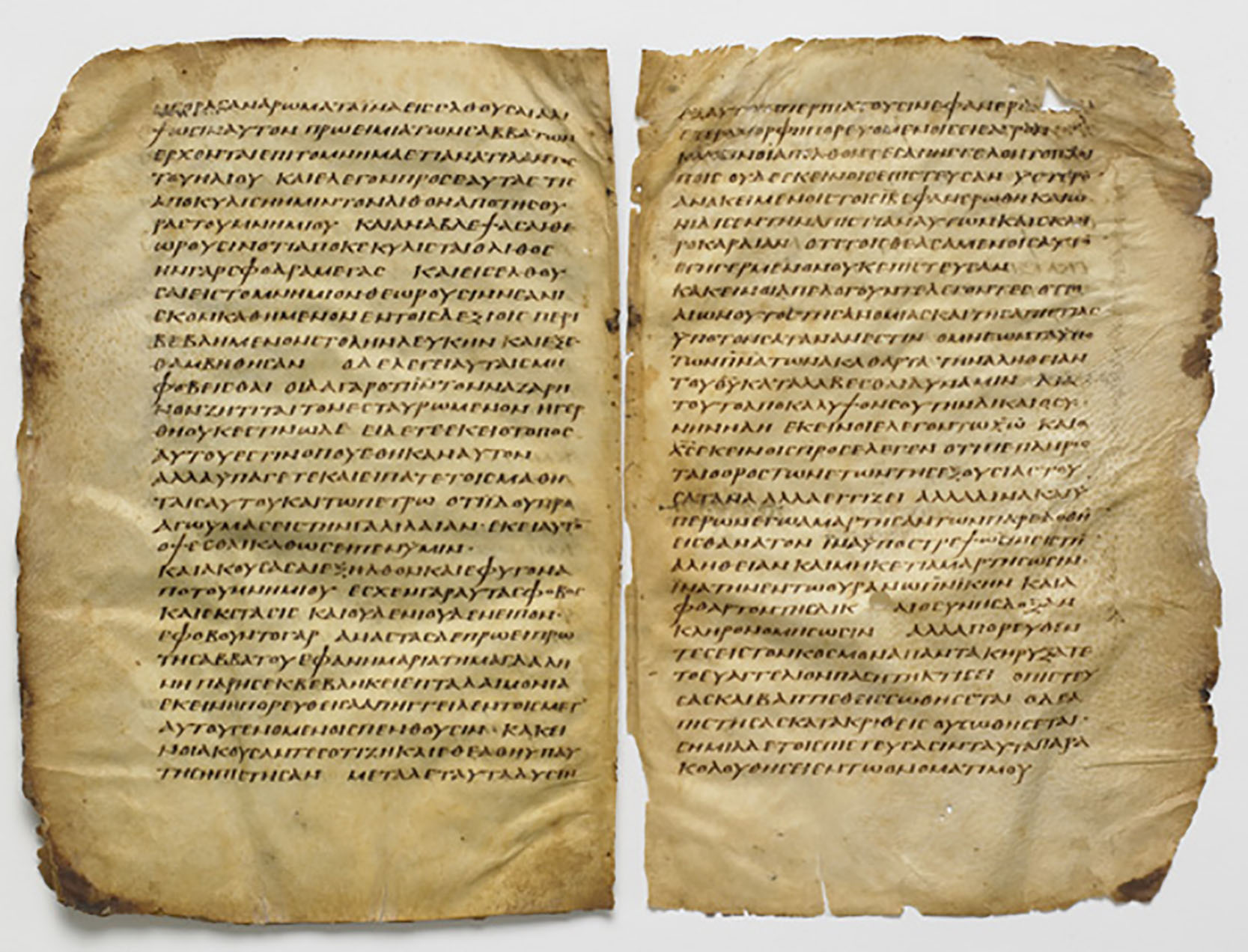

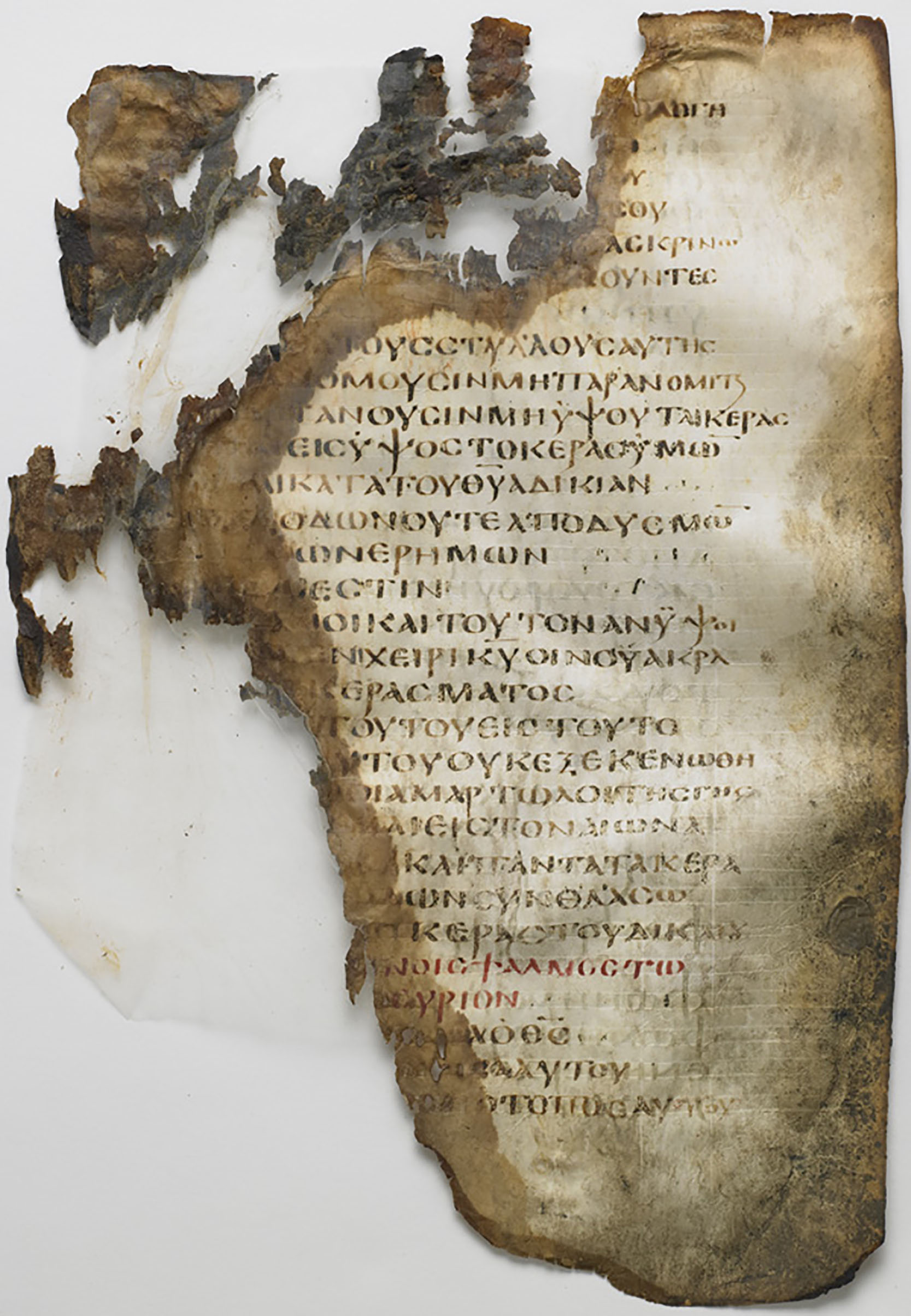

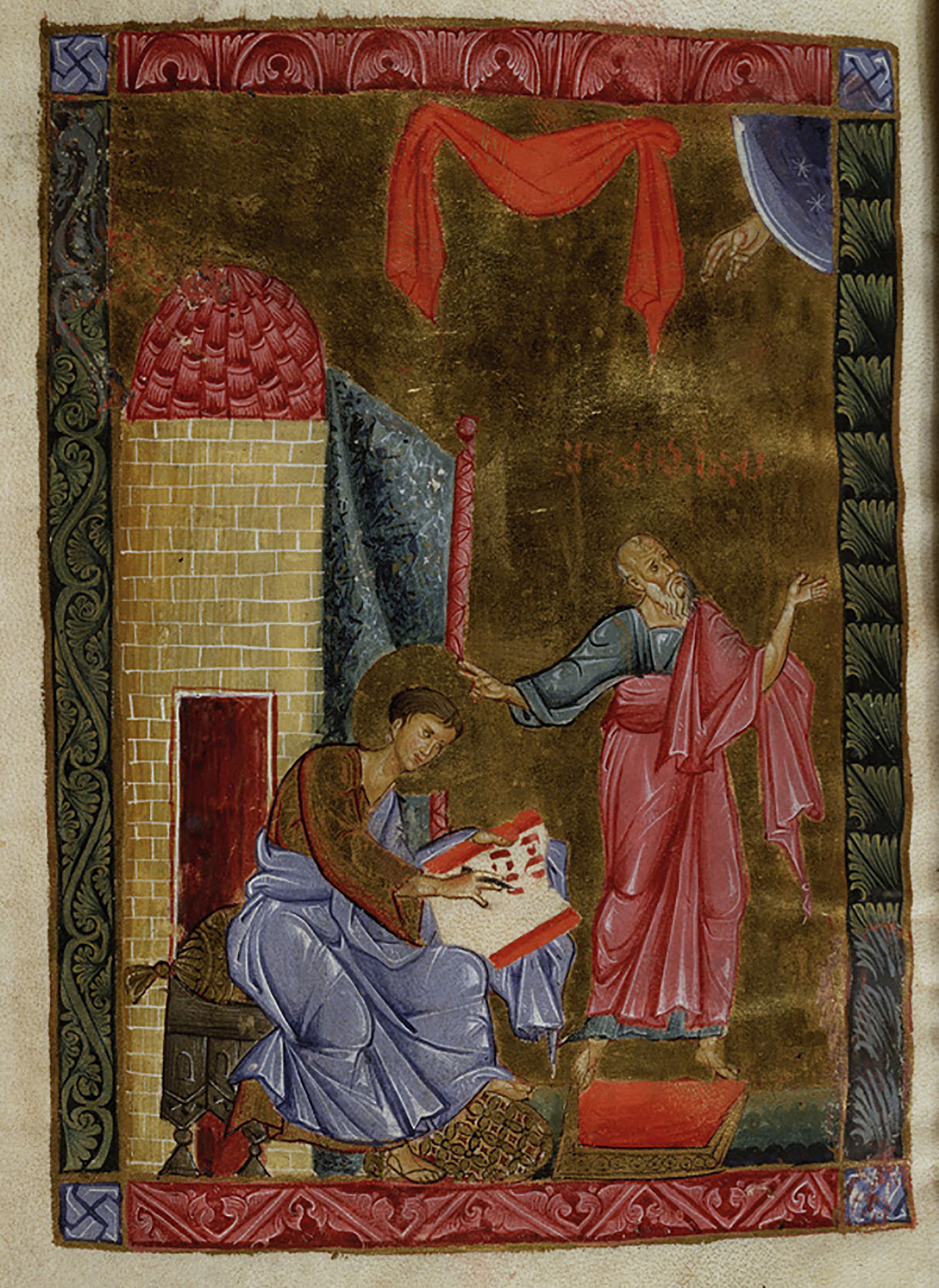

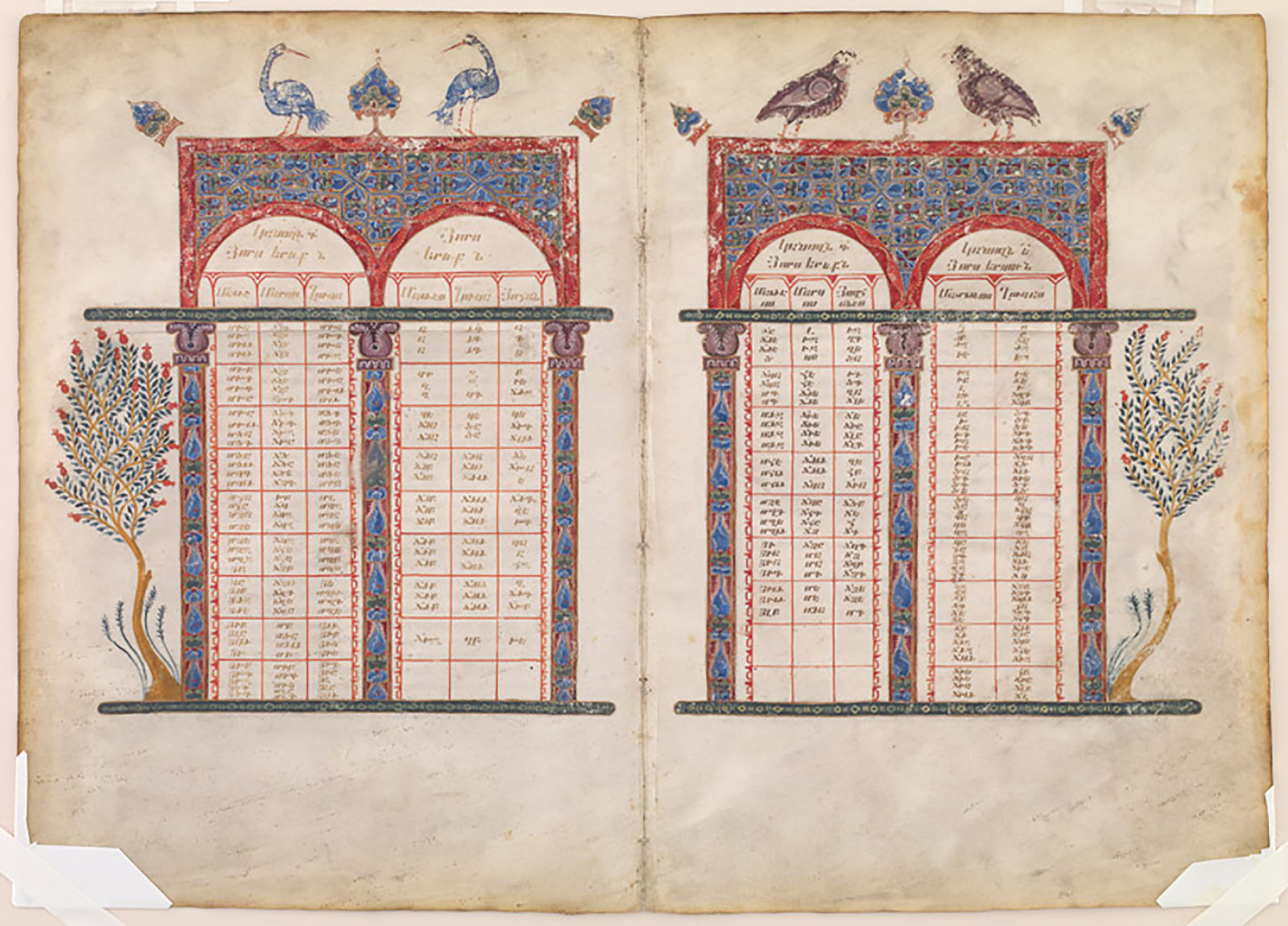

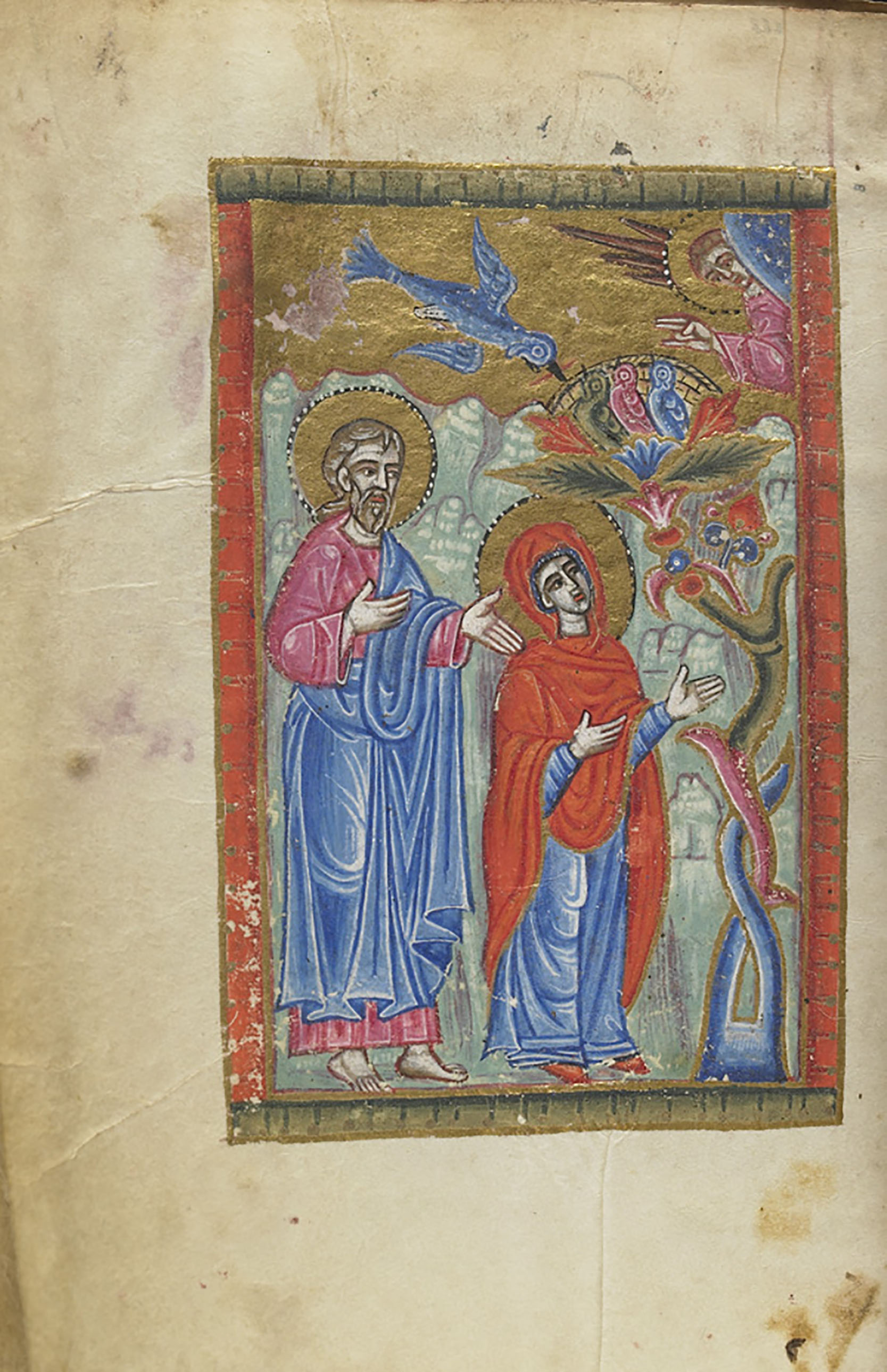

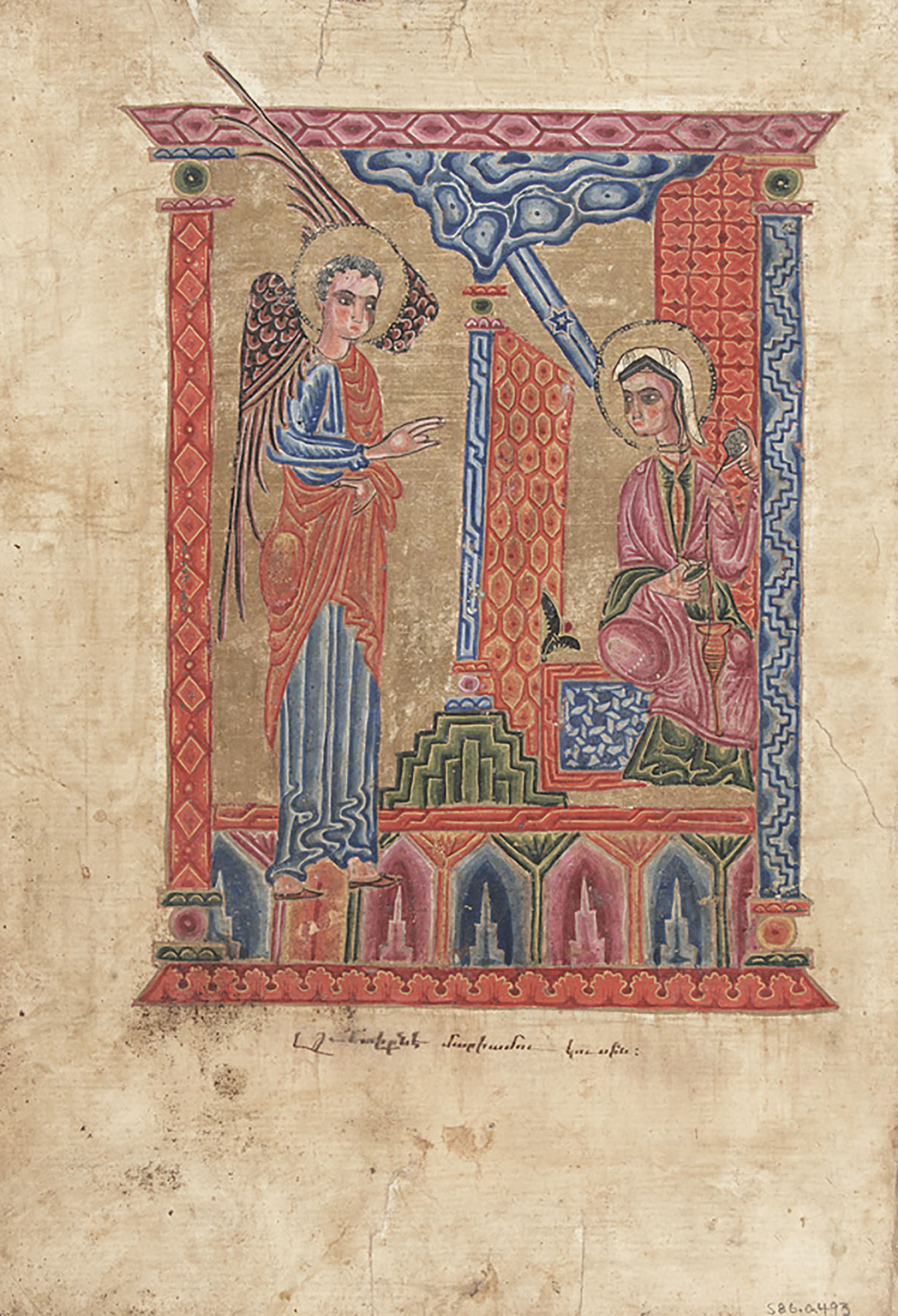

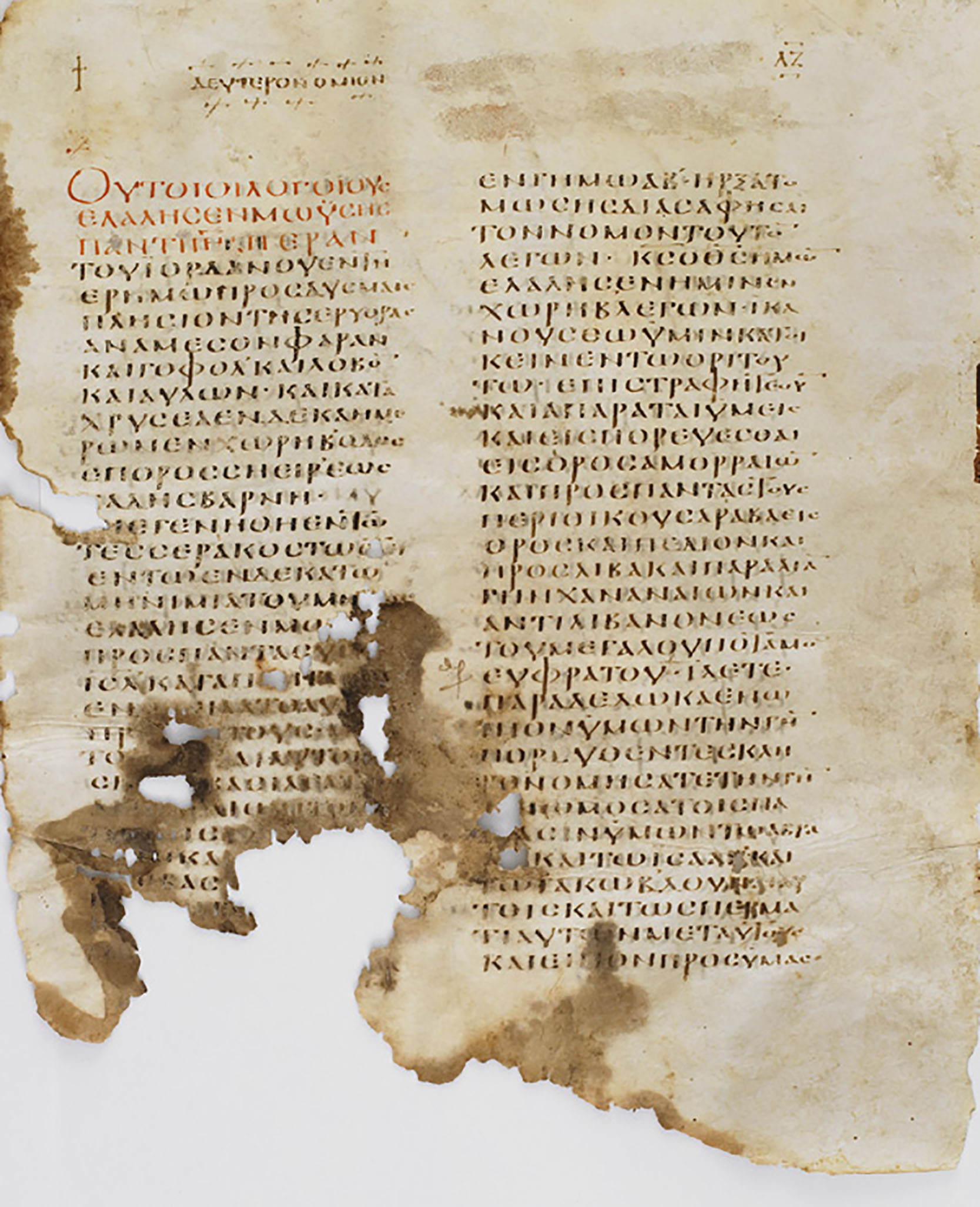

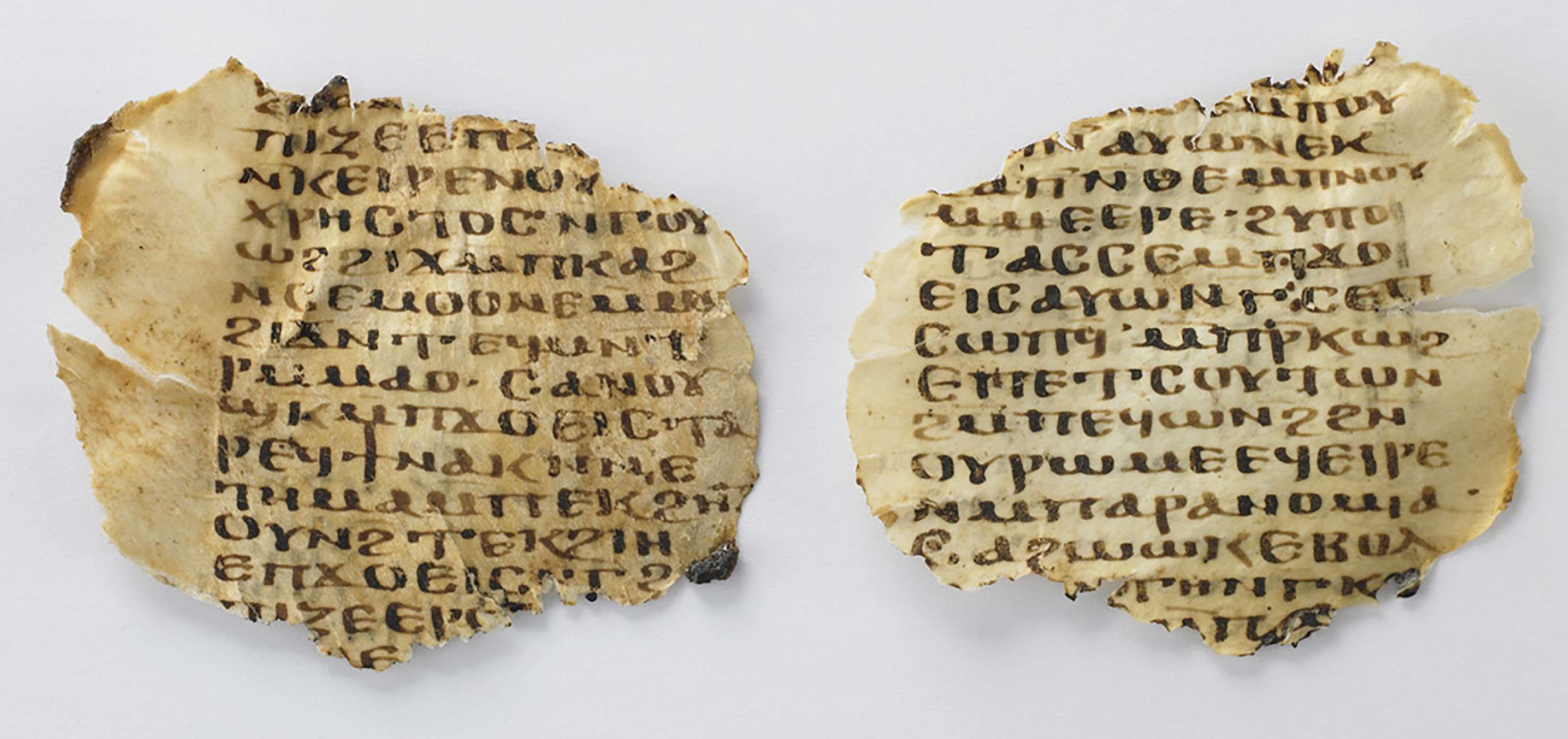

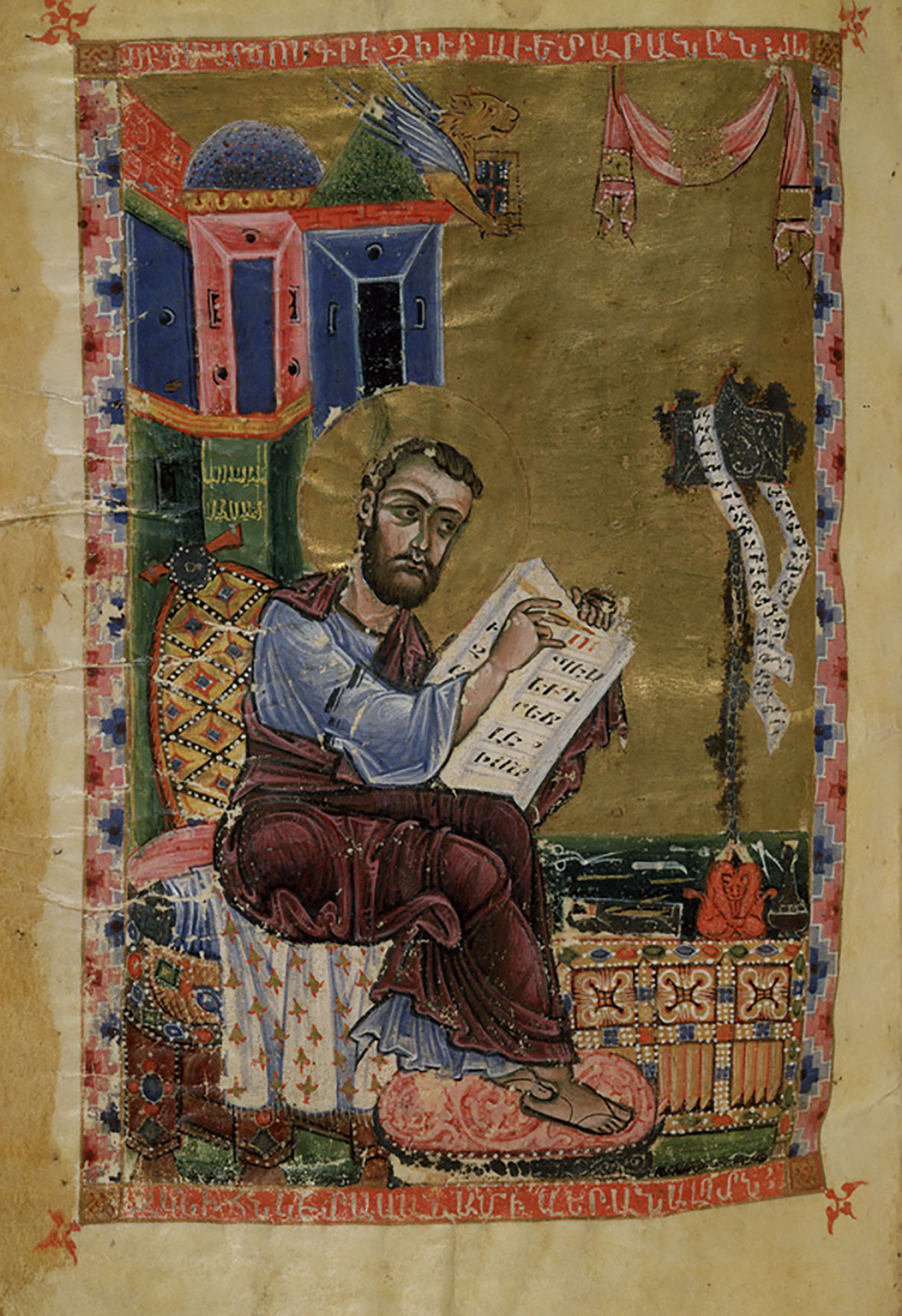

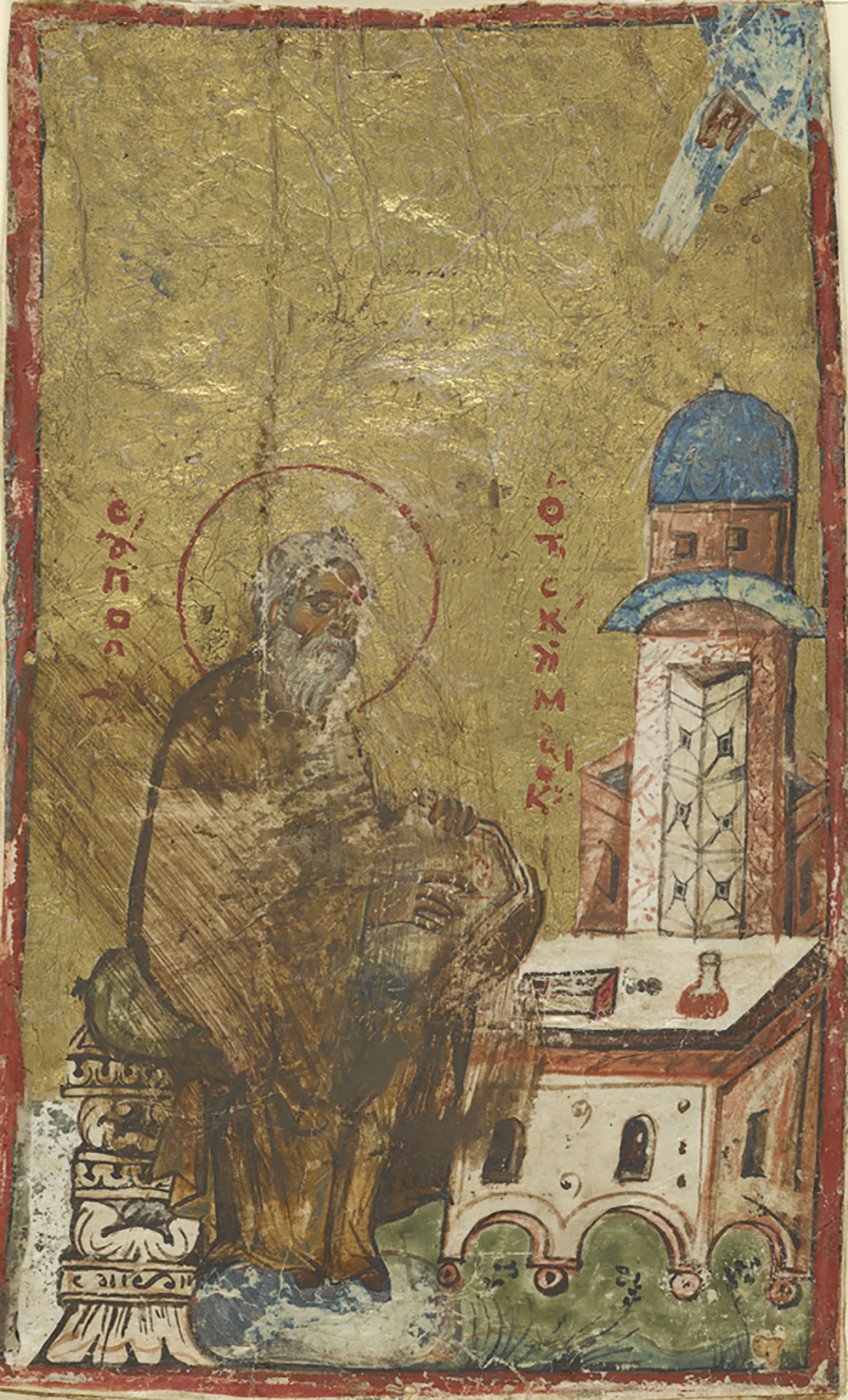

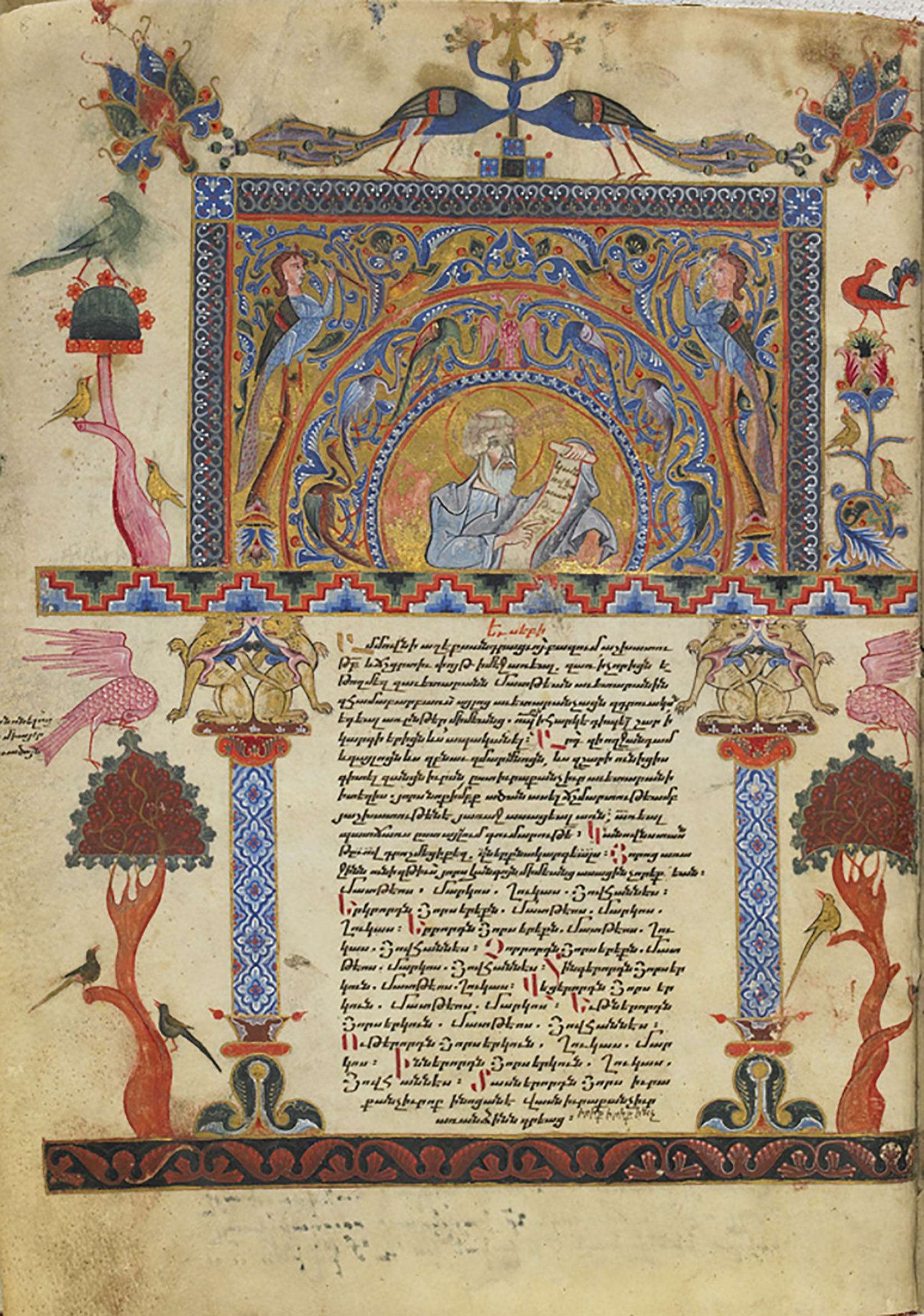

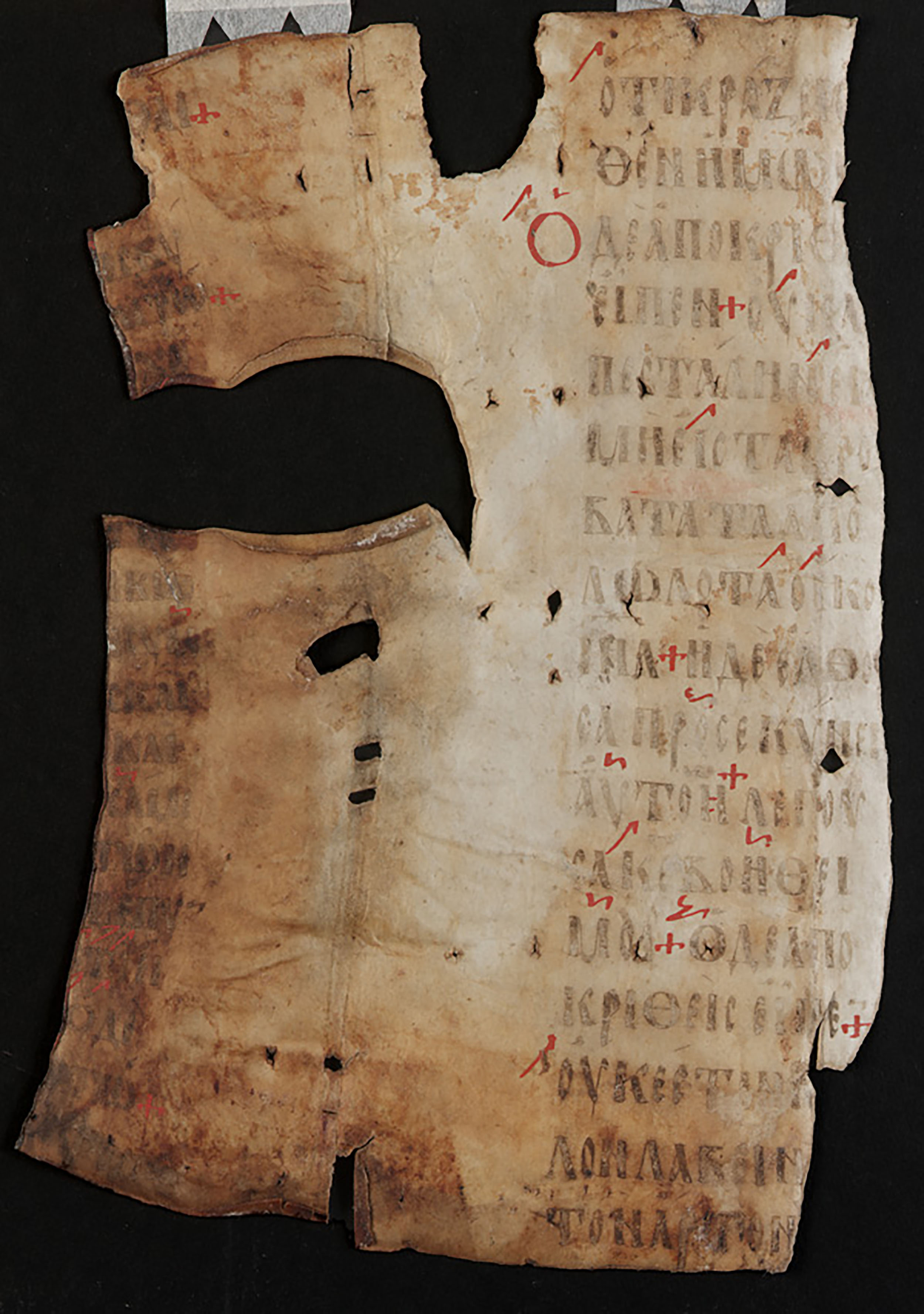

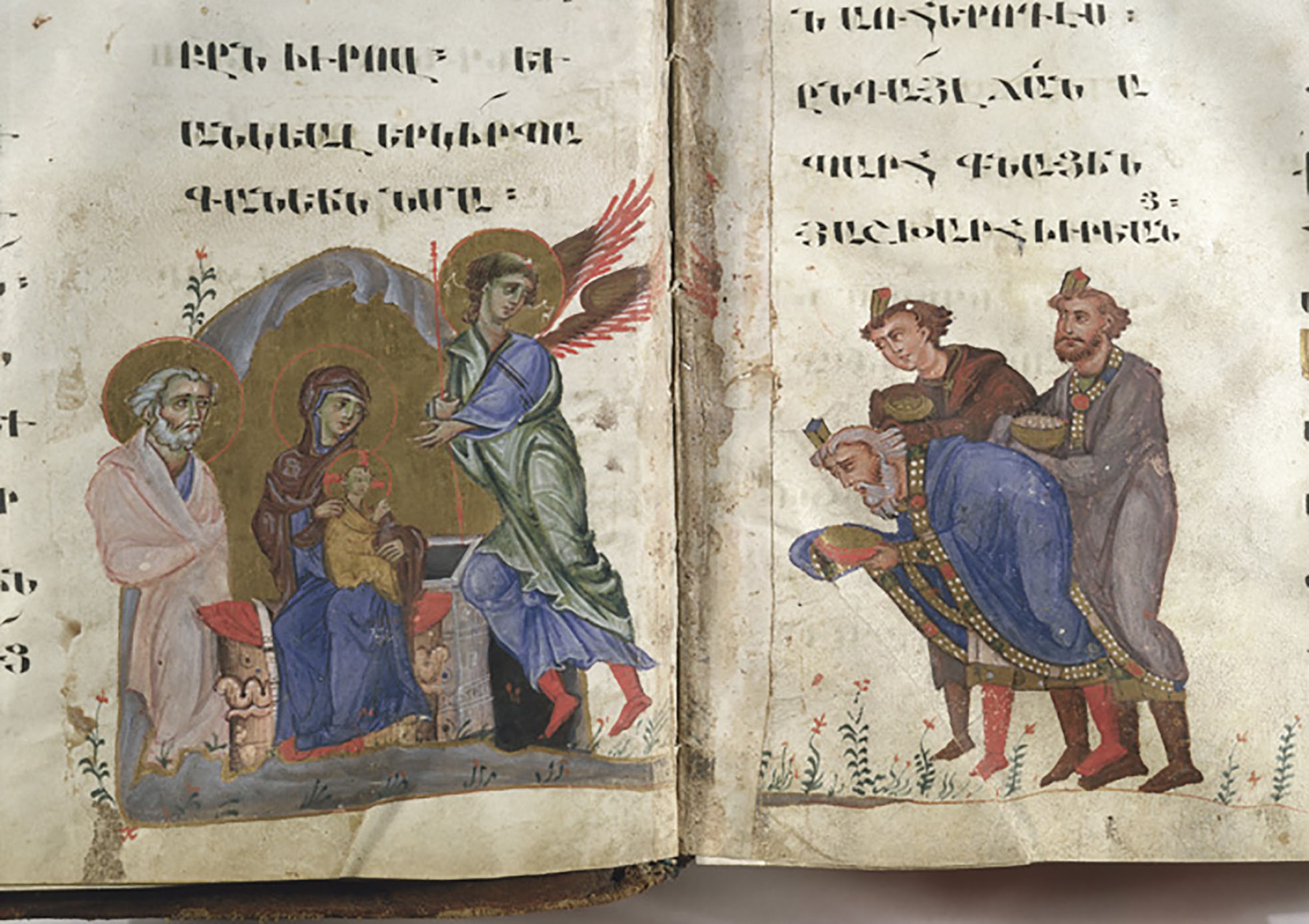
