= National Register of Historic Places listings in Wayne County, Michigan =

Location of Wayne County within the state of Michigan

This is a list of the National Register of Historic Places listings in Wayne County, Michigan.

This is intended to be a complete list of the properties and districts on the National Register of Historic Places in Wayne County, Michigan, United States. Latitude and longitude coordinates are provided for many National Register properties and districts; these locations may be seen together in an online map.

There are 370 properties and districts listed on the National Register in the county, including 14 National Historic Landmarks. The city of Detroit is the location of 282 of these properties and districts, including 10 National Historic Landmarks; they are listed separately, while 89 properties and districts, including 4 National Historic Landmarks, are listed here. A single property straddles the city limits and thus appears on more than one list.

This National Park Service list is complete through NPS recent listings posted November 6, 2026.

	District	# of sites
1	Downtown and Midtown Detroit	127
2	Remainder of Detroit	156
3	Outer Wayne County, Hamtramck, & Highland Park	92
(Duplicates):		(1)
Total:		374

== Detroit ==
The majority of NRHP properties in Wayne County are in Detroit. These properties represent over a century's worth of the city's growth, from the Charles Trowbridge House (built in 1826, and the oldest known structure in the city) to structures in the Detroit Financial District built in the late 1950s and early 1960s. However, due to the growth of Detroit and successive waves of redevelopment, there are few structures in the city dating from before the Civil War. Some of these structures, including the Trowbridge House, are private homes built along East Jefferson: the Sibley House (1848), the Beaubien House (1851), and the Moross House (1855). Other extant pre-1860 structures include Fort Wayne (1849); Saints Peter and Paul Church (1848) and Mariner's Church (1849); and scattered commercial buildings (one in Randolph Street Commercial Buildings Historic District, for example).

Most of the listed structure in Detroit are associated with the changes wrought by the establishment of substantial industry in the city (in the late 19th century) and the subsequent rise of the automobile industry to a dominant position (in the early 20th century). The historically significant structures include not only manufacturing facilities, but associated office buildings, and the commercial and residential properties built to serve the influx of people into Detroit.

In the latter half of the 19th century, multiple manufacturing firms were established near Jefferson to take advantage of the transportation resources afforded by the river and a parallel rail line. These included the shipyard that eventually became the Dry Dock Engine Works-Detroit Dry Dock Company Complex, Parke-Davis, the Frederick Stearns Company, and Globe Tobacco. The rise of manufacturing led to a new class of wealthy industrialists, entrepreneurs, and professionals who built houses along Jefferson and Woodward Avenue, including the Croul-Palms House (1881), the William H. Wells House (1889), the John N. Bagley House (1889), the Col. Frank J. Hecker House (1888) and the Charles Lang Freer House (1887). Along with these private homes, upscale apartments, such as the Coronado Apartments (1894), the Verona Apartments (1894) and a spate of churches, such as the Cass Avenue Methodist Episcopal Church (1883), the First Presbyterian Church (1889), were constructed in the city.

At the turn of the 20th century, entrepreneurs in the Detroit area—notably Henry Ford—forged into production of the automobile, capitalizing on the already-existing machine tool and coach-building industry in the city. Early automotive production is recognizable by structures such as the Ford Piquette Avenue Plant (1904) (a National Historic Landmark), and multiple structures in the surrounding Piquette Avenue Industrial Historic District (including the now-destroyed E-M-F/Studebaker Plant, 1906) and the New Amsterdam Historic District (including the original Cadillac factory, 1905. As the industry grew, newly minted automotive magnates built commercial and office buildings such as General Motors Building (1919) and the Fisher Building (1928), both National Historic Landmarks. The industry accelerated the growth of Detroit, and the population boom led to the construction of apartment buildings aimed at the middle-class auto worker, including the Somerset Apartments (1922), the Garden Court Apartments (1915), and the Manchester Apartments (1915). At the same time, new upscale neighborhoods farther from the center of the city sprang up, including Boston-Edison, Indian Village, and Palmer Woods.

Automobile wealth led to a boom in downtown Detroit business, and the construction of a collection of early 20th century skyscrapers. The most notable of these is the Art Deco National Historic Landmark Guardian Building (1928), but numerous other significant office buildings such as the Vinton Building (1916), the Barlum Tower (1927), and the Lawyers Building (1922) were also constructed. The building boom was not confined to businesses. Shopping districts sprang up along Park Avenue, Broadway, and Woodward. Multiple hotels were constructed, including the Fort Shelby Hotel (1916), the Detroit-Leland Hotel (1927), the Royal Palm Hotel (1924), and many others. Extravagant movie theaters such as the Fox (1928) and the Palms (1925) were constructed. And public buildings, such as Orchestra Hall (1919), the Detroit Public Library (1921), and the Detroit Institute of Arts (1923).

== Other municipalities ==
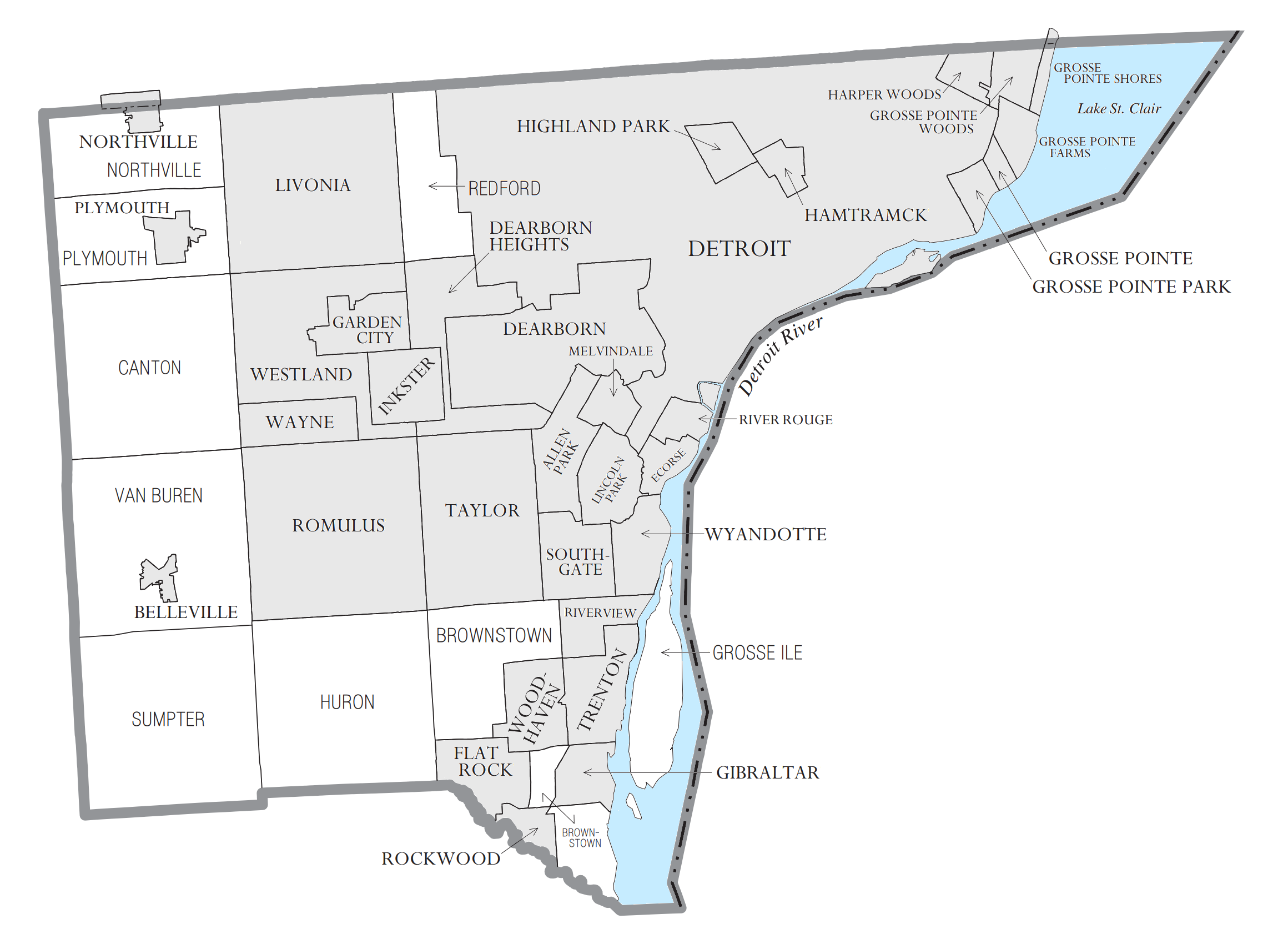
U.S. Census data map showing local municipal boundaries within Wayne County. Shaded areas represent incorporated cities.

=== Rural Western Wayne County: Canton and Livonia ===
In marked contrast to Detroit, urban and suburban development came late to the western part of Wayne County. Although suburbs are steadily encroaching into and through these areas, there are still pockets of rural land. The later development has protected some early structures, giving Canton in particular a more significant population of antebellum structures than even the older and larger Detroit. These include a string of Greek Revival structures: the Sheldon Inn (1825), Clyde House (1845), Kinyon House (1850), Bradford House (1860), and the Patterson House. Livonia also boasts Greenmead Farms, which is the original location of Joshua Simmons's 1841 Greek Revival farmhouse and 1829 barn; other structures have been moved to the site.

Victorian-era houses have also recognized. These include the Truesdell House (1888), the Fischer Farmstead (1897), the Orson Everitt House (1899), and the Smith House (1904). In addition, the Wilson Barn in Livonia, instrumental in Ira Wilson's establishment of a million-dollar dairy, creamery, and trucking business, is recognized.

However, not all historically significant structures have been protected from time and redevelopment. In particular, both the Boldman House (1835) and the Dingledey House (1881) have been demolished since their listing on the Register.

=== Village Western Wayne County: Plymouth and Northville ===
The villages of Northville and Plymouth boast historically significant houses representing a span of decades. The Northville Historic District contains numerous residential structures built between 1835 and the 1890s with most being early Gothic revival homes. Another significant property—the Robert Yerkes House—is also in Northville, but across the county line in Oakland County. Plymouth contains two important Victorian-era homes—the Italianate Henry W. Baker House (1875) and the Stick-Eastlake Charles G. Curtiss Sr. House (1890)-- as well as the Frank Lloyd Wright-designed Carlton D. Wall House (1941).

Another historically important structure is farther east in Dearborn. The Commandant's Quarters was part of the Detroit Arsenal, built in 1833 in what was then the village of Dearbornville. Despite the growth of the surrounding city and the demolition or substantial alteration of the other Arsenal structures, the Commandant's Quarters has remained relatively intact.

=== Henry Ford's Wayne County: Dearborn ===
The automobile industry has had a profound effect on the development of Wayne County, and Ford Motor Corporation founderHenry Ford is considered one of its most significant influences. Wayne County became the center for automotive manufacturing, and Ford was one of its first Road Commissioners. Five National Historic Landmarks are named after him, one being in Detroit (the Ford Piquette Avenue Plant), another (the Highland Park Ford Plant) is in Highland Park. The other three are in Dearborn.

Ford also had other properties that found their way onto the National Register. The Dearborn Inn and Colonial Homes were built by Ford as an airport hotel, and the Ford Valve Plant in Northville was an experimental factory. Perhaps most significantly, the Henry Ford Square House was built by Henry Ford himself soon after his marriage to Clara Ford, and well before his ascent to being the richest man in the world.

=== The Enclaves: Highland Park and Hamtramck ===
Together, Highland Park and Hamtramck form an enclave within the city of Detroit. Both were established as independent municipalities when Detroit was much smaller than its current size, and remained so as the larger city grew to engulf them both. Both cities also owe much of their history and present character to the rise and eventual decline of the automobile industry. As noted, the most significant structure within Highland Park is the Highland Park Ford Plant (1910); likewise Hamtramck housed the huge Dodge Main plant (1914). Both plants attracted huge numbers of workers, swelling the populations of both cities.

The influx of workers required housing. Two neighborhoods in Highland Park: Highland Heights-Stevens' Subdivision and Medbury's-Grove Lawn Subdivisions were significant because of their relatively middle-class residents who were able to build solid houses. The burgeoning population also required religious buildings. These included St. Florian (1928) in Hamtramck, serving the primarily Polish residents of the city, and the Highland Park Presbyterian Church (1910), First United Methodist Church (1916), Trinity United Methodist Church (1911), and the Grace Evangelical Lutheran Church (1929) in Highland Park.

=== Northeast Wayne County: The Grosse Pointes ===
The rise in industry and the automobile also affected the Grosse Pointes. This section of the county was a primarily agricultural district throughout much of the 19th century until Detroit's nouveau riche discovered the area and began building summer cottages there. As automobiles became more prevalent, and outlying suburbs more accessible, the Pointes quickly became a community of year-round upper-class residents. The historic structures within the cities reflect its transition to the home of wealthy Detroiters. These structures include early 20th-century houses in the Beverly Road Historic District and single-family homes such as the Carl E. and Alice Candler Schmidt House (1909) and the Russell A. Alger Jr. House (1910).

The growing population at the turn of the 20th century also called for the construction of educational buildings such as Defer Elementary School (1924) Grosse Pointe South High School (1927), Père Gabriel Richard Elementary School (1929), and religious buildings such as Saint Paul Catholic Church (1895), Grosse Pointe Memorial Church (1923), and Christ Church Chapel (1930).

=== Downriver: Lincoln Park, Wyandotte, and Grosse Ile ===
Lincoln Park is a blue-collar downriver suburb. The two properties in the city, the Lincoln Park Post Office and Mellus Newspapers Building are both of relatively recent origin.

In contrast, Wyandotte is an older city, and has seen its share of wealthy citizens. The Marx House, built by Warren Isham in 1862, housed a number of the city's most prominent citizens, and did the John and Emma Lacey Eberts House, built in 1872. Industrial giant Edward Ford was the son of glass pioneer John Baptiste Ford and the founder of the Michigan Alkalai Company in Wyandotte and the Ford Plate Glass Company in Toledo, Ohio (later the Libbey–Owens–Ford Company). Ford built both the impressive Ford-Bacon House and the George P. MacNichol House across the street.

Grosse Ile, near the southern tip of Wayne County, is a historically wealthy island community. Beginning in the middle of the 19th century, well-to-do businessmen from Detroit built summer homes on the island to escape the city. Some of the earliest mansions are included in the East River Road Historic District, and the nearby St. James Episcopal Church was built not long after the end of the Civil War.

=== Wayne County bridges ===
The Wayne County Road Commission was internationally renowned for its innovation. The historic bridges of Wayne County are scattered throughout the county, with two in the far western portion, one in Dearborn, three in Detroit, and the remainder close to the Detroit River south of the city. The western bridges—the Waltz Road – Huron River Bridge and the Lilley Road-Lower Rouge River Bridge—exemplify the population and traffic expansion in that portion of Wayne County during the early part of the century, and demonstrate the benefits of standardization in bridge construction adopted by the Road Commission. Likewise, the bridges along the river and on Grosse Ile show the variety of small bridges and culverts the Commission constructed.

The Detroit bridges were a result of a grade separation carried on by the commission to separate rail and automotive traffic, necessitated by the rise of the automobile. Another example of accommodating different modes of traffic is the bascule construction of the West Jefferson Avenue – Rouge River Bridge. This was built to maintain shipping traffic in the river while allowing for automobile traffic along West Jefferson. The most recent of the historical bridges, the US 12 Bridges in Dearborn, represent the first crosstown expressway carrying automobile traffic through Detroit.

== Listings ==
	Name on the Register	Image	Date listed	Location	City or town	Description
1	Academy of the Sacred Heart	Academy of the Sacred Heart	June 25, 1987 (#87001061)	171 Lake Shore Dr. 42°23′35″N 82°53′37″W	Grosse Pointe Farms	This school was established in 1887 as a boarding school for young ladies by the Religious of the Sacred Heart, an order of cloistered nuns. It is now run as an independent day school, known as the Grosse Pointe Academy, by a lay Board of Trustees who continue the educational mission of the school.
2	Russell A. Alger Jr. House	Russell A. Alger Jr. House	July 8, 1982 (#82002917)	32 Lake Shore Dr. 42°23′13″N 82°53′50″W	Grosse Pointe Farms	The Russell A. Alger Jr. House was built in 1910 and served as the family home of Russell A. Alger Jr. until 1949, when it was donated to the community and dedicated to the memory of veterans and soldiers of World War II. It was rechristened the Grosse Pointe War Memorial, and is also known as The Moorings.
3	Annapolis Park Historic District	Annapolis Park Historic District	May 18, 2006 (#06000405)	Julius, Matthew, Hanover, Farnum, Alan, and Paul; 42°16′14″N 83°19′59″W	Westland	During World War II, the African-American population in Detroit ballooned to 300,000 residents, but housing covenants, overpriced rent, and other forms of discrimination restricted where they could live. Julius and William Schwartz platted the Annapolis Park suburb in Westland in 1953 specifically for African-Americans.
4	Henry W. Baker House	Henry W. Baker House	April 22, 1982 (#82002922)	233 S. Main St. 42°22′19″N 83°28′03″W	Plymouth	This house was built for Henry W. Baker, president of the Plymouth Iron Windmill Company, which in 1888 introduced the Daisy air rifle and later changed its name to the Daisy Manufacturing Company. The house is of a fanciful Italianate design, likely based on an illustration in a pattern book. The house was a landmark in Plymouth because of the unusual tower, shaped like a pagoda, atop the mansard roof.
5	Tivadar and Dorothy Balogh House	Tivadar and Dorothy Balogh House	September 30, 2013 (#13000800)	49800 Joy Road (Plymouth Township); 42°21′02″N 83°31′52″W	Cherry Hill vicinity	The Tivadar and Dorothy Balogh House was constructed in 1958-59 by architect Tividar Balogh for himself, his wife, Dorothy and their family. The house is a two-story cubic structure, clad in redwood siding. The house sits on a partial basement on one side and support posts on the other side. The section beneath the house was originally open; the space beneath gives the house an impressive "lightness" and makes it appear to hover above the landscape.
6	Thomas and Maria Blackman Bartlett House	Thomas and Maria Blackman Bartlett House	June 2, 2000 (#00000614)	500 N. Ridge Rd. (Canton Township); 42°18′30″N 83°32′05″W	Cherry Hill	The Thomas and Maria Blackman Bartlett House (also known as the Bartlett-Travis House) was originally constructed c. 1840 in a Greek Revival style, but in subsequent years has been updated with Victorian elements. In 1989, the house was moved to its current location and placed on a new foundation. Restoration work was begun in 1994 and finished in 2002.
7	Beverly Road Historic District	Beverly Road Historic District	April 7, 1995 (#94001428)	23-45 Beverly Rd. 42°23′18″N 82°54′06″W	Grosse Pointe Farms	The Beverly Road Historic District covers the original area of the Beverly Park Subdivision, platted by Henry B. Joy in 1911. The district was one of the earliest upper-class subdivisions in the Grosse Pointes, and marked the change of the area from a farming and summer-home community into an upscale year-round community.
8	David and Elizabeth Bell Boldman House	David and Elizabeth Bell Boldman House	June 2, 2000 (#00000615)	3339 S. Canton Center Rd. (Canton Township); 42°16′54″N 83°29′09″W	Sheldon	The David and Elizabeth Bell Boldman House was a basilica-style Greek Revival with a two-story center section flanked by single-story wings. The former site of the house is now vacant.
9	Benjamin and Mary Ann Bradford House	Benjamin and Mary Ann Bradford House	June 9, 2000 (#00000648)	48145 Warren Rd. 42°20′07″N 83°30′54″W	Canton	In 1825, Moses Bradford moved to Canton Township, one of the first settlers to stake a claim in the area. The following year, Aruna and Mary Bradford, Moses's parents, followed their son to Canton Township. On arrival, they bought the property this house now sits on; in 1835 they sold the parcel to their other son, Benjamin. In 1860, Benjamin built the house that now stands on the property; it remained in the Bradford family until 1911.
10	Cadieux School		April 28, 2023 (#100008912)	389 Saint Clair Ave. 42°23′02″N 82°54′43″W	Grosse Pointe	
11	Jos. Campau Historic District	Jos. Campau Historic District	October 17, 2012 (#12000870)	Bounded by Holbrook, Pulaski, Casmere, & Lehman Sts. 42°23′55″N 83°03′32″W	Hamtramck	The Jos. Campau Historic District contains a unique collection of early 20th century commercial architecture, constructed as Hamtramck expanded in the wake of the 1915 opening of the nearby Dodge Main Plant.
12	Cherry Hill Historic District	Cherry Hill Historic District	April 2, 2003 (#03000176)	Cherry Hill and Ridge Rds. 42°18′17″N 83°32′20″W	Canton Township	The Cherry Hill Historic District contains buildings on Cherry Hill and Ridge Roads in the unincorporated crossroads community of Cherry Hill. Cherry Hill was established in 1825, and the district includes the Italianate Cherry Hill House inn, the Gothic Revival Cherry Hill United Methodist Church and associated cemetery, the Cherry Hill School, the Thomas and Maria Blackman Bartlett House, the Thomas and Isabella Moore Clyde House, and buildings used for one of Henry Ford's Village industry projects.
13	Christ Church Chapel	Christ Church Chapel	September 10, 1993 (#93000424)	61 Grosse Pointe Rd. 42°23′29″N 82°54′03″W	Grosse Pointe Farms	The Grosse Pointe Episcopal congregation began as a branch of Christ Church Detroit in 1923. This building, completed in 1930, was initially referred to as a "chapel," because it was intended to be one element of a larger building. The Neo-Gothic chapel is built in a Latin cross configuration with a 50-foot (15 m) tower at one corner.
14	Thomas and Isabella Moore Clyde House	Thomas and Isabella Moore Clyde House	April 2, 2003 (#03000175)	50325 Cherry Hill Rd. 42°18′21″N 83°32′07″W	Canton Township	The Thomas Clyde House is a 1 1/2-story clapboard upright and wing Greek Revival house with an unusual asymmetrical facade. It was built c. 1845, and moved from its original location across the street to its present location in 1924.
15	Commandant's Quarters	Commandant's Quarters	October 15, 1970 (#70000286)	21950 Michigan Ave. 42°18′23″N 83°14′38″W	Dearborn	The Commandant's Quarters was built in 1833 as part of the Detroit Arsenal, which was relocated from Detroit due to fear that the stored explosives would endanger the city's population. It is the oldest building in Dearborn still located on its original site, and is considered to be one of the seven most significant buildings in Michigan.
16	Charles G. Curtiss Sr. House	Charles G. Curtiss Sr. House	December 2, 1993 (#93001350)	168 S. Union St. 42°22′19″N 83°27′58″W	Plymouth	This house is a two-story wood-framed house sitting on a fieldstone foundation. It was built in approximately 1890 by Charles G. Curtiss Sr., a builder from Plymouth. The form of the house (a gabled ell with tower) had been popular regionally and nationally since the 1850s, but by the time this house was built was much out of fashion.
17	Dearborn City Hall Complex	Dearborn City Hall Complex	August 25, 2014 (#14000513)	13615 Michigan Ave. 42°19′17″N 83°10′36″W	Dearborn	This complex includes three connected municipal structures: the 1921 Dearborn City Hall designed by Marcus Burrowes, the 1929 Police and Municipal Courts Building, and a non-contributing office/auditorium concourse addition constructed in 1981.
18	Dearborn Country Club	Dearborn Country Club	March 10, 2025 (#100011221)	800 North Military St. 42°19′04″N 83°15′17″W	Dearborn	
19	Dearborn Inn and Colonial Homes	Dearborn Inn and Colonial Homes	December 10, 1982 (#82000549)	20301 Oakwood Blvd. 42°17′48″N 83°13′41″W	Dearborn	The Dearborn Inn, was conceived by Henry Ford, who saw a need for food and accommodations for visitors flying into the nearby Ford Airport. The Inn was designed by architect Albert Kahn, and upon its opening in 1931 became the first airport hotel in the country.
20	Defer Elementary School	Defer Elementary School	May 2, 2001 (#01000458)	15425 Kercheval; 42°23′00″N 82°56′07″W	Grosse Pointe Park	In 1921, in response to the influx of families, five school districts in what is now the Grosse Pointe area were consolidated into Rural Agricultural District No. 1 (later renamed the Grosse Pointe Public School System). The first building constructed after consolidation was Defer Elementary School, built on the site of a rhubarb patch owned by Ludwig Meininger.
21	Paul Harvey Deming House	Paul Harvey Deming House	July 25, 1996 (#96000811)	111 Lake Shore Rd. 42°23′30″N 82°53′40″W	Grosse Pointe Farms	This house was a 15,000-square-foot (1,400 m^{2}), 2 1/2-story Tudor Revival built in the shape of a U. It was built for Paul Harvey Deming, Chairman of the Board of the George Worthington Company. The house was demolished in 1997.
22	Phillip and Maria Hasselbach Dingledey House	Phillip and Maria Hasselbach Dingledey House	June 2, 2000 (#00000616)	1638 N. Haggerty Rd. (Canton Township); 42°19′06″N 83°26′55″W	Westland	The Phillip and Maria Hasselbach Dingledey House was an upright and wing style farmhouse with a relatively unusual double upright. The house is no longer at its listed location; a small commercial complex now occupies the site.
23	East River Road Historic District	East River Road Historic District	August 13, 1974 (#74001003)	East River Rd. near the Grosse Ile Parkway; 42°07′33″N 83°08′30″W	Grosse Ile	This district includes several Gothic Revival mansions built in the 1850s, St. James Episcopal Church (also on the Register) and the Michigan Central Railroad Depot.
24	East River Road – North Hickory Canal Bridge	East River Road – North Hickory Canal Bridge	February 4, 2000 (#00000042)	E. River Rd. over N. Hickory Canal; 42°05′46″N 83°09′02″W	Grosse Ile	The East River Road – North Hickory Canal Bridge is 64 feet (20 m) continuous concrete slab bridge. Wayne County used this type of bridge in the years during and after World War II, presumably because of the difficulty of obtaining steel during these years.
25	John and Emma Lacey Eberts House	John and Emma Lacey Eberts House	July 16, 2009 (#09000524)	109 Vinewood Ave. 42°12′27″N 83°09′02″W	Wyandotte	In 1872, John Eberts Jr. married Emma Lacey, and that same year the couple hired Raphael R. Thomas to build this house.
26	Orson Everitt House	Orson Everitt House	October 14, 1980 (#80001933)	39040 W. Seven Mile Rd. 42°25′31″N 83°25′47″W	Livonia	This irregularly massed Queen Anne features a broad porch and a circular turret. It is likely the design of the house was selected from a house plan book; a similar house plan can be found in Herbert C. Chivers' Artistic Homes.
27	Fair Lane	Fair Lane	November 13, 1966 (#66000399)	4901 Evergreen Rd. 42°18′58″N 83°14′08″W	Dearborn	Fair Lane was Henry and Clara Ford's estate in Dearborn, Michigan. It was named after an area in County Cork where Ford's adoptive grandfather, Patrick Ahern, was born. The extensive 1,300 acres (5.3 km^{2}) estate along the River Rouge included a large limestone house, electrical power plant on the dammed river, boathouse, stables and gardens designed by Jens Jensen. The estate was eventually donated to the University of Michigan for a new Dearborn campus.
28	Ferry Street – Thorofare Canal Bridge	Ferry Street – Thorofare Canal Bridge	February 18, 2000 (#00000118)	Ferry St. over Thorofare Canal; 42°08′17″N 83°09′23″W	Grosse Ile	The Ferry Street-Thorofare Canal Bridge is a good representative example of a continuous concrete slab, used by the Wayne County Road Commission during World War II and immediately after, presumably due to the difficulty of obtaining steel.
29	William Hawkins Ferry House		May 9, 2019 (#100003936)	874 Lake Shore Rd. 42°26′32″N 82°52′32″W	Grosse Pointe Shores	W. Hawkins Ferry was one of four children of businessman and politician Dexter M. Ferry Jr. He was a prominent proponent of Detroit architecture, and in 1964 hired architect William Henry Kessler to design this house, a Modern two-story, flat-roofed, cubic residence.
30	First Congregational Church	First Congregational Church	July 18, 2023 (#100009148)	98 Superior Blvd. 42°12′24″N 83°08′59″W	Wyandotte	
31	First United Methodist Church	First United Methodist Church	August 3, 1982 (#82002918)	16300 Woodward Ave. 42°24′55″N 83°06′11″W	Highland Park	In 1868, a frame chapel for interdenominational services was built behind where the First United Methodist Church currently stands. The site went through different hands, and in 1916, the Methodist congregation built the present Gothic church. In 1956, the original frame chapel behind the present church was demolished. Since 1995, Soul Harvest Ministries has operated from the building.
32	John and Edna Truesdell Fischer Farmstead	John and Edna Truesdell Fischer Farmstead	June 2, 2000 (#00000617)	4896–5228 S. Sheldon Rd. (Canton Township); 42°16′10″N 83°28′36″W	Sheldon	This farmstead includes an 1897 Queen Anne house built by the children of German immigrants, as well as a 1945 ranch house, 18 greenhouses, a boiler house, a modern garage, and the remnants of a barn and silo.
33	Ford River Rouge Complex	Ford River Rouge Complex	June 2, 1978 (#78001516)	3001 Miller Rd. 42°18′08″N 83°09′52″W	Dearborn	This complex is a Ford Motor Company automobile factory complex located along the Rouge River. Construction on the plant began in 1917, and when it was completed in 1928 it had become the largest integrated factory in the world. The Rouge measures 1.5 miles (2.4 km) wide by 1 mile (1.6 km) long, including 93 buildings with nearly 16 million square feet (1.5 km^{2}) of factory floor space.
34	Ford Valve Plant	Ford Valve Plant	August 1, 1995 (#95000866)	235 E. Main St. 42°25′56″N 83°28′40″W	Northville	The Ford Valve Plant was the first of Henry Ford's "Village Industries" factories, designed to bring the economic advantages of industrial jobs to rural communities through the establishment of decentralized, non-disruptive manufacturing plants.
35	Henry Ford Square House	Henry Ford Square House	November 25, 1980 (#80001932)	29835 Beechwood Ave. 42°19′37″N 83°20′07″W	Garden City	The Henry Ford Square House (also known as the Henry Ford Honeymoon House) is a four-room house built by hand by Henry Ford soon after his marriage, using timber cut on the property and finished in the sawmill he operated. Henry's wife Clara drew the plans for the house, and the couple moved in during June 1889, 14 months after they were married.
36	Ford-Bacon House	Ford-Bacon House	December 1, 1997 (#97001476)	45 Vinewood; 42°12′26″N 83°08′54″W	Wyandotte	In 1897, Edward Ford (also the builder of the George P. MacNichol House across the street) hired Malcomson & Higginbotham to design this house for himself and his wife Carrie. Ford lived in the house only a short time, and in 1902, his daughter Mary Ford Bacon and her husband Mark R. Bacon moved in, residing in the house until 1942. The house is now used as the Bacon Memorial District Library.
37	Gibraltar Road – Waterway Canal Bridge	Gibraltar Road – Waterway Canal Bridge	February 10, 2000 (#00000082)	Gibraltar Rd. over Waterway Canal; 42°05′42″N 83°11′26″W	Gibraltar	The Gibraltar Road Bridge is an unusual reinforced-concrete cantilevered-arch bridge. After construction, the Wayne County Road Commissioners noted that "this low sweeping arch bridge is in keeping with its surroundings and is one of the features which make Gibraltar Road so attractive."
38	Grace Evangelical Lutheran Church	Grace Evangelical Lutheran Church	August 3, 1982 (#82002919)	12375 Woodward Ave. 42°23′52″N 83°05′32″W	Highland Park	Grace Evangelical Lutheran Church was originally a mission on the west side of Detroit, and the congregation worshipped in built a frame Victorian Gothic chapel (built for the Highland Park Presbyterian Church congregation) one block south of the current site. The present cathedral was built from 1929 to 1930, and was used by the congregation until 1979, when the Grace Evangelical congregation sold their church building to an Apostolic African-American congregation, the Prayer Temple of Love Cathedral.
39	Greenfield Village and Henry Ford Museum	Greenfield Village and Henry Ford Museum	October 20, 1969 (#69000071)	Bounded by Michigan Ave. on the N, Village Rd. on the S, Southfield Expwy. on the E, and Oakland Blvd. on the W 42°18′16″N 83°13′30″W	Dearborn	The Henry Ford is the nation's "largest indoor-outdoor history museum" complex. Named for its founder, the noted automobile industrialist Henry Ford, and based on his desire to preserve items of historical significance and portray the Industrial Revolution, the property houses a vast array of famous homes, machinery, exhibits, and Americana. It is also known as the Edison Institute or Greenfield Village.
40	Greenmead Farms	Greenmead Farms	March 24, 1972 (#72000672)	38125 Base Line Rd. 42°26′17″N 83°25′05″W	Livonia	Greenmead Farms was originally the farm of Joshua Simmons, who moved to the property in 1825. The farm includes the 1829 North Barn (the first barn built in Livonia) and an 1841 Greek Revival farmhouse. Additional structures, including four mid-19th-century farmhouses, have been moved to the property as the surrounding area has been developed.
41	Grosse Pointe Central Library	Grosse Pointe Central Library	April 21, 2021 (#100006438)	10 Kercheval Ave. 42°23′38″N 82°54′20″W	Grosse Pointe Farms	
42	Grosse Pointe High School	Grosse Pointe High School	May 20, 1993 (#93000429)	11 Grosse Pointe Blvd. 42°23′27″N 82°54′08″W	Grosse Pointe Farms	Grosse Pointe South was added to the Register for its significance in architecture, art, and education. The school anchors one of Grosse Pointe's most historically significant neighborhoods, the Beverly Road Historic District. Grosse Pointe Memorial Presbyterian Church, Christ Church Grosse Pointe, and Richard Elementary School are all within two blocks of the school.
43	Grosse Pointe Memorial Church	Grosse Pointe Memorial Church	December 6, 1993 (#93001351)	16 Lake Shore Dr. 42°23′20″N 82°53′58″W	Grosse Pointe Farms	In 1865, a group of Grosse Pointe residents founded the nondenominational Grosse Pointe Protestant Evangelical Church. In 1920, the congregation reorganized as a Presbyterian church. Truman Handy Newberry and his brother John donated nearly $300,000 to the congregation for a new church building, as a memorial to their parents John and Helen.
44	Grosse Pointe Yacht Club	Grosse Pointe Yacht Club	January 7, 2015 (#14001124)	788 Lake Shore Dr. 42°27′04″N 82°52′22″W	Grosse Pointe Shores	The 18th century Italian Renaissance-style clubhouse was designed by architect Guy Lowell in the 1920s to design the clubhouse. The building combines sun-washed stucco walls and terra cotta tile with a 187-foot bell tower, which also serves as a navigational aid for boaters on Lake St. Clair.
45	Hamtramck Stadium	Hamtramck Stadium	July 31, 2012 (#12000458)	3201 Dan St. 42°23′23″N 83°03′03″W	Hamtramck	Hamtramck Stadium, also known as Roesink Stadium, is one of only 12 remaining Negro league baseball stadiums. It was home to the Detroit Stars of 1930-31, 1933, and 1937. It was also home to the Detroit Wolves who played in 1932.
46	Highland Heights-Stevens' Subdivision Historic District	Highland Heights-Stevens' Subdivision Historic District	February 8, 1988 (#88000050)	Bounded by Woodward Ave., the alley south of E. Buena Vista Ave., Oakland Ave., and the alley south of Massachusetts Ave. 42°23′49″N 83°05′13″W	Highland Park	The Highland Heights-Stevens' Subdivision Historic District is a residential historic district of primarily single-family homes built in the early 20th-century. The houses are fine representation of the variety of American residential architecture in the years 1900–1930. Styles represented include foursquares, bungalows, and various revival styles.
47	Highland Park General Hospital	Highland Park General Hospital	October 31, 1985 (#85003400)	357 Glendale Ave. 42°23′41″N 83°06′19″W	Highland Park	The Highland Park General Hospital is a significant landmark in the history of Highland Park. The hospital was one of the first two institutions established when Highland Park incorporated as a city in 1916. The primary building faces Glendale, and includes the original hospital building, built in 1918, and the attached nurses' residence, built in 1925.
48	Highland Park Plant, Ford Motor Company	Highland Park Plant, Ford Motor Company	February 6, 1973 (#73000961)	15050 Woodward Ave. 42°24′37″N 83°05′40″W	Highland Park	The Highland Park Ford Plant was a production plant for Ford Motor Company The plant was designed by Albert Kahn in 1908 and was opened in 1910. Because of its spacious design, it set the precedent for many factories and production plants built thereafter. In 1913, the Highland Park Ford Plant became the first automobile production facility in the world to implement the assembly line
49	Highland Park Presbyterian Church	Highland Park Presbyterian Church	August 3, 1982 (#82002920)	14 Cortland St. 42°23′48″N 83°05′30″W	Highland Park	The Highland Park Presbyterian Church was established in 1893 as a mission church of the First Presbyterian Church of Detroit. Three years later a small chapel was built on the site of the present church. However, the congregation grew to over two hundred members, and the present building was constructed from 1910 to 1911. The building is now known as the Park United Presbyterian Church.
50	Hull's Trace North Huron River Corduroy Segment	Hull's Trace North Huron River Corduroy Segment	December 13, 2010 (#10001022)	36000 W. Jefferson Ave. 42°02′36″N 83°12′50″W	Brownstown Charter Township	At the beginning of the War of 1812, troops under the command of General William Hull constructed what became known as "Hull's Trace," a 200-mile (320 km) military road running from Urbana, Ohio to Fort Detroit. This corduroy road segment is the only known extant portion of what was the first military road and first federal road in the United States.
51	Jefferson Avenue – Huron River and Harbin Drive – Silver Creek Canal Bridges	Jefferson Avenue – Huron River and Harbin Drive – Silver Creek Canal Bridges	February 10, 2000 (#00000080)	Jefferson Ave. over Huron R.; Harbin Dr. over Silver Creek Canal; 42°02′32″N 83°12′52″W	Brownstown Charter Township	This listing comprises two separate bridges: the Jefferson Avenue Bridge, which carries W. Jefferson Avenue over the Huron River and the smaller Harbin Drive Bridge spanning the Silver Creek Canal. The Jefferson Avenue Bridge connects Wayne County to Berlin Charter Township in Monroe County and is also listed on the NRHP listings in Monroe County article.
52	William and Margot Kessler House	William and Margot Kessler House	September 30, 2013 (#13000801)	1013 Cadieux Road; 42°23′00″N 82°54′55″W	Grosse Pointe Park	The William and Margot Kessler House was constructed in 1959 by architect William Kessler for himself, his wife Margot, and his family. The most dramatic features of the house are the saw-tooth roof and the textured brick privacy fence that creates an enclosed garden along the front of the house.
53	Orrin and Roxanne Fairman Kinyon House	Orrin and Roxanne Fairman Kinyon House	June 9, 2000 (#00000649)	7675 N. Ridge Rd. 42°20′30″N 83°31′43″W	Canton	This house is a Greek Revival farmhouse, of post and beam construction, sided with wood and sitting on a stone foundation. It was built in 1850 by Orrin Kinyon, the son of one of Canton Township's original settlers.
54	Charles J. and Ingrid V. (Frendberg) Koebel House	Charles J. and Ingrid V. (Frendberg) Koebel House	December 8, 2009 (#09001068)	203 Cloverly Road; 42°24′17″N 82°53′57″W	Grosse Pointe Farms	This Modernist house was the first commission for the father-and-son firm of Eliel and Eero Saarinen. The house integrates the exterior architecture, sculpture, interior design, lighting, and furnishings.
55	LeMoyne Gardens		August 31, 2026 (#100013334)	Generally bounded by Henry Ruff Rd, Liberty St, Burton St, Annapolis Ave, Pine St, Pierce St, Kenwood Ave, and Andover St; 42°16′38″N 83°20′09″W	Inkster	Urban Renewal-era Resources in the United States MPS.
56	Lilley Road – Lower Rouge River Bridge	Lilley Road – Lower Rouge River Bridge	February 10, 2000 (#00000078)	Lilley Rd. over Lower Rouge R. 42°16′46″N 83°27′24″W	Canton Township	This bridge was originally built in 1923–1924 for installation where Telegraph Road crossed a branch of the Rouge River just north of Warren Road. However, Telegraph Road was soon widened, and the bridge was removed and in 1933 installed at the Lilley Road crossing of the Lower Rouge River.
57	Lincoln Park Post Office	Lincoln Park Post Office	February 4, 2004 (#03001551)	1335 Southfield Rd. 42°15′01″N 83°10′44″W	Lincoln Park	The design of this 1938 building, created by supervising architect of the treasury Louis A. Simon, was used for a number of other Depression-era post offices in the state of Michigan.
58	George P. MacNichol House	George P. MacNichol House	May 24, 1984 (#84001859)	2610 Biddle Ave. 42°12′27″N 83°08′56″W	Wyandotte	In 1896, Edward Ford (also the builder of the Ford-Bacon House across the street) hired Malcomson & Higginbotham to design this home as wedding gift for his daughter Laura on her marriage to George P. MacNichol. The house is currently used as the Wyandotte Historical Museum.
59	Marx House	Marx House	August 13, 1976 (#76001043)	2630 Biddle Ave. 42°12′26″N 83°08′56″W	Wyandotte	The Marx House was built in approximately 1862 for Warren Isham. In the next 60 years, the house went through six owners, including Charles W. Thomas, Wyandotte's first druggist, and Dr. Theophilus Langlois, a prominent physician who served as Wyandotte's mayor for two terms and contributed to other civic projects in the city. In 1921, the house was purchased by John Marx, the city attorney and scion of a local brewery owner.
60	Grace Ingersoll McGraw House		February 16, 2023 (#100007934)	17315 East Jefferson Ave; 42°23′04″N 82°54′27″W	Grosse Pointe	
61	McKinley Elementary School	McKinley Elementary School	November 27, 2017 (#100001840)	640 Plum St. 42°11′46″N 83°09′31″W	Wyandotte	In 1938, the Wyandotte school board hired architect Carl R. Jensen to design this building. The school opened in March 1940, and was used until 2009, when declining enrollment led the school board to close it. As of 2017, the building was being rehabilitated for housing.
62	Medbury's-Grove Lawn Subdivisions Historic District	Medbury's-Grove Lawn Subdivisions Historic District	February 8, 1988 (#88000049)	Roughly bounded by Hamilton Ave., the alley south of Louise Ave., Woodward Ave., and the alley south of Puritan Ave. 42°24′46″N 83°06′28″W	Highland Park	Medbury's-Grove Lawn Subdivisions Historic District is a residential historic district, built up primarily in the 1910s and 1920s. It features a variety of architectural styles that were popular at the time. Bungalows and bungalow-style houses with Craftsman or colonial details predominate, and, in fact, the neighborhood is significant for containing Michigan's most outstanding collection of single-family bungalows and bungalow-style homes. However, foursquare, Colonial Revival, and English cottage homes are also present within the neighborhood.
63	Northville Historic District	Northville Historic District	July 31, 1972 (#72000673)	Bounded roughly by Cady, Rogers, and Randolph Sts. 42°25′54″N 83°29′03″W	Northville	This district is located in the heart of old Northville, and is primarily residential, although the 73 contributing structures include several commercial buildings and a church. The majority of district consists of Gothic Revival houses constructed between 1860 and 1880.
64	Norwayne Historic District	Norwayne Historic District	July 9, 2013 (#13000479)	Generally bounded by Palmer, Wildwood, Glenwood & Merriman Rds., Wayne County Lower Rouge Pkwy. 42°17′32″N 83°21′55″W	Westland	The Norwayne subdivision was originally built in 1942 by the National Housing Agency to house workers employed at nearby defense industry plants, including the Willow Run Bomber Plant. The project originally had 1189 residential buildings, a Management Office, a fire station, a church, three elementary schools, Norris Jefferson and Lincoln and several commercial properties. Streets in the subdivision are primarily curvilinear, following the Federal Housing Administration guidelines published in the late 1930s.
65	Palmer Park Boulevard Apartments District	Palmer Park Boulevard Apartments District	January 22, 1992 (#91001983)	1981, 2003 and 2025 W. McNichols Rd. 42°25′02″N 83°07′15″W	Highland Park	The Palmer Park Boulevard Apartments District is a collection of three apartment building located at 1981, 2003 and 2025 West McNichols Road. These three adjacent buildings were all built in the same time period (the mid-1920s), all were designed by the same architect (Richard H. Marr), and all share a uniform height, setback, and general plan.
66	Parke Lane Road – Thorofare Canal Bridge	Parke Lane Road – Thorofare Canal Bridge	February 4, 2000 (#00000043)	Parke Lane Rd. over Thorofare Ch. 42°10′05″N 83°08′38″W	Grosse Ile	The Parke Lane Road-Thorofare Canal Bridge is of a rare cantilevered concrete arch design. The traditional arch bridge design requires a complete arch. In contrast, the cantilevered arch design is divided into two structurally independent half-arches which are each cantilevered from one side with a slab suspended between the two cantilevered sections.
67	John and Eliza Barr Patterson House	John and Eliza Barr Patterson House	June 9, 2000 (#00000647)	6205 N. Ridge Rd. 42°19′34″N 83°31′40″W	Canton	In 1844, John Patterson married Eliza Barr; the couple purchased another plot of land and built this Greek Revival house. The farm remained in the family until 1999. The grounds still contain rose, daylily, and peony plantings that date from the late 19th and early 20th centuries.
68	Redford Township District No. 5 School	Redford Township District No. 5 School	March 28, 1997 (#97000279)	18499 Beech Daly Rd. 42°25′28″N 83°17′50″W	Redford	This school was built using stock plans available free of charge from the state superintendent of public instruction, and is a rare surviving unremodeled example of a school featuring every detail of the original plans. It is still used as the John C. Raeside Administration Building of the Redford Union School District.
69	Pere Gabriel Richard Elementary School	Pere Gabriel Richard Elementary School	July 22, 1994 (#94000752)	176 McKinley Ave. 42°23′43″N 82°54′18″W	Grosse Pointe Farms	This school, named for Father Gabriel Richard (1767–1832), was designed by Robert O. Derrick in the French Renaissance style. It first opened its doors in September 1930, with a population of 389 students.
70	Plymouth High School and Central Grade School	Plymouth High School and Central Grade School	September 18, 2026 (#100013409)	650 Church St. 42°22′25″N 83°28′02″W	Plymouth	
71	Rosedale Gardens Historic District	Rosedale Gardens Historic District	July 19, 2010 (#10000478)	Arden St. to Hubbard St. between Plymouth Rd. and West Chicago St. 42°21′54″N 83°21′29″W	Livonia	Rosedale Gardens was platted by the Shelden Land Company in the 1920s. The company modeled the development on Rosedale Park in Detroit. The first wood-sided houses were built in 1925. When the Great Depression hit, construction stopped for a time; the developer bricked over existing homes, and continued with brick construction when building resumed later in the 1930s.
72	St. Florian Historic District	St. Florian Historic District	September 13, 1984 (#84001865)	Roughly bounded by Joseph Campau Ave., Holbrook Ave., Dequindre, Norwalk, Lumpkin, and Yemans Sts. 42°23′41″N 83°03′42″W	Hamtramck	In the early part of the 20th century, the Roman Catholic Archdiocese of Detroit recognized the need for a church to serve Polish residents, of Hamtramck, many of whom flocked to the city to work at the Dodge automotive factory. St. Florian parish was established in 1907, and a church was consecrated in 1909. As the parish grew, congregants amassed over $500,000 to build a second, grander church. This one was consecrated on October 21, 1928.
73	St. James Episcopal Church	St. James Episcopal Church	November 19, 1971 (#71000434)	25150 E. River Rd. 42°07′29″N 83°08′33″W	Grosse Ile	St. James Episcopal Church was constructed in 1867. Funds to build the church came primarily from the estate of Lisette Denison Forth, a freed slave who had willed the bulk of her savings to the purpose of constructing an Episcopalian house of worship. The red doors of the structure are dedicated to the memory and benevolence of Lisette Denison Forth.
74	Saint Paul Catholic Church Complex	Saint Paul Catholic Church Complex	June 17, 1994 (#94000621)	157 Lake Shore Dr. 42°23′41″N 82°53′37″W	Grosse Pointe Farms	The St. Paul Roman Catholic parish was the first Catholic parish in the Grosse Pointes, organized in 1835 but with roots back to the 1790s. The present church building, the third for the parish, was designed by Harry J. Rill and was completed in 1899[2] at a cost of just over $23,000. The church is constructed of brick and stone, and is designed in the French Gothic Revival style, an unusual class of architecture in the Detroit area.
75	Carl E. and Alice Candler Schmidt House	Carl E. and Alice Candler Schmidt House	August 24, 2005 (#05000909)	301 Lake Shore Rd. 42°24′18″N 82°53′18″W	Grosse Pointe Farms	Carl E. Schmidt was a tanner with a successful Detroit business; he was also a close friend and political advisor to Hazen Pingree, who served as both mayor of Detroit and governor of Michigan. Schmidt and his wife Alice built this Shingle-style house in 1909.
76	Sheldon Inn	Sheldon Inn	June 2, 2000 (#00000618)	44134 Michigan Ave. (Canton Township); 42°16′31″N 83°28′28″W	Sheldon	The Sheldon Inn is a two-story Greek Revival apartment building, previously used as a single-family home and a travelers' inn. The Inn was built by Timothy and Rachel Sheldon, one of the first families to settle in Canton Township, in 1825.
77	George and Mary Pine Smith House	George and Mary Pine Smith House	June 2, 2000 (#00000619)	3704 S. Sheldon Rd. (Canton Township); 42°16′47″N 83°28′37″W	Sheldon	The land this house sits on was first farmed by William Smith of England, who purchased 80 acres (320,000 m^{2}) of land in 1830. William Smith and his wife Mary Collins Smith raised seven children on this farm, establishing a long line of Smiths farming in Canton Township. William's grandson George Smith Jr. married Mary Pine, and in 1904, George Jr. and Mary Smith spent $2,058.76 to build the house that now sits on the property. Although the present acreage is small, outbuildings on the property give the feel of the old farmstead and the wooded edges isolate the house from the surrounding modern developments.
78	South Pointe Drive – Frenchman's Creek Bridge	South Pointe Drive – Frenchman's Creek Bridge	February 18, 2000 (#00000117)	South Pointe Dr. over Frenchman's Creek; 42°06′09″N 83°10′20″W	Grosse Ile	This bridge designed is a 40-foot (12 m) concrete T-beam bridge, completed in 1939 using labor from the Works Progress Administration.
79	Springwells Park Historic District	Springwells Park Historic District	April 28, 2015 (#14001046)	Rotunda Dr., the Michigan Central Railroad line, and Greenfield and Eastham Rds. 42°18′29″N 83°11′38″W	Dearborn	This neighborhood was developed by the Ford Foundation, and includes single family houses and duplexes, apartment buildings, a shopping center, and multiple parks. It is distinguished by its gently curving streets with numerous cul-de-sacs.
80	Starkweather School	Starkweather School	November 7, 2016 (#16000762)	550 N. Holbrook St. 42°22′42″N 83°27′34″W	Plymouth	The 1927 Starkweather School is the only school from its time still extant in Plymouth, and the only school in Plymouth designed by Malcomson and Higginbotham, who designed numerous schools for the Detroit school district.
81	William B. and Mary Chase Stratton House	William B. and Mary Chase Stratton House	May 24, 1984 (#84001867)	938 Three Mile Dr. 42°22′43″N 82°55′24″W	Grosse Pointe Park	The William B. and Mary Chase Stratton House was built in 1927 as a collaborative venture between husband-and-wife William Buck Stratton (an architect) and Mary Chase Perry Stratton (a ceramicist and founder of Pewabic Pottery). The house design was heavily influenced by the Arts and Crafts Movement, and the Strattons used natural material, texture, and color to create an original and masterly composition.
82	Trinity United Methodist Church	Trinity United Methodist Church	August 3, 1982 (#82002921)	13100 Woodward Ave. 42°24′05″N 83°05′37″W	Highland Park	Trinity United Methodist was built by the Cass United Methodist Church of Detroit as a mission church to serve membership in Highland Park who lived too far to travel the eight miles (13 km) to Cass United. It is now known as the New Mt. Moriah Baptist Church.
83	Ephraim and Emma Woodworth Truesdell House	Ephraim and Emma Woodworth Truesdell House	April 2, 2003 (#03000174)	1224 Haggerty Rd. 42°17′56″N 83°26′54″W	Canton	The structure is significant as one of the most finely crafted houses in the township, as well as its association with one of the most important families in the area.
84	United States Post Office Plymouth Station	United States Post Office Plymouth Station	July 24, 2024 (#100010627)	860 Penniman Ave. 42°22′18″N 83°28′11″W	Plymouth	Now the Westborn Market.
85	US 12 Bridges	US 12 Bridges	February 4, 2000 (#00000041)	US 12 over I-94 and westbound I-94 ramp 42°19′35″N 83°09′39″W	Dearborn	The US 12 Bridges are two bridges carrying US 12 over Interstate 94 and the westbound I-94 ramp. The bridges were constructed in 1948-49 as part of the "Crosstown Expressway," which had been planned to carry traffic through Detroit since the 1920s.
86	Carlton D. Wall House	Carlton D. Wall House	June 28, 1994 (#94000620)	12305 Beck Rd. 42°22′16″N 83°30′42″W	Plymouth	The Carlton D. Wall House is an elaborate Usonian home designed by Frank Lloyd Wright in 1941. It is built as a series of hexagons radiating from a central space.
87	Waltz Road – Huron River Bridge	Waltz Road – Huron River Bridge	February 10, 2000 (#00000081)	Waltz Rd. over Huron R. 42°09′40″N 83°24′10″W	Huron Township	The Waltz Road – Huron River Bridge was constructed in 1924 by the Wayne County Road Commission replacing a previous footbridge that had been erected over the Huron River to allow local children to attend school. The span consists of two identical seven-panel, camelback Pratt pony trusses with sidewalks attached to the outside of each truss.
88	West Jefferson Avenue – Rouge River Bridge	West Jefferson Avenue – Rouge River Bridge	February 10, 2000 (#00000079)	W. Jefferson Ave. over Rouge R. 42°16′50″N 83°07′44″W	River Rouge	Built in 1922, this "Chicago city type of single trunnion, double-leaf bascule bridge" replaced a narrow swing bridge, allowing the Rouge River to be widened to provide freighter access to the Ford River Rouge Complex. The Rouge River marks the boundary between the cities of River Rouge and Detroit, and this listing is also included in the List of Registered Historic Places in Detroit, Michigan.
89	Wilson Barn	Wilson Barn	December 12, 1973 (#73000962)	NE corner of Middlebelt and W. Chicago Rds. 42°21′53″N 83°19′55″W	Livonia	This barn was originally constructed by Ira Wilson in 1888; in 1919 the barn burned and he built the present structure on the foundations of the earlier barn. Wilson eventually established a million-dollar dairy, creamery, and trucking business, the Ira Wilson & Sons Dairy, and served for two terms as Wayne County sheriff.
90	John T. Woodhouse House	John T. Woodhouse House	July 20, 2005 (#05000715)	33 Old Brook Ln. 42°24′24″N 82°53′18″W	Grosse Pointe Farms	The John T. Woodhouse House is a private house designed by George D. Mason.
91	Wyandotte Odd Fellows Temple	Wyandotte Odd Fellows Temple	July 16, 2009 (#09000527)	81 Chestnut St. 42°12′19″N 83°08′58″W	Wyandotte	The Wyandotte Odd Fellows Temple was built in 1911 by the Wyandotte chapter of the Independent Order of Odd Fellows, a fraternal organization. In 1943, the building was purchased by the Fraternal Order of Free and Accepted Masons. The Masons used the building for over 50 years, after which it was used as a church; in 2008 the city of Wyandotte purchased the building to preserve the structure.
92	Malcolm X House	Malcolm X House	November 29, 2021 (#100007205)	4336 Williams St. 42°16′39″N 83°18′46″W	Inkster	

== Former listings ==
	Name on the Register	Image	Date listed	Date removed	Location	City or town	Description
1	Mellus Newspapers Building	Mellus Newspapers Building	July 20, 2005 (#05000716)	July 24, 2024	1661 Fort St. 42°15′06″N 83°10′31″W	Lincoln Park	In 1941, William S. Mellus constructed this building to house his Lincoln Parker newspaper. The company remained in the building until a 1986 merger with Heritage Newspapers. The building was eventually purchased by the Lincoln Park Downtown Development Authority, and was demolished on May 13, 2010.
2	Dodge Mansion	Dodge Mansion	June 19, 1971 (#71001096)	November 30, 1977	12 Lakeshore Dr. 42°23′11″N 82°54′04″W	Grosse Pointe Farms	The Dodge Mansion, also known as Rose Terrace, was built by Anna Thompson Dodge (widow of Horace Elgin Dodge) and her then-husband, Hugh Dillman, in 1931-34. It was located on the site of an earlier mansion built by Anna and Horace Dodge, also known as Rose Terrace. The 1931 version of Rose Terrace was an enormous, 42,000 square feet French-style chateau overlooking Lake St. Clair. Anna Dodge lived at Rose Terrace until her death in 1970, and the house was demolished in 1976.

== See also ==
- List of Michigan State Historic Sites in Wayne County, Michigan
- List of National Historic Landmarks in Michigan
- National Register of Historic Places listings in Michigan
- Listings in neighboring counties: Macomb, Monroe, Oakland, Washtenaw
