= Springwells Park Historic District =

Historic district in Michigan, United States

- U.S. National Register of Historic Places
- U.S. Historic district
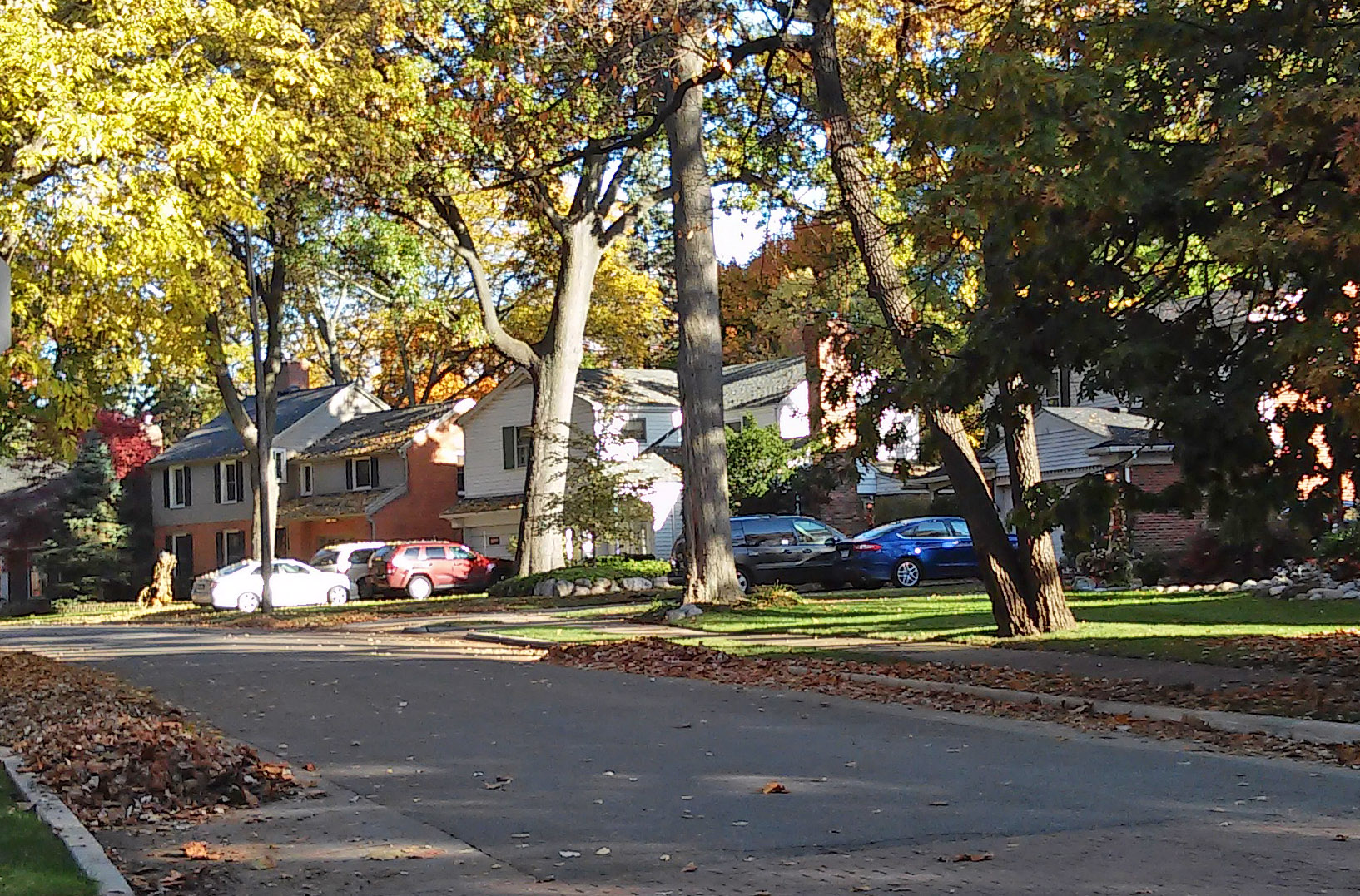
- Interactive map
- Location: Rotunda Dr., the Michigan Central Railroad line, and Greenfield and Eastham Rds. Dearborn, Michigan
- Coordinates: 42°18′29″N 83°11′38″W
- Architect: Giffels & Vallet, Inc., and L. Rossetti
- Architectural style: Colonial Revival
- NRHP reference No.: 14001046
- Added to NRHP: April 28, 2015

The Springwells Park Historic District is a historic residential neighborhood located in Dearborn, Michigan and bounded by Rotunda Drive, the Michigan Central Railroad line, and Greenfield and Eastham Roads. The district was listed on the National Register of Historic Places in 2015.

== History ==
This area was once part of a ribbon farm along the Rouge River. In 1914, Gustav Zanger purchased the property with the intent of transferring ownership to the Detroit Zoo. When the zoo decided to establish itself in Royal Oak instead, Henry Ford offered to buy the property. The property was sold to Ford in 1927. Ford donated the land to the Ford Foundation, and in 1938 the foundation decided to develop the land in to a residential subdivision.

The entire area and divided into five separate subdivisions and designed as a unit. The first subdivision, including the shopping center at the southeast corner of the neighborhood, was platted in 1939. Development was underway in the first subdivision by 1940, and the second was platted. The third and fourth followed in 1941, and by the advent of World War II 60% of the lots had been developed. Immediately after the war another 30% were developed, and the final ten percent of houses were constructed between 1960 and 1988. The fifth area was never platted, and is not included in this historic district. It was eventually sold and developed as an upscale golf course community.

== Description ==
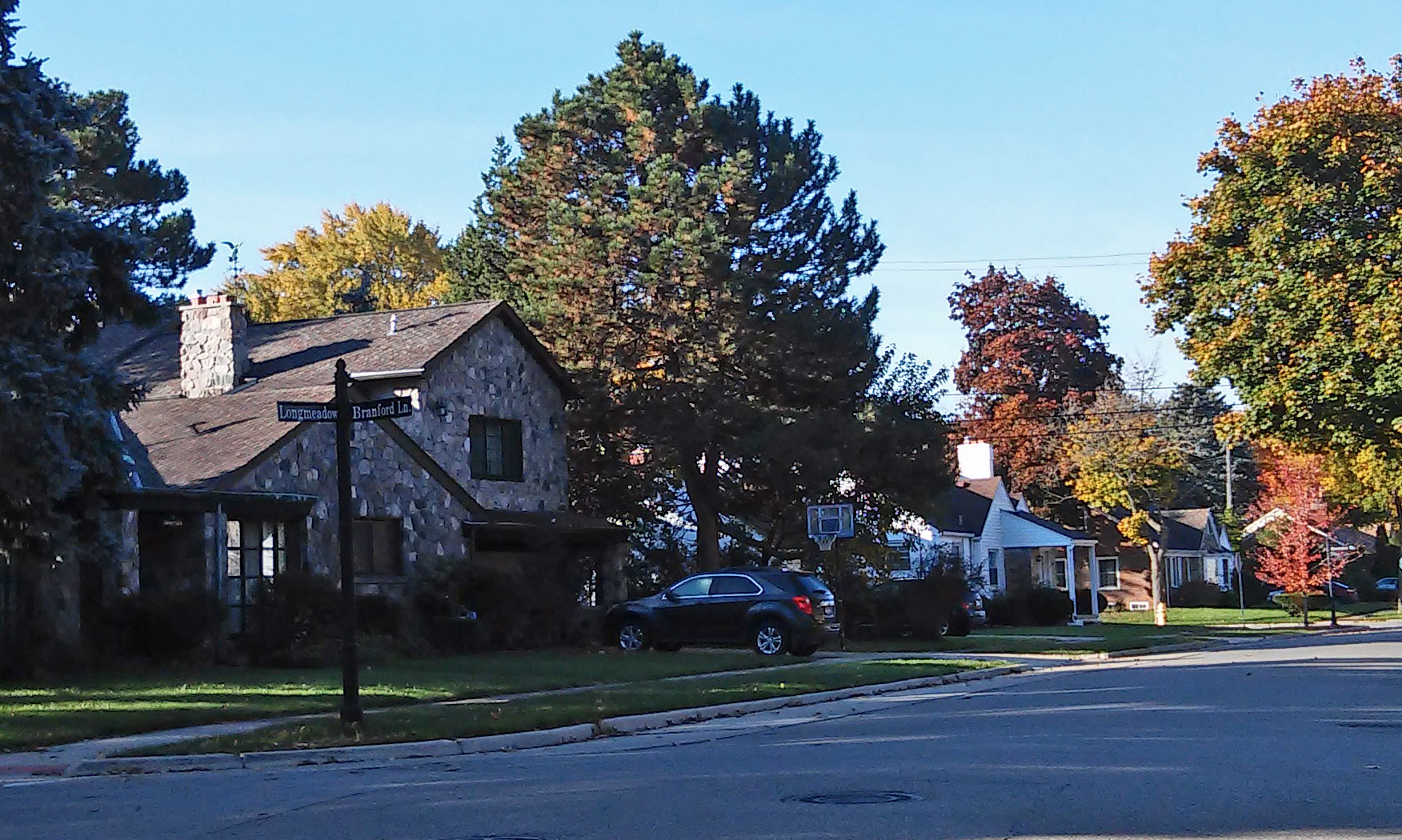
Streetscape

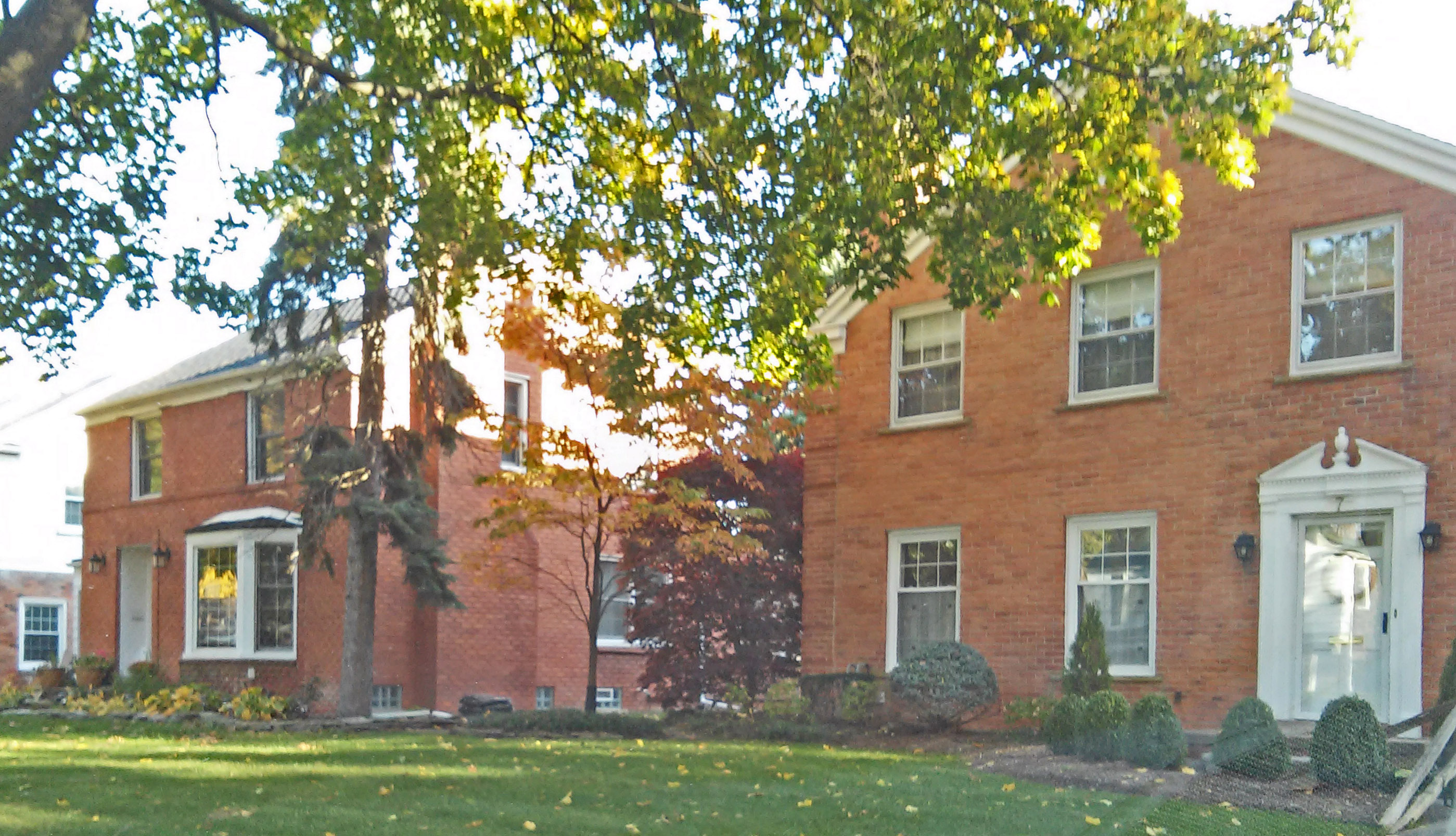
Houses

The Springwells Park neighborhood is platted into lots along gently curving streets that follow the terrain, with numerous cul-de-sacs. Mature trees are located throughout the neighborhood, and interior parks located in the center of the blocks. Structures in the district include single family homes, duplexes, townhouses, and terrace apartment houses, as well as a shopping center. Structures all share Colonial Revival design elements and similar exterior materials.

There are four hundred four contributing houses and duplexes in the neighborhood (and eight noncontributing houses), fifteen contributing apartment buildings (and twenty non-contributing apartment buildings) a shopping center with a two contributing, and two non-contributing buildings, and seven contributing parks. The shopping center is located at the southeast corner of the district, and the contributing apartment buildings are located to the west of the shopping center on the south portion of the district. Parks are equally spaced throughout the neighborhood; all but one (Bennington Park) are on the interior of the blocks.

Each individual house is unique, but all of the houses and duplexes are one, one-and-a-half, or two stories tall. All have Colonial Revival details and gable roofs. Exterior materials include brick, stone, clapboard, and combinations thereof. Most garages are attached, except in the northern sections of the neighborhood. The single-family house types include one-and-a-half-story Cape Cods, two-story center entrance, one-and-half-story cottages, and one-story ranch houses.

The duplexes are located in the north section of the neighborhood. Like the single-family homes, the duplexes vary in form but are constructed in similar styles and using similar materials. Many are two-story brick-clad houses, some with gable fronts; others have clapboard on the second floors or large projecting bays. The townhouse buildings are all similar, with adjacent portions of the buildings alternately set forward and recessed. All have two-story red brick walls and hip roofs covered with concrete tiles. The terrace apartment buildings are U-shaped, with center entrances and cupolas on top.

== See also ==
- National Register of Historic Places listings in Wayne County, Michigan
