= John and Emma Lacey Eberts House =

Historic house in Michigan, United States

- U.S. National Register of Historic Places
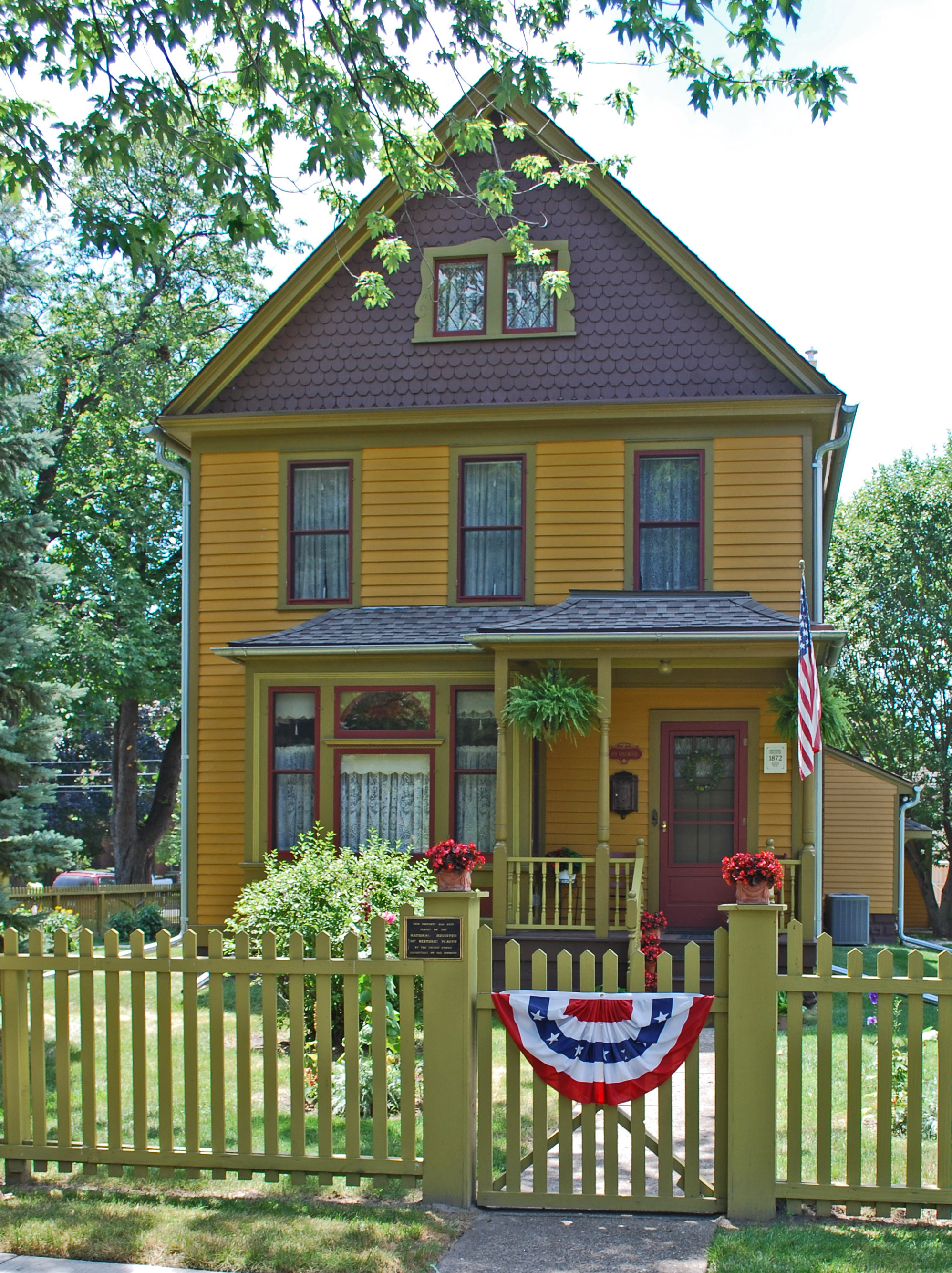

- Location within Michigan Location within the United States
- Interactive map
- Location: 109 Vinewood Avenue, Wyandotte, Michigan
- Coordinates: 42°12′27″N 83°9′2″W
- Built: 1872
- Architect: Raphael R. Thomas
- Architectural style: Queen Anne
- NRHP reference No.: 09000524
- Added to NRHP: July 16, 2009

The John and Emma Lacey Eberts House is a private house located at 109 Vinewood Avenue in Wyandotte, Michigan. It was listed on the National Register of Historic Places in 2009.

== History ==
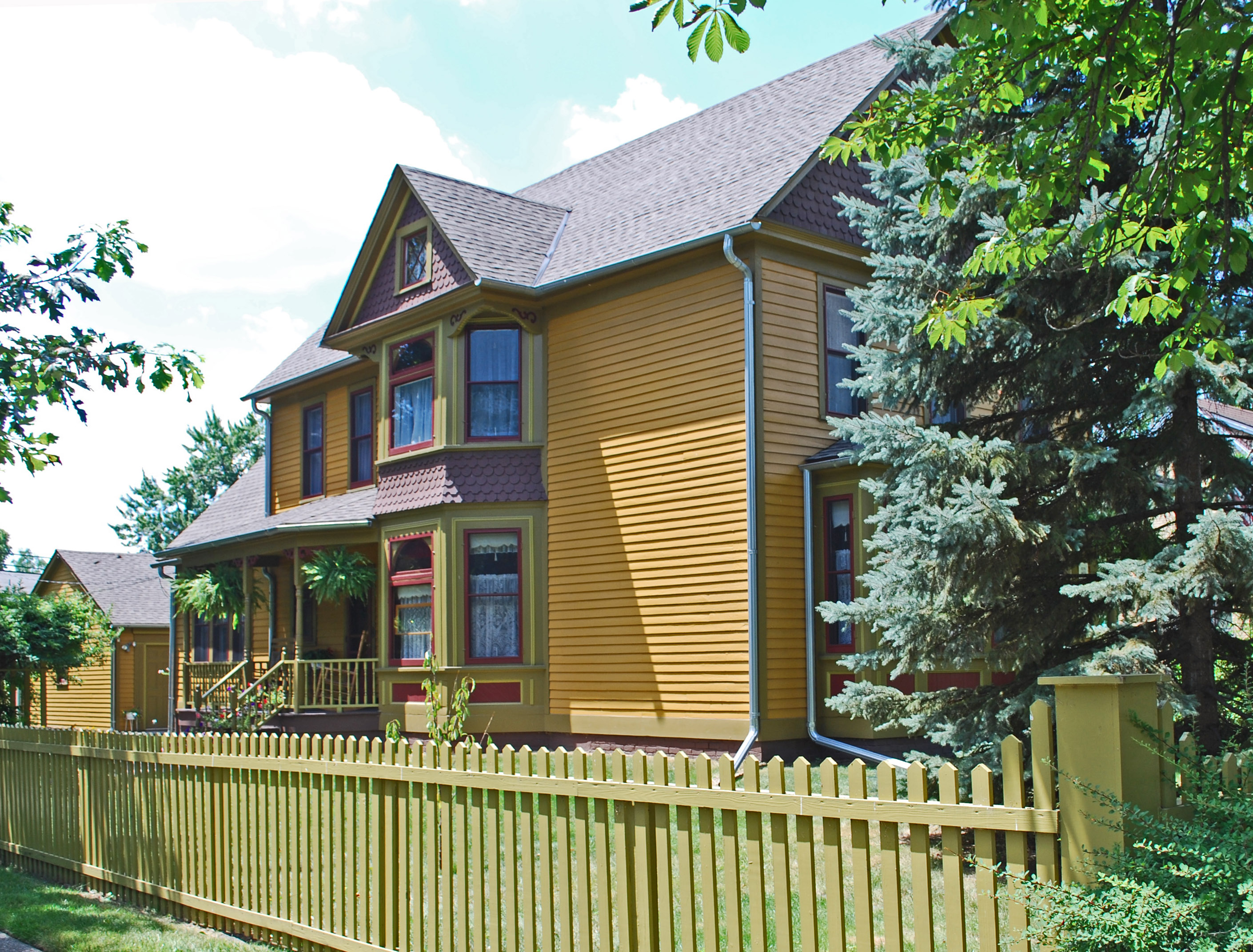
Side elevation of house

John Eberts Jr. was born in 1843 in Detroit. In 1870, he purchased two lots in Wyandotte where this house now stands. In 1872 he married Emma Lacey, and that same year the couple hired Raphael R. Thomas, a cousin of Emma's, to build this house. The couple moved into the house in late December of the same year. They raised five children in the home (Edith, Elsie, Harry, Frank, and Walter), and John Eberts started a coal business supplying homeowners in the area.

In 1892, the house was extensively rebuilt, adding a Queen Anne finish to the exterior. By that time, John Eberts had retired from the coal business and begun other business ventures. In 1895, Harry Eberts re-purchased his father's coal business, and was soon joined by his brother Frank and then Walter. In 1909, both Walter and Frank were still living in this home with their parents. John and Emma Eberts occupied this house until their respective deaths: John in 1929 and Emma in 1941. After that time, the house passed to their daughters Edith and Elsie, who occupied it until their deaths in 1956 and 1962, respectively.

In 1965, the Eberts family sold the house to Ralph Lubaway and his wife Wilma, who raised eleven children in the house. The Lubaway family owned the house until 2005. In 2005, the city of Wyandotte purchased the house with the intent of demolishing it. However, recognizing the historic value, the city sold it as a restoration project. In 2006, the Blankenship/Granzeier family purchased the house and completely restored it.

In 2013, the house was sold to the Martin family, who reside there to this day.

== Description ==
The John and Emma Lacey Eberts House is a two-story gable-front Queen Anne structure clad with clapboard and shingling. The front facade has a small turned-post entry porch with a three-section bay window. The upper-story windows are double hung one-over-ones in plain frames. The tall front gable is finished with wood shingles, and contains a paired window with a decorative board frame surround. The side elevation features another small turned post entry porch and a two-story, slant-sided bay window with gabled top, added to the house in approximately 1900–1912. The bay area between the lower and upper windows is shingled. A single-story ell at the rear of the house contains the kitchen.

On the interior of the house, the main floor contains an entry foyer, a large living room with a decorative Arts and Crafts fireplace, a large dining room, a half-bath and small "alcove," and a large kitchen with separate "kitchen nook" at the rear. On the second floor, there is a large master bedroom with a separate small nursery, and three other mid-sized bedrooms. The attic is open and unfinished. The interior throughout contains the original wood trim, window frames, doors, baseboards and moldings. The pine flooring and wooden staircase is also likely original.
