= First Congregational Church (Wyandotte, Michigan) =

- U.S. National Register of Historic Places
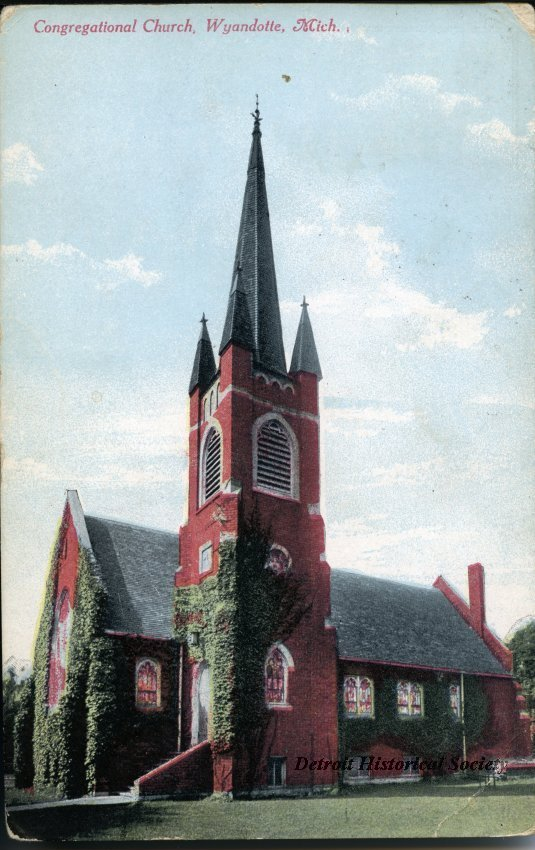
- First Congregational Church in 1912
- Interactive map
- Location: 98 Superior Blvd. Wyandotte, Michigan
- Coordinates: 42°12′24″N 83°8′59″W
- Built: 1903
- Built by: William Wright Company, Lacy and Loeffler, Harry Stoddard
- Architect: Wells D. Butterfield
- Architectural style: Late Gothic Revival
- NRHP reference No.: 100009148
- Added to NRHP: July 18, 2023

The First Congregational Church is a church building located at 98 Superior Boulevard in Wyandotte, Michigan. It was listed on the National Register of Historic Places in 2023.

== History ==
At the time Wyandotte was chartered as a city in 1867 churches of five different denominations existed in the city. In 1892 two ministers, Joshua Stansfield of the First Methodist church and the Peter E. Nichol of the First Presbyterian, each preached against the sin of dancing. In objection some members of each congregation walked out; twenty-nine of them immediately formed the First Congregational Church. The new congregation began meeting in an old school house. By 1902, the congregation had grown to 200 members. A location for a permanent church was chosen, and the congregation hired architect Wells D. Butterfield to design the building. Construction began in August 1902 and the church was dedicated in June 1903.

The Congregational Church constructed a parsonage behind the sanctuary in 1913. An adjoining fellowship hall was added in 1927.

== Description ==
The First Congregational Church complex was constructed in three stages: the 1903 church, the 1927 fellowship hall, and the 1913 parsonage (now a private residence). The church is a Late Gothic Revival building clad in reddish-brown brick, with a limestone foundation and limestone trim. The sanctuary is rectangular and measures thirty-four feet by seventy-six feet. The main façade contains a large stained glass window. The entryway is within a square bell tower topped with a spire which projects from one corner. The sanctuary is topped with a steep gabled roof.

The Fellowship Hall is a rectangular building adjacent to the church, connecting internally through the bell tower. The hall is a brick building. The front façade is divided into two bays by three buttresses topped with limestone. Each bay contains a double arched window. The parsonage is located behind the church, and is a 2-1/2 story, L-shaped vernacular Queen Anne style house. The first floor is clad in brick and the second in vinyl siding. It has a steeply pitched side-gable front section and a recessed entry porch.
