= Benjamin and Mary Ann Bradford House =

Historic house in Michigan, United States

- U.S. National Register of Historic Places
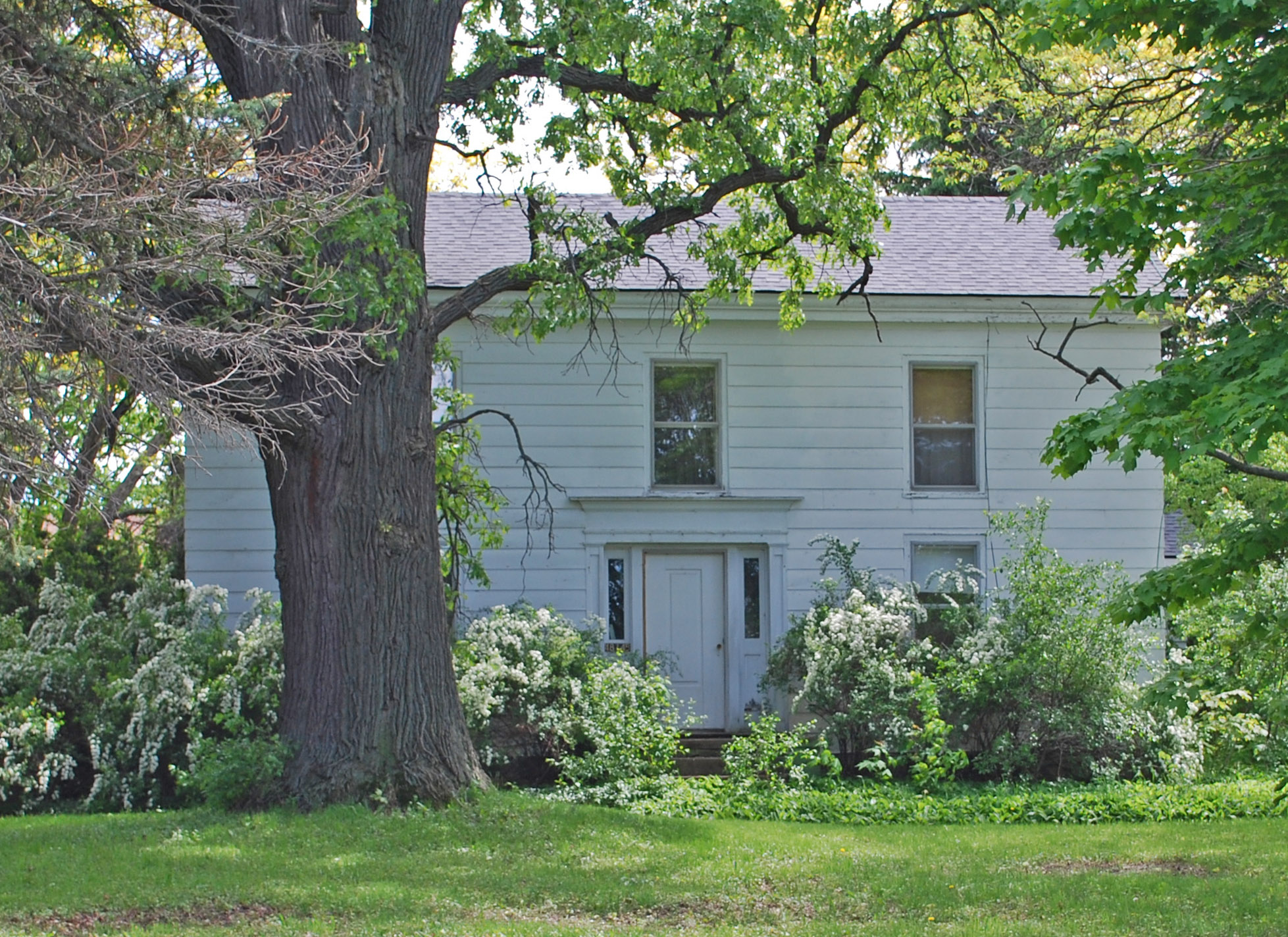

- Location within Michigan Location within the United States
- Interactive map showing the location of Benjamin and Mary Ann Bradford House
- Location: 48145 Warren Rd.
- Nearest city: Canton, Michigan
- Coordinates: 42°20′7″N 83°30′54″W
- Area: less than one acre
- Built: 1860
- Architectural style: Greek Revival
- MPS: Canton Township MPS
- NRHP reference No.: 00000648
- Added to NRHP: June 09, 2000

The Benjamin and Mary Ann Bradford House is a private house located at 48145 Warren Road in Canton, Michigan. It was listed on the National Register of Historic Places in 2000.

== History ==
In 1825, Moses Bradford moved to Canton Township from Monroe County, New York, one of the first settlers to stake a claim in the area. The following year, Aruna and Mary Bradford, Moses's parents, followed their son to Canton Township. On arrival, they bought the property this house now sits on. Aruna Bradford purchased more land during the following years, and in 1835 sold the parcel where this house sits to their other son, Benjamin. Apparently the Bradfords were engaged in dairy farming, as the 1860 agricultural census reports the farm producing 1,500 pounds (680 kg) of butter and 2,000 pounds (910 kg) of cheese. In 1860, Benjamin built the house that now stands on the property; it remained in the Bradford family until 1911. The house is significant not just because of its association with one of the township's pioneering families, but also because its fine construction reflects the increasing wealth of the early pioneering families in the area.

== Description ==
The Benjamin and Mary Ann Bradford House is a two-story Greek Revival structure with a symmetrical front facade and side gables. The house sits on a fieldstone foundation, and the original clapboard is covered with aluminum siding. The front door is flanked by pilasters and sidelights, and concrete steps lead to the door. A small addition with glassed-in porch is constructed on the rear of the building, and a second small addition is on the west. The roofline has a wide cornice with returns and the roof is covered with diamond shingles. Evidence of farm outbuildings can still be seen around the house.

== See also ==
- Canton Township MPS
- Canton Charter Township, Michigan
