= Cadieux School =

- U.S. National Register of Historic Places
- Interactive map
- Location: 389 Saint Clair Ave. Grosse Pointe, Michigan
- Coordinates: 42°23′02″N 82°54′43″W
- Built: 1906
- Architect: Stratton and Baldwin, Joseph E. Mills and Son
- Architectural style: Classical Revival
- NRHP reference No.: 100008912
- Added to NRHP: April 28, 2023

The Cadieux School is a former school building located at 389 Saint Clair Avenue in Grosse Pointe, Michigan. It was listed on the National Register of Historic Places in 2023.

== History ==
The first school districts in Grosse Pointe Township were established in the 1840s, and by 1860 the township had six school districts and one fractional district. District No. 1 had a frame school located at Jefferson and Balfour; in the late 1860s the district constructed a new brick school on Jefferson. Near the end of the 19th century, the population of Grosse Pointe increased as the area became less rural and more suburban. In 1901, with their Jefferson school at capacity, District No. 1 announced plans to construct a new schoolhouse on Saint Clair Avenue. In 1902, the district hired architect Frank C. Baldwin of the Detroit firm Stratton and Baldwin to design the building. However, the project was delayed due to the need to issue bonds to support the increased cost of construction, and work on the school was not begun until March 1906. The eight-room school opened in October 1906 with three teachers and 96 students; the building was named after the Cadieuxs, one of Grosse Pointe's founding French families.

The surrounding neighborhood continued to grow, and in 1916, the district hired the architecture firm of Joseph E. Mills and Son to design a new eight room addition to the school. However, by 1923 the school was beyond capacity, and kindergarteners had to attend class in a nearby cottage. The district purchased the adjacent lot and constructed a temporary building to house the overflow. The construction of a high school in 1928 alleviated some issues, but Cadieux School still housed 367 pupils in 1929. The district constructed the Lewis E. Maire Elementary School in 1936, and the younger students from the Cadieux School transferred there, leaving the school with seventh and eighth grade students. By this time, the Cadieux School housed the administrative offices of the school district.

The building was later used as administrative offices, but in 2020 the district consolidated administrative operations at Grosse Pointe North High School and sold the Cadieux School building.

== Description ==
The original 1906 building is a two-story brick building with a shallow shingled hipped roof. The corners are quoined with alternating brick and limestone bands. Dentil work runs along the frieze at the top of the building. A central entrance containing double doors projects outward. A limestone plaque above is inscribed "Cadieux School District Number One Township of Grosse Pointe." Above is a doublehung twelve-over-twelve window. A set of four double-hung nine-over-nine windows flank the center entrance on each floor.

The 1918 addition is a two-story flat roofed structure. The facade complements the architecture of the 1906 school. The two buildings are connected by a two-story masonry connector completed in 2001.
