= John and Eliza Barr Patterson House =

Historic house in Michigan, United States

- U.S. National Register of Historic Places
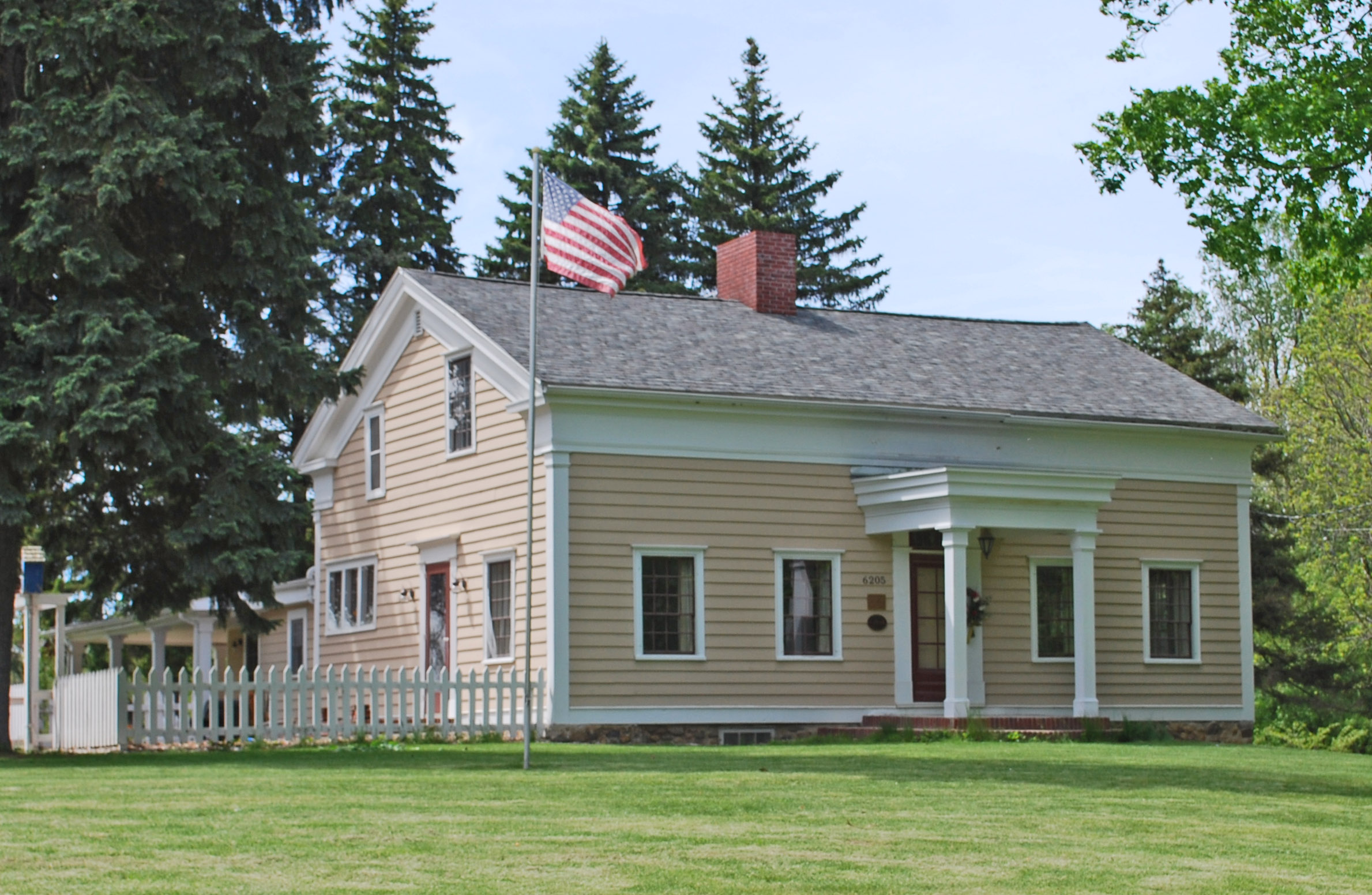

- Location within Michigan Location within the United States
- Interactive map
- Location: 6205 N. Ridge Rd.
- Nearest city: Canton, Michigan
- Coordinates: 42°19′34″N 83°31′40″W
- Area: 1 acre (0.40 ha)
- Built: 1844
- Built by: John Patterson
- Architectural style: Greek Revival
- MPS: Canton Township MPS
- NRHP reference No.: 00000647
- Added to NRHP: June 09, 2000

The John and Eliza Barr Patterson House is a private house located at 6205 N. Ridge Road in Canton, Michigan, United States. It was listed on the National Register of Historic Places in 2000.

== History ==
John Patterson was born in 1804 in Connecticut. John and his wife Pamelia moved to Canton Township in Michigan and purchased property in 1826. Eight years later, in 1834, Pamelia Patterson died in childbirth; John remained a widower for 10 years. In 1844, John Patterson married Eliza Barr; the couple purchased another plot of land and built this house. The couple had multiple children before John died in 1856. John willed his land to Eliza, who married George W. Peters soon after John's death. Eliza Barr Patterson Peters died in 1885, and her land passed, as instructed in John's will, to the couple's son Charles Patterson. The farm remained in the family until 1999.

== Description ==
The John and Eliza Barr Patterson House is a 1 1/2-story, five-bay wood-frame Greek Revival farmhouse with clapboard siding sitting atop a stone foundation. The front facade is symmetrical with a center entrance topped with a transom and flanked by twelve-over-twelve windows. It is topped by a wide frieze, a box cornice with returns, and a shingle roof.

The interior of the house is in substantially original condition. The first floor houses a living room, dining room, a kitchen, and a single bedroom; the second floor contains four additional bedrooms and a bathroom installed circa 1940. Door hardware in the house is original, and one of the bedrooms still contains a c. 1844 stenciled border at the top of the wall. Hand-hewn beams can still be seen in the basement of the house.

A 20th-century barn is also on the property, along with a shed and the foundation of a barn. Evidence of other farm outbuildings can still be seen around the house, as well as rose, daylily, and peony plantings that date from the late 19th and early 20th centuries. A former chicken coop has been converted into living quarters.

== See also ==
- Canton Township MPS
- Canton Charter Township, Michigan
