= Starkweather School =

Historic schoolhouse in Plymouth, Michigan

- U.S. National Register of Historic Places
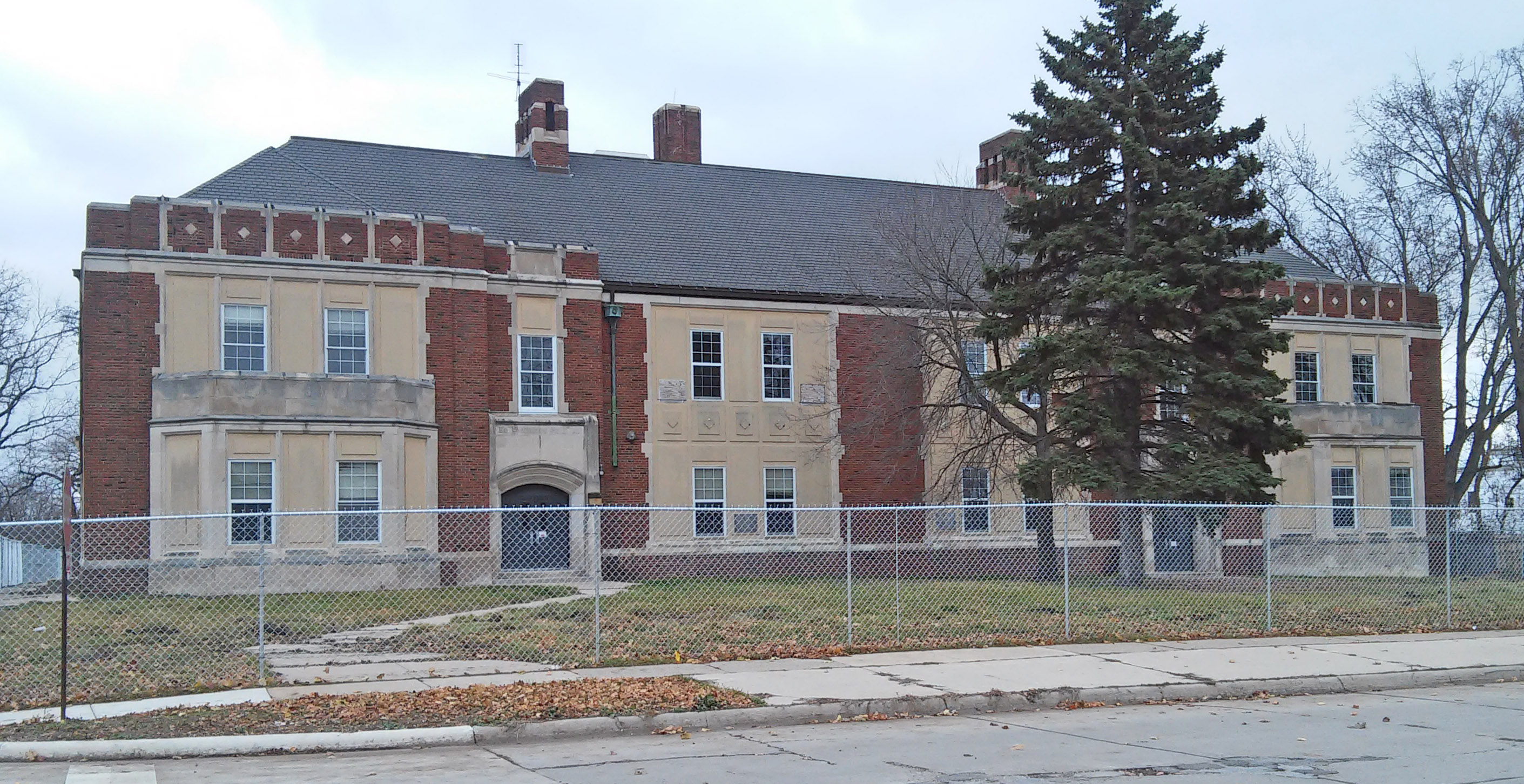

- Location within Michigan
- Interactive map
- Location: 550 N. Holbrook St., Plymouth, Michigan
- Coordinates: 42°22′42″N 83°27′34″W
- Built: 1927
- Built by: Talbot & Meier
- Architect: Malcomson and Higginbotham
- Architectural style: Late Gothic Revival
- NRHP reference No.: 16000762
- Added to NRHP: November 7, 2016

Starkweather School is an educational building located at 550 North Holbrook Street in Plymouth, Michigan. It was listed on the National Register of Historic Places in 2016. It is the only school from its time still extant in Plymouth, and the only school in Plymouth designed by Malcomson and Higginbotham, who designed numerous schools for the Detroit school district.

== History ==
Until the 1920s, the Plymouth school district had relied on a single, centrally located school to service its student population. The first school, a log structure, was built in 1830. This was replaced with a frame structure in 1840 and a larger brick school in 1884, which housed both elementary and high school students. This school burned in 1916, and was replaced with a large building. However, by 1922, the district had grown to nearly 1000 students, and even the 1916 school was severely overcrowded. An elementary school was added that year, located near the main school. By 1926, even this school was overcrowded, and the school board decided to construct a neighborhood elementary school in the North Village section of the city.

The school board hired the firm of Malcomson and Higginbotham to design this school, which was constructed by contractors Talbot & Meier. It was named for George Anson Starkweather, one of the pioneers of Plymouth and a former teacher in the district. The school opened in 1927. It was used as a neighborhood school for several decades, and a gymnasium and cafeteria addition was constructed at the rear in 1961. The school later was converted into an adult education center. It closed in 2013. The district sold the building in early 2016, and developers have plans to renovate the structure into 22 loft spaces, to be called "Schoolhouse Lofts of Plymouth".

== Description ==
Starkweather School is a two-story I-plan structure, faced with red/brown brick with limestone trim, and topped with a high hipped roof. The front facade is symmetrical, with each end featuring prominent bay windows surrounded with limestone and topped with a parapet containing inset brick squares. Hipped roof sections project forward over the bays. Two entryways with arched limestone surrounds are located inboard of the bay windows. The roof was originally clad with slate, but now has asphalt shingles. A pair of limestone-trimmed red brick chimneys sit atop the roof, complementing the facade.

The front facade originally has banks of five tall side-by-side double-hung nine-over-nine windows. One bank was located in each of the two center bays and one more in each bay window in the bay above each. The bay windows had metal spandrel panels with raised center panels between the center bays’ upper and lower tiers. The side and rear facades also had more of these windows, with surrounds that matched those in the front facade. However, the original windows have been replaced with much smaller vinyl windows set into insulated panels that infill the original openings, and dramatically change the look of the building.

Two additions are connected to the main structure. The first is a single-story flat-roof red brick garage connected at the northeast rear corner. The second is a modern hipped roof, red brick gymnasium and cafeteria addition, connected at the southeast rear corner. The gymnasium addition has a windowless red brick base with clerestory windows above, now also replaced with smaller vinyl windows.

On the interior, the building is substantially original. The two entry vestibules have quarry tile floors and brick walls with decorative tiles, manufactured by the Flint Faience Tile Company inset. The corridors floors feature rust-colored sheet linoleum inset into a cream-colored terrazzo bases and with coved border. Corridor walls have a cement wainscoting topped with oak trim. The classroom floors are carpeted, with original wood floors beneath. Each classroom has a blackboard surrounded by stained oak trim, and coat and storage areas on another wall, with bulletin boards either side. The kindergarten room has, in addition, a fireplace surrounded with Flint Faience tile in a field of green, and an oak mantel. The same green Flint Faience tiles surround a drinking fountain.
