= United States Post Office Plymouth Station =

- U.S. National Register of Historic Places
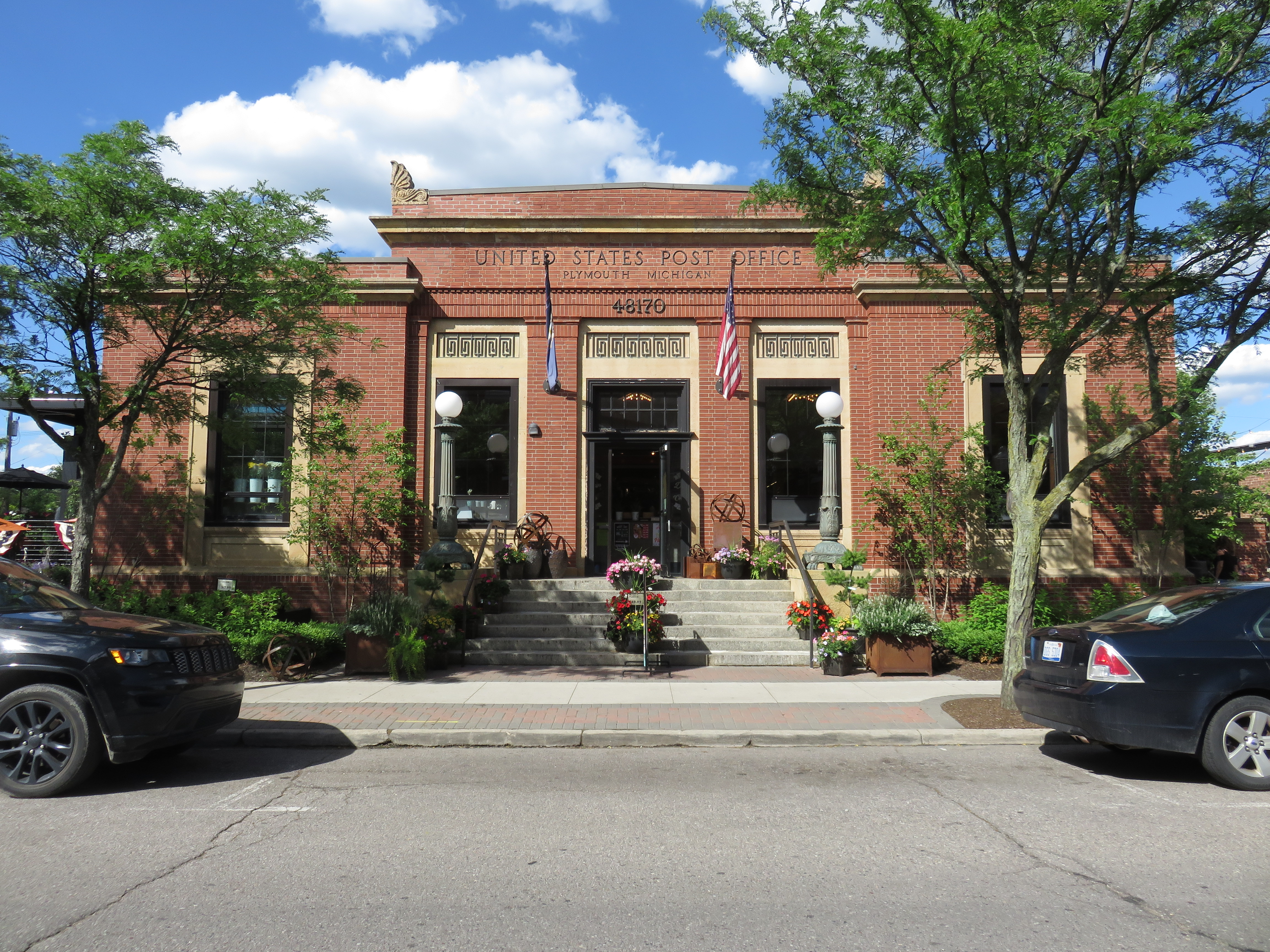
- Post Office in 2019
- Interactive map
- Location: 860 Penniman Ave. Plymouth, Michigan
- Coordinates: 42°22′18″N 83°28′11″W
- Built: 1935
- Built by: Henry M. Martens
- Architect: Louis A. Simon, Wyatt C. Hedrick, Wheeler & Becker Architects
- Architectural style: Classical Revival
- NRHP reference No.: 100010627
- Added to NRHP: July 24, 2024

The United States Post Office Plymouth Station is a former post office located at 860 Penniman Avenue in Plymouth, Michigan. It was listed on the National Register of Historic Places in 2024. The building houses Westborn Market.

== History ==
A call for bids for the construction of this post office was first announced in July 1934. However, it was not until May 1935 that the construction bid was awarded to local builder Henry Martens. Construction began in July of that year, and the building was finished by March 1936. Postal employees moved into the new building at the end of the month, and it was opened to the public on April 1, 1936.

An addition at the rear of the building was constructed in 1959. However, by the 2000s, the post office building was too large, and USPS closed the building to move to a smaller space. In 2014, Plymouth couple Mark and Patty Malcolm purchased the building and made improvements. They then leased it to Westborn Market. Westborn Market opened in the building in 2018.

== Description ==
The United States Post Office Plymouth Station is a single-story Classical Revival red brick structure with limestone accents. The original building measures sixty feet by sixty-six feet; the 1959 addition measures 108 feet by eight-six feet. The main façade is symmetrical and three bays wide, with a large, slightly recessed central entrance bay. Wide brick pilasters within the bay separate the central entrance from windows to each side. The door and windows are set in stone surrounds, and a stone cornice tops the bay.
