= Marx House =

Historic house in Michigan, United States

- U.S. National Register of Historic Places
- Michigan State Historic Site
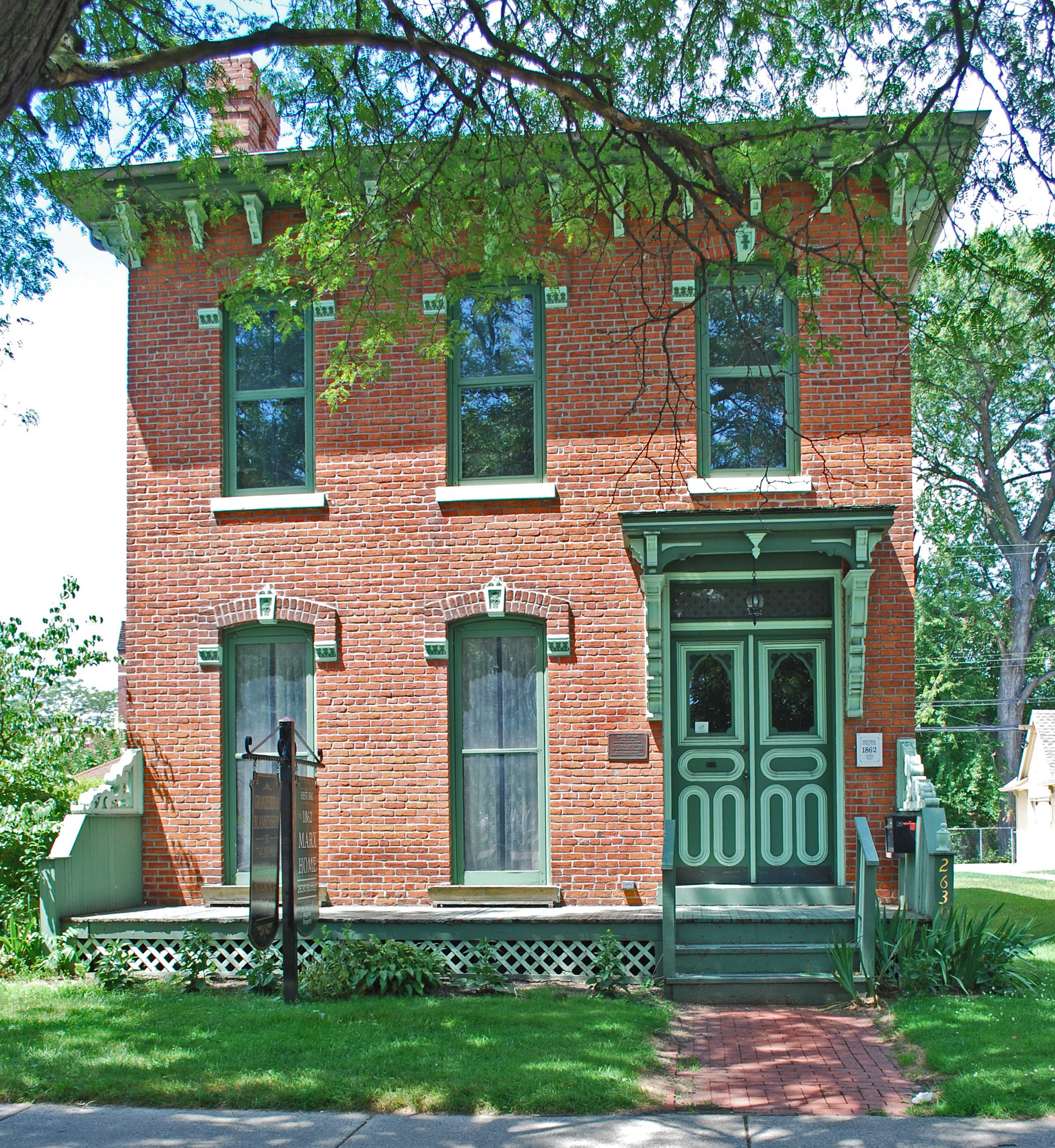

- Location within Michigan Location within the United States
- Interactive map
- Location: 2630 Biddle Avenue; Wyandotte, Michigan
- Coordinates: 42°12′26″N 83°8′56″W
- Area: less than one acre
- Built: 1862
- Architectural style: Italianate
- NRHP reference No.: 76001043

Significant dates
- Added to NRHP: August 13, 1976
- Designated MSHS: January 16, 1976

The Marx House is a private house at 2630 Biddle Avenue in Wyandotte, Michigan. It was listed on the National Register of Historic Places and designated a Michigan State Historic Site in 1976. It is now used by the Wyandotte Historical Museum.

== History ==
This house was built in approximately 1862 for Warren Isham. In the next 60 years, the house went through six owners, including Charles W. Thomas, Wyandotte's first druggist, and Dr. Theophilus Langlois, a prominent physician who served as Wyandotte's mayor for two terms and contributed to other civic projects in the city. In 1921, the house was purchased by John Marx, the city attorney and scion of a local brewery owner. In 1974, John Marx's children Leo Marx and Mary T. Polley gave the house to the city of Wyandotte. The house was opened to the public in 1996.

== Description ==
The Marx House is a two-story Italianate townhouse built of red brick and sitting on a stone foundation. The facade features a double entrance door and tall windows topped with semicircular brick-and-stone hoods. A truncated hipped roof, with ornamental ironwork at the perimeter of the uppermost flat area, caps the structure. A two-story frame wing with a single-story addition is connected at the rear of the building.
