= Mellus Newspapers Building =

- Formerly listed on the U.S. National Register of Historic Places
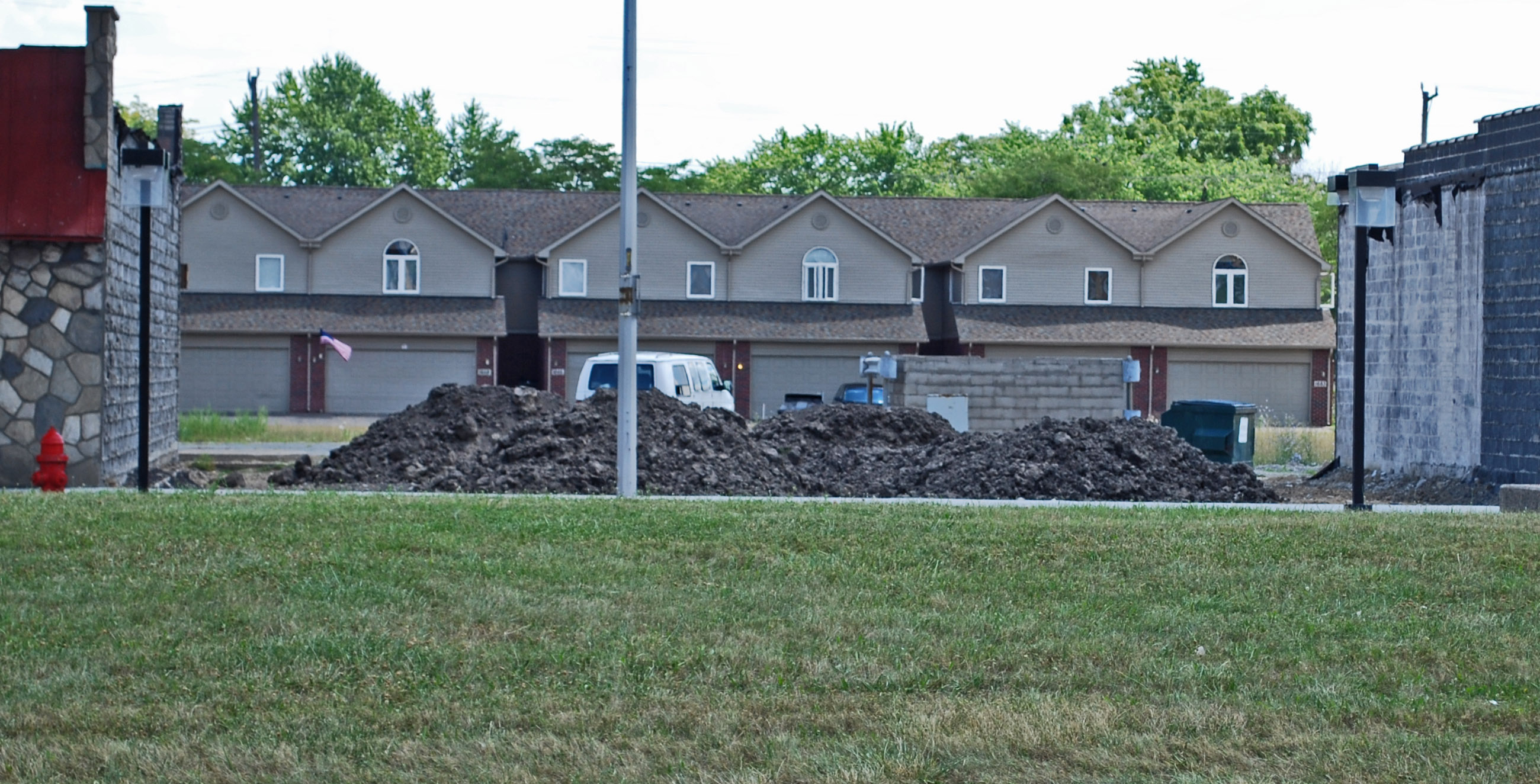
- Former site of building

- Location within Michigan Location within the United States
- Interactive map
- Location: 1661 Fort St., Lincoln Park, Michigan
- Coordinates: 42°15′6″N 83°10′31″W
- Area: less than one acre
- Built: 1941
- Architectural style: Moderne
- Demolished: 2010
- NRHP reference No.: 05000716

Significant dates
- Added to NRHP: July 20, 2005
- Removed from NRHP: July 24, 2024

The Mellus Newspapers Building was a commercial building at 1661 Fort Street in Lincoln Park, Michigan. It was listed on the National Register of Historic Places in 2005, and demolished in 2010. The building was removed from the National Register of Historic Places in 2024.

== History ==
In 1933, William S. Mellus founded the Lincoln Parker, a newspaper serving the city of Lincoln Park. As the population of Lincoln Park grew, Mellus eventually needed more space, and in 1941 he constructed this building on Fort Street. Mellus also published newspapers for other downriver communities: The Allen Parker, Ecorse Advertiser, Southgate Sentinel, Taylor Tribune and Riverview Sentinel. In the 1950s, a two-story addition was constructed in the rear of the building, enlarging the space to 4,080 square feet (379 m^{2}). Mellus also expanded operations into the next-door Pollack Jewellery Building. Mellus sold his newspaper chain to Panax Corp. in the early 1970s. The company remained in the building until 1986, when it merged with Heritage Newspapers. The building was sold by the Mellus family in 1994.

In 2009, the Mellus and the next-door Pollack were purchased by the Lincoln Park Downtown Development Authority for $93,000. The Mellus Building was demolished in May 2010; a small park is planned for the lot.

== Description ==
The Mellus Newspapers Building had simple but distinguishing Art Deco characteristics exemplifying the application of these to a small commercial building. The front facade was covered with white porcelain enamel panels, and the entryway was framed with curved glass block sections. Six steel casement windows faced the front.
