= LeMoyne Gardens =

- U.S. National Register of Historic Places
- Interactive map
- Location: Bounded by Henry Ruff Rd, Liberty St, Burton St, Annapolis Ave, Pine St, Pierce St, Kenwood Ave, and Andover St. Inkster, Michigan
- Coordinates: 42°16′38″N 83°20′09″W
- Area: 33.7 acres
- Built: 1959
- Architectural style: Modern architecture
- NRHP reference No.: 100011221
- Added to NRHP: August 31, 2026

LeMoyne Gardens is a neighborhood located in Inkster, Michigan, and generally bounded by Henry Ruff Road, Liberty Street, Burton Street, Annapolis Avenue, Pine Street, Pierce Street, Kenwood Avenue, and Andover Street. It was listed on the National Register of Historic Places in 2026.

== History ==
As the Ford River Rouge plant expanded in the 1910, Ford hired thousands of workers. Many of those were Black; however, racially restrictive covenants prevented these workers from purchasing homes in Dearborn. Inkster, however, lacked these covenants, and many Black Ford workers chose to make their homes there. In the early 1920s, developers constructed homes in the southwest portion of Inkster and marketed them to Black families. During World War II, Ford factories were devoted to the war effort and required even more workers. In response, the United States Housing Authority and the Federal Works Agency built temporary residences for workers. In 1942m, they constructed 400 residences for Black workers at this site, calling it the LeMoyne Gardens Temporary Defense Housing Complex.

Although these wartime structures were intended to be temporary, residents continued to live in the structures through the late 1950s. By that time, the government push for urban renewal had begun. The city of Inkster hired planning firm Geer Associates to produce a development plan for the city. The Geer plan identified the LeMoyne Gardens Temporary Defense Housing Complex as being "inadequately constructed," and identified the area which currently encompasses LeMoyne Gardens as ripe for clearance and redevelopment. Inkster obtained money from the federal government for the project, and in 1958 embarked on the first renewal project in the area. Residents of the "temporary" housing were relocated, and work on the new LeMoyne Gardens began in 1959.

Buildings in LeMoyne Gardens were constructed in two phases: 94 buildings were constructed in 1959, with the remaining structures built in a second phase, which was complete by 1961. At the time, the development received positive reviews. Although a handful of buildings were demolished over time, the neighborhood remains very similar to when it was constructed. Most of the buildings were occupied until about 2019.

== Description ==
LeMoyne Gardens contains 137 buildings, all but two of which were built between 1959 and 1961. The neighborhood contains 133 residential structures, a community center, and a maintenance building, as well as a maintenance garage and school that were constructed at a later date. The residential buildings are all built to one of seven standard specifications, and are one or two stories tall. Buildings are set back from the street, with walkways to the entrance.

The buildings are clad with brick on the first level, with siding on the second floors. A small brick ledge separates the floors, and the upper floor siding is typically a later vinyl addition covering the original wood tongue-in-groove.
