= Orson Everitt House =

Historic house in Michigan, United States

- U.S. National Register of Historic Places
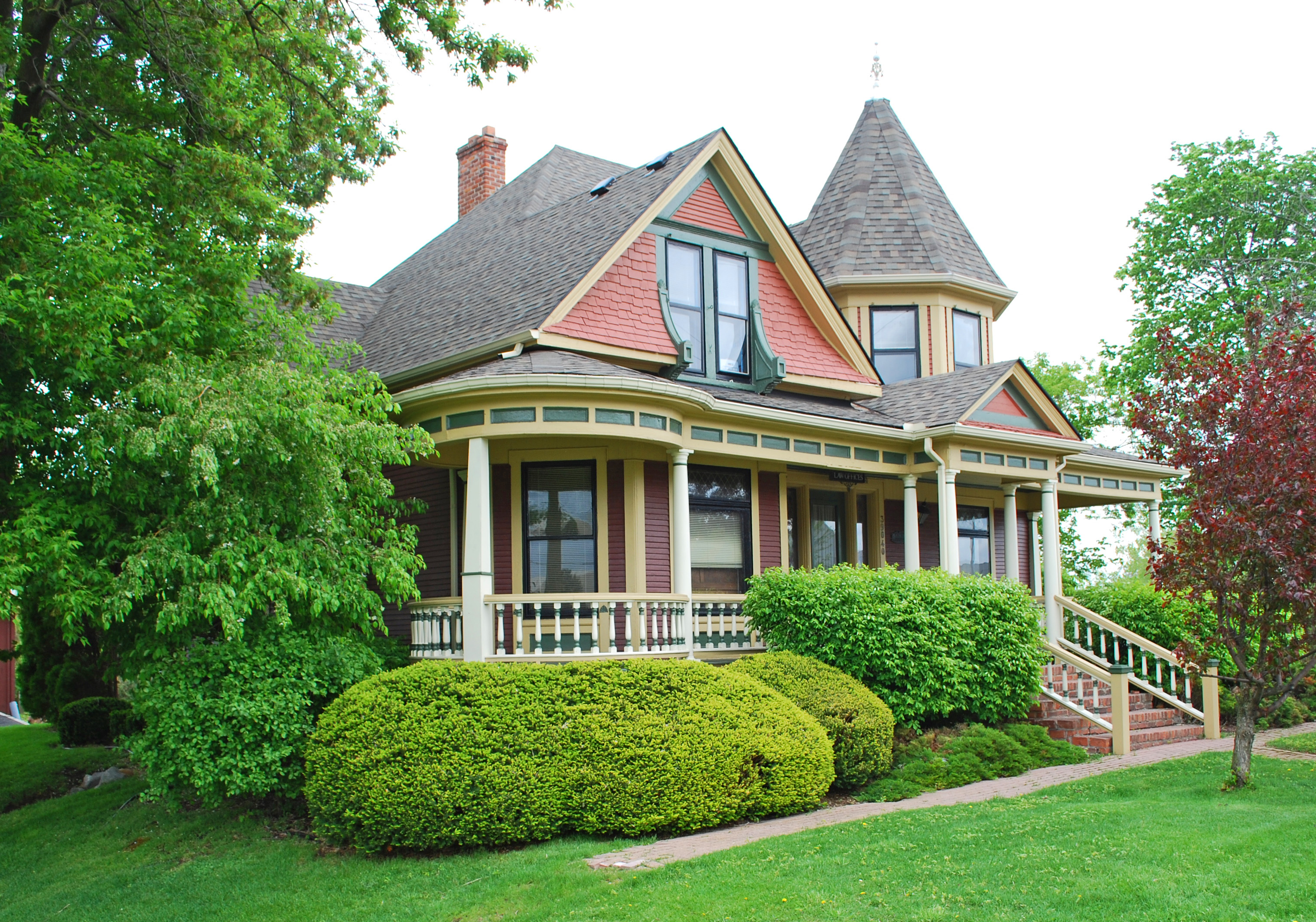

- Location within Michigan Location within the United States
- Interactive map showing the location of Person Everitt House
- Location: 39040 W. Seven Mile Rd., Livonia, Michigan
- Coordinates: 42°25′31″N 83°25′47″W
- Area: less than one acre
- Built: 1899
- Architectural style: Queen Anne
- NRHP reference No.: 80001933
- Added to NRHP: October 14, 1980

The Orson Everitt House is a private house located at 39040 West Seven Mile Road in Livonia, Michigan. It was added to the National Register of Historic Places in 1980.

== Description ==
The Orson Everitt House is an irregularly massed 1 1/2-story wooden house with a hipped roof and clapboard siding with a multi-colored paint scheme. The principal feature of the facade is the broad porch which spans the front; the porch features turned balusters and a circular turret at one end. Various dormers, including a turret with conical, roof break the roof line.

== History ==
Marshall Everitt first settled on the property where this house was built in 1830. A few years later, the family built a simple structure just east of the current house location. As the family prospered, more structures were added, and in 1899, Marshall's grandson Orson Everitt built this house. It is likely the design of the house was selected from a house plan book; a similar house plan can be found in Herbert C. Chivers' Artistic Homes.

Orson Everitt still owned the property in 1915. The house was owned by the Foy family from 1968 till it was sold in 1979-1980 to Klein and Bloom. Being lovers of historical relics and treasuring preservation of beautiful spaces, Richard and Barbara Foy registered the home with the National Register of Historic Places, in efforts to preserve the house from being destroyed by future land development proposals from CBS/Fox Video. Mr. Foy was a well respected businessman in the Livonia area, and Mrs. Foy was an avid artist, antique collector, and homemaker to two children, Dean Foy and Holly Foy.

The house was later converted to office space in 1979 by the law firm of Klein and Bloom.

The property was sold in 2020 and is now home to an engineering company, Northstar Vision.
