= Orrin and Roxanne Fairman Kinyon House =

Historic house in Michigan, United States

- U.S. National Register of Historic Places
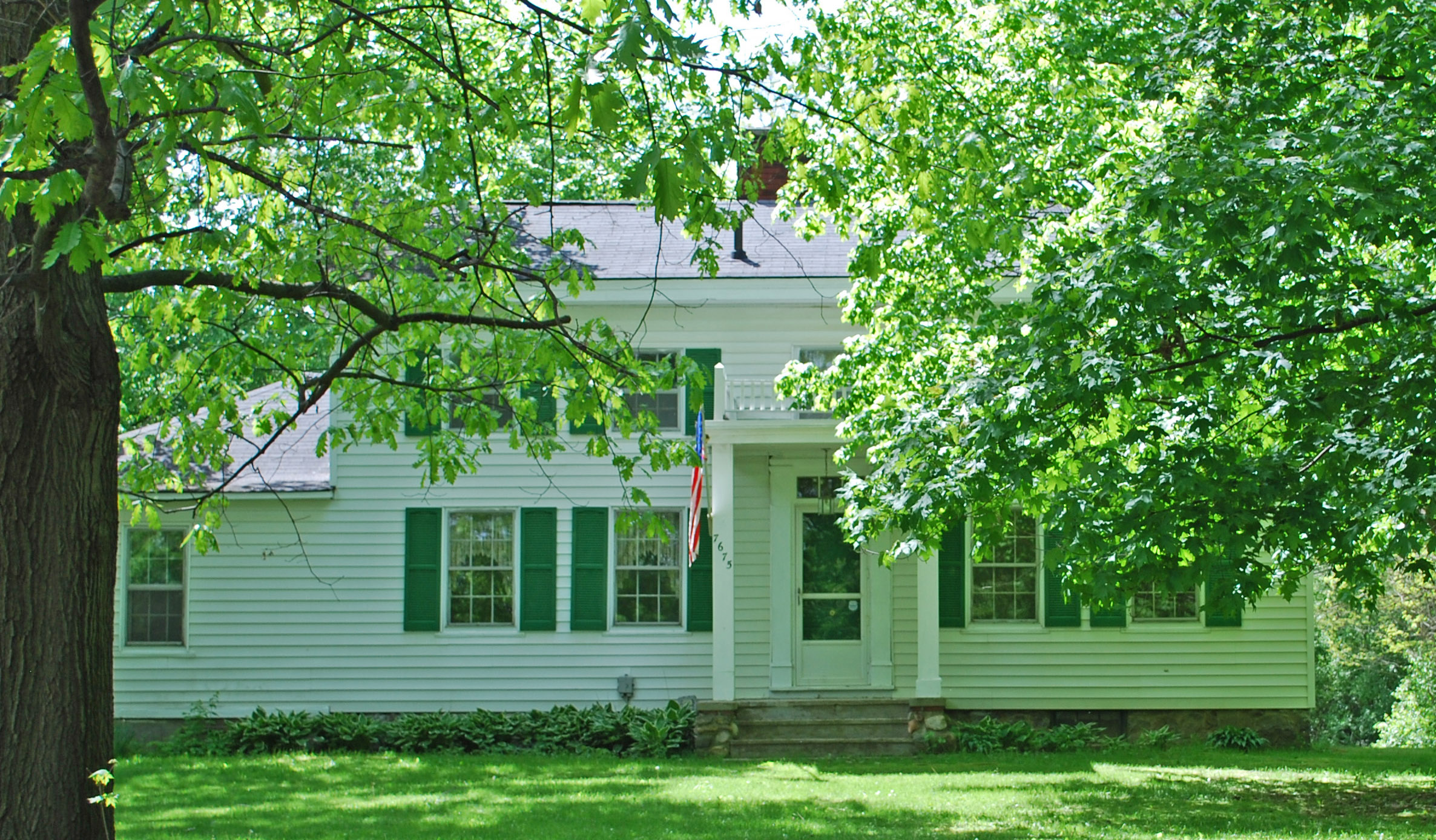

- Location within Michigan Location within the United States
- Interactive map
- Location: 7675 N. Ridge Rd.
- Nearest city: Canton, Michigan
- Coordinates: 42°20′30″N 83°31′43″W
- Area: 2.8 acres (1.1 ha)
- Built: 1850
- Architectural style: Greek Revival
- MPS: Canton Township MPS
- NRHP reference No.: 00000649
- Added to NRHP: June 09, 2000

The Orrin and Roxanne Fairman Kinyon House is a private house located at 7675 N. Ridge Road in Canton, Michigan. It was listed on the National Register of Historic Places in 2000.

== History ==
One of the earliest settlers in Canton Township was Elisha Kinyon; he and his wife Dilla first bought land in the area in 1831. Elisha's son Orrin bought 120 acres (49 ha) from his father in 1834, and in 1835 he married Roxanne Fairman. The couple had eight children between 1836 and 1856, all sons, and built this house in 1850. Only three of the couple's sons survived to adulthood; family tradition recounts that in 1849, Roxanne Kinyon accidentally poisoned two of her sons, and every day thereafter visited their graves for the rest of her life.

Orrin Kinyon was active in township government, serving as Highway Commissioner, School Inspector, Justice of the Peace, constable, and Poor Director between 1835 and 1865.

== Description ==
The Orrin and Roxanne Fairman Kinyon House is a Greek Revival farmhouse, of post and beam construction, sided with wood and sitting on a stone foundation. The rear room was once a summer kitchen, but at some point was integrated into the house proper. Although the house sits on reduced acreage, outbuildings and the remains of an orchard still exist on the property.

== See also ==
- Canton Township MPS
- Canton Charter Township, Michigan
