= Tivadar and Dorothy Balogh House =

Historic house in Michigan, United States

- U.S. National Register of Historic Places
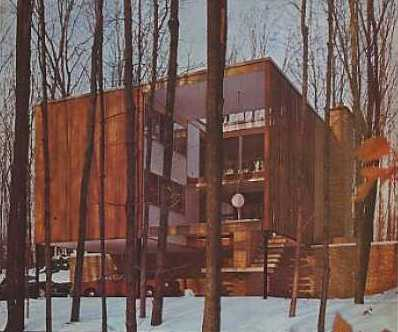
- Balogh House in 1965

- Location within Michigan Location within the United States
- Interactive map
- Location: 49800 Joy Road, Plymouth Township, Michigan
- Coordinates: 42°21′2″N 83°31′52″W
- Built: 1958
- Architect: Tivadar Balogh
- NRHP reference No.: 13000800
- Added to NRHP: September 30, 2013

The Tivadar and Dorothy Balogh House is a private house located at 49800 Joy Road in Plymouth Township, Michigan. It was listed on the National Register of Historic Places in 2013.

== History ==
Tivadar Balogh was born in Detroit in 1926. He served in the United States Navy during World War II, and afterward attended the University of Michigan on a track scholarship. Balogh graduated in 1952 with a degree in architecture; during and after his college career he worked for a string of architectural firms in the area, including Earl Confer; O'Dell, Hewlett & Luckenbach; Robert Metcalf; Shreve, Walker & Associates; and W. B. Ford Design Associates. With the onset of the Korean War, Balogh returned to the Navy for another tour.

After returning to Michigan, Balogh married school teacher Dorothy Bleimeister and began working in Ann Arbor. In 1954, he joined the office of Robert C. Metcalf, where he worked until 1960. In 1958, Balogh purchased the three-acre wooded lot which this house sits on, and designed this house for himself, his wife, Dorothy and their family. The house was constructed in 1958–59. The cost of construction was approximately $32,000, although the Baloghs saved some costs by performing a lot of work themselves.

In 1961, Balogh began his own architectural practice, where he designed approximately 150 residential, institutional and commercial structures in Michigan, Illinois, and Arizona. Balogh also taught at the University of Michigan's College of Architecture and served on various local planning commissions. He retired in 1997 and died in 2006. Dorothy Balogh continued to reside in the house until her death in 2019.

== Description ==
The Balogh House is set back from the road on a heavily wooded lot along a dirt road. The house is a two-story cubic structure, roughly square in plan, and clad in redwood siding. The house sits on a partial basement on one side and support posts on the other side. The section beneath the house was originally open, and used for parking; the space beneath gives the house an impressive "lightness" and makes it appear to hover above the landscape. The dramaticness of the house has been reduced due to the infilling of the underneath to create a new room.

The house is entered by a simple cantilevered stairway that ends in an open section of the house's volume. The interior contains 1,600 square feet (150 m^{2}) of living space spread over three levels (including an unfinished basement and office space at grade level). The first floor contains a kitchen, bathroom, bedroom, and a two-story living room, along with an open stair in the center of the building. The second floor contains two bedrooms and a bathroom. Interior walls are primarily covered with Douglas fir boards.
