= Malcolm X House =

- U.S. National Register of Historic Places
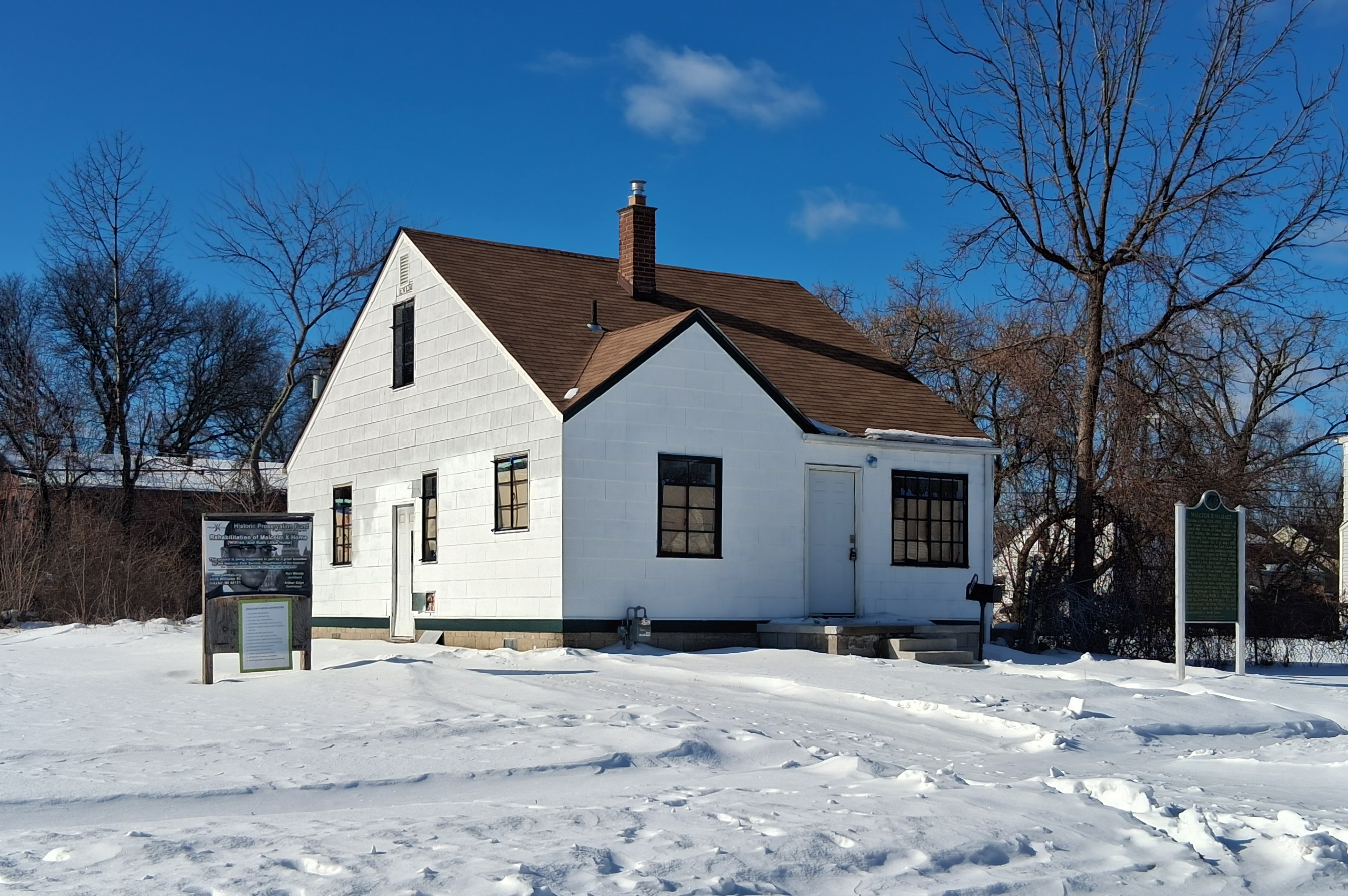
- Malcolm X House, February 2026
- Interactive map
- Location: 4336 Williams St., Inkster, Michigan
- Coordinates: 42°16′39″N 83°18′46″W
- Built: 1950
- Architectural style: Modern architecture
- NRHP reference No.: 100007205
- Added to NRHP: November 29, 2021

The Malcolm X House, also known as the Wilfred and Ruth Little House, is a private house located at 4336 Williams Street in Inkster, Michigan. It is significant for its association with African American Human Rights defender and Civil Rights leader Malcolm X, who lived here with his brother Wilfred Little in 1952-53. The building was listed in the National Register of Historic Places in 2021.

== History ==
This house was built in 1950, and the first family to own the home was Wilfred Little (Wilfred X) and his wife Ruth. Wilfred had joined the Nation of Islam in the 1940s, and by 1950 he was identified as a spokesman for Temple No. 1 in Detroit. In 1952, he helped facilitate the parole of his younger brother, Malcolm, and welcomed him into his house. Not long after arriving in Inkster, Malcolm met the Honorable Elijah Muhammad, who formally assigned him the "X." In 1953 he was named Assistant Minister of Temple No. 1, and by late 1953 he was sent to the East Coast to help recruit new members and establish more temples. Although he moved from Michigan in the latter half of 1953, he would continue to visit his brother in Inkster over the years.

The house was eventually abandoned and fell into disarray, before a major federal grant provided to the Inkster-based non-profit organization Project We Hope, Dream, and Believe in 2021 led to restoration efforts. The reconstruction became part of The Malcolm X House Historical Preservation Project whose goal is to transform the home into a museum that highlights the lives of both Malcolm X and his brother Wilfred.

== Description ==
The Malcolm X House is a one-and-a-half-story, side-gable seven room, minimalist modern house built in 1950. It is built of wood, and is nearly identical to some other houses nearby which were built around the same time. The front is asymmetrical, with an entrance door flanked by two window openings. An offset cross-gable is set to one side. The house sits on a concrete foundation.

== Archaeology ==
A joint effort between Wayne State University's Department of Anthropology and Project We Hope, Dream, and Believe led to a series of archaeological excavations that included the participation of students, faculty, and local community members and other volunteers. The digs led to the recovery of countless artifacts and were part of the broader effort to preserve the home, itself, and the materials associated with its occupancy over the decades.
