= David and Elizabeth Bell Boldman House =

Historic house in Michigan, United States

- U.S. National Register of Historic Places
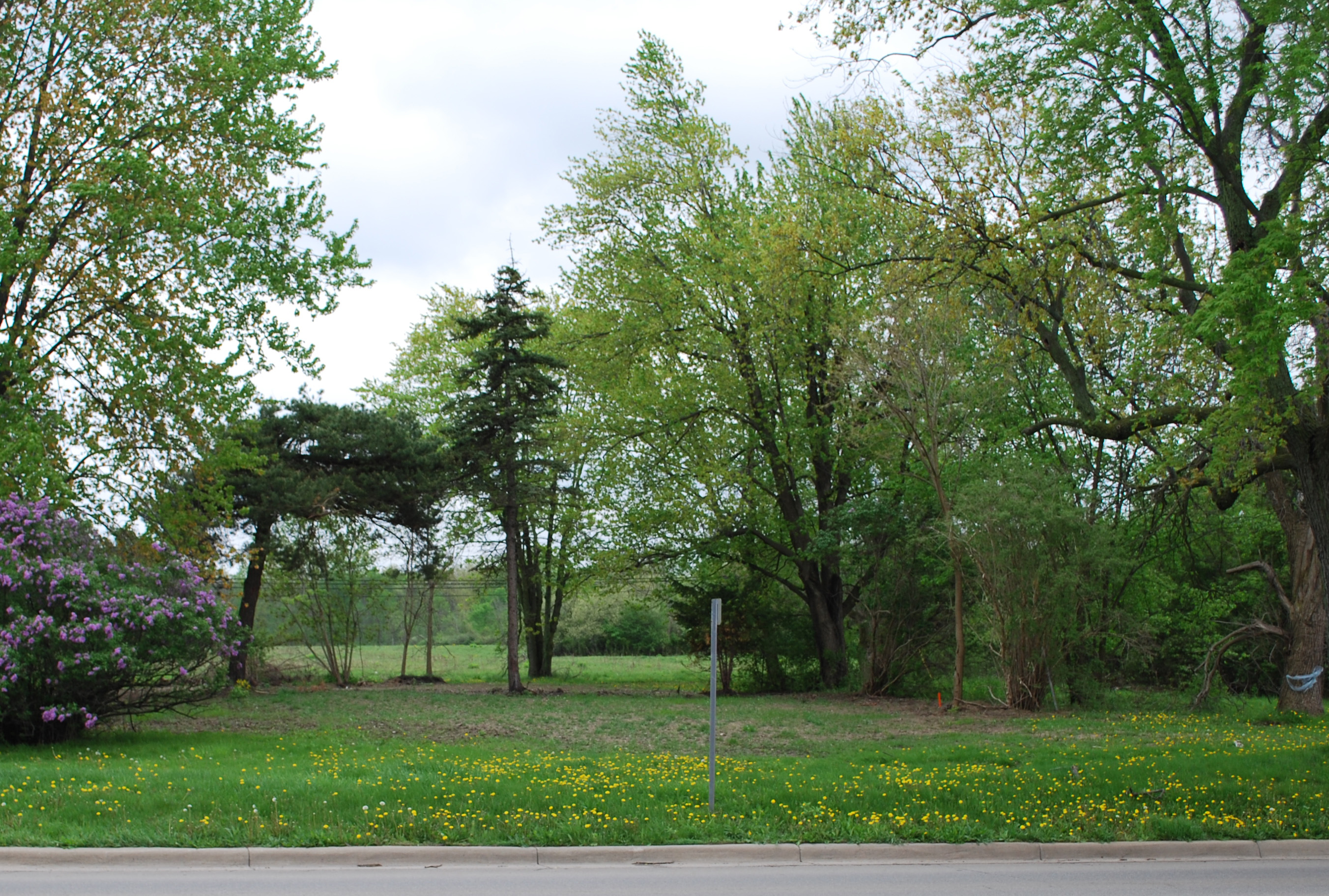
- Former site of the David and Elizabeth Bell Boldman House

- Location within Michigan Location within the United States
- Interactive map
- Location: 3339 Canton Center Road, Canton Township, Michigan
- Nearest city: Sheldon, Michigan
- Coordinates: 42°16′54″N 83°29′9″W
- Area: 10.3 acres (4.2 ha)
- Built: 1835
- Architectural style: Greek Revival
- MPS: Canton Township MPS
- NRHP reference No.: 00000615
- Added to NRHP: June 02, 2000

The David and Elizabeth Bell Boldman House was a private house located at 3339 Canton Center Road near Sheldon in Canton Township, Michigan. It was listed on the National Register of Historic Places in 2000. The former site of the house is now vacant.

== Description ==
The David and Elizabeth Bell Boldman House was a basilica-style Greek Revival with a two-story center section flanked by single-story wings. The center section had an open, two-story portico with a square Doric column at each end and a triangular pediment above. The basilica style of Greek Revival house is unique to southeast Michigan, western New York and northeast Ohio, and the two-story portico is relatively rare in the north. The front facade had a center door with two flanking windows surrounded by fluted molding, and two matching windows on the second story. The house was built of wood with a foundation of fieldstone, and portions of hand-hewn log construction were visible in the basement.

== The Boldmans ==
Henry Boldman came to Canton Township from Scotland via New York, one of the first settlers in the township. He built this house around 1835. It was enlarged by his son David Boldman, the establisher of a cheese factory, around 1858. David Boldman was very involved in township government, holding the posts of highway commissioner, constable, and township treasurer multiple times between 1847 and 1875.

The David and Elizabeth Bell Boldman House is significant in its reflection of the growing affluence of the area's settlers and their sense of pride in their improving situation.

== See also ==
- Canton Township MPS
- Canton Charter Township, Michigan
