= Trudel =

Trudel may refer to:

== People ==
- Alain Trudel (born 1966), Canadian conductor, trombonist and composer
- Claude Trudel (born 1942), Canadian politician
- Denise Trudel (born 1955), Canadian politician
- Ferdinand Trudel, politician in Quebec, Canada
- François-Xavier-Anselme Trudel (1838–1890), politician in Quebec, Canada
- Jacques Cossette-Trudel (1947–2023), convicted kidnapper, Quebec separatist (FLQ)
- Jacques Trudel (1919–2004), Liberal party member of the House of Commons of Canada
- Jean-Guy Trudel (born 1975), Canadian former professional ice hockey left winger
- Jean-Louis Trudel (1967–2025), Canadian science fiction writer
- Johanne Trudel (born 1953), judge currently serving on the Canadian Federal Court of Appeal
- Karine Trudel, Canadian politician and MP for the federal riding of Jonquière
- Louis Trudel (1912–1971), American professional ice hockey player
- Louise Cossette-Trudel (born 1947), Canadian convicted kidnapper and writer
- Luc Trudel, Canadian politician
- Marc Trudel (1896–1961), politician in Quebec, Canada
- Marcel Trudel (1917–2011), Canadian historian, university professor (1947–1982) and author
- Olivier Trudel (1781–1859), farmer and political figure in Lower Canada
- Rémy Trudel (born 1948), university professor and a former Quebec politician
- Rene Trudel or Rene Trudell (1919–1984), professional ice hockey player
- Robert Trudel (1820–1886), politician in Quebec, Canada
- Sylvain Trudel (born 1963), French-Canadian writer
- Yves Trudel (1950–2022), Canadian actor

== Geography and astronomy ==
- Trudel, New Brunswick, Canadian village in Gloucester County, New Brunswick
- Trudel Glacier, glacier at the head of Trudel Creek in southwestern British Columbia, Canada
- 21753 Trudel, an asteroid

== See also ==
- Miron v Trudel, a Supreme Court of Canada decision on equality rights
- Strudel
- Trousdell
- Trudelj
- Trudell
- Truesdell (disambiguation)
