= Canton Township MPS =

- U.S. National Register of Historic Places
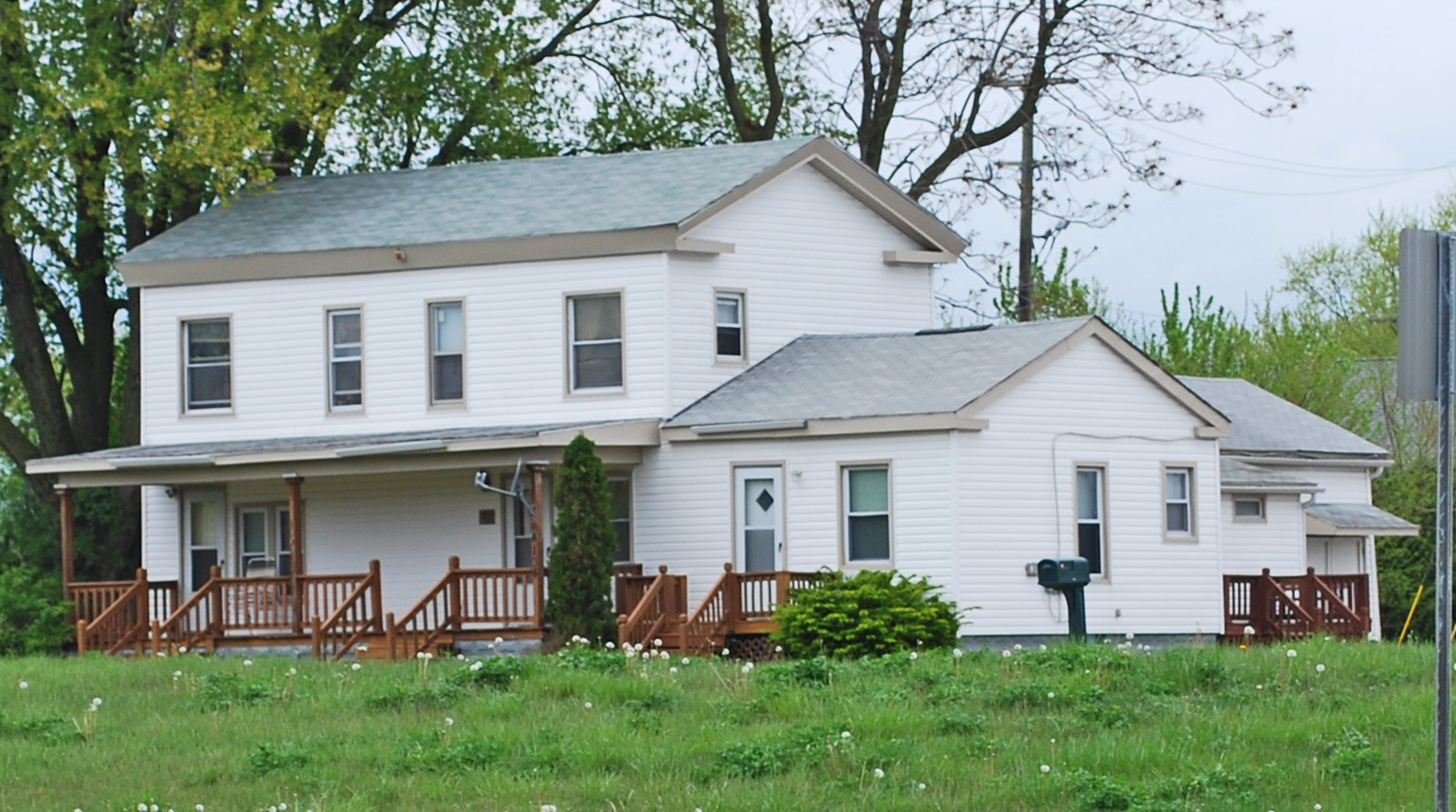

- Location within Michigan Location within the United States
- Interactive map showing the location of Canton Township MPS
- Location: Canton Township, Michigan
- Coordinates: 42°18′29″N 83°29′10″W
- Area: 2.3 acres (0.93 ha)
- Built: 1825 - 1904
- Architect: Charles W. Curtiss, John Patterson, unknown
- Architectural style: Greek Revival, Stick-Eastlake, Queen Anne, Greenhouse, Upright and wing, Gabled-ell house, New England large house
- MPS: Canton Township MPS
- NRHP reference No.: 00000614 - 00000619, 00000647 - 00000649, 03000174 - 03000175
- Added to NRHP: April 02, 2003

The Canton Township MPS is a multiple property submission, listed on the National Register of Historic Places in 2003. A multiple property submission is a group of related structures that share a common theme. The Canton Township MPS consists of eleven houses (some with associated property and outbuildings) built between 1825 and 1904 and located in Canton Township, Michigan.

== Early history and settlement ==
Although lands around Detroit had been settled since the early 18th century, it took considerably longer for interior parts of Michigan to attract settlers. After the American Revolution, the United States began plans to expand into what was then the Northwest Territory. However, the British still held onto some trading posts in the area, and the Native Americans still held legal title to most of Michigan. The War of 1812 removed the British from the area, and a series of treaties with area tribes removed most obstacles to settlement.

However, it was commonly believed that the interior of Michigan was of poor quality: Edward Tiffin, surveyor general of the United States in the 1810s, reported that the area consisted primarily of swamps, likes, and poor sandy soil. Thus, most early settlers headed for more southerly (and more easily accessible) lands near the Ohio River, and surveying in Michigan wasn't begun until 1815.

Eventually, settlers (primarily from New York and New England) made it into the area. The first purchasers of land in Canton Township were Philander and Samuel Burd, who filed on May 30, 1825. A week later, Timothy Sheldon (builder of the Sheldon Inn) and Lucretia Downer purchased property; by the end of 1825 thirteen people had settled in the township. The opening of the Erie Canal in October 1825 made the journey to Michigan easier and spurred settlement in Michigan. Land purchases in Canton Township peaked in 1833, and all but 14 of the 328 parcels were sold by 1836. By the 1840 census, the population of Canton Township was 1081.

Many families whose houses are included in this MPS were among the first wave of settlers purchasing property in Canton. Timothy Sheldon built his Sheldon Inn in 1825 shortly after he arrived in the area. Moses Bradford (Benjamin's brother) also arrived in 1825, and John Patterson arrived in 1826. Elisha Kinyon, Orrin's father, bought land in 1831; both Orrin Kinyon and Benjamin Bradford purchased their own farms in 1835. These families, as were the bulk of Canton's early settlers, traveled from New York and New England to Michigan.

== Later history ==
A second wave of settlers arrived in the latter half of the nineteenth century. Unlike the first settlers from New England, this second wave consisted primarily of immigrants from Central Europe. Two houses built by German immigrants or their descendants, the Phillip and Maria Hasselbach Dingledey House and the John and Edna Truesdell Fischer Farmstead.

For the remainder of the century, the population of the area remained relatively stable, and farmland was passed from generation to generation. Whereas the early settlers engaged in subsistence farming, their descendants were able to turn farming into a business, with many going into the dairy business. In the twentieth century, farmers turned to market farming, delivering their produce and other goods to markets in Detroit and other area cities.

== Architecture ==
Many of the early settlers in Canton Township were from New York and New England. These pioneers brought Greek Revival-style architecture with them and implemented it when they constructed their own houses. All pre-1865 houses on this MPS were originally constructed in the Greek Revival style, although one (the Thomas and Maria Blackman Bartlett House) was later updated with Victorian elements.

As the nineteenth century progressed, the local family farms prospered, and the farmers grew more affluent. This economic success was reflected in the increasing size and modernity of the houses built in Canton Township. Earlier houses were updated and/or enlarged as the residents were able to afford more space. At the same time, architectural styles changed, with later houses being of an upright and wing or gabled-ell design. Near the end of the century, typically Victorian house forms, Stick-Eastlake and Queen Anne were also used.

=== Houses in MPS ===
| Resource Name | Image | Address | architecture | Built | Description |
|---|---|---|---|---|---|
| Thomas and Maria Blackman Bartlett House | | 500 N. Ridge Rd. | New England large house | 1840 | The Thomas and Maria Blackman Bartlett House (also known as the Bartlett-Travis House) was originally constructed c. 1840 in a Greek Revival style, but in subsequent years has been updated with Victorian elements. In 1989, the house was moved to its current location and placed on a new foundation. Restoration work was begun in 1994 and finished in 2002. |
| David and Elizabeth Bell Boldman House | | 3339 Canton Center Road | Greek Revival | 1835 | The David and Elizabeth Bell Boldman House was a basilica-style Greek Revival with a two-story center section flanked by single-story wings. The former site of the house is now vacant. |
| Benjamin and Mary Ann Bradford House | | 48145 Warren Rd. | Greek Revival | 1860 | In 1825, Moses Bradford moved to Canton Township, one of the first settlers to stake a claim in the area. The following year, Aruna and Mary Bradford, Moses's parents, followed their son to Canton Township. On arrival, they bought the property this house now sits on; in 1835 they sold the parcel to their other son, Benjamin. In 1860, Benjamin built the house that now stands on the property; it remained in the Bradford family until 1911. |
| Thomas and Isabella Moore Clyde House | | 50325 Cherry Hill Rd. | Greek Revival | 1845 | The Thomas Clyde House is a 1 1/2-story clapboard upright and wing Greek Revival house with an unusual asymmetrical facade. It was built c. 1845, and moved from its original location across the street to its present location in 1924. |
| Phillip and Maria Hasselbach Dingledey House | | 1638 Haggerty Road | Upright and Wing house | 1881 | The Phillip and Maria Hasselbach Dingledey House was an upright and wing style farmhouse with a relatively unusual double upright. The house is no longer at its listed location; a small commercial complex now occupies the site. |
| John and Edna Truesdell Fischer Farmstead | | 4896-5228 Sheldon Road | Queen Anne, Greenhouse | 1897 | This farmstead includes an 1897 Queen Anne house built by the children of German immigrants, as well as a 1945 ranch house, 18 greenhouses, a boiler house, a modern garage, and the remnants of a barn and silo. |
| Orrin and Roxanne Fairman Kinyon House | | 7675 N. Ridge Rd. | Greek Revival | 1850 | This house is a Greek Revival farmhouse, of post and beam construction, sided with wood and sitting on a stone foundation. It was built in 1850 by Orrin Kinyon, the son of one of Canton Township's original settlers. |
| John and Eliza Barr Patterson House | | 6205 N. Ridge Rd. | Greek Revival | 1844 | In 1844, John Patterson married Eliza Barr; the couple purchased another plot of land and built this Greek Revival house. The farm remained in the family until 1999. The grounds still contain rose, daylily, and peony plantings that date from the late 19th and early 20th centuries. |
| Sheldon Inn | | 44134 Michigan Avenue | Greek Revival | 1825 | The Sheldon Inn is a two-story Greek Revival apartment building, previously used as a single-family home and a travelers' inn. The Inn was built by Timothy and Rachel Sheldon, one of the first families to settle in Canton Township, in 1825. |
| George and Mary Pine Smith House | | 3704 Sheldon Road | Gabled-ell house | 1904 | The land this house sits on was first farmed by William Smith of England, who purchased 80 acres (320,000 m^{2}) of land in 1830. William Smith and his wife Mary Collins Smith raised seven children on this farm, establishing a long line of Smiths farming in Canton Township. William's grandson George Smith Jr. married Mary Pine, and in 1904, George Jr. and Mary Smith spent $2,058.76 to build the house that now sits on the property. Although the present acreage is small, outbuildings on the property give the feel of the old farmstead and the wooded edges isolate the house from the surrounding modern developments. |
| Ephraim and Emma Woodworth Truesdell House | | 1224 Haggerty Road | Stick-Eastlake | 1888 | The structure is significant as one of the most finely crafted houses in the township, as well as its association with one of the most important families in the area. |

== See also ==
Canton Charter Township, Michigan Cherry Hill, Michigan
