= Truesdell =

Truesdell may refer to:

Given name

- Truesdell Sparhawk Brown (1906–1992), classical scholar, ancient historian, co-founder of the journal California Studies in Classical Antiquity
- Elmer Truesdell Merrill (1860–1936), American Latin scholar, born at Millville, Massachusetts
- Jesse Truesdell Peck (1811–1883), American bishop of the Methodist Episcopal Church, elected in 1872

Surname

- Aaron D. Truesdell, 19th-century American politician
- Alex Truesdell (born c. 1955), American designer and maker
- Clifford Truesdell (1919–2000), American mathematician, natural philosopher, and historian of science
- Donald Leroy Truesdell (1906–1993), United States Marine Corps Corporal who received the Medal of Honor
- Glenn Truesdell (1909–1992), American businessman and politician
- Keith Truesdell, American television director and producer
- Leon E. Truesdell (1880–1979), American demographer
- Nathan Truesdell, independent film-maker
- Nick Truesdell (born 1990), American football tight end
- Xavier Lamar Truesdell (born 1985), also known as XL, American actor, model, singer, songwriter, and producer

Locations

- Truesdell, Wisconsin, residential and business neighborhood of the city of Kenosha in east-central Kenosha County, Wisconsin, United States
- 90446 Truesdell, minor planet

Other

- Truesdell middle school, a regular middle Wichita Public School, Kansas, United States
- Truesdell Bridge Disaster, also known as the Dixon Bridge Disaster in 1873, when the bridge across the Rock River at Dixon, Illinois, collapsed
- John and Edna Truesdell Fischer Farmstead, private farm, including house and outbuildings, at 4896–5228 Sheldon Road in Canton Township, Michigan
- Ephraim and Emma Woodworth Truesdell House, private house at 1224 Haggerty Road in Canton Township, Michigan

== See also ==
- Raynor, Nicholas & Truesdell, New York brokerage based on Broadway in the 1920s
- Trudel (disambiguation)
- Trudell
