= Isabella Moore =

Isabella Moore may refer to:

- Belle Moore (Isabella Mary Moore, 1894–1975), Scottish competition swimmer
- Isabella Moore, establisher of the Thomas and Isabella Moore Clyde House, an NRHP-listed house in Michigan, U.S.
