= Coldwater Downtown Historic District =

Historic district in Michigan, United States

- U.S. National Register of Historic Places
- U.S. Historic district
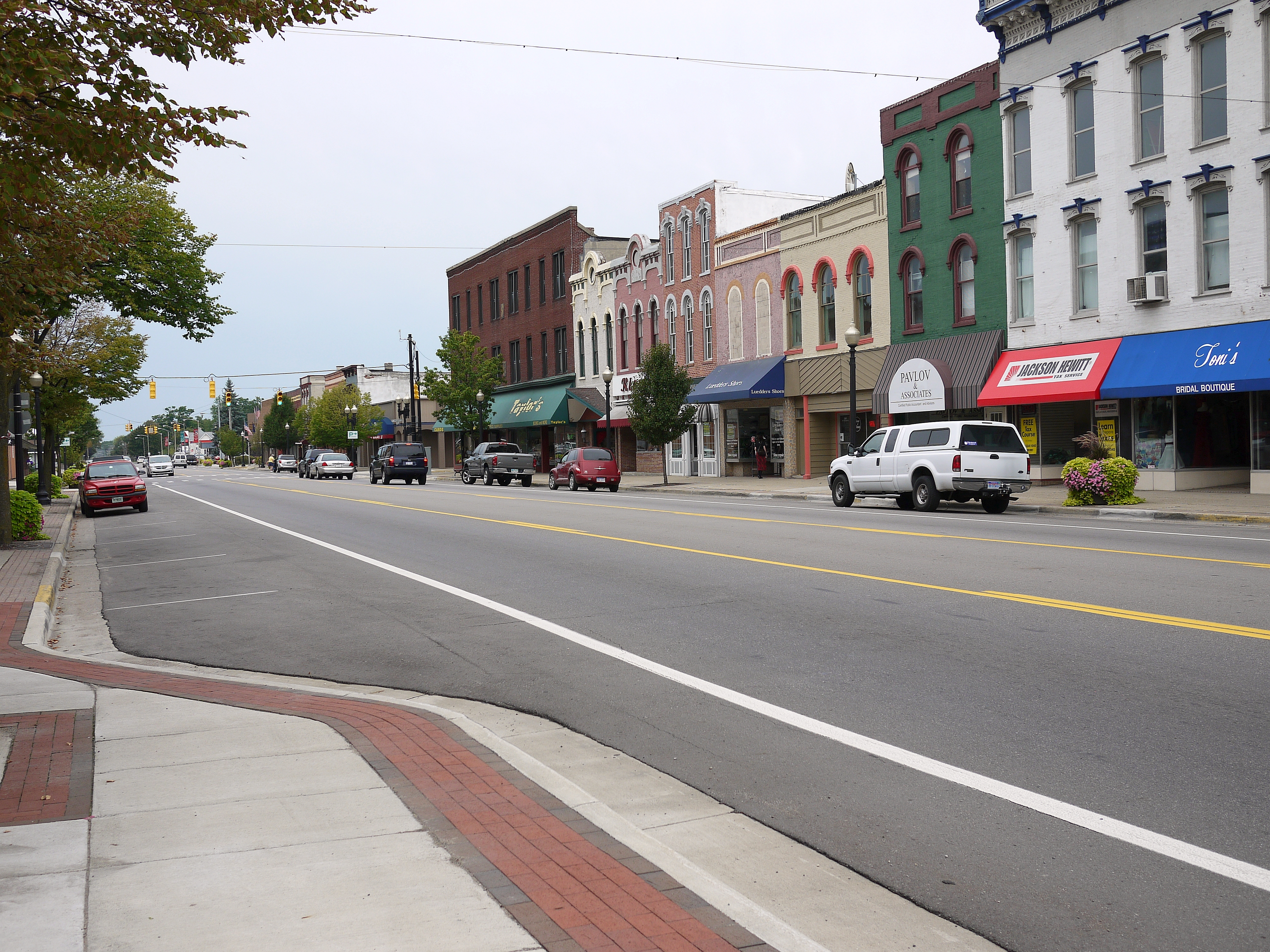
- Chicago, looking west from Monroe

- Location within Michigan Location within the United States
- Interactive map showing the location of Coldwater Downtown Historic District
- Location: W. Chicago St. from Division to Clay Sts., Coldwater, Michigan
- Coordinates: 41°56′28″N 85°0′14″W
- Area: 8 acres (3.2 ha)
- Architectural style: Classical Revival, Late Victorian, Italianate
- NRHP reference No.: 90001124
- Added to NRHP: July 26, 1990

The Coldwater Downtown Historic District is a primarily commercial historic district located along West Chicago Street from Division to Clay Streets in Coldwater, Michigan. It was listed on the National Register of Historic Places in 1990.

== History ==
An early trading post was established in what is now Coldwater in 1822. The Chicago Road (now Chicago Street) was constructed through the area in the late 1820s. The village itself was first platted in 1831, and commercial improvements were made almost immediately, with the area that is now this historic district becoming the commercial center of the village. As Coldwater grew, more commercial businesses were established, scattered along the Chicago Road. The establishment of a Michigan Southern depot at the foot of South Monroe Street in 1851 created a concentration of commercial interest in the blocks of Chicago near Monroe.

The earliest structures in the downtown were wooden frame buildings. However, a series of major downtown fires in the early 1850s caused the village to mandate masonry construction in the downtown area, beginning in 1854. The building boom continued through the 1870s and 1880s, and many of the remaining buildings in the district date from that time period. A number of early 20th century buildings were also constructed in the district.

== Description ==
The Coldwater Downtown Historic District runs along several blocks of West Chicago and adjacent cross streets in Coldwater's central business district. The contains 64 buildings, 49 of which contribute to the historic character of the district. Nearly all of the buildings are one- to three-story brick commercial structures, constructed from the 1860s to the 1920s. The buildings are set side-by-side directly along the sidewalk, and are primarily Italianate in design, with some Gothic Revival, Neo-Classical, and other architectural styles interspersed.

Significant structures in the district include:

- H. J. Woodward & Son Building (23 West Chicago): This two-story building has round-head Italianate windows flanked by raised brick pilasters.
- Coldwater National Bank Building (28 West Chicago): This three-story limestone, Neo-Classical building was constructed in 1929. It is three bays wide, with an Ionic portico in antis spanning the front facade. The building now houses municipal offices of Coldwater.
- Old Post Office (25 N. Monroe) The Old Post Office is a three-story Italianate building constructed in 1882.
- Tibbits Opera House (14 S. Hanchett): Constructed in 1881-82., the Tibbits Opera House is a large brick building housing a surviving Victorian auditorium. The exterior has been substantially altered.
- Post Office (36 W. Pearl): Constructed in 1909/10, the post office is a broad limestone and buff brick building with a red tile roof.

== Gallery ==
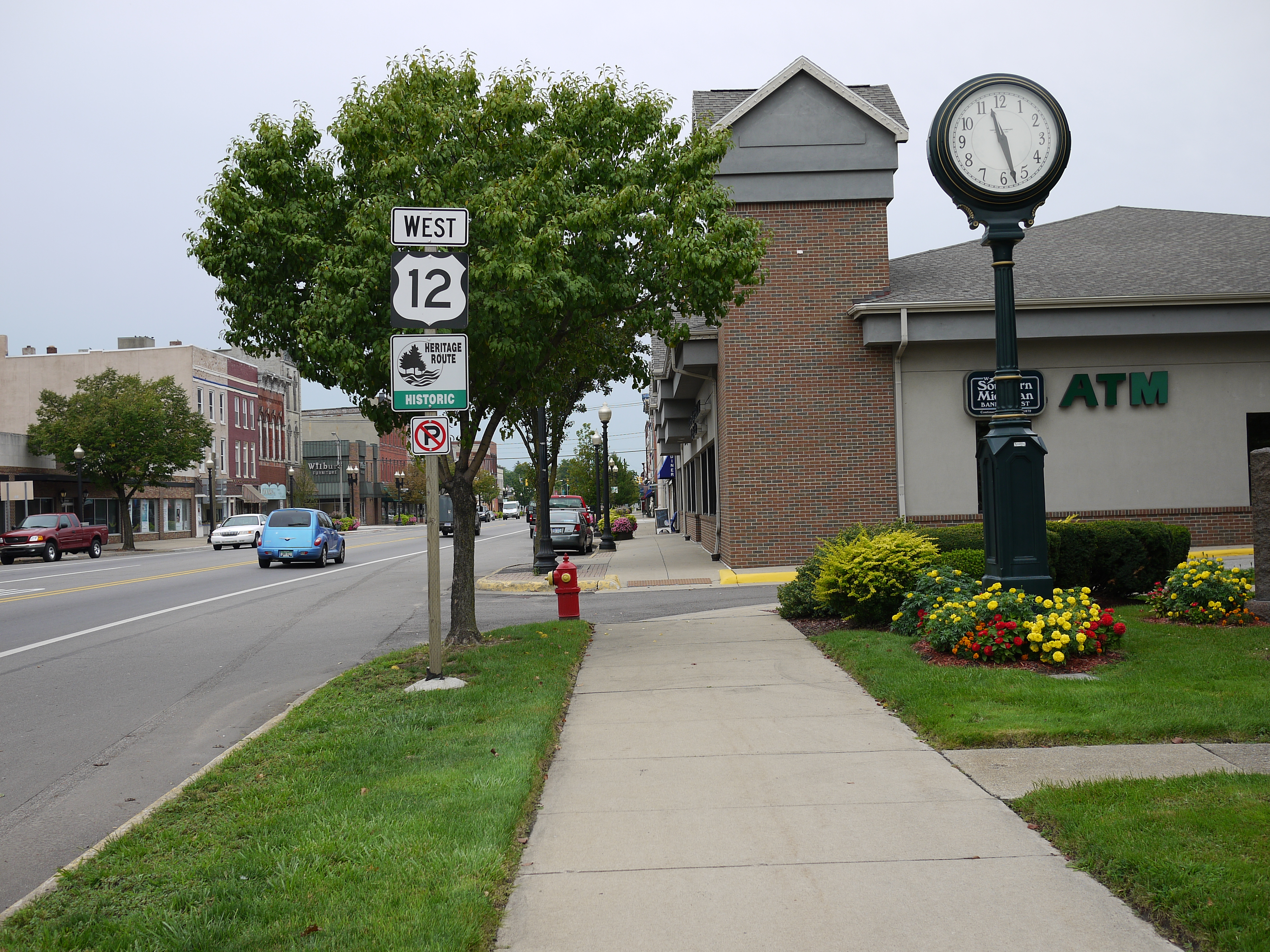
Chicago, looking west from Marshall

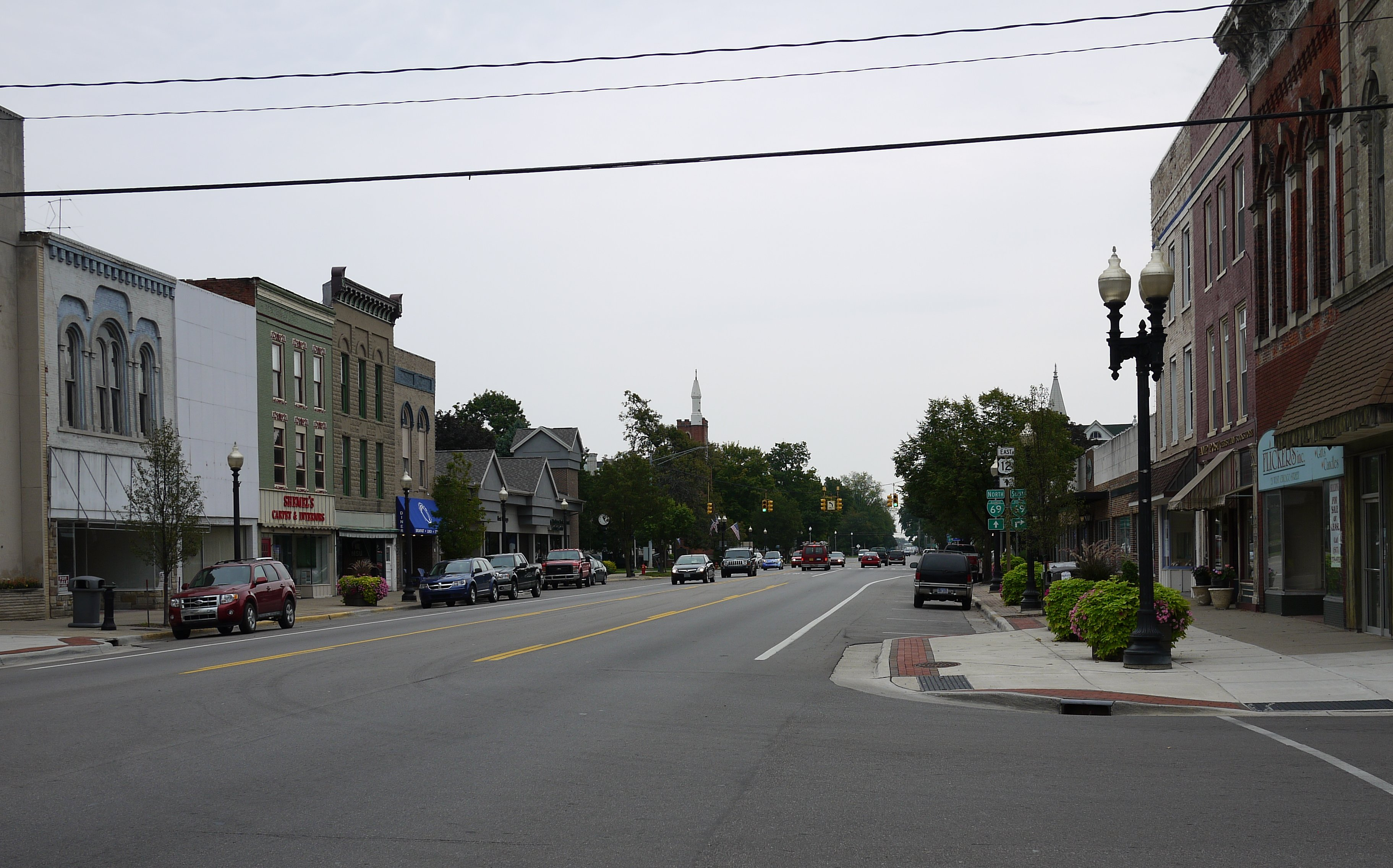
Chicago, looking east from Monroe

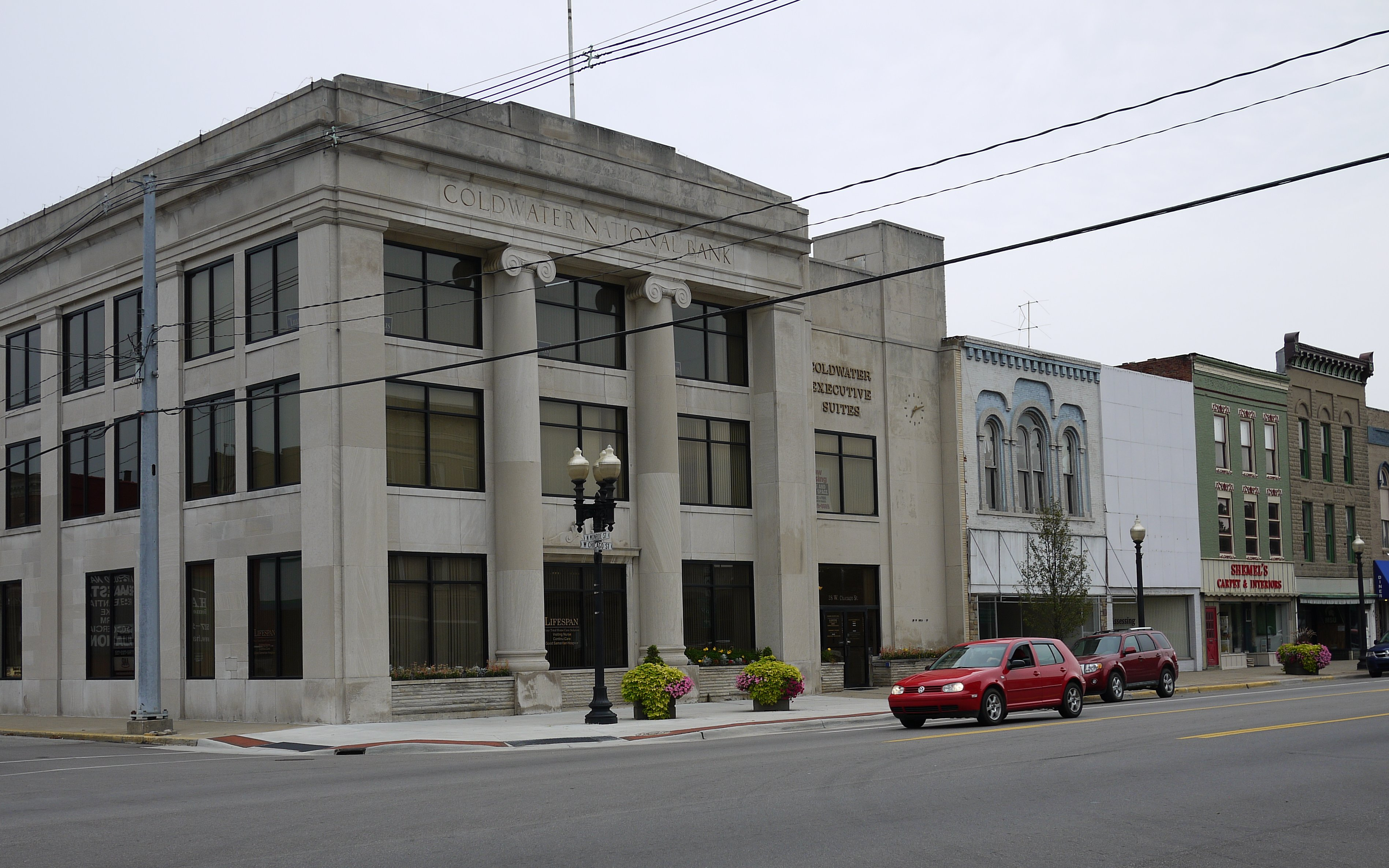
Northeast corner of Chicago and Monroe

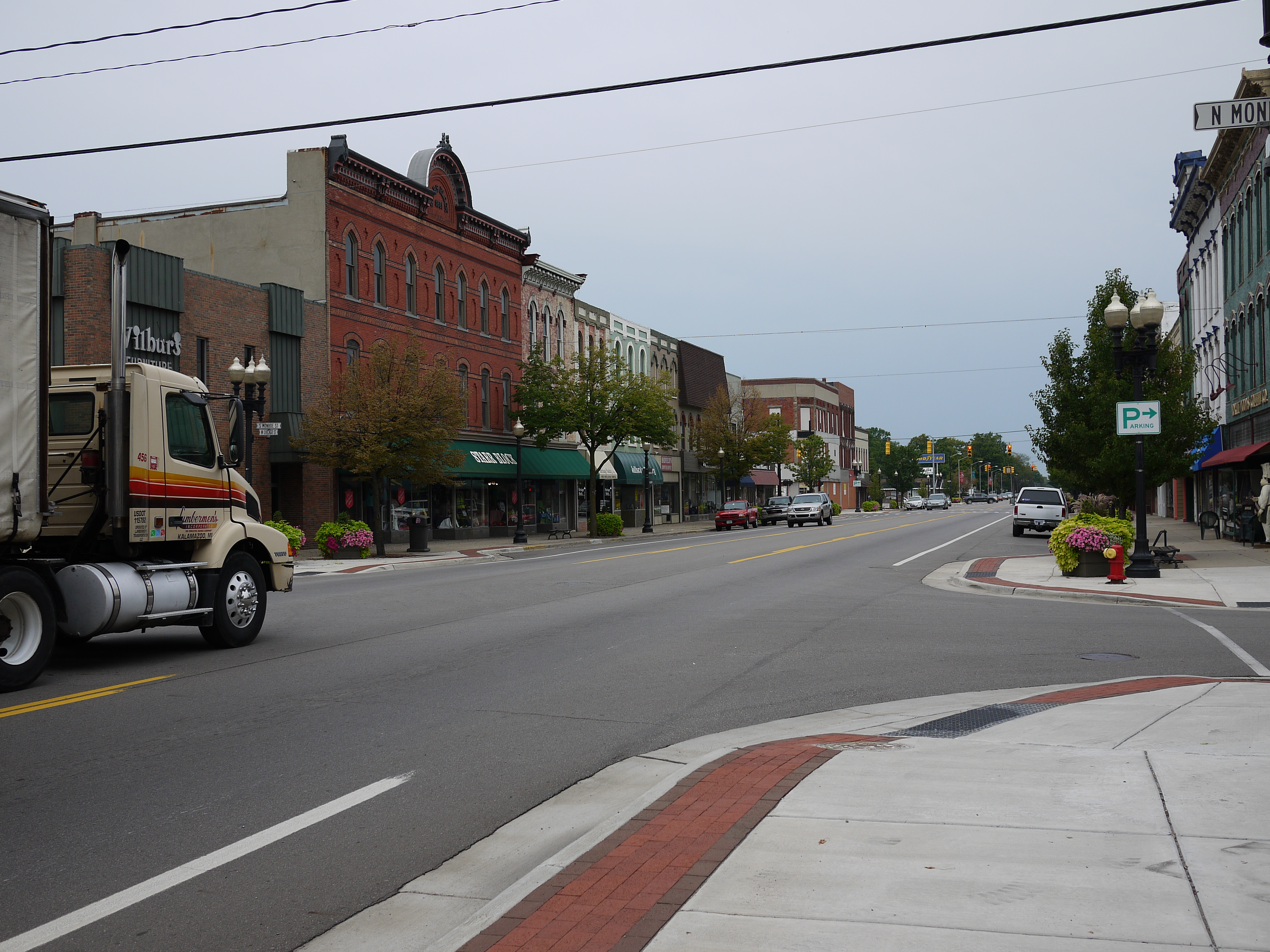
Chicago, looking west from Monroe

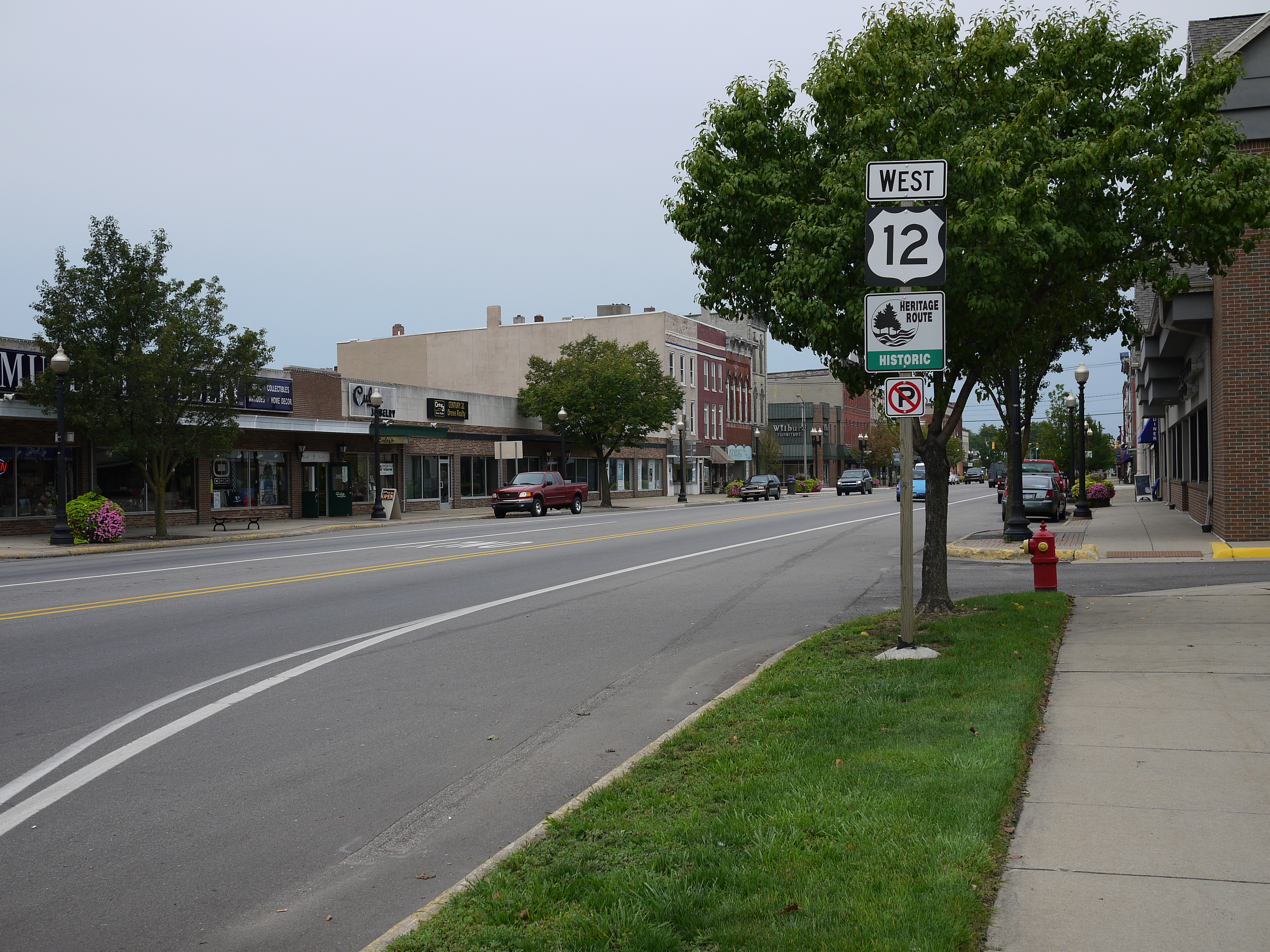
Chicago, looking west from Marshall

== See also ==
- National Register of Historic Places listings in Branch County, Michigan
