= Constantine Historic Commercial District =

Historic district in Michigan, United States

- U.S. National Register of Historic Places
- U.S. Historic district
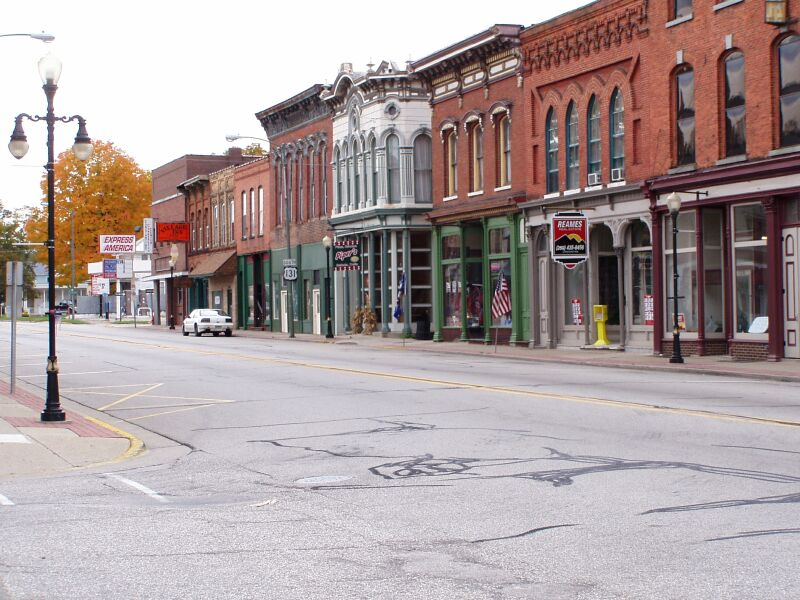
- Washington Street, looking south

- Location within Michigan Location within the United States
- Interactive map
- Location: Washington St. between Second and Water & Water St. between White Pigeon and 125 W. Water, Constantine, Michigan
- Coordinates: 41°50′31″N 85°40′8″W
- Area: 5 acres (2.0 ha)
- Architectural style: Greek Revival, Gothic Revival, Italianate
- NRHP reference No.: 85002444
- Added to NRHP: September 17, 1985

The Constantine Historic Commercial District is a primarily commercial historic district located in Constantine, Michigan along Washington Street between Second and Water Streets, and along Water Street between White Pigeon Street and 125 West Water. It was listed on the National Register of Historic Places in 1985.

== History ==
Constantine was first settled in 1828; by 1830 there was a mill and five families at the location, and the village itself was platted in 1831. The area was easily accessible from the Chicago Road, and following the removal of the government land office from White Pigeon, Constantine emerged as the principal settlement in the area. By 1840, over 800 people lived in the village. Industrial buildings were constructed along the river to take advantage of the water power and the easy access to transportation. Commercial enterprises first appeared along Water Street, but as the village grew, merchants began locating along Washington Street.

The first commercial buildings in the village were wooden Greek Revival structures. Although many of these were destroyed by fire over the years, five still survive within the district. These include one building at 145 S. Washington which still exhibits its original 1850s storefront facade, as well as the Barry warehouse at 125 W. Water, which was owned by the prominent merchant and three-time governor John S. Barry. Constantine did not become a railroad stop until the 1870s, and it slipped behind other settlements in shipping and transportation. However, with the onset of the 1870s, a number of substantial and ornate Italianate commercial buildings were constructed in the district.

As the 20th century arrived, development shifted to outside the district, so that all but one of the buildings located within this district were constructed before 1916. By the 1950s, more outlying commercial districts began pulling customers away from the downtown. In the 1970s, redevelopment began in the downtown.

== Description ==
The Constantine Historic Commercial District contains 34 commercial and residential structures within a 5-acre area. Most of the structures are mid-nineteenth to early twentieth century Greek Revival and Italianate buildings. The district is particularly notable for the integrity of its historic storefronts: unlike similar commercial districts, 3/4 of the buildings in this district retain the original street level design elements.

Significant buildings within the district include:

- Simons Block (120-138 S. Washington): Constructed in 1875, probably for general store operator John W. Simons, this building is the only three story structure in the district. It has several distinguishing architectural features, including a large metal cornice with a pediment above bearing the name and date of construction, and arched window openings with radiating brick around a central keystone. The street level retains the original design of alternating entrances, pilasters, and display windows.
- 140 S. Washington: This building was constructed in 1870 for clothier Michael A. Melcher. It retains its original design features, and is a unique combination of Gothic and Italianate styles, with Gothic arched windows, with Italianate brickwork.
- 150 S. Washington: Constructed in 1877, this Italianate building was first a clothing store, but has served as a general and hardware store since 1904.
- Art Gallery Building (156 S. Washington): The Art Gallery Building, independently listed on the Register, was constructed in 1877 for George I. Crossett to house his Crossett Drug Store on the first floor, along with a photographic studio on the second floor. It has a unique cast iron facade on the upper floor.
- Wells and Calam Block (117 S. Washington): This building was built in 1870 for the general store of the firm of Wells and Calam. It is a richly detailed Italianate building.
- 145 S. Washington: This is an 1850s Greek Revival commercial building constructed for harness maker Clinton Doolittle. Although covered with siding, the storefront still retains the original street level design of two raised rectangular windows framing a recessed door flanked by sidelights.
- The Barry Warehouse (125 W. Water): Although the old Barry Warehouse no longer exhibits much architectural integrity, it is historically significant for the association with John S. Barry, three time Michigan governor.
- 122. E. Water: This brick-veneered Italianate building was constructed in 1885. The building is notable for the decorative tile and terra cotta frieze, and for the stained glass in the transoms.

== Gallery ==
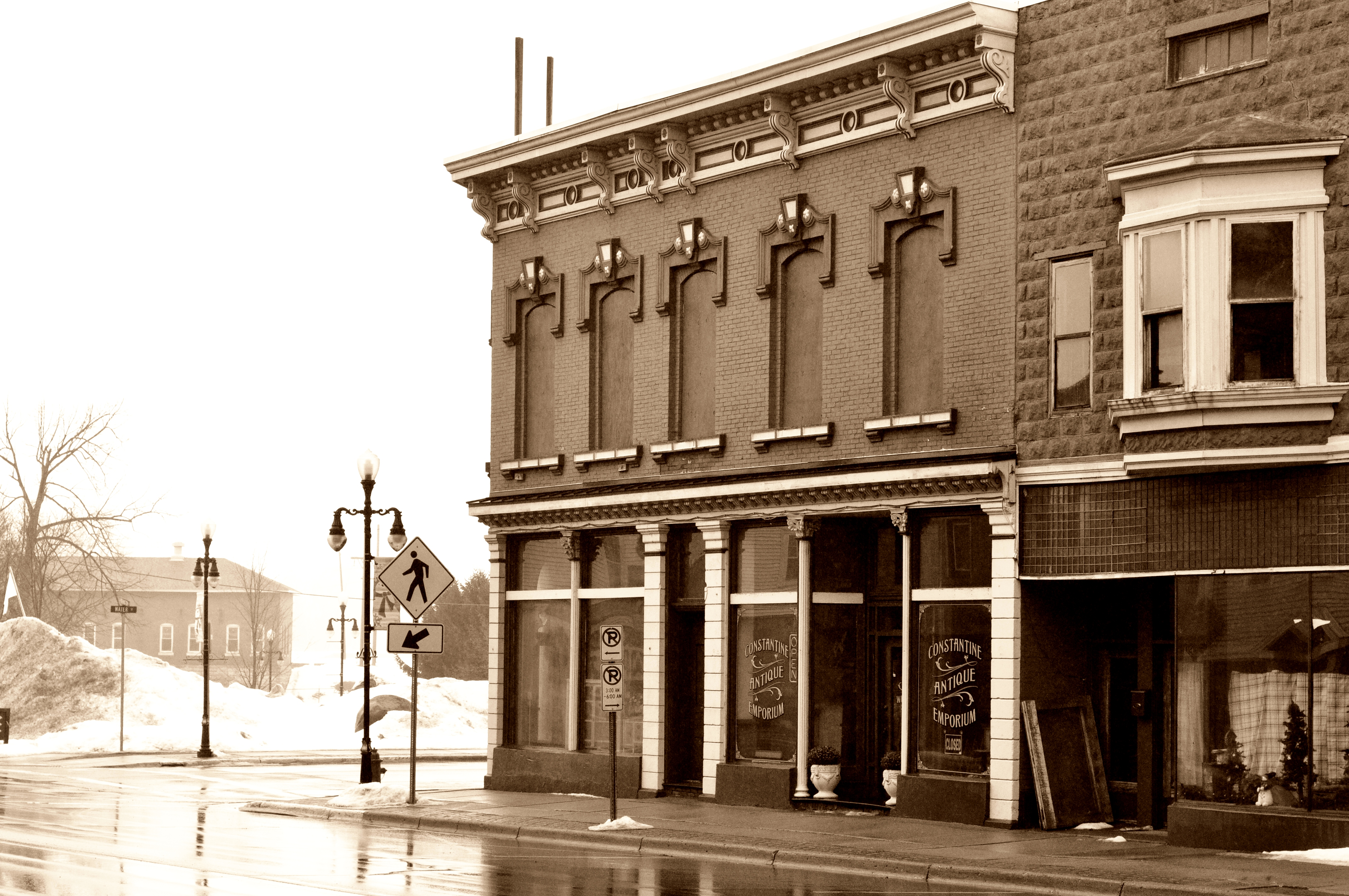
Corner of Washington Street, 2014

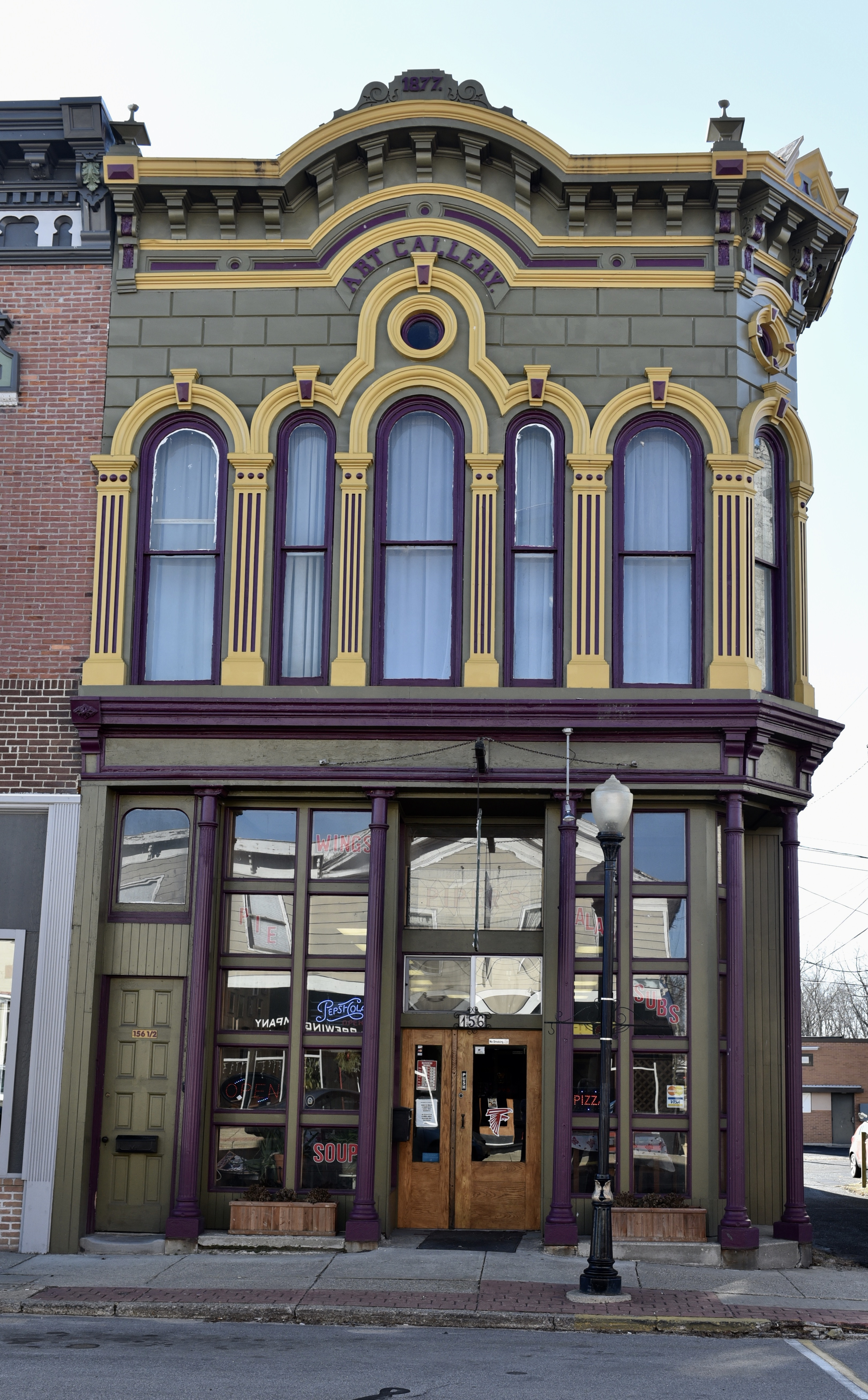
Art Gallery Building

== See also ==
- National Register of Historic Places in St. Joseph County, Michigan
