= Zunera Ishaq =

Canadian woman at the centre of a face-covering controversy

- Born: 1985 (age 40–41); Lahore, Pakistan
- Occupation: Teacher
- Spouse: Mohamed
- Children: 4

Zunera Ishaq (born 1986) is a Canadian Muslim woman living in Mississauga, Ontario, Canada, who was at the centre of a debate about the right to wear a niqāb— a veil that covers most of the face—when taking the Oath of Citizenship at a public citizenship ceremony administered under the Citizenship Act, RSC 1985, c C-29, which became a point of controversy during the 2015 Canadian federal elections.

Ishaq follows the Hanafi school of thought, and has worn the niqāb since her teen years in Lahore, Pakistan. In 2013, while being a Pakistani national, she challenged the probation on full-face veils during citizenship ceremonies, arguing that it violated her right to religious freedom, and explained that she is however willing to unveil herself if necessary for the purposes of security and to prove identity in private in front of other women.

The issue became a significant policy issue for the federal Cabinet—then headed by Prime Minister Stephen Harper—during the campaign with Harper speaking strongly in favour of the requirement. Ishaq challenged the niqāb ban and won in Canada v Ishaq on October 5, 2015. The Federal Court of Appeal decision in her favour is seen by some as "an opportunity to revisit the rules governing the somewhat difficult relationship between law and policy." "The issue of face coverings at citizenship ceremonies became a highly divisive one on the federal election trail, generating sparks in two French-language debates." In October 2015, The Cabinet, still headed by Harper, asked the Supreme Court of Canada to take up the case and pleaded for the Federal Court of Appeal to suspend its ruling in the meantime.

With the appointment of Prime Minister Justin Trudeau on October 19, 2015, the niqāb issue was settled as the Liberal government chose to not "politicize the issue any further." On November 16, 2015, the newly appointed Minister of Justice and Attorney General Jody Wilson-Raybould spoke with Ishaq by telephone to tell her of the government's decision to withdraw the Supreme Court challenge prior to making her official announcement. It was her first act as justice minister.

== Early life, education and career ==
Ishaq's father was a psychology professor in Lahore. Their family was liberal and they were moderate Sunni Muslims. When she was fifteen and in Grade 11, she made the decision to wear the niqāb. Her sisters did the same and her father insisted she understand the implications before making the choice.

"This was not something my husband asked for, as journalists now think – I didn’t know my husband at the time. My sisters made the same decision. No one compelled them to wear the veil. They just felt more comfortable."

— Zunera Ishaq Interview with The Independent UK 30 September 2015

She studied English literature and during one of her exams a male teacher asked the eighteen-year-old Ishaq, "How can you explain yourself when you wear this veil over your face?" She explained in the 2015 interview with The Independent that "I was confused and surprised – but I told him to mind his own business...[and] I passed my exams."

Ishaq related to Ophelia in Shakespeare's Hamlet as she too was "treated with scorn and cruelty."

"I found that women in English literature were also treated very harshly... It’s not only in Islam that people talk about women like this. I am going to fight on for the right to wear the veil. I am 90 per cent certain I will win and if I don’t, I will also appeal."

— Zunera Ishaq

Zunera Ishaq was a teacher in Lahore. She married Mohammad, then a 35-year-old mosque imam and a Canadian citizen in Lahore in 2006 and they had four children.

== Zunera Ishaq's Canadian citizenship process ==
Zunera Ishaq came to Ontario, Canada in 2008. On December 30, 2013 "Zunera Ishaq's application for Canadian citizenship was approved by a citizenship judge. She completed her citizenship test in November 2013. The final step was the swearing in ceremony where she would take the Oath of Citizenship scheduled for January 14, 2014.

However, Ishaq was unwilling to comply with the removal of face coverings when taking the Oath of Citizenship at a public citizenship ceremony administered under the Citizenship Act, RSC 1985, c C-29, because it would betray her religious faith as a Sunni Muslim. She then "filed for judicial review asking the Federal Court to enjoin immigration officials from applying these provisions of the Manual at her citizenship ceremony."

"Sections 19 and 20 of the Citizenship Regulation states that in the normal course the Oath of Citizenship given in Canada will be taken in a citizenship ceremony hosted in public before a citizenship judge appointed by the Governor in Council pursuant to section 26 of the Act." In December 2011 policy was added which requires "candidates who wear full or partial face coverings to remove them during recitation of the oath."

On September 15, 2015, Justice Department lawyer Peter Southey explained to the Federal Court of Appeal that while the controversial edict banning the niqāb "was a regulation that had no actual force in law," and that "the government never meant to make it mandatory for women to remove their face coverings for citizenship ceremonies," it "indicates a desire in the strongest possible language." Southey further explained that "the immigration minister was conceding that he "could not impose a mandatory rule in a guideline" for the purposes of this appeal."

Harper's administration was seeking to change the law that would make it illegal to wear a face covering during the citizenship ceremony.

=== Canada (Citizenship and Immigration) v Ishaq ===
In September 15th, 2015 in the case Canada (Citizenship and Immigration) v Ishaq, 2015 FCA 194, the three judges — Justices Johanne Trudel, Wyman Webb and Mary Gleason, who were all appointed by Stephen Harper — ruled in favour of Ishaq "saying they wanted to proceed quickly so that she could "obtain her citizenship in time to vote in the Oct. 19 federal election. The Justices dismissed the Minister of Citizenship and Immigration's appeal and confirmed that the federal requirement is unlawful.

"I find that the appellant has not demonstrated that refusing his application for stay would result in irreparable harm to the public interest. This suffices to dispose of the appellant’s motion for stay."

— Federal Court of Appeal ruling September 15th, 2015

Madam Justice Johanne Trudel was one of three judges who denied the appeal by Jason Kenney on behalf of Department of Citizenship and Immigration of a Federal Court ruling in Ishaq’s favour.

Further the judges found in Canada v Ishaq,

"[20] Presuming that the appellant is right that the Policy at issue is not mandatory and citizenship judges can apply it or not — to use the appellant’s language as expressed by counsel at the hearing of the appeal, that the Policy merely amounts to an encouragement in the strongest language possible — how can one raise a claim of irreparable harm?"

— Federal Court of Appeal ruling September 15th, 2015

In October 2015, the federal government under Harper asked the Supreme Court of Canada to take up the case and pleaded for the Federal Court of Appeal to suspend its ruling in the meantime. On November 16th, 2015 Justice Minister Wilson-Raybould formally withdrew the court challenge as her first act as minister.

=== Policy and the law ===
On March 10, 2015 Prime Minister Stephen Harper explained that the reason the Conservative government is fighting to ban the niqāb during Canadian citizenship ceremonies is that it is "rooted in a culture that is anti-women."

In Quebec in June 2015 Prime Minister Stephen Harper addressed a crowd claiming that Canadians "want new citizens to take the oath with their faces uncovered."

Under current Canadian laws, Minister Jason Kenney "does not have the power to unilaterally fetter the discretion of citizenship judges." However, the Harper administration would "pass legislation to enshrine a ban in law." If that should happen the next step would be to test the law by the standards of the Canadian Charter of Rights and Freedoms – "the standard that would seem most difficult for this ban to meet" and which would result in a "Charter challenge."

During the 2015 Canadian federal election, Tom Mulcair's stance on the niqab issue contributed to a decline in the party's support in Quebec.

While the Conservative Party of Canada supported banning face covering only during citizenship ceremony, the Bloc Québécois supported banning the face covering during citizenship ceremony and voting.

Polling found widespread support for banning face covering during citizenship ceremony. A survey by Léger Marketing found 82% of Canadians favoured the policy somewhat or strongly, with just 15% opposed. Support was widespread, but especially strong in Quebec, where 93% were in favour of the requirement.

=== Commentary ===
Alia Hogben, executive director of the Canadian Council of Muslim Women, argued that based on their survey of the 80 women in Ontario, Canada who do wear the niqāb, all of them agreed they would uncover their face "when necessary for security or identification reasons." Hogben explained that "women are not required under Islam to cover their faces, and none of the women in her organization wear niqābs."

Scholar Lara Mazurski writes that the debate "recycles tired Orientalist tropes and reinvigorates stereotypes about veiled Muslim women post September 11". Muslim women are stereotyped as "subordinated and victimized, women in full-face veils are thus envisioned as backwards and inferior".

Journalist Barbara Kay argues that it is fallacious to compare the niqāb with other cultural or religious symbols such as the Sikh turban (Dastar), the wimple of a nun or the long skirts worn by Orthodox Jewish women as these do not cover the face. Kay also dismissed the "religious faith" argument since not all devout Muslim women wear the niqāb; it is banned in some Islamic countries but not in all Islamic countries; and virtually "all Islamic scholars have noted that Sharia does not demand face cover."
