= Bois-Blanc, New Brunswick =

Coordinates: 47.618893°N 65.07906°W

Location of Bois-Blanc in New Brunswick

Bois-Blanc is a settlement in New Brunswick. The community is located mainly on Route 135.

== See also ==
- List of communities in New Brunswick
