= Cherry Hill, Michigan =

- Cherry Hill Historic District
- U.S. National Register of Historic Places
- U.S. Historic district
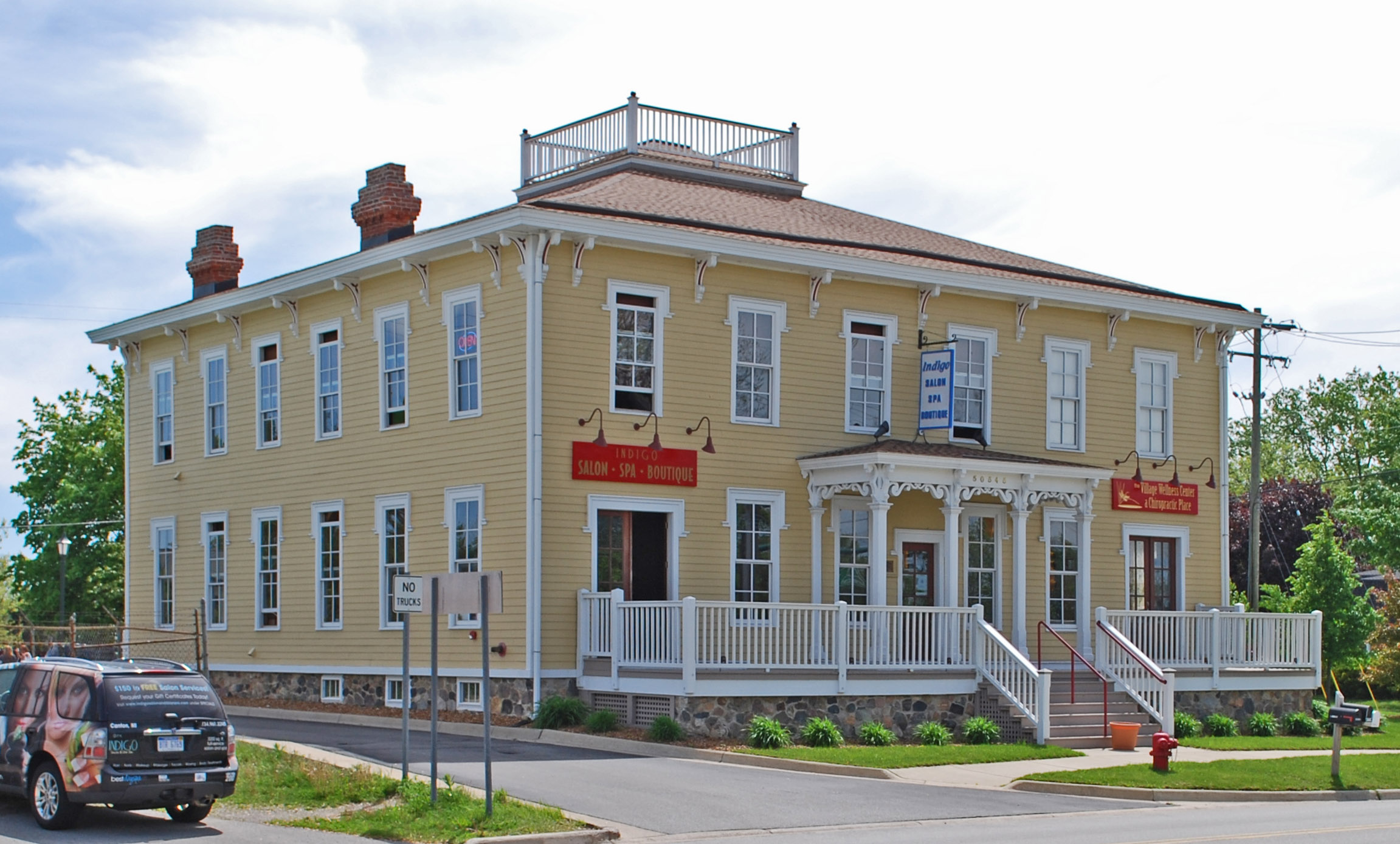
- The Italianate Cherry Hill House, Corner of Ridge and Cherry Hill

- Location within Michigan Location within the United States
- Interactive map
- Location: Cherry Hill and Ridge Rds., Canton Township, Michigan
- Coordinates: 42°18′17″N 83°32′20″W
- Area: 17 acres (6.9 ha)
- Built: 1865
- Architectural style: Gothic Revival, Italianate
- NRHP reference No.: 03000176
- Added to NRHP: April 02, 2003

Cherry Hill is an unincorporated community in Wayne County in the U.S. state of Michigan. The community is located within Canton Township along Cherry Hill and Ridge Roads but otherwise has no legally defined boundaries or population statistics. The Cherry Hill Historic District is a primarily residential historic district encompassing the greater part of Cherry Hill. It was listed on the National Register of Historic Places in 2003.

== History ==
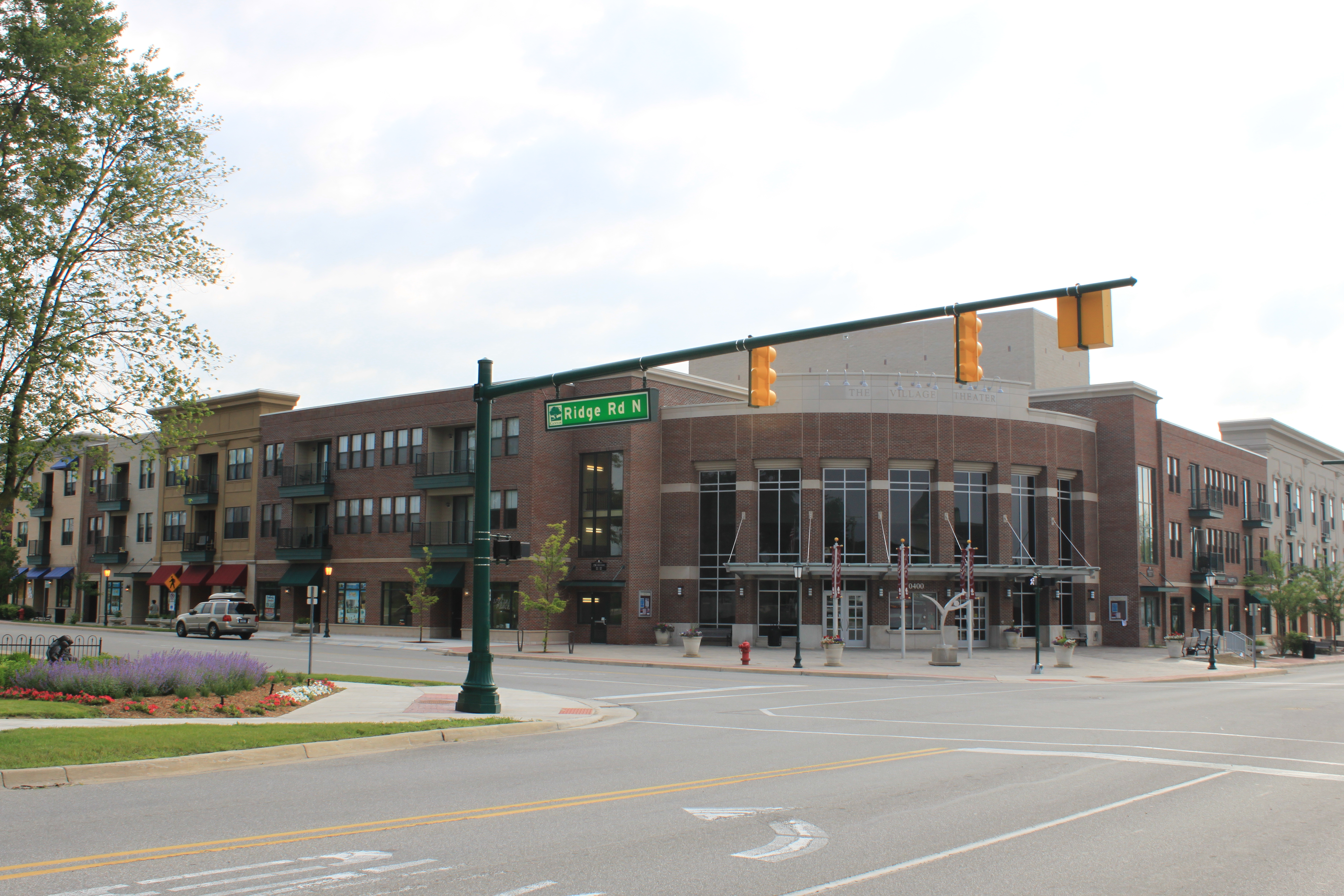
The Village Theatre

Cherry Hill, settled in 1825, was an early crossroads hamlet in Canton Township. The town was originally called "Ridge" (also the origin of "Ridge Road") due to its position atop the ridge shore of an ancient lake. The first area church, the Cherry Hill United Methodist Church, was built in the village in 1834. In approximately 1865, Abner Hitchcock constructed an inn in the village, naming it the "Cherry Hill House" in reference to the wild cherry trees growing in the area. The town of Ridge soon followed suit, and changed its name to "Cherry Hill." Hitchcock's inn was used later as a general store and a dance hall, becoming the social center of the community for generations.

The Ypsi Creamery was located in Cherry Hill, after which the Detroit Creamery (later the Wilson Dairy) operated until 1940. Henry Ford purchased the dairy and used it to house workers in his village industry program. The village industry in Cherry Hill was unique in that part of its purpose was to provide work for World War II veterans who suffered physical or mental disabilities due to their wartime service.

Cherry Hill is the last of the five hamlets in Canton Township to retain substantial historic significance; it also endured as a commercial and social hub until the 1960s.

== Community development ==
In 2000, construction began on the Cherry Hill Village residential development in the area. The development included over 750 houses, parks, and a town center with a community theatre. The development emphasized traditional architecture and site plans to evoke a neotraditional small-town feel.

== Historic District description ==
The Cherry Hill Historic District contains buildings facing Cherry Hill and Ridge Roads near their intersection. These include the Cherry Hill House, the only Italianate building in the township, the Gothic Revival Cherry Hill United Methodist Church and associated cemetery, the Cherry Hill School, the Thomas and Maria Blackman Bartlett House, the Thomas and Isabella Moore Clyde House, buildings used for one of Henry Ford's Village Industry projects, and other farmhouses and associated outbuildings in the area.

- Canton Fractional School District No. 1 Schoolhouse
- U.S. Historic district – Contributing property
- Michigan State Historic Site
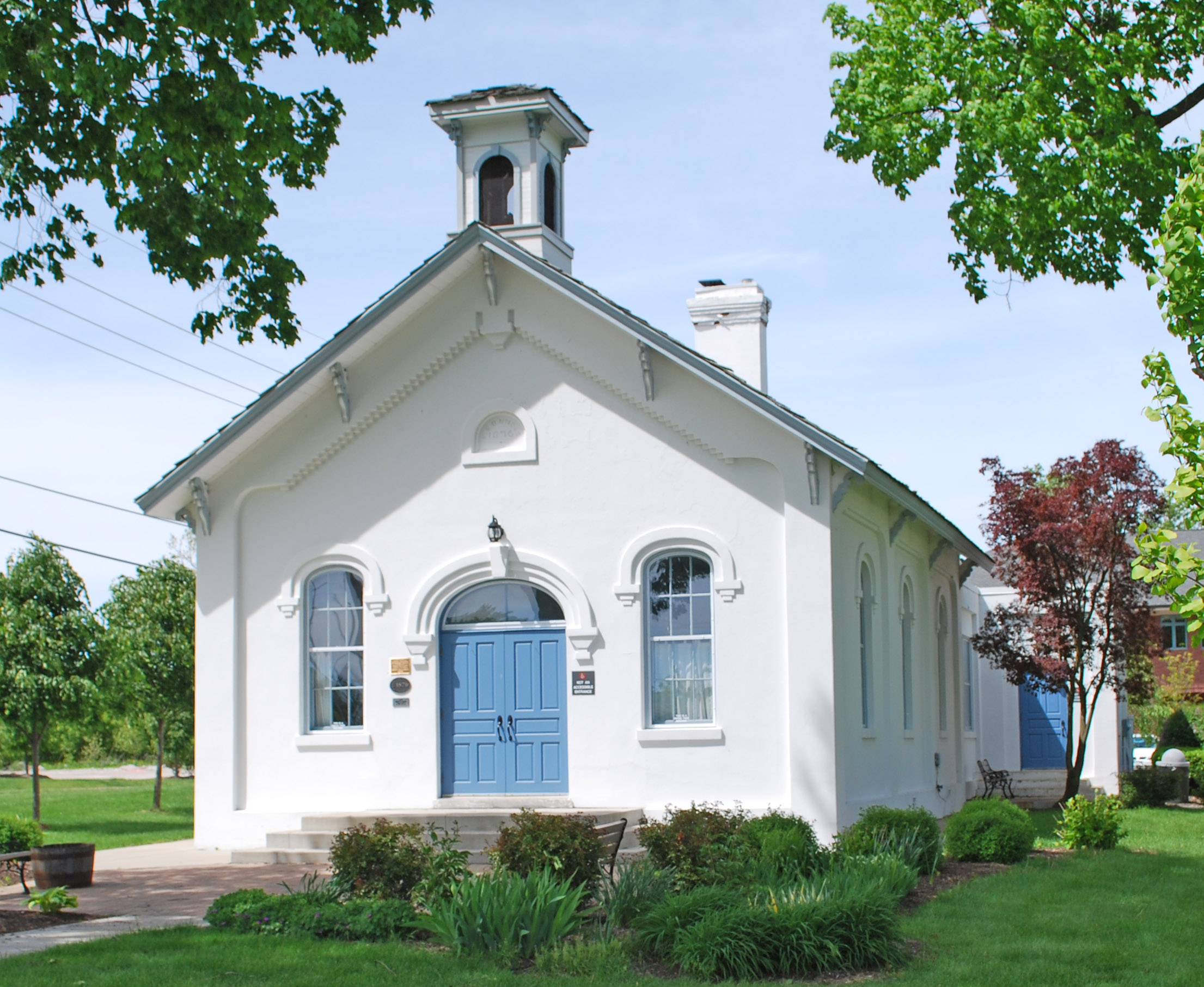
- Cherry Hill School

- Location within Michigan Location within the United States
- Location: Cherry Hill and Ridge Rds., Canton Township, Michigan
- Built: 1876
- Part of: Cherry Hill Historic District (ID03000176)
- Designated MSHS: March 16, 1989

- Cherry Hill United Methodist Church
- U.S. Historic district – Contributing property
- Michigan State Historic Site
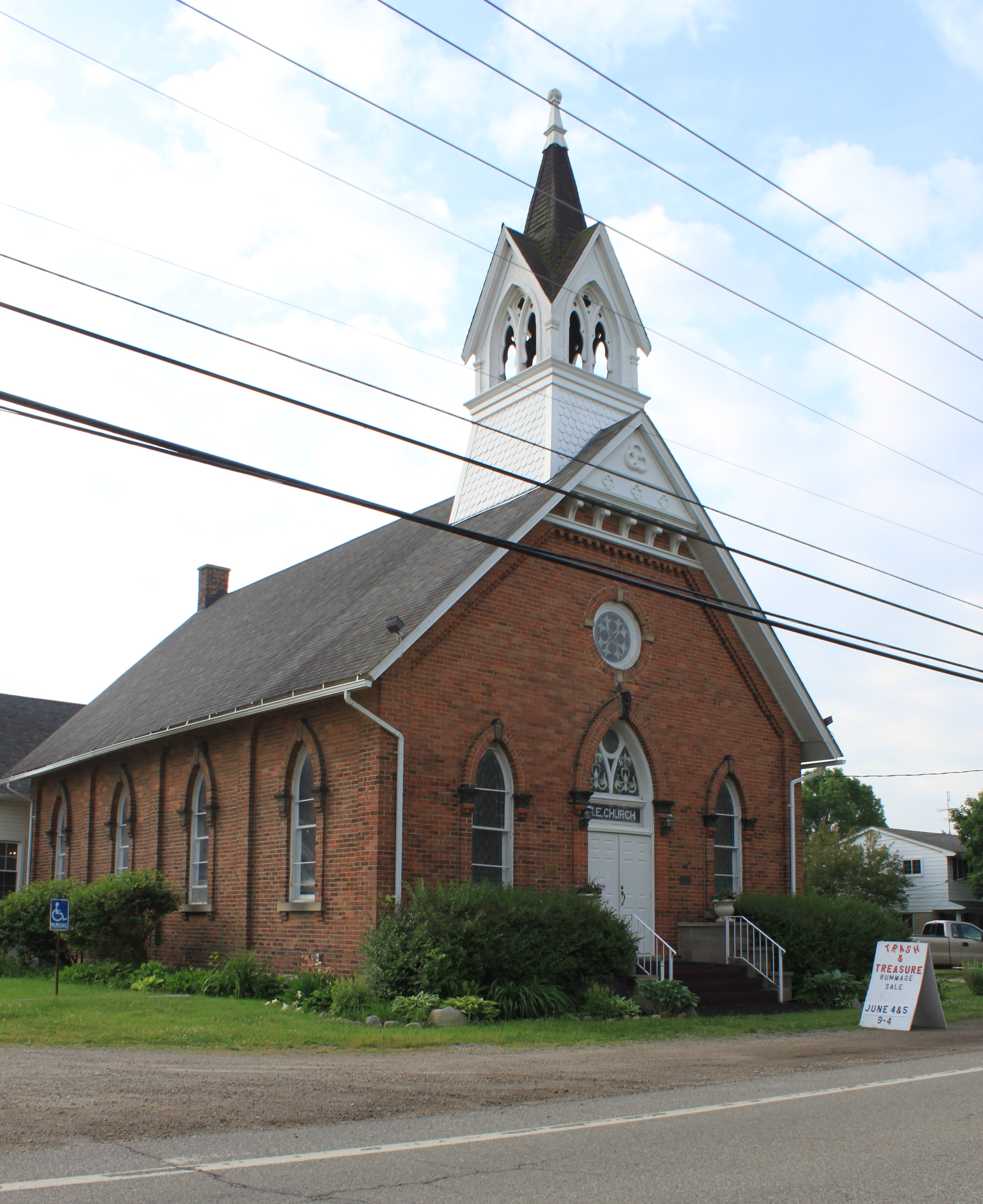
- Cherry Hill United Methodist Church

- Location within Michigan Location within the United States
- Location: Cherry Hill and Ridge Rds., Canton Township, Michigan
- Built: 1882
- Part of: Cherry Hill Historic District (ID03000176)
- Designated MSHS: July 29, 1980
