= Notre-Dame-des-Érables =

Coordinates: 47.638°N 65.240°W

Location of Notre-Dame-des-Érables in New Brunswick

Notre-Dame-des-Érables is an unincorporated community in Gloucester County, New Brunswick, on Route 340. The community is within the former local service district of the Paroisse Notre-Dame-des-Érables, which was often shortened to the same name.

== Demographics ==
In the 2021 Census of Population conducted by Statistics Canada, Notre-Dame-des-Érables had a population of 767 living in 359 of its 396 total private dwellings, a change of −8% from its 2016 population of 834. With a land area of 89.44 km^{2} (34.53 sq mi), it had a population density of 8.6/km^{2} (22.2/sq mi) in 2021.

Population of Notre-Dame-des-Érables
Name	Parish	Population (2021)	Population (2016)	Change	Land area (km^{2})	Population density
Notre-Dame-des-Érables part A	Paquetville	723	782	−7.5%	78.11	9.3/km^{2}
Notre-Dame-des-Érables part B	New Bandon	44	52	−15.4%	11.33	3.9/km^{2}
Total	—	767	834	−8.0%	89.44	8.6/km^{2}

== See also ==
- List of communities in New Brunswick
