= Thomas and Maria Blackman Bartlett House =

Historic house in Michigan, United States

- U.S. National Register of Historic Places
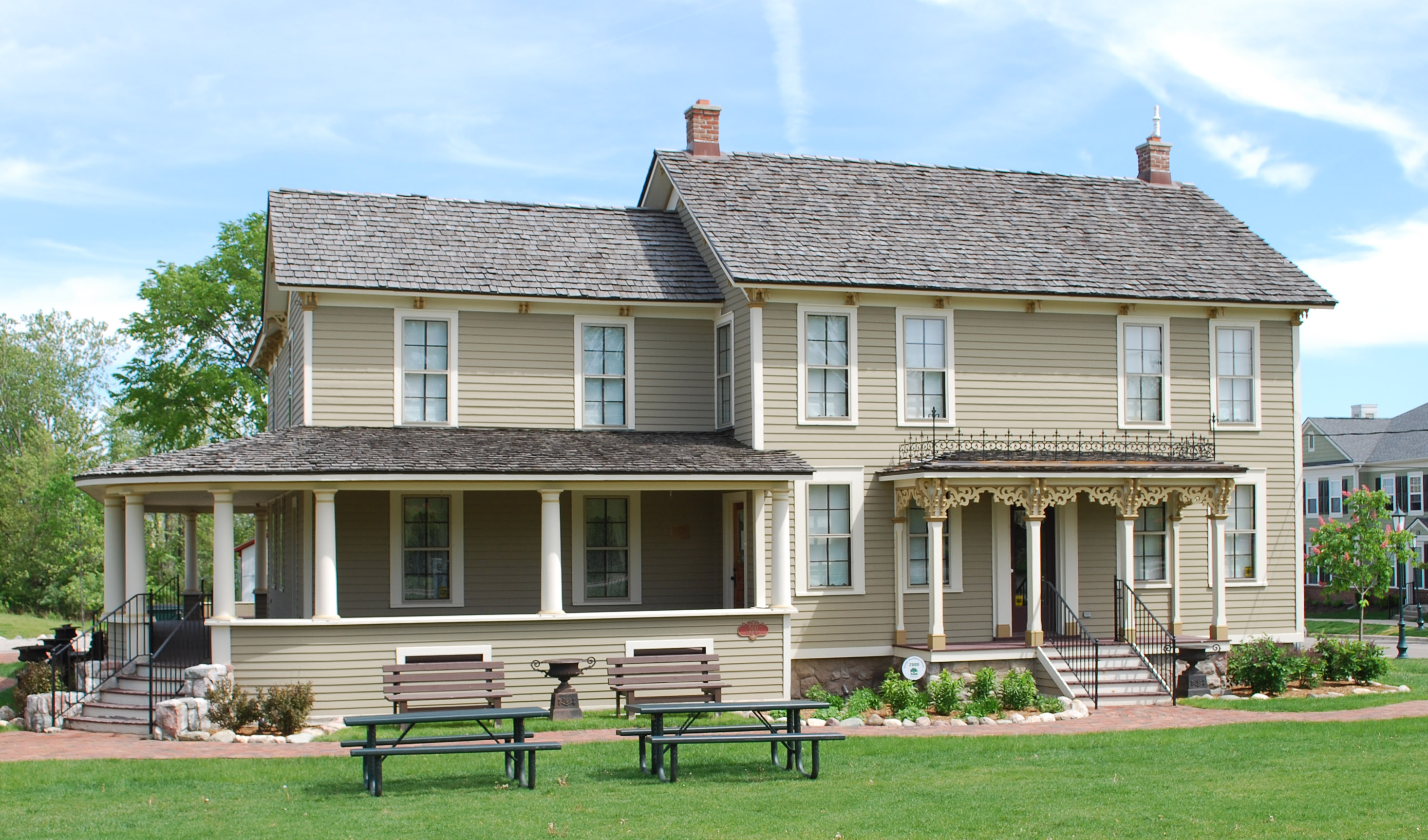

- Location within Michigan Location within the United States
- Interactive map
- Location: 500 N. Ridge Rd.
- Nearest city: Cherry Hill, Michigan
- Coordinates: 42°18′30″N 83°32′5″W
- Area: 1 acre (0.40 ha)
- Built: 1840
- Architectural style: New England large house
- MPS: Canton Township MPS
- NRHP reference No.: 00000614
- Added to NRHP: June 02, 2000

The Thomas and Maria Blackman Bartlett House (also known as the Bartlett-Travis House) was built as a private house at the corner of Canton Center and Warren Roads. It was donated to Canton Township and relocated to its current site at 500 N. Ridge Road in Cherry Hill, Michigan. It was listed on the National Register of Historic Places in 2000.

== Description ==
The Bartlett House was originally constructed in a Greek Revival style, but in subsequent years has been updated with Victorian elements.

The house is a two-story wood structure with clapboard siding, shingle roof, and a cement block foundation faced with fieldstone. The main portion of the house has extensions to the side and rear. The front entry is flanked with pilasters and sheltered by a small porch with millwork and scrolled brackets. A large wrap-around porch (reconstructed from photographs) with wooden columns and balustrade runs from the front to the south facade. Windows are primarily four-over-four, with the exception of three six-over-six windows in the rear extension.

== History ==
Thomas and Maria Blackman Bartlett settled in Canton Township in 1839. Maria's father, Darius Blackman, built this Greek Revival upright and wing house c. 1840 and may have given the house and surrounding land to Maria and Thomas as a wedding present. In 1867, Thomas and Maria's son George Bartlett purchased the property. During the 19th century, various enlargements were added to the structure. In 1908, the farm and house were purchased by William and Martha Travis; their daughter Ella Rowe inherited the house in approximately 1924 and owned it until the mid-1950s. At that point, the house was purchased by Thomas Myers; it passed through the hands of John Darakijan and Kev Dividock, who donated the house to Canton Township. In 1989, the house was moved to its current location and placed on a new foundation. Restoration work to return the house to its c. 1900 appearance was begun in 1994 and finished in 2002. The house was listed on the National Register of Historic Places in 2000.

The house is available for community rental.

== See also ==
- Canton Township MPS
- Canton Charter Township, Michigan
