= Sheldon Inn =

Historic inn in Michigan, United States

- U.S. National Register of Historic Places
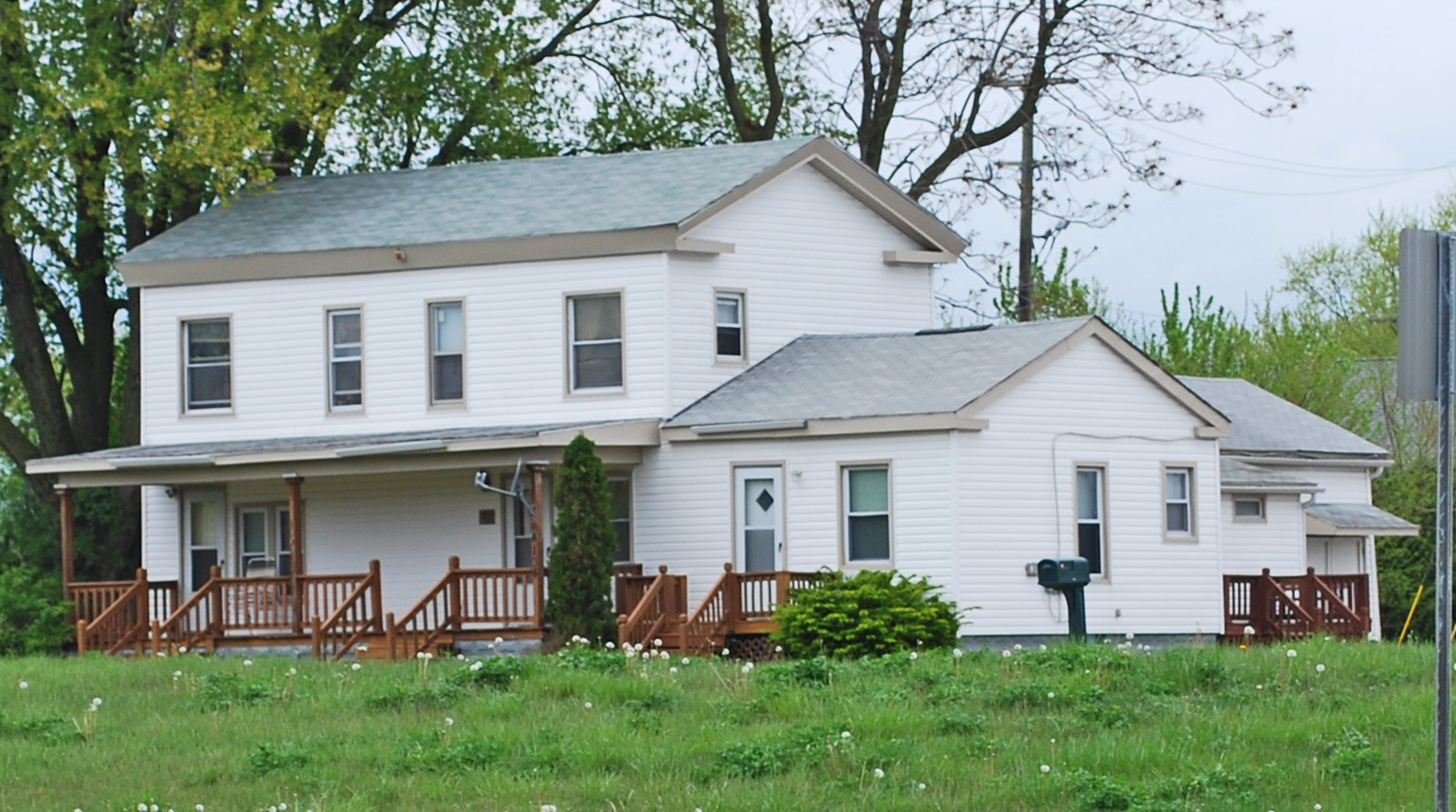

- Location within Michigan Location within the United States
- Interactive map
- Location: 44134 Michigan Avenue, Canton Township, Michigan
- Nearest city: Sheldon, Michigan
- Coordinates: 42°16′31″N 83°28′28″W
- Area: 0.2 acres (0.081 ha)
- Built: 1825
- Architectural style: Greek Revival
- Demolished: January 2021
- MPS: Canton Township MPS
- NRHP reference No.: 00000618
- Added to NRHP: June 02, 2000

The Sheldon Inn was a two-story apartment building located at 44134 Michigan Avenue, in Sheldon Corners in Canton Township, Michigan. It was built in 1825, and previously used as a single-family home and a travelers' inn. It was listed on the National Register of Historic Places in 2000. It was demolished in 2021.

== History ==
The Sheldon Inn was built by Timothy and Rachel Sheldon. The couple moved from Monroe County, New York, with all their possessions in a wagon. They had intended to settle further to the west, but when they camped for the night on the Chicago Road, two days from Detroit, they were impressed with the surrounding area and decided to settle there in Canton Township. On June 6, 1825, the couple purchased 160 acres (65 ha) near their overnight camping spot, including the property on which this building now sits. They were the third landowners in Sheldon Township, filing their claim only a week after the first two.

The Sheldons built a Greek Revival home on their land, and the building almost immediately became an inn, serving the influx of travellers and settlers spreading westward from Detroit. The Sheldons farmed the surrounding land, and soon the hamlet of Sheldon Corners grew around the inn. Sheldon's Corners soon became a thriving community, helped in part by the 1829 establishment of South Territorial Road (now Geddes Road), which began at Sheldon's Corners. South Territorial was established by legislative act, reading in part:

Be it enacted by the Legislative Council of the Territory of Michigan, That there shall be a territorial road laid out and established commencing in the Chicago Road, at or near the Inn of Timothy S. Sheldon, in the township of Plymouth, in the county of Wayne, thence west on the most direct and eligible route, through the village of Ann Arbor, by Samuel Clements' to Grand River, where the St. Joseph Trail crosses the same, and also through the Coghwagiac and Grand praries, thence westerly on the most eligible route to, or near the Paw Paw, to the mouth of the St. Joseph River of Lake Michigan...

In 1830, Timothy Sheldon became postmaster of the area's post office, and the next year, Rachel Sheldon purchased an additional 80 acres (32 ha) adjacent to this property. The hamlet eventually boasted a log schoolhouse, two general stores, two churches, a cemetery, a cobbler and three blacksmiths.

The Sheldons added a one-story wing to the house in the 1830s for an unmarried sister. Timothy Sheldon served as a state legislator in 1839 and Director of the Poor in 1841 and 1845. The ownership of the Sheldon Inn eventually passed to Charles Sines, Timothy Sheldon's nephew, who sold the house to Charles and Anne Morton c. 1890.

The former Sheldon Inn was turned into a two-unit apartment building. The building was demolished in January 2021 as part of a parking lot expansion.

== Description ==
The Sheldon Inn was a two-story, side-gable Greek Revival house located on a 1/4 acre lot, and sitting a few feet behind what was once its original location. The house had been altered since its construction, but still exhibited the Greek Revival cornice return detail on the side gable. It had an 1830s one-story addition, and a porch running the width of the house that was added in the 1930s. Two small additions were located in the rear.

== See also ==
- Canton Township MPS
- Canton Charter Township, Michigan
