= Art Gallery Building =

- U.S. National Register of Historic Places
- U.S. Historic district – Contributing property
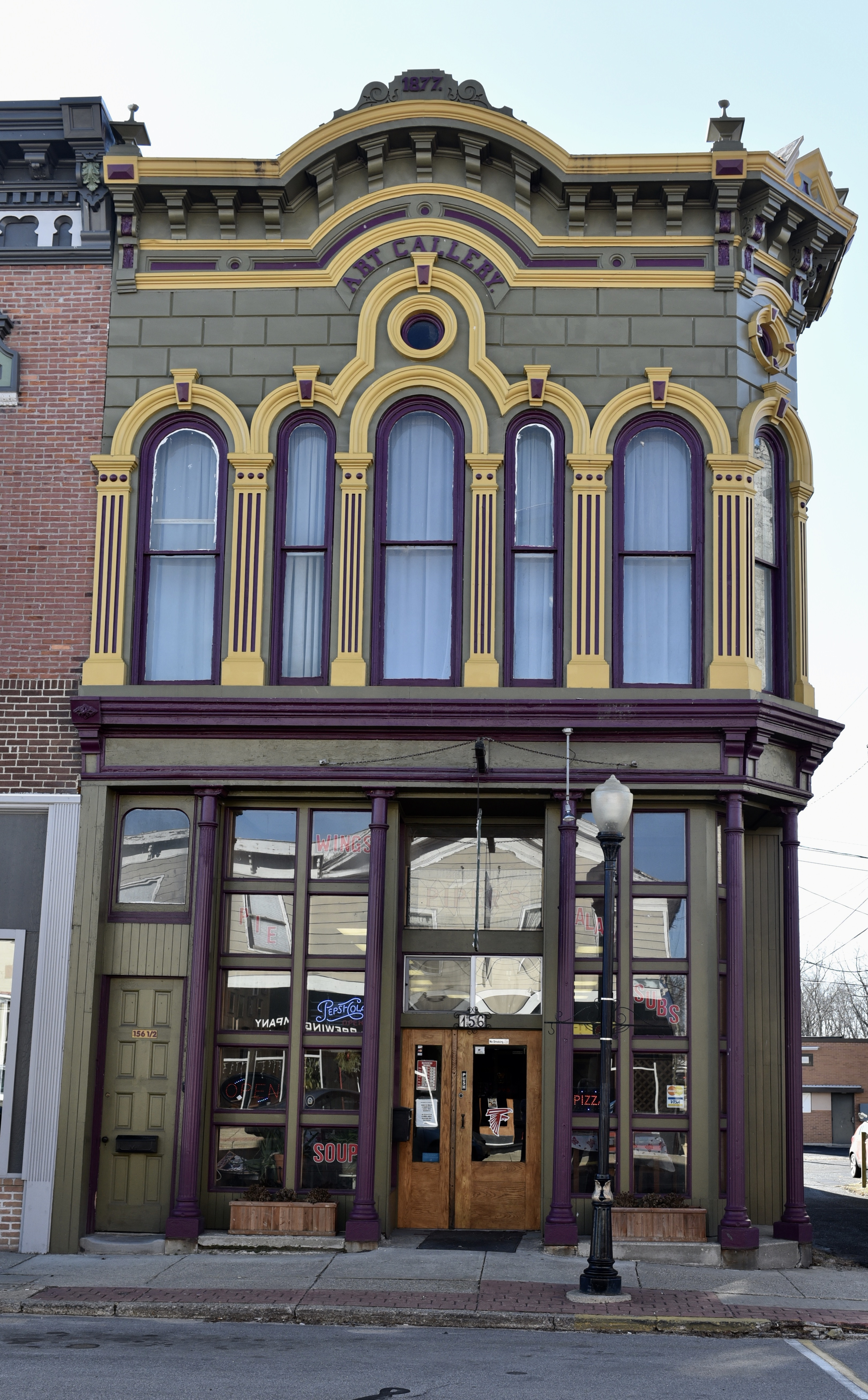

- Location within Michigan Location within the United States
- Interactive map
- Location: 156 S. Washington St., Constantine, Michigan
- Coordinates: 41°50′29″N 85°40′8″W
- Area: less than one acre
- Built: 1877
- Architectural style: Italianate
- Part of: Constantine Historic Commercial District (ID85002444)
- NRHP reference No.: 80004070
- Added to NRHP: May 9, 1980

The Art Gallery Building is a commercial building located at 156 South Washington Street in Constantine, Michigan. It was listed on the National Register of Historic Places in 1980. The building is particularly notable for its cast iron Italianate upper facade—the only such building in Constantine and perhaps the only one in the entire region.

== History ==
The Art Gallery Building was constructed in 1877 for George I. Crossett to house his Crossett Drug Store on the first floor, along with a photographic studio on the second floor. The studios on the second floor led to the name of the building. Over time, the second floor space was occupied by photographic studios operated by Arthur Swain, G. T. Stephens, D. C. Moyer, among others up until the 1920. A series of pharmacies occupied the first floor until the 1960s. A fire in 1970 destroyed some of the lower floor trim.

== Description ==
The Art Gallery Building is a two-story narrow-fronted red brick, Italianate commercial building, with a roof that slants slightly downward toward the back. The building is located adjacent to a small alleyway. The cast iron facade contains an arcade-like set of round-head windows topped by faux masonry. A bracketed iron cornice above has a round-gable center section inset with the building's name and date of construction. Atop the cornice line are rectangular urns with ball finials.

== See also ==
- National Register of Historic Places in St. Joseph County, Michigan
