= Phillip and Maria Hasselbach Dingledey House =

Historic house in Michigan, United States

- U.S. National Register of Historic Places
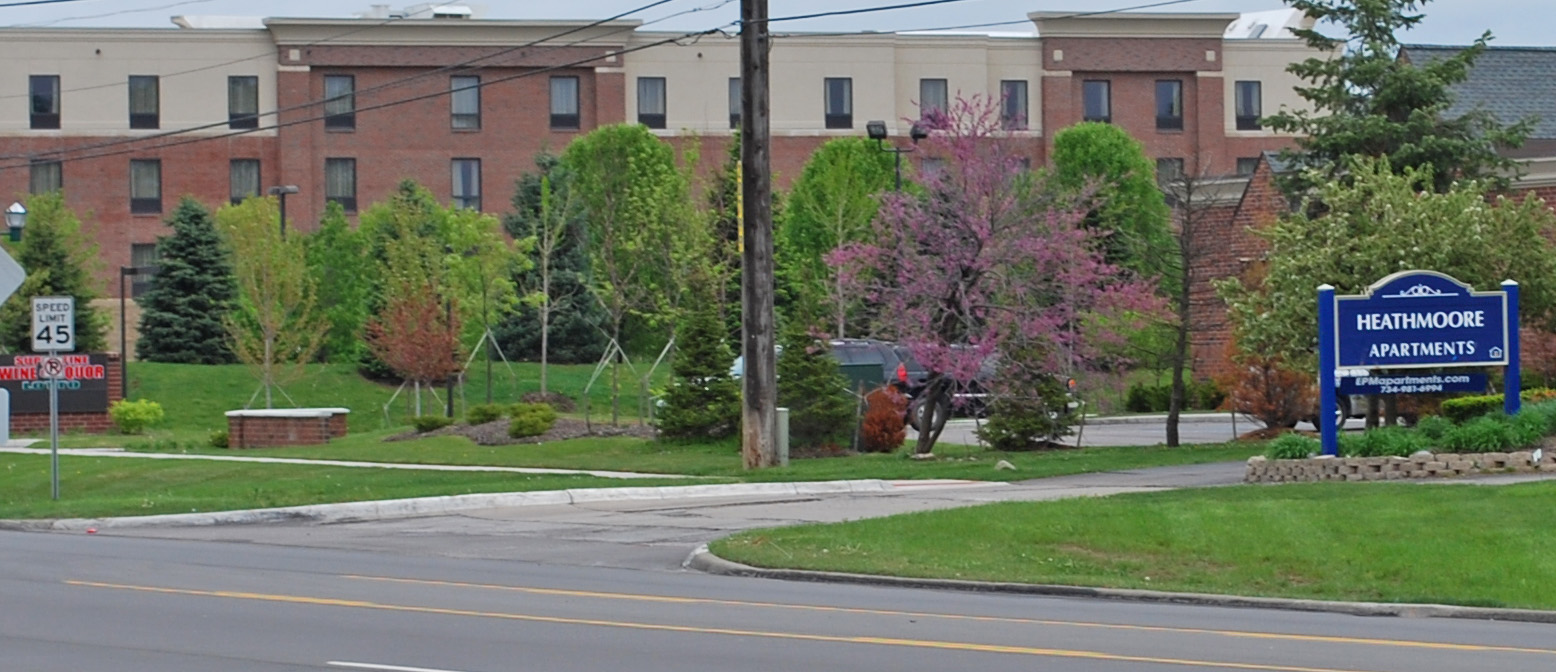
- Former site of the Phillip and Maria Hasselbach Dingledey House

- Location within Michigan Location within the United States
- Interactive map
- Location: 1638 Haggerty Road, Canton Township, Michigan
- Nearest city: Westland, Michigan
- Coordinates: 42°19′6″N 83°26′55″W
- Area: 1.1 acres (0.45 ha)
- Built: 1881
- Architectural style: Upright and wing house
- MPS: Canton Township MPS
- NRHP reference No.: 00000616
- Added to NRHP: June 02, 2000

The Phillip and Maria Hasselbach Dingledey House was a private house located at 1638 Haggerty Road, near Westland in Canton Township, Michigan. It was listed on the National Register of Historic Places in 2000. The house is no longer at its listed location; a small commercial complex now occupies the site.

== Description ==
The Phillip and Maria Hasselbach Dingledey House was an upright and wing style farmhouse with a relatively unusual double upright. The one-story wing section was located between a two-story front-gabled upright section and a 1 1/2-story front-gabled upright section. The house, constructed in 1881, included Italianate and Greek Revival detail elements. It was made from wood, with clapboard siding, on a rubble stone foundation. The recessed porch on the central wing had columns and brackets under the eaves.

== Phillip and Maria Hasselbach Dingledey ==
Phillip Dingledey was born in Germany in 1831 and came to the United States when he was 15. He first settled in Buffalo, New York, and later came to Michigan. Philip's first wife died, and in 1861 he married Maria Hasselbach. The couple had a farm on Haggerty Road near palmer Road, but in 1881 they purchased land farther north along Haggerty and built this house. Phillip Dingledey died in 1899 and his wife Maria followed in 1909.

== See also ==
- Canton Township MPS
- Canton Charter Township, Michigan
