= George and Mary Pine Smith House =

Historic house in Michigan, United States

- U.S. National Register of Historic Places
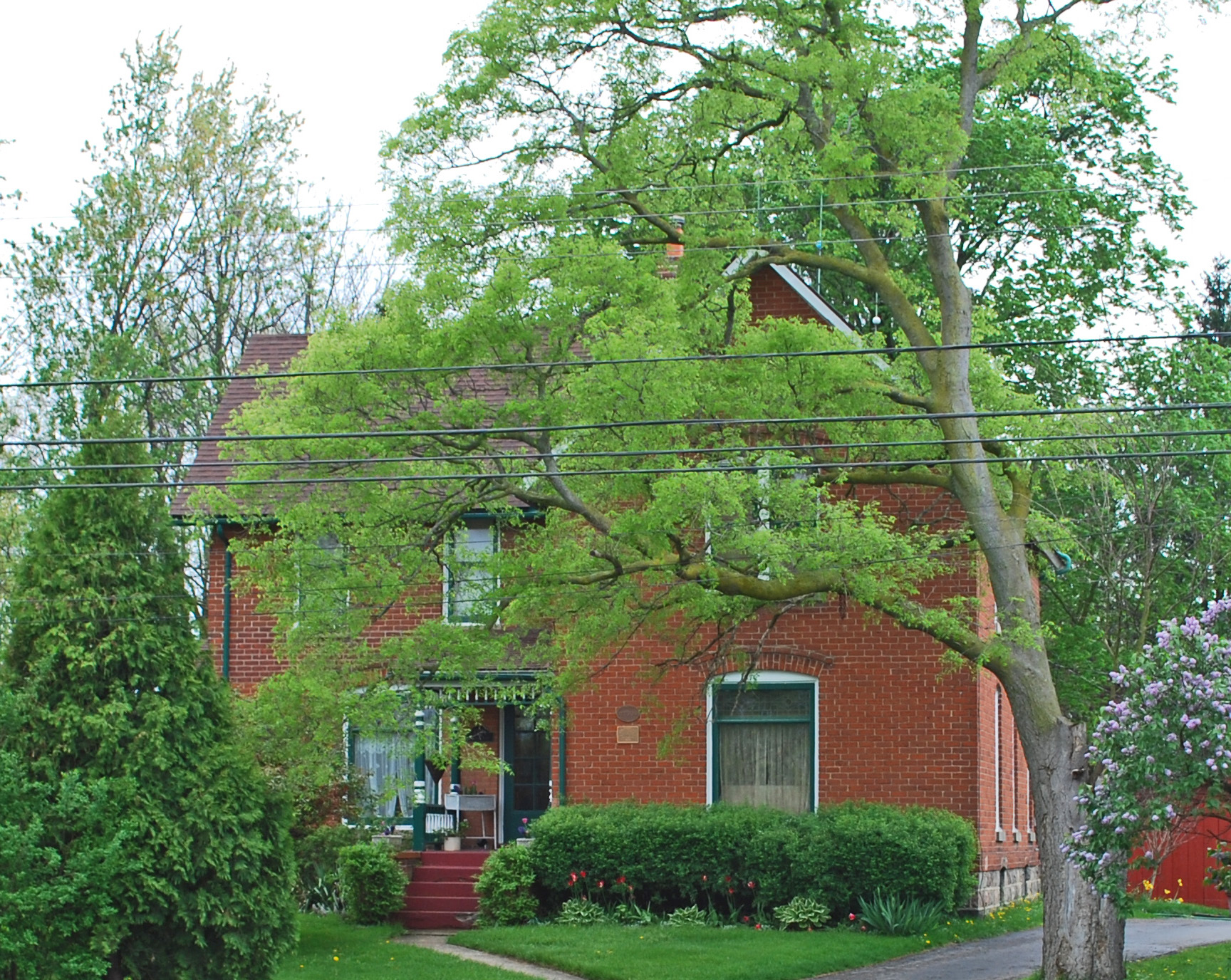

- Location within Michigan Location within the United States
- Interactive map
- Location: 3704 Sheldon Road, Canton Township, Michigan
- Nearest city: Sheldon, Michigan
- Coordinates: 42°16′47″N 83°28′37″W
- Area: 0.6 acres (0.24 ha)
- Built: 1904
- Architectural style: Gabled-ell house
- MPS: Canton Township MPS
- NRHP reference No.: 00000619
- Added to NRHP: June 02, 2000

The George and Mary Pine Smith House is a private house located at 3704 Sheldon Road, near Sheldon in Canton Township, Michigan. It was listed on the National Register of Historic Places in 2000.

== History ==
The land this house sits on was first farmed by William Smith of England, who purchased 80 acres (320,000 m^{2}) of land in 1830. In 1835, Smith purchased another 80 acres (320,000 m^{2}) to the east. At some point, William built a log cabin on the property. William Smith and his wife Mary Collins Smith raised seven children on this farm, establishing a long line of Smiths farming in Canton Township.

One of William and Mary Collins Smith's children was George Smith Sr. His son George Jr. (William's grandson) married Mary Pine. In 1904, George Jr. and Mary Smith spent $2,058.76 to build the house that now sits on the property, replacing the log cabin. Although the present acreage is small, outbuildings on the property give the feel of the old farmstead and the wooded edges isolate the house from the surrounding modern developments.

== Description ==
The George and Mary Pine Smith House is a two-story gabled ell building with an additional ell at the rear. The brick house sits on a two-foot-thick fieldstone foundation laid in courses across the facade. Many of the bricks in the walls were handmade at the building site. Two doors in the front facade are covered by a small porch with decorative millwork. The front facade includes a bay window, and two of the other front windows have a transom sash, one with stained glass in the transom area and the other with beveled glass. Three more large transomed windows are in other elevations, and the remainder of the house's windows are narrow one over ones. The windows are topped with a segmental arch formed of corbelled bricks.

== See also ==
- Canton Township MPS
- Canton Charter Township, Michigan
