= Charles G. Curtiss Sr. House =

Historic house in Michigan, United States

- U.S. National Register of Historic Places
- Michigan State Historic Site
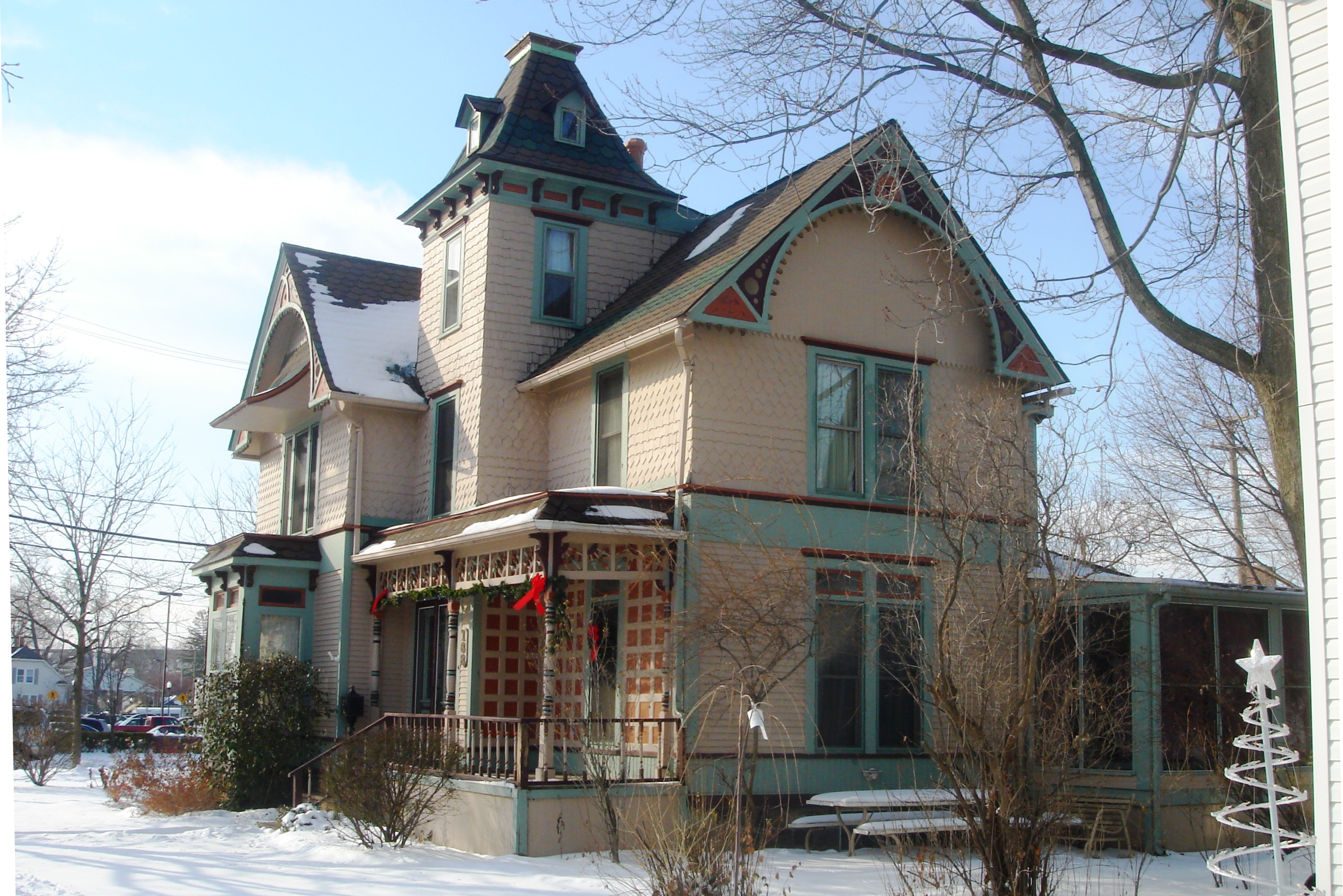

- Location within Michigan Location within the United States
- Interactive map
- Location: 168 S. Union St., Plymouth, Michigan
- Coordinates: 42°22′19″N 83°27′58″W
- Built: 1890
- Built by: Charles G. Curtiss Sr.
- Architectural style: Stick-Eastlake
- NRHP reference No.: 93001350

Significant dates
- Added to NRHP: December 02, 1993
- Designated MSHS: June 20, 1994

The Charles G. Curtiss Sr. House is a private home at 168 S. Union St. in Plymouth, Michigan in the United States. It was listed on the National Register of Historic Places in 1993 and designated a Michigan State Historic Site in 1994.

== History ==
This house was built c. 1890 for Charles G. Curtiss Sr., a builder from Plymouth. Curtiss was born in Connecticut in 1823; he eventually moved to Plymouth and was involved in moving and building houses. It is likely, although not certain, that Curtiss designed and built this house. Curtiss died only a few years later in 1893, and his wife Caroline continued to live in the house until 1901. The mix of architectural features in the house is unique in Plymouth.

== Description ==
The Charles G. Curtiss Sr. House is a two-story wood-framed house sitting on a fieldstone foundation. It is built in a cross-gabled ell shape, with a three-story square tower within the ell. A shed-roof verandah is attached to the front of the house and a single-story hipped-roof addition is in the rear. The exterior of the house is sheathed in clapboard, patterned shingling, and, beneath the veranda, wood panels.

The house is distinctive because of its decorative elements, including the shingling, turned posts on the verandah, and stickwork under the gables. The form of the house (a gabled ell with tower) had been popular regionally and nationally since the 1850s, but by the time this house was built, c. 1890, was much out of fashion.
