= John and Edna Truesdell Fischer Farmstead =

Historic house in Michigan, United States

- U.S. National Register of Historic Places
- U.S. Historic district
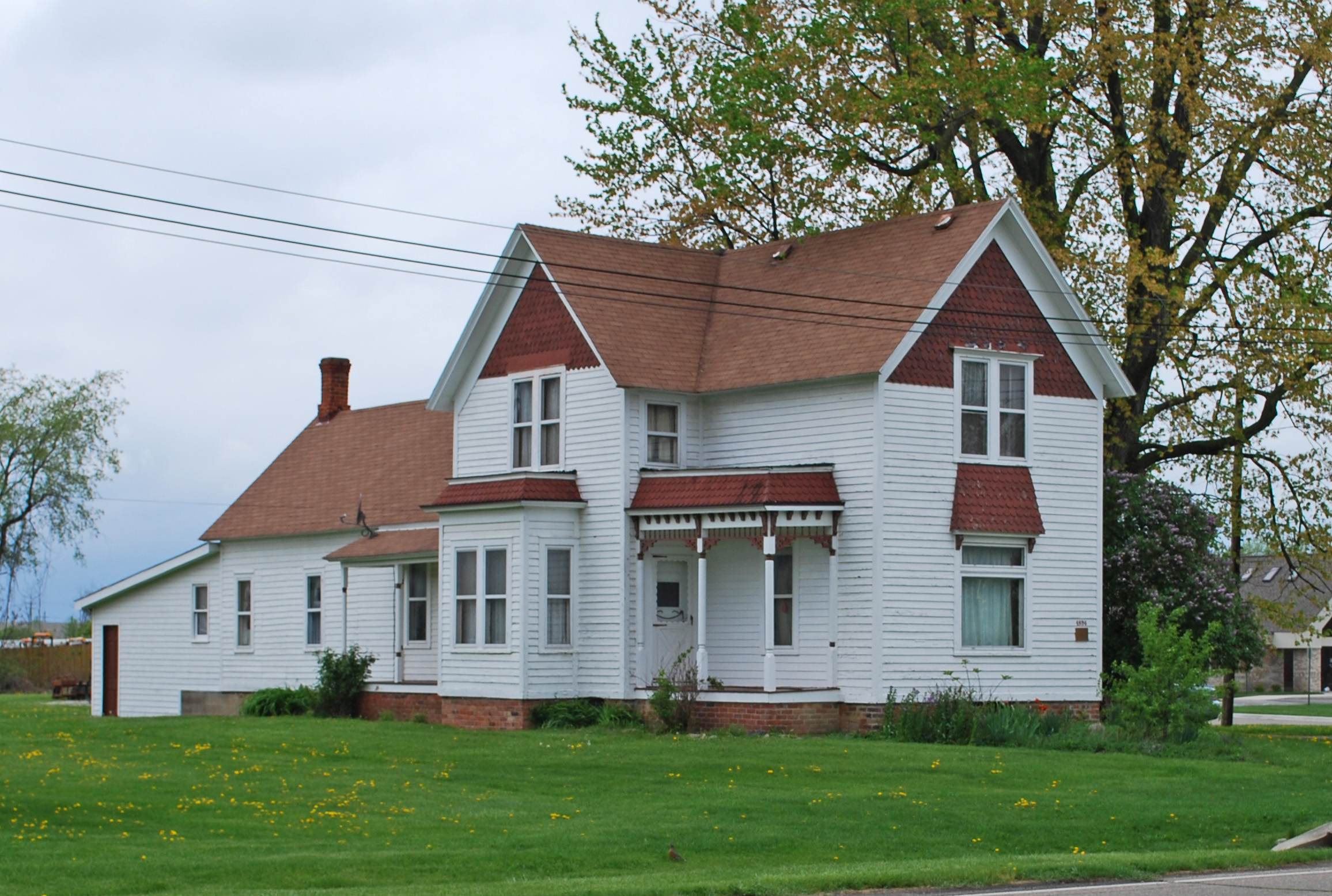
- 1897 Queen Anne house

- Location within Michigan Location within the United States
- Interactive map
- Location: 4896-5228 Sheldon Road, Canton Township, Michigan
- Nearest city: Sheldon, Michigan
- Coordinates: 42°16′10″N 83°28′36″W
- Area: 9.7 acres (3.9 ha)
- Built: 1897
- Architectural style: Queen Anne, Greenhouse
- MPS: Canton Township MPS
- NRHP reference No.: 00000617
- Added to NRHP: June 02, 2000

The John and Edna Truesdell Fischer Farmstead is a private farm, including house and outbuildings, located at 4896-5228 Sheldon Road in Canton Township, Michigan. The 1897 Queen Anne farmhouse located on the site is also known as the Michael and Catherine Hasselbach Fischer House. It was listed on the National Register of Historic Places in 2000.

== Description ==
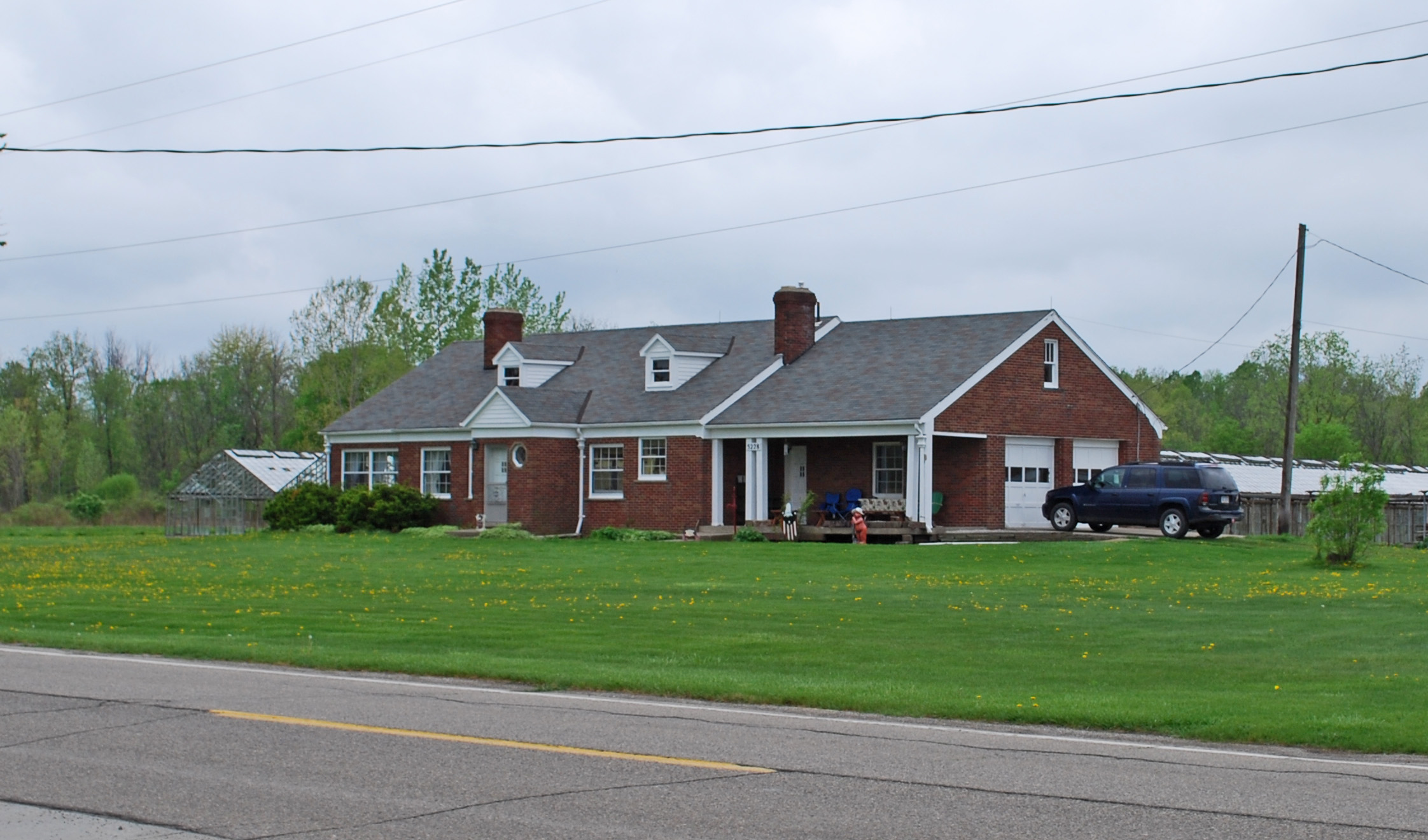
1945 ranch house; greenhouses can be seen to the rear.

The John and Edna Truesdell Fischer Farmstead consists of a ten-acre field with multiple buildings, including an 1897 Queen Anne house, a 1945 ranch house, 18 greenhouses, a boiler house, and a modern garage. The remains of a barn, silo, and milkhouse are also located on the property. The greenhouses are gable-end bays covered with paned glass, and were constructed in the 1940s for market farming.

The 1897 Queen Anne style house is typical of the style, but is relatively unusual in the local area where gabled-ell and upright-and-wing farmhouses were more popular through the turn of the century. The house has a cross plan, and the exterior contains typical Queen Anne details such as fishscale shingles and bay windows.

== History ==
Michael Fischer immigrated to the US from Wurttemberg, Germany in 1847 when he was 14 years old; his wife, Catherine Hasselbach, immigrated from Hesse Darmstadt, Germany in 1852. The couple settled in Sheldon Corners where Michael opened a blacksmith shop. In 1862, they purchased the land this farmstead sits on and constructed a house. In 1897 their son John built the Queen Anne house on the property. The quality of the house is significant, in that it attests to the degree of affluence and assimilation attained by these second generation farmers.

== See also ==
- Canton Township MPS
- Canton Charter Township, Michigan
