= Ephraim and Emma Woodworth Truesdell House =

Historic house in Michigan, United States

- U.S. National Register of Historic Places
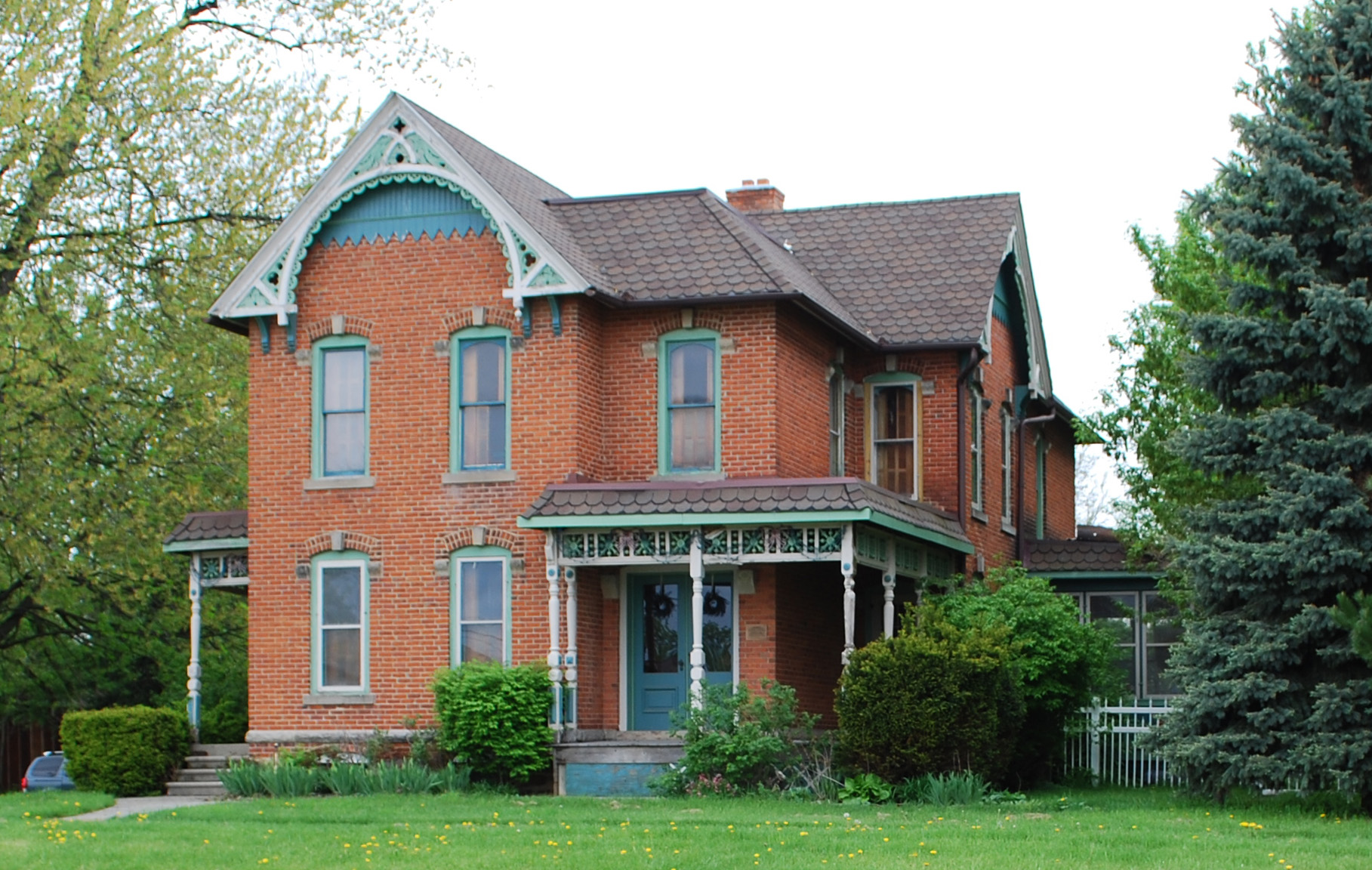

- Location within Michigan Location within the United States
- Interactive map
- Location: 1224 Haggerty Rd., Canton Township, Michigan
- Coordinates: 42°17′56″N 83°26′54″W
- Area: 2.3 acres (0.93 ha)
- Built: 1888
- Built by: Charles W. Curtiss
- Architectural style: Stick-Eastlake
- MPS: Canton Township MPS
- NRHP reference No.: 03000174
- Added to NRHP: April 02, 2003

The Ephraim and Emma Woodworth Truesdell House is a private house located at 1224 Haggerty Road in Canton Township, Michigan. The structure is significant because it is one of the most finely crafted houses in the township and because of its association with one of the most important families in the area. It was listed on the National Register of Historic Places in 2003.

== History ==
Erastus Truesdell was born in Massachusetts in 1802. Erastus married Calista Merry and moved to Michigan in 1832, one of the first families to settle in Canton Township.

Erastus and Calista had eight children, the seventh of whom was Ephraim F. Truesdell, born in 1842. Ephraim served in the Civil War, and married Emma Woodruff; the couple also had eight children. In 1888, Ephraim and Emma Truesdell hired Charles W. Curtiss, a builder from Plymouth, Michigan, to construct this house. Ephraim died in 1908, and his son Charles purchased the property in 1911.

After Charles died in 1937, his wife rented out rooms in the house to schoolteachers and, during World War II, workers at the nearby Willow Run plant. The house stayed in the family for a number of decades; during this time the house was used for funerals because the large double doors in the front allowed caskets to be easily carried into the house. In the 1980s, developers bought it with the intention of starting a bed and breakfast. The home was resold in 1992 and restored, and in 2003 was listed on the National Register of Historic Places.

== Description ==
The house is a two-story structure constructed of red brick on a stone foundation. It is built in a cross-shaped plan, with a deep gable-front section intersected by a side-gabled section which projects to either side of the main section. A hip roof section containing the double-door main entrance, is nestled in the corner created by the intersecting gabled portions of the structure. A low porch with Stick-Eastlake turned posts and pierced screens wraps around the hip roof section and shelters the front door; a similar porch sits on the opposite side of the front facade. Both side and front gables are ornamented with an incised arch beneath the roofline. A bay window is located on the south side; the remainder of the windows are of the one-over-one double-hung variety, set within segmented-arch brick caps.

== See also ==
- Canton Township MPS
- Canton Charter Township, Michigan
