= Trousdell =

Trousdell is a surname. Notable people with the surname include:

- Arthur Trousdell (born 1981), New Zealand-British basketball player
- Don Trousdell (1937–2017), American graphic designer and artist
- Philip Trousdell (born 1948), British Army officer
