= Trudel, New Brunswick =

Trudel
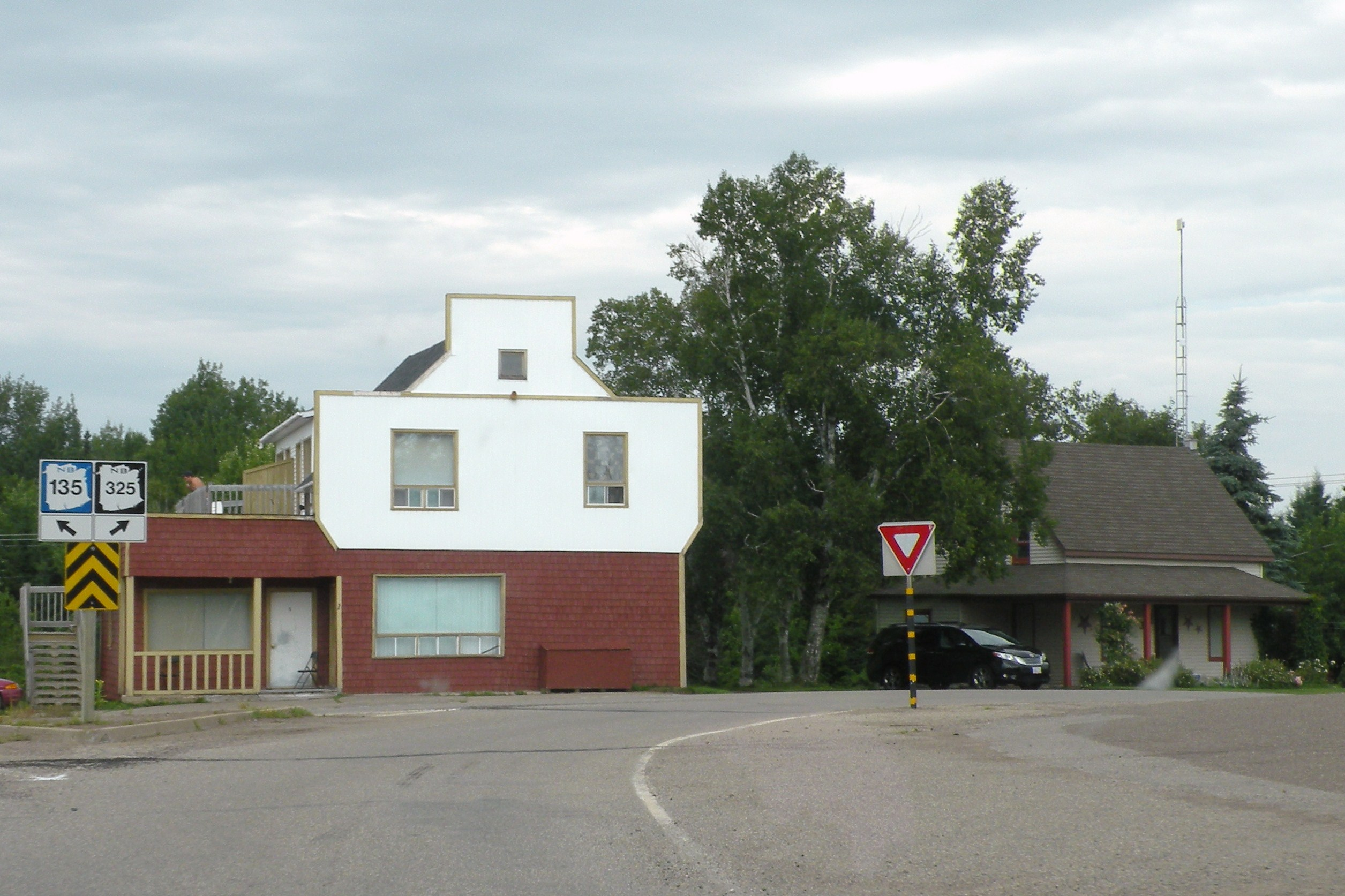
- Intersection of Routes 135 and 325

- Location of Trudel within New Brunswick.
- Coordinates: 47.6923°N 65.1345°W
- Country: Canada
- Province: New Brunswick
- County: Gloucester County
- Parish: Paquetville Parish
- Incorporated: 1904

Government
  - Type: Municipal council

Population (2011)
  - Total: 2,505
- Time zone: UTC−4 (Atlantic (AST))
  - Summer (DST): UTC−3 (Atlantic Daylight Time (ADT))
- Canadian Postal code: E8R
- Area code: 506

Trudel is a Canadian community in Gloucester County, New Brunswick.

Trudel is located on the Acadian Peninsula. The community is centred on the intersection of Route 135 and Route 325 and lies about 2 km north of Paquetville.

== See also ==
- List of communities in New Brunswick
