= Thomas and Isabella Moore Clyde House =

Historic house in Michigan, United States

- U.S. National Register of Historic Places
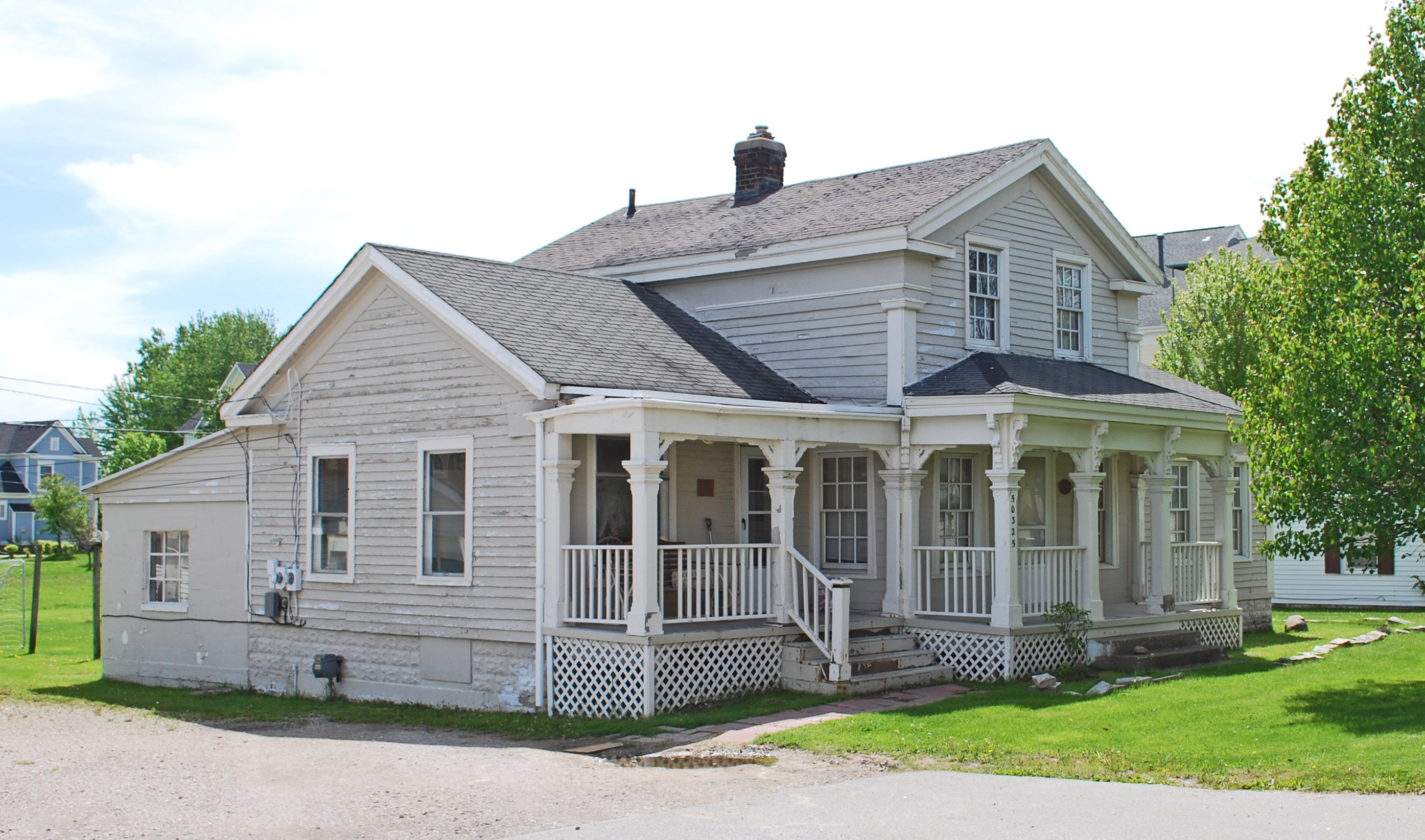

- Location within Michigan Location within the United States
- Interactive map
- Location: 50325 Cherry Hill Rd., Canton Township, Michigan
- Coordinates: 42°18′21″N 83°32′7″W
- Area: 0.8 acres (0.32 ha)
- Built: 1845
- Architectural style: Greek Revival
- MPS: Canton Township MPS
- NRHP reference No.: 03000175
- Added to NRHP: April 02, 2003

The Thomas and Isabella Moore Clyde House is a private house located at 50325 Cherry Hill Road in Canton Township, Michigan. It was listed on the National Register of Historic Places in 2003.

== History ==
Hugh R. Clyde settled in Canton Township in 1825, and in 1826 married Eliza Huston. Hugh R. Clyde died in 1831, and his wife Eliza Huston Clyde died in 1838, when their property went to their son, Thomas. The house was probably built by Thomas Clyde c.1845 as the taxes jumped from $3.14 in 1844 to $8.02 in 1845. Thomas Clyde married Isabella Moore on August 22, 1850, hence "Thomas and Isabella Moore Clyde" House. The Clyde family occupied the house until 1858, when it was purchased by John Huston II, Eliza's nephew. In 1924, the house was purchased by William and Jennie Houk, who lived in it while constructing a new brick house on the property. When their new house was finished, they moved the Clyde House across the street.

== Description ==
The Thomas Clyde House is a 1 1/2-story clapboard upright and wing Greek Revival house on a concrete foundation faced with rock. The two wings form an unusual asymmetric facade. The east wing is positioned flush with the main upright section; the west is recessed to allow for a front porch; a second porch fronts the upright section. The two porches have thick square posts with pierced-work brackets between them. Two front entrances are in the main upright section and the east wing; the windows are six-over-six. The house has ramped door and window surrounds. The roof is covered with asphalt shingles, and the classic cornice below features returns at the gabled ends. This house is significant because the asymmetric upright and wing is an unusual subtype more frequently seen in the northeastern states, and rarely in Michigan.

== See also ==
- Canton Township MPS
- Canton Charter Township, Michigan
