= Territorial Road (Michigan) =

Road in the United States

Territorial Road of Michigan
- St. Joseph Indian Trail; St. Joseph Road; Chicago Road

Route information
- Length: 200 mi (320 km)
- Existed: 1830s–present
- Known for: populating Michigan Territory in the 19th century

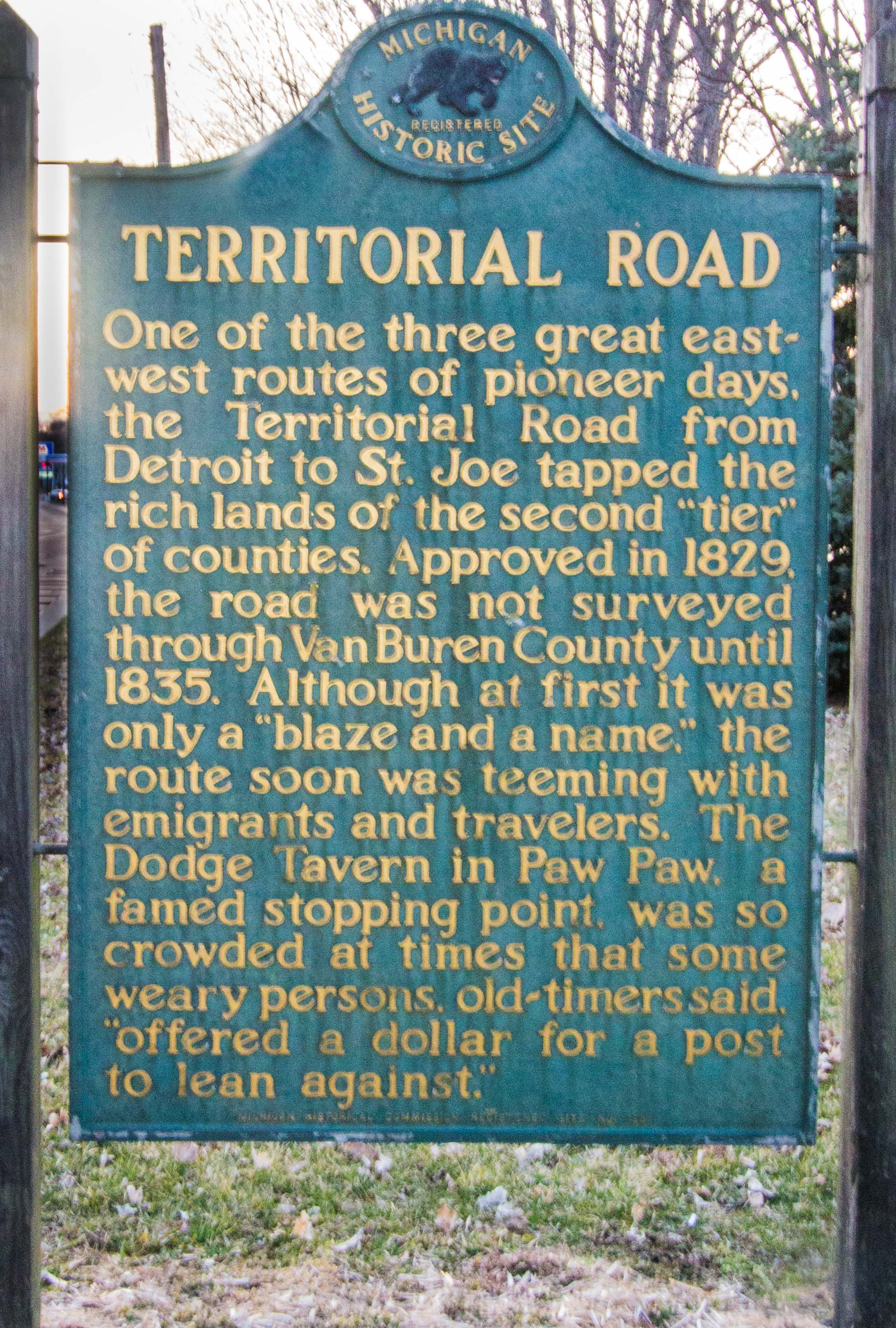
Territorial Road designation information, Paw Paw, Michigan 42°13.079′N 85°53.679′W

Territorial Road was the first main road through Michigan, from Detroit to Chicago. In the 19th century, it led people from the Eastern United States through Michigan Territory. It was also called the Chicago Road.

== Route ==
Starting at Michigan Avenue (modern-day US Highway 12) in downtown Detroit, it generally parallels the present-day Interstate 94. The 200-mile (320 km) route runs from Detroit to Ann Arbor, Albion, Marshall, Battle Creek, Paw Paw, and Benton Harbor. In some areas, it is still known as Territorial Road, like Calhoun County.

== Background ==
External image
- Native American trails in Michigan

Generally, Michigan's main highways followed trails used by Native Americans for centuries to travel between their villages and hunting and fishing grounds. Native Americans are believed to have lived in Michigan since 11,000 BC. The trails were narrow paths, about 12 to 18 inches (300 to 460 mm) wide, located on high, dry ground along streams and watersheds. Native Americans used dog sleds to move their cargo, a tradition that was followed in Michigan's territorial days, when dogs pulled sleds with mail and cargo on the trails.

The trails were used by fur traders, explorers, and missionaries to travel into the frontier. The roads were improved and widened for pack horses and settlers. Initially, branches and bushes were cleared, making the trails two to three feet wide to allow room for pack horses. Then, the trails were further widened for oxen-drawn wagons. Federal funds were appropriated to improve the roads, which involved cutting down trees and filling in swampy and low areas. Traveling by wagon was slow, particularly after the roads developed ruts. Later improvements were gravel and then paved roads.

== History ==
The St. Joseph Indian Trail connected with the Great Trail, from Chesapeake Bay on the Atlantic Seaboard to the Mississippi River and the Plains States to the west. The Great Trail connected with Michigan trails from Toledo to Detroit, and up to Lake Huron. Michigan Territory's legislative council voted to survey land for a route from the east to the west side of the territory in 1829, following the St. Joseph Indian Trail. The road began at Sheldon Inn at the corner of what is now Michigan Avenue and Geddes Road (named for Washtenaw County settlers Robert and John Geddes) and ended at its westernmost point at the mouth of the St. Joseph River at Lake Michigan. It was initially called the St. Joseph Road.

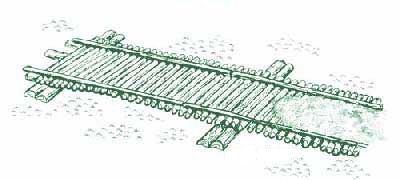
Corduroy road

Construction of the road began in 1830, when settlers of eastern Michigan began to use the road. The survey was completed by 1831. Father Gabriel Richard, a delegate to the United States Congress from 1823 to 1825, helped garner support for the road that would facilitate settlement in the state and provide a means for travel between Chicago and Detroit. The federal government provided $20,000 (equivalent to $669,000 in 2024) to upgrade and complete the road, to accommodate the weight of wagons. It was built of logs in a corduroy pattern. It was declared a public highway on May 3, 1831, and soon after began to be called Territorial Road. On May 30, 1834, the road was first used by a stagecoach line. In 1836, it would take three days to travel 80 miles (130 km) from Detroit to Jackson. Inns and taverns were built along the road, and the road helped form communities along its path. Michigan Territory's population grew 250% from 1830 to 1840.

Territorial Road was used by General William Henry Harrison and his troops during the War of 1812 to travel between Indiana and Detroit to attack the British in the Siege of Detroit. During World War I, it was designated a military route called the Red Arrow Highway.

== Historical markers ==
Historical markers were located east to west at:

- Geddes Road, east of the intersection with Michigan Avenue in Canton
- Sheldon's Corner, including Sheldon Inn, on Michigan Avenue southeast of the intersection of Geddes Road and Michigan Avenue in Canton
- Old Territorial Road historical plaque at Albion, Michigan, installed by the Daughters of the American Revolution (DAR)
- In Jonesville, Michigan, commemorating Father Gabriel Richard for his negotiation of federal funds for the Sauk Trail, part of the Territorial Road
- Territorial Road and the Dodge Tavern, Old US 12, Paw Paw
- In Keeler, also installed by the local DAR
