= Johanne Trudel =

Canadian Federal Court of Appeal

Personal details
- Born: November 4, 1953 (age 72)

Johanne Trudel (born November 4, 1953) is a judge currently serving on the Canadian Federal Court of Appeal.
