= St. Joseph's Episcopal Church =

St. Joseph's Episcopal Church may refer to:

in the United States

(by state)

- Saint Joseph's Episcopal Church, 1883 (Detroit, Michigan), listed on the NRHP in Michigan
- Saint Joseph's Episcopal Church, 1926 (Detroit, Michigan), listed on the NRHP in Michigan
- St. Joseph's Episcopal Church (Durham, North Carolina)
- St. Joseph's African Methodist Episcopal Church, Durham, North Carolina, listed on the NRHP in Durham County, North Carolina
- St. Joseph's Episcopal Church (Fayetteville, North Carolina), listed on the NRHP in Cumberland County, North Carolina
