= Grace Evangelical Lutheran Church =

Grace Evangelical Lutheran Church may refer to:

Sites on the National Park Service National Register of Historic Places:

- Grace Evangelical Lutheran Church (Highland Park, Michigan)
- Grace Evangelical Lutheran Church (Minneapolis, Minnesota)
