= Pleasant Ridge Historic District =

- U.S. National Register of Historic Places
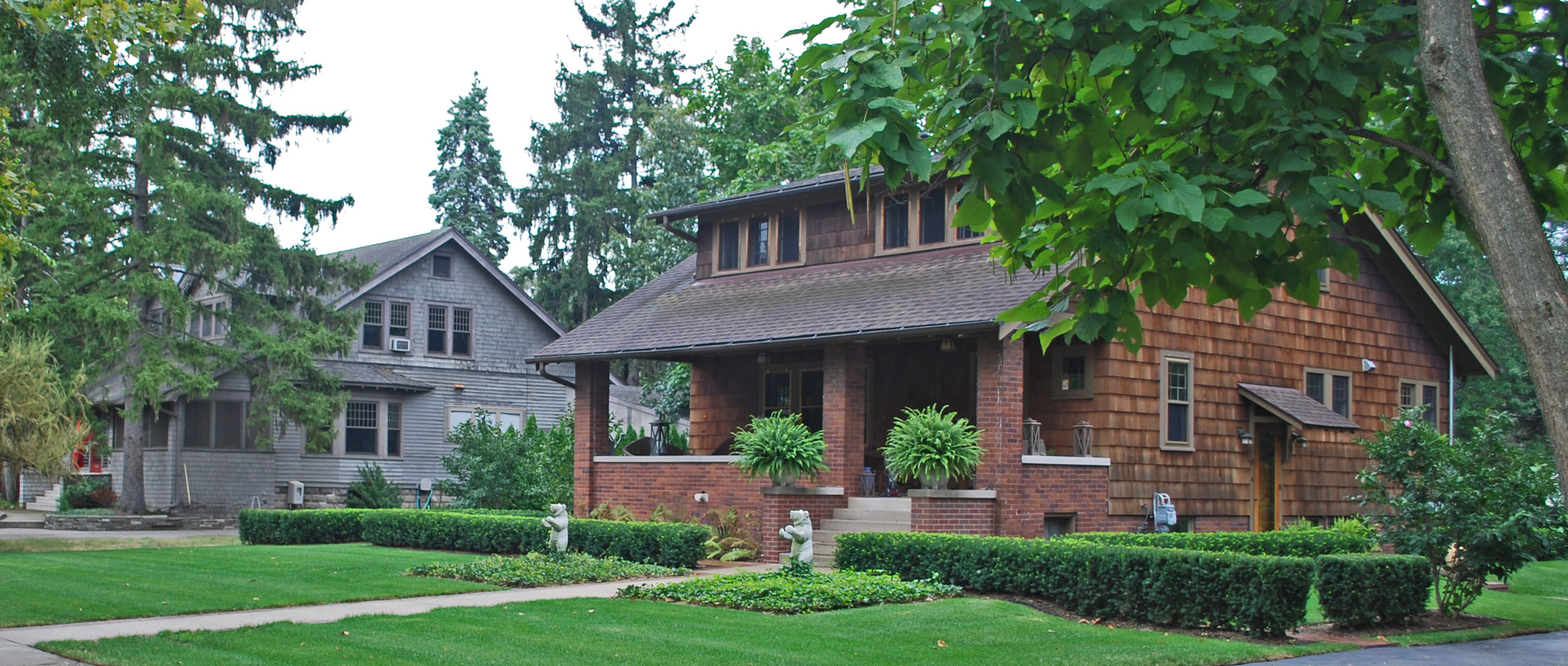

- Location within Michigan Location within the United States
- Interactive map
- Location: Roughly bounded by Millington Rd., Woodward Ave., and the city limits of Royal Oak, Huntington Woods, Oak Park, and Ferndale, Pleasant Ridge, Michigan
- Coordinates: 42°28′14″N 83°8′43″W
- Area: 85 acres (34 ha)
- Architect: Albert Kahn, Et al.
- Architectural style: Colonial Revival, Bungalow/craftsman, Tudor Revival, Late 19th And Early 20th Century American Movements
- NRHP reference No.: 92000165 (original); 10001024 (increase)

Significant dates
- Added to NRHP: August 11, 1992
- Boundary increase: December 13, 2010

The Pleasant Ridge Historic District is a primarily residential historic district located in Pleasant Ridge, Michigan. The original portion of the district was listed on the National Register of Historic Places in 1992, and encompassed an area west of Woodward Avenue to Ridge Road, and running from Millington Road to the city limits of Ferndale. The boundaries of the district were increased in 2010, to include the area west of Ridge Road to the city limits of Royal Oak, Huntington Woods, Oak Park, and Ferndale.

== History ==
The area in this district of Pleasant Ridge was originally a farm belonging to Virgil Rose, who ran a tavern on Woodward Avenue from the 1840s until 1880. However, Virgil lost this portion of his holdings in 1885, and by 1894 attorney Alfred F. Wilcox had purchased the land. Wilcox constructed his own house on Woodward (now demolished), and in 1906 began platting the farm into residential lots. The first of these were along what is now Ridge Road. Further subdivisions were platted in the 1910s and 1920s. Many of the land sales and house construction were completed by a few developers, chiefly the Walter Gehrke Company, which was responsible for the quite and residential character of the neighborhood.

Early residents were well-off, but not necessarily wealthy, professionals, such as doctors, attorneys, professors, executives in public corporations. Notable residents included Fred H. Johnson, President of Progressive Welder Co; Rev. Edgar Dewitt Jones, pastor of the Central Woodward Christian Church in Detroit; Dr. Edward J. Martin, Head of Physics and Instrumentation at General Motors; Dr. Ben Goodrich, physician in charge of Pulmonary disease at Henry Ford Hospital in Detroit; Dr. Myra Babcock, Head of Anesthesiology at Grace Hospital in Detroit; Ernest Fletcher, Mayor of Pleasant Ridge; and Louis H. Fead, former Chief Justice of the Michigan Supreme Court.

== Description ==
The Pleasant Ridge Historic District is almost entirely residential, and is made up of residences primarily constructed between 1910 and 1930. These houses include various architectural styles, but are substantially historical revivals such as Colonial, English Tudor, Dutch Colonial, English Cottage, French Eclectic and Spanish Colonial. There are also examples of the Arts and Crafts style, including Craftsman and Prairie School types. The original section of the district contains 181 structures, of which 151 contribute to the historical character of the neighborhood. The 2010 addition contains an additional 340 structures, of which 326 contribute to the historical character of the neighborhood.

== Gallery ==
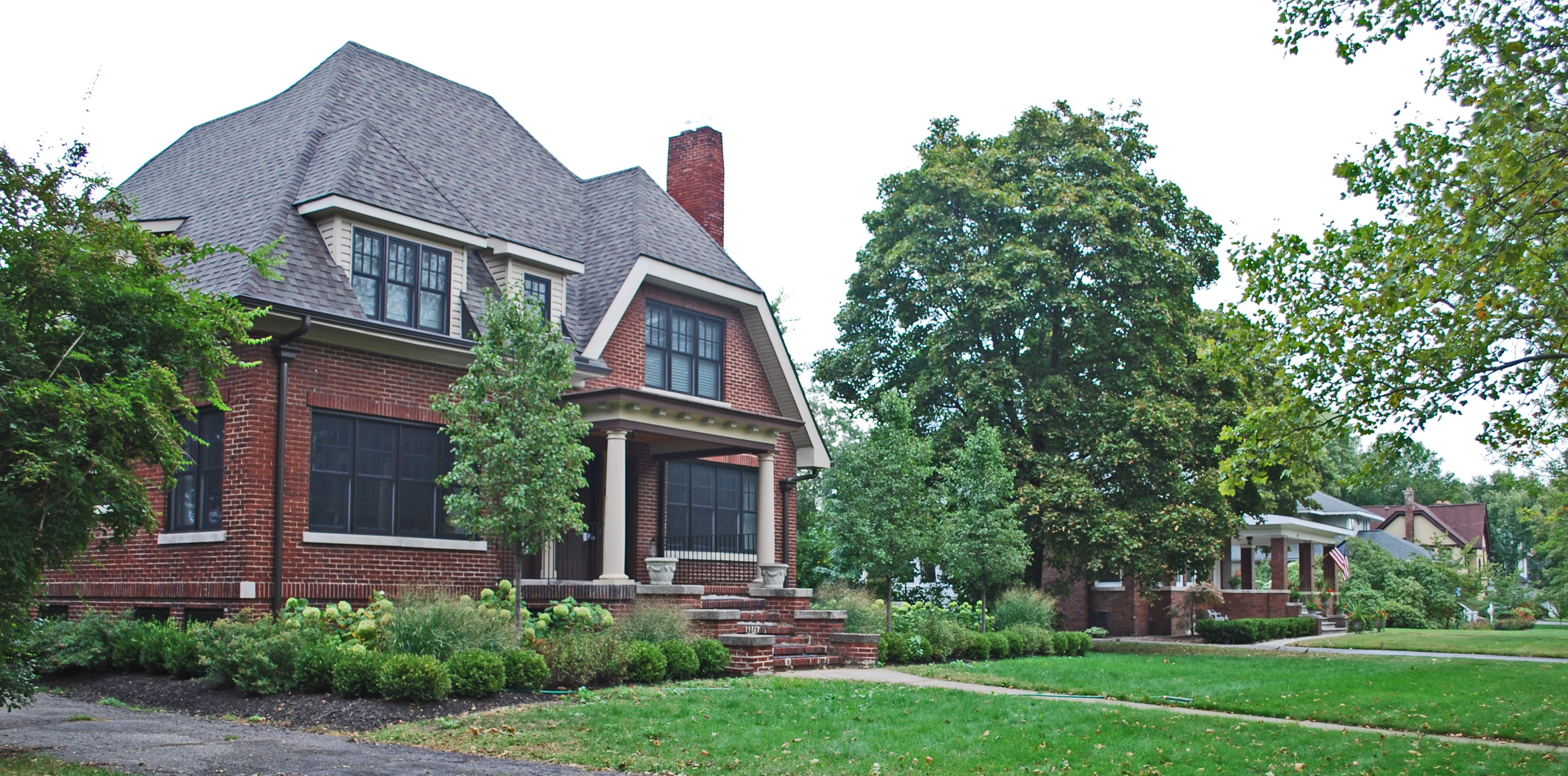

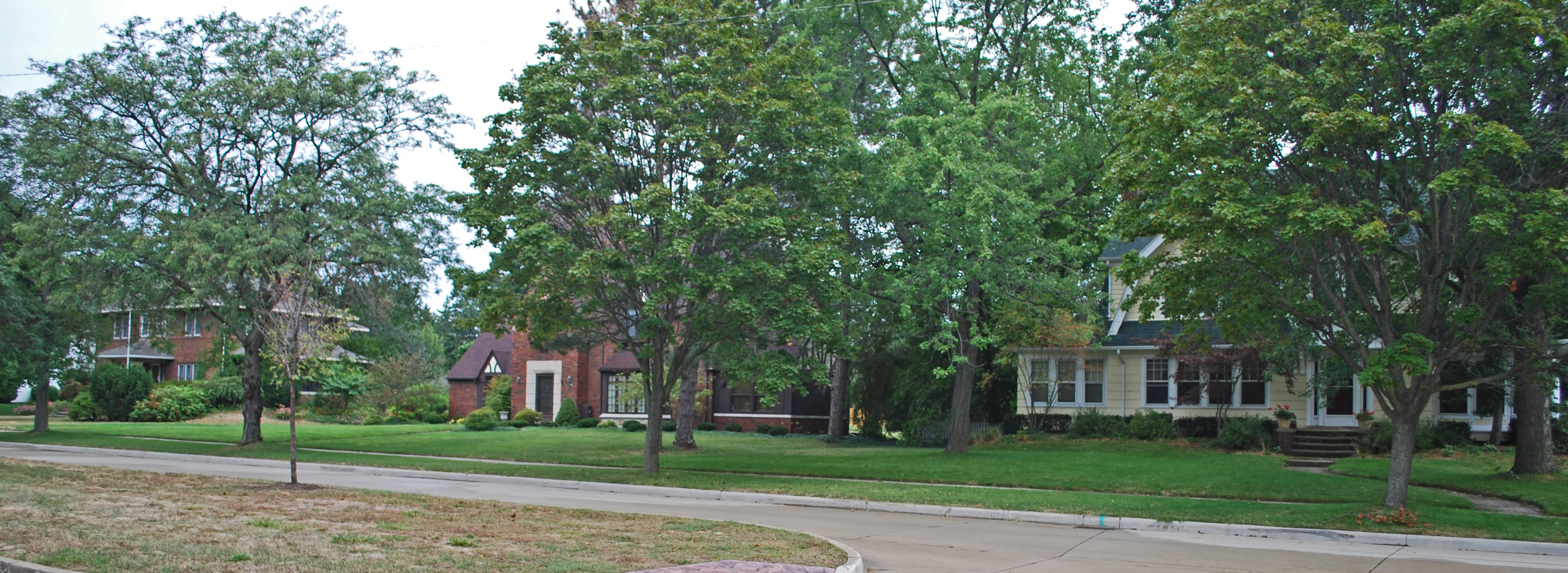

== See also ==
- National Register of Historic Places listings in Oakland County, Michigan
