= First Baptist Church (Detroit) =

Historic church in Michigan, United States

- First Baptist Church of Detroit
- U.S. National Register of Historic Places
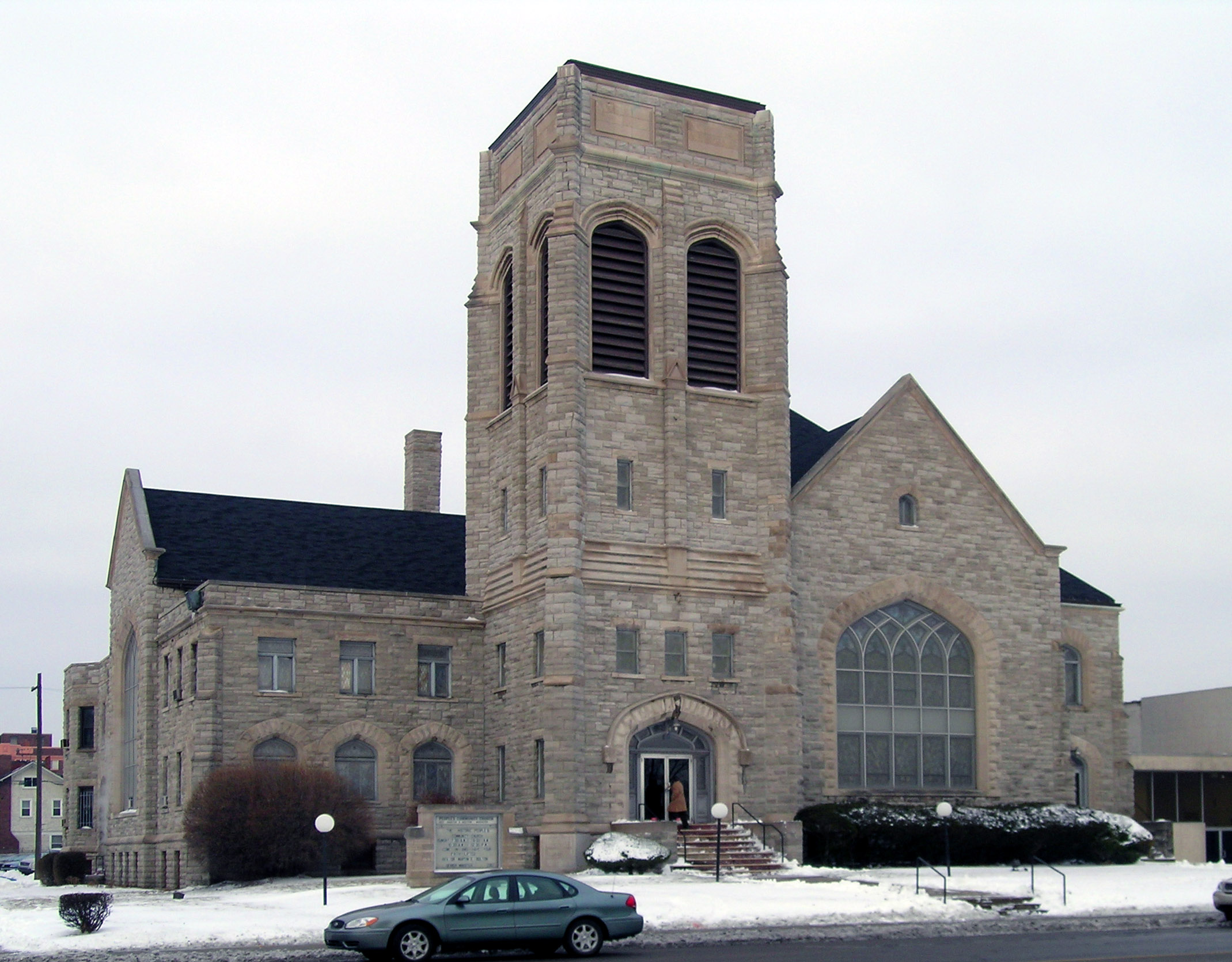
- Church facade from Woodward
- Interactive map
- Location: 8601 Woodward Avenue; Detroit, Michigan
- Coordinates: 42°22′43.74″N 83°4′46.98″W
- Built: 1909
- Architect: John H. Coxhead
- Architectural style: Late Gothic Revival
- MPS: Religious Structures of Woodward Avenue TR
- NRHP reference No.: 82002898
- Added to NRHP: August 3, 1982

The former First Baptist Church is a historic Baptist church building located at 8601 Woodward Avenue in Detroit, Michigan. Built in 1909, it was designed by architect Guy J. Vinton in the Late Gothic Revival style. It is now the Peoples Community Church. The building was added to the National Register of Historic Places on August 3, 1982.

== History ==
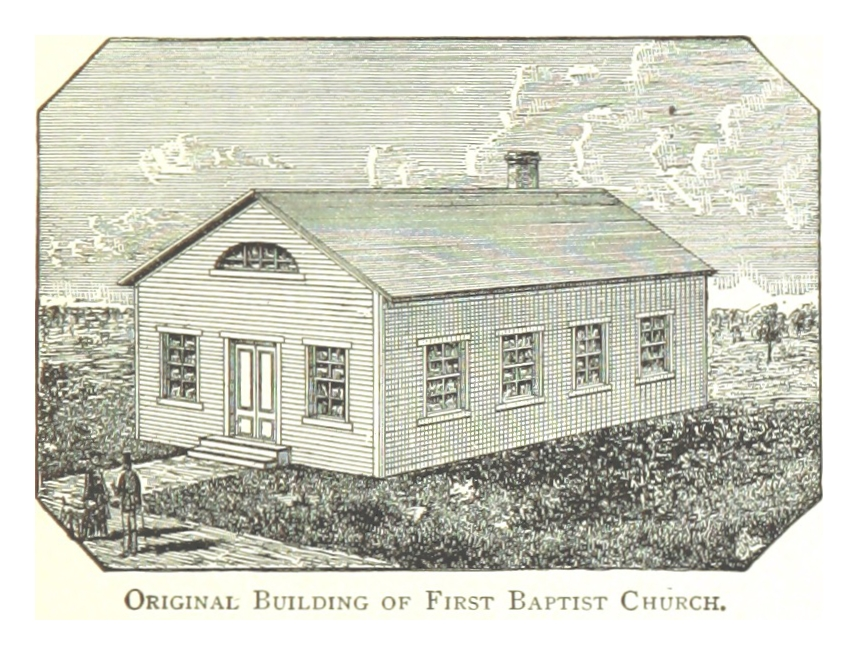
Original frame building at Fort and Griswold

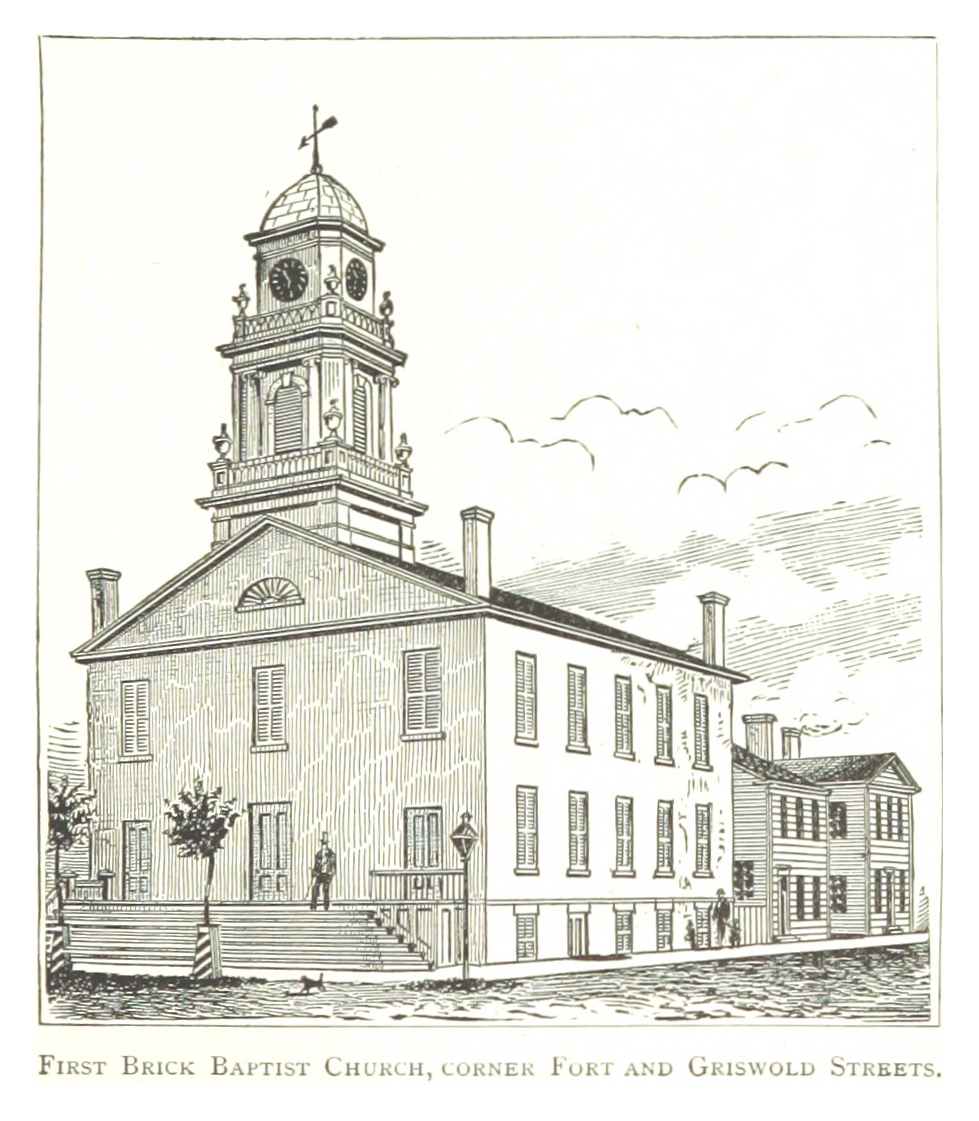
1835 brick building

The First Baptist Church of Detroit was founded on October 20, 1827. The first church constructed by the congregation, a small frame structure, was built at the corner of Fort and Griswold Streets in 1831. The frame structure was replaced with a spacious brick church in 1835. The congregation built larger structures in 1859-63 and 1871–75.

As members of the congregation moved outwards from downtown Detroit, the church followed, and in 1909 the church hired Guy J. Vinton to design and construct this church on Woodward. However, after World War II, membership decreased, and in 1957 the congregation sold the building to the Peoples Community Church. The First Baptist congregation moved on to Southfield and constructed a new church in 1965.

== Description ==
The former First Baptist Church of Detroit is a rockfaced, limestone, Gothic-style church measuring 120 feet long by 110 feet wide. The front facade has a massive, Gothic-arched traceried window balanced with a large square flat-roofed corner tower containing the entryway. An educational wing is adjacent to the tower of similar design to the main church. The exterior of the church is notable for its lack of ornamentation, relying on its massive proportions for visual impact.

The interior of the church conforms to the Akron plan, with a large, square, barrel-vaulted central auditorium containing wooden pews arranged in a semi-circle. Notably, a broad, curving balcony panelled with a Gothic arch motif completely encompasses the auditorium. The portion of the balcony over the sanctuary contains the choir loft and organ pipes. The transepts on both the main floor and balcony level are constructed to be used as either classrooms or, by opening partitions, overflow seating space.
