= Pleasant Ridge East Historic District =

- U.S. National Register of Historic Places
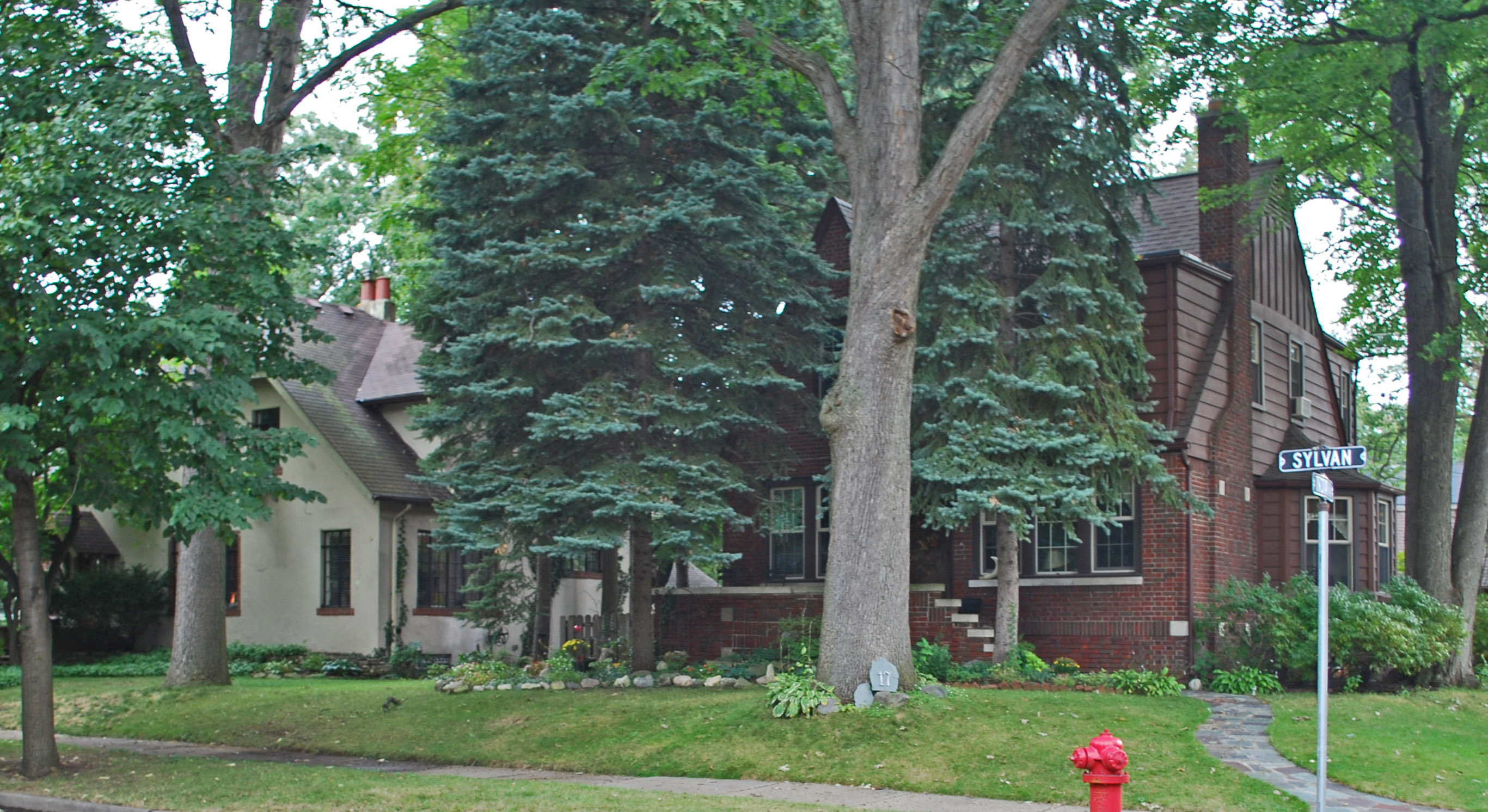
- Interactive map
- Location: Bounded generally by Woodward, 10 Mile Rd., Conrail and east city limits and south city limits, Pleasant Ridge, Michigan
- Coordinates: 42°28′14″N 83°8′13″W
- Area: 90 acres (36 ha)
- Architectural style: Bungalow/craftsman, Colonial Revival, et al.
- NRHP reference No.: 06001329
- Added to NRHP: February 1, 2007

The Pleasant Ridge East Historic District is a residential historic district located east of Woodward Avenue in Pleasant Ridge, Michigan, and bounded by Woodward, Ten Mile Road, Conrail, and the east and south city limits. The district was listed on the National Register of Historic Places in 2007.

== History ==
The first settler in what is now Pleasant Ridge was Virgil Rose, who purchased a 400-acre portion of land centered on the Ten Mile Road - Woodward Avenue intersection. In the late 19th century, the Rose family heirs sold a portion of the tract west of Woodward to Alfred F. Wilcox, who developed a large estate in 1900 and in 1906 began platting a subdivision. The Rose family continued to own the land east of Woodward until 1914, when they platted the LaBelle Heights and Hamilton Woods subdivisions which include the majority of this historic district. The first houses were built in 1915-16, and in 1919 Pleasant Ridge, on both east and west sides of Woodward, was incorporated as a village.

Development boomed in the 1920s, and a number of developers and building contractors worked in the area. The most prominent of these was Walter Gehrke, who established an office in the district in 1926. The village incorporated as a city in 1927. The Pleasant Ridge East Historic District became home to a range of business, professional, and middle class workers, including teachers, architects, art directors, auditors, editors, brokers, accountants, brokers, metallurgists, electrical engineers, chemists, dentists, pharmacists, and physicians.

== Description ==
The Pleasant Ridge East Historic District is a primarily single-family home residential district, with only a few commercial properties along Woodward and Main Street. The neighborhoods are remarkably intact and cohesive, with homes representing a variety of architectural styles popular during the 1920s and 1930s, including colonials, English cottages, bungalows and Craftsman structures. The district's largest homes tend to be located along the block or two closest to Woodward, with the ones most modest in scale farther away, near the railroad line.

== Gallery ==
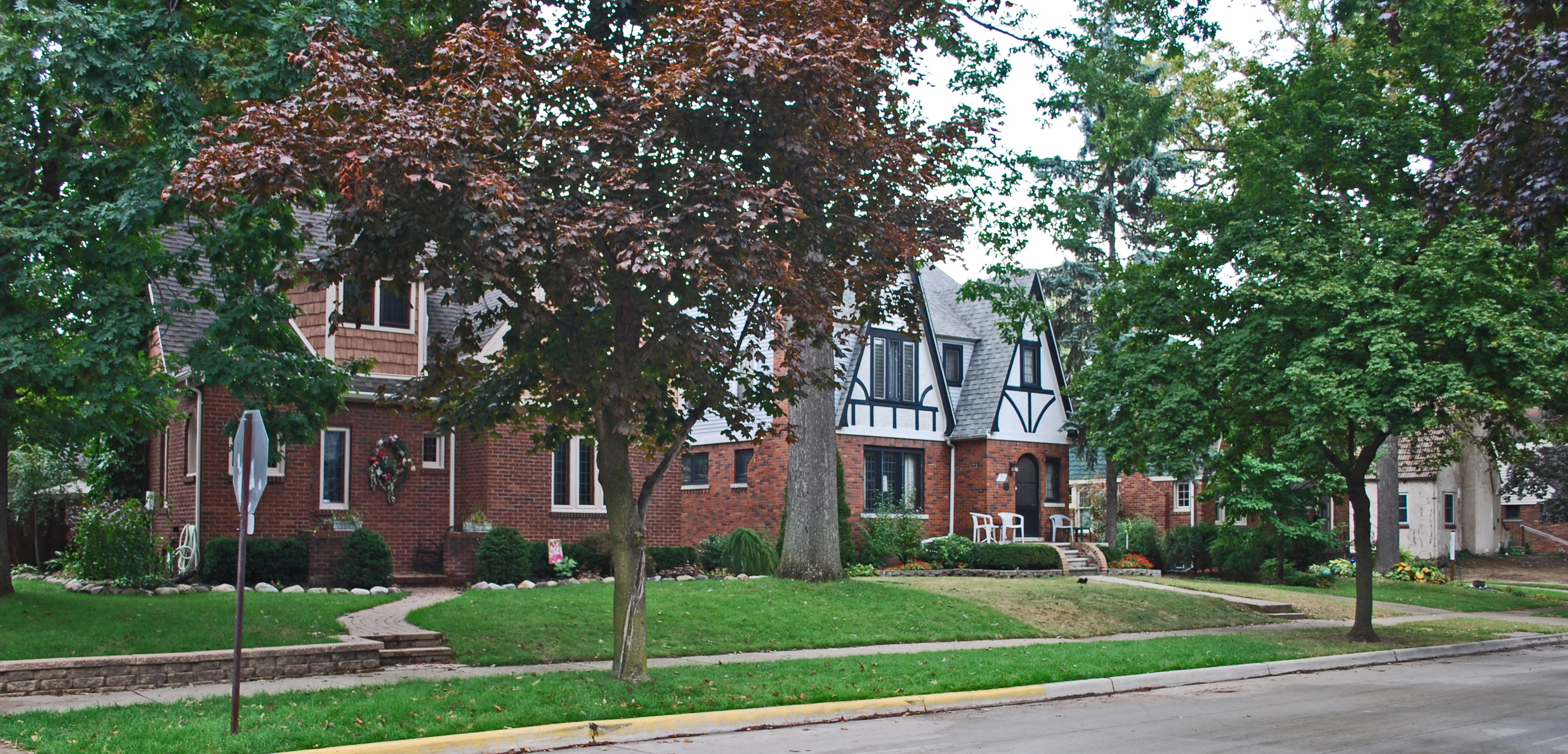

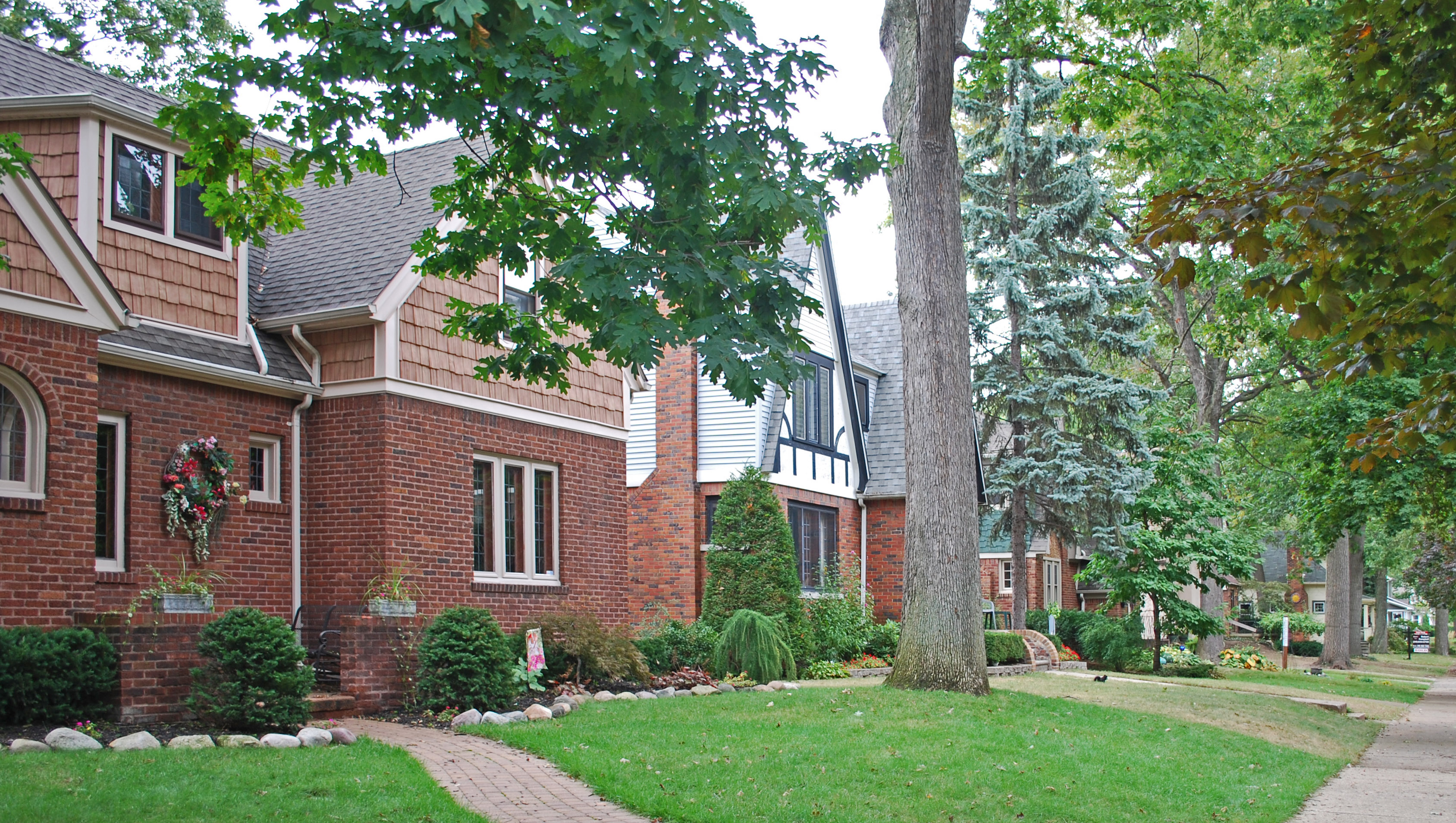

== See also ==
- National Register of Historic Places listings in Oakland County, Michigan
