= Pleasant Ridge, Michigan =

Pleasant Ridge
- City
- City of Pleasant Ridge
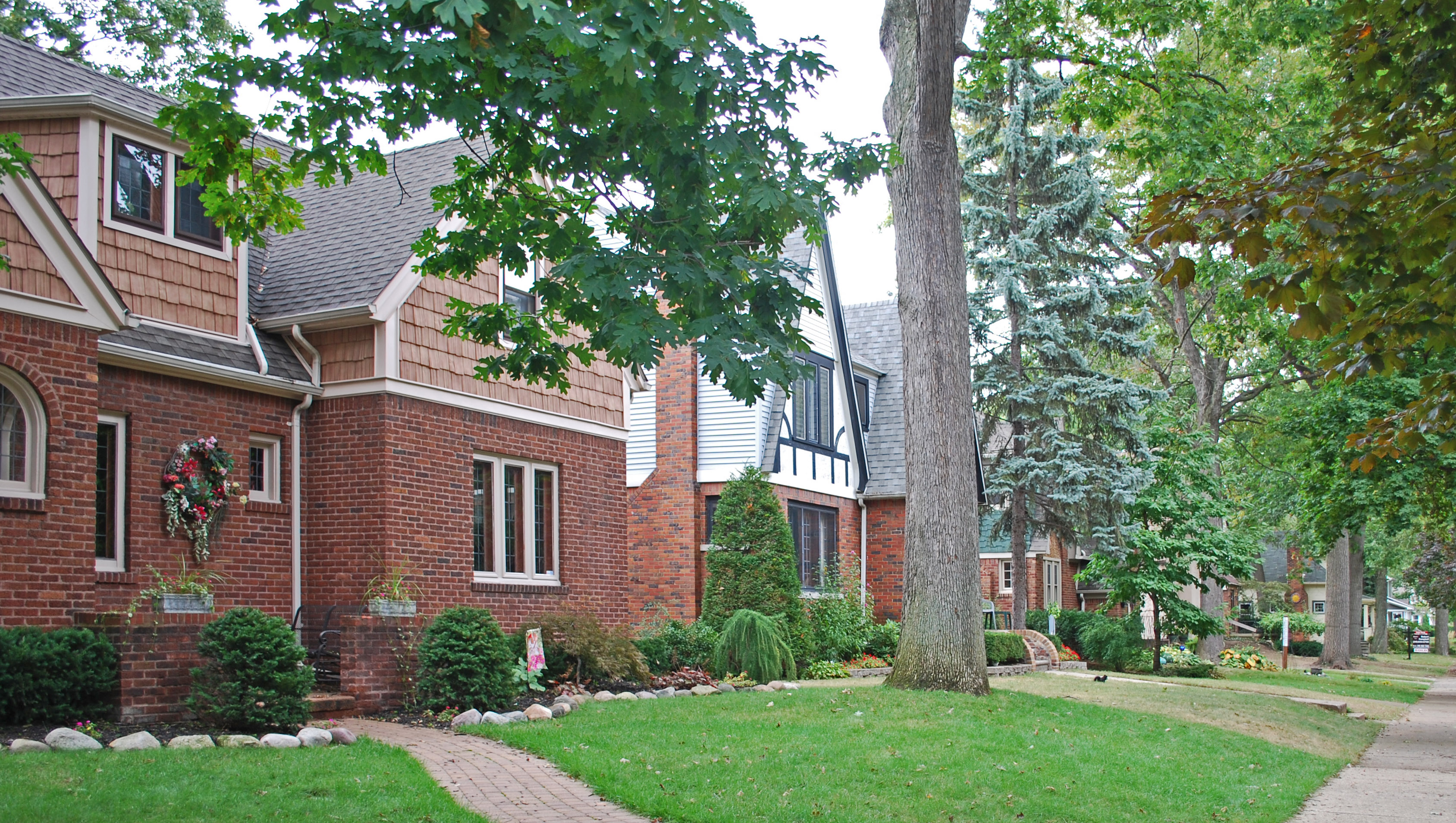
- Pleasant Ridge East Historic District

- Flag Seal

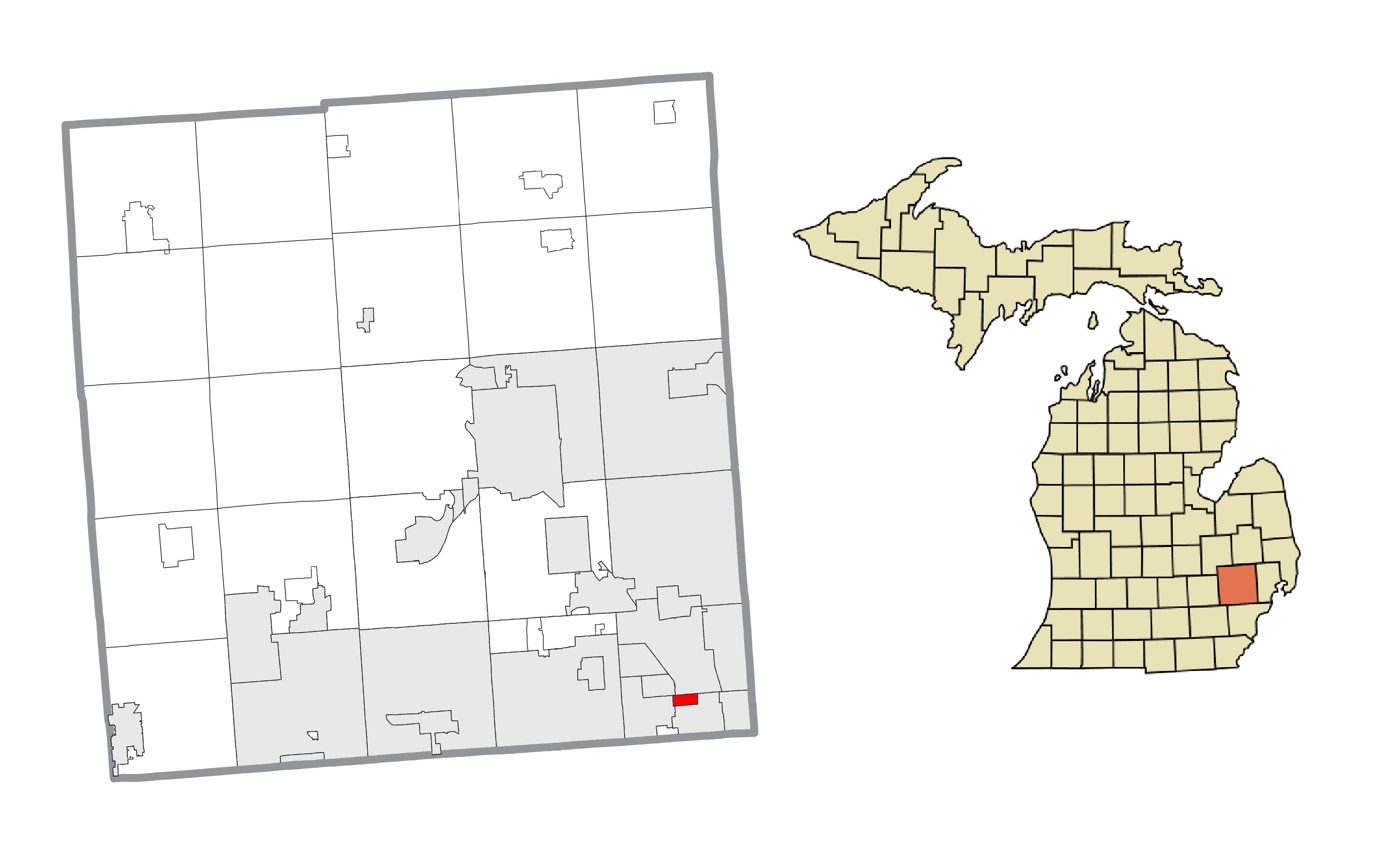
- Location within Oakland County

- Location within the state of Michigan Location within the United States
- Coordinates: 42°28′16″N 83°08′32″W
- Country: United States
- State: Michigan
- County: Oakland
- Founded: 1913
- Incorporated: 1921 (village); 1927 (city)

Government
  - Type: City commission
  - Mayor: Bret Scott
  - Clerk: Kersten Emsley

Area
  - City: 0.57 sq mi (1.48 km^{2})
  - Land: 0.57 sq mi (1.48 km^{2})
  - Water: 0 sq mi (0.00 km^{2})
- Elevation: 640 ft (195 m)

Population (2020)
  - City: 2,627
  - Density: 4,608.77/sq mi (1,779.46/km^{2})
  - Metro: 4,392,041 (Metro Detroit)
- Time zone: UTC−5 (EST)
  - Summer (DST): UTC−4 (EDT)
- ZIP Code: 48069
- Area code: 248
- FIPS code: 26-64900
- GNIS feature ID: 635117
- Website: Official website

Pleasant Ridge is a city in Oakland County in the U.S. state of Michigan. An inner-ring suburb of Detroit on the Woodward Corridor, Pleasant Ridge is located roughly 11 miles (17.7 km) northwest of downtown Detroit. As of the 2020 census, the city had a population of 2,627.

With a land area of 0.57 square miles (1.48 km^{2}), Pleasant Ridge is the fifth-smallest city by land area in the state of Michigan after the cities of Sylvan Lake, Keego Harbor, Petersburg, and Clarkston.

== History ==
Pleasant Ridge began when Burt Taylor subdivided the Mayday farm in 1913. The community incorporated as a village within Royal Oak Township in 1921 and again as an autonomous city in 1927. The origin of the name is believed to derive from the main thoroughfare of Ridge Road.

One of the more notable establishments within the city was Hedge's Wigwam, which was a Native American-themed restaurant that operated from 1927 until 1967.

Pleasant Ridge was actively involved in resisting the construction of the middle segment of Interstate 696 in the early 1960s.

=== Historic districts ===
- Pleasant Ridge East Historic District
- Pleasant Ridge Historic District

=== Same-sex households ===
Pleasant Ridge is bordered on the south by the city of Ferndale, which is considered the center of the LGBT community in the Metro Detroit region. The city of Pleasant Ridge is among the top cities in the nation with same-sex couple households, with at least 60 per 1,000 according to figures from the United States Census Bureau. A study by the Williams Institute from the University of California, Los Angeles recorded 59.55 same-sex couples for every 1,000 households in the city of Pleasant Ridge, while the state as a whole ranked low with only 5.6 for every 1,000 households. However, the study did not record the number of homosexual residents, only the number of same-sex households. The study listed Pleasant Ridge as having the highest same-sex household ratio in the state, ahead of Ferndale with 35.0 same-sex couples for every 1,000 households.

These numbers rank Pleasant Ridge as having the seventh-highest same-sex household ratio in the nation. Cities in the nation with a higher ratio include Provincetown, Massachusetts; Wilton Manors, Florida; Palm Springs, California; Rehoboth Beach, Delaware; Guerneville, California; and West Hollywood, California.

== Geography ==
According to the U.S. Census Bureau, the city has a total area of 0.57 square miles (1.48 km^{2}), all land.

Pleasant Ridge is adjacent to the cities of Oak Park to the west, Huntington Woods to the northwest, Royal Oak to the northeast, and Ferndale to the south and east. The portion of the city located west of Woodward Avenue (M-1) includes the Pleasant Ridge Historic District and its spacious residential homes, while an area of more modest homes is located east of Woodward.

=== Major highways ===
- I-696 (Walter P. Reuther Freeway) forms the entire northern border of the city. The Detroit Zoo is located on the opposite side of the highway in the cities of Huntington Woods and Royal Oak.
- M-1 (Woodward Avenue) is part of the Woodward Corridor that runs south–north through the center of the city.

== Demographics ==
Historical population
Census	Pop.	Note	%±
1920	472		—
1930	2,885		511.2%
1940	3,391		17.5%
1950	3,594		6.0%
1960	3,807		5.9%
1970	3,989		4.8%
1980	3,217		−19.4%
1990	2,775		−13.7%
2000	2,594		−6.5%
2010	2,526		−2.6%
2020	2,627		4.0%
U.S. Decennial Census

=== 2020 census ===
As of the 2020 census, Pleasant Ridge had a population of 2,627. The median age was 45.0 years. 19.9% of residents were under the age of 18 and 18.1% of residents were 65 years of age or older. For every 100 females there were 103.3 males, and for every 100 females age 18 and over there were 102.6 males age 18 and over.

100.0% of residents lived in urban areas, while 0.0% lived in rural areas.

There were 1,111 households in Pleasant Ridge, of which 28.9% had children under the age of 18 living in them. Of all households, 58.2% were married-couple households, 14.7% were households with a male householder and no spouse or partner present, and 20.2% were households with a female householder and no spouse or partner present. About 26.2% of all households were made up of individuals and 10.2% had someone living alone who was 65 years of age or older.

There were 1,152 housing units, of which 3.6% were vacant. The homeowner vacancy rate was 1.0% and the rental vacancy rate was 3.3%.

Racial composition as of the 2020 census
Race	Number	Percent
White	2,360	89.8%
Black or African American	42	1.6%
American Indian and Alaska Native	1	0.0%
Asian	32	1.2%
Native Hawaiian and Other Pacific Islander	0	0.0%
Some other race	16	0.6%
Two or more races	176	6.7%
Hispanic or Latino (of any race)	77	2.9%

=== 2010 census ===
As of the census of 2010, there were 2,526 people, 1,115 households, and 674 families living in the city. The population density was 4,431.6 inhabitants per square mile (1,711.1/km^{2}). There were 1,153 housing units at an average density of 2,022.8 per square mile (781.0/km^{2}). The racial makeup of the city was 94.7% White, 1.9% African American, 0.1% Native American, 1.1% Asian, 0.3% from other races, and 1.9% from two or more races. Hispanic or Latino of any race were 1.7% of the population.

There were 1,115 households, of which 26.6% had children under the age of 18 living with them, 52.7% were married couples living together, 5.7% had a female householder with no husband present, 2.0% had a male householder with no wife present, and 39.6% were non-families. 28.4% of all households were made up of individuals, and 9.5% had someone living alone who was 65 years of age or older. The average household size was 2.27 and the average family size was 2.87.

The median age in the city was 43.4 years. 20.3% of residents were under the age of 18; 3.5% were between the ages of 18 and 24; 29.4% were from 25 to 44; 32.6% were from 45 to 64; and 14.4% were 65 years of age or older. The gender makeup of the city was 50.8% male and 49.2% female.

=== 2000 census ===
As of the census of 2000, there were 2,594 people, 1,110 households, and 712 families living in the city. The population density was 4,563.7 inhabitants per square mile (1,762.1/km^{2}). There were 1,129 housing units at an average density of 1,986.3 per square mile (766.9/km^{2}). The racial makeup of the city was 96.57% White, 0.85% African American, 0.42% Native American, 0.89% Asian, 0.04% Pacific Islander, 0.39% from other races, and 0.85% from two or more races. Hispanic or Latino of any race were 1.77% of the population.

There were 1,110 households, out of which 29.1% had children under the age of 18 living with them, 55.5% were married couples living together, 7.0% had a female householder with no husband present, and 35.8% were non-families. 26.1% of all households were made up of individuals, and 8.4% had someone living alone who was 65 years of age or older. The average household size was 2.33 and the average family size was 2.87.

In the city, the population was spread out, with 22.0% under the age of 18, 3.9% from 18 to 24, 33.4% from 25 to 44, 29.3% from 45 to 64, and 11.4% who were 65 years of age or older. The median age was 40 years. For every 100 females, there were 99.8 males. For every 100 females age 18 and over, there were 97.1 males.

The median income for a household in the city was $80,682, and the median income for a family was $92,134. Males had a median income of $66,071 versus $44,231 for females. The per capita income for the city was $40,846. About 1.2% of families and 2.0% of the population were below the poverty line, including 2.3% of those under age 18 and 2.0% of those age 65 or over.

== Education ==
The entire city is served by Ferndale Public Schools, which is headquartered to the south in the city of Ferndale.
