= Hedge's Wigwam =

Coordinates: 42°28′31″N 83°08′43″W

Hedge's Wigwam was a Native American-themed restaurant in Pleasant Ridge, Michigan, operating from 1927 until 1967. It was located at 24362 Woodward Avenue, one block from the original Saginaw Trail.

== History ==
Roy Hedge opened an orange juice stand at Ten Mile and Main Street in 1920. As the business grew, Hedge added food to the menu including barbecued beef sandwiches and chicken pot pies. After a visit to Mackinaw City where he saw a Native American-themed restaurant, Hedge decided to create a similar-styled restaurant, and Hedge's Wigwam opened in 1927.

The exterior of the building featured a giant concrete teepee over the front door, a fort-like log-sided exterior, and five painted concrete Native American statues out front. Each Native American stood with his arms folded and a blanket over his back. They weighed 1,800 pounds (820 kg) each. It appears that the statues were cast from just two different molds. Their positions in front of the restaurant changed over the years as the front of the building was remodeled. The five concrete statues that stood guard in front of the building used to be painted every year in the spring. In the later years they began to be neglected and started to chip away. There is evidence from several postcards that one or two additional statues stood on the roof. It is unknown if they were also made of concrete.

The restaurant was described as "a unique air-conditioned cafeteria serving excellent food in an unusual and pleasing atmosphere." The exotic interior had birchbark columns and picture frames; moss-covered walls; redwood tables with shadowbox tops containing Native American artifacts; cedar chairs; parchment lighting; Native American paintings, ceramic table settings with Hedge's teepee logo; a stone staircase, and a waterfall with a wishing-well, fish pond. Several moose heads were mounted on the walls. It also had a gift shop.

The cafeteria-style buffet was unique in the area. Once inside the restaurant, patrons were led to their table by a host dressed as a Native American maiden.

Hedge's Wigwam became a big area attraction. For four decades, it was the place for cruisers to stop for a good meal on their drive up Woodward. According to the Roger Schmidt article, "Hedge died in 1955 and left the business to his longtime employees. At the time of his death, the restaurant was serving close to 2,000 meals a day."

According to a postcard of Hedge's Wigwam, it was open from 11 A.M. to 2. A.M. daily, all year round. It was located at Woodward Avenue at 10 Mile Rd., and operated in connection with Hedge's Wigwam, "a delightful table service dining room on Woodward Ave. at 12 Mile Rd., Royal Oak, Mich. Both restaurants are only a short drive from the city of Detroit, and are near the Shrine of the Little Flower (National Shrine of the Little Flower) and the Detroit Zoological Park (Detroit Zoo)." A matchbook from Hedge's Wigwam also lists both addresses.

Interstate 696 was being planned in the 1960s, which was to be routed through the area of the restaurant. Despite delays in the construction of the freeway, planned improvements to the restaurant were canceled and it was closed in 1967. Several items from the restaurant, including the Native American statues, were auctioned off in January 1968.

== Historic location ==
The original Hedge's Wigwam was built at the intersection of Woodward Avenue, Main Street, and Ten Mile Road (now Interstate 696). This is one block from the Ridge Road portion of the original Saginaw Trail which traveled from Detroit to Saginaw, Michigan. This was also the original site of Rose's Tavern, the home and business of the first pioneer of European descent to settle in what would become Pleasant Ridge, Michigan. Virgil Maxim Rose came from Pennsylvania to Detroit but when a cholera epidemic broke out in 1832, he moved his family to this location. They started a farm and built their house which served as an inn and tavern facing south on this triangular piece of land. The inn had several names including Traveler's Home, Traveler's Rest, and Rose's Tavern. It was visited often by traveler's from Detroit as that was about a one-day journey. The tavern burned to the ground around 1880.

== Artifacts ==
Several artifacts from the original Hedge's Wigwam have survived. A cedar chair is on display at the Ferndale Historical Museum. A coat rack and some ceramic items are at the Pleasant Ridge Historical Museum.

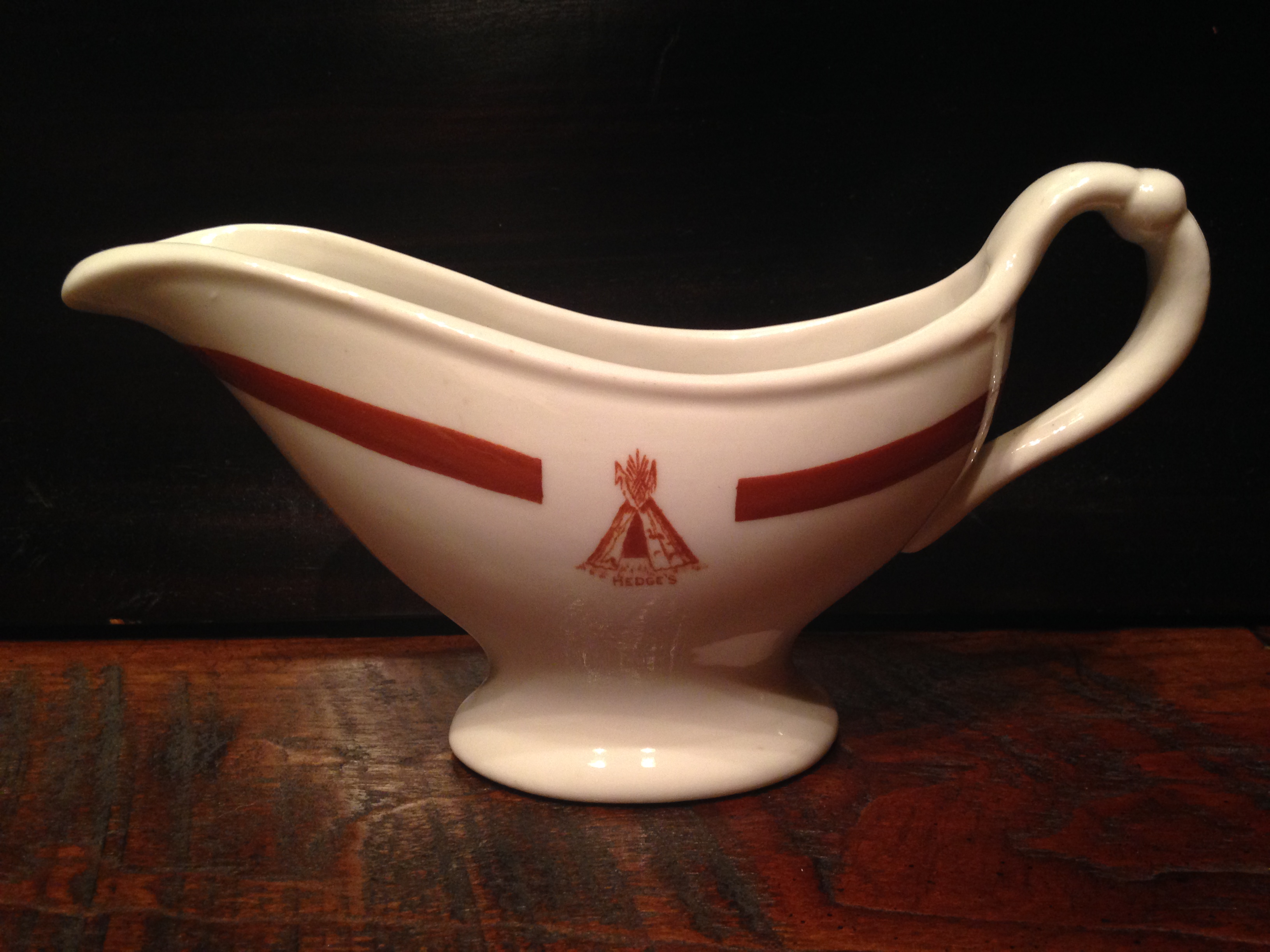
Hedge's Wigwam Tableware

Of the seven statues, one named "Chief Pontiac" has been on display at the Paint Creek Cider Mill in Oakland Township, Michigan for decades and still remains there in 2015. A sign created by the Charter Township of Oakland stands in front of the Paint Creek Cider Mill and details the history of the statue and Hedge's Wigwam. The statue was part of a collection of historic artifacts owned by Dale Miller who purchased the cider mill property in 1945 in hopes of restoring the 1835 gristmill. This sign, as well as the plaque over Chief Pontiac, inaccurately identify the location of the late Hedge's Wigwam as Royal Oak.

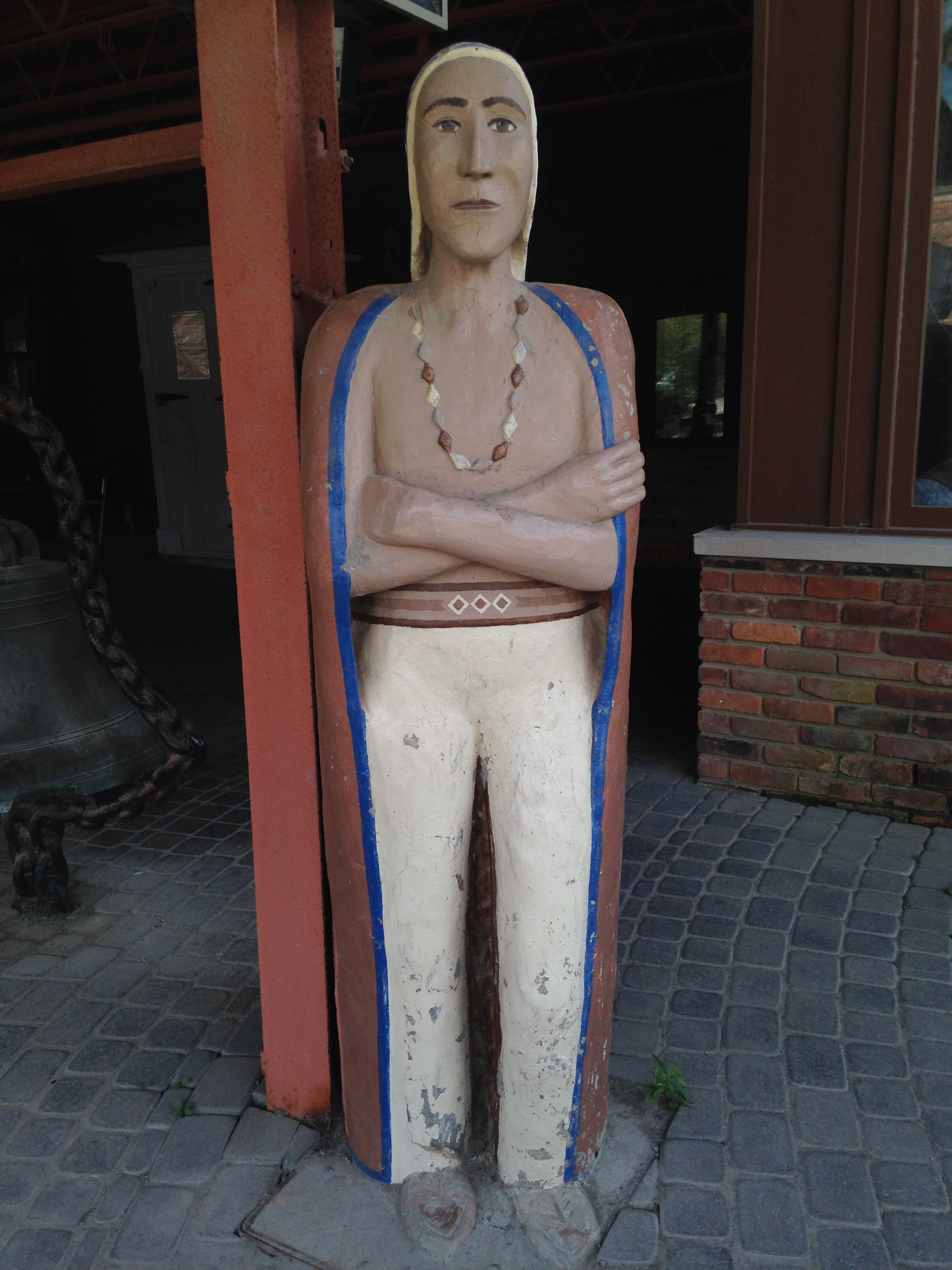
Paint Creek Cider Mill

A second statue was recently donated by a resident of Pleasant Ridge to the Royal Oak Historical Society museum, which is located one block from the Crooks Road portion of the Saginaw Trail. The statue was moved on August 7, 2015, from a home in Royal Oak to the entrance of the museum. The Royal Oak Historical Society is planning on painting the statue.

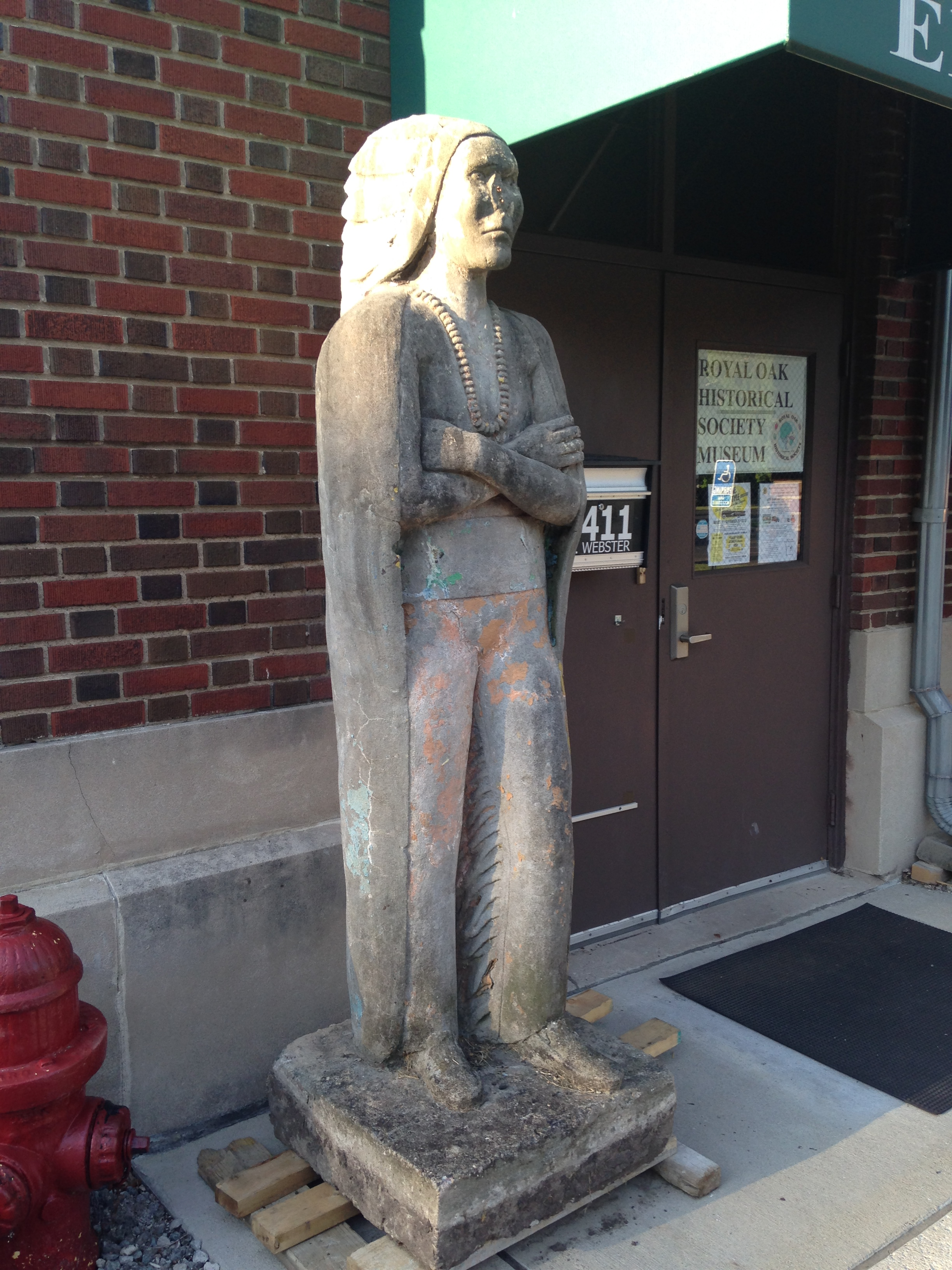
Royal Oak Museum

A third statue is located at Clarkston Union restaurant in Clarkston, Michigan.

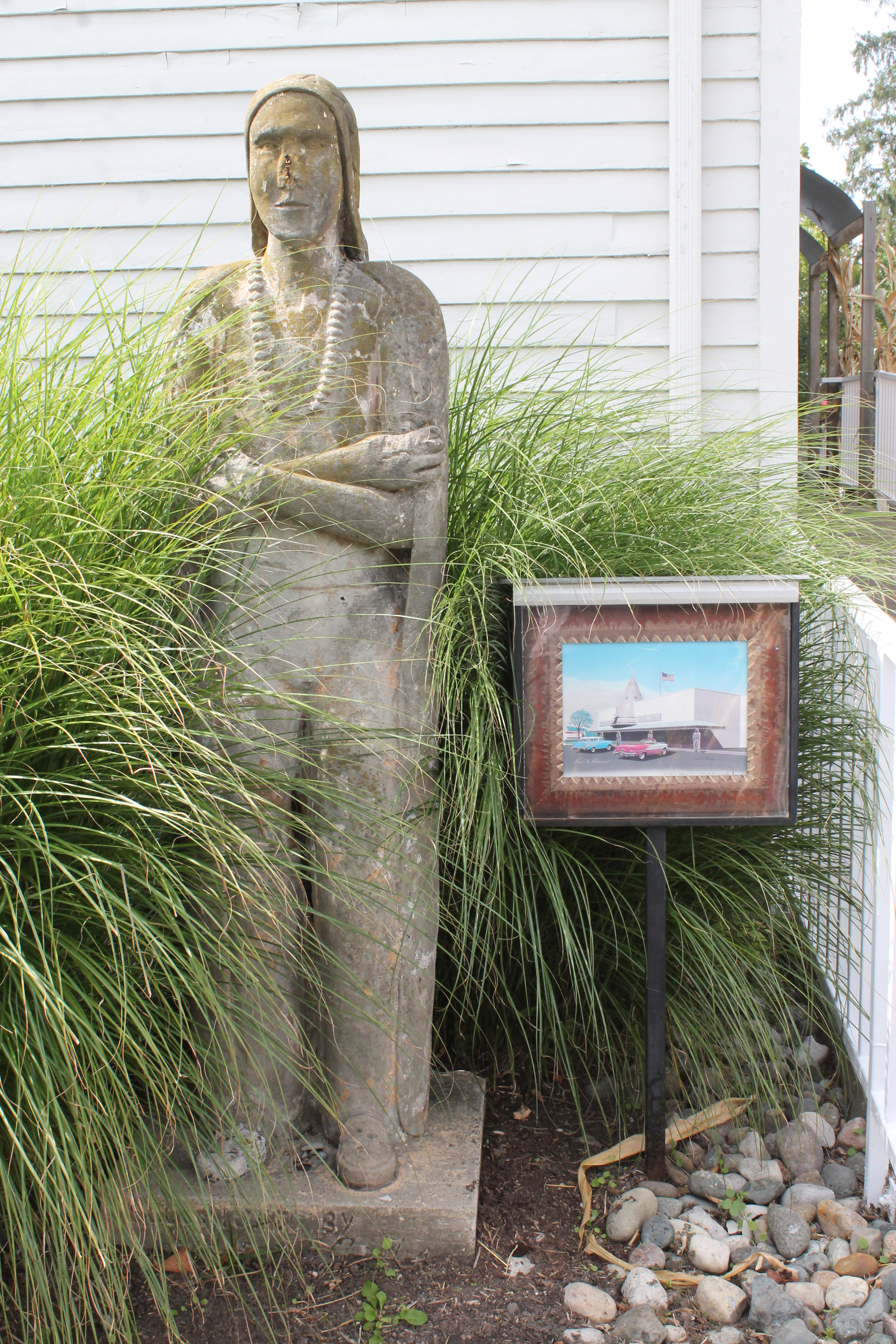
Clarkston Union

A fourth statue is located at a private residence in Royal Oak, Michigan and prominently displayed for the neighborhood to enjoy.

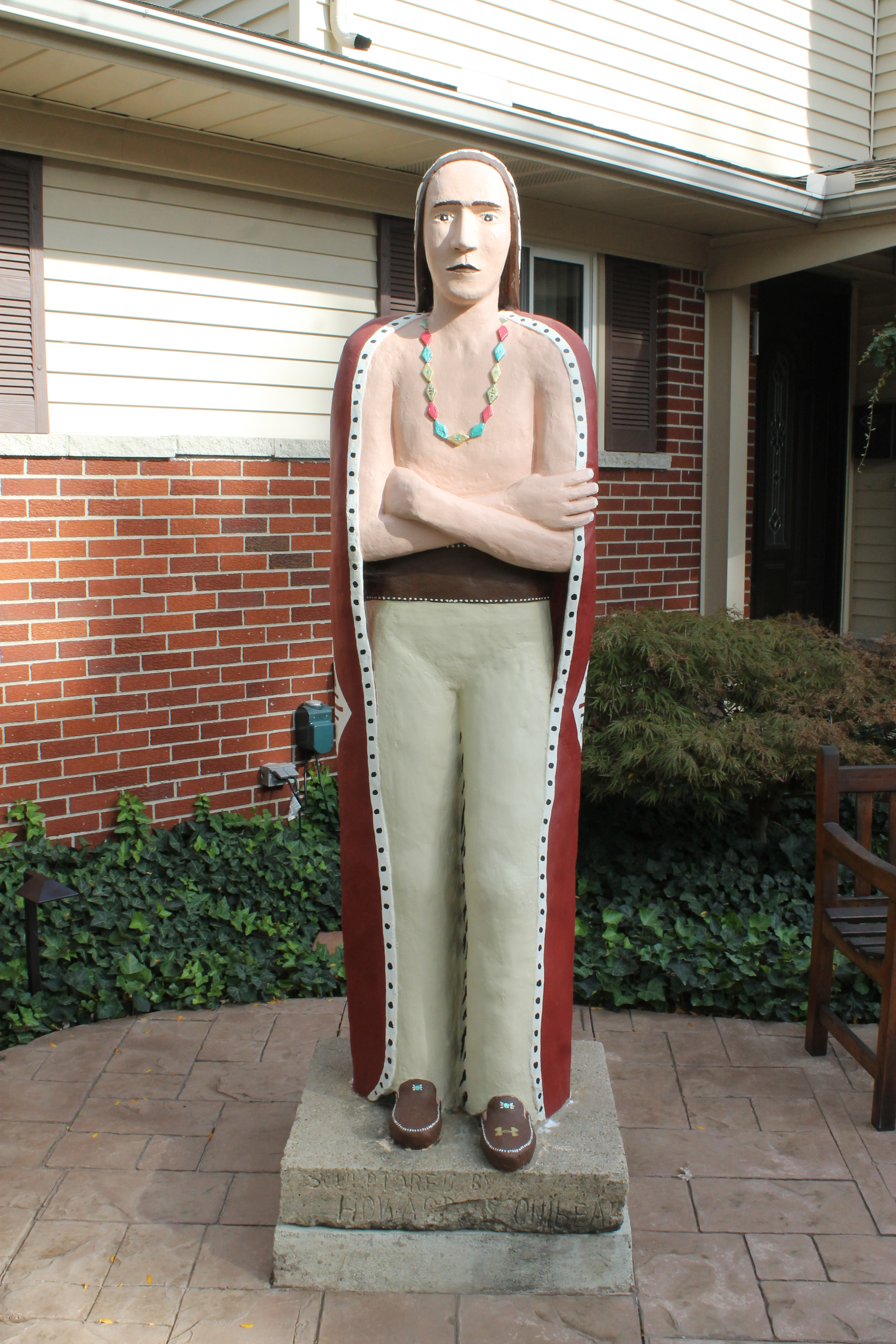
Royal Oak Resident's Home

The location of the remaining statue is unknown.

== Trading Post ==
The building was purchased in 1971 and was opened as the Trading Post, a boutique and antique store. After the Ferndale Fire Department inspected the building, no building permit was issued due to safety concerns. After a court battle, the Trading Post was opened on April 15, 1971. This was followed by ongoing battles between the City of Pleasant Ridge and the owner regarding safety violations, noise and crowd issues. On March 22, 1972, the Trading Post was destroyed by a fire. Although arson was determined as the cause, no suspect was ever named.
