= Religious Structures of Woodward Avenue Thematic Resource =

- Religious Structures of Woodward Avenue TR
- U.S. National Register of Historic Places
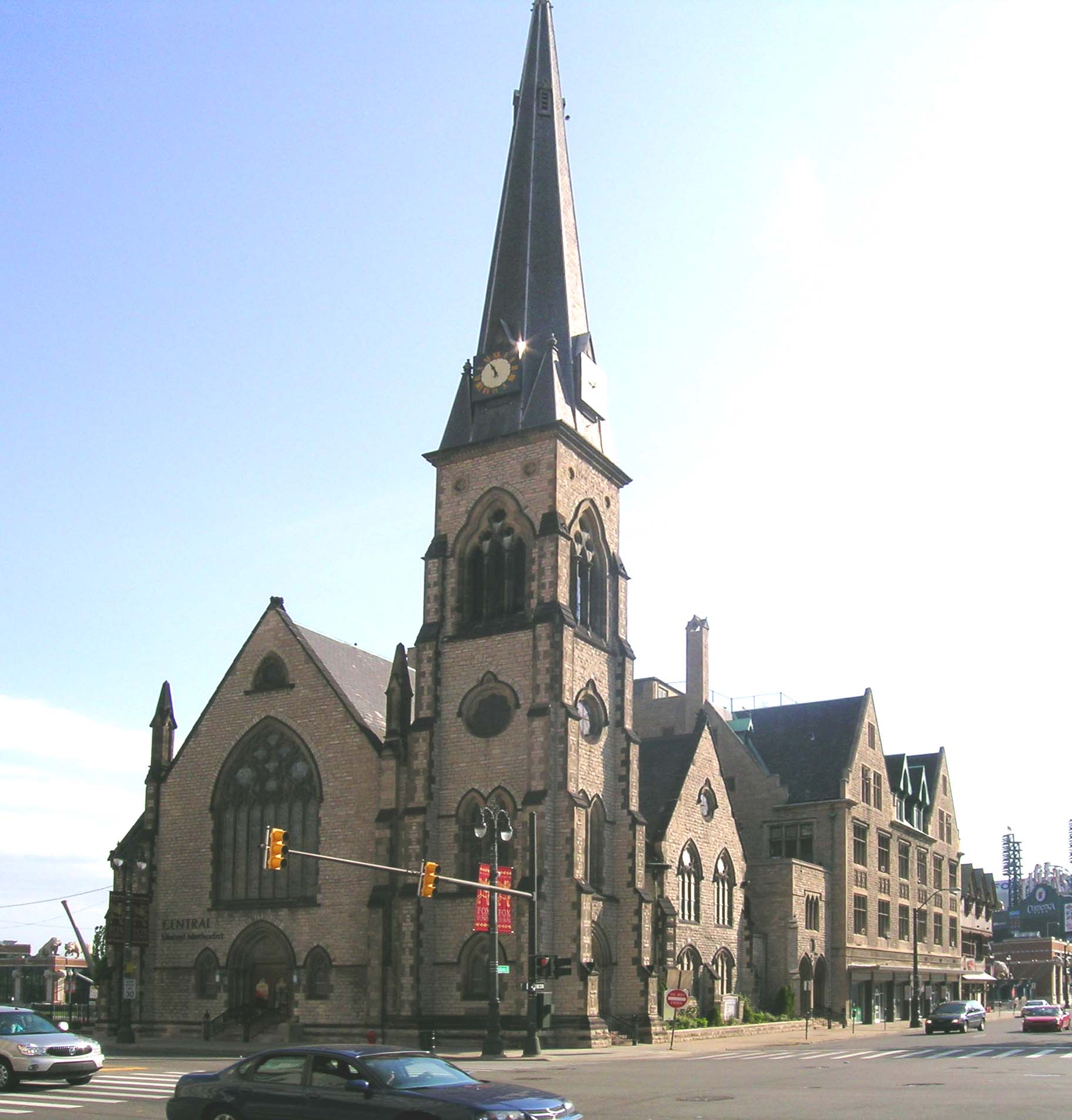
- Central United Methodist Church from across Woodward

- Location within Michigan Location within the United States
- Location: Detroit, Michigan
- Coordinates: 42°22′50″N 83°4′46″W
- Built: 1859–1929
- Architect: James Anderson, Sidney Rose Badgley, Hugh B. Clement, Ralph A. Cram, C. Howard Crane, Donaldson and Meier, J. Adam Fichter, William E. N. Hunter, Albert Jordan, Albert Kahn, Gordon W. Lloyd, Malcomson & Higginbotham, George D. Mason, James J. Nettleton, William H. Nicklas, Smith, Hinchman & Grylls, Guy J. Vinton, Henry A. Walsh
- Architectural style: Tudor Revival, Gothic Revival, Romanesque Revival, Beaux Arts, Classical Revival
- MPS: Religious Structures of Woodward Avenue TR
- NRHP reference No.: 82002893 - 82002896, 82002898, 82002899, 82002904, 82002905, 82002906, 82002908, 82002911, 82002912, 82002916, 82002918 - 82002921
- Added to NRHP: August 3, 1982

The Religious Structures of Woodward Avenue Thematic Resource (TR) is a multiple property submission to the National Register of Historic Places which was approved on August 3, 1982. The structures are located on Woodward Avenue in the cities of Detroit and Highland Park, Michigan.

== History ==
In the early part of the 19th century, residential growth in Detroit occurred primarily east and west of Woodward, along Fort Street and Jefferson Avenue. Woodward Avenue was first developed as a residential district during the Civil War, as the downtown district became more business-oriented. By the turn of the century, Woodward was developed as far north as the present location of Interstate 94 as an upperclass residential section; mansions of society's elite were interspersed with architecturally significant churches. Although only a few of the mansions along Woodward remain (of the handful still extant, the David Whitney House, Col. Frank J. Hecker House, and Samuel L. Smith House are all on the National Register), many of the churches are represented in this TR.

After the turn of the century, and as the automobile expanded the scope of the city, Woodward rapidly changed character from an upscale residential area to a mix of commercial and multiple-family dwellings. Heirs to the 19th century mansions lining Woodward were already ensconced in their own homes in Boston-Edison, Arden Park-East Boston, or Virginia Park, and as the owners of the Woodward properties died, their homes were broken into apartments or razed. As congregants moved northward, more churches were established north of Grand Boulevard to serve people in the area. A string of churches were constructed in the 1920s and 1930s in this area.

In 1909, the Highland Park Ford Plant was completed in Highland Park, and a substantial population increase occurred in that city. More churches were constructed in Highland Park near this time to meet their needs.

In 1935-1936, Woodward was substantially widened just north of downtown Detroit, and nearly every building on the east side of the street between downtown and Forest Avenue was torn down; many of the churches in this TR were required to rebuild their facades. In the 1950s and 60s, most of the rest of the early homes in the area were torn down.

== Significance ==
The structures in this TR are diverse in age and architectural style. Broken into age and style, there are:

- three High Victorian Gothic churches (1859-1887)
- two Richardson Romanesque structures (with two others already on the Register) (1889-1896)
- two neo-classical synagogues (1902-1922)
- five Gothic style, central-plan churches (1909-1926)
- seven neo-Gothic churches (1908-1930)

However, the structures are unified in that all are of stone (or brick with stone strim) construction. Most structures occupy corner lots, and most contain, in addition to the main church, a parich house, rectory, and/or smaller chapel. All structures sit well back from the streetline, save for those affected by the 1935-36 widening of Woodward.

These structures represent significant work by notable architects. Albert Kahn, who was best known for his concrete-reinforced industrial buildings, designed both of the Temples Beth-El (he was a congregant), as well as a portion of the First Congregational Church. Sidney Rose Badgley designed the Woodward Avenue Presbyterian Church as well as the Highland Park Presbyterian Church. The former is an excellent example of Badgley's trademark auditorium church style with steel-framed octagonal lantern dome atop. Ralph A. Cram designed the St. Paul Cathedral, and it is a major work early in the architect's career. Gordon W. Lloyd, who designed the Central United Methodist Church, was one of Michigan's most prominent late 19th century church architects. Likewise, William E. N. Hunter, who designed the Highland Park First United Methodist Church and the Metropolitan United Methodist Church, was one of Michigan's most prominent early 20th century church architects.

== Structures ==
The submission includes nineteen architecturally and historically significant structures, stretching over six miles along Woodward Avenue from Grand Circus Park in Detroit to just south of McNichols. The structures included, in order from south to north, are:

Resource name	Also known as	Image	Address	Built	City	Note
Central United Methodist Church			23 E. Adams (at Woodward)	1866	Detroit	
St. John's Episcopal Church			2326 Woodward (at Fisher Freeway)	1859	Detroit	
Woodward Avenue Baptist Church	United House of Jeremiah		2464 Woodward	1886	Detroit	The Woodward Avenue Baptist Church was destroyed by fire in 1986 and delisted in 1988.
First Unitarian Church of Detroit	Church of Christ of Detroit		2870 Woodward (at Edmund Place)	1889	Detroit	Destroyed by a fire in May 2014
Temple Beth-El	Bonstelle Theatre		3424 Woodward	1902	Detroit	
Cathedral Church of St. Paul			4800 Woodward (at Hancock)	1908	Detroit	
Our Lady of the Rosary Church	Saint Joseph's Episcopal Church		5930 Woodward (At Edsel Ford Freeway)	1883	Detroit	
Metropolitan United Methodist Church			8000 Woodward (at Chandler)	1922	Detroit	
Woodward Avenue Presbyterian Church	Abyssinia Church of God in Christ		8501 Woodward (at Philadelphia)	1908	Detroit	
First Baptist Church	Peoples Community Church		8601 Woodward (at Pingree)	1909	Detroit	
North Woodward Congregational Church	St. John's Christian Methodist Episcopal Church		8715 Woodward (at Blaine)	1911	Detroit	
Temple Beth-El	Bethel Community Transformation Center		8801 Woodward (at Gladstone)	1921	Detroit	
Saint Joseph's Episcopal Church	St. Matthew-St. Joseph Episcopal Church		8850 Woodward (at Holbrook)	1926	Detroit	
Central Woodward Christian Church	Little Rock Baptist Church		9000 Woodward	1926	Detroit	
Cathedral of the Most Blessed Sacrament			9844-54 Woodward (at Arden Park-Belmont)	1913	Detroit	
Highland Park Presbyterian Church	Park United Presbyterian Church		14 Cortland (at Woodward)	1910	Highland Park	
Grace Evangelical Lutheran Church	Prayer Temple of Love Cathedral		12375 Woodward (at Highland)	1929	Highland Park	
Trinity United Methodist Church	New Mt. Moriah Baptist Church		13100 Woodward	1922	Highland Park	
First United Methodist Church	Soul Harvest Ministries		16300 Woodward (at Church)	1916	Highland Park	

In addition, three other religious structures along Woodward were listed on the National Historic Register before the Religious Structures of Woodward Ave. TR was approved. These three are:

Resource Name	Also known as	Image	Address	Built	City	Note
Mariners' Church			Jefferson and Randolph	1849	Detroit	Added earlier (April 11, 1971)
First Presbyterian Church	Ecumenical Theological Seminary		2930 Woodward	1889	Detroit	Added earlier (December 19, 1979)
First Congregational Church			33 Forest (at Woodward)	1891	Detroit	Added earlier (July 4, 1979)

== See also ==
- List of buildings located along Woodward Avenue, Detroit
- Lower Woodward Avenue Historic District
- Midtown Woodward Historic District
