= First United Methodist Church (Highland Park, Michigan) =

Historic church in Michigan, United States

- U.S. National Register of Historic Places
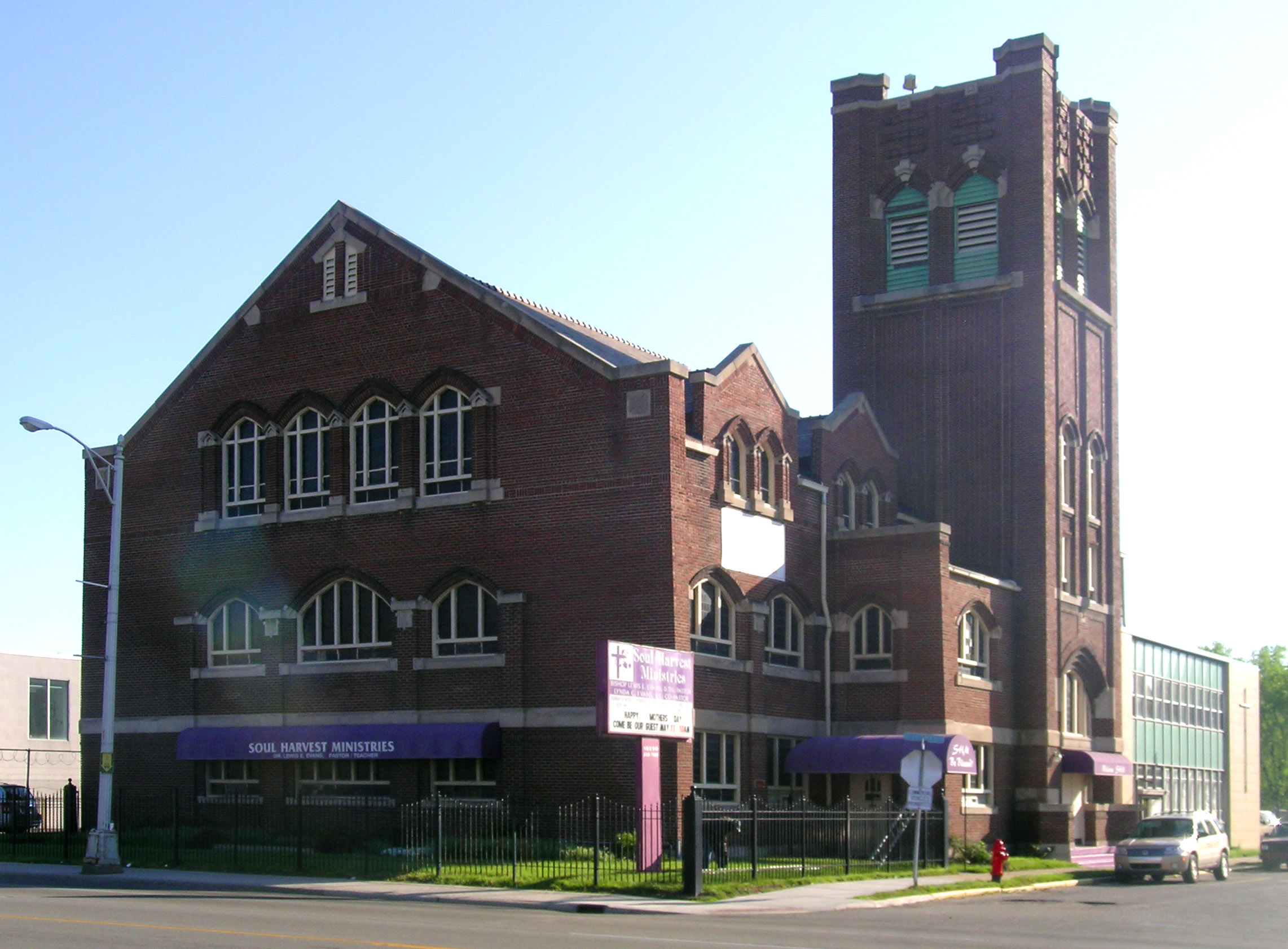
- First United Methodist Church, seen from across Woodward
- Interactive map
- Location: 16300 Woodward Avenue; Highland Park, Michigan
- Coordinates: 42°24′54.8″N 83°6′11.37″W
- Built: 1916
- Architect: William E. N. Hunter
- Architectural style: Late Gothic Revival
- MPS: Religious Structures of Woodward Ave. TR
- NRHP reference No.: 82002918
- Added to NRHP: August 3, 1982

The Soul Harvest Ministries is located at 16300 Woodward Avenue in Highland Park, Michigan. It was built in 1916 as the First United Methodist Church and was listed on the National Register of Historic Places in 1982.

== History ==
In 1868, a frame chapel for interdenominational services was built behind where the First United Methodist Church currently stands. Membership in this church declined in the 1880s, and the structure became an Episcopal chapel in 1885. In 1892, the chapel was sold to the Methodists for $1 (and assumption of the church debt).

The Methodist congregation received financial support from Michigan Senator Thomas Palmer and a retired Great Lakes sea captain, Thomas Stevens. This support allowed then to construct the present Gothic structure, which was built from 1916 to 1917. In 1956, the original frame chapel behind the present church was demolished, and a contemporary educational building was constructed.

Soul Harvest Ministries has occupied the building since 1995.

== Architecture ==
The church is an Arts and Crafts influenced, Gothic-style structure, constructed from red brick and trimmed with limestone. The church is rectangular in plan, measuring 108 feet by 95 feet. The Woodward Avenue elevation is a three-story gabled facade with banks of leaded windows, unified by projecting brick piers with limestone detailing. A square, flat-roofed tower with a louvered belfry graces the corner of the building. The main entrance, on the Church Street elevation, is sheltered by a broad arch at the base of the tower. The Church Street elevation also has two bays containing Gothic arched windows with gabled dormers. Ornamental brickwork is placed throughout the exterior.

The interior of the church is a modified Akron Plan, with a two-story central nave with sloping floors containing theatre seating. Perimeter spaces contain classrooms and overflow seating. The sanctuary is sightly raised and paneled in dark oak with a pitched beamed ceiling. It contains a carved wood altar, lecturn, and organ. The interior contains tiled floors, Arts and Crafts style oak woodwork, and tapestry brick wainscoting inset with Pewabic tiles throughout.
