= North Woodward Congregational Church =

Historic church in Michigan, United States

- U.S. National Register of Historic Places
- Michigan State Historic Site
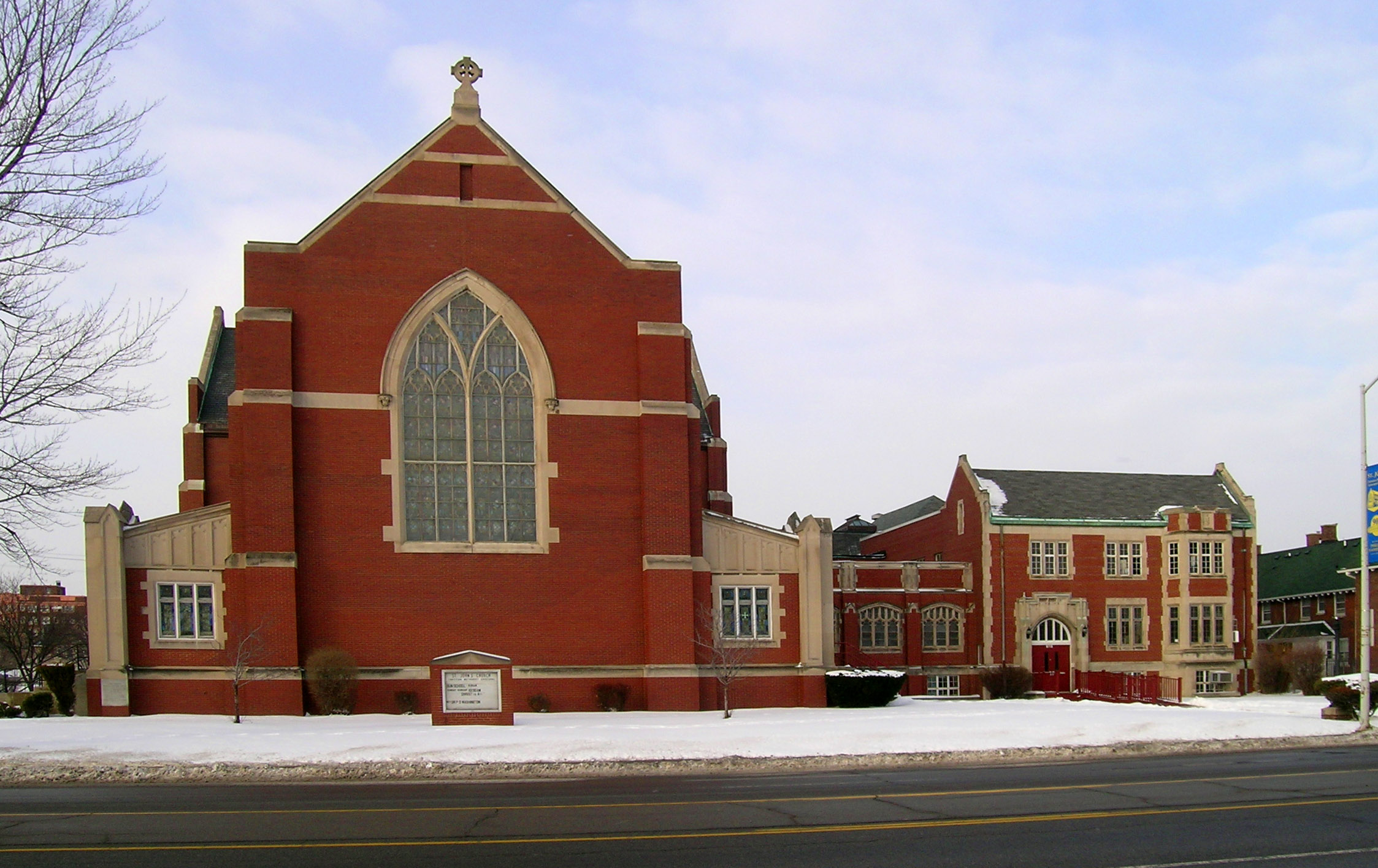
- Interactive map
- Location: 8715 Woodward Avenue; Detroit, Michigan
- Coordinates: 42°22′46.95″N 83°4′48.83″W
- Built: 1911
- Architect: Hugh B. Clement
- Architectural style: Late Gothic Revival
- MPS: Religious Structures of Woodward Avenue TR
- NRHP reference No.: 82002905

Significant dates
- Added to NRHP: August 3, 1982
- Designated MSHS: September 3, 1998

The St. John's Christian Methodist Episcopal Church is a church located in Detroit, Michigan. It was built as the North Woodward Congregational Church, listed on the National Register of Historic Places in 1982, and designated a Michigan State Historic Site in 1998.

== History ==
The North Woodward Congregational Church was built in stages, with a small chapel, designed by the firm of Malcomson and Higginbotham, on the site of the present church constructed as early as 1907. The construction of the main sanctuary began in 1911 and was completed in 1912. Sections were added, with the most recent, the church house, being added in 1929. By the 1950s, the congregation had substantially moved out of Detroit, and the building was sold to the St. John's Christian Methodist Episcopal Church congregation. This congregation had been organized on July 8, 1917, as St. John's Colored Methodist Episcopal Church. A State of Michigan historical marker commemorates this church. The official denominational name was changed from "Colored" to "Christian" in 1954. St. John's Christian Methodist Episcopal Church was the first C.M.E. church established in the state of Michigan and, as of 2009, it remains the largest and most recognized Christian Methodist congregation in the state. The Reverend Dr. Joseph B. Gordon, a native Detroiter, was appointed as pastor in 2008. In August 2014, Rev. Dr. Claude Bass became the church's pastor. In August 2018, Rev. A Richard Doss became the church's pastor.

== Building ==
The architect retained by the Congregationalists was Hugh Clement. He designed a Gothic red brick church with limestone trim, having Prairie and Arts & Crafts influences. The building is lower than many Gothic churches, as it lacks a bell tower or lantern. The historical site also includes nine associated row houses along Gladstone Avenue.
