= Trinity United Methodist Church (Highland Park, Michigan) =

Historic church in Michigan, United States

- U.S. National Register of Historic Places
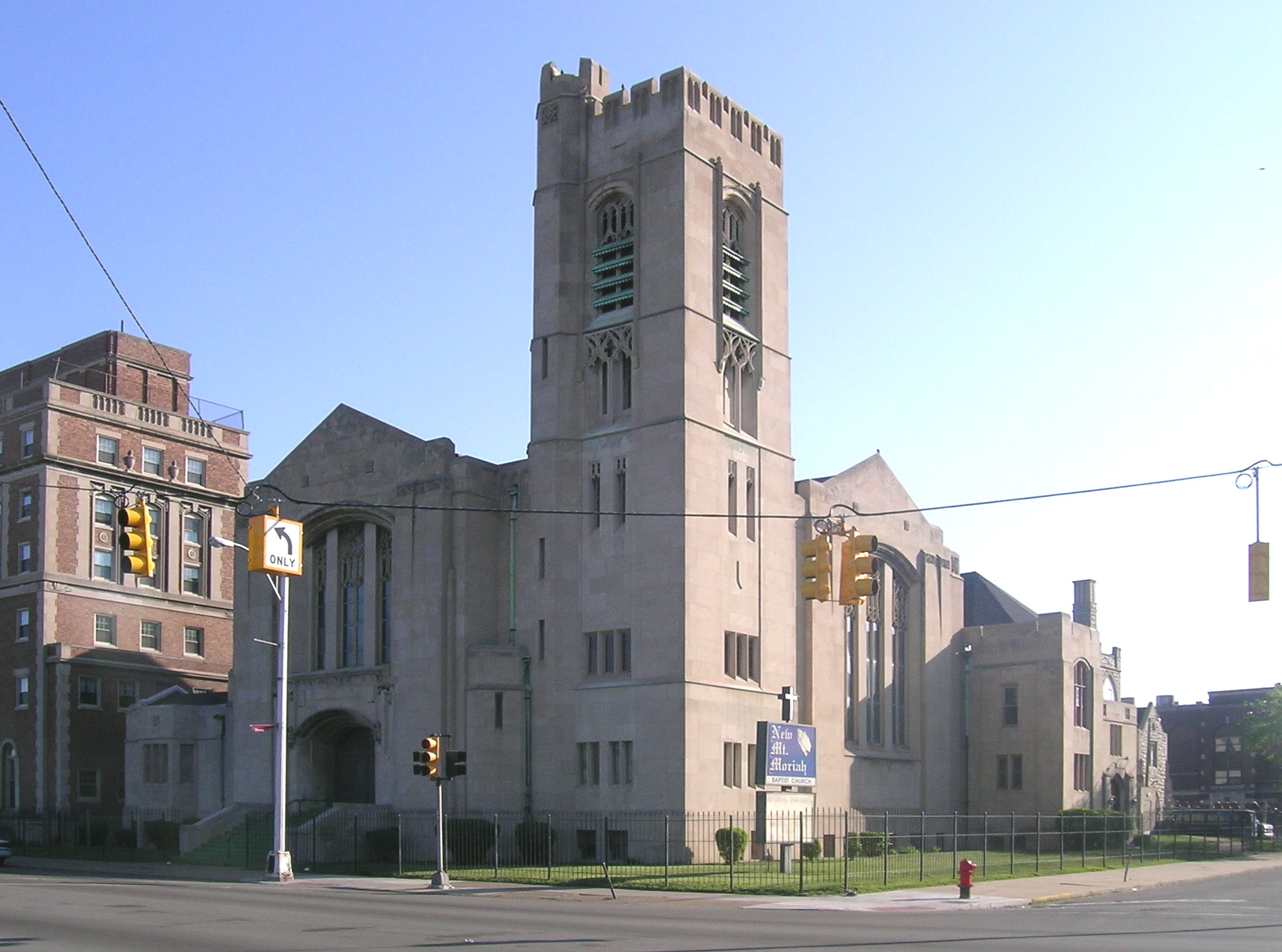
- Trinity United Methodist Church seen from across Woodward
- Interactive map
- Location: 13100 Woodward Avenue; Highland Park, Michigan
- Coordinates: 42°24′4.53″N 83°5′36.89″W
- Built: 1922
- Architect: George D. Mason
- Architectural style: Gothic Revival
- MPS: Religious Structures of Woodward Ave. TR
- NRHP reference No.: 82002921
- Added to NRHP: August 3, 1982

The New Mt. Moriah Baptist Church is located at 13100 Woodward Avenue in Highland Park, Michigan in Metro Detroit. It was built in 1922 as the Trinity United Methodist Church, in the Gothic Revival style. It was listed on the National Register of Historic Places in 1982.

== History ==
Trinity United Methodist was built by the Cass United Methodist Church of Detroit, as a mission church to serve membership in Highland Park who lived too far to travel the eight miles to Cass United. The structure served as a Methodist church from its dedication in 1923 until 1978. In the 1950s the church had a mission for Japanese people.

After Trinity left the building in 1978, the next year the New Mt. Moriah Baptist Church congregation moved into the building. New Mt. Moriah was established in 1952. As of 2021, the church remained in the building, led by Rev. Eddie Cooper, Jr., Pastor and First Lady Carlethia Cooper.

== Architecture ==
The former Trinity United Methodist Church is a gray limestone, Gothic Revival church measuring 125 feet by 110 feet. The main facade has a gabled, two-story entrance pavilion with a recessed entrance located between a plain extension and a crenelated tower with belfry. On the side, there is a shallow, gabled transept with a large window, and a projecting entrance between the church and attached chapel.
