= St. Joseph's Episcopal Church, 1926 (Detroit) =

Historic church in Michigan, United States

- St. Joseph's Episcopal Church
- U.S. National Register of Historic Places
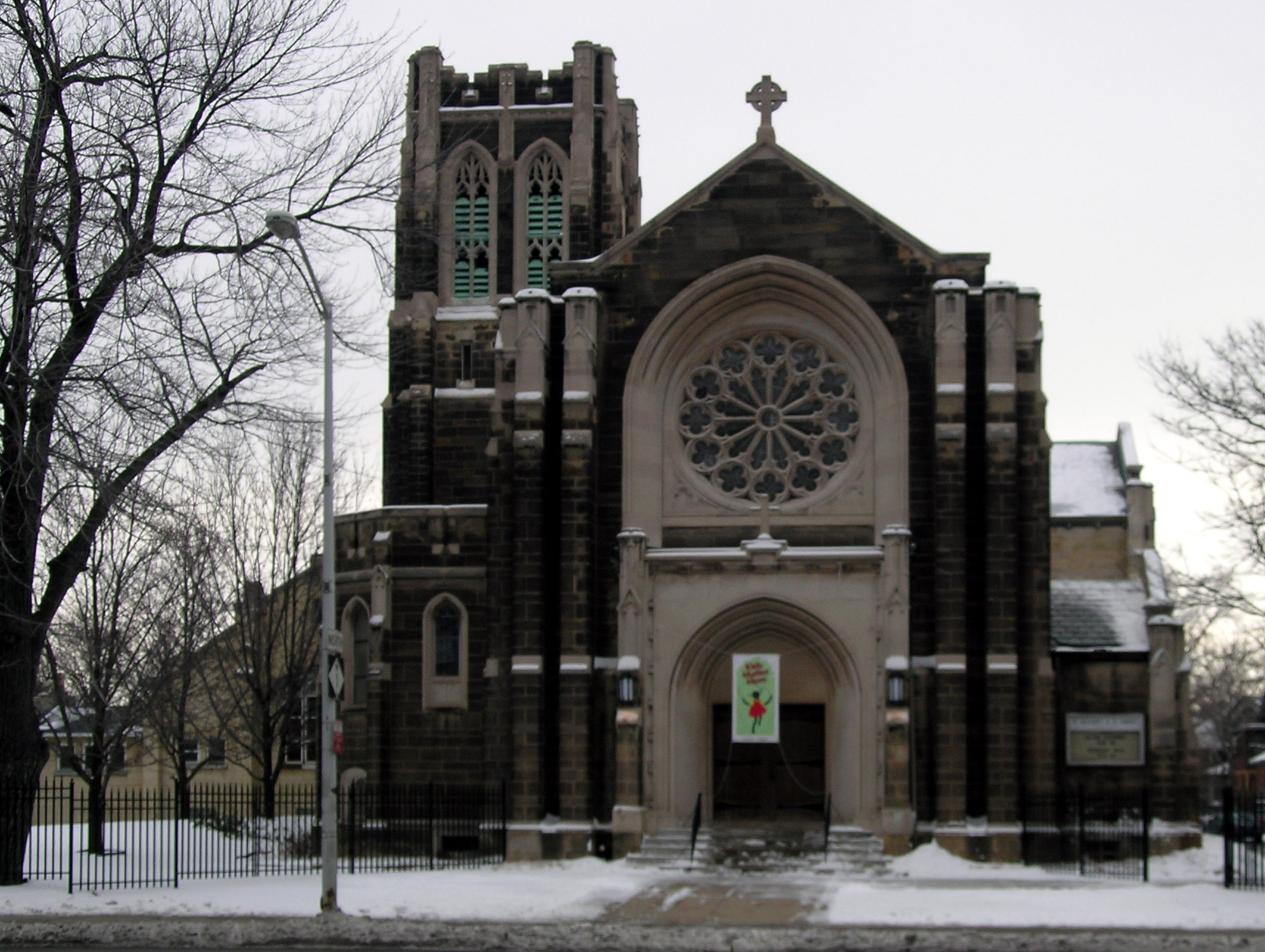
- Interactive map
- Location: 8850 Woodward Avenue; Detroit, Michigan
- Coordinates: 42°22′52.17″N 83°4′47.25″W
- Built: 1926
- Architect: James J. Nettleton
- Architectural style: Late Gothic Revival
- MPS: Religious Structures of Woodward Avenue TR
- NRHP reference No.: 82002909
- Added to NRHP: August 3, 1982

St. Joseph's Episcopal Church, now known as St. Matthew's-St. Joseph's Episcopal Church, is a historic Episcopal church located at 8850 Woodward Avenue in Detroit, Michigan, and is part of the Episcopal Diocese of Michigan. It was added to the National Register of Historic Places in 1982.

== History ==
This building was constructed in 1926 as a successor to the earlier St. Joseph's Episcopal Church at 5930 Woodward Avenue. In 1971, St. Matthew's Episcopal, the second oldest African American congregation in Detroit, merged with St. Joseph's.

== Building ==
The church building is a typical Gothic structure built from dark coursed sandstone with light sandstone trim. It has a narrow gabled nave and projecting side aisles and projecting transepts. A large rose window faces Woodward, sitting above a recessed entrance. A tall, square bell tower and parish house sit against the north transept. The sides are buttressed, with Gothic clerestory windows.

The architect, James J. Nettleton, was a member of the St. Joseph's congregation and graduate of the architecture program at Cornell University.
