= Our Lady of the Rosary Church (Detroit) =

- St. Joseph's Episcopal Church
- U.S. National Register of Historic Places
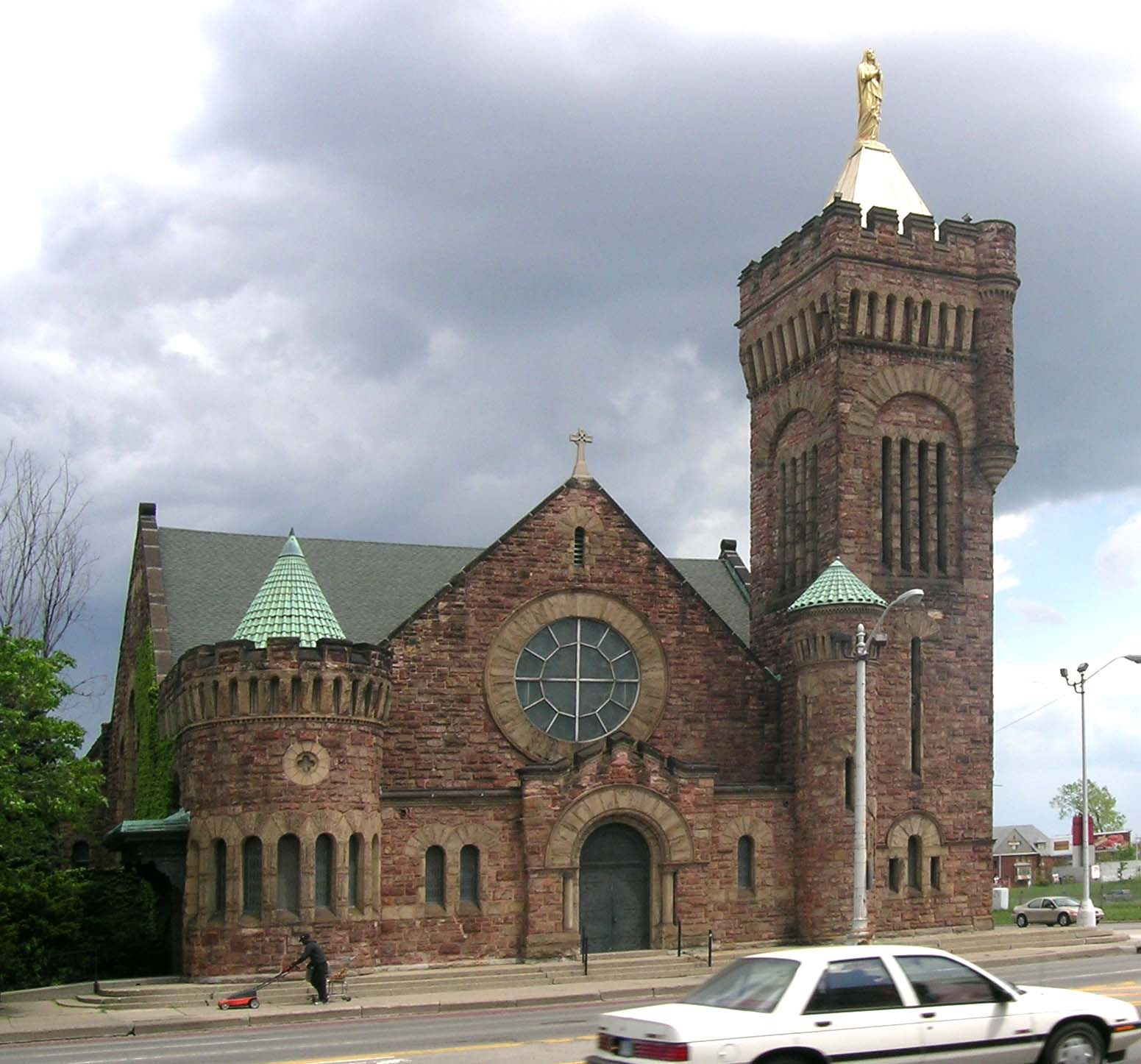
- Viewed from across Woodward
- Interactive map
- Location: 5930 Woodward Avenue; Detroit, Michigan
- Coordinates: 42°21′53″N 83°4′9″W
- Built: 1883, 1896
- Architect: Malcomson and Higginbotham
- Architectural style: Romanesque Revival
- MPS: Religious Structures of Woodward Ave. TR
- NRHP reference No.: 82002908
- Added to NRHP: August 3, 1982

The Our Lady of the Rosary Church is a Roman Catholic church located at 5930 Woodward Avenue in Detroit, Michigan. It was originally built as St. Joseph's Episcopal Church – from 1893 to 1896 – and is a historic Romanesque Revival church complex. It was added to the National Register of Historic Places on August 3, 1982.

== History ==
The original building in this complex, St. Joseph's Memorial Chapel, was a gift of Mrs. L.R. Medbury, and was built on the corner or Woodward and Medbury (now the Edsel Ford service drive). The chapel, consecrated in 1884, soon proved too small, and a larger church, completed in 1896, was erected facing Woodward.

In 1906, St. Joseph's congregation merged with that of the congregation of the nearby St. Paul's Cathedral. The St. Joseph's building was sold to Father Francis J. VanAntwerp in 1907, and Our Lady of the Rosary Roman Catholic Church was established. The new congregation altered some of the church's structure, extending the nave and adding an oversized, gilded statue of the Blessed Virgin Mary atop the south tower's hipped roof.

In 2021, the church became the location of Detroit Catholic Campus Ministry which serves the campuses of Wayne State University, University of Michigan-Dearborn, the College for Creative Studies, and Henry Ford College, along with other surrounding campuses.

== Architecture ==
The church, built from 1893 to 1896, is a massive rock-faced, cross-gable-roofed, sandstone Romanesque Revival structure. The gabled façade is flanked by two towers: a tall, square, pyramid-roofed tower to the south and a round, conical-roofed tower on the north. The entrance between the towers is into a one-story vestibule; it is surmounted by a large rose window.

== See also ==
- St. Joseph's Episcopal Church, 1926 (Detroit, Michigan)
