= Edgar Dewitt Jones =

American clergyman (1876-1956)

Edgar Dewitt Jones (1876–1956) was an American clergyman, ecumenist, and author, born December 5, 1876, at Hearne, Tex., and educated at Transylvania University where he was a member of the Alpha-Omicron chapter of Kappa Sigma fraternity, University of Missouri and Illinois Wesleyan University. He first studied law but later turned to theology, studying at the College of the Bible, now Lexington Theological Seminary. After completing his seminary education, he was ordained at Independence Boulevard Christian Church in Kansas City, MO, which was served as pastor by Dr. George Hamilton Combs. He was married in 1902 to Frances Willis. The couple had six children, five of whom lived to maturity—Edgar Dewitt Jones, Jr.; Mrs. Thomas Sherrard; Mrs. John R. Walker; Willis R. Jones, and W. Westbrook Jones.

== Ministries ==
He became a minister of the Disciples of Christ denomination in 1901 and held pastorates in Kentucky, Ohio, Illinois, and Michigan. Following graduation from the College of the Bible 1901, he took charge of four rural congregations in Boone County, Kentucky, one of which was the church in Bullitsville, which served as the basis of his novel published in 1917 Fairhope, the Annals of a Country Church. He took up residence at Erlanger, KY, living in a boarding house until his marriage to Frances Rumble. He would organize a congregation in Erlanger in 1902, while giving up three of his other charges—the exception being Bullitsville. From there he was called to Cleveland's historic Franklin Circle Christian Church, which he served for three years beginning in 1903. In 1906, four months short of his thirtieth birthday, he was called to serve as pastor of First Christian Church of Bloomington, IL, where stayed for fourteen years, during which time the congregation grew to nearly two thousand members. It was during this period that Jones began his writing career, publishing his first book in 1914 -- "The Inner Circle." Additionally, during this period he served as president of the Illinois Convention of the Disciples (1915-1916) and then as the President of the International Convention of the Disciples (1917-1919).

Having risen to prominence in the Disciples, Jones looked to move to a congregation in a large urban setting. Thus, in 1920 he became the pastor of Central Christian Church in Detroit, MI. Central Christian Church, at this time, was significantly smaller than First Christian Church, Bloomington, IL, but Detroit was in the midst of a period of significant growth and lacked a high-profile Disciples of Christ presence. He came to the church having been promised that the congregation was intent upon building a new, larger, facility. By 1922, after a significant illness and then death of the congregation's leading benefactor, Philip Gray, it became clear that the plans would have to be abandoned. Feeling that Central could not fulfill the dreams he had for an influential urban congregation, Jones requested that the church develop a workable building plan or he would resign. In may of 1922 he tendered his resignation, but in the end the congregation prevailed upon him to stay, which he did. It was at this time, that a group from within Central began conversations with leadership at Woodward Avenue Christian Church, which sat on one of Detroit's major thoroughfares, about merging. At first these discussions were scuttled, when the pastor of the Woodward Avenue Church voiced opposition.

This meeting was held without the presence of either of the ministers, and when the able young pastor at the Woodward Avenue Church heard of it he was much disturbed, since he had his own plans for a new building and some funds set aside for that purpose. For a time this minister, with whom I had been on friendly terms, suspected that I was the moving spirit in this merger proposition, which I was not at that time. It is always a mistake to go over the head of the pastor, who is the head of the local church and should be consulted in every project. This action, made with the best of intentions, fell through for the time in its purpose, and it was not until years later that that minister understood all the facts and we became friends again.

In 1926, after a new pastor had come to Woodward Avenue, the two congregations were able to complete the merger, with the Woodward Avenue pastor gave way to the more prominent Jones. In addition, members of a smaller, and more conservative congregation, the Plum Street Christian Church joined with the larger congregation. Later members of the Grand River Christian Church, after a split in that congregation, joined with Central Woodward.

The merged congregations then began the project of building a new building on the site of the Woodward Avenue Christian Church, with the new congregation taking the name Central Woodward Christian Church. In a speech given in 1975 on the fiftieth anniversary of the announced merger, Jones's son, Willis R. Jones, noted that the two congregations brought different strengths. Central Christian Church, which lay on Second Avenue, had among its members a number of civic and industrial leaders, along with the financial support of the Philip Gray family, while the Woodward Avenue congregation, besides having a prime location, had a large contingent of younger members, including youth. Detroit, by then the fifth largest city in America, now had a significant Disciples of Christ presence.

Jones remained pastor of this congregation until he retired in 1946. In 1922 he joined the staff of the Detroit News contributing two columns -- "Successful Living" and "Experiences." . As a religious leader, he served as President of the Federal Council of Churches (1936–1938) and the Association for the Promotion of Christian Unity (later the Council on Christian Unity), a Disciples of Christ entity.

== Writings ==
A prolific writer, perhaps his most important book was The Royalty of the Pulpit (Harper, 1951). This book is a study of Yale University's "Lyman Beecher Lectures on Preaching" from 1872 until 1950. He served as a correspondent for a time with the Detroit News, and wrote a regular column for the paper entitled "Successful Living."

Beyond his leadership in the religious community, he was a student of Abraham Lincoln, collecting memorabilia and papers, and hosting an annual Lincoln dinner that featured as speakers eminent students of Lincoln. His Lincoln Collection can now be found at the Detroit Public Library.

His writings include:

- The Inner Circle (1914)
- The Wisdom of God's Fools (1916)
- Fairhope, The Annals of a Country Church (1917)
- The Tender Pilgrims (1917)
- Ornamented Orthodoxy (1918)
- When Jesus Wrote on the Ground (1924)
- The Wisdom of Washington and the Learning of Lincoln (1924)
- Blundering into Paradise (1932)
- American Preachers of Today: Intimate Appraisals of Thirty-two Leaders (1933)
- The Great Business of Being Christian (1938)
- A Man Stood Up to Preach (1943)
- The Coming of the Perfect (1946)
- Lincoln and the Preachers (1948)
- The Royalty of the Pulpit (1951).
- Sermons I Love to Preach (1953).

His living descendants are his grand children Paul Dewitt Jones, Jack Franklin Jones, Thomas Johnson Sherrard and John Edgar Sherrard, each having children of their own.

"Jones, Edgar Dewitt," by Clinton Holloway, in The Encyclopedia of the Stone-Campbell Movement, (Wm. B. Eerdmans, 2004).

"Biographical Sketch of Edgar Dewitt Jones," in Moore, W. T. (editor), The New Living Pulpit of the Christian Church (St. Louis: Christian Board of Publication, 1918). Online edition at

Willis R. Jones, "Two into One," (speech given at Central Woodward Christian Church (1975)
