= Grace University Lutheran Church (Minneapolis, Minnesota) =

Historic church in Minnesota, United States

- U.S. National Register of Historic Places
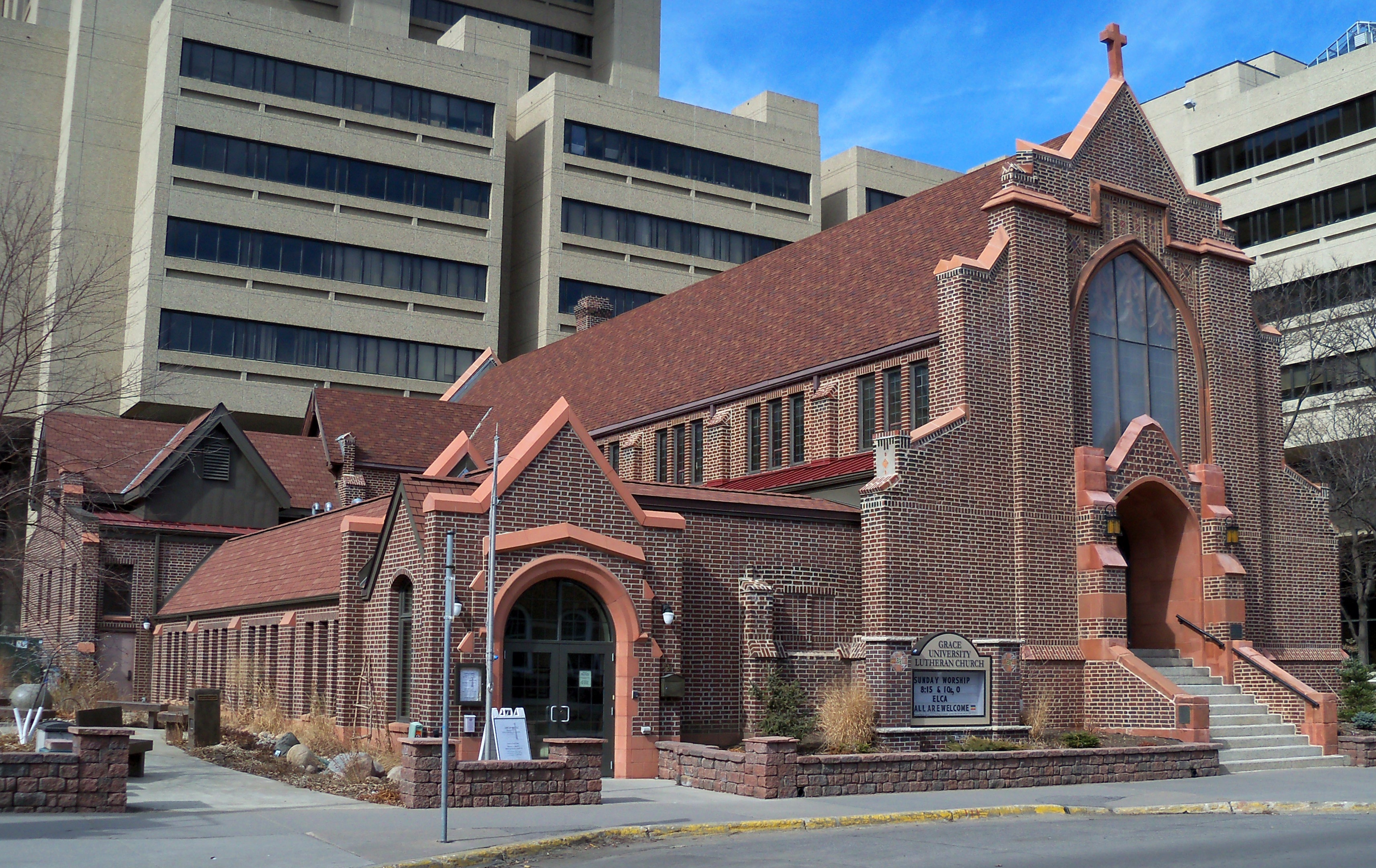

- Location within Minnesota Location within the United States
- Location: 324 Harvard St., Minneapolis, Minnesota
- Coordinates: 44°58′22″N 93°13′50″W
- Built: 1915
- Architect: Cecil Chapman
- Architectural style: Late Gothic Revival
- NRHP reference No.: 96001557
- Added to NRHP: January 9, 1997

Grace University Lutheran Church is a church in Minneapolis, Minnesota, United States, adjacent to the University of Minnesota East Bank campus. The church was built in 1915–1917 by a Swedish Lutheran congregation to serve neighborhood families and university students. It was designed by Chapman and Magney and built in the Gothic Revival style.

The congregation was organized in Minneapolis in 1903 by the Swedish immigrant-dominated Augustana Evangelical Lutheran Church. At the time, Minnesota boasted a large population of Swedish immigrants. In 1905, the state had 126,000 Swedes, of whom 38,000 lived in Minneapolis and Saint Paul. In Minneapolis, there was a concentration of Swedish settlers in the Seven Corners neighborhood, around Washington and Cedar Avenues, on the west bank of the Mississippi River. Grace Church was organized as one of the first English-speaking congregations of the Augustana Synod in Minneapolis. In 1914, the congregation merged with Swedish Evangelical Lutheran Sharon Church of Minneapolis, located on the east bank of the Mississippi.

The two congregations, now united under the name Grace Evangelical Lutheran Church, decided to sell their individual properties and build a common church near the University of Minnesota and Minnesota College, a school run by the synod. Minnesota College donated land at the corner of Harvard and Delaware Streets, and the church retained the firm of Chapman and Magney to design their new building. The firm was also responsible for designing the Sumner Community Library in 1915 and the Saxe Movie Theater, later the Forum Cafeteria, in 1914. The design was well-received, and construction of the new church building began in late 1915. The first service was held on December 24, 1916, in the basement of the partially completed building. Construction was finished in late 1917, and the church was dedicated on December 9, 1917. However, the congregation had run short on funds for furnishing the interior, so some temporary lighting fixtures and seating were used until the congregation could afford permanent furnishings.

The building was listed on the National Register of Historic Places in 1997.
