= Grace Evangelical Lutheran Church (Highland Park, Michigan) =

Historic church in Michigan, United States

- U.S. National Register of Historic Places
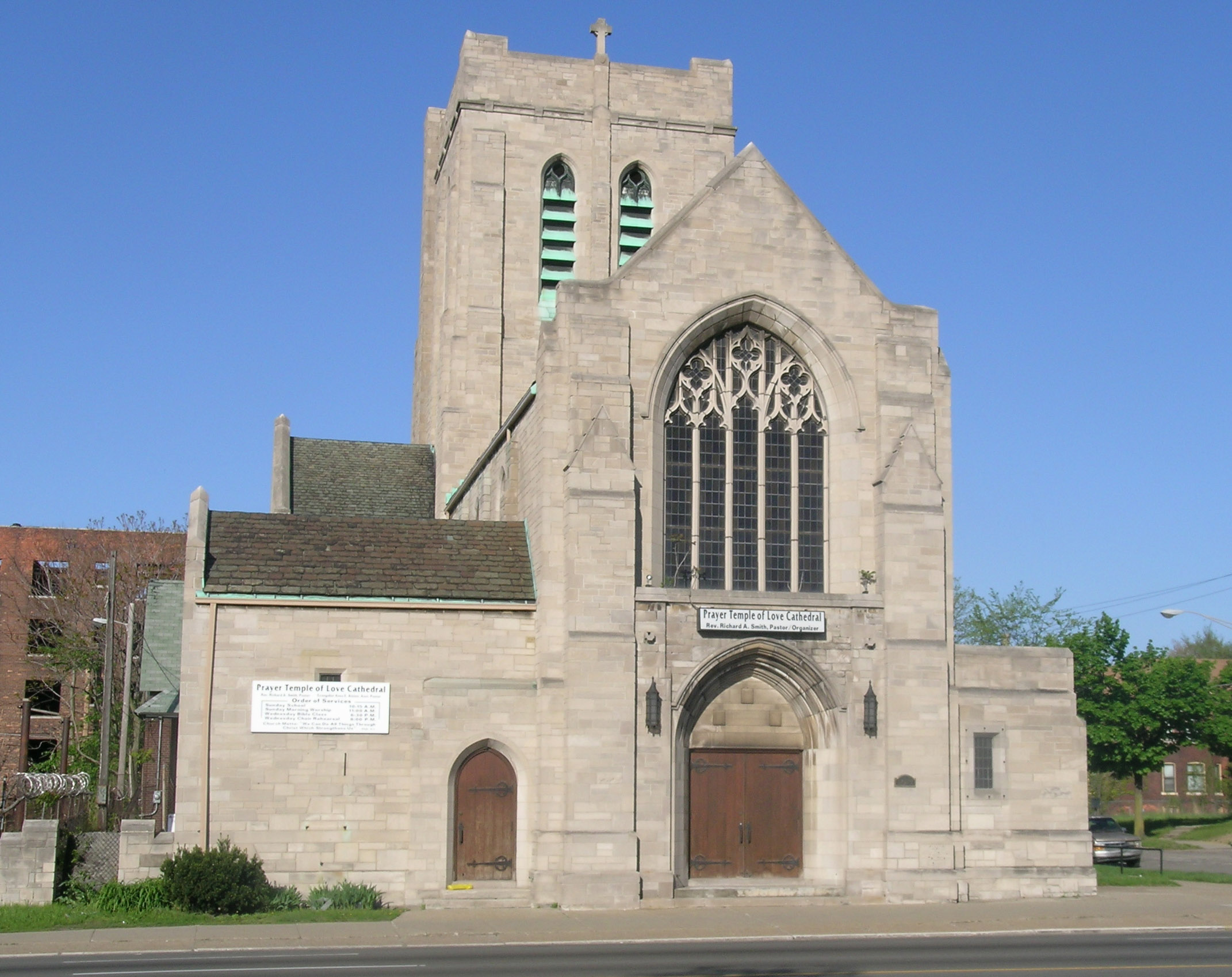
- Grace Evangelical Lutheran Church seen from across Woodward Avenue
- Interactive map
- Location: 12375 Woodward Avenue; Highland Park, Michigan
- Coordinates: 42°23′51.65″N 83°5′32.08″W
- Built: 1929
- Architect: J. Adam Fichter
- Architectural style: Late Gothic Revival
- MPS: Religious Structures of Woodward Avenue TR
- NRHP reference No.: 82002919
- Added to NRHP: August 3, 1982

The Prayer Temple of Love Cathedral is located at 12375 Woodward Avenue in Highland Park, Michigan. It was built in 1929 as the Grace Evangelical Lutheran Church, and was listed on the National Register of Historic Places in 1982.

== History ==
Grace Evangelical Lutheran Church was originally a mission on the west side of Detroit, known as the Detroit Immanuel Evangelical Lutheran Church. The congregation originally worshipped in built a frame Victorian Gothic chapel (built for the Highland Park Presbyterian congregation) one block south of the current site. The present cathedral was built from 1929 to 1930, and was used by the congregation until 1979, when the Grace Evangelical congregation sold their church building to an Apostolic African-American congregation. The building is now known as the Prayer Temple of Love Cathedral.

== Architecture ==
The building is a relatively small, random ashlar, limestone, Neo-Gothic-style structure. It has a tall, gabled nave with lower side aisles extending back to gabled transepts. The entrance is flanked by shallow buttresses, and a large traceried Gothic window dominates the facade. A square, flat-roofed tower with louvered belfry is above the crossing where the nave meets the transepts. The roof is dark slate, contrasting with the masonry of the walls. At the rear of the church is the cross-gabled, Victorian Gothic structure which served the congregation until the present building was erected. A two-story, hip-roofed brick parsonage is also on the property.
