= W. Hawkins Ferry House =

Historic house in Michigan, United States

- William Hawkins Ferry House
- U.S. National Register of Historic Places
- Interactive map
- Location: 874 Lake Shore Rd., Grosse Pointe Shores, Michigan
- Coordinates: 42°26′32″N 82°52′32″W
- Area: 1 acre (0.40 ha)
- Built: 1964
- Architect: William Henry Kessler, Carl Johnson
- Architectural style: Modern architecture
- NRHP reference No.: 100003936
- Added to NRHP: May 9, 2019

The W. Hawkins Ferry House, or William Hawkins Ferry House, is a private house located at 874 Lake Shore Road in Grosse Pointe Shores, Michigan. It was listed on the National Register of Historic Places in 2019.

== W. Hawkins Ferry ==
William Hawkins Ferry (or, more usually, W. Hawkins Ferry) was born in 1914 in Detroit, one of four children of businessman and politician Dexter M. Ferry Jr. and his wife Jeanette (Hawkins) Ferry. W. Hawkins's grandfather, Dexter M. Ferry, had founded the highly successful D.M. Ferry & Co seed company, which dominated the seed market at the turn of the century. W. Hawkins Ferry spent his childhood in Detroit and Grosse Pointe and attended Cranbrook. He attended Harvard University, graduating in 1937, then studied architecture at the Harvard Graduate School of Design. He dabbled in architectural design, but soon turned to art and architectural history. He was an important art collector and donor, and a trustee of the Detroit Institute of Arts. He was a proponent of Detroit architecture, and recorded and exhibited a breadth of architectural works throughout Detroit. His work culminated in the 1968 publication of the definitive book on Detroit area architecture, The Buildings of Detroit: A History. Ferry was also a proponent of Modern architecture, and appreciated the novel methods and look of the style. William Hawkins Ferry died in his home in 1988.

== W. Hawkins Ferry House history ==
Ferry lived in his family home until 1959, when he moved into a speculative home he had designed himself. However, he thought of this home as "transitional," and soon was looking for a new place to live. He purchased a lot on Lake St. Clair containing an old frame house, and selected architect William Henry Kessler to design a new home. He also hired Carl Johnson to design the surrounding landscape. Kessler and Ferry integrated spaces for Ferry's art collection into the design of the home. The house was completed in 1964; Ferry moved in and lived there until his death in 1988.

The house was sold multiple times over the next decades, and underwent many interior modifications. In 2015, it was purchased by owners who restored the house to reflect Ferry's and Kessler's original intent.

== Description ==
The W. Hawkins Ferry House is a Modern two-story, flat-roofed, cubic residence sited on a one-acre lot overlooking Lake St Clair. The main structure is of slender precast concrete columns, set in a grid pattern. The columns are supported with stainless steel posts, with similar caps on the top. The house is topped with a wide steel-framed roof, which overhangs the walls by seven feet. The floors are concrete. The facades are divided into four bays by the columns. The exterior walls are vertical cypress on the street facade and sides, and all glass overlooking the lake. A thin band of glass encircles the house just below the roof, giving the illusion of a floating roof above the house.

The street-side facade has a recessed entry bay rising two stories, and is composed of a tall, rounded arched panel holding the door and two flanking fixed glass panels. First-floor windows in the other bays are casement style, with a fixed glass panel below and a round arched fixed window above. The second-floor windows are similar, but with the round arched window below. Bays on the side of the house are similar. The lake side of the house is full glass, and has two open porches on the second floor with railings.

The interior contains 5600 square feet of space on two levels, laid out in a grid of 15-foot by 15-foot squares defined by the concrete columns. Some of the second floor area vacant, creating room for public spaces on the first floor to rise the full two stories. The first floor contains an entry hall, a stair hall, an office, library, den, living room, dining room, half bath, kitchen and two porches. A spiral staircase connects to the second floor, which contains five bedrooms, three full baths, a sitting room, and two open porches.
