= Charlie Copeland =

Charlie Copeland may refer to:

- Charles L. Copeland, American politician
- Charlie Copeland (footballer), English footballer

== See also ==
- Charles Copeland (disambiguation)
