= Charles Copeland =

Charles Copeland may refer to:

- Charles Copeland Morse (1842–1900), businessman considered the "American Seed King"
- Charles Copeland (illustrator) (1858–1945), American book illustrator
- Charles L. Copeland (born 1963), Delaware businessman and politician
- Charles Townsend Copeland (1860–1952), Massachusetts-based poet and writer
- Charles C. Copeland, American infrastructure engineer

== See also ==
- Charles Copeland Morse House, Morse's home, which is listed on the National Historic Register
