= Woodmere Cemetery =

Cemetery in Wayne County, Michigan, US

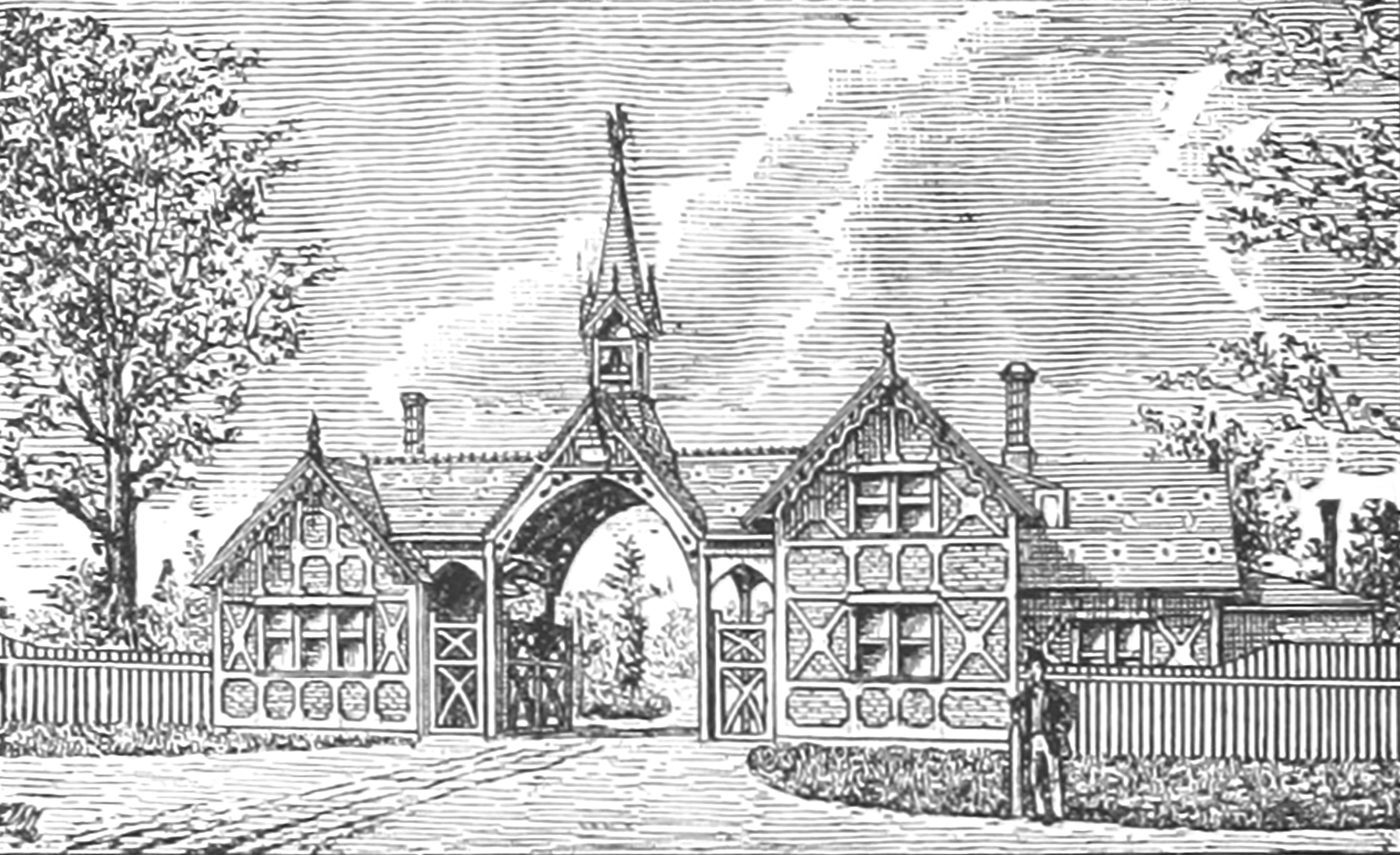
- Entrance to Woodmere Cemetery (1891)
- Interactive map of Woodmere Cemetery

Details
- Established: July 8, 1867
- Location: 9400 W. Fort St., Springwells, Detroit, Michigan
- Country: United States
- Coordinates: 42°18′00″N 83°08′15″W
- Type: Rural cemetery
- Size: 250 acres (100 ha)
- Website: Cemetery website
- Find a Grave: Woodmere Cemetery
- Designer: Adolph Strauch

Woodmere Cemetery is at West Fort Street and Woodmere Avenue in Detroit, Michigan, in the neighborhood of Springwells Village in what was originally the township of Springwells. Woodmere Cemetery is owned and operated by Everstory Partners as of December 2023.

== History ==
The Woodmere Cemetery Association was organized on July 8, 1867, by a group of prominent Detroit businessmen who purchased approximately 250 acres to establish a rural cemetery for the city of Detroit. Woodmere's layout was designed by Adolph Strauch, who also designed Spring Grove Cemetery in Cincinnati, Ohio. Construction began in 1868 and the cemetery was dedicated on July 14, 1869.

The first burials occurred prior to the cemetery's official opening. The first burial was for Anna Maria Schwartz, who was buried in Section C in November 1868. She was soon joined by approximately 2,000 removals from Detroit's City Cemetery that were reburied at Woodmere. In addition to these burials, the city of Detroit also contracted for approximately five acres for the burial of the city's poor. Section C is the cemetery's oldest section and where the large Elks' Rest monument can be found. Once Section C was filled, Woodmere ended its contract with the city to bury the city's poor.

== Notable sections ==
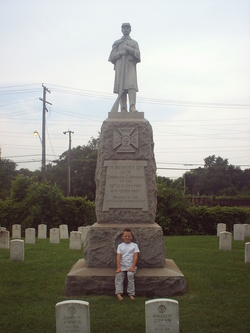
19th U.S. Infantry monument at Woodmere cemetery

The U.S. Army section is at the cemetery's southern end, next to Dearborn Street. The army purchased this section which contains veterans from the Civil War as well as World War II. In 1896 the Civil War soldiers buried at Fort Wayne were moved to Woodmere as the cemetery there had fallen to decay and the records were in shambles. The flagpole in this section divides the Grand Army of the Republic section to the east from the U.S. Army section to the west.

Temple Beth El purchased two sections at Woodmere, Section Beth El and part of the adjacent Section NF. Many of the mausoleums in Section NF were vandalized in December 2012. The bronze doors were removed, leaving the mausoleums open to the elements. These doors were presumably sold for scrap.

The American Moslem Society purchased a section at the northwest corner of the cemetery within view of its mosque on Vernor Highway. This mosque was established in 1937 and is Michigan's oldest.

Victims of the Ford Hunger March killed on March 7, 1932, are buried in the Ferndale section at the cemetery's north end abutting Vernor Highway. The victims are Joseph York, Joseph Bussell, Kalman Leny, and Joseph DeBascio. The United Auto Workers also placed a headstone on an empty space in the same row as the others for Curtis Williams, a marcher who died several months later due to unrelated causes. Williams was cremated at Woodmere, but his ashes were not interred there. A marker is located along the fence outside of the cemetery near these graves.

Three British Commonwealth war graves, of two Canadian Army soldiers of World War I and a Royal Canadian Air Force airman of World War II are buried in the cemetery.

== Notable burials ==
- John J. Bagley (1832–1881), Michigan Governor (1873–1877)
- Charlie Bennett (1854–1927), Major League Baseball player
- David Dunbar Buick (1854–1929), founder Buick Motor Company
- Hamilton Carhartt (1857–1937), founder of Carhartt Inc.
- Nig Clarke (1882–1949), Major League Baseball catcher
- Conrad Ten Eyck (1782–1847), politician, member of the Michigan Senate starting in its inaugural session in 1835, and as a member of the Michigan House of Representatives in 1846
- Dexter M. Ferry (1833–1907), founder of D. M. Ferry & Co.
- Dexter M. Ferry Jr. (1873–1959), politician
- Moses W. Field (1828–1889), member of the United States House of Representatives, instrumental in organizing the Independent Greenback Party
- Levi T. Griffin (1837–1906), politician, member of the United States House of Representatives
- Ignaz Grossmann (1825–1897), Hungarian-born rabbi who ministered in Moravia, Croatia, and America
- Lillian Hollister (1853–1911), temperance and church worker, Supreme Commander of the Ladies of the Maccabees
- Lynn Bogue Hunt (1878–1960), wildlife artist, and illustrator of magazines and books
- Gene Krapp (1887–1923), Major League Baseball pitcher
- Henry M. Leland (1843–1932), founder of Cadillac and Lincoln luxury car brands
- Sophie Lyons (1848–1924), criminal, one of the country's most notorious confidence women
- Frederick Matthaei (1892–1973), founder of Matthaei Botanical Gardens
- Philetus Norris (1821–1885), founder of Norris, Michigan (now Hamtramck) and 2nd superintendent of Yellowstone National Park
- John Pridgeon Jr. (1852–1929), head of a marine transport company and mayor of Detroit
- Charles A. Roxborough (1888–1963), first African-American man elected to the Michigan Senate
- James E. Scripps (1835–1906), founder of The Detroit News
- Ahmad Bakhsh Sindhi (1917–2000), Former Law and Justice Minister in Rajasthan, India
- Eddie Slovik (1920–1945), only World War II U.S. soldier executed for desertion
- David Vartanian (1890–1966), RMS Titanic survivor
- James Vernor (1843–1927), inventor of Vernor's Ginger Ale
- David Whitney (1830–1900), lumber baron
- Grace Whitney-Hoff (1862-1938), philanthropist, founder of the Foyer International des Etudiantes in Paris.
- Joe Yeager (1875–1937), Major League Baseball infielder and pitcher
