= Luz Rodriguez =

Luz Rodriguez may refer to:

- Luz Rodriguez (activist) (born 1956), Puerto Rican activist
- Luz Rodríguez (footballer) (born 1991), Mexican footballer
