= Tracy W. McGregor =

American humanitarian and philanthropist

Tracy William McGregor
- Born: April 18, 1869; Berlin Heights, Ohio, U.S.
- Died: May 6, 1936 (aged 67); Washington, D.C., U.S.

Tracy William McGregor (April 18, 1869 – May 6, 1936) was a humanitarian, philanthropist, and Detroit civic leader. He established the McGregor Fund of Michigan in 1925 with a gift of $5,000, one of Michigan's first charitable foundations. He successfully ran the Mission for Homeless Men (later the McGregor Institute) in Detroit from 1891 until it closed its doors in 1935, first as supervisor and then as a managing trustee. In 1917, he helped organize the Detroit Community Union and Patriotic Fund, forerunners of today's United Community Services. Tracy and his business associates began the Provident Loan and Savings Society, which provided loans at low interest rates. He also helped create the Thursday Noon Group, which met to discuss important community issues like justice in the courts and prisons. McGregor became a trustee and financial supporter of the Merrill-Palmer Institute in Detroit and several universities.

== Personal life ==
Tracy William McGregor was the oldest son of Thomas McGregor (1840–1891) and Elizabeth Taitt (1847–?). His parents had migrated from Oxbow, New York, to Berlin Heights, Ohio, in 1866. Thomas was in the music business, selling pianos, but felt something was missing from his life. In 1887, he abruptly quit the piano business to "serve the Lord." Though his family was shocked as they had no other source of income, Thomas assured them that the Lord would take care of them. In November 1888, he founded the Bethany Mission in downtown Toledo, Ohio. The mission was a success. By 1889, the mission was moved to a new building and opened as the Toledo Helping Hand Mission.

Thomas was so pleased with the success of the Mission that he decided to open a series of missions in other Great Lakes areas. The Mission for Homeless Men opened in Detroit, Michigan, on April 3, 1891. Thomas had contracted a severe respiratory illness from the hard labor under harsh weather conditions during the renovation of the Mission's building, and he missed the opening day ceremonies. He never recovered from that illness and died on April 24, 1891.

Tracy McGregor had been a student at Oberlin College in Oberlin, Ohio, for about two years when he got word of his father's death. He immediately quit school, packed his bags, and headed for Detroit to continue his father's work. Tracy never finished his education. At 22, Tracy abruptly found himself as head of his family; in addition to his mother, his brother Murray (1879) and sister Ruth (1881) were still at home. Elizabeth stayed in Toledo running the Helping Hand Mission, while Tracy concentrated his efforts in Detroit.

McGregor married Katherine Whitney (January 18, 1873 – June 9, 1954), daughter of David Whitney and Flora Ann McLauchlin, on November 20, 1901, in San Francisco, California. The couple had no children. David Whitney, a lumber businessman, was one of the wealthiest men in Michigan and contributed frequently to the Mission for Homeless Men. Tracy and Katherine may have met during one of Tracy's visits to the Whitney mansion on Woodward Avenue in Detroit or when Katherine volunteered at the Children's Free Hospital.

McGregor died suddenly from a heart attack on May 6, 1936, in Washington, D.C. His widow, Katherine, died June 9, 1954, in Beacon, New York. The couple is buried in Woodlawn Cemetery in Detroit.

== Mission for Homeless Men ==
McGregor had worked on and off with his father at the Mission for Homeless Men, so he understood the vision. Even though the Mission was open when he took over, it still required a great deal of renovation and funding. For the next ten years, McGregor worked tirelessly to raise money, improve the building, purchase and build a new building, and improve the reputation of the Mission. One of the hallmarks of the Mission was the religious service he conducted each night. In February 1901, the Mission's governing board hired his brother Murray to tend to financial matters, allowing McGregor to step back a bit to concentrate on other pursuits. After his marriage to Katherine, the Mission was on more solid ground with the availability of the Whitney money and a new endowment.

In 1911, the board of trustees changed the name of the Mission to the McGregor Institute. In 1916, Tracy stepped down as superintendent of the Mission after Murray agreed to take his place at the helm. He remained as a managing trustee of the institute. Throughout the years, the mission provided housing and food for more than 500,000 men. During the 1930s, the U.S. government began programs for the poor; as a consequence, the Institute closed its doors in 1935 and the building was donated to Goodwill Industries.

== Philanthropy ==
Tracy and Katherine McGregor were very generous with their wealth. The couple shared a common concern for those less fortunate than themselves. They were major sponsors of the Associated Charities of Detroit, and, in 1909, they were "donors of major gifts to the Detroit YMCA, Detroit Rescue Mission, Michigan Audubon Society, Grace Reform Mission, Michigan Child Labor Association, Boy Scouts of America, Salvation Army, Society of St. Vincent dePaul, Crittenden House, Thompson Home for Homeless Ladies, Visiting Nurses Association, Protestant Orphan Asylum, and the Women's Board of Home Missions." Much of the McGregors' interest in these organizations was fueled by the plight of the large immigrant population that arrived in Detroit in the early twentieth century. The city was ill-equipped for the influx in terms of housing, city services, and health care.

The McGregors established the benevolent McGregor Fund in 1925 to "relieve the misfortunes and promote the well being of mankind." Tracy was elected president and treasurer of the fund. The McGregors gave major gifts to the fund between 1929 and 1934, totaling about $6 million. Generous grants were (and still are) given to charitable organizations that fit within the interests of the McGregors, including homeless support agencies, education, and mental hygiene programs.

McGregor was on the Committee of Management for the William L. Clements Library at the University of Michigan and worked closely with its curator of manuscripts Howard Henry Peckham. The year before Clements' death. McGregor donated $100,000 to the library and saved a rare collection of historical manuscripts from the Revolutionary War period from being sold and ultimately dispersed to the general private sector.

== Civic leader ==
In addition to running the Mission for Homeless Men for 25 years, McGregor served on boards of trustees and chaired other organizations.

In 1900, Michigan Governor Aaron T. Bliss appointed McGregor to the State Board of Corrections and Charities as the Wayne County agent. This experience introduced him to the problem many Detroiters faced when trying to buy a home or automobile—loans with reasonable interest rates were unavailable. In 1906, Tracy formed the Provident Loan and Savings Society, along with friends J. L. Hudson, James Ingles, and Dexter M. Ferry, Jr. Hudson was the first president and McGregor served as one of the directors for the rest of his life. The Provident Loan and Savings Society was able to provide loans at a 3 to 5 percent interest rate, which caused other lenders to lower their rates.

In 1911, the Detroit Board of Commerce appointed Tracy to a state committee to investigate the Michigan State Prison in Jackson. The investigation highlighted the inhumane "Cell Block," which led to the prison's reform.

In 1912, he invited a number of business and professional leaders to get together to discuss problems in Detroit. This group became the "Thursday Noon Group," which devoted special attention to the "social needs of the rising population, especially in the areas of city planning, sanitary housing, playgrounds for children, industrial education, child labor, and workmen's compensation laws." McGregor chaired the meetings when he was in town. In 1914, the Thursday Noon Group was responsible for encouraging Michigan legislators to create the Michigan Farm Colony for Epileptics at Caro, Michigan (now the Caro Center, a state-operated psychiatric hospital).

In 1913, McGregor was chosen to reorganize the Associated Charities of Detroit; in December 1917, the Detroit Community Union was formed and he was elected as chair of the new organization. He was also part of a financial federation that formed the Detroit Patriotic Fund to coordinate the fundraising campaigns for the war effort during World War I.

In 1913, after her husband Thomas W. Palmer's death, Lizzie Pitts Merrill Palmer set aside $3 million to establish the Merrill-Palmer Motherhood and Home Training School. The school was founded after her death in 1916. McGregor was named to the board of trustees for the Palmer Estate in 1918, and was elected president in 1919. He served as president of the renamed Merrill-Palmer Institute until his death in 1936.

McGregor led a campaign to provide better training and care for "higher-grade feeble-minded children." His efforts were rewarded when voters approved a bond to create the Wayne County Training School in Northville, Michigan. The school opened in 1925 and McGregor was appointed its first president. He served on the administrative board of control for 11 years. The school was closed in 1974.

== The McGregor Plan ==
McGregor was an avid book collector and a great supporter of higher education. When he died in 1936, his personal collection of about 12,500 volumes was donated to the University of Virginia, after an exhaustive search for the appropriate repository. The McGregor Fund also donated $25,000 to the university to create the Tracy W. McGregor Library of American History to house his collection.

In 1932, McGregor developed the "McGregor Plan for the Encouragement of Book Collecting by American College Libraries," which was designed to help smaller colleges and universities outside of New England or away from major universities purchase rare Americana books for their libraries. The Committee on Americana for College Libraries was created by the American Historical Association (AHA) in 1933 to administer the McGregor Plan. In 1934, McGregor was appointed to the committee and was also elected to the board of trustees of the AHA.

The McGregor Fund financed the McGregor Plan. Until his death in 1936, Tracy bought all of the books that were made available to the libraries as part of the Plan. Participating colleges contributed $500 annually and the McGregor Fund matched with an additional $500, so each institution was able to receive $1,000 worth of rare books each year. Considering that the McGregor Plan was in effect from 1934 to 1943, most of which coincided with the Great Depression years, many rare and valuable Americana books were able to be purchased at affordable prices. The McGregor Plan was suspended in 1943 because of World War II and was never reinstated.

Institutions that benefitted from the McGregor Plan include:

♦ Albion College

♦ Baylor University

♦ Carlton College

♦ The College of Wooster

♦ Dartmouth College

♦ Wake Forest University

♦ Wesleyan College
