= William Henry Kessler =

American architect

- Born: December 15, 1924; Reading, Pennsylvania, U.S.
- Died: November 16, 2002 (aged 77); Grosse Pointe Park, Michigan, U.S.
- Education: Chicago Institute of Design; Harvard University
- Occupation: Architect
- Spouse: Margot Walbrecker (m. 1946; died 2002)
- Children: 2, Chevonne Kessler Patten and Tamara Kessler Checkley
- Buildings: William and Margot Kessler House, Michigan Science Center, W. Hawkins Ferry House

William Henry Kessler (December 15, 1924 – November 16, 2002) was an American Modernist Architect.

== Biography ==
=== Early life and education ===
William Kessler was born in 1924 in Reading, Pennsylvania. His father, Fred H. Kessler, established the Lumberman's Merchandising Corporation (LMC) as a cooperative lumber company consortium in the mid-1930s. William Kessler attended the Chicago Institute of Design, graduating with a BA in architecture in 1948. He continued his studies with Walter Gropius at Harvard University.

=== Career, family and later life ===
After graduation, he was recruited by Minoru Yamasaki. and came to Michigan to work at Yamasaki's firm. After working there for some time, Kessler and fellow architect Phil Meathe departed to form their own firm, Meathe, Kessler and Associates. In 1959, Kessler designed the William and Margot Kessler House for himself, his wife Margot, and his family; he constructed it for a total cost of $30,000.

Meathe, Kessler and Associates was dissolved in 1968, and Kessler established his own eponymous firm, while Meathe joined Smith, Hinchman and Grylls, eventually becoming president of the firm. Kessler's firm worked on a variety of single family houses, public housing, college and university buildings, and hospitals. William Kessler died in 2002.
