= Ahmad Bakhsh Sindhi =

Indian politician

- Born: 22 October 1917
- Died: 28 April 2000; Woodmere Cemetery
- Occupations: Advocate, Politician

Ahmad Bakhsh Sindhi (Sindhi: احمد بخش سنڌي; 22 October 1917 – 28 April 2000) was an eminent leader of the Indian National Congress from the state of Rajasthan. He was a very close companion of Pandit Jawaharlal Nehru and Maulana Abul Kalam Azad. He served as the Deputy Speaker in the Rajasthan Legislative Assembly from 1981 till 1982 and the Minister of Law and Justice, Waqf for the Government of Rajasthan from 1983 till 1985.

== Personal life ==
Ahmad Bakhsh Sindhi was born to Haji Mola Bakhsh Sindhi and his wife, Saira Hajjan in Bikaner, Rajasthan to a Sindhi Muslim family. Sindhi was primarily raised and educated by his mother because his father died when he was 8 years old due to choking on a bone.

In 1944, Sindhi achieved the gold medal in his Master of Arts and Bachelor of Laws studies at the prestigious Aligarh Muslim University in the city of Aligarh in Uttar Pradesh, India. From 1944 till 1947, he was a lecturer in philosophy at the Dungar College in Bikaner. He was remarkably proficient in English, Urdu and Hindi languages.

On 6 June 1945, Ahmad Bakhsh Sindhi married Ameena Begum of Bikaner. The couple had five daughters (Late Mrs. Shamim Begum (High School Senior Teacher, Bikaner), Dr. Naseem Sindhi Salim (New York, USA), Mrs Abida Begum (Housewife, New York, USA), Late Ms Aziza Khan, MA LLB (Jodhpur), Ms Chand Sultana (New York, USA), and one son, Mr. Husain Sindhi Ahmad (Engineer, Philadelphia, USA).

== Political career ==
Sindhi’s first political achievement was being appointed to the position of Cabinet Minister for the independent state of Bikaner by its Maharaja, Sir Sadul Singh, in 1948.

Post independence, Sindhi contested in the first two Legislative Assembly elections from Bikaner seat under the banner of Indian National Congress. Pandit Jawaharlal Nehru demonstrated personal interest in his election campaigns and visited Bikaner.

From 1949 till 1980, Sindhi practiced law in the Rajasthan High Court in Jodhpur. He was known for feeding the poor there as well as his overall social work for the lower class in the area. One notable instance was his campaign to help people get housing instead of living on the street by the Sardarpura and Sojati Gate Cemetery.

During a 1971 debate regarding the Indo-Soviet Treaty of Peace, Friendship and Cooperation, Sindhi is cited to have tried to add the amendment to the treaty.

"...If any country invades us [India], we shall depend solely on our own defensive resources and will try to obtain as much aid from other friendly countries as possible"

In 1980, he was elected to the Rajasthan Legislative Assembly (or Vidhan Sabha), representing the city of Jodhpur, India. Soon after, Mr.Sindhi was elected as the Deputy Speaker of the Rajasthan Legislative Assembly to serve till 14 October 1982.

It was in 1983 when he reached the pinnacle of his political career, when he became Law and Justice Minister in Shiv Charan Mathur’s ministry by Indira Gandhi. He retained this position until March 1985.

== Life after politics ==
Sindhi spent the next few years of his life alternating between life in India and in the US to visit his children and grandchildren. By 1994, he eventually settled down in the US, living with his wife and their son.

Sindhi had a cardiac arrest in 2000, and was taken to William Beaumont Hospital in Detroit. He died on 28 April 2000 from complications of his cardiac arrest. At his bedside was his daughter, Naseem Salim. He is buried in Detroit's Woodmere Cemetery.
