= Michigan Science Center =

Science museum in Detroit, Michigan

Coordinates: 42.35844°N 83.062130°W

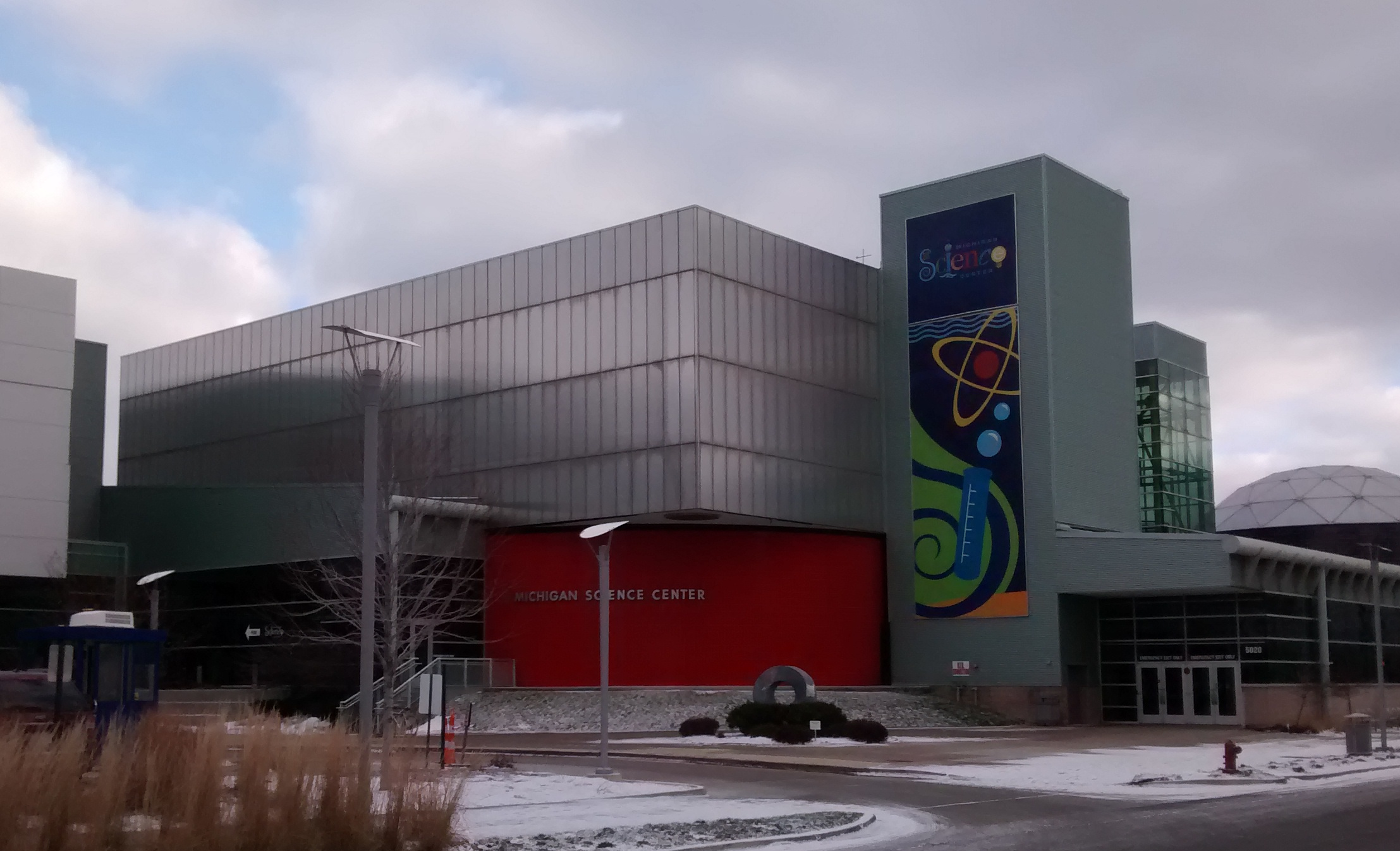
Michigan Science Center

The Michigan Science Center (MiSci) is a Smithsonian-affiliate science museum in Detroit, Michigan. The mission of the Michigan Science Center is to inspire curious minds of all ages to discover, explore and appreciate science, technology, engineering and math (STEM) in a creative, dynamic learning environment. As a 501(c)(3) nonprofit organization, MiSci relies on the generous support of donors, sponsors, community partners and members.

Boasting over 220+ interactive activities, live stage shows, pop-up pocket demonstrations and distance-learning programs, the Michigan Science Center is a community STEM hub serving the entire state through virtual and traveling science programs.

The Michigan Science Center features an IMAX Dome Theatre; the Dassault Systèmes Planetarium; the Toyota Engineering 4D Theater; the DTE Energy Sparks Theater; the Chrysler Science Stage; a 8,700-square-foot (810 m^{2}) Science Hall for traveling exhibits; exhibit galleries focusing on space, life and physical science; the United States Steel Fun Factory; an exhibit gallery just for pint-size scientists; and more.

== History ==
Dexter Ferry is credited for the vision and dedication that led to the creation of the Detroit Science Center; the Detroit-area businessman and philanthropist founded the center in 1970. In 1978, the DSC moved to its Midtown, Detroit, facility designed by Master Architect William Henry Kessler of Detroit-based William Kessler Associates in the midtown cultural center adjacent to the Detroit Institute of Arts and Charles H. Wright Museum of African American History.

The center was closed briefly in the early 1990s after losing funding from the State of Michigan, but re-opened in 1991. The Detroit Science Center operated until 1999 when it closed for construction on a $30 million renovation and expansion - tripling the available exhibit space and adding new theater and performance areas. Neumann/Smith Architecture completed the 67,600 sq ft (6,280 m^{2}). addition and 51,000 sq ft (4,700 m^{2}). renovation. The Detroit Science Center had a grand re-opening celebration in July 2001 and continued to expand, adding a new Digital Dome Planetarium in December 2001 and a 4D Toyota Engineering Theater in 2008.

In partnership with the Thompson Educational Foundation, the Detroit Science Center embarked in April 2008 on another expansion of 80,000 sq ft (7,400 m^{2}). to create a new college-prep charter school named University Prep Science & Math Middle School on its downtown campus. The school facility has classrooms, a gymnasium with locker rooms, food service, and offices, and shares conference space and lobby with the Detroit Science Center. Two Detroit companies completed the new addition, GunnLevine Architects (Architect of Record) and DeMaria Building Company.

On September 26, 2011, the Detroit Science Center closed due to monetary issues. Several planned events, programs, and trips were either postponed or rescheduled to take place at the Detroit Children's Museum. (Ironically, the Detroit Children's Museum itself was closed in December 2011 due to financial difficulties, but reopened in February 2012 solely to Detroit Public School students and lacking Detroit Science Center affiliation.)

On September 7, 2012, local Detroit news reports indicated that a new organization, the Michigan Science Center, would open and operate the facility. A spokesperson stated funding over the past year had been "significant" but did not disclose numbers. A board of directors for the Michigan Science Center first met on September 10, 2012. The Michigan Science Center began operations on December 26, 2012.

== See also ==
- List of science centers
