= William and Margot Kessler House =

Historic house in Michigan, United States

- U.S. National Register of Historic Places
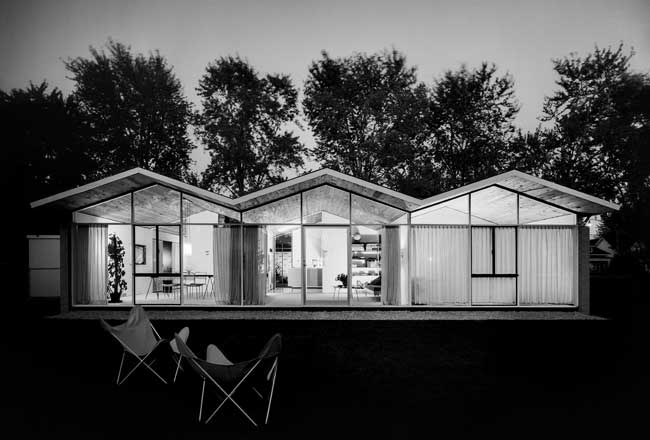

- Location within Michigan Location within the United States
- Interactive map
- Location: 1013 Cadieux Road, Grosse Pointe Park, Michigan
- Coordinates: 42°23′0″N 82°54′55″W
- Area: 120 acres (49 ha)
- Built: 1959
- Architect: William Henry Kessler
- Architectural style: Modern
- NRHP reference No.: 13000801
- Added to NRHP: September 30, 2013

The William and Margot Kessler House is a private house located at 1013 Cadieux Road in Grosse Pointe Park, Michigan. It was listed on the National Register of Historic Places in 2013.

== History ==
William Henry Kessler was born in 1924 in Reading, Pennsylvania. His father, Fred H. Kessler, established the Lumberman's Merchandising Corporation (LMC) as a cooperative lumber company consortium in the mid-1930s; LMC is still in business today with of over two billion dollars a year in sales. William Kessler attended the Chicago Institute of Design, graduating with a BA in architecture in 1948. He continued his studies with Walter Gropius at Harvard University. After graduation, he was recruited by Minoru Yamasaki. and came to Michigan to work at Yamasaki's firm. After working there for some time, Kessler and fellow architect Phil Meathe departed to form their own firm, Meathe, Kessler and Associates. In 1959, Kessler designed this house for himself, his wife Margot, and his family; he constructed it for a total cost of $30,000.

Meathe, Kessler and Associates was dissolved in 1968, and Kessler established his own eponymous firm, while Meathe joined Smith, Hinchman and Grylls, eventually becoming president of the firm. Kessler's firm worked on a variety of single family houses, public housing, college and university buildings, and hospitals. William Kessler died in 2002; his widow Margot remained living in this house until her own death in 2009.

== Description ==
The Kessler House is located on a residential street amid traditional Tudor and Colonial Revival houses, and across the street from Beaumont Hospital. It is a single-story, square plan structure with a light steel frame measuring 39 feet (12 m) by 42 feet (13 m). The most dramatic features of the house are the saw-tooth roof and the textured brick privacy fence that creates an enclosed garden along the front of the house.

The entrance to the house is located under a flat roof between the house and the adjacent storage room/carport. The front and rear elevations of the house are divided into three bays, corresponding to the "teeth" in the roof form, and are entirely glazed from floor to ceiling. The end walls are brick, and contain only the entry door on one side and a single window on the other.

The interior of the house contains 1,700 square feet (160 m^{2}) of living space, including three bedrooms, two bathrooms, a kitchen, a living room, a dining room and a family room. The basement space below remains unfinished. The walls of the main living space are plaster, while the ceiling is covered with cedar planks. The cedar ceiling follows the contour of the roof, and the planks extend beyond the walls to form the exterior soffits.
