= McKenzie Seeds =

Canadian seed company

McKenzie Seeds is a seed packaging company founded in Brandon, Manitoba in 1896. Jiffy has moved production outside of Canada with over 70 people working at their location in Brandon. It was established in 1896 by Dr. Albert Edward McKenzie, and claims to supply 60% of Canada's packet seed market.

Its retail division sells seed under the brands McKenzie, Thompson & Morgan, Gusto Italia, and Pike, as well as other gardening products and accessories. Through a direct mail division it operates the brands McFayden and McConnell catalogues.

== History ==
In 1945, 90% of the company shares passed from its founder to the Manitoba Government to benefit Brandon College, the forerunner to Brandon University. The remaining shares were given to the government in 1975. McKenzie Seeds was run as a Crown Corporation until 1994 at which time it was sold to Regal Greetings and Gifts.

In 2002, the management of McKenzie Seeds bought the company.

In 2008, Jiffy International AS acquired McKenzie, and in 2012, it was acquired by Seed Holdings Inc. but would continue selling products under the "Jiffy" name. The business was merged into Plantation Products, a privately owned gardening company based in Massachusetts. Plantation Products later changed its name to Green Garden Products.

In 2021, Central Garden & Pet acquired Green Garden Products and its brand names Ferry-Morse, American Seed, Livingston Seed, McKenzie, NK Lawn & Garden, Jiffy, SUPERthrive, Dyna-Gro and Seeds of Change.
