= David Dunbar Buick =

Inventor and the founder of Buick Motor Company

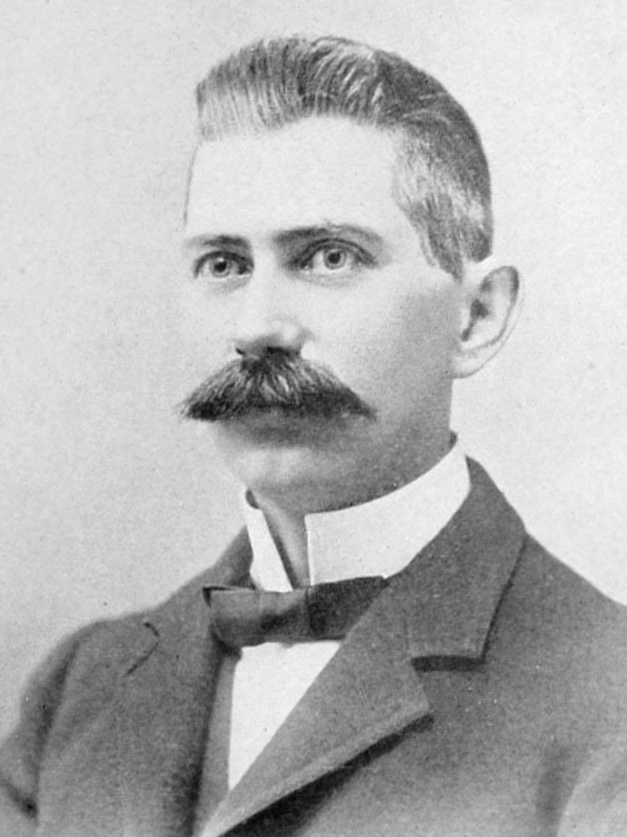
- Buick in 1891
- Born: September 17, 1854; Arbroath, Angus, Scotland
- Died: March 5, 1929 (aged 74); Detroit, Michigan, U.S.
- Burial place: Woodmere Cemetery, Detroit
- Occupations: Inventor, entrepreneur
- Known for: Buick Motor Company

David Dunbar Buick (September 17, 1854 – March 5, 1929) was a Scottish-born American inventor, widely known for founding the Buick Motor Company. He headed this company and its predecessor from 1899–1906, thereby helping to create one of the most successful nameplates in United States motor vehicle history.

== Early life, family and education ==
Buick was born in Arbroath, Scotland to Alexander Buick (a carpenter, d. 1860) and Jane Roger Buick (a butcher's assistant). In 1856, he and his family moved to Detroit, Michigan, when he was two years old. He left school in 1869, to help his widowed mother.

== Career ==
Buick worked for a company that made plumbing goods. When the company ran into trouble in 1882, he and a partner purchased it. At this time, Buick began to show his promise as an inventor, producing many innovations including a lawn sprinkler and a method for permanently coating cast iron with vitreous enamel which allowed the production of "white" bathtubs at lower cost; this method is still in use for enameling cast iron baths, though the market for such tubs has declined. With the combination of Buick's innovation and his partner's sound business management, the company became quite successful.

=== Buick Motor Company ===
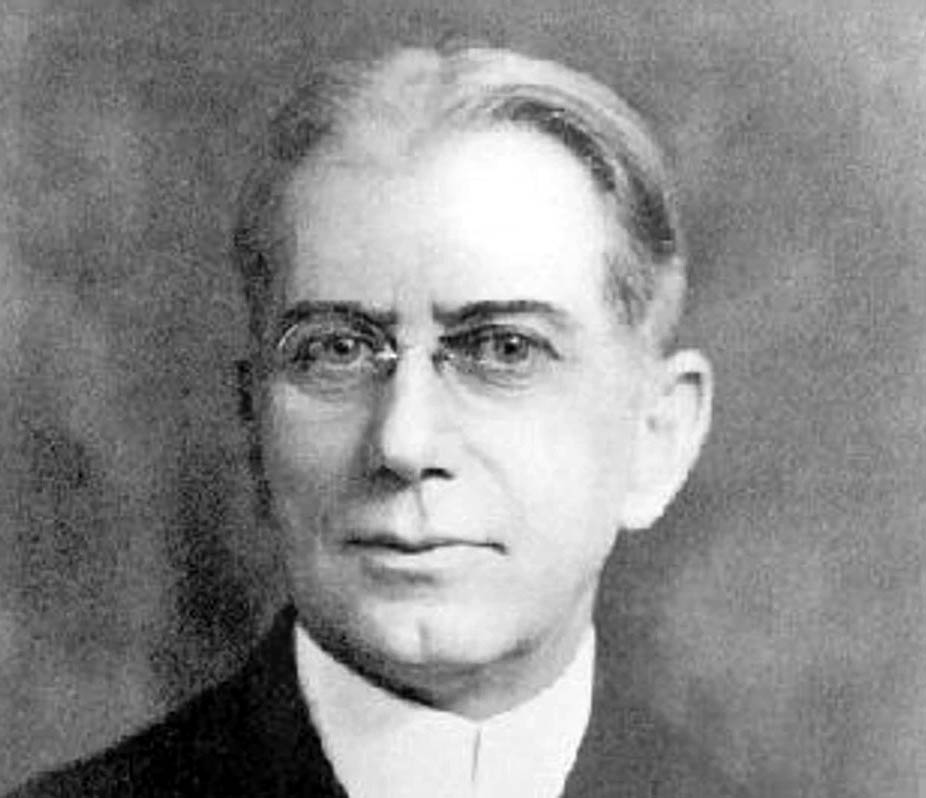
Portrait of Buick in later life

During the 1890s, Buick developed an interest in internal combustion engines and began experimenting with them. He was spending little time on the plumbing business, and his business partner became impatient with him. The partnership was dissolved in 1899, and the company was sold.

Buick now had the time and capital to work on engines full-time, and he set up a new company, the Buick Auto-Vim and Power Company, in 1899. The stated aim of the company was to market engines for agricultural use. Buick soon turned to the development of a complete car, rather than just an engine. He also concentrated on research and development at the expense of manufacturing and sales. The result was that he consumed his capital by early 1902 without having generated any significant return, only producing a single car.

In early 1902, he established the Buick Manufacturing Company, with the objectives of marketing engines to other car companies, and manufacturing and selling its own cars. Manufacturing and development problems ensued, and, at the end of 1902, Buick was out of money with only one car to show for his work. The concentration on development had produced the revolutionary "Valve-in-Head" overhead valve engine. This method of engine construction produces a much more powerful engine than the rival side valve engine design used by all other manufacturers at the time. Overhead valve engines are used by most car manufacturers today, but now only General Motors (GM) and Chrysler produce the "push-rod" variant with any regularity. Since overhead cam engines are design variants of overhead valve engines, all modern engines are derivatives of Buick's invention.

The money ran out again, and in 1903 Buick was forced to raise more money via a $5,000 loan (equivalent to $179,000 in 2025) from a friend and fellow car enthusiast, Benjamin Briscoe. With this financial help, Buick formed the Buick Motor Company, which would eventually become the cornerstone of the General Motors empire.

=== Later life and business failure ===
In 1906, Buick accepted a severance package and left the company that he had founded, with only one share of the company in his possession. Then president of Buick, William C. Durant, bought this share from him for $100,000 (equivalent to $3,600,000 in 2025).

After unsuccessful investments in California oil and Florida land, and an attempt (with his son Tom) to manufacture carburetors, Buick made a brief return to the automotive business in 1921, as president of the short-lived Lorraine Motors, and in 1923 with the design of the Dunbar, an automobile prototype.

In an interview with historian Bruce Catton in 1928, Buick admitted that he was almost completely broke, unable to even afford a telephone, and worked as an instructor at the Detroit School of Trades. He died of colon cancer on March 5, 1929, at the age of 74 and was buried at Woodmere Cemetery in Detroit, Michigan.

Commentator Theodore F. McManus noted that "Fame beckoned to David Buick. He sipped from the cup of greatness, and then spilled what it held." In 2000, automotive historian Vincent Curcio observed that "To date, over 35,000,000 motor cars have been built in his name, which will never be lost to history."

He was posthumously inducted into the Automotive Hall of Fame in 1974.
