= Dexter M. Ferry Jr. =

American politician

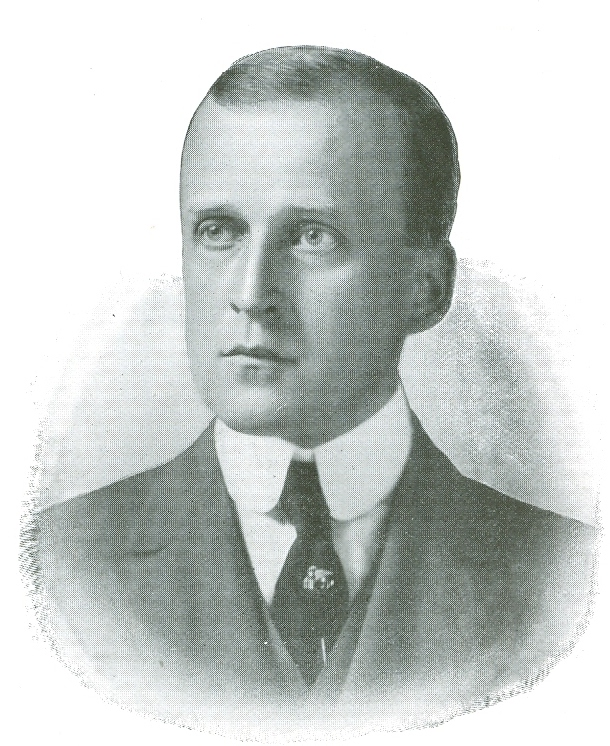
- Ferry c. 1911
- Born: Dexter Mason Ferry Jr. November 22, 1873; Detroit, Michigan, U.S.
- Died: December 7, 1959 (aged 86); Grosse Pointe, Michigan, U.S.
- Education: Columbia University (BA)
- Occupation: Businessman
- Spouse: Jeannette Hawkins (m. 1907)
- Children: 4
- Father: Dexter M. Ferry

Dexter Mason Ferry Jr. (November 22, 1873 – December 7, 1959) was an American politician and businessman from Michigan. He served on the Michigan State House of Representatives and was president of the Michigan State Board of Education. He was also president of D.M. Ferry & Co.

== Early life ==
Dexter M. Ferry Jr. was born on November 22, 1873, in Detroit, Michigan, the son of Dexter M. Ferry and Addie Miller Ferry. He attended school in Lawrenceville, New Jersey, then graduated from high school in Detroit in 1892.

After graduation, he entered the University of Michigan, but a back injury interrupted his studies in his junior year. He continued his studies two years later at Columbia University, graduating in 1898 with a Bachelor of Arts degree.

== Career ==
After completing college, he began working for his father, first as treasurer for the National Pin Company and then, in 1900, at a position at D.M. Ferry & Co. In 1901, he was elected a director of the firm. In 1905, he became a director of the Standard Accident Insurance Company. Ferry was one of the founders of the Provident Loan and Savings Society in 1906, along with Tracy W. McGregor, J. L. Hudson, and James Ingles,

In 1907, on the death of his father, the Ferry was appointed the executor of his estate. Ferry replaced his father as president of D. M. Ferry & Co.

In 1900, Ferry was elected to the Michigan State House of Representatives as a representative from Wayne County, and served for two terms through 1904. He was president of the Michigan State Board of Education from 1906 through 1912.

In 1917, just before the United States joined in World War I, Ferry joined the Army Quartermaster's Reserve Corps as a captain. He was later ordered to active duty at Fort Sam Houston and then to the Motor Convoy Service in Chicago. Ferry was honorably discharged in March 1919 with the rank of lieutenant colonel.

Ferry was president of Standard Accident Insurance Company, vice-president of the Standard Insurance Company, and president of the Michigan Fire & Marine Insurance Co. He was director of the First National Savings Bank of Detroit, the Wayne County Savings Bank, the Security Trust Company of Detroit, and Michigan Savings Bank.

== Personal life ==
Ferry married Jeannette Hawkins on October 1, 1907. The couple had four children: Dexter, Edith, Jean, and William Hawkins. They resided in both Detroit and Grosse Pointe, Michigan.

Ferry a trustee of Grace Hospital. Like his father, Ferry supported the Detroit Institute of Arts, and sat on its board for many years, including serving from 1914 to 1917 as board president. In 1950, Ferry commissioned Marcel Breuer to design a small dormitory, known as Ferry Cooperative House, at Vassar College; the building was opened in 1951.

Ferry died On December 7, 1959, aged 85. He was interred at Woodmere Cemetery, Detroit.
