= Conrad Ten Eyck =

American politician

Member of the Michigan Senate from the 1st district
- In office November 2, 1835 – December 31, 1837
- Preceded by: Legislature established

Member of the Michigan House of Representatives from the Wayne County district
- In office January 5, 1846 – January 3, 1847

Personal details
- Born: August 13, 1782 Albany, New York
- Died: August 23, 1847 (aged 65) Dearborn, Michigan
- Party: Democratic

Conrad "Old Coon" Ten Eyck (August 13, 1782 – August 23, 1847), also known as Conrad TenEyck or Teneyck, was an American politician in the U.S. state of Michigan in the mid-19th century. He served as a member of the Michigan Senate starting in its inaugural session in 1835, and as a member of the Michigan House of Representatives in 1846.

== Early life ==
Conrad Ten Eyck was born on August 13, 1782, in Albany, New York. His parents were Abraham Ten Eyck and Annatje Lansing, and he was the grandson of wealthy Albany businessman Jacob Coenraedt Ten Eyck.

== Career ==
He moved to Detroit in 1802, and for many years operated a store at the corner of Jefferson and Woodward Avenues. At some point, he gained the nickname "Old Coon". In February 1813, following the surrender of Detroit to the British, the British commander, Colonel Henry Procter, ordered Ten Eyck and a number of other prominent citizens to leave the city.

=== Tavern keeper and the "Wolverine State" legend ===
Ten Eyck ran a successful business for many years, the Old Ten Eyck Tavern, in what is now Dearborn, Michigan, at the intersection of modern-day Michigan Avenue and Southfield Road. In this capacity, he gave rise to one legend about the origin of the nickname "Wolverine State" for Michigan.

He enjoyed a joke where he often greeted new guests by yelling to his wife, "Sally, have some more wolf steaks put on!" A story has been told that when he answered an attractive young female visitor's question, "And have I really eaten wolf steak?" in the affirmative, she replied, "Then I suppose I am a wolverine." The assembled male guests, wishing to endear themselves to her, declared they were wolverines, too, and "wolverine" became a nickname adopted by the various pioneers who passed through the tavern; area legend asserts this is the origin of the nickname for the state.

Ten Eyck built the tavern in 1826, and it burned down in 1869, as did its adjoining stables in 1906. Bricks from the tavern were later incorporated into a fireplace in Henry Ford's Fair Lane estate.

=== Political career ===
Ten Eyck served as treasurer of Wayne County from 1817 to 1825, and as the supervisor of Pekin Township—now known as Redford Township—in 1830 and 1831. His house was the site of the meeting to organize Dearborn Township after it was created on March 9, 1833, and was the township supervisor from 1833 through 1837. He also served as a U.S. marshal from 1837 to 1841. He was elected to the Michigan Senate and served in its first two terms, from 1835 through 1837. He later served one term in the Michigan House of Representatives in 1846. He was a Democrat.

Ten Eyck was fervently anti-British, and as sheriff of Wayne County in 1838, he assisted a group of Canadians rebelling against British rule, by loudly announcing in front of rebel sympathizers that there was an unguarded collection of muskets in the basement of the jail, which they promptly raided that evening.

He died on August 23, 1847, in Dearborn, and is buried in Woodmere Cemetery in Detroit.

=== Family ===
Ten Eyck married Sarah Kramer and they had seven children: William, Charles B., Catherine, Mrs. Jane Fisher, Mrs. Maria Sloss, Mrs. Sarah Tompkins, and Mrs. Helen Roberts.

== Sources ==
- Burton, Clarence M.; Stocking, William; Miller, Gordon K. (1922), The City of Detroit, Michigan, 1701-1922, S. J. Clarke
- Corsaro, James (June 2018), A Guide to the Ten Eyck Family Papers: St. Croix (PDF), Albany Institute of History and Art Library
- Farmer, Silas (1890), History of Detroit and Wayne County and Early Michigan: A Chronological Cyclopedia of the Past and Present, Detroit: S. Farmer & Company
- "Legislator Details: Conrad TenEyck", Michigan Legislative Biography, Library of Michigan, 2018
- Michigan Manual (1907–1908 ed.), Lansing: Wynkoop Hallenbeck Crawford, 1907
- "Notables", Woodmere Cemetery Research, 2018, archived from the original on 2016-11-01
- Olson, Sidney (1997), Young Henry Ford: A Picture History of the First Forty Years, Wayne State University Press, ISBN 978-0-8143-1224-7
- Palmer, Friend (1906), Early Days in Detroit, Detroit: Hunt & June
- "The Ten Eyck Tavern", Waymarking.com, March 17, 2008
