= Charles Copeland Morse House =

Historic house in California, United States

- U.S. National Register of Historic Places
- California Historical Landmark
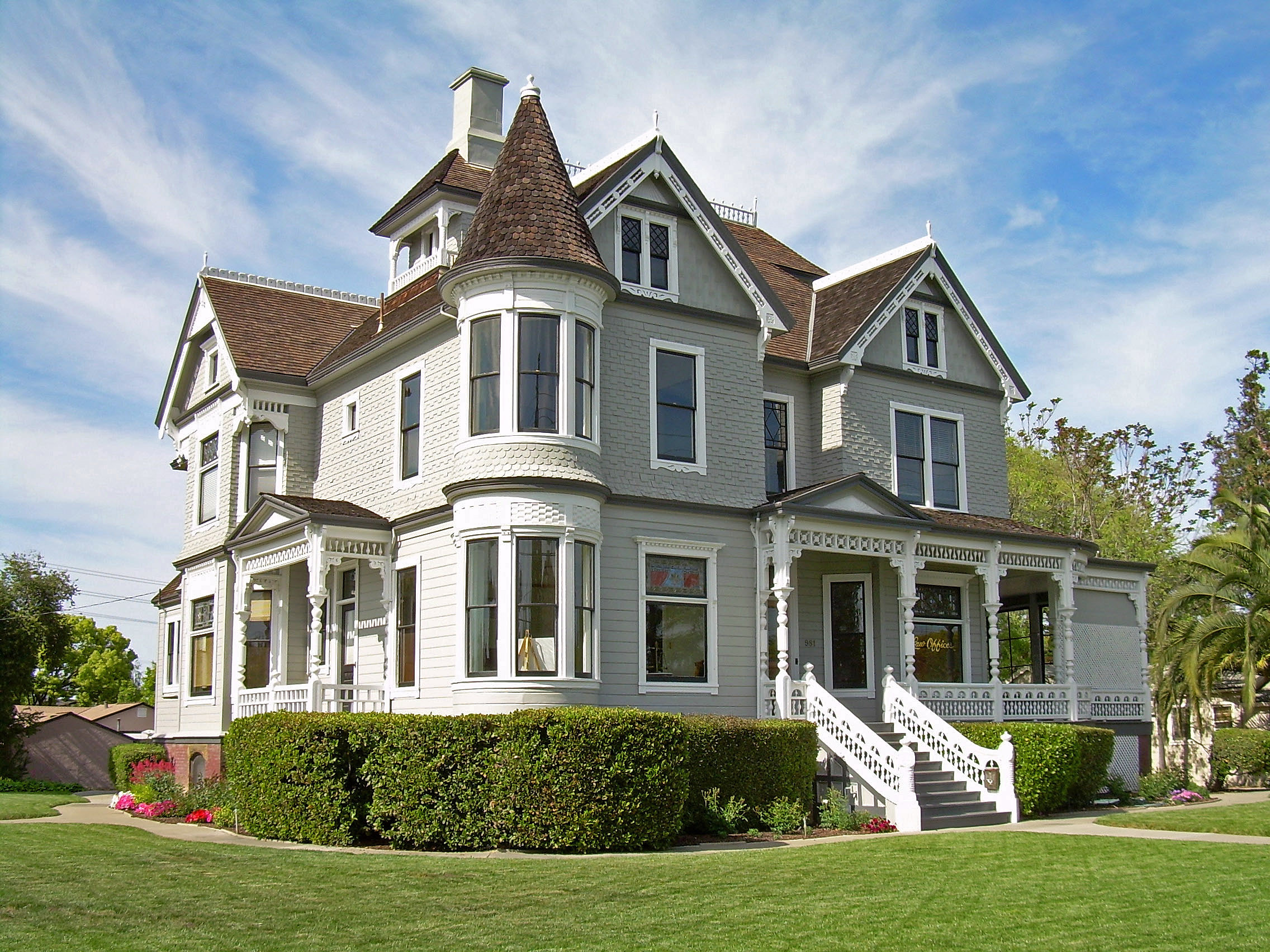
- Location: Santa Clara, California
- Coordinates: 37°21′7.45″N 121°56′43.82″W
- Built: 1892
- Architectural style: Queen Anne—Victorian
- NRHP reference No.: 77000347
- CHISL No.: 904

Significant dates
- Added to NRHP: April 13, 1977
- Designated CHISL: 1976

The Charles Copeland Morse House was the home of Charles Copeland Morse, founder of the Ferry-Morse Seed Company. It is located in Santa Clara, California, and is a California Historical Landmark (#904), as well as listed on the National Register of Historic Places.

This house is a classic Queen Anne Victorian. Rising three stories over a raised basement, the twin gables, witches' hat turret, decorative shingles, trims and stained glass windows all contribute to the grand effect. The entry is distinguished by an ornate front porch. Inside the mansion are rich wood molding, stained glass windows and chandeliers. A unique chandelier is found in the old dining room. This brass fixture came from the family of the founder of the Bank of America, Amadeo Giannini. About 1975, Caroline and Vaughn Nixon bought the house and restored the ornate mansion to its original grandeur.

The Morse Mansion, located at 981 Fremont St., presently houses a sorority of Santa Clara University and is not open to the public.
