= 519 East 11th Street =

Building in Manhattan, New York

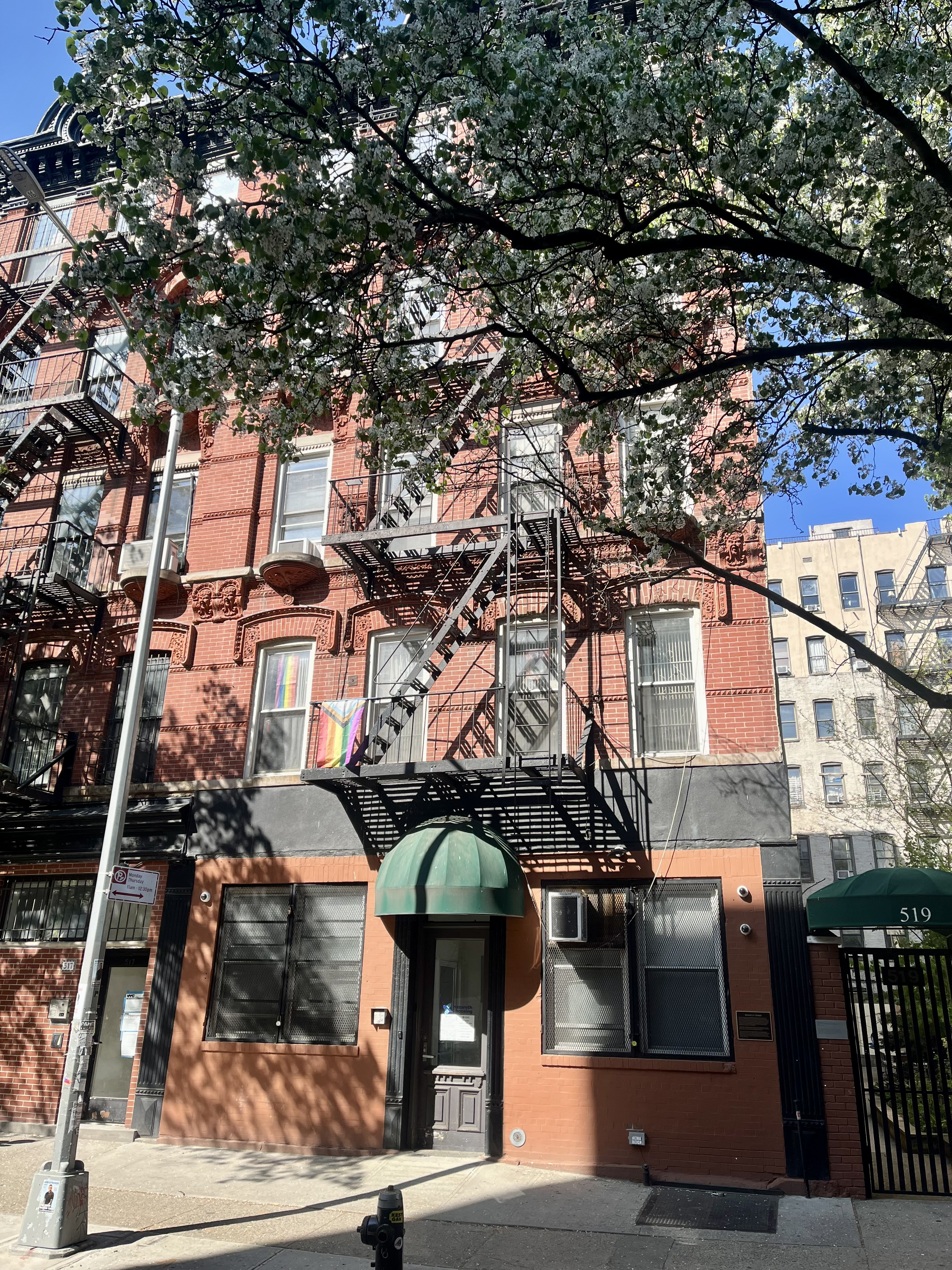
- The building in 2026

General information
- Location: 519 East 11th Street, Manhattan, New York, United States
- Coordinates: 40°43′42″N 73°58′51″W
- Year built: 1888

Design and construction
- Architects: Peter Herter, Francis William Herter
- Developer: Asher Weinstein

519 East 11th Street is a former tenement building in the East Village of Manhattan in New York City. It has some architectural similarities to the Eldridge Street Synagogue in the neighboring Lower East Side. Following abandonment of the building in the 1970s, a group of tenants organized themselves and applied for funding through Federal and municipal programs to take ownership of the building in return repayment of a 30-year loan and for sweat equity work to rehabilitate the building.

== History ==
In 1974, a group purchased 519 East 11th Street from New York City for $100 per unit, under the Division of Alternative Management Program and with assistance from the Urban Homesteading Assistance Board, and received a $177,000 low-interest loan from the city to aid with repairs. Tenants were able to become co-owners of the building by purchasing units at $500 from the group that purchased the building, or by putting in equivalent sweat equity. The building included eleven units in a total of 10,410 square feet (967 m^{2}).

They installed solar panels to assist with heating, in 1976. Charles Copeland was hired by the tenants to oversee the project of installing solar heating.

== Windmill ==
519 East 11th Street became famous for the windmill constructed on its roof, designed to provide power for the building. It had the logo for The 11th Street Movement (El Movimiento de la Calle Once) on its tail blade. This windmill was constructed with the assistance of Windworks, a renewable energy company created with the support of Buckminster Fuller. The $4,000 windmill, which had an output of 2 kilowatts, was placed into operation on November 12, 1976. It was a 1935 Jacobs Wind model that had been previously used to pump water on a farm in the Midwestern United States.

Excess energy, beyond what was consumed by tenants in the building, was pushed back onto Con Edison's grid by causing the meter to run backwards; as a result, the building was sued by Con Edison. Under volunteer representation from Ramsey Clark, the Public Service Commissioner ruled in favor of the tenants. This ruling played a key role in the creation of the Public Utility Regulatory Policies Act (PURPA) in 1978. Ed Koch, and Robert and Lola Redford, visited the building to see the famed windmill. The MacNeil/Lehrer Report filmed an episode of its show on the roof of the building, to showcase the windmill.

The windmill was credited with powering the building through the 1977 blackout, even while the surrounding neighborhood lost power. The windmill only functioned for a few years, because it was difficult to maintain.

== See also ==
- Urban Homesteading Assistance Board
