= Charlie Copeland (footballer) =

English footballer

Personal information
- Full name: Charles William Copeland
- Date of birth: 12 March 1892
- Place of birth: Grangetown, North Yorkshire, England
- Date of death: 1939 (aged 46–47)
- Height: 5 ft 8 1/2 in (1.74 m)
- Position: Defender

Senior career*
Years	Team	Apps	(Gls)
1911–1912	South Bank		
1912–1919	Leeds City	44	(0)
1919–1920	Coventry City	32	(0)
1920	Merthyr Town	8	(0)
Total		84	(0)
- * Club domestic league appearances and goals

Charles William Copeland (12 March 1892 – 1939) was an English footballer who played in the Football League for Coventry City, Leeds City and Merthyr Town. In 1919 Copeland reported Leeds City to the FA for making illegal payments to guest players during World War I which led to the club being expelled by the Football League.
