= Dexter M. Ferry =

American businessman (1833–1907)

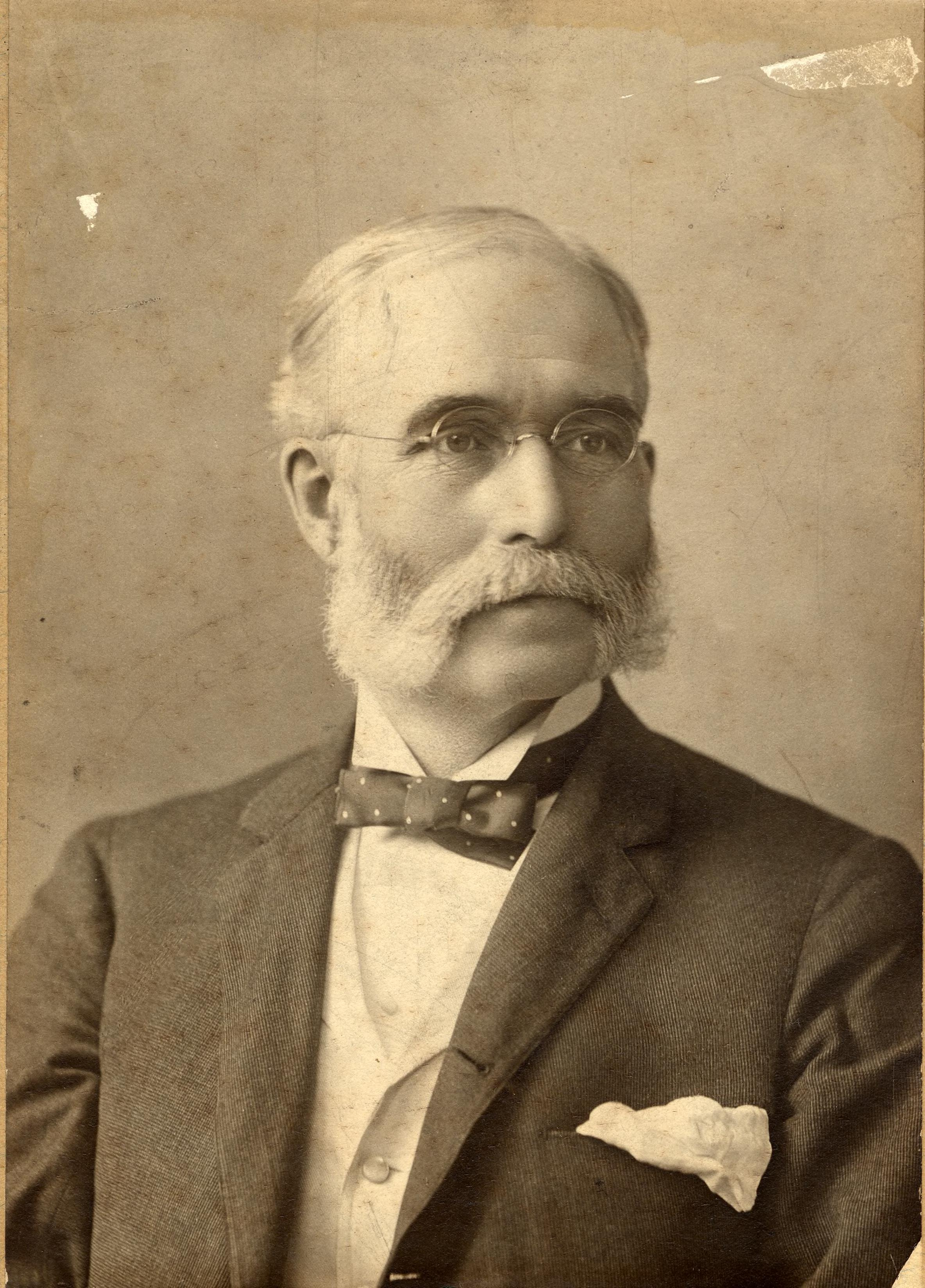
- Born: Dexter Mason Ferry; August 3, 1833; Lowville, New York, U.S.
- Died: November 10, 1907 (aged 74); Detroit, Michigan, U.S.
- Occupation: Businessman
- Known for: Founding D.M. Ferry & Co.
- Spouse: Addie E. Miller (m. 1867)
- Children: 3, including Dexter M. Ferry Jr.

Dexter Mason Ferry (August 8, 1833 – November 10, 1907) was an American businessman from who founded D.M. Ferry & Co. in Detroit, at one time the largest seed company in the world. He was the namesake of Ferry Field at the University of Michigan in Ann Arbor.

== Early life ==
Dexter M. Ferry was born in Lowville, New York on August 8, 1833, the son of wagonmaker Joseph N. and Lucy Mason Ferry. When Dexter was three, his father died, and his mother moved to Penfield, New York, where Dexter spent his school years. When he was 16, Dexter Ferry began working on a farm, earning $10 per month, and attending school in the winter. In 1851, he began working for Ezra M. Parsons of Rochester, New York, and entered school there. A few months later, Parsons secured a position as an errand boy for Ferry at the S.D. Elwood & Company of Detroit, a stationery firm, and in 1852 Ferry moved to Detroit. He was soon promoted to salesman at the firm, and later bookkeeper.

== D.M. Ferry & Co. ==
In 1856, Ferry got into the seed-growing business as a junior partner, along with Milo T. Gardner and Eber F. Church, of M.T. Gardner & Company (also known as Gardner, Ferry, and Church). The first year, the company did $6000 in business and it continued to be stable, but unremarkable, until 1865, when Ferry bought out Gardner's share and took over the company. Ferry changed the company name to Ferry, Church & Co, and two years later, when Church retired, changed the name again, this time to D.M. Ferry & Co.

Ferry introduced several innovations in the seed-vending business. He sold only fresh seed, increasing germination rates and establishing a reputation for quality. Ferry was among the first to sell seeds in small packets.

The business grew steadily, and in 1879 was incorporated under the name D.M. Ferry & Co with $750,000 in capital, with Ferry as president, James McMillan as vice-president, H. Kirke White as secretary, and Charles C. Bowen as treasurer. A. E. F. White, John Stoughton Newberry, and W. K. Anderson were also officers. At the same time, the Detroit Seed Company was absorbed into the new corporation. Business of the company continually increased for some time, until January 1, 1886, when a disastrous fire demolished the company's warehouse with the loss of near $1,000,000. However, Ferry quickly organized the company, bought seeds from outside sources and absorbed two smaller seed companies, and the company managed to fill orders for its customers.

Ferry built a new warehouse, and by 1890 was doing over a million and a half dollars in business annually. By the early 1900s, the company was doing over $2,000,000 per year in business, and supplying seeds to 160,000 retail outlets.

== Personal life ==
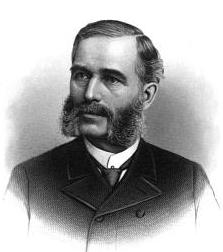
Dexter M Ferry, around 1890

On October 1, 1867, Ferry married Addie E. Miller. The couple had three children who outlived them: Dexter M. Ferry, Jr., Blanche Ferry Hooker, and Queene Ferry Coonley.

== Other pursuits ==
Dexter M. Ferry was also president of the First National Bank of Detroit, the Union Trust Company, Standard Accident Insurance Company, Michigan Fire & Marine Insurance Company, the American Harrow Company, and the National Pin Company, and one of the organizers of the Wayne County Savings Bank. He also owned substantial real estate, much of it used by his seed company. He helped manage Detroit's Harper Hospital for nearly forty years, and was one of the founders of Grace Hospital.

He was a trustee of Olivet College and of the First Congregational Church of Detroit, and was a founding subscriber to the predecessor to the Detroit Institute of Arts, the Detroit Museum of Art in 1884.

Ferry was also active in public service and Republican politics. He served one term on the Detroit Board of Estimates in 1877-78, and on the Detroit Board of Park Commissioners in 1884. In 1892 and 1904 he was a delegate from Michigan to the Republican National Convention. He was Chair of the Republican State Central Committee in 1896-98, and a candidate for nomination for governor in 1900.

== Death ==
Addie Ferry died on November 2, 1906. Dexter closely followed his wife, dying at his home in Detroit on November 10, 1907. He was buried at Woodmere Cemetery in Detroit, Michigan.

Party political offices
| Preceded by James McMillan | Chairman of the Michigan Republican Party; 1896 – 1898 | Succeeded by Arthur M. Marsh |
