= Charles C. Copeland =

American infrastructure engineer

Charles C. Copeland is an American infrastructure engineer who has helped preserve and maintain several well-known New York City buildings and has developed innovative energy-conservation initiatives. Among the more iconic buildings are the Empire State Building, Grand Central Terminal, and the Alexander Hamilton Customs House. The energy-conserving innovations include an early (1974) solar energy rooftop installation in Manhattan and a 2015 patent for a control sequence to reduce peak utility steam demand in Manhattan buildings. He is president and CEO of Goldman Copeland Consulting Engineers, which also works with many of the nation's largest commercial property owners.

== Early life and education ==
Charles Copeland was born in New York and raised in Westchester County, graduating from Ardsley High School. He earned a bachelor's degree in mechanical engineering at Missouri University of Science and Technology and a master's degree in mechanical engineering at City College of New York. He is a licensed professional engineer.

== Career ==
In 1970, Charles Copeland joined consulting engineering firm Goldman & Sokolow, founded in 1968, which became Goldman Copeland in 1991. He has overseen the firm's work on such New York City landmarks as Carnegie Hall, Columbia University, the Empire State Building, Grand Central Terminal, the Guggenheim Museum, National Museum of the American Indian, and New York University.

He began addressing energy needs in 1974, designing an early, influential solar collector thermal installation for a homesteading group resurrecting 519 East 11th Street, an abandoned building in Manhattan's East Village. A windmill on the roof occasionally created an excess of electric power, which led to a dispute with Con Edison, which at that time prohibited any connection to their electrical grid. The dispute rose to the New York State Public Service Commission, where the homesteaders – represented pro bono by former US Attorney General Ramsey Clark – prevailed. The ruling was a crucial forerunner of federal enactment in 1978 of the Public Utility Regulatory Policies Act, which was key to enabling safe connections to the electrical grid. In 1988 Copeland was responsible for managing engineering work under the New York City Energy Conservation Capital Program, which was the largest municipal energy conservation program of its kind in the United States.

== Awards ==
Charles Copeland has received numerous awards and recognition. In 2018, he oversaw the preparation of a geothermal screening tool for every lot in New York City, which was honored with a Platinum Award by the Association of Consulting Engineers Council. Also in 2018, the New York Energy Consumers Council presented him with its leadership and innovation award for his legacy of creative energy solutions. In 2015, he was awarded a patent for a control sequence to reduce peak utility steam demand in New York City buildings by storing thermal energy in building hydronic systems. He was named Energy Engineer of the Year in 2006 by the Association of Energy Engineers, and was named a Fellow of the American Society of Heating, Refrigerating and Air Conditioning Engineers in 1991. In 2019, Copeland was named the ENR New York's Legacy Award winner for 2019. In 2020 Copeland was named a recipient of the CCNY Townsend Harris Award as well as the ASHRAE Louise and Bill Holladay Distinguished Fellow Award.

== Articles ==
Bylined articles by Charles Copeland have been published by leading industry publications, addressing major engineering challenges and opportunities such as "Mapping Geothermal Potential in NYC," "Lessons in Fire Protection from Notre-Dame," "Improving the Performance of Steam Turbine Chiller Plants," and "Developing Geothermal Screening Web Tools." Engineering News-Record published a profile in 2020 of Copeland titled "Sustainability is Engineer Charlie Copeland's Passion." Crain's New York Business published a profile titled "The Man Who Air-conditioned Grand Central Terminal Worries About Climate Change."
