= Charles Copeland Morse =

American businessman (1842–1900)

Charles Copeland Morse (1842–1900) was an American businessman known as the "American Seed King". He co-founded the Ferry-Morse Seed Company, which became the world's leading flower and vegetable seed producer.

== Biography ==
Born in Thomaston, Maine, Morse came to California originally in 1859, lured by the California Gold Rush. After mining for a couple of years, he found his way to Santa Clara in 1862. Santa Clara was then a small town with an agricultural setting. Morse engaged in several occupations, among them that of a house painter.

Charles Copeland Morse married Maria Josephine Victoria Langford in 1868. In 1877, he and A.L. Kellogg, a Methodist minister, pooled their money to buy a seed-growing enterprise, which became the leading seed producer on the West Coast. In 1930, the C.C. Morse and Co. merged with D.M. Ferry Co., another seed-producing business, and became the Ferry-Morse Seed Co.

In addition to being active in his business, he was one of the founders of the Bank of Santa Clara and the Advent Christian Church of Santa Clara. Charles and Maria had five children who grew up in the mansion that a local newspaper dubbed "the house that seed built."

The Charles Copeland Morse House is listed on the National Register of Historic Places.
