= Ferry-Morse Seed Company =

Supplier of seeds

- Industry: Agricultural
- Predecessor: D.M. Ferry & Co; Ferry, Church & Co; Gardner, Ferry, and Church; M.T. Gardner & Company
- Founded: 1856; 170 years ago in Detroit, Michigan in the United States
- Founder: Dexter M. Ferry; Eber F. Church; Milo T. Gardner
- Parent: Jiffy International
- Website: ferrymorse.com

The Ferry-Morse Seed Company is a supplier of seeds, and was at one time the largest such company in the world. It is currently part of Green Garden Products, a privately owned gardening company based in Massachusetts.

== D.M. Ferry & Co. ==
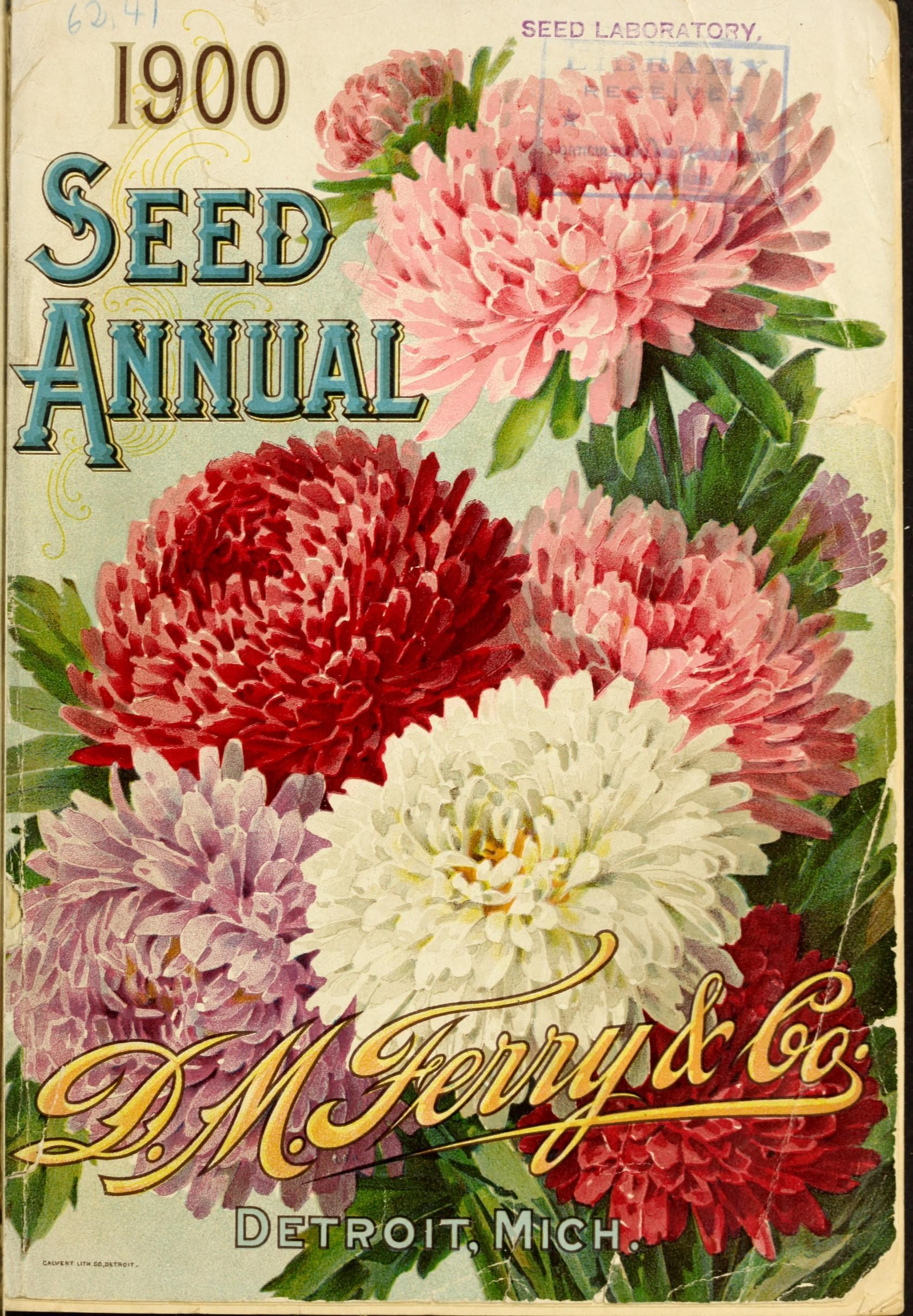
Ferry seed catalog for 1900

In 1856, Milo T. Gardner, Dexter M. Ferry, and Eber F. Church organized a small seed-growing company, M.T. Gardner & Company (also known as Gardner, Ferry, and Church) in Detroit, Michigan. The first year the company did $6,000 in business. Its profits continued to be stable until 1865, when Ferry bought out Gardner's share and took over the company. Ferry changed the company name to Ferry, Church & Co, and two years later, when Church retired, Ferry changed the name again, this time to D.M. Ferry & Co.

The business grew steadily and, in 1879, was incorporated under the name D.M. Ferry & Co with $750,000 in capital, and Ferry as president, James McMillan as vice-president, H. Kirke White as secretary, and Charles C. Bowen as treasurer. A. E. F. White, John Stoughton Newberry, and W. K. Anderson were also officers. At the same time, the Detroit Seed Company was absorbed into the new corporation. Business of the company continually increased for some time, until January 1, 1886, when a disastrous fire demolished the company's warehouse with the loss of near $1,000,000. However, Ferry quickly re-organized the company, bought seeds from outside sources and absorbed two smaller seed companies, and the company managed to fill orders for its customers.

== Growth and operations outside Detroit ==
By the early 1900s, the company was doing over $2,000,000 per year in business, and supplying seeds to 160,000 retail outlets. Ferry built a new warehouse, and by 1890 was doing over a million and a half dollars in business annually.

Ferry began to operate facilities outside Detroit. Operations in Charlevoix, Michigan began when the train lines extended up to that area in 1892, and a large Charlevoix warehouse facility was built in 1905 along the lake near the new Chicago and West Michigan Railway line. A 200' pier ran out into Lake Charlevoix. Seeds were accumulated from local farms, brought to this warehouse by horse-drawn wagons, then bagged and shipped by rail or freight to Detroit. Charlevoix operations continued until 1927.

In 1905, Ferry sold one of their large corn fields to the Burroughs Adding Machine Company. That property is bordered by Second and Third Avenues on the east and west and by Burroughs and Amsterdam Avenues on the north and south, the city's northern limit at that time.

== C.C. Morse & Co. ==
Meanwhile, in 1874, R. W. Wilson began a seed-producing company based in Santa Clara, California. However, Wilson's health was poor, and in 1877 he sold the operation to Charles Copeland Morse and A. L. Kellogg. Morse built the company up, and in 1884 bought out Kellogg and incorporated as C.C. Morse & Co. Charles Copeland Morse died abruptly in 1900, and his son Lester Morse took over the business. The 1906 earthquake demolished the firm's facilities, but they quickly moved to temporary space in San Francisco, and the company bought out Cox Seed and Plant.

== Mergers and acquisitions ==
In the early 1900s, D.M. Ferry bought land in California to grow crops for seed. In 1921, they bought the commission packet business from Morse. By 1930, Ferry was growing most of its seed in California, and the two firms had complementary businesses. A merger made sense for both companies, and in 1930 they combined to form the Ferry-Morse Company. The combined firm became the largest seed distribution company in the world. In 1959, the headquarters of the business moved to western Kentucky.

In 1981, Ferry-Morse became part of France's Groupe Limagrain, the largest seed producer in the world.

In 2005, Groupe Limagrain sold Ferry-Morse to Jiffy International.

In 2012, Seed Holdings acquired Ferry-Morse from Jiffy. The business was merged into Plantation Products, a privately owned gardening company based in Massachusetts. Plantation Products later changed its name to Green Garden Products.

In 2021, Central Garden & Pet acquired Green Garden Products and its brand names Ferry-Morse, American Seed, Livingston Seed, McKenzie, NK Lawn & Garden, Jiffy, SUPERthrive, Dyna-Gro and Seeds of Change.
